= Kiss Me =

Kiss Me may refer to:

== Film ==
- Kiss Me (1929 film), a French silent comedy film
- Kiss Me (1932 film), a French comedy film
- Kiss Me (2011 film) or With Every Heartbeat, a Swedish drama film
- Kiss Me (2014 film), an American romantic drama film

== Music ==
=== Albums ===
- Kiss Me (album), Japanese title for Mambo No. Sex, by E-Rotic, 1999, or the title song
- Kiss Me, Kiss Me, Kiss Me, by the Cure, 1987

=== Songs ===
- "Kiss Me" (Ariana Grande song), 2026
- "Kiss Me" (C. Jérôme song), 1972
- "Kiss Me" (Empress Of song), 2023
- "Kiss Me" (Indecent Obsession song), 1992
- "Kiss Me" (Olly Murs song), 2015
- "Kiss Me" (Sixpence None the Richer song), 1998
- "Kiss Me" (Tin Tin song), 1982, later recorded solo by Stephen Duffy
- "Kiss Me", by Cassie from Cassie, 2006
- "Kiss Me", by the Del-Vikings, 1968
- "Kiss Me", by Dermot Kennedy, 2022
- "Kiss Me", by EC2, 1990
- "Kiss Me", by Ed Sheeran from +, 2011
- "Kiss Me", by George Maharis, 1963
- "Kiss Me", by Johnny Burnette, 1958
- "Kiss Me", by Marvin & Johnny
- "Kiss Me", by Sabrina Salerno from Sabrina, 1987
- "Kiss Me", written by Noël Coward from the operetta Bitter Sweet

== Other uses ==
- Kiss Me, a brand of Isehan Cosmetics, launched in 1935

== See also ==
- Kiss (disambiguation)
- Kiss Me, Kill Me (disambiguation)
- Kiss Me Kiss Me (disambiguation)
- Kiss me a lot (disambiguation)
- Kiss You (disambiguation)
- Bésame (disambiguation) (Spanish: Kiss Me)
