= The Kiss =

The Kiss may refer to:

== Art ==
- The Kiss (Brâncuși sculpture), a 1908 sculpture by Constantin Brâncuși
- The Kiss (Hayez), an 1859 painting by Francesco Hayez
- The Kiss (Klimt), a 1907 painting by Gustav Klimt
- The Kiss (Munch), an 1897 oil painting by Edvard Munch
- The Kiss (Ralli), an 1887 oil painting by Théodore Ralli
- The Kiss (Rodin sculpture), an 1889 sculpture by Auguste Rodin
- V-J Day in Times Square, a 1945 photograph by Alfred Eisenstaedt
- The Kiss, or Le Baiser de l'hôtel de ville, a photograph by Robert Doisneau
- The Kiss, a statue by Sophie Ryder

== Film and television ==
- The Kiss (1896 film), an 18-second film reenactment of the last scene of the stage musical The Widow Jones
- The Kiss (1914 film), a silent film directed by Ulysses Davis
- The Kiss (1921 film), a silent film directed by Jack Conway, starring Carmel Myers
- The Kiss (1929 film), a silent film directed by Jacques Feyder, starring Greta Garbo
- The Kiss (1958 film), a short film nominated for an Academy Award
- The Kiss (1983 film), a film directed by Roman Balayan
- The Kiss (1988 film), a horror film directed by Pen Densham
- The Kiss (1992 film), a film with a score by Nathan Wang
- The Kiss (1995 film), a pornographic film starring Jenna Jameson
- The Kiss (2003 film), a comedy-drama directed by Gorman Bechard
- The Kiss (2004 film) (Dutch: De kus), a Belgian film directed by Hilde Van Mieghem
- The Kiss (2007 film), a Japanese crime film
- The Kiss (2022 film), a Danish film directed by Bille August
- "The Kiss" (Ally McBeal), a 1997 television episode
- "The Kiss" (The Amazing World of Gumball), a 2011 television episode
- "The Kiss" (Dawson's Creek), a 1998 television episode
- "The Kiss" (Even Stevens), a 2002 television episode
- "The Kiss" (Grimm), a 2012 television episode
- "The Kiss" (Modern Family), a 2010 television series episode

== Literature ==
- The Kiss (novel), a novel by Danielle Steel
- The Kiss (memoir), a memoir by Kathryn Harrison
- "The Kiss", a short story by Anton Chekhov
- "The Kiss", a short story by Kate Chopin

== Music ==
- The Kiss (opera), an 1876 work by Bedřich Smetana
- The Kiss (Arditi and Aldighieri), an 1860 song by Luigi Arditi and Gottardo Aldighieri

=== Albums ===
- The Kiss (album), an album by Trin-i-tee 5:7
- The Kiss and Other Movements, an album by Michael Nyman, with a title track based on a painting of the same name by Paul Richards
- The Kiss, an album by Bikeride

=== Songs ===
- "The Kiss", a song by Caroline Rose from The Art of Forgetting
- "The Kiss", a song by The Cure from Kiss Me, Kiss Me, Kiss Me
- "The Kiss", a song by Dweezil Zappa from Confessions
- "The Kiss", a song by Hooverphonic from Hooverphonic Presents Jackie Cane
- "The Kiss", a song by Judee Sill from Heart Food
- "The Kiss", a song by Queen from the Flash Gordon soundtrack album
- "The Kiss", a song by The Sea and Cake from The Biz
- "The Kiss", a song by Patrick Wolf from The Magic Position
- "The Kiss", an instrumental by Trevor Jones & Randy Edelman The Last of the Mohicans soundtrack album

== See also ==
- Kiss (disambiguation)
- Il bacio
