= Kisin =

Kisin (Cyrillic: Кисин) may refer to

- Cizin, a Maya god of death and earthquakes
- Kisin (surname)

== See also ==
- Kissin (disambiguation)
