= Bésame =

Bésame (Spanish: Kiss Me) may refer to:

- "Bésame Mucho", Spanish-language song written in 1940 by Mexican singer Consuelo Velázquez
- Besame Mucho El Musical, jukebox musical featuring bolero songs from the 1920s and 1930s
- "Bésame" (Alejandro Sanz and Shakira song), 2025
- "Bésame" (Camila song), 2010
- "Bésame" (Gian Marco song), 2018
- "Bésame", 2001 song by Ricardo Montaner
- "Bésame", 2010 song by Jay Del Alma featuring Münchener Freiheit (band)

== See also ==
- "Bésame sin miedo", song recorded by the Mexican group RBD for their third Spanish studio album Celestial
- Bésame Tonto, 2003 Spanish-language television soap opera that was produced jointly by Peruvian and Venezuelan producers
- Bésame Mucho (disambiguation)
- Kiss Me (disambiguation) (Spanish: Bésame
