= Yuki Ogoe =

Japanese actor and model (born 1994)

- 小越 勇輝
- Born: April 8, 1994 (age 32); Tokyo, Japan
- Other name: Ogotan
- Occupation: Actor
- Years active: 2000-present
- Agent(s): TACHI PRO, INC.
- Known for: Tenimyu as Ryoma Echizen
- Website: tachipro.jp/ogoe.html

Yuki Ogoe (小越 勇輝, Ogoe Yūki; born April 8, 1994, in Tokyo) is a Japanese actor who is represented by AT Production. He played the role of Ramon (Basshaa) in the 2008 Kamen Rider TV series Kamen Rider Kiva.

== Biography ==
In 2007, Ogoe became a guest star in episodes 5 and 6 of Kamen Rider Den-O. The following year, he portrayed Basshaa's human form, Ramon in Kamen Rider Kiva. In 2010, he got the role of Ryoma Echizen's sixth musical actor in Tenimyu. He is the first and only Ryoma Echizen of the second season of Tenimyu and part of the sixth-generation and seventh-generation Seigaku cast. In April 2015, along with fellow Tenimyu actors, Dori Sakurada, Hisanori Sato, and Airu Shiozaki, he starred in Rock Opera: Psychedelic Pain. In March 2015, Ogoe confirmed on his blog that he would be portraying Ken Kaneki of the popular manga series Tokyo Ghoul created by Sui Ishida for a stage play with his fellow Kiva and Tenimyu actors, Mitsu Murata and Yuki Kimisawa. In August 2015, he was revealed to be the new portrayer of Sakamichi Onoda for the new Yowamushi Pedal stage play Yowamushi Pedal Irregular.

During his time in Tenimyu, he earned the title "The Prince of Tenimyu" because he performed 518 performances in a row without ever missing one. He currently has the record for the most performances performed in Tenimyu.

Ogoe later announced that he will be giving up his role as Ken Kaneki in the July 2017 run of Tokyo Ghoul stage play during Jump Festa 2017.

Ogoe will be starring as Nobita Nobi in the re-run of Doraemon: Nobita and the Animal stage play that was first performed in 2009.

In July 2021, his agency announced that Ogoe injured his right clavicle while shooting NHK Premium Drama Living Again. As per his request, Ogoe will still continue performing for Umebo 12th WONDER "Odonro".

== Filmography ==
=== TV series ===
Year	Title	Role	Notes	Ref.
2007	Kamen Rider Den-O	Daiki Saito	Episodes 5-6	
2008–09	Kamen Rider Kiva	Ramon		
2016–17	Yowamushi Pedal	Sakamichi Onoda	Lead role; 2 seasons	
2018	Dolmen X	Nii		
2018	I"s	Jun Koshinae		
2018	Survival Wedding	Ryota Takahashi		
2019	Fujoshi, Ukkari Gay ni Kokuru	Ryōhei Takaoka		
2019	Coffee & Vanilla	Tsubasa Yoshiki		
2020	Mewkledreamy	Haruto Sugiyama	Voice in anime	
2022	Hairpin Double	Kensuke Hayami	Voice in anime	
2024	I Became the Main Role of a BL Drama	Hiroomi Yukari		
2025	Reiwa Suspense Theatre: Traveler Coroner Shusaku Dojo	Ryosuke Sakuma		

=== Films ===
Year	Title	Role	Notes	Ref.
2008	Departures	Young Boy		
2008	Kamen Rider Kiva: King of the Castle in the Demon World	Ramon		
2009	Cho Kamen Rider Den-O & Decade NEO Generations: The Onigashima Battleship	Ramon		
2010	Alien vs Ninja	Nishii		
2012–13	Tenimyu Film Festival	Ryoma Echizen		
2018	Dolmen X	Nii		
2020	The Werewolf Game: Death Game's Operator		Lead role	
2023	As Long as We Both Shall Live	Kōji Tatsuishi		
2024	Dangerous Cops: Home Coming	Hayato Shishido		

== Stage plays and musicals ==
Year	Title	Role	Notes
2011	The Prince of Tennis Musical 2nd Season: Seigaku vs. Fudomine	Ryoma Echizen	
2011	The Prince of Tennis Musical 2nd Season: Seigaku vs. St. Rudolph & Yamabuki	Ryoma Echizen	
2011	The Prince of Tennis Musical 2nd Season: Seigaku vs. Hyotei	Ryoma Echizen	
2011	The Prince of Tennis Musical 2nd Season: Dream Live 2011	Ryoma Echizen	
2012	The Prince of Tennis Musical 2nd Season: Seigaku vs. Rokkaku	Ryoma Echizen	
2012	The Prince of Tennis Musical 2nd Season: Undoukai 2012	Ryoma Echizen	
2012	The Prince of Tennis Musical 2nd Season: Seigaku vs. Rikkai	Ryoma Echizen	
2012	The Prince of Tennis Musical 2nd Season: Seigaku Farewell Party	Ryoma Echizen	
2012 - 2013	The Prince of Tennis Musical 2nd Season: Seigaku vs. Higa	Ryoma Echizen	
2013	The Prince of Tennis Musical 2nd Season: Dream Live 2013	Ryoma Echizen	
2013	The Prince of Tennis Musical 2nd Season: Seigaku vs. Hyotei ~ Nationals	Ryoma Echizen	
2013 - 2014	The Prince of Tennis Musical 2nd Season: Seigaku vs. Shitenhoji	Ryoma Echizen	
2014	The Prince of Tennis Musical 2nd Season: Undoukai 2014	Ryoma Echizen	
2014	The Prince of Tennis Musical 2nd Season: Seigaku vs. Rikkai ~ Nationals	Ryoma Echizen	
2014	The Prince of Tennis Musical 2nd Season: Dream Live 2014	Ryoma Echizen	
2015	Rock Opera: Psychedelic Pain	Shion	
2015	Tokyo Ghoul Stage Play 2015	Ken Kaneki	
2015	Yowamushi Pedal IRREGULAR: The Two Peaks	Sakamichi Onoda	
2016	Yowamushi Pedal ~Sohoku's New Generation Begins~	Sakamichi Onoda	
2016	The Prince of Tennis Musical 3rd Season: Dream Live 2016	Himself	Guest
2016 - 2017	Musical Touken Ranbu Bakumatsu Tenrouden	Horikawa Kunihiro	
2016	Musical Touken Ranbu in Itsukushima Shrine	Horikawa Kunihiro	
2016	Musical Touken Ranbu: Shinken Ranbu Sai 2016	Horikawa Kunihiro	
2017	Doraemon: Nobita and the Animal Planet	Nobita Nobi	
2023	Hunter X Hunter The Stage	Kurapika	
2024	Hunter X Hunter The Stage 2	Kurapika	
2024-2025	Jujutsu Kaisen 0 Tokyo Toritsu Jujutsu Kōtō Senmon Gakkō	Yuta Okkotsu	
