= A Kiss =

A Kiss may refer to:

- "A Kiss", single by Mario Lanza written Sinatra, Brooks
- "A Kiss", Russian art song by Dargomïzhsky

== See also ==
- Kiss (disambiguation)
