= Koe Girl! =

Japanese television series

- 声ガール!
- Screenplay by: Kōta Fukuhara; Shinya Hokimoto
- Directed by: Natsuki Seta; Toshiki Sōma; Kyōhei Tamazawa
- Starring: Haruka Fukuhara; Aoi Yoshikura; Mariya Nagao; Yurika Nakamura; Jun Amaki
- Composer: Shōji Ikenaga
- Country of origin: Japan
- Original language: Japanese
- No. of episodes: 10

Production
- Production company: ABC Television

Original release
- Network: TV Asahi, ABC TV
- Release: April 8 – June 10, 2018

Related
- Pretty Cure

Koe Girl! (声ガール!, Koe Gāru!; lit. "Voice Girl!") is a Japanese television series starring Haruka Fukuhara, Aoi Yoshikura, Mariya Nagao, Yurika Nakamura, and Jun Amaki. The series focuses on the lives of five aspiring voice actresses who live together in a dorm, and follows their goal of becoming established in the voice acting industry. It premiered on TV Asahi on April 8, 2018. The series ran for ten episodes, with the last episode premiering on June 10, 2018. The series is a spin-off of the Pretty Cure multimedia franchise, but does not directly feature its story or universe.

== Plot ==
The series follows Makoto Kikuchi, the daughter of a grocery shop owner who has no experience in voice acting or acting. Her life changes when she is scouted to be a voice actress, which leads her to live in a dorm with four other newcomers: Ryōko Ochiai, a former child actress, Ren Inaba, a fan of the PreCure franchise, Asami Kuriyama, who Makoto later considers to be her rival, and Konatsu Morimoto, who originally hails from Kansai. The series depicts their journey of becoming voice actors, showing their voice acting lessons and other events in their lives.

== Characters ==
- Haruka Fukuhara as Makoto Kikuchi (菊池 真琴, Kikuchi Makoto), the daughter of a grocery shop owner. She knew nothing about voice acting until she was scouted.
- Yurika Nakamura as Asami Kuriyama (栗山 麻美, Kuriyama Asami), a young girl who is later considered by Makoto to be her rival.
- Mariya Nagao as Ren Ineba (稲葉 蓮, Ineba Ren), an otaku who has deep admiration for the PreCure franchise.
- Jun Amaki as Konatsu Morimoto (森本 小夏, Konatsu Morimoto), a girl originally from the Kansai region who tends to speak in the Kansai dialect. She serves as the group's moodmaker.
- Aoi Yoshikura as Ryōko Ochiai (落合 涼子, Ochiai Ryōko), a former child actress who decided to pivot to voice acting. She is the eldest among five children and takes care of her four siblings.
- Haruka Tomatsu as herself, a popular voice actress who notices Makoto's talent during an acting test. She serves as a mentor for the group.

== Production and release ==
The series was produced as part of the franchise's 15th anniversary. Produced by Asahi Broadcasting Corporation and Fine Entertainment, the series is directed by Natsuki Seta, Toshiki Sōma, and Kyōhei Tamazawa, and is written by Kōta Fukuhara and Shinya Hokimoto. The series premiered on TV Asahi on April 8, 2018, and will run for 10 episodes. Voice actors Haruka Tomatsu, Daisuke Namikawa, Noriko Hidaka, and Mitsuo Iwata appear as themselves in the series. Footage of Tomatsu performing at a concert the song "Q&A Recital", used as the opening theme to the anime series My Little Monster, is used in the series' seventh episode. The series' ending theme is "It's Show Time!" by Tomatsu and Haruka Fukuhara.
