= Bésame Mucho (disambiguation) =

Bésame Mucho is a classic Mexican 1940s song in Spanish.

Bésame Mucho (Spanish: Kiss Me A Lot) may also refer to:

== Music ==
- Besame Mucho (album), a jazz album by Art Pepper
- Besame Mucho, a 1987 an album by Topi Sorsakoski
- Bésame Mucho, a 1999 album by Ricardo Moyano
- Bésame mucho, el musical, a 2005 Mexican musical

== Film ==
- Bésame mucho, a 1945 Mexican film with Blanquita Amaro
- Besame Mucho (1987 film), a Brazilian film
- Bésame mucho (1995 film), a Colombian film
- Besame mucho, a 1999 Italian comedy film directed by Maurizio Ponzi
- Besame Mucho, a 2000 Israeli film with Ryan Early and Eli Danker

== See also ==
- Kiss me a lot (disambiguation), equivalent to the Spanish "bésame mucho"
