= Kissin =

Kissin may refer to:

- Kissing, the physically affectionate act of a kiss
- A variant transliteration of the Russian-language surname Kisin (surname)
  - Evgeny Kissin (born 1971), a Russian classical pianist
- Joel Kissin, a British restaurateur
- Kissin, Syria, a village in central Syria
- KIZN, branded as Kissin' 92, a radio station in Boise, Idaho
- A name of the star 21 or 23 Comae Berenices

== See also ==
- Kiss (disambiguation)
