= C. Jérôme =

French singer

Background information
- Also known as: Charles Jérôme
- Born: Claude Dhotel; 21 December 1946; Paris
- Died: 14 March 2000 (aged 53)
- Occupations: singer

Claude Dhotel (born 21 December 1946 in Paris, France; died 14 March 2000), better known by his stage name C. Jérôme, was a French singer.

In 1972, Jérôme's first big hit Kiss Me reached number 1 place in the French music charts, 3 in Austria, 4th in Belgium, and 5 in Switzerland. More than a million copies have been sold.

C.Jérôme died 14 March 2000, aged 53. He is buried at the graveyard of Boulogne-Billancourt.
