= I Became the Main Role of a BL Drama =

Japanese manga series

- Cover of vol. 1 of the Japanese version, released on January 28, 2022

BLドラマの主演になりました (BL Dorama no Shuen ni Narimashita)
- Genre: Boys' love, comedy
- Manga
- Written by: Machi Suzuri
- Published by: Ichijinsha
- Imprint: Comic Pool
- Magazine: Comic Pool
- Original run: January 24, 2022 – May 16, 2025
- Volumes: 5
- Television drama
- Directed by: Izuru Kumasaka
- Produced by: Emi Fujisaki; Sho Sejima
- Written by: Erika Tōyama
- Studio: Studio Blue
- Licensed by: GagaOOLala
- Original network: Telasa; TV Asahi (Crank Up Arc)
- Original run: December 24, 2023 – July 25, 2025
- Episodes: 9

I Became the Main Role of a BL Drama (Japanese: BLドラマの主演になりました, Hepburn: BL Dorama no Shuen ni Narimashita) is a Japanese manga series by Machi Suzuri. It was originally posted on Suzuri's Twitter and Pixiv accounts in 2020. It was later serialized on Pixiv Comics' website under the Comic Pool label (a partnership between Ichijinsha and Pixiv). The manga was serialized on a weekly basis from January 24, 2022, to May 16, 2025.

A live-action television drama adaptation, consisting of three episodes, was divided into two arcs: the Crank In Arc (Note: "Crank in" (クランクイン, kuranku in) is a wasei-eigo term meaning "the beginning of a film shoot."), consisting of the first episode that was broadcast on Telasa on December 24, 2023; and the Crank Up Arc (Note: "Crank up" (クランクアップ, kuranku appu) is a wasei-eigo term meaning "wrap."), the final two episodes that were broadcast on TV Asahi on January 2, 2024. A second season ran from June 13, 2025, to July 25, 2025, for six episodes on Telasa.

== Plot ==
Hajime Aoyanagi is an actor who first became famous after starring in an orange juice commercial as a child 15 years ago, but since then, his popularity has been fading. One day, he gets cast in his first leading role in years, in a drama based on a boys' love (BL) manga titled I'm in Love with My Childhood Friend (恋する俺とおさななじみ, Koisuru Ore to Osananajimi). Aoyanagi is starring opposite of Yuichiro Akafuji, a younger and popular actor. Unknown to Aoyanagi, Akafuji has secretly been a huge fan of him since childhood, but he inadvertently treats him coldly because he is too starstruck.

== Characters ==
Hajime Aoyanagi (青柳 萌, Aoyanagi Hajime)
Portrayed by: Nichika Akutsu
Aoyanagi is a 25-year-old actor who first gained fame after starring in an orange juice commercial 15 years ago. Once heralded as a "genius child actor", he is no longer popular and struggles to receive roles. He plays Haruhi Mizutani (水谷 春日, Mizutani Haruhi) in I'm in Love With My Childhood Friend.
Yuichiro Akafuji (赤藤 優一郎, Akafuji Yūichirō)
Portrayed by: Alan Abe
Akafuji is a 23-year-old actor. He is described as good-looking and is currently one of the most popular actors. He has admired Aoyanagi since they were young, and he ends up treating Aoyanagi coldly during his attempts to hide his adoration for him. He plays Akifumi Momoshiro (桃城 晃史, Momoshiro Akifumi) in I'm in Love With My Childhood Friend.
Joji Kijima (黄島 譲二, Kijima Jōji)
Portrayed by: Shu Watanabe
Kijima is Aoyanagi's manager and a former actor. He and Yukari have a complicated relationship.
Hiroomi Yukari (紫 宏臣, Yukari Hiro'omi)
Portrayed by: Yuki Ogoe
Yukari is Akafuji's manager. He tends to get exasperated by Akafuji's fanaticism over Aoyanagi. He and Kijima have a friends-with-benefits relationship, though he secretly used to be a fan of Kiijima.
Ryoga Kuromiya (黒宮 遼河, Kuromiya Ryōga)
Portrayed by: Shogo Iwaya
Kuromiya is a member of the idol group East6 and plays Kurokawa (黒川), a character who works in the same company as Mizutani and Momoshiro, in I'm in Love With My Childhood Friend.
Nanami Tendo (天道 菜々美, Tendō Nanami)
Portrayed by: Sakurako Konishi
Tendo is a 29-year-old actress who plays Natsuko Mizutani (水谷 夏子, Mizutani Natsuko), Mizutani's older sister, in I'm in Love With My Childhood Friend.
Yayoi (弥生)
Portrayed by: Noriko Iriyama
Yayoi is the producer of I'm in Love With My Childhood Friend.
Ryunosuke Haibara (灰原 龍之介, Haibara Ryūnosuke)
Portrayed by: Robin Furuya
Haibara is Aoyanagi's senior who has worked with him when he was little. He views himself as Aoyanagi's older brother and sees Akafuji as his rival.

== Production ==
Suzuri was inspired to draw I Became the Main Role of a BL Drama from watching BL dramas after a "certain drama featuring middle-aged men" and wanting to write a story where the seme was "madly in love" with the uke. Suzuri then posted a series of illustrations and, later, short comics titled I Became the Main Role of a Live-Action Adaptation of a BL (実写化BLの主演になりました) on her Twitter account; she compiled and uploaded the chapters to her Pixiv account on December 26, 2020. At the time of when she first drew the manga, she was unfamiliar with how live-action drama adaptations were produced.

Suzuri stated through an interview with Chil Chil that she originally wanted to include a comic centered on I'm in Love with My Childhood Friend, a fictional manga featured in the series, in volume 1. However, due to the timing and the number of pages, she was not able to include it in the end. When her editor noticed that a manga volume without a dust cover resembled a script booklet, Suzuri included a script featuring the storyline of I'm in Love with My Childhood Friend.

== Media ==
=== Manga ===
I Became the Main Role of a BL Drama is written and illustrated by Machi Suzuri. After posting several illustrations and short manga based on the concept under the title I Became the Main Role in a Live-Action Adaptation of a BL on Twitter and Pixiv in 2020, the manga was later picked up for serialization on Pixiv Comics' website under the Comic Pool label (a partnership between Ichijinsha and Pixiv). It was serialized on a weekly basis from January 23, 2022, (Note: The list of chapters on Comic Pool shows that the first chapter was uploaded on January 23, 2022.) to May 31, 2024. A continuation, titled the Lovers Arc, was serialized in Comic Pool from October 4, 2024, to June 12, 2025. The chapters were later released in five bound volumes by Ichijinsha under the Comic Pool imprint.

No.	Japanese release date	Japanese ISBN
1	January 28, 2022	978-4-7580-1742-8
2	October 7, 2022	978-4-7580-1782-4
3	August 2, 2023	978-4-7580-1829-6
4	May 31, 2024	978-4-7580-1899-9
5	June 12, 2025	978-4-7580-1995-8

=== Television drama ===
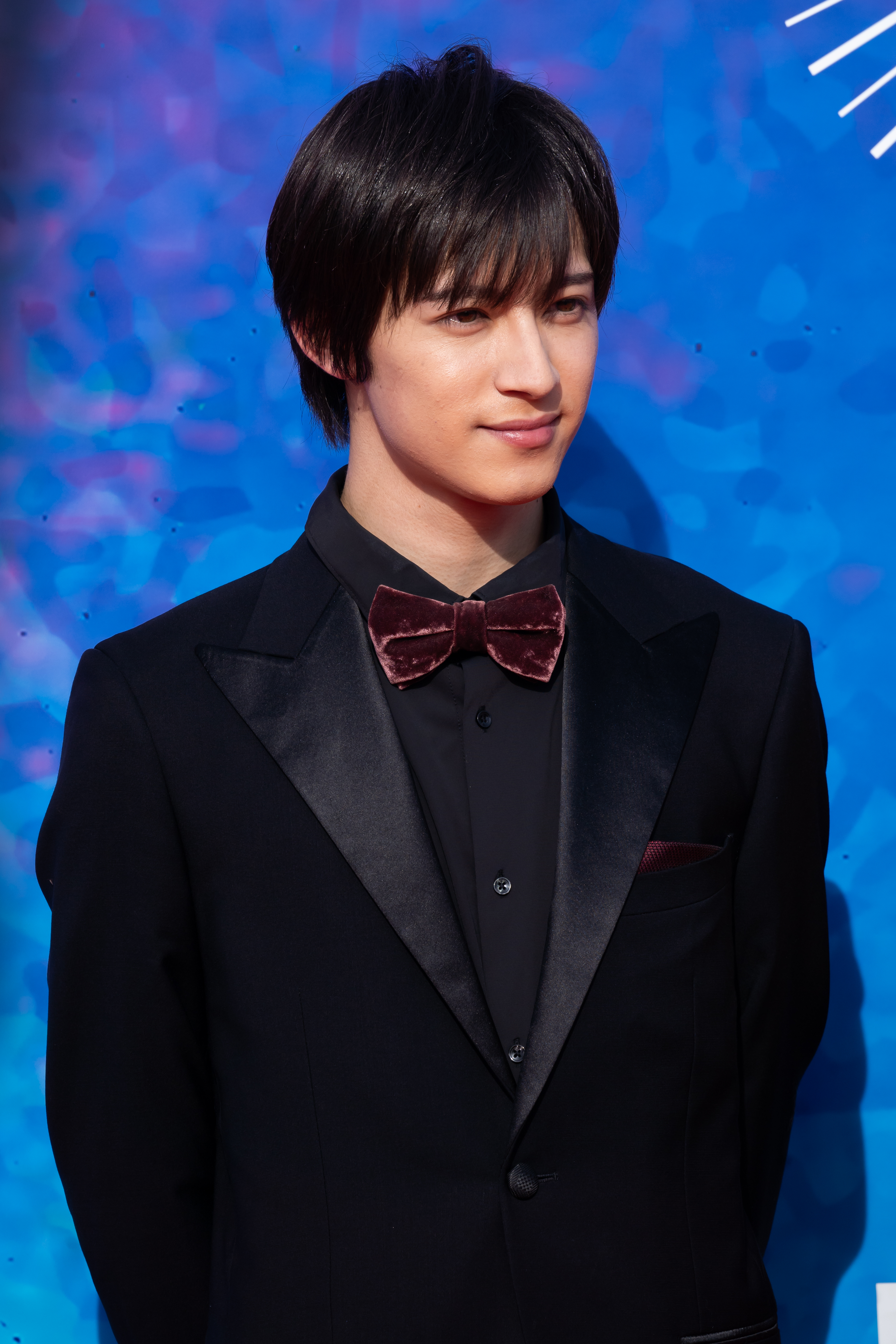
Nichika Akutsu (pictured in 2023) starred as Aoyanagi in the live-action television drama adaptation.

A live-action television drama adaptation of I Became the Main Role of a BL Drama was announced on November 20, 2023. The Crank In Arc (クランクイン編), consisting of the first episode, was broadcast on Telasa on December 24, 2023. The Crank Up Arc (クランクアップ編), consisting of the last 2 episodes, was broadcast on TV Asahi on January 2, 2024. (Note: TV Asahi lists the broadcast date as January 1, 2024, at 24:25, which is January 2, 2024, at 12:25 AM.) The series is directed by Izuru Kumasaka, with Erika Tōyama in charge of the script. The live-action drama adaptation is produced by Emi Fujisaki from TV Asahi and Sho Sejima from Studio Blue.

The series stars 7Order member Alan Abe as Akafuji and Nichika Akutsu as Aoyanagi. Supporting cast members include The Rampage from Exile Tribe member Shogo Iwaya as Kuromiya, Shu Watanabe as Kijima, Yuki Ogoe as Yukari, Sakurako Konishi as Tendo, and Noriko Iriyama as Yayoi. The theme song of the series is "Darlin'" by Deep.

On December 5, 2024, I Became the Main Role of a BL Drama was renewed for a second season, titled Zoku: BL Drama no Shuen ni Narimashita (続・BLドラマの主演になりました) in Japan. The second season began broadcast on Telasa on June 13, 2025, and ran for 6 episodes. The cast reprised their roles, with Robin Furuya and Gaku Oshida added to the supporting cast as Ryunosuke Haibara and Wakaba Yamabuki respectively. The theme song is "Kissed the Pillow" by Rui.

Both seasons were licensed for streaming outside of Japan by GagaOOLala with English subtitles. GagaOOLala reported that the first season was one of the top 5 series in Taiwan on their platform in 2023.

==== Season 1 (2023) ====
===== Crank In Arc =====
No. overall	No. in season	Title	Directed by	Written by	Original release date
1	1	"Can We Practice Kissing?"; Transliteration: "Kisu Nerishite mo Ii desu ka?" (Japanese: キス練してもいいですか?)	Izuru Kumasaka	Erika Tōyama	December 24, 2023
Aoyanagi and Akafuji are cast as love interests in the drama adaptation of the manga I'm in Love with My Childhood Friend, and to bring them closer together, Yayoi suggests they live together. Aoyanagi feels discouraged when Akafuji treats him coldly, when in reality, Akafuji is a die-hard fan of his. Aoyanagi confronts Akafuji over his behavior during a drunken stupor, but Akafuji reassures him that he does not hate him, and the two start getting along better. Akafuji starts feeling less nervous around Aoyanagi, until he realizes that the two will have a kiss scene.

===== Crank Up Arc =====
No. overall	No. in season	Title	Directed by	Written by	Original release date
2	2	"I'm Watching"; Transliteration: "Boku ga Mitemasu" (Japanese: 僕が見てます)	Izuru Kumasaka	Erika Tōyama	January 2, 2024
Akafuji starts avoiding Aoyanagi after the latter reveals he once had a girlfriend, but through Kuromiya, he realizes that he was jealous and loves Aoyanagi for real. After Aoyanagi and Akafuji resolve their concerns, they promise each other that they will make the drama successful and practice kissing. The next day, Yayoi reveals that she has decided to take out the kiss scene for the drama, leaving Aoyanagi confused about his feelings for Akafuji.
3	3	"I Love You to the Point that I'm Hopeless"; Transliteration: "Dōshiyō mo Nai Kurai, Suki" (Japanese: どうしようもないくらい、好き)	Izuru Kumasaka	Erika Tōyama	January 2, 2024
Akafuji and Tendō are photographed together by a tabloid, plaguing the production with dating rumors between them. Aoyanagi gets upset with Akafuji, but he later discovers that he is in love with him. When he locates Akafuji's apartment, he discovers that Akafuji has been a huge fan of him for years. The two reveal their feelings for each other, as Akafuji reveals that he has been in love ever since they had met in high school and Aoyanagi had accepted him for who he truly was. Soon after, Yayoi decides to add the kiss scene back and the drama shoot comes to a conclusion.

==== Season 2 (2025) ====
No. overall	No. in season	Title	Directed by	Written by	Original release date
4	1	"After the Kiss"; Transliteration: "Kisu no Saki" (Japanese: キスの先)	Izuru Kumasaka	Erika Tōyama	June 13, 2025
5	2	"The Other Side of Pi"; Transliteration: "Enshūritsu no Mukōgawa" (Japanese: 円周率の向こう側)	Izuru Kumasaka	Erika Tōyama	June 20, 2025
6	3	"Ultra Quiz Contest About Hajime"; Transliteration: "Hajime-chan Sōdatsu Urutora Kuizu" (Japanese: 萌ちゃん争奪ウルトラクイズ)	Izuru Kumasaka	Erika Tōyama	June 27, 2025
7	4	"Secret"; Transliteration: "Himitsu" (Japanese: 秘密)	Izuru Kumasaka	Erika Tōyama	July 11, 2025
8	5	"Love Panic in Izu"; Transliteration: "Rabu Panikku Izu" (Japanese: ラブパニック伊豆)	Izuru Kumasaka	Erika Tōyama	July 18, 2025
9	6	"Welcome Home"; Transliteration: "Okaeri Nasai" (Japanese: おかえりなさい)	Izuru Kumasaka	Erika Tōyama	July 25, 2025
