= Kiss You (disambiguation) =

"Kiss You" is a 2013 song by One Direction.

Kiss You may also refer to:

- "Kiss You", 2005 song by iiO
- Kiss You, 2002 EP and song by Naozumi Takahashi
- "Kiss You", 1959 song by Tony Bennett
- "Kiss You", 2000 song by Keith Sweat from Didn't See Me Coming
- "Kiss You", 2000 song by Tyrone Davis from Relaxin' with Tyrone
- "Kiss You", 2005 song by Exile from compilation Single Best
- "Kiss You (When It's Dangerous)", 1986 song by Eight Seconds

== See also ==
- Kiss Me (disambiguation)
- Kiss (disambiguation)
