= Kill Me Kiss Me =

Kill Me Kiss Me may refer to:

- Kill Me, Kiss Me, a Korean manhwa
- Kill Me Kiss Me (album), a 2008 album by Hangry & Angry

== See also ==
- Kiss Me, Kill Me (disambiguation)
