= Marching: Ashita e =

- Theatrical release poster
- Directed by: Shinichi Nakada
- Screenplay by: Keiko Seki; Teppei Harada
- Story by: Shinichi Nakada
- Produced by: Takashi Kasakura; Masaru Koibuchi; Hiroshi Misago
- Starring: Dori Sakurada; Mansaku Fuwa; Kento Hayashi; Ryōga Hayashi; Terumasa Hino
- Cinematography: Kazuo Okuhara
- Edited by: Hideaki Ohata
- Music by: Takana Miyamoto
- Release date: May 14, 2014 (Japan)
- Running time: 113 minutes
- Country: Japan
- Language: Japanese

Marching: Ashita e (Japanese: MARCHING-明日へ-), also known as Marching -Asu e- or Marching to Tomorrow, is 2014 Japanese drama film directed by Shinichi Nakada.

== Cast ==
- Dori Sakurada as Tadanobu
- Mansaku Fuwa
- Kento Hayashi
- Ryōga Hayashi as Yosuke
- Terumasa Hino
- Hōshi Ishida as Katsuo
- Kazue Itō
- Yoshiko Kayama
- Ryoko Kobayashi as Misaki
- Rin Mizumoto as Shiori
- Mayumi Oka
- Teruhiko Saigō
- Toshiya Sakai
- Kazuhiro Sawada
- Seika Taketomi as Mari
