= Haruka Fukuhara =

Japanese actress

- 福原 遥
- Born: August 28, 1998 (age 28); Saitama Prefecture, Japan
- Occupations: Actress; singer; model
- Years active: 2005–present
- Agents: Next Entertainment (2005-2015); Ken-On (2015-present)
- Spouse: Takefusa Kubo (m. 2026)
- Musical career
- Genre: J-Pop
- Instrument: Vocals
- Years active: 2019–present
- Label: Sony Music Entertainment (Japan) Inc.
- Website: www.ken-on.co.jp/haruka

Haruka Fukuhara (福原 遥, Fukuhara Haruka; born August 28, 1998) is a Japanese actress, singer, and model from Saitama Prefecture. From 2009 to 2012, she starred in Cooking Idol! I! My! Main as Main Hiiragi, portraying the character in both animated and live-action segments. Following the series' end, she has starred in multiple television and film projects including Good Morning Call, Futari Monologue, Koe Girl!, Coffee & Vanilla, Hitsuji to Ōkami no Koi to Satsu-jin, and Laid-Back Camp. In animation, Fukuhara has provided the voice to Himari Arisugawa/Cure Custard in Kirakira PreCure a la Mode.

Aside from releasing songs for Cooking Idol! I! My! Main early in her career, in 2019, Fukuhara released her solo debut single, "Mikanseina Hikari-tachi."

== Career ==
Haruka Fukuhara started working as a child actress from the first grade of elementary school.

Since 2009, she plays and voices the leading role of Main Hiiragi in Cookin' Idol I! My! Mine!, a part anime, part live action show on NHK.

In 2012, she won a grand prix in the 20th audition for the teen fashion magazine Pichi Lemon, in which 9,000 people took part. Since then, she has worked as a model for the magazine.

On February 13, 2013, she released her fifth single, titled "Nameko no Uta" (なめこのうた; "Nameko Song"). The music video for the title track had been already watched 6.8 million times on YouTube by February 7. The music video is animated. The song by Fukuhara had been already released on a Various Artists' compilation titled Nameko no CD in July 2012; the song had been also chosen as an ending theme for the musical show Music-ruTV (musicるTV) on TV Asahi.

== Personal life ==
On 2 October 2026, she announced her marriage to Japanese footballer Takefusa Kubo on her social media.

== Filmography ==
=== Live-action ===
==== Films ====
Year	Title	Role	Notes	Ref(s)
2006	Harugasumi	Kana Natori		
2008	Kids	a girl at the park		
2009	Dance Subaru	Mana Kureha (young)		
2014	Ressha Sentai ToQger the Movie: Galaxy Line S.O.S.	Lady		
2015	Ressha Sentai ToQger vs. Kyoryuger: The Movie	Lady		
2015	Pirameki's Children Story	Natsumi Kamei		
2016	Mars	Shiori Sakurazawa		
2017	Let's Go, Jets!	Ayumi Nagai		
2017	Girl's Play	Saaya Honjō	Lead role	
2017	Doubutsu Sentai Zyuohger vs. Ninninger the Movie: Super Sentai's Message from the Future	Runrun (voice)		
2019	You Are Brilliant Like a Spica	Sei Saotome	Lead role	
2019	Kakegurui – Compulsive Gambler	Julie Arukibi		
2019	My Girlfriend is a Serial Killer	Rio Miyaichi	Lead role	
2021	Kaguya-sama Final: Love Is War	Tsubame Koyasu	Reprises role from anime	
2023	Till We Meet Again on the Lily Hill	Yuri Kano	Lead role	
2025	Kaede	Ako	Lead role	
2026	The Honest Realtor: The Movie	Sakura Tsukishita		
2026	Kyojo: Reunion	Megumi Oshino		
2026	Till We Meet Again on the Starry Hill	Yuri Kano	Lead role	

==== Television ====
Year	Title	Role	Notes	Ref(s)
2005	Time for Love	Young Kaori Hayakawa	Episode 3	
2007	Angels with Broken Wings 2007	Young Kana Nakagawa	Episode 3	
2007	Negima! Magister Negi Magi: Mahō Sensei Negima!	Young Ayaka Yukihiro	Episode 2	
2008	One-pound Gospel	Young Seiko Mukōda	Episode 1	
2008	Edison's Mother	Maaya Miyagi		
2008	Tokyo Ghost Trip	Young Mai Hashimoto	Episode 7	
2008	Monster Parent	Ayane Fujimaki	Episode 7	
2016	Good Morning Call	Nao Yoshikawa	Lead role	
2016	Mars	Shiori Sakurazawa		
2017	Futari Monologue	Hinata Omimura	Lead role	
2017	Good Morning Call: Our Campus Days	Nao Yoshikawa	Lead role	
2018	Koe Girl!	Makoto Kikuchi	Lead role	
2019	Kakegurui – Compulsive Gambler	Julie Arukibi		
2019	Mr. Hiiragi's Homeroom	Suzune Minakoshi		
2019	Coffee & Vanilla	Risa Shiragi	Lead role	
2019	Cheat	Maruyama Mizuki		
2019	Nippon Noir	Suzune Minakoshi		
2020	Laid-Back Camp	Rin Shima	Lead role	
2020	Rent-A-Person Who Does Nothing	Shimabukuro Kana	Episode 3	
2021	Date My Daughter!	Saori Itō		
2021	Cyber Crimes Unit	Kizuna Komiyama		
2021	Unlucky Girl!	Sachi Fukura	Lead role	
2021	Kyojo 2	Megumi Oshino	Miniseries	
2022	The Problem With Kids These Days	Ayumi Mugita		
2022–23	Soar High!	Mai Iwakura	Lead role; Asadora	
2022–24	The Honest Realtor	Sakura Tsukishita	2 seasons	
2023	18/40: Unbreakable Bond of Dreams	Arisu Nakagawa	Lead role	
2024	Invisible Us	Aoi Nakagawa	Lead role	
2025	Unbound	Tagasode	Taiga drama	

=== Anime ===
==== Films ====
Year	Title	Role	Notes	Ref(s)
2017	Pretty Cure Dream Stars!	Himari Arisugawa / Cure Custard		
2017	KiraKira PreCure à la Mode: Crisply! The Memory of Mille-feuille!	Himari Arisugawa / Cure Custard		
2018	Pretty Cure Super Stars!	Himari Arisugawa / Cure Custard		
2018	Hugtto! PreCure Futari wa Pretty Cure: All Stars Memories	Himari Arisugawa / Cure Custard		
2019	Pretty Cure Miracle Universe	Himari Arisugawa / Cure Custard		
2019	Hello World	Mirei Kadenokōji		
2021	Sing a Bit of Harmony	Satomi Amano		
2021	Hula Fulla Dance	Hiwa Natsunagi	Lead role	
2022	Kaguya-sama: Love Is War – The First Kiss That Never Ends	Tsubame Koyasu		

==== Television ====
Year	Title	Role	Notes	Ref(s)
2009–2013	Cookin' Idol I! My! Mine!	Main	Lead role	
2016–2017	Nameko: Sekai no Tomodachi	Nameko	Lead role	
2017	Anpanman	Wanko-chan	Episode 1385	
2017–2018	Kirakira PreCure a la Mode	Himari Arisugawa / Cure Custard	Lead role	
2018	After the Rain	Yui Nishida		
2018	Hugtto! PreCure	Himari Arisugawa / Cure Custard	Cameo	
2020–2022	Kaguya-sama: Love Is War	Tsubame Koyasu	Reprises role in live action and sings the ending of season 2	

== Discography ==
=== Singles ===
Title	Year	Peak chart positions		Sales	Album
Title	Year	JPN	JPN Hot	Sales	Album
"Mikanseina Hikari-tachi" (未完成な光たち)	2019	26	—	TBA	TBA
"Toumei Clear" (透明クリア)	2020	36	—	TBA	TBA
"Kaze Ni Fukarete" (風に吹かれて)	2020	—	—	TBA	TBA
"—" denotes releases that did not chart or were not released in that region.

=== Soundtrack appearances ===
==== Albums ====
Title	Year	Album details	Peak chart positions		Sales
Title	Year	Album details	JPN	JPN Hot	Sales
Koro-chan Pack: Cooking Idol I! My! Main! (コロちゃんパック クッキンアイドル アイ!マイ!まいん!)	2010	Released: October 22, 2010; Label: Nippon Columbia; Formats: CD	—	—	TBA
"—" denotes releases that did not chart or were not released in that region.

==== Singles ====
Title	Year	Peak chart positions		Sales	Other artist(s)	Album
Title	Year	JPN	JPN Hot	Sales	Other artist(s)	Album
"Kitchen wa My Stage" (キッチンはマイステージ)	2009	18	—	TBA	—N/a	Koro-chan Pack: Cooking Idol I! My! Main
"Miracle Melody Harmony" (ミラクル☆メロディハーモニー)	2010	47	—	TBA	—N/a	Non-album single
"Happy Recipe" (ハッピーレシピ)	2010	141	—	TBA	Senka Deno (as Sweet Main and Lovely Michika)	Non-album single
"Waku Waku Kitchen Carnival" (ワクワク♥キッチンカーニバル)	2011	102	—	TBA	—N/a	Non-album single
"Happy! Cooking Time" (ハッピー!クッキンタイム♪)	2012	—	—	TBA	—N/a	Non-album single
"Nameko no Uta" (なめこのうた)	2013	24	—	TBA	—N/a	Non-album single
"Pikatto! Ahatto! Taisō" (ピカッと!アハッと!体操)	2013	—	—	TBA	Suienser Girls	Non-album single
"Kirakira PreCure a la Mode: Sweet Etude 2: Cure Custard: Petit-Pati-Science" (キラキラ☆プリキュアアラモード sweet etude 2 キュアカスタード プティ*パティ∞サイエンス)	2017	75	—	TBA	—N/a	Kirakira PreCure a la Mode: Vocal Best Album: Sweet Etude Album
"—" denotes releases that did not chart or were not released in that region.

==== Other songs ====
Title	Year	Peak chart positions		Sales	Album
Title	Year	JPN	JPN Hot	Sales	Album
"Machidōshi" (待ち遠しいの)	2009	—	—	—N/a	Cooking Idol I! My! Main! Main Uta no Recipe 1
"Chigireta Yume" (ちぎれた夢)	2009	—	—	—N/a	Cooking Idol I! My! Main! Main Uta no Recipe 1
"Tamago no Waltz" (たまごのワルツ)	2009	—	—	—N/a	Cooking Idol I! My! Main! Main Uta no Recipe 1
"—" denotes releases that did not chart or were not released in that region.

== Awards and nominations ==
Year	Award	Category	Work(s)	Result	Ref(s)
2024	47th Japan Academy Film Prize	Newcomer of the Year	Till We Meet Again on the Lily Hill	Won	
