= Kiss (disambiguation) =

A kiss is a touch with the lips, usually to express love or affection, or as part of a greeting.

Kiss, Kisses, KISS, or K.I.S.S. may also refer to:

== Arts and entertainment ==
=== Books ===
- Kiss (comics), any of several comics featuring the rock band
- Kiss (Irish magazine), for teens
- Kiss (Japanese magazine), a manga magazine published by Kodansha
- Kiss (Wilson novel), a 2007 young adult novel
- Kiss (Dekker novel), 2009
- Kiss Trilogy, a series of novels by Debbie Viguié

=== Film and television ===
- Kiss (1963 film), directed by Andy Warhol
- Kiss (2013 film), a Telugu romantic comedy directed by Adivi Sesh
- Kiss (2019 film), a Kannada film directed by A. P. Arjun
- Kiss (2022 film), Hindi short film
- Kiss (2025 film), Tamil film by Sathish Krishnan
- Kisses (1922 film), an American silent comedy film
- Kisses (1957 film), a Japanese film by Yasuzō Masumura
- Kisses (2008 film), an Irish drama directed by Lance Daly
- "Kiss" (Band of Gold), a 1996 television episode
- "Kiss" (Dawson's Creek), a 1998 television episode
- "Kiss" (Shifting Gears), a 2025 television episode
- Kiss: The Series, a 2016 Thai television series
- Kiss TV, a UK music channel

=== Music ===
==== Bands ====
- Kiss (band), an American hard rock/heavy metal group
- Kiss (South Korean group), a female pop trio
- Kisses (band), a duo from Los Angeles, California

==== Albums ====
- Kiss (Kiss album), 1974
- Kiss (Bad Boys Blue album)
- Kiss, a 2000 album by Les Wampas
- Kiss (L'Arc-en-Ciel album), 2007
- K.I.S.S. (Keep It Sexy & Simple), a 2011 studio album by Mýa
- Kiss (Carly Rae Jepsen album), 2012
- Kisses (album), 2019, by Anitta
- K.I.S.S, 2020, by twlv

==== EPs ====
- Kiss (The Orb EP), 1989
- Kiss (London After Midnight EP), 1995
- Kiss (Versailles EP), 2003
- Kiss (Chara EP), 2008

==== Songs and music pieces ====
- "Kiss", a 1953 Dean Martin song
- "Kiss" (Prince song), 1986
- "Kiss" (Princess Princess song), 1991
- "Kiss (When the Sun Don't Shine)", by the Vengaboys, 1999
- "Kiss" (Mai Kuraki song), 2003
- "Kiss" (Korn song), 2008
- "Kiss" (Dara song), 2009
- "Kiss" (Demi Lovato song), 2025
- "Kisses" (song), a 2024 song by Bl3ss and CamrinWatsin
- Kuss-Walzer, or "Kiss Waltz", composed by Johann Strauss II

=== Other ===
- Kiss: Psycho Circus: The Nightmare Child, a 2000 first-person shooter video game
- Kiss (pinball), two pinball game lines themed to the American rock band Kiss
- Kiss II, a 1962 pop art painting by Roy Lichtenstein
- Transformers: Kiss Players, a Japanese Transformers franchise

== Computing ==
- KISS (amateur radio protocol), a protocol used with amateur radio terminal node controllers
- Kiss Technology, a Danish entertainment technology company
- Kisekae Set System (KiSS), a dress-up paper doll file format
- KISS (algorithm), a family of pseudo-random number generators
- Kissing number (in math, number of non overlapping spheres touching one other sphere)

== Organisations ==
- Kalinga Institute of Social Sciences, a higher education institute in Odisha, India
- Keep It Straight and Simple Party, a minor political party in South Africa
- KISS NB, a minor political party in the Canadian province of New Brunswick
- Kiss Baking Company Limited, in Trinidad
- Kiss FM (disambiguation), any of several radio stations
- Kiss Network, a UK radio network

== Products ==
- Kisses (confectionery), in Britain and North America, various items of small confectionery
  - Hershey's Kisses, a chocolate candy
- Kiss, a line of consumer-level Canon EOS cameras in the Japanese market since 1993
- KISS (brand), a brand from a Japanese adult video game company
- KISS Rebreathers, a brand of scuba diving rebreathers

== Transportation ==
- Celier Kiss, a Polish gyroplane
- Stadler KISS, a currently made Swiss double-decker train

== Other uses ==
- Kiss (surname)
- DJ Kiss, American DJ, television personality, and fashion model
- Kisses Delavin (born 1999), Filipina actress and singer
- Kiss, a term used in cue sports
- KISS principle, or "Keep it simple, stupid", the concept that most systems work better when kept simple
- Kiss, a Brazilian nightclub destroyed in the Kiss nightclub fire
- Kiss (cryptanalysis), in World War II code-breaking

== See also ==
- The Kiss (disambiguation)
- Kiss You (disambiguation)
- Kiss Me (disambiguation)
- Kissin (disambiguation)
- Kisspeptin or KISS1, a human gene
