= Good Morning Call =

Media franchise based on manga of the same name

- Cover of volume 2 with Nao and Hisashi

グッドモーニング・コール (Guddo Mōningu kōru)
- Genre: Romance
- Manga
- Written by: Yue Takasuka
- Published by: Shueisha
- English publisher: Shueisha (digital)
- Imprint: Ribon Mascot Comics
- Magazine: Ribon
- Original run: September 1997 – April 2002
- Volumes: 11
- Original video animation
- Studio: Shueisha; NAS
- Released: August 2, 2001
- Runtime: 19 minutes
- Manga

Good Morning Kiss
- Written by: Yue Takasuka
- Published by: Shueisha
- Magazine: Cookie
- Original run: May 15, 2007 – present
- Volumes: 18
- Television drama
- Directed by: Yo Kawahara, Takashi Fujio
- Written by: Keiko Kanome, Yuna Suzuki, Rieko Obayashi, Yu Kanda
- Original network: Fuji TV on Demand
- Original run: February 12, 2016 – June 10, 2016
- Episodes: 17
- Television drama

Good Morning Call: Our Campus Days
- Directed by: Yo Kawahara, Kenta Noda, Eiki Shimomukai
- Produced by: Mayuko Okamoto, Akimitsu Sasaki
- Written by: Rieko Obayashi, Yuna Suzuki, Keiko Kanome
- Music by: team K
- Studio: Telepack, Fuji Television
- Original network: Fuji TV on Demand, Netflix
- Original run: September 22, 2017
- Episodes: 10

Good Morning Call (グッドモーニング・コール, Guddo Mōningu Kōru) is a Japanese shōjo manga series by Yue Takasuka that ran in the monthly magazine Ribon from 1997 to 2002. Part of the story has been adapted into an OVA. In 2007, a sequel manga, Good Morning Kiss (グッドモーニング・キス, guddomōningu kisu), was serialized in Cookie. As of December 2019, eighteen volumes have been released.

A live-action television adaptation was co-produced by Fuji TV (Japan) & Netflix (worldwide). Like the manga, the series is set in Tokyo and follows the relationships of the main characters from high school to university. Season one streamed on Fuji on Demand and Netflix Japan from February 12, 2016, to June 10, 2016. A second season aired on September 22, 2017, under the title Good Morning Call: Our Campus Days. According to the program's social media, a third season is under discussion.

== Plot ==
Teenager Nao Yoshikawa has moved into her own two bedroom apartment in the city as her parents have returned to the country to manage the family farm. However, she soon discovers that Hisashi Uehara, a good-looking schoolmate, is also moving in. Realizing that they have been scammed into renting the same apartment, they agree to become roommates in order to make the rental payment. The story follows their adventures as they try to keep their cohabitation a secret from their classmates, with Nao developing romantic feelings for Hisashi as she gets to know him better.

== Characters ==
Nao Yoshikawa (吉川 菜緒, Yoshikawa Nao)
Voiced by: Yuka Tokumitsu; Played by: Haruka Fukuhara
Nao is a teenage girl who tends to be a little air-headed and easygoing. Because of a scam in her rental agreement, she and Hisashi Uehara end up sharing an apartment until other options open up.^{Ch. 1} Nao is more often annoyed by Hisashi than attracted by his looks like her classmates. However, she begins to care about getting along with him and grows to like him more than just as a roommate. She starts to date Hisashi later in the story. At the end of the manga, Nao and Uehara move into different apartments, due to the landlady of their previous apartment having a son who wanted to rent out a room for him and his girlfriend.
Hisashi Uehara (上原 久志, Uehara Hisashi)
Voiced by: Eiji Moriyama; Played by: Shunya Shiraishi
Hisashi is a good-looking boy, and unsurprisingly has a bunch of fan-girls. He had a big crush on Yuri for 6 years (8 years in the live-action drama), but was heartbroken when she married his older brother despite her knowing about his crush on her. Later in the story, Hisashi and Nao live next door in the apartment.
Marina Konno (紺野 まりな, Konno Marina)
Voiced by: Maki Saitō; Played by: Moe Arai
Marina is Nao's best friend who keeps a book of all the hot boys she knows. Although Marina is very knowledgeable about them, she would never go out with anyone she doesn't like. Later in the story, she starts going out with Yuichi Mitsuishi.
Yuichi Mitsuishi
Played by: Shugo Nagashima
One of Nao's other best friend who is the son of a doctor.^{Ch. 3} He starts dating Marina later on in the series.
Yuri Uehara
Voiced by: Michiko Neya; Played by: Erika Mori
Yuri is Hisashi's sister-in-law^{Ch. 3} who enjoys shopping.^{Ch. 4}
Jun Abe (阿部 順, Abe Jun)
Voiced by: Ryō Naitō; Played by: Koya Nagasawa
Jun is Nao's classmate, who is called the "King of Confessions" because he often goes around asking girls out, but gets rejected every single time.
Nanako Kusanagi
Played by: Hinako Tanaka
Nanako is the fifteen-year-old daughter of the owner of the shop that Hisashi works at. Being a spoiled brat, she wants Hisashi to be her boyfriend and loves to make fun of Nao. In the final chapter, she realizes that her feelings for Hisashi were nothing more than admiration and not true love.
Issei Sata
Played by: Kentaro Ito
Issei is the son of the owner of a ramen shop.
Ota
Ota is Nao's friend in university. She is single, and often daydreams about what being in a relationship would be like.
Daichi Shinozaki
Played by: Dori Sakurada
A drama original character, Daichi is Nao's childhood friend. He usually helps out his classmates with various activities. Daichi acts kind and caring, but also protective when it comes to Nao.
Takuya Uehara
Played by: Kei Tanaka
Hisashi's handsome and successful brother and Yuri's husband.

== Media ==
=== Manga ===
Good Morning Call is written and illustrated by Yue Takasuka. It was serialized in the monthly magazine Ribon from September 1997 to April 2002. The chapters were later released in 11 bound volumes by Shueisha under the Ribon Mascot Comics imprint. In 2026, the series became licensed digitally in English on Shueisha's Manga Million platform.

A sequel to the series, titled Good Morning Kiss, is running in Cookie.

==== Good Morning Call ====
No.	Japanese release date	Japanese ISBN
1	May 15, 1998	4-08-856079-5
2	October 15, 1998	4-08-856104-X
3	March 15, 1999	4-08-856131-7
4	August 6, 1999	4-08-856157-0
5	January 14, 2000	4-08-856184-8
6	July 15, 2000	4-08-856216-X
7	December 15, 2000	4-08-856243-7
8	April 15, 2001	4-08-856273-9
9	September 15, 2001	4-08-856311-5
10	February 15, 2002	4-08-856349-2
11	May 15, 2002	4-08-856373-5

==== Good Morning Kiss ====
1. ISBN 978-4-08-856746-4 published on May 15, 2007

=== OVA ===
An original video animation adaptation of Good Morning Call was screened as a short film at the 2001 Ribon Festival on August 2, 2001, as a double-feature with Time Strange Kyoko: Leave it to Chocola!

=== Television drama ===
A live-action television drama adaptation was released weekly on Fuji on Demand and Netflix Japan starting February 12, 2016. The series stars Haruka Fukuhara as Nao Yoshikawa and Shunya Shiraishi as Hisashi Uehara. It ran for 17 episodes until June 10, 2016. It was later streamed internationally on Netflix starting May 13. It was broadcast on Fuji TV from October 12, 2016, to January 11, 2017.

A second season with 10 episodes, titled Good Morning Call: Our Campus Days was released on Fuji on Demand and Netflix Japan on September 22, 2017. The season follows Nao and Hisashi as college students. It was released internationally on Netflix on November 28, 2017.

According to the program's social media, a third season is under discussion.

==== Series overview ====
Season	Episodes	Originally released	
Season	Episodes	First released	Last released
1	17	February 12, 2016	June 10, 2016
2	10	September 22, 2017	September 22, 2017

==== Season 1 (2016) ====
No. overall	No. in season	Title	Directed by	Written by	Original release date
1	1	"Alone at Last" "Longing to live alone, a start?" Transliteration: "Akogareno hitorigurashi, hajimemasu! ?" (Japanese: 憧れの一人暮らし、はじめます!?)	Yo Kawahara	Keiko Kanome	February 12, 2016
High school girl Nao Yoshikawa is moving into a new apartment, but she discovers that the school prince, the popular but aloof Hisashi Uehara is also going to live there. They discover they've been scammed into renting the same apartment, but agree they would have to live together to afford the rent until they can find other places. Hisashi sets some house rules, including not having friends over, not entering each other's rooms, not interacting at school, or telling anyone about their living arrangement. One morning, Nao finds Hisashi has left all his alarms on but accidentally knocks over and breaks a family photo frame. Although she apologizes, he acts more cold to her. Nao learns from his friends that Hisashi lost his parents in a car crash, so she tries to buy a replacement frame. At night, she eats one of his puddings, Hisashi gets upset and scolds her. She goes out at night looking for one. Hisashi discovers Nao got him a replacement frame. Hisashi finds her hiding from a supposed assaulter, and carries her home. The next morning, Nao tries to wake Hisashi again, but he suddenly pulls Nao close and kisses her.
2	2	"A Kiss to Remember" "Sudden kiss" Transliteration: "Totsuzen no fāsutokisu" (Japanese: 突然のファーストキス)	Yo Kawahara	Yuna Suzuki	February 12, 2016
Hisashi does not recall kissing Nao. At school, Nao discovers that they accidentally have each other's gym uniform jackets. She cuts out the name from the jacket, but Hisashi has her fix it. A Uehara fan club girl who had secretly observed their interaction warns Nao not to be friendly with Hisashi. Nao's best friend Marina is suspicious that Nao is hiding something; when she visits Nao's apartment, she learns that Nao has been rooming with Hisashi. The fan club girls start bullying Nao but Hisashi rescues her and tells the girls that she is his girlfriend. He reasons that by pretending to be a couple there will be less hassle at school. He faints from exhaustion and is sent to a hospital. A beautiful young woman named Yuri arrives.
3	3	"Rumor Has It" "The secret of living together, I found out" Transliteration: "Dōkyo no himitsu, bare chatta" (Japanese: 同居の秘密、バレちゃった)	Fujio Takashi	Yuna Suzuki	February 19, 2016
Yuri turns out to be Hisashi's brother's wife and that Hisashi had a crush on her before. When Yuri wants Hisashi to come home to live with her family, Nao tries to cook up some food to coax Hisashi to stay. Marina is upset over the news that Nao and Hisashi are a couple, so Nao tries to reconcile that. When Nao tells her mother that she is doing well while living on her own, her mother says that she needs to rank in the upper half of her class in the upcoming finals or she'll have to move out. Realizing that finals are only four days away, she begs Daichi to tutor her. Yuri catches Nao after school and wants her to take her to Hisashi's place. Meanwhile, Marina and Yuichi discover Daichi is heading over, and they all end up at the apartment where Nao and Hisashi have to explain their cohabitation situation, and ask for their forgiveness and support. Hisashi ends up tutoring Nao the night before the finals, and Nao barely passes. They celebrate with some milk pudding but Nao realizes that she has fallen in love for Hisashi.
4	4	"Christmas Is Coming" "Countdown to Christmas Eve"; Transliteration: "Kurisumasu ibu made kauntodaun" (Japanese: クリスマス・イブまでカウントダウン)	Fujio Takashi	Rieko Obayashi	February 26, 2016
5	5	"Party of One" "New Year Alone"; Transliteration: "2-Ri kiri no toshikoshi" (Japanese: 2人きりの年越し)	Yo Kawahara	Keiko Kanome	March 4, 2016
6	6	"Faking Up Is Hard to Do" "Confession of love from Dai-chan?"; Transliteration: "Daichan kara ai no kokuhaku! ?" (Japanese: 大ちゃんから愛の告白!?)	Yo Kawahara	Keiko Kanome	March 11, 2016
7	7	"Baby, It's Cold Outside" "Yuki-rin's divorce declaration" Transliteration: "Yuri Rin no rikon sengen" (Japanese: ゆりりんの離婚宣言)	Takashi Fujio, Atsushi Yoshikawa	Yuna Suzuki	March 25, 2016
8	8	"He's Not Sexy, He's My Brother" "Super handsome? Uehara's brother appears" Transliteration: "Chō ikemen! ? Uehara ani tōjō" (Japanese: 超イケメン!?上原兄登場)	Atsushi Yoshikawa	Rieko Obayashi	April 1, 2016
9	9	"A Valentine Surprise" "Valentine's is coming" Transliteration: "Mōsugu Barentain" (Japanese: もうすぐバレンタイン)	Yo Kawahara	Keiko Kanome	April 8, 2016
10	10	"A Change of Scenery" "I will enter the girls dormitory!" Transliteration: "Joshi ryō ni, hairimasu! !" (Japanese: 女子寮に、入ります!!)	Yo Kawahara	Keiko Kanome	April 15, 2016
11	11	"Father Knows Best" "I was living together" Transliteration: "Bareta! ! Dōkyo kaishō" (Japanese: バレた!!同居解消)	Takashi Fujio	Keiko Kanome, Yu Kanda	April 22, 2016
12	12	"Tagging Along" "Let's set the heart on fire!" Transliteration: "Hāto ni hi o tsukero dai sakusen!" (Japanese: ハートに火をつけろ大作戦!)	Yo Kawahara	Rieko Obayashi	April 29, 2016
13	13	"The Getaway (Part 1)" "Hot springs trip is full of happenings: Part 1"; Transliteration: "Onsen ryokō wa hapuningu-darake zenpen" (Japanese: 温泉旅行はハプニングだらけ・前編)	Atsushi Yoshikawa	Yuna Suzuki	May 13, 2016
14	14	"The Getaway (Part 2)" "Hot springs trip is full of happenings: Part 2"; Transliteration: "Onsen ryokō wa hapuningu-darake kōhen" (Japanese: 温泉旅行はハプニングだらけ・後編)	Yo Kawahara	Yuna Suzuki	May 20, 2016
15	15	"Surprise!" (Japanese: Happy Birthday!?)	Kenji Yamauchi	Rieko Obayashi	May 27, 2016
16	16	"Two is Company..." "Let's start living with a mysterious trio" Transliteration: "Nazo no san'nin kurashi, hajimemasu! ?" (Japanese: 謎の三人暮らし、はじめます!?)	Yo Kawahara	Keiko Kanome	June 3, 2016
17	17	"A Modest Proposal" "Proposal? The future of the two" Transliteration: "Puropōzu! ? Futari no mirai" (Japanese: プロポーズ!? 二人の未来)	Yo Kawahara	Keiko Kanome	June 10, 2016

==== Season 2: Our Campus Days (2017) ====
No. overall	No. in season	Title	Directed by	Written by	Original release date
18	1	"Campus Life Is Full of Temptation"; Transliteration: "Kyanpasu raifu wa yūwaku-darake" (Japanese: キャンパスライフは誘惑だらけ)	Unknown	Rieko Obayashi	September 22, 2017
19	2	"Mission: Get More Girly" "Aim, increase female power!!" Transliteration: "Mezase, joshidjikara UP! !" (Japanese: 目指せ、女子力UP!!)	Unknown	Rieko Obayashi	September 22, 2017
20	3	"Love or Friendship?" "Love or friendship, that is the problem" Transliteration: "Koi ka yūjō ka, sore ga mondaida" (Japanese: 恋か友情か、それが問題だ)	Unknown	Unknown	September 22, 2017
21	4	"First Love Never Lasts" "I say my first love will not come true" Transliteration: "Hatsukoi wa kanawanai tte iukeredo" (Japanese: 初恋は叶わないって言うけれど)	Unknown	Rieko Obayashi	September 22, 2017
22	5	"Playing a Tragic Heroine Is Fun!" "I hate the tragic heroine !?"; Transliteration: "Higekinohiroin wa kiraijanai! ?" (Japanese: 悲劇のヒロインは嫌いじゃない!?)	Unknown	Yuna Suzuki	September 22, 2017
23	6	"His Birthday Surprise" "Surprise your birthday!" Transliteration: "Tanjōbi wa sapuraizu de!" (Japanese: 誕生日はサプライズで!)	Unknown	Unknown	September 22, 2017
24	7	"For Friendship" "Cheering flag is a friend's seal" Transliteration: "Ōenbata wa tomodachi no shirushi" (Japanese: 応援旗は友達の印)	Unknown	Unknown	September 22, 2017
25	8	"Careful When Camping at Night"; Transliteration: "Kyanpu no yoru ni hago chūi o" (Japanese: キャンプの夜にはご注意を)	Unknown	Unknown	September 22, 2017
26	9	"Can You Fall Out of Love?" "Does the feeling of love change?" Transliteration: "Koisurukimochi tte kawaru mono?" (Japanese: 恋する気持ちって変わるもの?)	Unknown	Unknown	September 22, 2017
27	10	"Give Me a Good Morning Call Tomorrow" "Good morning call tomorrow" Transliteration: "Ashita mo guddomōningu kōru" (Japanese: 明日もグッドモーニング・コール)	Unknown	Unknown	September 22, 2017
