= Dori Sakurada =

Japanese actor and singer (born 1991)

- 桜田 通
- Born: December 7, 1991 (age 34); Tokyo, Japan
- Occupations: Actor; singer; dancer; model
- Years active: 2005–present
- Agent: Amuse
- Height: 180 cm (5 ft 11 in)
- Website: Sakurada Dori

Dori Sakurada (Japanese: 桜田 通, Hepburn: Sakurada Dōri; born December 7, 1991) is a Japanese actor and singer. He is best known for his role as Ryoma Echizen as part of the third generation Seigaku cast in The Prince of Tennis musicals, Tenimyu, and also for the role of Suguru Niragi in Netflix's survival drama Alice in Borderland.

== Career ==
Sakurada was born in December 7, 1991, in Tokyo, Japan. At age 11, while walking home with his mother, he was scouted and soon joined his current company, Amuse. He took singing, dancing and acting lessons while attending middle and high school. In 2005, he was chosen to play the lead protagonist Ryoma Echizen in a musical adapted from the popular anime The Prince of Tennis, Tenimyu. The decision generated a buzz, as at the age of 14, he was the youngest member to be cast. In the same year, he made his acting debut when he appeared in one episode of the TV drama, Ruri's Island. After his two year run as Ryoma Echizen, he got his big break in 2008 when he starred as Kotaro Nogami in Saraba Kamen Rider Den-O: Final Countdown, the third film adaptation of the popular Kamen Rider Series. The film was a success, ranking second on its opening week and earning a total of ¥720 million in the Japanese box office.

In 2013, went on hiatus to study in London, England. In a 2019 interview, he revealed that the decision came from the want to explore other career options, as he was slowly losing the passion and motivation, the path of acting not being his choice in the first place. However, he returned to Japan in just 6 months. He admitted his time away immediately changed his attitude towards work, renewed his hunger to succeed in the entertainment industry and that this time, it was his choice to be an actor. Since then, he has appeared in films such as Orange (2015) and Let Me Eat Your Panceas (2017), and in TV shows such as Scum's Wish (2017), Coffee & Vanilla (2019) and Alice in Borderland (2020).

Apart from acting, he writes and produces his own music, releasing his first EP, Sakura da Festa Best, in 2019. He performs live in his yearly fan event, Sakura da Festa, the first one held in 2016.

In 2020, he established his official fanclub, the Sakura da Space Society.

In 2022, he completed his first Zepp tour. Named Dori Sakurada ZEPP TOUR 2022: Anniversary to the next level, he performed in Tokyo, Osaka, Nagoya and Yokohama.

== Personal life ==
Named after Sakurada-dori Avenue in Tokyo, Dori has an older brother, older sister, and a younger sister. He attended Meguro Nihon University High School, where he often played tennis and basketball. In 2002, the same year he was scouted, he got a Dachshund which he named Fanta. After his pet's death in 2019, he centered his fanclub website theme and design around Fanta, along with his interest in outer space.

His favorite musician is the Japanese rock band, UVERworld. After meeting the band's lead vocalist TAKUYA∞ in one of his singing lessons, he became a fan, immediately buying all of their CDs on his way home. Since then, they've become close friends, with Dori often seen wearing a gold ring that was gifted to him by Takuya∞ for his 18th birthday, and UVERworld providing the theme song for Dori's 2014 movie, Marching: Ashita e.

He is close friends with Kento Yamazaki. The duo met on the set of Baseball Brainiacs (2014), and have worked in multiple movies and shows since. In the variety program The World's Ashtonishing News!, Kento revealed that him, Dori and both their mothers celebrated New Year's Day 2020 by going on a trip to Hakone, Japan. He is also close friends with former Amuse artists Takeru Satoh and Ryunosuke Kamiki.

== Stages and musicals ==
Year	Title	Role	Venue/Dates	Notes	Ref(s)
2006	Tenimyu: The Prince of Tennis Musical: Advancement Match Rokkaka feat. Hyotei Gekuen	Ryoma Echizen	Nippon Seinen-kan Hall, Tokyo (August 3-13) Osaka Mielparque Hall, Osaka (August 16-19) Meitetsu Hall, Nagoya (August 24-27)	Debut of the 3rd Seigaku Cast	
2006-2007	Tenimyu: The Prince of Tennis Musical: Absolute King Rikkai feat. Rokkaku ~ First Service	Ryoma Echizen	Nippon Seinen-kan Hall, Tokyo (December 13-25) Osaka Mielparque Hall, Osaka (December 28 - January 8) Kagawa-ken Kenmin Hall, Kagawa (January 11-14) Sunshine Theatre, Tokyo (January 18-21) Nagoya Shinmin Kaikan-chuu Hall, Nagoya (January 25-27)		
2007	Frogs	Kakeru	Green Theatre, Tokyo (March 14-21)		
2007	Tenimyu: The Prince of Tennis Musical: Dream Live 4th	Ryoma Echizen	Pacifico Yokohama, Yokohama (March 30-31) Umeda Arts Theater (May 17-20)		
2007	Online 2: Roomshare	Nobutoshi Oyama	Zenrosai Hall Space Zero, Tokyo (May 2-6)		
2007	Tenimyu: The Prince of Tennis Musical: Absolute King Rikkai feat. Rokkaku ~ Second Service	Ryoma Echizen	Nippon Seinen-kan Hall, Tokyo (August 2-15) Osaka Mielparque Hall, Osaka (August 18-25) Kagawa-ken Kenmin Hall, Kagawa (August 28-29) Fukuoka Shimin Kaikan Dai Hall, Fukuoka (September 1-2)		
2007	Frogs: Replay	Kakeru	Tokyo Metropolitan Theatre Centre Hall (September 9, 21)		
2008	Frogs: Replay	Kakeru	Tennozu Galaxy Theater, Shinawaga (March 19- 23) Umeda Arts Theater, Osaka (March 28-30)		
2010	Tenimyu: The Prince of Tennis Musical: Dream Live 7th	Ryoma Echizen	World Memorial Hall, Kobe (May 7-9) Yokohama Arena, Yokohama (May 20-23)	Guest Appearance	
2010	Black & White	Shiro	Sunshine Theater, Tokyo (August 8 - September 28)		
2011	Pinocchio	Yamaneko	Shibuya Cultural Center Owada, Tokyo (August 12-22) Theater Brava!, Osaka (August 25-28)		
2011	Mystic Topaz	Phantom Thief "Michelle"	Theater Sun Mall, Tokyo (October 1-16)		
2015	Rock ☆ Opera "Psychedelic Pain"	Kaito	Tennozu Galaxy Theater, Shinagawa (April 4-12) Canal City Theater, Fukuoka (April 17-19) Umeda Arts Theater, Osaka (April 30 - May 4)		

== Filmography ==
=== Television ===
Year	Title	Role	Network	Notes	Ref(s)
2005	Ruri's Island	Teppei Tsuchiya	NTV	Guest (episode 4)	
2008	Tokyo Girl: Elena Mizusawa ~Kimi no Uta	Keita Honda	TBS	Guest (episodes 1 & 2)	
2008	Hobaken: Case Files of a Rookie Lawyer	Takeshi Fuda	NTV	Guest (episodes 5 & 6)	
2009	Kamen Rider Decade	Kotaro Nogami	TV Asahi	Guest (episode 15)	
2009	Samurai High School	Satoshi Ikeyama	NTV		
2009	Handsome Shirayuri Brother's Dining Table	Shizuru Shirayuri	QTV	Lead role	
2010	Arienai!	Junichi Kanō	MBS	Guest (episode 11)	
2010	853: Detective Kamo Shinnosuke	Shinichi Akamatsu	TV Asahi	Guest (episode 8)	
2010	General Rouge no Gaisen	Kento Yamazaki	Fuji TV	Guest (episode 6)	
2010	Clone Baby	Eita Tsubaki	TBS	Guest (episodes 1–3)	
2011	Koi Choco: Bittersweet Angel	Andō Anju	TBS	Lead role	
2011	Sign	Yorimitsu Mizumoto	MBS	Lead role	
2011	Misaki Number One!!	Takumi Kashiwabara	NTV	Guest (episode 8)	
2012	Sūgaku Joshi Gakuen	Kazuki Sato	NTV	Lead role	
2012	Shiritsu Bakaleya Koukou	Makoto Okamoto	NTV	Guest (episode 6)	
2014	Koibumi Biyori	Mitsuo Yuki	NTV	Guest (episode 3)	
2014	Baseball Brainiacs	Eisuke Shikata	NTV		
2014	Rikei No Hitobito	Adachi	TBS		
2015	Atelier	Sōsuke Himeji	Fuji TV		
2016	Hatsukoi Geinin	Yuta Sudo	NHK		
2016	Otoko to Onna no Mystery Jidaigeki	Seitaro	BS TV	Guest (episode 6)	
2016	Koe Koi (Voice Love)	Ryoichi Sejima	TV Tokyo		
2016	Hope: Kitai Zero no Shinnyu Shain	Keita Niimura	Fuji TV		
2016	Love Love Alien	Akira Nogami	Fuji TV		
2016	Onnatachi no Tokusou Saizensen	Ryohei Yanagisawa	TV Asahi	Guest (episode 4)	
2016-2018	Good Morning Call	Daichi Shinozaki	Fuji TV/ Netflix	2 seasons	
2017	Scum's Wish	Mugi Awaya	Fuji TV	Lead role	
2017	The Courage to be Disliked	Takatoshi Miyake	Fuji TV		
2017	Maji de Kōkai Shitemasu	Yamato Yagi	TBS/ MBS	Lead role	
2017	CSI: Crime Scene Talks Season 4	Jun Konuma	TV Asahi	Guest (episode 7)	
2017	Aishite tatte, Himitsu wa Aru (My Lover's Secret)	Tomoya Oikawa	NTV	Guest (episode 1)	
2017	Sannin no Papa (Three Dads)	Ryosuke Nishikawa	TBS	Guest (episode 6)	
2017	Keishicho Ikimono Gakari (MPD: Animal Unit)	Natsuo Noma	Fuji TV	Guest (episode 6)	
2018	Seven Detectives: Season 4	Shinji Asakura	TV Asahi	Guest (episode 3)	
2018	Road to Eden	Kenji	Fuji TV		
2018	Hana Nochi Hare: Hanadan Next Season	Toru Aoyama	TBS	Guest (episodes 9–11)	
2019	Perfect Crime	Haruto Shinonome	TV Asahi	Lead role	
2019	Coffee & Vanilla	Hiroto Fukami	TV Asahi	Lead role	
2019	Watashi, Teiji de Kaerimasu (I Will Not Work Overtime, Period)	Taneda Hiiragi/Shu	TBS		
2020	Guilty: Kono Koi wa Tsumi Desu ka	Naomichi Moriya	NTV	Guest (episodes 8 & 9)	
2020	Detective Novice	Shiraki	NTV	Guest (episode 5)	
2020–2022	Alice in Borderland	Niragi Suguru	Netflix	2 seasons	
2021	3B no Koibito (The 3Bs You Shouldn't Date)	Seichi Minami/Yoshi	TV Asahi	Lead role	
2021	The Naked Director 2	Ken Hojo	Netflix	Guest (episode 2)	
2022	Serial Drama W: Identity	Ashikaga Kiyoshi	WOWOW	Guest (episode 3 & 4)	
2022	Chimudondon	Young Kento Higa	NHK	Guest (Episode 73 & 74)	
2022	Fukumen D (Masked D)	Masa	Abema TV		
2023	Play It Cool, Guys	Takayuki Mima	TV Tokyo	Lead Role	
2026	Doraemon	Konrobo	TV Asahi	Guest (Episode 930)	

=== Films ===
Year	Title	Role	Notes	Ref(s)
2007	Ashita no Watashi no Tsukurikata (How to Become Myself)	Jun Kanai		
2008	Aquarian Age: Juvenile Orion	Kaname Kusakabe	Lead role	
2008	Frogs on screen	Kakeru	Lead role	
2008	Farewell, Kamen Rider Den-O: Final Countdown	Kotaro Nogami/Kamen Rider NEW Den-O	Lead role	
2009	Cho Kamen Rider Den-O & Decade Neo Generations: The Onigashima Warship	Kotaro Nogami/Kamen Rider NEW Den-O	Lead role	
2009	Cafe Daikanyama III: Sorezore no Ashita	Kotohisa Miura		
2009	Umi no Ue no Kimi wa, Itsumo Egao	Riku Kobayakawa	Lead role	
2010	Shokudo Katatsumuri (Rinco's Restaurant)	Satoru		
2010	Beck	Masaru Hyodo		
2010	Kamen Rider × Kamen Rider × Kamen Rider The Movie: Cho-Den-O Trilogy – Episode Blue	Kotaro Nogami/Kamen Rider NEW Den-O	Lead role	
2011	Ōsama Game (King's Game)	Nobuaki Kanazawa	Lead role	
2011	OOO, Den-O, All Riders: Let's Go Kamen Riders	Kotaro Nogami/Kamen Rider NEW Den-O	Lead role	
2014	Marching: Ashita e	Tadanobu Son	Lead role	
2014	The Werewolf Game: The Beast Side	Yukihiko Todo		
2014	Gajimaru Shokudo no Koi (Gajimaru Restaurant's Love)	Shota Shimabukuro	Lead role	
2014	As the Gods Will	Class President	Cameo	
2015	Orange	Saku Hagita		
2016	Shûkatsu		Lead role	
2016	Zenin, Kataomoi: Boku no Sabotin (My cactus)	Toru Kinoshita	Lead role in segment	
2017	Let Me Eat Your Pancreas	Chairman Takahiro		
2018	Baachan Rodo (Walking with My Grandma)	Tetsuya Shoji		
2018	Even: Kimi ni Okuru Uta	Takehito	Lead role	
2019	Science Fell in Love, So I Tried to Prove It	Yu Kannagi		
2019	Back Street Girls: Gokudols	Seiji Koizumi		
2019	La	Shinpei Okahama	Lead role	
2022	Grown-ups	Masato		
2023	We're Broke, My Lord!	Matsudaira Kisaburō		

=== Music Video Appearances ===
- Winter Love Story – Jyongri (2008)
- Ame ni Utaeba – monobright (2010)
- Gingham Check – AKB48 (2012)
- I Still Love You – Lisa Halim (2012)
- Tsubasa wa Iranai – AKB48 (2016)
- Aoi Signal - Magic of Life (2016)
- Kumu wo Nuketa Aozora - Da-iCE (2019)

=== Animation ===
- Scum's Wish (Fuji TV, 2017) as Ori Kurada

== Discography ==
=== Extended Plays ===
Release date	Title	Details	Track list	Notes	Ref(s)
May 30, 2018	Even: A Song for You (Complete Edition) - EP	Label: Universal Music Format: CD, CD+DVD (Limited first press edition), Digital Download, Streaming	1. アイノウタ (Aino Uta); 2. フェロウ (Fellow); 3. Sabishiku Narujyan; 4. 会いたい (Aitai); 5. Carry on!	Released under the band name "Even", from the 2018 movie Even: Kimi ni Okuru Uta	
February 22, 2019	Sakura da Festa Best - EP	Label: Amuse Format: Digital Download, Streaming	1. きっと今日より (Kitto Kyouyori); 2. 涙Realize (Namida Realize); 3. NOISE; 4. FICTION; 5. 限りある日々(Kagiri Aru Hibi); 6. それでいい (Soredeii)		

=== Singles ===
Release date	Title	Details	Notes	Ref(s)
March 20, 2019	から新曲 (Seize the Day)	Label: Amuse Format: Digital Download, Streaming		
February 28, 2020	Don't step on me	Label: Amuse Format: Digital Download, Streaming		
February 28, 2020	あの空へ (Anosorahe)	Label: Amuse Format: Digital Download, Streaming		
February 28, 2020	Kodou	Label: Amuse Format: Digital Download, Streaming	From the 2019 film "La"	
March 3, 2020	Kibounorizumu	Label: Amuse Format: Digital Download, Streaming	From the 2019 film "La"	
October 4, 2021	One Word	Label: Amuse Format: Digital Download, Streaming		

=== Other participating works ===
Release date	Title	Details	Notes	Ref(s)
December 16, 2006	The Prince of Tennis Musical: Best Actors Series 005 (Dori Sakurada as Ryoma Echizen) - Album	Label: FEEL MEE/ TY Entertainment Inc. Format: CD	10 tracks	
April 22, 2009	超 Climax Jump (Super Climax Jump) - Single	Label: Avex Trax Format: -	The theme song recorded by the "Den-O All Stars" for the movie Cho Kamen Rider Den-O & Decade Neo Generations: The Onigashima Warship	
June 9, 2010	Double-Action Strike Form - Single/EP	Label: Avex Trax Format: CD	The ending theme song from Kamen Rider Den-O	
March 3, 2011	Sign - Single	Label: Amuse Format: CD/ DVD	The theme song from the 2011 TV drama, Sign	

== Bibliography ==
=== Photobooks ===
- 20th Anniversary limited edition Doriblog (November 2011, Amuse)
- Dori Sakurada first photo book "Sakurada" (June 2014, Wani Books) ISBN 978-4-8470-4650-6
- Sakura da Festa 2016～Music for my friends～ CD&Photobook (July 2016, Amuse)
- "Shiro to Ito" Photobook collaboration (August 2016, Amuse)
- Sakura da Festa 2017 ~Wonderful Encounter~ CD & Photobook (July 2017, Amuse)
- Sakura da Festa Birthday Tour CD & Photobook (June 2018, Amuse)
- Good Rocks! Vol. 102 (August 2019, Amuse) ISBN 978-4-401-76270-5
- Dori Sakurada second photo book "The 27 Club" (December 2019, Amuse) ISBN 978-4-909852-04-5
- Dori Sakurada Zepp Tour 2022 "Anniversary to the next level" Live Blu-ray & Photobook (July 2022, Amuse)

== CM ==
- P&G "Lumines" (2006)
- Uniqlo "Christmas for that person: Print fleece" (2007)
- Fujifilm "Fujicolor: New Year's postcard ~Mr. Okubo's hobby" (2013)
- Sankei Shimbun "Sankei Express" (2013)
- Tokyo One Piece Tower "Point of View" (2015)
- WonderPlanet's Crash Fever "Disgusting Boss: Read Through" (2016)
- WonderPlanet's Crash Fever "Disgusting Boss: Nyan Nyan" (2016)
- Danone Japan Oikos Greek yoghurt "Jaw Kui" (2017)
- Isehan "Heroine Make Volume Control Mascara" (2018)
- Adidas "Training Athletic 2020SS" (2020)
- Pokémon "Family Pokémon card game: Sword and Shield" (2021)
- Pokémon "Family Pokémon card game: Start Deck 100" (2021)
- Yves Rocher "Au Fresh Fragrance: My Vanilla Garden" (2021)
- Smooth Skin "Smooth Skin Bare Smart" (2021)
