= Yowakutemo Katemasu =

- Also known as: Yowakutemo Katemasu: Aoshi Sensei to Heppoko Kōkō Kyūji no Yabō
- Genre: Drama
- Written by: Yutaka Kuramochi; Nonji Nemoto
- Directed by: Shintarō Sugawara; Kenji Ikeda; Hiroto Akashi
- Starring: Kazunari Ninomiya; Kumiko Asō; Kasumi Arimura; Hiroko Yakushimaru
- Ending theme: "Guts!" by Arashi
- Country of origin: Japan
- Original language: Japanese
- No. of series: 1
- No. of episodes: 11

Production
- Producers: Hidehiro Kōno; Hiroko Ōkura
- Running time: 54 minutes

Original release
- Network: NTV
- Release: April 12 – June 21, 2014

Yowakutemo Katemasu: Aoshi Sensei to Heppoko Kōkō Kyūji no Yabō (弱くても勝てます〜青志先生とへっぽこ高校球児の野望〜; English title Baseball Brainiacs) is a Japanese television drama series based on the non-fiction novel by Hidemine Takahashi.

Kazunari Ninomiya, who is a member of the idol group Arashi, played the lead role. Kasumi Arimura played a supporting role as a manager for the High School Baseball Team. It premiered on NTV on 12 April 2014, and received the viewership rating of 9.9% on average.

== Cast ==
- Kazunari Ninomiya as Aoshi Tamo, a high school teacher
- Kumiko Asō as Riko Tone, sports magazine writer
- Kasumi Arimura as Yuzuko Tarumi, a manager of the baseball team
- Hiroko Yakushimaru as Kaede Tarumi, Yuzuko's mother
- Sota Fukushi as Kimiyasu Akaiwa, a baseball team member
- Yuto Nakajima as Tsuyoshi Shirao, a baseball team member
- Kento Yamazaki as Kōki Ebato, a baseball team's captain
- Kanata Hongō as Shunichi Kamezawa, a baseball team member
- Katsuhiro Suzuki as Masami Kashiyama, a baseball team member
- Ichikawa Ebizō XI as Kentarō Yachida, a former member of the baseball team
- Dori Sakurada as Eisuke Shikata, a baseball team member

== Episodes ==
No.	Title	Directed by	Original release date	Viewers (%)
1	"変人!? 教師の野望"	Shintarō Sugawara	April 12, 2014	13.4%
2	"実話原作ドラマ化! 先生走る! 秀才へっぽこ野球部にイジメと切ない初恋"	Shintarō Sugawara	April 19, 2014	11.7%
3	"亡き父に誓った母娘の野望! 女で上等よ!! 学費滞納の貧乏部員を救い出せ"	Kenji Ikeda	April 26, 2014	9.4%
4	"実話原作ドラマ化! ついに発見! 秀才弱小野球部が弱いまま勝つセオリー"	Shintarō Sugawara	May 3, 2014	7.6%
5	"初試合! 守備を捨て(秘) ドサクサ打法爆発! 苦学生の大決断と恋の三角関係"	Kenji Ikeda	May 10, 2014	11.9%
6	"さよならホームラン涙の最終打席…野球部が旅立つ友へ贈る別れの文化祭"	Shintarō Sugawara	May 17, 2014	10.4%
7	"強化合宿! 男だらけでケンカ続出! (秘)打法で東大にも兄弟喧嘩も恋も勝て!"	Kenji Ikeda	May 24, 2014	9.9%
8	"不祥事!!"	Hiroto Akashi	May 31, 2014	8.5%
9	"甲子園予選1回戦! 勝てる確率は1.9%なるか!? 弱い奴らの涙の初勝利"	Shintarō Sugawara	June 7, 2014	7.4%
10	"へっぽこ野球部に最高の監督あり! 超弱小校が強豪校に勝つ!? 涙のラストへ"	Kenji Ikeda	June 14, 2014	8.4%
11	"卒業…二宮和也、涙の15分間のラストメッセージ!! 失敗を恐れず思いきり振り切れ!!"	Shintarō Sugawara	June 21, 2014	8.9%

Preceded by Senryokugai Sōsakan (11 January 2014 - 15 March 2014)	NTV Saturday Dramas; Saturdays 21:00 - 21:54 (JST)	Succeeded by Kindaichi Shōnen no Jikenbo N (neo) (19 July 2014 - 27 September 2014)
