= Kiss me a lot (disambiguation) =

Kiss me a lot may refer to:

- excessive kissing
- "Kiss Me a Lot", 2015 song by Morrissey, a single from his 2015 album World Peace Is None of Your Business
- 'Kiss Me A Lot', an award winning horse, the 2015 National Reined Cow Horse Association Champion
- "Bésame Mucho", a 1932 Mexican song sometimes known as and released as and covered as "Kiss me a lot" in English

== See also ==
- Kiss Me (disambiguation)
- Bésame Mucho (disambiguation) (Spanish: kiss me a lot)
