= Coffee & Vanilla =

Japanese manga series

- Cover of the Japanese version of vol. 1, first released on October 26, 2015

コーヒー&バニラ (Kōhī Ando Banira)
- Genre: Romance
- Manga
- Written by: Takara Akegami
- Published by: Shogakukan
- Imprint: Flower Comics
- Magazine: Cheese!
- Original run: April 2015 – January 2024
- Volumes: 24
- Manga

Coffee & Vanilla: Black
- Published by: Shogakukan
- Imprint: Flower Comics
- Magazine: Premier Cheese!
- Original run: 2018 – present
- Volumes: 4
- Television drama
- Directed by: Smith; Keijirō Tsubakimoto; Hiroto Totsuka
- Written by: Yuko Shimoda; Sorami Date
- Original network: MBS TV
- Original run: July 5, 2019 – September 6, 2019
- Episodes: 10

Coffee & Vanilla (Japanese: コーヒー&バニラ, Hepburn: Kōhī Ando Banira) is a Japanese manga series by Takara Akegami. Coffee & Vanilla is serialized in the monthly josei manga magazine Cheese! from April 2015 to January 2024. In addition, a spin-off series titled Coffee & Vanilla Black ran in the digital monthly magazine Premier Cheese!! since 2018.

A live-action television drama adaptation ran from July 5 to September 6, 2019.

== Plot ==
Risa Shiragi is a popular student at her university known for her beauty, but she has a timid personality, which prevents her from entering relationships with others. One day, after Hiroto Fukami rescues her from a stalker, she becomes attracted to his mature personality and they begin dating. Throughout their relationship, Risa tries to match Fukami's maturity and hopes one day to become a suitable partner for him.

== Characters ==
Risa Shiragi (白城 リサ, Shiragi Risa)
Portrayed by Haruka Fukuhara (TV drama)
Risa is a 20-year-old college student who is popular among other students for her beauty, but is very shy in reality.
Hiroto Fukami (深見 宏斗, Fukami Hiroto)
Portrayed by Dori Sakurada (TV drama)
Fukami is the 32-year-old and the president of Fukami Holdings.
Takaaki Akutsu (阿久津 孝晃, Akutsu Takaaki)
Portrayed by Mario Kuroba (TV drama)
Akutsu is Fukami's rival and the president of Akutsu Corporation. He is popular with women.
Tsubasa Yoshiki (吉木 翼, Yoshiki Tsubasa)
Portrayed by Yuki Ogoe (TV drama)
Tusubasa is Risa's classmate. He is friendly and falls in love with Risa.
Natsuki Ashiya (芦屋 なつき, Ashiya Natsuki)
Portrayed by Noa Kita (TV drama)
Natsuki is Risa's childhood friend who later enters a friends-with-benefits relationship with Akutsu.
Yuki Ichiyanagi (市柳 雪, Ichiyanagi Yuki)
Portrayed by Shogo Hama (TV drama)
Yuki is Fukami's private secretary. He was Fukami's classmate when they were in high school.

== Media ==
=== Manga ===
Coffee & Vanilla is written and illustrated by Takara Akegami. It was serialized in the monthly josei manga magazine Cheese! since the June 2015 issue. It ended in the March 2024 issue on January 24, 2024. The chapters were later released in twenty-four tankōbon volumes released from October 26, 2015, to February 26, 2024, by Shogakukan under the Flower Comics imprint.

A spin-off series titled Coffee & Vanilla: Black, focusing on side characters Natsuki and Akutsu, began running concurrently in 2018 in the magazine Premier Cheese!. The spin-off's chapters have been collected in four volumes as of March 26, 2026.

==== Coffee & Vanilla ====
No.	Japanese release date	Japanese ISBN
1	October 26, 2015	978-4-09-137719-7
1. "Kiss & Night" (キス&ナイト, Kisu Ando Naito); 2. "Bitter & Call" (ビター&コール, Bitā Ando Kōru); 3. "First Sleepover & XXX" (初お泊り&xxx, Hatsu Otomari Ando XXX); 4. "First Date & Esper" (初デート&エスパー, Hatsu Dēto Ando Esupā); 5. "Campus & Jealousy" (キャンパス&ジェラシー, Kyanpasu Ando Jerashī)
2	February 26, 2016	978-4-09-138299-3
6. "Rival & Punishment" (ライバル&パニッシュメント, Raibaru Ando Panisshumento); 7. "Courage & Excuse" (カレッジ&エクスキューズ, Karejji Ando Ekusukyūzu); 8. "Virgin & Encounter" (バッジョン&エンカウンター, Bajjon Ando Enkauntā); 9. "Heat & Competition" (ヒート&コンペティション, Hīto Ando Konpetishon); "Side Story" (番外編, Bangai-hen)
3	June 24, 2016	978-4-09-138454-6
10. "Enemy & Guardian" (エネミー&ガーディアン, Enemī Ando Gadian) 10.5. "Talk & Secretary" (トーク&セクレタリー, Tōku Ando Sekuretarī); 11. "Revenge & Reward" (リベンジ&リワード, Ribenji Ando Riwādo); 12. "Honey & Return" (ハニー&リターン, Hanī Ando Ritān); 13. "Play & Game" (プレイ&ゲーム, Purei Ando Gēmu); Extra Episode
4	November 10, 2016	978-4-09-138778-3
14. "Home & Accident" (ホーム&アクシデント, Hōmu Ando Akushidento) 14.5. "Talk & Secretary" (トーク&セクレタリー, Tōku Ando Sekuretarī); 15. "Date & Friend" (デート&フレンド, Dēto Ando Furendo); 16. "Winner & Loser" (ウイナー&ルーザー, Uinā Ando Rūzā); 17. "Hope & Birthday" (ホープ&バースデー, Hōpu Ando Bāsudē); "Side Story" (番外編, Bangai-hen)
5	February 24, 2017	978-4-09-139135-3
18. "Lonely & Desire" (ロンリー&デザイア, Rōnrī Ando Dezaia); 19. "Protect & Love" (プロテクト&ラブ, Purotekuto Ando Rabu); 20. "Sweet & Home" (スイート&ホーム, Suīto Ando Hōmu); 21. "Heart & Life" (ハート&ライフ, Hāto Ando Raifu); Extra Episode Side: N
6	June 26, 2017	978-4-09-139182-7
22. "Like & Love" (ライク&ラブ, Raiku Ando Rabu); 23. "Memories & Regret" (メモリーズ&レグレット, Memorīzu Ando Reguretto); 24. "Trial & Virgin" (トライアル&バッジョン, Toraiaru Ando Bajjon); 25. "Engage & Wish" (エンゲージ&ウイッシュ, Engēji Ando Uisshu); "Side Story" (番外編, Bangai-hen)
7	October 27, 2017	978-4-09-139680-8
26. "Secretary & Request" (セクレタリー&リクエスト, Sekuretarī Ando Rikuesto); 27. "Secretary & Answer" (セクレタリー&アンサー, Sekuretarī Ando Ansā); 28. "Friendship & Memories" (フレンドシップ&メモリーズ, Furendoshippu Ando Memorīzu); 29. "Sick & Childhood" (シック&チャイルドフッド, Shikku Ando Chairudofuddo); "Side Story" (番外編, Bangai-hen)
8	February 26, 2018	978-4-09-139876-5
30. "Sweet & Bitter" (スイート&ビター, Suīto Ando Bitā); 31. "Doubt & Darkness" (ダウト&ダークネス, Dauto Ando Dākunesu); 32. "Host & Scheme" (ホスト&スキーム, Hosuto Ando Sukīmu); 33. "Mother & Son" (マザー&サン, Mazā Ando San); "Side Story" (番外編, Bangai-hen)
9	June 26, 2018	978-4-09-870078-3
34. "Diet & Treat" (ダイエット&トリート, Daietto Ando Torīto); 35. "Cousin & Confuse" (カズン&コンフューズ, Kazun Ando Konfyūzu); 36. "Triangle & Thrill" (トライアングル&スリル, Toraianguru Ando Suriru); 37. "Wine & Cherry Blossom" (ワイン&チェリーブロッサム, Wain Ando Cherī Burossamu); Extra Episode Side: N
10	October 26, 2018	978-4-09-870253-4
38. "Secretary & Danger" (セクレタリー&デンジャー, Sekuretarī Ando Denjā); 39. "Risk & Protect" (リスク&プロテクト, Risuku Ando Purotekuto); 40. "Separate & Repair" (セパレート&リペア, Separēto Ando Ripea); 41. "Precious & Promise" (プレシャス&プロミス, Pureshasu Ando Puromisu); "Side Story" (番外編, Bangai-hen)
11	February 26, 2019	978-4-09-870392-0
42. "Love & Friendship" (ラブ&フレンドシップ, Rabu Ando Furendoshippu); 43. "Lesson & Reward" (レッスン&リワード, Ressun Ando Riwādo); 44. "Dress & Jealous" (ドレス&ジェラス, Doresu Ando Jerasu); 45. "Truth & Confess" (トゥルース&コンフェス, Turusu Ando Konfesu); "Special Story" (特別編, Tokubetsu-hen)
12	June 26, 2019	978-4-09-870489-7
46. "Fake & Tease" (フェイク&ティーズ, Feiku Ando Tīzu); 47. "Liar & Penalty" (ライアー&ペナルティ, Raiā Ando Penaruti); 48. "Cat & Baby" (キャット&ベイビー, Kyatto Ando Beibī); 49. "Father & Home" (ファザー&ホーム, Fazā Ando Hōmu)
12.5	June 26, 2019	978-4-09-870535-1
13	September 26, 2019	978-4-09-870626-6
14	February 26, 2020	978-4-09-870799-7
15	June 26, 2020	978-4-09-871007-2
16	November 26, 2020	978-4-09-871204-5; 978-4-09-943075-7 (SE)
17	April 26, 2021	978-4-09-871253-3
18	August 26, 2021	978-4-09-871413-1
19	February 25, 2022	978-4-09-871575-6
20	August 26, 2022	978-4-09-871715-6; 978-4-09-943110-5 (SE)
21	December 26, 2022	978-4-09-871846-7
22	May 25, 2023	978-4-09-872139-9
23	November 24, 2023	978-4-09-872443-7
24	February 26, 2024	978-4-09-872545-8

==== Coffee & Vanilla: Black ====
No.	Japanese release date	Japanese ISBN
1	March 26, 2019	978-4-09-137719-7
1. "Cup 1" (1杯目, Ichi-paime); 2. "Cup 2" (2杯目, Ni-paime); 3. "Cup 3" (3杯目, San-paime); 4. "Cup 4" (4杯目, Yon-paime); "AM 8:00, The Truth is." (AM8:00、ほんとはね。, Gozen Hachi-ji, Honto wa ne.); "AM 8:00, The Truth is. (Afterwards)" (AM8:00、ほんとはね。～その後～, Gozen Hachi-ji, Honto wa ne.: Sono Ko)
2	March 26, 2020	978-4-09-870805-5
5. "Cup 5" (5杯目, Go-paime); 6. "Cup 6" (6杯目, Roppaime) 6.5. "Special"; 7. "Cup 7" (7杯目, Nanapaime); 8. "Cup 8" (8杯目, Happaime); "Side Story" (番外編, Bangai-hen); "Cute Aphrodisiac" (かわいい媚薬, Kawaii Biyaku)
3	December 26, 2022	978-4-09-871847-4
4	March 26, 2026	978-4-09-873336-1

=== Television drama ===
A live-action television series adaptation was announced in June 2019 and slated for release on July 4, 2019. The series stars Haruka Fukuhara as Risa, Dori Sakurada as Fukami, Mario Kuroba as Akutsu, Yuki Ogoe as Tsubasa, Noa Kita as Natsuki, and Shogo Hama as Yuki. The television series aired weekly on MBS TV at 1 AM as part of their Drama Tokku programming block, with other broadcasts on TV Kanagawa and Television Saitama. The opening theme song is "You & I" by Good on the Reel and the ending theme is "Melancholic" by Airi Miyakawa.

==== Episodes ====
No.	Title	Written by	Original release date
1	"Kiss & Night"; Transliteration: "Kisu Ando Naito" (Japanese: キス&ナイト)	Yuko Shimoda	July 5, 2019
2	"Courage & Jealousy"; Transliteration: "Karejji Ando Jerashī" (Japanese: カレッジ&ジェラシー)	Yuko Shimoda	July 12, 2019
3	"Enemy & Guardian"; Transliteration: "Enemī Ando Gadian" (Japanese: エネミー&ガーディアン)	Sorami Date	July 19, 2019
4	"Revenge & Reward"; Transliteration: "Ribenji Ando Riwādo" (Japanese: リベンジ&リワード)	Sorami Date	July 26, 2019
5	"Play & Game"; Transliteration: "Purei Ando Gēmu" (Japanese: プレイ&ゲーム)	Yuko Shimoda	August 2, 2019
6	"Battle & Crisis"; Transliteration: "Batoru Ando Kurashisu" (Japanese: バトル&クライシス)	Yuko Shimoda	August 9, 2019
7	"Sweet & Home"; Transliteration: "Suīto Ando Hōmu" (Japanese: スイート&ホーム)	Yuko Shimoda	August 16, 2019
8	"Host & Mother"; Transliteration: "Hosuto Ando Mazā" (Japanese: ホスト&マザー)	Sorami Date	August 23, 2019
9	"Risk & Danger"; Transliteration: "Risuku Ando Denjā" (Japanese: リスク&デンジャー)	Yuko Shimoda	August 30, 2019
10	"Coffee & Vanilla"; Transliteration: "Kōhī Ando Banira" (Japanese: コーヒー&バニラ)	Yuko Shimoda	September 6, 2019

== Reception ==
The series ranked #6 in the shojo and josei category on the digital book service BookLive! in the first half of 2019.

Volume 10 debuted at #12 on Oricon and sold 45,368 copies. Volume 11 debuted at #6 on Oricon and sold 70,155 copies.

By February 2024, the series had over 10 million copies in circulation.
