= Bésame mucho (1995 film) =

- Film poster
- Directed by: Philippe Toledano
- Starring: Amparo Grisales; Ruddy Rodríguez; Gustavo Rodríguez; Antonio Drija; Honorato Magaloni; Athenea Klioumí
- Release date: 1995
- Countries: Colombia; Mexico; Venezuela
- Language: Spanish

Bésame mucho is a dramatic film made by the association of producers and directors from Venezuela, Mexico and Colombia released in 1995, directed by Philippe Toledano with screenplay by Mariela Romero and Philippe Toledan. The film was the first co-production of this group, which would alternate between each country for the realization of such film productions. It features the leading role of Colombian actress Amparo Grisales, along with Venezuelan actors Gustavo Rodríguez, Ruddy Rodríguez, Athenea Klioumí and the acting debut of Antonio Drija; and the special participation of Mexican actor Honorato Magaloni.

== Plot ==
A skilled salesman seduces lonely and emotionally troubled women and then robs them. One day he finds refuge in the house of a woman who was recently abandoned by her lover, an unscrupulous politician. Despite being antagonistic, violence and abandonment bring them together little by little. At the same time, chaos and fear reign in the city because of a psychopathic criminal hunted by the police for a series of murders of single women. Once the authorities begin to follow the clues of this criminal, they begin to suspect the salesman who may be involved in them giving beginning to the siege of the lovers' house.

== Cast ==
- Amparo Grisales
- Ruddy Rodríguez
- Gustavo Rodríguez
- Antonio Drija
- Honorato Magaloni
- Athenea Klioumí

== Awards and nominations ==
=== Cartagena Film Festival ===
- 1995 India Gold Catalina at the 35th Festival (Colombia)

Category	Actress	Result
Best actress	Amparo Grisales	Won
