= Jun Amaki =

Japanese gravure idol (born 1995)

- 天木 じゅん
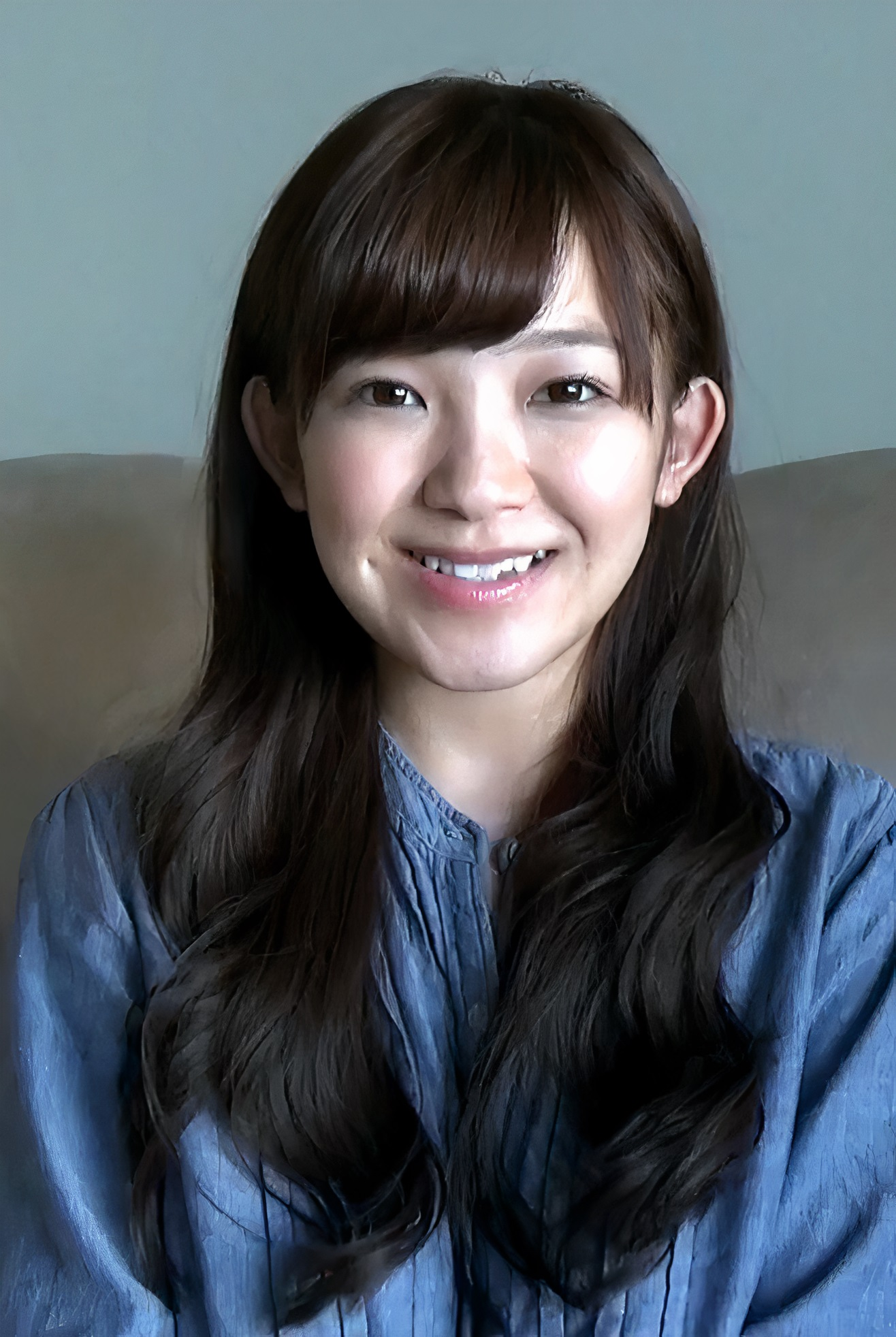
- Comments & Interview of 2nd DVD "天乳" by Jun Amaki
- Born: October 16, 1995 (age 31); Itami, Hyōgo
- Other name: Jun-chan
- Occupations: Actress; Gravure idol
- Years active: 2013–
- Agent: Watanabe Entertainment
- Style: Idol
- Height: 148 cm (4 ft 10 in)
- Spouse: Yuki Sasaki (m. 2026)
- Website: Official profile

Jun Amaki (天木 じゅん, Amaki Jun; born October 16, 1995, in Itami, Hyōgo) is a former Japanese gravure idol.

Amaki is represented by Watanabe Entertainment. She was formerly affiliated with Alice Project as a member of the Japanese J-pop idol groups Kamen Joshi and Armor Girls. Amaki's sister is Kamen Rider Girls' Ayako Kuroda.

In 2018, Amaki starred in two live action film adaptations of Kazuto Okada's Hop Step Jump! manga series.

== Personal life ==
On August 23, 2026, Amaki announced her marriage with a keirin cyclist Yuki Sasaki.

== Career ==
=== Photo albums ===
Date	Title	Publisher
21 Oct 2016	Nijigen Kanojo	Futabasha

=== Videos ===
Date	Title	Publisher	Medium
10 Jul 2015	Jun-chan desu!	E-Net Frontier	DVD/BD
29 Jul 2016	Amachichi	Liverpool	DVD
25 Nov 2016	Nijigen Kanojo	Futabasha	DVD

=== Films ===
Release date	Title	Director	Studio	Ref.
15 Dec 2018 (Theatrical) / 2 March 2019 (DVD)	Hop Step Jump!	Yousuke Toki	Odessa Entertainment	
16 Dec 2018 (Theatrical) / 2 March 2019 (DVD)	Hop Step Jump! 2	Yousuke Toki	Odessa Entertainment	

=== Variety shows ===
Run	Title	Network	Notes	Ref.
22 Oct 2015 – 1 Jul 2016	Yoso de Iwan to i-Tei: Koko dake no Hanashi ga Kikeru Maruhi Ryōtei	TX		
16 Dec 2016 –	Kayoko no Heya: Mayonaka no Game Kaigi	CX		
25 Apr 2017	360° Marumie! VR Idol Suiei Taikai	CX		
5 Apr 2017 – Jun 2017	Honnō Z	CBC	3rd Generation Talent Assistant	

=== Radio programmes ===
Run	Title	Network
16 Apr 2016 –	Ore-tachi Gocha maze'!: Atsumare Yan Yan	MBS Radio

=== Internet ===
Title	Website	Ref.
Wata@Ame	Ameba Fresh! studio	

=== Stage ===
Run	Title	Role	Location
16–20 Mar 2016	DMM.yell presents Butai Atsui zo! Nekotani!!	Kurara Onda	Shinagawa Prince Hotel Club eX

=== Video games ===
Title	Role
Elchronica	Taha

=== Magazines ===
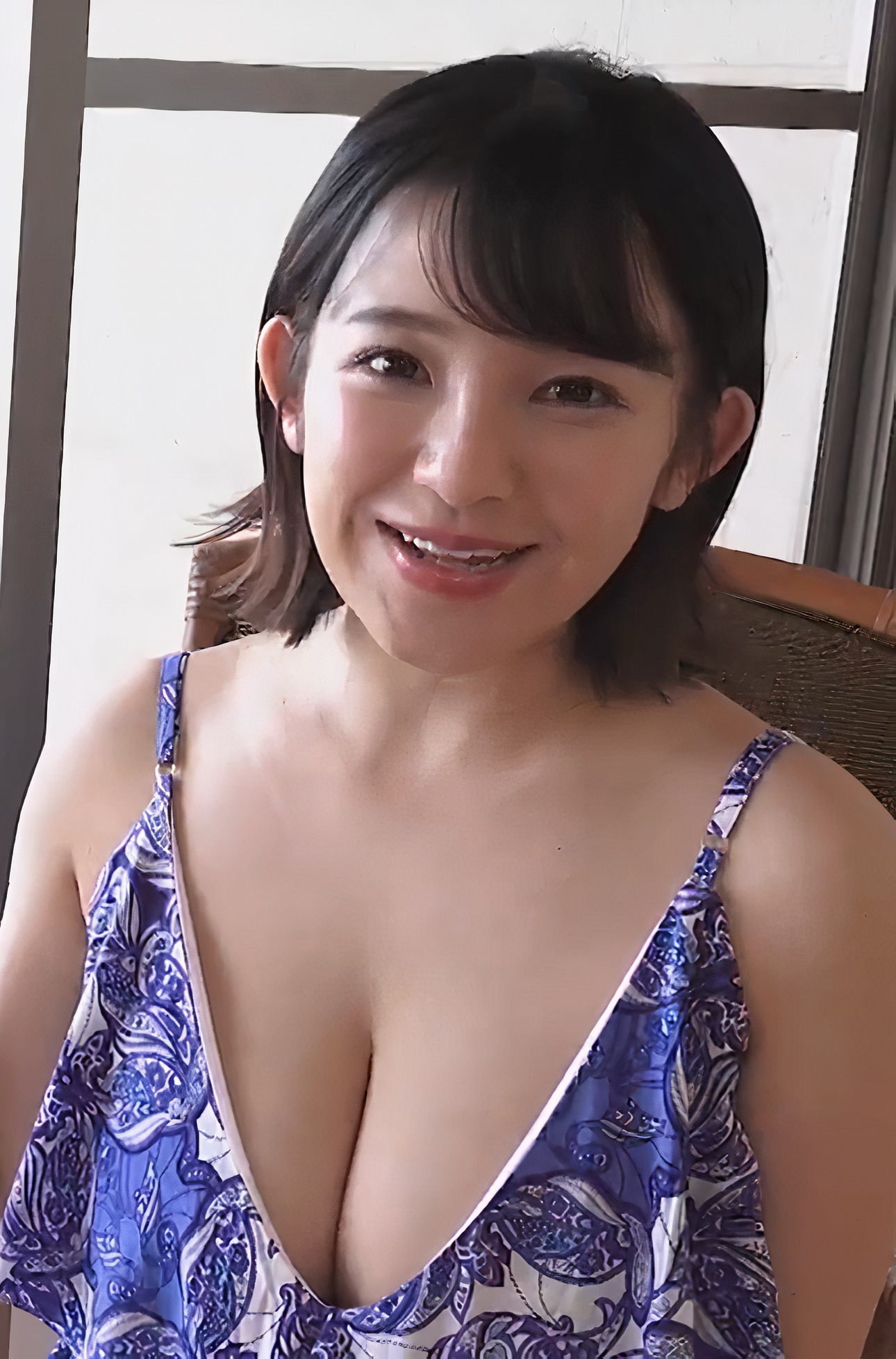
Jun Amaki

Run	Title	Ref.
2015 –	Young Animal	

=== Music group associations ===
- Poissan Iinkai
- Pā-ken!
- Machikado Keiki Kamen Joshi
- Armor Girls
- Kamen Joshi
- Idol Yōkai Kawayushi
- Pureful
