= Il bacio =

Il bacio (Italian for 'The Kiss') may refer to:

- Il bacio (1974 film), an Italian film directed by Mario Lanfranchi
- "Il bacio" (Arditi and Aldighieri), a 1860 song by composer Luigi Arditi and lyricist Gottardo Aldighieri
- Il bacio (Hayez), a 1859 painting by Francesco Hayez
