= Kiss Me (C. Jérôme song) =

"Kiss Me" is a 1972 hit song by the then unknown French pop singer C. Jérôme. The singer had reached 11 on the French charts in 1969 with an earlier single "Quand la mer se retire", but it was this his second single that went to No.1 in France.

Meeting by chance the singer Christophe (singer) in the studio while recording in January, the better known singer volunteered to add a harmonica to the chorus. Quickly licensed abroad, the song was released in 22 cover versions in multiple languages, in addition to licensing the original French version. So quick was the song's success throughout Europe and Latin America that C. Jérôme, real name Claude Dhotel, found himself famous in Germany and Austria under the name guessed by licensee Hansa International as "Charles Jérôme". Once known in German speaking countries as "Charles" Hansa persisted with the name Charles releasing later singles like 1974's "C'est Moi" under the wrong singer name. Not having any performing clothes and unable to buy them before the first royalties cheque, C. Jérôme also borrowed an old suit of Christophe's in which to appear on TV and in concert.
