= Kiss Me Kiss Me =

Kiss Me Kiss Me may refer to:

- "Kiss Me Kiss Me", single by Wilma De Angelis, written Danell, 1990, covered by Bruno Martino Orchestra 1991
- "Kiss Me Kiss Me", a 2014 promotional single by 5 Seconds of Summer

== See also ==
- Kiss Me, Kiss Me, Kiss Me, 1987 album by the Cure
- Kiss Me Kiss Me, Baby song by Japanese dance unit MAX . It is a Japanese cover of "Kiss me Kiss me, Babe" by the Italo disco group
