= Kiss Baking Company Limited =

Trinidadian food company

The Kiss Baking Company Limited is the leading Trinidadian firms that makes and markets packaged bakery goods. The company was founded in 1978. Kiss also acquired the rival company Coelho Baking Industries in 1989. It is located in Chaguanas, Trinidad and Tobago.

== Products ==
- Bread
- Wrap-a-daps
- Kiss Milk
- Kiss Raisin Bread
- Kiss Lemon Bread
- Vitaloaf
- Kiss Multigrain
- Kiss Whole wheat
- Hot Dog buns
- Hamburger buns
- Healthy Balance Sliced Bread
- Whole Wheat Hops Bread
- White Hops Bread
- Cakes
- Snack plain round
- Oval goodies
- Iced cup cakes
- Jelly filled cakes
- Corn muffins
- Brownies
- Single and Double Donuts.

The flavors of the cakes available are:

- Orange
- Chocolate
- Vanilla
- Strawberry

Additionally, the company makes customized cakes for special orders. Products are also exported to the other Caribbean islands, as well. Kiss has over one hundred vehicles distributing bread and cakes across Trinidad and Tobago. They enjoy a monopoly in Trinidad and Tobago having bought out their only serious competitor as mentioned above. The Company has also been guilty of inaccurate and misleading labelling of some of its products. Kiss' new products includes baked goods such as the artisan breads, almond slice cake, banana bread, glazed doughnuts, sweet bread and jelly filled cakes.
