= The Kiss (Ralli) =

Painting by Théodore Jacques Ralli

- Le Baiser (French)
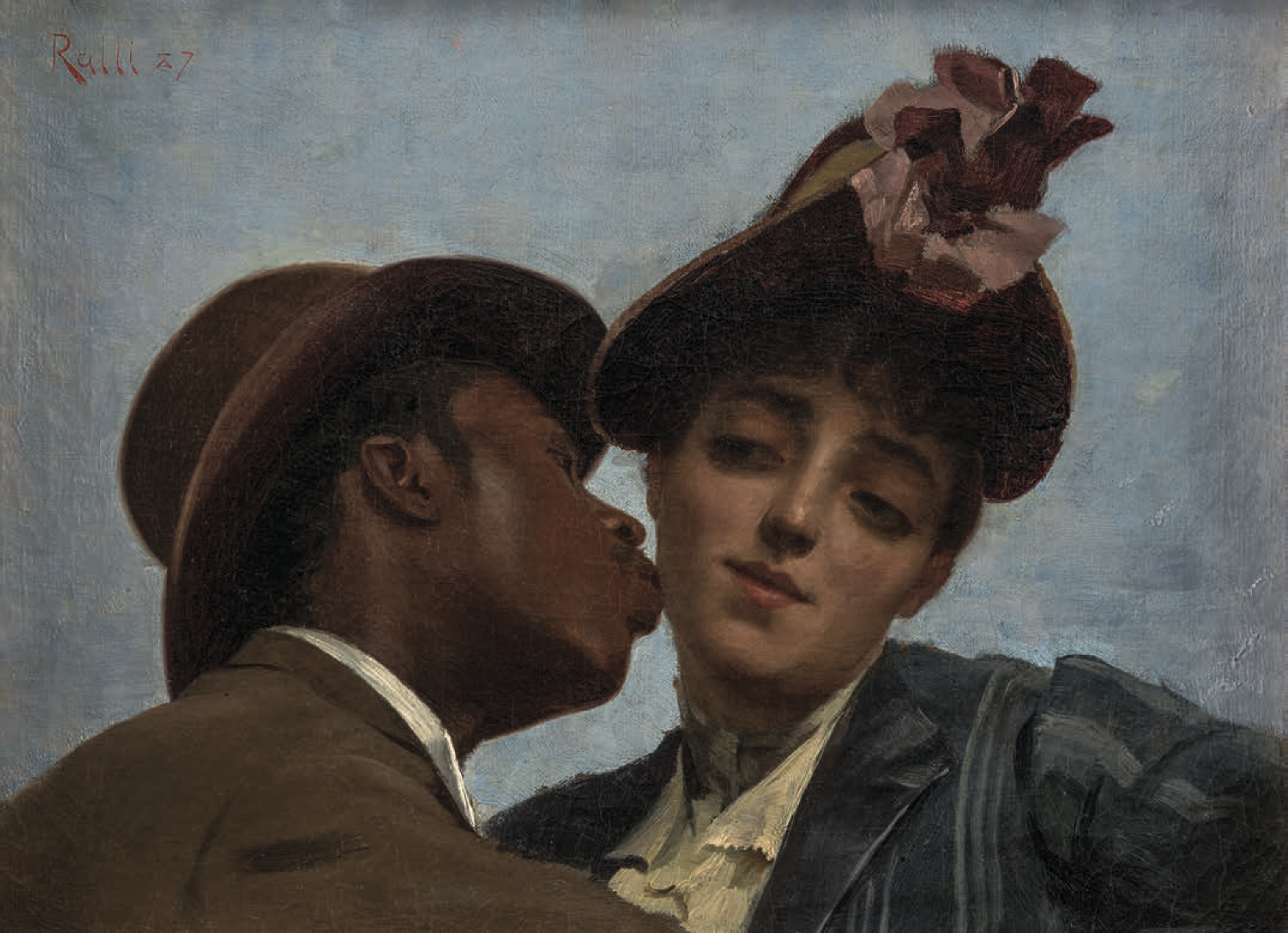
- Artist: Théodore Jacques Ralli
- Year: c. 1887
- Medium: Oil on canvas
- Movement: French School
- Subject: Man kissing woman
- Dimensions: 24.2 cm × 33 cm (9.5 ft in × 12.9 in)
- Owner: Private Collector

The Kiss is a painting created by Greek painter Theodorus Rallis. Rallis completed Orientalist, Academic, and Impressionist paintings. He was also known for his large output of paintings representing traditional Greek everyday life in the small villages of Greece. During the 1880s, the years leading up to the completion of The Kiss Rallis was honoured by King George I of Greece for his work and was awarded the Silver Cross of the Knights of the Royal Order of the Saviour. By 1886, the press summarised his productivity worldwide. Rallis exhibited works in America, Paris, Nice, London, Brussels, and Ghent.

== Background ==
Rallis completed a similar work to The Kiss with the same female sitter in 1887, entitled Woman in an Elegant Hat. The woman was dressed differently but maintained the same pose. From 1881 to 1887, Ralli's workshop was at 30 Rue Bremontier in Paris, France. By the end of his career, Rallis was known internationally and had completed hundreds of works.

During the late 1880s, electricity began to illuminate Paris. The Statue of Liberty was built in the city around the same period as the Eiffel Tower. Ralli's final Paris studio was located at 6 Rue Aumont-Thiéville starting in 1888. The art studios were designed and built by Gustave Eiffel, the same person who built the Eiffel Tower and the Statue of Liberty. Paris featured a bustling artistic scene, and fashionable hats were popular among women of the period. The period was known as the Late Bustle Era, and toque hats were fashionable. Several artists of the era featured toque hats in their works. British painter John William Waterhouse, active in London, featured the toque hat in the portrait of his wife Esther Kenworthy Waterhouse. French painter Virginie Demont-Breton features a toque hat in her painting Portrait of Marie Duhem, and Polish painter Anna Bilińska, active in Paris during the same period, features a woman donning a toque in her painting Portrait of a Lady with Opera Glasses. Each painting was completed between 1885 and 1889. It is difficult to ascertain if the work was completed in Paris or London because the artist also had a London address in 1887 at 36 Mornington Crescent.

The Kiss is currently in the hands of a private collector and was last sold by Christie's on October 25, 1996, for 23,000 dollars.

== Description ==
The work of art is oil on canvas. It was completed in 1887, and the height is 24.2 cm (9.5 in and the width is 33 cm (12.9 in). It depicts a Negro man kissing a Caucasian woman: such an interracial interaction in the late 1800s was illegal in the United States but acceptable in Paris. The work follows academicism. The painter's attention to bone structure, anatomical figures, and emotional expressions is deeply rooted in academism, in contrast to Ralli's impressionist works. The young female is dressed in elegant formal attire, while the young man wears a bowler hat and a lounge suit common to the working middle class. The female sitters' bodice is a high collar chemisette while her hat is a decorated toque. The young man kisses her neck while she reacts with a gentle gaze. The work was signed and dated by Ralli in 1887.

== Gallery ==
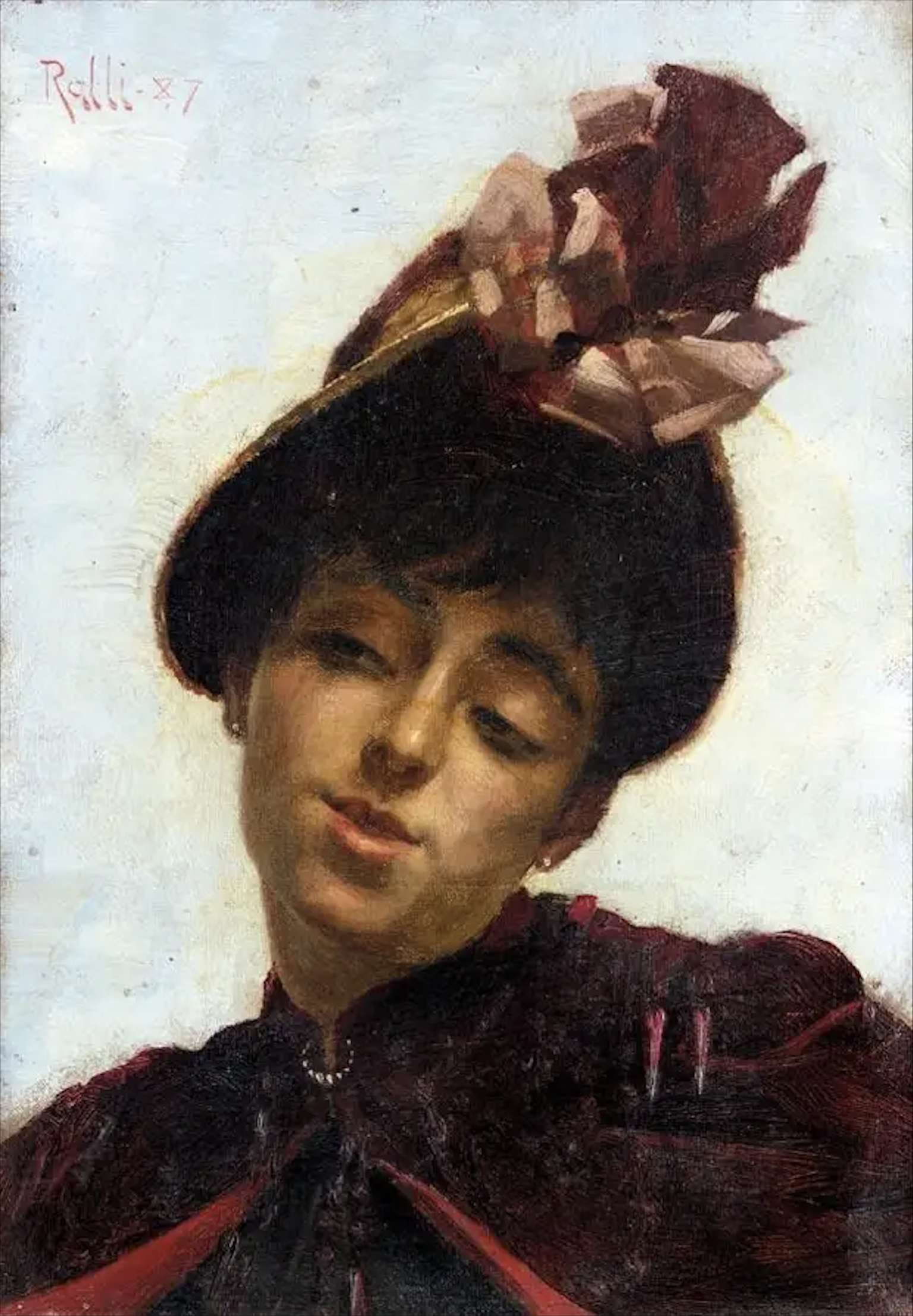
Woman in an Elegant Hat, by Théodore Ralli, same young woman wearing the same hat in 1887.

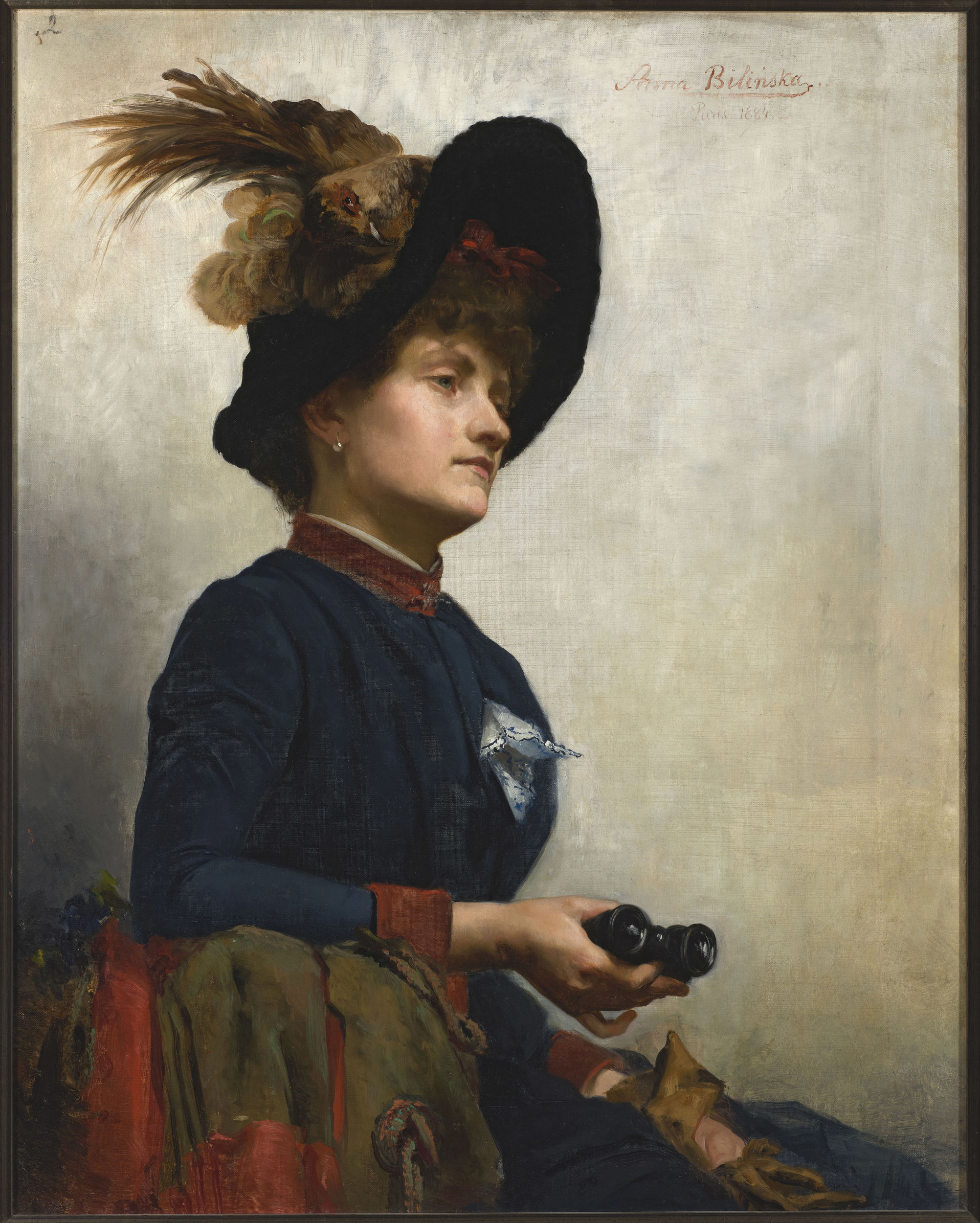
Portrait of a Lady with Opera Glasses wearing a toque hat, by Anna Bilińska-Bohdanowicz completed 1884

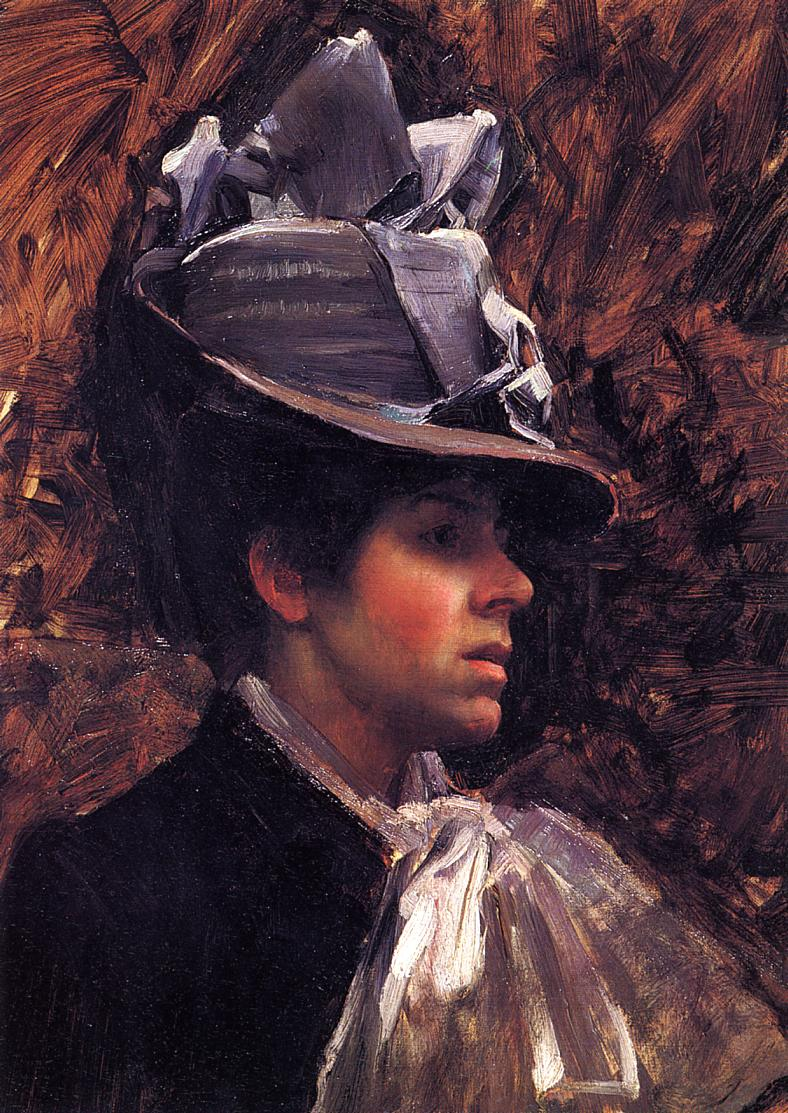
Esther Kenworthy Waterhouse, by John William Waterhouse wearing a toque completed in 1885.

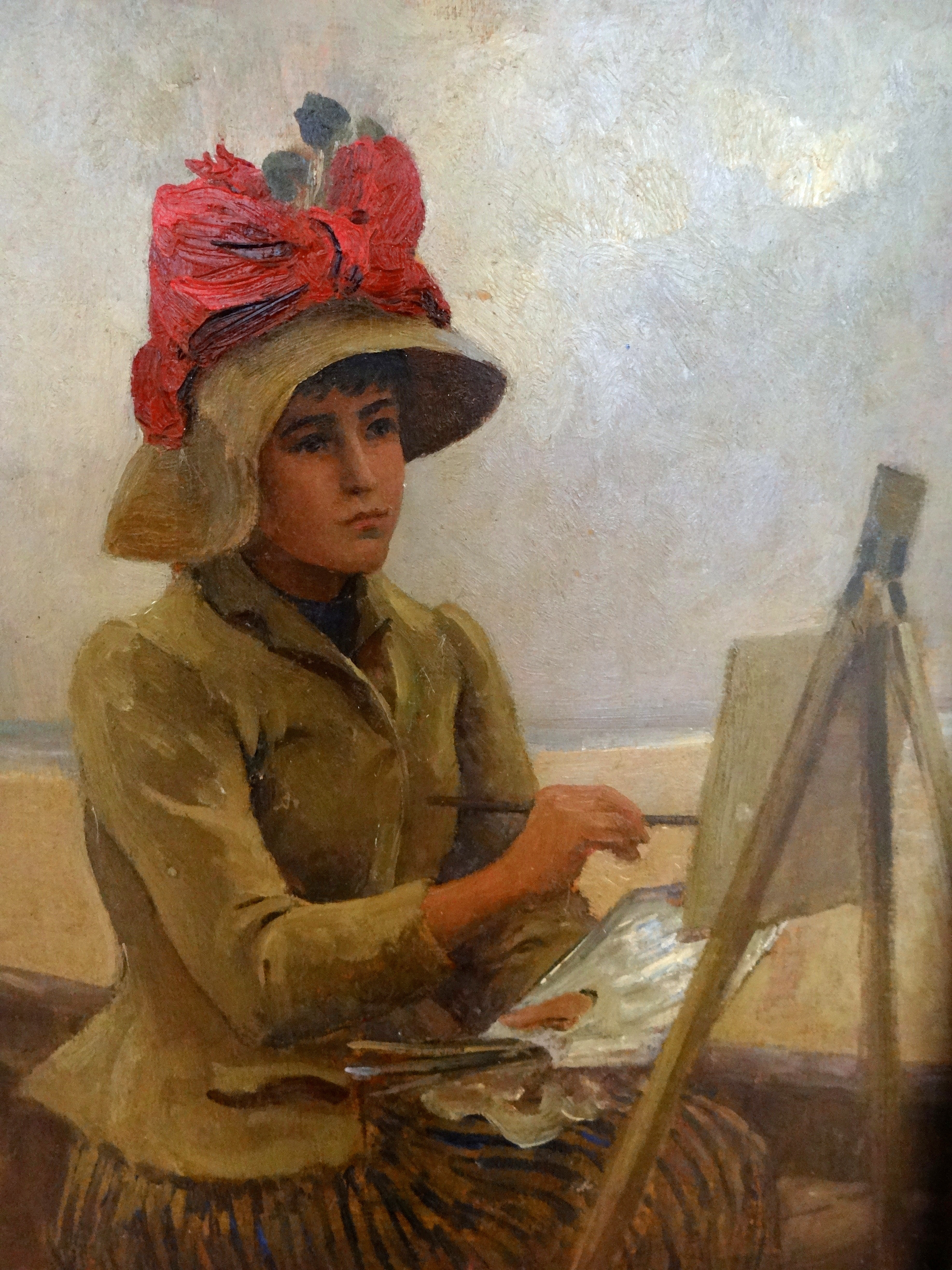
Portrait of Marie Duhem wearing a toque hat, by Virginie Demont-Breton completed 1889

== See also ==
- The Booty

== Bibliography ==
- Palioura, Maria Mirka (2008). Το ζωγραφικό έργο του Θεόδωρου Ράλλη (1852-1909): πηγές έμπνευσης - οριενταλιστικά θέματα [The Work of the Painter Theodoros Rallis (1852-1909): Sources of Inspiration - Orientalist Themes] (Thesis) (in Greek). Athens, Greece: University of Athens. doi:10.12681/eadd/22456.
- Quantin, Albert; Baschet, Ludovic (1885). Le Salon-Artiste : Album de Dessins Originaux D'après Les Oeuvres Exposées Encadrement Et Croquis Exécutés Par Les Artistes Spécialement Pour Cet Ouvrage [The Artist's Salon: Album of Original Drawings Based on the Exhibited Works, Framed and Sketches Executed by the Artists Specially for this Publication]. Paris, France: Albert Quantin Publishing.
- Katsanaki, Maria (2007). Le peintre Théodore Ralli (1852-1909) et son oeuvre [The Painter Théodore Ralli (1852-1909) and his Work] (Thesis) (in French). Paris, France: Université Panthéon-Sorbonne.
- Francis, John Edward (October 23, 1909). "The death in Paris is announced of Théodore Jacques. Ralli". The Athenaeum Journal of English and Foreign Literature, Science, the Fine Arts, Music and the Drama. (4278). London, UK: John C. Francis and J. Edward Francis. "The death in Paris is announced of Théodore Jacques Ralli, a naturalized Frenchman, the son of Greek parents. He was born at Constantinople and studied under Géröme and at the École des Beaux-Arts. He first exhibited at the Salon in 1875. He was a member of the Société des Artistes Français. He devoted himself largely to Oriental scenes, and one of his two pictures in this year's Salon was entitled Circassienne au Bain. He was, for some years, 1879 to 1883, an exhibitor at the Royal Academy."
