= Kiss Me, Kill Me (disambiguation) =

Kiss Me, Kill Me is a 2015 American film.

Kiss Me, Kill Me may also refer to:

- Kiss Me, Kill Me, a 1976 TV drama film directed by Michael O'Herlihy
- An alternative title of the 1973 Italian film Baba Yaga
- An alternative title of the 1982 American film Tag: The Assassination Game
- An alternative title of the 2009 South Korean film Kill Me

== See also ==
- Kill Me Kiss Me (disambiguation)
