= Isehan Cosmetics =

Japanese cosmetics manufacturer

ISEHAN Co., Ltd.
- Native name: 株式会社伊勢半
- Company type: Public (K.K)
- Industry: Cosmetics
- Founded: 1825
- Headquarters: Chiyoda, Tokyo, Japan
- Number of employees: 290
- Website: https://www.isehan.co.jp

Isehan Co., Ltd. (Japanese: 伊勢半) is a Japanese cosmetics manufacturer founded as a family shop in 1825. The company was one of the first to market a branded cosmetics product in 1935 with a saffron-based beni lip-gloss sold in china pots as "Kiss Me" (Japanese キス・ミー). The brand developed to include western style lipsticks, and a larger cosmetics range still marketed today but with English lettering as Kiss Me. The Minato-ku, Tokyo, main branch of Isehan has a small museum on the company's history.
