= Kisin (surname) =

Kisin or Kissin (Cyrillic: Кисин) is a Russian-language surname. In Slavic countries, it is masculine, and its feminine form is Kisina. The surname may refer to the following notable people:

- Evgeny Kissin (born 1971), Russian-born concert pianist and composer
- Konstantin Kisin (born 1982), Russian-British satirist, author and political commentator
- Mark Kisin, Soviet-American mathematician
