= Music of Kamen Rider Den-O =

Seventeenth installment in the popular Kamen Rider Series of tokusatsu programs

Kamen Rider Den-O (仮面ライダー電王, Kamen Raidā Den'ō; Masked Rider Den-O) is the seventeenth installment in the popular Kamen Rider Series of tokusatsu programs. As part of the series, several musical releases through Avex Mode were made for the series opening themes, ending themes, image songs, and original soundtracks. Most songs are rearrangements of the initial opening and ending themes.

== Climax Jump ==
- Lyrics: Shoko Fujibayashi (藤林 聖子, Fujibayashi Shōko)
- Composition & Arrangement: Shuhei Naruse
- Artist: AAA DEN-O form
- Episodes: 1-39, 46

"Climax Jump" (released March 21, 2007) was performed by AAA under the name "AAA DEN-O form". The other "edits" of "Climax Jump" that were released on the single were used as background music for the series. It debuted at #5 on the Oricon weekly charts, becoming the first of AAA's singles to reach the top five of the charts. It was also certified by the Recording Industry Association of Japan as a Gold Record in March 2008, one year after the release.

For the introduction of Climax Form in episode 28, "Climax Jump" was used as the ending theme. In the finale, the instrumental version of "Climax Jump" was used as a true ending theme, playing over the end credits, instead of over the battle.

"Climax Jump" was later released on the Kamen Rider Decade album Masked Rider series Theme song Re-Product CD SONG ATTACK RIDE Third featuring DEN-O KABUTO HIBIKI, where it was rearranged by both RIDER CHIPS and Shuhei Naruse.

=== HIPHOP ver. ===
- Lyrics: Shoko Fujibayashi
- Composition, Arrangement, & Remix: Shuhei Naruse
- Artist: AAA Den-O form
- Episodes: 13-16, I'm Born!, 37, Climax Deka

This version of "Climax Jump" plays when Ryutaros takes over Ryotaro and he is accompanied by his "dancers" until "Double-Action Gun form" was recorded and used in its place in episode 21. It was played in the movie when R-Ryotaro arrived at the Climax Scene.

=== DEN-LINER form ===
- Lyrics: Shoko Fujibayashi
- Composition: Shuhei Naruse
- Arrangement: LOVE+HATE
- Artist: Momotaros, Urataros, Kintaros, Ryutaros (Toshihiko Seki, Kōji Yusa, Masaki Terasoma, Kenichi Suzumura)
- Episodes: 40-45, 47-48, Climax Deka

"Climax Jump DEN-LINER form" (released December 19, 2007) is an arrangement of "Climax Jump" that has Momotaros, Urataros, Kintaros, and Ryutaros singing. It was used as the opening theme song starting on episode 40. The single for the song had four different CD jackets for each of the four Tarōs. This designated what bonus track (a remix of "Climax Jump" named after the Imagin's catchphrase) would be found on the disc (the "Ore, Sanjō!" remix, the "Tsuraretemiru?" remix, the "Nakerude" remix, and the "Kotae wa Kiitenai!" remix).

In its first week, the "Climax Jump DEN-LINER form" single sold 66,000 records, reaching #2 on the Oricon Styles weekly album rankings, higher than any previous Kamen Rider Series single. It reached #62 on 2008 Yearly singles Oricon chart. It also was certified as a Gold Record by the RIAJ.

=== Dark HIPHOP ver. ===
- Lyrics: Shoko Fujibayashi
- Composition, Arrangement, & Remix: Shuhei Naruse
- Artist: AAA Den-O form
- Episodes: 37

This version of "Climax Jump" plays when Kai arrives and takes control of people.

=== pop'n form ===
An arrangement of "Climax Jump" entitled "Climax Jump pop'n form" appears in the arcade game pop'n music 16 PARTY♪ and is performed entirely by Shuhei Naruse.

=== Climax Jump the Final ===
- Lyrics: Shoko Fujibayashi
- Composition & Arrangement: Shuhei Naruse
- Guitar: AYANO (of FULL AHEAD)
- Artist: AAA DEN-O form

"Climax Jump the Final" is a new arrangement of "Climax Jump" recorded for Saraba Kamen Rider Den-O: Final Countdown. It was included on the album Ī jan! Ī jan! Sugē jan!?.

=== Cho Climax Jump ===
- Lyrics: Shoko Fujibayashi
- Composition & Arrangement: Shuhei Naruse
- Artist: Den-O All Stars (電王オールスターズ, Den'ō Ōru Sutāzu): Momotaros (Toshihiko Seki), Urataros (Kōji Yusa), Kintaros (Masaki Terasoma), Ryutaros (Kenichi Suzumura), Teddy (Daisuke Ono), the Owner (Kenjirō Ishimaru), Kotaro Nogami (Dori Sakurada), Naomi (Rina Akiyama), and Kohana (Tamaki Matsumoto)

"Cho Climax Jump" (超 Climax Jump, Chō Kuraimakkusu Janpu) is a new arrangement of "Climax Jump" recorded for Cho Kamen Rider Den-O & Decade Neo Generations: The Onigashima Warship, released on April 22, 2009.

=== Climax Jump for U ===
- Artist: Momotaros, Urataros, Kintaros, Ryutaros, Deneb, Sieg, Teddy (Toshihiko Seki, Kōji Yusa, Masaki Terasoma, Kenichi Suzumura, Hōchū Ōtsuka, Shin-ichiro Miki, Daisuke Ono)

"Climax Jump for U" is the latest rearrangement of "Climax Jump" that was performed on the Imagin stage tour Imagin Super Climax Tour 2010. The song is to first be included on a series of CDs released with purchases of tickets of the show as a "Sampler Size edit" coupled with one of the four main "Double-Action" variations, with its full size version and seven variations included on the Cho CD-Box.

== Double-Action ==
The "Double-Action" line of songs are (initially) a series of duets sung by Ryotaro Nogami and his Imagin partners (actor Takeru Satoh and the voice actor for the Imagin) and are used as the ending theme or the song played in the background of climactic scenes whenever that Imagin's form of Den-O is used. Every CD that a "Double-Action" song is released on also features a version of the song with sound bites of the character's dialogue throughout the song.

=== Sword form ===
- Lyrics: Shoko Fujibayashi
- Composition & Arrangement: LOVE+HATE
- Artist: Ryotaro Nogami & Momotaros (Takeru Satoh & Toshihiko Seki)
- Episodes: 3-7, 10-11, 14, 16, 18-19, 23, 33, 41, Climax Deka

"Double-Action Sword form" features the Imagin Momotaros (Toshihiko Seki) as Ryotaro's singing partner and is sung in a Eurobeat style.

=== Rod form ===
- Lyrics: Shoko Fujibayashi
- Composition: LOVE+HATE
- Arrangement: Yōichi Sakai (酒井 陽一, Sakai Yōichi)
- Artist: Ryotaro Nogami & Urataros (Takeru Satoh & Kōji Yusa)
- Episodes: 8-9, 15, 22, 44, Climax Deka

"Double-Action Rod form" features the Imagin Urataros (Kōji Yusa) as Ryotaro's singing partner and has a ska beat.

=== Ax form ===
- Lyrics: Shoko Fujibayashi
- Composition: LOVE+HATE, Shuhei Naruse
- Arrangement: Shuhei Naruse
- Artist: Ryotaro Nogami & Kintaros (Takeru Satoh & Masaki Terasoma)
- Episodes: 15, 24, 31, 40, 44, Climax Deka

"Double-Action Ax form" features the Imagin Kintaros (Masaki Terasoma) in the duet singing in an enka style.

=== Gun form ===
- Lyrics: Shoko Fujibayashi
- Composition: LOVE+HATE, Shuhei Naruse
- Arrangement: Shuhei Naruse
- Artist: Ryotaro Nogami & Ryutaros (Takeru Satoh & Kenichi Suzumura)
- Episodes: 17, 21, 23, 26, 44, Climax Deka

"Double-Action Gun form" replaces "Climax Jump HIPHOP ver." as the song that plays whenever Ryutaros (Kenichi Suzumura) is in control of Ryotaro and sings in the duet with him. It is sung in a hip hop style.

=== Wing form ===
- Lyrics: Shoko Fujibayashi
- Composition: LOVE+HATE
- Arrangement: Shuhei Naruse
- Artist: Ryotaro Nogami & Sieg (Takeru Satoh & Shin-ichiro Miki)
- Episodes: 49 (Finale), I'm Born! Final Cut Version

"Double-Action Wing form" was featured in the finale episode and has an Arabic pop style. During the ending credits of the finale, the song was accidentally titled "Climax Jump Wing form". Toei later released a statement correcting this error in the Den-O production blog and that a single for "Double-Action Wing form" would be released on March 26, 2008. On its first day on the market, the single for "Double-Action Wing form" started out at #2 on the Oricon. It ended its first week at #5 on the Oricon's weekly charts. "Double-Action Wing form" later was used in the Final Cut Version of Kamen Rider Den-O: I'm Born!, the DVD of which also included a CD with the song and a version of the song featuring Sieg's dialogue from the movie.

=== Piano form ===
- Composition: LOVE+HATE
- Episodes: 33-34

"Double-Action Piano form (1-4)" is an instrumental version of "Double-Action" played on a grand piano as part of the storyline to episodes 33 and 34. The various versions of "Double-Action Piano form" were released on the "Real-Action" and "Double-Action Coffee form" singles.

=== Coffee form ===
- Lyrics: Shoko Fujibayashi
- Composition: LOVE+HATE, Shuhei Naruse
- Arrangement: Shuhei Naruse
- Artist: Naomi & Airi Nogami (Rina Akiyama & Wakana Matsumoto)
- Episodes: 36

"Double-Action Coffee form" is the first "Double-Action" arrangement that is not used as an ending theme, but as an insert song, as both characters who sing the song are non-combatants. This song and "Real-Action" were released as singles on September 26, 2007. As a version of "Double-Action", it has a J-pop style.

=== GAOH form ===
- Lyrics: Shoko Fujibayashi
- Composition: LOVE+HATE, Shuhei Naruse
- Arrangement: Shuhei Naruse
- Artist: Kamen Rider Gaoh (Hiroyuki Watanabe)
- Episodes: I'm Born! Final Cut Version

"Double-Action GAOH form" is an arrangement of "Double-Action" that is the only solo act with a deathrock feel that was released on the original soundtrack for Kamen Rider Den-O: I'm Born!, but was not used in the theatrical release of the film. It was later used on the DVD release's Final Cut Version and used as an "ending theme" for Kamen Rider Gaoh.

=== CLIMAX form ===
- Lyrics: Shoko Fujibayashi
- Composition: LOVE+HATE, Shuhei Naruse
- Arrangement: Shuhei Naruse
- Artist: Momotaros, Urataros, Kintaros, Ryutaros, Deneb (Toshihiko Seki, Kōji Yusa, Masaki Terasoma, Kenichi Suzumura, Hōchū Ōtsuka)

"Double-Action CLIMAX form" is an arrangement of "Double-Action" that is the only quintet vocalist arrangement. Its single was released on April 16, 2008. Shuhei Naruse arranged and composed the song. Like "Climax Jump DEN-LINER form", the single has variant covers which designate its bonus track (the song's rap being sung by the Imagin on the cover). These singles also include a DVD of the music video. A sixth single has all five Imagin on the cover, but does not have a bonus track nor a DVD. On its first day of release, the singles reached #3 on the Oricon Daily charts. It ended its first week on the Oricon at #4 on the Weekly Single Charts.

=== Strike form ===
- Lyrics: Shoko Fujibayashi
- Composition: LOVE+HATE
- Arrangement: Ryo (of defspiral)
- Artist: Kotaro Nogami & Teddy (Dori Sakurada & Daisuke Ono)

"Double-Action Strike form" is a rock arrangement of "Double-Action" that serves as the theme song for Kamen Rider New Den-O. Its premiere is in the film Episode Blue: The Dispatched Imagin is Newtral.

== Other songs ==
In addition to the "Climax Jump" and "Double-Action" remixes, there were several songs released that were original compositions for Den-O.

=== Action-ZERO ===
- Lyrics: Shoko Fujibayashi
- Composition & Arrangement: LOVE+HATE
- Artist: Yuto Sakurai & Deneb (Yuichi Nakamura & Hōchū Ōtsuka)
- Episodes: 25, 27, 32, 35, 37, 46, Climax Deka

"Action-ZERO" has a heavy metal style. It is the first ending theme that is not a "Double-Action" arrangement. However, it is still a duet between Yuto Sakurai and Deneb, and is used as the theme song for Kamen Rider Zeronos. A piano arrangement titled "Action-ZERO Piano form" was included as a B-side on the "Double-Action Wing form" single.

==== 2010 ====
- Lyrics: Shoko Fujibayashi
- Composition: LOVE+HATE
- Arrangement: Shuhei Naruse

"Action-ZERO 2010" is a balladic arrangement of "Action-ZERO" that is used as the theme song for the film Episode Red: Zero no Star Twinkle. The single includes solo renditions by Yuichi Nakamura as Yuto Sakurai and Hōchū Ōtsuka as Deneb.

=== Yume de Aeta nara... ===
- Lyrics, Composition, & Arrangement: Shogo (SHOGO（ショーゴ）, Shōgo)
- Artist: 175R

"Yume de Aeta Nara..." (夢で逢えたなら...; If We Met in a Dream...) is the second song for Den-O that was commissioned by an artist who was not a member of the series' cast. The song by 175R was used as the theme song for the film Kamen Rider Den-O: I'm Born!.

=== Real-Action ===
- Lyrics: Shoko Fujibayashi
- Composition & Arrangement: Ryo (of defspiral)
- Artist: Ryotaro Nogami (Takeru Satoh)
- Episodes: 36, 38-39, 42, 45, Climax Deka

"Real-Action" has a rock style. It is the second ending theme that is not a "Double-Action" arrangement and is used as an ending theme for Kamen Rider Den-O Liner Form (the only form that Ryotaro fights by himself).

=== Den-O vocal tracks liner ===
"DEN-O VOCAL TRACKS LINER (C-J D-A nonstop re-connection)" appeared on the second original soundtrack as a "non-stop remix" (ノンストップリミックス, nonsutoppu rimikkusu) of the songs performed by the cast at the time of its release. It features remixes of "Double-Action", "Double-Action Rod form", "Double-Action Ax form", "Double-Action Gun form", "Double-Action Coffee form", "Double-Action GAOH form", "Action-ZERO", "Real-Action", and "Climax Jump DEN-LINER form".

=== Climax-Action ===
- Lyrics: Shoko Fujibayashi
- Composition: Shuhei Narusei & LOVE+HATE
- Arrangement: LOVE+HATE
- Artists included: AAA DEN-O form, Ryotaro Nogami (Takeru Satoh), Momotaros (Toshihiko Seki), Urataros (Kōji Yusa), Kintaros (Masaki Terasoma), Ryutaros (Kenichi Suzumura), Airi (Wakana Matsumoto), Naomi (Rina Akiyama), Sieg (Shin-ichiro Miki), Yuto Sakurai (Yuichi Nakamura), Deneb (Hōchū Ōtsuka)

"Climax-Action ~the Den-O History~" (Climax-Action～the 電王 History～) is a new song to serve as the theme for Episode Yellow: Treasure de End Pirates. The song is a medley of all of the "Climax Jump", the "Double-Action" songs (without "CLIMAX form" or "Strike form"), and "Action-ZERO"; sung portions of "GAOH form" and "Real-Action" are omitted, but instrumental portions from their songs are included. The B-side for its CD single is Kamen Rider Diend's theme: "Treasure Sniper" by Daiki Kaito (Kimito Totani). This medley is sung in an orchestra.

== Albums ==
Several albums were released for Kamen Rider Den-O, mostly original soundtracks for the series and films.

=== Original Soundtrack ===
The Kamen Rider Den-O Original Soundtrack (仮面ライダー電王 オリジナルサウンドトラック, Kamen Raidā Den'ō Orijinaru Saundotorakku) was released on June 27, 2007, and features the musical score for the first half of the series, "Climax Jump HIPHOP ver.", and TV size versions of "Climax Jump" and all four "Double-Action" renditions featured in the series up to the album's release.

Kamen Rider Den-O Original Soundtrack
No.	Title	Length
1.	"Ore, Sanjō" (俺、参上 (Here I Come))
2.	"DenLiner Shutsudō" (デンライナー出動 (DenLiner Launch))
3.	"Kyūkō" (急行 (Express Line))
4.	"Oresama dā" (俺様だー (Me!))
5.	"Dandy na Boku" (ダンディな僕 (The Dandy Me))
6.	"Ore wa Nakerudē" (俺は泣けるデー (I've Made You Weep))
7.	"Kotae wa Kiitenai" (答えは聞いてない (Your Answer Doesn't Matter))
8.	"Yōki na Jōmuin" (陽気な乗務員 (Cheerful Crew))
9.	"Himerareta Kako" (秘められた過去 (A Concealed Past))
10.	"Airi to Bōenkyō" (愛理と望遠鏡 (Airi and the Telescope))
11.	"Fuun na Ryotaro" (不運な良太郎 (Unlucky Ryotaro))
12.	"Fuan na Dekigoto" (不安な出来事 (Uncertain Events))
13.	"Fukakai na Dekigoto" (不可解な出来事 (Incomprehensible Events))
14.	"Imagin Blues" (イマジンブルース)
15.	"Imagin to no Keiyaku" (イマジンとの契約 (The Imagin's Contract))
16.	"Hakai" (破壊 (Destruction))
17.	"Ikari no Zetchō" (怒りの絶頂 (Climax of Anger))
18.	"Semarikuru Suspense" (迫り来るサスペンス (Approaching Suspense))
19.	"Toppatsu Jiken" (突発事件 (Sudden Event))
20.	"Shutsudō Machine" (出動マシーン (Launch the Machine))
21.	"Fujōri na Ikari" (不条理な怒り (Irrational Anger))
22.	"Okotta zō" (怒ったぞー (You've Made Me Angry))
23.	"Boku ni Makasete" (僕に任せて (Leave It to Me))
24.	"DenLiner Sōkōgeki" (デンライナー総攻撃 (DenLiner All Out Attack))
25.	"Toki no Suna" (時の砂 (The Sands of Time))
26.	"Kanashimi no Shinjō" (悲しみの心情 (Feelings of Sorrow))
27.	"Teikyō 1" (提供1 (Offer 1))
28.	"Teikyō 2" (提供2 (Offer 2))
29.	"Climax Jump HIPHOP ver."
30.	"Double-Action TV-SIZE EDIT."
31.	"Double-Action Rod form TV-SIZE EDIT."
32.	"Double-Action Ax form TV-SIZE EDIT."
33.	"Double-Action Gun form TV-SIZE EDIT."
34.	"Climax Jump TV-SIZE EDIT."

=== Perfect-Action ~Double-Action Complete Collection~ ===
Perfect-Action ~Double-Action Complete Collection~ (released on August 1, 2007) features "Double-Action", "Rod form", "Ax form", "Gun form", versions containing dialogue for all characters (including a new version for "Double-Action"), instrumentals for all four tracks, and the bonus track "Double-Action Bonus form" which is a short version of "Double-Action" with original dialogue for all four Imagin.

=== I'm Born! Original Soundtrack ===
The Kamen Rider Den-O The Movie: I'm Born! Original Soundtrack (劇場版 仮面ライダー電王 俺、誕生！オリジナルサウンドトラック, Gekijōban Kamen Raidā Den'ō: Ore, Tanjō! Orijinaru Saundotorakku) was released on October 24, 2007, and features "Double-Action GAOH form" and its dialogue version as part of the film's soundtrack.

Kamen Rider Den-O The Movie: I'm Born! Original Soundtrack
No.	Title	Length
1.	"Nozomi o Ie" (望みを言え, Tell Me Your Wish)
2.	"Joshō" (序章, Prologue)
3.	"Ore, Tanjō!!" (俺、誕生!!, I'm Born!!)
4.	"Inbō, Gekiha" (陰謀～撃破, Conspiracy ~ Crushing)
5.	"Natsu no Hitokoma" (夏のひとこま, Summer Scene)
6.	"Gaoh Tōjō" (牙王登場, Gaoh Appears)
7.	"Kōdō" (行動, Action)
8.	"Kazoku no Shōzō" (家族の肖像, Family Portrait)
9.	"Hatena?" (はてな?, Oh My?)
10.	"Waga wa Sieg" (我はジーク, I Am Sieg)
11.	"Mugen Pass" (無限パス, Infinite Pass)
12.	"Kami no Rosen e" (神の路線へ, Towards God's Line)
13.	"Shinpi no Rosen" (神秘の路線, Mysterious Line)
14.	"Shutsudō ZeroLiner" (出動ゼロライナー, Launch the ZeroLiner)
15.	"Gaoh Henshin" (牙王変身, Gaoh Transforms)
16.	"Yume no Kyōryū Jidai" (夢の恐竜時代, Dream in the Dinosaur Era)
17.	"Kotaro" (小太郎)
18.	"Time Traveller" (タイムトラベラー)
19.	"Gaoh no Inbō" (牙王の陰謀, Gaoh's Conspiracy)
20.	"Ninja Raishū" (忍者来襲, Ninja Attack)
21.	"Ore, Sanjō!! Kotaro form" (俺、参上!!小太郎form, Here I Come!! Kotaro form)
22.	"Kazoku Ai" (家族愛, Family Love)
23.	"Ashita e no Kibō" (明日への希望, Hope Towards Tomorrow)
24.	"Nazo no Kago" (謎の籠, The Mysterious Key)
25.	"Hime no Kago" (姫の籠, The Princess's Key)
26.	"Rantō" (乱闘, Scuffle)
27.	"Dairantō" (大乱闘, Melee)
28.	"Kaijin Shutsugen" (怪人出現, Monsters Appear)
29.	"Kōrin Wing Form" (降臨ウイングフォーム, Wing Form Descends)
30.	"Shin'uchi Tōjō" (真打登場, The Star Appears)
31.	"Kami no Densha" (神の電車, God's Train)
32.	"Hakaijin" (破壊神, Destroyer)
33.	"Toki no Kioku" (時の記憶, Time's Memories)
34.	"4 Dai Form" (4大フォーム, The Four Big Forms)
35.	"Saikyō! Vega Form" (最強！ベガフォーム, The Strongest! Vega Form)
36.	"4 Dai Action" (4大アクション, The Four Big Actions)
37.	"Gaoh Climax" (牙王クライマックス)
38.	"Hissatsu Double Charge" (必殺ダブルチャージ, Deadly Double Charge)
39.	"Daikonsen" (大混戦, Chaos)
40.	"Fukkatsu no Kizashi" (復活の兆し, Signs of Revival)
41.	"Kazoku Ai Bōkyō" (家族愛望郷, Nostalgic Family Love)
42.	"Kazoku Ai Daidan'en" (家族愛大団円, Ending Family Love)
43.	"Altair Form" (アルタイルフォーム)
44.	"ZeroLiner" (ゼロライナー)
45.	"Momotaros no Natsuyasumi" (モモタロスのなつやすみ, Momotaros's Summer Vacation)
46.	"Double-Action GAOH form"
47.	"Double-Action GAOH form Gaoh Serifu Ver." (Double-Action GAOH form 牙王セリフ Ver.)

=== Original Soundtrack Vol.2 ===
The Kamen Rider Den-O Original Soundtrack Vol.2 (仮面ライダー電王 オリジナルサウンドトラック Vol.2, Kamen Raidā Den'ō Orijinaru Saundotorakku Vol.2) was released on December 19, 2007, and features "DEN-O VOCAL TRACKS LINER (C-J D-A nonstop re-connection)" as a track as well as the soundtrack for the latter half of the series.

Kamen Rider Den-O Original Soundtrack
No.	Title	Length
1.	"Yume no Jikan Ryokō" (夢の時間旅行 (Dreamy Time Traveling))
2.	"Liner Form" (ライナーフォーム)
3.	"KingLiner" (キングライナー)
4.	"DenKamen Sword" (デンカメンソード)
5.	"Henshin wa Shita Keredo" (変身はしたけれど (But I Transformed))
6.	"Ore wa Kai" (俺はカイ (I Am Kai))
7.	"Kaigenshō" (怪現象 (Bizarre Behavior))
8.	"Semarikuru Kiki" (迫り来る危機 (Looming Crisis))
9.	"Jōrenkyaku" (常連客 (Patrons))
10.	"Ojōsama Ote o Dōzo" (お嬢様お手をどうぞ (Please Give Me Your Hand, M'Lady))
11.	"Hatarakimasu" (働きます (Working))
12.	"DenLiner Showtime!" (デンライナーショータイム)
13.	"Mazuin ja~ nāi" (マズインジャ~なーい (It's Not Shoddy))
14.	"Hisoka na Himegoto" (密かな秘め事 (Secret Secretivity))
15.	"Kiku ni Kikenai Koto" (聞くに聞けない事 (Listening to Things Unheard))
16.	"Jikū Terminal" (時空ターミナル (Time Terminal))
17.	"Jikū Terminal Unkō" (時空ターミナル運行 (Time Terminal Service))
18.	"Image no Bōsō" (イメージの暴走 (Imagery Madness))
19.	"Jikū Ryokōsha" (時空旅行者 (Space-Time Traveller))
20.	"Bimyō na Kanji" (ビミョーな感じ (Exquisite Feeling))
21.	"Unkō Funō" (運行不能 (Out of Service))
22.	"Action DenBird" (アクションデンバード)
23.	"Tokkyū DenLiner" (特急デンライナー (Super Express DenLiner))
24.	"Aoiki Toiki" (青息吐息 (Hard Times))
25.	"Kokō no Hiro" (孤高のヒーロー (Untamable Hero))
26.	"Zero Form" (ゼロフォーム)
27.	"Denebic Buster" (デネビックバスター)
28.	"Dai Panic" (大パニック (Big Panic))
29.	"Senryaku" (戦略 (Strategy))
30.	"Shachū no Dekigoto" (車中の出来事 (Events on the Train))
31.	"Kohana no Yume" (コハナの夢 (Kohana's Dream))
32.	"Kawayui Kohana" (カワユイコハナ (Cute Kohana))
33.	"Airi no Namida" (愛理の涙 (Airi's Tears))
34.	"Toki no Nagare" (時の流れ (The Flow of Time))
35.	"Kieta Kako" (消えた過去 (Vanished Past))
36.	"Kibō no Yoake" (希望の夜明け (Hopeful Dawn))
37.	"Asu e no Kibō" (明日への希望 (Hope for Tomorrow))
38.	"Kazokuai" (家族愛 (Family Love))
39.	"Kibō no Mirai" (希望の未来 (Hopeful Future))
40.	"Yasashii Kokoro" (優しい心 (Gentle Heart))
41.	"Akarui Dekigoto" (明るい出来事 (Joyful Occurrence))
42.	"DEN-O VOCAL TRACKS LINER (C-J D-A nonstop re-connection)"

=== Complete CD Box ===
The Kamen Rider Den-O Complete CD Box (仮面ライダー電王 COMPLETE CD BOX, Kamen Raidā Den'ō COMPLETE CD BOX) was a box set released on January 16, 2008, that featured every song released for Kamen Rider Den-O up until that date, a total of 120 tracks. The box set includes "Climax Jump Dark HIPHOP ver.", the instrumental for "Double-Action GAOH form", and a series of soundbyte versions of the four primary "Double-Action" variations initially released as ringtones.

=== Imagin Absurd Card Game ===
Kamen Rider Den-O: Imagin Absurd Card Game (仮面ライダー電王 イマジンメチャ盛りかるた, Kamen Raidā Den'ō Imajin Mecha Mori Karuta) was a drama CD released on January 24, 2008, with artwork in the style of the Imagin Anime DVDs.

=== Play with the Imagin! ===
Telebi-kun New Year's Present Supplement: Kamen Rider Den-O Special CD: Play with the Imagin! (てれびくんお年玉ふろく 仮面ライダー電王スペシャルCD イマジンとあそぼう!, Terebikun Otoshidama Furoku: Kamen Raidā Den'ō Supesharu CD: Imajin to Asobou!) is another drama CD that has the listener play games with the Imagin.

=== Ī jan! Ī jan! Sugē jan!? ===
Ī jan! Ī jan! Sugē jan!? (いーじゃん！いーじゃん！スゲーじゃん!?; It's Good! It's Great! Isn't it Awesome!?) is an album, released on October 1, 2008, that features the release of "Climax Jump the Final", as well as rearrangements of "Climax Jump" titled "Climax Jump Sword form", "Climax Jump Rod form", "Climax Jump Ax form", "Climax Jump Gun form" (all of which also had dialogue versions), and "Climax Jump Piano form". Two versions of the album were released, one of which had a DVD with music videos for all of the "form" variations of "Climax Jump" included on the album.

Ī jan! Ī jan! Sugē jan!?
No.	Title	Length
1.	"Climax Jump the Final"	4:40
2.	"Climax Jump Sword form"	4:32
3.	"Climax Jump Rod form"	4:17
4.	"Climax Jump Ax form"	4:39
5.	"Climax Jump Gun form"	3:41
6.	"Climax Jump Sword form Momotaros Serifu Ver."	4:34
7.	"Climax Jump Rod form Urataros Serifu Ver."	4:18
8.	"Climax Jump Ax form Kintaros Serifu Ver."	4:40
9.	"Climax Jump Gun form Ryutaros Serifu Ver."	3:41
10.	"Climax Jump Piano form"	3:57
Total length:		42:51

=== Radi-Taros ===
The Radi-Taros (ラジタロス, Rajitarosu) Internet radio albums featured recordings of "web radio" shows hosted by the cast. Two CDs were released on November 12, 2008, under this title.

=== Final Countdown Original Soundtrack ===
The Saraba Kamen Rider Den-O: Final Countdown Original Soundtrack (さらば仮面ライダー電王 ファイナル・カウントダウン オリジナルサウンドトラック, Saraba Kamen Raidā Den'ō: Fainaru Kauntodaun Orijinaru Saundotorakku) was released on November 26, 2008, and featured "Climax Jump the Final" and the score for the film.

Saraba Kamen Rider Den-O: Final Countdown
No.	Title	Length
1.	"Ama Kakeru Yūrei Ressha" (天駆ける幽霊列車 (The Empyrean-passing Ghost Train))
2.	"Nonki na Nakama" (のんきな仲間 (Easygoing Companions))
3.	"Nazo no Rannyūsha" (謎の乱入者 (Puzzling Intruder))
4.	"New DenLiner" (ニューデンライナー)
5.	"Countdown" (カウントダウン)
6.	"Futari no Niramiai" (二人の睨み合い (Two to Glare))
7.	"Kotaro no Thema" (幸太郎のテーマ (Kotaro's Theme))
8.	"Kiken na Mono to wa?" (危険なものとは？ (Dangerous ones?))
9.	"Sora no Scat" (ソラのスキャット (Sora's Scat))
10.	"Momotaros no Boke" (モモタロスのぼけ (Momotaros in the dumps))
11.	"Yūrei Ressha no Kehai" (幽霊列車の気配 (Sign of the Ghost Train))
12.	"Shiro no Sakuryaku" (死朗の策略 (Shiro's Maneuver))
13.	"Kotaro no Shutsudō" (幸太郎の出動 (Kotaro's Move))
14.	"Yūrei Ressha no Tsuiseki" (幽霊列車の追跡 (Pursuing the Ghost Train))
15.	"Tsuyoi Den-O" (強い電王 (Strong Den-O))
16.	"Yuuki to no Taiketsu" (幽汽との対決 (Confrontation with Yuuki))
17.	"Owner no Doryoku" (オーナーの努力 (Owner's Effort))
18.	"Shiro to no Taiketsu" (死郎との対決 (Confrontation with Shiro))
19.	"Kotaro no Kiki, Ryotaro no Chikara" (幸太郎の危機～良太郎の力 (Kotaro's Crisis ~ Ryotaro's Power))
20.	"Momotaros no Yasashisa" (モモタロスの優しさ (Momotaros' Kindness))
21.	"Toki no Naka no DenLiner" (時の中のデンライナー (In Time in the DenLiner))
22.	"Osoi zo Mina no Mono" (遅いぞ皆の者 (Meeting Everyone Later))
23.	"Nagaya de no Momotaros-tachi" (長屋でのモモタロス達 (In a Nagaya with Momotaros and Friends))
24.	"Jōkamachi de no Nanpa" (城下町での軟派 (Scam in the Castle Town))
25.	"Nagaya de no Oneechan" (長屋でのお姉ちゃん (In a Nagaya with Sis))
26.	"Shiro ga Yarō to Shiteiru Koto" (死郎がやろうとしている事 (Shiro's Attempts))
27.	"Sorezore no Omoi" (それぞれの想い (Those Thoughts))
28.	"Sanzoku no Atsumari" (山賊の集まり (Gathering of Bandits))
29.	"Teddy no Kiki" (テディの危機 (Teddy's Crisis))
30.	"Ryotaro e no Omoi" (良太郎への想い (Thoughts on Ryotaro))
31.	"Sanzoku no Shūgeki" (山賊の襲撃 (The Bandits Attack))
32.	"Sanzoku to no Taiketsu" (山賊との対決 (Confrontation with the Bandits))
33.	"Yuuki to no Taiketsu" (幽汽との対決 (Confrontation with Yuuki))
34.	"Momotaros no Karada o Hatta Omoi" (モモタロスの体を張った想い (Momotaros' Stretched Body))
35.	"Ryotaro no Mezame? Yuuki Bakuhatsu" (良太郎の目覚め?幽汽爆発 (Ryotaro's Awakening? Yuuki Explodes))
36.	"Shiro no Henshin" (死郎の変身 (Shiro's Transformation))
37.	"Ore, Futatabi Sanjō" (俺、再び参上 (Here I Come, Again))
38.	"Ransen" (乱戦 (Dogfight))
39.	"Bajō no Taiketsu" (馬上の対決 (Showdown on Horses))
40.	"Shiro no Otakebi" (死郎の雄たけび (Shiro's Error))
41.	"Full Charge" (フルチャージ)
42.	"Sora to Shiro no Tabidechi" (ソラと死郎の旅出ち (Sora and Shiro's Departure))
43.	"Zō no DenLiner" (象のデンライナー (Elephantine DenLiner))
44.	"Futari no Jikan" (二人の時間 (Two People's Time))
45.	"Kotaro no Jikan" (幸太郎の時間 (Kotaro's Time))
46.	"Climax Jump the Final"

=== The Onigashima Warship Original Soundtrack ===
The Cho Kamen Rider Den-O & Decade The Movie: The Onigashima Warship Original Soundtrack (劇場版 超仮面ライダー電王＆ディケイド 鬼ヶ島の戦艦 オリジナルサウンドトラック, Gekijōban Chō Kamen Raidā Den'ō ando Dikeido: Onigashima no Senkan Orijinaru Saundotorakku) was released on October 21, 2009, and features the score for the film and "Cho Climax Jump".

Cho Kamen Rider Den-O & Decade The Movie: The Onigashima Warship Original Soundtrack
No.	Title	Length
1.	"Ihen no Hajimari" (異変の始まり (The Start of a Disaster))
2.	"Kirai na Inaka Gurashi" (嫌いな田舎暮らし (Hated Country Living))
3.	"Oni to no Sōgū" (鬼との遭遇 (Encounter with the Oni))
4.	"Cho-Den-O" (超電王)
5.	"Oni no Kirifuda" (鬼の切り札 (The Oni's Trump Card))
6.	"Gōwan Mimihiko" (強腕ミミヒコ (Strong-Armed Mimihiko))
7.	"DenLiner no Ticket" (デンライナーのチケット (DenLiner Ticket))
8.	"Oni Kyōdai no Takurami" (鬼兄弟の企み (The Oni Brothers' Plot))
9.	"Haha no Nukumori" (母の温もり (A Mother's Warmth))
10.	"Onigokko" (鬼ごっこ (Tag))
11.	"Yu Toki o Koeru" (ユウ時を越える (Yu Traverses Time))
12.	"Mukae Matsu Kuchihiko" (向かえ待つクチヒコ (Heading for the Waiting Kuchihiko))
13.	"Ekichō no Shinbun" (駅長の新聞 (The Station Master's Newspaper))
14.	"Shōwa Elegy" (昭和エレジー)
15.	"Shōwa Love" (昭和ラブ)
16.	"Hikari Shashinkan" (光写真館 (Hikari Photo Studio))
17.	"Oni no Jidai e ~ Taisen" (鬼の時代へ～対戦 (To the Oni's Time ~ War))
18.	"Sukui no Kami (Den-O)" (救いの神(電王) (The God's Salvation [Den-O]))
19.	"Onigashima no Taisen" (鬼ヶ島の対決 (War for Onigashima))
20.	"Ore Sanjō" (俺 参上 (Here I Come))
21.	"Yu to Deneb no Keiyaku" (ユウとデネブの契約 (Yu & Deneb's Contract))
22.	"Kuchihiko no Kōgeki" (クチヒコの攻撃 (Kuchihiko's Attack))
23.	"DenLiner de no Keikaku" (デンライナーでの計画 (Planning in the DenLiner))
24.	"Yu to Toki" (ユウとトキ (Yu & Toki))
25.	"Hitojichi Kōkan" (人質交換 (Hostage Exchange))
26.	"Ikkikasei" (一気呵成 (Finishing the Job))
27.	"Zannen Deshita" (残念でした (I'm Sorry))
28.	"Hayagawari Ransen" (速代わり乱戦 (A Fast Dogfight))
29.	"Diend no Jama" (ディエンドの邪魔 (Devilish Diend))
30.	"Oni no Daisenkan" (鬼の大戦艦 (The Oni's Warship))
31.	"Rekishi wa Kawaru" (歴史は変わる (History is Changing))
32.	"Climax" (クライマックス)
33.	"Bakuhatsu Mimihiko" (爆発ミミヒコ (Explosive Mimihiko))
34.	"Ransen Daisenkan" (乱戦 大戦艦 (Scramble, Warship))
35.	"Gekichin" (撃沈 (Sunk))
36.	"Wakare no Toki" (別れのとき (Toki's Farewell))
37.	"Yu no Ibasho" (ユウの居場所 (Yu's Whereabouts))
38.	"Cho Climax Jump" (超 Climax Jump)

=== Cho-Den-O Trilogy Original Soundtrack ===
The Cho-Den-O Trilogy Original Soundtrack (超電王トリロジー ORIGINAL SOUNDTRACK, Chō Den'ō Torirojī Orijinaru Saundotorakku) is to be released on May 26, 2010, and features the score for all three films in the Kamen Rider × Kamen Rider × Kamen Rider The Movie: Cho-Den-O Trilogy series.

Cho-Den-O Trilogy: Original Soundtrack
No.	Title	Length
1.	"Ike Ike Title" (イケイケタイトル (EPISODE RED) (Go Go Title))
2.	"Mirai to Kako no Sakurai" (未来と過去の桜井 (EPISODE RED) (The Sakurai of the Past and the Future))
3.	"Yuto no Omoi" (侑斗の想い (EPISODE RED) (Yuto's Feelings))
4.	"Benshi Deneb" (弁士デネブ (EPISODE RED) (Narrator Deneb))
5.	"Yūjūfudan Kikuchi" (優柔不断菊地 (EPISODE RED) (Indecisive Kikuchi))
6.	"Chō Tokkyū DenLiner" (超特急デンライナー (EPISODE RED) (The Super-Express DenLiner))
7.	"Ore Sanjō" (俺 参上 (EPISODE RED) (Here I Come))
8.	"Bakusō DenLiner" (爆走デンライナー (EPISODE RED) (The Roaring DenLiner))
9.	"Piggies Ransen" (ピギーズ乱戦 (EPISODE RED) (The Piggies Fight))
10.	"Oretachi no Hissatsu Waza" (俺たちの必殺技 (EPISODE RED) (Our Finishing Attack))
11.	"Futari no Mirai" (二人の未来 (EPISODE RED) (Two People's Future))
12.	"Yōen Mantis Imagin" (妖艶マンティスイマジン (EPISODE BLUE) (The Voluptuous Mantis Imagin))
13.	"Kotaro to Teddy no Omoi" (幸太郎とテディの想い (EPISODE BLUE) (Kotaro & Teddy's Feelings))
14.	"Kotaro to Teddy no Kizuna" (幸太郎とテディの絆 (EPISODE BLUE) (Kotaro & Teddy's Bond))
15.	"Sobo e no Omoi" (祖母への想い (EPISODE BLUE) (Feelings Towards Grandmother))
16.	"Mago to Sobo no Omoi" (孫と祖母の絆 (EPISODE BLUE) (A Granddaughter & Grandmother's Bond))
17.	"Nazo no Shinnyūsha" (謎の侵入者 (EPISODE BLUE) (Mysterious Intruder))
18.	"Imagin no Keikaku" (イマジンの計画 (EPISODE BLUE) (Plan of the Imagin))
19.	"Mantis no Tatakai" (マンティスの戦い (EPISODE BLUE) (The Mantis's Fight))
20.	"Zettai Furi" (絶対不利 (EPISODE BLUE) (Complete Disadvantage))
21.	"Teddy Shōmetsu" (テディ消滅 (EPISODE BLUE) (Teddy Annihilation))
22.	"Kaitō, Daiki" (怪盗 大樹 (EPISODE YELLOW) (Phantom Thief Daiki))
23.	"Jikan Keisatsu" (時間警察 (EPISODE YELLOW) (Time Police))
24.	"Keiyakusha, Daiki" (契約者 大樹 (EPISODE YELLOW) (Contractor Daiki))
25.	"Dai Diving" (大ダイビング (EPISODE YELLOW) (Big Diving))
26.	"Tegami no Imi" (手紙の意味 (EPISODE YELLOW) (The Meaning of the Letter))
27.	"Futari no Diend" (二人のディエンド (EPISODE YELLOW) (Two Diends))
28.	"Jikan Keisatsu, Eve" (時間警察 イブ (EPISODE YELLOW) (Time Police Eve))
29.	"Eve Kyōsen" (イブ狂戦 (EPISODE YELLOW) (Eve Berserk))
30.	"Kyōsen, Hissatsu Waza" (共戦 必殺技 (EPISODE YELLOW) (Joint Fight, Finishing Attack))
31.	"Haha, Bojō" (母 慕情 (EPISODE YELLOW) (Mother, Yearning))
32.	"Action-ZERO 2010 (Movie edit.) (THEME SONG)"
33.	"Double-Action Strike form (Movie edit.) (THEME SONG)"
34.	"Climax-Action (Movie edit.) (THEME SONG)"

=== Cho CD-Box ===
The Kamen Rider Den-O: Cho CD Box (仮面ライダー電王 超・CD-BOX, Kamen Raidā Den'ō Chō CD-BOX) was released on July 28, 2010. It consists of 20 CDs and 2 DVDs, containing a total of 350 songs, one of which is the new song "Climax Jump for U".
