= Kamen Rider × Kamen Rider × Kamen Rider The Movie: Cho-Den-O Trilogy =

2010 Japanese film series

Japanese name
- Kanji: 仮面ライダー×仮面ライダー×仮面ライダー THE MOVIE 超・電王トリロジー
Transcriptions
- Revised Hepburn: Kamen Raidā × Kamen Raidā × Kamen Raidā Za Mūbī: Chō Den'ō Torirojī
- Directed by: Osamu Kaneda (Red); Kenzō Maihara (Blue); Takayuki Shibasaki (Yellow)
- Written by: Yasuko Kobayashi (Red & Blue); Shōji Yonemura (Yellow)
- Produced by: Ishimori Productions; Toei
- Starring: Yuichi Nakamura (Red); Dori Sakurada (Blue); Kimito Totani (Yellow)
- Music by: Toshihiko Sahashi
- Distributed by: Toei Co. Ltd
- Release dates: May 22, 2010 (Red); June 5, 2010 (Blue); June 19, 2010 (Yellow)
- Running time: 72 minutes (Red); 73 minutes (Blue); 74 minutes (Yellow)
- Country: Japan
- Language: Japanese

Kamen Rider × Kamen Rider × Kamen Rider The Movie: Cho-Den-O Trilogy (仮面ライダー×仮面ライダー×仮面ライダー THE MOVIE 超・電王トリロジー, Kamen Raidā × Kamen Raidā × Kamen Raidā Za Mūbī: Chō Den'ō Torirojī) is a superhero tokusatsu series of films part of the Kamen Rider Den-O franchise, particularly its Cho-Den-O Series. It was released beginning on May 22, 2010, with each subsequent chapter of the trilogy released in two week intervals. Each of the films' subtitles contains the name of the protagonist.

To promote the film, the Tokyo Metro had a special marking on its trains going from Ueno to Nakano-fujimichō on the Tokyo Metro Marunouchi Line. On the opening of this special line, actress Rina Akiyama greeted 200 fans who rode on the first train.

== Episode Red ==
The first of these films is Episode Red: Zero no Star Twinkle (EPISODE RED ゼロのスタートウィンクル, Episōdo Reddo Zero no Sutā Towinkuru; "Zero's Star Twinkle"). The catchphrase for the movie is "Crossing time, fighting for love." (時空を超えて―愛のための戦い。, Jikū o koete - Ai no tame no tatakai.). It is described as a slasher and it focuses on Kamen Rider Zeronos, particularly his red Zero Form. The story is that of the younger Yuto Sakurai and Airi Nogami, his older self's wife, and the circumstances behind their relation. It premiered in theaters on May 22, 2010. A vinyl Deneb toy is to be released as a special gift for the film. Yuichi Nakamura reprises his role as Yuto Sakurai and Wakana Matsumoto reprises as her role as Airi Nogami in this film.

=== Plot ===
After a review of the love between Yuto Sakurai and Airi Nogami, with the man sacrificing his existence to help his past incarnation act as Kamen Rider Zeronos in order to protect both Airi and time itself, scene opens to Airi and Ryotaro are renovating the Milk Dipper. Seigi Ozaki and Issē Miura arrive while Ryotaro is suddenly possessed by Momotaros who spirits him off while telling him that the DenLiner has been hijacked by an Imagin. But on the way, M-Ryotaro senses two thugs attacking Airi during her walk and arrives in time to beat them out of thinking they are in league with the Imagin, only to hear that a young man put them up to it. Seeing Yuto leaving the scene makes it more confusing as M-Ryotaro loses him before Urataros calls that the DenLiner stopped thanks to the manual brakes.

When Ryotaro gets to the DenLiner, he learns the card the Imagin put in the DenBird had no clear date and causes the train to travel anywhere within the month January 2010. Furthermore, as the Owner of the DenLiner reassures the passengers, the time train would eventually crash if the brakes fail. When Momotaro accuses Yuto of being behind it, Deneb appears from the passenger car to explain he engineered a kidnapping so Yuto can be with Airi. But the plan never occurred as Yuto kicked him out the ZeroLiner upon hearing the plan. When the DenLiner's brakes start to fail, the Owner sends Ryotaro and the Tarōs to anchor the train to May 2010 by tying it to a concrete block outside of the sands of time.

Back at the Milk Dipper, two thugs appear at the Milk Dipper to intimidate Airi, but Yuto appears just in time to save her. He is about to leave when Airi offers him sweet coffee. From outside, the mastermind of the two attacks, Hiroshi Kikuchi, fumes that his plan to save Airi failed as Piggies Imagin mocks him while reminding him if their a contract where Kikuchi is promised the chance to impress Airi and gain her love. Sensing the Imagin, Momotaros is unable to act as he hurt his back from working. Urataros possesses Ryotaro and finds the Piggies Imagin, fighting him as Den-O Rod Form before Deneb arrives for support as Piggies Imagin spirits Kikuchi. After Urataros, Ryotaro and Deneb return to the Milky Dipper as they find Yuto and Airi talking before the latter laments how she may never be with Sakurai as the former knows he wants to see her again. Deneb takes it hard before he meets up with Yuto to apologize before he gets a plan to fix everything while the Piggies Imagin plans his own scheme. Leaving for his time as the Owner measures everything in response to a call from the Station Master, Ryotaro leaves to find the ropes anchoring the DenLiner to May 2010 snapping, leaving the boy on his own to find the Imagin and contract holder.

The next day, with Ozaki and Miura acting as her bodyguards, Airi is taking a walk until the Piggies Imagin knocks them out and kidnaps her. Arriving to her aid, Ryotaro assumes Den-O Plate Form to save her, only to be easily defeated as Yuto becomes Zeronos Zero Form to fight the Piggies Imagin. But when the Imagin reveals he intends to kill Kikuchi if this scheme fails, Zeronos is forced to take a fall. However, unable to follow the plan, Kikuchi is forced to see Imagin throw Airi into the back of the truck and claims that his contract with Kikuchi is complete. However, unable to prove himself a hero, Kikuchi drives off with the Imagin jumping after him. Zeronos follows the truck in the ZeroLiner for some time before switching to the ZeroHorn while Ryotaro chases foolishly until he finds Momotaros dressed as a homeless man. Momotaros is overjoyed by this and hugs Ryotaro as Ryotaro comforts him. Momotaros reveals he jumped out of the DenLiner on January 12, 2010 and had been living under a bridge with some homeless people for four months. He also mentions how he first witnessed Kikuchi becoming enamored with Airi at the time before joining Ryotaro in his chase after the Imagin.

Still chasing the truck, assuming Vega Form, Zeronos uses ZeroLiner Naginata to knock the Piggies Imagin off of the truck as Ryotaro and Momotaros arrive and transform into Kamen Rider Den-O. By then, as Den-O Sword Form is outmatched with an attack to the back, the DenLiner is brought back under control by the KingLiner. With Urataros, Kintaros, and Ryutaros, Den-O transforms into Climax Form and uses his Extreme Slash to easily destroy the Piggies Imagin. Meanwhile, when the truck's brakes are no longer working and heading to a cliff, Zeronos transforms into Altair Form to save Airi, leaving Deneb on the ZeroHorn. With Airi in his arms, the two leap out of the truck as Deneb shoots at its tires to turn it onto its side before it reaches the cliff, saving Kikuchi as well while Airi comes to see Yuto looking over her. As Yuto takes Airi back to town, Deneb heads to the DenLiner as he laments failing Yuto in getting Airi's love as Ryotaro assures him that might be someday. Using the ZeroHorn to take Airi back to town, Yuto stops as they see the starry sky and Airi realizes that Yuto was the man she used to love.

== Episode Blue ==
The second film, Episode Blue: The Dispatched Imagin is Newtral (EPISODE BLUE 派遣イマジンはＮＥＷトラル, Episōdo Burū Haken Imajin wa Nyūtoraru) follows on June 5, featuring the blue-colored Kamen Rider New Den-O. The catchphrase for the movie is "Goodbye, friend!? At the end of the fight there will be..." (さよなら、相棒!? 戦いの先にあるものとは―。, Sayonara, aibō!? Tatakai no saki ni aru mono towa -.). The story is themed around "Friendship" and features Kotaro's and Teddy as their partnership is put to the test. The director Kenzō Maihara states that fans of the TV series will enjoy this part of the trilogy, and he also has intentions to turn New Den-O's story into a brand new Den-O television series. Dori Sakurada reprises his role as Kotaro Nogami in this film.

=== Plot ===
At the Time Terminal, the PA system announces to the patrons of the Time-Crossing Flea Market that a ticket thief has been appearing over the past few days, and that they should keep an eye out. The thief appears, defeating several security guards while getting several time tickets, including one dated for June 10, 2010. Arriving to the present, the thief is cause off caught by Ryotaro as he becomes Den-O Sword Form. During the fight, the thief is revealed to be the Mantis Imagin as she strikes Den-O's ankle to cripple him as DenLiner saves Den-O before his opponent could finish him off. With Momotaros and Ryotaro unable to continue, the Owner reassures the DenLiner crew that they still have hope as Sieg arrives. The Owner clarifies that Sieg is not the one he summoned, but Kotaro and Teddy who are investigating the crime scene at the Time Terminal. Before they leave, after saving Kotaro from numerous cases of bad luck, Teddy spots something in one of the Time Terminal's stands: a good luck necklace that has a pendant of two interlocked stars. Arriving to the DenLiner as it docks, Kotaro learn from the Owner that his contract with Teddy is complete as the contract, and now the Owner needs his assistance due to his special nature. Teddy reluctantly agrees, taking on the name "Aleksandrovic" to go with the change of contract. Kotaro leaves the DenLiner to continue after the Mantis Imagin, with no one to protect him from his bad luck.

Arriving to the Milk Dipper, Kotaro overhears Airi, Seigi Ozaki, and Issē Miura discussing about a girl named Miku Uehara who saw a doppelganger of herself. Kotaro has an elephant-costumed Kintaros arrives to Miku's house as he finds the girl with her grandmother and the "doppelganger", the latter with sand pouring from her body. By then, the Mantis Imagin decides to intervene by distracting Kotaro to drive him away from the family. After Kintaros possesses him to reduce the bad luck inflictions, Kotaro becomes New Den-O to fight the Mantis Imagin with Kintaros as the Kintaono axe. But the Kintaono is too heavy for New Den-O to wield as Mantis Imagin beats them before taking her leave.

Back on the DenLiner, while Kohana tends to Kotaro's injuries, the Owner orders "Aleksandrovic" to polish the special spoons they found. When Ryotaro asks about a way for Teddy to help Kotaro again, the Owner explains that any derailment from his current contract could destroy the Imagin. Though, Kotaro accepts as he decides to investigate the two Mikus, with Ryutaros possessing Kotaro in the process. Arriving at the grandmother's house, R-Kotaro discovers that the grandmother is testing the two Mikus to see which of the two is the real Miku by having both make asazuke. Though R-Kotaro points out that the second cannot be real due to the sand pouring from her, the grandmother explains that she will decide. After a tie from the cooking, the two Mikus play tennis. As Ryutaros goes off to play on his own, leaving him to realize that Teddy protected him from his bad luck and he took him for granted, Kotaro ponders what is going on until the Mantis Imagin deems the contract completed. Luckily, the DenLiner arrives in time pick up Kotaro and the second Miku and drop off Ryotaro who joins with Ryutaros to become Den-O Gun Form. While glad that the other girl is gone, Miku leaves to her grandmother's dismay.

On the DenLiner, the second Miku reveals that she is from the not too-distant future that came to spend her birthday with her grandmother before she dies. Her sad story reaches Kotaro and Teddy as Ryutaros is knocked back into the DenLiner, with Ryotaro at the Mantis Imagin's mercy. Seeing Teddy about to derail from his contact, Kotaro tells Miku he understands her plight before going off with Urataros, using him as the Uratazao rod to fight the Mantis Imagin. But the Mantis Imagin defeats New Den-O once more. On the DenLiner, as future Miku runs off after being told the consequences of her contract, Teddy leaves as well as he would rather protect Kotaro even if he may disappear forever. Saving Kotaro from the Mantis Imagin on the New DenBird as future Miku returns to her grandmother's house, Teddy and Kotaro admit their bonds of friendship before transforming into New Den-O and the Macheteddy and together they fight the Mantis Imagin in the moonlight, finally beating the Imagin before destroying her with his Counter Slash.

Soon after, Teddy fades from existence as he gives Kotaro the good luck pendant he bought to symbolize their friendship, only for Kotaro realize it to be a love charm. While that occurs, future Miku spends her time with her grandmother who assures her the future would not be bleak after knowing her true nature. Returning to her time, August 25, 2010, Miku finds a note from her grandmother thanking her for the memories she gave her as the wind chime Miku got for her birthday jingles in the background. Back on the DenLiner, everyone is saddened as the Owner arrives with a new Imagin partner for Kotaro: "Aleksandrovic". With the others shocked, the Owner reveals Kotaro's friendship with Teddy saved him and restored their contract. Though the others were confused by the whole point of the Owner's actions, along with Sieg's appearance, Kotaro believes it was to teach him a valuable lesson as he and Teddy are returned to their time.

== Episode Yellow ==
The final film is Episode Yellow: Treasure de End Pirates (EPISODE YELLOW お宝DEエンド・パイレーツ, Episōdo Ierō Otakara DE Endo Pairētsu; "Treasure of the End Pirates"). The catchphrase for the movie is "Traveling through worlds, a brilliant complete treasure!?" (世界を超えた―華麗にお宝コンプリート!?, Sekai o koeta - Karei ni otakara konpurīto!?). It was released on June 19; advertising for the film currently focuses on the cyan-colored Kamen Rider Diend who only has minor yellow accents on his suit and a yellow Diend Kamen Ride card. The story features Daiki Kaito traveling to the World of Den-O again, chased by Reiji Kurosaki as Kamen Rider G Den-O for his crimes against the timeline. Kimito Totani stated in his blog that he reprises his role as Daiki Kaito from Kamen Rider Decade for the film. Kamen Rider Diend's Complete Form appears in the film.

=== Plot ===
At night in Tokyo, a man jumps from building to building, leaving sparkly sand as he moves. Momotaros and the other Tarōs pursue him, with Momotaros thinking he met him before as the figure easily dispatches his pursuers. When Ryotaro arrives, the Spider Imagin possessing the man emerges, having completed the contract with the boy's appearance. Ryotaro uses a Rider Ticket on the man, chasing the Imagin to November 22, 2008, with Den-O Sword Form quickly taking the Spider Imagin out. As Momotaros and the others look around for the Rider Pass he tossed aside while performing the finishing attack, they see the possessed man from before holding it, revealing that he used the Spider Imagin to possess him so he could hijack the DenLiner as Momotaros remembers who this man is: "that robber rider" Daiki Kaito. Stranding Ryotaro and the Tarōs in 2008, Daiki holds the Owner and Naomi at gunpoint as the Owner reveals his plans to steal time failed as the DenLiner can only go to the date on the ticket as it was a strong memory that keeps it from fading. Realizing that there is a treasure nearby, Daiki runs off to find it.

Seeing the DenLiner over the distance, Ryotaro and the Tarōs chase after it until Ryotaro sees Daiki running off in another direction. He finds Daiki confronting his past self, shooting him dead to Ryotaro's shock. However, past Daiki's wound heals as he runs off with Daiki shooting him more. Soon as the Tarōs arrive, a man suddenly appears from another point in time with a golden revolver trained on Daiki, Officer Reiji Kurosaki. He has come to arrest Daiki for threatening to cause a time paradox before transforming into Kamen Rider G Den-O as Daiki responds by becoming Kamen Rider Diend. Ryotaro and the Taros watch G Den-O as he overwhelms Diend with his advanced arsenal and the intelligence of the artificial Imagin Eve before arresting him. However, with the Time Police taking over, G Den-O arrests the Tarōs on the charge of altering time and deporting Ryotaro to his time. Only Urataros escapes long enough to witness past Daiki stealing a briefcase from the Kurosaki estate, pushing aside a young boy who got in his way, before G Den-O finds him. Back in the present time, as Issē and Ozaki look at the drawing Ryotaro made of their family, Ryotaro talks to Kohana of what Urataros told him prior to his arrest. Overhearing their talk, Ozaki remembers that a theft occurred at the Kurosaki estate on that date: someone broke in and stole the family's golden gun. But it leaves the question: why did Daiki go to that moment of his past?

At the Time Police's jail, the Imagin try to talk their way out as Daiki complains about their nosy racket as Urataros reveals he knows about his robbery. By then, Kurosaki arrives with two guards, ignoring the Taros while telling him they will be judged while phrasing what Urataros heard Daiki tell a young boy in the past. By then, the Owner appears to bail the Taros before being arrested as an accomplice with the DenLiner now Time Police property as Daiki manages to grab one of the guards, faking a wish to give up his life of crime to sneak the keys off of the man and using them to free himself, throwing the keys to the Imagin a bit out of reach. After failed attempts to get the keys, they find that Ryotaro and Kohana have been arrested as well and put into the cell next to the Tarōs who are still trying to reach the keys. Ryotaro beckons for Momotaros to come closer, which Momotaros realizes what is being said as he possesses the boy, beating the guards with Kohana as she lets everyone free. Ryotaro says they still have to get to the DenLiner, and the Owner gives him an Infinity Ticket to solve the mystery while he has a meeting with the Station Master.

On the DenLiner, Naomi arrives to tell Kurosaki that Daiki has escaped. However, Kurosaki senses something off and aims his damaged golden gun at "Naomi," revealing her to be Daiki. Daiki then takes of his Naomi disguise as he is forced off the DenLiner at gunpoint and clearance to execute. Daiki attempts to distract Kurosaki by pointing that Ryotaro and company are behind him as the DenLiner crew takes control of the DenLiner once more and returns to November 22, 2008. Daiki has used the DienDriver to latch onto the back of the DenLiner, traveling with them as Eve deems them all suitable for execution. Diend manages to get to the DenLiner's cockpit and holds Den-O at gunpoint, forced to explain that the purpose of his time trip was to undo the chain of events that left the gun damaged while Daiki was distracted by several letters hidden in the box so he can steal it in mint condition. Though the others refuse to help, Ryotaro decides to help Daiki with Urataros backing it up. Arriving at November 22, 2008, the group is ambushed by G Den-O as Den-O holds him off in his Ax and Gun Forms before Momotaros takes over the fight.

With Urataros possessing him to save him, Daiki transforms into Diend and uses the UraRod to deflect bullets back before using the Invisible Attack Ride Card to catch G Den-O off guard. By them, Daiki manages to make it to where his past self is before the gun is damaged, though Kurosaki appears. Before Daiki can get to his DienDriver once more, Kurosaki shoots him with the golden gun. The bullet goes through Daiki and hits the case the past Daiki is carrying, knocking it out of his hands, sending the papers within flying as Daiki gets the golden gun. Enraged that he was used, losing his golden gun as time has been altered so that it was never damaged and possessed by Daiki, Kurosaki stopped when he noticed the letters from the box. Daiki and Kohana reveal the letters to all to be from his mother, with the latter revealing to Kurosaki that his mother did love him and wishes to see him. Though Kurosaki feels he cannot let go of his hate, Daiki tells him that the letters should be his treasure. Eve hears this and becomes extremely enraged that Kurosaki refuses to give in to his hateful desires and, in turn, perform the final judgement that Eve desires. Declaring that humans can no longer be trusted, Eve takes matters into his own hands and transforms into G Den-O, promising to end all life on Earth that he deems illogical.

As everyone tries to escape from the artificial G Den-O, Daiki runs into his past self and asks for his aid against G Den-O. Both transform and past Diend steals the golden gun as he falls back. Den-O arrives to support Diend with the others. Den-O's four main forms are easily overpowered by G Den-O until Den-O assumes Climax Form. Kurosaki then arrives and Diend saves him from a stray shot. As Kurosaki holds the letters, he wonders if he can ever truly trust people, to which Diend tells him that as long as he believes in his dream, he will someday. As a personal act of gratitude towards Diend for opening his eyes to what truly matters in life, Kurosaki presents him with a special blue-colored K-Touch, which he soon uses to become Diend Complete Form. He then uses the Attack Ride Gekijouban Card to summon Kamen Riders G4, Ryuga, Orga, Glaive, Kabuki, Caucasus, Arc, and Skull, and, as a group with Den-O Climax Form, use their final attacks to finally put G Den-O (Eve) out of his misery once and for all.

In the end, before entering the Hikari Photo Studio, Daiki thanks Ryotaro and Kohana for their help as Kurosaki goes to visit his mother at a flower shop, wanting to talk to her as he learns that she truly cared for him. On the DenLiner, as the others are perplexed as the Owner arrives with the Station Master as they start a contest where they are flicking balls of fried rice at plates at distances with the Owner using the spoons from Episode Blue used as a golf club while they measure the distance with the tape from Episode Red. Soon after, Naomi serves everyone coffee as Ryotaro's regular mug is missing, realizing that Daiki must have taken it. Back at the photo studio, though he believes that would be their last meeting, Daiki would never forget Kamen Rider Den-O.

== Kamen Rider G Den-O ==
The only new Kamen Rider that appears in the Cho-Den-O Trilogy films is Kamen Rider G Den-O (仮面ライダーＧ電王, Kamen Raidā Jī Den'ō). Reiji Kurosaki (黒崎 レイジ, Kurosaki Reiji; portrayed by Yūta Furukawa) is a member of a space-time police force called the G Men (Ｇメン, Jī Men). By using the artificial Doberman Pinscher Imagin Eve (イブ, Ibu; voiced by Hiroki Takahashi) trapped in a Rider Pass (ライダーパス, Raidā Pasu) and the G Den-O Belt (Gデンオウベルト, Jī Den'ō Beruto), Kurosaki is able to transform into G Den-O. G Den-O is thematically based on an American police car. G Den-O is able to create a barrier and do time-travel without using a time train. Like Den-O and New Den-O, G Den-O is armed with a DenGasher (デンガッシャー, Dengasshā), which he primarily uses in either Gun Mode (ガンモード, Gan Mōdo) or the new Jitte Mode (十手モード, Jitte Mōdo). G Den-O's Full Charge attack is the World Punish (ワールドパニッシュ, Wārudo Panisshu), and when it is activated, Eve proclaims "Perfect Weapon!", shortly before a barrier encompasses G Den-O so he can attack with a series of shots from Gun Mode while the red and blue lights on his Den-Kamen light up. G Den-O's Full Charge attack using Jutte Mode called the World End (ワールドエンド, Wārudo Endo) was not used in the movie. He is ultimately destroyed by the combined efforts of Kamen Rider Diend Complete Form (with Kamen Riders G4, Ryuga, Orga, Glaive, Kabuki, Caucasus, Arc and Skull) and Kamen Rider Den-O Climax Form.

== Cast ==
All films' cast

- Ryotaro Nogami (野上 良太郎, Nogami Ryōtarō): Takuya Mizoguchi (溝口 琢矢, Mizoguchi Takuya)
- Kohana (コハナ, Kohana): Tamaki Matsumoto (松元 環季, Matsumoto Tamaki)
- Airi Nogami (野上 愛理, Nogami Airi): Wakana Matsumoto (松本 若菜, Matsumoto Wakana)
- Naomi (ナオミ): Rina Akiyama (秋山 莉奈, Akiyama Rina)
- Seigi Ozaki (尾崎 正義, Ozaki Seigi): Akira Nagata (永田 彬, Nagata Akira) of RUN&GUN
- Issē Miura (三浦 イッセー, Miura Issē): Ryo Ueno (上野 亮, Ueno Ryō)
- Owner/Station Master (オーナー／駅長, Ōnā/Ekichō): Kenjirō Ishimaru (石丸 謙二郎, Ishimaru Kenjirō)

Episode Red cast

- Yuto Sakurai (桜井 侑斗, Sakurai Yūto): Yuichi Nakamura (中村 優一, Nakamura Yūichi)
- Hiroshi Kikuchi (菊地 宏, Kikuchi Hiroshi): Hideo Nakaizumi (中泉 英雄, Nakaizumi Hideo)
- Yuto Sakurai (Adult): Tomonobu Okano (岡野 友信, Okano Tomonobu)

Episode Blue cast

- Kotaro Nogami (野上 幸太郎, Nogami Kōtarō): Dori Sakurada (桜田 通, Sakurada Dōri)
- Miku Uehara (上原 美来, Uehara Miku): Yuko Takayama (高山 侑子, Takayama Yūko)
- Sanae Uehara (上原 早苗, Uehara Sanae): Reiko Kusamura (草村 礼子, Kusamura Reiko)

Episode Yellow cast

- Daiki Kaito (海東 大樹, Kaitō Daiki): Kimito Totani (戸谷 公人, Totani Kimito)
- Reiji Kurosaki (黒崎 レイジ, Kurosaki Reiji): Yūta Furukawa (古川 雄大, Furukawa Yūta)
- Sayuri Mizushima (水島 さゆり, Mizushima Sayuri): Urara Awata (粟田 麗, Awata Urara)

=== Voice actors ===
All films' cast

- Momotaros (モモタロス, Momotarosu): Toshihiko Seki (関 俊彦, Seki Toshihiko)
- Urataros (ウラタロス, Uratarosu): Kōji Yusa (遊佐 浩二, Yusa Kōji)
- Kintaros (キンタロス, Kintarosu): Masaki Terasoma (てらそま まさき, Terasoma Masaki)
- Ryutaros (リュウタロス, Ryūtarosu): Kenichi Suzumura (鈴村 健一, Suzumura Ken'ichi)

Episode Red cast

- Deneb (デネブ, Denebu): Hōchū Ōtsuka (大塚 芳忠, Ōtsuka Hōchū)
- Piggies Imagin (ピギーズイマジン, Pigīzu Imajin): Kazuya Nakai (中井 和哉, Nakai Kazuya), Kōsuke Toriumi (鳥海 浩輔, Toriumi Kōsuke), Tetsuya Kakihara (柿原 徹也, Kakihara Tetsuya)

Episode Blue cast

- Sieg (ジーク, Jīku): Shin-ichiro Miki (三木 眞一郎, Miki Shin'ichirō)
- Teddy (テディ, Tedi): Daisuke Ono (小野 大輔, Ono Daisuke)
- Mantis Imagin (マンティスマジン, Mantisu Imajin): Michie Tomizawa (富沢 美智恵, Tomizawa Michie)

Episode Yellow cast

- Eve (イブ, Ibu): Hiroki Takahashi (高橋 広樹, Takahashi Hiroki)
- Spider Imagin (スパイダーイマジン, Supaidā Imajin): Akira Sasanuma (笹沼 尭羅, Sasanuma Akira)
- DienDriver Voice, K-Touch Voice: Mark Okita (マーク 大喜多, Māku Ōkita)

== Music ==
Episode Red theme

- "Action-Zero 2010"
  - Lyrics: Shoko Fujibayashi
  - Composition: LOVE+HATE & Shuhei Naruse
  - Arrangement: Shuhei Naruse
  - Artist: Yuto Sakurai & Deneb (Yuichi Nakamura & Hōchū Ōtsuka)

Episode Blue theme

- "Double-Action Strike form"
  - Lyrics: Shoko Fujibayashi
  - Composition: LOVE+HATE & Ryo (of defspiral)
  - Arrangement: Ryo (of defspiral)
  - Artist: Kotaro Nogami & Teddy (Dori Sakurada & Daisuke Ono)

Episode Yellow theme

- "Climax-Action ~The Den-O History~" (Climax-Action ～The 電王 History～)
  - Lyrics: Shoko Fujibayashi
  - Composition: Shuhei Narusei & LOVE+HATE
  - Arrangement: LOVE+HATE
  "Climax-Action ~The Den-O History~" is a medley of all of the "Climax Jump" and "Double-Action" variations, as well as "Action-ZERO" and "Real-Action", composed for the TV series. It does not have a specified artist.

In addition to these three singles, the Cho-Den-O Trilogy: Original Soundtrack (超電王トリロジー ORIGINAL SOUNDTRACK, Chō Den'ō Torirojī Orijinaru Saundotorakku) was released on May 26, 2010, and the Kamen Rider Den-O Super CD Box Set (仮面ライダー電王 超CD-BOX, Kamen Raidā Den'ō Chō Shī Dī Bokkusu) consisting of 20 CDs and 2 DVDs, amassing a total of 350 songs, is scheduled for release on July 28, 2010, including the new song "Climax Jump for U".
