= Yuriko Shiratori =

Japanese idol

Yuriko Shiratori (白鳥 百合子, Shiratori Yuriko; born April 29, 1983 in Sendai) is a retired Japanese gravure idol, tarento artist, and actress formerly affiliated with A-Team Entertainment Production Agency.

== Career ==
=== Early career ===
Shiratori graduated from Sendai Vocational School in April 2004 and moved to Tokyo, hoping to become an actress. There she began to work part-time jobs at sport shops, supermarkets, and video rental stores. In between these jobs, she managed to get small roles in plays and work as an event assistant. She also started taking acting and sword fighting lessons two or three times a week..

On January 11, 2006, she began a blog in which she chronicled her journey towards becoming an idol. She started attending auditions in February 2006, and was awarded the Grand Prize for the A-Team Crystal Pure Audition, and as a result, enrolled in the agency. She started off as a gravure model, and also made her first television appearance soon after. Furthermore, she released her first DVD in the fall of 2006, and began to appear as a model in the weekly tabloid magazine, Shūkanshi and also the internet magazine, Fashion Walker.

=== Kamen Rider ===
On January 8, 2007, She was featured on Tohoku Broadcasting Company's Evening News TBC show and also interviewed on the Jaikeru Makuson variety program (named after the way the producer's mother said Michael Jackson's name). She was then cast as the main heroine of the Toei tokusatsu drama, Kamen Rider Den-O. However, she dropped out in July of that year, around the halfway point of the show, due to declining health caused by overwork, with her character having to be rewritten and recast. On February 3, She held a public event to commemorate the release of her second DVD "Face", with an attendance of approximately 220 people, including prominent names in the idol industry.

She played a small role as a hostess in the movie, Yakuza: Like a Dragon, based on the 2005 PlayStation 2 video game, Yakuza. The movie was released on March 3, 2007, and she continued performing as a gravure model for the next year.

=== Retirement ===
In February 2008, Shiratori announced on her blog that she was no longer with her agency, A-Team. She mentioned that she was not ready for the reality of the entertainment world, vaguely hinting that there may have been conflict with her agency and was dismissed.

She formally announced her retirement from the entertainment industry on February 1, 2013. Her last blog post was celebrating the New Year 2013 and has not updated it since.

== Post-Retirement ==
In 2017, a written interview with Shiratori was released with the Kamen Rider Den-O Blu-ray Box Set 3, which was a part of the 10th anniversary celebration. In that interview, she remarked and reminisced of her experience of being a part of the show.
