= Akira Nagata =

Japanese singer, actor, and voice actor (born 1985)

- 永田 彬
- Born: January 22, 1985 (age 41); Sakai, Osaka, Japan
- Occupations: Singer; actor; voice actor
- Years active: 2001-present
- Agent: Yoshimoto Kogyo
- Notable credits: Kamen Rider Den-O as Seigi Ōzaki; Lovely Complex as Atsushi Otani
- Musical career
- Genres: J-pop
- Instrument: Vocals
- Label: Avex Trax
- Website: www.runandgun.jp

Akira Nagata (永田 彬, Nagata Akira; born January 22, 1985) is a Japanese singer and actor. He is a member of the boy band Run&Gun. He was part of the casts of Musical Air Gear with his fellow band members, a voice actor for Lovely Complex, and he also portrays Seigi Ozaki in the tokusatsu franchise Kamen Rider Den-O.

== Filmography ==
=== Movie ===
- Route 58 (2003)

=== Anime ===
- Lovely Complex (2007) – Atsushi Ōtani
- Hatara Kids: My Ham Gumi – Steve

=== TV Drama ===
- Kamen Rider Den-O (2007) – Seigi Ozaki
- Tomorrow (2008) – Kato Keito
- Hammer Session! (2010) – Tsukamoto Tetsuya

=== Stage ===
- Macbeth (Musical Air Gear) (2007/01, Tokyo + Osaka)
- Macbeth (Musical Air Gear vs. Bacchus Super Range Remix) (2007/05, Tokyo)
- RUN&GUN stage: Blue sheets (2008/01 Tokyo + Osaka) – Nagai
- RUN&GUN stage 2: Yoosoro (2008/10)
