= Wakana Matsumoto =

Japanese actress

- 松本 若菜
- Born: February 25, 1984 (age 42); Tottori Prefecture, Japan
- Occupation: Actress
- Years active: 2007–present
- Notable credit: Kamen Rider Den-O as Airi Nogami

Wakana Matsumoto (松本 若菜, Matsumoto Wakana; born February 25, 1984) is a Japanese actress from Tottori Prefecture. She portrayed Airi Nogami in the tokusatsu drama Kamen Rider Den-O.

== Career ==
On March 9, 2006, at the age of 22, she moved from Tottori Prefecture to Tokyo. She successfully passed her first audition.

=== Philanthropy ===
In 2023, she decided to appear in the film Minna Ikiteru: Second Birthday to promote bone marrow donor registration and increase public understanding of the cause.

== Filmography ==
=== Films ===
- My Girlfriend's a Geek (2009), Yoriko
- Kamen Rider × Kamen Rider × Kamen Rider The Movie: Cho-Den-O Trilogy (2010)
- Pecoross' Mother and Her Days (2013)
- Gonin Saga (2015)
- Dear Deer (2015)
- Kakekomi (2015), Otane
- A Cappella (2016)
- The Crawler In The Attic (2016)
- Carenin (2017), Natsumi Satō
- Gukoroku: Traces of Sin (2017)
- Marriage (2017), Mana Yoshioka
- Cafe Funiculi Funicula (2018), Nagare Tokita
- Meeting Pinkerton (2018), Aoi Nakagawa
- This Old Road: Konomichi (2019), Toshiko Matsushita
- Peer (2019), Natsumi Satō
- The Flowers of Evil (2019)
- His (2020)
- Love and the Grand Tug-of-war (2021)
- Pornographer: Playback (2021)
- The Blue Skies at Your Feet (2022)
- Marriage Counselor (2023), Yui Tokita
- Minna Ikiteiru: Second Birthday (2023), Michiko Sakurai
- Renji Himuro (2023), Ryōko (voice)
- Cells at Work! (2024), Macrophage
- Muromachi Outsiders (2025), Ho-ōji
- The Honest Realtor: The Movie (2026), Maya Aihara
- Never Guilty (2026), Michiko Suzunari

=== Television ===
- Kamen Rider Den-O (2007), Airi Nogami
- Around 40 (2008)
- Keishicho Sosa Ikka 9 Gakari 4 (2009, ep 1)
- Untouchable (2009, ep 5)
- Detective Conan Season 1 (2011, ep 4)
- Kamen Rider Wizard (2012, ep 6-7)
- Legal High (2012, ep 3)
- Lucky Seven (2012, ep 1)
- Omoni Naitemasu (2012, ep 2)
- Tales of the Unusual: Spring 2012 (2012, ep 3 "Kazoku (Kari)")
- The Special Investigation (2014, ep3- 5)
- The Library Wars: Book of Memories (2015)
- My Family's Funeral (2017)
- Dr. Storks (2017), Emi Kurasaki
- We Are Rokets! (2018), Kyoko Urushido
- Zebra (2019), Yasuko Sudo
- Awaiting Kirin (2020), Odai no Kata
- May–December Couple (2020), Miyuki Nishimura
- My Housekeeper Nagisa-san (2020), Reika Hashio
- My Imaginary Meal to Be Praised (2021, ep8)
- Fishbowl Wives (2022), Hisako Taguchi
- Don't Call It Mystery (2022, ep11), Toake Nekota
- Mr. Grim Reaper 2 (2022, ep4)
- The Revenge Widow (2022), Mitsu Suzuki
- Modern Love Tokyo (2022, ep1)
- Involvement in Family Affairs (2022), Mihoko Miyama
- What Will You Do, Ieyasu? (2023), Lady Acha
- Hold My Hand at Twilight (2023), Makiko Isobe
- Scary Humans 2 (2023, ep4), Okuma
- The Honest Realtor 2 (2024), Maya Aihara
- Ms. Saionji Doesn't Do Housework (2024), Itsuki Saionji
- Dr. Ashura (2025), Shura Anno
- Passing the Reins (2025), Kanako Nozaki

=== Dubbing ===
- Jurassic World Rebirth (Zora Bennett (Scarlett Johansson))

== Awards and nominations ==
Year	Association	Award	Nominee/Work(s)	Result	Ref.
2018	39th Yokohama Film Festival	Best Supporting Actress	Gukoroku: Traces of Sin	Won	
2023	15th Tokyo Drama Awards	Best Supporting Actress	Involvement in Family Affairs	Won	
2025	49th Elan d'or Awards	Newcomer of the Year	Herself	Won	
