= Kamen Rider Den-O =

2007 Japanese television series

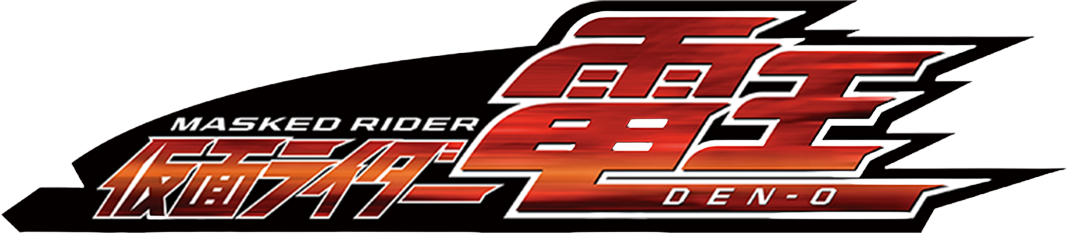
- Also known as: Masked Rider Den-O
- Genre: Tokusatsu; Superhero fiction; Science fantasy; Comedy
- Created by: Shotaro Ishinomori
- Written by: Yasuko Kobayashi (head)
- Directed by: Ryuta Tasaki
- Starring: Takeru Satoh; Yuriko Shiratori; Rina Akiyama; Kenjirō Ishimaru; Wakana Matsumoto; Akira Nagata; Ryo Ueno; Yūichi Nakamura; Tamaki Matsumoto; Hideo Ishiguro
- Voices of: Toshihiko Seki; Kōji Yusa; Masaki Terasoma; Kenichi Suzumura; Hōchū Ōtsuka
- Theme music composer: Shuhei Naruse
- Opening theme: "Climax Jump" by AAA Den-O form; "Climax Jump DEN-LINER form" by Momotaros, Urataros, Kintaros, & Ryutaros
- Composer: Toshihiko Sahashi
- Country of origin: Japan
- No. of episodes: 49 (list of episodes)

Production
- Producers: Atsushi Kaji (TV Asahi); Shinichiro Shirakura (Toei); Naomi Takebe (Toei)
- Running time: 20–25 minutes
- Production companies: TV Asahi; Toei Company; Asatsu-DK

Original release
- Network: ANN (TV Asahi)
- Release: January 28, 2007 – January 20, 2008

Related
- Kamen Rider Kabuto; Kamen Rider Kiva

Kamen Rider Den-O (仮面ライダー電王, Kamen Raidā Den'ō) is the 17th installment in the popular Kamen Rider Series of tokusatsu programs. It is a joint collaboration between Ishimori Productions and Toei. It premiered January 28, 2007 on TV Asahi, and concluded airing on January 20, 2008. Its lead actor Takeru Satoh is the first Kamen Rider Series lead born in the Heisei period of Japanese history. It aired on the Super Hero Time slot alongside Juken Sentai Gekiranger. The series revolves around time travel, trains, and personalities. It follows Ryotaro Nogami, an unlucky young man who becomes Kamen Rider Den-O with the help of time-traveling Imagin (spirits from the future). The show combines elements of comedy, action, and drama with a focus on time manipulation and the relationship between Ryotaro and the Imagin.

Along with the usual film adaptation that Heisei Kamen Rider series have released during the late summer of their broadcast run, Den-O had a second film released in the spring following its broadcast run which grossed 730 million yen (approximately US$6.8 million) and a series of ten OVA shorts, both of which are firsts for any Kamen Rider. Continuing the trend, Kamen Rider Den-O also had a third film released in October 2008, the first for any Kamen Rider series and a second series of 12 OVA shorts was released in November 2008. Takeru Satoh claims that the reason that Den-O has amassed such popularity is because of its comedic timing. A fourth film was released on May 1, 2009, and three more released in the summer of 2010.

== Synopsis ==
Ryotaro Nogami, a young man with a lot of bad luck, finds a strange pass and things got stranger from a mysterious girl and a large time-traveling train to being possessed by an entity called an Imagin, a beings from an alternate future whose kind are attempting to change the past. Though slightly confused about the nature of the crisis, Ryotaro, along with the aid of the hot-headed, violent Imagin, dubbed Momotaros, becomes Kamen Rider Den-O, traveling to different times on the DenLiner to battle the evil Imagin to prevent them from altering the past to affect the present and future. During his adventure, Ryotaro is joined by other Imagin who aid him as well; the lying, manipulating, and womanizing Urataros, the herculean (and narcoleptic) Kintaros, and the childish yet powerful Ryutaros. He later meets the mysterious Yuto Sakurai and his bumbling Imagin partner Deneb. Yuto is not only Kamen Rider Zeronos but is the younger incarnation of Ryotaro's older sister Airi's fiancé, Sakurai, who mysteriously disappeared and is tied to the mysteries involving the Imagin and a person known as the Junction Point.

== Imagin ==
Imagin (イマジン, Imajin) are creatures from the future who have come to the year 2007 in hopes of changing the past to alter the future that is their extinction. To reach this goal, Imagin grant the wishes of weak-hearted humans and then go back in time to that individual's most precious memory and begin to rampage there. When they lose control of their humanoid forms, Imagin grow into massive proportions known as Gigandeath.

== Episodes ==
No.	Title	Directed by	Written by	Original release date
1	"Here I Come!"; Transliteration: "Ore, Sanjō!" (Japanese: 俺、参上！)	Ryuta Tasaki	Yasuko Kobayashi	January 28, 2007
2	"Ride on Time"; Transliteration: "Raido On Taimu" (Japanese: ライド・オン・タイム)	Ryuta Tasaki	Yasuko Kobayashi	February 4, 2007
3	"Outlaw Momotarō"; Transliteration: "Autorō Momotarō" (Japanese: アウトロー・モモタロー)	Takao Nagaishi	Yasuko Kobayashi	February 11, 2007
4	"Get Out, Oni! I'm Serious"; Transliteration: "Oni wa Soto! Boku wa Maji" (Japanese: 鬼は外！僕はマジ)	Takao Nagaishi	Yasuko Kobayashi	February 18, 2007
5	"Will You Let Me Fish You?"; Transliteration: "Boku ni Tsuraretemiru?" (Japanese: 僕に釣られてみる？)	Taro Sakamoto	Yasuko Kobayashi	February 25, 2007
6	"A Swindler's Dignity"; Transliteration: "Sagishi no Hinkaku" (Japanese: サギ師の品格)	Taro Sakamoto	Yasuko Kobayashi	March 4, 2007
7	"Jealousy Bomber"; Transliteration: "Jerashī Bonbā" (Japanese: ジェラシー・ボンバー)	Hidenori Ishida	Yasuko Kobayashi	March 11, 2007
8	"Sad Melody, Loving Memory"; Transliteration: "Ai Merodī Ai Memorī" (Japanese: 哀メロディ・愛メモリー)	Hidenori Ishida	Yasuko Kobayashi	March 18, 2007
9	"You Wept Over My Strength"; Transliteration: "Ore no Tsuyosa ni Omae ga Naita" (Japanese: 俺の強さにお前が泣いた)	Takao Nagaishi	Yasuko Kobayashi	March 25, 2007
10	"Hana in a Stormy Singularity Point"; Transliteration: "Hana ni Arashi no Tokuiten" (Japanese: ハナに嵐の特異点)	Takao Nagaishi	Yasuko Kobayashi	April 1, 2007
11	"Madness, Delusion, Baby's Breath"; Transliteration: "Bōsō Mōsō Kasumisō" (Japanese: 暴走・妄想・カスミ草)	Taro Sakamoto	Shōji Yonemura	April 8, 2007
12	"Run Taros!"; Transliteration: "Hashire Tarosu!" (Japanese: 走れタロス！)	Taro Sakamoto	Shōji Yonemura	April 15, 2007
13	"Okay? Your Answer Doesn't Matter"; Transliteration: "Ii? Kotae wa Kiitenai" (Japanese: いい？答えは聞いてない)	Osamu Kaneda	Yasuko Kobayashi	April 22, 2007
14	"Dance With Dragon"; Transliteration: "Dansu Wizu Doragon" (Japanese: ダンス・ウィズ・ドラゴン)	Osamu Kaneda	Yasuko Kobayashi	April 29, 2007
15	"Bath Jack Panic"; Transliteration: "Basu Jakku Panikku" (Japanese: 銭湯(バス)ジャック・パニック)	Hidenori Ishida	Shōji Yonemura	May 6, 2007
16	"Star of Happiness, Criminal's Surrender"; Transliteration: "Kōfuku no Hoshi, Kōfuku no Hoshi" (Japanese: 幸福の星、降伏の犯人(ホシ))	Hidenori Ishida	Shōji Yonemura	May 13, 2007
17	"That Guy Just Now! Already in the Past?"; Transliteration: "Ano Hito wa Ima! Mo Kako?" (Japanese: あの人は今！も過去？)	Taro Sakamoto	Yasuko Kobayashi	May 20, 2007
18	"A Clockwork Fiance"; Transliteration: "Tokei Jikake no Fianse" (Japanese: 時計じかけの婚約者(フィアンセ))	Taro Sakamoto	Yasuko Kobayashi	May 27, 2007
19	"That Man, Zero's Start"; Transliteration: "Sono Otoko, Zero no Sutāto" (Japanese: その男、ゼロのスタート)	Kenzo Maihara	Yasuko Kobayashi	June 3, 2007
20	"Let Me Say This to Start"; Transliteration: "Saisho ni Itteoku" (Japanese: 最初に言っておく)	Kenzo Maihara	Yasuko Kobayashi	June 10, 2007
21	"Fighting Style"; Transliteration: "Kenka no Ryūgi" (Japanese: ケンカのリュウ儀)	Hidenori Ishida	Yasuko Kobayashi	June 24, 2007
22	"An Unspeakable Future"; Transliteration: "Hanasenai Mirai" (Japanese: ハナせない未来)	Hidenori Ishida	Yasuko Kobayashi	July 1, 2007
23	"Enter the Prince, Kneel Down to Him!"; Transliteration: "Ōji Kōrin, Zu ga Takai!" (Japanese: 王子降臨、頭が高い！)	Ryuta Tasaki	Yasuko Kobayashi	July 8, 2007
24	"The Prince's Goodbye Lullaby"; Transliteration: "Gubbai Ōji no Rarabai" (Japanese: グッバイ王子のララバイ)	Ryuta Tasaki	Yasuko Kobayashi	July 15, 2007
25	"Climax Double Jump"; Transliteration: "Kuraimakkusu Daburu Janpu" (Japanese: クライマックスWジャンプ)	Kenzo Maihara	Yasuko Kobayashi	July 22, 2007
26	"The Ticket to God's Line"; Transliteration: "Kami no Rosen e no Chiketto" (Japanese: 神の路線へのチケット)	Kenzo Maihara	Yasuko Kobayashi	July 29, 2007
27	"Schedule-Disrupting Fang"; Transliteration: "Daiya o Midasu Kiba" (Japanese: ダイヤを乱す牙)	Hidenori Ishida	Yasuko Kobayashi	August 5, 2007
28	"Too Lucky, Too Excited, Too Strange"; Transliteration: "Tsuki Sugi, Nori Sugi, Kawari Sugi" (Japanese: ツキすぎ、ノリすぎ、変わりすぎ)	Hidenori Ishida	Yasuko Kobayashi	August 12, 2007
29	"Lucky Horror Show"; Transliteration: "Rakkī Horā Shō" (Japanese: ラッキー・ホラー・ショー)	Naoki Tamura	Yasuko Kobayashi	August 19, 2007
30	"Madam, How About the Fireworks?"; Transliteration: "Okusan Hanabi Dō?" (Japanese: 奥さん花火どう？)	Naoki Tamura	Yasuko Kobayashi	August 26, 2007
31	"Ai Need Yu"; Transliteration: "Ai Nīdo Yū" (Japanese: 愛(アイ)・ニード・侑(ユウ))	Osamu Kaneda	Yasuko Kobayashi	September 2, 2007
32	"Last Train Card Zero!"; Transliteration: "Shūden Cādo Zero!" (Japanese: 終電カード・ゼロ！)	Osamu Kaneda	Yasuko Kobayashi	September 9, 2007
33	"Time Traveler Kohana"; Transliteration: "Taimu Toraburā Kohana" (Japanese: タイムトラブラー・コハナ)	Takao Nagaishi	Yasuko Kobayashi	September 16, 2007
34	"The Time Interval Pianist"; Transliteration: "Toki no Hazama no Pianisuto" (Japanese: 時の間(はざま)のピアニスト)	Takao Nagaishi	Yasuko Kobayashi	September 23, 2007
35	"Tragic Resurrection Card Zero"; Transliteration: "Higeki no Fukkatsu Kādo Zero" (Japanese: 悲劇の復活カード・ゼロ)	Kenzo Maihara	Yasuko Kobayashi	September 30, 2007
36	"No Possession, No Secession, Train Slash!"; Transliteration: "Tsukazu, Hanarezu, Densha Giri!" (Japanese: 憑かず、離れず、電車斬り！)	Kenzo Maihara	Yasuko Kobayashi	October 7, 2007
37	"I Have the Face for It, Don't I?"; Transliteration: "Ore, Sōiu Kao Shiteru daro?" (Japanese: 俺、そういう顔してるだろ？)	Ryuta Tasaki	Yasuko Kobayashi	October 14, 2007
38	"The King Train Within the Train Terminal"; Transliteration: "Densha no Naka no Denshaō" (Japanese: 電車の中の電車王)	Ryuta Tasaki	Yasuko Kobayashi	October 21, 2007
39	"The Rider Disappears as Well"; Transliteration: "Soshite Raidā mo Inakunaru" (Japanese: そしてライダーもいなくなる)	Naoki Tamura	Yasuko Kobayashi	October 28, 2007
40	"Change Imagin World"; Transliteration: "Chenji Imajin Wārudo" (Japanese: チェンジ・イマジン・ワールド)	Naoki Tamura	Yasuko Kobayashi	November 11, 2007
41	"Candy Scandal"; Transliteration: "Kyandi Sukyandaru" (Japanese: キャンディ・スキャンダル)	Hidenori Ishida	Yasuko Kobayashi	November 18, 2007
42	"Memory Update"; Transliteration: "Omoide Appudēto" (Japanese: 想い出アップデート)	Hidenori Ishida	Yasuko Kobayashi	November 25, 2007
43	"Something Missing"; Transliteration: "Samushingu Misshingu" (Japanese: サムシング・ミッシング)	Takayuki Shibasaki	Yasuko Kobayashi	December 2, 2007
44	"Resolution of a Single-Action"; Transliteration: "Ketsui no Shinguru Akushon" (Japanese: 決意のシングルアクション)	Takayuki Shibasaki	Yasuko Kobayashi	December 9, 2007
45	"Reliving a Blank Day"; Transliteration: "Yomigaeru Kūhaku no Ichinichi" (Japanese: 甦る空白の一日)	Kenzo Maihara	Yasuko Kobayashi	December 16, 2007
46	"Now to Reveal Love and Truth"; Transliteration: "Ima Akasu Ai to Kotowari" (Japanese: 今明かす愛と理(ことわり))	Kenzo Maihara	Yasuko Kobayashi	December 23, 2007
47	"You Wept Over My End"; Transliteration: "Ore no Saigo ni Omae ga Naita" (Japanese: 俺の最期にお前が泣いた)	Takao Nagaishi	Yasuko Kobayashi	January 6, 2008
48	"Opposite Goodbyes..."; Transliteration: "Urahara na Wakare..." (Japanese: ウラ腹な別れ・・・)	Takao Nagaishi	Yasuko Kobayashi	January 13, 2008
49 (Final)	"The Climax Goes on No Matter What"; Transliteration: "Kuraimakkusu wa Tsuzuku yo Dokomademo" (Japanese: クライマックスは続くよどこまでも)	Takao Nagaishi	Yasuko Kobayashi	January 20, 2008

== Films ==
A rarity for the Kamen Rider Series, Kamen Rider Den-O has had multiple theatrical releases, the most recent being a trilogy of films released on May 22, June 5, and June 19, 2010.

=== I'm Born! ===
Kamen Rider Den-O the Movie: I'm Born! (劇場版 仮面ライダー電王 俺、誕生！, Gekijōban Kamen Raidā Den'ō Ore, Tanjō!) premiered on August 4, 2007. This is the second Heisei era film in the Kamen Rider Series to be a part of the storyline of its television series since Kamen Rider Agito. The film features scenes from the birthing of Kamen Rider Den-O, Zeronos, and Gaoh. Alongside I am Born!, the Juken Sentai Gekiranger movie Juken Sentai Gekiranger: Nei-Nei! Hō-Hō! Hong Kong Decisive Battle was shown as a double feature. A short animated feature called Momotaros's Summer Vacation was shown along with the films, as well. The event of the movie took place between episode 27 and 28.

=== Climax Cop ===
A movie titled Kamen Rider Den-O & Kiva: Climax Deka (劇場版 仮面ライダー電王&キバ クライマックス刑事（デカ）, Gekijōban Kamen Raidā Den'ō Ando Kiba Kuraimakkusu Deka) appeared in theaters on April 12, 2008. It features a meeting between the characters of Den-O and the characters of Kamen Rider Kiva. The animated short Momotaros's Let's Go Kiva! (モモタロスのキバっていくぜ！, Momotarosu no Kibatte Ikuze!) was shown as a double feature. Climax Deka grossed 730 million yen in the box office and DVD sales.

=== Final Countdown ===
A third film adaptation of Kamen Rider Den-O titled Saraba Kamen Rider Den-O the Movie: Final Countdown (劇場版 さらば仮面ライダー電王 ファイナル・カウントダウン, Gekijōban Saraba Kamen Raidā Den'ō Fainaru Kauntodaun) was released in Japanese theaters on October 4, 2008. The film features characters such as Kamen Rider New Den-O (仮面ライダーNEW電王, Kamen Raidā Nyū Den'ō), Kamen Rider Yuuki (仮面ライダー幽汽, Kamen Raidā Yūki), the Imagin Teddy (テディ, Tedi), and the Ghost Imagin (ゴーストイマジン, Gōsuto Imajin), the Phantom Imagin (ファントムイマジン, Fantomu Imajin), and the Shadow Imagin (シャドウイマジン, Shadō Imajin). The animated short Imagin Anime: Be Forever Momotaros -Imagin Terminal Station-/The Movie (イマジンあにめ モモタロスよ永遠に －イマジン終着駅－／劇場版, Imajin Anime Momotarosu yo Towa ni -Imajin Shūchakueki-/Gekijōban) was shown as a double feature.

=== Cho-Den-O Series ===
Initially, a press release from Toei Company released on January 29, 2009, announced that there would be a fourth film for Kamen Rider Den-O. It was in production as of January 29, 2009, and was scheduled to be released in April 2009. On February 9, 2009, Toei revealed that this film was to be the first in the "Cho-Den-O" Series (「超・電王」シリーズ, "Chō Den'ō" Shirīzu), a new multimedia franchise featuring the cast and characters of Kamen Rider Den-O and its films.

==== The Onigashima Warship ====
The first of the films in this series is titled Cho Kamen Rider Den-O & Decade Neo Generations the Movie: The Onigashima Warship (劇場版 超・仮面ライダー電王&ディケイド NEOジェネレーションズ 鬼ヶ島の戦艦, Gekijōban Chō Kamen Raidā Den'ō Ando Dikeido Neo Jenerēshonzu Onigashima no Senkan), featuring the cast and characters of I'm Born!, Final Countdown, Kiva, and Kamen Rider Decade.

==== Cho-Den-O Trilogy ====
Kamen Rider × Kamen Rider × Kamen Rider the Movie: Cho-Den-O Trilogy (仮面ライダー×仮面ライダー×仮面ライダー THE MOVIE 超・電王トリロジー, Kamen Raidā × Kamen Raidā × Kamen Raidā Za Mūbī Chō Den'ō Torirojī) is the name given to a series of three films released in a four-week period between May 22 and June 19, 2010. The films, Episode Red, Blue, and Yellow, each focus on a different Kamen Rider's story. Episode Red is Kamen Rider Zeronos's chapter, and Yuichi Nakamura reprised his role for the film. Episode Blue is Kamen Rider New Den-O's chapter, and Dori Sakurada reprised his role for the film. Episode Yellow is Kamen Rider Diend's chapter, and Kimito Totani reprised his role for the film.

=== Let's Go Kamen Riders ===
OOO, Den-O, All Riders: Let's Go Kamen Riders (オーズ・電王・オールライダー レッツゴー仮面ライダー, Ōzu Den'ō Ōru Raidā Rettsu Gō Kamen Raidā), released on April 1, 2011, commemorated the 40th anniversary of the Kamen Rider Series featuring the cast and characters of Kamen Rider Den-O, Kamen Rider OOO, and other characters from the past franchise series.

=== Super Hero Taisen ===
Kamen Rider × Super Sentai: Super Hero Taisen (仮面ライダー×スーパー戦隊 スーパーヒーロー大戦, Kamen Raidā × Sūpā Sentai Sūpā Hīrō Taisen) is a film which features a crossover between the characters of the Kamen Rider and Super Sentai Series. The protagonists of Kamen Rider Decade and Kaizoku Sentai Gokaiger were featured, but the casts of Kamen Rider Fourze, Kamen Rider OOO, and Tokumei Sentai Go-Busters also participated. Rina Akiyama and Kenjirō Ishimaru had reprised their roles as Naomi and Owner, along with the Tarōs (Toshihiko Seki, Kōji Yusa, Masaki Terasoma and Kenichi Suzumura).

=== Super Hero Taisen GP ===
Super Hero Taisen GP: Kamen Rider 3 (スーパーヒーロー大戦GP 仮面ライダー3号, Supā Hīrō Taisen Guranpuri Kamen Raidā Sangō) is the 2015 entry of the "Super Hero Taisen" film series, featuring the cast of Kamen Rider Drive and the appearance of Kamen Rider 3, which was originally created by Shotaro Ishinomori for the one-shot 1972 manga Rider #3 VS. General Black (3ごうライダーたい ブラックしょうぐんのまき, Sangō Raidā Tai Burakku Shōgun no Maki). Yuichi Nakamura reprised his role in the film, which opened in theaters on March 21, 2015, followed by the TV special sequel Kamen Rider 4 (仮面ライダー4号, Kamen Raidā Yongō).

=== Ultra Super Hero Taisen ===
A crossover film, titled Kamen Rider × Super Sentai: Ultra Super Hero Taisen (仮面ライダー×スーパー戦隊 超スーパーヒーロー大戦, Kamen Raidā × Supā Sentai Chō Supā Hīrō Taisen) featuring the casts of Kamen Rider Ex-Aid, Amazon Riders, Uchu Sentai Kyuranger, and Doubutsu Sentai Zyuohger, was released in Japan on March 25, 2017. This movie also celebrates the 10th anniversary of Kamen Rider Den-O and features the spaceship Andor Genesis from the Xevious game, which is used by the movie's main antagonists, as well as introduces the movie-exclusive Kamen Rider True Brave, played by Kamen Rider Brave's actor Toshiki Seto from Kamen Rider Ex-Aid, and the villain Shocker Great Leader III, played by the singer Diamond Yukai. In addition, individual actors from older Kamen Rider and Super Sentai TV series, Ryohei Odai (Kamen Rider Ryuki), Gaku Matsumoto (Shuriken Sentai Ninninger), Atsushi Maruyama (Zyuden Sentai Kyoryuger), and Hiroya Matsumoto (Tokumei Sentai Go-Busters) reprise their respective roles.

=== Heisei Generations Forever ===
A Movie War film, titled Kamen Rider Heisei Generations Forever (仮面ライダー平成ジェネレーションズ FOREVER, Kamen Raidā Heisei Jenerēshonzu Fōebā) was released on December 22, 2018, featuring the casts of Kamen Rider Build and Kamen Rider Zi-O along with Kamen Rider Den-O.

=== 20th anniversary film ===
A 20th anniversary film for Den-O that has been tentatively titled Kamen Rider Den-O 20th (仮面ライダー電王 20th, Kamen Raidā Den'ō Nijusshūnen) is in production.

== Production ==
The Kamen Rider Den-O trademark was registered by Toei on November 10, 2006.

== Other visual media ==
=== Shin-chan special ===
Crayon Shin-chan aired a special episode on August 3, 2007, where Shin-chan meets Ryotaro, Hana, Naomi, the Owner, and Momotaros on the DenLiner. This special is titled "Crayon Shin-chan Midsummer Night: Here I Come! The Storm is Called Den-O vs. Shin-O 60 Minute Special!!" (クレヨンしんちゃん 真夏の夜にオラ参上！ 嵐を呼ぶ電王VSしん王 60分スペシャル！！, Kureyon Shinchan Manatsu no Yoru ni Ora Sanjō! Arashi o Yobu Den'ō Bui Esu Shin'ō Rokujuppun Supesharu!!).

In a later rerun of the special, Shin-chan and Nene meet up with Den-O, again, although to act as a teaser for the final episodes of Kamen Rider Den-O and to introduce Kamen Rider Kiva along with Ryotaro Nogami (Takeru Satoh) and Wataru Kurenai (Koji Seto). The live action Shin-chan also meets the cast of Juken Sentai Gekiranger for the teaser of their final episodes and later the cast of Engine Sentai Go-onger to air the trailer for their series.

The audio of Momotaros as Kamen Rider Den-O performing a finishing move is audible in the movie Jiro Dreams of Sushi.

=== Manga ===
A manga adaptation by Takayuki Sakai (坂井 孝行, Sakai Takayuki) appeared in the November 2007 issue of Shōgaku Ichinensei (小学一年生). It features a series of events involved with Hana's upcoming birthday and an evil Kamen Rider appearing with an army of Imagin at his disposal.

=== Hyper Battle DVD ===
Taking place between episodes 36 and 37, Kamen Rider Den-O: Singing, Dancing, Great Training!! (仮面ライダー電王 うたって、おどって、大とっくん!!, Kamen Raidā Den'ō Utatte, Odotte, Daitokkun!!) is a series of exercises that Ryotaro Nogami, Kohana, Momotaros, Urataros, Kintaros, Ryutaros, Deneb, and Sieg join in to get Ryotaro into shape so he can fight. But when the additional help (the Spider Imagin, the Wolf Imagin, and Ari the Anthopper Imagin) go rogue, Ryotaro becomes Kamen Rider Den-O Liner Form to use his training against the evil Imagin.

=== Imagin Anime ===
Animate in conjunction with Ishimori Productions, TV Asahi, ADK, and Toei, have produced a series of OVA shorts for Den-O titled Kamen Rider Den-O Collection DVD: Imagin Anime (仮面ライダー電王 コレクションDVD「イマジンあにめ」, Kamen Raidā Den'ō Korekushon Dī Bui Dī Imajin Anime) featuring super deformed versions of the main Imagin that have been used in Animate's products for the series. A second set of animated shorts called Imagin Anime 2 (イマジンあにめ2, Imajin Anime Tsū) was released for sale on November 22, 2008, including cameos by the Wolf and the Ghost Imagin. A third set of animated shorts called Imagin Anime 3 (イマジンあにめ3, Imajin Anime Surī) was to be released in December 2009, but has been pushed back to Spring 2010 and then again to October 21, 2010. This miniseries made more references to other Toei shows and included Ultraman Taro making a cameo appearance.

==== Shorts ====
===== Imagin Anime =====
1. Momotaros's Momotarō (モモタロスのももたろう, Momotarosu no Momotarō)
2. Urataros's Deceitful Vacation (ウラタロスのずるやすみ, Uratarosu no Zuru Yasumi)
3. Kin-chan's First Love (キンちゃんの初恋, Kin-chan no Hatsukoi)
4. Ryutarō's Secret (リュウタローのひみつ, Ryūtarō no Himitsu)
5. How is Deneb Candy Made? (デネブキャンディができるまで？, Denebu Kyandi ga Dekiru made?)
6. Maagi Magi Masieg (マージマジ・マジーク, Māji Maji Majīku)
7. Momotaros's Momotarō: Part 2 (モモタロスのももたろう・パート2, Momotarosu no Momotarō Pāto Tsū)
8. A Letter from Sis (お姉ちゃんからの手紙, Oneechan kara no Tegami)
9. Super Doctor Momo (スーパードクター・モモ, Sūpā Dokutā Momo)
10. Imagin Space Travel (イマジン宇宙旅行, Imajin Uchū Ryokō)

===== Imagin Anime 2 =====
11. Teru-teru Ryuta (てるてるリュウタ, Teruteru Ryūta)
12. Kin-chan's Tufts (キンちゃんのふっさり, Kin-chan no Fussari)
13. Momotaros' Flower Fortune Telling (モモタロスの花占い, Momotarosu no Hana Uranai)
14. Let's Decide Upon a Catchphrase (決めゼリフを考えよう, Kime Zerifu o Kangaeyō)
15. Ura-san is a Great Detective! (ウラさんは名探偵！, Urasan wa Meitantei!)
16. Best of Luck Wolf! (がんばれウルフ！, Ganbare Urufu!)
17. Imagin Mart (イマジンマート, Imajin Māto)
18. Sieg is Oookaaay (ジークはだいじょうぶだぁ, Jīku wa Daijōbu daa)
19. Stupid Momo vs. Nosy Woman (バカモモVSハナクソ女, Baka Momo Bāsasu Hanakuso Onna)
20. Document: The Bullet Train Rider (ドキュメント・ザ・電車ライダー, Dokyumento Za Densha Raidā)
21. Urashima Taro (ウラ島太郎, Urashima Tarō)
22. Be Forever Momotaros: Imagin Terminal Station (モモタロスよ永遠に ～イマジン終着駅, Momotarosu yo Towa ni ~Imajin Shūchakueki)

===== Imagin Anime 3 =====
23. Momotaros's Pudding Shop (モモタロスのプリン屋さん, Momotarosu no Purin'yasan)
24. Imagin in Wonderland (イマジン イン ワンダーランド, Imajin In Wandārando)
25. Google it! Kintarō (ぐぐれ！金太郎, Gugure! Kintarō)
26. I'm Contagious! (俺、伝染！, Ore, Densen!)
27. Kamen Rider Secret Room (仮面ライダー秘密部屋, Kamen Raidā Himitsu Beya)
28. Episode Red: Yuto's Life (EPISODE RED ユートの一生, Episōdo Reddo Yūto no Isshō)
29. Episode Blue: Teddy-san is a Great Detective (EPISODE BLUE テディさんは名探偵, Episōdo Burū Tedisan wa Meitantei)
30. Episode Yellow: Imagin Anime 3D (EPISODE YELLOW イマジンあにめ3D, Episōdo Ierō Imajin Anime Surī Dī)
31. Imagin Family Drifting Story (イマジン一家漂流記, Imajin Ikka Hyōryūki)
32. Ryutaros and an Autumn Flower (リュウタロスと秋の花, Ryūtarosu to Aki no Hana)
33. J-MEN's Pudding Shop (J-MENのプリン屋さん, Jei Men no Purin'yasan)
34. You Will Find the Ultra Planet (きみにも見えるウル○ラの星, Kimi ni mo Mieru Urutora no Hoshi)

=== Momotaros's King of the Castle in Burning Red ===
As a tie-in with Kamen Rider Kiva: King of the Castle in the Demon World, the Tarōs starred in a series of four short episodes called Momotaros's King of the Castle in Burning Red (モモタロスのまっかっか城の王, Momotarosu no Makkakka-jō no Ō), where they get into another crazy adventure as they take the Ginjiro out for a spin. The first three episodes are one minute long, airing from July 20 to August 3 after Kamen Rider Kiva, depicting the Taros in reviewing the Go-onger and Kiva movies before Ryutaros is kidnapped by Kamen Rider Rey. The fourth two-minute-long episode shown in theaters after Kamen Rider Kiva: King of the Castle in the Demon World and Engine Sentai Go-onger: Boom Boom! Bang Bang! GekijōBang!!, featured Ryutaros found by Momotaros as reenactments of the two movies by the Taros are played on the movie screen. Toshihiko Seki reprised his role as the Imagin Momotaros and Kōji Yusa, Masaki Terasoma, and Kenichi Suzumura also reprised their roles as Urataros, Kintaros, and Ryutaros, respectively. There was a "Burning Red Ver." (まっかっかVer., Makkakka Bājon) and a "Yellow Ver." (まっきっきVer., Makkikki Bājon) of the short film, shown at specific theaters based on the announcement that Saraba Kamen Rider Den-O: Final Countdown would be playing at that theater.

==== Mini episodes ====
1. The Castle in the Demon World Mystery is Solved! (魔界城の謎を解け！, Makaijō no Nazo o Toke!)
2. Samurai World's Warriors (サムライワールドの戦士, Samurai Wārudo no Senshi)
3. Fight! Kaijin Army (戦え！怪人軍団, Tatakae! Kaijin Gundan)
4. Momotaros's King of the Castle in Burning Red (モモタロスのまっかっか城の王, Momotarosu no Makkakkajō no Ō)

=== April 3, 1971 ===
The S.I.C. Hero Saga side story published in Monthly Hobby Japan magazine for Den-O is titled Masked Rider Den-O: April 3, 1971 (MASKED RIDER DEN-O -1971年4月3日-, Kamen Raidā Den'ō Sen Kyūhyaku Nanajū Ichi-nen Shigatsu Mikka). Running from December 2008 to October 2009, the story expands upon the events of Climax Deka and Kamen Rider Nega Den-O's travel through time joining forces with the Great Leader of Shocker, with Den-O and Zeronos joining forces with the original Shōwa Kamen Riders to fight them. It features original characters Negataros Spirit Form (ネガタロス精神体, Negatarosu Seishintai) and Negataros's form as Great Leader Rock (岩石大首領, Ganseki Daishuryō).

Chapter titles

1. Imagin Revival (復活のイマジン, Fukkatsu no Imajin)
2. Negataros Army (ネガタロス軍団, Negataros Gundan)
3. Shocker Leader (ショッカー首領, Shokkā Shuryō)
4. The Capture of Yuto Sakurai (囚われの桜井侑斗, Toraware no Sakurai Yūto)
5. Five Plus One (5+1, Go Tasu Ichi)
6. Comrade (仲間, Nakama)
7. True Form (正体, Shōtai)
8. Great Leader Rock (岩石大首領, Ganseki Daishuryō)
9. Seven Riders (7人ライダー, Shichinin Raidā)
10. Ten Riders (10人ライダー, Jūnin Raidā)
11. From the Window of the Den-Liner (デンライナーの車窓から, Denrainā no Shasō kara)

=== "DenLiner, Into Space!" ===
"Kamen Rider Kiva & Den-O: DenLiner, Into Space!" (仮面ライダーキバ&電王 デンライナー、宇宙へ！, Kamen Raidā Kiba Ando Den'ō Denrainā, Uchū e!) is a planetarium show using the cast of Kiva and Den-O to teach children about the universe. It was shown at the Kagoshima Municipal Science Hall's planetarium between January 2 and March 30, 2009.

=== Novels ===
- Novel: Kamen Rider Den-O: The Demon Dog of Tokyo World Tower (小説 仮面ライダー電王 東京ワールドタワーの魔犬, Shōsetsu Kamen Raidā Den'ō Tōkyō Wārudo Tawā no Maken), written by Shinichiro Shirakura, is part of a series of spin-off novel adaptions of the Heisei Era Kamen Riders. The novel was released on July 26, 2013.
- Novel: Kamen Rider Den-O: Deneb Kanjinchō (小説 仮面ライダー電王 デネブ勧進帳, Shōsetsu Kamen Raidā Den'ō Denebu Kanjinchō), written by Shinichiro Shirakura, is a spin-off novel. The novel was released on November 27, 2020.

=== Pretty Den-O Appears! ===
Kamen Rider Den-O: Pretty Den-O Appears! (仮面ライダー電王 プリティ電王とうじょう！, Kamen Raidā Den'ō Puriti Den'ō Tōjō!) was originally scheduled for release in Japan on April 24, 2020 as part of the Toei Manga Festival (東映まんがまつり, Tōei Manga Matsuri), but was later moved to August 14, 2020 due to the COVID-19 pandemic. The storyline took place in 1989 during Kamen Rider Black RX.

=== Parodies ===
Kamen Rider Den-O has been parodied and referenced in recent episodes of various anime.

- Part A of episode 169 of Sgt. Frog (ケロロ軍曹, Keroro Gunsō) was titled "Urere: King of the Trains" (ウレレ 電車の王様であります, Urere Densha no Ōsama de Arimasu) and featured the Keroro Platoon piloting various frog-themed bullet trains similar to the control of the DenLiner. The episode featured phrases such as "Here I come!" (僕、参上！, Boku, sanjō!), "I am from the start, at the climax" (僕は最初からクライマックスだよ, Boku wa saisho kara kuraimakkusu dayo), and "My finishing attack..." (僕の必殺技..., Boku no hissatsu waza...) spoken by Urere (Urere replaced Momotaros's boastful "Ore" (俺) with the more humble "Boku" (僕)). Urere is also voiced by Toshihiko Seki, who also provided the voice of Momotaros in Den-O. The phrase "It's good! It's great! It's awesome!" (いーじゃん！いーじゃん！スゲーじゃん？！, Ī jan! Ī jan! Sugē jan?!) is spoken by Giroro, as these are the lyrics of "Climax Jump", the opening theme song of Den-O. Keroro also re-enacts the opening sequence of Den-O on his "KeroLiner" (ケロライナー, Kerorainā).
- Episode 16 of Hayate the Combat Butler (ハヤテのごとく!, Hayate no Gotoku!) featured "guest" appearances of the DenGasher Sword, Rod, and Ax Modes as well as cameo appearances of the Owner, Momotaros, and Hana on a train very similar to the DenLiner Gouka.
- In episode 65 of Gintama, Okita uses Ryutaros' catchphrase "Is it okay if I beat you? Your answer doesn't matter!" (倒してもいい？答えは聞いてないけど！, Taoshite mo ii? Kotae wa kiitenai kedo!) and his eyes flash purple while battling Kagura. Episode 89 of Gintama also features this visual gag. Kenichi Suzumura, who voices Ryutaros in Den-O, voices Okita in Gintama.

== Cast ==
- Ryotaro Nogami (野上 良太郎, Nogami Ryōtarō): Takeru Satoh (佐藤 健, Satō Takeru)
- Hana (ハナ)/Kohana (コハナ): Yuriko Shiratori (白鳥 百合子, Shiratori Yuriko; Hana; 1–30), Tamaki Matsumoto (松元 環季, Matsumoto Tamaki; Kohana; 33–49)
- Yuto Sakurai (桜井 侑斗, Sakurai Yūto): Yūichi Nakamura (中村 優一, Nakamura Yūichi)
- Naomi (ナオミ): Rina Akiyama (秋山 莉奈, Akiyama Rina)
- Airi Nogami (野上 愛理, Nogami Airi): Wakana Matsumoto (松本 若菜, Matsumoto Wakana)
- Kai (カイ): Hideo Ishiguro (石黒 英雄, Ishiguro Hideo)
- Seigi Ozaki (尾崎 正義, Ozaki Seigi): Akira Nagata (永田 彬, Nagata Akira; of Run&Gun)
- Issē Miura (三浦 イッセー, Miura Issē): Ryo Ueno (上野 亮, Ueno Ryō)
- Past Man (過去の男, Kako no Otoko): Tomonobu Okano (岡野 友信, Okano Tomonobu)
- Owner (オーナー, Ōnā), Station Master (駅長, Ekichō): Kenjirō Ishimaru (石丸 謙二郎, Ishimaru Kenjirō)

=== Voice cast ===
For the portrayals of the Tarōs by Toshihiko Seki, Kōji Yusa, Masaki Terasoma, and Kenichi Suzumura, Kamen Rider Den-O was given the Synergy Award at the second Seiyu Awards.

- Momotaros (モモタロス, Momotarosu): Toshihiko Seki (関 俊彦, Seki Toshihiko)
- Urataros (ウラタロス, Uratarosu): Koji Yusa (遊佐 浩二, Yusa Kōji)
- Kintaros (キンタロス, Kintarosu): Masaki Terasoma (てらそま まさき, Terasoma Masaki)
- Ryutaros (リュウタロス, Ryūtarosu): Kenichi Suzumura (鈴村 健一, Suzumura Ken'ichi)
- Deneb (デネブ, Denebu): Hōchū Ōtsuka (大塚 芳忠, Ōtsuka Hōchū)

=== Guest cast ===
- Makoto (マコト; 1–2): Yuki Kimisawa (君沢 ユウキ, Kimisawa Yūki) (Credited under Yūichi Nakano (中野 雄一, Nakano Yūichi))
- Yū Yamagoshi (山越 佑, Yamagoshi Yū; 3–4): Kazuki Namioka (波岡 一喜, Namioka Kazuki)
- Daiki Saitō (斉藤 大輝, Saitō Daiki; 5–6): Yuki Ogoe (小越 勇輝, Ogoe Yūki)
- Yumi Saitō (斉藤 優美, Saitō Yumi; 7–8): Hitomi Kurihara (栗原 瞳, Kurihara Hitomi)
- Masaru Honjō (本条 勝, Honjō Masaru; 9–10): Kenta Uchino (内野 謙太, Uchino Kenta)
- Shūji Toyama (戸山 秀二, Toyama Shūji; 13–14): Shun Ueda (うえだ 峻, Ueda Shun)
- Shūjirō Hakamada (袴田 秀次郎, Hakamada Shūjirō; 15–16): Hayato Ōshiba (大柴 隼人, Ōshiba Hayato)
- Yuka Sawada (沢田 由香, Sawada Yuka; 17–18, 33): Hikari Mitsushima (満島 ひかり, Mitsushima Hikari)
- Akio Masuda (増田 明男, Masuda Akio; 23–24): Tsuyoshi Muro (ムロ ツヨシ, Muro Tsuyoshi)
- Sieg (ジーク, Jīku; Voice; 23–24, 49): Shin-ichiro Miki (三木 眞一郎, Miki Shin'ichirō)
- Gaoh (牙王, Gaō; 25-28): Hiroyuki Watanabe (渡辺 裕之, Watanabe Hiroyuki)
- Masashi Aoki (青木 雅史, Aoki Masashi; 25–26): Kōhei Yamamoto (山本 康平, Yamamoto Kōhei)
- Molech Imagin (モレクイマジン, Moreku Imajin; Voice; 27): Hidenori Tokuyama (徳山 秀典, Tokuyama Hidenori)
- Machida (町田; 29): Takuma Sugawara (菅原 卓磨, Sugawara Takuma)
- Tōru Terasaki (寺崎 トオル, Terasaki Tōru; 30): Tsuyoshi Hayashi (林 剛史, Hayashi Tsuyoshi)
- Piano Man (33–34): Taro Suwa (諏訪 太朗, Suwa Tarō)
- Yamaguchi (山口; 35–36): Yōichi Furuya (古屋 暢一, Furuya Yōichi)
- Leo Imagin (レオイマジン, Reo Imajin; Voice; 37–38): Kazuhiro Yamaji (山路 和弘, Yamaji Kazuhiro)

== Songs ==
The cover for the "Climax Jump" single featuring Kamen Rider Den-O Sword Form.

The initial songs for the series, opening theme "Climax Jump" and ending theme "Double-Action", had multiple rearrangements to be used for other characters that were featured in the series. For all information on musical releases for Kamen Rider Den-O, see Kamen Rider Den-O discography.

=== Opening themes ===
- "Climax Jump"
- "Climax Jump DEN-LINER form"

=== Insert themes ===
- "Double-Action"
- "Double-Action Rod form"
- "Double-Action Ax form"
- "Double-Action Gun form"
- "Action-ZERO"
- "Real-Action"
- "Double-Action Wing form"
- "Climax Jump HIPHOP ver."
- "Double-Action Piano form (1-4)"
- "Double-Action Coffee form"
- "Climax Jump Dark HIPHOP ver."

=== Other songs ===
- "Yume de Aeta Nara..." (夢で逢えたなら...; If We Met in a Dream...)
- "Double-Action GAOH form"
- "DEN-O VOCAL TRACKS LINER (C-J D-A nonstop re-connection)"
- "Action-ZERO Piano form"
- "Double-Action CLIMAX form"
- "Climax Jump the Final"
- "Cho Climax Jump" (超 Climax Jump, Chō Kuraimakkusu Janpu)
- "Action-ZERO 2010"
- "Double-Action Strike form"
- "Climax-Action ~The Den-O History~" (Climax Action ~The 電王 History~)

== See also ==
- Gamera the Brave
