= Climax Jump =

Single by AAA DEN-O Form

from the album Kamen Rider Den-O OST
- Released: March 21, 2007
- Genre: J-rock, alternative rock
- Length: 19:59
- Label: Avex Mode
- Composer(s): Shuhei Naruse
- Lyricist(s): Shoko Fujibayashi

AAA singles chronology
"Black&White" (2006)	"Climax Jump" (2007)	"Get Chu!/She no Jijitsu" (2007)

Kamen Rider Series theme song singles chronology
"One World" (2006)	"Climax Jump" (2007)	"Break the Chain" (2008)

"Climax Jump" is the 13th single by the Japanese group AAA, released by Avex Mode on March 21, 2007. The song was composed by Shuhei Naruse with the lyrics by Shoko Fujibayashi. The song is the first opening theme for the 2007 tokusatsu series Kamen Rider Den-O. For the release of the single, the band temporarily changed their name to AAA DEN-O Form for Den-O.

The single "Climax Jump" peaked at number 5 and charted for 45 weeks on the Oricon charts. On April 10, 2008, it was eventually certified Gold by the Recording Industry Association of Japan (RIAJ) for its physical shipment of 100,000 copies. It has been certified by the RIAJ as a platinum download, for being downloaded to cellphones more than 250,000 times.

This single is their highest-selling single as of 2011.

The song itself has received multiple covers and remixes by the show's cast and other franchise-affiliated bands, including Toshihiko Seki, Koji Yusa, Masaki Terasoma, and Kenichi Suzumura as their respective imagin' character.

== Track listing ==
1. "Climax Jump" - 4:05
2. "Climax Jump - Power Rock Edit" - 3:56
3. "Climax Jump - Sweet Ballad Edit" - 4:25
4. "Climax Jump - Soul Blues Edit" - 3:29
5. "Climax Jump (Instrumental)" - 4:04

== Oricon chart positions ==
Daily	Weekly	Sales
4	5	105,000
