= Masaki Terasoma =

Japanese actor (born 1962)

- てらそま まさき
- Born: May 8, 1962 (age 64); Nishinomiya, Hyōgo Prefecture, Japan
- Education: Toho Gakuen College of Drama and Music
- Occupations: Actor; voice actor
- Years active: 1984–present
- Agent: Mausu Promotion
- Children: 1

Masaki Terasoma (てらそま まさき or 寺杣 昌紀, Terasoma Masaki; born May 8, 1962) is a Japanese actor and voice actor. He is affiliated with Mausu Promotion.

== Biography ==
After graduating from Toho Gakuen College of Drama and Music, Terasoma joined Haiyuza Theatre Company. In 1984, he made his film debut in W's Tragedy. After that, he became a regular in films directed by Shinichiro Sawai, who took the megaphone for W's Tragedy, and Hiromichi Horikawa, whom he has known since high school, and is still active as a supporting actor in various dramas.

Currently, Terasoma is also active as a voice actor. His debut as the voice of Shadow Moon in 1987's Kamen Rider Black drew attention, but after that he did not have many voice acting roles except in tokusatsu dramas produced by Toei. It was not until 1999, when he left Haiyuza, that he began to do voice acting in earnest. He mainly dubbed Western movies, but has also appeared in anime and narration.

After working for Haiyuza Theatre Company and Office PSC, Terasoma has been affiliated with Mausu Promotion since 2003. The reason why he changed his stage name was because, "it would be better if it was easier to read" (since the character 'soma' (杣) was difficult to read). However, besides the voice-only appearances, he still uses the kanji spelling of his name.

== Filmography ==
=== Anime series ===
2002

- Tokyo Underground, Pyron

2003

- D.N.Angel, Kosuke Niwa

2004

- Inuyasha, Goryomaru
- Kyo kara Maoh!, Adalbert von Grantz
- Samurai Gun, Kaishuu Katsu
- Samurai 7, Kambei Shimada
- Phoenix, Yumihiko
- Madlax, McRae
- Yakitate!! Japan, Kawachi's Father

2005

- Gallery Fake, Akio Kikushima (episode 29)
- Negima! Magister Negi Magi, Eishun Konoe
- Tsubasa: Reservoir Chronicle, Grosum

2006

- Fist of the Blue Sky, Guang-Lin Pan
- Ape Escape, Pipotron J
- Tokko, Dr. Shiraishi
- Naruto, Renga
- Bartender, Kamishima's boss
- Black Lagoon: The Second Barrage, Russel
- Rakugo Tennyo Oyui, Hirakagenai

2007

- Oh! Edo Rocket, Tenten
- Kaze no Stigma, Juugo Kannagi
- Shigurui: Death Frenzy, Jingorou Higaki
- D.Gray-man, Vittorio
- Devil May Cry, Isaac
- Pokémon Mystery Dungeon: Explorers of Time and Darkness, Juputoru
- Moonlight Mile, Kuramochi

2008

- Gunslinger Girl: Il Teatrino, 2nd Section Chief Rorenfo
- Kyo kara Maoh! 3rd Series, Adalbert von Grantz
- Golgo 13, Bob Stigner
- The Tower of Druaga: The Aegis of Uruk, Kelb
- Naruto: Shippuden, Hidan
- Pokémon: Diamond & Pearl, Cilent
- Sands of Destruction, Rigolet

2009

- Slap Up Party: Arad Senki, Jigheart
- Inuyasha: The Final Act, Goryomaru (Ep. 1), Moryomaru
- Guin Saga, Vanon
- Sōten Kōro, Yuán Shào
- The Tower of Druaga: the Sword of Uruk, Kelb
- Fullmetal Alchemist: Brotherhood, Gertner, Yuriy Rockbell
- Pocket Monsters: Diamond & Pearl, Handsome
- Pokémon Mystery Dungeon: Toki to Yami o Meguru Saigo no Bōken, Juptile

2010

- The Book of Bantorra, Makia Dexiart
- Digimon Fusion, Knightmon
- Rainbow – Nisha Rokubō no Shichinin, Aritou

2011

- Un-Go, Jujirou Fuwa
- Wolverine, Tesshin Asano
- Steins;Gate, Yūgo Tennōji
- Digimon Xros Wars: The Young Hunters Who Leapt Through Time, Knightmon
- No. 6, Rikiga
- Pretty Rhythm Aurora Dream, Steven Jounouchi
- Pokémon: Black and White, Drayden
- Last Exile: Fam, The Silver Wing, Gunner Leader, Olaf
- One Piece, Caribou
- Beyblade: Metal Masters, Coach Steel

2012

- Sakamichi no Apollon, Kaoru's Father
- Smile Precure!, Daigo Hino
- Toriko, Midora
- Naruto Spin-Off: Rock Lee & His Ninja Pals, Hidan
- Haiyore! Nyaruko-san, Narrator

2013

- Gifū Dōdō!! Kanetsugu to Keiji, Kenshin Uesugi
- Attack on Titan, Petra's Father
- Hajime no Ippo: Rising, Kazuo Makunouchi
- Beast Saga, Wolfen
- Vividred Operation, Kenjirō Isshiki
- Brothers Conflict, Rintarō Hinata
- BlazBlue Alter Memory, Jubei
- Pokémon: Black and White: Rival Destinies, Handsome
- Log Horizon, Roderick

2014

- World Conquest Zvezda Plot, Man, Narrator
- Laughing Under the Clouds, Kiyotsuna Sasaki
- Fate/stay night: Unlimited Blade Works, Sōichirō Kuzuki
- Log Horizon 2, Roderick

2015

- Fafner in the Azure: -EXODUS-, Ian Kamp
- Fairy Tail, Torafusa
- Ushio and Tora, Kyōji Atsuzawa

2016

- Macross Delta, Gramia Nerich Windermere
- Tiger Mask W, Yuji Nagata

2017

- Mahojin Guru Guru, Monku (Eps. 6, 8, 11, 12, 24)

2018

- Golden Kamuy, Kiroranke
- Modest Heroes, Toto

2019

- Revisions, Ryōhei Kuroiwa
- Afterlost, Keigo
- Demon Slayer: Kimetsu no Yaiba, Saburo

2020

- Japan Sinks: 2020, Kōichirō Mutō
- The Misfit of Demon King Academy, Eugo La Raviaz
- Wandering Witch: The Journey of Elaina, Emil's Father

2021

- Dragon Goes House-Hunting, Catoblepas
- The Aquatope on White Sand, Akira Hoshino
- Irina: The Vampire Cosmonaut, Lieutenant Victor

2022

- Shinobi no Ittoki, Hoō Ban

2023

- Chillin' in My 30s After Getting Fired from the Demon King's Army, Granbaza
- In/Spectre 2nd Season, Kouya Fujinuma
- The Great Cleric, Granhart

2024

- The Weakest Tamer Began a Journey to Pick Up Trash, Seizerk

2025

- BanG Dream! Ave Mujica, Sadaharu Togawa
- Trillion Game, Sumeragi
- The Shiunji Family Children, Kaname Shiunji

2026

- Akane-banashi, Shiguma Arakawa
- Dara-san of Reiwa, Narrator
- Goodbye, Lara, Rowan

=== Original video animation ===
- Tsubasa Tokyo Revelations (2007), Fei Wong Reed
- Imagin Anime (2008), Kintaros
- Mobile Suit Gundam MS IGLOO 2: Gravity of the Battlefront (2008), Ben Barberry
- Strike Witches: Operation Victory Arrow, Vol. 2 – Aegean Umi no Megami (2015), Erwin Rommel

=== Original net animation ===
- Star Wars: Visions – The Duel (2021), Ronin

=== Anime films ===
- Ghost in the Shell 2: Innocence (2004), Azuma
- Dōbutsu no Mori (2006), Apollo
- Fafner in the Azure: Heaven and Earth (2010), Ian Camp
- Naruto the Movie: Blood Prison (2011), Mui
- The Princess and the Pilot (2011), Diego del Moral
- Naruto the Movie: Road to Ninja (2012), Hidan
- Your Name (2016), Toshiki Miyamizu
- Fate/stay night: Heaven's Feel (2017), Sōichirō Kuzuki
- Modest Heroes (2018), Toto
- Waka Okami wa Shōgakusei! (2018), Kōnosuke Minoda
- Mobile Suit Gundam Narrative (2018), Monaghan Bakharo
- Saga of Tanya the Evil: The Movie (2019), Jotuck Hofen
- Gold Kingdom and Water Kingdom (2023), Oduni
- My Hero Academia: You're Next (2024), Bruno Gorrini
- Batman Ninja vs. Yakuza League (TBA), Gordon

=== Tokusatsu ===
- Kamen Rider Black (1988), Shadow Moon (Eps. 35-51)
  - Kamen Rider Black: Terrifying! The Phantom House of Devil Pass (1988)
- Kamen Rider Black RX (1989), Shadow Moon (Ep. 22, 27)
- Tokkei Winspector (1990) Takeda (ep. 14) (actor)
- Chikyu Sentai Fiveman (1990), Condorgin (Ep. 5)
- Choujin Sentai Jetman (1991), Kyotarou Tatsumi (actor) (Ep. 8)
- Tokkyuu Shirei Solbrain (1991), Cross 8000 (voice), Ryūichi Takaoka (Eps. 34, 35, 40, 43, 51 – 53) (actor)
- Tokusou Exceedraft (1992), Narrator (Eps. 21 – 49 (Voiced by Yoshinari Torii (Eps. 1 – 14), Akira Murayama (Eps. 15 – 20))
- Kyōryū Sentai Zyuranger (1992), Guardian Beast Saber Tiger, Dora Narcissus (Ep. 32)
- Blue SWAT (1994), Gold Platinum (Eps. 23-51)
- Kamen Rider Den-O (2007) Kintaros/K Ryoutarou/Kamen Rider Den-O Ax Form, Climax Form
  - Kamen Rider Den-O: I'm Born! (2007) Kintaros/K Ryoutarou/Kamen Rider Den-O Ax Form
  - Kamen Rider Den-O & Kiva: Climax Deka (2008) Kintaros/K Ryoutarou/Kamen Rider Den-O Ax Form, Climax Form
  - Saraba Kamen Rider Den-O: Final Countdown (2008) Kintaros/Kamen Rider Den-O Ax Form, Climax Form
  - Kamen Rider Decade (2009) Kintaros/K Tsukasa/K Natsumi/Kamen Rider Den-O Ax Form
  - Cho Kamen Rider Den-O & Decade Neo Generations: The Onigashima Warship (2009) Kintaros/K Ryoutarou/Kamen Rider Den-O Ax Form, Cho Climax Form/K Riki/Kamen Rider Caucasus (Kintaros)
  - Kamen Rider × Kamen Rider × Kamen Rider The Movie: Cho-Den-O Trilogy (2010) Kintaros/K Koutarou/Kamen Rider Den-O Ax Form, Climax Form/Kinta Ono
  - OOO, Den-O, All Riders: Let's Go Kamen Riders (2011) Kintaros, Shadow Moon
  - Kamen Rider × Super Sentai: Super Hero Taisen (2012) Kintaros/Kamen Rider Den-O Ax Form, Shadow Moon
- Kamen Rider Kiva: King of the Castle in the Demon World (2008) Teacher (Cameo Role)
- Kamen Rider × Super Sentai × Space Sheriff: Super Hero Taisen Z (2013) Shadow Moon
- Ressha Sentai ToQger vs. Kyoryuger: The Movie (2015), Creator Devius
- Shuriken Sentai Ninninger (2015), Youkai Yamabiko (Ep. 14)
- Uchu Sentai Kyuranger (2017), Pega-san (Ep. 6, 44)
- Kamen Rider × Super Sentai: Ultra Super Hero Taisen (2017) Kintaros
- Kamen Rider Heisei Generations Forever (2018) Kintaros/Kamen Rider Den-O Ax Form
- Kishiryu Sentai Ryusoulger (2019) Kishiryu Tyramigo/Kishiryu Ptyramigo (Voiced by Takeshi Kusao (Kishiryu Pterardon))
- Kamen Rider Zi-O (2019) Kintaros/Kamen Rider Den-O Climax Form (Ep. 39 & 40)

=== Video games ===
- Glass Rose (2003), Hideo Yoshinodou
- Final Fantasy XII (2006), Vossler York Azelas
- Naruto: Shinobi Retsuden 3 (2006), Hidan
- Ar tonelico II (2007), Legris Branchesca
- BlazBlue (2008), Jubei
- Naruto Shippūden: Gekitou Ninja Taisen EX 3 (2008), Hidan
- Tenchu: Shadow Assassins (2008), Lord Gohda
- Steins;Gate (2009), Yūgo Tennōji
- Last Escort: Club Katze (2010), Ryusei
- Catherine (2011), Steve Delhom, Nergal
- Dragon Age II (2011), Anders
- Kamen Rider: Climax Heroes series, Kamen Rider Den-O Axe Form and Super Climax Form, Shadow Moon (in Climax Heroes Fourze) (2011)
- Bravely Default (2012), Erutus Profiteur
- Fire Emblem Awakening (2012), Basilio
- Xenoblade Chronicles X (2015), Boze
- Bravely Second (2015), Erutus Profiteur
- Breath of Fire 6 (2016), Fritz
- Mega Man 11 (2018), Pile Man (Impact Man), Chairman
- Fairy Fencer F (2013), Bahus
- Granblue Fantasy (2014), Geisenborger
- Ghost Recon Wildlands (2017), El Sueño
- For Honor (2017), The Warden
- Tokyo Afterschool Summoners (2017), Krampus
- Judgement (2018), Satoshi Shioya
- Samurai Shodown (2020), The Warden
- Star Ocean: The Divine Force (2022), Bohld'or il Weill
- The Hundred Line: Last Defense Academy (2025), Dahl'xia

=== Drama CD ===
- Ai no Kusabi (????), Alec
- GetBackers (2003), Saichou Mumyouin

=== Dubbing roles ===
==== Live-action ====
- Andy Lau
  - Dance of a Dream, Namson Lau
  - Infernal Affairs (2005 TV Tokyo edition), Lau Kin-ming
  - Infernal Affairs III (2013 BS Japan edition), Lau Kin-ming
  - A World Without Thieves, Wang Bo
  - A Battle of Wits, Ge Li
  - The Warlords, Zhao Erhu
  - The Great Wall, Wang
- Campbell Scott
  - The Spanish Prisoner, Joe Ross
  - Saint Ralph, Father George Hibbert
  - The Exorcism of Emily Rose, Ethan Thomas
  - The Amazing Spider-Man, Richard Parker
  - The Amazing Spider-Man 2, Richard Parker
- Goran Višnjić
  - ER, Dr. Luka Kovac (Season 6–)
  - Committed, Neil
  - Elektra, Mark Miller
  - Leverage, Damien Moreau
  - The Deep, Samson
- Jim Caviezel
  - Frequency, John Francis "Johnny" Sullivan
  - Pay It Forward, Jerry
  - I Am David, Johannes
  - Déjà Vu, Carroll Oerstadt
  - Transit, Nate
- Sul Kyung-gu
  - Jail Breakers, Jae-pil
  - Public Enemy, Kang Chul-jung
  - Silmido, Kang In-chan
  - Another Public Enemy, Kang Chul-jung
- Michael Fassbender
  - Inglourious Basterds, Lieutenant Archie Hicox
  - Shame, Brandon Sullivan
  - The Snowman, Harry Hole
- Eric Bana
  - Troy, Hector
  - The Time Traveler's Wife, Henry DeTamble
  - King Arthur: Legend of the Sword, Uther Pendragon
- Sean Bean
  - Ronin, Spence
  - The Dark, James
  - Jupiter Ascending, Stinger Apini
- Julian McMahon
  - Fantastic Four, Victor von Doom / Doctor Doom
  - Fantastic Four: Rise of the Silver Surfer, Victor von Doom / Doctor Doom
  - Faces in the Crowd, Detective Sam Kerrest
- 2 Fast 2 Furious, Carter Verone (Cole Hauser)
- 300, Captain Artemis (Vincent Regan)
- Æon Flux, Trevor Goodchild (Marton Csokas)
- A.I. Artificial Intelligence, Henry Swinton (Sam Robards)
- Alice in Wonderland, Charles Kingsleigh (Marton Csokas)
- All About Eve (2000 TV Tokyo edition), Bill Sampson (Gary Merrill)
- American Horror Story: Murder House, Dr. Ben Harmon (Dylan McDermott)
- Any Day Now, Paul Fliger (Garret Dillahunt)
- The Apartment (2025 BS10 Star Channel edition), Jeff D. Sheldrake (Fred MacMurray)
- As Far as My Feet Will Carry Me, Clemens Forell (Bernhard Bettermann)
- Batman Begins (2007 NTV edition), Thomas Wayne (Linus Roache)
- Batman Begins (2008 Fuji TV edition), Ra's al Ghul (Ken Watanabe)
- Behind Enemy Lines: Colombia, Alvaro Cardona (Yancey Arias)
- Black Dog (TV edition), Jack Crews (Patrick Swayze)
- Blade: Trinity, Hannibal King (Ryan Reynolds)
- Blindness, Doctor (Mark Ruffalo)
- Boardwalk Empire, Arnold Rothstein (Michael Stuhlbarg)
- Body of Lies, Hani Salaam (Mark Strong)
- Brain Games, Drew Brees
- Bulletproof Monk, The Nameless Monk (Chow Yun-fat)
- Capote, Jack Dunphy (Bruce Greenwood)
- Clash of the Titans (2012 TV Asahi edition), Acrisius (Jason Flemyng)
- Cold Case, Assistant D.A. Kite (Josh Hopkins)
- Contact (2001 TV Tokyo edition), Palmer Joss (Matthew McConaughey)
- The Da Vinci Code, Rémy Jean (Jean-Yves Berteloot)
- Diana, Hasnat Khan (Naveen Andrews)
- The Diving Bell and the Butterfly, Jean-Dominique Bauby (Mathieu Amalric)
- Dolphin Tale, Dr. Clay Haskett (Harry Connick, Jr.)
- Exit Wounds (2004 NTV edition), Latrell Walker / Leon Rollins (DMX)
- The Exorcist (2001 NTV edition), Father Damien Crow (Jason Miller)
- Flood, Rob Morrison (Robert Carlyle)
- The Foreigner, Jerome Van Aken (Harry Van Gorkum)
- The Forgotten, Ash Correll (Dominic West)
- Freddy vs. Jason (2005 TV Tokyo edition), Deputy Stubbs (Lochlyn Munro)
- From the Earth to the Moon, Host, Jean-Luc Despont (Tom Hanks)
- The Ghost Writer, Adam Peter Bennett Lang (Pierce Brosnan)
- The Girl with the Dragon Tattoo, Mikael Blomkvist (Daniel Craig)
- A Good Year, Max Skinner (Russell Crowe)
- The Great Gatsby, Tom Buchanan (Joel Edgerton)
- Green Book, Graham Kindell (Brian Stepanek)
- Green Lantern, Abin Sur (Temuera Morrison)
- Grey's Anatomy, Owen Hunt (Kevin McKidd)
- Hannibal Rising, Inspector Pascal Popil (Dominic West)
- High Noon (2021 Star Channel edition), (Gary Cooper)
- Hitman, Agent 47 (Timothy Olyphant)
- Hollow Man, Matthew Kensington (Josh Brolin)
- Home Alone 3 (2019 NTV edition), Peter Beaupre (Olek Krupa)
- The Hot Zone, Wade Carter (Liam Cunningham)
- House of the Dead 2, Ellis (Ed Quinn)
- I Am Number Four, Henri (Timothy Olyphant)
- The Imitation Game, Maj. Gen. Stewart Menzies (Mark Strong)
- Independence Day (1999 TV Asahi edition), Major Mitchell (Adam Baldwin)
- The Insider, Jeffrey Wigand (Russell Crowe)
- Insomnia, Walter Finch (Robin Williams)
- Into the Storm, Gary Morris (Richard Armitage)
- The Intruder, Charlie Peck (Dennis Quaid)
- Invincible, Dick Vermeil (Greg Kinnear)
- Kingdom Hospital, Peter Rickman) (Jack Coleman)
- The Leftovers, Kevin Garvey (Justin Theroux)
- Legion, Bob Hanson (Dennis Quaid)
- Let's Go to Prison, John Lyshitski (Dax Shepard)
- Line of Duty, Frank Penny (Aaron Eckhart)
- The Lord of the Rings: The Rings of Power, Pharazôn (Trystan Gravelle)
- Mad Dogs, Lex (Michael Imperioli)
- Maleficent, King Stefan (Sharlto Copley)
- Man of Steel, Colonel Nathan Hardy (Christopher Meloni)
- Marnie, Mark Rutland (Sean Connery)
- Melancholia, John (Kiefer Sutherland)
- The Memory Keeper's Daughter, Al (Hugh Thompson)
- The Mentalist, Walter Mashburn (Currie Graham)
- Miles Ahead, Harper Hamilton (Michael Stuhlbarg)
- The Mustang, Roman Coleman (Matthias Schoenaerts)
- My Sister's Keeper, Brian Fitzgerald (Jason Patric)
- Mystic River, Dave Boyle (Tim Robbins)
- Nim's Island, Alex Rover (Gerard Butler)
- Nosferatu, Count Orlok (Bill Skarsgård)
- The Nun, Father Burke (Demián Bichir)
- Ocean's Twelve (2007 NTV edition), Paul (Jeroen Willems)
- The Offer, Robert Evans (Matthew Goode)
- Old, Charles (Rufus Sewell)
- Pandorum, Lieutenant Peyton (Dennis Quaid)
- Pennyworth, Lord James Harwood (Jason Flemyng)
- Piranha 3DD, David Hasselhoff
- The Practice, Alan Shore (James Spader)
- Prodigal Son, Gil Arroyo (Lou Diamond Phillips)
- Prometheus, Charlie Holloway (Logan Marshall-Green)
- Proof of Life, Dino (David Caruso)
- Purple Noon (2016 Star Channel edition), Inspector Riccordi (Erno Crisa)
- Rage, Paul Maguire (Nicolas Cage)
- REC, Manu (Ferrán Terraza)
- Reckoning, Detective Sergeant Mike Serrato (Aden Young)
- Red Sparrow, Ivan Vladimirovich Egorov (Matthias Schoenaerts)
- Redemption: The Stan Tookie Williams Story, Stanley Williams (Jamie Foxx)
- Resident Evil: Apocalypse, Carlos Oliveira (Oded Fehr)
- Resident Evil: Extinction, Carlos Oliveira (Oded Fehr)
- The Road, The Man (Viggo Mortensen)
- The Road Home, Luo Yusheng (Sun Honglei)
- Rogue One, Senator Bail Organa (Jimmy Smits)
- Roman Holiday (PDDVD edition), Joe (Gregory Peck)
- Rome, Titus Pullo (Ray Stevenson)
- Rules Don't Apply, Howard Hughes (Warren Beatty)
- Rush, Stirling Moss (Alistair Petrie)
- The Secret Life of Bees, T-Ray Owens (Paul Bettany)
- Secret Window, Ted Milner (Timothy Hutton)
- Shattered Glass, Charles Lane (Peter Sarsgaard)
- Shaun of the Dead, David (Dylan Moran)
- The Shield, David Aceveda (Benito Martinez)
- The Shipping News, Quoyle (Kevin Spacey)
- Somewhere in Time (2003 DVD edition), Richard Collier (Christopher Reeve)
- Spartacus (2015 Blu-Ray edition), Spartacus (Kirk Douglas)
- Star Wars: Episode II – Attack of the Clones, Senator Bail Organa (Jimmy Smits)
- Star Wars: Episode III – Revenge of the Sith, Senator Bail Organa (Jimmy Smits)
- Taken 3, Stuart St. John (Dougray Scott)
- Taxi (2008 Fuji TV edition), Agent Mullins (Christian Kane)
- The Three Musketeers, D'Artagnan's father (Dexter Fletcher)
- The Towering Inferno (2013 BS Japan edition), Doug Roberts (Paul Newman)
- This Means War, Karl Heinrich (Til Schweiger)
- Tristan & Isolde, Lord Mark of Cornwall (Rufus Sewell)
- Twin Peaks (2017), DEA Agent Denise Bryson (David Duchovny)
- Two Brothers, Aidan McCrory (Guy Pearce)
- Ugly Betty, Connor Owens (Grant Bowler)
- Unforgettable, Lt. Al Burns (Dylan Walsh)
- Unstoppable (2004), Peterson (Kim Coates)
- Unstoppable (2010), Judd Stewart (David Warshofsky)
- War of the Worlds, Harlan Ogilvy (Tim Robbins)
- When in Rome, Derek Hammond (Julian Stone)
- The White Countess, Matsuda (Hiroyuki Sanada)
- Windtalkers, Sergeant Peter "Ox" Anderson (Christian Slater)
- The World's Fastest Indian, Jim Moffet (Christopher Lawford)
- The Yellow Sea, Tae-won (Jo Sung-ha)
- Younger, Charles Brooks (Peter Hermann)

==== Animation ====
- Balto II: Wolf Quest, Balto
- Balto III: Wings of Change, Balto
- The Boondocks, White Shadow
- The Croods, Grug Crood
- The Croods: A New Age, Grug Crood
- Fantastic Mr. Fox, Mr. "Foxy" Fox
- Happy Feet, Memphis
- Lego Star Wars: The Padawan Menace, George Lucas
- Love, Death & Robots, Nigel
- RWBY, General James Ironwood
- Star Wars: The Clone Wars, Bail Prestor Organa
- Star Wars: Rebels, Bail Prestor Organa
- Josee, the Tiger and the Fish, Ishi

== Live-action roles ==
- Tokkei Winspector (1990), Takeda (episode 14)
- Tokkyuu Shirei Solbrain (1991-1992), Ryuuichi Takaoka (episodes 34, 35, 40, 43 & 51-53)
- Choujin Sentai Jetman (1991), Kyoutarou Tatsumi (episode 8)
- Aoi Tokugawa Sandai (2000), Itakura Shigemasa
- Kamen Rider Agito (2001), Ryuuji Tsukasa (actor) (Ep. 18 & 19)
- Kamen Rider Kiva: King of the Castle in the Demon World (2008), Teacher
