= List of Kamen Rider Den-O characters =

Select cast members of Kamen Rider Den-O. From left to right: Hana, Naomi, Momotaros, Kintaros, Urataros, Owner, and Ryotaro Nogami.

Kamen Rider Den-O (仮面ライダー電王, Kamen Raidā Den'ō) is a Japanese tokusatsu series that serves as the 17th installment in the Kamen Rider franchise and the eighth entry in the Heisei era.

== Main characters ==
=== Ryotaro Nogami ===
Ryotaro Nogami (野上 良太郎, Nogami Ryōtarō) is an optimistic yet unlucky young man who becomes Kamen Rider Den-O after picking up a Rider Pass (ライダーパス, Raidā Pasu) and being convinced by Hana to help mankind. Over the course of the series, he discovers that he is a Singularity Point (特異点, Tokuiten), an individual who can overpower Imagin attempting to possess him, exist outside of time, and is largely immune to timeline changes. Additionally, he forms bonds with Imagin who disagree with their kind's methods and allow him to assume stronger forms.

Utilizing a Rider Pass in conjunction with the Den-O Belt (デンオウベルト, Den'ō Beruto), Ryotaro can transform into the base Kamen Rider Den-O Plat Form (プラットフォーム, Puratto Fōmu). While transformed, he wields the DenGasher (デンガッシャー, Dengasshā), which can be reconfigured into varying forms that allow him to perform Full Charge (フルチャージ, Furu Chāji) finishers. However, due to his lack of combat prowess and Plat Form's lack of offensive capabilities, Ryotaro initially allows his Imagin partners to possess him and assume combat-oriented forms tailored to their fighting styles. His personal vehicle is the Machine DenBird (マシンデンバード, Mashin Denbādo) motorcycle.

Later in the series, Ryotaro acquires additional items that can combine with his preexisting devices to achieve the following power-up forms:

- Climax Form (クライマックスフォーム, Kuraimakkusu Fōmu): Ryotaro's super form accessed by combining the Den-O Belt and the K-Taros (ケータロス, Kētarosu) cellphone that allows him to fuse with all four of his Imagin partners at once.
  - Super Climax Form (超･クライマックスフォー, Chō Kuraimakkusu Fōmu): An evolution of Climax Form that fuses with Sieg to grant a pair of bird wings. This form first appears in the film Cho Kamen Rider Den-O & Decade Neo Generations: The Onigashima Warship.
- Liner Form (ライナーフォーム, Rainā Fōmu): Ryotaro's final form accessed by combining a Rider Pass and the DenKamen Sword (デンカメンソード, Denkamen Sōdo), which like the DenGasher can be reconfigured into varying forms, that allows him to channel his Imagin partners' abilities.

During the events of the film Saraba Kamen Rider Den-O: Final Countdown, Ryotaro is possessed by the Ghost Imagin, who forces him to utilize a Rider Pass in conjunction with the Yuuki Belt to transform into Kamen Rider Yuuki Skull Form (スカルフォーム, Sukaru Fōmu). While transformed, he wields the Ghost Imagin's sword, which allows him to perform the Terminate Flash (ターミネイトフラッシュ, Tāmineito Furasshu) Full Charge.

Ryotaro is portrayed by Takeru Satoh (佐藤 健, Satō Takeru).

==== Kotaro ====
"Kotaro" (小太郎, Kotarō), as nicknamed by Hana, is Ryotaro's 11-year-old self who appears exclusively in the film Kamen Rider Den-O: I'm Born!. While living with his grandmother, he occasionally snuck out to cope with losing his parents. During one such excursion, he encounters the DenLiner crew amidst their efforts to stop Gaoh and ends up being possessed by Momotaros, who uses him to transform into a smaller version of Kamen Rider Den-O called Kamen Rider Mini Den-O (仮面ライダーミニ電王, Kamen Raidā Mini Den'ō) to fight Gaoh's forces due to the present Ryotaro's memory loss voiding their contract. Following the battle, the DenLiner crew take Kotaro to see his parents during his birth before returning him to his proper time period.

Kotaro is portrayed by Takuya Mizoguchi (溝口 琢矢, Mizoguchi Takuya), who also portrays the de-aged Ryotaro in the Cho-Den-O series.

=== Hana/Kohana ===
Hana (ハナ) is a Singularity Point, passenger of the DenLiner, daughter of Airi and Yuto, and niece of Ryotaro who originates from a future that the Imagin destroyed. As the sole survivor, she vowed revenge on the Imagin and joined the DenLiner's crew to protect the timeline from them. In pursuit of this goal, she convinces Ryotaro to become Kamen Rider Den-O and often serves as an enforcer to keep his Imagin partners in line, though she eventually comes to see them in a better light. As her future is gradually recreated, Hana physically regresses to her childhood self and assumes the alias of Kohana (コハナ), though she stays on the DenLiner and later becomes a member of the DenLiner Police to continue protecting the timeline.

Hana is portrayed by Yuriko Shiratori (白鳥 百合子, Shiratori Yuriko) while Kohana is portrayed by Tamaki Matsumoto (松元 環季, Matsumoto Tamaki).

=== Taros ===
The Taros (タロス, Tarosu) are Ryotaro's Imagin partners. They would eventually become the DenLiner Police (デンライナーポリス, Denrainā Porisu) to keep rogue Imagin in check.

==== Momotaros ====
Momotaros (モモタロス, Momotarosu) is a hot-headed and arrogant yet comedic Oni/namesake-themed Imagin who is more interested in fighting than helping other Imagin. After initially failing to possess Ryotaro, Momotaros reluctantly joins the DenLiner crew where he forms a contract with and fights alongside the former. In time, he becomes the self-proclaimed leader of Ryotaro's Imagin partners. He would eventually represent Kamen Rider Den-O as a whole in succeeding media in light of Ryotaro's absence.

In battle, Momotaros wields the Momotarosword (モモタロスォード, Momotaroswōdo). As Kamen Rider Den-O, he assumes the red-colored Sword Form (ソードフォーム, Sōdo Fōmu) where he primarily wields the DenGasher in Sword Mode (ソードモード, Sōdo Mōdo), which allows him to perform the Extreme Slash (エクストリームスラッシュ, Ekusutorīmu Surasshu) Full Charge. He also controls the head and torso of (Super) Climax Form, though he can control the form's other sections as well, and can channel his power through the DenKamen Sword's Sword Mode.

During the events of the crossover film Kamen Rider × Super Sentai: Ultra Super Hero Taisen, the Game World version of Momotaros temporarily assumes the form of Momorider (モモライダー, Momoraidā) where he commands the DenLiner.

Momotaros is voiced by Toshihiko Seki (関 俊彦, Seki Toshihiko).

==== Urataros ====
Urataros (ウラタロス, Uratarosu) is a suave, charming yet deceitful sea turtle/Urashima Tarō-themed Imagin who encounters Ryotaro after possessing him to use his status as a Singularity Point to pursue personal freedoms. Despite his personality, the latter allows the Imagin to stay after sensing he has a good heart.

In battle, Urataros wields the Uratarod (ウラタロッド, Urataroddo) staff. As Kamen Rider Den-O, he assumes the blue-colored Rod Form (ロッドフォーム, Roddo Fōmu) where he primarily wields the DenGasher in Rod Mode (ロッドモード, Roddo Mōdo), which allows him to consecutively perform the Solid Attack (ソリッドアタック, Soriddo Atakku) and Den-Rider Kick (デンライダーキック, Denraidā Kikku) Full Charges. He also controls the right arm of (Super) Climax Form and can channel his power through the DenKamen Sword's Rod Mode.

Urataros is voiced by Kōji Yusa (遊佐 浩二, Yusa Kōji).

==== Kintaros ====
Kintaros (キンタロス, Kintaros) is a noble bear/namesake-themed Imagin with a sumo wrestler-like personality and fighting style who displays an obsession with making his opponents "cry" (泣けるで, nakeru de).

In battle, Kintaros wields the Kintaros Axe (キンタロスアックス, Kintarosu Akkusu). As Kamen Rider Den-O, he assumes the yellow-colored Axe Form (アックスフォーム, Akkusu Fōmu) where he primarily wields the DenGasher in Axe Mode (アックスモード, Akkusu Mōdo), which allows him to perform the Dynamic Chop (ダイナミックチョップ, Dainamikku Choppu) Full Charge. He also controls the left arm of (Super) Climax Form and can channel his power through the DenKamen Sword's Axe Mode.

Kintaros is voiced by Masaki Terasoma (てらそま まさき, Terasoma Masaki).

==== Ryutaros ====
Ryutaros (リュウタロス, Ryūtarosu) is a childish dragon/Taro the Dragon Boy-themed Imagin and a former member of Kai's gang who displays a love of breakdancing and animals. Having laid dormant in Ryotaro until he is awakened by Issē's counseling, Ryutaros initially seeks to take over the DenLiner and kill Ryotaro as part of a deal with Kai. However, the Imagin develops a crush on Airi, abandons his plans, and joins the DenLiner's crew.

In battle, Ryutaros wields the Ryuvolver (リュウボルバー, Ryūborubā) shotgun. As Kamen Rider Den-O, he assumes the purple-colored Gun Form (ガンフォーム, Gan Fōmu) where he primarily wields the DenGasher in Gun Mode (ガンモード, Gan Mōdo), which allows him to perform the Wild Shot (ワイルドショット, Wairudo Shotto) Full Charge. He also controls the legs of (Super) Climax Form and can channel his power through the DenKamen Sword's Gun Mode.

Ryutaros is voiced by Kenichi Suzumura (鈴村 健一, Suzumura Ken'ichi).

=== Yuto Sakurai ===
Yuto Sakurai (桜井 侑斗, Sakurai Yūto) is a spoiled, immature, and wrathful former high school student who was recruited by his future self to become Kamen Rider Zeronos (仮面ライダーゼロノス, Kamen Raidā Zeronosu) and utilize the ZeroLiner (ゼロライナー, Zerorainā) steam locomotive to protect the timeline from rogue Imagin, though memories of him across the timeline are erased every time he uses his Rider powers. Taking his mission seriously, Yuto abuses his Imagin partner Deneb and initially sees Ryotaro as being unfit to be a Kamen Rider because of the latter's desire to protect people and for refusing to use dishonest methods. However, Yuto eventually warms up to him and takes on some of his traits.

Utilizing one of several green-colored Zeronos Cards (ゼロノスカード, Zeronosu Kādo) in conjunction with the Zeronos Belt (ゼロノスベルト, Zeronosu Berut), Yuto can transform into Kamen Rider Zeronos Altair Form (アルタイルフォーム, Arutairu Fōmu). While transformed, he wields the ZeroGasher (ゼロガッシャー, Zerogasshā), which has a Saber Mode (サーベルモード, Sāberu Mōdo) for performing the Splendid End (スプレンディッドエンド, Supurendiddo Endo) Full Charge and a Bowgun Mode (ボウガンモード, Bōgan Mōdo) for performing the Grand Strike (グランドストライク, Gurando Sutoraiku) Full Charge. His personal vehicle is the Machine ZeroHorn (マシンゼロホーン, Mashin Zerohōn) motorcycle.

Later in the series, Yuto acquires a series of rust-colored Zeronos Cards, which allow him to assume Zero Form (ゼロフォーム, Zero Fōmu). In this form, he gains the ability to transform Deneb into the Denebick Buster (デネビックバスター, Denebikku Basutā) Gatling gun for his use in combat, which allows him to perform the Buster Nova (バスターノヴァ, Basutā Nova) Full Charge.

During the events of the web series Kamen Rider Outsiders, an alternate universe Yuto from a world where he lost his loved ones and was involved in an undisclosed disaster that he failed to overcome accepts the A.I. Zein's offer to eradicate malice as he acquires the Zein Driver (ゼインドライバー, Zein Doraibā) belt and its corresponding Progrise Key from Sakuya Tachibana and George Karizaki, allowing him to transform into Kamen Rider Zein (仮面ライダーゼイン, Kamen Raidā Zein). While transformed, he can use one of several Zein Cards (ゼインカード, Zein Kādo), based on the Rider Cards, to gain the abilities and/or weaponry of the corresponding Kamen Rider. However, each Zein Card is only usable once, as they will be shredded after being used in the Zein Driver. His finishers are the Justice Order (ジャスティスオーダー, Jasutisu Ōda) and the Justice Punishment (ジャスティスパニッシュメント, Jasutisu Panisshumento).

Yuto Sakurai is portrayed by Yuichi Nakamura (中村 優一, Nakamura Yūichi).

==== Yu ====
"Yu" (ユウ, Yū) is the nickname of Yuto's 11-year-old self who appears exclusively in the film Cho Kamen Rider Den-O & Decade Neo Generations: The Onigashima Warship. Having lost his mother to an unspecified disease and his father going away for a business trip, Yu is forced to move in with his grandmother in the countryside where he has trouble making friends. As a result of the Oni clan attempting to alter the present by rewriting the Momotarō folktale, Yu gets caught in the middle of the conflict between them and the DenLiner crew as he possessed the Trump Stone (切り札の石, Kirifuda no Ishi), an artifact passed down by his mother's ancestors that the Oni clan seek for their plot. In order to recover Yuto from the time distortion and help fight the Oni clan, Yu forms a contract with Deneb and eventually finds his courage once he is returned to his original time.

Yu is portrayed by Ruka Sawaki (沢木 ルカ, Sawaki Ruka).

=== Deneb ===
Deneb (デネブ, Denebu) is a polite and loyal yet over-apologetic crow/Benkei-themed Imagin and Yuto's partner who serves as his butler, parental figure, and combat aide. Despite being abused by Yuto, Deneb stays with him out of loyalty to the former's future self.

As Kamen Rider Zeronos, Deneb utilizes one of several yellow-colored Zeronos Cards in conjunction with the Zeronos Belt to assume Vega Form (ベガフォーム, Bega Fōmu) where he is equipped with the twin shoulder-mounted Zeronos Nova (ゼロノスノヴァ, Zeronosu Nova) cannons.

Deneb is voiced by Hōchū Ōtsuka (大塚 芳忠, Ōtsuka Hōchū).

== Recurring characters ==
=== Airi Nogami ===
Airi Nogami (野上 愛理, Nogami Airi) is Ryotaro's older sister and owner of the Milk Dipper (ミルクディッパー, Miruku Dippā) library/café, which previously belonged to their parents, who serves as a motherly figure to him, and the object of several young men's affections, though she remains oblivious to their advances. She was originally meant to marry Yuto prior to the series, having becoming pregnant with Hana, but Sakurai was forced to erase himself and their child from Airi's memories to protect her from Kai. Nonetheless, she retains trace amounts of her time with him, which manifests as a feeling that something is missing. By the series finale, she regains her memories of him.

Airi is portrayed by Wakana Matsumoto (松本 若菜, Matsumoto Wakana).

=== Seigi Ozaki ===
Seigi Ozaki (尾崎 正義, Ozaki Seigi) is a journalist, chief editor of a short-lived magazine, and a regular at the Milk Dipper who seeks to restore the magazine. While he primarily seeks Airi's affections, he has flirted with other women since childhood.

Seigi Ozaki is portrayed by Akira Nagata (永田 彬, Nagata Akira).

=== Issē Miura ===
Issē Miura (三浦 イッセー, Miura Issē) is an introverted and self-styled "super counselor" and a regular at the Milk Dipper who also vies for Airi's affections.

Issē Miura is portrayed by Ryo Ueno (上野 亮, Ueno Ryō).

=== Naomi ===
Naomi (ナオミ) is the hyperactive and perky yet level-headed waitress of the DenLiner's dining car who, despite her best efforts, often makes coffee that tastes terrible to humans, but is irresistible to Imagin.

Naomi is portrayed by Rina Akiyama (秋山 莉奈, Akiyama Rina).

=== Owner ===
The serious yet eccentric Owner (オーナー, Ōnā) of the time-traveling DenLiner (デンライナー, Denrainā) bullet train is a Singularity Point who is knowledgeable in the timeline's inner workings, speaks in complex riddles when discussing its nature, and displays zero tolerance for those who fight on the DenLiner and violate the flow of time. He is also known for eating dishes, usually rice or flan, adorned with a flag, and attempting to finish the meal without knocking the flag over as part of a rivalry he shares with the Station Master. During the events of the film Kamen Rider Den-O & Kiva: Climax Deka, the Owner establishes the DenLiner Police, names himself its Chief Inspector, and takes up a DenGasher modified to shoot tranquilizer flags.

The Owner is portrayed by Kenjirō Ishimaru (石丸 謙二郎, Ishimaru Kenjirō), who also portrays the Station Master.

=== Past Man ===
The "Past Man" (過去の男, Kako no Otoko) is Yuto's mysterious future self and Hana's father who investigates the Imagin's activities. He was originally set to marry Airi until Kai's plans forced him to erase himself from the timeline to protect her and Hana, go into hiding to stop him, and recruit his younger self to assist further.

The Past Man is portrayed by Tomonobu Okano (岡野 友信, Okano Tomonobu).

=== Sieg ===
Sieg (ジーク, Jīku) is a princely yet superior-minded and easily agitated swan/Swan Lake-themed Imagin and unofficial member of Ryotaro's group. Six months prior to the latter becoming Kamen Rider Den-O, Sieg intended to form a contract with a pregnant woman named Shiori Takayama, but was trapped within a deep sleep by her baby, Yusuke. After Yusuke is born, Sieg emerges with no memory of what happened and left gradually deteriorating due to the baby not having enough memory to maintain his existence. Sieg possesses Ryotaro to save himself before realizing he successfully formed a contract with Shiori, who wished for Yusuke to be safe. Having fulfilled the contract, he stays behind on the date of her fondest memory, her wedding day, but occasionally returns to aid the DenLiner crew.

As Kamen Rider Den-O, Sieg utilizes a Rider Pass in conjunction with the Wing Buckle (ウイングバックル, Uingu Bakkuru) belt to assume the white-colored Wing Form (ウイングフォーム, Uingu Fōmu) where he primarily wields the DenGasher in Hand Axe Mode (ハンドアックスモード, Hando Akkusu Mōdo) and Boomerang Mode (ブーメランモード, Būmeran Mōdo), which allows him to perform the Royal Smash (ロイヤルスマッシュ, Roiyaru Sumasshu) Full Charge. He also controls the back of Super Climax Form.

Sieg is voiced by Shin-ichiro Miki (三木 眞一郎, Miki Shin'ichirō).

=== Gaoh ===
Gaoh (牙王, Gaō; Fang King) is a thief-king who became disillusioned with the idea of time and seeks to take over the space-time continuum via the power of the GaohLiner (ガオウライナー, Gaōrainā), a legendary crocodile-themed time train formerly known as God's Train (神の列車, Kami no Ressha) that was created by an ancient civilization to erase Singularity Points before it was sealed for fear of its power. Throughout episodes 25–28 and the film Kamen Rider Den-O: I'm Born!, Gaoh leads an army of Imagin in establishing a camp in May 2000 and sending Mole Imagin to 2007 to lure the DenLiner crew into a trap so he can steal the DenLiner itself and use the Owner's Master Pass to travel to the Sengoku era. From there, he manipulates Sanada Yukimura into opening the cave where the GaohLiner was sealed before using it to reach 1988 with the intention of killing Ryotaro before he is born, only to be foiled by Kamen Rider Zeronos and four versions of Kamen Rider Den-O from across the timeline and turned to dust while the GaohLiner is destroyed by the DenLiner and ZeroLiner.

Utilizing the Master Pass (マスターパス, Masutā Pasu) in conjunction with the Gaoh Belt (ガオウベルト, Gaō Beruto), Gaoh can transform into Kamen Rider Gaoh (仮面ライダーガオウ（牙王）, Kamen Raidā Gaō). While transformed, he wields the serrated GaohGasher (ガオウガッシャー, Gaōgasshā) sword, which allows him to perform the Tyrant Crash (タイラントクラッシュ, Tairanto Kurasshu) Full Charge. His personal vehicle is the Machine GaohStriker (マシンガオウストライカー, Mashin Gaōsutoraikā) motorcycle.

Gaoh is portrayed by Hiroyuki Watanabe (渡辺 裕之, Watanabe Hiroyuki).

=== Station Master ===
The Station Master (駅長, Ekichō) is the Owner's effeminate rival who physically resembles him, though they claim it is simply others' imagination.

The Station Master is portrayed by Kenjirō Ishimaru, who also portrays the Owner.

=== Kai ===
Kai (カイ) is a Singularity Point from the future and the leader of an army of Imagin who possesses psychic powers, such as telepathy and mind control, and the ability to open time portals who seeks to save the Imagin's time by killing a special human called the "Junction Point". In pursuit of his goal, he sends Imagin to wreak havoc across the timeline in search of them. Initially believing it is Yuto's future self, Kai attempts to kill him before shifting his attention to Kamen Rider Den-O. He eventually discovers Hana is his target, but is ultimately killed by Kamen Rider Den-O and his allies, causing him to dissolve into sand and take several Imagin with him.

Kai is portrayed by Hideo Ishiguro (石黒 英雄, Ishiguro Hideo).

== Guest characters ==
- Imagin (イマジン, Imajin): (Note: Their name is derived from "imagine", "djinn", and the Japanese word "majin".) Sand-based monsters from a possible future who lost their physical forms after their timeline was erased. Now dependent on memories to survive, they possess humans to form a contract with them and assume physical forms based on key fictional characters from their memories. Due to their physiology, some Imagin possess the ability to create clones of themselves with minor physical and mental differences. Additionally, Imagin have the potential to spawn one or several giant, feral monsters called Gigandeaths (ギガンデス, Gigandesu), which are divided between three sub-species: the bird-like Gigandeath Heaven (ギガンデスヘブン, Gigandesu Hebun), the eel-like Gigandeath Hades (ギガンデスハデス, Gigandesu Hadesu), and the behemoth-like Gigandeath Hell (ギガンデスヘル, Gigandesu Heru). The majority of Imagin join Kai in traveling to the year 2007 to find weak-willed humans, form contracts by granting their wishes, and use their host's memories to travel back through their personal timelines to find and kill a special Singularity Point called the "Junction Point" (分岐点の鍵, Bunkiten no Kagi) to restore their time. Being individuals with unique personalities and quirks, several Imagin choose to act independently of Kai or with other individuals.
  - Bat Imagin (バットイマジン, Batto Imajin) A namesake/"The Bat, the Birds, and the Beasts"-themed Imagin that can produce sonic blasts and possesses arm wings that allow him to create powerful gusts. After forming a contract with a young man named Tetsuo (テツオ) to retrieve the latter's keychain, the monster attacks and kill anyone who possesses a matching keychain. Upon fulfilling the contract, the Bat Imagin travels back in time to 2004 and possesses Tetsuo's past self to wreak havoc, but he is killed by Kamen Rider Den-O Sword Form. The Bat Imagin is voiced by Kiyoyuki Yanada (梁田 清之, Yanada Kiyoyuki) while Tetsuo is portrayed by Motoki Ochiai (落合 扶樹, Ochiai Motoki).
  - Chameleon Imagin (カメレオンイマジン, Kamereon Imajin): A namesake/"The Frog Prince"-themed Imagin that can breathe fire and wields a whip. After forming a contract with Yū Yamagoshi (山越 佑, Yamagoshi Yū), who desires money, the monster robs banks for him. Upon fulfilling the contract, he travels back in time to 2006, but is killed by Kamen Rider Den-O Sword Form. The Chameleon Imagin is voiced by Jun'ichi Kanemaru (金丸 淳一, Kanemaru Jun'ichi) while Yū Yamagoshi is portrayed by Kazuki Namioka (波岡 一喜, Namioka Kazuki).
  - Crust Imagin (クラストイマジン, Kurasuto Imajin): A crustacean/"The Crab and the Monkey"-themed Imagin who possesses seaweed-like tendrils and wields a boomerang sword. After forming a contract with Daiki Saitō (斉藤 大輝, Saitō Daiki), who wants to rejoin his soccer team, the monster attacks and hospitalizes the other members. Upon fulfilling the contract, the Crust Imagin travels back in time to 2006 to destroy the soccer stadium, only to be foiled and killed by Kamen Rider Den-O Rod Form. The Crust Imagin is voiced by Kyousei Tsukui (津久井 教生, Tsukui Kyōsei) while Daiki Saitō is portrayed by Yuki Ogoe (小越 勇輝, Ogoe Yūki).
  - Crow Imagin (クロウイマジン, Kurou Imajin): A namesake/"The Bird in Borrowed Feathers"-themed Imagin who wields a cane and possesses feathers that double as explosive shuriken. After forming a contract with Yumi Saitō (斉藤 優美, Saitō Yumi), who wishes to forget about her ex-boyfriend Toyama, the monster destroys anything playing "Four Seasons Concerto No. 1: Spring" and travels back in time to 2006 to kill everyone who attended Yumi and Toyama's wedding until he is defeated by Kamen Rider Den-O Rod and Sword Form. The Crow Imagin is voiced by Rintarō Nishi (西 凛太朗, Nishi Rintarō) while Yumi Saitō is portrayed by Hitomi Kurihara (栗原 瞳, Kurihara Hitomi).
  - Rhino Imagin (ライノイマジン, Raino Imajin): A namesake/"The Naked Rhinoceros"-themed Imagin who possesses superhuman strength and a mace capable of firing energy blasts. After forming a contract with Shinji Kikuchi (菊池 信司, Kikuchi Shinji), who wishes to become a karate master, the monster attacks his rivals. Upon fulfilling the contract, the Rhino Imagin travels back in time to 2006 to destroy a karate arena, only to be foiled and killed by Kamen Rider Den-O Axe Form. The Rhino Imagin is voiced by Tsuyoshi Koyama (小山 剛志, Koyama Tsuyoshi) while Shinji Kikuchi is portrayed by Hiroshi Yazaki (矢崎 広, Yazaki Hiroshi).
  - Ivy Imagin (アイビーイマジン, Aibī Imajin): A namesake/"Jack and the Beanstalk"-themed Imagin who can fire energy beams from his fingers, possesses vine-like tendrils, and wields a double-edged sword. After forming a contract with Kensaku Kobayashi (小林 謙作, Kobayashi Kensaku), who wants to be with his daughter Kasumi, the monster sabotages her career and travels back in time to 2006 to destroy Kensaku's hometown until the monster is destroyed by Kamen Rider Den-O Axe Form. Following the battle, a time distortion caused by it undoes the monster's damage. The Ivy Imagin is voiced by Keiichi Sonobe (園部 啓一, Sonobe Keiichi) while Kensaku Kobayashi is portrayed by Narushi Ikeda (池田 成志, Ikeda Narushi).
  - Owl Imagin (オウルイマジン, Ōru Imajin): A namesake/"The Owl and the Birds"-themed Imagin who can fly and wields feather bombs. After forming a contract with Shūji Toyama (戸山 秀二, Toyama Shūji), who wishes for the park he works at to be a better place for the stray animals that live there, the monster attacks any humans who step foot in the park before using cars to barricade the park. Upon fulfilling the contract, the Owl Imagin travels back in time to 1997 to wreak havoc, only to be killed by Kamen Rider Den-O Gun Form. The Owl Imagin is voiced by Takaya Kuroda (黒田 崇矢, Kuroda Takaya) while Shūji Toyama is portrayed by Shun Ueda (うえだ 峻, Ueda Shun).
  - Whale Imagin (ホエールイマジン, Hoēru Imajin): A namesake/The Adventures of Pinocchio-themed Imagin subspecies that specialize in underwater combat and can fire streams of water from their mouths. In episodes 15 and 16, a staff-wielding instance forms a contract with Kōsaku Higuchi (火口 耕作, Higuchi Kōsaku), who wishes to absolve himself of his drinking addiction, and attacks anyone who knows of it. Upon fulfilling the contract, the Whale Imagin travels back in time to 2004 to attack partygoers until he is killed by Kamen Rider Den-O Sword Form. In the series finale, a sword-wielding instance appears as a member of Kai's army. The Whale Imagin is voiced by Yōhei Tadano (多田野 曜平, Tadano Yōhei) while Kōsaku Higuchi is portrayed by Mansaku Fuwa (不破 万作, Fuwa Mansaku).
  - Wolf Imagin (ウルフイマジン, Urufu Imajin): A namesake/Big Bad Wolf-themed Imagin who wields a sword capable of firing crescent-shaped energy beams. In the series, one hot-tempered instance forms a contract with Yuka Sawada (沢田 由香, Sawada Yuka), who wishes to relive her high school days, by vaporizing school girls and giving their possessions to her. Upon fulfilling the contract, the Wolf Imagin travels back in time to 2004, but is thwarted and killed by Kamen Rider Den-O Sword Form. Additional instances of the Wolf Imagin also appear in the Hyper Battle DVD special Kamen Rider Den-O: Singing, Dancing, Great Training!! and the Imagin Anime shorts. The Wolf Imagin is voiced by Nobuyuki Hiyama (檜山 修之, Hiyama Nobuyuki) while Yuka Sawada is portrayed by Hikari Mitsushima (満島 ひかり, Mitsushima Hikari).
  - Jelly Imagin (ジェリーイマジン, Jerī Imajin): A jellyfish/"The Jellyfish Errand"-themed Imagin who possesses tentacles, electrokinesis, and the ability to liquefy himself. After forming a contract with Kōhei Amano (天野 晃平, Amano Kōhei), who wishes to unearth a time capsule his deceased girlfriend Haruka buried, the monster forces him to unearth any time capsule he sees being buried. Upon fulfilling the contract, the Jelly Imagin travels back in time to 2006 and attacks a group of picnickers near the site where Haruka buried her time capsule and overpowers Kamen Rider Den-O Sword Form until he is killed by Kamen Rider Zeronos Vega Form. The Jelly Imagin is voiced by Ryūsei Nakao (中尾 隆聖, Nakao Ryūsei) while Kōhei Amano is portrayed by Yuki Yoshinaga (吉永 雄紀, Yoshinaga Yūki).
  - Tortoise Imagin (トータスイマジン, Tōtasu Imajin): A two-in-one namesake/"The Tortoise and the Hare"-themed Imagin consisting of the Tortoise Imagin Turtle (トータスイマジン カメ, Tōtasu Imajin Kame), the serious-minded primary body who possesses a durable hide and the ability to fire pellets from his mouth; and the Tortoise Imagin Rabbit (トータスイマジン ウサギ, Tōtasu Imajin Usagi), an energetic yet childish hare-themed offshoot who resides within the primary body. After initially failing to make a contract with Tanaka (田中), who made an unspecified wish while he was half-asleep, the Tortoise Imagin eventually travels back in time to 2006 before he is killed by Kamen Riders Zeronos Altair Form and Den-O Rod Form. The Tortoise Imagin is voiced by Kōji Ochiai (落合 弘治, Ochiai Kōji) while Tanaka is portrayed by Yusuke Shoji (少路 勇介, Shōji Yūsuke).
  - Scorpion Imagin (スコーピオンイマジン, Sukōpion Imajin): A namesake/"The Boy Hunting Locusts"-themed Imagin who wields an axe and a stinger-like hand capable of firing energy needles. After forming a contract with Akio Masuda (増田 明男, Masuda Akio), who kidnapped Shiori Takayama's baby Yusuke and wished to find her, the Scorpion Imagin kidnaps her. Upon fulfilling the contract, the monster travels back in time to 2002, but is killed by Kamen Rider Den-O Rod and Axe Form. The Scorpion Imagin is voiced by Nobutoshi Canna (神奈 延年, Kanna Nobutoshi) while Akio Masuda is portrayed by Tsuyoshi Muro (ムロ ツヨシ, Muro Tsuyoshi).
  - Spider Imagin (スパイダーイマジン, Supaidā Imajin): A namesake/tsuchigumo-themed Imagin sub-species. After forming a contract with Masashi Aoki (青木 雅史, Aoki Masashi), who wants to help his sister Mayu see the stars, one instance kidnaps and ties her to a radio tower, but is killed by Kamen Rider Zeronos Altair Form. Nonetheless, it produces a clone at the last minute, who goes on to resume the contract by causing a blackout before it is killed by a future version of Kamen Rider Zeronos Altair Form and Kamen Rider Den-O Gun Form. Additional instances of the Spider Imagin also appear in the Hyper Battle DVD special Kamen Rider Den-O: Singing, Dancing, Great Training!! and Episode Yellow of the Cho-Den-O film trilogy. The Spider Imagin is voiced by Chihiro Suzuki (鈴木 千尋, Suzuki Chihiro) in the series and Akira Sasanuma in Episode Yellow while Masashi Aoki is portrayed by Kōhei Yamamoto (山本 康平, Yamamoto Kōhei).
  - Wasp Imagin (ワスプイマジン, Wasupu Imajin): A namesake/"The Wasp and the Snake"-themed Imagin sub-species who possess the ability to fire needles from their foreheads and wield rapiers. After forming a contract with a criminal named Machida (町田), who wishes to have his criminal record expunged, one instance of the Wasp Imagin travels back in time to 2005, only to be killed by Kamen Rider Den-O Climax Form. An additional instance of the Wasp Imagin also appears in the series finale as a member of Kai's army. The Wasp Imagin is voiced by Shōto Kashii (樫井 笙人, Kashii Shōto) while Machida is portrayed by Takuma Sugawara (菅原 卓磨, Sugawara Takuma).
  - Bluebird Imagin (ブルーバードイマジン, Burūbādo Imajin): A namesake/"The Blue Bird"-themed Imagin sub-species who possess similar abilities as the Owl Imagin and the additional ability to produce fireworks. After forming a contract with Tōru Terasaki (寺崎 トオル, Terasaki Tōru), who wishes for his wife to see fireworks, one instance of the Bluebird Imagin uses his powers on her, only to be thwarted by Kamen Rider Zeronos and Deneb. Upon completing the contract, he travels back in time to 2002, only to be killed by Kamen Rider Den-O Climax Form. An additional instance of the Bluebird Imagin also appears in the series finale as a member of Kai's army. The Bluebird Imagin is voiced by Mitsuaki Hoshino (星野 充昭, Hoshino Mitsuaki) while Tōru Terasaki is portrayed by Tsuyoshi Hayashi (林 剛史, Hayashi Tsuyoshi).
  - Rabbit Imagin (ラビットイマジン, Rabitto Imajin): A namesake/"The Tortoise and the Hare"-themed Imagin with a twisted sense of humor who wields a pair of sickles. After forming a contract with an unnamed man, who wishes to fly, the Rabbit Imagin obliges by threatening to drop him from a great height. Upon fulfilling the contract, the former travels back in time to 2004, but is killed by Kamen Rider Den-O Axe Form. The Rabbit Imagin is voiced by Toshitsugu Takashina (高階 俊嗣, Takashina Toshitsugu) while the unnamed man is portrayed by Yasuhiko Imai (今井 靖彦, Imai Yasuhiko).
  - Anthopper Imagin (アントホッパーイマジン, Antohoppā Imajin): A pair of ant/grasshopper/"The Ant and the Grasshopper"-themed Imagin brothers consisting of the level-headed Ari, who wields a shovel-like sword, and the maniacal Kirigiris, who wields a viola-like sword. Working independently of Kai, they seek to kill Kamen Rider Den-O for themselves. In pursuit of this goal, they align themselves with bank manager Yuya Fujishiro (藤代 裕也, Fujishiro Yūya), but are killed by Kamen Riders Den-O Climax Form and Zeronos Altair Form. An additional instance of Ari also appears in the Hyper Battle DVD special Kamen Rider Den-O: Singing, Dancing, Great Training!!. Ari and Kirigiris are voiced by Kohsuke Toriumi (鳥海 浩輔, Toriumi Kōsuke) and Tomokazu Seki (関 智一, Seki Tomokazu) respectively while Yuya Fujishiro is portrayed by Shinsuke Akagi (赤木 伸輔, Akagi Shinsuke).
  - Kraken Imagin (クラーケンイマジン, Kurāken Imajin): A namesake-themed Imagin who possesses a hand gun and tentacles for a left hand. After forming a contract with an unnamed pianist, who wishes for a piano, the Kraken Imagin fulfills the request and travels back in time to 2004, only to be killed by Kamen Rider Den-O Rod Form. The Kraken Imagin is voiced by Tetsu Inada (稲田 徹, Inada Tetsu) while the unnamed pianist is portrayed by Taro Suwa (諏訪 太郎, Suwa Tarō).
  - Mole Imagin (モールイマジン, Mōru Imajin): A namesake/"Thumbelina"-themed Imagin sub-species capable of cloning themselves, with the differing offshoots possessing either axes, claws, or drills for hands. One group of Mole Imagin form a contract with Yamaguchi (山口) and travel back in time to 2000, but are killed by Kamen Riders Zeronos Zero Form and Den-O Liner Form. In the series finale, several New Mole Imagin (NEWモールイマジン, Nyū Mōru Imajin) wielding varying weapons serve in Kai's army. The Mole Imagin are voiced by Daisuke Kirii (桐井 大介, Kirii Daisuke), Kōichi Sakaguchi (坂口 候一, Sakaguchi Kōichi), and Akira Sasanuma (笹沼 晃, Sasanuma Akira) while Yamaguchi is portrayed by Yōichi Furuya (古屋 暢一, Furuya Yōichi).
  - Leo Imagin (レオイマジン, Reo Imajin): A lion/"The Coward and the Lion of Gold" (金のライオンを見つけた男, Kin no Raion o Mitsuketa Otoko)-themed Imagin and one of Kai's enforcers who commands Leo Soldiers (レオソルジャー Reo Sorujā) and possesses powerful claws on his right hand. The Leo Imagin initially tries to kill Ryutaros before Kai orders him to travel back in time to 2006, only to be killed by Kamen Rider Den-O Liner Form. The Leo Imagin is voiced by Kazuhiro Yamaji (山路 和弘, Yamaji Kazuhiro).
  - Panda Rabbit Imagin (パンダラビットイマジン, Panda Rabitto Imajin): A giant panda/rabbit/"The Tortoise and the Hare"-themed Imagin who wields a sword. After forming a contract with an unnamed man who wishes to join his favorite company, the Panda Rabbit Imagin obliges by dropping him through the roof before intending to travel back in time to 2006, only to be foiled by Kamen Rider Den-O Sword Form. The Panda Rabbit Imagin is voiced by Kōji Ochiai while the unnamed man is portrayed by Kosuke Takahashi (高橋 孝輔, Takahashi Kōsuke).
  - Snail Imagin (スネールイマジン, Sunēru Imajin): A namesake/"The Snail and the Rose Tree"-themed Imagin sub-species and Kai's servants. Kai sends a female whip-wielding Snail Imagin to form a contract with Yuto's unnamed teacher so she can travel back in time to 1993 to eliminate Sakurai's past self. After she seemingly succeeds and is killed by Kamen Rider Den-O Liner Form, Kai sends a male, pistol-wielding Snail Imagin to abduct Kohana and force Ryotaro to join him. However, Ryotaro refuses and Sakurai resurfaces alive. In response, Kai forms a contract with the second Snail Imagin to send him back in time to 1999 and complete the female instance's mission, only for the monster to be killed by Kamen Rider Zeronos Zero Form. Additionally, a second male Snail Imagin appears in the series finale as a minor member of Kai's army. The female Snail Imagin is voiced by Nanaho Katsuragi (葛城 七穂, Katsuragi Nanaho) while the male is voiced by Takashi Irie (入江 崇史, Irie Takashi). Additionally, the unnamed teacher is portrayed by Katsunori Abe (あべ かつのり, Abe Katsunori).
  - Oct Imagin (オクトイマジン, Okuto Imajin): An octopus/"The Octopus and the Skull"-themed Imagin sub-species that possess several tentacles capable of controlling inanimate objects and wields ink-based smoke bombs. After forming a contract with Shoko Hazuki (葉月 翔子, Hazuki Shōko), who wants Yuto to be brought to her alive, one instance of the Oct Imagin reluctantly obliges before traveling back in time to 2006 to kill Sakurai, only to be killed by Kamen Riders Den-O Liner Form and Zeronos Zero Form. Despite this, one of his tentacles enters the time stream, infects several time tracks, and transform them into a hydra-like monster, leading to the Station Master mobilizing an army of time trains to destroy them. Additionally, several instances of the Oct Imagin appear in the series finale as minor members of Kai's army. The Oct Imagin is voiced by Kenjiro Tsuda (津田 健次郎, Tsuda Kenjirō) while Shoko Hazuki is portrayed by Sora Matsumoto (松本 夏空, Matsumoto Sora).
  - Armadillo Imagin (アルマジロイマジン, Arumajiro Imajin): A namesake/"La Cancion del Armadillo"-themed Imagin and servant of Kai who possesses the ability to roll up into a ball and burrow underground and wields a mace. After forming a contract with Shirakaku member Ōsaki (大崎), the Armadillo Imagin travels back in time to 2005. After overpowering Kamen Riders Den-O and Zeronos, he stows away on the DenLiner to destroy a time station, only to be killed by Kamen Rider Den-O Climax Form. The Armadillo Imagin is voiced by Wataru Takagi (高木 渉, Takagi Wataru) while Ōsaki is portrayed by Yasuharu Miyahira (宮平 安春, Miyahira Yasuharu).
  - Albinoleo Imagin (アルビノレオイマジン, Arubinoreo Imajin): An albino "The Man Who Found a Gold Lion"-themed variant of the Leo Imagin and servant of Kai. He is sent back in time to 2007 to kill Airi, but the monster is killed by Kamen Riders Den-O Liner Form and Zeronos Zero Form as well as the latter's future self. The Albinoleo Imagin is voiced by Takaya Kuroda.
  - Snowman Imagin (スノーマンイマジン, Sunōman Imajin) A namesake/"Frosty the Snowman"-themed Imagin who wields a cane and possesses the ability to produce ice breath. After forming a contract with an unnamed store owner, who wishes to deplete his stock, the Snowman Imagin steals it and gives them out as Christmas presents before traveling back in time to 2007, only to be killed by Kamen Rider Den-O Liner Form. The Snowman Imagin is voiced by Tōru Ōkawa (大川 透, Ōkawa Tōru) while the unnamed store owner is portrayed by Ryo Ono (小野 了, Ono Ryō).
  - Other Imagin:
    - Death Imagin (デスイマジン, Desu Imajin): A namesake/"Death's Messengers" (死神使い, Shinigami Tsukai)-themed Imagin that wields a double-headed scythe and was created from Kai's memories, serving as an extension of his will, though his life is tied to Kai's. The Death Imagin and Kai are killed by Kamen Rider Den-O Sword Form via his allies' combined energies. The Death Imagin is voiced by Hiroshi Yanaka (家中 宏, Yanaka Hiroshi).
    - Molech Imagin (モレクイマジン, Moreku Imajin): A thorny devil/"We All Came From Eggs" (ご先祖様はみんな卵, Gosenzo-sama wa Minna Tamago)-themed Imagin sub-species. During the events of the film Kamen Rider Den-O: I'm Born!, one instance forms a contract with robber Hiroshi Katō (加藤 浩, Katō Hiroshi) to help Gaoh hijack the DenLiner before the Molech Imagin is killed by Kamen Rider Den-O. In the series finale, a second Molech Imagin appears as a member of Kai's army. The Molech Imagin is voiced by Hidenori Tokuyama (徳山 秀典, Tokuyama Hidenori) while Hiroshi Katō is portrayed by Toshihiro Ogura (おぐら としひろ, Ogura Toshihiro).
    - Bloodsucker Imagin (ブラッドサッカーイマジン, Buraddosakkā Imajin): A leech/"Leeches and Master Kobo" (ヒルと弘法大師, Hiru to Kōbō-Daishi)-themed Imagin who appears exclusively in the film Kamen Rider Den-O: I'm Born!. He forms a contract with Shōichi Ike (池 祥一, Ike Shōichi) to help Gaoh by distracting Kamen Rider Zeronos before he is killed by Kamen Rider Den-O Climax Form. The Bloodsucker Imagin is voiced by Nobuo Tobita (飛田 展男, Tobita Nobuo) Shōichi Ike is portrayed by Makoto Honda (本田 誠人, Honda Makoto).
    - Cobra Imagin (コブライマジン, Kobura Imagin): A namesake/"The Bear Fighting Hero"-themed Imagin sub-species. During the events of the film Kamen Rider Den-O: I'm Born!, one instance assists Gaoh in finding the GaohLiner and attempting to kill Ryotaro until he is killed by Kamen Rider Den-O Wing Form. In the series finale, a second Cobra Imagin appears as a member of Kai's army. The Cobra Imagin is voiced by Takashi Hagino (萩野 崇, Hagino Takashi).
    - Salamander Imagin (サラマンダーイマジン, Saramandā Imagin): A namesake/"An incarnation of the Death God Xolotl"-themed Imagin who appears exclusively in the film Kamen Rider Den-O: I'm Born!. He assists Gaoh in unearthing the GaohLiner and possesses a member of the Sanada Ten Braves until he is killed by Kamen Rider Den-O Rod Form. The Salamander Imagin is voiced by Masato Uchiyama (内山 眞人, Uchiyama Masato).
    - Gecko Imagin (ゲッコーイマジン, Gekkō Imajin): A namesake/"The Mystery of the Newt" (井守の怪, Imori no Kai)-themed Imagin sub-species. During the events of the film Kamen Rider Den-O: I'm Born!, one instance assists Gaoh before he is killed by Kamen Rider Den-O Gun Form. In the series finale and the film Saraba Kamen Rider Den-O: Final Countdown, multiple Gecko Imagin serve Kai and Shiro respectively. The Gecko Imagin is voiced by Kenichi Suzumura (鈴村 健一, Suzumura Ken'ichi).
    - Newt Imagin (ニュートイマジン, Nyūto Imajin): A namesake/"The Mystery of the Newt"-themed Imagin sub-species. During the events of the film Kamen Rider Den-O: I'm Born!, one instance assists Gaoh before he is killed by Kamen Rider Den-O Axe Form. In the series finale and the film Saraba Kamen Rider Den-O: Final Countdown, multiple Newt Imagin serve Kai and Shiro respectively. The Newt Imagin is voiced by Yasuka Saitō (齋藤 ヤスカ, Saitō Yasuka).
    - Pink Rabbit Imagin (ピンクラビットイマジン, Pinku Rabitto Imajin): A rabbit/"The Tortoise and the Hare"-themed Imagin who serves Negataros until they are killed by Ryutaros.
    - Clown Imagin (クラウンイマジン, Kuraun Imajin): A namesake/Pulcinella-themed Imagin who serves Negataros until they are killed by Kamen Rider Zeronos Vega Form. The Clown Imagin is voiced by Chihiro Suzuki.
    - Ghost Imagin (ゴーストイマジン, Gōsuto Imajin): A namesake-themed Imagin and one of Shiro's enforcers who possesses Ryotaro to force him to help facilitate his master's plans and appears exclusively in Saraba Kamen Rider Den-O: Final Countdown. In pursuit of this, the Ghost Imagin uses Ryotaro to transform into Kamen Rider Yuuki Skull Form before he is eventually separated from him and killed by Kamen Rider Den-O Climax Form. The Ghost Imagin is voiced by Hiroshi Kamiya (神谷 浩史, Kamiya Hiroshi).
    - Phantom Imagin (ファントムイマジン, Fantomu Imajin): A namesake-themed Imagin and servant of Shiro who is killed by Kamen Rider New Den-O and appears exclusively in Saraba Kamen Rider Den-O: Final Countdown. The Phantom Imagin is voiced by Takuma Takewaka (竹若 拓磨, Takewaka Takuma).
    - Shadow Imagin (シャドウイマジン, Shadō Imajin): A namesake/shadow person-themed Imagin and servant of Shiro who is killed by Kamen Rider New Den-O and appears exclusively in Saraba Kamen Rider Den-O: Final Countdown. The Shadow Imagin is voiced by Tomokazu Sugita (杉田 智和, Sugita Tomokazu).
    - Piggies Imagin (ピギーズイマジン, Pigīzu Imajin): A three-headed namesake/"The Three Little Pigs"-themed Imagin who appears exclusively in Episode Red of the Cho Den-O trilogy. Unlike other Imagin, the Piggies Imagin is three brothers who share one body, with the oldest brother serving as the dominant head, the middle brother as the right pauldron, and the youngest brother as the left pauldron. After forming a contract with Hiroshi Kikuchi (菊地 宏, Kikuchi Hiroshi), who seeks to impress Airi by rescuing her, the Piggies Imagin orchestrates a string of near-fatal incidents and sabotages the DenLiner to stop Kamen Rider Den-O from interfering. Eventually however, the Imagin gives up on the contract before they are killed by Kamen Rider Den-O Climax Form. In order from oldest to youngest, the Piggies Imagin is voiced by Kazuya Nakai (中井 和哉, Nakai Kazuya), Kohsuke Toriumi and Tetsuya Kakihara (柿原 徹也, Kakihara Tetsuya) while Hiroshi Kikuchi is portrayed by Hideo Nakaizumi (中泉 英雄, Nakaizumi Hideo).
    - Mantis Imagin (マンティスマジン, Mantisu Imajin): A namesake/The Mantis and the Moon-themed Imagin who appears exclusively in Episode Blue of the Cho Den-O trilogy. After forming a contract with Miku Uehara (上原 美来, Uehara Miku), who took her late grandmother for granted and wishes to spend more time with her, the Mantis Imagin steals a Rider Ticket (ライダーチケット, Raidā Chiketto) from the Time Terminal to help her travel back in time to days before her grandmother died. Despite successfully fulfilling the contract, the Mantis Imagin is killed by Kamen Rider New Den-O. The Mantis Imagin is voiced by Michie Tomizawa (富沢 美智恵, Tomizawa Michie) while Miku Uehara is portrayed by Yuko Takayama (高山 侑子, Takayama Yūko).
    - Turkey Imagin (七面鳥イマジン, Shichimenchō Imajin): A namesake/The Fighting Cocks and The Turkey-themed Imagin who appears exclusively in the non-canonical novel Novel: Kamen Rider Den-O: The Demon Dog of Tokyo World Tower. After forming a contract with a pet dog named Hisui (翡翠), who wishes to protect his human owner, Kensuke Aoto, the Turkey Imagin travels back in time to September 15, 2008 to warn Kensuke to avoid losing too much money before he is defeated by Kamen Rider Den-O Sword Form, transforms into a Gigandeath Heaven, and killed by the DenLiner.
    - Cat Imagin (キャットイマジン, Kyatto Imajin): The Turkey Imagin's namesake/"Puss in Boots"-themed subordinate who possesses super-speed and appears exclusively in the novel Novel: Kamen Rider Den-O: The Demon Dog of Tokyo World Tower. The Turkey Imagin tasks the Cat Imagin with distracting the Kamen Riders while the former tries to fulfill his contract holder's wish. Despite his powers, the Cat Imagin accidentally kills himself with Kamen Rider Den-O Sword Form's DenGasher.

== Spin-off characters ==
=== Negataros ===
Negataros (ネガタロス, Negatarosu) is an Oni/"Issun-bōshi"-themed Imagin, founder of the Negataros Corps, and evil counterpart of Momotaros who seeks to restore the Imagins' timeline and appears exclusively in the film Kamen Rider Den-O & Kiva: Climax Deka. Having survived Kai's death and obtained the means to become Kamen Rider Nega Den-O (仮面ライダーネガ電王, Kamen Raidā Nega Den'ō) and command the Nega DenLiner (ネガデンライナー, Nega Denrainā) bullet train, he leads other surviving Imagin in forming an alliance with a group of Fangires and mobsters, but is foiled by double agent Yuto and killed by Kamen Riders Den-O and Kiva.

Utilizing a Rider Pass in conjunction with his own Den-O Belt, Negataros can transform into Kamen Rider Nega Den-O. While transformed, he wields the Nega DenGasher (ネガデンガッシャー, Nega Dengasshā), which has a Gun Mode for performing the Nega Wild Shot (ネガワイルドショット, Nega Wairudo Shotto) Full Charge. His personal vehicle is the Machine Nega DenBird (マシンネガデンバード, Mashin Nega Denbādo) motorcycle.

Negataros is voiced by Hikaru Midorikawa (緑川 光, Midorikawa Hikaru).

=== Kotaro Nogami ===
Kotaro Nogami (野上 幸太郎, Nogami Kōtarō) is Ryotaro's arrogant future grandson who first appears in the film Saraba Kamen Rider Den-O: Final Countdown. He can transform into Kamen Rider New Den-O (仮面ライダーNEW電王, Kamen Raidā Nyū Den'ō) and rides the New DenLiner (NEWデンライナー, Nyū Denrainā) bullet train.

Utilizing a Rider Pass in conjunction with the New Den-O Belt (NEWデンオウベルト, Nyū Den'ō Beruto), Kotaro can transform into Kamen Rider New Den-O Strike Form (ストライクフォーム, Sutoraiku Fōmu). While transformed, he gains the ability to transform any allied Imagin into weapons for his use in combat, such as Teddy into the Macheteddy (マチェーテディ, Machētedi) pistol sword for performing the Counter Slash (カウンタースラッシュ, Kauntā Surasshu) Full Charge, Kintaros into the Kintaono (キンタオノ) battle axe, Urataros into the Uratazao (ウラタザオ) whip, or Momotaros into the Momotaken (モモタケン) flaming sword. He also carries his own DenGasher, which he primarily wields in Sword Mode if Teddy is unavailable, and can perform the Strike Spurt (ストライクスパート, Sutoraiku Supāto) Full Charge. His personal vehicle is the Machine New DenBird (マシンNEWデンバード, Mashin Nyū Denbādo) motorcycle.

During the events of the film Cho Kamen Rider Den-O & Decade Neo Generations: The Onigashima Warship, Kotaro assumes his own version of Vega Form while possessed by Deneb. In this form, he primarily wields the DenGasher in Naginata Mode (ナギナタモード, Naginata Mōdo), which allows him to perform the Brandish Dive (ブランディッシュダイブ, Burandisshu Daibu) Full Charge.

Kotaro Nogami is portrayed by Dori Sakurada (桜田 通, Sakurada Dōri).

=== Teddy ===
Neotaros (ネオタロス, Neotarosu), also known as Teddy (テディ, Tedi), is an Oni/Momotaros-themed Imagin and Kotaro's partner who first appears in the film Saraba Kamen Rider Den-O: Final Countdown. Unlike other Imagin, Teddy is based on Kotaro's memories of Ryotaro and Momotaros' exploits instead of a literary folktale.

Teddy is voiced by Daisuke Ono (小野 大輔, Ono Daisuke).

=== Shiro ===
Shiro (死郎, Shirō) is a necromancer capable of reviving Imagin and humans who can become Kamen Rider Yuuki (仮面ライダー幽汽, Kamen Raidā Yūki) and appears exclusively in the film Saraba Kamen Rider Den-O: Final Countdown. He seeks to revive his lover Sora by switching the inhabitants of the living world and the afterlife via the power of his skull-themed Ghost Train (幽霊列車, Yūrei Ressha) steam engine, which is capable of traveling to the latter world. In pursuit of his goals, he kidnaps Ryotaro to utilize his Singularity Point status to travel through time. However, he is foiled by Kamen Riders Den-O Sword and Liner Form and New Den-O.

Utilizing a Rider Pass in conjunction with the Yuuki Belt (ユウキベルト, Yūki Beruto), Shiro can transform into Kamen Rider Yuuki Hijack Form (ハイジャックフォーム, Haijakku Fōmu). While transformed, he wields the SavageGasher (サヴェジガッシャー, Savejigasshā) sword, which allows him to perform his own version of the Terminate Flash, along with a whip and exploding tops.

Shiro is portrayed by Yu-ki Matsumura (松村 雄基, Matsumura Yūki).

=== Kamen Rider G Den-O ===
Kamen Rider G Den-O (仮面ライダーG電王, Kamen Raidā Ji Den'ō) is a police officer/police car-themed moniker shared by Reiji Kurosaki and his Imagin partner Eve who appear exclusively in Episode Yellow of the Cho Den-O trilogy. They utilize a Rider Pass in conjunction with the G Den-O Belt (Gデンオウベルト, Jī Den'ō Beruto) to transform and wield their own DenGasher, which has a Gun Mode for performing the World Punish (ワールドパニッシュ, Wārudo Panisshu) Full Charge and a Jitte Mode (十手モード, Jitte Mōdo) for performing the World End (ワールドエンド, Wārudo Endo) Full Charge.

==== Reiji Kurosaki ====
Reiji Kurosaki (黒崎 レイジ, Kurosaki Reiji) is an officer of the Time Police (時間警察, Jikan Keisatsu) who has an uneasy relationship with his mother Sayuri Mizushima (水島 さゆり, Mizushima Sayuri). After being abandoned by his mother and Daiki Kaito steals a Kurosaki family heirloom, the combination of these tragedies led him to distrust humans and rely solely on Eve as both his moral support and mission partner. He arrests Kaito and the DenLiner crew for disrupting the timeline in 2008, but Kaito recovers Sayuri's letter to prove her love for her son. Reiji's hesitance leads to Eve going rogue and hijacking G Den-O. Nonetheless, Reiji reconciles with Kaito, providing him with a K-Touch to defeat Eve before visiting his mother's flower shop.

Reiji Kurosaki is portrayed by Yuta Furukawa (古川 雄大, Furukawa Yūta) and Waku Sakaguchi (坂口 湧久, Sakaguchi Waku) as a child.

==== Eve ====
Eve (イブ, Ibu) is an artificial Imagin who was created by the Time Police to serve as Reiji's aide. Lacking a corporeal form, Eve resides in a Rider Pass and G Den-O's dobermann-like breastplate to supply Reiji with his abilities of time travel, near-future prediction and compensating for his blind spots in combat. When Reiji starts to show emotions, Eve hijacks the G Den-O form for his own and contemplates ruling the timeline through an army of artificial Imagin before he is defeated by Kamen Rider Diend Complete Form.

Eve is voiced by Hiroki Takahashi (高橋 広樹, Takahashi Hiroki).

=== Kensuke Aoto ===
Kensuke Aoto (青砥 健介, Aoto Kensuke) is a wealthy gambler who appears exclusively in the non-canonical novel Novel: Kamen Rider Den-O: The Demon Dog of Tokyo World Tower. Due to his ability to "read the future" and gambling away his wealth during a financial crisis in 2008, he becomes apathetic to everyone around him. In 2013, he attempts to demolish the Milk Dipper and the surrounding area to make way for the Tokyo World Tower skyscraper to rival the Tokyo Skytree. However, the Turkey Imagin travels back in time to prevent Kensuke from losing his money.

=== Kajiwara Kagetoki ===
Kajiwara Kagetoki (梶原 景時) is a fictionalized version of the historical figure of the same name and a Time Jacker who appears exclusively in the novel Novel: Kamen Rider Den-O: Deneb Kanjinchō. He travels to the Heian period of Japan.
