= Cho Kamen Rider Den-O & Decade Neo Generations: The Onigashima Warship =

Japanese name
- Kanji: 劇場版 超・仮面ライダー電王&ディケイド NEOジェネレーションズ 鬼ヶ島の戦艦
Transcriptions
- Revised Hepburn: Gekijōban Chō Kamen Raidā Den'ō Ando Dikeido Neo Jenerēshonzu Onigashima no Senkan
- Directed by: Ryuta Tasaki
- Written by: Yasuko Kobayashi
- Produced by: Ishimori Productions; Toei
- Starring: Dori Sakurada; Masahiro Inoue; Kimito Totani; Takuya Mizoguchi; Ruka Sawaki; Akina Minami
- Music by: Toshihiko Sahashi
- Distributed by: Toei Co. Ltd
- Release date: May 1, 2009
- Running time: 80 minutes; 86 minutes (Director's Cut)
- Country: Japan
- Language: Japanese

Cho Kamen Rider Den-O & Decade Neo Generations the Movie: The Onigashima Warship (劇場版 超・仮面ライダー電王&ディケイド NEOジェネレーションズ 鬼ヶ島の戦艦, Gekijōban Chō Kamen Raidā Den'ō Ando Dikeido Neo Jenerēshonzu Onigashima no Senkan; Super Masked Rider Den-O & Decade Neo Generations the Movie: The Onigashima Warship) is the fourth tokusatsu superhero film adaptation of the popular Kamen Rider Series Kamen Rider Den-O, following Kamen Rider Den-O: I'm Born!, Kamen Rider Den-O & Kiva: Climax Deka, and Saraba Kamen Rider Den-O: Final Countdown. The Onigashima Warship is the first of the films to be part of the Cho-Den-O Series, a new multimedia franchise featuring the characters of Den-O and many new characters. It opened in theaters on May 1, 2009. In its first week in theaters, it opened at #4, after GOEMON at #3, Red Cliff Part II at #2, and Detective Conan: The Raven Chaser at #1. Like its previous film Kamen Rider Den-O & Kiva: Climax Deka, its plot focuses more on Cho Den-O, although the characters of Decade give support to them.

== Plot ==
Kamen Rider Den-O's Super Climax Form debuts in this film, seen here at a pre-release press conference.

Taking place after the events of Kamen Rider Decade episode 15, under the impression that they saved the World of Den-O, Tsukasa Kadoya and company begin their journey to the World of Kabuto when they are halted by Sieg who presents them a manuscript that detailed the legendary Oni Conquest with Momotaros' image on it. As this occurred, the Tarōs mysteriously vanish from the DenLiner as they are about to help Kotaro Nogami out with the true threat to their world.

Meanwhile, in the year 1980, a boy named Yu encounters Mimihiko and then Yu is possessed by Deneb who gets him away from the Gelnewts before New Den-O arrives to cover his escape. Deneb then brings Yu to Ryotaro, revealing Mimihiko to be one of the Oni of legend and is searching for the Trump Stone (切り札の石, Kirifuda no Ishi) which Yu possesses. Seeing Yu reluctant to give them the item, Ryotaro leaves him with a DenLiner admission ticket should he change his mind. The next day, Yu runs off after learns that his father wants him to leave with him. Learning he is hunted by the Gelnewts, Yu tries to outrun the monsters on his bike before managing to reach the sands of time where the DenLiner is waiting for him. Giving them the Trump Stone, Yu wishes to be remain on the train. Though Owner warns him their intent to go back in time to fight the Oni, Yu refuses to turn back. After Yu is informed on the effects the distortions had on Ryotaro and Yuto, the former regressed to a child while the latter has mysteriously disappeared, the DenLiner arrives at the Junction Point where they meet the Station Master who reveals a 1936 newspaper revealing that Urataros, Kintaros, and Ryutaros are making a living as rice thieves in the bodies of another trio named Jiro, Ramon, and Riki (the Arms Monsters of Kamen Rider Kiva). During that time, the kids find Tsukasa who offers his aid. Kotaro is reluctant to accept his help until Tsukasa reveals the scroll Sieg brought with him that has Momotaros on it.

Arriving in the Muromachi period, DenLiner gang arrive and defeat the Gelnewts, meeting Toki and joining her at the village's pleas. Once at Onigashima, New Den-O and the villagers catch the Gelnewts off guard as the kids find Momotaros. Deneb asks Yu to form a contract with him, at least until Yuto returns, to be able to assist the others in. Den-O and Deneb join the fray as Kuchihiko arrives and assumes his Rider form Goludora. During the fight, Toki takes a hit meant for Yu before New Den-O is defeated. Using Kotaro as a bargaining chip, Goludora gives them a day to accept his demands for both the Trump Stone and the DenLiner. The next day, after planning it out, the DenLiner gang gives up both the Trump Stone and the DenLiner. Once the Owner and Naomi are evicted, Kuchihiko ditches Kotaro as he enters the DenLiner to reach his brother in the present time period. However, his journey is staged as the evicted "Owner" is the Station Master in disguise as the real Owner pulled the emergency break as everyone else has erected a massive set designed to look like modern Tokyo. Once the DenLiner staff and the Station Master enter the train, with Kohana guarding the door, Den-O, the Tarōs, and New Den-O battle Goludora and the Gelnewts with Toki providing backup, until she is wounded in battle.

However, Diend appears long enough to summon Kamen Riders Ouja, G3 and Caucasus as wild cards in the fight and Kuchihiko reassembles the Oni's Trump Stone with Mimihiko activating the Demon's Warship in the present and using it to return to the past. The Oni Brothers are able to defeat them until Tsukasa and Sieg arrive, allowing Den-O to assume Wing form as Momotaros possess Tsukasa to fight as Decade. The other Tarōs do the same with Diend's summoned Riders (Urataros with G3, Kintaros with Caucasus and Ryutaros with Ouja) while Deneb enters Kotaro, enabling Kamen Rider New Den-O to assume Vega Form. Helping Toki fire her arrow, Yu manages to break the Demon's Warship's anchor to give the Kamen Riders time to set up a way to end the fight. At Decade's suggestion, Ryotaro forms Kamen Rider Den-O Super Climax Form with the Tarōs and Sieg. Cho-Den-O and Decade manage to overwhelm the Oni Brothers with New Den-O Vega Form and Teddy's aid. After Shilubara sacrifices himself to protect his brother, an enraged Goludora enters the Warship and engages the DenLiner in a battle with Decade taking his leave as the DenLiner gang manages to sink the Warship from the inside out as Kamen Rider Den-O Sword Form finishes Goludora off with a new Rider Kick attack. Soon after, Yu bids farewell to Toki as she is revealed to be his ancestor. Though offered a slight detour before they return to present, Yu turns it down as he wants to be back in his time. After they part ways, Deneb is dropped back in 2009 where he finds Yuto waiting for him, where he reveals that he went by the name Yu as a child and they return to the ZeroLiner.

== Pre-production and casting ==
Initially scheduled to be released in April 2009, Toei later announced that the film would be included in the new Cho-Den-O Series. The first new cast member to be announced was gravure idol Akina Minami. The cast members of Den-O to return include the voice actors of the Tarōs, Sieg, and Deneb, as well as the actors portraying Naomi, Kohana, and Owner, among others (Toshihiko Seki, Kōji Yusa, Masaki Terasoma, Kenichi Suzumura, Shin-ichiro Miki, Hōchū Ōtsuka, Rina Akiyama, Tamaki Matsumoto, Yuichi Nakamura, and Kenjirō Ishimaru). Also to be featured in the film are several cast members of the current Kamen Rider Series Kamen Rider Decade and some of the cast members of Kamen Rider Kiva.

== Characters ==
Yu (ユウ, Yū)
Yu is a young boy who, along with his grandmother, encounters the Oni Brothers and then Ryotaro. While his father is on business in foreign countries and his mother dead while he is away, Yu is sent to the countryside to live with his grandmother where he does not make many friends in school. He encounters the Oni Brothers when they come to the countryside to steal the Trump Stone. He joins the DenLiner crew when he forms a contract with Deneb so the Imagin can help fight the Oni Brothers. During the epilogues, it is later revealed that Yu is actually Yuto Sakurai as a child.
Toki (トキ)
Toki is the protector of the Trump Stone during the Muromachi period, protecting from it the Oni Brothers with her master archery skills. She is the ancestor of Yu's mother.
Chiyoko Shimizu (清水 千代子, Shimizu Chiyoko)
Chiyoko is Yu's maternal grandmother and his legal guardian.
Yasushi (ヤスシ), Akira (アキラ), Kenji (ケンジ)
Yu's classmates who make fun of him because he is from Tokyo, and doesn't like mud and bugs.

=== Oni Clan ===
The movie's antagonists are the two brothers of the Oni Clan (オニ一族, Oni Ichizoku) based on Onigashima, who both use the Gelnewt (ゲルニュート, Gerunyūto) Mirror Monsters as their foot soldiers when they came into their world from the World of Ryuki. They travel through time using the colossal legendary Oni's Warship (鬼の戦艦, Oni no Senkan) It is several hundred times larger than the DenLiner, and is armed with torpedoes and harpoons. It is protected by a special barrier so no unwanted visitors can reach the deck. Because of their machinations in the past, they are behind the radical changes occurring to the World of Den-O. Furthermore, the distortions enable them to assume Kamen Rider-like forms.

==== Goludora ====
The older Oni Brother Kuchihiko (クチヒコ), armed with Golden Shakujō (黄金の錫杖, Ōgon no Shakujō), which also enables his transformation into the golden grasshopper-like Goludora (ゴルドラ, Gorudora). He commands Mimihiko to travel back in time to steal items to further his agenda to control all of time and space by rewriting the legend of Onigashima. But in the end, his plans are ruined by the group effort of the Kamen Riders as he is destroyed by Kamen Rider Den-O as the battleship sinks.

==== Shilubara ====
The younger Oni Brother Mimihiko (ミミヒコ) is armed with the Silvery Kanabō (純銀の金棒, Jungin no Kanabō), which also enables his transformation into the silvery dragonfly-like Shilubara (シルバラ, Shirubara). He briefly appears in Kamen Rider Decade in the World of Den-O to acquire the vase for his brother's agenda, getting it while Decade and Den-O are distracted with their fight as New Den-O arrives to stop Shilubara before he took the item back in time. He later travels to 1980 to steal the Trump Stone, but is forced to wait for his brother to acquire it in their time. Once the Trump is complete, Mimihiko pilots the Demon's Warship back into the past where he sacrifices himself to save his brother from Cho-Den-O's attack.

== Cast ==
- Kotaro Nogami (野上 幸太郎, Nogami Kōtarō): Dori Sakurada (桜田 通, Sakurada Dōri)
- Tsukasa Kadoya (門矢 士, Kadoya Tsukasa): Masahiro Inoue (井上 正大, Inoue Masahiro)
- Daiki Kaito (海東 大樹, Kaitō Daiki): Kimito Totani (戸谷 公人, Totani Kimito)
- Toki (トキ): Akina Minami (南 明奈, Minami Akina)
- Yu (ユウ, Yū): Ruka Sawaki (沢木 ルカ, Sawaki Ruka)
- Naomi (ナオミ): Rina Akiyama (秋山 莉奈, Akiyama Rina)
- Natsumi Hikari (光 夏海, Hikari Natsumi): Kanna Mori (森 カンナ, Mori Kanna)
- Ryotaro Nogami (野上 良太郎, Nogami Ryōtarō): Takuya Mizoguchi (溝口 琢矢, Mizoguchi Takuya)
- Kohana (コハナ): Tamaki Matsumoto (松元 環季, Matsumoto Tamaki)
- Jiro (次狼, Jirō): Kenji Matsuda (松田 賢二, Matsuda Kenji)
- Ramon (ラモン): Yuuki Ogoe (小越 勇輝, Ogoe Yūki)
- Riki (力): Eiji Takigawa (滝川 英治, Takigawa Eiji)
- Yuto Sakurai (桜井 侑斗, Sakurai Yūto): Yuichi Nakamura (中村 優一, Nakamura Yūichi)
- Kuchihiko (クチヒコ): Eisuke Sasai (篠井 英介, Sasai Eisuke)
- Mimihiko (ミミヒコ): Shingo Yanagisawa (柳沢 慎吾, Yanagisawa Shingo)
- Owner (オーナー, Ōnā), Station Master (駅長, Ekichō): Kenjirō Ishimaru (石丸 謙二郎, Ishimaru Kenjirō)
- Eijiro Hikari (光 栄次郎, Hikari Eijirō): Renji Ishibashi (石橋 蓮司, Ishibashi Renji)
- Chiyoko Shimizu (清水 千代子, Shimizu Chiyoko): Tomiko Ishii (石井 トミコ, Ishii Tomiko)
- Yasushi (ヤスシ): Shoma Yashiro (矢代 奨馬, Yashiro Shōma)
- Akira (アキラ): Kiyotaka Yamada (山田 清貴, Yamada Kiyotaka)
- Kenji (ケンジ): Oki Fujimoto (藤本 旺輝, Fujimoto Ōki)
- Anglers: Taro Suruga (駿河 太郎, Suruga Tarō), Yuta Owada (大和田 悠太, Ōwada Yūta), Kenzo Ryu (笠 兼三, Ryū Kenzō)
- Samurais: Kenji Tominaga (富永 研司, Tominaga Kenji), Jiro Okamoto (岡元 次郎, Okamoto Jirō)
- Villagers: Naoki Nagase (永瀬 尚希, Nagase Naoki), Toshihiro Ogura (おぐら としひろ, Ogura Toshihiro), Shinichi Kaneda (金田 進一, Kaneda Shinichi)

=== Voice actors ===
- Momotaros (モモタロス, Momotarosu): Toshihiko Seki (関 俊彦, Seki Toshihiko)
- Urataros (ウラタロス, Uratarosu): Kōji Yusa (遊佐 浩二, Yusa Kōji)
- Kintaros (キンタロス, Kintarosu): Masaki Terasoma (てらそま まさき, Terasoma Masaki)
- Ryutaros (リュウタロス, Ryūtarosu): Kenichi Suzumura (鈴村 健一, Suzumura Ken'ichi)
- Deneb (デネブ, Denebu): Hōchū Ōtsuka (大塚 芳忠, Ōtsuka Hōchū)
- Sieg (ジーク, Jīku): Shin-ichiro Miki (三木 眞一郎, Miki Shin'ichirō)
- Teddy (テディ, Tedi): Daisuke Ono (小野 大輔, Ono Daisuke)
- Gelnewt (ゲルニュート, Gerunyūto): Nobuyuki Hiyama (檜山 修之, Hiyama Nobuyuki), Kōsuke Toriumi (鳥海 浩輔, Toriumi Kōsuke)
- Kamen Rider G3 (仮面ライダーG3, Kamen Raidā Jī Surī), Gelnewt: Yoshimasa Tanno (丹野 宜政, Tanno Yoshimasa)
- DecaDriver Voice, DienDriver Voice: Mark Okita (マーク・大喜多, Māku Ōkita)

== Songs ==
Theme song

- "Cho Climax Jump" (超 Climax Jump, Chō Kuraimakkusu Janpu)
  - Lyrics: Shoko Fujibayashi
  - Composition & Arrangement: Shuhei Naruse
  - Artist: Den-O All Stars (電王オールスターズ, Den'ō Ōru Sutāzu): Momotaros (Toshihiko Seki), Urataros (Kōji Yusa), Kintaros (Masaki Terasoma), Ryutaros (Kenichi Suzumura), Teddy (Daisuke Ono), the Owner (Kenjirō Ishimaru), Kotaro Nogami (Dori Sakurada), Naomi (Rina Akiyama), and Kohana (Tamaki Matsumoto)
