= Saraba Kamen Rider Den-O: Final Countdown =

Saraba Kamen Rider Den-O the Movie: Final Countdown

Japanese name
- Kanji: 劇場版 さらば仮面ライダー電王 ファイナル・カウントダウン
Transcriptions
- Revised Hepburn: Gekijōban Saraba Kamen Raidā Den'ō Fainaru Kauntodaun
- Directed by: Osamu Kaneda
- Written by: Yasuko Kobayashi
- Produced by: Ishimori Productions; Toei
- Starring: Dori Sakurada; Takeru Satoh; Yuichi Nakamura; Sayaka Kanda; Tamaki Matsumoto; Rina Akiyama; Kenjirō Ishimaru; Yu-ki Matsumura
- Cinematography: Fumio Matsumura
- Edited by: Ren Sato
- Music by: Toshihiko Sahashi; Shuhei Naruse
- Production company: Toei
- Distributed by: Toei Co. Ltd
- Release date: October 4, 2008
- Running time: 83 minutes; 92 minutes (Director's Cut)
- Country: Japan
- Language: Japanese

Saraba Kamen Rider Den-O the Movie: Final Countdown (劇場版 さらば仮面ライダー電王 ファイナル・カウントダウン, Gekijōban Saraba Kamen Raidā Den'ō Fainaru Kauntodaun, Farewell, Masked Rider Den-O The Movie: Final Countdown) is the third tokusatsu superhero film adaptation of the popular Kamen Rider Series Kamen Rider Den-O, and the last of the Den-O films, following Kamen Rider Den-O: I'm Born! and Kamen Rider Den-O & Kiva: Climax Deka. The script was written by Yasuko Kobayashi and directed by Osamu Kaneda, both of which have worked on the previous Den-O films. Final Countdown was released on October 4, 2008. As of September 26, the film has sold 66,000 pre-sale tickets. It opened at #2 in Japanese theaters on its opening weekend only behind The Devotion of Suspect X. The film was originally intended to be the end of Den-O, until the development of the Cho-Den-O Series.

== Plot ==
Taking place after the events of series, the Tarōs and Kohana go out of the DenLiner for a day to visit Ryotaro and Airi. However, they see the mysterious Ghost Train that has been mentioned in urban legends as Momotaros and gang are then attacked by two evil Imagin and Kamen Rider Yuuki Skull Form. During the fight, it is revealed to the Tarōs that Yuuki is none other than Ryotaro possessed by an evil Imagin. Even with Zeronos coming to the gang's aid, things seem bleak until a blue DenLiner appears with a new figure: Kamen Rider New Den-O.

After destroying the Shadow Imagin, with Yuuki and the Phantom Imagin retreating to the Ghost Train, the gang is brought onto the New DenLiner. There, Owner formally introduces the new Rider as Kotaro Nogami, Ryotaro's grandson from the future, and his Imagin Teddy. After Owner reveals he summoned Kotaro in response to a threat posed by the Ghost Train and its owner Shiro, who seeks to use the Ghost Train to reverse the worlds of the living and the dead. After Kotaro explains to Momotaros that he intends to pick up the slack for his grandfather, whom he has no respect for, he goes after the Ghost Train by himself as New Den-O to fight Yuuki after killing the Phantom Imagin until Shiro arrives and defeats New Den-O personally. Yuuki is about to kill Kotaro when Ryotaro attempts to regain control over his actions as the Taros arrive. Although Shiro and Yuuki escape, the New DenLiner crew get a Rider Ticket and a partial message from Ryotaro to Momotaros about protecting an "elephant" that leads them to where Shiro intends to carry out his plan: May 23, 1729.

There, the New DenLiner gang learn they have reinforcements in both Sieg and then Deneb, who join up with the gang in Yuto's stead as he is still injured from the fight with Yuuki. After looking for clues, encountering people who resemble Airi, Ozaki, and Miura, and unable to find any elephant except a traditional drawing of one in the middle of the town taken from a future point in time, the rest of the group questions whether or not Momotaros heard things right. During their dinner, Kotaro takes his leave as Momotaros follows him in an attempt to talk to him about how he strong is like his grandfather, but Kotaro has yet to see his grandfather in any way resembling someone "strong".

Later that night, Teddy discovers Shiro's plan to kill everyone in the village the next day, but is found out and attacked. He struggles back to their base of operations so his friends will know and says how the "elephant" is not really an elephant. Although New Den-O is without his partner and Yuto is still injured, Momotaros decides to get Ryotaro back even if it is the last thing he does. The next day, the other Tarōs and Deneb battle the mercenaries as Momotaros fights his way to Yuuki, attempting to call out of Ryotaro to fight his possessor before getting a mortal wound from Yuuki to his friends' horror. But at the last second, Ryotaro regains control as Momotaros enters his body and drives the Ghost Imagin out of him. Assuming Climax Form, Den-O easily takes out the Ghost Imagin as Shiro takes the Yuuki Belt and assumes Yuuki Hijack Form as he uses his necromancy to summon every Imagin the Riders have ever faced back from the dead.

After Climax Form is defeated, a fully healed Yuto and Kohana arrive via the ZeroLiner and New DenLiner, with Kohana giving the Tarōs and Sieg Den-O Belts with Rider Passes. The Imagin each assume their Den-O form as Ryotaro becomes Liner Form and Yuto becomes Zero Form. While the others battle the Imagin, Liner Form, Sword Form, and later New Den-O pursue Yuuki on horseback. Together, the three Den-O's mortally wound Yuuki who reverts to Shiro. Sora arrives, revealing to everyone else that she had been dead for 400 years and did not wish to be alive again, only to be with Shiro for eternity. Accepting his fate, Shiro and Sora board the Ghost Train to be together forever in the realm of the dead.

When the New DenLiner arrives in the middle of town to pick up the gang, Naomi questions being out in the open while the Owner reveals that the locals will only recognize it as an elephant. Ryotaro also reveals that he was aware of the "elephant" as it was the point in time where his ancestor Oyuki finds her true love. It is this point in history that Shiro planned to negate, preventing Ryotaro from ever existing and allowing him to bring Sora and everyone else who had died back to life. With his mission complete, Kotaro gains a new respect for his grandfather as he and Teddy are brought back to their time via the DenLiner, where they meet up with the elderly Ryotaro of their future.

== Pre-production ==
A third film for Kamen Rider Den-O was initially announced on the Animate Online Store as part of a listing for a set of trading cards to promote the movie. The film was subsequently listed on various upcoming film lists, including those at AOL Japan's Entertainment page. These listings were soon removed, and the website "saraba-den-o.jp" appeared with a countdown timer to the website's official opening.

=== Casting ===
The film features Dori Sakurada, Sayaka Kanda and Yu-ki Matsumura and the voices of Hiroshi Kamiya and Daisuke Ono. Shin-ichiro Miki reprises his role as the voice of the Imagin Sieg, having been absent from Kamen Rider Den-O & Kiva: Climax Deka. Takeru Satoh, Yuichi Nakamura, Rina Akiyama, Wakana Matsumoto, Tamaki Matsumoto, Kenjirō Ishimaru, Toshihiko Seki, Kōji Yusa, Masaki Terasoma, Kenichi Suzumura, and Hōchū Ōtsuka all reprise their roles from the series.

== Characters ==
=== Movie-exclusive characters ===
- Shiro/Kamen Rider Yuuki (死郎/仮面ライダー幽汽, Shirō/Kamen Raidā Yūki): Shiro is a man who attempts to alter time to switch the worlds of the living and the dead through the Ghost Train as Ryotaro's abduction allows it to transverse time like the DenLiner. He has an obsession with Sora and cannot bring himself to do anything that he perceives would make her cry. Shiro is a master of necromancy and can revive Imagin and humans alike.
- Sora (ソラ): Sora is Shiro's true love who died 400 years ago. Her restless spirit remains within the Ghost Train as Shiro attempts to bring her back to life.
- Oyuki (お雪): Oyuki is Ryotaro's ancestor who resembles (and is portrayed by the same actress as) his older sister Airi. Her meeting with a samurai wearing a fukaamigasa (深編み笠) is a predestined event which Shiro attempts to destroy.
- Seikichi (成吉): Seikichi is a young man who resembles (and is portrayed by the same actor as) Seigi Ozaki, who is vying for the hand of Oyuki, much like his present counterpart.
- Issei (一成): Issei is a young man who resembles (and is portrayed by the same actor as) Issē Miura, who is vying for the hand of Oyuki, much like his present counterpart.

== Kamen Rider Yuuki ==
Other than New Den-O, the movie also introduces Kamen Rider Yuuki (仮面ライダー幽汽, Kamen Raidā Yūki), an evil Kamen Rider who has control over the Ghost Train (幽霊列車, Yūrei Ressha), a skull-faced steam-engine that transcends the world of the dead and the flow of time. By using the Rider Pass (ライダーパス, Raidā Pasu) and the Yuuki Belt (ユウキベルト, Yūki Beruto), A-Ryotaro and Shiro are able to transform into Yuuki. Yuuki is visually based on a pirate and a killer whale. The armor has an aged appearance, with rust and numerous scratches dotting its surface, keeping with the overall theme of death along with elements of the samurai and steam trains.

=== Skull Form ===
Skull Form (スカルフォーム, Sukaru Fōmu) is the form of Yuuki that is accessed when Ryotaro Nogami is possessed by the Ghost Imagin and uses said Imagin's sword. In Skull Form, Yuuki's Full Charge attack is the Terminate Flash (ターミネイトフラッシュ, Tāmineito Furasshu) using the sword of the Ghost Imagin. As the name and design implies, Skull Form's motif is the skeleton.

=== Hijack Form ===
Hijack Form (ハイジャックフォーム, Haijakku Fōmu) is the form of Kamen Rider Yuuki that Shiro accesses on his own. Hijack Form has a black and red color scheme, compared to Skull Form's black and gold color scheme, lacking the skull-theme, and gaining a mechanical-looking gauntlet on his left arm. Hijack Form also performs the Terminate Flash, but does so with his Savage Gasher (サヴェジガッシャー, Saveji Gasshā) sword, in itself a 7-piece modified DenGasher. This form also uses exploding tops in combat that can be multiplied using Shiro's whip

== Momotaros Forever! ==
The animated short Imagin Anime: Momotaros Forever! -Imagin Terminal Station-/The Movie (イマジンあにめ「モモタロスよ永遠に－イマジン終着駅－/劇場版」, Imajin Anime Momotarosu yo Eien ni -Imajin Shūchakueki-/Gekijōban) was shown as a double feature. In the short, Momotaros feels bad that it is really the end of Kamen Rider Den-O as Urataros assures him that all good stories have to end sometime. After Kintaros and Ryutaros try to make sequels to classic stories that cannot have a sequel, the Imagin end up on the moon in homage to Galaxy Express 999, embracing their final story (although some feel uncomfort to their new surrounding) . But a later retelling of this short, Be Forever Momotaros: Imagin Terminal Station (モモタロスよ永遠に ～イマジン終着駅, Momotarosu yo Towa ni ~Imajin Shūchakueki), provides an alternate ending where the story does continue with numerous new characters and Momotaros freaks out about it.

== Soundtrack ==
AAA and the Tarōs' voice actors also released a mini-album titled Ī jan! Ī jan! Sugē jan!? (いーじゃん！いーじゃん！スゲーじゃん!?, It's Good! It's Great! Isn't it Awesome!?) which included several new arrangements of the television series' theme song "Climax Jump" including "Climax Jump the Final" performed by AAA DEN-O form and arrangements for each of the initial forms of Den-O ("Climax Jump Sword form," "Rod form," et al.) each with another version of the song containing pieces of dialogue from the movie for that character. Also included is the track "Climax Jump Piano form" and the DVD edition has music clips of the four "Climax Jump" arrangements as well as a video titled "Climax Jump Epilogue." A track titled "Climax Jump the Final DEN-LINER form" was initially slated to be included on the mini-album.

The film's soundtrack was released by Avex Movie on November 26, 2008, with Toshihiko Sahashi composing, as he did for the series.

== Cast ==
- Kotaro Nogami (野上 幸太郎, Nogami Kōtarō): Dori Sakurada (桜田 通, Sakurada Dōri)
- Ryotaro Nogami (野上 良太郎, Nogami Ryōtarō): Takeru Satoh (佐藤 健, Satō Takeru)
- Yuto Sakurai (桜井 侑斗, Sakurai Yūto): Yuichi Nakamura (中村 優一, Nakamura Yūichi)
- Kohana (コハナ): Tamaki Matsumoto (松元 環季, Matsumoto Tamaki)
- Naomi (ナオミ): Rina Akiyama (秋山 莉奈, Akiyama Rina)
- Owner (オーナー, Ōnā): Kenjirō Ishimaru (石丸 謙二郎, Ishimaru Kenjirō)
- Sora (ソラ): Sayaka Kanda (神田 沙也加, Kanda Sayaka)
- Shiro (死郎, Shirō): Yu-ki Matsumura (松村 雄基, Matsumura Yūki)
- Airi Nogami (野上 愛理, Nogami Airi), Oyuki (お雪): Wakana Matsumoto (松本 若菜, Matsumoto Wakana)
- Seigi Ozaki (尾崎 正義, Ozaki Seigi), Seikichi (正吉): Akira Nagata (永田 彬, Nagata Akira) of RUN&GUN
- Issē Miura (三浦 イッセー, Miura Issē), Issei (一成): Ryo Ueno (上野 亮, Ueno Ryō)
- Samurai with Fukaamigasa (深編み笠の侍, Fukaamigasa no Samurai): Tomonobu Okano (岡野 友信, Okano Tomonobu)
- Ladies (おばさん, Obasan): Kaoru Mizuki (水木 薫, Mizuki Kaoru), Kazuki Miyagawa (宮川 佳寿姫, Miyagawa Kazuki)
- Old Lady (ばあさん, Bāsan): Mitsuko Abe (阿部 光子, Abe Mitsuko)
- Carpenter (大工, Daiku): Kinzo Sakura (桜 金造, Sakura Kinzō)
- Salaryman (サラリーマン, Sararīman): Kenji Nagae (長江 健次, Nagae Kenji)
- Girl (娘, Musume): Minami Tsukui (佃井 皆美, Tsukui Minami)
- Trackmen (保線員, Hosenin): Hikaru Takahashi (高橋 光, Takahashi Hikaru), Naoki Nagase (永瀬 尚希, Nagase Naoki)
- Female Bandit (女山賊, Onna Sanzoku): Ayumi Shimozono (下園 愛弓, Shimozono Ayumi)
- Ryotaro of Future (未来の良太郎, Mirai no Ryōtarō): Tadao Asai (浅井 忠雄, Asai Tadao)

=== Voice actors ===
- Momotaros (モモタロス, Momotarosu): Toshihiko Seki (関 俊彦, Seki Toshihiko)
- Urataros (ウラタロス, Uratarosu): Kōji Yusa (遊佐 浩二, Yusa Kōji)
- Kintaros (キンタロス, Kintarosu): Masaki Terasoma (てらそま まさき, Terasoma Masaki)
- Ryutaros (リュウタロス, Ryūtarosu): Kenichi Suzumura (鈴村 健一, Suzumura Ken'ichi)
- Deneb (デネブ, Denebu): Hōchū Ōtsuka (大塚 芳忠, Ōtsuka Hōchū)
- Sieg (ジーク, Jīku): Shin-ichiro Miki (三木 眞一郎, Miki Shin'ichirō)
- Teddy (テディ, Tedi): Daisuke Ono (小野 大輔, Ono Daisuke)
- Ghost Imagin (ゴーストイマジン, Gōsuto Imajin): Hiroshi Kamiya (神谷 浩史, Kamiya Hiroshi)
- Phantom Imagin (ファントムイマジン, Fantomu Imajin): Takuma Takewaka (竹若 拓磨, Takewaka Takuma)
- Shadow Imagin (シャドウイマジン, Shadō Imajin): Tomokazu Sugita (杉田 智和, Sugita Tomokazu)

== Songs ==
Opening themes

- "Climax Jump the Final"
  - Lyrics: Shoko Fujibayashi
  - Composition & Arrangement: Shuhei Naruse
  - Guitar: AYANO (of FULL AHEAD)
  - Artist: AAA DEN-O form
  "Climax Jump the Final" is a new arrangement of "Climax Jump" recorded for Saraba Kamen Rider Den-O: Final Countdown. It was included on the mini-album Ī jan! Ī jan! Sugē jan!? (いーじゃん！いーじゃん！スゲーじゃん!?, It's Good! It's Great! Isn't it Awesome!?). This album also included "Climax Jump Sword form," "Climax Jump Rod form," "Climax Jump Ax form," "Climax Jump Gun form," and "Climax Jump Piano form."
