= Kenjirō Ishimaru =

Japanese actor and TV narrator (born 1953)

- 石丸 謙二郎
- Born: 1 November 1953 (age 72); Ōita Prefecture
- Occupations: Actor, narrator
- Years active: 1978-present
- Website: www.ishi-ken.jp

Kenjirō Ishimaru (石丸 謙二郎, Ishimaru Kenjirō; born 1 November 1953) is a Japanese actor and TV narrator. He is best known for his role in Kamen Rider series Kamen Rider Den-O as the owner of the DenLiner. He has also appeared in multiple competitions of Sasuke as a competitor and during that time has become one of only two people to fall off the Rolling Log obstacle in the First Stage and take the log with them. Ishimaru is the narrator in the anime series Toriko. He also narrates TV Asahi's series See the World by Train, which has run since June 1987.

== Selected filmography ==
=== Film ===
Year	Film	Role	Notes	Ref
1983	Theater of Life	Actor portraying Asano Naganori		
1989	Black Rain	Aono		
1997	Lost Paradise	Muramatsu		
1999	Ring 2	Ômuta		
2001	Onmyoji	Onmyo-gashira		
2001	Harmful Insect	Middle-aged man in convenience store		
2004	Kekko Kamen			
2004	Kekko Kamen Returns			
2004	Kekko Kamen: The MGF Strikes Back	Gozaemon Maru		
2004	Kekko Kamen Surprise			
2005	Spring Snow	Marquis Ayakura		
2005	Always Sanchōme no Yūhi	Shizuo Fujio		
2005	Hasami Otoko			
2007	Kamen Rider Den-O: I'm Born!	Owner		
2008	Kamen Rider Den-O & Kiva: Climax Deka	Owner		
2008	Saraba Kamen Rider Den-O: Final Countdown	Owner		
2009	20th Century Boys 2: The Last Hope	Police superintendent		
2009	Cho Kamen Rider Den-O & Decade Neo Generations: The Onigashima Warship	Owner, station master		
2010	Kamen Rider × Kamen Rider × Kamen Rider The Movie: Cho-Den-O Trilogy	Owner, station master		
2011	OOO, Den-O, All Riders: Let's Go Kamen Riders	Owner		
2017	Fullmetal Alchemist	Father Cornello		
2018	Kamen Rider Heisei Generations Forever	Owner		
2019	Iwane: Sword of Serenity	Sakazaki Masayoshi		
2020	The Dignified Death of Shizuo Yamanaka	Fujita		
2021	The Master Plan	Andō		
2022	The Life of Chiyoko Ito	Special Higher Police		
2023	Baian the Assassin, M.D.	Hikohachirō		

=== Television ===
Year	Film	Role	Notes	Ref
2021	Reach Beyond the Blue Sky	Hara Takashi	Taiga drama	
