= Kōji Yusa =

Japanese voice actor and narrator (born 1968)

- 遊佐 浩二
- Born: August 12, 1968 (age 58); Fushimi-ku, Kyoto, Japan
- Other name: Yucchii (ゆっちー)
- Occupations: Voice actor; narrator
- Years active: 1993–present
- Height: 173 cm (5 ft 8 in)
- Spouses: Kanako Mitsuhashi (m. 2007; div. 2012) Miyari Nemoto (m. 2026)

Kōji Yusa (遊佐 浩二, Yusa Kōji; born August 12, 1968) is a Japanese freelance voice actor and narrator, born and raised in Fushimi-ku, Kyoto. He is best known for his roles in Bleach as Gin Ichimaru, Choja Raideen as Raideen Owl, the Sonic the Hedgehog series as Shadow the Hedgehog, Battle Vixens as Zuo Ci and Xu Huang, Majin Tantei Nōgami Neuro as Eiji Sasazuka, Zettai Karen Children as Kyōsuke Hyōbu, Yowamushi Pedal as Akira Midousuji, Renzo Shima in Blue Exorcist, and Kamen Rider Den-O as Urataros.

== Biography ==
As a child, Yusa lived near the Kyoto Racecourse in Yodo, Fushimi-ku, Kyoto. As a gift for entering junior high school, he received a boombox and listened to radio dramas, which inspired him to become a voice actor. When he was in college, he majored in Japanese language studies. After graduating from college, he went through the 7th class of Katsuta Voice Actor Academy and made his debut as a voice actor in 1993 at the age of 25 in The Brave of Gold Goldran. At the time of his debut, he belonged to Office Kaoru; since leaving the company, he has been working freelance. He mainly works as a dubbing artist for anime, drama CDs, and foreign films, as well as a narrator for information programs. In addition to his main job as a voice actor, he has also worked in events and radio.

Yusa won the Synergy Award for Kamen Rider Den-O at the 2nd Seiyu Awards.

He married voice actress Kanako Mitsuhashi in 2007; in 2012, he announced on his radio program that they had divorced. In 2026, he married voice actress Miyari Nemoto.

== Filmography ==
=== Television animation ===
1992

- Crayon Shin-chan – Salary man, Shō's father, masseur, additional voices

1993

- Shima Shima Tora no Shimajirō – Caster

1995

- Bonobono – Nan Nan
- Slayers – Guard

1996

- After War Gundam X – Demar Griffe
- Brave Command Dagwon – Announcer, young pupil, delinquent
- Choja Raideen – Ginga Torikai/Raideen Owl
- Detective Conan – Ginji Tobita, Toshiya Tadokoro, Tetsuya Kawasaki, Hisashi Suguro, Ryōsuke Shiina, Damu official, fireman, judge #A, police station official, Nagasaku Shiro, Dogo Hoshikawa

1997

- Clamp School Detectives – Black-suited man #D
- The King of Braves GaoGaiGar – Steering committee
- Pokémon – Yūji, Mitsuji

1998

- DT Eightron – Beruku
- Lost Universe – Aku Gaki

1999

- Angel Links – Nikora
- Crest of the Stars – Larnia
- Dai-Guard – Makise
- Initial D Second Stage – Thunders, additional voices
- Turn A Gundam – Laborer #A, farmer #B, militia soldier #B

2000

- Banner of the Stars – Larnia
- Boogiepop Phantom – Takashi
- Fighting Spirit – Test student

2001

- Baki the Grappler – Gaia Nomura
- Earth Maiden Arjuna – Adjutant #C
- Hikaru no Go – Michio Shirakawa, Kyōhei Katagiri, liege lord, additional voices
- Rune Soldier – Hero, adventurer #B
- The SoulTaker – Operator
- Star Ocean: The Second Story – Keith

2002

- Atashin'chi – Math teacher, daughter's boyfriend, bus driver, salesman, instructor, additional voices
- Full Metal Panic!: The Second Raid – Tony
- Hungry Heart: Wild Striker – Haruki Ōmura, Minoru Fujimori, Koboku, additional voices
- Papuwa – Gionkamen Arashiyama, Kimura, Nagara River Cormorant

2003

- Transformers: Armada – Demolishor (Japanese: Ironhide), Thrust
- Astro Boy: Mighty Atom – Blues, staff member, pilot
- Kino's Journey – Salary man
- Sonic X – Shadow the Hedgehog
- The World of Narue – Shimada owner

2004

- AM Driver – Scene Pierce
- Battle B-Daman – Bodyguard
- Black Jack – Doctor
- Shura no Toki: Age of Chaos – Takato Mutsu, Asanosuke, Tōkichi
- Transformers: Energon – Ironhide/Irontread, Wing Dagger/Wing Saber
- Yakitate!! Japan – Edward Kaiser
- Yu-Gi-Oh! GX – Fubuki Tenjoin

2005

- Bleach – Gin Ichimaru
- Blood+ – Gudolf, Archer Research Aide
- Doraemon – Man
- Eyeshield 21 – Rui Habashira, Shigeru Miyake, Simon
- Ginga Legend Weed – Buruge

2006

- Chaotic – Codemaster Crellan
- Ergo Proxy – Vincent Law
- Gintama – Ayumu Tōjō
- Nana – Nishimoto
- Night Head Genesis – Kamiyashi
- Saiunkoku Monogatari – Doushu
- Shijō Saikyō no Deshi Kenichi – Ikeshita

2007

- Claymore – Isley
- Dennō Coil – Sōsuke
- Goshūshō-sama Ninomiya-kun – Tasuku Okushiro
- Ikki Tousen Dragon Destiny – Zuo Ci, Xu Huang
- Koutetsu Sangokushi – Zhuge Jin, messenger, Gorotsuki
- Les Misérables: Shōjo Cosette – Montparnasse
- Majin Tantei Nōgami Neuro – Eishi Sasazuka
- MapleStory – Aroaro
- The Story of Saiunkoku – Hanasana
- Tetsuko no Tabi – Group

2008

- Amatsuki – Kon Shinonome
- Dazzle – Jenfūpu
- Ikki Tousen Great Guardians – Zuo Ci
- Kuroshitsuji – Lau
- Persona -trinity soul- – Kiyofumi Nagai
- Special A – Aoi Ogata
- Zettai Karen Children – Kyōsuke Hyōbu
- Yes! PreCure 5 – Count Rozetto

2009

- Chrome Shelled Regios – Roy Entorio
- Eden of the East – Jintarō Tsuji
- Tegami Bachi Reverse – Lawrence
- Umineko no Naku Koro ni – Juza Amakusa

2010

- Hakuōki – Sanosuke Harada
- Hanamaru Kindergarten – Hanamaru Sensei
- Nurarihyon no Mago – Nurarihyon (young)
- Ookami Kakushi – Shunichirou Sakaki
- Seikon no Qwaser – Georg Tanner
- Starry Sky – Mizushima Iku

2011

- Blue Exorcist – Renzou Shima
- B-Daman Crossfire – Force=Dragren
- Gyakkyō Burai Kaiji: Hakairoku-hen – Tomohiro Miyoshi
- Kore wa Zombie Desu ka? – King of the Night
- Nurarihyon no Mago: Sennen Makyo – Nurarihyon (young)
- Tiger & Bunny – Yuri Petrov/Lunatic
- Uta no Prince-sama Maji Love 1000% (Season 1), Ryuuya Hyuuga

2012

- Smile PreCure! - Koichi Nozawa
- Arcana Famiglia – Jolly
- Fairy Tail the Movie: The Phoenix Priestess – Chase
- Kingdom – Bì
- Sword Art Online – Kuradeel
- Koi to Senkyo to Chocolate – Reiji Saga
- Zetman – Seiji Haitani

2013

- Blood Lad – Papladon Achim
- Kara no Kyoukai – Cornelius Alba
- Karneval – Tsukitachi
- Shingeki no Kyojin: Kuinaki Sentaku – Farlan Church
- Space Battleship Yamato 2199 – Kiyoshi Tooyama
- Tokyo Ravens – Ōtomo Jin
- Uta no Prince-sama Maji Love 2000% (Season 2), Ryuuya Hyuuga
- Yowamushi Pedal – Akira Midōsuji
- The Unlimited: Hyōbu Kyōsuke – Kyōsuke Hyōbu

2014

- Yo-kai Watch - Fumika's Father
- Donten ni Warau – Kotaro Fuma
- Gundam Build Fighters Try – Daiki Miyaga
- Hozuki's Coolheadedness – Hakutaku
- The Irregular at Magic High School – Zhou Gongjin
- Pupa – Shirō Onijima
- Terra Formars – Adolf Reinhardt
- Tokyo Ghoul – Tatara

2015

- Atashin'chi – Math teacher, daughter's boyfriend, bus driver, salesman, instructor, additional voices
- Gangsta. – Domenico Arcangelo
- GATE – Akira Yanagida
- Overlord – Brain Unglaus
- Q Transformers: Return of the Mystery of Convoy – Jazz
- Anti-Magic Academy: The 35th Test Platoon – Haunted
- Uta no Prince-sama Maji Love Revolutions (Season 3) – Ryuuya Hyuuga
- Working!!! – Tohru Minegishi
- Young Black Jack – Yabu

2016

- Divine Gate – Loki
- Drifters – Flamme
- Haven't You Heard? I'm Sakamoto – Shou Hayabusa/8823
- Izetta: The Last Witch – Görtz
- Maho Girls PreCure! – Batty
- Mob Psycho 100 – Shinji Kamuro
- Norn9 - Itsuki Kagami
- Puzzle & Dragons X – Jest
- Servamp – Johannes Mimir Faustus
- Uta no Prince-sama Maji Love Legend Star (Season 4) – Ryuuya Hyuuga

2017

- ACCA: 13-Territory Inspection Dept. – Lilium
- Fate/Apocrypha – Lancer of Red/Karna
- Vatican Miracle Examiner – Priest Julia
- Yowamushi Pedal: New Generation – Akira Midōsuji

2018

- Magical Girl Ore – Hyoue
- The Seven Deadly Sins: Revival of The Commandments – Grayroad
- Radiant – Dragunov

2019

- Dororo – Sabame
- The Morose Mononokean II – Gyousei
- Midnight Occult Civil Servants – Reiji Senda

2020

- Pet – Ron
- Kuma Kuma Kuma Bear – Cliff Foschurose
- Talentless Nana – Jin Tachibana

2021

- Ex-Arm – Shūichi Natsume
- High-Rise Invasion – Kazuma Aohara
- The Case Study of Vanitas – Johann
- Seirei Gensouki: Spirit Chronicles – Reiss Vulfe
- Battle Game in 5 Seconds – Masaya Kuroiwa
- Dragon Quest: The Adventure of Dai – Fenbren
- The Faraway Paladin – Tonio

2022

- Ranking of Kings – Ōken
- Trapped in a Dating Sim: The World of Otome Games Is Tough for Mobs – Chris Fia Arclight
- Bleach: Thousand-Year Blood War – Gin Ichimaru

2023

- The Most Heretical Last Boss Queen – Gilbert
- Undead Unluck – Nico

2024

- Pseudo Harem – Tsuguto Iwata
- Wistoria: Wand and Sword – Edward Serfence
- As a Reincarnated Aristocrat, I'll Use My Appraisal Skill to Rise in the World (season 2) – Chacma Drees
- Tying the Knot with an Amagami Sister – Miemon Kitashirakawa
- Yakuza Fiancé: Raise wa Tanin ga Ii – Shoma Toriashi

2025

- Flower and Asura – Hiromi Kichijōji
- Dr. Stone: Science Future – Stanley Snyder
- Sword of the Demon Hunter: Kijin Gentōshō – Somegorō Akitsu
- Go! Go! Loser Ranger! Season 2 – Hwalipon
- Reincarnated as a Neglected Noble: Raising My Baby Brother with Memories from My Past Life – Victor
- Secrets of the Silent Witch - Victor Thornlee

2026

- Hell's Paradise: Jigokuraku Season 2 – Jikka
- Hikuidori – Samon Orishimo
- Jujutsu Kaisen Season 3 – Naoya Zen'in
- Noble Reincarnation: Born Blessed, So I'll Obtain Ultimate Power – Albert Ararat
- Kusunoki's Garden of Gods – Ōryū
- Eren the Southpaw – Hajime Yanagi
- Fist of the North Star – Shin
- Red River – Urhi
- The Ghost in the Shell – Ghorantl Representative
- Magic Knight Rayearth - Ceres

=== Tokusatsu ===
- Kamen Rider Ryuki (2002) Hyper Battle Video – Evil Agito Burning Form
- Mahou Sentai Magiranger (2005) – Hades Beastman King of Hell Yeti Zee (ep. 27 - 30)
- Kamen Rider Kabuto (2006) Hyper Battle Video – Gatack Zecter
- Kamen Rider Den-O (2007) – Urataros/Kamen Rider Den-O Rod Form (eps. 5 - 49), Newt Imagin (ep. 40)
- Kamen Rider Den-O: I'm Born! (2007) – Ura taros/Kamen Rider Den-O Rod Form
- Kamen Rider Den-O & Kiva: Climax Deka (2008) – Urataros/Kamen Rider Den-O Rod Form
- Kamen Rider Kiva: King of the Castle in the Demon World (2008) – Shogi Player (cameo)
- Saraba Kamen Rider Den-O: Final Countdown (2008) – Urataros/Kamen Rider Den-O Rod Form
- Kamen Rider Decade (2009) – Urataros/Kamen Rider Den-O Rod Form
- Cho Kamen Rider Den-O & Decade Neo Generations: The Onigashima Warship (2009) – Urataros/Kamen Rider Den-O Rod Form
- Kamen Rider × Kamen Rider × Kamen Rider The Movie: Cho-Den-O Trilogy (2010) – Urataros/Kamen Rider Den-O Rod Form/Uratazao
- OOO, Den-O, All Riders: Let's Go Kamen Riders (2011) – Urataros
- Kamen Rider × Super Sentai: Super Hero Taisen (2012) – Urataros/Kamen Rider Den-O Rod Form, Kamen Rider Accel
- Kamen Rider × Super Sentai: Ultra Super Hero Taisen (2017) – Urataros/Kamen Rider Den-O Rod Form
- Kamen Rider Heisei Generations Forever (2018) – Urataros/Kamen Rider Den-O Rod Form
- Kamen Rider Zi-O (2019) – Urataros (ep. 39 - 40)
- Bakuage Sentai Boonboomger (2024) - Waruido Spindo

=== Original video animation (OVA) ===
- Hunter × Hunter: Greed Island (2003) – Wing, Jispa, Bara
- Hunter × Hunter G I Final (2004) – Bara, Jispa, Montreux, Zetsk Bellam
- Bleach: The Sealed Sword Frenzy (2005) – Gin Ichimaru
- Dogs: Bullets & Carnage (2009) – Ian
- Initial D Extra Stage Impact Blue (xxxx) – Nogami
- Kamen Rider Den-O Collection DVD "Imagin Anime" (xxxx) – Urataros
- Saint Seiya: The Lost Canvas (xxxx) – Scorpio Kardia
- The Prince of Tennis: The National Tournament Semifinals (xxxx) – Osamu Watanabe
- Sex Pistols (xxxx) – Hoikushi
- Black Butler (2015) – Lau

=== Original net animation (ONA) ===
- Bastard!! (2023) – Zion Sol Vanderverg

=== Theatrical animation ===
- The Garden of Sinners: Paradox Spiral (2008) - Cornelius Alba
- Crayon Shin-chan: Serious Battle! Robot Dad Strikes Back (2014) – Jintaro Kuroiwa
- Farewell, My Dear Cramer: First Touch (2021) – Kōzō Samejima
- Mobile Suit Gundam: Cucuruz Doan's Island (2022) – Yun Sanho
- Sand Land (2023) – Pike
- That Time I Got Reincarnated as a Slime: Tears of the Azure Sea (2026) – Djeese

=== Video games ===
- Mermaid Prism (2006)
- Super Smash Bros. Brawl (2008) – Shadow the Hedgehog
- Super Smash Bros. for Nintendo 3DS and Wii U (2014) - Shadow the Hedgehog
- Nier Replicant (2010) – Nier
- Fate/Extra CCC (2013) – Karna
- Fate/Grand Order (2015) – Sakata Kintoki, Karna
- Fate/Extella (2016) – Karna
- JoJo's Bizarre Adventure: All Star Battle (PlayStation 3) (2013) – Noriaki Kakyoin
- Genshin Impact (2020) – Baizhu
- Punishing: Gray Raven (2022) - Roland

Unknown date

- Ar tonelico II – Croix Bartel
- Bleach: Kurenai ni Somaru Soul Society – Gin Ichimaru
- Bleach: Erabareshi Tarashii – Gin Ichimaru
- Bleach GC: Tasogare ni Mamieru Shinigami – Gin Ichimaru
- Bleach: The Blade of Fate – Gin Ichimaru
- Bleach: Kokui Hirameki Requiem – Gin Ichimaru
- Bleach: Hanaterashi Yabou – Gin Ichimaru
- Bleach: Blade Battlers – Gin Ichimaru
- Bleach: Blade Battlers 2nd – Gin Ichimaru
- Bleach: Shattered Blade – Gin Ichimaru
- Bleach: Heat the Soul 2 – Gin Ichimaru
- Bleach: Heat the Soul 3 – Gin Ichimaru
- Bleach: Heat the Soul 4 – Gin Ichimaru
- Bleach: Soul Resurrección – Gin Ichimaru
- Dear Girl ~Stories~ Hibiki – Teran Ikkemen
- Hakuoki Shinsengumi Kitan – Harada Sanosuke
- Hakuoki Zuisouroku – Harada Sanosuke
- Hakuoki Shinsengumi Kitan (PSP) – Harada Sanosuke
- Hakuoki Shinsengumi Kitan (PS3) – Harada Sanosuke
- Hakuoki Yugiroku – Harada Sanosuke
- Kamen Rider: Climax Heroes series – Kamen Rider Den-O Rod Form, Kamen Rider Den-O Super Climax Form
- Kichiku Megane – Midou Takanori
- Lucky Dog 1 – Bernardo Ortolani
- NORN9 – Kagami Itsuki
- Rogue Galaxy – Gale Dorban, Young Dorgengoa
- Sonic the Hedgehog series – Shadow the Hedgehog
- Super Smash Bros. Ultimate - Shadow the Hedgehog
- Starry☆Sky – Iku Mizushima
- Tales of Hearts – Chlorseraph
- Tales of Xillia 2 – Redau
- Yu-Gi-Oh! GX: Tag Force – Fubuki Tenjoin, Darkness (Fubuki)
- Yu-Gi-Oh! GX Tag Force 2 – Fubuki Tenjoin
- Yu-Gi-Oh! GX: Tag Force 3 – Fubuki Tenjoin

=== Drama CDs ===
- Abunai Series 3: Abunai Bara to Yuri no Sono – Michiru Kagetsuin
- Abunai Series 5: Abunai Shiawase Chou Bangaihen – Michiru Kagetsuin, Ran Saionji
- Ai de Kitsuku Shibaritai ~Koi Yori Hageshiku~ – Kazuma Fujimoto
- Aiso Tsukashi – Takatsudo
- Aitsu to Scandal series 2: Houkago wa Scandal – Hisashi Douzenji
- Ai wa Bara Iro no Kiss – Hikaru
- Akazukin to Mayoi no Mori – Yamaneko-san
- Attack on Titan – Farlan Church
- Bara no Hanabira – Hosaka
- Beauty & Ghost – Satou Seiji
- Benriya-san – Tarou Yamada
- Bishou no Neya ni Haberu Yoru
- Broadcast wo Toppatsure! – Mizuki Kitaoka
- Brother – Hiragi Mitsuo
- Bukiyou na Silent – Yuuji Sagara
- Egoist no Junai – Daisuke Matsubae
- Endless series 3: Endless Love – Kanzaki
- Faster than a Kiss – Kazuma Ojiro
- Gerard & Jacques – Jacques
- GetBackers – Suiha Koyanagi
- Goshujinsama to Inu – Taira
- Gouka Kyakusen de Koi wa Hajimaru series 7 – Albert
- Hanayome wa Yoru ni Chiru – Takaki Ei
- Hatoful Boyfriend – Yuuya Sakazaki
- Hisoyaka na Jounetsu series – Yamaoka
- Hoigakusha to Keiji no Aisho Series 1: Hoigakusha to Keiji no Aisho – Atsushi Fuyuki
- Hoigakusha to Keiji no Aisho Series 2: Hoigakusha to Keiji no Honne – Atsushi Fuyuki
- Honey Boys Spiral – Akiya Ousono
- Innai Kansen – Iori Sawamura
- Kakehiki wa Bed No Ue De – Uesugi
- Karneval – Tsukitaichi
- Kawaii Geboku no Sodatekata
- Kichiku Megane - Megane Hisouchaku Ban I, II – Midou Takanori
- Kichiku Megane - Megane Souchaku Ban I, II – Midou Takanori
- Kimi ga Inakerya Iki mo Dekinai – Nanao Kanae
- Kimi ga Koi ni Ochiru – Reiichirou
- Kimi ga Koi ni Oboreru – Reiichirou
- Kimi ga Suki Nanosa – Sasaki
- Kiraini Naranai dene – Touichirou Kashiwagi
- Kiss x Kiss – Kitamura Kou
- Kono Ai ni Hizamazuke – Fuyuki Suwa
- Kono Ai wo Kurae – Yuusuke Tsuda
- Konoyo Ibun Series 1: Konoyo Ibun – Tetsushi Hatoki
- Konoyo Ibun Series 2: Sono no San – Tetsushi Hatoki
- Kyūso wa Chiizu no Yume o Miru – Imagase Wataru
- Mujihi Na Otoko – Shirahane Nanao
- Mujihi Na Anata – Shirahane Nanao
- Naguru Hakui no Tenshi – Harutsugu Masamune
- Nijuurasen series 2: Aijou Sabaku – Kazushi Ousaka
- Otokonoko niwa Himitsu ga Aru Series 2 & 3 – Nakatsugawa
- Pearl series 2: Yokubari na Pearl – Touya
- Pearl series 3: Wagamama na Pearl – Touya
- Pearl series 4: Kimagure na Pearl – Touya
- Punch Up! – Shinobu Hishiya
- Recipe – Satoshi Kunohara
- Ryū no Hanawazurai – Kuwan
- Saihate no Kimi e – Saiga
- Saint Seiya Episode.G – Galan
- Saudade – Yukinari Shizuka
- Senzoku de Aishite – Tomoki Aida
- Sex Pistols #2 – Narrator
- Shiawase ni Shite Agemasu – Mayumi Nikaidou
- Shosen Kedamono Series 2: Youko Nitsumaru – Rikka
- Shosen Kedamono Series side story 2: Souko Gekka ni Hohoemu – Younger Souko/Green Hair
- Sojou no Koi wa Nido Haneru – Wataru Imagase
- Sono Kuchibiru ni Yoru no Tsuyu – Tatsuki Wada
- Sora ni Hibiku Ryuu no Utagoe – Ryusei
- Soshite Koi ga Hajimaru – Iida
- Starry☆Sky – Iku Mizushima
- Subete wa Kono Yoru ni – Ryouichi Suzuhara
- Tendre Voyou 6/ Mujihi Na Otoko – Nanao Shirahane
- Tenshi no Naku Yoru – Tamiya Tomonori
- Tora Nii-san To Wanko-san – Tora-san
- Tora-san To Ookami-san – Tora-san
- Tsuki ni Ookami – Suou
- Tsumi series – Masami Tomioka
- Wabi to Erosu no Okeiko
- Wasurenaide Itekure – Seiryou Moriya
- Yandere Heaven – Hajime
- Yuki yo Ringo no Ka no Gotoku – Katsura Eiji
- Yume Musubi, Koi Musubi – Shuuji Chizusu
- Yuuwaku - Temptation – Ryoichi Sakisaka
- A Terrified Teacher at Ghoul School — Miki Rintarou

=== Dubbing roles ===
==== Live-action ====
- Cillian Murphy
  - Batman Begins – Doctor Jonathan Crane
  - Red Eye – Jackson "Jack" Rippner
  - The Dark Knight – Doctor Jonathan Crane
  - The Dark Knight Rises – Doctor Jonathan Crane
- As Good as It Gets – Vincent Lopiano (Skeet Ulrich)
- Atomic Twister – Potter (Johnny Blick)
- The Beach – Étienne (Guillaume Canet)
- Boy Meets World – Ronny
- Burning – Ben (Steven Yeun)
- The Dark Knight – Coleman Reese (Joshua Harto)
- Dr. Dolittle 2 – Pepito (Jacob Vargas)
- Fight Club – The Mechanic (Holt McCallany)
- Gotham – Harvey Dent (Nicholas D'Agosto)
- Idle Hands – Randy (Jack Noseworthy)
- Jason X – Waylander (Derwin Jordan)
- Joey – Michael Tribbiani (Paulo Costanzo)
- Kamen Rider: Dragon Knight – Drew Lansing/Kamen Rider Torque
- The Lovers – Robert (Aidan Gillen)
- The Outer Limits – Agent Pinter (Robert Moloney)
- Primal Fear – Roy/Aaron Stampler (Edward Norton)
- Ninja Turtles: The Next Mutation – Leonardo
- Power Rangers Turbo – Elgar, Phantom Ranger
- Power Rangers in Space – Elgar, Phantom Ranger, Psycho Blue
- Power Rangers: Lost Galaxy – Chameliac, Psycho Blue
- Power Rangers: Samurai – Jayden Shiba/Red Samurai Ranger (Alex Heartman)
- Showtime – Charlie Hertz (John Cariani)
- X2: X-Men United (2006 TV Asahi edition) – Iceman (Shawn Ashmore)

==== Animation ====
- Babar (TV series) – Cornelius
- The Emoji Movie – Nerd Emoji
- The Powerpuff Girls – Professor Dick Hardley, Major Glory
- Transformers Animated – Prowl
- SpongeBob SquarePants - Squidward Tentacles
