= Tamaki Matsumoto =

Japanese voice actress

- 松元 環季
- Born: February 7, 1999 (age 27); Yokohama, Kanagawa Prefecture, Japan
- Occupations: Actress; voice actress; singer
- Years active: 2002–2011
- Height: 162 cm (5 ft 4 in)

Tamaki Matsumoto (松元 環季, Matsumoto Tamaki; born February 7, 1999) is a Japanese actress, voice actress and singer from Yokohama, Kanagawa.

== Career ==
In August 2001, Tamaki Matsumoto entered the Theater Academy. She debuted in October 2002, with the stage performance Teruteru no Teruko. In 2007, she received attention for her regular appearances in the TV dramas My Fairboy and Kamen Rider Den-O. She transferred from the Theater Academy (Cosmos Theater Company) to AT Production, an affiliated production company, in 2010.

She retired in April 2011 to dedicate more time to her academic life, especially to prepare for her secondary school entrance examination. In April 2017, she enrolled at Meiji Gakuin University in the Faculty of International Studies. On July 10 of the same year, she entered the Miss Meiji Gakuin Contest 2017. She was the DHC Award winner.

On September 14, 2017, Matsumoto made a surprise appearance on the talk show Farewell Kamen Rider Den-O Final Countdown Director's Cut Edition held in Tokyo.

== Filmography ==
=== Anime ===
- Code Geass: Lelouch of the Rebellion R2 as Tianzi
- Les Misérables - Shoujo Cosette as Cosette (3 years old)

=== Tokusatsu ===
- Kamen Rider Den-O as Kohana (33–49)
- Kamen Rider Decade as Kohana (14–15)
- Ultraman Mebius as Eiko

=== Film ===
- Doraemon: Nobita's New Great Adventure into the Underworld as Miyoko Mangetsu (Child)
- Doraemon: Nobita and the Green Giant Legend as Girl watering cans
- Kamen Rider Den-O Series as Kohana
  - Kamen Rider Den-O & Kiva: Climax Deka
  - Farewell, Kamen Rider Den-O: Final Countdown
  - Cho Kamen Rider Den-O & Decade Neo Generations: The Onigashima Warship
  - Kamen Rider × Kamen Rider × Kamen Rider The Movie: Cho-Den-O Trilogy
- 20th Century Boys – Live Movie as Yukiji (young)
- Keroro Gunso the Super Movie: Creation! Ultimate Keroro, Wonder Space-Time Island

=== Stage ===
- Sailor Moon musicals as Ami Mizuno (young)

=== Dubbing roles ===
- Up as Young Ellie (Elizabeth "Elie" Docter)

== Discography ==
=== Singles ===
- (2010/06/02) Kuttsuke Hattsuke Wonderland, Keroro Gunso's 17th ending.

Tenshi Teki Kenpou Yonjou, source unknown.
