= Cho-Den-O series =

Kamen Rider Den-O's Super Climax Form premiered in the first of the "Cho-Den-O" movies.

The "Cho-Den-O" series (「超・電王」シリーズ, "Chō-Den'ō" Shirīzu; "Super Den-O" series) is a Japanese multimedia franchise featuring the cast and characters of the popular Kamen Rider Series Kamen Rider Den-O and its films.

== History ==
Kamen Rider Den-O was the seventeenth installment of the Kamen Rider series and the eighth during the Heisei period run of the series, a joint production between Toei Company, TV Asahi, and the late Shotaro Ishinomori's production company Ishimori Productions. Its first film, Kamen Rider Den-O: I'm Born! opened in Japanese theaters on August 4, 2007. In its opening weekend, the movie came in 4th place and was the highest selling Japanese production of the week.

Later in 2007, Toei had announced that they were in production for a V-Cinema release for Den-O coupled with Kamen Rider Kiva, but this was later changed to be a direct, albeit limited, theatrical release entitled Kamen Rider Den-O & Kiva: Climax Deka. In its opening weekend, April 12, 2008, Climax Deka took the top spot at the Japanese box offices, unseating the Japanese release of Cloverfield. In the end, it grossed 730 million yen, over double the normal revenue for a Kamen Rider film.

Later in 2008, another press release from Toei announced that there was to be a third film for Den-O entitled, Saraba Kamen Rider Den-O: Final Countdown. Having a third film was the first for any of the Heisei Kamen Rider television series, a fact that Takeru Satoh, who had played the lead role of Ryotaro Nogami in the television series, attributes to Den-O's comedic timing. Eventually this was originally considered to be the last appearance of Den O. However because of its rising popularity, Toei Company announced on January 29, 2009, that there would be a fourth film for Den-O, and that it was in production as of January 29, 2009. The film was scheduled to be released in April 2009. On February 9, 2009, Toei revealed that this film was to be the first in the Cho-Den-O series. and that the film would feature the cast and characters of I'm Born!, Final Countdown, Kiva, and Kamen Rider Decade.

== The Onigashima Warship ==
The first film in the Cho-Den-O series is titled Cho Kamen Rider Den-O & Decade Neo Generations the Movie: The Onigashima Warship (劇場版 超・仮面ライダー電王&ディケイド NEOジェネレーションズ 鬼ヶ島の戦艦, Gekijōban Chō Kamen Raidā Den'ō Ando Dikeido Neo Jenerēshonzu Onigashima no Senkan) released on May 1, 2009. The film features the return of the Tarōs, Deneb, and Sieg, along with New Den-O from Final Countdown, Jiro, Ramon, and Riki of Kiva, and Tsukasa and Natsumi of Decade. The film also introduces Akina Minami portraying a bushi woman named Toki (トキ). The movie also marks the debut of Kamen Rider Cho-Den-O (仮面ライダー超電王, Kamen Raidā Chō Den'ō), also called Super Climax Form (超クライマックスフォーム, Chō Kuraimakkusu Fōmu), which appears as a variation of Den-O's Climax Form incorporating Wing Form's mask as wings.

== Cho-Den-O Trilogy ==
Kamen Rider × Kamen Rider × Kamen Rider The Movie: Cho-Den-O Trilogy (仮面ライダー×仮面ライダー×仮面ライダー THE MOVIE 超・電王トリロジー, Kamen Raidā × Kamen Raidā × Kamen Raidā Za Mūbī Chō Den'ō Torirojī) is the name given to a series of three films released in a four-week period between May 22 and June 19, 2010. The films, Episode Red, Blue, and Yellow, each focus on a different Kamen Rider in the extended Cho-Den-O storyline: Zeronos, New Den-O, and Diend of Decade. The trilogy was originally posted as a rumor on Futaba Channel as a single film titled Shu Kamen Rider Den-O The Movie Last Stop: The Climax is Eternal (劇場版 終仮面ライダー電王 終着点 クライマックスよ永遠に, Gekijōban Shū Kamen Raidā Den'ō Shūchakuten Kuraimakkusu yo Eien ni), however the April issue of Televi-kun confirmed the Cho-Den-O Trilogy title.
