= Takuma Takewaka =

Japanese actor and voice actor

Takuma Takewaka (竹若 拓磨, Takewaka Takuma; born March 22, 1971) is a Japanese actor and voice actor from Fukuoka Prefecture, Japan. He has been put into rehab after recovering from cerebral hemorrhage.

== Filmography ==
=== Anime ===
- Masaomi Ogami in Onmyou Taisenki
- Amon in Witch Hunter Robin
- Ogawara Ryouhei in Jinki:EXTEND
- Kirihito in GetBackers
- Okita Souji in Intrigue in the Bakumatsu – Irohanihoheto
- Raina Cromwell in Dragonaut -The Resonance-
- Morita Kaoru in Honey and Clover
- Observer in Kekkaishi
- Kenji in Swallowtail Inn
- Izumi Higa in Sekirei

=== Dubs ===
==== Live-action ====
- Alpha Dog, Frankie "Nuts" Ballenbacher (Justin Timberlake)
- Antwone Fisher, Antwone Fisher (Derek Luke)
- The Assassination of Jesse James by the Coward Robert Ford, Charley Ford (Sam Rockwell)
- Before the Devil Knows You're Dead, Hank Hanson (Ethan Hawke)
- Bionic Woman, Will Anthros (Chris Bowers)
- Black Hawk Down, Matt Eversmann (Josh Hartnett)
- Boogeyman, Tim (Barry Watson)
- Cabin Fever, Paul (Rider Strong)
- The Comebacks, Lance Truman (Matthew Lawrence)
- The Darjeeling Limited, Jack (Jason Schwartzman)
- The Departed, Colin Sullivan (Matt Damon)
- Eight Below, Charlie Cooper (Jason Biggs)
- Flags of Our Fathers, John Bradley (Ryan Phillippe)
- The Fog, Nicholas Castle (Tom Welling)
- Gossip Girl, Carter Baizen (Sebastian Stan)
- He's Just Not That Into You, Ben (Bradley Cooper)
- The Hole, Michael Steel (Desmond Harrington)
- Just Married, Tom Leezak (Ashton Kutcher)
- Ocean's trilogy, Linus Caldwell (Matt Damon)
- On the Edge, Jonathan Breech (Cillian Murphy)
- Pineapple Express, Saul Silver (James Franco)
- The Princess Diaries 2: Royal Engagement, Nicholas Deveraux (Chris Pine)
- REC, Pablo (Pablo Rosso)
- Rocky Balboa, Robert Balboa, Jr. (Milo Ventimiglia)
- Shutter, Benjamin Shaw (Joshua Jackson)
- Snakes on a Plane, Sean Jones (Nathan Phillips)
- Sunshine, James Mace (Chris Evans)
- Torchwood, Captain Jack Harkness (John Barrowman)

==== Animation ====
- Atlantis: Milo's Return, Milo

=== Drama CDs ===
- Aka no Shinmon (Hibiki Renjou)
