= Kamen Rider Den-O & Kiva: Climax Deka =

- Promotional poster

Japanese name
- Kanji: 劇場版 仮面ライダー電王&キバ クライマックス刑事（デカ）
Transcriptions
- Revised Hepburn: Gekijōban Kamen Raidā Den'ō Ando Kiba Kuraimakkusu Deka
- Directed by: Osamu Kaneda
- Written by: Yasuko Kobayashi
- Produced by: Ishimori Productions; Toei
- Starring: Takeru Satoh; Yuichi Nakamura; Kōji Seto; Tamaki Matsumoto; Rina Akiyama; Kenjirō Ishimaru; Ryota Murai; Kouhei Takeda
- Cinematography: Koji Kurata
- Edited by: Naoki Osada
- Music by: Toshihiko Sahashi; Tsuneyoshi Saito
- Production company: Toei
- Distributed by: Toei Co. Ltd
- Release date: April 12, 2008
- Running time: 70 minutes
- Language: Japanese

Kamen Rider Den-O & Kiva the Movie: Climax Deka (劇場版 仮面ライダー電王&キバ クライマックス刑事（デカ), Gekijōban Kamen Raidā Den'ō Ando Kiba Kuraimakkusu Deka; Masked Rider Den-O & Kiva The Movie: Climax Detectives) is a Japanese superhero tokusatsu film in the Kamen Rider franchise. Climax Deka is the second film to feature the characters of the television drama Kamen Rider Den-O and the first to feature the characters of Kamen Rider Kiva. It opened in theaters on April 12, 2008 as part of the Kamen Rider Spring Festival (春の仮面ライダー祭, Haru no Kamen Raidā Matsuri). In its first weekend, it took the top spot at the Japanese box offices, unseating the Japanese release of Cloverfield. In the end, it grossed 730 million yen, over double the normal revenue for a Kamen Rider film. Though it is the first Heisei Rider teamup, the story focuses more on Den-O than Kiva.

== Plot ==
Set after the events of Kamen Rider Den-O, Ryotaro and the DenLiner gang have set up a detective agency called the DenLiner Police (デンライナー署, Denrainā Sho) who seek to keep the Imagin that survived the Junction Point in check after an Imagin stole a spare Den-O Pass from Owner while he was training. While pursuing the Pink Rabbit Imagin via car chase, they cross paths with the Horse Fangire as Den-O and the Tarōs battle them, killing the two monsters and not finding the Den-O Pass on either.

Soon after, the DenLiner Police are joined by detective Kazuya Suzuki, who tells them of an "Evil Organization" that is making itself known in the criminal underworld. After R-Ryotaro's "arrest spree", Ryotaro and Kazuya encounter Wataru Kurenai and Shizuka as they are suspiciously digging up items for a new violin varnish. After a small spat with U-Ryotaro and an unintentional possession of Wataru by Momotaros, Ryotaro, and Kazuya locate the base of the Evil Organization after Wataru tips them off. There, before being chased out, they find Yuto with the organization's leader, the Imagin Negataros, and a man that Kazuya recognizes as a wanted criminal Seiya Kuroki.

Acting on his own, Kazuya attempts to arrest Kuroki, only to be ambushed by the Clown Imagin. However, with a drunk Deneb and Naomi as a distraction, Yuto, who has been working incognito, attempts to free Kazuya. Before he can ambush Sarah with a metal bat, he is possessed by Urataros who manages to successfully woo her and wrest the gun away. Yuto kicks Urataros out as he fights her and the Clown Imagin as Kuroki arrives, with K-Ryotaro providing backup. Negataros takes his leave while activating the detonation device with everyone making it out. At the DenLiner, after Kazuya apologizes for almost getting everyone killed and explains his reasons to be avenging his father Kazuma, Yuto reveals Negataros's plans. Despite telling them that he's too strong, the DenLiner Police decide to attack at full strength together, with Wataru performing in a solo violin sonata.

The next day, Negataros begins to set his plan in motion with Kamen Riders Den-O and Zeronos, along with their Imagin partners, standing in his way while Suzuki arrests Kuroki after the DenLiner takes him and his posse away from the fight. However, Negataros states that the Den-O legend should die right then and there and uses the Den-O Pass to become Nega Den-O as the fight begins. As the Tarōs deal with the Fangires, Zeronos battles the Clown Imagin while Den-O dukes it out with Nega Den-O. Nega Den-O easily gains the upper hand against all four Den-O forms, but before he can finish him off, Kamen Rider Kiva arrives to turn the tables as Den-O Climax Form joins him in a Double Rider Kick. The impact forces Negataros out of his Rider form. Refusing to accept defeat, Nega Den-O escapes in the Nega DenLiner with DenLiner, ZeroLiner, and Castle Doran (who joined the fight later on) in pursuit. All three giants combine their powers and finally destroy the Nega DenLiner, defeating Negataros once and for all.

Soon after, Ryotaro takes Kazuya to 1986 to see Kazuma as he is interviewing Otoya on an investigation, giving the young detective closure. Though they succeeded in their mission to stop Negataros, Momotaros decides to keep the DenLiner Police going as he considers being a cop a cool thing. After they succeed in cornering a couple of crooks, Deneb attempts to ask for Yuto to join the DenLiner Police, failing to see the crooks they cornered escape with the DenLiner Police and Yuto chasing after them.

== Characters ==
- Ryotaro Nogami/Kamen Rider Den-O (野上 良太郎／仮面ライダー電王, Nogami Ryōtarō/Kamen Raidā Den'ō): A very unlucky young man who discovers the Rider Pass, discovers that he is an individual known as a Singularity Point, and the man destined to become Den-O to fight the Imagin and protect time and space.
- Hana (ハナ): Another Singularity Point like Ryotaro, Kohana (コハナ), as she came to be called as she regressed in age due to certain events in the TV series, helps in protecting time and space while keeping the Tarōs in line. Other than her heightened physical strength, Hana also uses a bazooka as her weapon of choice.
- Naomi (ナオミ): The waitress of the dining car of the DenLiner who is extremely hyper and does not get surprised easily, sticking to her belief of making only coffee despite her batch being poorly made to non-Imagin.
- Owner (オーナー, Ōnā): The strange man who owns the DenLiner and has a habit of speaking in riddles when it comes to the nature of time. He becomes Chief Inspector of the DenLiner police, forming to get the Rider Pass back from Negataros.
- Airi Nogami (野上 愛理, Nogami Airi): Ryotaro's elder sister, Hana's future mother and owner of the Milk Dipper.
- Yuto Sakurai/Kamen Rider Zeronos (桜井 侑斗／仮面ライダーゼロノス, Sakurai Yūto/Kamen Raidā Zeronosu): A past incarnation of Airi's fiance who disappeared from time and Hana's future father. He has fought alongside Ryotaro as his ally.
- Seigi Ozaki (尾崎 正義, Ozaki Seigi): Cassanova journalist who is always looking for a new good story to restore his magazine, sometimes revealing Imagin attacks to Ryotaro this way. A regular customer at Milk Dipper, he always tries to court Airi.
- Issē Miura (三浦 イッセー, Miura Issē): A self-styled super counselor, Miura is also a Milk Dipper regular who tries to court Airi. Miura is the only minor character to be somewhat aware of the Tarōs' possessions of Ryotaro, believing them to be "evil spirits".
- Wataru Kurenai/Kamen Rider Kiva (紅 渡／仮面ライダーキバ, Kurenai Wataru/Kamen Raidā Kiba): A shy young man who teams up with Kivat to fight the Fangire race and protect humanity from them.
- Kivat-bat the 3rd (キバットバットIII世, Kibattobatto Sansei): Called "Kivat" for short, he is a solid character with dry wit, tending to have a bitter attitude. He formed a partnership with Wataru to give him the power of Kiva.
- Shizuka Nomura (野村 静香, Nomura Shizuka): A 14-year-old girl who is able to get around the shyness of Wataru, being a motherly figure to him as he teaches her how to play the violin.
- Otoya Kurenai (紅 音也, Kurenai Otoya): Wataru's father, a ladies' man and a master violinist. His exploits of battle against the Fangire take place in 1986.

=== Imagin ===
The Imagin (イマジン, Imajin) are the main antagonist group in Kamen Rider Den-O. Only the good Imagin have survived the Junction Point while most of the evil Imagin are erased from history. The four Tarōs (タロウズ, Tarōzu) become members of the newly made DenLiner Police (デンライナーポリス, Denrainā Porisu), a law-enforcement group to prevent changes in the past by Imagin who also survived the Junction Point and form an army under Negataros.

- Momotaros (モモタロス, Momotarosu): The hot-headed Imagin that first possesses Ryotaro, aiding him physically or in Sword Form to fight other Imagin. Now that his contract is fulfilled, Momotaros co-leads his comrades against his lookalike Negataros. Momotaros is seen using a revolver on the movie poster, but single-handedly uses a shotgun while on the Machine DenBird in the movie. Briefly possesses Wataru Kurenai by accident while attempting to possess Ryotaro, thanks to Urataros
- Urataros (ウラタロス, Uratarosu): The smooth-talking Imagin that possesses Ryotaro, aiding him physically or in Rod Form to fight other Imagin. Urataros is seen using a pistol on the movie poster. Briefly possesses Yuto Sakurai to the latter's initial dissatisfaction.
- Kintaros (キンタロス, Kintaros): The physically strongest of the Imagin that are linked to Ryotaro, aiding him physically or in Ax Form to fight other Imagin. Kintaros is seen using a shotgun on the movie poster.
- Ryutaros (リュウタロス, Ryūtarosu): The most childish of the Tarōs Ryotaro became contracted to, aiding him physically or in Gun Form to fight other Imagin. Ryutaros is seen using a sniper rifle on the movie poster.
- Deneb (デネブ, Denebu): The sole Imagin contracted to Yuto, aiding him physically or in Vega Form to fight other Imagin.

=== Fangire ===
The Fangire Race (ファンガイア族, Fangaia Zoku) are the main antagonist group in Kamen Rider Kiva. Other than the Horse Fangire (ホースファンガイア, Hōsu Fangaia), the others appeared in only human form before being destroyed by Zeronos Vega Form.

=== Movie-exclusive characters ===
- Kazuya Suzuki (鈴木 一哉, Suzuki Kazuya): A faint-hearted rookie detective investigating the crimes committed by the Evil Organization. He seems perpetually confused by the details of Ryoutaro's possession by the Taros', and R-Ryotaro's, U-Ryotaro's and M-Wataru's antics do not help the situation.
- Kazuma Suzuki (鈴木 一馬, Suzuki Kazuma): A detective in 1986 who is Kazuya's father. He died on duty, just before Kazuya was born.
- Seiya Kuroki (黒木 誠也, Kuroki Seiya): A criminal on the wanted list who aid Negataros in return for world domination. In the end, he is arrested by Kazuya after a fist fight.
- Sarah (セーラ, Sēra): Kuroki's right hand and the Clown Imagin's contract holder, she is defeated by Kohana.
- Negataros/Kamen Rider Nega Den-O (ネガタロス／仮面ライダーネガ電王, Negatarosu/Kamen Raidā Nega Den'ō): The villain of the movie, founder of the Evil Organization that he terms as the "Negataros Corps". He and a select few Imagin are stray Imagin who evaded the fate of the other evil Imagin when Kai ceased to exist. He is ultimately destroyed by the combined powers of the DenLiner, ZeroLiner, and Castle Doran.
- Pink Rabbit Imagin (ピンクラビットイマジン, Pinku Rabitto Imajin): One of Negataros's Imagin followers. His form is based on the legend of The Tortoise and the Hare (ウサギとカメ, Usagi to Kame), as well as the Easter Bunny. His contractor is a robber who is working with the Horse Fangire. He is destroyed by Den-O Sword Form.
- Clown Imagin (クラウンイマジン, Kuraun Imajin): One of Negataros's Imagin followers. His form is based on the story The Sixteenth Evening (プルチネッラのお話, Puruchinerra no Ohanashi) from The Picture-Book without Pictures. His contractor is Sarah. He is destroyed by Den-O Sword Form.

== Short film ==
Alongside Climax Deka, the animated short Momotaros's Let's Go Kiva! (モモタロスのキバっていくぜ!, Momotarosu no Kibatte Ikuze!) was shown as a double feature and is a Momotion Picture (モモーションピクチャー, Momōshon Pikuchā), much like Momotaros's Summer Vacation in using live action photographs, 3D computer graphics, and traditional animation. In it, Kivat describes the history of motion pictures until Momotaros knocks him off and wonders what kind of movie they're going to be in, imagining a pirate movie. But the other Tarōs have different ideas of their own, from Urataros' Romance film to Kintaros's Wabi-sabi and then Ryutaros' animal movie. By the time Kivat throws in his own ideal movie, a biopic telling his life story from 22 years ago, the credits to the short start up and he bites Momotaros in frustration while the other Tarōs leave to see the movie.

== Cast ==
- Ryotaro Nogami (野上 良太郎, Nogami Ryōtarō): Takeru Satoh (佐藤 健, Satō Takeru)
- Yuto Sakurai (桜井 侑斗, Sakurai Yūto): Yuichi Nakamura (中村 優一, Nakamura Yūichi)
- Wataru Kurenai (紅 渡, Kurenai Wataru): Kōji Seto (瀬戸 康史, Seto Kōji)
- Kohana (コハナ): Tamaki Matsumoto (松元 環季, Matsumoto Tamaki)
- Naomi (ナオミ): Rina Akiyama (秋山 莉奈, Akiyama Rina)
- Owner (オーナー, Ōnā), Narration: Kenjirō Ishimaru (石丸 謙二郎, Ishimaru Kenjirō)
- Airi Nogami (野上 愛理, Nogami Airi): Wakana Matsumoto (松本 若菜, Matsumoto Wakana)
- Seigi Ozaki (尾崎 正義, Ozaki Seigi): Akira Nagata (永田 彬, Nagata Akira) of RUN&GUN
- Issē Miura (三浦 イッセー, Miura Issē): Ryo Ueno (上野 亮, Ueno Ryō)
- Kazuya Suzuki (鈴木 一哉, Suzuki Kazuya): Ryota Murai (村井 良大, Murai Ryōta)
- Otoya Kurenai (紅 音也, Kurenai Otoya): Kouhei Takeda (武田 航平, Takeda Kōhei)
- Shizuka Nomura (野村 静香, Nomura Shizuka): Rina Koike (小池 里奈, Koike Rina)
- Seiya Kuroki (黒木 誠也, Kuroki Seiya): Kenji Takechi (武智 健二, Takechi Kenji)
- Kazuma Suzuki (鈴木 一馬, Suzuki Kazuma): Ryoji Morimoto (森本 亮治, Morimoto Ryōji)
- Sarah (セーラ, Sēra): Sarah Branch (セーラ・ブランチ, Sēra Buranchi)
- Police Officers (警官, Keikan): Makoto Honda (本田 誠人, Honda Makoto), Tsuyoshi Muro (ムロ ツヨシ, Muro Tsuyoshi)
- Yakuza Boss (ヤクザの親分, Yakuza no Oyabun): Daigaku Sekine (関根 大学, Sekine Daigaku)
- Kuroki's Henchman (黒木の部下, Kuroki no Buka): Shinichi Kaneda (金田 進一, Kaneda Shin'ichi)
- Fangires' Human Form (ファンガイア人間体, Fangaia Ningentai): Jun Watanabe (渡辺 淳, Watanabe Jun), Fumiya Touei (藤榮 史哉, Tōei Fumiya), Kenichi Satō (佐藤 賢一, Satō Ken'ichi)

=== Voice actors ===
- Momotaros (モモタロス, Momotarosu): Toshihiko Seki (関 俊彦, Seki Toshihiko)
- Urataros (ウラタロス, Uratarosu): Kōji Yusa (遊佐 浩二, Yusa Kōji)
- Kintaros (キンタロス, Kintarosu): Masaki Terasoma (てらそま まさき, Terasoma Masaki)
- Ryutaros (リュウタロス, Ryūtarosu): Kenichi Suzumura (鈴村 健一, Suzumura Ken'ichi)
- Deneb (デネブ, Denebu): Hōchū Ōtsuka (大塚 芳忠, Ōtsuka Hōchū)
- Kivat-bat the 3rd (キバットバットIII世, Kibattobatto Sansei): Tomokazu Sugita (杉田 智和, Sugita Tomokazu)
- Negataros (ネガタロス, Negatarosu): Hikaru Midorikawa (緑川 光, Midorikawa Hikaru)
- Clown Imagin (クラウンイマジン, Kuraun Imajin): Chihiro Suzuki (鈴木 千尋, Suzuki Chihiro)
- Horse Fangire (ホースファンガイア, Hōsu Fangaia): Katsumi Shiono (塩野 勝美, Shiono Katsumi)

== Songs ==
Opening theme

- "Climax Jump DEN-LINER form"
  - Lyrics: Shoko Fujibayashi
  - Composition: Shuhei Naruse
  - Arrangement: LOVE+HATE
  - Artist: Momotaros, Urataros, Kintaros, Ryutaros (Toshihiko Seki, Kōji Yusa, Masaki Terasoma, Kenichi Suzumura)

Insert songs

- "Double-Action"
  - Lyrics: Shoko Fujibayashi
  - Composition & Arrangement: LOVE+HATE
  - Artist: Ryotaro Nogami & Momotaros (Takeru Satoh & Toshihiko Seki)
- "Double-Action Rod form"
  - Lyrics: Shoko Fujibayashi
  - Composition: LOVE+HATE
  - Arrangement: Yōichi Sakai
  - Artist: Ryotaro Nogami & Urataros (Takeru Satoh & Kōji Yusa)
- "Double-Action Ax form"
  - Lyrics: Shoko Fujibayashi
  - Composition: LOVE+HATE, Shuhei Naruse
  - Arrangement: Shuhei Naruse
  - Artist: Ryotaro Nogami & Kintaros (Takeru Satoh & Masaki Terasoma)
- "Double-Action Gun form"
  - Lyrics: Shoko Fujibayashi
  - Composition: LOVE+HATE, Shuhei Naruse
  - Arrangement: Shuhei Naruse
  - Artist: Ryotaro Nogami & Ryutaros (Takeru Satoh & Kenichi Suzumura)
- "Action-ZERO"
  - Lyrics: Shoko Fujibayashi
  - Composition & Arrangement: LOVE+HATE
  - Artist: Yuto Sakurai & Deneb (Yuichi Nakamura & Hōchū Ōtsuka)
- "Real-Action"
  - Lyrics: Shoko Fujibayashi
  - Composition & Arrangement: Ryo (of defspiral)
  - Artist: Ryotaro Nogami (Takeru Satoh)
- "Climax Jump HIPHOP ver."
  - Artist: AAA Den-O form

Ending theme

- "Double-Action CLIMAX form"
  - Lyrics: Shoko Fujibayashi
  - Composition: LOVE+HATE, Shuhei Naruse
  - Arrangement: Shuhei Naruse
  - Artist: Momotaros, Urataros, Kintaros, Ryutaros, Deneb (Toshihiko Seki, Kōji Yusa, Masaki Terasoma, Kenichi Suzumura, Hōchū Ōtsuka)
  "Double-Action CLIMAX form" is an arrangement of "Double-Action" that is the only quintet vocalist arrangement. Its single was released on April 16, 2008. Shuhei Naruse arranged and composed the song. Like "Climax Jump DEN-LINER form", the single has variant covers which designate its bonus track, one for each of the Imagin vocalists. These singles also include a DVD of the music video. A sixth single has all five Imagin on the cover, but does not have a bonus track nor a DVD. On its first day of release, the singles reached #3 on the Oricon Daily charts. It ended its first week on the Oricon at #4 on the Weekly Single Charts.
