= Rina Akiyama =

Japanese actress, gravure idol, and tarento (born 1985)

- 秋山 莉奈
- Born: September 26, 1985 (age 40); Tokyo, Japan
- Other names: Oshiriina; Rina Doll
- Occupations: Actress; gravure idol; tarento
- Years active: 2001–present
- Spouse: Shoshi Goto (m. 2015)
- Children: 3

Rina Akiyama (Japanese: 秋山 莉奈, Hepburn: Akiyama Rina; born September 26, 1985) is a Japanese actress, gravure idol, and tarento from Tokyo. Her most notable appearances are in two Kamen Rider series, namely Kamen Rider Agito and Kamen Rider Den-O. She also has a cameo appearance in Metal Gear Solid 3: Snake Eater in which she is featured in a poster on one of the levels. She has also been named to have the "Best Butt in Japan" in 2007, which earned her the nickname "Oshirina" (オシリーナ, Oshirīna), a portmanteau of the words "oshiri" (butt) and "Rina".

== Personal life ==
On June 30, 2015, she married boat racer Shoshi Goto. On February 19, 2016, she gave birth to a first boy. On March 26, 2020, she gave birth to a second boy. On August 31, 2022, she gave birth to her third child.

== Filmography ==
=== Film ===
Year	Title	Role	Notes	Ref.
2026	Agito: Psychic War	Mana Kazaya		

=== Television ===
Year	Title	Role	Notes	Ref.
2001	Kamen Rider Agito	Mana Kazaya		
