= Highland Park (film) =

- Film poster
- Directed by: Andrew Meieran
- Screenplay by: Christopher Keyser; Andrew Meieran
- Produced by: Craig Chapman; Anne Clements; Andrew Meieran; Chris Panizzon
- Starring: Danny Glover; Parker Posey; Billy Burke
- Cinematography: Daniel Moder
- Edited by: Dan Schalk
- Music by: Jane Antonia Cornish
- Production company: The Bureau of Moving Pictures
- Distributed by: Tribeca Film
- Release date: March 26, 2013
- Running time: 83 minutes
- Country: United States
- Language: English

Highland Park is a 2013 American dramedy film directed by Andrew Meieran and starring Danny Glover, Parker Posey and Billy Burke.

Based in Detroit, it is about a high school faculty lottery pool that hopes the lucky numbers they've played for ten years will finally pay off, after discovering budget cuts have eliminated their jobs.

== Plot ==
Set in the economically depressed Detroit suburb of Highland Park, Michigan, the city’s infrastructure is crumbling and the mayor is destructive rather than constructive. Six downtrodden friends connected through the local school (teachers, admin and maintenance) play the lottery with the same numbers every week for ten years, hoping to win big and change their lives. They also hope to use some of the prize money to stop their community’s backslide into poverty.

After so many years of playing the same numbers, Principal Lloyd Howard is disillusioned and decides he is out. He can’t bear to tell his teachers and support staff that they are all about to lose their jobs. He only tells Ed, the school’s retired maintenance worker who continues to work on the furnaces, whose task it is to buy the ticket.

Ed has an epiphany about the group’s luck, on his way to get the ticket before spending the next day’s fishing. A waitress, whose nametag says ‘Destiny’, hands him a plate of fortune cookies, enticing him to grab one.

Ex-homecoming queen Shirley Paine, the Mayor of Highland Park, arrives to Principal Howard’s office to personally give him the cuts in the high school. She keeps cutting the budget in Highland Park in areas that help the community (like healthcare, firefighters, the library, education, parks, sewer cleanup) in favor of vanity projects like malls and a stadium for her rich connections.

A desperate Jess, now unemployed bus driver, tries to knock over a convenience store with a toy gun, but the clerk recognises him, turning him away. Arriving at his estranged ex’s, she refuses to let him see his kids as he’s behind on his child support payments.

When it comes out that he has had to cut jobs and programs, Howard finds himself as the bearer of bad news and is viewed as a pariah in the community. Even the butcher chews him out, as his son is a senior on the football team.

But finally the school lotto pool’s numbers are called after so many years of playing them. Lloyd Howard and the other members of the betting pool suddenly find their lives turned around. They begin making big purchases and revitalizing the local economy.

Pushing for grant money, Howard uses resources based on the promise of the winnings. He gets into a game of one-upsmanship in with Mayor Shirley Paine, spending both private and public funds to revitalize Highland Park.

When Ed returns from his time in the woods fishing, days after the winning numbers were called, and reveals that he bought the ticket with different numbers, everyone but Howard turns against him. Howard has to go up against Paine without any resources and suffers her wrath when she turns the media on him.

Ed, after realizing it’s his fault for not buying the lotto ticket that everyone planned on, gives a speech about how everyone is the same as they were before they thought they won the money, so they are not out anything.

Lloyd Howard is painted early on as an idealist and a former troublemaker who has since made good as the beleaguered school principal. His body language changes, as if he has been carrying a great weight for a long time and then his whole posture changes as he becomes more assertive. He has a kind of spiritual rebirth.

The lottery group regroups, and thanks to the mayor’s now former assistant, they are able to hack Mayor Paine’s laptop, recovering incriminating e-mails. Howard pressures the mayor, through threatening to expose her corruption, into putting the money back into Highland Park.

Hope for the future is restored, both for the community that was originally meant to be a kind of beacon for the surrounding area, as well as for the six original lottery group members.

== Cast ==
- Billy Burke as Lloyd Howard
- Kimberly Elise as Toni
- John Carroll Lynch as Rory
- Parker Posey as Shirley Paine
- Danny Glover as Ed
- Rockmond Dunbar as Shaun
- Eric Ladin as Jessie
- Deborah Ann Woll as Lilly
- Haaz Sleiman as Ali Rasheed
- Bob Gunton as Bert
- Michelle Forbes as Sylvia Howard
- Bo Derek as Destiny
- Vernee Watson-Johnson as May
- Blake Clark as Hal
- Stephanie Koenig as Eileen

== Production ==
On 6 October 2009, Variety said cinematographer Daniel Moder and costume designer Deborah Everton were booked. On 8 October 2009, The Hollywood Reporter said Parker Posey had joined the cast, then shooting in Detroit. On 12 October 2009, Variety said Billy Burke had joined the cast, with Danny Glover, Michelle Forbes, Bob Gunton and Deborah Ann Woll.

== Release ==
In March 2013, ‘Highland Park’ was being distributed by Tribeca Film through Video On Demand.

== Reception ==
Leonard Maltin awarded the film two and half stars.
