= Kamen Rider Den-O: I'm Born! =

Kamen Rider Den-O the Movie: I'm Born!
- Film poster for both Kamen Rider Den-O: I'm Born! and Juken Sentai Gekiranger: Nei-Nei! Hou-Hou! Hong Kong Decisive Battle

Japanese name
- Kanji: 劇場版 仮面ライダー電王 俺、誕生！
Transcriptions
- Revised Hepburn: Gekijōban Kamen Raidā Den'ō Ore, Tanjō!
- Directed by: Takao Nagaishi
- Written by: Yasuko Kobayashi
- Based on: Kamen Rider Den-O by Yasuko Kobayashi
- Produced by: Ishimori Productions; Toei
- Starring: Takeru Satoh; Yuriko Shiratori; Yuichi Nakamura; Rina Akiyama; Kenjirō Ishimaru; Aki Hoshino; Tomonori Jinnai; Hiroyuki Watanabe
- Cinematography: Masao Inokuma
- Edited by: Naoki Osada
- Music by: Toshihiko Sahashi
- Production company: Toei
- Distributed by: Toei Co. Ltd
- Release date: August 4, 2007
- Running time: 69 minutes; 79 minutes (Final Cut)
- Country: Japan
- Language: Japanese

Kamen Rider Den-O the Movie: I'm Born! (劇場版 仮面ライダー電王 俺、誕生！, Gekijōban Kamen Raidā Den'ō Ore, Tanjō!; Masked Rider Den-O the Movie: I'm Born!) is the theatrical tokusatsu superhero film adaptation of the Kamen Rider Den-O TV series directed by Takao Nagaishi and written by Yasuko Kobayashi. The movie takes place between episodes 27 and 28 of the series, featuring the DenLiner and its passengers travel as far back as the Edo period of Japan.

The film is produced by Ishimori Productions and Toei, the producers of all the previous television series and films under the Kamen Rider franchise. Following the tradition of all Heisei Kamen Rider movies, it is a double bill with 2007's Super Sentai movie, Juken Sentai Gekiranger: Nei-Nei! Hou-Hou! Hong Kong Decisive Battle, both of which premiered on August 4, 2007. The film's title is translated into English as both Masked Rider Den-O The Movie: I'm Born! and I'll be born! on the initial collector's pack DVD release.

During its first week at the theaters, the movie came in 4th place and was the highest selling Japanese production of the week.

== Plot ==
Ryotaro pursues the Molech Imagin to May 8, 2000 and becomes Kamen Rider Den-O to destroy the Imagin. Though it seemed the danger passed, it turned out that the Molech Imagin was under the employ of a rogue Kamen Rider named Gaoh who hijacks the DenLiner with his band of Imagin. After knocking Ryotaro out when he and Hana attempted to board the DenLiner while trapping all the Taros sae Ryutaros, Gaoh steals Owner's Master Pass with the intent to travel back in time via "God's Line" to Japan's Edo Period to retrieve the legendary God's Train, the GaohLiner. Trapped in 2000, with Ryotaro having lost all memory of Den-O, he and Hana encounter Ryotaro's younger self, later called Kotaro by the group, and the Imagin Sieg that they aided earlier. Momotaros arrives after escaping the DenLiner, but he is only able to possess Kotaro while Sieg's special talents allow him to still possess Ryotaro. Yuto shows up, taking everyone on the ZeroLiner to pursue Gaoh, with Kotaro joining them. Gaoh uses the DenLiner to damage the ZeroLiner before transforming into his Kamen Rider Form to send the gang into the Mesozoic Era before they are able to reach the Edo Period. While Yuto fixes the ZeroLiner, Ryotaro and Kyotaro talk, revealing that the event Ryotaro most regrets is losing the only remaining photograph of his parents, who died when he was young, because he cannot remember their faces without the photograph.

The next day, getting the aid of Senhime, Ryotaro and company sneak into the camp of Yukimura Sanada, who is aiding Gaoh. Though the reunited Tarōs defeat Sanada's ninjas, with Sieg destroying the Cobra Imagin as Den-O Wing Form, Gaoh succeeds in obtaining the GaohLiner and travels forward to December 26, 1988, the day Ryotaro was born, to erase that day and thus eliminate Ryotaro. After regaining his memory and his ability to transform, Ryotaro is forced to fight Gaoh along with Momotaros and his band until Yuto arrives with the past Ryotaros he borrowed for the "Climax Scene". After the long battle, the Den-Os and Zeronos emerge victorious as Gaoh's followers are wiped out and the GaohLiner is destroyed by the DenLiner and ZeroLiner. Surviving the GaohLiner's destruction, Gaoh dies in a final duel with Den-O Sword Form, reduced to sand. On the return trip to his own time, the DenLiner comes across Ryotaro's old house, allowing Ryotaro and Kotaro to see the faces of their parents. Sieg and Kotaro also return to their respective timelines as well, resuming their places in history. When Ryotaro returns to the present, he finds a drawing of his parents in the picture frame where the original photo once was.

== Characters ==
=== Characters from the TV series ===
- Ryotaro Nogami/Kamen Rider Den-O (野上 良太郎／仮面ライダー電王, Nogami Ryōtarō/Kamen Raidā Den'ō): Once again gets access to Wing Form (ウイングフォーム, Uingu Fōmu). It was lost when Sieg had to be sent back in time to 1997, but he is retrieved to aid Ryotaro in the Tarōs' absence.
- Hana (ハナ)
- Naomi (ナオミ)
- Owner (オーナー, Ōnā): In the trailer, he reveals the existence of God's Line, a railway in time that allows travelers with a Master Pass to venture on it to go to any time period.
- Yuto Sakurai/Kamen Rider Zeronos (桜井 侑斗／仮面ライダーゼロノス, Sakurai Yūto/Kamen Raidā Zeronosu)

=== Movie-exclusive characters ===
- Gaoh/Kamen Rider Gaoh (牙王／仮面ライダー牙王（ガオウ）, Gaō/Kamen Raidā Gaō): He is a king of bandits from the Warring States era and leads a troop of Imagin with which he plans on using to take over the DenLiner. On his journey, he also obtains Yukimura's help in unearthing the GaohLiner. His main goal is to take over all of time and space.
- Senhime (千姫): A Japanese historical figure, the daughter of shogun Tokugawa Hidetada.
- Sanada Yukimura (真田 幸村): A Japanese historical figure, a samurai and son of the Sengoku period daimyō Sanada Masayuki. Yukimura an unwilling aid to Gaoh in unearthing the GaohLiner with the aid of his Ninja Corps.
- Sasuke (佐助): Yukimura's subordinate, sent after Ryotaro on Yukimura's orders from Gaoh.
- Saizō (才蔵): Yukimura's subordinate, he escorts Senhime to Toyotomi Hideyori's place.
- Kotaro/Kamen Rider Mini Den-O (小太郎／仮面ライダーミニ電王, Kotarō/Kamen Raidā Mini Den'ō): Ryotaro's younger self at age 11 that joins the DenLiner group in fighting Gaoh and his Imagin underlings. The Tarōs can also possess him due to their contracts with Ryotaro which extend into the past. Momotaros does so and allows Kotaro to become Mini Den-O Sword Form. Kotaro's transformation earns him the title of being the youngest Rider in history at age 11.
- Shinichi Nogami (野上 真一, Nogami Shin'ichi): The father of Airi and Ryotaro. 33 years old.
- Kayoko Nogami (野上 加世子, Nogami Kayoko): The mother of Airi and Ryotaro. 31 years old.

== Imagin ==
Since Ryotaro succumbed to temporary memory loss, the Tarōs obtained physical form temporarily. They do so to fight off the Ninja Corps and the Sanada Ten Braves.

=== Imagin from the TV series ===
- Momotaros (モモタロス, Momotarosu)
- Urataros (ウラタロス, Uratarosu)
- Kintaros (キンタロス, Kintarosu)
- Ryutaros (リュウタロス, Ryūtarosu)
- Deneb (デネブ, Denebu)
- Sieg (ジーク, Jīku): An Imagin who was on DenLiner for a while before he was taken to June 1, 1997. When Ryotaro and Hana were stranded in 2000, they meet up with Sieg who aids Ryotaro in the Tarōs' absence as repayment for preventing his disappearance. He once again provides Ryotaro with the ability to become Wing Form.

=== Gaoh's subordinates ===
- Molech Imagin (モレクイマジン, Moreku Imajin) who is based on the legend of "The Ancestors are All Eggs" (ご先祖様はみんな卵, Gosenzo-sama wa Min'na Tamago). He fights Den-O Sword Form and is defeated in episode 27, serving as a distraction for Gaoh.
- Cobra Imagin (コブライマジン, Kobura Imagin) who is based on the legend of "The Bear Fighting Hero" (クマたいじの勇者, Kuma Taiji no Yūsha). He fights Den-O Wing Form in the Edo period.
- Gecko Imagin (ゲッコーイマジン, Gekkō Imajin) who is based on the legend of "The Mystery of the Newt" (井守の怪, Imori no Kai). He fights Den-O Rod Form on December 26, 1988.
- Salamander Imagin (サラマンダーイマジン, Saramandā Imagin) who is based on an incarnation of the death god Xolotl (死神ショロトルの化身, shinigami Shorotoru no keshin) as the axolotl salamander. He fights Den-O Gun Form on December 26, 1988.
- Newt Imagin (ニュートイマジン, Nyūto Imajin) who is based on the legend of "The Mystery of the Newt". He fights Den-O Ax Form on December 26, 1988.

== Momotaros's Summer Vacation ==
Momotaros's Summer Vacation (モモタロスのなつやすみ, Momotarosu no Natsu Yasumi; abbreviated as Momo Natsu (モモなつ)) is a short film that debuted between the Gekiranger movie and I'm Born!. Using live action photographs, 3D computer graphics, and traditional animation (all of which is termed a Momotion Picture (モモーションピクチャー, Momōshon Pikuchā) by the production team), it has Momotaros gloating of his strength until Sha-Fu dared him to prove it by swimming. After being made fun of by Urataros and Ryutaros, and bashed by Kintaros, Momotaros is talked into believing he can swim by Deneb. But as the "mind over matter" influence wears off, the Imagin and Sha-Fu tell the audience the movie's coming up soon.

== Cast ==
- Ryotaro Nogami (野上 良太郎, Nogami Ryōtarō): Takeru Satoh (佐藤 健, Satō Takeru)
- Hana (ハナ): Yuriko Shiratori (白鳥 百合子, Shiratori Yuriko)
- Naomi (ナオミ): Rina Akiyama (秋山 莉奈, Akiyama Rina)
- Owner (オーナー, Ōnā): Kenjirō Ishimaru (石丸 謙二郎, Ishimaru Kenjirō)
- Airi Nogami (野上 愛理, Nogami Airi): Wakana Matsumoto (松本 若菜, Matsumoto Wakana)
- Seigi Ozaki (尾崎 正義, Ozaki Seigi): Akira Nagata (永田 彬, Nagata Akira) of Run&Gun
- Issē Miura (三浦 イッセー, Miura Issē): Ryo Ueno (上野 亮, Ueno Ryō)
- Yuto Sakurai (桜井 侑斗, Sakurai Yūto): Yuichi Nakamura (中村 優一, Nakamura Yūichi)
- Gaoh (牙王, Gaō): Hiroyuki Watanabe (渡辺 裕之, Watanabe Hiroyuki)
- Senhime (千姫): Aki Hoshino (星野 亜希, Hoshino Aki)
- Sanada Yukimura (真田 幸村): Tomonori Jinnai (陣内 智則, Jinnai Tomonori)
- Kotaro (小太郎, Kotarō): Takuya Mizoguchi (溝口 琢矢, Mizoguchi Takuya)
- Hiroshi Katō (加藤 浩, Katō Hiroshi): Minoru Matsumoto (松本 実, Matsumoto Minoru)
- Shinichi Nogami (野上 真一, Nogami Shin'ichi): Masashi Sasaki (佐々木 征史, Sasaki Masashi)
- Kayoko Nogami (野上 加世子, Nogami Kayoko): Ryoko Matsui (松井 涼子, Matsui Ryōko)
- Airi Nogami (in 1988) (野上 愛理（1988年）, Nogami Airi): Miyuri Kudō (工藤 美友里, Kudō Miyuri)
- Sasuke (佐助): Shingo Kawaguchi (川口 真五, Kawaguchi Shingo)
- Saizō (才蔵): Yoshiyuki Yamaguchi (山口 祥行, Yamaguchi Yoshiyuki)

=== Voice actors ===
- Momotaros (モモタロス, Momotarosu): Toshihiko Seki (関 俊彦, Seki Toshihiko)
- Urataros (ウラタロス, Uratarosu): Kōji Yusa (遊佐 浩二, Yusa Kōji)
- Kintaros (キンタロス, Kintarosu): Masaki Terasoma (てらそま まさき, Terasoma Masaki)
- Ryutaros (リュウタロス, Ryūtarosu): Kenichi Suzumura (鈴村 健一, Suzumura Ken'ichi)
- Deneb (デネブ, Denebu): Hōchū Ōtsuka (大塚 芳忠, Ōtsuka Hōchū)
- Sieg (ジーク, Jīku): Shin-ichiro Miki (三木 眞一郎, Miki Shin'ichirō)
- Molech Imagin (モレクイマジン, Moreku Imajin): Hidenori Tokuyama (徳山 秀典, Tokuyama Hidenori)
- Cobra Imagin (コブライマジン, Kobura Imajin): Takashi Hagino (萩野 崇, Hagino Takashi)
- Newt Imagin (ニュートイマジン, Nyūto Imajin): Yasuka Saitō (齋藤 ヤスカ, Saitō Yasuka)
- Salamander Imagin (サラマンダーイマジン, Saramandā Imajin): Masato Uchiyama (内山 眞人, Uchiyama Masato)

== Songs ==
Theme song

- "Yume de Aeta Nara…" (夢で逢えたなら…; If We Met in a Dream…)
  - Lyrics & Composition: Shogo.k
  - Arrangement: Seiji Kameda
  - Artist: 175R

Insert song

- "Climax Jump HIPHOP ver."
  - Lyrics: Shoko Fujibayashi
  - Composition & Arrangement: Shuhei Naruse
  - Singers: AAA Den-O form

Other songs

- "Double-Action GAOH form"
  - Lyrics: Shoko Fujibayashi
  - Composition: LOVE+HATE
  - Arrangement: Shuhei Naruse
  - Artist: Gaoh (Hiroyuki Watanabe)
  This song was not utilized in the theatrical release of the film but was placed on its soundtrack. It was also placed in the Final Cut Version DVD release.
- "Double-Action Wing form"
  - Lyrics: Shoko Fujibayashi
  - Composition: LOVE+HATE, Shuhei Naruse
  - Arrangement: Shuhei Naruse
  - Artist: Ryotaro Nogami & Sieg (Takeru Satoh & Shin-ichiro Miki)
  This song was not utilized in the theatrical release but was used in the Final Cut Version. It also plays during Sieg's appearance in the final episode of the TV series.

== DVD releases ==
The movie was initially released on DVD in Japan on January 28, 2008, in a normal edition and a Collectors' Pack (コレクターズパック, Corekutāzu Pakku) that came with a bonus disc. On May 21, 2008, the Final Cut (ファイナル・カット, Fainaru Katto) version was released which included 12 minutes of unreleased footage, the Momotaros's Summer Vacation short, and a special release CD with "Double-Action Wing form" and "Double-Action Wing form Sieg Dialog (ジーク セリフ, Jīku Serifu) Ver." on it.
