= Road to Paloma =

- Theatrical release poster
- Directed by: Jason Momoa
- Written by: Jason Momoa; Robert Homer Mollohan; Jonathan Hirschbein
- Produced by: Brian Andrew Mendoza; Jason Momoa
- Starring: Jason Momoa; Robert Homer Mollohan; Lisa Bonet; Michael Raymond-James; Chris Browning; Timothy V. Murphy; Sarah Shahi; Wes Studi
- Cinematography: Brian Andrew Mendoza
- Edited by: Brian Andrew Mendoza; Jennifer Tiexiera
- Music by: Ohad Benchetrit; Justin Small
- Production companies: Boss Media; Pride of Gypsies
- Distributed by: Anchor Bay Entertainment (UK and US); WWE Studios (US)
- Release dates: April 12, 2014 (Sarasota Film Festival); July 11, 2014 (United States)
- Running time: 91 minutes
- Country: United States
- Language: English
- Budget: $600,000
- Box office: $937,000

Road to Paloma is a 2014 American drama thriller film directed by (in his directorial debut), produced by, co-written by, and starring Jason Momoa. Robert Homer Mollohan co-stars and co-wrote the script. It also co-stars Sarah Shahi, Lisa Bonet, Michael Raymond-James, Chris Browning, Timothy V. Murphy, and Wes Studi. The film was released on July 11, 2014.

== Plot ==
After murdering his mother's rapist (the mother having died from her injuries) Wolf, a Native American, flees from the law. Six months later he meets up with a drifter called Cash and heads north to his sister's property where he intends to go spread his mother's ashes, but with the law right behind him his dream to lay his mother to peace may come at a price.

On their way up north to spread his mother’s ashes, Wolf and Cash are approached by a little boy covered in blood begging for help. They race into the desert brush to find a young woman being raped by a white male. Robert Wolf knocks the man out and goes to help the girl, who turns over and discovers that half her face has been brutally beaten. Wolf yells for Cash who runs through the brush eventually finding them and run to a nearby police station on foot, carrying the woman and child. A police officer sees them and gets help bringing them inside the station. When the officer turns around to ask for more information the pair attempt to runaway but stop when the officer draws his gun.

The officer calls for backup, however after they tell the officer what occurred he asks for their names, confirming that Wolf is the son of Chief Numay Wolf. The officer then lets them both go and tells them to hurry before backup can arrive and calls in the location of the rapist. Afterwards they ride away and head into the mountains to hide and make camp. Cash asks Wolf to be honest and wants to know why they were able to get away after being held at gun point by the officer.

Wolf tells Cash about his mothers brutal rape and that the man who committed the crime was unable to be tried by Tribal law and instead by the Federal courts who deemed the crime "not serious enough" and released the perpetrator. After discovering this he had tracked the man down and killed him six months ago and has been on the run ever since. Cash accepts the answer and asks Wolf where they're going next to help complete his journey.

The two make there way to a secluded spot where they connect with Wolfs sister Eva and brother-in-law Irish. Wolf also meets his godson whom they named "Wolf" after him. Wolf confesses to his sister that he wouldn't have done anything different about the murder and they lament over their mothers death. After spending some time catching up, Irish agrees to help them make their way into the mountains and drops them off, since it is too frigid to ride a motorcycle.

When Irish comes home he finds Eva distressed and Agent Williams and Agent Schaeffer waiting for him. They had discovered Wolf's bike, and Agent Williams threatens to tear Irish's family apart if they don't confess where the Wolf and Cash are headed.

Meanwhile, Wolf and Cash make there way high into the mountains, where Wolf starts the final ceremony to honor his mother. Back at Irish's home, both Agent Williams and Schaeffer begin to lead the handcuffed Irish into the mountains. Irish attempts to mislead the pair but Agent Schaeffer sees Wolf and Cash's tracks that point in another direction.

As they make their way over some boulders, Irish spots Wolf and yells for him to run. Agent William knocks him out and tells Schaeffer to shoot Wolf who has started running away.

Cash is further off resting when he hears the yelling and sees Wolf running away from the FBI agents. Agent Williams yells at Agent Schaeffer to shoot Wolf who rebuffs his request. Agent Schaeffer yells for Wolf to stop multiple times but ultimately chooses to shoot Wolf in the back to stop him from fleeing, incapacitating him. Wolf falls to his knees, knowing he will never be free again; he pulls a sharpened antler from his back pocket and stabs himself in the gut, ensuring he will bleed out and die.

Cash is finally able to make it to Wolf and holds him, telling him to hold on and yelling for help. However, Wolf passes away in Cash's arms, and is finally at peace. With the last scene being Wolf and Cash riding down the highway into the sunset.

== Cast ==
- Jason Momoa as Robert Wolf
- Sarah Shahi as Eva Murphy
- Lisa Bonet as Magdalena
- Michael Raymond-James as Timmy "Irish" Murphy
- Wes Studi as Chief Numay Wolf
- Jill Wagner as Sandy
- Lance Henriksen as FBI Agent Joe Kelly
- Timothy V. Murphy as FBI Agent Al Williams
- Chris Browning as FBI Agent Schaeffer
- James Harvey Ward as Billy
- Linden Chiles as Bob, The Mechanic
- Steve Reevis as Totonka
- Tanoai Reed as "Moose"
- Robert Homer Mollohan as Cash Guirgis
- Waylon Williams as Officer Sosi

== Production ==
In October 2011 Jason Momoa stated that he was writing, directing and acting in an upcoming project, Road to Paloma. Made for $600,000, filming began in February 2012 in Needles, California, where half of the filming was to be done. The rest took place in Los Angeles and Bishop.

Momoa set Shovels & Rope and The Rolling Stones to score the music for the film.

=== Filming ===
Filming was scheduled to begin in February 2012 in Needles, California, where half of the filming was to be done with the rest set to take place in Los Angeles and Bishop.

Additional scenes filmed near Mexican Hat, Monument Valley and Kayenta. End scenes possibly Henrys Fork of Green River near Kings Peak in the high Uintas.

=== Release ===
On August 13, 2013, it was announced that WWE Studios and Anchor Bay Entertainment had acquired distribution rights in North America, United Kingdom, Australia and New Zealand. A late 2013 release was planned. The film premiered at 2014 Sarasota Film Festival in April. The film gained positive reviews.

== Reception ==
Road to Paloma got "mixed or average" reviews from Metacritic, receiving 44 out of a 100, based on 8 reviews. On Rotten Tomatoes, the film holds a rating of 54%, based on 13 reviews, with an average rating of 5.5/10.

Frank Scheck of The Hollywood Reporter said that the film is "straining mightily for a mythic quality and reaching a predictably melancholic, violent conclusion, Road to Paloma mainly comes across as a vanity project star vehicle". Jeannette Catsoulis of The New York Times criticized "the film's loose naturalism", but praised its strong acting, specifically "Chris Browning, as a liaison between the F.B.I. and the reservation", saying that in her opinion, "[that was] especially enjoyable".

Gary Goldstein of the Los Angeles Times said that "though there's nothing terribly profound or unique about actor Jason Momoa's feature writing-directing debut, 'Road to Paloma', it does prove an effective throwback to the loose-limbed, my-way-or-the-highway road movies of the Easy Rider era".
