= 175R =

Japanese band

175R (１７５Ｒ, Inago Raidā; "Inago Rider") is a Japanese ska punk band from Kitakyūshū, Fukuoka Prefecture.

Debuting in 2001, 175R has released seven singles, seven albums and four DVDs. The band's members include Shogo on Vocals, Kazya on guitar, Isakick on bass and Yoshiaki on drums. The band shared their second single with the band Shaka Labbits. The name 175R means "Inago Rider," which is derived from the goroawase of "175" plus "R" for "rider." Inago (蝗) means grasshopper in Japanese, as a reference to the popular Kamen Rider Series of tokusatsu television programs. In 2007, the group's single "Yume de Aeta Nara..." was featured as the ending theme for the film Kamen Rider Den-O: I'm Born!.

Another one of their songs, Melody, was used featured in a music-related video game for the Nintendo DS called Osu! Tatakae! Ouendan. Unlike the other songs included in the game, Ouendan made use of an actual (albeit edited) 175R recording, instead of a cover version.

== Discography ==
Albums

- Go! Upstart! (February 6, 2002)
- Songs (June 18, 2003)
- Melody (September 1, 2004)
- 7 -Seven- (February 22, 2006)
- Bremen (April 25, 2007)
- Omae wa Sugee! (April 9, 2008)
- Japon (February 03, 2010)
- GET UP YOUTH! (April 5, 2017)

Singles

- "From North Nine States" (June 2001)
- "Stand By You!!" (July 2002, split single with Shaka Labbits)
- "Happy Life" (ハッピーライフ, Happii Raifu; January 16, 2003)
- "Sora ni Utaeba" (空に唄えば; If You Sing to the Sky, April 16, 2003)
- "Tegami" (手紙; Letter, November 12, 2003)
- "Glory Days" (March 3, 2004)
- "Yuyake Falsetto" (夕焼けファルセット; Evening Falsetto, July 21, 2004)
- "Orange" (November 17, 2004) (with Kick the Can Crew)
- "Graffiti" (グラフィティー, Gurafitī; March 22, 2005)
- "Melody" (メロディー, Merodī; September 7, 2005)
- "Shine, Hikari no Michishirube/Shiroi Christmas" (シャイン、光の道しるべ/白いクリスマス, November 30, 2005)
- "Boku wa Nanda -Ōen Shitakunatta no da!! Version-" (ボクハナンダ ～応援シタクナッタノダ!! Ver.～, February 8, 2006)
- "Hatenaki Ashita e to" (果てなき明日へと, November 1, 2006)
- "Kimi to Himawari" (君と向日葵, February 7, 2007)
- "Yume de Aeta Nara..." (夢で逢えたなら...; If We Had Met in a Dream, July 25, 2007)
- "Start Line" (スタートライン, Sutā Rain; August 29, 2007)

Home video

- Live! LiveE! Life? (December 2003)
- Clips+ (January 2004)
- Live! Live! Life? (December 2003) - Video, only 5000 prints.
- Live at Budokan '04 (December 2004)
