= In Full Bloom (film) =

2021 film

- Directed by: Adam VillaSenor; Reza Ghassemi
- Written by: Adam VillaSenor; Reza Ghassemi
- Produced by: Jacob Stein; Kyle Stroud; Adam VillaSenor; Reza Ghassemi
- Starring: Tyler Wood; Yusuke Ogasawara; Sean McCracken; Hiroyuki Watanabe; Timothy V. Murphy
- Cinematography: Adam VillaSenor; Reza Ghassemi
- Edited by: Adam VillaSenor; Reza Ghassemi
- Music by: Andrew Kawczynski
- Production companies: Bleiberg Entertainment, JA Pictures, Phantom House Pictures, Cinesia Pictures
- Distributed by: Dozo Films
- Release dates: September 15, 2019 (Oldenburg); October 15, 2021 (United States)
- Running time: 88 minutes
- Country: United States
- Languages: English; Japanese

In Full Bloom is a 2021 American neo-noir sports drama film written and directed by Adam VillaSeñor and Reza Ghassemi. It stars Tyler Wood, Yusuke Ogasawara, Sean McCracken, Timothy V. Murphy, Hiroyuki Watanabe.

The film had its world premiere at the Oldenburg International Film Festival on September 15, 2019, where it won the top prize, the German Independence Award, and it was released on December 15, 2020.

In Full Bloom won the Grand Jury Award (Feature) at the 2020 Mammoth Film Festival

== Plot ==
In post-WWII Tokyo, Japan's undefeated boxing champion, Masahiro trains in the winter wilderness for his upcoming battle against the American challenger, Clint Sullivan. Sullivan, who's haunted by memories of the war, must overcome the Yakuza's influence to preserve his honor. Pitted against political tensions, the fighters' parallel journeys will test the very limits of the human spirit.

== Cast ==
- Tyler Wood as Clint Sullivan
- Yusuke Ogasawara as Masahiro
- S. Scott McCracken as Silas
- Timothy V. Murphy as Roane
- Hiroyuki Watanabe as Tetsuro Tokugawa

== Release ==
On October 7, 2021, it was announced that Henry Cejudo would be the Executive Producer of In Full Bloom and would release in the US on October 15, 2021.

== Reception ==
On Rotten Tomatoes, the film holds an approval rating of 88% based on eight reviews, with an average of 6.8/10.

Stephen Dalton of Hollywood Reporter said that the film was "an impressively polished debut feature, admirably ambitious and elegantly crafted." Film Threat writer Hunter Lanier expressed that the film, "functions as a visually exciting tone poem and as a soulful reflection on battle." Boxer Mike Tyson boasted about the film saying, "they captured the art of fighting."

== See also ==
- List of boxing films
