= Plush (film) =

- Theatrical release poster
- Directed by: Catherine Hardwicke
- Written by: Arty Nelson; Catherine Hardwicke
- Produced by: Jason Blum; Catherine Hardwicke; Sherryl Clark
- Starring: Emily Browning; Cam Gigandet; Frances Fisher; Xavier Samuel; Brandon Jay McLaren; Dawn Olivieri
- Cinematography: Daniel Moder
- Edited by: Julia Wong
- Music by: Nick Launay; Ming Vauz
- Production companies: Blumhouse Productions; IM Global Octane
- Distributed by: Millennium Entertainment
- Release date: September 13, 2013
- Running time: 99 minutes
- Country: United States
- Language: English
- Budget: $2 million
- Box office: $28,864

Plush is a 2013 American erotic thriller film co-written, co-produced, and directed by Catherine Hardwicke and co-written by Arty Nelson with music by Nick Launay and Ming Vauz. The film stars Emily Browning, Xavier Samuel, Cam Gigandet, Dawn Olivieri, Thomas Dekker, and Frances Fisher.

== Plot ==
After losing her bandmate and brother to a drug overdose, rising rock star Hayley finds herself in a downward spiral. The second album from her band Plush is received as a critical and commercial disaster. She finds new hope and friendship in Enzo, the replacement guitarist who inspires her to reach new creative heights. However, soon their collaboration crosses the line sexually and Hayley, who is married with two children, retreats from Enzo's advances. As Hayley slowly discovers Enzo's dark and troubled history, she realizes she may have let a madman into her home and that her mistake may cost the lives of people closest to her.

== Cast ==
- Emily Browning as Hayley
- Xavier Samuel as Enzo
- Cam Gigandet as Carter
- Dawn Olivieri as Annie
- Thomas Dekker as Jack
- Frances Fisher as Camila
- Elizabeth Peña as Dr. Lopez
- Brandon Jay McLaren as Butch Hopkins / Writer
- Marlene Forte as Dr. Ortiz
- Bradley Metcalf, Jack Metcalf, and Travis Metcalf as The Twins
- Kennedy Waite as Lila
- Steven Asbury as Donnie / Drummer
- Marcus AK Andersson as Diego / Bass Player
- James Kyson as Coat & Tie Fan
- Indira G. Wilson as Limo Driver
- Caitlin Bray as Enzo's Sister

== Production ==
In 2012 Hardwicke announced her intentions to film Plush based on a script she wrote with Arty Nelson. IM Global was named as the financier for the film, which would star Emily Browning as the lead character. Principal photography began on August 27, 2012 in Los Angeles.

Teaser photos and posters were released on to the official website in August 2013.

== Novel ==
The tie-in Plush: A Novel by Kate Crash was released on July 27, 2013. Kate Crash also contributed several songs to Plush's soundtrack. The novel tells the story of the film and the nine years prior.

== Soundtrack ==
Plush: The Movie: Original Motion Picture Soundtrack, was a 2013 album. The score and soundtrack were produced by alternative post-punk producer Nick Launay and singer-songwriter Ming Vauz (Sleepmask). The soundtrack, initially conceived as a dramatic force for pushing the film's plot, featured music written and performed by Gary Numan (uncredited), Julian Shah-Tayler, Storm Large, Kate Crash, Anomie Belle, and Devix Szell. Leading actors Xavier Samuel, Emily Browning, and Thomas Dekker supplied vocal performances for their respective tracks.

== Reception ==
Critical reception for Plush has been predominantly negative. As of June 2020, the film holds a 33% approval rating on Rotten Tomatoes, based upon six reviews with an average rating of 4.12/10. Christy Lemire gave the film a half a star, criticizing it as "inauthentic at every turn". In contrast IndieWire gave the film a "B+", commenting that although Plush wasn't "high art", it did "commit fully and follow through with the courage of its convictions".
