= Daniel Moder =

American cinematographer (born 1969)

- Born: Daniel Richard Moder; January 31, 1969 (age 57); Los Angeles, California, U.S.
- Occupation: Cinematographer
- Years active: 1995–present
- Spouses: Vera Steimberg (m. 1997; div. 2002) Julia Roberts (m. 2002)
- Children: 3

Daniel Richard Moder (born January 31, 1969) is an American cinematographer who has worked on such films as Secret in Their Eyes, The Mexican, and Fireflies in the Garden. He received a Primetime Emmy Award nomination for his cinematography in the television film The Normal Heart. He is married to actress Julia Roberts.

== Career ==
Moder began his career as a production assistant in the 1995 action film Crimson Tide. The following year, he worked on the set of the 1996 sports drama film The Fan. From then, he worked in the Camera and Electrical Department on films like The Brave, Enemy of the State, The Big Tease, and Tuesdays with Morrie. He made his debut as a cinematographer in the short comedy film Kid Quick. As a cinematographer, he has since worked on films like Grand Champion, Border, The Hit, Fireflies in the Garden, Jesus Henry Christ, Highland Park, Plush, The Normal Heart, and Secret in Their Eyes. Moder has also worked on a number of short films as a cinematographer. He has also worked on The Mexican, Full Frontal, Mona Lisa Smile, Mr. & Mrs. Smith, Friends with Money, and Spider-Man 3.

== Personal life ==
Moder is the son of assistant director and producer Mike Moder, best known for Beverly Hills Cop.

He was married to Vera Steimberg from 1997 to 2002.

He met his second wife, actress Julia Roberts, on the set of her film The Mexican in 2000. After his divorce from Steimberg was finalized, he and Roberts wed on July 4, 2002, in a small ceremony at her ranch in Taos, New Mexico. They have three children.

He practices Hinduism along with his wife.

== Filmography ==
Film
Year	Film	Notes
1995	Crimson Tide	Production assistant
1996	The Fan	Camera loader
1997	The Brave	Camera loader
1998	Enemy of the State	Second assistant camera
1999	The Big Tease	Additional assistant camera
1999	Tuesdays with Morrie	Second assistant camera
2000	Jerks	First assistant camera
2000	Lucky Numbers	Second assistant camera
2000	Kid Quick	Cinematographer
2001	The Mexican	Assistant Camera
2002	Sand	Production assistant
2002	Grand Champion	Cinematographer
2002	Full Frontal	First assistant camera
2003	Mona Lisa Smile	Director of photography: 2nd Unit
2004	The Forgotten	Camera operator
2004	The San Cristobal Ranch Academy Film	Cinematographer
2005	Mr. & Mrs. Smith	Camera operator
2005	Fun with Dick and Jane	Camera operator (uncredited)
2006	Freedomland	Camera operator
2006	Friends with Money	Camera operator
2006	Déjà Vu	Camera operator
2007	Seraphim Falls	Camera operator
2007	Spider-Man 3	Camera operator
2007	Border	Cinematographer
2007	The Hit	Cinematographer
2007	The Kopper Kettle	Cinematographer
2008	Fireflies in the Garden	Cinematographer
2009	Grace	Cinematographer
2010	180° South	Cinematographer
2010	In Dreams I Run Wild	Cinematographer
2011	Jesus Henry Christ	Cinematographer
2013	Highland Park	Cinematographer
2013	Plush	Cinematographer
2013	Urban Migration	Cinematographer
2015	Secret in Their Eyes	Cinematographer
2015	Point Break	Camera operator
2016	Heaven's Floor	Additional photography
2018	Ibiza	Cinematographer
2021	Flag Day	Cinematographer
2023	Ezra	Cinematographer
2026	Miss You, Love You	Cinematographer
Television
Year	Title	Notes
2011	Extraordinary Moms	Television film, cinematographer
2014	The Normal Heart	Television film, cinematographer
2016	Animal Kingdom	Episode: "Pilot", cinematographer
2016	The Last Tycoon	Television pilot
2019	Dead to Me	Cinematographer

== Awards and nominations ==
Year	Award	Category	Work	Result
2014	Primetime Emmy Awards	Outstanding Cinematography for a Miniseries or Movie	The Normal Heart	Nominated
2014	OFTA Television Award	Best Cinematography in a Non-Series	The Normal Heart	Nominated
