= The Fabulous Four =

2024 film by Jocelyn Moorhouse

- Theatrical release poster
- Directed by: Jocelyn Moorhouse
- Written by: Ann Marie Allison; Jenna Milly
- Produced by: Richard B. Lewis; Lauren Hantz
- Starring: Susan Sarandon; Bette Midler; Megan Mullally; Sheryl Lee Ralph; Bruce Greenwood; Timothy V. Murphy; Michael Bolton
- Cinematography: Roberto Schaefer
- Edited by: Gabriella Muir
- Music by: David Hirschfelder
- Production company: Southpaw Entertainment
- Distributed by: Bleecker Street
- Release date: July 26, 2024
- Running time: 98 minutes
- Country: United States
- Language: English
- Box office: $3.5 million

The Fabulous Four is a 2024 American comedy film directed by Jocelyn Moorhouse and written by Ann Marie Allison and Jenna Milly. It stars Susan Sarandon, Bette Midler, Megan Mullally, Sheryl Lee Ralph, Bruce Greenwood, Timothy V. Murphy, and Michael Bolton.

It was released in the United States by Bleecker Street on July 26, 2024.

== Plot ==
Aging friends Kitty and Alice receive invitations to their lifelong friend Marilyn’s wedding. Hoping to reunite their gang, Kitty and Alice plan to invite old friend Lou, who had a dramatic falling-out with Marilyn after she stole her boyfriend John and eloped with him. Kitty and Alice lure Lou to the wedding in Key West, Florida by telling her she has won a raffle from the Hemingway House to win a polydactyl cat.

Kitty, Alice and Lou arrive in Key West and meet Marilyn at her house. Furious, Lou plans to leave the house, especially after finding out Kitty and Alice lied about the cat raffle. Kitty convinces her to stay, but she is still agitated by the presence of Marilyn and the constant reminders of her deceased ex-husband.

While trying on dresses, Lou becomes agitated once more when Marilyn mentions her eloping with John. Lou leaves the shop and meets a man on the street called Ted. After stopping an attempted theft of Ted’s bike, Lou is excited at the prospect of having met a man.

The next day, Marilyn takes the others on a boat to go parasailing. Alice gives a seasick Lou cannabis-infused chocolate to calm her down. While the others partake in the parasailing, Lou bonds with Ernie, the ship’s captain, who offers her cannabis-infused gummies. Now under the influence, Lou accidentally cuts the tow rope connecting the others to the boat. When they land on the beach, Marilyn laughs at Lou for being high, causing her to retaliate and berate the others for lying to her, as well as Marilyn’s TikTok obsession.

Marilyn, Kitty, and Alice throw a bachelorette party at a strip club. Kitty is surprised to see her grandson Nathan is the stripper, having been kicked out by his mother for being gay. The next day, Marilyn takes the girls to Hemingway House to meet her fiance Bradley. Lou is shocked when she finds out Bradley is actually Ted.

On the day of the wedding, Lou and Marilyn fight, causing Marilyn to fire Lou as her bridesmaid. Marilyn has a mental breakdown and apologises to Lou. At the wedding, Marilyn and Bradley realise they both rushed into the marriage, and decide to stay friends. Lou is persuaded by Ernie to move to Key West.

== Cast ==
- Susan Sarandon as Lou
- Bette Midler as Marilyn
- Megan Mullally as Alice
- Sheryl Lee Ralph as Kitty
- Sophie von Haselberg as Amanda
- Déjà Dee as Dr. Rhonda Brown
- Michael Bolton as himself
- Brandee Evans as Leslie
- Bruce Greenwood as Ted
- Renika Williams as Shivani
- Abigail Dolan as Sheila
- David Goren as Brandon
- Kadan Well Bennett as Nathan
- Timothy V. Murphy as Captain Ernie

== Production ==
In May 2022, it was announced that Susan Sarandon, Bette Midler, and Megan Mullally had joined the cast of the film, with Jocelyn Moorhouse directing from a screenplay she wrote alongside Jenna Milly and Ann Marie Allison. In October 2022, Sissy Spacek joined the cast of the film, with Bleecker Street acquiring distribution rights to the film. In October 2023, Sheryl Lee Ralph, Bruce Greenwood, and Timothy V. Murphy joined the cast of the film, with Ralph replacing Spacek, who exited due to scheduling conflicts.

Principal photography began in September 2023 in Savannah, Georgia, securing a SAG-AFTRA interim agreement.

== Reception ==
=== Box office ===
The film made $1 million in its opening weekend from 1,045 theaters, placing eighth at the box office.

=== Critical response ===
On the review aggregator website Rotten Tomatoes, 28% of 54 critics' reviews are positive. The website's consensus reads: "These four ladies are indeed fabulous, but they deserve a much more inspired script." Metacritic, which uses a weighted average, assigned the film a score of 44 out of 100, based on 15 critics, indicating "mixed or average" reviews.

Nell Minow of RogerEbert.com gave the film one and a half out of four stars and wrote, "The stars do their best to bring warmth and charisma with criminally under-written characters engaging in silly antics. There are lovely moments when they sing, including a duet with Michael Bolton(!). It just makes us wish it was a concert film. Or, as Gene Siskel used to say, we would be better off watching a film of the four actresses sitting around, talking about their lives."
