= Heaven's Floor =

- Film poster
- Directed by: Lori Stoll
- Written by: Lori Stoll
- Produced by: Justin Ford; Phil Rose; Sally Hanson; Lori Stoll; Malaya Qaunirq Chapman
- Starring: Clea DuVall; Timothy V Murphy; Toby Huss; Katie May Dunford; Nicole Sullivan
- Cinematography: George Billinger; Daniel Moder
- Edited by: Timothy Snell; Russell Denove
- Music by: J. Peter Robinson
- Production company: Road to Nowhere Film Company
- Release date: September 30, 2016 (Edmonton International Film Festival)
- Running time: 86 minutes
- Countries: Canada; United States
- Languages: English; Inuktitut

Heaven's Floor is a 2016 Canadian/American drama film written and directed by Lori Stoll. The film stars Clea DuVall, Timothy V Murphy, Toby Huss, Katie May Dunford and Nicole Sullivan. Heaven's Floor had its world premiere at the 2016 Cinequest Film Festival on March 4, 2016.

== Plot ==
Julia, a Los Angeles photographer, joins an expedition to the Canadian Arctic. She arrives ill-equipped and later finds herself stranded when she is rescued by an eleven year old Inuk girl, Malaya, and her uncle. They take Julia to a small Inuit community where she becomes attached to Malaya. Later in Los Angeles Julia learns of tragic events in the Arctic and returns to adopt Malaya. Once in Los Angeles the little girl struggles to find acceptance.

== Cast ==
- Clea DuVall as Julia
- Timothy V Murphy as Jack
- Toby Huss as Ed
- Katie May Dunford as Malaya
- Nicole Sullivan as Karen

== Awards ==
- Heaven's Floor won the Grand Jury Award at the 2016 Alaska International Film Awards
- Katie May Dunford won Best Actress at the 2016 El Dorado Film Festival.
