= Timothy V. Murphy =

Irish actor (born 1960)

- Born: Timothy Vincent Murphy; 5 April 1960 (age 66); Tralee, County Kerry, Ireland
- Occupation: Actor
- Years active: 1991–present
- Spouse: Caitlin Manley
- Children: 1

Timothy Vincent Murphy (born 5 April 1960) is an Irish actor based in Los Angeles. His notable 2015 roles have been on The Bastard Executioner, Grace and Frankie, and True Detective. He played Galen O'Shay for three seasons on the Kurt Sutter FX series, Sons of Anarchy. For his portrayal, Murphy won the 2013 BuzzFocus Readers Choice Award for "Best Villain". He appeared for two seasons on NCIS: Los Angeles as Russian super-villain Sidorov, and a season on the CBS series Criminal Minds as Emily Prentiss' nemesis/love interest, Ian Doyle. He has guest starred on such series as Hawaii Five-0, Revenge, Burn Notice, Shameless, Quantico, 24, Nip/Tuck, Alias, Six Feet Under, and Code Black.

In 2025, Murphy portrayed Colonel Sanders in the "Obsession" set of ads for KFC (Kentucky Fried Chicken).

== Early life and education ==
Murphy was born Timothy Vincent Murphy in Tralee, County Kerry to Edward and Mary Murphy, one of six siblings. He began his career in Dublin, where he trained in the Focus Theater. He attended University College Cork, majoring in Law and Accounting. Murphy also spent time travelling in South Africa, working in construction and roof laying in the Bronx, New York City, and working in bars in Florida.

== Career ==
Murphy's feature film credits include The Lone Ranger (2013); the action film parody MacGruber (2010), opposite Val Kilmer; Ed Harris' Western period drama Appaloosa (2008); the adventure thriller National Treasure: Book of Secrets (2007) and the horror thriller Shallow Ground (2004). In 2014, Murphy starred in Jason Momoa’s directorial debut, Road to Paloma; the Funk Brothers' film short Looms, which premiered at the Santa Barbara Film Festival; and the adventure drama Heaven's Floor, opposite Clea Duvall.

Murphy is also a stage actor and a Lifetime Member of the Actors Studio. His theatre credits include The Beauty Queen of Leenane at South Coast Rep, for which he garnered an Ovation Award nomination, and Coast Theater's The Lost Plays of Tennessee Williams, which won the LA Weekly "Best Ensemble" Award and for which he garnered an individual "Best Performance" nomination. He originated the role of Jake in the world premiere of Stones in his Pockets at the Tivoli Theater in Dublin, and he starred opposite Tyne Daly in a production of Agamemnon staged at the Getty Villa in Malibu, California. In August 2018, he started appearing in advertisements for British price-comparison site Confused.com.

== Personal life ==
He is married to Caitlin Manley. On 22 July 2015, their first child, Seán Fionn Murphy, was born.

== Filmography ==
=== Film ===
Year	Title	Role	Notes
1991	Home Straight	-	Short
1999	The Doorman	Milo	
2001	The Scary Side of Randall Coombe	-	
2002	The Honorable	Milo	
2002	It Could Happen	Sammy Fingleton	Short
2003	The Perfect Wife	Tim	
2003	Murder, She Wrote: The Celtic Riddle	Inspector O'Dwyer	TV movie
2003	Holding Out Hope	Mark	
2003	Paddy Takes a Meeting	Paddy	Short
2003	Red Roses and Petrol	Eamonn	
2004	Skeleton Man	Sergeant Terry	TV movie
2004	Shallow Ground	Jack Sheppard	
2005	Pit Fighter	Father Michael	
2005	What's Up, Scarlet?	Vladamir Borshkoff	
2007	Manband the Movie	R.S. Smoothskin	
2007	The Antique	Tom	Short
2007	National Treasure: Book of Secrets	Seth	
2008	Appaloosa	Vince Sullivan	
2008	Beatrice	Chris	Short
2009	Green Street Hooligans 2	Max	Video
2009	The Butcher	Tyke	
2009	Farewell to the Sparrow	-	Short
2010	The Sierra	Bob	Short
2010	MacGruber	Constantine Bach	
2010	Madso's War	Kieran Graner	TV movie
2010	Treasure of the Black Jaguar	Blake West	
2010	Love & Vengeance	-	Short
2011	Bowman	Bowman	Short
2011	Amber Lake	Sergeant Eugene Stockard	
2011	Take a Seat	Reynold	Short
2012	Not That Funny	Finneas Patrick O'Neill	
2012	Delete	"Snake"	Short
2012	Lost Angeles	Cliff	
2012	Taken 3: Back to Normal	Ryan Bills	Short
2012	Dark Canyon	Warden Cullen Logan	
2013	The Frankenstein Theory	Karl McCallion	
2013	The Lone Ranger	Fritz	
2013	To Hell with a Bullet	Dr. Nick Devyril	
2013	Dystopia	Marc	Short
2013	The Deal	The Man	Short
2014	Road to Paloma	FBI Agent Al Williams	
2014	Looms	Farmer	Short
2014	Hot Bath an' a Stiff Drink	Dutch Winfield	
2014	Keyhole	Husband	Short
2015	New Earth on the Barrens	Felix	Short
2016	No Way to Live	Detective Frank Giddins	
2016	Heaven's Floor	Jack	
2017	Tragedy Girls	Sheriff Blane Welch	
2017	Across My Land	Frank	Short
2017	Anything	Isidore	
2018	Roisin Dubh	Barak	Short
2018	The Ninth Passenger	Silas	
2018	Fuerteventura	Admiral	Short
2019	Cuck	Bill	
2019	In Full Bloom	Roane	
2020	Broil	August Sinclair	
2020	Paa	Randall	Short
2020	Bad Suns	Jones Jones III	Short
2020	Breach	Captain Stanley	
2021	Hell Hath No Fury	Jerry	
2021	New Year	Ben	
2022	American Siege	Charles Rutledge	
2022	Delilah	Gus	Short
2022	Playing Through	James Grantham	
2023	Detective Knight: Independence	Vincent	
2023	Resurrected	Father Flynn	
2023	Fire Island	"Murph" Murphy	
2023	Mob Land	Deputy Ben	
2023	Herd	Sterling	
2024	The Fabulous Four	Captain Ernie	
2025	Ride or Die	Tim	Short
2025	Guns Up	Lonny Castigan	
2026	Stay in the Car	Mike	Short
2026	Vampires of the Velvet Lounge	Eric	
2026	Above & Below	TBA	Post-production

=== Television ===
Year	Title	Role	Notes
1995	Glenroe	Conor Sheehy	Episode: "Conor's Last Stand"
2001	The District	Martin McBride	Episode: "Old Ghosts"
2001	V.I.P.	General Volykov	Episode: "Chasing Anna"
2002	Six Feet Under	Louis Winchell	Episode: "Someone Else's Eyes"
2003	Fastlane	Riley Morrison	Episode: "Simone Says"
2003	The Agency	IRA Man	Episode: "Spy Finance"
2003	Alias	Avery Russet	Episode: "A Missing Link"
2004	Nip/Tuck	Quinn	Episode: "Joel Gideon"
2006	24	Schaeffer	Recurring Cast: Season 5
2008	Gemini Division	Agent A	Recurring Cast: Season 1
2010	CSI: NY	Conner Wells	Episode: "The Formula"
2011	Shameless	Vlad	Recurring Cast: Season 1
2011	Chuck	Father of the Bride	Episode: "Chuck Versus the Wedding Planner"
2011	Criminal Minds	Ian Doyle	Recurring Cast: Season 6, Guest: Season 7
2011–13	Sons of Anarchy	Galen O'Shay	Recurring Cast: Season 4–6
2012	Fairly Legal	Captain Maiken	Episode: "Bait & Switch"
2012	Longmire	Ephraim Hostetler	Episode: "The Dark Road"
2012	Burn Notice	Vincent Durov	Episode: "Official Business"
2012	Hell on Wheels	Bauer	Episode: "Slaughterhouse"
2012	Revenge	Dmitri Bladoff	Episode: "Lineage"
2012–13	NCIS: Los Angeles	Isaak Sidorov	Recurring Cast: Season 4, Guest: Season 5
2013	BlackBoxTV Presents	Gordon	Episode: "The Audition"
2014	Perception	Monsignor Eugene Norris	Episode: "Possession"
2014	Hawaii Five-0	Nick "Valentine" Mercer	Episode: "Ka Noeʻau"
2015	Scorpion	Dimitri Kreshenko	Episode: "Once Bitten, Twice Die"
2015	Grace and Frankie	Byron	Recurring Cast: Season 1
2015	True Detective	Osip Agranov	Recurring Cast: Season 2
2015	The Bastard Executioner	Father Ruskin	Main Cast
2016	Code Black	Dr. Dimitri Volkov	Episode: "What Lies Beneath"
2017	Chicago P.D.	Zadra	Episode: "Don't Bury This Case"
2017	An Klondike	"Peachy" Taylor	Main Cast: Season 2
2017	The Last Man on Earth	Benjamin Brinton	Episode: "Got Milk?"
2017–18	Damnation	Gram Turner	Recurring Cast
2018	The Magicians	Man with the Overdue Library Book	Episode: "The Tales of the Seven Keys"
2018	Westworld	Coughlin	Recurring Cast: Season 2
2018	Taken	Lynch	Episode: "Carapace"
2018	Quantico	Conor Devlin	Recurring Cast: Season 3
2019	Charmed	Demon Boss	Episode: "When Sparks Fly"
2019	The Man in the High Castle	Adolf Eichmann	Episode: "For Want of a Nail"
2020	LA's Finest	Logan Kline	Recurring Cast: Season 2
2020–21	Snowpiercer	Commander Grey	Recurring Cast: Season 1, Guest: Season 2
2021	MacGruber	Constantine Bach	Episode: "The Hungry Lion"
2021–22	S.W.A.T.	Arthur Novak	Recurring Cast: Season 5
2023	Law & Order: Organized Crime	Eamonn Murphy	Recurring Cast: Season 3
2023	The Company You Keep	Patrick Mcguire	Recurring Cast
2023	Tacoma FD	Gerkins Richárd	Episode: "Big Trouble in Little Belgium"
2025	The Kollective	Kuzmin	Episode: "Episode #1.2"
2025	Doc	Chaplain Eamon O'Leary	Episode: "Saints and Sinners"
2025	The Abandons	Father Killian Duffy	Recurring Cast

=== Music videos ===
Year	Artist	Song	Role
2006	Christina Aguilera	"Hurt"	The Father
2011	Noel Gallagher's High Flying Birds	"If I Had a Gun"	Father of the Bride
2014	Randy Houser	"Like a Cowboy"	Wesley O'Banion

=== Video games ===
Year	Game	Role
2010	Mafia II	Additional Voices (voice)
2016	Call of Duty: Modern Warfare Remastered	Cosgrave (voice)
