= Hiroyuki Watanabe =

Japanese actor (1955–2022)

- 渡辺 裕之
- Born: December 9, 1955; Ibaraki, Japan
- Died: May 3, 2022 (aged 66); Kanagawa, Japan
- Education: Takushoku University
- Occupation: Actor
- Years active: 1980–2022
- Spouse: Hideko Hara (m. 1994)

Hiroyuki Watanabe (渡辺 裕之, Watanabe Hiroyuki; December 9, 1955 – May 3, 2022) was a Japanese actor. He primarily acted in dramas, of which a handful are tokusatsu series. One of his latest roles was as Taiga Saejima in the tokusatsu series GARO. He also played Kamen Rider Gaoh in the Kamen Rider Den-O movie, Kamen Rider Den-O: I'm Born!.

== Life and career ==
Watanabe was born on December 9, 1955, in Mito, Ibaraki Prefecture. He graduated from Takushoku University, Faculty of Commerce. During his studies at the university, he learned German while working for the German airline company Lufthansa. Watanabe also spoke English.

Watanabe began his career in entertainment by appearing in a Coca-Cola television commercial in 1980.

He married actress Hideko Hara (原 日出子, Hara Hideko) in 1994.

Watanabe was found dead at his private gym in the basement of his home on May 3, 2022, and his death was announced by his management agency on May 5. The cause of death was reportedly suicide by hanging.

In a statement released through her agency, Hara said that during the self-isolation period forced by COVID-19, Watanabe began to express anxiety and was having trouble sleeping. He had been diagnosed with dysautonomia and was beginning treatment around the time of his death.

== Filmography ==
=== Films ===
- On the Road (1982)
- Shinjuku Outlaw (1994)
- Gamera: Guardian of the Universe (1995)
- Gamera 2: Attack of Legion (1996)
- Gamera 3: Revenge of Iris (1999)
- Godzilla, Mothra and King Ghidorah: Giant Monsters All-Out Attack (2001) – Yutaka Hirose
- Cromartie High - The Movie (2005) - Freddie
- Kamen Rider Den-O: I'm Born! (2007) - Kamen Rider Gaoh
- Baton (2009) - Robot Guard (voice)
- Everly (2014) - Taiko
- Day and Night (2019) - Kazuyuki Akashi
- In Full Bloom (2020) - Tetsuro Tokugawa
- Iyashi no Kokoromi (2020)
- Labyrinth of Cinema (2020)
- A Dog Named Palma (2021)
- Nobutora (2021) - Oda Nobunaga
- Tears of Persephone (2022)
- Popran (2022)
- 1446: An Eternal Minute (2022)
- Sadako DX (2022, released posthumously)
- Tora no Ryūgi (2022, released posthumously)
- Tora no Ryūgi 2 (2022, released posthumously)
- Ginji the Speculator (2022, released posthumously)
- Twilight Cinema Blues (2023, released posthumously)

=== Television ===
- Ai no Arashi (1986), adult Takeshi (Japanese adaptation of Wuthering Heights)
- Shōjo Commando Izumi (1987) - Rinichiro Ishizu
- Tōyama no Kin-san (1992)
- Onihei Hankachō (1994)
- Ultraman Gaia (1998) - Commander Akio Ishimuro
- Aoi (2000) - Asano Yoshinaga
- Oyabun wa Jesus Sama (2000) – Jesus Christ
- Toshiie and Matsu (2002) - Ikeda Tsuneoki
- GARO (2005-2006) – Taiga Saejima
- GARO: Beast of the White Night (2006) – Taiga Saejima
- LoveDeath (2006)
- Karate-Robo Zaborgar (2011)
- No Side Manager (2019) - Saburō Tsuda

=== Japanese dubbing ===
- Batman – Bruce Wayne (Michael Keaton)
- Batman Returns – Bruce Wayne (Michael Keaton)
- Cocktail (1991 Fuji TV edition) – Brian Flanagan (Tom Cruise)
- Top Gun (1989 Fuji TV edition) – Maverick (Tom Cruise)
