= Devix Szell =

American actor, singer and filmmaker

Devix Szell is an American musician, vocalist, actir, videographer and filmmaker. Musically, he is known for his work with the band Symbolism George Lynch's side project called The Banishment and his solo project The Killer Machines. When it comes to his indepdent work he is know for working on film and music video projects. Szell was interviewed in The Rolling Stone regarding the consequences of artificial intelligence use in film.

== Early life and education ==
Szell was born in Glendora, California and spent his adolescence practicing guitar, writing original music, and playing experimental noise shows with local punk bands. He attended Carden Academy from kindergarten through eighth grade. Szell began his music career performing with Symbolism, Stayte, Narcosis Design, and MomenTem. As an adult he continued studying theater and drama and took additional training classes at the Actors Studio in Los Angeles under the mentorship of Martin Landau and Barbara Bain.

== Career ==
=== Symbolism ===
As a musician, Szell joined the band Symbolism, which included members: Christian Death, Rikk Agnew on guitar, James McGearty on bass, London May on drums. Before settling on the official lineup, the band auditioned many different singers and drummers including former Christians Death drummer George Belanger.

Szell was introduced to the band through Vincent Price of Body Count. After recording a demo tape with him, Devix was invited to the studio and soon became the new singer of Symbolism.

For the songwriting, McGearty and Agnew wrote the riffs and revised old musical ideas from the 1980s. The group later re-arranged the material with Szell and May as a group. The album was produced by Bill Metoyer. (he produced Slayer, W.A.S.P., Cirith Ungol and other projects.

The album was finished before the Covid-19 pandemic but delayed the planned performances of the record.

=== The Banishment ===
In 2020, Szell joined The Banishment, a project created by guitarist George Lynch and musician Joe Haze. Devix became the vocalist of the band. He appeared on the Banishment's debut album Machine + Bone that was released in 2023.

Terry Craven of Velvet Thunder described Szell’s contribution to the album Machine + Bone by The Banishment as bringing “distinctly punk aggression to the project”. Szell was involved in the production and mixing of the record along with Paul Barker, Sean Kent, and Draven Michael Bailery.

=== Solo work and songwriting ===
In 2024, Devix Szell released his self-titled solo album. He produced and mixed the album himself. The album includes industrial, post-punk, goth and electronic influences drawing heavily on 1980s and 1990s industrial music with production that included distorted guitars, synths, samples, programmed drum machines, and layered vocals. The album features artists such as Paul Barker, Ryan Crane, Sean Kent, and Draven Michael Bailey.

Szell contributed as a composer to a few film soundtracks. His work can be found in Catherine Hardicke's Plush, Jamie Deacon's Way to Blue, and Susanne Landau's Stick and Poke. Devix solo composition "Parting of the Spirit" is found in Plush which led him to compose music for Way to Blue and Stick and Poke.

Szhell has also collaborated with musicians and produces including Sean Beavan, Brett Fisher, Rob Grimmet, and Hannah Cowley.

=== The Killing Machines ===
Szell’s second album, The Killing Machines, was described by Szell to be ''original dreampunk – bridging audio and visual styles into a darkly engaging artistic realm that is distinctly his own.'' The album was released in 2025. One song on his record "Flatlines," describes the difficulties faced by independent musicians in todays music industry, including the influence of social media algorithms and important of large followings to attract attention. For live performances of his record, Szell invites other musicians to collaborate and transform the music to be played live. He described as the music now can become its own "organism" as a way of getting beyond his own ego.

The live band was called after the record The Killing Machines. The band's lineup includes Delano Durant on drums, Danius Čarauskas on bass, and Kyle Steffan on synthesizers, and Ryan Crane or Wess Willis depending on who is available.

=== Film and visual work ===
Szell has directed music videos for himself and for different artists. According to Regen Magazine, this music video making is his "second soul," following the anti-marketing and deconstructionist ideas. Szell has worked in film production and contributed to many projects in the industry. Some of his credits include The Banishment, Lynch Mob, Billy Morrison, and Ministry. Other highlights are:

- The Banishment - 'Got What You Wanted' (2023)
- Lynch Mob - 'Time After Time' (2023)
- Billy Morrison - 'Drowning' (2024)
- Billy Morrison (featuring Ozzy Osbourne) - Crack Cocaine (executive producer) (2024)
- Ministry - 'B.D.E' (2024)
- Ministry - 'New Religion' (2024)

=== Acting ===
Szell has appeared as an actor in Zombies (2018), Plush, and 13/13/13.

In an interview with Rolling Stone, Szell discussed his experience as a background actor on a Los Angeles production was interviewed in the Rolling Stone regarding the use of artificial intelligence in the film industry. He shared his story from a background acting job he worked in Los Angeles. According to Szell, he was photographed of by many cameras in high-tech 360-degree scan but was not given a contract describing clearly what would happen to the media in the future and the subsequent use limits.

== Discography ==
=== Studio albums ===
- The Narcosis Design - Falling Through The Flame (2005)
- MomenTem - Red Line (2011)
- Paul Barker - Fix This!!! (2012)
- Heroine's Habit - Singer (2012)
- Score Composer (2013)
