= List of Kamen Rider Den-O episodes =

This is a list of episodes of the 2007 Japanese television series Kamen Rider Den-O. Episode titles prefaced with a red line signify an episode centered on the story of Kamen Rider Den-O. Episode titles prefaced with a green line signify an episode centered on the story of Kamen Rider Zeronos.

== Episodes ==
No.	Title	Directed by	Written by	Original release date
1	"Here I Come!"; Transliteration: "Ore, Sanjō!" (Japanese: 俺、参上！)	Ryuta Tasaki	Yasuko Kobayashi	January 28, 2007
The story starts with Ryotaro Nogami on his bike lodged in the top branches of a tree through a strange string of bad luck. After being let down, he rides his bike into the city, runs over broken glass, and crashes next to a group of young men led by Tetsuo. After being beat up, Ryotaro discovers an unusual pass. Just as he picks it up and enters a building, the landscape abruptly changes into a valley where he finds a train and a woman on it who gives him a cup of coffee. Ryotaro is later confronted by a young woman on the train, who says that she lost the pass that Ryotaro found. He leaves, finding Tetsuo's gang, and is then possessed by a strange force and beats up the gang members until he manages to prevent the possessing force from going too far. Ryotaro then finds Tetsuo and the girl on the train, and it is revealed that Tetsuo is also being possessed by a monster called an Imagin. The Bat Imagin attacks Ryotaro, until the girl tells him to use the pass to become Kamen Rider Den-O, as Ryotaro is what is known as a "Singularity Point." Ryotaro, in Plat Form, is losing when the Imagin that had possessed him tells him to switch places, transforming into Den-O Sword Form. Sword Form easily beats Bat Imagin, and then Ryotaro boards the Train of Time, the DenLiner.
2	"Ride on Time"; Transliteration: "Raido On Taimu" (Japanese: ライド・オン・タイム)	Ryuta Tasaki	Yasuko Kobayashi	February 4, 2007
After boarding the DenLiner, the girl introduces herself as Hana, and the woman who gave him coffee introduces herself as Naomi. The Imagin that had possessed him also shows his form, taking the form of a red oni which Ryotaro believes is from the story of Momotarō, eventually naming the Imagin "Momotaros". Ryotaro confronts Tetsuo's gang, and they reveal to him that Tetsuo is looking for his jingle bell key holder, which Hana had mistakenly picked up when she first was looking for the Rider Pass. Ryotaro returns the key holder to Tetsuo, and inadvertently completes the contract the Bat Imagin made with the boy, allowing the Imagin to travel to the past and alter the course of time. The date is December 24, 2004, the night that Tetsuo's mother died and he was not there by her side. Ryotaro travels to the past as Kamen Rider Den-O Sword Form and destroys the Bat Imagin, but the Imagin goes berserk and became Gigandeath Heaven, a giant monster. Den-O then uses the DenLiner Gouka and its various weapons to destroy the Gigandeath. After the Gigandeath is destroyed, Ryotaro decides to make a slight change: using the DenLiner to take Tetsuo to be with his mother at her final moments.
3	"Outlaw Momotarō"; Transliteration: "Autorō Momotarō" (Japanese: アウトロー・モモタロー)	Takao Nagaishi	Yasuko Kobayashi	February 11, 2007
In a twist of bad luck, Ryotaro is knocked out by the actions of a man named Yū Yamagoshi who is being chased by Yakuza to whom he owes money. Momotaros takes control of the unconscious boy's body, and impresses Yamagoshi with his power. Thanks to Momotaros, Ryotaro ends up being pursued by the police only to be saved by Hana. Yamagoshi, after escaping himself, comes across the Chameleon Imagin and makes a wish for an amount of money "to die for." Momotaros is then ordered by Hana not to use Ryotaro's body as the Imagin wishes, even though he and Yamagoshi plan to assault the Yakuza, again, in order to get more money from them. Before Momotaros can assist Yamagoshi, Hana arrives to knock some sense into the Imagin, and the Chameleon Imagin appeared. Den-O Sword Form fights with the Imagin, who flees. Before Momotaros can do anything else, Ryotaro wakes up, kicks Momotaros back onto the DenLiner, and finds himself surrounded by Yamagoshi and the Yakuza.
4	"Get Out, Oni! I'm Serious"; Transliteration: "Oni wa Soto! Boku wa Maji" (Japanese: 鬼は外！僕はマジ)	Takao Nagaishi	Yasuko Kobayashi	February 18, 2007
Ryotaro, furious that Momotaros had involved him in a robbery, decides to stop asking for the Imagin's help in battles. Later, the Chameleon Imagin shows up at Yamagoshi's apartment, leaving the young man large amounts of money that the Imagin had stole on his own. This completes the contract Yamagoshi had made with the Imagin, allowing him to travel back in time to the day that Yamagoshi had given up his chances to have a career in music and helped a young girl, instead. When Ryotaro travels to the past to battle the Chameleon Imagin, he soon discovers that he cannot defeat Chameleon Imagin. He realizes that he needs Momotaros' assistance, but only if Momotaros apologizes for his actions in endangering him. Momotaros begrudgingly apologizes, and Den-O is able to destroy Chameleon Imagin with an Extreme Slash.
5	"Will You Let Me Fish You?"; Transliteration: "Boku ni Tsuraretemiru?" (Japanese: 僕に釣られてみる？)	Taro Sakamoto	Yasuko Kobayashi	February 25, 2007
Ryotaro soon finds himself involved in a truck accident, losing consciousness, and being possessed by another Imagin, a blue turtle-like Imagin who is later named Urataros, after Urashima Tarō. Momotaros senses this and tried to get Urataros out, yet at the same time Urataros' personality takes over and becomes the nursing staff's idol at the hospital, easily wooing any woman that he confronts. As Momotaros and Urataros use Ryotaro's body as a battlefield, another Imagin, the Crust Imagin, opens a contract with a young soccer player named Daiki Saitō. The Imagin begins to attack all of Daiki's former teammates, hospitalizing them as well. Momotaros finally retakes control of Ryotaro's body and attempts to defeat the Crust Imagin, but due to the strain that he and Urataros place on Ryotaro's body, Den-O is unable to destroy the Crust Imagin.
6	"A Swindler's Dignity"; Transliteration: "Sagishi no Hinkaku" (Japanese: サギ師の品格)	Taro Sakamoto	Yasuko Kobayashi	March 4, 2007
Still weary from his battle with the Crust Imagin, Ryotaro has to decide what to do with Urataros, whose lies to allow him to take control of Ryotaro's weak body and continue his flirtations with the women of Tokyo. The Crust Imagin continues to attack Daiki's former teammates, until he reveals that he was the one initiated the contract. When the contract is completed, the Crust Imagin travels to the date in the past when Daiki had lost a soccer game, alienating him from his teammates. When the DenLiner travels back to this date, the Owner of the DenLiner confronts Ryotaro asking him if he wants to extend his Rider Pass to include Urataros. To everyone's shock and Momotaros's distress, Ryotaro agrees, believing that Urataros has a good heart despite his lies. When Den-O Sword Form fights the Crust Imagin, he is dragged into the water and so Ryotaro transforms into Den-O Rod Form. The Crust Imagin is defeated by a Solid Attack and a DenRider Kick, but goes berserk and becomes Gigandeath Hades. Rod Form then uses his section of the DenLiner, Isurugi, to defeat the giant monster.
7	"Jealousy Bomber"; Transliteration: "Jerashī Bonbā" (Japanese: ジェラシー・ボンバー)	Hidenori Ishida	Yasuko Kobayashi	March 11, 2007
After a night out on the town while possessed by Urataros, Ryotaro awakes to find himself in the home of a strange woman named Yumi Saitō. As he rushes out of her home, her ex-boyfriend Tomoya Ōbayashi passes by and becomes jealous, feeling that he is the only man for Yumi. He finds Ryotaro's wallet and goes to return it to the Milk Dipper so that he can fight the young man, but is easily distracted and calmed down by Ryotaro's sister Airi. Meanwhile, people associated with anything that plays Vivaldi's The Four Seasons' First Concerto, "Spring", are attacked by the Crow Imagin, who has made a contract with Yumi. After a short battle with the Imagin as Den-O Sword Form, Ryotaro returns home and is confronted by Tomoya, who cause worst something when Ryotaro hasn't retrieved Yumi. Ryotaro will get punched by him and Airi calls him "Ryou-chan!". If he doesn't retrieves her, Tomoya end up explodes her cafe by watching Seigi and Issē's shocked and Airi's screams in horror. When Ryotaro finds her to get her to speak with her ex-boyfriend, they are ambushed by the Crow Imagin, who escapes before Den-O is able to fight back.
8	"Sad Melody, Loving Memory"; Transliteration: "Ai Merodī Ai Memorī" (Japanese: 哀メロディ・愛メモリー)	Hidenori Ishida	Yasuko Kobayashi	March 18, 2007
After Tomoya orders Ryotaro to find Yumi, she tells Ryotaro that she refuses to come see her ex-fiance after their breakup half a year ago. This discussion leads Ryotaro to realize that Yumi's wish to the Crow Imagin is to actually forget her boyfriend rather than the music the necklace he gave her played. Suddenly, the Crow Imagin appears and destroys the necklace she had been given by Tomoya that played The Four Seasons' First Concerto out of freewill to finish the contract between the two of them. The Crow Imagin goes back in time to the day of Tomoya and Yumi's wedding after which she left him at the altar. Ryotaro first retrieves the original necklace and then uses both Rod and Sword forms to finally defeat Crow Imagin. In the present time, Yumi finally shows up at the Milk Dipper to reunite with Tomoya once again.
9	"You Wept Over My Strength"; Transliteration: "Ore no Tsuyosa ni Omae ga Naita" (Japanese: 俺の強さにお前が泣いた)	Takao Nagaishi	Yasuko Kobayashi	March 25, 2007
Ryotaro encounters a person possessed by an Imagin who was strong enough to defeat Momotaros. The next day, Ryotaro and Hana arrive at the Milk Dipper, learning from Ozaki that there have been mysterious attacks on martial artists, all who were involved in last year's karate tournament. Their search leads them to the dojo of Shinji Kikuchi, the winner of last year's tournament. Ryotaro later faces Masaru Honjō, the host of the Imagin who was able to defeat him earlier, with a match between Den-O and the gold Imagin. During the fight, the Rhino Imagin appears, and declares that he's the one commencing the attacks. Den-O then fights Rhino Imagin, whom escapes before Urataros can destroy him.
10	"Hana in a Stormy Singularity Point"; Transliteration: "Hana ni Arashi no Tokuiten" (Japanese: ハナに嵐の特異点)	Takao Nagaishi	Yasuko Kobayashi	April 1, 2007
Ryotaro comes to believe that the gold Imagin is a good person, but the Rhino Imagin attacks again. Hana soon realizes that the gold Imagin is surprisingly different from the Rhino Imagin who is only intent on granting Shinji's wish and nothing more. Ryotaro discovers that Kikuchi is the contractor for Rhino Imagin, who completes his contract after confronting Honjō. Rhino Imagin travels back to the date of the karate tournament when Kikuchi won by default because Honjō suffered from a heart attack before the match could commence. In the midst of the fight, the gold Imagin arrives to save Honjō and Kikuchi at the cost of his life. To save the Imagin's life, Ryotaro allows him into his body. Thus, he earns a new form, Den-O Ax Form, to defeat the Rhino Imagin and then his Gigandeath form, Gigandeath Hell, with Rekkō. After the fight, Naomi decides upon a name for the gold Imagin, Kintaros, after Kintarō.
11	"Madness, Delusion, Baby's Breath"; Transliteration: "Bōsō Mōsō Kasumisō" (Japanese: 暴走・妄想・カスミ草)	Taro Sakamoto	Shōji Yonemura	April 8, 2007
When top preteen model Kasumi Kobayashi finds a bouquet baby's breath left for her, she is misled into thinking that Ryotaro is the mysterious fan who has been leaving similar bouquets for her (he was carrying one for the Milk Dipper). After seeing Ryotaro's strength while possessed by Kintaros, Kasumi contracts him as a body guard, in hopes to prevented any future ruins in her fashion show of the Parisian collection. Even though he is not the one leaving her baby's breath, Kintaros vowed to protect Kasumi while helping her reconcile with her father. Soon after that, the culprit of the attacks, the Ivy Imagin, arrives. Though Momotaros initially battles as Sword Form, Kintaros, after misinterpreting a word, removes him to fight the Ivy Imagin, whom he lets escape. During all of this, Hana finds the Ivy Imagin's contract holder, who is none other than Kensaku Kobayashi, Kasumi's father.
12	"Run Taros!"; Transliteration: "Hashire Tarosu!" (Japanese: 走れタロス！)	Taro Sakamoto	Shōji Yonemura	April 15, 2007
Kintaros reveals that his reason for letting the Ivy Imagin escape is to find out what Kensaku had wished for. The next day, the Ivy Imagin once again attacks Kasumi while she is heading to the airport to model for the Paris Collection. Once the Ivy Imagin stops attacking, Kintaros throws the empty van that Kasumi and her agent were riding in into the river so she will be able to see her father. However, this fulfills the Ivy Imagin's contract with Kensaku, allowing him to go back in time to the day that Kensaku kicked Kasumi out of the house. When Kintaros tries to make the father and daughter make up in the past prior to actually fighting the Ivy Imagin, he endangers the flow of time as a result and is to be banished off the DenLiner. However, Kintaros' act of informing Kasumi of her father's true feelings alter time so that Kasumi and Kensaku are able to reconcile prior to Kasumi's meeting with Ryotaro and Kensaku's meeting with the Imagin. This time paradox negates Kintaros' banishment from the DenLiner, for the cause of the banishment never existed.
13	"Okay? Your Answer Doesn't Matter"; Transliteration: "Ii? Kotae wa Kiitenai" (Japanese: いい？答えは聞いてない)	Osamu Kaneda	Yasuko Kobayashi	April 22, 2007
Miura believes that Ryotaro is being possessed by evil spirits, and in an attempt to hypnotize the boy, he accidentally awakens an Imagin hidden deep inside Ryotaro. Elsewhere, Shūji Toyama makes a contract with the Owl Imagin in the park in hopes of creating a safe place for animals to live in from the dance group that his young friend Rēji is part of. As the Owl Imagin attempts to force everyone out of the park, it runs into Hana, who is ultimately saved by Ryotaro. However, Ryotaro is still possessed by the unknown Imagin, and is able to transform into Den-O Gun Form. Gun Form's reckless battle style causes severe damage to the surroundings, but is able to drive the Owl Imagin away nonetheless. Before the Imagin possessing Ryotaro leaves, he tells Hana and the other Imagin that his goal is simply to defeat Ryotaro. In the process, he is able to drive Momotaros, Urataros, and Kintaros back into the DenLiner. Despite the Imagin's attempt to attack Hana for getting in his way, Ryotaro is able to regain control of his body before the Imagin can hurt her.
14	"Dance With Dragon"; Transliteration: "Dansu Wizu Doragon" (Japanese: ダンス・ウィズ・ドラゴン)	Osamu Kaneda	Yasuko Kobayashi	April 29, 2007
With the mysterious Imagin, who names himself Ryutaros, now one of the Imagin with connections to Ryotaro, he sets his sights on destroying Ryotaro to become the conductor of the DenLiner. Momotaros, Urataros, and Kintaros put aside their differences try to get rid of him, but with a ticket to the DenLiner, this is impossible. Meanwhile, Hana tries to find the Owl Imagin and its contract holder, as the Owl Imagin continues to make it so no human may enter the park. It is not until Ryutaros is distracted by some stray animals that allows for Momotaros to regain control of Ryotaro in order to go back in time to February 20, 1997, and prevent the Owl Imagin from destroying the past. However, in the middle of the fight, Ryutaros repossesses Ryotaro and Gun Form is the one to finish off the Owl Imagin. When the Owl Imagin goes berserk and splits into Gigandeaths Heaven and Hades, it takes both Gun Form's Wild Shot and the DenLiner Ikazuchi to defeat them.
15	"Bath Jack Panic"; Transliteration: "Basu Jakku Panikku" (Japanese: 銭湯(バス)ジャック・パニック)	Hidenori Ishida	Shōji Yonemura	May 6, 2007
In a string of bad luck while out shopping, Ryotaro's bike is stolen and he becomes a hostage of the thief in a public bathhouse along with another man named Shūjirō Hakamada. While Ryotaro is held hostage, his sister is contacted by the robber and the Whale Imagin begins attacking fishermen. After much confusion, Hana and Ryotaro both end up in the bathhouse after a failed attack on the Whale Imagin. When Airi enters and begins to make lunch for the group, the SWAT team arrives. However, it is revealed that the entire situation provides no threat as the gun is fake. The Whale Imagin appears again and Urataros fights it, only letting it escape because of less-than-favorable fishing conditions. Hakamada discovers that the targets have been his former co-workers, and Ryotaro investigates Takonoko Heavy Industries. He discovers that its former president, Kōsaku Higuchi, is the Imagin's contract holder and Ryutaros takes over in an attempt to kill the president, only to be distracted by the Whale Imagin who is driven away easily by Gun Form.
16	"Star of Happiness, Criminal's Surrender"; Transliteration: "Kōfuku no Hoshi, Kōfuku no Hoshi" (Japanese: 幸福の星、降伏の犯人(ホシ))	Hidenori Ishida	Shōji Yonemura	May 13, 2007
Once Ryutaros believes that he has destroyed the Whale Imagin, he goes after President Higuchi, again, but the president escapes. Ryotaro then returns to the bathhouse and tells Hakamada that he was unable to set things straight with the company president. When Ryutaros feels that Airi is in trouble, he takes over Ryotaro and exits the bathhouse and disseminates the police siege with his dancing. When Ryotaro tries to discuss things with Higuchi, again, Ryutaros takes control, again, and tries to kill the president. However, Momotaros is able to partially take control of Ryotaro and text message Airi to tell him to stop, as Ryutaros will only listen to Airi. Finally, Ryotaro is able to discuss things with the president, and they are able to find the Whale Imagin just before it attacks its final target and complete the contract. Ryotaro then travels back to March 31, 2004, the day that Higuchi tossed the company's money while drunk. Momotaros, as Den-O Sword Form, easily destroys the Whale Imagin before it can do much damage. With the money back, Hakamada was clear of all charges. He and the thief wished to turn themselves in, only to learn that the police were actually after an armed robber in the bank next door.
17	"That Guy Just Now! Already in the Past?"; Transliteration: "Ano Hito wa Ima! Mo Kako?" (Japanese: あの人は今！も過去？)	Taro Sakamoto	Yasuko Kobayashi	May 20, 2007
Ryotaro is hospitalized, again, due to the stress of the Imagin in his body, and because of this Hana terminates the employment of the Taros Imagin. One of Ryotaro's high school friends, Yuka Sawada, pays him a visit after spending a year in England and when she starts to pine about her former high school days, she inadvertently opens a contract with the Wolf Imagin. While Airi left Ryotaro to look after the Milk Dipper, Momotaros, Urataros, and Kintaros seek to show which one of them is more useful by trying to have him serve coffee to Miura and Ozaki. While on the DenLiner, Ryutaros reveals that an Imagin had made a contract with Yuka. The Wolf Imagin had been vaporizing high school girls and taking their belongings to Yuka to complete its contract with her so she can relive her high school days. When Hana and Ryotaro find her, the Wolf Imagin travels back to April 7, 2004, the day that Yuka was transferred to the school in England. In the middle of the fight, Ryotaro is knocked into the mysterious man in the trenchcoat, and the man drops his pocket watch. Ryotaro recognizes the watch, but the man leaves and Ryotaro is attacked by the Wolf Imagin. After the fight, Ryotaro sees the mysterious man, and gives chase, recognizing him as his sister's fiancé, Yuto Sakurai.
18	"A Clockwork Fiance"; Transliteration: "Tokei Jikake no Fianse" (Japanese: 時計じかけの婚約者(フィアンセ))	Taro Sakamoto	Yasuko Kobayashi	May 27, 2007
Ryotaro is disheartened that he is not able to find the man he believed to be Yūto Sakurai, and the Wolf Imagin goes into hiding, infuriated that it is trapped in 2004 with nothing to target. After returning to the DenLiner, Ryotaro explains his reasons: the mysterious man who appeared in the past is actually Yuto Sakurai who had disappeared three years ago, making Airi lose her memories of him. While everyone lets Ryotaro rest, the Wolf Imagin decides to destroy everything and everyone out of frustration on April 8, 2004. Back on the DenLiner, Kintaros asks Ryotaro to give him a wish to grant so he can leave Ryotaro to relieve the physical strain on Ryotaro's body, with Momotaros and Urataros having the same notion themselves. Ryutaros simply reveals that Ryotaro had actually been training too hard. At first, Momotaros is reluctant to fight because Ryotaro was being sneaky, and only became Sword Form after he promised to be honest. Back in the present, someone tells Ryotaro to give up protecting time and searching for Yuto. He reveals a Rider Ticket and introduces himself as Yuto Sakurai.
19	"That Man, Zero's Start"; Transliteration: "Sono Otoko, Zero no Sutāto" (Japanese: その男、ゼロのスタート)	Kenzo Maihara	Yasuko Kobayashi	June 3, 2007
Ryotaro attempts to confront Yuto about his ties to the Sakurai he knew, only to be told that it was none of his business. Nonetheless, Ryotaro attempts to convince the Owner to let him enter the past. Meanwhile, a man named Kōhei Amano formed a contract with the Jelly Imagin to dig up a time capsule. Hana and Ryotaro both meet Yuto at Airi's shop, and an eventual confrontation between Momotaros and Deneb occurs, both possessing their respective hosts. However, Deneb simply presents a peace offering, and so Yuto expels him from his body. Surprisingly, Deneb is able to take a physical form, implying that Yuto has a full contract with Deneb. Elsewhere, the Jelly Imagin attempts to fulfill his contract by forcing his contractor to do the work instead. Ryotaro attempts to fight the Jelly Imagin, but it eventually manages to escape. He has another encounter with Yuto who tells him to stop interfering with time just to save people. As he reveals himself to be another Kamen Rider, he calls upon the ZeroLiner, leaving Ryotaro behind, once again confused.
20	"Let Me Say This to Start"; Transliteration: "Saisho ni Itteoku" (Japanese: 最初に言っておく)	Kenzo Maihara	Yasuko Kobayashi	June 10, 2007
Yuto makes his appearance on the DenLiner, and the Owner mentions that the ZeroLiner is another train that can travel through time and Sakurai may be its Kamen Rider, but he believes the ZeroLiner had been destroyed. Yuto once again tells Ryotaro not to bother going back in time, and then he leaves, only after Deneb has given the other passengers of the DenLiner some of his candies. Yuto goes off to find the Jelly Imagin's contractor, Kōhei Amano, to ask him about the contract, and he reveals that he is seeking for a time capsule that had been buried by his late girlfriend Haruka one year ago which holds her final memento to him. Amano also reveals that Ryotaro had been at the hospital before Yuto when the Jelly Imagin breaks the hospital room's window to take his contractor to the location of another time capsule. After Amano is forced to dig it up, the Jelly Imagin believes that his contract is completed, and he goes back in time to March 12, 2006, when the time capsule was first buried, with Ryotaro as Den-O in tow. When Den-O arrives, he finds Amano and Haruko passed out, and Ryotaro makes note of the tree's location. After a losing fight with the Jelly Imagin, Yuto arrives and transforms into Kamen Rider Zeronos. He fights the Jelly Imagin as Altair Form, and uses Deneb to slow the Jelly Imagin down until Deneb can no longer hold on. Yuto chastises his Imagin, and together they become Vega Form and destroy the Jelly Imagin. After that, Ryotaro tells Yuto that he saw the other Yuto Sakurai and that he will not stop looking for him, despite Yuto criticizing Ryotaro's imperfections. In the present, Ryotaro and Hana unearth Kōhei Amano's time capsule and return it to him.
21	"Fighting Style"; Transliteration: "Kenka no Ryūgi" (Japanese: ケンカのリュウ儀)	Hidenori Ishida	Yasuko Kobayashi	June 24, 2007
As Ryotaro saw the actual Yuto Sakurai in the past, he becomes suspicious of the one that is Zeronos. After telling the Owner of the battle in 2006, he states that he believes that Yuto may be the Sakurai Ryotaro knows, from 10 years in the past. Hana, herself, wishes to know more about how the ZeroLiner can exist when its timeline was destroyed, much like her own timeline was. Meanwhile, Sakurai injures his hand and goes into the Tokyo of 2007 and Deneb possesses him to assist a young man named Tanaka sell goods for the Tanabata Festival. After warning Deneb not to do things on his own, he leaves the Imagin to take care of things, by selling the items while in a tiger costume. In Tanaka's dream-like state, he opens a contract with the Tortoice Imagin to get even with his employer. At the Milk Dipper, Ozaki and Issē fight over putting tags on the Tanabata Tree while Airi serves coffee to Yuto, who introduces himself to her. On the DenLiner, Ryutaros has been drawing, and attacks anyone who steps on any of the drawings, one of which depicts Den-O Gun Form shooting Zeronos, to Urataros' dismay. When Kintaros gives Ryutaros the idea to show his strength to impress Airi, he possesses Ryotaro, who had been in the Milk Dipper with Hana, at the time. Once Yuto leaves, Ryutaros takes control and follows, cornering him with his dancers. As Ryutaros pursues Yuto, the Tortoice Imagin and its rabbit half attack Tanaka's employer to complete the contract. Hana tells Yuto to transform and that Ryotaro cannot control Ryutaros, but he reveals that the times he can transform into Zeronos is limited. He eventually gives in and fights Den-O Gun Form while Deneb runs to his partner's aid. Both Zeronos Altair Form and Den-O Gun Form are equally matched, as they rush at each other on their respective motorcycles.
22	"An Unspeakable Future"; Transliteration: "Hanasenai Mirai" (Japanese: ハナせない未来)	Hidenori Ishida	Yasuko Kobayashi	July 1, 2007
The fight between Den-O and Zeronos continues as they fire shot for shot, until Hana, once, again, tries to intervene. She ends up injured before Ryotaro was finally able to stop Ryutaros. Hana tries to confront Yuto about the ZeroLiner existing after her time was destroyed, but Yuto will only answer if Hana takes Deneb's place to help Tanaka, whom Hana and Ryotaro find injured after the Tortoice Imagin got mad at him for forgetting the wish. Hana sends Ryotaro to watch him as she keeps watch over the Tanabata despite being injured herself. Hana is unable to sell any candy due to her demeanor, but Naomi shows up along with Ryotaro to help her sell the Tanabata Sets while Kintaros and Urataros keep watch over the contract holder by keeping a nearly solid sand form within animal costumes while he is in the hospital with his irate boss. It is then that Tanaka remembers his wish, allowing the Tortoice Imagin to travel back in time. Urataros uses a Rider Ticket to record the past date and joins Ryotaro as he transforms into Den-O Rod Form, traveling back to November 29, 2006. Rod Form confronts the Imagin only to find that it can split and double team him. Zeronos arrives to even the odds, and the two Imagin halves are quickly defeated, only to reform into Gigandeaths Heaven and Hell. While the DenLiner Isurugi defeats Gigandeath Heaven, Gigandeath Hell attempts to retreat only to face the ZeroLiner and be destroyed. Back on the DenLiner, Yuto tells Hana that he knows nothing about the other timeline, nor has he ever met with the owner of the ZeroLiner. However, he does tell her that the ZeroLiner had disappeared, but it returned, giving her hope that her timeline may return as well.
23	"Enter the Prince, Kneel Down to Him!"; Transliteration: "Ōji Kōrin, Zu ga Takai!" (Japanese: 王子降臨、頭が高い！)	Ryuta Tasaki	Yasuko Kobayashi	July 8, 2007
On the DenLiner, the Owner mentions that some of the other passengers are complaining of animal sounds and food disappearing. When he suggests that the noise may be Kintaros' snoring, Kintaros awakes and says he does not snore, but he feels a strange sensation and finds a small puppy has peed on his foot. The DenLiner crew chase the puppy, and they are led to what is supposed to be an empty train car filled with puppies, kittens, and a Swan Imagin holding a human baby. Calling himself Sieg, the Imagin tells of how he came to form a contract to the baby, possessing Ryotaro with the Taros Imagin unable to get him out. Sieg reveals he intended to make a contract with a wealthy young woman half a year ago, but it turned out that she was pregnant and possessed her unborn child with no memory. When Sieg finally got his physical form, he had no memory of the contract's nature, and took his "brother" out of a truck when Ryutaros found him and brought him onto the DenLiner. Sieg, acting like a prince, orders the others to aid him in finding his "mother." When Momotaros refuses with intent to beat him, Sieg shrinks him, Urataros, and Kintaros to around four inches in height and leaves with Hana. Meanwhile, Akio Matsuda, who had kidnapped the baby, Yūsuke, opens a contract with the Scorpion Imagin to find the mother, while Yuto and Deneb watch from a distance. With some unexpected assistance from Ozaki, Hana discovers the location of the mother, Shiori, at which Yuto and Deneb have followed the Scorpion Imagin. They soon spot S-Ryotaro approaching the building as Sieg had remembered everything, and they are approached by the police who believe that he is the kidnapper. When the Scorpion Imagin attacks the Shiori, Sieg leaves, and Ryotaro goes to save the mother as Den-O, only for the Scorpion Imagin to escape after nearly killing them both. Ryotaro assures Shiori that Yūsuke is safe, and she passes out, just as the police arrive to take Ryotaro into custody.
24	"The Prince's Goodbye Lullaby"; Transliteration: "Gubbai Ōji no Rarabai" (Japanese: グッバイ王子のララバイ)	Ryuta Tasaki	Yasuko Kobayashi	July 15, 2007
After being arrested by the police, Ryotaro is questioned on his involvement with the kidnapping of baby Yūsuke Takayama. During the interrogation, Momotaros, Urataros, and Kintaros attempt to help him, as he has no knowledge of the event. On the DenLiner, Hana and Yuto try to understand what is going on, and Hana tries to talk some sense into Sieg about what he has done to Ryotaro. Hana tells him that a master has to take care of his servants, and with a slap, Sieg develops new respect for Hana and begins calling her Princess. Sieg manages to speak through Yūsuke to convince Shiori Takayama to acquit Ryotaro. Ryotaro is then brought to the Takayama mansion to be thanked, with Sieg possessing him with intent to live the good life forever. However, because he opened a contract with someone with very little memory like baby Yūsuke, Sieg begins to dissolve away. He goes to say goodbye to Yūsuke, but he is interrupted by the Scorpion Imagin's second attempt to bring Shiori to his contractor. Before Yuto can intervene, S-Ryotaro transforms into Kamen Rider Den-O Wing Form, managing to knock the Scorpion Imagin down. However, Sieg's dwindling strength allows the Scorpion to escape with Shiori. Sieg asks Ryotaro to save his mother, as he follows the Scorpion Imagin back in time to February 22, 2002, the day that Akio Masuda was fired by the Takayama family. Den-O fights the Scorpion Imagin as Rod Form and then Ax Form, and defeats him with a Dynamic Chop. Back on the DenLiner, Sieg continues to waste away until Ryotaro returns and shows the Owner a Rider Ticket bearing Sieg's image and the date June 1, 1997, that he got after using a Rider Ticket on Shiori. In reality, Sieg had already fulfilled a contract with the mother, before forging his contract with Yūsuke. Thanks to this, the DenLiner arrives on the day of Shiori's wedding, and Sieg leaves the DenLiner to live happily in the past.
25	"Climax Double Jump"; Transliteration: "Kuraimakkusu Daburu Janpu" (Japanese: クライマックスWジャンプ)	Kenzo Maihara	Yasuko Kobayashi	July 22, 2007
While Ryotaro sleeps, Deneb chases down a Compsognathus around his room until Yuto arrives through the window to take Ryotaro onto the ZeroLiner to see the Climax Scene, with Deneb taking him aboard. A sleepy Ryotaro then finds himself seeing a Pteranodon and several Brachiosaurus until Yuto uses an aerosol of sleeping gas to knock Ryotaro out, with him seeing Urataros as he enters his body. By the time he wakes up, Ryotaro believes what had happened was only dream, too drowsy to notice the dinosaur tracks on his wall. At the Milk Dipper, he tells Hana about the dream, and when she confronts Urataros, he knows nothing, and the others say that she should ask Yuto. Ryotaro helps Airi mind and decorate the Milk Dipper for a group of students, serving Yuto while asking him about his dream, that Yuto also knows nothing about. Miura arrives to tell Airi that he injured himself, and she leaves Ryotaro to mind the shop, and after a fight with Deneb, Yuto agrees to help by decorating with the various star-shaped balloons Airi had inflated. Deneb stands outside to watch, unaware of a second Deneb briefly chasing a group of ninjas. When Deneb notices a shuriken thrown into the door, Hana takes him away to question him and learns that he knows nothing. When a customer arrives, both Yuto and Ryotaro notice that the man is an Imagin's contract holder. They follow him to a local hospice while Hana and Naomi watch over the Milk Dipper along with Ozaki. When the Spider Imagin attacks, intent on granting his contract holder's wish for his sister to see a starry sky, Yuto is on his own as Ryotaro had been abducted by Deneb into the timestream. Deneb appears to take the Spider Imagin away from the room as Yuto is forced to fight himself, defeating the Spider Imagin easily in Zeronos Vega Form. As for Ryotaro, he finds himself on the ZeroLiner with another Yuto, who takes him to see the "Climax Scene", witnessing a battle between Zeronos and another Kamen Rider as well as the Tarōs fighting several ninjas until a giant train erupts from a cave.
26	"The Ticket to God's Line"; Transliteration: "Kami no Rosen e no Chiketto" (Japanese: 神の路線へのチケット)	Kenzo Maihara	Yasuko Kobayashi	July 29, 2007
After witnessing the Tarōs fighting several ninjas and seeing the GaohLiner in the Edo period, Ryotaro is once again subjected to sleeping gas before he can ask Yuto anything, with Kintaros possessing him this time. Back in the present, an irate Yuto is intent to find Ryotaro for ditching him when Deneb tells him that a second Spider Imagin is still on the loose. Yuto charges Deneb with the task of safeguarding the girl while he himself confronts the worrisome Hana and the Tarōs on the train about Ryotaro's disappearance, only for Ryotaro to appear with a katana and several other Edo artifacts on his person. He asks Yuto why he was taken to the past by Deneb, but Yuto says that that would be impossible and the Owner reveals that such time travel would be both possible and impossible. They both go back to the hospital to watch over the Imagin's contractor and his sister in case the Spider were to attack, again, and they discuss the issues behind Ryotaro's disappearance, with a second Yuto listening. The Spider Imagin blasts an electrical tower, causing a blackout for the whole city, and this allows Mayu Aoki to see the starry sky, completing the Spider Imagin's contract with her brother. Yuto has Ryotaro go back in time to stop the Imagin, and once Ryotaro leaves on the DenLiner, Yuto is confronted by another version of himself. In the past, the Spider Imagin begins destroying various buildings, until Den-O appears, and Ryutaros begins to fight as Gun Form. While the fight goes on, Zeronos fires a shot at the Spider, distracting it, and allowing for an annoyed Ryutaros to switch with Momotaros and allow for Sword Form to deal the final blow. Ryotaro returns to the present, where he and Yuto watch over the brother and sister in Kibōgahara. Then, Ryotaro is abducted by Deneb and the other Yuto, who interfered with Den-O's fight, to travel back in time, again. Once possessed by Ryutaros, Ryotaro and two past selves make their way to the Climax Scene: the battle to prevent the mysterious Gaoh from destroying all time and space.
27	"Schedule-Disrupting Fang"; Transliteration: "Daiya o Midasu Kiba" (Japanese: ダイヤを乱す牙)	Hidenori Ishida	Yasuko Kobayashi	August 5, 2007
Late on the night of August 2, 2007, two masked men sneak into the Milk Dipper, and try to pry up one of the floorboards while trying to silent. They are interrupted by a sleepwalking Ryotaro, and then by M-Ryotaro taking control and about to beat them up until Airi's coming in allowed the would-be thieves off to retreat, both unaware of being followed by the Molech Imagin and another Imagin yet to have physical form. The next day, Shōichi Ike, one of the burglars, is cornered by the Molech Imagin who had possessed his partner Hiroshi Katō, before being possessed by the Bloodsucker Imagin. While the two Imagin discuss their plan, Ryotaro, Airi, Yuto, Ozaki, Miura, Hana, along with Momotaros, Urataros, and Kintaros (in mascot costumes) have a stakeout at the Milk Dipper in case the burglars come back, having a sleepover. On the morning of August 4, Ike, once again, tries to enter the Milk Dipper, but he wakes Urataros who alerts everyone to the man's entry. The wide awake Hana and Yuto give chase while Urataros takes control of Ryotaro to help on the DenBird. When they catch Ike, he reveals that he was trying to retrieve a stash of jewels hidden in the Milk Dipper from a successful robbery in 2000, while his partner Katō is attempting to steal a rare necklace from Hope Jewelry with the Molech Imagin possessing him. U-Ryotaro and Hana go to deal with the Molech Imagin, while Yuto deals with Ike, realizing he too has a contract with an Imagin, as well. He chases Ike, running into the Bloodsucker Imagin who reveals that they planned to draw Ryotaro out. Yuto is forced to fight the Bloodsucker Imagin until the Molech Imagin succeeds in going back in time. Ryotaro pursues the Imagin to May 8, 2000, the day of the robbery where Katō is arrested. Den-O Sword Form destroys the Molech Imagin, though he delighted in the fact that he succeeded in his mission: distracting Den-O long enough for the DenLiner to be hijacked by his master, Gaoh. With these recent events, Yuto must go back in time to get reinforcements from past iterations of Ryotaro to fight Gaoh and prevent him from destroying all time.
28	"Too Lucky, Too Excited, Too Strange"; Transliteration: "Tsuki Sugi, Nori Sugi, Kawari Sugi" (Japanese: ツキすぎ、ノリすぎ、変わりすぎ)	Hidenori Ishida	Yasuko Kobayashi	August 12, 2007
After defeating Gaoh, the DenLiner gang celebrate their victory until Ryotaro remembers that Yuto mentioned he had been fighting an Imagin prior to their foray into the Edo period. Ryutaros, however, starts to get a sinking feeling as he and everyone notice that he, Urataros, and Kintaros are starting to dissolve. Ryotaro comes upon the Bloodsucker Imagin attacking people that have the stolen jewelry. Ryotaro assumes Ax Form, but he is unable to maintain it in the fight with Urataros attempting to jump in. Momotaros managed to get in and nearly defeats the Bloodsucker Imagin, until he is knocked into the water. Once Ryotaro returns to the DenLiner, the Owner reveals that Urataros, Kintaros, and Ryutaros are fading away due to the fact that Ryotaro only remembers the Climax Scene as Sword Form, thus why Momotaros is solely unaffected. Furthermore, there is no way to stop the deterioration like with Sieg. The three Tarōs seem to accept their fate, as a heart-broken Ryotaro runs off of the DenLiner. At the Milk Dipper, Yuto is being served coffee until a disguised Deneb reveals the situation to him. Hana tries to find Ryotaro, and succeeds, although he is trying to make his body stronger for the Imagin to save them. He remembers the good times he had with them, until he suddenly hears their final words in his mind as they disappeared. When he returns to the DenLiner, only Momotaros is left. Ryotaro begins trailing sand which the Owner states as the remains of Urataros and the others. Taking the Owner's advice, Ryotaro picks up some of the sand, reacting to his wish for all of them to be together and assuming the form of a cellphone, the K-Taros, as Ryotaro's way to stay in touch. Momotaros chalks it up to Ryotaro's lack of sense, to which a sadden Ryotaro simply agrees. Elsewhere, the Bloodsucker Imagin completed its contract and travels to May 20, 2000, attacking people until an upset Ryotaro arrives and begins to fight as Den-O Sword Form. However, the Bloodsucker Imagin is too strong for Sword Form to handle by himself. In the fight, Momotaros went berserk until the red cellphone starts ringing, and Urataros is on the other end. He tells Momotaros to put in the code "3-6-9-#", which makes the other Imagin speak from the phone before Den-O assumes Climax Form just as Yuto arrives. Den-O finishes off the Imagin with his Boistous Kick attack. Later the group celebrates the return of Urataros and the others until Hana punches Momotaros out of the DenLiner.
29	"Lucky Horror Show"; Transliteration: "Rakkī Horā Shō" (Japanese: ラッキー・ホラー・ショー)	Naoki Tamura	Yasuko Kobayashi	August 19, 2007
The Tarōs attempt to all possess Ryotaro at once, but it ended up with them controlling him in a mixed up fashion before getting out when Ryotaro was close to collapsing from the strain. Later, it is revealed that Airi is supporting a courage test at the new haunted attraction that has opened up in town, with the prize being having a spot of tea with her. Ryotaro sets up his own prize by allowing the Tarōs to take full control of his body for a whole day if they win, planning to perfect their teamwork in that fashion. While Ryotaro waits in line with Hana and a nervous Deneb, learning that the closed Fureaichou School happened to be where a murder was said to have occurred, a man named Machida is watching the people entering with an Imagin behind him. After Hana was disqualified for being easily scared by the first "zombie", whom she decked out, U-Ryotaro goes in and casually walks through the various "ghouls" until Momotaros takes over to speed it up. But once scared by a small chihuahua statuette, Kintaros takes over, only to open a door to a disqualifying room with Ryutaros upset that he does not have his turn. While the Tarōs argue over who is to blame, Machida enters the building as the Wasp Imagin attacks those who got to the classroom checkpoint. By the time Momotaros sensed the Imagin and Ryotaro gets to Machida, the contract is already complete and the Imagin travels back to December 5, 2005, when Machida committed manslaughter. Meanwhile, Deneb contacted Yuto about the Wasp Imagin, but during his call panics over a frightening part of the exhibit. Deneb's silence after the call forced Yuto to waste one of his two last cards, only to find Deneb alright. Ryotaro goes back in to fight the Wasp Imagin in Plat Form, convincing the Tarōs to go Climax Form. Though the quartet are unable to at first, it was their need to help Ryotaro that allowed them to achieve Climax Form and destroy the Wasp Imagin with Boistous Punch. Back the present, it turns out the "victim" was the neighborhood chairman, who staged the attraction to drive Machida out. With only one Zeronos card left, Yuto is upset and Deneb blames himself for the situation, leaving Yuto in shame.
30	"Madam, How About the Fireworks?"; Transliteration: "Okusan Hanabi Dō?" (Japanese: 奥さん花火どう？)	Naoki Tamura	Yasuko Kobayashi	August 26, 2007
The DenLiner gang gets ready for the big fireworks show when Yuto comes aboard to find Deneb, but Hana tells him that he is not there. At the Milk Dipper, Ryotaro and Airi have had a fight last night when the MilkDipper got quarantined, and the two not on speaking terms since. Ryotaro leaves, only to crash into Deneb, who wishes to open a contract with him. Deneb reveals to Ryotaro that he cannot face Yuto after having him use up his second to last card, seeing that helping Ryotaro to ensure Yuto does not use the card. But Momotaros senses presence of the Bluebird Imagin, who had just forged a contract with a pyrotechnician named Tōru Terasaki. Once they do find the Imagin, Deneb reluctantly interferes too much with the battle, and the Bluebird escapes in the process. Later, Ryotaro goes to find Tōru in the hospital who reveals his wish for his divorced wife and son Ryu to see fireworks after five years. Ryotaro also tries to talk some sense into Deneb, convincing him to go and apologize to Yuto. When the Bluebird Imagin attacks Tōru's wife by showing her his "fireworks" to complete the contract, he steals Tōru to travels into the past. Den-O Sword Form pursues the Imagin, fighting him before assuming Climax Form, and using his Boistous Shout to destroy the Bluebird Imagin. Back in the present time, Deneb finds Yuto and begs for forgiveness. But Yuto saying that the card is not what is truly important to him, throws the last card into a nearby river, bringing Deneb to tears. Later, Terasaki is able to work his first fireworks presentation, and finds his wife and Ryu behind him, enjoying the show. Likewise, Airi and Ryotaro make peace and watch the fireworks with Ozaki, Miura, and Hana, while the Tarōs watch on the train (with Momotaros trying to be the quiet one for once and ending up with a faceful of scalding coffee). As for Yuto and Deneb, they search for the discarded Zeronos Card in the pond... which ends up in a wrestling match as their friendship is once again intact.
31	"Ai Need Yu"; Transliteration: "Ai Nīdo Yū" (Japanese: 愛(アイ)・ニード・侑(ユウ))	Osamu Kaneda	Yasuko Kobayashi	September 2, 2007
After destroying the Rabbit Imagin, Ryotaro attempted to ask Yuto of his card, only for Yuto to leave. When Ryotaro returns to the Milk Dipper, he finds several items in the process of being repossessed by a bank to which Airi has a ten million-yen debt due to the one who set it up. When the men sent to label things for repossession are about to tag Sakurai's telescope, Ryotaro tries to take it away, chased by the men until their superior arrives and intervenes. By the time they got back, Airi realizes that this is Fujishiro, who she had known when she was younger and he is also the owner of the company that she is indebted to. Fujishiro offers Airi a way to get rid of her massive debt: becoming his wife. Fujishiro leaves so Airi can decide, to which Airi follows to settle things. Miura and Ozaki are angered that Airi may accept the man's offer, as is Ryutaros, who nearly possesses Ryotaro before he is talked out of it on the promise of calling him. When Yuto arrives to see the state of the Milk Dipper, he and Ryotaro talk about the debt, with Ryotaro worried that Fujishiro might remind Airi of the Sakurai they knew, to which Yuto is indifferent. When Momotaros senses that the Anthopper Imagin's presence, Ryotaro gives chase with Ryutaros's aid, leaving Yuto behind so he can get Airi. Yuto sends Deneb after Den-O just in case due to the Imagin showing himself like that. As Gun Form fights the Anthopper Imagin Ari, Airi speaks to Fujishiro, turning down his offer, to which he is enraged and realizes that Airi must still have feelings for Sakurai. As Airi cannot remember, Fujishiro tells her everything about the past with Sakurai, as Yuto tries to get to the building before any damage can be done. Gun Form, however, is ambushed by the younger Anthopper Imagin Kirigiris and ends up overwhelmed by the twin brother Imagin due to his own pride.
32	"Last Train Card Zero!"; Transliteration: "Shūden Cādo Zero!" (Japanese: 終電カード・ゼロ！)	Osamu Kaneda	Yasuko Kobayashi	September 9, 2007
Due to Ryutaros's stubborn pride, Den-O Gun Form is defeated by the Anthopper Brothers. But before the two Imagin deal the deathblow, Deneb runs in and fires wildly at the two as he grabs Den-O and escapes on the DenLiner. With Ryotaro gravely injured, he is sent to the hospital to heal up while Momotaros and gang swear to avenge him and the equally hurt Ryutaros. While it all occurred, Yuto fights his way into Fujishiro's office, and when Airi mentions that his last name, Fujishiro is confused and thinks that he is just the brother of the Sakurai he knows. Later, an irate Fujishiro is about to leave when he is approached by Ari, forcefully possessed by him under the Imagin's promise to fulfill his wish to have Airi. The next day, a possessed Fujishiro goes to the Milk Dipper and he kidnaps Airi. Learning of this, Yuto decides to handle this without Ryotaro's help and D-Yuto confronts A-Fujishiro. During the fight, Deneb leaves Yuto's body to fend the possessed Fujiroshiro off. But while Yuto attempts to find Airi, he is halted by Kirigiris. But M-Ryotaro arrives and takes on Kirigiris as Den-O Sword Form to settle things. By the time Yuto finds her, Airi begins to remember more about the past, and realizes Yuto is her beloved Sakurai. Before they can talk, Yuto leaves to aid Den-O against the Anthoppers, using up his final Zeronos Card to fight Ari. Den-O takes Kirigiris outside to fight, assuming Climax Form once Ryutaros is fully healed. Once the Anthoppers are destroyed, Yuto removes the card, and suddenly, both Airi and Fujishiro forget about Yuto Sakurai.
33	"Time Traveler Kohana"; Transliteration: "Taimu Toraburā Kohana" (Japanese: タイムトラブラー・コハナ)	Takao Nagaishi	Yasuko Kobayashi	September 16, 2007
Ryotaro calls Yuka while she is back at the university in England, and the subject of her previous visit to Japan comes up. When Ryotaro asks her about Sakurai, she cannot remember anything. On the DenLiner, the Tarōs and Naomi see a twisted and damaged track, and the Owner reveals that a new line is being opened with a change about to occur. Just then, Momotaros realizes that Hana is not there when he and others were checking themselves for changes. Elsewhere, Hana finds herself turned into a young child. The next day, Ryotaro receives a call from Hana and goes to meet her, astonished by her current form. When he brings her to the Milk Dipper, and Airi asks who she is, Ryotaro quickly comes up with the name "Kohana" and that Kohana is Hana's younger sister. In town, a tuxedo-wearing man, visiting various places with pianos, sits down at them and starts playing a song. While playing at a restaurant, he opens a contract with the Kraken Imagin. Yuto notices the contracting and goes to get Ryotaro while Deneb watches over the contract holder. The Imagin attacks a young girl practicing piano and steals the piano as Yuto finds Ryotaro and discovers Hana's current state. Ryotaro goes to find Deneb while Yuto takes Hana on the DenLiner. Deneb follows the man to a hospice where the Kraken Imagin gives its contract holder the stolen piano. The Imagin thinks that the contract is complete by granting the man's wish for the piano, but the contractor disagrees. The Imagin proceeds to attack the Piano Man, but Deneb intervenes by using his Nova abilities and gets the mysterious pianist away from the Kraken Imagin until Den-O Sword Form arrives. The fight ends in a draw due to Den-O Sword Form's stalling because Momotaros doesn't know which final attack he should use and the Imagin escapes. When Ryotaro and Deneb try to find the contractor, he is playing the piano the Imagin brought him. Back on the DenLiner, the Owner shows Yuto and Hana the twisted set of tracks, which he speculates to represent the original time period of both the ZeroLiner and Hana herself.
34	"The Time Interval Pianist"; Transliteration: "Toki no Hazama no Pianisuto" (Japanese: 時の間(はざま)のピアニスト)	Takao Nagaishi	Yasuko Kobayashi	September 23, 2007
The Kraken Imagin escapes without Ryotaro and Deneb figuring anything out about the Piano Man and his wish. Ryotaro and Yuto follow him to the hospice, where a young man named Okamura has been in a coma for over three years. When D-Yuto and U-Ryotaro go to his room, they learn of what happened, seeing the Piano Man staring at the same room, idly playing a piano in his mind until a police officer takes him away. Before Urataros can woo the nurse, Kohana arrives to take both him and D-Yuto away. U-Ryotaro and Kohana follow the Piano Man, learning that he is not remembered by anyone else. Ryotaro finds Yuto watching the Piano Man, revealing what he learned is similar to Sakurai. When the Kraken Imagin arrives with another stolen piano for his contract, Ryotaro transforms into Den-O Rod Form and fights until Piano Man's playing for Okamura completed the contract. The Kraken Imagin proceeds to travel to January 18, 2004, the day the Piano Man and Okamura first met, with Okamura's intent to becoming a pro before he ended up in his coma. Rod-Form pursues the Kraken Imagin, defeating him as the Imagin then reforms into several Gigandeath Heavens and Hells, which destroy nearly everything in the timeline. Using all of the time trains, an infuriated Den-O defeats the monsters, bringing everything back to normal, except for the Piano Man, as he has no place in the memories of others. When Ryotaro laments about this on the DenLiner, the Piano Man comes aboard with a Rider Ticket from January 18, 2004, as he is revealed to be a time wanderer until he is remembered by Okamura.
35	"Tragic Resurrection Card Zero"; Transliteration: "Higeki no Fukkatsu Kādo Zero" (Japanese: 悲劇の復活カード・ゼロ)	Kenzo Maihara	Yasuko Kobayashi	September 30, 2007
Ryotaro starts a special training program under Kohana's guidance with Kintaros to become stronger. Kohana had tried previously with both Momotaros and Urataros, but due to Momotaros' love for fighting and Urataros' flirting, she grounds the both of them on the DenLiner, away from Ryotaro. Kintaros decides to take Ryotaro to Okamoto Dojo, where he had previously defeated all the students and master while possessing Masaru Honjō. He then gets out of Ryotaro's body, leaving Ryotaro to attempt to fend for himself. K-Ryotaro escapes from the dojo, taking Kohana with him. Kintaros later ponders why Ryotaro would want to become stronger, feeling that Ryotaro's already strong enough as is, though he is still convinced he needs to be stronger. Elsewhere, on the ZeroLiner, Deneb finished his research on the new line as he and Yuto get a surprise visit by Sakurai, who offers Yuto a new Zeronos card and a full card holder along with it. Deneb, not wanting Yuto to suffer being forgotten again, takes Sakurai out of the ZeroLiner. Meanwhile, the Mole Imagin completes a contract with a man named Yamaguchi, who wanted revenge on the Okamoto Dojo for losing a singing contest. K-Ryotaro heads to November 22, 2006 as Den-O Ax Form to take on the Axe Hand Mole Imagin, but when he arrives, he is ambushed by the Imagin's two "brothers", the Claw Hand and Drill Hand Mole Imagin, sealing the trap to eliminate Den-O. While fighting the Mole Imagin and his two clones, Ax-Form begins to act strangely and is unable to fight effectively. Den-O is eventually overwhelmed, and the Axe Hand Mole Imagin decides to personally finish the job, having his brothers leave. But Yuto arrives in the nick of time, taking his future self's offer and once more becoming Kamen Rider Zeronos, causing his future self to vanish from that point in time. Zeronos Altair Form easily defeats the Mole Imagin before he can make his escape. Ryotaro questions Yuto as to what just happened, but Yuto walks off without an answer.
36	"No Possession, No Secession, Train Slash!"; Transliteration: "Tsukazu, Hanarezu, Densha Giri!" (Japanese: 憑かず、離れず、電車斬り！)	Kenzo Maihara	Yasuko Kobayashi	October 7, 2007
Ryotaro confronts Yuto about his contract with Deneb and his future self, learning that Sakurai is the one who supplies Yuto with the Zeronos arsenal for the purpose of protecting the future at the cost of being erased from others' memories, resulting with Yuto displaced from time and space. Refusing to let this happen, Ryotaro takes the cards and runs off, confronting Airi about her lack of memory of the telescope and the railwatch. On the DenLiner, the Owner reveals that Kintaros' out of synch may be tied to the new railway forming. While Ryutaros and Naomi prepare for a party, Momotaros, Urataros, and Kintaros talk of their future not coinciding with Ryotaro's anymore. When Yuto finally catches up to Ryotaro and as the two start to question their actions, the remaining two Mole Imagin brothers begin to lure Den-O back in the past, destroying everything around them. It was then that Ryotaro accepts Yuto's decision to take the cards again, regardless of the consequences. They both transform and return to November 22, 2006 to confront the Mole Imagin brothers. In the middle of the battle, Momotaros loses his synch with Den-O, with the Mole Imagin brothers double teaming Den-O Plat Form after taking out Zeronos Vega Form. But at the last second, the Tarōs arrive with the DenKamen Sword, so that Ryotaro can use their powers without being possessed. With it, Den-O transforms into Liner Form and Ryotaro, by himself, destroys the two Mole Imagin. However, during the resulting party on the DenLiner, Ryotaro notices the Owner being silent as he was staring out the window at the new line, with a time-train waiting inside.
37	"I Have the Face for It, Don't I?"; Transliteration: "Ore, Sōiu Kao Shiteru daro?" (Japanese: 俺、そういう顔してるだろ？)	Ryuta Tasaki	Yasuko Kobayashi	October 14, 2007
While training with Momotaros, Ryotaro starts to question the strange things occurring since the new line started forming, with the Imagin being evasive on the subject. On the DenLiner, Ryutaros is troubled as he receives a psychic message from the one who assigned him to kill Ryotaro, refusing to carry out the task. The very figure, Kai decides to handle things himself with the aid of the Leo Imagin and his Leo Soldiers. The next day, Ryutaros presents the gang a drawing of Airi, wanting to give it to her. But Momotaros' words annoy Ryutaros and Ryotaro takes him out before a fight starts. At the Milk Dipper, R-Ryotaro arrives as he sees Airi with Yuto, running off in a fit. R-Ryotaro attempts to dance to forget about Yuto and calm down, until Kai arrives and out does him in a dance-off. Once realizing who he is, Ryutaros assumes Den-O Gun Form, the Leo Imagin protects his master as Kai offers a new deal: A contract with Yuto so he can have Airi. Soon after, the DenLiner arrives to the Time Station, the others looking around and meeting the Station Master as the ZeroLiner also arrives. While the others with looking around, R-Ryotaro messes with the ZeroLiner's systems using the Rider Pass. But while Yuto chases down R-Ryotaro, the ZeroLiner connects to the DenLiner and both trains leave the station. Momotaros and the others attempt to get to their train, but the Leo Soldiers intercept them and the three Imagin are forced to fight them. Meanwhile, R-Ryotaro arrives back in the present, with the Leo Imagin revealing that Kai had no intentions on completing the deal as it was to get rid of the DenLiner and Den-O's Rider Pass. Yuto arrives in time as he battles the Leo Imagin, with Kai telling Ryutaros that he has no more need for him and intends to destroy him.
38	"The King Train Within the Train Terminal"; Transliteration: "Densha no Naka no Denshaō" (Japanese: 電車の中の電車王)	Ryuta Tasaki	Yasuko Kobayashi	October 21, 2007
As Yuto battles the Leo Imagin, Kai probes Ryutaros to learn of Airi as the reason of his betrayal. Pointing out how things will not work out between him and Airi, Ryutaros tries to sic his dancers on Kai, only for them to turn against him. R-Ryotaro attempts to fight, but Kai has no interest in fighting Ryotaro and R-Ryotaro runs off with the dancers in pursuit. The Leo Imagin was soon forced to leave the fight, allowing Yuto to chase after R-Ryotaro. In the Time Terminal, the other Tarōs defeat the Leo Soldiers and are updated by Kohana of the chaos. As the DenLiner and the ZeroLiner are on a rampage with Deneb and Naomi holding on for dear life, the Owner and the Station Master enter a contest and explain the nature of the junction point. But when the need for a solution to the crisis is brought up, both men reveal the station, the KingLiner, is the answer. Upon pinpointing their location, KingLiner mobilizes and saves the two trains in time. At the same time, R-Ryotaro arrives to Milk Dipper to see Airi, only to be hurt that she quickly realizes that he is not the Ryotaro she knows. R-Ryotaro runs off crying as Yuto finds him. But Kai and the Leo Imagin find them as well as Ryotaro takes over and stands up to him for Ryutaros' sake. The Leo Imagin decides to silence him when the DenLiner arrives with Ryotaro's Rider Pass. Ryotaro quickly assumes Den-O Sword Form to settle things here and now. But a bored Kai has other plans and turns himself into a time gate for the Leo Imagin to enter. Ignoring Kai, Sword Form arrives to January 19, 2006 to fight the Leo Imagin, but is forced out and Den-O assumes Liner Form to defeat the Imagin with Ryutaros' power. Though things seemed to be back to normal, Ryutaros is heart-broken about Airi as Kai begins his new plan.
39	"The Rider Disappears as Well"; Transliteration: "Soshite Raidā mo Inakunaru" (Japanese: そしてライダーもいなくなる)	Naoki Tamura	Yasuko Kobayashi	October 28, 2007
After Den-O Sword Form destroy the Panda Rabbit Imagin as he just completed the contract, Ryotaro uses the card from the contact holder to go the time the Imagin was to terrorize. Once at September 13, 2006, Ryotaro and Kohana find Sakurai wandering there, adding to the mystery behind Kai. Meanwhile, Kai decides to express his anger towards Ryotaro with the female Snail Imagin aiding him. The next day, Ryotaro crashes into Yuto after he and Deneb went grocery shopping. After Yuto leaves him while they were discussing Airi's memory, Kai appears and engages Ryotaro in a talk about the morals of time alterations before Momotaros takes over and the Tarōs state their disgust for Kai. Annoyed with the "traitors", Kai sends the female Snail Imagin back in time to March 27, 1993, before Yuto acquired the Zeronos arsenal. Ryotaro and Yuto arrive only to see the Imagin kill the younger Yuto by destroying the field trip van. As a result, Yuto fades away before Ryotaro's eyes. Though she gloats, Ryotaro transforms to Liner Form and destroys the female Snail Imagin. Though Ryotaro expected Yuto to reappear as everything she obliterated was restored, only to realize he has no memory of Yuto at that time and the Zeronos Cards ensure no one at that time remembers Yuto, either. When Ryotaro returns to the present, he finds the Milk Dipper completely changed as in this time line, Airi and Sakurai had never met.
40	"Change Imagin World"; Transliteration: "Chenji Imajin Wārudo" (Japanese: チェンジ・イマジン・ワールド)	Naoki Tamura	Yasuko Kobayashi	November 11, 2007
Succeeding in his machinations, Kai erases Yuto from the future time line, causing the Milk Dipper to become a girls' hang out with Sakurai gone as well. Furthermore, as only Kohana and the Owner remember Yuto, too, Deneb is now contracted to Ryotaro and part of the DenLiner crew. Later, while Ryotaro and Kohana ponder the Owner's words about memory's effects on people and the nature of Singularity Points, the girl gets taken by the male Snail Imagin. Ax Form attempts to fight until Kai reveals himself with the Gecko and Newt Imagin as backup. Kai reveals to Ryotaro that Sakurai is the true target of the Imagin, with his removal from existence allowing the future Kai came from to be realized. Though Ryotaro understood that Yuto's absence had a positive effect on the present, he could not accept it if it meant that Yuto sacrificed himself in vain. Meeting Kai again, Ryotaro tells him that he figured the future is not truly decided, causing everything to return to normal. Annoyed, Kai summons his Imagin to kill Ryotaro and Kohana. But Yuto arrived at the last second, having created new memories in the present through his actions as Zeronos. Seeing no chance, Kai sent the male Snail Imagin back into time while having the other two Imagin remain to fight. While Zeronos goes back in time after the Snail Imagin, Den-O deals with the two Imagin before assuming Climax Form to defeat them. On February 1, 1999, the Snail Imagin attempts to kill Sakurai when Zeronos arrives to fight. At the last second, Zeronos uses the unusual card with a red Z that he received from his future self to assume Zero Form. Though he destroyed the Snail Imagin, Yuto loses a portion of his own memories related to Airi, who also forgot about meeting the younger Yuto as well.
41	"Candy Scandal"; Transliteration: "Kyandi Sukyandaru" (Japanese: キャンディ・スキャンダル)	Hidenori Ishida	Yasuko Kobayashi	November 18, 2007
While having Ryotaro help her go shopping, Airi's purse is stolen. Yuto stops the mugger in a spectacle, with Ryotaro shocked to hear that Yuto and Airi appear to be meeting for the first time. He follows Yuto to learn that the red Zeronos cards erase people's memories of Yuto himself and though his negation is the same as Kai's goal, Yuto justifies it to ensure the future. Meanwhile, Kai finds an ideal pawn in a girl named Shōko sending an Imagin to form a contract with her. That night, Deneb attempts to ensure Yuto will be remembered by possessing him when he is asleep. From there, D-Yuto begins to deliver his candy throughout the city at night to make friends until he finds Shōko sleeping on a park bench. D-Yuto's profound act of kindness by giving his coat to her results in Shōko falling in love with Yuto, giving the Oct Imagin a desire to work with. Meanwhile, while practicing to counter, the Owner tells Ryotaro that the Station Master will arrive and may reveal the truth behind Sakurai. The next day, Shōko arrives to await Yuto at the park as D-Yuto promised. However, Yuto learns of Deneb's deeds and is about to beat answers out of him when the Oct Imagin abducts him. Deneb attempts to save Yuto, but is hesitant when the Imagin uses Yuto as a shield. But Den-O Sword Form arrives and fights the Imagin, who turns the DenBird against him, which keeps Den-O from landing the deathblow before his bike bursts into flames. While Ryotaro and Yuto are perplexed by the Imagin's contract, with Deneb knowing why, Shōko is saddened by Yuto not coming.
42	"Memory Update"; Transliteration: "Omoide Appudēto" (Japanese: 想い出アップデート)	Hidenori Ishida	Yasuko Kobayashi	November 25, 2007
The Oct Imagin's attack leaves Yuto unconscious and Shōko heartbroken about not meeting Yuto, who is wounded in the fight. Deneb reveals that he is the reason for the Oct Imagin attacking Yuto, who regains conscious and has to be restrained by the DenLiner gang to keep him from killing Deneb for risking innocents in spite of his intentions. Deneb takes Ryotaro to the park to find Shōko, though Deneb asks if Urataros can handle it as a favor. With that, U-Ryotaro resolves the matter, though she preferred to return the coat to Yuto personally. Meanwhile, Kai psychically tells the Oct Imagin to complete his contract first before killing Yuto. The next day, D-Yuto retrieves the coat, but soon spends time with Shōko at the city zoo with Ryotaro following them until the Oct Imagin resumes his attack. Den-O Rod Form attempts to take out the Imagin until a severed tentacle possesses a nearby truck and attempts to run him over. The Oct Imagin manages to make his way to Yuto and Shōko, forcing Yuto to assume Zeronos Zero Form to travel to November 15, 2006. Once there, Zero Form manages to keep the Imagin from killing Sakurai. Zeronos holds his own until a tentacle possesses the ZeroGasher and attacks him. The Imagin then attempts to choke out Zeronos until Den-O Liner Form arrives and the two combine their attacks to destroy the Oct Imagin. However, a piece of the Oct Imagin's tentacle enters AuraLiner, bringing it life as it enters the time-railway and becomes a hydra monster. Both the DenLiner and the ZeroLiner are overwhelmed by it until the KingLiner arrives and all the trains combine their firepower to destroy it. Though Shōko loses her memory of Yuto, Ryotaro assures him that Airi will remember him based on what Owner told him. By the time Ryotaro returns to the DenLiner, he meets the Station Master who gives him something very important to provide explanations behind the Junction Point.
43	"Something Missing"; Transliteration: "Samushingu Misshingu" (Japanese: サムシング・ミッシング)	Takayuki Shibasaki	Yasuko Kobayashi	December 2, 2007
After giving Owner his Gold Spoon collection, which everyone thought would answer their questions, the Station Master reveals he doubts that Sakurai is the key to the Junction Point. In the present, Ryotaro and Kohana ponder Owner's words that something is amiss in the Sakurai mystery and Ryotaro's memories may not be as true as everyone thought. However, while training Ryotaro, Momotaros senses the Armadillo Imagin as he fulfilled his contract. By the time M-Ryotaro arrives, the Imagin retreats into June 25, 2005. M-Ryotaro was about to chase after the Armadillo Imagin when Kai and the Albinoleo Imagin arrive. Kai then reveals the result of Den-O's impact is erasing all Imagin by giving Ryotaro an ominous revelation: the "day he and the Tarōs will part ways" draws near. Horrified and confused by this, Ryotaro demanded an explanation from the Tarōs, with Momotaros changing the subject with the current crisis. Ryotaro arrives to confront the Armadillo Imagin, but refuses to use the DenKamen Sword and attempt to restrain the Imagin. Zeronos Zero Form attempts to aid Ryotaro, but Ryotaro's reluctance to kill places both Riders at a disadvantage until the DenLiner saved them. However, the incident drives a wedge between a disgusted Momotaros and a vexed Ryotaro, who decides to end his contract with the Tarōs, wishing them to leave him alone. But as the Armadillo Imagin stowed on the DenLiner, Kai questions why Yuto protected Ryotaro instead of Sakurai.
44	"Resolution of a Single-Action"; Transliteration: "Ketsui no Shinguru Akushon" (Japanese: 決意のシングルアクション)	Takayuki Shibasaki	Yasuko Kobayashi	December 9, 2007
After learning the horrible truth behind his losing sync with the Tarōs, Ryotaro wants nothing more to do with them anymore. The other Tarōs have to restrain an enraged Momotaros while Ryutaros is speechless. Once at the Time Station, Urataros and Kintaros take Momotaros to calm him down as he leaves, still hurt about Ryotaro's choice. While Yuto helps Ryutaros in understanding Ryotaro's position, Hana goes back to the present to get advice from Airi on her feelings for the Taros. Back at the Time Station, Urataros and Kintaros see the Armadillo Imagin as he's about to attack, holding him off as Ryutaros arrives to back them up. Ryotaro is on his way when Momotaros halts him, forcing Ryotaro to fight him to prove he has what it takes to fight on his own. But Ryotaro admits that he is afraid of losing the Tarōs, but knows he must fight to protect time. Understanding Ryotaro now, Momotaros apologizes for not being honest about the recent events, revealing that he wants to protect the present as well along with the other Tarōs. With that, the two hurry to the others' aid, with the Den-O team back together. Going through each default form, Den-O overwhelms the Armadillo Imagin until assuming Climax Form to finish the fight. Soon after, on the DenLiner, Naomi set up a meal Kohana made to celebrate the Tarōs staying with the team as Owner to Ryotaro reveals the final battle is about to begin. Back in the present, Kai is fixated on why Yuto saved Ryotaro instead of Sakurai, realizing that there's something else he had forgot and Ryotaro is somehow tied to it.
45	"Reliving a Blank Day"; Transliteration: "Yomigaeru Kūhaku no Ichinichi" (Japanese: 甦る空白の一日)	Kenzo Maihara	Yasuko Kobayashi	December 16, 2007
While getting the Milk Dipper ready for Christmas, Ryotaro receives a package holding a pocket watch, identical to the one Sakurai gave to Airi. Learning that the watch was sent to him by himself, with no recollection of the act, Ryotaro heads to the clock shop he and Airi went to last year for Sakurai's watch to get to the bottom of it. Learning that last year he ordered the watch for August, Ryotaro is even more confused and remembers Owner's words about his memory before going to find Yuto to take him to the day Airi lost her memory. But as Yuto refuses to help Ryotaro, hiding something from him, the clock shop owner inadvertently opens a contract with the Snowman Imagin. Once learning of the Snowman Imagin, Den-O Sword Form intercepts the Imagin and is unable to keep it from going back in time as he attempted not to destroy the Santa balloon in the vicinity. But in spite of Yuto's pleas not to, Ryotaro goes back in time to January 10, 2007, the day Sakurai disappeared and Airi lost her memory, to learn what truly happened. Once assuming Liner Form, Den-O destroys the Snowman Imagin and then Ryotaro heads to the lake where Sakurai disappeared. When he arrives, he sees Sakurai, as Zeronos Altair Form, fighting off a trio of Leo Soldiers before Kai opens a time pulse with the ZeroLiner covering Ryotaro and Yuto. In the midst of the explosion, Ryotaro sees Airi before she and Sakurai fade out of existence with the rest of the area. Only Ryotaro and Yuto remain, watching a jubilant Kai celebrating his victory on the desert wasteland.
46	"Now to Reveal Love and Truth"; Transliteration: "Ima Akasu Ai to Kotowari" (Japanese: 今明かす愛と理(ことわり))	Kenzo Maihara	Yasuko Kobayashi	December 23, 2007
After seeing a horrific moment in time in his attempt to learn the truth, Ryotaro becomes confused and becomes upset about Airi until Yuto restrains him, revealing that this is the past and brings Ryotaro back to the DenLiner to reflect on how his memory saved Airi and Sakurai and restored the present. Meanwhile, as Kai needs to find Ryotaro before his condition gets worst, Deneb tells Yuto how he made his contract with Sakurai and his intend to fight for Yuto to the very end. But even at the Christmas party at the Milk Dipper, Ryotaro is still bothered by the information he amassed. The next day, Ryotaro is encountered by Kai who uses Ryotaro's memory to cover the truth. By the time Yuto arrives, Kai sends the Albinoleo Imagin to January 10, 2007 so he can kill their true target: Airi. Though the Riders use the KingLiner to intercept the Imagin, they are unable to defeat him in Liner and Zero Forms. But at the last second, Sakurai himself arrives and assumes Zeronos Altair Form and the three Riders succeed in killing the Imagin together. Once the battle is over, Sakurai takes his leave without answering Ryotaro. Back on the DenLiner, the Airi from the past arrives and reveals to know about Sakurai becoming Zeronos and Den-O's mission, apologizing to Yuto and Ryotaro for causing them to suffer by protecting her. In spite of Ryotaro's pleas, the Airi of the past leaves the DenLiner to resume her place in history, but not before Yuto gives her a white flower which she brings with her on the day she apparently died by Kai's hand and lost her memory of Sakurai. But though he finally understands what truly happened that day, Ryotaro feels even more uneasy about his missing memory and Airi's words of a hope from the future. Meanwhile, knowing his true target, Kai takes in every contract-less Imagin, forming a massive army to succeed in destroying Airi.
47	"You Wept Over My End"; Transliteration: "Ore no Saigo ni Omae ga Naita" (Japanese: 俺の最期にお前が泣いた)	Takao Nagaishi	Yasuko Kobayashi	January 6, 2008
While celebrating New Years with the Tarōs and everyone on the DenLiner as it docks into the KingLiner, Owner leaves to have his "final battle" with the Station Master before Den-O's own can begin. Urataros is bothered by the revelation as Kintaros eases the situation before asking Ryotaro to reveal his new year's resolution: for Kintaros and the others to stay with him. Later, Ryotaro visits a shrine with Airi to make his wish, seeing Yuto there as well. Meanwhile, after reminding his Imagin who's in charge when they demand him to send them into the past, Kai begins his attempt to erase Airi by sending his massive Imagin army raging in the past while providing the timedate June 16, 2000 to Ryotaro. While Yuto remains to protect Airi, Den-O Liner Form goes back into time to take on the massive Imagin army. But Den-O learns too late that it was a trap, with Zeronos holding his own against the Imagin still in the present. Den-O was unable to hold them all off until Kintaros arrives and takes the Den-O Belt. Giving Ryotaro a model of Kintarō and other items that represent the other Tarōs, Kintaros uses Ryotaro's resolution to complete his contract with him though it meant he can't return to the DenLiner. Once he assumes Den-O Ax Form to take out some of the Imagin while telling Ryotaro of his resolve to put the future's safety ahead of himself, Kintaros holds the remainder off to give Ryotaro time to escape back to the present to save Airi as Kai probes her to see why she is his true target before killing her.
48	"Opposite Goodbyes..."; Transliteration: "Urahara na Wakare..." (Japanese: ウラ腹な別れ・・・)	Takao Nagaishi	Yasuko Kobayashi	January 13, 2008
After the Imagin fall back, Yuto and Deneb find Airi unconscious and take her to the hospital. Kai is horribly confused by Airi being both the Junction Point and not, causing his condition to worsen as the Death Imagin is created from his being. With Kintaros gone, the DenLiner's crew goes silent as Ryotaro learns that the Tarōs are beginning to fade, with Momotaros's intent to continue fighting Kai anyway an inspiration. But while pondering his fate, Urataros finds a trio of New Mole Imagin that stowed on the DenLiner and rigged the Machine DenBird to explode. But rather than fight them, Urataros helps them in derailing the time train before dropping the DenLiner crew off on January 9, 2007, as he revealed to have planned from the very beginning. While the gang feel betrayed by Urataros's treachery, Ryotaro refused to accept it after all they went through together, calming everyone down while revealing that Urataros placed them one day before January 10th. Ryotaro finds his past self, learning that Airi had a baby with Sakurai. Assuming his past self's clothes to see his sister, Ryotaro learns of the truth that his actions as Den-O were arranged and that his missing memory was caused by Sakurai, restoring the time Kai destroyed but in order to hide the baby, a Singularity Point, from the Imagin to protect the future. Meanwhile, as Ryotaro realizes the identity of the Airi's child, Urataros and the New Mole Imagin trio arrive to take the Rider Pass, with a final confrontation between Momotaros and Urataros until the DenLiner arrives, which the evil Imagin intend to detonate as planned. But at the last second, Urataros reveals he disarmed the bomb and faked his betrayal as he becomes Den-O Rod Form to destroy one of the New Mole Imagin. But as the DenLiner begins to return to the present, Urataros remains to fight the two remaining New Mole Imagin and their reinforcements much to everyone feeling guilty about their earlier thoughts about him. Back in the present, Yuto uses his last red Zeronos ticket to fight the Death Imagin while Deneb holds off the massive army of Imagin to keep them from Airi as Kai begins to open the link to the Imagins' future, intent on destroying everything.
49 (Final)	"The Climax Goes on No Matter What"; Transliteration: "Kuraimakkusu wa Tsuzuku yo Dokomademo" (Japanese: クライマックスは続くよどこまでも)	Takao Nagaishi	Yasuko Kobayashi	January 20, 2008
By the time the DenLiner returns to the present, Kai uses his energy to destroy the city and link the present to his time. Ryotaro and Momotaros arrive at a building Kai is on, at which Ryotaro tells Momotaros his wish to fight alongside him to the very end. While Momotaros, along with Yuto and Deneb, fight off the Imagin army, Den-O confronts Kai and the Death Imagin. Kai unleashes his timepulse surge, turning the entire area into ruins, at which point Ryutaros arrives to try to save Ryotaro. Kai celebrates his apparent victory, but the devastation only wiped out the area they were fighting in. Ryotaro then reveals his missing memory, the one responsible for Kai's failure: the child of Airi and Sakurai and the true Junction Point key, Kohana (aka Hana). Furious, Kai now seeks to destroy time altogether. Deneb presents the last Zerono card to Yuto, telling him the future is his to rewrite. Naomi arrives with the DenLiner, bringing Urataros, Kintaros, and Sieg to the present time to join Ryotaro and company. Everyone fights off the Imagin army, and the battle is ended when Den-O Sword Form's final attack destroys the Death Imagin. Immediately after, Kai and all the Imagin fade, much to Ryotaro's and Yuto's dismay for the Taros and Deneb respectively. However, the Taros, Sieg, and Deneb have not disappeared. As Owner explains to the Station Master that memories are time, Ryotaro and Yuto's memories about their Imagin friends support their existence. Back at the hospital, Sakurai fades out of existence after watching over Airi, who believes she will meet him again in the future someday. Back at the DenLiner, Ryotaro returns the Rider Pass to Owner, giving his goodbyes and thanks to everyone. During Ryotaro's trip back to the Milk Dipper, the ZeroLiner and DenLiner pass by him. Everyone says their goodbyes to each other, and Momotaros says they will meet again in the future.
