= Shin Aomori =

Japanese voice actor

- 青森 伸
- Born: Kazuo Ichinohe; October 20, 1941 (age 84); Aomori Prefecture, Japan
- Occupations: Actor; voice actor; narrator
- Years active: 1961–present
- Agent: Aoni Production
- Height: 178 cm (5 ft 10 in)

Shin Aomori (青森 伸, Aomori Shin; born October 20, 1941) is a Japanese actor, voice actor and narrator from Aomori Prefecture. Previously affiliated with Tokyo Actor's Consumer's Cooperative Society and Sigma Seven, he is attached to Aoni Production. His birth name is Kazuo Ichinohe (一戸 和男, Ichinohe Kazuo). With his distinctive grim voice, he is best known as the Japanese voice of Doctor Drakken in Kim Possible and Kibito in Dragon Ball Z.

== Filmography ==
=== Television drama ===
- Shishino Jidai (1980 Taiga Drama), Shinzō Hashikawa, Shidō Hōgen
- Dokuganryū Masamune (1987 Taiga Drama), Furukawa Danjo

=== Tokusatsu ===
- Android Kikaider (1972-1973), Red Inimicus (ep. 27 & 28)
- Kikaider 01 (1973-1974), Mini Gorilla (ep. 36)
- Inazuman (1973-1974), Stone Banbara (ep. 24)
- Inazuman Flash (1974), Jet Desper (ep. 8)
- Himitsu Sentai Goranger (1975-1977), Gunman Masked (ep. 51), Windmill Masked (ep. 66), Glasses Masked (ep. 74)
- Kaiketsu Zubat (1977), Narrator
- J.A.K.Q. Dengekitai (1977), Devil Sphinx (ep. 12), Tentacle Lay Priest (ep. 28)
- Spider-Man (1978-1979), Cockroach Kombinat (ep. 24), Crab Demon (ep. 25)
- Battle Fever J (1979-1980), Cobra Monster (ep. 11), Jagged Tooth Monster (ep. 20), Curse Monster (ep. 46)
- Space Sheriff Gavan (1982-1983), Gamara Monster, Grudge Roadshow Narrator
- Chikyu Sentai Fiveman (1990-1991), Galaxy Demon God Barrugin (ep. 20)
- Kamen Rider Revice (2021-2022), Giff

=== Television animation ===
- Time Bokan (1975), Okānegi
- Muteking, The Dashing Warrior (1980), Takosaku
- Dr. Slump (1981), Gang leader, Killer Sniper
- Blue Comet SPT Layzner (1985), Zūru
- Dragon Ball (1986), Sergeant Metallic
- City Hunter (1987), Master
- Idol Densetsu Eriko (1989), Saijō
- Dragon Quest: The Adventure of Dai (1991), Matoriv
- YuYu Hakusho (1992), Kuromomo Tarō
- Nekketsu Saikyō Go-Saurer (1993), Gigu, Robot God
- Dragon Ball Z (1994), Kibito
- Mobile Fighter G Gundam (1994), Commissioner Karato
- After War Gundam X (1996), Fixx Bloodman
- Detective Conan (1996), Masayuki Ogawa
- Dragon Ball GT (1996), Qi Xing Lóng
- Hell Teacher Nūbē (1996), Hatamonba
- Steam Detectives (1998), Jimoshii
- Yu-Gi-Oh! (1998), Kanakura
- Da Capo of Love: Fujiko's Unlucky Days (1999), Antique arts dealer
- Boogiepop Phantom (2000), Tōka Miyashita's father
- Detective Conan (2000), Taiji Komiyama
- Detective Conan (2001), Futoshi Takarada
- Detective Conan (2002), Eizō Kurata
- Fullmetal Alchemist (2003), Basque Grand
- Detective Conan (2004), Officer Ogura
- Samurai Champloo (2004), Kogorō
- Genesis of Aquarion (2005), Johannes
- Nodame Cantabile (2007), Seiichirō Miyoshi
- Dragon Ball Kai (2014), Kibito
- One Piece (2014), Don Chinjao
- Rowdy Sumo Wrestler Matsutaro!! (2014), Raijin-oyakata
- Tonbo! (2024), Gonjii

=== Original video animation (OVA) ===
- Mobile Suit Gundam 0083: Stardust Memory (1991), Yuri Hasler
- Sohryuden: Legend of the Dragon Kings (1991), Seiichirō Toba
- Genesis of Aquarion (2007), Johannes

=== Original net animation (ONA) ===
- Moonrise (2025), Novice Harbinger

=== Theatrical animation ===
- Dragon Quest: Dai no Daiboken (1992), Matolif
- Dragon Ball Z: Wrath of the Dragon (1995), Hildegarn
- Crayon Shin-chan: Pursuit of the Balls of Darkness (1997), The Evil

=== Video games ===
- Dragon Ball series, Kibito, Hildegarn, Major Metallitron
- Klonoa 2: Lunatea's Veil (2001), Momett
- Mobile Suit Gundam: Encounters in Space (2003), Yuri Hasler
- Valkyria Chronicles 4 (2018), Andre Dunois
- Kingdom Hearts III (2019), Joshamee Gibbs
- Tales of Arise (2019), Kelzalik
- Persona 3 Reload (2024), Mutatsu
- Final Fantasy VII: Rebirth (2024), Mayor Zander

=== Dubbing ===
==== Live-action ====
- Kevin McNally
  - Pirates of the Caribbean: The Curse of the Black Pearl, Joshamee Gibbs
  - Pirates of the Caribbean: Dead Man's Chest, Joshamee Gibbs
  - Pirates of the Caribbean: At World's End, Joshamee Gibbs
  - Pirates of the Caribbean: On Stranger Tides, Joshamee Gibbs
  - Pirates of the Caribbean: Dead Men Tell No Tales, Joshamee Gibbs
- 12 Angry Men (VHS edition), Juror #2 (Ossie Davis)
- Ally McBeal, Robert Perry (Michael Kagan)
- Brothers & Sisters, William Walker (Tom Skerritt)
- Cliffhanger (1995 Fuji TV edition), Treasury Agent (Bruce McGill)
- Cliffhanger (1997 NTV edition), Walter Wright (Paul Winfield)
- Death Becomes Her, E.R. Doctor (Sydney Pollack)
- Dr. Dolittle, Grandpa Archer Dolittle (Ossie Davis)
- ER, Dexter Jenkins (Lou Beatty Jr.), Edgar Dixon (David Jean Thomas)
- Free Willy (1997 TV Asahi edition), Wade (Richard Riehle)
- GoldenEye, Jack Wade (Joe Don Baker)
- The Haunting, Doctor David Marrow (Liam Neeson)
- Mary Reilly, Mr. Reilly (Michael Gambon)
- Planet of the Apes, Colonel Attar (Michael Clarke Duncan)
- Star Wars: The Rise of Skywalker, Palpatine / Darth Sidious (Ian McDiarmid)
- Tenet, Sir Michael Crosby (Michael Caine)
- Titanic, Spicer Lovejoy (David Warner)
- Vampires, Cardinal Alba (Maximilian Schell)

==== Animation ====
- Aaahh!!! Real Monsters, The Gromble
- The Adventures of Tintin, Roberto Rastapopoulos
- Babar, Lord Rataxes
- Batman: the Animated Series, Joey "the Snail" Martin
- Chicken Run, Nick
- Kim Possible, Doctor Drakken
- The Many Adventures of Winnie the Pooh, Narrator
- The Simpsons, Principal Skinner
- The Tigger Movie, Narrator
