= Motomu Kiyokawa =

Japanese actor (1935–2022)

- 清川 元夢
- Born: April 9, 1935; Kanagawa Prefecture, Japan
- Died: August 17, 2022 (aged 87)
- Occupations: Actor; voice actor
- Years active: 1957–2022
- Agent: Tokyo Actor's Consumer's Cooperative Society

Motomu Kiyokawa (清川 元夢, Kiyokawa Motomu; April 9, 1935 – August 17, 2022) was a Japanese actor who specialized in voice acting. He was known for voicing Walter C. Dornez in Hellsing, Gargoyle in Nadia: The Secret of Blue Water, Kōzō Fuyutsuki in Neon Genesis Evangelion, Valkenhayn R. Hellsing in Blazblue, and Tippy in Is the Order a Rabbit?.

== Career ==
In 1957, he entered the Haiyuza theatrical training school; that same year, he joined a theater troupe fellowship, and in 1962, he formed Gekidan Theatre Company and Gekidan Dramahouse. His first voice acting role in an anime was for the 1964 anime adaption of Big X. Through working as an Acting Planner, he joined the Tokyo Actors' Co-operative in 1968. Most of Kiyokawa's voice roles were that of older men.

Although stage acting was his main occupation, he made his debut in voice acting dubbing a soldier in 1962's Combat!. He stated that the reason he did voice acting was "[just] to make money."

Together, he and Reiko Yamada established the "Dramahouse Voice Actor School D.D.", where he was an instructor.

He died of pneumonia on August 17, 2022, at age 87.

== Personality and characteristics ==
He was considered to be a baritone. His hobbies were judo and fencing.

In anime, he was a frequent contributor to Hideaki Anno's works, beginning with his role as Gargoyle in 1990's Nadia: The Secret of Blue Water and continuing with his role as Kōzō Fuyutsuki in Neon Genesis Evangelion.

As a voice actor, he was known for his roles as older characters. He also voiced many monsters in the Tokusatsu genre. Hideaki Anno specifically sought out Kiyokawa because he liked Kiyokawa's role in Himitsu Sentai Gorenger. Kiyokawa also played the role of Ultraman King in the Ultraman franchise, starting with Ultraman Leo.

Although Kiyokawa played many villains, he described his own voice was "soft", stating "I just can't turn into a real villain". Therefore, when he was asked to play the antagonist Gargoyle in Nadia: The Secret of Blue Water, Kiyokawa suggested to director Anno, "Why don't we play the roles in such a way that it is not clear who is the bad guy?". In addition to playing the role of the crew of the Nautilus, Kiyokawa provided commentary on the story from the second episode to the 23rd episode. In addition, when he voiced Dr. Mikamura in Mobile Fight G Gundam, director Yasuhiro Imagawa, after hearing Kiyokawa's voice, said, "I just can't make him a bad guy," and eventually changed Dr. Mikamura, who was originally set up as a bad guy, to a good guy.

After the deaths of Akio Miyabe, Kazumi Tanaka, Tatsuyuki Ishimori, and Ichiro Nagai, Kiyokawa took over some of their roles.

== Filmography ==
=== Television animation ===
- Big X (1964)
- Anne of Green Gables (1979 TV series) (1979) (Teddy Phillips)
- Mobile Suit Gundam (1979) (Tem Ray)
- Nadia: The Secret of Blue Water (1990) (Gargoyle)
- Mobile Fighter G Gundam (1994) (Dr. Mikamura)
- Neon Genesis Evangelion (1995) (Kōzō Fuyutsuki)
- Cardcaptor Sakura (1998) (Wei Wang)
- Kare Kano (1998) (Kawashima-sensei, Narrator)
- The Big O (1999) (Norman Burg)
- Pokémon: Master Quest (2002) (Pryce) (ep. 238 - 240)
- Hellsing (2006) (Walter C. Dollneaz)
- Nodame Cantabile (2007) (Charles Auclair)
- Kaitō Tenshi Twin Angel (2011) (Heinojou Nagatsuki)
- Nagi no Asukara (2013) (Isamu Kihara)
- BlazBlue Alter Memory (2013) (Valkenhayn R. Hellsing)
- JoJo's Bizarre Adventure: Stardust Crusaders (2014) (Roses)
- Is the Order a Rabbit? (2014) (Tippy)
- Nobunaga Concerto (2014) (Hirate Masahide)
- Is the Order a Rabbit?? (2015) (Tippy)
- Re:Zero − Starting Life in Another World (2016) (Miklotov McMahon)
- Twin Angel Break (2017) (Heinojou Nagatsuki (ep. 6, 8, 10 & 11))
- Restaurant to Another World (2017) (Altorius)
- Princess Principal (2017) (Beatrice (Imitation Voice (other by Fukushi Ochiai, Tessho Genda) "Corporal Henry") (ep. 3))
- Girls' Last Tour (2017) (Old Man (ep. 12))
- Hakumei and Mikochi (2018) (Hedgehog (ep. 11))
- Dances with the Dragons (2018) (Yākutō)
- Planet With (2018) (Takezō Ryūzōji)
- Tada Never Falls in Love (2018) (Old Couple "Male" (ep. 3))
- By the Grace of the Gods (2020) (Gain)
- Golden Kamuy Season 3 (2020) (Yо̄ichirо̄)
- Night Head 2041 (2021) (Elder Misaki)
- Restaurant to Another World 2 (2021) (Altorius)

Unknown date

- Future GPX Cyber Formula series (George Grayson and Jun Nakazawa)
- Medaka Box (Shiranui Hakama)
- Shakugan no Shana (Ramii)
- Shikigami no Shiro (Munchausen)
- Time of Eve (Shimei)
- Vampire Hunter D (Doctor Feringo)
- Vampire Hunter D: Bloodlust (John Elbourne)

=== OVA ===
- Birdy the Mighty (1995) (Inspector Megius)

=== Theatrical animation ===
- Neon Genesis Evangelion: Death & Rebirth (1997) (Kōzō Fuyutsuki)
- The End of Evangelion (1997) (Kōzō Fuyutsuki)
- Evangelion: 1.0 You Are (Not) Alone (2007) (Kōzō Fuyutsuki)
- Evangelion: 2.0 You Can (Not) Advance (2009) (Kōzō Fuyutsuki)
- Evangelion: 3.0 You Can (Not) Redo (2012) (Kōzō Fuyutsuki)
- Is the Order a Rabbit? ~Dear My Sister~ (2017) (Tippy)
- A Whisker Away (2020) (Kenzo Hinode)
- Evangelion: 3.0+1.0 Thrice Upon a Time (2021) (Kōzō Fuyutsuki)

=== Tokusatsu ===
- Kaiketsu Lion-Maru (Ghosn (episodes 33 & 34), Geromo (ep. 17), Garaitachi (ep. 40 & 41))
- Android Kikaider (Announcer (ep. 18), Octopus Gold (ep. 31))
- Kikaider 01 (Shadow Knight (eps. 17 - 19 (voiced by Masao Imanishi (eps. 8 - 16, 20 - 22), Takeshi Watabe (eps. 23 - 27)), Raijin Plus (Minus voiced by Eisuke Yoda) (ep. 29))
- Inazuman (Five Banbara (ep. 1))
- Inazuman Flash (Machine Gun Desper (ep. 5), Black Desper (ep. 22))
- Tetsujin Tiger Seven (Snake Genjin (ep. 5))
- Akumaizer 3 (Mummygo (ep. 11))
- Ultraman Leo (Ultraman King (ep 39) and Alien Babarue (ep. 39))
- Himitsu Sentai Gorenger (Vein Mask (ep. 26), Iron Princess Mask (ep. 33))
- Space Ironman Kyodain (Gaburin SS (ep. 22))
- Red Tiger (Commander Gettarar (ep. 1), Commander Rikiyar (ep. 13))
- Battle Fever J (Fireball Monster (ep. 6))
- Silver Jaguer (Narration)※Television pilot
- Dai Sentai Goggle V (Terano Mozoo (ep. 25))
- Choukou Senshi Changéríon (Bakuriner (ep. 10))
- Denji Sentai Megaranger (Toad Nejire (ep. 17))
- Kyuukyuu Sentai GoGo-V (Tomb Profanation Psyma Beast Zombeast (ep. 23))
- Mirai Sentai Timeranger (Sadist Gougan (ep. 11))
- Tokusou Sentai Dekaranger (Alien Customer (ep. 26), Mishiroian Dr.Monten (ep. 41))
- Ultraman Mebius (Alien Babarue (ep. 35))
- Hikari Saga (Ultraman King and Alien Babarue)

=== Video games ===
- BlazBlue: Calamity Trigger (xxxx) (Valkenhayn R. Hellsing)
- BlazBlue: Continuum Shift (xxxx) (Valkenhayn R. Hellsing)
- BlazBlue: Chrono Phantasma (xxxx) (Valkenhayn R. Hellsing)
- Shapeshifter: Makai Eiyuuden (xxxx) (Magnus the Wize) (Japanese dub)
- Sly 2: Band of Thieves (xxxx) (Arpeggio) (Japanese dub)
- Tail Concerto (xxxx) (Chamberlain)
- Is the Order a Rabbit?? Wonderful party! (xxxx) (Tippy)
- Neon Genesis Evangelion: Girlfriend of Steel (Kōzō Fuyutsuki) (1997)
- Neon Genesis Evangelion: Girlfriend of Steel 2nd (Kōzō Fuyutsuki) (2005)
- Mighty No. 9 (2016) (Dr. Blackwell)
- Final Fantasy XIV Online: A Realm Reborn (2013) (Louisoix Leveilleur)
- Final Fantasy VII Remake (2020) (Mayor Domino)
- Fire Emblem Heroes (2023) (Gotoh)

=== Dubbing roles ===
- Combat! (Soldier)
- Ad Astra (Colonel Thomas Pruitt (Donald Sutherland))
- Awakenings (Dr. Peter Ingham (Max von Sydow))
- Charlie and the Chocolate Factory (DVD edition) (Grandpa Joe (David Kelly))
- Drunken Master (Professor Kai-Hsin (Dean Shek))
- Her (Alan Watts)
- Home Alone (1994 Fuji TV edition) (Marley (Roberts Blossom))
- Independence Day: Resurgence (Julius Levinson (Judd Hirsch))
- The Interpreter (Nils Lud (Jesper Christensen))
- Jungleland ('Colonel' Yates (John Cullum))
- Miss Peregrine's Home for Peculiar Children (Oggie (Nicholas Amer))
- Moonfall (Holdenfield (Donald Sutherland))
- Twin Peaks (1990–91) (Giant (Carel Struycken))
- Twin Peaks (2017) ("???????" (Carel Struycken))
