= Daisuke Ban =

Japanese actor

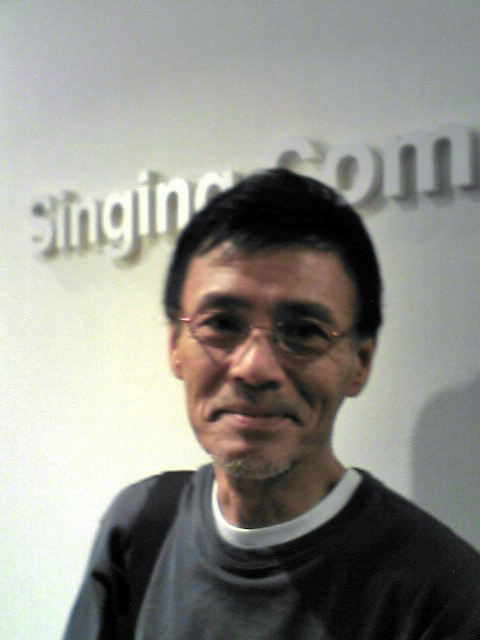
Ban Daisuke.

Daisuke Ban (伴 大介, Ban Daisuke), born Kiyonori Saito (斎藤 清憲, Saitō Kiyonori), is a Japanese actor. He was born on May 5, 1947, in Saitama prefecture, north of Tokyo. He is best known for portraying several heroic roles in tokusatsu, including Jiro in Android Kikaider and Goro Watari in Inazuman.

== Life ==
Ban attended Saitama-Ken High School. While in college, Ban performed in a theater group that performed the works of French playwrights. He held a small job at a teahouse during college. Though he considered becoming a salaryman, ultimately he turned to acting. His first role was Oumuto Ni Watori, in 1971. He did not, however, audition for his breakout role in Kikaider. His photo was one of many sent in to NET while they were casting the programme - Ban was one of several finalists, and the producer's wife reportedly looked at his photo and said, "He's the one!". He was then cast in the title role. According to Ban in an interview in Otaku USA magazine, his casting was fairly typical, with him meeting Toei executives.

Ban appeared in all 43 episodes of the original Kikaider, and also appeared in several episodes of the sequel series Kikaider 01. According to Ban, Kikaider was very much like a typical television drama, and not significantly different despite the subject matter and formula of the show. He felt that the strength of the series lay in the story and characters, even though the action scenes are those most typically highlighted. He has described Kikaider's story as "perfect", and expressed his desire for the series to be remade (he did not mention the anime adaptation released in 2000). He also commented in the Otaku USA interview that he only met Kikaider's creator, Shotaro Ishinomori, once.

He played the title character on Inazuman, Ban was also a regular on Ninja Captor and Gridman the Hyper Agent. Later in life, he starred in Ring, Spiral, Ring 2, and Ring 0: Birthday, renewing some of his cult popularity. He also starred in television advertisements for Ajinomoto and Marui Department stores. He took over Yukio Itô's role as Battle Cossack in the Super Sentai series, Battle Fever J. Despite the iconic nature of his tokusatsu performances, he has said that he doesn't believe modern henshin hero shows have the same positive spirit as they once did, and that they are not able to excite children the way they used to.

Ban, along with the star of Kikaider 01, Shunsuke Ikeda, has gained cult popularity in both Hawaii due to Kikaider being broadcast there. Both of them attribute this to the flawed nature of the characters, the vibrant colors of the show, and the power of the good-vs-evil story.

Though he is best remembered for his performances in tokusatsu programs, he has appeared in numerous different television series' of varying genres. Most recently, Ban appeared in the short film House of the Restless Spirits, released as part of the compilation Scary True Stories produced by horror film magazine Fangoria.

Ban currently resides in Nagasaki, Japan, and his autobiography, Jinzo Ningen Kikaidā: Jiro Tabi no Tochu de ("Super Android Kikaider: In The Midst of Jiro's Journey"), was published in August 2001 by Kadokawa Shoten.
