= Shunsuke Ikeda =

Japanese actor and model

- Shunsuke Ikeda in 1971
- Born: Norio Ikeda; November 11, 1940; Kawasaki, Kanagawa, Japan
- Died: June 11, 2010 (aged 69)
- Occupation: Actor/Model
- Years active: 1962–2010

Shunsuke Ikeda (池田 駿介, Ikeda Shunsuke; November 11, 1940 – June 11, 2010) was a Japanese actor and model.

== Acting career ==
Born Norio Ikeda (池田 紀生, Ikeda Norio), he was best known to tokusatsu fans as the android Ichiro in the Kikaider 01 series (1973–74). Ikeda's interest in acting came at an early age from his father, respected sword fight choreographer Tatsuo Ouchi. He also had a black belt in judo and karate. Ikeda studied with the Bunka-za Theater, first appearing on-screen in Hibari's Guitar of Motherly Love (1962).

Ikeda made only a handful of films, but found his niche on television, where he appeared in such shows as Special Mobile Investigation Unit (1963), Comrades (1963), Story of Coming Wind (1963), Aboard With 27 People (1964) and Onihei Hankacho (1969–70).

While Ikeda's biggest and best-known tokusatsu role was in Kikaider 01, and Takeshi Minami in Return of Ultraman, he also appeared in Operation: Mystery (1968–69), Silver Mask (1971–72), Himitsu Sentai Gorenger (1975–77), and Ultraman Mebius & Ultraman Brothers (2006).

== Education ==
Ikeda graduated from Hosei University in 1967 with a degree in economics.

== Later years ==
Ikeda was a fashion model for the SOS Modeling Agency, a commercial spokesman for Toshiba, and also appeared in several stage productions.

== Popularity ==
Ikeda developed a fan following in Hawaii as well as Japan. In 2001, he and Kikaider star Daisuke Ban made a personal appearance in Hawaii, meeting with fans who grew up watching the Honolulu broadcasts of Kikaider and Kikaider 01. This led to both series being revived on TV and released on DVD, as well as additional live appearances, special events, and autograph sessions in both Japan and Hawaii.

In a 2008 interview, Ikeda mentioned that he was upset that Kikaider's Hawaii popularity was not widely known in Japan.

== Death ==
Ikeda died on June 11, 2010, from complications of diabetes.

== Filmography ==
Year	Title	Role	Notes
1963	Tokubetsu kidô sôsatai		
1963	Tokubetsu kidô sôsatai: Tokyo eki ni harikome		
1966	Ichiman sanzennin		
1971-1972	The Return of Ultraman	Takeshi Minami	51 episodes
1973-1974	Kikaider 01	Ichiro / Kikaider 01	46 episodes
1977	Himitsu Sentai Gorenger	Jiro Daigo	Episode 83
