= Yuki Hide =

Japanese singer

Yuki Hide (ヒデ 夕樹, Hide Yūki; real name: Hideyuki Hirano (平野 英之, Hirano Hideyuki), November 5, 1940 – December 8, 1998) often credited as Hideyuki or Yuuki Hide, was a Japanese singer best known for singing theme songs to various anime and tokusatsu shows.

He died from heart failure on December 8, 1998. His biography, Hide Yuki and the Golden Age of TV Cartoon Theme Songs (ヒデ夕樹とテレビまんが主題歌の黄金期), written by Hikaru Kenmochi, was published in 2021.

== Selected discography ==
=== Anime and tokusatsu ===
Year	Work	Song	Ref
1970	Ashita no Joe	Toru Rikiishi's Theme – ending theme	
1972	Jinzo Ningen Kikaida	Go Go Kikaida (w/The Columbia Cradle Club) – opening theme	
1972	Jinzo Ningen Kikaida	Fight!! Mechanical Man Kikaida (w/The Columbia Cradle Club) – ending theme	
1972	Kaiketsu Lion-Maru	Oh Wind, Oh Light (w/Young Fresh) – opening theme	
1972	Triton of the Sea	GO! GO! Triton – opening theme	
1973	Tetsujin Taiga Sebun (Tetsujin Tiger Seven)	Iron Man Tiger Seven – opening theme	
1974	Inazuman Flash	Flash! Inazuman – opening theme	
1974	Ultraman Leo	"Fight! Ultraman Leo" (w/Mizuumi Youth Choir) – 2nd opening theme	
1976	Blocker Gundan IV Machine Blaster	Blocker Gundan IV Machine Blaster (w/Toei Jidou Gasshoudan) – opening theme	
1978	Sutâurufu (Star Wolf (TV series))	Seishun no Tabidachi – opening theme	
1978	Sutâurufu (Star Wolf (TV series))	Sasurai no Star Wolf – ending theme	
1978	Spider-Man (tokusatsu)	Run! Spider-Man – opening theme	
1978	Spider-Man (tokusatsu)	Ballad of an Oath – ending theme	
1979	Captain Future	Yume no Funanori – Opening theme	
1979	Captain Future	Oira wa Sabishii Spaceman – Insert Song	

=== TV commercial ===
Year	Work	Notes	Ref
1973	Hitachi Tree (often called "Kono ki Nanno ki?")	Corporate commercial of Hitachi	
