= Ishimori Production =

Japanese film production company

Ishimori Production Inc.
- Logo used since 2008

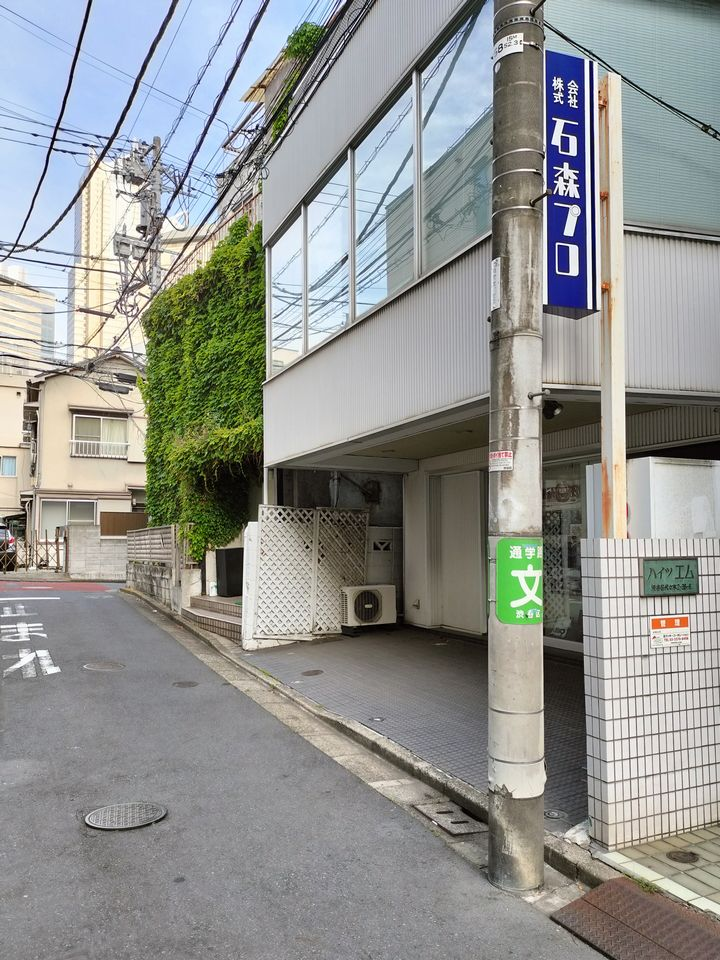
- Headquarters in Shibuya, Tokyo
- Native name: 株式会社石森プロ
- Romanized name: Kabushiki-gaisha Ishimori Puro
- Type: Private KK
- Industry: Media
- Predecessor: Ishimori Entertainment
- Founded: 1967; 59 years ago
- Founder: Shotaro Ishinomori
- Headquarters: Yoyogi, Shibuya, Tokyo, Japan
- Key people: Akira Onodera (President)
- Website: ishimoripro.com

Ishimori Production Inc. (株式会社石森プロ, Kabushiki-gaisha Ishimori Puro) is a Japanese production company that plans and develops works created by, and also serves as the literary estate of manga artist Shotaro Ishinomori, headquartered in Yoyogi, Tokyo. Such works include Cyborg 009, 009-1, Kikaider, Inazuman, Ganbare!! Robocon, Voicelugger, the Toei Fushigi Comedy Series, the Kamen Rider series, Goranger and J.A.K.Q. (the later two serving as the very first entries of the Super Sentai series respectively). In Indonesia, it is also present in the original tokusatsu series Indonesia, namely BIMA Satria Garuda and Satria Garuda BIMA-X based on Kamen Rider series.

== Works ==
=== Live-action ===
==== TV series ====
| Debut year | Title | No. of episodes | Co-produced with |
|---|---|---|---|
| 1971 | Kamen Rider (Shōwa) series | 448 | Toei Company |
| 1972 | Android Kikaider | 43 | Toei Company |
| 1973 | Kikaider 01 | 46 | Toei Company |
| 1973 | Robot Detective | 26 | Toei Company |
| 1973 | Inazuman | 25 | Toei Company |
| 1974 | Inazuman Flash | 23 | Toei Company |
| 1974 | Ganbare Robocon | 118 | Toei Company |
| 1975 | Gorenger | 84 | Toei Company |
| 1975 | Akumaizer 3 | 38 | Toei Company |
| 1976 | Kyodain | 48 | Toei Company |
| 1977 | Zubat | 32 | Toei Company |
| 1977 | Daitetsujin 17 | 35 | Toei Company |
| 1977 | J.A.K.Q. | 35 | Toei Company |
| 1978 | Message from Space: Galactic Wars | 27 | Toei Company |
| 1981 | Robot 8-chan | 52 | Toei Company |
| 1982 | Batten Robomaru | 51 | Toei Company |
| 1983 | Pettonton | 46 | Toei Company |
| 1984 | Machineman | 36 | Toei Company |
| 1984 | Nemurin | 31 | Toei Company |
| 1985 | Kamitaman | 51 | Toei Company |
| 1985 | Byclosser | 34 | Toei Company |
| 1986 | Morimori Bokkun | 39 | Toei Company |
| 1987 | Detective Team Hardgumi | 50 | Toei Company |
| 1988 | Detective Team Maringumi | 50 | Toei Company |
| 1989 | Magical Chinese Girl Paipai! | 26 | Toei Company |
| 1989 | Magical Chinese Girl Ipanema | 23 | Toei Company |
| 1990 | Poitrine | 51 | Toei Company |
| 1991 | Thutmose | 51 | Toei Company |
| 1992 | Great Dragon Palace | 51 | Toei Company |
| 1993 | Chouchoutrian | 42 | Toei Company |
| 1995 | Masked Rider | 40 | Saban Entertainment |
| 1999 | Voicelugger | 12 | Salt Production |
| 1999 | Moero Robocon | 51 | Toei Company |
| 2000 | Kamen Rider (Heisei) series | 960 | Toei Company |
| 2009 | Kamen Rider: Dragon Knight | 40 | Adness Entertainment |
| 2013 | Garuda Knight BIMA | 26 | MNC Media |
| 2014 | Garuda Knight BIMA-X | 50 | MNC Media |
| 2016 | Kamen Rider Amazons | 26 | Toei Company |
| 2019 | Kamen Rider (Reiwa) series | 275+ | Toei Company |
| 2022 | Kamen Rider: Black Sun | 10 | Toei Company |

==== Films ====
| Year | Title | Co-produced with |
|---|---|---|
| 1992 | Shin Kamen Rider: Prologue | Toei Company |
| 2005 | Kamen Rider: The First | Toei Company |
| 2007 | Kamen Rider: The Next | Toei Company |
| 2013 | 009-1: The End of the Beginning | Toei Company |
| 2014 | Kikaider Reboot | Kadokawa Daiei Studio |
| 2017 | Satria Heroes: Revenge of Darkness | MNC Media |
| 2023 | Shin Kamen Rider | Cine Bazar |

==== TV specials and short films ====
| Year | Title | Runtime | Co-produced with |
|---|---|---|---|
| 1984 | Kamen Rider ZX | 40 minutes | Toei Company |
| 1993 | Kamen Rider ZO | 50 minutes | Toei Company |
| 1994 | Kamen Rider J | 50 minutes | Toei Company |
| 1994 | Kamen Rider World | 10 minutes | Toei Company |
| 2007 | Skull Man: Prologue Of Darkness | 30 minutes | Geneon Entertainment |

=== Anime ===
Credited as Ishimori Entertainment.

| Debut year | Title | No. of episodes | Animation studio(s) |
|---|---|---|---|
| 2000 | Android Kikaider: The Animation | 13 | Radix; Studio OX |
| 2001 | Kikaider 01: The Animation | 4 | Radix; Studio OX |
| 2001 | Cyborg 009: The Cyborg Soldier | 51 | Japan Vistec; Studio OX |
| 2003 | Gilgamesh | 26 | Group TAC; Japan Vistec |
| 2006 | 009–1 | 12 | XeNN Studios |
| 2007 | Skull Man | 13 | Bones |
| 2012 | 009 Re:Cyborg | Movie | Production I.G. Sanzigen |
| 2016 | Cyborg 009: Call of Justice | 12 | OLM; Signal MD |
| 2022 | Kamen Rider W: Fuuto PI | 12 | Studio Kai |
| 2024 | The Portrait of Kamen Rider Skull | Movie | Studio Kai |
