= Kikaider 01 =

Japanese television series

- Original Japanese title card

Japanese name
- Kanji: キカイダー01
Transcriptions
- Revised Hepburn: Kikaidā Zero Wan
- Genre: Science fiction Superhero fiction Action
- Based on: Kikaider manga by Shotaro Ishinomori
- Developed by: Shukei Nagasaka
- Screenplay by: Shukei Nagasaka; Hirohisa Soda; Kuniaki Oshikawa
- Directed by: Yasutada Nagano
- Starring: Shunsuke Ikeda; Daisuke Ban; Etsuko Shihomi; Yoshihide Goto; Kazuyo Sumita; Hijiri Matsuki; Kiyotaka Ishi; Nobuo Yana
- Narrated by: Masaki Okabe
- Opening theme: "Kikaider 01" by Masato Shimon
- Ending theme: "01 Rock" by Masato Shimon
- Composer: Michiaki Watanabe
- Country of origin: Japan
- Original language: Japanese
- No. of episodes: 46

Production
- Producer: Tōru Hirayama
- Production companies: Toei Company; Ishimori Productions

Original release
- Network: TV Asahi
- Release: 12 May 1973 – 30 March 1974

Related
- Android Kikaider (1972)

Kikaider 01 (キカイダー01, Kikaidā Zero Wan) (pronounced as Kikaider Zero One), is a tokusatsu superhero TV series, and a sequel series to Android Kikaider. Produced by Toei Company and Ishimori Productions, it was broadcast on NET (now TV Asahi) from May 12, 1973 to March 30, 1974, with a total of 46 episodes. Its title in Hawaii is Kikaida 01 (based on the Japanese title).

Kikaider 01 made an appearance alongside Kikaider, Inazuman, and Zubat in the 2011 movie OOO, Den-O, All Riders: Let's Go Kamen Riders.

== Plot ==
The noted robotics expert Dr. Kohmyoji created a powerful android to protect Japan from evil forces. When Hakaider starts his evil organization, Dr. Kohmyoji's android, Kikaider 01, awakens to fight Hakaider.

Hakaider has three assistants, Red Hakaider, Blue Hakaider, and Silver Hakaider. Together, they devise various schemes to cause destruction, but Kikaider 01 stops them all. Kikaider appears to assist Kikaider 01. Their chief goal is to capture a young boy, named Akira.

After Hakaider's attempts fail, a new, mysterious character appears, Shadow Knight. Shadow Knight is a member of a competing, evil organization, SHADOW. When SHADOW proved to be more powerful than Hakaider, Hakaider unwillingly becomes a member of SHADOW.

It was later revealed that Hakaider has the brain of Professor Gill (also from the Kikaider TV series) within him. Professor Gill had designed a powerful robot and had tattooed the plans onto Kubo Clan’s two sons: Akira and his brother Hiroshi. Throughout the series, SHADOW helps Gill in building his robot, and Kikaider 01's fights to stop them.

== Characters ==
=== Heroes ===
- Ichiro/Kikaider 01: A powerful fighting android. In human form, Ichiro uses a trumpet to announce his presence. 01 is solar powered, so Ichiro cannot transform in the dark.
- Jiro/Kikaider: Another android fighting for good. In human form, Jiro uses a guitar to announce his presence.
- Akira Kubo: The Son of The Kubo Clan.
- Hiroshi Kubo: Akira's brother.
- Rieko: A mysterious woman from Professor Gill's past. Akira's guardian. Usually appears in disguise. In episode 24, she sacrificed herself.
- Misao: Hiroshi's tutor when DARK was operating. She and Hiroshi were made homeless by Kikaider's destruction of the DARK. Misao became a pick-pocket. After death of Rieko, Misao becomes the guardian of both Hiroshi and Akira.
- Gunta Momochi: Inept photographer who takes the place of Hanpei. Claims to be decedent of ninja Sandayu Momochi. Last seen in episode 19.
- Mari/Bijinder: A female android. Designed to destroy 01 and Kikaider but eventually she becomes 01 and Kikaider's ally and friend.
- Waruder: Robot samurai assassin hired by Big Shadow to kill Kikaider 01. He develops feelings for Bijinder, but doesn't understand them. She cannot accept him as long as he insists on killing her friend 01. Likes children, afraid of dogs.

Note: Both Hanpei Hattori and Dr. Kohmyoji (from the Kikaider TV series) make guest appearances

=== Villains ===
- Big Shadow: Mysterious leader of SHADOW. Originally heard but not seen. When he is first seen its as a shadow. Dresses in black, hides his face behind a mask.
- Professor Gill/Hakaider: After the fall of DARK, Gill survived his demise by having his brain transplanted into the body of Hakaider after Kohmyoji's brain was removed from it. He initially leads the Hakaider Squad to destroy Kikaider, but ends up becoming a high ranked member in SHADOW. He can also transform into the Ghostbot Black Dragon, who possesses telekinesis and the Dragon Machine Gun built into his right hand.
- Giant Devil: A Giant Robot who's been destroyed by Kikaider and 01 in episode 18.
- Shadow Knight: One-eyed android, original second in command of SHADOW. Replaced by Hakaider. Shadow Knight and Hakaider become rivals, not allowing the other to have the glory of defeating 01.
- Zadam: Two-headed robot from SHADOW's base on the moon. Replaces Hakaider as second in command of SHADOW. Hakaider and Shadow Knight resent Zadam.

=== Hakaider Squad ===
The first set of villains Kikaider 01 encounters, led by Gill-Hakaider who the others being Dark scientists who also transplanted their brains into android bodies. While normally in Hakaider form, they can transform into Ghostbots or combine into Gattaider with numerous powers include flight, body missiles called the Death Missile, teleportation, the weapons of the Hakaiders, and a mentally controlled boomerang on the left shoulder.

- Silver Hakaider: His Ghostbot form is Silver Shrimp, whose powers include pincer claw hands, converting himself into blood and a cake, and rolling into a ball called the Rolling Mine. He's been destroyed by Kikaider 01 in episode 10.
- Blue Hakaider: His Ghostbot form of Blue Crocodile, whose powers include a portable egg to regenerate, strong stomach acid, and a launchable set of strong jaws. He and Red Hakaider have been destroyed by Kikaider 01 in episode 9.
- Red Hakaider: His Ghostbot form is Red Centipede, whose powers include a human disguise, spawning centipedes, explosive launchable venomous spines from the body called the Centipede Spines, and body part separation. He and Blue Hakaider have been destroyed by Kikaider 01 in episode 9.

=== Soldiers ===
- Androidbots: They're for the Hakaider Squad.
- Shadowmen: They're the same design as the Androidbots and for the Evil Organization Shadow.

=== Deathbots ===
Deathbots are the commanders of the Shadow.

- Crimson Turtle: Appears in episodes 9-11. Powers include a bo staff, a boomerang claw for each hand, and high jumping.
- Ghost Woman: Appears in episode 11. Powers include summoning fire balls, levitation, fangs, a 7-tube missile launcher in the left arm called the Deathfire Missile, spinning very fast to burrow underground, and splitting into four shadow men in a technique called the clone attack.
- Bakeneko: Appears in episode 12. Powers include morphing into a cat, a human disguise, a mouth flamethrower called the Cat Fire, launchable arms with sharp claws, and head detachment.
- Shadow Rokuro-Kubi: Appears in episode 13. Powers include a 2-meter neck used for coiling, teleporting individuals near her, remote controlled arms, neck detachment called the Rokuro Hammer, and two machine guns in each arm socket.
- Oiwa Owl: Appears in episode 14. Powers include mouth toxic gas, teleportation, mirror illusions, a human disguise, high jumping, and a pair of explosive dart launchers in the mouth called the Owl Poison Darts.
- Shinigami Robot: Appears in episode 15. Powers include a tentacle whip for each arm, a cannon on the head, and teleportation.
- Shadow Mummy: Appears in episode 16. Powers include a human disguise, nitro bombs from the right arm, separation and reformation, and dividing into flamingos.
- Shadow Golem: Appears in episode 16. Powers include a human disguise, pincer claw hands, sonic waves from the torso speaker called the Hell Ray, and teleportation.
- Poisonous Mendicant: Appears in episode 17. Powers include a human disguise, a bamboo flamethrower in the right palm, and explosive head rings.
- King Indian: Appears in episode 19. Powers include a human powers, a bow and arrows, telepathic explosions called the Curse of Death, a tomahawk, and a knife.
- Vampire Bats: Appear in episode 21. Powers include clawed detachable wing bombs called the Dracula Cloak, regeneration, flight, and a detachable head armed with a mouth flamethrower called the Dracula Head.
- Scorpion Strong: Appears in episode 22. Powers include a human disguise, invisibility, explosive gas from the claws and tail, and hypnotic eyes.
- Automated Skeleton: Appears in episode 22. Powers include launchable arms and a mouth flamethrower.
- Thorned Starfish: Appears in episode 23. Powers include a human disguise, squid whip arms, spawning starbots from severed body parts in a technique called the Dividing Starfish, and an acid stream from the face called the Acid Blast.
- Pigman: Appear in episode 24. Powers include pig transformation, a knife, and teleportation.
- Mad Pig: Appears in episode 24. Powers include a human disguise, a mouth flamethrower called the Pig Fire, and a chain in the launchable nose called the Pig Nose.
- Tengu Flying Squirrel: Appears in episode 26. Powers include a human disguise, a wooden staff, and teleportation.
- Hell Kappa: Appears in episodes 26 & 27. Powers include swimming, strong grabbing, and a hydrogen bomb on his back.
- Mermabot: Appears in episode 28. Powers include a human disguise, a blinding beam from the body called Mermaid Spin Beam, teleportation, a mantis claw for the left hand, explosive scales on the waist called the Mermaid Scale Attack, a laser from the scalp probe called the Angler Laser, and a pair of bombs called the Mermaid Breast Bombs.
- Raijin Plus and Raijin Minus: Appear in episode 29. Powers include a pair of thundersticks, electromotive force that freezes objects, electric explosions called the Thunder Shock, teleportation, brain freezing using flying drums that makes organisms lazy, stun bolts called the Thunder Chain, converting in 10 giga bolt attack called the Thunder Death Beam, and their drum rings like boomerangs.
- Pollution Catfish: Appears in episode 30. Powers include swimming, toxic mouth gas called the Catfish Gas, liquid bombs from the body that become invisible after ground contact, a human disguise, a pair of extendable whiskers called the Deadly Catfish Whiskers, teleportation, and stomping hard enough to cause an earthquake called the Catfish Quake.
- Inked Squid: Appears in episode 32. Powers include low explosive body ink from the right hand called Ink Bombs, a whip for the left arm, mouth flames called the Ink Squid Flame, a human disguise, and teleportation.
- Big Gorilla: Appears in episode 33. Powers include armor that records attack data and a bazooka in the right hand called the Gorilla Bazooka.
- Mini Gorilla: Appears in episode 33. He possesses no known powers.
- Crazy Cuckoo: Appears in episode 34. Powers include disguising himself as a statue, eye sound waves that cause violence called the Second Cycle Sound Wave, teleportation, and a beak cannon called the Crazy Cuckoo Cannon.
- Kimono Poison Fang: Appears in episode 35. Powers include disguising herself as a kimono and wig, sharp claws for fingers, and mentally spawning embers called the Kimono Poison Fang Flame.
- Spaceman Robots: Appears in episode 39. Their only known power is a freezing and melting hybrid gun.
- Satan: 41 His only known power is flight.
- Roboshadows: Appear in episode 42. Their only known power is explosive gas from the fingertips.
- 01 Shadow: Appears in episode 42. Possesses no known powers.
- Bijinder Shadow: Appears in episode 42. Possesses no known powers.
- Waruder Shadow: Appears in episode 42. His only know power is a chained harpoon.
- Aqualungbots: Appears in episode 43. Powers include swimming and explosive flashes.
- Warrior Ronin Robots: Appears in episode 45. Powers include ink seeking katanas and teleportation.

== Episode list ==
1. "Invincibility!! Birth of Android 01!!" (無敵!! 人造人間ゼロワン誕生!!, Muteki!! Jinzō Ningen Zero Wan Tanjō!!)
2. "Hakaider: What is his 4th Rank Attack!?" (ハカイダー四段攻撃とは何か!?, Hakaidā Yon Dan Kōgeki to wa Nani ka!?)
3. "The Return of Jiro, aka Kikaider" (帰ってきたジロー キカイダー, Kaettekita Jirō Kikaidā)
4. "Outrageous! The Spectre Robot Termination!?" (怪奇! 幽霊ロボット消滅!?, Kaiki! Yōrei Robotto Shōmetsu!?)
5. "Terror! The Egg will Laugh at the Blue Crocodile Island!!" (恐怖! 青ワニ島で卵が笑う!!, Kyōfu! Ao Wani Shima de Tamago ga Warau!!)
6. "The Magician vs. 01's Secret Ability!!" (魔術師対ゼロワンの秘密能力!!, Majutsushi Tai Zero Wan no Himitsu Nōryoku)
7. "Thunderbolt! Function Decline 01's Direct Hit" (落雷! 機能低下のゼロワン直撃, Rakurai! Kinō Teiga no Zero Wan Chokugeki)
8. "Ichiro's Crisis! 4 Massive Fusion!!" (イチロー危機! 四人衆合体!!, Ichirō Kiki! Yonin Shū Gattai!!)
9. "Great Crime Organization: The Mysterious of the Appearing Shadow!!" (大犯罪組織シャドウ出現の怪!!, Dai Hanzai Soshiki Shadō Shutsugen no Kai!!)
10. "Great Leader: A Mysterious Big Shadow!? (大首領ビッグシャドウの怪奇!?", Dai Shuryō Biggu Shadō no Kaiki!?)
11. "Ghost Story: Underground Secret Base's Spectre Woman" (怪談 地下秘密基地の幽霊女, Kaidan Chika Himitsu Kichi no Yōrei Onna)
12. "Ghost Story: The Graveyard of the Freshly Severed Head of the Confused Cat Curse" (怪談 墓場の化猫呪いの生首, Kaidan Hakaba no Bakasu Neko Noroi no Namakubi)
13. "Ghost Story: The Challenge of Ghost Pulley Neck" (怪談 妖怪ロクロ首の挑戦, Kaidan Yōkai Rokuro Kubi no Chōsen)
14. "Ghost Story: Gill's Apparition Will Curse With Hell" (怪談 ギルの亡霊が地獄で呪う, Kaidan Giru no Bōrei ga Jigoku de Norou)
15. "Explosion: Giant Devil's Secret" (爆発 ジャイアントデビルの秘密, Bakuhatsu Jaianto Debiru no Himitsu)
16. "Terror! Mummy Man's Nitro Bomb" (恐怖! ミイラ男のニトロ爆弾, Kyōfu! Mīra Otoko no Nitoro Bakudan)
17. "Great Work!! The Terrifying Giant Devil Starts" (大巨篇!! 恐怖の巨人(ジャイアント)デビル始動, Dai Kyohen!! Kyōfu no Jaianto Debiru Shidō)
18. "First Historical and Probably The Last!! The Android Great Explosion" (史上空前絶後!! 人造人間大爆発, Shijō Kūzenzetsugo!! Jinzō Ningen Dai Bakuhatsu)
19. "King Indian: The Incarnation of Mortal!!" (キングインデアン必殺の呪文!!, Kingu Indean Hissatsu no Shumon!!)
20. "Great Fury: Shadow Leader's Conscious Confirm" (大狂乱シャドウ首領の正体判明, Dai Kyōran Shadō Shuryō no Shōtai Hanmei)
21. "Bloodsucking Mansion: Terror of the Beautiful Girls' Hostel!!" (吸血の館 美人女子寮の恐怖!!, Kyūketsu no Yakata Bijin Joshi Ryō no Kyōfu!!)
22. "Special Lesson of Japan is the Murder Practice?!" (本日の特別授業は殺人訓練?!, Nippon no Tokubetsu Jugyō wa Satsujin Kunren?!)
23. "The Devilish Starfish Woman: Just in Front of the Mankind Extinction!!" (悪魔のヒトデ女 人類絶滅寸前!!, Akuma no Hitode Onna Jinrui Zetsumetsu Sunzen!!)
24. "Devilish Performance!? The Earth Pig's Planet Project" (悪魔の業!? 地球ブタの惑星計画, Akuma no Waza!? Chikyū Buta no Wakusei Keikaku)
25. "The Devilish Child Zadam: Lunar World Base Departure" (悪魔の子ザダム 月世界基地発進, Akuma no Ko Zadamu Gessekai Kichi Hasshin)
26. "Deathmatch of the South Era!! Zadam: ESP Demonstration" (南紀の死斗!! ザダム超能力発揮, Minamiki no Shitō!! Zadamu Chōnōryoku Hakki)
27. "Hot Contest of the Secluded Region!! Zadam's Infernal Trap" (秘境の激戦!! ザダムの地獄の罠, Hikyō no Gekisen!! Zadamu no Jigoku no Wana)
28. "Lunatic Town: The Terrifying Mermaid's Great Counterattack" (狂った町 恐怖の人魚姫大逆襲, Kurutta Machi Kyōfu Ningyo Hime Dai Gyakushū)
29. "Red Ogre, Blue Ogre: The Terrifying 10 Billion Volts!!" (赤鬼 青鬼 恐怖の100億V(ボルト)!!, Aka Oni Ao Oni Kyōfu no Hyaku Oku Boruto!!)
30. "A Devil? An Angel? Bijinder Makes Her Appearance!!" (悪魔? 天使? ビジンダー出現!!, Akuma? Tenshi? Bijindā Shutsugen!!)
31. "The Helpless Android Bijinder: Bomb Victim" (哀れ人造人間ビジンダー爆死, Aware Jinzōningen Bijindā Bakushi)
32. "Calling into the Underworld: Bijinder" (地獄に呼ばれるビジンダー, Jigoku ni Yobareru Bijindā)
33. "Heartless Child Taking Gorilla's Tears: It's Tearful" (非情 子連れゴリラの涙・涙, Hijō Kotsure Gorira no Namida Namida)
34. "The Accursed Grandfather Clock: Bijinder is in Peril" (呪いの大時計 ビジンダー危機, Noroi no Ōdokei Bijindā Kiki)
35. "Kimono Maiden Bijinder: The Scrolling Picture of the Underworld" (振袖娘ビジンダー地獄絵巻, Furisode Bijindā Jigoku Emaki)
36. "The Suspiciousness of the Fourth-Dimension: The Terrifying Time Travel" (四次元の怪 恐怖のタイム旅行, Shijigen no Kai Kyōfu no Taimu Ryokō)
37. "Veteran Fencer: Waruder Comes Right Out of the Mist" (剣豪 霧の中から来たワルダー, Kengō Kiri no Naka kara Kita Warudā)
38. "The Mortal Device: The Three-Way Bloody Battle!!" (必殺の仕掛 血闘三つ巴!, Hissatsu no Shikake Chitō Mittsu Tomoe!)
39. "The Formidable Alien Enemy Arrives in a Flying Saucer" (強敵宇宙人は空飛ぶ円盤で来る, Kyōteki Uchūjin Soratobuenban de Kuru)
40. "Escape!! Freeze Bijinder in a Nick of Time" (脱出!!冷凍ビジンダー危機一髪, Dasshutsu!! Reitō Bijindā Kikīppatsu)
41. "Unequalled: The Dog Fighting Warship Blows Up!!" (天下無敵 空中戦艦爆破!!, Tenkamuteki Kūchūsen Kan Bakuha!!)
42. "The Comrade Attacks: Fire Off the Silhouette Gun" (同志討ち 火を噴く影法師銃, Dōshi Uchi Hi o Fuku Kagebōshi Jū)
43. "Bijinder is in Love with a Young Man" (ビジンダーに恋した若者, Bijindā ni Koi shita Wakamono)
44. "Bijinder's Beauty and Sorrow Separation" (ビジンダーの美しく悲しき別れ, Bijindā no Utsushiku Kanashiki Wakare)
45. "Samurai Waruder Dies in Dawn" (サムライワルダー暁に死す, Samurai Warudā Akatsuki ni Shishu)
46. "These Good Friends: Long Live the Androids!" (よいこの友達 人造人間万才!, Yoi Kono Tomodachi Jinzō Ningen Banzai!)

== Cast ==
- Ichiro (イチロー, Ichirō): Shunsuke Ikeda (池田 駿介, Ikeda Shunsuke)
- Jiro (ジロー, Jirō): Daisuke Ban (伴 大介, Ban Daisuke)
- (Gill) Hakaider (ハカイダー, Hakaidā; Voice): Shōzō Iizuka (飯塚 昭三, Iizuka Shōzō)
- Blue Hakaider (ブルーハカイダー, Burū Hakaidā; Voice): Setsuo Wakui (和久井 節緒, Wakui Setsuo)
- Red Hakaider (レッドハカイダー, Reddo Hakaidā; Voice): Teiji Ōmiya (大宮 悌二, Ōmiya Teiji)
- Silver Hakaider (シルバーハカイダー, Shirubā Hakaidā; Voice): Kōichi Ueda (上田 耕一, Ueda Kōichi)
- Akira (アキラ, Akira): Yoshihide Gotō (五島 義秀, Gotō Yoshihide)
- Rieko (リエコ, Rieko): Kazuyo Sumita (隅田 和世, Sumita Kazuyo)
- Gunta Momochi (百地 頑太, Momochi Gunta): Minoru Kuri (久里 みのる, Kuri Minoru)
- Shadow Knight (シャドウナイト, Shadō Naito; Voice): Masao Imanishi (今西 正男, Imanishi Masao; Episodes 8-16 & 20-22)
- Shadow Knight (シャドウナイト, Shadō Naito; Voice): Motomu Kiyokawa (清川 元夢, Kiyokawa Motomu; Episodes 17-19)
- Shadow Knight (シャドウナイト, Shadō Naito; Voice): Takeshi Watabe (渡部 猛, Watabe Takeshi; Episodes 23-27)
- Big Shadow (ビッグシャドウ, Biggu Shadō): Nobuo Yana (八名 信夫, Yana Nobuo)
- Big Shadow (ビッグシャドウ, Biggu Shadō; Silhouette Voice): Minoru Midorikawa (緑川 稔, Midorikawa Minoru)
- Misao (ミサオ, Misao): Hijiri Matsuki (松木 聖, Matsuki Hijiri)
- Hiroshi (ヒロシ, Hiroshi): Kiyotaka Ishī (石井 聖孝, Ishī Kiyotaka)
- Zadam (ザダム, Zadamu; Voice): Taimei Suzuki (鈴木 泰明, Suzuki Taimei)
- Zadam (ザダム, Zadamu; Voice): Masao Hosoi (細井 雅男, Hosoi Masao)
- Mari (マリ, Mari): Etsuko Shihomi (志穂美 悦子, Shihomi Etsuko)
- Bijinder (ビジンダー, Bijindā; Voice): Kotoe Taichi (太地 琴恵, Taichi Kotoe) (Played as Saiko Egawa (江川 菜子, Egawa Saiko))
- Waruder (ワルダー, Warudā; Voice): Takeshi Watabe (渡部 猛, Watabe Takeshi)
- Narrator (ナレーター, Narētā): Masāki Okabe (岡部 政明, Okabe Masāki)

== Media ==
=== OVA ===
An OVA version was released on June 30, 2003, called Kikaider 01: The Animation (キカイダー０１：THE ANIMATION, Kikaidā Zero Wan Ji Animēshon). It served as a sequel to Android Kikaider: The Animation.

=== Home Video ===
Released on DVD in Hawaii by JN Productions/Generation Kikaida in 2008 and SD Blu Ray by Discotek Media in 2025.

=== Kamen Rider 40th Anniversary ===
Kikaider 01, along with Kikaider, Inazuman, and Zubat made an appearance in the film OOO, Den-O, All Riders: Let's Go Kamen Riders (オーズ・電王・オールライダー レッツゴー仮面ライダー, Ōzu Den'ō Ōru Raidā: Rettsu Gō Kamen Raidā) in commemoration of the Kamen Rider's 40th anniversary and Toei Company's 60th anniversary in 2011. This brief appearance saw the four heroes destroy the Kamen Rider Stronger villain, General Shadow.
