= Android Kikaider =

Japanese superhero TV series

- Title card

Japanese name
- Kanji: 人造人間キカイダー
Transcriptions
- Revised Hepburn: Jinzō Ningen Kikaidā
- Genre: Action; Adventure; Superhero fiction
- Based on: Kikaider manga by Shotaro Ishinomori
- Developed by: Masaru Igami
- Screenplay by: Masaru Igami; Shūkei Nagasaka; Shoji Shimazu; Masayuki Shimada
- Directed by: Hidetoshi Kitamura
- Starring: Daisuke Ban; Hajime Izu; Jun Mizunoe; Masahiro Kamiya; Shun Ueda; Mitsuo Ando
- Narrated by: Masaaki Okabe
- Opening theme: "Go, Go, Kikaider!" by Yuki Hide
- Ending theme: "Tatakae, Jinzō Ningen" by Yuki Hide
- Composer: Michiaki Watanabe
- Country of origin: Japan
- Original language: Japanese
- No. of episodes: 43 (+1 special)

Production
- Producer: Tōru Hirayama
- Production companies: Toei Company; Ishimori Productions

Original release
- Network: TV Asahi
- Release: 8 July 1972 – 5 May 1973

Related
- Kikaider 01 (1973)

Android Kikaider (人造人間キカイダー, Jinzō Ningen Kikaidā) is a tokusatsu television series based on the superhero manga Kikaider by Shotaro Ishinomori. The show was produced by Toei Company and Ishimori Productions, and was broadcast in Japan on NET (now TV Asahi) from July 8, 1972, to May 5, 1973, with a total of 43 episodes.

This series was also one of the first tokusatsus to air in the United States (notably Hawaii), as Kikaida: Android of Justice, on KIKU-TV.

== Story ==
Dr. Kohmyoji is a scientist and an expert in robotics, who is being kept prisoner by the evil organization DARK. Dr. Kohmyoji creates Kikaider in order to protect his children from Professor Gill, the head of DARK. When Gill learns about this, he sends his androids to deal with Dr. Kohmyoji. Jiro (Kikaider) is able to rescue Dr. Kohmyoji's daughter, Mitsuko, but a fire separates him from Dr. Kohmyoji. Jiro is able to destroy Gray Rhino King but is unable to locate Dr. Kohmyoji, who is wandering away with amnesia.

The series mainly deals with the constant battle between Kikaider and the Destructroids. DARK pursues Dr. Kohmyoji and his children, Mitsuko and Masuru. Hanpei Hattori, a detective who provides comedy relief, helps them. During some battles, Professor Gill uses his evil flute to stop Jiro from becoming Kikaider. Jiro manages to find a way to drown out or block the sound of the flute. Dr. Kohmyoji (wandering with amnesia) is usually a figure in the background. Mitsuko and Masuru often talk to people who have encountered him but never manage to catch up with him. On occasion, when Kikaider is damaged, Dr. Kohmyoji manages to fix him, without quite knowing what he is doing.

Later in the series, Jiro is nearly overcome by Professor Gill's flute, and he attacks Dr. Kohmyoji. DARK captures Dr. Kohmyoji and makes it seem that Jiro killed him. Jiro is damaged and unable to speak and unable to defend himself. He is also pursued by the police. A new character appears, Hakaider. DARK forced Dr. Kohmyoji to build him and to place his own brain in the machine, under the control of an evil circuit, the opposite of Kikaider's conscience circuit. Kikaider fights the robot and is almost destroyed when Hakaider leaves suddenly. When Jiro finds out that Dr. Kohmyoji's brain is in Hakaider's body, he realizes that he will not be able to fight Hakaider.

Mitsuko and Masaru see a leather-clad man walking down the side of the building. This man is actually an android, Saburo. He says that he is the creation of Dr. Kohmyoji and that his job is to destroy Jiro, who he believes is now evil. Masaru allies himself with Saburo. Out of sight of Mitsuko and Masaru, Saburo reveals that he is actually Hakaider. He and Masaru pursue Jiro but realize he's still good when he surrenders.

The DARK androids capture Dr. Kohmyoji's children. Red Mine Toad destroys Kikaider, using a mine that is built into his body. Hattori collects the pieces of Kikaider's body. Hakaider goes crazy, because without Kikaider to fight, he has no reason to live. He destroys Red Mine Toad and attacks DARK. Hattori has found Mitsuko and Masaru and gives them the pieces of Kikaider. Mitsuko reassembles Kikaider. Gill convinces Hakaider to kill Dr. Kohmyoji, instead of attacking DARK. Hakaider locates Dr. Kohmyoji's body and finds the partially reassembled Kikaider. Hakaider refuses to fight a helpless enemy and allows Mitsuko to finish reassembling him. A rebuilt Jiro is unable to change into Kikaider, but he decides to lure Hakaider away to protect Dr. Kohmyoji and Kohmyoji's children.

Professor Gill sends White Bone Flying Squirrel against Hakaider and Hakaider loses the battle. Jiro gives the body of Hakaider to Mitsuko, who puts Dr. Kohmyoji's brain back into his body. Dr. Kohmyoji recovers, and is able to fix Jiro's change circuit. The Kohmyojis are again captured by DARK, but are rescued by Kikaider. Kikaider destroys White Bone Flying Squirrel, while Professor Gill, rather than be captured, destroys himself and the DARK base.

Dr. Kohmyoji leaves Japan and takes his kids with him, while Jiro decides to stay in Japan to work on improving himself.

== Characters ==
=== Heroes ===
- Jiro/Kikaider: An android created by Dr. Kohmyoji to stop DARK. He acts to protect Dr. Kohmyoji's children Mitsuko and Masaru. Since his conscience circuit is incomplete, Professor Gill's hypnotic flute causes him pain and is ultimately able to control him. He defends himself by overpowering its influence (for example, using a louder sound to drown it out). Jiro has a guitar, which he uses to announce his presence, and a motorcycle, which is called Sidemachine. He often defeats Destructoids by using his special attack called Denji Endo (Electro End). Jiro is played by Daisuke Ban in his human form while Toshiaki Kikuchi plays his robot form.
- Dr. Nobuhiko Kohmyoji: The creator of Kikaider. A top robotics expert, he was captured by DARK to help them build an army of murderous robot monsters. Secretly built Kikaider to not only protect his two children Mitsuko and Masaru, but to save the world. Dr. Kohmyoji is played by Hajime Izu.
- Mitsuko Kohmyoji: The daughter of Dr. Kohmyoji, the scientist who created Jiro. She develops feelings for Jiro and helps to repair him when he is damaged. Jiro tries to keep away from her to protect her feelings. Mitsuko Kohmyoji is played by Jun Mizunoe.
- Masaru Kohmyoji: The spunky younger brother of Mitsuko. Masaru Kohmyoji is played by Masahiro Kamiya.
- Hanpei "Hanpen" Hattori: A hysterically comical private investigator who befriends and helps Kikaider and his companions. He is a descendant of the famous real-life ninja Hanzō Hattori. Hanpei is derisively nicknamed "Hanpen" by his companions (hanpen is Japanese for "pounded fish cake"). Even the usually very polite Jiro will sometimes use the name Hanpen. He has a green Subaru 360. Hanpei "Hanpen" Hattori is played by Shun Ueda.

=== Villains ===
- Professor Gill: The leader of a terrorist organization called DARK. He kept Dr. Kohmyoji prisoner, and forced him to make destructive robots. Gill hates Kikaider, seeing him as a threat to his ambition, and wants to destroy him as a result. Gill used a flute that can control his DARK Destructoids (and causes pain to Jiro which prevents him from changing to Kikaider). Professor Gill is played by Mitsuo Ando.
- Saburo/Hakaider: Another android, considered as Jiro's "younger brother" as he was also made by Gill. While Jiro was made by Dr. Kohmyoji voluntarily, Saburo was one of the androids Kohmyoji was forced to make under the dominance of DARK to "correct" his mistake by destroying Kikaider. Unlike the other DARK Destructoids, Saburo is a cyborg. Gill had Dr. Kohmyoji's brain transplanted into the very android he created as his trump card against Jiro. Hakaider almost succeeded in killing Kikaider, but he was forced to stop fighting because he needs periodic blood transfusions from Dr. Kohmyoji's body. When White Bone Flying Squirrel defeated Hakaider, Mitsuko was able to return Kohmyoji's brain to his body. In the sequel show, Kikaider 01, Professor Gill's brain somehow wound up in Hakaider. Saburo often announces his presence by whistling. Saburo is played by Jouji Mayama for his human form but is voiced by Shōzō Iizuka in his robot form. Not to be confused with Saburo Yatsude, one of the pseudonyms used by Toei's production stuff.
- Android Men: Professor Gill's loyal android henchmen. Although vastly inferior to Destructoids they are capable of fighting and are often equipped with a naginata.
- Android Women: Professor Gill's 2nd loyal android henchmen. Although vastly inferior to Destructoids they are capable of fighting and are often equipped with a 2nd naginata.

=== Destructoids ===
- Gray Rhino King: Appears in episodes 1 and 14 and the Movie. Its Powers include strength, a retractable drill-like nasal horn, burrowing, can run up to 900 kilometers per hour, and can disguise itself as a human.
- Green Mantis: Appears in episodes 1, 2, and 14. Powers include a pair of launchable tentacle-like mantis arms called the Mantis Cut, a human disguise, and a chain in the left arm.
- Orange Ant: Appears in episodes 1, 3, and 14. Powers include purple formic acid spray from the arms called the Formic Acid Guns, telekinetic burrowing called the Ant Death Trap, and needle grenades in the right arm.
- Blue Buffalo: Appears in episodes 1, 4, and 14 and the Movie. Powers include swimming, explosive spikes from the back called the Buffalo Missiles, resistance to fire, projectiles, and electricity, a thick skull that can easily withstand 500 tons of force, and mouth flames.
- Yellow Jaguar: Appears in episodes 1, 5 and 14. Powers include a tail flamethrower called the Tail Fire that can fly if severed, a human disguise, and torso guns called the Body Gun.
- Black Horse: Appears in episodes 1, 6, and 14 and the Movie. Powers include a hot magnet that emits fire called the Electro-Disintegrator, speed, high jumping, fangs, and nasal winds called the Horse Hurricane.
- Blue Kong: Appears in episodes 1, 7, and 14 and the Movie. Powers include a launchable right wrist collar on a chain, body part separation, missiles from the neck collar, and mouth wind gusts and suction.
- Carmine Spider: Appears in episodes 1, 8 and 14. Powers include body webs called the Spider Threads, remotely controlling his hands if severed, tooth venom, and a web net called the Spider Net.
- Red Condor: Appears in episodes 1, 9 and 14. Powers include flight, a sharp beak, a red beak energy draining heat beam called the Condor Beam, shurikens from the wing tips called the Condor Shuriken, and launchable wings called the Condor Boomerangs.
- Scorpion Brown: Appears in episodes 1, 10, and 14. Powers include a drill on right hand scorpion claw, a Thermo-Luminescent Death Beam in the stinger tail, a human disguise, and a gun for the left hand called the Armstrong Gun.
- Gold Wolf: Appears in episodes 1, 11, 14 and 24. Powers include a human disguise named Moon Dew, launchable mace hands called the Wolf Bazooka, and a mouth heat beam called the Wolf Beam.
- Silver Cat: Appears in episodes 1, 12, 14 and 25 and the Movie. Powers include a human disguise, possession, launchable venomous claws, high jumping, and mouth flames called the Cat Fire.
- Pink Tiger: Appears in episodes 1, 13, 14 and 24. Powers include a gun each arm called the Tiger Gun, a remote controlled flying spiked bracelet called the Tiger Ring, mouth smokescreen called the Tiger Smoke Shield, and a wielding staff.
- Silver Tortoise: Appears in episode 14 and the Movie. Powers include flight when retracted into his shell, toxic white mist from the torso called the Tortoise Gas Bomb, hand claws called the Silver Turtle Claws, fifteen times the strength of his predecessors, bombs from the limb retraction sockets called the Pineapple Bombs and a retracted shell rolling mode called the Bowling Ball.
- Test Kikaider: Appears in episode 15. It has no real powers.
- Golden Bat: Appears in episode 15. Powers include a talon on each foot, flight, a human disguise, teleportation, and bright flashes from the head called the Bat Flash.
- Rouge Jellyfish: Appears in episode 16. Powers include swimming, spawning flying white jellyfish called Mini Poison Jellyfish, a remote controlled flying sword called the Jellyfish Sword, and a red smokescreen from the Head called the Jellyfish Smoke.
- Red Hornet: Appears in episode 17 and the Movie. Powers include flight, red toxic mist from the mouth, and a delusion venom stinger for each hand.
- Black Chameleon: Appears in episodes 18 and 25 and the Movie. Powers include invisibility, a missile launcher in each palm, a human disguise, and a constricting tail.
- King Crab Maroon: Appears in episodes 19 and 33. Powers include a human disguise, launchable daggers from the right arm called the King Crab Death Daggers, adhesive mouth foam called the King Crab Foam, and burrowing. His reconstructed form is armed with an electric Death Ray from the antennae.
- Blue Water Scorpion: Appears in episode 20. Powers include swimming, a pair of launchable head horns called the Blue Water Scorpion Sickle and Chain, claws tipped with skull seaweed poison called the Water Scorpion Poison, and blue toxic mist from the mouth called the Blue Water Scorpion Smoke.
- Purple Rat: Appears in episode 21. Powers include a pair of cone-like rockets on the nose called the Electroshock Rat Rockets, a pair of lamps in the neck called the Rat Photo-bomb Flash, a tentacle for the right arm called the Rat Guillotine, and toxic white mouth mist called the DARK Germ Gas.
- White Saw Shark: Appears in episode 22 and the Movie. Powers include flying saw discs from the head called the Flying Slicers, a launchable saw-like drill for the right called the Gyro Drill, and a tail-like left arm.
- Yellow Antlion Brothers: Appear in episode 23 and the Movie. Powers include burrowing, launchable head horns that fire electromagnetic waves and coated with rust, teleportation, emitting diamond dust from the head, controlling electromagnetism, and hydrofluoric acid from the head.
- Pink Armadillo: Appears in episode 24. Powers include a human disguise, rolling into a ball, and a whip for the left arm.
- Orange Snail: Appears in episode 25 and the Movie. Powers include rolling into a flight capable ball, spewing glue from the head, explosive flashes from the eyes, and hypnosis from the face swirl.
- Green Mammoth: Appears in episodes 25 and 26. Powers include freezing rust mist from the suction tentacle arms called the Mammoth Dry Gas, tentacle swings called the Mammoth Ultra-Chop, and teleportation.
- Violet Turbo: Appears in episode 27. Powers include teleportation, launchable body thorns called the Turbo Thorns, an acidic head tentacle disc called the Turbo Brand, and a human disguise.
- Green Sponge: Appears in episodes 27-29 and the Movie. Powers include teleportation, a detachable head called the Sponge Roller Ball, dividing and reforming, disguising himself as a sand pillar, cactus, or human, acidic slime called the Sponge Slime, teleportation, summoning vine armed cacti called the Sponge Cactus, and hand fire balls called the Sponge Fire Balls.
- Red Devil Stinger: Appears in episodes 27 and 28 and the Movie. Powers include explosive head darts coated with corrosive bacteria called the Devil Stinger Darts, teleportation, and swimming.
- Octopus Gold: Appears in episode 30 and the Movie. He vowed revenge on Jiro for killing Green Mammoth, Green Sponge, Violet Turbo and Red Devil Stinger. Powers include swimming, solidifying head ink called the Octopus Black, twin tentacle arms called the Octopus Wrap, and flight.
- Blue Electric Eel: Appears in episodes 30 and 31 and the Movie. He hears Octopus Gold's SOS, so he can avenge him. Powers include a human disguise, electric bolts from the antennae, and a pair of extendable eel-like arms called the Accordion Arms.
- Red Squid: Appears in episode 32 and the Movie. Powers include a launchable head called the Crimson Squid Flying Head that turn humans into small computers, a pair of squid whips on the wrists called the Crimson Squid Sucker Squeeze, mouth bombs called the Crimson Squid Shooter, enhanced hearing, and mental electric barriers.
- Red Mask Crab: Appears in episode 33 and the Movie. Powers include a sonic disruptor in the claws five times more powerful than King Crab Maroon's Death Ray, launchable crab legs on the head called the Jet Knives, and three guns in the abdomen called the Heat Guns.
- Black Echidna: Appears in episode 34 and the Movie. Powers include burrowing, launchable spines from the back called the Black Spiny Anteater Deadly Spines, finger missiles called the Black Spiny Anteater Missiles, a human disguise, and mouth sand called the Spiny Anteater Dust Storm.
- Tiny Echidna: Appears in episode 34 and the Movie. Her only known power is a human disguise.
- Black Crow: Appears in episode 35. Powers include commanding crows, flight, limb retraction, a launchable ax on a chain disguised as his tail called the Black Ax, missiles from the bridge of the nose, a nose drill, and reinforced armor.
- Multi Colored Sand Lizard: Appears in the Movie. Powers include long tongue, tail, missiles, and sand storm causing fans.
- Stag Beetle Blue: Appears in episode 36. Powers include detachable head pincers called the Flying Beetle Jaws, green eye beams called the Beetle Paralyzer, a sickle for each hand, and a torso blade.
- Starfish Purple: Appears in episodes 36-38. Powers include flight, a high body temperature, and hot sparks from under the eye called the Starfish Sparkler.
- Angler Brown: Appears in episode 39. Powers include hypnotic head lights, a mouth flamethrower called the Angler Torch, and a crushing bite attack called the Angler Gulp.
- Grasshopper Gray: Appears in episode 40. Powers include claw hands, launchable bladed wings called the Assassin Wings, and speakers in the abdomen that can amplify any sound 3000 times to form a sonic wave called the Grasshopper Mad Speakers.
- Red Mine Toad: Appears in episodes 41 and 42. Powers include burrowing, bombs in the abdomen called the Black Ball Bombs, exploding enemies on physical contact powered by a core in his torso, a long tongue, and 5000 degree mouth flames called the Inferno Hell.
- Skeleton Flying Squirrel: Appears in episodes 42 and 43. Powers include flight, sharp fangs called the Flying Squirrel Scrunch, explosive ribs called the Rib Fire Bombs, and teleportation.

== Episode list ==
1. "The Terrifying Grey Rhino King is a Messenger of Hell" (恐怖のグレイサイキングは地獄の使者, Kyōfu no Gurei Sai Kingu wa Jigoku no Shisha)
2. "The Mysterious Green Mantis is a Homicidal Fiend" (怪奇グリーンマンティスは殺人鬼, Kaiki Gurīn Mantisu wa Satsujinki)
3. "The Accursed Orange Ant's Deadly Challenge" (呪いオレンジアントの死の挑戦, Noroi Orenji Anto no Shino Chōsen)
4. "The Demonic Blue Buffalo Sets a Trap" (悪魔のブルーバッファローが罠をはる, Akuma no Burū Baffarō ga Wana o Haru)
5. "Yellow Jaguar's Demonic Hands Draw Near" (イエロージャガーの魔の手が迫る, Ierō Jagā no Ma no Te ga Semaru)
6. "Black Horse Waits in the Execution Zone" (ブラックホースが死刑場でまつ, Burakku Hōsu ga Shikeijō de Matsu)
7. "Monster Blue Kong's Great Rage" (怪物ブルスコングが大暴れ, Kaibutsu Burusu Kongu ga Ōabare)
8. "Carmine Spider Laughs Eerily" (カーマインスパイダーが不気味に笑う, Kāmain Supaidā ga Fukimi ni Warau)
9. "Agonizing Death! Calamity Bird Red Condor" (断末魔! 妖鳥レッドコンドル, Danmatsuma! Yōchō Reddo Kondoru)
10. "Scorpion Brown's Maddened by the Human Bombs" (サソリブラウン人間爆発に狂う, Sasori Buraun Ningen Bakuhatsu ni Kurū)
11. "Gold Wolf Howls in Hell" (ゴールドウルフが地獄に吠える, Gōrudo Urufu ga Jigoku ni Hoeru)
12. "The Cruel Witch Silver Cat" (残酷魔女シルバーキャット, Zankoku Majo Shirubā Kyatto)
13. "Pink Tiger Attacks the Amusement Park" (ピンクタイガーの遊園地襲撃, Pinku Taigā no Yūenchi Shūgeki)
14. "Great Devil Silver Turtle Summons 3 Monsters" (大魔神ギンガメが三怪物を呼ぶ, Daimajin Gin Game ga San Kaibutsu o Yobu)
15. "The Shadow of the Golden Bat's Curse" (キンイロコウモリ呪いの陰, Kin'iro Kōmori Noroi no Kage)
16. "The Woman Crimson Jellyfish Calls to the River Styx" (女ベニクラゲが三途の川へ招く, Onna Beni Kurage ga Sanzunokawa e Maneku)
17. "Red Hornet's Terrifying Prisoner Plan" (アカクマバチ恐怖の人質計画, Aka Kumabachi Kyōfu no Hitojichi Keikaku)
18. "Black Chameleon's Phantom Heist Strategy" (クロカメレオン幻の大強奪作戦, Kuro Kamereon Maboroshi no Dai Gōdatsu Sakusen)
19. "The Grim Reaper Beast Horseshoe Crab Rouge Appears!" (死神獣カブトガニエンジ参上!, Shinigami Jū Kabutogani Enji Sanjou!)
20. "The Ruthless Green Waterbug's Poison Plan!!" (冷酷アオタガメのドクロ計画!!, Reikoku Aota Game no Dokuro Keikaku!!)
21. "Brutality! Purple Rat's Poisonous Fangs" (残虐! ムラサキネズミの毒牙, Zangyaku! Murasaki Nezumi no Dokuga)
22. "White Sawshark's 12-Hour Nightmare" (シロノコギリザメ悪夢の12時間, Shiro Nokogirizame Akumu no Jū-Ni Jukan)
23. "The Three Yellow Antlion Brothers Appear!" (キイロアリジゴク三兄弟見参!, Kiiro Arijigoku San Kyōdai Kenzan!)
24. "Devilish Woman?? Pink Armadillo" (魔性の女?? モモイロアルマジロ, Majō no Onna?? Momoiro Arumajiro)
25. "Bitter-Orange Snail's Murderous Whistle" (ダイダイカタツムリ殺しの口笛, Daidai Katatsumuri Koroshi no Kuchibue)
26. "Green Mammoth's Earth-Freezing Strategy!!" (ミドリマンモス地球冷凍作戦!!, Midori Manmosu Chikyuu Reitō Sakusen!!)
27. "Violet Turban Shell's Evil Love" (バイオレットサザエの悪魔の恋, Baioretto Sazae no Akuma no Koi)
28. "Red Devil Stingfish Makes Babies Cry!" (赤子を泣かすアカオニオコゼ!, Akago o Nakasu Aka Oni Okoze!)
29. "Sponge Green Lives Thrice" (カイメングリーンは三度蘇える, Kaimen Gurīn wa Sando Yomigaeru)
30. "Red Squid Targets the Beautiful College Student" (アカネイカ美人女子大生を狙う, Akane Ika Bijin Joshidaisei o Nerau)
31. "Octopus Gold Calls for Jiro's Death" (ジローの死を呼ぶタコヤマブキ, Jirō no Shi o Yobu Tako Yamabuki)
32. "Blue Electric Eel's Evil Arms Glow" (アオデンキウナギ魔の腕が光る, Ao Denki Unagi Ma no Ude ga Hikaru)
33. "The Fiendish Demonface Crab Red's Cursed Law" (兇悪キメンガニレッド呪いの掟, Kyōaku Kimen Gani Reddo Noroi no Okite)
34. "The Child-Taking Monster Black Echidna" (子連れ怪物ブラックハリモグラ, Kotsure Kaibutsu Burakku Harimogura)
35. "The End of Jiro's Electromagnetic End!" (ジローデンジエンドの最期!, Jirō Denji Endo no Saigo!)
36. "Crazed Jiro Attacks Kohmyōji" (狂ったジローが光明寺をおそう, Kurutta Jirō ga Kōmyōji o Osou)
37. "Jiro's Younger Brother: The Formidable Enemy Hakaider!" (ジローの弟 強敵ハカイダー!, Jirō no Otōto Kyōteki Hakaidā!)
38. "Hakaider Kills Jiro!" (ハカイダーがジローを殺す!, Hakaidā ga Jirō o Korosu!)
39. "National Dragnet for Our Father's Enemy Jiro" (父の仇ジロー全国指名手配, Chichi no Kyū Jirō Zenkuni Shimeitehai)
40. "Look Out, Jiro! Complete Functional Shutdown!!" (危しジロー! 機能完全停止!!, Ayashi Jirō! Kinō Kanzen Teishi!!)
41. "Heroic Jiro Disintegrates in Midair!" (壮絶ジロー空中分解!, Souzetsu Jirō Kūchū Bunkai!)
42. "Transformation Impossible!? Hakaider's Great Treachery!" (変身不能!? ハカイダー大反逆!, Henshin Funō!? Hakaidā Dai Hangyaku!)
43. "The End of Jiro, or the Annihilation of Dark!?" (ジローの最後かダーク全滅か!?, Jirō no Saigo ka Dāku Zenmetsu ka!?)

== Cast ==
- Jiro (ジロー, Jirō): Daisuke Ban (伴 大介, Ban Daisuke)
- Dr. Kohmyōji (光明寺博士, Kōmyōji-Hakase): Hajime Izu (伊豆 肇, Izu Hajime)
- Mitsuko Kohmyōji (光明寺 ミツ子, Kōmyōji Mitsuko): Jun Mizunoe (水の江 じゅん, Mizunoe Jun)
- Masaru Kohmyōji (光明寺 マサル, Kōmyōji Masaru): Masahiro Kamiya (神谷 政浩, Kamiya Masahiro)
- Hanpei Hattori (服部 半平, Hattori Hanpei): Shun Ueda (植田 峻, Ueda Shun)
- Professor Gill (プロフェッサー・ギル, Purofessā Giru): Mitsuo Andō (安藤 三男, Andō Mitsuo)
- Saburo (サブロー, Saburō): Jōji Mayama (真山 譲次, Mayama Jōji)
- Hakaider (ハカイダー, Hakaidā; Voice): Shōzō Iizuka (飯塚 昭三, Iizuka Shōzō)
- Narrator (ナレーター, Narētā): Masaaki Okabe (岡部 政明, Okabe Masaaki)

== Songs ==
Opening theme

- "Go Go Kikaider" (ゴーゴー・キカイダー, Gō Gō Kikaidā)
  - Lyrics: Shōtarō Ishinomori
  - Composition & Arrangement: Chūmei Watanabe
  - Artist: Yuki Hide with Columbia Cradle Club

Ending theme

- "Fight! Android Kikaider" (戦え!!人造人間キカイダー, Tatakae! Jinzō Ningen Kikaidā)
  - Lyrics: Saburo Yatsude
  - Composition & Arrangement: Chūmei Watanabe
  - Artist: Yuki Hide with Columbia Cradle Club

== Media ==
=== Films ===
- Flying At 'Ya, Android Kikaider (飛び出す人造人間キカイダー, Tobidasu Jinzô Ningen Kikaidâ) was a 33 minute 3-D film that was released on March 17, 1973. It was titled The Kikaida 3D Movie in Hawaii. Professor Gill created a machine that allowed him to restore destroyed robots. This machine is used to recreate the Destructoids that Kikaider had destroyed. Kikaider is forced to destroy them all once again. On October 21, 2022, It was released via Toei Tokusatsu World Official on YouTube to commemorate the channel's 400k subscribers and the series' 50th anniversary with English sub (albeit lacking 3D) for the first time until December 28.
- Mechanical Violator Hakaider (人造人間ハカイダー, Jinzō Ningen Hakaidā) was a 77-minute film produced by Bandai and Toei featuring the deadly rival of Kikaider and anti-hero, Hakaider. The anti-hero's opponent, Michael, is implied to be Kikaider himself.
- Kikaider Reboot, a 2014 film retelling of the original series, was released on May 24, 2014. The film featured redesigned versions of Kikaider and Hakaider. These characters made guest appearances in the 30th episode of Kamen Rider Gaim, like Space Sheriff Gavan in Tokumei Sentai Go-Busters, to promote the film.

==== Kamen Rider 40th Anniversary ====
Kikaider, along with Kikaider 01, Inazuman, and Zubat made an appearance in the film OOO, Den-O, All Riders: Let's Go Kamen Riders (オーズ・電王・オールライダー レッツゴー仮面ライダー, Ōzu Den'ō Ōru Raidā: Rettsu Gō Kamen Raidā) in commemoration of the Toei Company's 60th anniversary in 2011. This brief appearance saw the four heroes destroy the Kamen Rider Stronger villain, General Shadow.

=== Anime ===
An anime adaptation called Android Kikaider: The Animation (人造人間キカイダー THE ANIMATION, Jinzō Ningen Kikaidā Ji Animēshon) was released on October 16, 2000, and ended on January 8, 2001. The anime has differences from the original version and it is more faithful to the original manga by Shotaro Ishinomori.

== Sequel ==
A direct sequel to the first tokusatsu series called Kikaider 01 was released on May 12, 1973, and ended March 30, 1974. It introduced the new titular character Kikaider 01 along with the return of Hakaider under the control of Professor Gill.

== Home video ==
• The show was released on Region 1 DVDs by JN Productions/Generation Kikaida in 2003 and 2004 in 9 Volume Sets. However, following Generation Kikaida’s closure in 2023, their DVDs have since been out-of-print.

• In 2024, Discotek Media announced that they had licensed Android Kikaider with plans to re-release the full 43 episode series on Blu-Ray later that same year remastered in HD, along with a brand new English-subtitle translation and loads of extras included on the set.
