= Shōzō Iizuka =

Japanese actor (1933–2023)

- 飯塚 昭三
- Born: May 23, 1933; Fukushima Prefecture, Empire of Japan
- Died: February 15, 2023 (aged 89)
- Occupations: Actor; voice actor; narrator
- Years active: 1950–2023
- Agent: Sigma Seven

Shōzō Iizuka (飯塚 昭三, Iizuka Shōzō; May 23, 1933 – February 15, 2023) was a Japanese actor, voice actor and narrator from Fukushima Prefecture. He graduated from the fine arts department of Nihon University.

He is most known for the roles of Hakaider (Android Kikaider), Doctor Neo Cortex (Crash Bandicoot), Great King Mons Drake Of The Planet (Tensou Sentai Goseiger), 38 out of 50 Vader Monsters (Denshi Sentai Denjiman), Ryu Jose (Mobile Suit Gundam), Heart (Fist of the North Star), Happosai Ueda (Nintama Rantarou), Nappa (Dragon Ball Z) and Sergeant Bosco Albert "B.A." Baracus (Japanese dub of The A-Team). He played major villain roles in the first eight Metal Hero Series.

== Death ==
Iizuka died from acute heart failure at the age of 89 on February 15, 2023.

== Filmography ==
=== Television animation ===
1965

- Astro Boy
- Gigantor
- Wolf Boy Ken

1970

- Tomorrow's Joe (Tiger Ozaki, Gerira, others)

1975

- Brave Raideen (Kyoretsu Gekido)

1977

- Voltes V (Jangal)

1978

- Daimos (Balbas, Isamu Ryūzaki)

1979

- Mobile Suit Gundam (Ryu Jose)

1980

- Space Emperor God Sigma (Shiwai Ritsu)

1981

- Urusei Yatsura (Daimajin)

1982

- Rainbowman (Dongoros)
- Space Adventure Cobra (Dan Brad)

1983

- Fushigi no Kuni no Alice (Humpty Dumpty)

1984

- Fist of the North Star (Heart, Fudou of the Mountain)
- Sherlock Hound (Inspector Lestrade)

1986

- Dragon Ball (Android #8)

1987

- Metal Armor Dragonar (Chephov, Dorchenov)

1988

- Sakigake!! Otokojuku (Raiden)

1989

- Dragon Ball Z (Nappa, Android #8)
- Idol Densetsu Eriko (Kōsuke Tamura)

1990

- Brave Exkaiser (Dinogeist)
- NG Knight Lamune & 40 (Don Harumage)

1991

- Future GPX Cyber Formula (Tetsuichirō Kurumada)

1992

- Tekkaman Blade (Honda)

1993

- Ghost Sweeper Mikami (Santa Claus, Gondawara)
- Nintama Rantarō (Happosai Ueda)
- YuYu Hakusho (Enki)

1994

- Tekkaman Blade II (Honda)

1995

- Street Fighter II V (Dhalsim)

1996

- Detective Conan (Tatsuji Kuroiwa)
- Rurouni Kenshin (Hyottoko)

1997

- Kindaichi Case Files (Shūichirō Midō)

1998

- Lost Universe (Jill Il)
- Yu-Gi-Oh! (Toei) (Kujirada, Dark Master Zorc)

1999

- Pokémon (Tadokoro)

2002

- Monkey Typhoon (Gantz)

2003

- Ashita no Nadja (Head pirate)
- Planetes (Goro Hoshino)

2004

- Monster (Tomāshu Zoback)
- Paranoia Agent (Keiichi Ikari)
- Pokémon Advanced Generation (Aoba, Genji)
- Samurai Champloo (Zuikō)

2005

- Black Jack (Doctor Asakusa)
- Gun X Sword (Tony)

2006

- Black Jack 21 (Dr. Kuma)
- Ōban Star-Racers (Kross)
- Utawarerumono (Genjimaru)
- Yomigaeru Sora - Rescue Wings (Motomura)

2007

- Deltora Quest (Soldeen)
- Devil May Cry (Pleshio)
- Shugo Chara! (Gozen)
- Doraemon (Mokke)

2008

- One Outs (Yuuzaburou Mihara)
- Soul Eater (Alcapone)
- Stitch! (Dr. Jumba Jookiba)

2009

- Bleach (Baraggan Luisenbarn)
- Fullmetal Alchemist: Brotherhood (Dominic)
- Stitch! ~Itazura Alien no Daibōken~ (Jumba)

2010

- Stitch! ~Zutto Saikō no Tomodachi~ (Jumba)

2012

- K (Daikaku Kokujōji)

2013

- Hajime no Ippo: Rising (Kamogawa Genji)

2014

- Sword Art Online II (Thrym)

2015

- K: Return of Kings (Daikaku Kokujōji)
- Yo-kai Watch ("Komasan's exploration team" narrator)

2017

- Little Witch Academia (Fafnir (ep. 5))
- Onihei (Hikojū)
- Time Bokan 24 (Leonardo da Vinci (ep. 24))

2018

- Puzzle & Dragons X (Teradoragon (ep. 89))
- The Seven Deadly Sins: Revival of The Commandments (Demon King (ep. 21))

2019

- Carole & Tuesday (Fire Brothers)

2020

- White Cat Project: Zero Chronicle (Bal)

=== Original video animation (OVA) ===
- Future GPX Cyber Formula OVAs (Tetsuichirou Kurumada)
- Getter Robo Armageddon (Benkei Kurama)
- Giant Robo (Tetsugyu)
- Legend of the Galactic Heroes (Hans Dietrich von Seeckt)
- Mobile Suit Gundam MS IGLOO (Martin Prochnow)
- Yotoden (OAV) (Ongyo no Kiheiji)

=== Film animation ===
- Memories Iwanofu
- Royal Space Force: The Wings of Honneamise (Space Force Trainer)
- Mystery of Mamo (1978) (Flinch)
- Dragon Ball: Curse of the Blood Rubies (1986) (Pansy's Dad)
- Dragon Ball Z: Lord Slug (1991) (Kakūja)
- Street Fighter II: The Animated Movie (1994) (Thunder Hawk)
- Dragon Ball: The Path to Power (1996) (Artificial Human #8 (8-chan))
- Millennium Actress (2001) (Genya Tachibana)
- Tokyo Godfathers (2003) (Ota)
- Professor Layton and the Eternal Diva (2009) (Curtis O'Donnell)
- Resident Evil: Damnation (2012) (Ivan Judanovich / Ataman)
- Doraemon: New Nobita's Great Demon—Peko and the Exploration Party of Five (2014) (Daburanda)
- Kingsglaive: Final Fantasy XV (2016) (Iedolas Aldercapt)

=== Video games ===
- Bloody Roar Extreme (Ganesha / Golan Draphan)
- Crash Bandicoot series (Doctor Neo Cortex (Brendan O'Brien, Clancy Brown, Lex Lang)) (Japanese dub)
- Dragon Ball Z: Budokai series (Nappa)
- Dragon Ball Z: Budokai Tenkaichi series (Nappa)
- Final Fantasy XV (Iedolas Aldercapt)
- Genji: Dawn of the Samurai (Fujiwara no Hidehira)
- Genji: Days of the Blade (Fujiwara no Hidehira)
- God of War III (Cronos (George Ball)) (Japanese dub)
- Hokuto no Ken series (Mr. Heart)
- Kingdom Hearts Birth by Sleep (Dr. Jumba Jookiba)
- Klonoa Heroes: Densetsu no Star Medal (Pango)
- Lego Batman 3: Beyond Gotham (Solomon Grundy (Fred Tatasciore)) (Japanese dub)
- Mega Man 8 (Dr. Thomas Light)
- Mega Man Battle & Chase (Guts Man, Doctor Light)
- Mega Man Legends 2 (Bancoscus)
- Metal Gear Solid 2: Sons of Liberty (Peter Stillman)
- Metal Gear Solid 4: Guns of the Patriots (Ed, Psycho Mantis, Beast unit's voice)
- Ninja Gaiden 2 (Dagra Dai)
- Odin Sphere (Brigand, Belial)
- Policenauts (Ed Brown)
- Rogue Galaxy (Dorgengoa)
- Saint of Braves Baan Gaan (Grandark)
- Shining Force Neo (Graham)
- Shinobido: Way of the Ninja (Kagetora Akame)
- Sly 2: Band of Thieves (Jean Bison) (Japanese dub)
- Street Fighter Alpha 3 (Thunder Hawk)
- Super Adventure Rockman (Dr. Thomas Light)
- Tales of Destiny (Grebaum)
- Tales of Hearts (Zirconia)
- The Space Sheriff Spirits (Don Horror, Psycho, Khubirai)
- Utawarerumono (Genjimaru)

=== Tokusatsu ===
- Himitsu Sentai Gorenger (1975-1977) – Crescent Moon Mask / Wing Mask / Horn Mask / Sword Mask / General Iron Mask Temujin / Fire Mountain Mask General Magman / Great General Golden Mask
- J.A.K.Q. Dengekitai (1977) – Devil Killer / Devil Drill / Devil Mite / Devil Wrestler / Devil Wolf / Devil Mummy / Devil Ball / Aringam General / Captain Ghost / Mantis Tribal Chiefn / Cobra Shinto Priest / Shachira Sweat / Chameleon Ieader / Icarus King
- Battle Fever J (1979-1980) – Satan Egos
- Denshi Sentai Denjiman (1980-1981, majority of episodes) – Musasabilar / Shabonlar / Chikagerilar / Tsutakazular / Higekitakolar / Umitsular / Firumular / Denwalar / Hambular / Taiyajikolar / Balar / Adobaloolar / Samelar / Deadbolar / Kaigalar / Gamalar / Hachidokular / Taimular / Kokelar / Hamigakilar / Medamalar / Rekolar / Kilar / Nazolar / Sabimushilar / Chōchinlar / Noranekolar / Kamakilar / Akumalar / Pikarilar / Jishinlar / Ninpolar / Onilar / Torikagolar / Botolar / Sakkalar / Karakurilar / Banriki Monster
- Denshi Sentai Denjiman The Movie (1980) – Ankolar
- Taiyo Sentai Sun Vulcan (1981-1982) – President Hell Satan
- Dengeki Sentai Changeman (1985) – Jeeg / Savoo
- Gokiraagin, Butarugin, Scarabgin, Goriwashigin (Voice: Yutaka Ohyama), Sasorinamazugin in Chikyu Sentai Fiveman
- Kyōryū Sentai Zyuranger (1992) – Dora Goldhorn
- Gekisou Sentai Carranger (1996) – PP Chiipuri
- Seijuu Sentai Gingaman (1998) – Morgumorgu
- Hyakujuu Sentai Gaoranger vs. Super Sentai (2001) – Rakuushaa
- GoGo Sentai Boukenger: The Greatest Precious (2006) – Hyde Gene
- Kamen Rider Black (1987-1988) – Gorgom High Priest Darom / Great Mutant Darom
- Kamen Rider Black RX (1998-1989) – Naval Commander Bosgun
- Kamen Rider J (1994) – Earth Spirit / Narrator
- OOO, Den-O, All Riders: Let's Go Kamen Riders (2011) – High Priest Darom and King Dark
- Wirepullers of Smart Brain in Kamen Rider 555: Paradise Lost (voice of Gorō Naya & Seizō Katō)
- Space Sheriff Gavan (1982, eps. 1-10) – Don Horror
- Space Sheriff Sharivan (1983-1984) – Demon King Psycho
- Kamen Rider × Super Sentai × Space Sheriff: Super Hero Taisen Z (2013) – Demon King Psycho
- Space Sheriff Shaider (1984-1985) – Lord Kublai
- Kyojuu Tokusou Juspion (1985-1986) – Satan Ghos
- Jikuu Senshi Spielban (1986-1987) – General Deathzero
- Choujinki Metalder (1987-1988) – Battle Robot Army General Doranga
- Sekai Ninja Sen Jiraiya (1988-1989) – Org Ninja Dokusai
- Doctor Giba in Kidou Keiji Jiban (played by Leo Meneghetti)
- Alien Toad (Leader), Alien Genoss in Spectreman
- Avatar Demon King Debonoba (ep16 – 18) in Kaiketsu Lion-Maru
- Alien Gorgon in Silver Mask
- Kumondes in Suki! Suki!! Majo Sensei
- Barom-1 (1972) – Majin Doruge
- Android Kikaider (1972, eps. 36-43) – Hakaider
- Kikaider 01 (1973) – Gilu Hakaider / Black Dragon
- Inazuman (1973) – Emperor Banba / Flame Fighter
- Alien Virenus in Fireman
- Mr. Asumodi in Dengeki!! Strada 5
- Garba, Sairen in Akumaizer 3
- Seigi no Symbol Condorman (1975) – King Monster
- Space Ironman Kyodain (1976) – Death Gutter
- Ganbaron (1977) – Dowarugin
- Big Sam (Actor: Sugiyama Thunder) in Message from Space
- Machine Bem (majority of episodes) in Spider-Man
- Black Danger Demon King in Red Tiger
- Kapetan in Batten Robomaru
- Dinosaur Hachi in Robot 8 Chan
- Golden Monsu in Seiun Kamen Machineman
- Temple Mirror in Dokincho！ Nemurin
- Legend Teru teru bōzu in Mysterious girl Nile Thutmose
- Zodiac (Actor: Tenmei Basara) in Shichisei Tōshin Guyferd
- Emperor Genbah in Voicelugger
- Great King Mons Drake of the Planet (eps. 1 – 15) in Tensou Sentai Goseiger
- M1 in Ultraman X
- Alexander Icon in Kamen Rider 1

=== Dubbing roles ===
==== Live-action ====
- Alien (1980 Fuji TV edition) – Parker (Yaphet Kotto)
- The A-Team – Sgt. Bosco Albert "B.A." Baracus (Mr. T)
- Batman (1995 TV Asahi edition) – Lieutenant Eckhardt (William Hootkins)
- Bean – George Grierson (Harris Yulin)
- The Big Brawl (Judge #2)
- Bird on a Wire (1993 TV Asahi edition) – Raun (Alex Bruhanski)
- Black Christmas (1982 Fuji TV edition) – John Graham (Leslie Carlson)
- The 'Burbs (1992 TV Asahi edition) – Uncle Reuben Klopek (Brother Theodore)
- Colors (1991 TV Asahi edition) – Leo "Frog" Lopez (Trinidad Silva)
- The Cotton Club (1988 TBS edition) – Joe Flynn (John P. Ryan)
- Dance with Me – John Burnett (Kris Kristofferson)
- Demolition Man (1997 TV Asahi edition) – Associate Bob (Glenn Shadix)
- The Departed – Arnold French (Ray Winstone))
- The Exorcist (1980 TBS edition) – Pazuzu (Mercedes McCambridge)
- Ghostbusters (1989 TV Asahi edition) – Police Commissioner (Norman Matlock)
- Ghostbusters II (1992 Fuji TV edition) – Vigo (Max von Sydow)
- Glory (1994 NTV edition) – Sergeant Major Mulcahy (John Finn)
- The Gumball Rally (1980 TBS edition) – Steve Smith (Tim McIntire)
- The Hudsucker Proxy – Waring Hudsucker (Charles Durning)
- Hooper (1984 TV Asahi edition) – Roger Deal (Robert Klein)
- Indiana Jones and the Last Crusade (1994 NTV edition) – Sallah (John Rhys-Davies)
- Jacob's Ladder – Louis Denardo (Danny Aiello)
- The Living Daylights (1993 TBS edition) – General Leonid Pushkin (John Rhys-Davies)
- Magnum Force (1987 TV Asahi edition) – Pimp (Albert Popwell)
- Master of the Flying Guillotine – Nai Man (Sham Chin-bo)
- Me, Myself & Irene – Colonel Partington (Robert Forster)
- Mississippi Burning (1992 TV Asahi edition) – Sheriff Ray Stuckey (Gailard Sartain)
- Monty Python's Flying Circus – Terry Jones
- The Mummy Returns – High Priest Imhotep (Arnold Vosloo)
- The NeverEnding Story (Rockbiter (Alan Oppenheimer))
- Only When I Laugh (1989 TV Asahi edition) – Jimmy Perrino (James Coco)
- Piranha (1982 TBS edition) – Mr. Dumont (Paul Bartel)
- Predator (1989 Fuji TV edition) – Billy (Sonny Landham)
- Raise the Titanic (1982 Fuji TV edition) – Captain Andre Prevlov (Bo Brundin)
- Raw Deal (1988 TBS edition) – Steven Hill (Martin Lamanski)
- Revenge (1991 TV Asahi edition) – The Texan (James Gammon)
- The Rocketeer – Eddie Valentine (Paul Sorvino)
- Rocky III (1987 TBS edition) – Clubber Lang (Mr. T)
- The Running Man (1989 Fuji TV edition) – Dynamo (Erland Van Lidth De Jeude)
- Ted – Frank (Bill Smitrovich)
- Ted 2 – Frank (Bill Smitrovich))
- Three Days of the Condor (1980 TV Asahi edition) – Mailman (Hank Garrett)
- Thunderbirds Are Go – The Hood
- Thunderbird 6 – Black Phantom

==== Animation ====
- Aladdin (Mud Sultan)
- An American Tail (Moe)
- Babes in Toyland (Goblin King)
- Batman: Assault on Arkham (King Shark)
- Batman: The Animated Series (Garth)
- The Black Cauldron (The Horned King)
- G.I. Joe: The Movie (Golobulus, Snow Job)
- Lilo & Stitch franchise (Dr. Jumba Jookiba)
- My Little Pony: Friendship Is Magic (Ahuizotl)
- The Black Cauldron (The Horned King)
- The New Adventures of Winnie the Pooh (Crud)
- The Year Without a Santa Claus (Mayor)
- Timon and Pumbaa (Uncle Boaris)
- Treasure Planet (Billy Bones)
- Up (Carl Fredricksen)
  - Carl's Date (Carl Fredricksen)
- VeggieTales (Mr. Nezzer)
- We're Back! A Dinosaur's Story (Woog)
- X-Men (TV Tokyo edition) (Juggernaut)

=== Other ===
- Tokyo Disneyland Cinderella Castle Mystery Tour (Voice of the Horned King)

== Accolades ==
- Merit Award at the Tokyo Anime Awards Festival 2022
