= Kikaider =

Television series

キカイダー
- Genre: Superhero, sci-fi
- Created by: Shotaro Ishinomori
- Manga
- Written by: Shotaro Ishinomori
- Published by: Shogakukan
- Magazine: Bessatsu Shōnen Sunday → Weekly Shōnen Sunday
- Original run: 1972 – 1974
- Volumes: 6
- Manga

Kikader: Code 02
- Written by: Meimu
- Published by: Kadokawa Shoten
- Magazine: Monthly Ace Next → Monthly Shōnen Ace
- Original run: 2001 – 2006
- Volumes: 7
- Manga

Inazuman vs. Kikaider
- Written by: Meimu
- Published by: Kadokawa Shoten
- Magazine: Monthly Shōnen Ace
- Original run: 2004 – 2005
- Volumes: 2

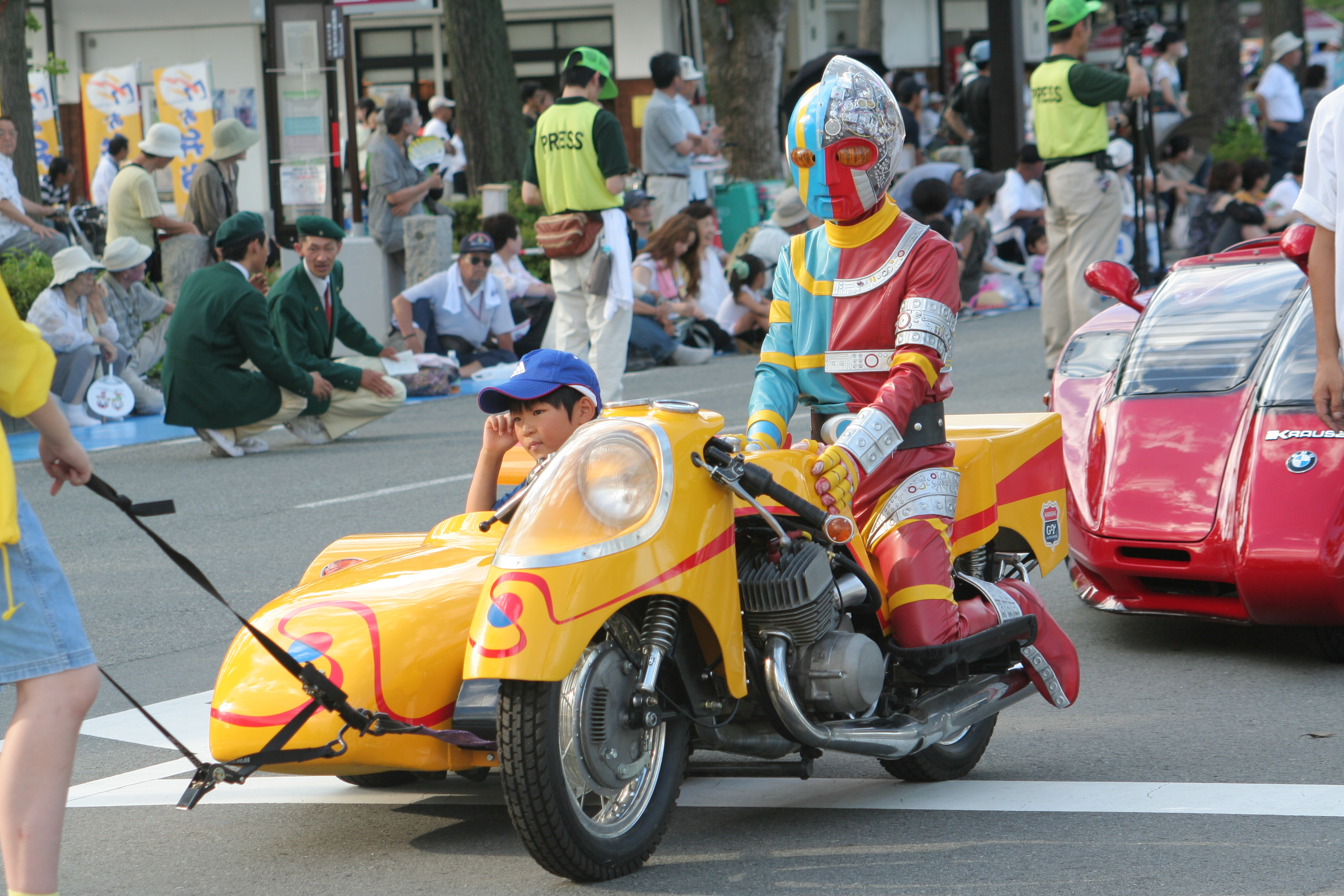

Kikaider (Japanese: キカイダー, Hepburn: Kikaidā) is a manga series written and illustrated by Shotaro Ishinomori. A two-season tokusatsu series titled Android Kikaider (Kikaider 01 in season 2) was produced by Toei Company and Ishimori Productions in early 1970s. A 18-episode anime series based on the manga was created by Radix in early 2000s. The tokusatsu series from 1972 is especially popular in Hawaii.

The anime series aired in the United States on Cartoon Network's Adult Swim Action in 2003. The complete DVD series was available with English subtitles through JN Productions.

== Publication ==
The manga series was serialized in Bessatsu Shōnen Sunday (and later Weekly Shōnen Sunday) from 1972 to 1974, with its chapters collected into 6 tankōbon volumes.

A remake of the original manga called Kikaider: Code 02 (キカイダー / CODE.02, Kikaidā Kōdo Zero Tsū; pronounced as "Kikaider Code Zero Two") showing more detailed illustrations compared to the simple design of the original manga was released with a total of 7 tankōbon volumes published by Kadokawa Shoten. The story was written and illustrated by Meimu. The manga was licensed by CMX Manga for the English version.

Another remake created by Meimu is Inazuman vs. Kikaider (イナズマンVSキカイダー, Inazuman Bui Esū Kikaidā). The manga serves as an alternate sequel to Kikaider: Code 02. The manga was based on Inazuman chapter "The Boy with the Guitar" and mainly follows Inazuman's story.

=== Volumes ===
Original series

No.	Japanese release date	Japanese ISBN
1	December 1972	978-4-253-06316-6
2	February 1973	978-4-253-06317-3
3	May 1973	978-4-253-06318-0
4	January 1974	978-4-253-06319-7
5	May 1974	978-4-253-06320-3
6	August 1974	978-4-253-06321-0

== Adaptations ==
The 2014 iteration of the character made an appearance in episode 30 of the TV series Kamen Rider Gaim.

=== Television ===
- Android Kikaider (1972)
- Kikaider 01 (1973)

=== Film ===
- Mechanical Violator Hakaider (1995)
- Kikaider Reboot (2014)

=== Anime ===
- Android Kikaider: The Animation (2000–01) (TV series)
- Kikaider 01: The Animation (2001) (4-part OVA)
- The Boy Who Carried a Guitar: Kikaider Vs. Inazuman (2002) (OVA special)

== Superhero safety ==
In the past, the Super Giant movie series and shows like Moonlight Mask (the first TV superhero in Japan) became controversial when younger viewers began imitating the stunts performed. The original Android Kikaider series was one of the first tokusatsu superhero TV shows to add safety bumpers at the end of each episode, warning viewers not to imitate the stunts performed by its superhero.
