= Android Kikaider: The Animation =

Japanese anime television series

人造人間キカイダー THE ANIMATION (Jinzō Ningen Kikaidā The Animation)
- Genre: Sci-fi, mecha, drama
- Anime television series
- Directed by: Tensai Okamura
- Written by: Akemi Omode
- Music by: Akira Mitake
- Studio: Radix & Studio OX
- Licensed by: NA: Bandai Entertainment
- Original network: Kids Station
- English network: US: Adult Swim
- Original run: October 16, 2000 – January 8, 2001
- Episodes: 13
- Original video animation

Kikaider 01: The Animation
- Directed by: Keitaro Motonaga
- Written by: Toshizo Nemoto; Shinsuke Onishi
- Music by: Kaoru Wada
- Studio: Radix Ace & Studio OX
- Licensed by: NA: Bandai Entertainment
- Released: November 21, 2001 – March 20, 2002
- Runtime: 24 minutes
- Episodes: 4
- Original video animation

The Boy with the Guitar: Kikaider vs. Inazuman
- Directed by: Naoyuki Konno
- Written by: Shinsuke Onishi
- Music by: Kaoru Wada
- Studio: Radix Ace & Studio OX
- Released: September 19, 2003
- Runtime: 25 minutes

Android Kikaider: The Animation (人造人間キカイダー THE ANIMATION, Jinzō Ningen Kikaidā Ji Animēshon) is an anime adaptation of the Japanese superhero Kikaider. The series was produced by Sony Pictures Entertainment Visual Works (now Aniplex) and Ishimori Entertainment, and animated by Radix (later Radix Ace) and Studio OX. It was broadcast on Kids Station from October 16, 2000, to January 8, 2001, with a total of 13 episodes. The anime followed more of the manga, with a darker nature of Jiro's reason to exist.

It was followed by the OVA 4-episode sequel called. Kikaider 01: The Animation (キカイダー01 THE ANIMATION, Kikaidā Zero Wan Ji Animēshon).

An OVA special came with the Kikaider 01 DVD called The Boy with the Guitar: Kikaider vs. Inazuman (ギターを持った少年 -キカイダーVSイナズマン-, Gitā o motta shōnen - kikaidā VS inazuman -) which teamed Kikaider with Inazuman, another superhero created by Shotaro Ishinomori. It was based on the manga chapter of Inazuman called The Boy with the Guitar (ギターを持った少年, Gitā o motta shōnen).

An English dubbed version of the anime and OVA aired on Cartoon Network's Adult Swim programming block in the United States, with the exception of episode 8, which was a recap episode. The final OVA special (Kikaider vs. Inazuman) was never dubbed or released outside of Japan.

== Plot ==
=== Android Kikaider ===
Dr. Kohmyoji creates Jiro (Kikaider) but an explosion occurs. When Dr. Kohmyoji's kids, Mitsuko and Masaru, their father was nowhere to be found, Jiro wandering aimlessly in a remote area eventually meets Mitsuko. Mitsuko teaches Jiro to go into his robot form and about the GEMINI system inside him. The two grow closer together but the relationship development halts when a mysterious flute playing causes Jiro to attack Mitsuko, which causes her to believe he is a mad machine. Jiro inevitably leaves Mitsuko and Masaru in fear of being destroyed. Mitsuko then hires Hanpei Hattori and his apprentice Etsuko Sarutobi to find Jiro and bring him home. Throughout the story, Jiro encounters robots and learns more about Professor Gill and the evil organization DARK. A reoccurring android named Hakaider causes Jiro out of control by whistling (similar to Gill's flute). The more Mitsuko encounters Jiro the more she falls in love with him. When Mitsuko and Jiro reunite, they search for Mistuko's mother who is revealed to be in love with Professor Gill but could not bare the pain of being away from her children and gives them the location to Professor Gill's headquarters right before she killed herself. After they discover the location, Jiro attempts to fight Hakaider alone and also discovers the brain inside Hakaider's head is that of Dr. Kohmyoji's. Dr. Kohmyoji overtakes Hakaider's body before Hakaider could destroy it and infiltrates the headquarters. Once Professor Gill discovers Dr. Kohmyoji is in control he sends his robots to attack them. Jiro was able to give the brain to Hanpei in order to put it back into Dr. Kohmyoji's body. Professor Gill attempts to control Jiro with his flute, but Jiro to is able to overcome it. Hakaider then attempts to kill Professor Gill for betraying him and destroys the place along with Gill. Hanpei, Mitsuko and Etsuko able to escape, but didn't see Jiro escape with them. In the end, Mitsuko has hope that Jiro will return to them.

=== Kikaider 01 ===
These four OVAs directly follow the conclusion of the 13 episode TV series. Jiro is now battling to save Akira, the son of Professor Gill who survived and transplanted his brain into Hakaider. Gill-Hakaider, supported by the Hakaider Squad and later SHADOW, targets Akira to power his giant-robot Armageddon Lord. Jiro meets his two "older" brothers Ichiro (Kikaider 01) and Rei (Kikaider 00), who lack Jiro's GEMINI system, and are joined by a SHADOW gynoid Bjinder. In the end, Gill successfully captures Akira, and uses the Armageddon Lord to devastate the city from the previous series. Gill plants a submission chip inside Jiro and his android allies. But it unexpectedly subdues Jiro's GEMINI circuit rather than enslave him, making Jiro more human as he ends up destroying his brothers and kills Gill as the Armageddon Lord's generator explodes. Jiro leaves Akira in the hands of a monk scientist that raised Ichiro and reactivated Rei. Afterwards, Jiro then proclaims that having now committed such horrible acts that he is now human and that his heart will forever be in "eternal conflict" as he walks alone into the sunset.

=== The Boy Who Carried a Guitar: Kikaider vs. Inazuman ===
Set sometime after Kikaider 01, the cast of the Inazuman manga have a run-in with Jiro after one of their psychic adversaries possesses him in an attempt to murder Saburo, the protagonist of the Inazuman story. As the fight spirals out of control, Jiro's fight for inner peace comes to a head via Saburo's telepathy. The climax of the battle results in Jiro's definitive answers to the questions posed by his autonomy.

== Voice Cast ==
Character	Japanese voice actor	English voice actor
Jiro/Kikaider	Tomokazu Seki	Dave Wittenberg
Rei/Kikaider-00	Kazuhiko Inoue	Crispin Freeman
Mieko/Bijinder	Mitsuko Horie	Wendee Lee
Mitsuko Kohmyoji	Yui Horie	Lia Sargent
Masaru Kohmyoji	Yumiko Kobayashi	Barbara Goodson
Dr. Den Kohmyoji	Shōzō Iizuka	Christopher Carrol
Hattori Hanpei	Keaton Yamada	Kirk Thornton
Etsuko Sarutobi	Etsuko Kozakura	Melissa Fahn
Rieko	Sayaka Ohara	Peggy O'Neal
Futen	Ichirō Nagai	Simon Prescott
Akira	Madoka Akita	Brianne Siddall
Saburo/Hakaider	Juurouta Kosugi	Steven Blum
Chigusa Sakamoto	Minami Takayama	Carolyn Hennesy
Prof. Gill/Gill Hakaider	Shinji Ogawa	Michael Gregory
Green Mantis	Masahiro Ogata	—N/a
Carmine Spider	Masashi Hirose	Lex Lang
Orange Ant	Jin Yamanoi	Peter Lurie
Yellow Jaguar	Nobuyuki Hiyama	Bob Papenbrook
Golden Bat	Norio Wakamoto	Michael McConnohie
Kuya & Kaito	Hisayoshi Suganuma	Anthony Pulcini
Red Hakaider	Hidenari Ugaki	Skip Stellrecht
Silver Hakaider	Kouichi Toochika	Eddie Frierson
Blue Hakaider	Takuma Suzuki	Steve McGowan
Shadow Knight	Takeshi Watabe	Bob Papenbrook
Saburo Kazeda/Inazuman	Kappei Yamaguchi	—N/a
Myoppe	Sayuri Yoshida	—N/a
Zaddam	Mugihito	Peter Spellos

== Episodes ==
=== Android Kikaider: The Animation ===
English airdates are from its first English dub broadcast on Adult Swim in the United States.

No.	Title	Written by	Original release date	English airdate
1	"Lonely Puppet"; Transliteration: "Kodoku na Ningyō" (Japanese: 孤独な人形)	Akemi Omode	October 16, 2000	June 9, 2003
2	"Mad Machine"; Transliteration: "Kurutta Kikai" (Japanese: 狂った機械)	Shinsuke Onishi	October 23, 2000	June 10, 2003
3	"Stray Sheep"; Transliteration: "Sutorei Shīpu" (Japanese: ストレイ・シープ)	Masashi Sogo	October 30, 2000	June 11, 2003
4	"Mirror"; Transliteration: "Kagami" (Japanese: 鏡)	Shinsuke Onishi	November 6, 2000	June 12, 2003
5	"City of Rain"; Transliteration: "Ame no Machi" (Japanese: 雨の街)	Akemi Omode	November 13, 2000	June 16, 2003
6	"Negative Fragments"; Transliteration: "Fu no Danpen" (Japanese: 負の断片)	Masashi Sogo	November 20, 2000	June 17, 2003
7	"Afterglow of Regret"; Transliteration: "Hi no Zanshō" (Japanese: 非の残照)	Shinsuke Onishi	November 27, 2000	June 18, 2003
8	"Blue Moon, Red Dreams"; Transliteration: "Aoi Tsuki, Akai Yume" (Japanese: 青い月、赤い夢)	N/A	December 4, 2000	N/A
9	"Friends"; Transliteration: "Tomodachi" (Japanese: ともだち)	Akemi Omode	December 11, 2000	June 19, 2003
10	"Frozen Bonds"; Transliteration: "Kōru Kizuna" (Japanese: 凍る絆)	Masashi Sogo	December 18, 2000	June 23, 2003
11	"The Destroyer"; Transliteration: "Hakaima" (Japanese: 破壊魔)	Shinsuke Onishi	December 25, 2000	June 24, 2003
12	"The Machine That Dreams"; Transliteration: "Yumemiru Kikai" (Japanese: 夢みる機械)	Akemi Omode	January 1, 2001	June 25, 2003
13	"The End of the Dream"; Transliteration: "Yume no Matsuro" (Japanese: 夢の末路)	Akemi Omode	January 8, 2001	June 26, 2003

=== Kikaider 01: The Animation ===
No.	Title	Original release date	English airdate
1	"Jiro Meets Ichiro"	November 21, 2001	June 30, 2003
2	"Beautiful Enemy"	December 19, 2001	July 1, 2003
3	"Gil Rises Again"	January 23, 2002	July 2, 2003
4	"The Fate Of Pinocchio"	March 20, 2002	July 3, 2003
Bonus	"The Boy Who Carried a Guitar: Kikaider vs. Inazuman"; Transliteration: "Gitā o motta shōnen - Kikaidā VS Inazuman -" (Japanese: ギターを持った少年 -キカイダーVSイナズマン-)	September 19, 2003	N/A

== Media ==
=== Soundtrack ===
A soundtrack for the first animated series of Kikaider called Android Kikaider: The Animation Original Soundtrack (人造人間キカイダー ― THE ANIMATION オリジナル・サウンドトラック, Jinzō ningen kikaidā― THE ANIMATION orijinaru saundotorakku) was released on December 6, 2000. It was composed by Akira Mitake and distributed by SME Visual Works.

Android Kikaider: The Animation Original Soundtrack
No.	Title	Length
1.	"Theme of Gemini" (by Akita Mitake)	1:35
2.	"Friends of Enemies"	2:30
3.	"Past Tears"	2:19
4.	"Devil's Flute"	1:35
5.	"Dark"	2:33
6.	"For the Destruction"	0:52
7.	"Rejoice"	1:47
8.	"Material World"	1:32
9.	"Jiro's Guitar (part 1)"	1:20
10.	"Coming Armegeddon"	3:13
11.	"Wild Detectives"	1:13
12.	"Song of a Street Musician"	0:43
13.	"Waiting for the Dawn"	2:53
14.	"Equinox"	2:47
15.	"Beastly Puppets"	2:20
16.	"Tempest"	2:11
17.	"Between Brothers and Sisters"	2:00
18.	"Jiro's Guitar (part 2)"	1:26
19.	"Tearful Smile"	2:09
20.	"Equinox (violin version)"	2:28
21.	"Floating"	3:45
22.	"Destiny" (by Yui Horie)	4:17

Another Soundtrack called Kikaider 01: The Animation Original Soundtrack (キカイダー01 THE ANIMATION ― オリジナル・サウンドトラック, Jinzō ningen kikaidā― THE ANIMATION orijinaru saundotorakku) was released on March 6, 2003. Music was composed by Kaworu Wada and distributed by SME Visual Works.

Kikaider 01: The Animation Original Soundtrack
No.	Title	Length
1.	"Day of wrath - Main Theme" (メインテーマ~怒りの日~ (Meintēma ~ Ikari no Hi ~))
2.	"Title" (タイトル (Taitoru))
3.	"Looming Threat" (迫り来る脅威 (Semari Kuru Kyōi))
4.	"Organization of the Shadow" (影の組織 (Kage no Soshiki))
5.	"Kikaider, Change" (キカイダー、チェンジ (Kikaidā, Chenji))
6.	"Revived Memories" (甦る記憶 (Yomigaeru Kioku))
7.	"Seal - Main Theme" (メインテーマ~封印~ (Meintēma ~ Fūin ~))
8.	"Kohmyoji and Vayu - Main Theme" (メインテーマ~風天と光明寺~ (Meintēma ~-Fū Ten to Kōmyōji ~))
9.	"Shadow Knight" (シャドウナイト (Shado Naito))
10.	"Battle of Ichiro" (イチローの戦い (Ichirō no Tatakai))
11.	"Robot Without a Heart - Main Theme" (メインテーマ~心を持たぬロボット~ (Meintēma ~-Shin o Motanu Robotto ~))
12.	"Escape" (脱出 (Dasshutsu))
13.	"Hakaider Again" (ハカイダー再び (Hakaidā Futatabi))
14.	"Hakaider Four Group" (ハカイダー四人衆 (Hakaidā Yonnin Shū))
15.	"The Main Theme ~Vol.1 Ending~" (メインテーマ~Vol.1エンディング~ (Meintēma ~ Vol. 1 Endingu ~))
16.	"Quicken the Dark" (胎動する暗闇 (Taidō Suru Kurayami))
17.	"My Name is Bijinder" (私の名前はビジンダー (Watashi no Namae wa Bijindā))
18.	"Thug Dancing Flowers" (花に舞う刺客 (Hana ni Mau Shikaku))
19.	"Fate Met" (出会った運命 (Deatta Unmei))
20.	"Dark Eyes" (闇の視線 (Yami no Shisen))
21.	"Sweet Memories" (優しい想い出 (Yasashii Omoide))
22.	"Battle of Bungalow" (バンガローの攻防 (Bangarō no Kōbō))
23.	"Hakaider Plus Power" (ハカイダー・プラスパワー (Hakaidā Purasu Pawā))
24.	"Determination" (決意 (Ketsui))
25.	"Lurking in the Shadows" (影に潜む (Kage ni Hisomu))
26.	"And Pinocchio..." (そしてピノキオは... (Soshite Pinokio wa...))
27.	"Memories of Rieko" (リエ子の想い出 (Rieko no Omoide))
28.	"Trap" (罠 (Wana))
29.	"Professor Gill" (プロフェッサー・ギル (Purofessā Giru))
30.	"Fleetingly Sunset" (夕焼けに儚く (Yūyake ni Hakanaku))
31.	"Surrounding Sorrow" (哀しみを囲んで (哀しみを囲んで))
32.	"Feelings in my Heart" (この胸の思い (Kono Mune no Omoi))
33.	"Street Fighting" (市街戦 (Shigai-sen))
34.	"Armageddongod Exercise - Main Theme" (メインテーマ~発動するアーマゲドンゴッド~ (Meintēma ~ Hatsudō Suru Amagedongoddo ~))
35.	"Ambition Awakening" (覚醒する野望 (Kakusei Suru Yabō))
36.	"Dreaming Dolls" (人形が見る夢 (Ningyō ga Miru Yume))
37.	"Conclusion of Dreams" (夢のおわり (Yume no Owari))
38.	"Day of Tears Lacrimosa" (涙の日 Lacrimosa (Namida no hi Lacrimosa))

== Reception ==
On Anime News Network, Zac Bertschy gave the first DVD an overall grade of B.
