= Inazuman =

Television series

- Title card
- Also known as: Inazuman Flash (season 2)
- Genre: Tokusatsu; Superhero fiction Science fiction Action/Adventure; Fantasy
- Created by: Shotaro Ishinomori
- Developed by: Masaru Igami (Inazuman); Shozo Uehara (Inazuman Flash)
- Directed by: Katsuhiko Taguchi
- Starring: Daisuke Ban
- Narrated by: Ichirō Murakoshi
- Music by: Michiaki Watanabe
- Country of origin: Japan
- No. of seasons: 2
- No. of episodes: 48

Production
- Running time: 25 minutes
- Production companies: Toei Company; Ishimori Productions

Original release
- Network: NET
- Release: October 2, 1973 – September 24, 1974

Related
- Manga
- Written by: Shotaro Ishinomori
- Published by: Shogakukan
- Magazine: Weekly Shōnen Sunday
- Original run: 1973 – 1974
- Volumes: 3

Inazuman (イナズマン) is a television series starring a mutant fictional character of the same name created by Shotaro Ishinomori. The first television series ran from October 2, 1973, to March 26, 1974, with a total of 25 episodes. A second season named Inazuman Flash (イナズマンF(フラッシュ), Inazuman Furasshu) aired in 1974 from April 9 to September 24 with a total of 23 episodes.

== Inazuman specs ==
Inazuman is, in reality, young college student Goro Watari (渡 五郎, Watari Gorō), a mutant. He lost his mother as a child and had other dark moments in his childhood (he had a childhood girlfriend named Teresa (テレサ) who was taken away by an American soldier during the US occupation of Japan). However, when the Neo-Human Empire Phantom Army (新人類帝国ファントム軍団, Shinjinrui Teikoku Fantomu Gundan) begins its attacks on humankind with its Phantom Soldiers (ファントム兵士, Fantomu Heishi) and Demon Creatures (悪魔の生き物, Akuma no ikimono), he puts his psionic powers to the test.

First, he performs a henshin (transforming) pose (crossing his arms in front of his chest) and uttering the phrase, "Gōriki Shōrai" (剛力招来; literally "Summon Mighty Power"), he is wrapped in a blue cocoon, which bursts, revealing the creature Sanagiman (サナギマン). He resembles an armored brown pupa mutant with a white belt which has a biomechanical power meter on it.

Sanagiman is able to absorb the kinetic energy of any attack used against him, and when he gathers enough energy into his belt, he crosses his fists in front of his chest, uttering the phrase, "Chōriki Shōrai" (超力招来; literally "Summon Super Power"), and spreads them aside, with his chest emitting a swirl of colorful energy. Sanagiman's exterior then explodes to pieces, and in his place is Inazuman. He is a moth-like mutant wearing the same power belt as Sanagiman and resembles a blue humanoid with huge colorful oval eyes, prominent lightning-shaped antennas, black gloves and boots, yellow lightning-shaped marks that stream down his body, and a yellow scarf he can transform into various weapons, including a whip-like chain.

As both Sanagiman and Inazuman, his kiai fighting cry is "Chest!" (チェスト！, Chesuto!), which originates from the Japanese island of Kyūshū where the main character, Goro Watari, hails.

Goro is a member of the Youth League (少年同盟, Shōnen Dōmei), a Science Patrol-style group of similarly psychic-powered young people, and has a telepathic link with the sentient flying car Raijingo (ライジンゴー, Raijingō) which can fire missiles and bite bad guys with the teeth built into its mouth-like grill ("Raijin" is the Japanese god of thunder).

== Media ==
=== Manga ===
A manga adaptation by creator Shotaro Ishinomori was serialized in Shogakukan's Weekly Shōnen Sunday from 1973 to 1974. In the manga adaptation, Goro Watari is a junior high school student named Saburo Kazeta (風田 サブロウ, Kazeta Saburō), and is nicknamed "Sabu" (サブ). The character first appeared in Ishinomori's manga "Mutant Sabu".

Inazuman appeared somewhat different than in the live action tokusatsu version, and was created when the series was in development as an animated series, provisionally titled "Mutant Z". In these versions, the character appeared to be naked, with a curled proboscis stemming from his forehead, and was even able to sprout moth wings from his back. The manga version of Sanagiman was also slightly different from the tokusatsu version. In the manga, Saburo has also a childhood girlfriend nicknamed "Miyoppe" (ミヨッペ) who is usually the victim of Saburo's jokes with his psychic powers.

=== Tokusatsu series ===
Inazuman (イナズマン) was produced by Toei Company Ltd. and broadcast on NET (now TV Asahi) from October 2, 1973, to March 26, 1974, with a total of 25 episodes. The series starred Daisuke Ban (as Naoya Ban) of Kikaider fame in the title role as he fights Emperor Banba (帝王バンバ, Teiō Banba) and his mutant minions. The entire 48-episode series was broadcast (with English subtitles) on KIKU-TV in Honolulu, Hawaii in the mid-1970s, during the height of the popularity of tokusatsu programs ignited by the success of Kikaider in 1974.

1. Horror of the Neo-Human Race: The Challenge of Banba!! (恐怖の新人類 バンバの挑戦!!, Kyōfu no Shinjinrui Banba no Chōsen!!)
2. Youth League, Beware! The Cursed Water!! (危うし少年同盟! 呪いの水!!, Ayaushi Shōnen Dōmei! Noroi no Mizu!!)
3. Phantom Hell Beckons the Black Death! (黒い死を呼ぶファントム地獄!, Kuroi Shi o Yobu Fantomu Jigoku!)
4. The Japanese Archipelago Explodes!! (日本列島大爆発!!, Nihon Rettō Daibakuhatsu!!)
5. Epic Dogfight! Raijingo Bites!! (大空中戦! かみつくライジンゴー!!, Daikūchūsen! Kamitsuku Raijingō!!)
6. Bizarre Snow Banbara's Neo-Human Surgery!! (怪奇ユキバンバラ! 新人類手術!!, Kaiki Yuki Banbara! Shinjinrui Shujutsu!!)
7. Weird! A Flying Eye!? (奇怪! 空飛ぶ一ツ目!?, Kikai! Sora Tobu Hitotsume!?)
8. Terrifying Sandstorm! Major Airport Engulfed!! (恐怖砂あらし! 大空港沈没!!, Kyōfu Sunaarashi! Daikūkō Chinbotsu!!)
9. The Glowing Mold Stalks the Night!! (光るカビは夜歩く!!, Hikaru Kabi wa Yoru Aruku!!)
10. Terror of the Carnivorous Gas!! (人喰いガスの恐怖!!, Hitokui Gasu no Kyōfu!!)
11. Rose Banbara is Inazuman's Mother (バラバンバラはイナズマンの母, Bara Banbara wa Inazuman no Haha)
12. Mother's Enemy: Banba vs. Inazuman (母の仇バンバ対イナズマン, Haha no Kataki Banba Tai Inazuman)
13. Inazuman Wounded (傷ついたイナズマン, Kizutsuita Inazuman)
14. The Fury of Raijingo: Great Dogfight!! (怒りのライジンゴー 大空中戦!!, Ikari no Raijingō Daikūchūsen!!)
15. A Mother's Shadow Devoured (影をくわれたお母さん, Kage o Kuwareta Okāsan)
16. Race to Fulfill a Promise! (約束に向って走れ!, Yakusoku ni Mukatte Hashire!)
17. Puzzling Confrontation! Two Goro Wataris!! (謎の対決! ふたりの渡五郎!!, Nazo no Taiketsu! Futari no Watari Gorō!!)
18. A Lightning Strike for Friendship!! (友情のイナズマ落し!!, Yūjō no Inazuma Otoshi!!)
19. The Mysterious Deadly Boxer: Mirror X? (謎の殺人ボクサー ミラーX?, Nazo no Satsujin Bokusā Mirā Ekkusu?)
20. Chase the Star Saucer! Raijingo!! (星円盤を追え! ライジンゴー!!, Hoshi Enban o Oe! Raijngō!!)
21. Watari Goro: Inazuman Dies!? (渡五郎 イナズマン死す!?, Watari Gorō Inazuman Shisu!?)
22. The Walking Clay Doll: Terror of the Cracking Earth!! (歩く土人形 恐怖の大地割れ!!, Aruku Tsuchi Ningyō Kyōfu no Daijiware!!)
23. The Cursed Paint That Melts Humans (呪いのえのぐが人を溶かす, Noroi no Enogu ga Hito o Tokasu)
24. The Mysterious Robot Warrior? (謎のロボット戦士?, Nazo no Robotto Senshi?)
25. Majestic! The End of Emperor Banba!! (壮烈! 帝王バンバの最期!!, Sōretsu! Teiō Banba no Saigo!!)

Inazuman 3D Movie Project (飛び出す立体映画 イナズマン Tobidasu Rittai Eiga Inazuman)

Inazuman Flash (イナズマンF（フラッシュ）, Inazuman Furasshu) was produced by Toei Company Ltd. and broadcast on NET (now TV Asahi) from April 9, 1974, to September 24, 1974, with a total of 23 episodes. A direct and darker continuation of the first series, a new enemy emerges in the evil robots of the Despar Army (デスパー軍団, Desupā Gundan) led by Führer Geisel (ガイゼル総統, Gaizeru Sōtō). Inazuman, gaining the ability to hurl lightning bolts, is joined by a cynical cyborg Interpol agent named Makoto Arai (荒井 誠, Arai Makoto).

1. Terror of Führer Geisel and the Mysterious Despar Army! (恐怖のガイゼル総統と謎のデスパー軍団!, Kyōfu no Gaizeru Sōtō to Nazo no Gundan!)
2. Terrifying Safari!! Great Operation at Sea!! (戦慄のサファリ! 海中大作戦!!, Senritsu no Safari! Kaichū Daisakusen!!)
3. 500 Hydrogen Bombs!! Great Underground Battle! (水爆500発!! 地底大戦争!, Subaku Gohyappatsu!! Chitei Daisensō!)
4. The Mysterious Airship? To Space!! (謎の飛行船? 宇宙へ!!, Nazo no Hikōsen? Uchū e!!)
5. DES Missiles: Great Aerial Battle!! (DES（デス）ミサイル大空中戦!!, Desu Misairu Daikūchūsen!!)
6. Geisel's Great Fort (ガイゼルの大要塞, Gaizeru no Daiyōsai)
7. Great Decisive Battle! Udespar vs. Inazuman!! (大決戦! ウデスパー対イナズマン!!, Daikessen! Udesupā Tai Inazuman!!)
8. Udespar Siblings! Cross Hurricane!! (ウデスパー兄弟! クロスハリケーン!!, Udesupā Kyōdai! Kurosu Harikēn)
9. Boys Circus and Great Multi-Operation (少年サーカスとマルチ大作戦, Shōnen Sākasu to Maruchi Daisakusen)
10. Udespar Siblings' Defiant Shape (ウデスパー兄弟の挑戦状!!, Udesupā Kyōdai no Chōsenjō!!)
11. Beautiful Cyborg! The Alter-ego at Dawn!! (美しいサイボーグ! 暁に分身す!!, Utsukushii Saibōgu! Akatsuki ni Bunshin su!!)
12. Phantom City: Despar City (幻影都市デスパー・シティ, Genei Toshi Desupā Shiti)
13. White Darkness!! Witch Sings the Babysitter Song (白い闇!! 鬼女がうたう子守歌, Shiroi Yami!! Kijo ga Utau Komoriuta)
14. Great Aerial Battle!! Combine Udespar Tactical Squad (大空中戦!! 合体ウデスパー戦略部隊, Daikūchūsen!! Gattai Udesupā Senryaku Butai)
15. Big Flood Operation!! (大洪水作戦!!, Daikōzui Sakusen!!)
16. The Mysterious Woman: Whose Name is the Despar Secret Agent (謎の女 その名はデスパー秘密捜査官, Nazo no Onna Sono Na wa Desupā Himitsu Sōsakan)
17. Blue Pupils of the Invader (青い瞳のインベーダー, Aoi Hitomi no Inbēdā)
18. Red Queen: Ballad of Assassination (レッドクイン 暗殺のバラード, Red Kuin Ansatsu no Barādo)
19. Inazuman: Joins the Despar Army!! (イナズマン デスパー軍団に入隊す!!, Inazuman Desupā Gundan ni Nyūtai su!!)
20. Butterfly and Guillotine: Flower Hell Operation (蝶とギロチン 花地獄作戦, Chō to Girochin Hana Jigoku Sakusen)
21. The Deceased Squad - Route 047 (死者部隊ルート047, Shisha Butai Rūto)
22. Kill the Burdensome Ones: Geisel's Supereme Command (邪魔者は殺（け）せ ガイゼルの至上命令, Jamamono wa Kese Gaizeru no Shijō Meirei)
23. Farewell Inazuman: Geisel's Last Day (さらばイナズマン ガイゼル最期の日, Saraba Inazuman Gaizeru Saigo no Hi)

=== Kamen Rider series ===
- In commemoration of the Toei Company's 60th Anniversary in 2011, Inazuman makes a cameo in the crossover film OOO, Den-O, All Riders: Let's Go Kamen Riders, in which he destroys Kamen Rider Stronger villain, General Shadow alongside Kikaider, Kikaider 01, and Zubat.
- An alternative version of Inazuman based on the manga appears in the 2012 film Kamen Rider × Kamen Rider Wizard & Fourze: Movie War Ultimatum. The film's version of Saburo Kazeta is a high school student who becomes a hero under the guidance of his homeroom teacher, Gentaro Kisaragi, and would later make a cameo appearance in the crossover film Kamen Rider × Super Sentai × Space Sheriff: Super Hero Taisen Z.

== Demon creatures ==
Demon creatures were psionics converted into neo-humans, sometimes involuntarily, by the Neo-Human Empire led by Emperor Banba and the commanders of the Phantom Soldiers.

- Quintuple Banbara: Appears in episode 1, and movie. Powers include invisibility, creating fissures from his left arm called the Terra Splitter, long range flames from the mouth of his middle face called the Pillar of Fire, a human disguise, and high jumping.
- Water Banbara: Appears in episode 2. Powers include teleporting and controlling water, reverting into toxic water that can spawn holograms of himself, constricting seaweed called the Seaweed Squeeze, teleporting and size growth by water, a high pressure hose from the left arm, and summoning small waterspouts.
- Bubo Banbara: Appears in episode 3. Powers include hurricane-force winds from a fan hidden in his back, freezing mouth foam powered by banbacteria, and invisibility.
- Bone Banbara: Appears in episode 4. Powers include rib daggers in the torso, damaging people in their dreams, teleportation, remote cross bombs called the Devil's Cross, body part separation, soul stealing, a femur-like club, and summoning flames called the Flames of Purgatory.
- Gale Banbara: Appears in episode 5, and movie. Powers include manipulating wind, a human disguise, and spawning cyclones called the Cyclonic Wind.
- Snow Banbara: Appears in episode 6. Powers include icy mouth mist called the Absolute Zero Blizzard, teleportation, a human disguise, a sharp icicles called the Ice Daggers, and summoning a blizzard called the Banbara Snow Slide.
- Hundred-Eye Banbara: Appears in episode 7. Powers include teleportation, hypnosis called the Eyesolation Barrier, attaching evil eyes that make psionics become violent against their will, a human disguise, telekinesis, and summoning the Mammoth Eye flying base.
- Sand Banbara: Appears in episode 8, and movie. Powers include sand manipulation to the point of spawning storms and quick sand, converting water into sand, teleportation, a cone-like trap called the Sand Bambara Hell Trap used for psionics, and dissolving into sand and reforming.
- Mold Banbara: Appears in episode 9, and movie. Powers include acidic mold tentacles from the mouth called the Mold Banbara Mangler Hold, dissolving into mold and reforming, mind control mold spores with teleportation properties, and summoning a mold tsunami using giant versions of the mold tentacles.
- Gas Banbara: Appears in episode 10. Powers include emitting acidic poisonous gas, a spiked kanabo for the left arm, a human disguise, mouth grenades, summoning rock slides called the Mountain Tsunami, and mentally controlling the Phantom Train.
- Rose Banbara: Appears in episode 11. Powers include disguising herself as a giant rose, toxic pedals called the Pedal Pressure, teleportation, summoning roses on eyes called the Rose Blinders, vines from the left arm called the Vine Binder, an extendable thorny root for the right arm called the Thorn Thrust, high jumping, a human disguise, and paralyzing pollen called the Paralyzer Pollen. In a tragic twist, this monster turns out to be Goro's long-lost mother, Shinobu Watari.
- Devil Banbara: Appears in episode 12, and movie. Powers include a flamethrower from the snake-like left arm and a human disguise.
- Oil Banbara: Appears in episode 13, and movie. Powers include dissolving into oil and gas, telepathy, possession via a jar, emitting oil from his fingers, eye flames, and summoning a pocket dimension called the World of Fire.
- Fog Banbara: Appears in episode 14, and movie. Powers include emitting fog and summoning a UFO attack bomber armed with a flamethrower.
- Shadow Banbara: Appears in episode 15. Powers include telepathy, mental shackles called the Shadow Shackles, spawning a dark zone called the Shadow Shroud, possession, transforming into a shadow, damaging people by breaking and eating shadows, and summoning a pocket dimension called the Shadow World.
- Thorn Banbara: Appears in episode 16, and movie. Powers include detachable poisonous thorns that can be mentally guided, high jumping, and increasing the size of his thorns to those of missiles.
- Photo Banbara: Appears in episode 17. Powers include mentally freezing people with his left hand called the Time Shutter and disguising himself as people from his photographs.
- Poison Banbara: Appears in episode 18. Powers include reanimating venom on the right hand, claws blinding poisonous gas from the left arm, transforming himself and other psionics into giant explosive mushrooms, and a spear.
- Mirror Banbara: Appears in episode 19, and movie. Powers include a human disguise, boxing glove hands, a solar heat ray from the torso, floating triangular mirrors used to blind enemies called the Mirror Banbara Light Barrage, and using decoy mirror reflections for fast movement.
- Star Banbara: Appears in episode 20, and movie. Powers include teleportation, mentally controlling the Star Saucer armed with a cannon, telekinesis, and telepathic bombs.
- Bamboo Banbara: Appears in episode 21, and movie. Powers include shooting poisonous bamboo arrows and tentacles from the body cavities, duplicates, a human disguise, a poisonous spear, and summoning long roots for constriction and summoning a pocket dimension.
- Clay Banbara: Appears in episode 22, and movie. Powers include burrowing, summoning high wind called the Clay Blizzard, creating fissures called the Earth Cracker, body reformation, teleportation, clay statue probes, and absorbing clay particles from the mouth.
- Paint Banbara: Appears in episode 23, and movie. Powers include transforming into a blob of paint or gas, emitting paint-like and gas-like acid, summoning high wind, a pocket dimension filled with acidic paint called the Accursed World, paint tube-like homing missiles called the Tube Missiles, and an acidic paint storm called the Paint Blizzard.
- Stone Banbara: Appears in episode 24, and movie. Powers include breaking down into boulders and reforming, rock bombs, and teleporting.

== Robot Fighters ==
Serving as the enemies of Flash, Robot Fighters are robots created by the Despa Army and the leaders of Despa soldiers. These robots were designed to be stronger than the Demon Creatures of the Banba Empire and were under the direct control of Udespa's various incarnations. Due to budget cuts in production some Robot Fighters had a second appearance with minimal modification in the second half of the series.

- Missile Despa: Appears in movie. Powers include Rockets on his wrist and on his head.
- Hammer Despa: Appears in episodes 01 and 18. Powers include a claw hammer on a chain and reinforced torso armor. Upon being upgraded he acquired a claw hammer for his right arm.
- Saw Despa: Appears in episodes 1, 2, and 16. Powers include smoke bombs, circular saw grenades on the shoulders, and summoning a flying submarine with a lasso, a machine gun turret, and an electric spray. Upon being upgraded he acquired a circular saw for his left hand.
- Burner Despa: Appears in episode 03. Powers include a very hot flamethrower for the left arm that can also release smoke, summoning a flying drill tank called the Despar Tank armed with a pair of missile launchers and a web shooter, and armor thick enough to survive high drops.
- Drill Despa: Appears in episodes 04 and 15. Powers include a left shoulder drill called the Drill Driller, red lightning bolts and radioactive flashes from the eye on the torso called the Drill Heart Beam, and fast burrowing. Upon being upgraded with the power machine he acquired a weapon called the Despa Destruction Beam strong enough to obliterate a mountain fired from the abdomen.
- Machine Gun Despa: Appears in episode 05. Powers include a human disguise, a 3-barreled machine gun on each side of the waist, and guided missiles from a jeep.
- Knife Despa: Appears in episode 06. Powers include a large bowie knife for the right hand, a long carving knife, using both knives as scissors strong enough to cut steel, a pair of launchable knives in the left wrist, high jumping, and summoning a circular saw-like flying saucer.
- Miss Wan: Appears in episode 07. Powers include high jumping, martial arts skills, machine gun, and a knife.
- Jet Despa: Appears in episode 08 and 17. Powers include jet- a human disguise, freezing mist from the left arm nozzle, summoning a subsonic jet armed with an underside claw and a back cannon, and an arm time bomb. Upon being upgraded he acquired a normal left hand, a human disguise named Jet, and a machine gun.
- Scissors Despa: Appears in episode 09. Powers include bladed hands used as scissor sheers, high jumping, and detaching the scissors arms by using rockets called in an attack called the Scissor Cannon.
- Magnet Despa: Appears in episode 10. Powers include a head magnet on a chain that emits lethal amounts of magnetic waves called the Magnet Chain, summoning a subsonic jet armed with a pair of machine guns, and armor thick enough to survive high drops.
- Silencer Despa: Appears in episode 11. Powers include a right hand machine gun, teleportation, a human disguise, spawning a duplicate, mentally detonated mines, and summoning a flying saucer armed with a rapid-fire cannon.
- Boiler Despa: Appears in episode 12. Powers include explosive fire arrows from the left hand and using said hand as a club.
- Onibaba: Appears in episode 13. Powers include teleportation, summoning fog, and a mentally controlled ax. It is the disguise form of Ax Despa.
- Ax Despa: Appears in episode 14. Powers include an Onibaba disguise, a right hand mentally controlled ax that can cause explosions on contact called the Ax Bomber, teleportation, and spawning holograms of himself.
- Mixer Despa: Appears in episode 19. Powers include rolling into a ball, shoulder missiles, detachable hands that latch onto enemies, and a ray gun that emits hypnotic flashes.
- Guillotine Despa: Appears in episodes 19 & 20. Powers include converting into wind, a guillotine for the right hand, and a clamp for the left hand.
- Spray Despa: Appears in episode 21. Powers include a poison gas nozzle for the fight arm, a short sword, a net from the left shoulder cannon called the Despider, and teleportation.
- Black Despa: Appears in episode 22. Powers include a human disguise, a pistol, high jumping, and throwing knives.

=== Udespas ===
- Udesupa: Appears in Inazuman episodes 24-25 and Inazuman F episodes 01–07. Powers include a motorcycle, a machine gun, a missile launcher, high jumping, a claw that attaches to right hand, a whip that attaches to left hand, and grenades,
- Udesupa Alpha: Appears in episodes 08–14. Powers include a human disguise, the Despa Straining Hurricane, a detachable left arm claw, high jumping, and combining.
- Udespa Beta: Appears in episodes 08–14. Powers include a human disguise, the Despa Straining Hurricane, a detachable right arm whip, high jumping, and combining.
- Combined Udespa: Appears in episodes 10, 11, 13 and 14. Powers include a trident right hand, a tentacle left hand with a hidden arresting wire, and thick armor.
- Sadesupa: Appears in episodes 12–23. Powers include explosive hypnotic waves from his cross-like eye, a human disguise, nine iron maiden-like spikes in the torso, and high jumping.

== Cast ==
- Goro Watari (渡 五郎, Watari Gorō): Daisuke Ban (伴 大介, Ban Daisuke)
- Gōsaku Marume (丸目 豪作, Marume Gōsaku): Kōichi Kitamura (北村晃一, Kitamura Kōichi)
- Satoko Ōgi (大木 サトコ, Ōgi Satoko): Mari Sakurai (桜井 マリ, Sakurai Mari)
- Katsumi Ōgi (大木 カツミ, Ōgi Katsumi): Yoshikazu Yamada (山田 芳一, Yamada Yoshikazu)
- Kaoru Tomikawa (富川 カオル, Tomikawa Kaoru): Fusayo Fukawa (府川 房代, Fukawa Fusayo)
- Captain Salar (キャプテンサラー, Kyaputen Sarā): Hideo Murota (室田 日出男, Murota Hideo)
- Emperor Banba (帝王バンバ, Teiō Banba; Voice): Shōzō Iizuka (飯塚 昭三, Iizuka Shōzō)
  - Suit Actor: Rikiya Ikeda (池田 力也, Ikeda Rikiya)
- Shinobu Watari (渡 シノブ, Watari Shinobu): Yūko Hamada (浜田 ゆう子, Hamada Yūko)
- Udesper (ウデスパー, Udesupā; Voice): Masaki Iwana (岩名 雅記, Iwana Masaki)
- Führer Geisel (ガイゼル総統, Gaizeru Sōtō): Mitsuo Andō (安藤 三男, Andō Mitsuo)
- Narrator (ナレーター, Narētā): Ichirō Murakoshi (村越伊知郎, Murakoshi Ichirō)

== Other appearances ==
- Inazuman in the 2002 OVA anime special, The Boy Who Carried a Guitar: Kikaider vs. Inazuman, based on an issue from the Inazuman manga that teamed the insectoid mutant superhero with Ishinomori's android superhero, Kikaider.

== Home video ==
Released on DVD in Hawaii by JN Productions/Generation Kikaida in 2010
