= Khara (studio) =

Japanese animation studio

khara, Inc.
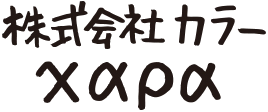
- Native name: 株式会社カラー
- Romanized name: Kabushiki-gaisha Karā
- Type: Kabushiki-gaisha
- Industry: Japanese animation; Character licensing
- Predecessor: Gainax
- Founded: May 17, 2006; 20 years ago
- Founder: Hideaki Anno
- Headquarters: Shoan, Suginami, Tokyo, Japan
- Key people: Hideaki Anno (president and CEO)
- Number of employees: 90
- Divisions: Studio Khara Digital-bu
- Website: www.khara.co.jp

Khara, Inc. (株式会社カラー, Kabushiki-gaisha Karā; stylized as khara, Inc.) is a Japanese independent animation studio and character licensing company, located in Suginami, Tokyo, best known for its work on the Rebuild of Evangelion film tetralogy. Studio Khara (スタジオカラー, Sutajio Karā) is the primary animation production studio of Khara. It was founded by Hideaki Anno on May 17, 2006, and was shown publicly on August 1, when recruitment notices were posted on his website; Anno remains its president.

The name khara comes from the Greek word χαρά, meaning joy. The company's logo is this word handwritten in Greek letters by Anno's wife, Moyoco.

== History ==
In 2007, Anno left Gainax and transitioned to Khara; as part of his public statements on the Rebuild films, he wrote:

For this purpose, we are not returning to our roots at Gainax. I have set up a production company and studio, and it is in this new setting that we will start again. Without looking back, without admiration for the circumstances, we aim to walk towards the future. Thankfully, we have gathered staff from the old series, new staff, and many other fantastic staff to work on this series. We realize that we are creating something that will be better than the last series.

Key contributors brought back to work on the new project include director Kazuya Tsurumaki, character designer Yoshiyuki Sadamoto, storyboard artist Shinji Higuchi, composer Shirō Sagisu, and animator Mahiro Maeda.

By 2014, the copyright for the Neon Genesis Evangelion series was transferred to Khara.

In 2016, Khara sued Gainax for ¥100 million in unpaid royalties from an agreement that Khara would earn royalties from income received on works and properties that founder Hideaki Anno had worked on. The suit alleged that Gainax delayed on paying royalties and incurred a large debt with Khara, which had loaned ¥100 million in August 2014, but had yet to receive payment on the loan. On June 7, 2024, Gainax announced that the company has filed for bankruptcy on May 29, making the Gainax trademark being transferred to Khara.

On August 21, 2024, Khara announced that they had successfully acquired the intellectual property of all P Productions' tokusatsu works, after the company ceased producing tokusatsu series following Lion-Maru G.

On October 6, 2024, Khara announced that they would begin production on a new Space Battleship Yamato film in 2025. All that is currently known is that it will be unconnected to prior remakes done by other companies.

== Works ==
=== Television ===
- The Dragon Dentist (2017)
- The Diary of Ochibi-san (2023–2024)
- Kaiju No. 8 (2024; kaiju designs)
- Mobile Suit Gundam GQuuuuuuX (2025; co-produced with Sunrise)
- Untitled Neon Genesis Evangelion anime series (TBA; co-produced with CloverWorks)

=== OVA/ONAs ===
- Japan Animator Expo (2014–2015)
- Patlabor Reboot (2016)
- Gravity Rush: The Animation ~ Overture ~ (2016)
- VOY@GER (2021; co-produced with CloverWorks)
- Sugar Sugar Rune: Les Deux Sorcières (2025)

=== Animated films ===
- Evangelion: 1.0 You Are (Not) Alone (2007)
- Evangelion: 2.0 You Can (Not) Advance (2009)
- Evangelion: 3.0 You Can (Not) Redo (2012)
- Mary and the Witch's Flower (2017; co-produced with Studio Ponoc)
- Evangelion: 3.0+1.0 Thrice Upon a Time (2021)
- Baahubali: The Eternal War - Part 1 (2027)
- Space Battleship Yamato √2199 (TBA; co-produced with Production I.G)

=== Live-action films ===
- Kantoku Shikkaku (2011)
- Giant God Warrior Appears in Tokyo (2012, co-produced with Studio Ghibli)
- Shin Godzilla (2016, co-produced with Toho Pictures; uncredited)
- Shin Ultraman (2022, co-produced with Tsuburaya Productions and Toho Pictures)
- Shin Kamen Rider (2023, co-produced with Toei Company; uncredited)

=== Video games ===
- Fire Emblem Echoes: Shadows of Valentia (2017)
- Ace Combat 7: Skies Unknown (2019)
- Romeo Is a Dead Man (2026)
- Deltarune Chapter 5 (2026)

== Intellectual properties owned by Studio Khara ==
Original

- The Dragon Dentist

Owned from P Productions

- Bouken Rockbat
- Denjin Zaborger
- Lion-Maru trilogy
  - Fuun Lion-Maru
  - Kaiketsu Lion-Maru
  - Lion-Maru G
- Gokemidoro
- The Monster Prince
- Spectreman
- Tetsujin Tiger Seven

Other

- Neon Genesis Evangelion (owned from Gainax)
  - Rebuild of Evangelion
- Shin Japan Heroes Universe
  - Godzilla (owned from Toho)
  - Ultraman (owned from Tsuburaya Productions)
  - Kamen Rider (owned from Toei Company)
