= List of ninja television programs =

The following is a list of ninja television series and television episodes.

== Japanese television ==
=== Jidai-geki ===
Jidai-geki (時代劇), which literally means "period drama", is a genre of film, television, and theatre in Japan whose stories are historical dramas set prior to, during, or shortly after the Edo period of Japanese history, from 1603 to 1868.
Series	Air Dates
Sarutobi Sasuke Travel Diary (猿飛佐助旅日記)	1955.10.16 – 1956.12.23
Ninjutsu at Sanada Castle (忍術真田城)	1957.07.03 – 1957.12.25
Zeeroku Bushidō Zeeroku Bushidō (上方武士道) Zeeroku Bushidō (上方武士道)	1961.01.03 – 1961.06.27; 1969.04.06 – 1969.07.27
Ninja Series (忍者シリーズ)	1961.05.07 – 1961.05.28
Warrior of the Wind (風の武士)	1960.06.06 – 1961.02.27
Tenka no Abarenbō: Sarutobi Sasuke (天下の暴れん坊 猿飛佐助)	1961.01.03 – 1961.06.27
Invincible Sanada Ten Braves (無敵真田十勇士)	1961.10.06 – 1962.03.30
Sanada's Three Musketeers (真田三銃士)	1962.10.05 – 1963.03.29
The Samurai (隠密剣士)	1963.01.06 – 1965.03.28
Ninja Spy (忍びの者)	1964.07.24 – 1965.07.30
Yagyu Bugeichō (柳生武芸帳)	1965.01.10 – 1965.07.04
Edo Ninpō-chō (江戸忍法帖)	1966.04.10 – 1966.07.03
Sengoku Taiheiki Sanada Yukimura (戦国太平記 真田幸村)	1966.10.24 – 1967.10.16
Hayato (はやと)	1969.01.01 – 1969.03.26
Yōjutsu Bugeichō (妖術武芸帳)	1969.03.16 – 1969.06.08
Ōedo Sōsamō Ōedo Sōsamō (大江戸捜査網) Shin Ōedo Sōsamō (新・大江戸捜査網) Ōedo Sōsamō (大江戸捜査網)	1970.10.03 – 1984.03.31; 1984.04.07 – 1984.09.29; 1990.10.12 – 1992.03.27
Shadow Assassins (忍法かげろう斬り)	1972.04.04 – 1972.09.26
Nekketsu Sarutobi Sasuke (熱血猿飛佐助)	1972.10.09 – 1973.04.09
Lone Wolf and Cub Lone Wolf and Cub (子連れ狼) Lone Wolf and Cub (子連れ狼)	1973.04.01 – 1976.09.26; 2002.10.14 – 2004.09.13
Mushuku Zamurai (無宿侍)	1973.10.06 – 1973.12.29
Bounty Hunter (賞金稼ぎ)	1975.04.06 – 1975.10.05
Tokugawa Sangokushi (徳川三国志)	1975.10.22 – 1976.04.21
Gokaidō Masshigura! (五街道まっしぐら!)	1976.10.16 – 1976.12.25
The Yagyu Conspiracy (柳生一族の陰謀)	1978.10.03 – 1979.06.26
Shadow Warriors Shadow Warriors (服部半蔵 影の軍団) Shadow Warriors II (影の軍団 II) Shadow Warriors III (影の軍団 III) Shadow Warriors IV (影の軍団 IV) Shadow Warriors: End of an Era (影の軍団 幕末編)	1980.04.01 – 1980.09.30; 1981.10.06 – 1982.03.30; 1982.04.06 – 1982.09.28; 1985.04.02 – 1985.10.01; 1985.10.07 – 1985.12.30
Fūjin no Mon (風神の門)	1980.04.09 – 1980.10.01
Sarutobi Sasuke (猿飛佐助)	1980.05.11 – 1980.10.05
Yagyu Abaretabi Yagyu Abaretabi (柳生あばれ旅) Yagyu Jubei Abaretabi (柳生十兵衛あばれ旅)	1980.10.14 – 1981.04.07; 1982.10.19 – 1983.04.26
Sanada Taiheiki (真田太平記)	1985.04.03 – 1986.03.19
Onmitsu: Oku no Hosomichi (隠密・奥の細道)	1988.10.14 – 1989.03.31
Fūun! Sanada Yukimura (風雲！真田幸村)	1989.04.14 – 1989.09.29
Shōgun Iemitsu Shinobi Tabi (将軍家光忍び旅)	1990.10.13 – 1993.03.20
Mito Kōmon Gaiden: Kagerō Ninpō-chō (水戸黄門外伝 かげろう忍法帖)	1995.05.22 – 1995.09.04
Shōgun no Onmitsu! Kage Jūhachi (将軍の隠密!影十八)	1996.01.27 – 1996.06.29
Sarutobi Sansei (猿飛三世)	2012.10.12 – 2012.11.30
My Wife is a Female Ninja (妻は、くノ一)	2013.04.05 – 2014.06.20
Neko Ninja (猫忍)	2017.01.04 – 2017.03.15
Kunoichi Ninpocho Hotarubi (くノ一忍法帖 蛍火)	2018.04.03 – 2018.09.11
Episodes	Air Dates
Naoki Prize Series (直木賞シリーズ) Castle of Owls Part 1 (梟の城 前編) Castle of Owls Part 2 (梟の城 中編) Castle of Owls Part 3 (梟の城 後編)	1960.04.04; 1960.04.11; 1960.04.18

=== Gendai-geki ===
Gendai-geki (現代劇), which literally means "modern drama", is a genre of film, television, and theater in Japan whose stories are contemporary dramas set in the modern world.
Series	Air Dates
Phantom Agents Phantom Agents (忍者部隊月光) New Phantom Agents (新忍者部隊月光)	1964.01.03 – 1966.03.31; 1966.07.03 – 1966.10.02
Sukeban Deka III: Ninja Girl Romance (スケバン刑事III 少女忍法帖伝奇)	1986.10.30 – 1987.10.29
Naka Naka! Dojirangu (なかなか!ドジラんぐ)	1987.07.04 – 1987.09.26
Fūma no Kojirō (風魔の小次郎)	2007.10.03 – 2007.12.26
Marriage is Difficult for a Ninja (忍者に結婚は難しい)	2023.01.05 – 2023.03.16
House of Ninjas (忍びの家)	2024.02.15 –

=== Tokusatsu ===
Tokusatsu (特撮), which literally means "special filming", is a Japanese term for live-action film or television drama that makes heavy use of special effects. Tokusatsu entertainment often deals with science fiction, fantasy or horror, but can also include kaiju, superhero, metal hero, mecha, and super sentai.
Series	Air Dates
Ninja Hattori-kun Ninja Hattori-kun (忍者ハットリくん) Ninja Hattori-kun + Ninja Monster Zippo (忍者ハットリくん+忍者怪獣ジッポウ)	1966.04.07 – 1966.09.28; 1967.08.03 – 1968.01.25
Masked Ninja Akakage (仮面の忍者 赤影) [Edo period series]	1967.04.05 – 1968.03.27
Henshin Ninja Arashi (変身忍者 嵐) [Edo period henshin series based on the manga of the same name]	1972.04.07 – 1973.02.23
Lion-Maru Kaiketsu Lion-Maru (快傑ライオン丸 Fuun Lion-Maru (風雲ライオン丸) Lion-Maru G (ライオン丸G)	1972.04.01 – 1973.04.07; 1973.04.14 – 1973.09.29; 2006.10.01 – 2006.12.24
Majin Hunter Mitsurugi (魔人ハンター ミツルギ) [Edo period series]	1973.01.08 – 1973.03.26
Yūbae Sakusen (夕ばえ作戦)	1974.01.14 – 1974.01.23
Ninja Captor (忍者キャプター)	1976.04.07 – 1977.01.26
Message from Space: Galactic Wars (宇宙からのメッセージ 銀河大戦)	1978.07.08 – 1979.01.27
MegaBeast Investigator Juspion (巨獣特捜ジャスピオン)	1985.03.15 – 1986.03.24
Sekai Ninja Sen Jiraiya (世界忍者戦ジライヤ)	1988.01.24 – 1989.01.22
Super Sentai Ninja Sentai Kakuranger (忍者戦隊カクレンジャー ) Ninpū Sentai Hurricaneger (忍風戦隊ハリケンジャー) Shuriken Sentai Ninninger (手裏剣戦隊ニンニンジャー)	1994.02.18 – 1995.02.24; 2002.02.17 – 2003.02.09; 2015.02.22 – 2016.02.07
Ninja Spirits (忍者スピリット)	2010.03.30 - 2010.05.11
Divine Retribution: Punisher of Darkness (天誅～闇の仕置人～)	2014.01.24 – 2014.03.14
Musashi Ninpō-den Ninja Reppū (武蔵忍法伝 忍者烈風)	2015.07.04 – 2017.03.04
Episodes	Air Dates
Kikaider 01 (キカイダー01) "Strange 4th Dimension: Terrifying Trip Through Time" (四次元の怪 恐怖のタイム旅行)	1974.01.19

=== Anime ===
Anime (アニメ) is all forms of animated media featuring hand-drawn and computer animation originating from or associated with Japan. The word anime is the Japanese term for animation.
Series	Air Dates
Fujimaru of the Wind (少年忍者 風のフジ丸)	1964.06.07 – 1965.08.31
Sasuke (サスケ)	1968.09.03 – 1969.03.25
The Legend of Kamui (忍風カムイ外伝)	1969.04.06 – 1969.09.28
Science Ninja Team Gatchaman Science Ninja Team Gatchaman (科学忍者隊ガッチャマン) Gatchaman II (科学忍者隊ガッチャマンII) Gatchaman Fighter (科学忍者隊ガッチャマンF(ファイター))	1972.10.01 – 1974.09.29; 1978.10.01 – 1979.09.23; 1979.10.07 – 1980.08.31
Manga Sarutobi Sasuke (まんが猿飛佐助)	1979.10.09 – 1980.04.15
Ninja Hattori-kun Ninja Hattori-kun (忍者ハットリくん) Ninja Hattori-kun Returns (忍者ハットリくん)	1981.09.28 – 1987.12.25; 2013.05.13 – 2015.02.16
Sasuga no Sarutobi (さすがの猿飛)	1982.10.17 – 1984.03.11
Igano Kabamaru (伊賀野カバ丸)	1983.10.20 – 1984.03.29
Ninja Robots (忍者戦士飛影)	1985.10.06 – 1986.07.13
Legendary Ninja Cats (キャッ党忍伝てやんでえ) [aka Samurai Pizza Cats]	1990.02.01 – 1991.02.12
Raven Tengu Kabuto (鴉天狗カブト)	1990.07.29 – 1991.06.30
Nintama Rantarō (忍たま乱太郎)	1993.04.10 – present
Legend of the Mystical Ninja (アニメがんばれゴエモン)	1997.10.04 – 1998.03.28
Flame of Recca (烈火の炎)	1997.07.19 – 1998.07.10
Jubei-chan: The Ninja Girl Jubei-chan: The Secret of the Lovely Eyepatch (十兵衛ちゃん -ラブリー眼帯の秘密-) Jubei-chan 2: The Counter Attack of Siberia Yagyu (十兵衛ちゃん2 -シベリア柳生の逆襲-)	1999.04.05 – 1999.06.28; 2004.01.07 – 2004.03.31
Samurai Girl: Real Bout High School	2001.07.30 – 2001.10.22
Naruto Naruto (NARUTO－ナルト－) Naruto: Shippuden (NARUTO－ナルト－疾風伝)	2002.10.03 – 2007.02.08; 2007.02.15 – 2017.03.23
Ninja Scroll: The Series (獣兵衛忍風帖 龍宝玉篇)	2003.04.14 – 2003.07.14
Ninja Nonsense (ニニンがシノブ伝)	2004.07.08 – 2004.09.23
Basilisk Basilisk: The Kōga Ninja Scrolls (バジリスク 〜甲賀忍法帖〜) Basilisk: The Ōka Ninja Scrolls (バジリスク 〜桜花忍法帖〜)	2005.04.12 – 2005.09.20; 2018.01.08 – 2018.06.18
The King of Fighters The King of Fighters: Another Day The King of Fighters: Destiny [CG animated web series]	2005.12.02 – 2006.03.03; 2017.08.03 – 2018.01.08
Guardian Ninja Mamoru (陰からマモル)	2006.01.07 – 2006.03.25
Himawari! Himawari! (ひまわりっ!) Himawari Too!! (ひまわりっ!!)	2006.04.08 – 2006.07.01; 2007.01.06 – 2007.03.31
Brave 10	2012.01.08 – 2012.03.25
Ninja Slayer From Animation [web anime series]	2015.04.16 – 2015.10.08
Cocotama Kamisama Minarai: Himitsu no Cocotama (かみさまみならい ヒミツのここたま) Kira Kira Happy Hirake! Cocotama (キラキラハッピー★ひらけ！ここたま) Mono no Kamisama Cocotama (モノのかみさま ここたま) [web anime series]	2015.10.05 – 2018.08.05; 2018.06.09 – 2019.09.26; 2019.09.26 – 2020.02.21
Ninja Collection (忍者コレクション)	2020.07.12 – 2020.10.26
Ninja Kamui	2024.02.11 –
Episodes	Air Dates
Planetes (プラネテス) "The Lunar Flying Squirrels" (月のムササビ) "Exposure" (暴露)	2003.11.08; 2014.03.13

=== Ningyō-geki ===
Ningyō-geki (人形劇) is a genre of film, television, and theater in Japan that involves the manipulation of puppets – inanimate objects, often resembling some type of human or animal figure, that are animated or manipulated by a human called a puppeteer.
Series	Air Dates
Sarutobi Sasuke (猿飛佐助)	1953.11.18 – 1953.12.30

=== Kōdan ===
Kōdan (講談), formerly known as kōshaku (講釈), is a style of traditional oral Japanese storytelling usually performed sitting behind a desk or lectern, and using wooden clappers or a fan to mark the rhythm of the recitation. This derives from the origin of the art form in cultural, literary or historical lectures given in the Heian period courts.
Series	Air Dates
Sarutobi Sasuke (猿飛佐助)	1963.01.09 – 1963.01.30

== American television ==
=== Action ===
Action is a genre in which the protagonist or protagonists are thrust into a series of events that typically include violence, extended fighting, physical feats, and frantic chases.
Series	Air Dates
The Master	1984.01.20 – 1984.08.31
Raven	1992.06.19 – 1993.04.30
Samurai Girl [mini-series]	2008.09.05 – 2008.09.07
Episodes	Air Dates
Hawaii Five-O "To Hell with Babe Ruth"	1969.10.01
Kung Fu "The Assassin" "Blood of the Dragon"	1973.10.04; 1974.09.14
Baretta "The Ninja"	1976.09.22
Quincy, M.E. "Touch of Death"	1977.12.02
CHiPs "Force Seven"	1982.05.23
Magnum P.I. "The Arrow That is Not Aimed"	1983.01.27
Masquerade "Girls for Sale"	1983.12.29
Simon & Simon "Harm's Way" "Opposites Attack"	1984.03.01; 1987.01.29
Sidekicks "The Boy Who Saw Too Much"	1987.01.10
Martial Law "Bad Seed" "This Shogun For Hire"	1998.12.12; 1999.10.09
She Spies "Fondles"	2002.10.21
Days of Our Lives "Episode #9729" "Episode #9895"	2004.01.15; 2004.09.23
Katana "Pilot"	2009.01.07
Castle "The Way of the Ninja"	2014.03.17

=== Speculative fiction ===
Speculative fiction is an umbrella genre encompassing fiction with certain elements that do not exist in the real world, often in the context of supernatural, futuristic or other imaginative themes. This includes, but is not limited to, science fiction, fantasy, horror, superhero fiction, utopian and dystopian fiction, fairytale fantasy, supernatural fiction as well as combinations thereof (e.g. science fantasy).
Series	Air Dates
Power Rangers Mighty Morphin Power Rangers (season 3) Power Rangers Ninja Storm Power Rangers Ninja Steel Power Rangers Super Ninja Steel	1995.09.02 – 1995.11.27; 1996.02.05 – 1996.02.17; 2003.02.15 – 2003.11.15; 2017.01.21 – 2017.12.02; 2018.01.27 – 2018.12.01
Ninja Turtles: The Next Mutation	1997.09.12 – 1998.03.20
Mortal Kombat Mortal Kombat: Conquest Mortal Kombat: Legacy	1998.10.03 – 1999.05.22; 2011.04.11 – 2013.09.26
Blood of the Samurai Blood of the Samurai: The Series Ninja EX	2004.01.25 – 2004.02.29; 2004.11.04 – 2005.03.10
Supah Ninjas	2011.01.17 – 2013.04.27
Daredevil and Elektra Daredevil The Defenders	2015.04.10 – 2018.10.19; 2017.08.18 – 2017.08.18
Ninjak vs. the Valiant Universe [Web television series]	2018.04.21 – 2018.04.26
Naruto: Climbing Silver [Web television series based on the Naruto manga.]	2021.03.18 –
Episodes	Air Dates
The Greatest American Hero "Thirty Seconds Over Little Tokyo"	1983.02.03
Knight Rider "Knight and Knerd" "Knight of the Rising Sun"	1985.03.17; 1986.03.14
My Secret Identity "The Eyes of the Shadow"	1989.01.28
Power Rangers Mighty Morphin Power Rangers (season 1) "Dark Warrior" "Gung Ho!" "Calamity Kimberly" Mighty Morphin Power Rangers (season 2) "The Ninja Encounter (1)" "The Ninja Encounter (2)" "The Ninja Encounter (3)" Power Rangers Zeo "Game of Honor" Power Rangers in Space "Save Our Ship" "Shell Shocked" Power Rangers Wild Force "The Master's Herald, Part 1" "The Master's Herald, Part 2" Power Rangers Dino Thunder "Thunder Storm, Part 1" "Thunder Storm, Part 2"	1993.09.28; 1993.11.04; 1993.11.11 1994.11.02; 1994.11.03; 1994.11.04 1996.09.16 1998.02.20; 1998.02.27 2002.10.19; 2002.10.19 2004.10.02; 2004.10.09
Charmed "Awakened"	2000.02.03
Arrow "League of Assassins"	2013.11.06
Teen Wolf "Illuminated" "Silverfinger" "Riddled" "Letharia Vulpina" "De-Void" "Insatiable" "The Divine Move" "Codominance"	2014.01.27; 2014.02.03; 2014.02.10; 2014.02.17; 2014.03.10; 2014.03.17; 2014.03.24; 2016.01.19
Legends of Tomorrow "Shogun"	2016.10.27

=== Parody ===
A parody, also called a spoof, send-up, take-off, lampoon, play on (something), caricature, or joke, is a work created to imitate, make fun of, or comment on an original work—its subject, author, style, or some other target—by means of satiric or ironic imitation.
Series	Air Dates
Ninja the Mission Force	2012.02.15 – 2013.03.22
Ninja Kidz TV	2017.03.30 – present
Episodes	Air Dates
Soap "Episode 81"	1981.03.09
Moonlighting "Atomic Shakespeare"	1986.11.25
Perfect Strangers "The Karate Kids"	1987.11.11
Danger Theatre "Lethal Luau"	1993.07.11
Spin City "Minor League"	2001.05.02
That '70s Show "Jackie Moves On"	2000.04.03
The Hughleys "Whatchoo Stalkin' About, Willis?"	2001.10.29
My Name is Earl "Creative Writing"	2007.10.18
Chuck "Chuck Versus the Intersect"	2007.09.24
Wizards of Waverly Place "Baby Cupid"	2008.12.14
How I Met Your Mother "Mosbius Designs" "The Broath"	2009.04.13; 2012.03.19
NTSF:SD:SUV:: "The Return of Dragon Shumway"	2012.10.05
It's Always Sunny in Philadelphia "The Gang Saves the Day"	2013.10.09
Parks and Recreation "The Johnny Karate Super Awesome Musical Explosion Show"	2015.02.17

=== Animation ===
Animation is a method in which figures are manipulated to appear as moving images. In traditional animation, images are drawn or painted by hand on transparent celluloid sheets to be photographed and exhibited on film. Today, most animations are made with computer-generated imagery (CGI).
Series	Air Dates
G-Force [Adaptations of the anime series Science Ninja Team Gatchaman] Battle of the Planets G-Force: Guardians of Space	1978.09.12 – 1980.05.12; 1986
G.I. Joe G.I. Joe: A Real American Hero G.I. Joe: A Real American Hero G.I. Joe Extreme G.I. Joe: Sigma 6 G.I. Joe: Resolute G.I. Joe: Renegades	1983.09.12 – 1986.11.20; 1989.09.02 – 1992.01.20; 1995.09.24 – 1997.02.21; 2005.09.10 – 2006.10.28; 2009.04.17 – 2009.04.25; 2010.11.26 – 2011.07.23
Teenage Mutant Ninja Turtles Teenage Mutant Ninja Turtles Teenage Mutant Ninja Turtles Teenage Mutant Ninja Turtles Rise of the Teenage Mutant Ninja Turtles Tales of the Teenage Mutant Ninja Turtles	1987.12.14 – 1996.11.02; 2003.02.08 – 2010.03.27; 2012.09.28 – 2017.11.12; 2018.07.20 – 2020.08.07; 2024.08.09 – 2025.12.12
Mortal Kombat: Defenders of the Realm	1996.09.21 – 1996.12.14
Batman Beyond	1999.01.10 – 2001.12.18
Randy Cunningham: 9th Grade Ninja	2012.08.13 – 2015.07.27

== International television ==
=== Action ===
Series	Country	Air Dates
Red Eagle (Águila Roja)	Spain	2009.02.19 – 2016.10.27
The Way	France	2017.07.21
Episodes	Country	Air Dates
Queen of Swords "The Dragon"	Canada / Spain / UK	2001.05.19

=== Animation ===
Series	Country	Air Dates
Shuriken School	France / Spain	2006.08.20 – 2007.12.22
LEGO Ninjago	Denmark / Canada	2011.01.14 – 2022.10.01
Hello Ninja	United States / Canada	2019.11.01 - 2021.01.19

== Chinese television ==
=== Wuxia ===
Wuxia (武俠), which literally means "martial heroes", is a genre of Chinese fiction concerning the adventures of martial artists in ancient China. In the case of Wuxia featuring ninja, they also sometimes take place partially in Japan prior to, during, or shortly after the Edo period of Japanese history, from 1603 to 1868.
Series	Air Dates
Ninja: The Final Duel (忍者決戦少林 忍者在中國)	1986
The Royal Swordsmen (天下第一)	2005.01.30 – 2005
Southern Shaolin (南少林荡倭英豪)	2013.02.13 – 2013

=== Wushu ===
Wushu (武術), which literally means "martial arts" in both Chinese and Japanese (where 武術 is read as Bujutsu), is an umbrella term for the several hundred fighting styles that have developed over the centuries in China. In the case of Wushu featuring ninja, it also encompasses the Japanese martial arts (Bujutsu) meaning and refers to martial arts, chop socky, and kung fu programs produced by companies from Hong Kong, Taiwan, and China, whose stories are contemporary dramas set in the modern world.
Series	Air Dates
Ninja Kids (鬼面忍者) [aka Ninja Death] [aka Venom of the Ninja]	1982
Mafia vs Ninja (洪門小子)	1984
The Street-Market Ninja (街市忍者)	1990

== South Korean television ==
=== Sageuk ===
Sageuk (史劇) in Korean denotes historical dramas, including traditional drama plays, films or television series. In English language literature sageuk usually refers to historical films and television series of South Korea.
Series	Air Dates
The Kingdom of the Winds (바람의 나라)	2008.09.10 – 2009.01.15
The Return of Iljimae (돌아온 一枝梅)	2009.01.21 – 2009.04.09

== See also ==
- List of ninja films
- List of ninja video games
- Ninja in popular culture
