= Karate-Robo Zaborgar =

2011 film by Noboru Iguchi

- Film poster
- Directed by: Noboru Iguchi
- Screenplay by: Noboru Iguchi
- Based on: Denjin Zaborger by P Productions
- Produced by: Shinichi Ikeda; Yoshinori Chiba
- Starring: Itsuji Itao
- Cinematography: Yasutaka Nagano
- Edited by: Tsuyoshi Wada
- Music by: Shunsuke Kikuchi
- Production companies: Sushi Typhoon; King Records; T-Joy
- Distributed by: Nikkatsu
- Release dates: January 28, 2011 (Rotterdam); October 15, 2011 (Japan)
- Running time: 114 minutes
- Country: Japan
- Language: Japanese
- Budget: $3 million
- Box office: $162,288

Karate-Robo Zaborgar (Japanese: 電人ザボーガー, Hepburn: Denjin Zabōgā) is a 2011 Japanese film directed by Noboru Iguchi. The film is a remake of the 1974 show Denjin Zaborger.

== Plot ==
An evil criminal organisation called Sigma kidnap prominent business leaders to harvest their DNA and only Karate-Robo Zaborgar can save them.

== Production ==
While working on his television series The Ancient Dogoo Girl in 2009, director Noboru Iguchi said his producer approached him with news that the film adaptation rights for a number of tokusatsu had become available. Iguchi found that the rights to the 1970s series Denjin Zaborger was available and suggested that he could make a remake of the series into a film.

Iguchi said that compared to his previous feature film works, he had a larger budget and filming schedule to crate Karate-Robo Zaborgar. He said that the film was shot in 26 days, which was shorter than the average Japanese production, but much longer than his previous films The Machine Girl or RoboGeisha which were each shot in about 12 days. Iguchi said the budget for Karate-Robo Zaborgar was "about $3 million" as opposed to the few hundred thousand used for the earlier films.

== Cast ==
- Itsuji Itao as Yutaka Daimon
- Yasuhisa Furuhara as Younger Yutaka Daimon
- Mami Yamasaki as Miss Borg
- Yuya Miyashita as Gen Akizuki
- Aimi Satsukawa as Akiko/Lady Borg
- Demo Tanaka as Detective Nakano
- Kentaro Kishi as Detective Matsue
- Kentaro Shimazu as Minister Murata
- Sakichi Sato as Elek Andes
- Arata Yamanaka as Apache Drill
- Yuya Ishikawa as Eyepatch Baron
- Yuya Matsuura as Burner 8
- Hiroaki Murakami as King Africa
- Asami as Rugger Red
- Cay Izumi as Rugger Blue
- Yui Murata as Rugger Yellow
- Shoichiro Tanigawa as Diet Member Yonekura
- Sakiko Takao as Yumi
- Jyubei Ikeguchi and Hideo Asayama as Secretaries
- Yoshikazu Kawabuchi as Police officer
- Yoshihiro Nishimura as Karate master
- Takehiko Watanabe as Radio voice
- Houka Kinoshita as Diet Member Wakasugi
- Satoru Matsuo as Official
- Tomokazu Seki as Employment security office staff member
- Shoichiro Masumoto as Worker
- Eiichi Kikuchi as Aged Yutaka Daimon
- Hiroyuki Watanabe as Chief Inspector Goro Nitta
- Naoto Takenaka as Dr. Isamu Daimon
- Akira Emoto as Dr. Akunomiya

== Release ==
Karate-Robo Zaboragar had its world premiere at the 2011 International Film Festival Rotterdam.

The international versions of the film are shorter than the Japanese cut. Producer Yoshinori Chiba of Sushi Typhoon told Iguchi to cut the sex scenes or any overtly violent scenes. This was due to the film being sold to distributors in China, who would cut these scenes regardless which led to the production saving money by making one international edit of the film.

== Reception ==
John Anderson of Variety said the film aimed to be both cheesy and sublime, which he found it "mostly accomplishes" do the special effects work of Yoshihiro Nishimura and Tsuyoshi Kazuno and the "terrific editing" by Takeshi Wada. It was later shown in New York at the New York Asian Film Festival in 2011.
