= Kaiketsu =

Kaiketsu may refer to:

- Kaiketsu Zorori, a Japanese children's book series
- Kaiketsu Zubat, a tokusatsu superhero series
- Kaiketsu Noutenki, a series of fan film parodies of the above
- Kaiketsu Lion-Maru, another tokusatsu series
- Kaiketsu Zorro, a Japanese anime
- Kaiketsu, a 1947 Japanese film with cinematography by Yoshio Miyajima
- Kaiketsu Masateru (born 1948), Japanese former sumo wrestler
