= Lion-Maru G =

- The logo for Lion-Maru G flanked by Lion-Maru and Tiger Joe
- Genre: Tokusatsu; Superhero fiction Action/Adventure; Fantasy; Black comedy
- Created by: Koji Bessho, Tomio Sagisu
- Country of origin: Japan
- No. of episodes: 13

Production
- Producer: P Productions
- Running time: 25 minutes

Original release
- Network: TXN
- Release: October 1 – December 24, 2006

Related
- Fuun Lion-Maru

Lion-Maru G (ライオン丸Ｇ, Raionmaru Jī) is a Japanese tokusatsu series that aired from October 1, 2006 to December 24, 2006 in Japan, lasting 13 episodes. It is the third part in the Lion-Maru trilogy, following Kaiketsu Lion-Maru and Fuun Lion-Maru. The "G" is short for 'Ghetto' or alternatively "Gigolo".This Lion-Maru is called "the Beast Transformed Gigolo Warrior".

== Story ==
The story is set in the year 2011 in Neo-Kabukichō, a fictitious version of the real red-light district of Shinjuku, Tokyo. A wave of violent crimes is being caused by a new contact lens drug called "Skull Eyes", enabling people to become superhumans called Kabukimono. It follows the story of the reincarnated Lion-Maru and Tiger Joe from the original Kaiketsu Lion-Maru.

== Characters ==
Shishimaru (獅子丸)
A happy-go-lucky guy who is both a cowardly louse and a girl crazy gigolo, working at the Dreamin' night club. However, Shishimaru is in a slump from being the worst host to owing 30,000 Yen to Junior. While forced as Swankee bait pay a bit of his debt to Junior, Shishimaru finds out he is a reincarnation of the original Lion-Maru (ライオン丸, Raionmaru), unsheathing the katana Kinsachi (キンサチ) to take on the power. He owns a modified Suzuki Burgman that he calls "Hikarimaru," the name of the Pegasus ridden by Lion-Maru in Kaiketsu Lion-Maru. Soon after Gosan's destruction, the experience from the events in the final battle changing him into a more serious man, Shishimaru disappears and becomes an urban legend.

Jonosuke Tora (虎 錠之介, Tora Jōnosuke)
A freelance thug for Gousan who is the reincarnation of the original Tiger Joe (タイガージョー, Taigā Jō), called "Joe" for short. Though he sees Shishimaru as a rival, he is flustered that he is coward. He acts cold towards other people because his family members were murdered when he was at a young age. However, after being kissed by Saori, Jonosuke begins to warm up. He transforms with the mysterious sword Ginsachi (ギンサチ). He remains very loyal to only Gousan, who took him in after the loss of his family, until Kashinkoji reveals that it was Gousan who was behind his parents' demise. In the end, losing his virginity to Saori prior, Jonosuke sacrificed himself to destroy Gousan.

Saori (サオリ)
Saori is a busty mizu shobai girl who works in Neo-Kabukichō and also owes Junior money because of her host addiction, forced to work with Shishimaru during the Swankees incident. She is very similar to the original Saori, helping the current Lionmaru while falling in love with Jonosuke. In the series finale, Saori retired from her job to become a nun while bearing Jonosuke's child.

Kosu K (コスK, Kosu Kei)
Her real name being Kaori and going by a pen name as a journalist at Neo-Kabukicho magazine, Kosu K is a 14-year-old girl and Saori's younger sister. Though she didn't believe it at first, she ends up being thrust into Shishimaru's misadventure. In the end, she wrote all the events into a novel.

Kashinkoji (果心居士)
Kashinkoji is an old homeless man who gives Kinsachi to Shishimaru. He is very knowledgeable about Lionmaru. He and Gousan seem to have known each other from long ago. Kashinkoji acts from the shadows until the final battle is about to begin, mortally wounded by Liontiger to steal back Kinsachi and Ginsachi and later saving Saori from the Shadows. Finding Gousan, Kashikoji battles him before being fatally wounded. Making his way to Shishimaru and Jonosuke, he tells them to join forces before he dies.

Junior (ジュニア, Junia; 1-12)
His real name unknown, Junior is the Junior CEO of Gousan Enterprises, to which Shishimaru and Saori owe money. He is the son of Gousan, wearing hardcore cosplay outfits he made himself to receive his father's attention on him instead of Jonosuke and Shishimaru. This inferiority complex leads him to convince Saori to steal Kinsachi. But when Makage interferes, Junior loses it and confronts his father before attempting to kill him. However, it ends with Gosan killing him.

Gousan (豪山, Gōsan)
Gousan is the boss of Gousan Enterprises, wearing a cap to conceal his rainbow-pupilled third eye. He creates the Skull Eyes, using the residents of NeoKabukicho to perfect his mind control Akaao contact lens before sending them across the country in a scheme to take it over. He seems to know a lot about Kinsachi and Ginsachi, and desires to gain possession of the mysterious swords. When Shishimaru and Jonosuke leave town, Gousan arranges his forces to kill everyone dear to Shishimaru. Eventually, despite overpowering them, Gousan is destroyed in Joe's suicide attack.

Shadows
Gousan's ninja minions.

Makoto Makage/Shishitora (真影/シシトラ, 10-12)
An agent of Gousan who is sent to kill Shishimaru and Jonosuke and steal both Kinsachi and Ginsachi. Infiltrating Dreamin' and given the host name Kagemaru (影丸, Kagemaru), Makage keeps an eye on Shishimaru. After beating Jonosuke to a blooding pulp to get Ginsachi, Makage uses it and the stolen Kinsachi to become Lion-Tiger (ライオンタイガー, Raiontaigā). Though he manages to mortally would Kashinkoji, Makage is unable to endure the combined powers of the blades.

Master (マスター, Masutā)
He is a master of Snack Z, rarely talking and knows what's going on in Neo-Kabukicho and was Yuri's mentor. He ends up dying while fighting off the Shadows.
Ozaki
Kaori's teacher, though he acts weird. He gets kills by the Shadows.
Animaru
The owner of Dreamin' who took Shishimaru in out of pity. Though he survived an attempt on his life by the Shadows, he is not lucky a second time
Ranmaru, Kyosuke, and Akira
Shishimaru's coworkers at Dreamin'. They get killed by the Shadows.
Haruna and Haruka
Sex-crazy customers who victimize Shishimaru with their creepy advances. They get killed by the Shadows.

Swankees (1-2)
A Kabukimono baseball team who use sign language to communicate. Targeting gigolos and hookers, Junior uses Shishimaru and Saori as bait to have Jonosuke deal with them. But when Shishimaru becomes Lionmaru, Jonosuke hires them kill off him. After the Swankees tear Dreamin' apart to find him before kidnapping Saori and Kosu K to get him, the Swankees torture Shishimaru with a Bomb Ball-firing pitching machine. But once Shishimaru becomes Lionmaru, he single-handedly defeats them.
Toppogi (3-5)
A sadist in kung fu garb who is a former Gousan Enterprises member and loses his eye as a result after being manhandled by Jonosuke for embezzling. Desiring revenge as he resumes his Fake Skull Eye operation, Toppogi searches the user of Kinsachi to counter Gousan while having his men abduct Saori and Kaori with three other girls through a clothing store for slave trading. Once finding Shishimaru, Toppogi recruits him to be a hitman to take out Jonosuke. However, after Shishimaru runs off when he needs him, Toppogi resorts to using real Skull Eyes before Lionmaru intervenes and takes out his posse prior to killing him.
Youji Tokoto (6-7)
A man with a cheap unbendable prosthetic after he lost his pinkie for stealing from his own gang. After conning Junior's men out of five hundred pairs of Skull Eyes, Youji sells them to some punks. Though he takes Saori hostage, Youji ends up being captured by Joe's men.
Yuri (ユリ, Yuri; 8-9)
An old friend of Jonosuke who was his partner in Gousan Enterprises due to her supernatural powers. She later quit Gosan Enterprises and became a detective at Yokohama. However, out of impulse, Yuri ends up attacking Kabukimono. Eventually, she battles Tiger Joe while Lionmaru defeats her posse, the fight ending with Yuri allowing herself to be killed. However, her life is spared as she fakes amnesia while declared officially dead.

== Episodes ==
1. 2011 Neo-Kabukichō, Lion-Maru Transformed, Jōtai! (2011 NEO歌舞伎町 ライオン丸TRANSFORMED状態!, 2011 Neo Kabukichō Raionmaru TRANSFORMED Jōtai!)
2. Tiger Joe Comes, Undercover Samurai, Jōtai! (タイガーJOE推参 UNDERCOVER SAMURAI状態!, Taigā JOE Suisan UNDERCOVER SAMURAI Jōtai!)
3. Fake Skull Eye Incident Occurrence, Trouble Addict, Jōtai! (偽スカルアイ事件発生 TROUBLE ADDICT状態!, Nise Sukaruai Jiken Hassei TROUBLE ADDICT Jōtai!)
4. Darkness Ninja Shadow Appearance! Shishimaru Betrayal, Jōtai! (闇忍者シャドー出現! 獅子丸URAGIRI状態!, Yami Ninja Shadō Shutsugen! Shishimaru URAGIRI Jōtai!)
5. Lion-Maru vs. Tiger Joe Confrontation! Becoming Sharp, Jōtai! (ライオン丸VSタイガージョー決風! 鋭くなって状態!, Raionmaru VS Taigā Jō Keppū! Surudoku Natte Jōtai!)
6. Saori Counters Love! Love is Drunken Hearted, Jōtai! (サオリ発愛! 恋はDRUNKEN HEARTED状態!, Saori Hatsuai! Koi wa DRUNKEN HEARTED Jōtai!)
7. Furious Lion-Maru! Joe Cramp Discharger, Jōtai! (怒髪ライオン丸! JOE CRAMP DISCHARGER状態!, Dohatsu Raionmaru! JOE CRAMP DISCHARGER Jōtai!)
8. Pantheress Appearance! Yokohama Memories in My Head, Jōtai! (女豹登場! 横浜OMOIDE IN MY HEAD状態!, Mehyō Tōjō! Yokohama OMOIDE IN MY HEAD Jōtai!)
9. The Fate of the Chosen Ones! Destruction Baby, Jōtai! (選ばれし者たちの運命! DESTRUCTION BABY状態!, Erabareshi Monotachi no Sadame! DESTRUCTION BABY Jōtai!)
10. Love Attack Curry! Saori Breast Festival, Jōtai! (ラブアタックカレー! サオリPAIOTSU MATSURI状態!, Rabu Attakku Karē! Saori PAIOTSU MATSURI Jōtai!)
11. Monster Comes! His Name is Lion-Tiger Shishitora, Jōtai! (怪人光臨! その名もLION-TIGER獅子虎状態!, Kaijin Kōrin! Sono Na mo LION-TIGER Shishitora Jōtai!)
12. The Previous Night of Battle! Everybody is Crazy, Jōtai! (決戦前夜! えぶりぼでぃ誰もがCRAZY状態!, Kessen Zenya! Eburibodi Daremo ga CRAZY Jōtai!)
13. Explosion City is Full of Winds! I Love you, Sayonara, Jōtai! (爆裂シティは風だらけ! I Love you, SAYONARA状態!, Bakuretsu Shiti wa Kaze Darake! I Love you, SAYONARA Jōtai!)

Some of these episode titles are puns on the songs of a Japanese rock band, Number Girl.

== Cast ==
- Kazuki Namioka as Shishimaru
- Yasuomi Ohta as Jonosuke
- Emi Kobayashi as Saori
- Asami Oda as Kosu K
- Taka Okubo as Kashinkoji
- Kenichi Endō as Junior
- Renji Ishibashi as Gousan
- Ippei Hikaru as Master
- Yumi Shimizu as Yuri
- Mitsuru Karahashi as Makage

== Music ==
Opening Theme

- "Kaze yo Hikari yo" (風よ光よ; "Oh Wind, Oh Light") by Akira Kushida (串田 アキラ, Kushida Akira)

Closing Themes

- "Tori" (鳥; "Bird") by angela (Episodes 1 & 2)
- "Jinsei Yūgi" (人生遊戯; "Game of Life") by angela (Episodes 3-12)
- "Kaze yo Hikari yo" by Akira Kushida (Episode 13)

Preceded by Fuun Lion-Maru	Lion-Maru; 2006	Succeeded by N/A
