= Emi Kobayashi =

Japanese gravure idol (born 1983)

Emi Kobayashi (小林 恵美, Kobayashi Emi; born January 1, 1983) is a former Japanese gravure idol. She is from Tokyo, and belongs to the show-business production Suns Entertainment. She belonged to Yellow Cab before 2004. She portrayed the hostess who became a nun named Saori in Lion-Maru G.

== Career ==
Kobayashi graduated from Aoyama Gakuin Senior High School. As a freshman there, she was in the swimming club. She later earned a degree in management at Aoyama Gakuin University. When she belonged to Yellow Cab Kobayashi was a member of R.C.T. She was a defender for the futsal team Carezza, having uniform number 3.

She left the agency and retired from the entertainment industry on September 30, 2018.

== Activities ==
=== TV Programs ===
- Kyabutomushi, Chubu-Nippon Broadcasting
- Odaiba-kei Bikini de Manyumanyu, Fuji Satellite Broadcasting
- R# Room Number, TV Asahi 2003 R#216
  - Papa ni Onedari
  - Naku Hi
- Dokushin 3!!, TV Asahi 2003
- Hiroshi Sekiguchi no Friend Park II, TBS 2003-04
- Ken Shimura no Baka-tonosama, Fuji Television 2003
- Takajin no soko made Itte Iinkai, YTV
- Akko ni Omakase!, TBS
- Zettai Tsukaeru Drive Tour 3, NTV 2005
- Jichael Mackson, MBS 2005
- Uchimura Produce, TV Asahi 2005
- Quiz Presen' Variety Q-sama!!, TV Asahi 2005, 2006
- Mecha-Mecha Iketeru!, Fuji Television 2006
- Quiz! Hexagon II, Fuji Television 2006
- Do-tanki Tsumekomi Kyoiku! Gowan! Coaching!!, TV Tokyo 2006
- Konya mo Doll-bako!! R, TV Tokyo 2006
- KICK IN! GAROTAS FUTSAL TV, Fuji Satellite Broadcasting
- FNS 26 Jikan TV Kokumintekina Omoshirosa! Shijo Saidai!! Manatsu no Quiz Matsuri 26 Jikan Buttoshi Special "Hijoshiki wa Bishonure! Asa made Nep-league SP" 2006
- Saishu Keikoku! Takeshi no Hontou wa Kowai Katei no Igaku, ABC
- Lion-Maru G, TV Tokyo 2006
- Roshiago Kaiwa, NHK E 2007-

== Bibliography ==
=== Photobooks ===
- Satin Doll (サテンドール), Aqua House 2002
- AI, Compass 2002
- HAPPENING, Takeshobo 2003
- umiemi, Ongakusenkasha 2005
- Gekkan Emi Kobayashi (月刊 小林恵美), Shinchosha 2006
