= Tetsujin Tiger Seven =

- Also known as: Iron Man Tiger Seven
- Genre: Tokusatsu
- Created by: Souji Ushio; Takaharu Bessho
- Developed by: Shozo Uehara
- Directed by: Kanji Otsuka
- Starring: Tatsuya Nanjo; Shizuo Chujo; Junichi Tatsu; Hironori Sakuma; Yuka Kumari; Tomonori Yoshida
- Theme music composer: Shunsuke Kikuchi
- Opening theme: Tetsujin Tiger Seven
- Ending theme: Run Tiger Seven
- Country of origin: Japan
- Original language: Japanese
- No. of episodes: 26

Production
- Producer: Souji Ushio
- Running time: 25 minutes
- Production company: P Productions

Original release
- Network: Fuji Television
- Release: October 6, 1973 – March 30, 1974

Tetsujin Tiger Seven (鉄人タイガーセブン, Tetsujin Taigā Sebun), translated as Iron Man Tiger Seven, was a Japanese tokusatsu television series that broadcast on Fuji TV from October 6, 1973, to March 30, 1974, with a total of 26 episodes, produced by P Productions. Unlike Kaiketsu Lion-Maru and Fuun Lion-Maru, which focuses on cat-based ninja heroes in the feudal eras of Japan, this series is set in modern Japan. The international English title that P Productions refers to for overseas distribution is Tiger Seven.

Tetsujin Tiger Seven was apparently P Productions' attempt at a Kamen Rider style series. They even hired Shunsuke Kikuchi, music composer of the first eight Kamen Rider television series, to write the music for this series. However, it ended up being too dark and gritty for its time. This negatively impacted its ratings and led to the show's cancellation after 26 episodes.

== Plot ==
Takigawa Go gets the power to transform into Tetsujin Tiger Seven from an artificial heart and a magic pendant. To transform, he utters the henshin (transformation) phrase "Tiger Spark." Takigawa Go is played by Tatsuya Nanjô (who also starred in Henshin Ninja Arashi).

Go rides a Suzuki motorcycle with rocket boosters. When he transforms into Tiger Seven, the motorcycle transforms as well to become "Spike Go." Spike Go can drive itself, coming to its master's aid when Tiger Seven roars.

== Music ==
Opening Theme

- "Iron Man Tiger Seven" (Tetsujin Tiger Seven) music by Shunsuke Kikuchi, lyrics by Tomio Shinoda, vocals by Yuki Hide

Ending Theme

- "Run Tiger Seven" music by Shunsuke Kikuchi, lyrics by Tomio Shinoda, vocals by Columbia Cradle Club & Blue Angels

== Cast ==
- Takigawa Go/Iron Man Tiger Seven (voice): Tatsuya Nanjô
- Iron Man Tiger Seven (stunt actor): Kazuo Kamoshida
- Professor Takigawa: Shizuo Chujô
- Kitagawa Shiro: Shunichi Tatsu
- Sanpei Hayashi: Hironori Sakuma
- June Aoki: Yuka Kumari
- Jiro Aoki: Tomonori Yoshida
- Crown Prince Gill: Ryotaro Maki
- Crown Prince Gill (voice): Kiyoshi Kobayashi
- Black Mask: Masayoshi Kimizuka:
- Black Mask (voice): Hiroshi Masuoka
- Narrator: Masâki Okabe

== International broadcast and home video ==
- In its home country of Japan, a single VHS and Betamax tape was released by Toei Company under their Toei Video brand, including Episodes 1 and 9 in 1983. On February 22, 2002, Pioneer LDC released a DVD box set of the series that contained all 26 episodes of the series. Later on March 21, 2003, individual DVDs were also released by the company and split into six volumes. The first five volumes contained five episodes, while the final one contained two episodes.
- The series has aired in Italy with a full Italian dub and has aired on syndication across private local TV channels during the 1980s under the name Tiger Man.
