= Mystic Moods Orchestra =

American musical group

The Mystic Moods Orchestra
- Brad Miller in his studio.

Background information
- Origin: Burbank, California, U.S.
- Genres: Easy Listening
- Years active: 1966–1993
- Labels: Philips, Warner, Sound Bird, Mobile Fidelity Sound Lab, Bainbridge
- Past members: Brad Miller; Bud Shank; Ken Watson; Lincoln Mayorga; Vincent DeRosa

The Mystic Moods Orchestra was a group known for mixing orchestral pop, environmental sounds, and pioneering recording techniques. It was created by audiophile Brad Miller. The first Mystic Moods Orchestra album, One Stormy Night, was released in 1966 through the label Philips. Throughout the rest of the 1960s and 1970s, the group continued to release similar styled recordings and their recordings continued to be reissued throughout the 1980s and 1990s.

== History ==
Brad Miller was born in Burbank, California, and had developed an interest in railroading in his teens. After a few years of hanging around railyards and learning all the lore of steam and diesel engines, he decided to record the sounds of some of the last steam locomotives operating on a major rail line. Eventually, around 1958, he and his friend, Jim Connella, formed a company called Mobile Fidelity Records and started cutting records from these field recordings, which they released through railroading magazines and model train shows. Sound effects recording was quite the rage at the dawn of stereo, and one of these albums of train sounds was even reviewed favorably in High Fidelity magazine. A few years later, Ernie McDaniel of San Francisco radio station KFOG decided to put one of Miller's albums, Steam Railroading Under Thundering Skies, and an easy listening album, on separate turntables and broadcast them together. His late-night stunt produced a barrage of listener phone calls (most of which were positive), much to his surprise. He later related the episode to Miller, who was inspired by the idea.

While working with arranger Don Ralke, Miller recorded a series of tunes, most of them Ralke originals, played by a string-laden orchestra, then mixed in a variety of environmental sounds he had collected. He took several months fine-tuning the blend, then cut a deal with Philips to release it under the title of One Stormy Night, credited to the Mystic Moods Orchestra.

With the help of producer Leo Kulka, Miller quickly developed a series of albums similar to One Stormy Night: Nighttide, More Than Music, Mexican Trip, and Mystic Moods of Love, among others. Don Ralke wrote most of the material and did all the arrangements for the first few albums. John Tartalgia did a few more, then Larry Fotine became the primary arranger when Miller and Kulka moved to the Warner label. The musical content shifted to mellow covers of current hits ("Love the One You're With"), and Warner's modified the packaging of the albums to make sure there was no mystery that these were records to serve as the preamble or accompaniment to sexual intercourse. The 1974 release Erogenous came with an inner sleeve that, when pulled out, showed a nude couple in soft focus.

In 1974, Miller founded his own label, called Sound Bird Records, and reissued many of the Mystic Moods Orchestra albums, as well as albums of environmental sounds without music and more train recordings. Of note, the Sound Bird rereleases of the earlier albums also featured soft focus nude couples on the inner sleeve.

The backing track to the song "The First Day of Forever" off the album Awakening was used for the theme song of the American version of the Japanese superhero television show Spectreman.

== Discography ==
=== Studio albums ===
Title	Album details	Peak chart positions	
Title	Album details	US BB	US CB
One Stormy Night	Released: 1966; Label: Philips; Formats: LP; Reissues: 1972, Warner Bros., 1975, Sound Bird	63	62
Nightide	Released: 1966; Label: Philips; Formats: LP	110	98
More Than Music	Released: 1967; Label: Philips; Formats: LP	157	98
Mexican Trip	Released: 1967; Label: Philips; Formats: LP	164	—
Mystic Moods of Love	Released: 1968; Label: Philips; Formats: LP	182	—
Emotions	Released: 1968; Label: Philips; Formats: LP	194	—
Extensions	Released: 1969; Label: Philips; Formats: LP	155	—
Love Token	Released: 1969; Label: Philips; Formats: LP	165	—
Stormy Weekend	Released: 1970; Label: Philips; Formats: LP; Reissues: 1972, Warner Bros., 1975, Sound Bird	165	—
English Muffins	Released: 1971; Label: Philips; Formats: LP	174	—
Love the One You're With	Released: 1972; Label: Philips; Formats: LP; Reissues: 1974, Sound Bird	184	—
Country Lovin' Folk	Released: 1972; Label: Philips; Formats: LP	—	—
Highway One	Released: 1972; Label: Philips; Formats: LP	—	—
Moods for a Stormy Night	Released: 1972; Label: Philips; Formats: LP; Reissues: 1972, Bainbridge, 1975, Sound Bird	—	—
Awakening	Released: 1973; Label: Philips; Formats: LP	190	164
Clear Light	Released: 1973; Label: Warner Bros.; Formats: LP	—	—
Erogenous	Released: 1974; Label: Warner Bros.; Formats: LP; Reissues: 1975, Sound Bird	—	—
Being With You	Released: 1976; Label: Sound Bird Records; Formats: LP	—	—
Cosmic Force	Released: 1978; Label: Mobile Fidelity Sound Lab; Formats: LP	—	—
Nightglow	Released: 1978; Label: Soundbird Records; Formats:LP	—	—
Another Stormy Night	Released: 1983; Label: Bainbridge; Formats: LP	—	—
Summer Moods	Released: 1985; Label: Bainbridge; Formats: LP	—	—
Stormy Memories	Released: 1990; Label: Bainbridge; Formats: LP, CD	—	—
