= Denjin Zaborger =

- Genre: Tokusatsu
- Created by: Shōzō Uehara; Souji Ushio; Kazuo Koike (concept)
- Written by: Shōzo Uehara
- Starring: Takehisa Yamaguchi
- Theme music composer: Shunsuke Kikuchi
- Opening theme: "Tatakae! Denjin Zaborger!" by Masato Shimon
- Ending theme: "Ore No Kyoudai Denjin Zaborger" by Masato Shimon
- Composer: Shunsuke Kikuchi
- Country of origin: Japan
- Original language: Japanese
- No. of seasons: 1
- No. of episodes: 52

Production
- Producer: Tomio Sagisu
- Running time: 24 minutes
- Production companies: P Productions; Fuji Television

Original release
- Network: Fuji Television (FNS)
- Release: April 6, 1974 – June 29, 1975

Related
- Tetsujin Tiger Seven

Denjin Zaborger (電人ザボーガー, Denjin Zabōgā), translated as Electroid Zaborger, was a Japanese tokusatsu television series that aired in 1974. Produced by P Productions, it was the production company's seventh tokusatsu series, following Tetsujin Tiger Seven and preceding Bouken Rockbat.

The series stars, actor and stuntman, Takehisa Yamaguchi (best known as Joji Yuki/Riderman in Kamen Rider V3) as secret agent Yutaka Daimon.

A movie remake titled Karate-Robo Zaborgar was released in 2011.

== Story ==
Secret Police (秘密刑事, Himitsu Keiji) agent Yutaka Daimon (大門 豊, Daimon Yutaka) returns to Japan after learning his father was murdered by the evil Dr. Akunomiya (悪之宮博士, Akunomiya-hakase), leader of the criminal gang Sigma (Σ(シグマ)団, Shiguma-dan). From his father Yutaka inherited the robot warrior Denjin Zaborger (電人ザボーガー, Denjin Zabōgā), made out of the mysterious metal Daimonium (ダイモニウム, Daimoniumu) which responds to Yutaka's voice commands. Zaborger has the unique ability to transform into a motorcycle, Machine Zaborger (マシーン・ザボーガー, Mashīn Zabōgā), for Yutaka Daimon to ride.

Dr. Akunomiya's top aide in Sigma is a woman known as Miss Borg (ミスボーグ, Misu Bōgu). She is a cyborg with (in the early episodes anyway) the ability to transform into a masculine appearing robot warrior. Ruling Sigma with Dr. Akunomiya and Miss Borg are the seven Sigma Executives, leaders of Sigma's various worldwide operations. These nasty cyborgs eventually fall to Yutaka Daimon and Denjin Zaborger. Serving as Sigma's field agents are Sigma Mecha Animals, Sigma Cyborgs, Sigma Group Hitmen (human assassins), Sigma Mecha Borg, Sigma Borg and Sigma Soldiers. Dr. Akunomiya is a cruel and demanding master. He even turns against his most loyal servant Miss Borg, replacing her with a new female aide Lady Borg (レディ・ボーグ, Redi Bōgu). By then Sigma is on its last legs so Lady Borg does not last long.

After his cyborgs and robots (even Miss Borg) have failed to eliminate Yutaka Daimon, Dr. Akunomiya assigns the task of getting rid of his greatest enemy to a young assassin, the motorcycle riding Gen Akizuki (秋月 玄, Akizuki Gen). Gen Akizuki's bird shaped motorcycle is called Machine Hawk (マシーン・ホーク, Mashīn Hōku). Gen Akizuki's "Thunder Punch" and "Hurricane Punch" martial arts techniques proved to be a match for Yutaka Daimon's "Flying Dragon Tri-Stage Kick" and gave the hero some tough moments.

After finally defeating Gen Akizuki, in episode 38, Yutaka Daimon and Denjin Zaborger take out the last Sigma robot, in episode 39, and Yutaka Daimon at last comes face to face with his father's killer, Dr. Akunomiya. However, Yutaka is not the only one interested in the demise of Sigma. Another evil group hiding in the shadows hopes for the elimination of a rival. And so Yutaka Daimon and Zaborger's battle to restore peace in Japan has really just began.

In episode 40, Yutaka Daimon finds himself up against an even more dangerous group the Dinosaur Army (恐竜軍団, Kyōryū Gundan). To combat this group Yutaka Daimon is joined by a second, younger (and less skilled) Secret Police agent Ken Matsue (松江 健, Matsue Ken) who rides a bazooka-armed motorcycle called Machine Bach (マシーン・バッハ, Mashīn Bahha). Starting with episode 41 Machine Zaborger and Machine Bach merge to form Strong Zaborger (ストロング・ザボーガー, Sutorongu Zabōgā), a more powerful version of Denjin Zaborger.

The Dinosaur Army is led by an ancient monster, Triple Neck Demon (魔神三ツ首, Majin Mitsu Kubi). It is a three-headed dinosaur/dragon. One head of this ancient beast spits fire, one poison gas and one a bolt of energy. Triple Neck Demon's chief aides are the human worshipers Devil Hat (悪魔ハット, Akuma Hatto) and Princess Meza (王女メザ, Ōjo Meza). Devil Hat makes the dinosaur shaped robots for the Dinosaur Army and uses his hat like a weapon. Princess Meza is an expert at disguises and serves as a spy. Under these three are the Dinosaur Army Mecha, Dinosaur Army Hitmen (human assassins) and the reptile headed Dragon Face Soldiers.

== Music ==
Opening Theme

- "Tatakae! Denjin Zaborger!" (Fight! Electroid Zaborger!) music by Shunsuke Kikuchi, lyrics by Shozo Uehara, vocals by Masato Shimon

Ending Theme

- "Ore No Kyoudai Denjin Zaborger" (My Brother Electroid Zaborger) music by Shunsuke Kikuchi, lyrics by Shozo Uehara, vocals by Masato Shimon

== Cast ==
- Yutaka Daimon: Takehisa Yamaguchi
- Zaborger: Yoichiro Tajiri
- Chief Inspector Daigoro Nitta (episodes 1-29): Nagami Jun
- Miyo Nitta (episodes 1-39): Midori Hoshino
- Hiroshi Nitta: Masahiro Kamiya
- Detective Nakano: Eiichi Kikuchi
- Dr. Akunomiya (episodes 1-39): Ken Okabe
- Miss Borg (episodes 1-35): Ritsuko Fujiyama
- Gen Akizuki (episodes 22-30, 34-38) : Ken Kazato aka Yūsuke Kazato
- Lady Borg (episodes 37-39): Taeko Yoshida
- Devil Hat (episodes 40-52): Takanobu Toya
- Princess Meza (episodes 40-52): Mitsuko Tsutsumi
- Ken Matsue (episodes 40-52): Tatsuya Sakada
