= Kaiju ouji =

- Also known as: Monster Prince
- Genre: Tokusatsu; Kaiju
- Theme music composer: Gan'ichi Hanma
- Opening theme: Kaijû Ôji no Uta ("The Song of the Monster Prince")
- Ending theme: Kaijû Ondo ("Monster Marching Song")
- Country of origin: Japan
- Original language: Japanese
- No. of episodes: 26

Production
- Running time: 24 Min.
- Production company: P-Productions

Original release
- Network: Fuji Television Network
- Release: October 2, 1967 – March 25, 1968

Kaiju Ouji (怪獣王子, Kaijū Ōji) also known as "The Monster Prince" is a Japanese dinosaur-themed tokusatsu/kaiju television series, produced by P Productions and ran on the Fuji Television Network from October 2, 1967, to March 25, 1968, lasting a total of twenty-six episodes.

== Characters ==
=== Heroes ===
Takeru Ibuki: The main character. A young boy who befriends a brontosaurus.

Nessie: A young brontosaurus who is fighting the aliens who killed her parents with the help of the Japanese military and her human friend. She possesses great physical strength and, much like her father, the ability to fire a steam of flames.

=== Villains ===
Aliens (group 1): a group of bizarre gargoyle aliens who serve as the show's antagonists. They were killed and defeated in episode 14. They possess various unnamed guns and missile-shooters, as well as the strange power to resurrect fossilized creatures.

Aliens (group 2): a different, more powerful group of fly-like aliens that appeared in episodes 15–26. These aliens possess more advanced weapons, are able to fire an unidentified yellow paste-like acid from their snouts, and can alter their revived creatures' genetic material and turn them into giants.
