= List of Basilisk episodes =

Basilisk is an anime television series based on the manga series of the same title written and illustrated by Masaki Segawa. The series first premiered in Japan between April and September 2005. It has also been aired across numerous international regions. On July 19, 2017, it was announced that Yamada's sequel, Basilisk: The Ōka Ninja Scrolls was green-lit for an anime and premiered on January 8, 2018. The series uses five musical themes: two openings and three ending theme songs. For season one, the opening theme is Kouga Ninpou Chou by Onmyo-Za while the ending themes for the first fourteen episodes are "Hime Murasaki" by Nana Mizuki and "Wild Eyes" by Nana Mizuki. For season two, the opening theme is "Ōka Ninpōchō" by Onmyo-Za while the ending theme is "Hot Blood" by Nana Mizuki.

== Episodes ==
=== Basilisk (2005) ===
The story takes place in the year 1614. Two ninja clans, Tsubagakure of the Iga and Manjidani of Kouga, battle each other to determine which grandson of Tokugawa Ieyasu will become the next shogun. The deadly competition between 10 elite ninja from each clan unleashes a centuries-old hatred that threatens to destroy all hope for peace between them.

No.	Title	Original release date	English air date
1	"Destiny"; Transliteration: "Sōshi Sōsatsu" (Japanese: 相思相殺)	April 12, 2005	January 10, 2008
In 1614, after a demonstration duel between Kazamachi Shougen of the Kouga and Yashamaru of the Iga clans at Sunpu, the shogun Tokugawa Ieyasu, orders the truce between the two long-time feuding ninja clans to be canceled and commands each clan to send 10 of their best ninja to enter a competition to eliminate each other. The surviving team would garner favor from the shogun for a thousand years, and their grandson will be the undisputed heir to the Shogunate. A scroll is used to indicate the competitors from the table. In a flashback, the two current leaders, Iga Ogen and Kouga Danjou, are shown as former lovers in 1581 when the Kouga attacked the Iga in a surprise night-time attack, and Danjou helped Ogen and some Iga escape. Back in the present, they end up killing each other and mark their names off on the scroll, the first ninja to be eliminated.
2	"Last Rendezvous"; Transliteration: "Taidō Niba" (Japanese: 胎動弐場)	April 19, 2005	January 17, 2008
At the Toki Pass on the Kouga-Iga border, the betrothed lovers Kouga Gennosuke of the Kouga clan and Oboro of the Iga clan hope peace will finally reign between the clans. However Kouga Udono Jousuke intercepts Iga Ogen’s hawk carrying the scroll on which the contestants' names are written, and then encounters Iga Azuki Rousai. Rousai suggests a ninpou game for the scroll. Meanwhile, Kazamachi Shougen nears the Kouga Manjidani (compound), with the Kouga copy of the scroll, planning to eliminate the Iga on the list. The next morning as Gennosuke and Oboro return home, they meet the Iga Akeginu, Mino Nenki, Hotarubi and Amayo Jingorou. They are interrupted by Rousai and Jousuke and Oboro is handed the Iga copy of the scroll. Without reading it, Oboro accompanies Gennosuke and sends the scroll back to the Iga Tsubagakure where Yakushiji Tenzen is pleased to receive news of the cancellation of the longstanding truce.
3	"The Onslaught of War"; Transliteration: "Kyōchū Muzan" (Japanese: 凶蟲無惨)	April 26, 2005	January 24, 2008
When Yakushiji Tenzen receives the Iga copy of the scroll he decides to keep the contents secret from Oboro. He prepares to attack the Kouga, targeting Kazamachi Shougen first. Tenzen and the Iga ambush a Kouga palanquin and they find the limbless Jimushi Jubei inside. Tenzen sends the others to deal with Shougen, however Jubei catches Tenzen by surprise, stabbing him with a spear head which he held in his throat and wielded with his long tongue, leaving Tenzen for dead. Meanwhile, Hotarubi, Mino Neki, Yashamaru and Rousai ambush Shougen to get his copy of the scroll, but he retaliates and traps them with his sticky phlegm. Hotarubi summons her glowing pink butterflies enabling Mino Nenki to wound Shougen, however Shougen throws away the scroll which is caught by Jubei. Worried that Shougen may have wounded Yashamaru, Hotarubi stabs Shougen repeatedly in a frenzy. As Jubei flees along the ground with the scroll, he encounters what he thinks is a vision of Tenzen who survived, but this time he is prepared and he kills Jubei. With both scrolls in his possession, Tenzen burns the Kouga copy to keep the news of the war from reaching the Kouga. Meanwhile, Gennosuke, Oboro, Udono and Akeginu enter the Iga Tsubagakure together.
4	"The Horned Owl"; Transliteration: "Yōkaku Yakō" (Japanese: 妖郭夜行)	May 3, 2005	January 31, 2008
Gennosuke and Udono feast with the Iga clan contemplating the coming peace to be brought by their union. Both are unaware that the Shogun has annulled the truce between the clans, although Gennosuke detects a level of tension. That night Akeginu prepares to kill Jousuke, but he mistakes her intentions and naively thinks she is attracted to him. She proposes friendly ninpou battle, but before it goes too far, they are interrupted by Oboro who separates them. Sitting alone, Gennosuke detects that he is being observed by an Iga with malicious intent, while outside, Oboro finds Jingorou stalking Gennosuke in his semi-liquid form and punishes him. Later, Jousuke finds Jingorou and forces him to reveal the reason why he tried to kill Gennosuke, but Jingorou manages to creep inside Jousuke and kill him.
5	"The Surprise Attack"; Transliteration: "Ninja Rokugi" (Japanese: 忍者六儀)	May 10, 2005	February 7, 2008
At the Kouga Manjidani, Okoi and Kisaragi Saemon are concerned about the absent Gennosuke as they await the return of their colleagues from Sunpu while Muroga Hyouma, Kagerou and Kasumi Gyoubu also discuss the implications of Gennosuke's relationship with Oboro and send Okoi to the Iga Tsubagakure to investigate. Meanwhile Tenzen, Hotarubi, Nenki, Koshirou and Rousai prepare to take out the rest of the ten Kouga on the scroll at the Kouga Manjidani, but they are discovered and surrounded. Trapped, they decide to fight even though heavily outnumbered and kill many of the Kouga. However Hyouma intervenes and calls a halt to the fighting, and after exchanging words, the Iga withdraw. Concerned about Jousuke’s disappearance, Gennosuke asks to send a messenger to Kouga Manjidani to check on his wellbeing.
6	"Longing in the Rain"; Transliteration: "Kōrui Renbo" (Japanese: 降涙恋慕)	May 17, 2005	February 14, 2008
Returning to Iga Tubagakure the Iga group comes across Okoi. They feign friendliness, however Okoi is suspicious and takes off, chased by Nenki. Using his excessive body hair, and bo staff Nenki knocks out Okoi, but Tenzen decides to keep her as a hostage rather than kill her. Even more concerned about Gennosuke following the Iga raid, Hyouma suspects that the truce may be over, and sends Gyoubu and Saemon to follow the Iga. Meanwhile, as Yashamaru returns from Sunpu, he is concerned that the Kouga may already have acted on the annulment of the truce. He is interrupted by Kisaragi Saemon who pretends to be Tenzen, so Yashamaru tells him about the end of the truce and the scrolls with the ten names. Shocked, Saemon reveals his identity and Yashamaru attacks him, but he is caught and choked by Gyoubu who was hiding within a wall. Yashamaru’s death is witnessed by one of Hotarubi's butterflies. Tenzen and his group return to the Iga Tsubagakure with Okoi as their prisoner while Saemon takes the face of Yashamaru and prepares to infiltrate the Iga. Gennosuke and Oboro are still unaware of the events unfolding around them.
7	"The Bloodsucking Seductress"; Transliteration: "Hitohada Jigoku" (Japanese: 人肌地獄)	May 24, 2005	February 21, 2008
Rousai questions Okoi about the Kouga techniques in the salt store where she is being held. He makes the fatal mistake of touching her so that he becomes stuck and she drains his blood leaving a dried husk. Meanwhile Gyoubu and Saemon disguised as Yashamaru, enter the Iga Tsubagakure. Jingorou goes searching for Rousai and visits the salt store where Okoi is being held. Hotarubi sees Kisaragi thinking it is Yashamaru and embraces him, relieved at his return and when her snake bites him she sucks out the poison. Back with Okoi, she seduces Jingorou, but when he touches her, like Rousai, he becomes stuck and she begins to drain his blood. Tenzen finally tells a shocked Oboro about the annulment of the truce between the Iga and Kouga.
8	"Cage of Blood"; Transliteration: "Chikemuri Mujō" (Japanese: 血煙無情)	May 31, 2005	February 28, 2008
Tenzen shows Oboro the roster of the 10 names from each clan to fight to the death. In the salt store, as Okoi drains Jingorou's blood he manages to revert to his semi-liquid form and escape. Nenki also comes looking for Rousai, but when Okoi tries to drain his blood, his hairy body prevents contact with his skin and he pierces her body with his hair instead. Hotarubi and Saemon, disguised as Yashamaru, enter the salt store to find Nenki and the dying Okoi. With her last breath, Okoi tells her brother that she killed Rousai and of the scroll hidden nearby. Saemon retrieves the scroll, just as Oboro arrives and with her mystic eyes unconsciously exposes Saemon who begins to fight for his life. Gyoubu appears, creating a distraction allowing Saemon to escape, then he seizes the scroll and also escapes. Tenzen calls the Iga together, and confront Gennosuke who is now joined by Saemon and Gyoubu. The Kouga remnants stand together in the midst of the Iga storm.
9	"Farewell"; Transliteration: "Aizetsu Rinu" (Japanese: 哀絶霖雨)	June 7, 2005	March 6, 2008
Gennosuke possesses the secret scroll with the names of the dead crossed out and Iga's elaborate deception has come to an end. Oboro, horrified at the deception and death of Okoi, Tenzen holds the Iga back from attacking, as he does not know Gennosuke's abilities, however some men attack, only to be killed by their own swords as a result of Gennosuke's (瞳術 Dōjutsu) eye technique. Tenzen allows them to pass and Gennosuke begins to leave, ignoring Oboro. Tenzen sends Chikuma Koshirou to attack Gennosuke, but Oboro intervenes, neutralizing Koshirou's abilities and allowing Gennosuke to wound him with his Dōjutsu. The next day, with Koshirou now wounded and blind, and three Iga on the roster dead, Tenzen berates Oboro and demands that she kill Gennosuke, but she refuses and seals her eyes shut with a potion given to her by Ogen.
10	"Divine Mandate"; Transliteration: "Shinso Gojō" (Japanese: 神祖御諚)	June 14, 2005	March 13, 2008
At Sunpu Castle Lord Ieyasu and the nobles review the carnage from a safe distance. The deaths of Danjou, then Shougen, Jousuke, Jubei and Okoi of the Kouga and Ogen, then Rousai and Yashamaru of the Iga. Also that in Edo Takechiyo the slow-witted grandson represented by the Iga is backed by Ofuku, while the younger grandson Kunichiyo represented by the Kouga is backed by Lady Oeyo, who see each other as rivals. The Shogun reveals that he has sent in Nankoubou Tenkai to keep the peace. Finishing his report, Hattori Kyouhachirou leaves to monitor the final stages of the war himself.
11	"On Their Own"; Transliteration: "Sekireki Mukoku" (Japanese: 石礫無告)	June 21, 2005	March 20, 2008
Gennosuke and the Kouga plan their strategy. Gennosuke sends the scroll and a letter to the Iga Tsubagakure stating that he has no wish to fight and that he will travel with his ninja on the list to Sunpu to appeal to the retired shogun and Hattori to stop the war. However, if they are attacked by the Iga on the way, they will retaliate with full force. Tenzen immediately takes up the challenge and prepares to pursue the Kouga, sending Nenki and Hotarubi to scout their location. In Sekiyado, while waiting for a break in the rain, the Kouga are found by Nenki and Hotarubi whose snake spits the eye-sealing potion onto Gennosuke's eyes, blinding him. Nenki stays to fight and sends Hotarubi back to report to Tenzen, however Hyouma uses his Dōjutsu to force Nenki to kill himself. Saemon pursues Hotarubi, wounding her.
12	"Remembrance"; Transliteration: "Tsuisō Gentō" (Japanese: 追想幻燈)	June 28, 2005	March 27, 2008
The Iga also wait out the rain, wondering if Nenki and Hotarubi have found the Kouga while Oboro thinks back to happier times she spent with Gennosuke. Hotarubi manages to escape Saemon by using decoy butterflies, so Saemon returns to Sekiyado where he sees the body of Nenki, angry at being cheated out of his revenge for the death of his sister. Meanwhile, Koshirou curses his fate and blindness, almost killing Akeginu when she comes to comfort him. Along the trail, as she struggles to return, Hotarubi thinks of happier times spent with Yashamaru when they were younger. Arriving at a broken suspension bridge, Hotarubi turns to see Nenki who claims to have killed Gennosuke and the Kouga.
13	"A Swarm of Butterflies"; Transliteration: "Kochō Ranbu" (Japanese: 胡蝶乱舞)	July 5, 2005	April 3, 2008
As Nenki tells Hotarubi how he slew the Kouga but allowed Saemon to escape, she realizes that the bandage on his finger is the same as the one on Saemon who was bitten when he impersonated Yashamaru. She realizes that Nenki is really Saemon in disguise, but it's too late and he kills her. As her body falls into the valley, it releases a swarm of butterflies. At Kuwana Port, Tenzen and the other four remaining Iga board a boat to sail to Miya Port and get to Sunpu first, not realizing that they are being watched by Gyoubu. Tenzen arranges to be alone with Oboro in an attempt to convince her to fight with them.
14	"Fallen Flower"; Transliteration: "Sange Kaikyō" (Japanese: 散花海峡)	July 12, 2005	April 10, 2008
Words from the past haunt Gennosuke, that peace will come when the Kouga and Iga know each other, and he recalls the missed opportunity of peace with Oboro. Tenzen tries to convince Oboro to fight against Gennosuke when her eyes reopen in five days, but she refuses. He then proposes marriage, and when she refuses he proceeds to rape her. On deck, hearing what's going on, Koshirou is conflicted by his loyalty to both Tenzen and Oboro, but when he goes to stop Tenzen, he finds him unconscious. Unbeknownst to both Koshirou and Oboro, Gyoubu is on board the ship and he choked Tenzen. Akeginu and Jingorou rush in and realize that Gyoubu is on board. Jingorou slashes at the ship but cannot find Gyoubu who emerges from the deck and throws Jingorou into the sea where he dissolves away, leaving just his clothes. Akeginu dives into the water but cannot save him. As Gyoubu appreciates his success, he feels something is wrong.
15	"Reckoning"; Transliteration: "Hatō Gokumon" (Japanese: 波涛獄門)	July 19, 2005	April 17, 2008
On the trail, the Kouga approach Miya Port, meanwhile on-board the ship, Tenzen has survived Gyoubu's attack and prepares to fight back. They play a game of cat and mouse, taunting each other over events between the Kouga and Iga in the past. Gyoubu thinks back to the past, training with his father and learning the realities of battle and developing a hatred of the Iga. When Akeginu stains Gyoubu with blood, Tenzen is able to follow his movements through the ship and slays Gyoubu with his sword. Only four ninja now remain on each side. On the border bridge between Owari and Mikawa, the Kouga find the body of Gyoubu embedded within a wooden crate.
16	"First Impressions"; Transliteration: "Kaihō Tanga" (Japanese: 懐抱淡画)	July 26, 2005	April 24, 2008
In a flashback, the Kouga and Iga are shown pursuing their lives in the days of peace. The Second Hattori Hanzo wonders why Kouga Danjo and Iga Ogen chose young relatives, Gennosuke and Oboro, as their successors over other, more suitable candidates. Gennosuke and Oboro are shown when they met and played as children, then again later as young adults as Gennosuke dreams of eliminating the animosity between the two clans.
17	"Wandering Hearts"; Transliteration: "Konmei Rubō" (Japanese: 昏冥流亡)	August 2, 2005	May 1, 2008
The Kouga come across Ogen's hawk carrying a scroll, and Saemon and Kagerou manage to make the bird drop it. Meanwhile Gennosuke and Hyouma encounter Tenzen, and Gennosuke tries to convince him to put aside their differences until he can talk to the retired shogun. Tenzen refuses, and overconfident at facing the two apparently blind men, Tenzen attacks them, not realizing that Hyouma also possesses the Dōjutsu and he opens his eyes and forces Tenzen to kill himself. At Chiryu on the Tokaido Road, Akeginu washes Oboro as she tries to remove the experience of being violated by Tenzen. Meanwhile, Koshirou wanders in the night, left behind by Tenzen, and eventually catches up with the three Kouga; Gennosuke, Kagerou and Hyouma.
18	"A Dawn Without Light"; Transliteration: "Mumyō Futsugyō" (Japanese: 無明払暁)	August 9, 2005	May 8, 2008
In Edo, Lady Oeyo wants to take action after she discovers that someone tried to poison Kunichiyo but Tenkai advises restraint. Meanwhile, Koshirou uses both his whirlwind technique and kama hand scythes to attack the three Kouga. Hyouma tells Kagerou to take Gennosuke to safety while he tries to stop Koshirou. Because Koshirou has been blinded, Hyouma's Dōjutsu has no effect on him, and Koshirou manages to use his whirlwind technique to hit Hyouma. As Hyouma stands, mortally wounded, he thinks back to the time when he was asked by Danjou to teach Gennosuke the Dōjutsu technique and how he became Gennosuke's mentor.
19	"Conspiracy"; Transliteration: "Mōjo Kanbō" (Japanese: 猛女姦謀)	August 16, 2005	May 15, 2008
Koshirou hears the voice of Akeginu telling him that Oboro was killed by Saemon and asks him to kill her, however the voice is that of Saemon, and the woman he embraces is Kagerou who kills him using her poisonous breath. Later when Oboro and Akeginu find Koshirou dead, Akeginu is distraught and repeatedly stabs Hyouma's lifeless body in anger. As Ofuku travels secretly by palanquin to Ise, she encounters Akeginu and Oboro, the two remaining Iga, and reveals what the war has been about, the Tokugawa successor. This is overheard by Gennosuke, Saemon and Kagerou who are concealed nearby. Meanwhile Tenzen uses his regenerative powers to resurrect his body.
20	"River of Mercy"; Transliteration: "Jinji Ryūryū" (Japanese: 仁慈流々)	August 23, 2005	May 22, 2008
In a flashback, Tenzen is seen talking to the young Ogen after the attack by the Kouga. With the knowledge of the reason for the cancellation of the truce, Gennosuke realizes that it will not end until one side wins or loses. Saemon, disguised as Tenzen, enters the Kouga compound and tells Akeginu that Kagerou is on a bridge nearby and takes her with him on the pretext of killing Kagerou. Meanwhile the real Tenzen arrives at the compound. Akeginu viciously attacks Kagerou, but at the last minute, Saemon restrains her and she is killed by Kagerou. A short time later, Ofuku's retainers confront Saemon, disguised as Tenzen on the bridge.
21	"With All Her Heart"; Transliteration: "Misatsu Kagerō" (Japanese: 魅殺陽炎)	August 30, 2005	June 5, 2008
Saemon is confronted by Ofuku's retainers, who want to test his ability to return from the dead and he is suddenly stabbed by a spear. Saemon realizes that Tenzen must have died earlier and come back to life, and was in fact the disguised retainer before him. Before he can retaliate, Saemon is stabbed to death by the retainers. Meanwhile Kagerou lies to Gennosuke, saying that she killed Oboro, and then confesses that she wishes to stay by his side. Tenzen prepares a trap for Kagerou at Ofuku's base at the Hamamatsu Inns. Kagerou does not realize that Saemon is dead, and when she meets Tenzen she thinks he is Saemon in disguise. He says they must make love to convince the Kouga that she has switched sides, however she suspects that he is the real Tenzen as he is raping her. Kagerou then kills him with her poisonous kiss, and then snaps his neck, which brings the retainers running into the room to kill her. Ofuku orders Oboro to kill her, but Oboro says she is of more use as bait to lure Gennosuke.
22	"The Haunted"; Transliteration: "Kikoku Shūshū" (Japanese: 鬼哭啾々)	September 6, 2005	June 12, 2008
While Ofuku's group is stopped at the Kakegawa Inns on the Tokaido Road and Kagerou manages to escape. Just as she is about to kill Oboro, the resurrected Tenzen recaptures her. Oboro then issues a public challenge, seeking to draw Gennosuke out of hiding and retrieve the scroll. That night, Tenzen tortures Kagerou, with her screams piercing the night. When Oboro tries to stop Tenzen he decides to rape her again, in front of Kagerou, but he is interrupted by the arrival of Gennosuke. Drawing their swords, Tenzen attacks the blind Gennosuke wounding him a number of times. As he senses victory within his grasp, Tenzen admits that it was he who initially caused the Kouga to attack the Iga to perpetuate the rivalry between the two clans.
23	"Emancipation"; Transliteration: "Mugen Hōyō" (Japanese: 夢幻泡影)	September 13, 2005	June 19, 2008
Tenzen taunts Gennosuke as he stands wounded and bleeding, then stabs him, but Gennosuke takes the opportunity to behead Tenzen. Gennosuke then tells Oboro that they must kill each other to end the war, but she pleads with him to kill her as does Kagerou. As Gennosuke turns to leave with Kagerou, she tries to kiss him, but Oboro finally opens her eyes and neutralizes her poisonous kiss. Oboro then hides Gennosuke from Ofuku's retainers who are ordered to replace Tenzen's head. His head only partially reattaches long enough to reveal Gennosuke's location before Oboro uses her powers to stop the regeneration process and finally kill him. Oboro also refuses to have Gennosuke slain, so Ofuku sends a message to Hattori Hanzo that a final duel must take place.
24	"Requiem"; Transliteration: "Raise Kaikō" (Japanese: 来世邂逅)	September 20, 2005	June 26, 2008
At Hattori Hanzo's residence, ten days after the start of the war, Gennosuke, who is barely able to stand, and Oboro face the final duel. They have little care as to which one wins as they each reflect on their time together. Although he is tasked with monitoring the succession dispute, Hattori Kyouhachirou apologizes to Oboro for the slaughter it has caused and Oboro asks that he keep Gennosuke's flute. Ofuku tries to distance herself from any involvement, but is still held in suspicion. Gennosuke and Oboro face each other and after telling Gennosuke she loves him, Oboro turns her sword on herself and dies. Gennosuke then takes the scroll and grants the victory to Oboro and the Iga before carrying her body into the river and ending his own life.

=== Basilisk: The Ouka Ninja Scrolls (2018) ===
It is 1626 in the Kan'ei era, ten years after the fight for succession of the shogun, which pitted the Kouga and Iga ninja clans against each other.

No. overall	No. in season	Title	Original release date
25	1	"The Cherry Blossoms Have Fallen"; Transliteration: "Ōka, Sakinikeri" (Japanese: 桜花、咲きにけり)	January 9, 2018
At Suruga Castle, Iemitsu's brother and rival, Tadanaga leaves for Edo to visit his dying mother. Meanwhile at remote Jison'in Village on Takano Mountain in the land of Kii, young Iga and Kouga ninja children, Rui, Shikibu Kora, Hachirou, Hachisu, Utsutsu, Saizou Ishi and Namenba play a deadly game of ninpou. When Utsutsu interferes in master Kazuma Kusanagi's practice, he strings her up in a tree, but Hachirou releases her. Gei'in and the other masters, Tenshin and Kasou arrive and Gei'in berates Kazuma for his single mindedness in training saying that they must protect the bloodlines of Kouga and Iga ninja clans carried by Hachirou Kouga and Hibiki Iga. On the way to Edo, Tadanaga and his men are stopped by the raging Ooi River at Tootoumi. While trying to find a way to cross they are confronted by mysterious man who easily slaughters the lord's men when challenged. Tadanaga tries to kill him without success as he is a ninja with the ability to dodge swords using the Ukigumo Floating Cloud technique. The stranger confirms that the lord is the Dainagon of Suruga, however before he can kill the lord, five Kouga clan ninjas arrive to protect him.
26	2	"The Five Treasures Have Arrived"; Transliteration: "Gohōren, Suisan su" (Japanese: 五宝連、推参す)	January 16, 2018
At the succession ceremony of the new shogun, Takechiyo and Kunichiyo are shown the ninja scroll saying Iga Oboro was the last to die, confirming Takechiyo as the future shogun, much to Kunichiyo's disappointment. Back at the Ooi River the five Kouga ninjas identify the assailants as Iga ninja. Kaso Himonji uses his Grass Fire technique to attack the Iga and Kazuma Kusanagi uses his Heaven's Lyre whips to slash them, but an Iga uses his Darkness Spider to cloak the area in darkness. However Shichito Gei'in uses his Firefly Squid technique to illuminate the night and calls on Tenshin who uses his Thousand-Handed Kannon to finish them off. While waiting to proceed, Tadanaga questions Gei'in about Gennosuke's eye technique. In Jison'in Village, Hachirou plans to leave, concerned that his and Hibiki's powers are a threat to them both. Meanwhile Tadanaga speculates with Gei'in and Kaso Himonji about what actually happened on the day of the duel between Gennosuke and Oboro and Kyouhachirou's interest in continuing the Kouga and Iga blood lines. Suddenly Tenshin appears at the door, but he falls dead before them.
27	3	"The Kouga Must Die"; Transliteration: "Kōga, Chirubeshi" (Japanese: 甲賀、散るべし)	January 23, 2018
In the early days of training, the young ninja practice, but are reminded by Gorone Negoro that they do not fight for Kouga nor Iga, but for their leaders. They also learn about the powers of Hibiki and Hachirou. Back at the Ooi River Gei'in and Kaso rush out looking for Kazuma and find him bound to a water wheel and killed by his own Heaven's Lyre. The meet the killer, but when Kaso attacks him, his own Grass Fire flames consume him. He reveals his name is Kujaku Tsuibamu, one of the Joujinshuu, enemies of both the Five Treasures of Kouga and Five Flowers of Iga who are fated to die that night. As he talks Gei'in sends his poisonous Firefly Squid below Kujaku Tsuibamu, but he avoids it, and even when he sends a burst of poison towards him, it returns to his body, killing him. Hachirou detects that four Treasures of Kouga are dead and returns with Hibiki to the village. Gorone reminds them that they must put their clan differences aside, and sends Rui and Shichigen to warn the Five Flowers of Iga while the others stand guard. Back at the Ooi River Tadanaga is confronted by Joujin, a former palace official who tells him that he will be executed by his brother, Shogun Iemitsu.
28	4	"The Joujinshuu Appear"; Transliteration: "Iga no Kuni, Iga no Sato Chikaku" (Japanese: 伊賀の国、伊賀の里近く)	January 30, 2018
That night Iga ninja Tsuta Houetsu encounters a Joujinshuu woman who threatens to kill him, but he trusts his defensive root barrier. She reveals her name is Yasha Itaru as he uses his Root Lasoo technique to bind her, however he makes the mistake of looking into her mirror, Destiny's Passage, which reflects his life, filling him with despair forcing to leap off a cliff to his death. Back at the Ooi River Joujin calls his attendants, Kujaku Tsuibamu and Rinne Magoroku who uses a spinning technique to transport Tadanaga to Akayashagaruba before the Kokuuzou Bosatsu or Adamantite Tower. Meanwhile, the Iga ninja search for Houestsu and encounter the Joujinshuu, Neiri Chiou. Tadanaga finds himself going back in time through Kujaku Tsuibamu's Inverted Halberd of Time, to when his brother was sick with the pox and envied his sibling's good health. Tadanaga now realizes that the Kurokuwa, were sent by his brother to kill him, and his only option is rebellion. Back at Jison'in Village, an eagle delivers a cloth with the word Joujinshuu written in blood from Gei'in, the name of his killers. As Rui and Shichigen near the Iga village, they find the remains of what appears to be the Five Flowers of Iga. At Ooi River, Tadanaga is confronted by the four severed heads of the Iga; Shogyo Kareha, Tsuta Houestsu, Irootoroe Itsuma and Suiren Shuugetsu. Joujin says he left only Kouga Hachirou and Iga Hibiki alive to demonstrate the power within his control.
29	5	"The Cherry Blossoms Run Mad"; Transliteration: "Ōka, Kyōhon-su" (Japanese: 桜花、狂奔す)	February 6, 2018
Outside Jison'in village, the ninja students are confronted by a physical illusion of a huge, dark, powerful beast riding an elephant. For safety, Gorone leads Hachiro and Hibiki to a secret tunnel in the mountain to hide while the situation is resolved. Utsutsu and Shaizou try to defeat the monster's controller, Neiri Chiou, but his illusions are too powerful. Meanwhile Hachisu and Shikibu tackle the monster itself and manage to trick it into falling off a cliff, but their victory is short-lived. Rui and Shichigen also try to attack Neiri Chiou and the monster but fail. Meanwhile Hachiro exits the tunnel, leaving Hibiki behind. He counteracts Neiri Chiou's technique with his Dojutsu, and so Joujin recalls him. Hachiro finds Joujin is unaffected by his Dojutsu technique because of his self control conditioning. Joujin then calls on Yasha Iratu to use her Destiny's Passage mirror to kill Hachiro and Hibiki who had just emerged from the tunnel. However Namenba suddenly intercedes, chasing off Yasha Iratu, but not before Hachiro and Hibiki look into each other's eyes creating a powerful maelstrom of light. Epilogue: Tadanaga finally arrives back at the palace and six months later Lady Oeyo, the former shogun's, wife passes away.
30	6	"Evil Clouds Begin to Stir"; Transliteration: "Kyōun, Taidō-su" (Japanese: 凶雲、胎動す)	February 13, 2018
In 1630, four years later, in Edo Castle Tokugawa Hidetada strips Tadanaga of his lands and privilege for killing monkeys at Sengen Shrine at Suruga. Later that year, Hidetada passes away from illness, and his funeral is held in secret according to his wishes. A year later, Tadanaga is exiled at Takasaki Castle in the distant land of Joushuu (Kōzuke Province). Several years later, the young ninjas have grown while continuing their training in preparation for the day their enemies reappear. They have not seen Hachiro since the battle with Joujin and his agents, although since he left, Hibiki has been conscious of his presence. Meanwhile Hachiro has also honed his skills, in preparation for facing Joujin again. One day, while crossing a suspension bridge, Hachiro encounters a blindfolded stranger who attacks him to test his skills. The stranger introduces himself as Hadaebou, and delivers a message that the Dainagon of Suruga who is exiled in Kouzuke wants to speak with him. He believes a strange, dark moving castle called Murakumo is coming.
31	7	"Tadanaga's Change of Heart"; Transliteration: "Tadanaga, honshin su" (Japanese: 忠長、翻心す)	February 20, 2018
Namenba infiltrates Edo Castle to speak to the shogun. She is intercepted by the Iga Kurokuwa, but although she kills them all, she suspects someone helped her. She dribbles a truth potion in the sleeping shogun's mouth and questions him. She finds that he knows nothing about Joujin who appears to be acting without the shogun's authority. As she escapes, she encounters Hadaebou who was her mysterious ally. At Jison'in village the ninja girls discuss the dark moving castle or houren (鳳輦, imperial carriage) which Hibiki believes is transporting the Joujinshuu. In Takasaki Castle, Tadanaga tells Hachiro about his encounter with Joujin 6 years ago and the power he displayed. Tadanaga says Joujin tricked him into killing the monkeys at Sengen Shrine and then built the Murakumo with money he gave to Joujin to build an imperial carriage in his mother's memory. He asks Hachiro to destroy the Murakumo and the Joujinshuu inside, however Hachiro refuses, not wanting the ninjas again to be pawns in a Tokugawa power struggle. Angry, Tadanaga calls on his samurai waiting outside to kill Hachiro. They enter wearing eye-shades, but Shaizou allows Hachiro to focus his Dojutsu technique through his moving eyes, forcing them to kill each other. Hachiro then leaves, but Tadanaga orders him to be followed and killed.
32	8	"The Advent of Joujin"; Transliteration: "Jōjin, sairai su" (Japanese: 成尋、再来す)	February 27, 2018
In a flashback to 18 years earlier in Edo Castle, Tenkai is seen proposing a ninja duel to the shogun to settle his succession and save a costly war between opposing samurai. In the present, Tadanaga's commander Bunnoshin, prepares to trap Hachiro, firstly by a group of archers commanded by a man with sensitive hearing who can direct their arrows to avoid Hachiro's Dojutsu technique. However a flight of crickets sent by Shichigen distracts him, enabling Hachiro to use his Dojutsu to destroy them all. The next trap uses riflemen commanded by the master marksman Gorouza the Hawk, but Shikibu first ambushes the riflemen, with Hachiro then killing the remainder. Gorouza prepares to shoot Hachiro, but soap bubbles he blew to show wind direction enable Hachiro again to use his Dojutsu and Gorouza shoots himself. Hachiro then refuses his comrades' help, wanting to seek revenge without spilling their blood. When Hachiro stops for food, he meets Gobo, High Priest Tenkai's ninja monk, who offers an alliance against the common enemy, Joujin, who now has additional forces called the Rain. Meanwhile Utsutsu and Rui investigate the Murakumo. They encounter what appear to be farmers, but they are Joujin's Rain fighters. Pursued by the Rain, the two ninja fight back with their special skills. At Suruga, Joujin confronts Tadanaga.
33	9	"The Butterfly Dances"; Transliteration: "Kochō, Maeri" (Japanese: 胡蝶、舞えり)	March 6, 2018
Joujin tells Tadanaga that he could become a god like the samurai Oda Kazusanosuke Nobunaga. Utsutsu and Rui continue the fight the pursuing Rain fighters but are outnumbered however, their ninja comrades and Namemba appear and assist them. Back at the village, Gorone examines Utsutsu's sketch of the Murakumo while Namemba tells him about her conversation with the monk, Nankoubou Tenkai, most trusted councilor of Lord Ieyasu who asked for the ninja's help defeating the common enemy, the Joujinshuu. The ninja regroup at their cafe and learn about Hachiro’s meeting with Tadanaga and his intention to fight alone. They decide to learn more about the Murakumo, Shaizou using his technique to see inside the structure, with his vulnerable body protected by the others. He sees the what appears to be the Kazusanosuke (Vice Governor) who crumbles to dust before he has to withdraw. They are again pursued by the Rain, leaving it to Rui to dispose of them with backup from Hachisu. Meanwhile, Hachiro sees the soldiers of Kishuu on the march.
34	10	"The Heavenly Robe Sees Carnage"; Transliteration: "Hagoromo, shura o mitari" (Japanese: 羽衣、修羅を見たり)	March 13, 2018
Seventeen years ago, in the 20th year of the Keichou Era, at Osaka, during the summer Campaign, handmaid Otashi reveals to Senhime that she is in fact Namemba, an Iga ninja. In the present at Edo Castle, Tenkai is trying to find Tadanaga and calls in Hadaebou. Hadaebou travels to Jison'in village and asks for the ninja's assistance to defeat Joujin and the Murakumo, but they are reluctant to become involved. Meanwhile the Kishuu prepare to attack the Murakumo with canons, but Joujin reassures Tadanaga that they are well-defended. He opens fire with his own canons, completely wiping out the Kishuu forces. Back in the Keichou Era, Senhime is revealed as Hideyori's wife and granddaughter of Tokugawa Ieyasu. Nambemba escapes with her, leaving her to be found by Sakazaki Naomori and rescued. In the present, Gorone has decided to destroy the Murakumo assisted by information provided by Hadaebou about the Joujinshuu, and outlines his plan to the ninjas. At Edo Castle, Tenkai receives news that the ninja will attack the Murakumo, and decides that Tadanaga must suffer the consequences of his alliance with Joujin.
35	11	"Like a Rhinoceros"; Transliteration: "Nanji, sai no tsuno no gotoku" (Japanese: 汝、犀の角のごとく)	March 20, 2018
While Shikibu Kora is being fitted for new armor, Gorone explains that he must move like a Rhinoceros, wandering in a single direction. Suddenly, the ninjas detect that they have intruders, and Hachisu goes to intercept them. She shoots two of them, but the third, a huge one-eyed man wrapped in torn bandages is not affected by her bullets and manages to corner her. Shikibu arrives and grabs him, but he has same strength abilities as Shikibu and he forces Shikibu and Hachisu to fall into a rocky crevasse. In a flashback, Shikibu is shown as a young boy, wrapped in bandages when he is told by a priest of his fate, to wander alone and have no friends. While Hibiki leaves the village, carrying a new set of armor for Shikibu, Shikibu suffers in pain from his own unprotected body as it bursts off pieces of his remaining armor. Hachisu removes her clothes and wraps him to relieve the pain, reminding him that his job is to protect their leaders. Hibiki encounters the bandaged intruder, but he covers his eyes to protect himself from her ability. However, Hachiro appears and catches the intruder unaware, piercing him with his sword before he again disappears. Hachisu and Shikibu then emerge to find the wounded intruder, but this time Shikibu uses all his strength to kill him.
36	12	"The Wind Blows Through the Pines"; Transliteration: "Shōrai, fukinukeri" (Japanese: 松籟、吹き抜けり)	March 27, 2018
The four ninja, Rui, Shichigen, Shaizou and Utsutsu, leave to implement Gorone's plan to destroy the Murakumo. A short while later, Hachisu and Shikibu return to the village. The four ninja approach the Murakumo by boat and Rui and Shichigen prepare to engage the defending Rain fighters. In a flashback, the young Shichigen recalls how he began to control insects. Outside the Murakumo, Rui distracts a group of the Rain while Shichigen cuts them down. However, it's a trap and they come under heavy rifle fire from the Rain and Shichigen is shot in the thigh. Meanwhile, Hibiki, Hachisu and the re-armored Shikibu leave the village to follow them. Surrounded by the Rain, Rui and Shichigen encounter Hachiro. With the aid of Shichigen's control of insects, Hachiro defeats the Rain with his Dojutsu technique, except for one who is dispatched by Rui. In a final series of flashbacks, Shichigen recalls how his mother was killed by a wandering samurai because of his inexperience and that he later named his technique "Wind Through the Pines".
37	13	"Utsutsu Dreams of Hell"; Transliteration: "Utsutsu, naraku no yume o miru" (Japanese: 現、奈落の夢を見る)	April 3, 2018
Rui and Shichigen part ways with Hachiro and then fire a flare to call the others for assistance. As Shaizou and Utsutsu go to their aid, they are also surrounded by the Rain. Utsutsu uses her Dreaming Reality technique, but one of the Rain throws a smoke bomb, neutralizing the effect of her illusions. Shaizou then uses his eyes to spread her illusions, consuming the Rain with fear, but also effecting himself. In a flashback, the young Utsutsu spends half of her time in a room dominated by a huge painted mandala depicting hell, which her father explains is to develop her ninja Dreaming Reality technique. On the day she must master the technique or die, her father burns himself to death before her, leaving her with a horrifying memory forever. Back in the present, Hachiro encounters Hadaebou attempting to infiltrate the Murakumo during the chaos. Shaizou fires a cannon balls at the Murakumo with little effect, and the second one is fired back at them by Kujaku Tsuibamu using his Inverted Halberd of Time. Meanwhile Hachiro permits Hadaebou to pass to rescue Tadanaga, however Joujin appears and reminds Hadaebou that Tenkai's orders were to eliminate Tadanaga if he could not be saved.
38	14	"Murakamo Must Be Destroyed"; Transliteration: "Murakumo, messubeshi" (Japanese: 叢雲、滅すべし)	April 10, 2018
Hachiro attacks Joujin, and Hadaebou takes the opportunity to continue his mission. Joujin easily defeats Hachiro, but then surprisingly sheathes his sword. The group of ninja regroup and Shaizou tries to analyse Kujaku's Inverted Halberd of Time technique by firing test cannon balls at the Murakumo. Hadaebou gains entry to the Murakumo but realizes that Tadanaga no intention of returning and has fully allied himself with Joijin. Meanwhile Joijin tries to convince Hachiro to join him, but Hachiro refuses and then escapes when Hibiki and Shikibu create a diversion. Joijin calls Kujaku to fire his Shiroku cannons at the ninjas which causes a massive earth displacement. Hachiro grabs Hibiki, and as their eyes meet, they again create a powerful maelstrom of light, the Ouka. They create the Ouka again to defeat Joujin, but Rinne Magoroku arrives to transport Joujin back to the Murakumo while Hachiro and Hibiki collapse into unconsciousness. Shaizou finally realizes that Kujaku's technique has a time limit and during that period, Namemba flies over the Murakumo on a kite and successfully fires a cannonball into the tower, causing a series of explosions which consume the Murakumo in flames.
39	15	"The Shielding Eye is Deceived"; Transliteration: "Jungan, hakararetari" (Japanese: 盾眼、謀られたり)	April 17, 2018
In Edo, Tenkai receives credit for the destruction of the Murakumo, with no mention of the ninjas. Although the Murakumo exploded, Gorone is suspicious about its fate as no debris were left behind. The ninjas return to operating their café but maintain a lookout for the Joujinshuu. While walking Shichigen sees visions of himself and his parents in the past, but it’s the combined work of the Joujinshuu. In Kyoto, Hachiro searches for the old Kamagawa village, and is told that the ghost of Nobunaga has been seen there. Meanwhile Hibiki has a vision created by Joujin that Hachiro professes his love for her. She leaves under the influence of Neiri Chiou, immobilizing the Iga who follow her. Meanwhile Hachiro meets Kujaku who challenges him. In their first encounter, Kujaku avoids Hachiro's Ouka, but the second time, Hachiro successfully counters Kujaku's Inverted Halberd of Time, cutting Kujaku's face with the very cherry tree branch he used as a weapon. Meanwhile back near the Iga village, a new Murakumo appears.
40	16	"The Massive Castle Rumbles"; Transliteration: "Kyojō, Meidō Su" (Japanese: 巨城、鳴動す)	April 24, 2018
Namemba and Hachisu see Hibiki being taken into the new Murakumo by the Joujinshuu. Hachisu attacks the Rain lookouts to get closer, she is surprised to be assisted by Hadaebou. Back in the village, Hachisu, Rui, Utsutsu and Namemba plan to rescue Hibiki. In a quiet moment during the preparations, Gorone and Namemba recall their first meeting. Later, Namemba and Hachisu plant explosives in the Murakumo's path to stop it, but they are ineffective. Again they meet Hadaebou, and this time Namemba and Hachisu reluctantly agree to work with him. Elsewhere, Hachiro encounters Itaru who manages to trap him within her Destiny's Passage mirror. Meanwhile Hadaebou and the three female Iga ninjas scale the walls of the Murakumo. Inside, Hibiki awakens and sees someone from her past.
41	17	"Everyone Gathers at the Battlefield"; Transliteration: "Ichidō, Shura ni Tsudou" (Japanese: 一同、修羅に集う)	May 1, 2018
Hibiki realizes that the woman she sees is her mother Oboro who blames Kouga Gennosuke for her fate. In a break from fighting the Rain, Rui surprisingly tells Utsutsu that she loves her. While Hadaebou scales the Murakumo, Hachiro is confronted by Itaru's Destiny's Passage and Rinne Magoroku's Adamantite Tower, but he uses his Dojutsu and they withdraw. Meanwhile Namemba recalls her youth and time with Rui, and their escape when their village was attacked. Hadaebou finally reaches Tadanaga, and tries to convince him to return to Edo.
42	18	"The Cherry Blossoms Must Fall"; Transliteration: "Ōka, Chirubeshi" (Japanese: 桜花、散るべし)	May 8, 2018
Neiri Chiou creates a demon god illusion to knock Namemba and Hachisu from the wall of the Murakumo where they meet Hachiro and Shichigen. Meanwhile, Hadaebou tries to convince Tadanaga to leave Joujin, however Joujin intercedes and tells him that he will be merely be the vessel to revive Oda Kazusanosuke Nobunaga. Joujin uses his powers to force Tadanaga to stab Hadaebou and then offers Tadanaga the opportunity to commit seppuku. Instead, Tadanaga rants at Joujin, cursing him forever and is decapitated instead. Still alive, Hadaebou grabs Tadanaga's head and escapes. By keeping his eyes closed, Neiri Chiou avoids Hachiro's Dojutsu, but Shichigen calls in swarm of insects, attracting a flock of birds which surround and distract Neiri Chiou. Suddenly Gorone appears driving a mechanized vehicle and distributes cannons to the ninjas. He then fires long barbed projectiles at Neiri Chiou, successfully severing his right arm, however Gorone is killed in the attempt. Over the body of Gorone, Hachiro asks the Iga ninjas to risk their lives to help him rescue Hibiki.
43	19	"100 Eyes See Their Destiny"; Transliteration: "Hyakume, Shukumei o Mitari" (Japanese: 百目、宿命を見たり)	May 15, 2018
The ninja hold a funeral for Gorone, then Hachiro enters Murakumo while the others prepare to rescue Hibiki. Shaizou sends out his eyes for observation, but accidentally sees Yasha Itaru's Destiny's Passage mirror and is taken back to when he was a boy and helped his father cheat at cards. Inside the Murakumo, Joujin outlines his proposal for peace to Hachiro, admitting that there will be casualties among both the innocent and the guilty with the arrival of the Demon King Lord Nobunaga. Shaizou's reflection continues, including when he was beaten by his father for failing in his duty which causes him to stand before the Murakumo as it advances over him. Joujin tries to convince Hachiro to participate in his plan for he and Hibiki to consummate their love and sacrifice their lives. Hachiro refuses, but is then confronted by Hibiki with a murderous intent.
44	20	"We Must See the Lotus Flowers Together"; Transliteration: "Renge, Tomo ni Mirubeshi" (Japanese: 蓮華、俱に見るべし)	May 22, 2018
Shikibu and Hachisu attack the Murakumo in a frontal assault, while inside, Hachiro fights off Hibiki who is being controlled by Joujin. Hachiro defenselessly lets Hibiki attack him and stops her, but, convinced by Joijin that she is Oboro, she calls him Gennosuke. Then, Rinne Magoroku tries to use his Adamantite Tower to control Hachiro. Meanwhile Shichigen, Rui and Utsutsu travel up through the Murakumo. Shichigen encounters Yasha Itaru who uses her Destiny's Passage mirror to creates the illusion that she is his mother. Controlled by Itaru, Shichigen then attacks and cuts Shikibu and Hachisu with his sword before they can defend themselves. Itaru then forces Shikibu to remove his constraining armor. However even without her hands, Hachisu shoots Itaru, breaking her spell and then Shikibu kills her as his unarmored body explodes. Meanwhile, Joujin thinks he now has control over Hachiro and Hibiki, and waits for them to consummate their relationship.
45	21	"Remembrance Must Fade"; Transliteration: "Omokage, Userubeshi" (Japanese: 於母影、失せるべし)	May 29, 2018
Rui and Utsutsu find Neiri Chiou, and Rei manages to stab him. However, after they leave, his body heals itself and they encounter him again, with his demon god displaying the wounds Neiri Chiou sustained himself. They then meet Shichigen who is being controlled by Itaru. Meanwhile, Namemba returns to the Murakumo with explosives and meets Hadaebou who offers to help her. Inside, Shichigen, under the control of Itaru, attacks Rui and Utsutsu, but Rui manages to reach through to him and he stabs himself with his katana, which simultaneously does the same to Neiri Chiou. Utsutsu then severs the head of the old Joujinshuu. At the top of the Murakumo, Hachiro is working to break Joujin's control over Hibiki, when Hadaebou bursts in, attacking Rinne Magoroku. Then, as Rui and Utsutsu race to the top of the Murakumo, Neiri Chiou makes one last attempt to kill the two girls as his demon god finally succumbs to the wounds Neiri Chiou received and he appears to fall to his death.
46	22	"The Demon Revives"; Transliteration: "Ma, Yomigaeritari" (Japanese: 魔、黄泉返りたり)	June 5, 2018
Joujin prepares to kill both Hachiro and Hibiki, while Rui and Utsutsu lie dying on the giant stairway. Hadaebou attacks Kujaku while Hachiro attacks Joujin. Suddenly illusions created by Rui and Utsutsu confuse Joukin, opening him to Hibiki's attack. Wounded, Joujin advances on Hibiki, only to be stabbed from behind by Kujaku. Kukaku recalls in 1582 when he was called Ranmaru, as his master Nobunaga's compound went up in flames, Nobunaga gave him the name Kujaku and bid him live on to keep his dream of conquest alive. Kujaku still serves his original master, and as Joujin's blood falls on the skull of Nobunaga, Kujaku places it on the body of Tadanaga and Nobunaga is resurrected. The dying Joujin is pleased that his plan came to fruition, however Nobunaga dismisses him and does not recognize Kujaku. Just then, Namemba arrives and triggers a series of explosions to destroy the Murakumo, but Kujaku's Inverted Halberd of Time reverses the explosions. This time, Rinne Magoroku cuts the fuses to prevent the explosions reoccurring, but suddenly Nobunaga stabs Kujaku with his katana, declaring that he is not as beautiful as his former Ranmaru.
47	23	"The Cherry Blossoms Scatter"; Transliteration: "Ōka, Midareau" (Japanese: 桜花、乱れあう)	June 12, 2018
Nobunaga attacks Hachiro, and during the swordfight Hachiro uses his Ouka. Nobunaga stabs himself, but there is no blood and he does not die. Namemba jumps to their aid, enveloping Nobunaga in cloth and setting off an explosion, but at the cost of her own life. As the smoke clears, Nobunaga appears to be still alive, but Tadanaga's consciousnesses fights him for control of the body and he severs his own head to finally thwart Nobunaga's plans. As Hachiro and Hibiki flee, Kujaku uses his last bit of energy to smash his Inverted Halberd of Time, but Rinne Magoroku uses his Adamantite Tower to counteract the effect, causing the three of them to be caught in a timeless space. Rinne still wants revenge and attacks Hachiro with his twin blades, but Hachiro manages to defeat him. Hachiro and Hibiki try to find a way out. They follow an apparition of Shaizou and leap into an apparent abyss. They then see a vision of the Murakumo setting fire to Edo, and the Joujin with his Joujinshuu watching it burn, but they do not recognize the two ninja. Hachiro and Hibiki are left wondering where they really are.
48	24	"The Cherry Blossoms Bloom"; Transliteration: "Ōka, Sakimodoritari" (Japanese: 桜花、咲き戻りたり)	June 19, 2018
In the alternate world, Hachiro and Hibiki easily defeat the Joujinshuu because they already know their techniques, leaving only Joujin standing. They use their Ouka to defeat Joujin, and Hachiro kills him. Hachiro plans to leave Hibiki, but she cuts her eyes, so he will stay with her. However, Joujin is not dead, surviving because of the power of Tenzen within him. Joujin cuts Hachiro, but Hachiro manages to use his Ouka to awaken Tenzen's hatred for Hachiro to force Joujin to kill himself before Hachiro dies. Some time later, the blind Hibiki is present at the early days of training of the young Iga ninja. Joujin re-appears, resurrected again by Tenzen, and he proposes to rape Hibiki so that their bloodlines will merge and continue. However the spirit of Hachiro within Hibiki emerges and cuts Joujin to pieces, finally killing both Joujin and Tenzen.
