= P Productions =

Japanese television company

- Type: Kabushiki gaisha
- Industry: Television
- Genre: Anime/Tokusatsu
- Founded: 1960
- Founder: Tomio Sagisu
- Headquarters: Ogikubo, Suginami, Tokyo, Japan
- Owner: Shirō Sagisu
- Website: p-production.jp

P Productions (ピー・プロダクション, Pī Purodakushon) is a Japanese production company, which has produced anime and tokusatsu television programs, with minor work in motion pictures. It was founded in 1960 by the late TV producer Tomio Sagisu (also known as Soji Ushio). The company exists today as a stockholder.

== Overview ==
Perhaps their most famous creations are Osamu Tezuka's Ambassador Magma, one of the first tokusatsu series dubbed into English and aired in the United States, and the three series that make up the unique Lion-Maru franchise, featuring anthropomorphic lion samurai battling evil in feudal Japan. Most of P Productions' film and television projects, like Ambassador Magma for example, features animation sequences created with matte paintings by Yoshio Watanabe with Tomio Sagisu himself, and termed in Japanese as "composited drawings" (合成作画, Gōsei Sakuga) or "drawing synthesis" (作画合成, Sakuga Gōsei). The company is currently owned by Shirō Sagisu, best known for composing scores for the Neon Genesis Evangelion series, and the 2016 Godzilla film, Shin Godzilla.

On August 21, 2024, after almost 18 years after Lion-Maru G the company ceased producing tokusatsu series. P-Pro subsequently announced that they had successfully sold the intellectual property of all their tokusatsu works to Khara, Inc.

== Selected productions ==
=== Anime ===
- Zero-sen Hayato (1964)
- Kurabu-kun no Bōken (1964, 1965) Unaired TV pilot
- Harris no Kaze (1966)
- Donkikko (1967)
- Chibikko Kaiju Yadamon (1967)
- Warera Salaryman Dô (1970)
- Warera Salaryman Tou (1970)

=== Tokusatsu ===
- Ambassador Magma (TV 1966–1967)
- Jaguar Man (TV 1967) Unaired TV pilot
- Hyouman (TV 1967) Unaired TV pilot
- Gokemidoro (TV 1967)
- Monster Prince (TV 1967–1968)
- Goke, Body Snatcher from Hell (1968) - Special effects
- Uchū Enjin Gori (TV 1970) Unaired TV pilot
- Spectreman (TV 1971–1972)
- Kaiketsu Lion-Maru (TV 1972–1973)
- Fuun Lion-Maru (TV 1973)
- Tetsujin Tiger Seven (TV 1973–1974)
- Denjin Zaborger (TV 1974–1975)
- Bouken Rockbat (TV 1975)
- Silver Jaguar (TV 1979, 1980) Unaired TV pilot
- Lion-Maru G (TV 2006)
