= Spectreman =

- Title card for the American release
- Genre: Tokusatsu; Superhero fiction Science fiction Action/Adventure
- Created by: Ushio Sougi
- Country of origin: Japan
- Original language: Japanese
- No. of episodes: 63

Production
- Producers: Tomio Sagisu; Takaharu Bessho (Fuji TV)
- Running time: 25 minutes
- Production companies: P Productions; Fuji Television

Original release
- Network: FNS (Fuji TV)
- Release: January 2, 1971 – March 25, 1972

Spectreman (スペクトルマン, Supekutoruman) is a tokusatsu science fiction superhero television series. Produced by P Productions and created by producer Souji Ushio, the series aired on Fuji TV in Japan from January 2, 1971, to March 25, 1972, with a total of 63 episodes (divided into three segments), not counting the pre-series pilot episode. This was the first major Japanese superhero show of the 1970s, as it began airing three months before Tsuburaya Productions's Return of Ultraman and Toei and Ishimori Productions' Kamen Rider.

== Plot ==
Banished from the peaceful and highly advanced simian Planet E in the Geisty Solar System, the mutant mad scientist Dr. Gori and his brutish gorilla-like assistant Karras (Ra in the Japanese version) search for a new world to rule after Gori's plot to conquer Planet E had been foiled by its government. Traveling to Earth in their flying saucer, the blond alien apeman is captivated by its beauty but appalled by its inhabitants' misuse of its environment, leading to severe pollution (a huge topic back when this series was made, since Tokyo in Japan was the most polluted city in the world at the time), so humankind must be quickly conquered if this planet is to remain habitable. Gori therefore plots - in a twist of irony - to utilise Earth's pollution to create giant monsters to wreak havoc and aid in his goals of taking over the Earth.

Hope comes in the form of the Nebula 71 Star, an artificial satellite resembling twin planet Saturns joined that observes Earth incognito. Fearing that Gori may eventually make Earth uninhabitable, they dispatch Spectreman, their super-cyborg agent, to battle the menace of the mad apeman. Spectreman disguises himself as a Japanese man named Jôji Gamô to walk among the humans and scout out Gori's weekly menace for the Nebula 71 Star. He works with a government-run group called the Pollution G-Men, run by Chief Kurata. This group investigates phenomena involving pollution, but they do not (until late in the show's run) have the facilities to handle giant monsters, so unbeknownst to them, their comical-yet-mysterious teammate Jòji disappears on them, only to help them as Spectreman!

As the series comes to a conclusion, Dr. Gori's subordinates - and even Ra - are largely defeated, forcing the mad scientist to face Spectreman by himself in the last episode. While the hero tries to convince him that his remarkable intelligence should be put at the service of good rather than be used for destruction and tyranny, Gori commits suicide after replying that he would rather die than live with such an inferior and self-destructive race as the humans.

== Spectreman specifications and powers ==
Disguised as a human being (Jôji "George" Gamô), Spectreman requests his transformation from the unseen stern but benevolent Overlord of the Nebula Star, or is ordered by same to do so. Saying "Ryōkai" (了解 - Japanese for "Roger"), or "Ready" in the US version, he raises his right hand towards the Nebula Star, which shoots a beam at him, transforming into Spectreman, a super-powered cyborg in a gold-and-copper cuirass, with a fin-topped full helmet with an angular metal face somewhat resembling the Rocketeer's signature headgear. Before transforming back into a human, however, he simply faints.

Spectreman starts out as human-sized and can increase his size at will.

In addition to superhuman strength and agility and the ability to fly, Spectreman's weapons included:

- Spectre-Flash: Spectreman's ultimate weapon, a rainbow-like energy beam he shoots from his hands or wrists (depending on the pose he performs with his hands).
- Shuriken: Multicolored shuriken, which he pulls from his belt buckle.
- Spectre-Blades: Razor-sharp blades that spring forth from Spectreman's forearms.
- Spectre-Sword & Shield: Sword and shield sent to Spectreman from Nebula Star when requesting them.
- Spectre-Gun: A huge gun sent to Spectreman from Nebula Star when requesting them.

While Spectreman is virtually invincible, he can still be damaged. In one episode, when injured in the leg by an opposing monster, he bled green blood. He bled one other time, when bitten in the neck by a space vampire. Notably, his blood color had changed to bright yellow.

== United States release ==
The entire 63-episode Spectreman series was dubbed into English and syndicated to television stations across North America, including Superstation TBS, starting in the fall of 1978 (more than seven years after the Japanese premiere). The English dubbing was co-written and performed by character actor Mel Welles, who is best known for his performance in the original film version of The Little Shop of Horrors. While the U.S. version is faithful to the original show for the most part, the most notable change is the new theme song created by a song writing team using the song "The First Day of Forever" from the album Awakening by the Mystic Moods Orchestra. The instrumental version was used as a substitute for the Japanese language theme song and was played over action scenes. The instrumental version of the Japanese theme song was usually left alone. Other changes were edits to remove some of the violence considered too intense for a U.S. children's show at the time. The dialogue was sometimes altered to add some of Mr. Welles' offbeat humor. While once available on VHS, the U.S. version has not been released on DVD or Blu-ray.

== Episodes ==
1. The Uncommon enemy (ゴリ・地球を狙う! "Gori, Chikyu o Nerau !")
2. Hedron lives ! (公害怪獣ヘドロンを倒せ! "Kougai-kaiju Hedoron o Taose !")
3. The Threat of Zeron ! (青ミドロの恐怖 "Ao-midoro no Kyoufu")
4. Apeman in the streets ! (ラー地球人をさぐる "Rah, Chikyu-jin o Saguru")
5. Terror of the Pollution People (恐怖の公害人間!! "Kyoufu no Kougai-ningen")
6. Save The Beautiful Earth (美くしい地球のために!! "Utsukusii Chikyu no Tameni !!")
7. The Killer smog (黒の恐怖 "Kuro no Kyoufu")
8. Gokinosaurus (決斗!!ゴキノザウルス "Ketto !! Gokinozaurusu")
9. Attack of the two headed beast (恐怖のネズバートン "Kyoufu no Nezubahdon")
10. Attack of the two headed beast (怪獣列車を阻止せよ!! "Kaiju-ressha o Soshi Seyo")
11. The Man-monster (巨大怪獣ダストマン出現!! "Kyodai-kaiju Dustman Shutsugen !")
12. The Man-monster (よみがえる恐怖!! "Yomigaeru Kyoufu")
13. The Dying sea (ヘドロン大逆襲 (前編) "Hedoron Dai-gyakushu Zenpen")
14. The Dying sea (ヘドロン大逆襲 (后編) "Hedoron Dai-gyakushu Kouhen")
15. The Day the Earth shook (大地震東京を襲う!! "Dai-jishin Tokyo o Osou")
16. The Day the Earth shook (モグネチュードンの反撃!! "Mogunechudon no Hangeki !")
17. Monster from the deep (空とぶ鯨サンダーゲイ "Sora-tobu Kujira Thunder-gei !")
18. The Monster from the deep (怪獣島に潜入せよ!! "Kaiju-tou ni Sennyu Seyo")
19. Terror in New Town (吸血怪獣バクラー現わる!! "Kyuuketsu-kaiju Bakurah Arawaru !")
20. Terror in New Town (怪獣バクラーの巣をつぶせ!! "Kaiju Bakurah no Su o Tsubuse !")
21. Visitor from Zunoh (謎のズノウ星人対ギラギンド "Nazo no Zunou-seijin Tai Giragindo")
22. Visitor from Zunoh (二刀流怪獣ギラギンド大あばれ! "Nitou-ryu Kaiju Giragindo oh-abare !")
23. Hit and run (交通事故怪獣クルマニクラス!! "Koutsuu-jiko Kaiju Kurumanikurasu !")
24. Hit and run (危うし!!クルマニクラス "Ayaushi ! Kurumanikurasu")
25. A Star called Satan (マグラー、サタンキング二大作戦!! "Magurah, Satanking Nidai-sakusen !")
26. A Star called Satan (二大怪獣東京大決戦!! "Nidai-kaiju Tokyo Dai-kessen !")
27. And the dead shall rise (大激戦!!七大怪獣 "Dai-gekisen ! 7 dai-kaiju")
28. The Salamander (サラマンダー恐怖の襲撃!! "Saramandah Kyoufu no Shuhgeki")
29. The Salamander (兇悪怪獣サラマンダーを殺せ!! "Kyouaku-kaiju Saramandah o Korose")
30. Terror from the sea (タッグマッチ怪獣恐怖の上陸!! "Tag Match Kaiju Kyoufu no Jouriku")
31. Terror from the sea (あの灯台を救え!! "Ano Toudai o Sukue !")
32. The Three headed dragon (よみがえる三つ首竜!! "Yomigaeru Mitsu-kubi-ryu")
33. The Three headed dragon (SOS!!海底油田 "SOS ! Kaitei-yuden")
34. The Moon dweller's revenge (ムーンサンダーの怒り!! "Moonthunder no Ikari")
35. The Moon dweller's revenge (スペクトルマンが死んだ!? "Spectreman ga Shinda !?")
36. The Monster hunters (死斗!!Gメン対怪獣ベガロン "Shitou ! G-men tai Kaiju Begaron")
37. Ape men from space (ゴリの円盤基地爆破大作戦!! "Gori no Enban-kichi Bakuha Dai-sakusen")
38. The Floating sphinx (スフィンクス前進せよ!! "Sphinx Zensin seyo")
39. Cave of spiders (怪獣地区突破作戦!! "Kaiju-chiku Toppa-sakusen")
40. The Dancing monster (草笛を吹く怪獣 "Kusa-bue o fuku Kaiju")
41. The Dancing monster (ガス怪獣暁に死す!! "Gas Kaiju Akatsuki ni Shisu")
42. The Mask of evil (宇宙から来た太陽マスク "Uchu kara kita Taiyou-mask")
43. The Mask of evil (怪獣カバゴンの出現!! "Kaiju Kabagon no Shutsugen !!")
44. The Vampire from outer space (宇宙の通り魔キュドラー星人 "Uchu no Tohri-ma Kyudorah-seijin")
45. The Vampire from outer space (パル遊星人よ永遠なれ!! "Pal-yuusei-jin yo Eien nare")
46. Invasion from Gamma (死者からの招待状 "Shisha kara no Shoutai-jou")
47. Invasion from Gamma (ガマ星人攻撃開始!! "Gama-seijin Kougeki Kaishi !!")
48. Smart boy (ボビーよ怪獣になるな!! "Bobby yo Kaiju ni Naruna !!")
49. Smart boy (悲しき天才怪獣ノーマン "Kanashiki Tensai-kaiju Noman")
50. The Igorians are coming (イゴール星人を倒せ!! "Igohru-seijin o Taose !")
51. The Igorians are coming (コバルト怪獣の謎 "Cobalt Kaiju no Nazo")
52. The Birdman (怪獣マウントドラゴン輸送大作戦!! "Mount Dragon Yusou Dai-sakusen !!")
53. The Day the Dog-God howled (恐怖の鉄の爪 "Kyoufu no Tetsu no Tsume")
54. The Day the Dog-God howled (打倒せよ!!コンピューター怪獣 "Datou-seyo ! Computer-kaiju")
55. The Lone Comet (スペクトルマン暗殺指令!! "Spectreman Ansatsu-shirei")
56. The Lone Comet (宇宙の殺し屋流星仮面 "Uchu no Korosi-ya Ryusei-kamen")
57. The Space witch (魔女グレートサタンの復活 "Majo Great Satan no Fukkatsu")
58. The Space witch (まぼろしの怪獣ゴルダ "Maborosi no Kaiju Goruda")
59. The Killer formula (地獄の使者ジェノス星人 "Jigoku no Shisha Genos-seijin")
60. The Killer formula (怪獣ドクロン死の踊り "Kaiju Dokuron Shi no Odori")
61. Fun City caper (恐怖の怪獣ショー "Kyoufu no Kaiju-show")
62. The Flash game (最後の死斗だ猿人ゴリ!! "Saigo no Shitou da Enjin Gori")
63. The Flash game (さようならスペクトルマン "Sayounara Spectreman")

== In popular culture ==
Tuyama made a Spectreman Bowling Pump water gun in 1971. It resembled a bowling pin with an SD Spectreman sticker.

Spectreman was parodied in the Franco-Belgian series Télechat as Leguman. Rather than being made of machinery, Leguman was made of vegetables with carrots for arms, pea pods for legs, a jack o'lantern pumpkin for a head, and a radish chest emblem on his leotard, and he engaged in brief inane low budget live action battles with bizarre robot monsters based on everyday items (vacuum cleaners, juicers, etc.) in mundane urban settings, all while a male voice chanted his repetitive Spectreman-inspired theme song.

Spectreman is shown in the graphic novel The Arab of the Future by Riad Sattouf, as a Japanese TV show that the protagonist, as a kid, watches in Libya. The protagonist's father makes racist remarks, comparing ape-like villains with Africans, but the protagonist notices similitudes between Dr. Gori and his father.

The antagonist of the series Space Dandy, Dr. Gel, was inspired partially by Dr. Gori.

The hand gestures of the Powerpuff Girls character Mojo Jojo are clearly a tribute to Dr. Gori.

In Thailand, the series aired in 1972, leading to a large number of makers of toy products related to Spectreman, including a play money known as Bank Gamô (according Spectreman's human form name) and is still popularly known to this day.

Dr. Gori and Rah make guest appearances in the 2005 film Cromartie High – The Movie based on the manga Cromartie High School.

== See also ==
- Gorgo (film)
