= Lion-Maru =

Japanese television franchise

Lion-Maru (ライオン丸, Raionmaru) is a Japanese tokusatsu television franchise that began in 1972 by P Productions as Extraordinary Hero Lion-Maru. The basic premise of the series is that the main character has the ability to transform into a superpowered anthropomorphic lion, usually wielding a katana. The original two series were set in feudal Japan and were, essentially, tokusatsu versions of the samurai dramas that were extremely popular at the time. The 2006 program, Lion-Maru G, is set in the near future, but still uses the samurai motif for the designs of the main characters.

== Series ==
- Kaiketsu Lion-Maru (1972)
- Fuun Lion-Maru (1973)
- Lion-Maru G (2006)
