= Fuun Lion-Maru =

- Fuun Lion-Maru opening credits
- Genre: Tokusatsu; Superhero fiction Action/Adventure; Fantasy
- Created by: Koji Bessho, Tomio Sagisu
- Country of origin: Japan
- No. of episodes: 25

Production
- Producer: P Productions
- Running time: 25 minutes

Original release
- Network: Fuji Television Network
- Release: April 14 – September 29, 1973

Fuun Lion-Maru (風雲ライオン丸, Fūun Raionmaru; lit. Storm Cloud Lion Maru), known as Lion-Man outside Japan, was a tokusatsu television series that aired on the Fuji Television Network in Japan in 1973. Produced by P Productions — the studio behind its previous tokusatsu series including Magma Taishi, Spectreman and Kaiketsu Lion-Maru, it was the second series in the Lion-Maru trilogy, and featured a third Maru-like character named Black Jaguar. It also reunites only two actors: Tetsuya Ushio as Shishimaru (Lion Maru) and Yoshitaka Fukushima as Jonosuke (Tiger Joe), since Akiko Kujo and Norihiko Umechi were not featured in the sequel series, who are replaced by Ryoko Miyano and Tsunehiro Arai. This Lion-Maru is deemed "the Rolling Tempest Ninja Warrior."

== Story ==
The series has its context in Feudal Japan where, for any warrior, more important than life itself was to maintain his honor. It tells the story of Dan Shishimaru, a 22-year-old samurai who, after having his brother Dan Kage Noshin killed by Nezuma, a human monster allied with the evil group Mantle, goes into battle with a desire for revenge and justice.

Like the original Shishimaru, Dan Shishimaru has the ability to transform into a superpowered anthropomorphic lion, wielding a special katana.

== Cast ==
=== Main Cast ===
- Shishimaru Dan/Lion Maru (voice): Tetsuya Ushio
- Shinobu: Ryoko Miyano
- Sankichi/Taro (ep 14): Tsunehiro Arai
- Hyoba Kurokage/Black Jaguar (voice) (2-11 & 25) : Masaki Hayasaki
- Jōnosuke Tora/Tiger Joe (voice): Yoshitaka Fukushima
- Nijino Nanairo (17-20, 22 & 24): Naoyuki Sugano

=== Voice Actors ===
- Mantle God: Kiyoshi Kobayashi
- Agdar: Tōru Ōhira (ep 1), Yoshiaki Yoda (2-23)
- Narrator/Monsters: Masaki Okabe
- Kaiketsu Lion Man (voice) (ep 9): Tetsuya Ushio
- Shizue (voice) (ep 17 & 18): Ryoko Miyano

=== Stunt Actors ===
- Fuun Lion-Maru: Kanehiro Nomiyama
- Tiger Joe, Jr.: Kenzo Nakayama, Masami Yogawa
- Kaiketsu Lion Man: Kazuo Kamoshida
- Agdar: Hiroshi Mihara
- Monsters: Hajime Araki, Hiromi Hara
- Shizue (17 & 18): Noriko Egawa

== Music ==
Opening Theme

- "Yuke tomoyo Lion-Maru yo" (行け友よ ライオン丸よ) by George Hama (浜ジョージ, Hama Jōji) & Blue Angels (ブルーエンジェルス, Buruu Enjerusu)

Ending Theme

- "Ikuzo! Lion-Maru" (行くぞ! ライオン丸) by Shouji Wada (和田昭治, Wada Shōji) & Young Echoes (ヤングエコーズ, Yangu Ekōzu)

== International Broadcasts and Home Video ==
- In its home country of Japan, the series was released in full on Laserdisc as a 7-disc collection set by Nikkatsu Video on December 24, 1993, titled the "Fuun Lion Maru Perfect Collection." The set contains all 25 episodes of the series. On April 25, 2000, the series was re-released again by Esmock as a new 7-disc collection lineup containing all 25 episodes. On March 25, 2005, Amusesoft released a DVD boxset of the series containing all 25 episodes of the series titled "Fuun Lion Maru Premium Collector's Edition Bullet Box." The series has never been released under any individual singular DVD.
- The only region in the world besides Japan to air all 25 episodes of this series was in Brazil back in 1989, where it was popularized. It aired on the now-defunct Rede Manchete under Lion-Man (but also Poderoso Lion Man as what the character is known there) with a Brazilian Portuguese dub and due to its success, it caused them to also air the first series Kaiketsu Lion-Maru. The series was also released on home video by Top Tape.
