= Kaiketsu Lion-Maru =

- Lion-Maru
- Genre: Tokusatsu; Superhero fiction Action/Adventure; Fantasy
- Created by: Koji Bessho; Tomio Sagisu
- Composer: Asei Kobayashi
- Country of origin: Japan
- No. of episodes: 54

Production
- Producers: Koji Bessho; Tomio Sagisu; Shigeru Shinohara
- Running time: 25 minutes
- Production company: P Productions

Original release
- Network: Fuji Television Network
- Release: April 1, 1972 – April 7, 1973

Related
- Fuun Lion-Maru

Extraordinary Hero Lion-Maru (快傑ライオン丸, Kaiketsu Raionmaru; lit. The Extraordinary Lion Knight, also translated as The Vigilant Lion Knight and Swift Hero Lion Knight) was a Japanese tokusatsu television series in the Lion-Maru franchise that aired in 1972–1973, produced by P Productions and set during Japan's Sengoku period (the Age of Warring States).

== Plot ==
During the late 16th century (September 1, 1567 to December 31, 1600), a trio of ninja orphans are wandering Japan and saving people from evil by battling a villain of the week in each episode, all of which are serving the devil known as Gousan. The main character, Shishimaru, has been granted the ability to transform into a superpowered anthropomorphic white lion, usually wielding a katana.

== Characters ==
- Shishimaru (獅子丸): A man who becomes Lion-Maru (ライオン丸, Raionmaru) by unsheathing the katana Kinsachi (キンサチ) and uttering the words "O Wind! O Light! Ninja Art: Lion Change!" (「風よ！光よ！忍法：獅子変化！」, Kaze yo! Hikari yo! Ninpō: Shishi-Henge!) to take on the power.
- Saori (沙織, Saori): An acrobatic female fighter who often becomes a damsel in distress.
- Kosuke (小助, Kosuke): The young boy who uses his flute to summon the winged horse known as Hikarimaru.
- Gousan (豪山, Gōsan): The series' chief villain.
- Tora Jōnosuke (虎 錠之介, Tora Jōnosuke) (episodes 27-30, 36-54): A man recruited by Gosun, given the mysterious sword Ginsachi (ギンサチ) to become Tiger Joe (タイガージョー, Taigā Jō).
- Kashinkouji (家臣工事): The elderly mentor who adopted the three war orphans (Shishimaru, Saori, and Kosuke) and taught them everything they know. After perishing from an attack by Gousan's forces, his souls is reincarnated as the winged horse known as Hikarimaru.

== Episodes ==
1. Emissary of Darkness Orochi (魔王の使者オロチ, Maō no shisha orochi)
2. Beat It!! Monster Yamawaro Child (倒せ‼怪人ヤマワロ童子, Taose!! Kaijin yamawaro dōji)
3. The Demon Forest: Wakuranba (魔の森 わくらんば, Ma no Mori: Wakuranba)
4. Musasabian: Explosion Plan!! (ムササビアン 爆破作戦！！, Musasabian: bakuha sakusen!!)
5. Obo, the Grim Reaper Who Came From Hell (地獄から来た死神オボ, Jigoku kara kita Shinigami Obo)
6. The Man-Eating Flower Flowander (人食い花フラワンダー, Jin gui hana furawandā)
7. The Cursed Gold Mine: Ginzame (呪われた金山 ギンザメ, Norowareta Kanayama: Ginzame)
8. Shadow Clone Demon King Debonoba and Monster Iwageba (分身魔王デボノバと怪人イワゲバ, Bunshin Maō Debonoba to Kaijin Iwageba)
9. The Vampire Who Calls Death, Monster Zombie (死を呼ぶ吸血怪人ゾンビー, Shi o Yobu Kyūketsu Kaijin Zonbī)
10. Water of Death: Poison Newt (死の水 ドクイモリ, Shi no Mizu: Dokuimori)
11. Wolf of Hell, Kamakirian! (地獄の狼カマキリアン！, Jigoku no ōkami Kamakirian!)
12. Monster Gilozie: The Sea's Pits (怪人ギロジー 海の落し穴, Kaijin Girojī Umi no Otoshiana)
13. Monster Umikaburo and The Man-Eating Merman (怪人ウミカブロと人食い怪魚, Kaijin Umikaburo to Hito-gui Kaigyo)
14. The Wandering Monster Nezuganda (さすらいの怪人ネズガンダ, Sasurai no Kaijin Nezuganda)
15. Elethunder: The Duel On The Hell Valley (エレサンダー 地獄谷の決闘, Eresandā: Jigokudani no Kettō)
16. The Creeping Hands of Evil: Meleonga (忍びよる魔の手 メレオンガ, Shinobi yoru Ma no Te Mereonga)
17. Monster Jeromo: The Demonic Beacon (怪人ジェロモ 悪魔のノロシ, Kaijin Jeromo Akuma no Noroshi)
18. Monster Muiodoro: The Call of The Blessed Mountain! (怪人ムイオドロ 恵山の叫び！, Kaijin Muiodoro: Esan no sakebi!)
19. The Monster Who Takes Children: The Confrontation at Sunset! (子連れ怪人 夕陽の対決！, Kozure Kaijin: Yūhi no Taiketsu!)
20. The Killer Pursuer Kumaoroji (殺しの追跡者クマオロジ, Koroshi no Tsuisekisha Kumaoroji)
21. Hannyarasu: A Mother's Love Lullaby (ハンニャラス 母恋い子守唄, Hannyarasu: Kaha koi komori uta)
22. The Stolen Pipe: Monster Kibagira (盗まれた笛 怪人キバギラー, Nusumareta Fue: Kaijin Kibagirā)
23. The Snake and Scorpion Monster Dakatsu (蛇と蝎の怪人ダカツ, Hebi to Sasori no Kaijin Dakatsu)
24. Lion Flying Slash vs Monster Tobimusashi (ライオン飛行斬り対怪人トビムサシ, Raion Hikō-giri tai Kaijin Tobimusashi)
25. Shadow Hunter Monster Mothgiger (影狩り怪人モスガイガー, Kagegari Kaijin Mosugaigā)
26. The Last Defense Captain Kuwarugirubi (最後の守備隊長クワルギルビ, Saigo no Shubi Taichō Kuwarugirubi)
27. Great Demon King Gorsun Gets Mad! (大魔王ゴースン怒る！, Dai maō Gōsun okoru!)
28. The Evil Swordsman Tiger Joe (悪の剣士タイガージョー, Aku no kenshi Taigā Jō)
29. Three Shadows: Monster Dokuronga (影三つ 怪人ドクロンガ, Kage mittsu: Kaijin dokuronga)
30. Monster Matsubaraba: The Mystery of The Solitary Pine Tree (怪人マツバラバ 一本松の謎, Kaijin Matsubaraba: Ipponmatsu no nazo)
31. The Demon Sword of Resentment: Orochi Junior (怨みの魔剣 オロチジュニア, Urami no Maken: Orochi Junia)
32. Gamaurufu: The Note's Secret (ガマウルフ 覚え書の秘密, Gamaurufu: Oboesho no Himitsu)
33. The Heartless Robber: Gamemadara (非情の盗賊 ガメマダラ, Hijō no Tōzoku: Gamemadara)
34. The Killer Melody: Monster Pandaran (殺しのメロディ 怪人パンダラン, Koroshi no Merodi: Kaijin Pandaran)
35. Laughing In Blood Monster Arisazen (血に笑う怪人アリサゼン, Chi ni Warau Kaijin Arisazen)
36. The Broken Spear: Monster Hachigaraga (折れた槍 怪人ハチガラガ, Oreta Yari: Kaijin Hachigaraga)
37. The Targeted Man: Monster Todokazura (狙われた男 怪人トドカズラ, Nerawareta Otoko: Kaijin Todokazura)
38. Gorsun's Secret: Monster Tatsudorodo (ゴースンの秘密 怪人タツドロド, Gōsun no Himitsu: Kaijin Tatsudorodo)
39. Monster Kichiku: The Evil Buddha (怪人キチク 悪の念佛, Kaijin Kichiku: Aku no Nenfutsu)
40. Great Demon King Gorsun: Gets Mad Once Again! (大魔王ゴースン 再び怒る！, Dai maō Gōsun: Futatabi okoru!)
41. Great Demon King Gorsun: Aim For That Heart! (大魔王ゴースン あの胸を狙え！, Dai maō Gōsun: Ano mune o nerae!)
42. The Killer Stranger: Kilgod (殺しの流れ者 キルゴッド, Koroshi no Nagaremono: Kirugoddo)
43. Betrayal's Ridge: Monster Girara (裏切りの峠 怪人ギララ, Uragiri no Tōge: Kaijin Girara)
44. A Female Ninja's Tears: Monster Meganda (くの一の涙 怪人メガンダ, Kunoichi no Namida: Kaijin Meganda)
45. A Runaway Ninja's Animal Path: Monster Hanzaki (抜け忍けもの道 怪人ハンザキ, Nukenin Kemono-michi: Kaijin Hanzaki)
46. The Biwa Master of Darkness: Monster Noizer (暗闇の琵琶法師 怪人ノイザー, Kurayami no Biwa-hōshi: Kaijin Noizā)
47. The Coffin of Hell: Monster Jenma (地獄の棺桶 怪人ジェンマ, Jigoku no Kanoke: Kaijin Jenma)
48. The Hitman Covered In Wounds: Monster Mafian (傷だらけの殺し屋 怪人マフィアン, Kizu darake no Koroshiya: Kaijin Mafian)
49. The Terrifying Butcher: Monster Jammla (恐るべき屠殺人 怪人ジャムラ, Osoreru-beki tosatsujin: Kaijin Jamura)
50. Hang Up Lionmaru!! Monster Juukaku (ライオン丸を吊るせ‼怪人ジュウカク, Raionmaru o Tsuruse!! Kaijin Jūkaku)
51. The Final Eight: Monster Avter (最後の八人衆 怪人アブター, Saigo no Hachinin-shū: Kaijin Abutā)
52. The Fast-Drawing Six-Chambered Revolver: Monster Gunrad (早射ち六連発 怪人ゴンラッド, Hayauchi Roku-renpatsu: Kaijin Gonraddo)
53. The Sad Tiger Joe's End! (悲しきタイガージョーの最期！, Kanashiki Taigā Jō no Saigo!)
54. Lion-Maru: The Final Battle To The Death (ライオン丸 最後の死闘, Raionmaru: Saigo no Shitō)

== Cast ==
- Tetsuya Ushio as Shishimaru / Kaiketsu Lion Maru (voice)
- Akiko Kujō as Saori
- Norihiko Umechi as Kosuke
- Kazuo Kamoshida as Kaiketsu Lion Maru (suit actor)
- Shingo Fukushima as Tiger Joe (suit actor)
- Kiyoshi Kobayashi as Akuma Gosun / Devil Gosuun (voice)
- Kōji Tonohiro as Tora Jōnosuke / Tiger Joe (voice) [episodes 27-30, 36-41]
- Yoshitaka Fukushima as Tora Jōnosuke / Tiger Joe (voice) [episodes 42-54]
- Daisaku Shinohara as Narrator

== Music ==
Opening Theme

- "Kaze yo Hikari yo" (風よ光よ; "Oh Wind, Oh Light") by Yuuki Hide (秀夕木, Hide Yuuki) & Young Fresh (ヤング・フレッシュ, Yangu Furesshu)

Ending Themes

- "Lion-Maru ga yatte kuru" (ライオン丸がやってくる; "Lion-Maru is coming") by Young Fresh (ヤング・フレッシュ, Yangu Furesshu)

== International broadcasts and home video ==
- The series was released in Japan on DVD on October 25, 2002 to commemorate the series' 30th anniversary broadcasting, via Volume 1. Then on December 25, 2002, Volume 2 of the series was broadcast. A DVD boxset that contains all 54 episodes of the series was released on March 26, 2008.
- It was broadcast in Thailand around 1974 every Sunday on Channel 5 in Thai dubbed, as Nakak Sing (Thai: หน้ากากสิงห์, lit. Lion Mask).
- The series was broadcast in Italy in 1983, dubbed, as Ultralion.
- The series was also dubbed into English, but only one episode (the first) surfaced in North America, released on a VHS tape in 1986 distributed by Kids Klassics and also by Remco through other copies, entitled Magic of the Ninja and sold through toy store chains such as Toys R Us.
- It was aired in Brazil with a Brazilian Portuguese dub under the title Lion Man (or otherwise known as Lion Man Branco as he became known in the region) on Rede Manchete in 1990, following the success of airing its sequel series Fuun Lion-Maru first. But unlike that, this series was reportedly a flop and it did not last long on the network, given that the sequel was more popular and that one actually aired first. Only about 22 out of 54 episodes were dubbed.

== DVD release ==
In P Productions' publicity materials for the 2002 DVD release, Lion Maru was subtitled The Beast-Transformed Ninja Warrior.

Preceded by N/A	Lion-Maru; 1972	Succeeded by Fuun Lion-Maru
