= List of ninja films =

The following is a list of films where at least one ninja character appears as a significant plot element.

== Japanese cinema ==
=== Jidai-geki films ===
Jidai-geki (時代劇), which literally means "period drama", is a genre of film, television, and theatre in Japan whose stories are historical dramas set prior to, during, or shortly after the Edo period of Japanese history, from 1603 to 1868.
Title	Release Date
Nindo Keppuroku (忍道血風録)	1937.11.25
Jiraiya (自来也) [aka Child of Thunder (忍術三妖傳)]	1937.12.31
Enoken no Sarutobi Sasuke Enoken no Sarutobi Sasuke Part 1 (エノケンの猿飛佐助 ありゃありゃの巻) Enoken no Sarutobi Sasuke Part 2 (エノケンの猿飛佐助 どろんどろんの巻)	1937.12.31; 1938.01.07
Ninjutsu Sekigahara Sarutobi Sasuke (忍術関ケ原 猿飛佐助)	1938.12.01
Iga Goetogun-Ryu (伊賀越東軍流)	1941.10.30
Sarutobi Sasuke: 1001 Nights of Ninjutsu (猿飛佐助 忍術千一夜)	1947.02.25
Kakute Ninjutsu Eiga wa Owarinu (かくて忍術映画は終りぬ)	1948.05.18
Shimikin no Ninjutsu Dekoboko Dochu (シミキンの忍術凸凹道中)	1949.05.23
Sarutobi Sasuke's Fire Festival (猿飛佐助 千丈ケ獄の火祭り)	1950.06.17
Ehon Sarutobi Sasuke (絵本猿飛佐助)	1953.02.19
Ninjutsu Makaritoru (忍術罷り通る)	1953.12.01
Sanada's Ten Braves Sanada's Ten Braves Part 1 (真田十勇士 第一篇 忍術猿飛佐助) Sanada's Ten Braves Part 2 (真田十勇士 第二篇 忍術霧隠才蔵) Sanada's Ten Braves Part 3 (真田十勇士 第三篇 忍術腕くらべ)	1954.01.21; 1954.01.21; 1954.01.21
Tanko Tanki Chindochu Dai Ichi-bu Mamedanuki Ninjutsu Gassen (たん子たん吉珍道中 第1部 豆狸忍術合戦)	1954.09.14
Ninjutsu Jiraiya Ninjutsu Jiraiya (忍術児雷也) Orochimaru's Counterattack (逆襲大蛇丸)	1955.01.03; 1955.01.29
Sarutobi Sasuke (猿飛佐助)	1955.05.03
Ninjutsu Sanshiro (忍術三四郎)	1955.08.22
Ninjutsu Sagenta (忍術左源太)	1956.01.08
Ninjutsu Studying Warrior (忍術武者修業)	1956.04.11
Ninjutsu Championship Tournament (忍術選手権試合)	1956.05.25
Ninjutsu Kaidanji (忍術快男児)	1956.09.05
Ninja's Weapon (妖蛇の魔殿)	1956.10.31
Mysteries of Edo (ふり袖捕物帖 若衆変化)	1956.11.07
Fuun Kyunari Osaka-jo Sanada Juyushiso Shingun (風雲急なり大阪城 真田十勇死総進軍)	1957.02.27
Yagyū Bugeichō [numerous adaptations of the novel by Kōsuke Gomi.] Yagyu Secret Scrolls (柳生武芸帳) Yagyu Secret Scrolls 2: Two Secret Swords (柳生武芸帳 双龍秘剣) Yagyu Chronicles 1: The Secret Scrolls (柳生武芸帳) Yagyu Chronicles 2: The Secret Sword (柳生武芸帳 夜ざくら秘剣) Yagyu Chronicles 3: The Valley of Outlaws (柳生一番勝負 無頼の谷) Yagyu Chronicles 4: One-Eyed Swordsman (柳生武芸帳 独眼一刀流) Yagyu Chronicles 5: Jubei's Redemption (柳生武芸帳 片目の十兵衛) Yagyu Chronicles 6: The Yagyu Scroll (柳生武芸帳 片目水月の剣) Yagyu Chronicles 7: The Cloud of Disorder (柳生武芸帳 剣豪乱れ雲) Yagyu Chronicles 8: The One-Eyed Ninja (柳生武芸帳 片目の忍者) Yagyu Chronicles 9: Assassin's Sword (十兵衛暗殺剣) Fuun Yagyu Bugeicho Part 1 (風雲柳生武芸帳 第一部 筑紫に燃える 野望の火花) [TV movie/mini-series] Fuun Yagyu Bugeicho Part 2 (風雲柳生武芸帳 第二部 江戸城妖花の園 魔性を斬る小太刀) [TV movie/mini-series] Fuun Yagyu Bugeicho Part 3 (風雲柳生武芸帳 第三部 尾張に渦巻く陰謀 天白ヶ原の決闘) [TV movie/mini-series] Fuun Yagyu Bugeicho Part 4 (風雲柳生武芸帳 第四部 秘剣水月京洛の舞 十兵衛推参) [TV movie/mini-series] Fuun Yagyu Bugeicho Part 5 (風雲柳生武芸帳 第五部 危うし新陰流！ 薩摩に散る恋) [TV movie/mini-series] Fuun Yagyu Bugeicho Part 6 (風雲柳生武芸帳 第六部 徳川最大の危機 嵐を呼ぶ活人剣) [TV movie/mini-series] Yagyu Bugeicho 1 (柳生武芸帳) [TV movie] Yagyu Bugeicho 2: Jubei's 50 Kills (柳生武芸帳 十兵衛五十人斬り) [TV movie] Yagyu Bugeicho 3: Great Conspiracy in the Capital! Jubei and the Puzzling Princess (柳生武芸帳 京に渦巻く大陰謀！ 十兵衛と謎の姫君) [TV movie] Yagyu Bugeicho 4: Jubei's Violent Travels (柳生武芸帳 十兵衛あばれ旅) [TV movie] Yagyu Bugeicho 5: Jubei's Violent Travels, Date's 620,000 Koku Conspiracy (柳生武芸帳 十兵衛あばれ旅 伊達六十二万石の陰謀) [TV movie] Yagyu Bugeicho Part 1 (柳生武芸帳 第一部 激震！江戸城武芸帳強奪) [TV movie/mini-series] Yagyu Bugeicho Part 2 (柳生武芸帳 第二部 武蔵対柳生！尾張の対決) [TV movie/mini-series] Yagyu Bugeicho Part 3 (柳生武芸帳 第三部 天下騒乱～十兵衛最後の闘い！) [TV movie/mini-series]	1957.04.14; 1958.01.03; 1961.03.01; 1961.03.19; 1961.10.22; 1962.09.16; 1963.02.23; 1963.05.25; 1963.08.07; 1963.12.21; 1964.10.14; 1985.01.02; 1985.01.02; 1985.01.02; 1985.01.02; 1985.01.02; 1985.01.02; 1990.04.02; 1990.10.01; 1991.04.01; 1991.10.01; 1992.04.08; 2010.01.02; 2010.01.02; 2010.01.02
Ninjutsu Wakashu Tenma Kotaro (忍術若衆 天馬小太郎)	1957.10.29
Torawakamaru the Koga Ninja (忍術御前試合)	1957.12.15
The Secret of the Scroll (忍術水滸伝 稲妻小天狗)	1958.01.29
Young Sarutobi Sasuke Young Sarutobi Sasuke (少年猿飛佐助) Young Sarutobi Sasuke and the Imprisoned Princess (少年猿飛佐助 牢獄の姫君) Young Sarutobi Sasuke and the Flying White Horse (少年猿飛佐助 天空の白馬)	1958.02.05; 1958.02.12; 1958.02.19
The Spy Phantom (隠密変化)	1959.04.24
Detective Hibari: Hidden Coin (ひばり捕物帖 ふり袖小判)	1959.11.15
The Three Magicians (忍術武者修行)	1960.01.21
Koga's Secret Messenger (甲賀の密使) [aka Wrath of the Koga Ninja]	1960.05.18
Bored Hatamoto: Riddle of the Assassin's Group (旗本退屈男 謎の暗殺隊)	1960.06.29
Ninjutsu Castles Ninjutsu at Sanada Castle (忍術真田城) Ninjutsu at Osaka Castle (忍術大阪城)	1960.12.27; 1961.02.08
Daredevil in the Castle (大阪城物語)	1961.01.03
Case of Umon: The Nanbanzame Murders (右門捕物帖 南蛮鮫)	1961.01.15
Ninja Messenger and the Three Daughters Ninja Messenger and the Three Daughters (忍術使いと三人娘) Ninja Messenger and the Three Daughters: Female Fox Goblin (忍術使いと三人娘 女狐変化)	1961.05.11; 1961.07.02
Strike of the Jaguma (怪獣蛇九魔の猛襲)	1961.07.26
The Red Shadow (赤い影法師)	1961.12.24
Shadow of Hell (地獄の影法師)	1962.11.11
Shinobi no Mono anthology series Shinobi no Mono (忍びの者 Shinobi no Mono 2: Vengeance (続・忍びの者) Shinobi no Mono 3: Resurrection (新・忍びの者) Shinobi no Mono 4: Siege (忍びの者 霧隠才蔵) Shinobi no Mono 5: Mist Saizo Returns (忍びの者 続・霧隠才蔵) Shinobi no Mono 6: Iga Mansion (忍びの者 伊賀屋敷) Shinobi no Mono 7: Mist Saizo Strikes Back (忍びの者 新・霧隠才蔵) Shinobi no Mono 8: Three Enemies (新書・忍びの者) Mission: Iron Castle (忍びの衆)	1962.12.01; 1963.08.10; 1963.12.28; 1964.07.11; 1964.12.30; 1965.06.12; 1966.02.12; 1966.12.10; 1970.02.07
Warring Clans (戦国野郎)	1963.03.24
Castle of Owls Castle of Owls (忍者秘帖 梟の城) Owls' Castle (梟の城) [remake]	1963.03.24; 1999.10.30
Sasuke and his Comedians (真田風雲録)	1963.06.02
Kagemaru of the Iga Clan (伊賀の影丸)	1963.07.24
Seventeen Ninja Seventeen Ninja (十七人の忍者) Seventeen Ninja: The Great Battle (十七人の忍者 大血戦) Seventeen Ninja (十七人の忍者) [TV movie remake]	1963.07.07; 1966.01.26; 1990.10.10
Ukyonosuke Ukyonosuke On Patrol (右京之介巡察記) Ukyonosuke's Reverse Ichimonji Cut (紫右京之介 逆一文字斬り)	1963.11.20; 1964.03.12
Whirlwind (士魂魔道 大龍巻)	1964.01.13
Warrior of the Wind (風の武士)	1964.01.15
The Daimyo Spy (忍び大名)	1964.01.25
The Third Ninja (第三の忍者)	1964.03.01
Ninja Hunt Ninja Hunt (忍者狩り) Ninja Hunt (忍者狩り) [TV movie remake]	1964.09.05; 1982.04.09
The Spy Swordsman [films based on The Samurai TV series] The Spy Swordsman (隠密剣士) The Spy Swordsman Returns (続隠密剣士)	1964.03.28; 1964.08.01
The Thief in Black (黒の盗賊)	1964.12.24
Ninja Breakup by Assassination (忍法破り必殺)	1964.12.26
Samurai Spy (異聞猿飛佐助)	1965.07.10
Watari the Ninja Boy (大忍術映画 ワタリ)	1966.07.21
Black Ninja (まぼろし黒頭巾 闇に飛ぶ影)	1966.09.08
Golden Ninja (冒険大活劇 黄金の盗賊)	1966.12.13
The Magic Serpent (怪竜大決戦)	1966.12.21
Red Shadow Ninja Scope: Red Shadow (飛び出す冒険映画 赤影) Red Shadow: The Masked Ninja (仮面の忍者赤影) [TV movie remake] Red Shadow (赤影) [remake]	1969.07.20; 1985.08.26; 2001.08.11
Bounty Hunter Bounty Hunter 1: The Killer's Mission (賞金稼ぎ) Bounty Hunter 2: The Fort of Death (五人の賞金稼) Bounty Hunter 3: Eight Men to Kill! (賞金首 一瞬八人斬り)	1969.08.13; 1969.12.13; 1972.12.16
Earth Ninja Chronicles: Duel in the Wind (土忍記 風の天狗)	1970.11.14
Lone Wolf and Cub [adaptations of the manga by Kazuo Koike and Goseki Kojima.] Lone Wolf and Cub: Sword of Vengeance (子連れ狼 子を貸し腕貸しつかまつる) Lone Wolf and Cub: Baby Cart at the River Styx (子連れ狼 三途の川の乳母車) Lone Wolf and Cub: Baby Cart to Hades (子連れ狼 死に風に向う乳母車) Lone Wolf and Cub: Baby Cart in Peril (子連れ狼 親の心子の心) Lone Wolf and Cub: Baby Cart in the Land of Demons (子連れ狼 冥府魔道) Lone Wolf and Cub: White Heaven in Hell (子連れ狼 地獄へ行くぞ！大五郎) Lone Wolf and Cub (子連れ狼) [TV movie remake] Lone Wolf and Cub: Assassin on the Road to Hell (子連れ狼 冥府魔道の刺客人) [TV movie remake] Lone Wolf and Cub: Final Conflict (子連れ狼 その小さき手に) [reimagining]	1972.01.15; 1972.04.22; 1972.09.02; 1972.12.30; 1973.08.11; 1974.04.24; 1984.03.01; 1989.10.05; 1993.02.06
Shadow Hunters Shadow Hunters (影狩り) Shadow Hunters: Hero's Gun (影狩り ほえろ大砲) Shadow Hunters (影狩り) [TV movie remake] Shadow Hunters (影狩り) [TV movie remake]	1972.06.10; 1972.10.10; 1983.10.06; 1992.04.08
Demon Spies (鬼輪番)	1974.02.09
Ninja Spy (忍術 猿飛佐助)	1976.07.24
The Yagyu Conspiracy Shogun's Samurai: The Yagyu Clan Conspiracy (柳生一族の陰謀) The Yagyu Conspiracy (柳生一族の陰謀) [TV movie remake] The Yagyu Conspiracy (柳生一族の陰謀) [TV movie remake]	1978.01.21; 2008.09.28; 2020.04.11
Renegade Ninjas (真田幸村の謀略) [aka The Shogun Assassins] [aka The Strategy of Sanada Yukimura]	1979.09.01
Oedo Sosamo [films based on the Ōedo Sōsamō TV series] Onmitsu Doshin: The Edo Secret Police (隠密同心 大江戸捜査網) Oedo Sosamo 2015 ~Onmitsu Doshin, Aku o Kiru! (大江戸捜査網2015～隠密同心、悪を斬る!) [TV movie special]	1979.12.01; 2015.01.02
Shadow Warriors [film and direct-to-video series connected to the Shadow Warriors TV series] Shadow Warriors: Hattori Hanzo (影の軍団 服部半蔵) New Shadow Warriors (新・影の軍団) New Shadow Warriors II (新・影の軍団II) New Shadow Warriors III (新・影の軍団III 地雷火) New Shadow Warriors IV (新・影の軍団IV 地雷火) New Shadow Warriors V (新・影の軍団V 服部半蔵VS陰陽師) New Shadow Warriors VI (新・影の軍団VI 最終章)	1980.02.23; 2003.03.22; 2003.05.25; 2003.09.20; 2004.02.25; 2005.02.25; 2005.06.25
Shogun's Ninja (忍者武芸帖 百地三太夫)	1980.11.15
Red Lightning: The Shadow Ninja Warriors (赤い稲妻 将軍吉宗の母を救え！影の忍者軍団決死の(秘)作戦) [TV movie]	1981.03.05
Ninja Gangsters Ninja Gangsters: Extorting from the Bad! (隠密くずれ 悪い奴から強請りとれ！) [TV movie] Ninja Gangsters II: Lullaby From Hell (隠密くずれII 地獄の子守唄) [TV movie] Ninja Gangsters III: The Missing Daimyo Proccession [sic] (隠密くずれIII 消えた大名行列) [TV movie] Ninja Gangsters IV: The Mysterious Golden Castle (隠密くずれIV 変幻くノ一黄金城の秘密) [TV movie]	1981.07.10; 1982.02.05; 1983.03.18; 1983.08.26
Shinobi Chushingura (忍びの忠臣蔵) [TV movie]	1981.12.18
Fangs of Darkness Fangs of Darkness: Vengeance (新・御金蔵破り) [TV movie] Fangs of Darkness: The Head of Ieyasu (御金蔵破り 家康の首) [TV movie]	1982.03.19; 1983.01.14
Onna Kirigakure Saizo: Sengoku Ninja Fuun Roku (おんな霧隠才蔵 戦国忍者風雲録) [TV movie]	1982.03.26
Oniwaban: Shinobi no Kozu (お庭番 忍びの構図) [TV movie]	1983.10.20
Tokugawa Chronicles: Ambition of the Three Branches (徳川風雲録 御三家の野望) [TV movie/mini-series]	1986.01.02
Death Shadows (十手舞)	1986.09.20
Hissatsu! The Ōoku's Lady Kasuga's Secret (必殺スペシャル・新春 決定版!大奥、春日野局の秘密 主水、露天風呂で初仕事) [TV movie]	1989.01.03
Shogun's Shadow (将軍家光の乱心 激突)	1989.01.04
Female Ninja Kagero Group Female Ninja Kagero Group (女忍かげろう組) [TV movie] Female Ninja Kagero Group 2 (女忍かげろう組 <弐>) [TV movie] Female Ninja Kagero Group 3 (女忍かげろう組 <参>) [TV movie]	1990.04.07; 1990.09.26; 1991.12.28
Yoshiwara Hiren Shinobi no Onna (吉原悲恋 忍びの女) [TV movie]	1991.12.23
Goemon (五右衛門) [TV movie]	1994.01.08
Ninja Gaeshi Mizuno Shiro (忍者がえし水の城) [TV movie]	1996.04.30
Legend of the Devil (修羅之介斬魔剣 妖魔伝説)	1996.11.09
Samurai Fiction (SF サムライ・フィクション)	1998.08.01
Shinobi Shinobi: The Law of Shinobi (隠忍術) Shinobi 2: Runaway (隠忍術 弐) Shinobi 3: Hidden Techniques (隠忍術 参) Shinobi 4: A Way Outs (隠忍術 四 殺戮の終末)	2002.06.14; 2002.09.13; 2003.01.10; 2003.06.13
Azumi Azumi (あずみ) Azumi 2: Death or Love (あずみ2 Death of Love)	2003.05.10; 2005.03.12
Sarutobi Sasuke and the Army of Darkness Sarutobi Sasuke and the Army of Darkness: Heaven Chapter (猿飛佐助 闇の軍団 天の巻) Sarutobi Sasuke and the Army of Darkness 2: Earth Chapter (猿飛佐助 闇の軍団2 地の巻) Sarutobi Sasuke and the Army of Darkness 3: Wind Chapter (猿飛佐助 闇の軍団3 風の巻) Sarutobi Sasuke and the Army of Darkness 4: Fire Chapter (猿飛佐助 闇の軍団4 火の巻 完結篇)	2004.11.21; 2005.01.21; 2005.10.14; 2005.12.09
The Iga Revolt The Iga Revolt (天正 伊賀の乱) The Iga Revolt 2 (伊賀の乱 拘束) The Iga Revolt 3 (戦国 伊賀の乱)	2005.10; 2007; 2009.02.21
Kage (影) short film	2007
Ninja Killer (秘忍伝 NINJA KILLER)	2008
Geisha Assassin (芸者vs忍者)	2008.09.27
Goemon (五右衛門)	2009.05.01
Rogue Ninja (抜け忍) [aka Fugitive Ninja]	2009.08.28
Ninja Star (忍術伝 NINJA STAR)	2009.09.04
Kamui: The Lone Ninja (カムイ外伝)	2009.09.19
Evil Ninja (忍邪 NINJA)	2010.06.19
The Kunoichi: Ninja Girl (女忍 KUNOICHI)	2011.03.19
Nintama Rantarō Ninja Kids!!! (忍たま乱太郎) Ninja Kids: Summer Mission Impossible (忍たま乱太郎 夏休み宿題大作戦！の段)	2011.07.23; 2013.07.06
Shinobidō (忍道)	2012.02.04
Ninjani Sanjo! Mirai e no Tatakai (忍ジャニ参上! 未来への戦い)	2014.06.07
The Ninja War of Torakage (虎影)	2015.06.20
Yagyu Jubei's Social Reform Journey (柳生十兵衛 世直し旅)	2015.07.03
Ninja Cat (猫忍)	2017.05.20
Mumon: The Land of Stealth (忍びの国)	2017.07.01
Shinobe! Usaemon Shinobe! Usaemon (忍べ!右左エ門) [TV movie] Shinobe! Usaemon: The Sky Attack (忍べ!右左エ門 THE SKY ATTACK) [TV movie]	2018.12.19; 2019.12.26
Last Ninja Last Ninja: Red Shadow (下忍 赤い影) Last Ninja: Blue Shadow (下忍 青い影)	2019.10.04; 2019.11.15
Sakamoto's Ninja Universe BLACKFOX: Age of the Ninja SHOGUN'S NINJA -将軍乃忍者- NINJA WARS 〜BLACKFOX VS SHOGUN'S NINJA〜	2019.10.05; 2025.03.21; 2026.03.29

==== Ninpo-cho films ====
Films based on the Ninpō-chō novels by Futaro Yamada.
Title	Original story	Release Date
Edo Ninja Scroll: Seven Shadows (江戸忍法帖 七つの影)	Edo Ninpō-chō (江戸忍法帖) {1}	1963.05.19
Moonshadow Ninja Scroll: Twenty-One Eyes (月影忍法帖 二十一の眼)	Ninja Tsukikage-shō (忍者月影抄) {1}	1963.12.15
Women Ninjas (くノ一忍法)	Kunoichi Ninpō-chō (くノ一忍法帖) {1}	1964.10.03
The Spying Sorceress (くノ一化粧)	Gedō Ninpō-chō (外道忍法帖) {1}	1964.12.12
Ninja Chushingura (忍法忠臣蔵)	Ninpō Chūshingura (忍法忠臣蔵) {1}	1965.02.25
Homeless Ninja Scroll (風来忍法帖)	Fūrai Ninpō-chō (風来忍法帖) {1a}	1965.05.16
Homeless Ninja Scroll: Lose in All Directions (風来忍法帖 八方破れ)	Fūrai Ninpō-chō (風来忍法帖) {1b}	1968.05.08
Edo Ninja Scroll (江戸忍法帖) [TV series]	Edo Ninpō-chō (江戸忍法帖) {2}	1966.04.03
Ninja's Mark: The Secret of the Fylfot (忍びの卍)	Shinobi no Manji (忍びの卍)	1968.01.27
Samurai Reincarnation (魔界転生)	Makai Tenshō (魔界転生) {1}	1981.06.06
Ninja Wars (伊賀忍法帖)	Iga Ninpō-chō (伊賀忍法帖)	1982.12.18
Female Ninja Chushingura (くノ一忠臣蔵) [TV movie]	Ninpō Chūshingura (忍法忠臣蔵) {2}	1983.12.08
Female Ninjas Magic Chronicles 1: Protecting the Royal Embryo (くノ一忍法帖)	Kunoichi Ninpō-chō (くノ一忍法帖) {2}	1991.10.21
Female Ninjas Magic Chronicles 2: Secret of the Christian Bells (くノ一忍法帖II 聖少女の秘宝)	Gedō Ninpō-chō (外道忍法帖) {2}	1992.08.21
Female Ninjas Magic Chronicles 3: Sacred Book of Sexual Positions (くノ一忍法帖III 秘戯伝説の怪)	Higisho Sōdatsu (秘戯書争奪)	1993.05.21
Female Ninjas Magic Chronicles 4: Rebel Forces at the Threshold (くノ一忍法帖IV 忠臣蔵秘抄)	Ninpō Chūshingura (忍法忠臣蔵) {3}	1994.03.24
Female Ninjas Magic Chronicles 5: Secret Story of Jiraiya (くノ一忍法帖 自来也秘抄)	Jiraiya Ninpō-chō (自来也忍法帖)	1995.05.06
Lady Ninja: Reflections of Darkness (くノ一忍法帖 忍者月影抄)	Ninja Tsukikage-shō (忍者月影抄) {2}	1996.04.13
Reborn from Hell: Samurai Armageddon (魔界転生)	Makai Tenshō (魔界転生) {2a}	1996.04.26
Reborn from Hell II: Jubei's Revenge (魔界転生II)	Makai Tenshō (魔界転生) {2b}	1996.10.04
Ninja Resurrection: The Revenge of Jubei (魔界転生 地獄篇 第一歌) [OVA (Original video animation)]	Makai Tenshō (魔界転生) {3a}	1998.02.27
Ninja Resurrection: Hell's Spawn (魔界転生 地獄篇 第二歌) [OVA (Original video animation)]	Makai Tenshō (魔界転生) {3b}	1998.03.27
Lady Ninja (くノ一忍法帖 柳生外伝)	Yagyū Ninpō-chō (柳生忍法帖) {1}	1998.07.11
Female Ninjas Magic Chronicles: Legend of Yagyu Part 1 (くノ一忍法帖 柳生外伝 江戸花地獄篇)	Yagyū Ninpō-chō (柳生忍法帖) {2a}	1998.08.21
Female Ninjas Magic Chronicles: Legend of Yagyu Part 2 (くノ一忍法帖 柳生外伝 会津雪地獄篇)	Yagyū Ninpō-chō (柳生忍法帖) {2b}	1998.09.23
Samurai Resurrection (魔界転生)	Makai Tenshō (魔界転生) {4}	2003.04.26
Shinobi: Heart Under Blade	Kōga Ninpō-chō (甲賀忍法帖)	2005.09.17
Lady Ninja: Reflections of Darkness (くノ一忍法帖 影ノ月)	Ninja Tsukikage-shō (忍者月影抄) {3}	2011.06.04
Kunoichi Ninpocho Hotarubi (くノ一忍法帖 蛍火) [TV series]	Ninpō Sōtō no Washi (忍法双頭の鷲)	2018.04.03

==== Silent films ====
The first ninja movies were silent films.
Title	Release Date
Jiraiya Goketsu Monogatari (児雷也豪傑譚話)	1912.10.15
Jiraiya (児雷也)	1914.03.01
Jiraiya (児雷也)	1914.11
Jiraiya Osho (児雷也お照)	1914.11
Kaiso-Den (怪鼠伝)	1915.04.05
Sarutobi Sasuke (猿飛佐助)	1915.07
Kirigakure Saizo (霧隠才蔵)	1915.09
Jiraiya Goketsu-Den (自雷也豪傑伝)	1916.03
Ninjutsu Taro (忍術太郎)	1916.03
Hikitobi Tasuke (蟇飛大輔)	1916.07.15
Ninjutsu Sanyushi (忍術三勇士)	1916.09.01
Kaiketsu Ninjutsu Goro (快傑忍術五郎)	1916.09.30
Koga Umon (Ninjutsu Koga-Ryu) (甲賀右門（忍術甲賀流）)	1916.10.30
Kappa no Sarumaru (河童の猿丸)	1916.11
Onna Ninjutsu (女忍術)	1917.01.31
Nidaime Jiraiya (二代目児雷也)	1917.03.11
Ninjutsu Sannin Taro (忍術三人太郎)	1917.04.14
Ninjutsu Botan no Choji (忍術牡丹の長次)	1917.05.30
Ninjutsu Juyushi (忍術十勇士)	1917.07.14
Ninjutsu Gisuke (忍術義助)	1917.11.12
Shuhen Sarutobi Sasuke (終編猿飛佐助)	1918.03.01
Sumo Ninjutsu Dewagatake Yuzo (角力忍術出羽嶽勇蔵)	1918.04.14
Ninjutsu Kaiso Koga Saburo (忍術開祖甲賀三郎)	1918.05.12
Sarutobi Sasuke (猿飛佐助)	1918.05.26
Jiraiya Goketsu Monogatari (Jiraiya) (児雷也豪傑譚（自雷也）)	1918.10.31
Mito Komon Ninjutsu Yaburi (水戸黄門忍術破)	1918.10.31
Musume Jiraiya (娘児雷也)	1919
Sarutobi Sasuke (猿飛佐助)	1919.02.01
Okubo Hikozaemon to Ninjutsu-yatsu (大久保彦左衛門と忍術奴)	1919.06.01
Onna Sarutobi (女猿飛)	1919.08.31
Ninjutsu Tosuke (忍術藤助)	1919.09.14
Ninjutsu Amako Juyushi (尼子十勇士)	1919.10.31
Ninjutsu Shitenno (忍術四天王)	1919.12.29
Ninjutsu Koboshi (忍術小法師)	1920.01.25
Kirigakure Saizo to Iwami Jutaro (岩見重太郎と霧隠才蔵)	1920.04.01
Hotaiko Gozen Ninjutsu Kurabe (豊太公御前忍術競)	1920.07.14
Kirigakure to Sarutobi (霧隠と猿飛)	1920.07.28
Ninjutsu Sanyushi (忍術三勇士)	1920.10.10
Jiraiya (児雷也)	1920.10.20
Shonen Ninjutsu Haruwakamaru (少年忍術春若丸)	1920.10.28
Genkotsu to Ninjutsu no Manyu (拳骨と忍術の漫遊)	1920.10.31
Ninjutsu Sannin Musume (忍術三人娘)	1920.12.30
Sarutobi Sasuke Ninjutsu Dai Kessen (猿飛佐助忍術大決戦)	1920.12.31
Ninjutsu Goro (忍術五郎)	1921
Ninjutsu Meijin to Genjutsu Meijin (忍術名人と幻術名人)	1921
Ninjutsu-Shu Akashi (忍術種あかし)	1921
Genkotsu to Ninjutsu no Manyu Dai Ni-Hen (拳骨と忍術の漫遊 第二篇)	1921.01.10
Ninjutsu Jirai (忍術児雷)	1921.01.30
Goketsu Jiraiya (豪傑児雷也)	1921.02.01
Goto Matabei Ninjutsu Yaburi (後藤又兵衛忍術破り)	1921.03.01
Genkotsu to Ninjutsu no Manyu Dai San-Hen (拳骨と忍術の漫遊 第三篇)	1921.03.30
Sarutobi Genji (猿飛源次)	1921.04.21
Joso Ninjutsu (女装忍術)	1921.05.22
Ninjutsu Kitaguni Raitaro (忍術 北国雷太郎)	1921.07.08
Sanada Daisuke to Sarutobi Sasuke (真田大助と猿飛佐助)	1921.08.09
Ninjutsu Sarutobi Sasuke (忍術猿飛佐助)	1921.12.10
Ninjutsu Yasha (忍術夜叉)	1922
Jiraiya (児雷也)	1922.01.10
Shonen Jiraiya (少年児雷也)	1922.02.15
Ninjutsu Kyokaku Kirigakure Saiji (忍術侠客 霧隠才次)	1922.03.01
Joso Ninjutsu Konishi Teruwakamaru (女装忍術小西照若丸)	1922.03.30
Sarutobi Sasuke (猿飛佐助) <	1922.03.31
Ninjutsu Sanyushi (忍術三勇士)	1922.07.14
Sarutobi Sasuke (猿飛佐助)	1922.08.12
Ninjutsu Kirigaku Sen'emon (忍術霧隠千右衛門)	1922.09.07
Ninjutsu-Yaburi Maeda Inuchiyo (忍術破り 前田犬千代)	1922.10.01
Kirigakure Saizo (霧隠才蔵)	1922.12.23
Kirigakure Saizo (霧隠才蔵)	1922.12.31
Ninjutsu Kozo Daisuke (忍術小僧大助)	1923.01.11
Yokai Jiraiya (妖怪自来也)	1923.02.08
Ninjutsu Gokko (忍術ごっこ)	1923.04.01
Ninjutsu Juyushi (忍術十勇士)	1923.04.14
Sarutobi no Ninjutsu (猿飛の忍術)	1924.01.11
Genkotsu to Ninjutsu no Manyu (拳骨と忍術の漫遊)	1924.01.14
Sennin (仙人)	1924.10.01
Sarutobi Sasuke to Seikai Nyudo Zenpen (猿飛佐助と清海入道 前篇)	1926.01.15
Sarutobi Sasuke to Seikai Nyudo Chuhen (猿飛佐助と清海入道 中篇)	1926.02.28
Sarutobi Sasuke to Seikai Nyudo Shuhen (猿飛佐助と清海入道 終篇)	1926.03.23
Ninjutsu Ichiya Daimyo (忍術一夜大名)	1926.05.13
Jiraiya (児雷也)	1927.12.10
Ninjutsu Hizakuri-Ge Dai Ichi-Hen (忍術膝栗毛 第一篇)	1928.02.15
Ninjutsu Hizakuri-Ge Dai Ni-Hen (忍術膝栗毛 第二篇)	1928.02.22
Ninjutsu Hizakuri-Ge Dai San-Hen (忍術膝栗毛 第三篇)	1928.02.29
Shusse Ninjutsu Matsunosuke Sairai (出世忍術松之助再来)	1928.08.10
Sozoku Ninjutsu Banashi (鼠賊忍術噺)	1929.11.09
Ninjutsu Koshin Kyoku (忍術行進曲)	1930.05.08
Sarutobi Sasuke Renai Hen (猿飛佐助 恋愛篇)	1930.11.28
Ninjutsu Naniwa Angya (忍術浪速行脚)	1931.05.15
Sarutobi Sasuke Shokoku Tansa (猿飛佐助諸国探査)	1932.02.25
Sarutobi Sasuke (猿飛佐助)	1934.02.22
Kirigakure Ninjutsu Tabi (霧隠忍術旅)	1935.01.27
Gozonji Sarutobi Sasuke Zenpen (御存知猿飛佐助 前篇)	1935.07.11
Gozonji Sarutobi Sasuke Kohen (御存知猿飛佐助 後篇)	1935.08.08
Ninjutsu Sanada Juyushi (忍術真田十勇士)	1935.11.15
Ninjutsu Sanada Tasuke (忍術真田大助)	1936
Tenkamuso Kaiketsu Jiraiya Zenpen (天下無双怪傑児雷也 前篇)	1936.04.29
Tenkamuso Kaiketsu Jiraiya Kohen (天下無双怪傑児雷也 後篇)	1936.05.14
Ninjutsu Gozen Dai Shiai (忍術御前大試合)	1936.06.05
Ninjutsu Happyakuya-Tanuki (忍術八百八狸)	1937.01.09
Ninjutsu Shitenno (忍術四天王)	1937.01.31
Goketsu Ninjutsu Kurabe (豪傑忍術比べ)	1937.04.08
Ninjutsu Senjogatake (忍術戦場ケ岳)	1937.04.22
Ninjutsu Osaka Fuyu no Jin (忍術大阪冬の陣)	1937.04.29
Ninjutsu Momochi Sandayu (忍術百々地三太夫)	1937.12.15
Hatsusugata Ninjutsu Dochu Sugoroku (初姿忍術道中双六)	1937.12.31
Commentary Editions
Ninjutsu Sangakuto (忍術山嶽党)	1938
Ninjutsu Yaburi Arakawa Kumazo (忍術破り荒川熊蔵)	1938.01.10
Ninjutsu Tomoe Gassen (忍術巴合戦)	1938.06.09
Ninjutsu Torawakamaru (忍術虎若丸)	1938.10.13
Ninjutsu Dai Shingun (忍術大進軍)	1938.12.31
Ninjutsu Hachi Tengu Zenpen (忍術八天狗 前篇)	1939.02.01
Ninjutsu Hachi Tengu Kohen (忍術八天狗 後篇)	1939.02.08
Ninjutsu Satsuma Bikyaku (忍術薩摩飛脚)	1939.02.15
Ninjutsu Hyakuju Gassen Zenpen (忍術百獣合戦 前篇)	1939.03.15
Ninjutsuju Sandaiki (忍術十三代記)	1939.05.18
Daijayama Senjutsu Jiai (大蛇山仙術試合)	1939.06.08
Ninjutsu Saiyuki Zenpen (忍術西遊記 前篇)	1939.08.10
Ninjutsu Saiyuki Kohen (忍術西遊記 後篇)	1939.08.17
Joso Ninjutsu Iga-Ryu (女装忍術伊賀流)	1939.12.08
Ninjutsu Goyu-Den (忍術豪勇伝)	1939.12.14
Ninjutsu Kaikoku Sanyushi (忍術廻国三勇士)	1939.12.31

=== Gendai-geki films ===
Gendai-geki (現代劇), which literally means "modern drama", is a genre of film, television, and theater in Japan whose stories are contemporary dramas set in the modern world.
Title	Release Date
Black Tight Killers (俺にさわると危ないぜ)	1966.02.12
Modern Female Ninja: Flesh Hell (現代くノ一肉地獄)>	1968.10
Konto 55: I Am a Ninja's Great-Great Grandson (コント55号 俺は忍者の孫の孫) [based on the novel "Ninpō Sōden 73 (忍法相伝73)" by Futaro Yamada]	1969.10.10
The Executioner The Executioner (直撃！地獄拳) The Executioner II: Karate Inferno (直撃地獄拳 大逆転)	1974.08.10; 1974.12.28
The Shinobi Ninja (世仇忍者錠)	1981
Yakuza vs Ninja (はぐれ組VS忍者)	2012.10.24
Lady Ninja -A Blue Shadow- (LADY NINJA ～青い影～)	2018.01.20
Red Blade (レッド・ブレイド)	2018.12.15

=== Tokusatsu films ===
Tokusatsu (特撮), which literally means "special filming", is a Japanese term for live-action film or television drama that makes heavy use of special effects. Tokusatsu entertainment often deals with science fiction, fantasy or horror, but can also include kaiju, superhero, metal hero, mecha, and super sentai.
Title	Release Date
Phantom Agents (忍者部隊月光) [film based on the Phantom Agents TV series]	1964.07.28
Space Ninja: Swords of the Space Ark [film assembled from episodes of the Message from Space: Galactic Wars TV series]	1981
Kabamaru the Ninja (伊賀野カバ丸)	1983.08.06
Cyber Ninja (未来忍者)	1988.12.02
Zipang	1990.01.27
The Ninja Dragon (空想科学任侠伝 極道忍者ドス竜)	1990.10.25
Ninja Battle Ninja Battle: Negoro Ninpo vs Koga Ninpo (忍者バトル 根来忍法VS甲賀忍法) [TV Special Part 1] Ninja Battle: To Kill the Modern Bubble (忍者バトル バブルの現代を斬る) [TV Special Part 2]	1991; 1991
Female Neo Ninjas (ザ・忍者ウォリアーズ くノ一戦士)	1991.03.21
Ninja Sentai Kakuranger [films based on the Ninja Sentai Kakuranger TV series] Ninja Sentai Kakuranger (忍者戦隊カクレンジャー) [short film] Super Sentai World (スーパー戦隊ワールド) [short 3-D film] Superpower Task Force Ohranger: Ohranger vs Kakuranger (超力戦隊オーレンジャー オーレVSカクレンジャー) [direct-to-video film] Ninja Sentai Kakuranger: Act Three - Middle-Aged Struggles (忍者戦隊カクレンジャー 第三部・中年奮闘編) [web-exclusive special]	1994.04.16; 1994.08.06; 1996.03.08; 2024.08.04
Nine-One Nine-One: Female Ninja Supernatural Beast Legend (NINE－ONE くノ一妖獣伝説) Nine-One II: Demon Beast City (NINE－ONEII 魔獣都市)	1995.06.23; 1996.07.26
Sakuya: Slayer of Demons (さくや妖怪伝)	2000.08.12
Ninpū Sentai Hurricaneger [films based on the Ninpū Sentai Hurricaneger TV series] Ninpū Sentai Hurricanger: Shushutto the Movie (忍風戦隊ハリケンジャー シュシュッと THE MOVIE) Ninpū Sentai Hurricanger: Super Ninja and Super Kuroko (忍風戦隊ハリケンジャー スーパー忍者とスーパー黒子) [direct-to-video film] Ninpū Sentai Hurricanger vs. Gaoranger (忍風戦隊ハリケンジャーVSガオレンジャー) Bakuryū Sentai Abaranger vs. Hurricanger (爆竜戦隊アバレンジャーVSハリケンジャー) GoGo Sentai Boukenger vs. Super Sentai (轟轟戦隊ボウケンジャーVSスーパー戦隊) [direct-to-video film] Ninpuu Sentai Hurricanger: 10 Years After (忍風戦隊ハリケンジャー 10 YEARS AFTER) [direct-to-video film] Ninpu Sentai Hurricaneger With Donbrothers (忍風戦隊ハリケンジャーwithドンブラザーズ) [web-exclusive special]	2002.08.17; 2002.10; 2003.03.14; 2004.03.12; 2007.03.21; 2013.08.09; 2022.12.25
Nin x Nin: Ninja Hattori-kun, the Movie (NIN×NIN 忍者ハットリくん THE MOVIE)	2004.08.28
Future Ninja Girl Ryan Future Ninja Girl Ryan (未来女忍者ライアン) [direct-to-video film] Future Ninja Girl Ryan Sub Story: Secret Agent MINAKO (未来女忍者ライアン外伝 秘密捜査官 美奈子) [direct-to-video film] Future Ninja Girl Ryan Sub Story: Secret Agent NANA (未来女忍者ライアン外伝 秘密捜査官 NANA) [direct-to-video film]	2005.07.22; 2006.02.24; 2006.03.24
Chō Ninja Tai Inazuma! direct-to-video series Super Ninja Force Inazuma! (超忍者隊イナズマ) Super Ninja Force Inazuma! SPARK (超忍者隊イナズマ!!SPARK)	2006.06; 2007.07.21
Cool Dimension: Innocent Assassin (クール・ディメンション)	2006.10.14
Super Heroine U.S.A. Vampire Ninja Super Heroine U.S.A. Vampire Ninja -Dark Feather- (グラビアヒロインUSA VAMPIRE忍者 DARK FEATHER) [direct-to-video film] Super Heroine U.S.A. Vampire Ninja -Blood Fang- (グラビアヒロインUSA VAMPIRE忍者 BLOOD FANG) [direct-to-video film]	2006.12.22; 2007.01.12
Super Heroine U.S.A. Ninja Super Heroine U.S.A. Ninja - Rush Episode (グラビアヒロインUSA 忍者－奔ノ巻－) [direct-to-video film] Super Heroine U.S.A. Ninja - Tears Episode (グラビアヒロインUSA 忍者－泪ノ巻－) [direct-to-video film]	2007.04.27; 2007.05.11
Glory to the Filmmaker! (監督•ばんざい!)	2007.06.02
Heroine Super Fight!! - Female Ninja Mizuki (ヒロインスーパーファイト!!~女忍者ミズキ編～) [direct-to-video film]	2007.07.13
Kamen Rider Den-O: I'm Born! (劇場版 仮面ライダー電王 俺、誕生！)	2007.08.04
Ninja Special Agent Justy Wind Ninja Special Agent Justy Wind: Right Mind (忍者特捜ジャスティーウィンド RIGHT MIND) [direct-to-video film] Ninja Special Agent Justy Wind: Bad Copy (忍者特捜ジャスティーウィンド BAD COPY) [direct-to-video film] Super Heroine Violence - Justy Wind The Beginning (スーパーヒロインバイオレンス 忍者特捜ジャスティーウィンド外伝) [direct-to-video film] Ninja Special Agent Justy Wind vs. Evil American Comic Books Characters Vol 1 (忍者特捜 ジャスティーウィンドVS悪のアメコミヒロイン軍団 前編) [direct-to-video film] Ninja Special Agent Justy Wind vs. Evil American Comic Books Characters Vol 2 (忍者特捜 ジャスティーウィンドVS悪のアメコミヒロイン軍団 後編) [direct-to-video film] Ninja Special Agent Justy Wind NEO: Volume of Gerugesso (忍者特捜ジャスティーウィンドNEO ゲルゲッソーノ巻) [direct-to-video film] Ninja Special Agent Justy Wind NEO: Volume of Crowser (忍者特捜ジャスティーウィンドNEO クロウザーノ巻) [direct-to-video film] Armed Force Sairanger vs Ninja Special Agent Justy Wind (武捜戦隊サイレンジャーVS忍者特捜ジャスティーウィンド) [direct-to-video film] Ninja Special Agent Justy Wind 2014 So Long Mighty (バーニングアクション スーパーヒロイン列伝 忍者特捜ジャスティーウィンド2014 さらばマイティーウィンド) [direct-to-video film] Heroine Pinch Omnibus 11 Ninja Investigator Justy Laser (ヒロインピンチオムニバス11 忍者特捜ジャスティーイレイザー) [direct-to-video film] Ninja Special Agent Justy Wind Hunt! Five Women Villains Vol 1 (忍者特捜ジャスティーウィンド 追跡！5人の女ヴィランズ 前編) [direct-to-video film] Ninja Special Agent Justy Wind Hunt! Five Women Villains Vol 2 (忍者特捜ジャスティーウィンド 追跡！5人の女ヴィランズ 後編) [direct-to-video film]	2007.10.26; 2007.11.09; 2008.11.28; 2010.05.28; 2010.06.25; 2011.12.23; 2012.01.13; 2012.12.28; 2014.04.25; 2015.05.08; 2016.10.14; 2016.10.28
Female Ninja Warrior: Blue One (くノ一戦士 ブルーワン) [direct-to-video film]	2007.11.09
Ninja Whirlwind Onigiri (忍者旋風 ONIGIRI)	2008.04.30
The Machine Girl (片腕マシンガール)	2008.05.23
Sailor Ninja Sailor Ninja First Part (セーラー忍者 前編) [direct-to-video film] Sailor Ninja Last Part (セーラー忍者 後編) [direct-to-video film] Sailor Ninja vs Vampire First Part (セーラー忍者対吸血一族 前編) [direct-to-video film] Sailor Ninja vs. Vampire Last Part (セーラー忍者対吸血一族 後編) [direct-to-video film] Sailor Ninja - Time and Space First Part (セーラー忍者 時空戦遊録 前編) [direct-to-video film] Sailor Ninja - Time and Space Last Part (セーラー忍者 時空戦遊録 後編) [direct-to-video film] Sailor Ninja Force - Yuki Hana Evil Buster Story First Part (セーラー忍者フォース 雪花退魔伝 前編) [direct-to-video film] Sailor Ninja Force - Yuki Hana Evil Buster Story Last Part (セーラー忍者フォース 雪花退魔伝 後編) [direct-to-video film] Sexual Dynamite Heroine: Sailor Ninja (セクシャルダイナマイトヒロイン セーラー忍者) [direct-to-video film]	2008.07.11; 2008.07.25; 2008.08.08; 2008.08.22; 2008.10.10; 2008.10.24; 2008.10.24; 2008.11.14; 2016.03.11
Engine Sentai Go-onger: Boom Boom! Bang Bang! GekijōBang!! (炎神戦隊ゴーオンジャー BUNBUN！BANBAN！劇場BANG!!)	2008.08.09
SF Ninja Cyber Trip (SF忍者サイバートリップ) [direct-to-video film]	2008.10.24
Hyper Sexy Heroine Special Detective: Spiritual Ninja Hikaru (ハイパーセクシーヒロイン 特捜スピリチュアル忍者HIKARU) [direct-to-video film]	2009.01.23
RoboGeisha (ロボゲイシャ)	2009.10.03
Alien vs Ninja (AVNエイリアンVSニンジャ)	2010.07.03
Akiballion Shadow Akiballion Shadow Vol.1 (アキバリオン影 前編) [direct-to-video film] Akiballion Shadow Vol.2 (アキバリオン影 後編) [direct-to-video film]	2010.09.24; 2010.10.08
Burning Action Superheroine Chronicles: Evil Ninja Hunt Kurenai (バーニングアクション スーパーヒロイン列伝 魔忍狩り 紅) [direct-to-video film]	2012.11.09
Gatchaman (ガッチャマン) [live-action adaptation of the anime series Science Ninja Team Gatchaman]	2013.08.24
Time Destroyer Ninja "Ziraiya" (時空脱獄 NINJA ジライヤ)	2014.11.25
Shuriken Sentai Ninninger [films based on the Shuriken Sentai Ninninger TV series] Ressha Sentai ToQger vs. Kyoryuger: The Movie (烈車戦隊トッキュウジャーVSキョウリュウジャー) Super Hero Taisen GP: Kamen Rider 3 (スーパーヒーロー大戦GP 仮面ライダー3号) Shuriken Sentai Ninninger: Aka Ninger vs. Star Ninger Hundred Nin Battle! (手裏剣戦隊ニンニンジャー アカニンジャーVSスターニンジャー 百忍バトル! ) [special DVD short film] Shuriken Sentai Ninninger the Movie: The Dinosaur Lord's Splendid Ninja Scroll! (手裏剣戦隊ニンニンジャー THE MOVIE 恐竜殿さまアッパレ忍法帖！) Shuriken Sentai Ninninger vs. ToQger the Movie: Ninja in Wonderland (手裏剣戦隊ニンニンジャーVSトッキュウジャー THE MOVIE 忍者・イン・ワンダーランド) Come Back! Shuriken Sentai Ninninger: Ninnin Girls vs. Boys FINAL WARS (帰ってきた手裏剣戦隊ニンニンジャー ニンニンガールズVSボーイズ FINAL WARS) [direct-to-video film] Doubutsu Sentai Zyuohger vs. Ninninger the Movie: Super Sentai's Message from the Future (劇場版 動物戦隊ジュウオウジャーVSニンニンジャー 未来からのメッセージfromスーパー戦隊)	2015.01.17; 2015.03.21; 2015.07; 2015.08.08; 2016.01.23; 2016.06.22; 2017.01.14
Ninja the Monster	2015.08.02
Ninja vs Shark (妖獣奇譚 ニンジャVSシャーク)	2023.04.14

=== Anime films ===
Anime (アニメ) is hand-drawn and computer animation originating from or associated with Japan. The word anime is the Japanese term for animation, which means all forms of animated media. Note: For ninja non-lead appearances in anime films and OVA (Original video animation) series, see the Minor roles section below.
Title	Release Date
Ninja Boy Fireball Ninja Boy Fireball: An Episode in Edo (忍術火の玉小僧 江戸の巻) Ninja Boy Fireball: An Episode in Paper Drama (忍術火の玉小僧 紙芝居の巻)	1934.11.09; 1934.12.16
Young Sarutobi Sasuke (少年猿飛佐助)	1959.12.25
Band of Ninja (忍者武芸帳)	1967.02.15
Science Ninja Team Gatchaman: The Movie (科学忍者隊ガッチャマン)	1978.07.15
Ninja Hattori-kun Ninja Hattori-kun: Abracadabra Magic Picture Diary (忍者ハットリくん ニンニン忍法絵日記の巻) Ninja Hattori-kun: Abracadabra Hometown Battle Diary (忍者ハットリくん ニンニンふるさと大作戦の巻) Ninja Hattori-kun + Paaman: Psychic Wars (忍者ハットリくん+パーマン 超能力ウォーズ) Ninja Hattori-kun + Paaman: Ninja Monster Jippo vs Mirakuru-Egg (忍者ハットリくん+パーマン 忍者怪獣ジッポウvsミラクル卵)	1982.03.13; 1983.03.12; 1984.03.17; 1985.03.16
The Dagger of Kamui (カムイの剣)	1985.03.09
Yōtōden [OVA mini-series also re-edited into the feature film Wrath of the Ninja] Chronicle of the Warlord Period Yotoden I: Break Out (戦国奇譚妖刀伝 -破獄の章-) Chronicle of the Warlord Period Yotoden II: Demon's Cry (戦国奇譚妖刀伝 -奇哭の章-) Chronicle of the Warlord Period Yotoden III: Flames of Anger (戦国奇譚妖刀伝 -炎情の章-)	1987.05.21; 1987.12.18; 1988.11.05
The Plot of the Fuma Clan (ルパン三世 風魔一族の陰謀)	1987.12.26
Blood Reign: Curse of the Yoma (妖魔) [short drama/mythology OVA series set in feudal Japan] Blood Reign: Curse of the Yoma Episode 1 Hikage in an Evil World (妖魔 上の巻 緋影魔境編) Blood Reign: Curse of the Yoma Episode 2 Maoru with Crazy Fang (妖魔 下の巻 魔狼兇牙編)	1989.04.15; 1989.04.15
Sword for Truth (修羅之介斬魔剣 死鎌紋の男)	1990.12.28
Ninja Ryukenden (忍者龍剣伝) [OVA film based on the Ninja Gaiden video game series]	1991.11.21
La Blue Girl [several OVA hentai miniseries] La Blue Girl 1 (淫獣学園 La☆BlueGirl) La Blue Girl 2 (淫獣学園2 La☆BlueGirl) La Blue Girl 3 (淫獣学園3 La☆BlueGirl 色魔殺界の章) La Blue Girl 4 (淫獣学園4 La☆BlueGirl 妖刀淫界の章) La Blue Girl 5 (真・淫獣学園 La☆BlueGirl) La Blue Girl 6 Part 1 (真・淫獣学園2 La☆BlueGirl 前篇) La Blue Girl 6 Part 2 (真・淫獣学園2 La☆BlueGirl 後編) Lady Blue Episode 1 The First Love of the Shikima (淫獣学園EX La☆BlueGirl 初恋裏色魔篇) Lady Blue Episode 2 The Curse of the Mysterious Love (淫獣学園EX2 La☆BlueGirl 妖恋呪縛篇) Lady Blue Episode 3 The Hell of the Cursed Love (淫獣学園EX3 La☆BlueGirl 邪恋地獄篇) Lady Blue Episode 4 The Reincarnation of Sad Love (淫獣学園EX4 La☆BlueGirl 哀恋輪廻篇) La Blue Girl Returns: Demon Seed 1 (淫獣学園 La☆Blue Girl 復活篇 第一章) La Blue Girl Returns: Demon Seed 2 (淫獣学園 La☆Blue Girl 復活篇 第二章) La Blue Girl Returns: Shikima Lust1 (淫獣学園 La☆Blue Girl 復活篇 第三章) La Blue Girl Returns: Shikima Lust2 (淫獣学園 La☆Blue Girl 復活篇 第四章)	1992.06.26; 1992.12.11; 1993.06.05; 1993.07.09; 1994.01.28; 1994.02.25; 1994.03.25; 1996.07.26; 1996.08.23; 1996.10.11; 1996.11.08; 2001.05.25; 2001.08.25; 2002.01.25; 2002.05.25
Raven Tengu Kabuto: The Golden-Eyed Beast (鴉天狗カブト 黄金の目のケモノ)	1992.07.24
Bastard!! [OVA] Bastard!! Episode 1 Resurrection of the Warlock (BASTARD!! 暗黒の破壊神 第1話 爆炎の魔術師) Bastard!! Episode 2 Efreet the Fire Elemental (BASTARD!! 暗黒の破壊神 第2話 火炎魔神イーフリート) Bastard!! Episode 3 Ninja Master Gara (BASTARD!! 暗黒の破壊神 第3話 ニンジャマスター・ガラ) Bastard!! Episode 4 The Immortal King Di-Amon (BASTARD!! 暗黒の破壊神 第4話 不死王 ダイ・アモン) Bastard!! Episode 5 Thunder Empress Arshes Nei (BASTARD!! 暗黒の破壊神 第5話 雷帝アーシェス・ネイ) Bastard!! Episode 6 The Return of Dark Schneider (BASTARD!! 暗黒の破壊神 第6話 復活のダーク・シュナイダー)	1992.08.25; 1992.10.25; 1992.12.10; 1993.02.25; 1993.04.25; 1993.06.25
Black Lion (時元戦国史 黒の獅士 陣内篇)	1992.11.21
Fatal Fury Fatal Fury: Legend of the Hungry Wolf (バトルファイターズ 餓狼伝説) [TV movie special] Fatal Fury 2: The New Battle (バトルファイターズ 餓狼伝説2) [TV movie special] Fatal Fury: The Motion Picture (餓狼伝説 THE MOTION PICTURE)	1992.12.23; 1993.07.31; 1994.07.16
Ninja Scroll (獣兵衛忍風帖) [loosely based on the works of Futaro Yamada]	1993.06.05
Gatchaman [OVA] Gatchaman Episode 1: The Dragon King (GATCHAMAN 第1話 ガッチャマンVSタートルキング) Gatchaman Episode 2: The Red Specter (GATCHAMAN 第2話 謎のレッドインパルス) Gatchaman Episode 3: The Final Countdown (GATCHAMAN 第3話 ファイナルカウント0002)	1994.10.01; 1995.01.01; 1995.04.01
Ninja Cadets [short OVA comedy series about a group of ninja-in-training in feudal Japan] Ninja Cadets Episode 1 (Ninja者～上の巻) Ninja Cadets Episode 2 (Ninja者～下の巻)	1996.03.27; 1996.06.12
Mutant Turtles: Superman Legend [OVA based on the Teenage Mutant Ninja Turtles] Mutant Turtles: Superman Legend: The Great Crisis of the Super Turtles! The Saint Appears! (ミュータントタートルズ超人伝説編 スーパータートルズ大ピンチ！セイント登場!) [OVA] Mutant Turtles: Superman Legend: The Coming of the Guardian Beasts, The Metal Turtles Appears! (ミュータントタートルズ超人伝説編 守護獣降臨 メタルタートルズ登場!) [OVA]	1996.05.21; 1996.05.21
Nintama Rantarō [films based on the anime TV series] Nintama Rantarō: The Movie (映画 忍たま乱太郎) Nintama Rantarō: Ninjutsu Academy All Dispatched! (劇場版アニメ 忍たま乱太郎 忍術学園 全員出動!の段)	1996.06.29; 2011.03.12
Karakuri Ninja Girl [OVA hentai] Karakuri Ninja Girl 1 (忍法乱れからくり) Karakuri Ninja Girl 2 (忍法乱れからくり 其の二～くノ一逆襲 密地獄)	1996.08.23; 1996.11.29
Labyrinth of Flames [OVA] Labyrinth of Flame Episode 1: Samurai Labyrinth? Lovebyrinth? (炎のらびりんす 第1話 ちょんまげ らびりんす? らぶりんす?) Labyrinth of Flame Episode 2: Treasure Labyrinth? Loverinth? (炎のらびりんす 第2話 おたから らびりんす? らぶりんす?)	2000.09.25; 2000.12.21
Blood Shadow [OVA hentai] Blood Shadow Episode 1: Demon (紅蓮 第一幕 鬼) Blood Shadow Episode 2: Darkness (紅蓮 第二幕 闇) Blood Shadow Episode 3: Flames (紅蓮 第三幕 炎)	2001.09.07; 2001.12.28; 2002.03.29
Angel Blade [OVA] Angel Blade Act 1: The Call of the Goddess (エンジェルブレイド ACT.1「女神降臨」) Angel Blade Act 2: The Goddess Awakens (エンジェルブレイド ACT.2「女神覚醒」) Angel Blade Act 3: Goddess Rising to Heaven (エンジェルブレイド ACT.3「女神天昇」) Angel Blade Punish! Act 1 (エンジェルブレイド パニッシュ! ACT.1) Angel Blade Punish! Act 2 (エンジェルブレイド パニッシュ! ACT.2) Angel Blade Punish! Act 3 (エンジェルブレイド パニッシュ! ACT.3)	2001.12.14; 2002.07.05; 2003.04.11; 2004.12.29; 2005.05.13; 2005.09.09
Ninja Girls: Boob Empire Counterattack (NINJA GIRLS ～おっぱい帝国の逆襲～)	2002
The Last Kunoichi [OVA] The Last Kunoichi Part 1 (くノ一幕末奇譚 〜巻の壱〜) The Last Kunoichi Part 2 (くノ一幕末奇譚 〜巻の弐〜)	2003.12.25; 2004.05.25
Shadow [OVA hentai also known as Hyper Shinobi Animation: Shadow] Shadow Episode 1 Rule of the Dark (影Shadow 其ノ壱 闇の掟) Shadow Episode 2 Animal Road (影Shadow 其ノ弐 獣道) Shadow Episode 3 Runaway Ninja (影Shadow 其ノ叁 抜け忍) Shadow Episode 4 Vicissitudes (影Shadow 其ノ四 流転)	2004.03.26; 2004.06.25; 2004.09.24; 2004.12.24
Samurai XXX [OVA hentai] Samurai XXX Episode 1 (妖香の剣 壱の巻) Samurai XXX Episode 2 (妖香の剣 弐の巻)	2004.05.28; 2004.07.23
Naruto Naruto the Movie: Ninja Clash in the Land of Snow (劇場版 NARUTO 大活劇! 雪姫忍法帖だってばよ!!) Naruto the Movie: Legend of the Stone of Gelel (劇場版 NARUTO -ナルト- 大激突!幻の地底遺跡だってばよ) Naruto the Movie: Guardians of the Crescent Moon Kingdom (劇場版 NARUTO -ナルト- 大興奮!みかづき島のアニマル騒動だってばよ) Naruto Shippuden the Movie (劇場版 NARUTO -ナルト- 疾風伝) Naruto Shippuden the Movie: Bonds (劇場版 NARUTO -ナルト- 疾風伝 絆) Naruto Shippuden the Movie: The Will of Fire (劇場版 NARUTO -ナルト- 疾風伝 火の意志を継ぐ者) Naruto Shippuden the Movie: The Lost Tower (劇場版 NARUTO -ナルト- 疾風伝 ザ・ロストタワー) Naruto the Movie: Blood Prison (劇場版 NARUTO -ナルト- ブラッド・プリズン) Road to Ninja: Naruto the Movie (ROAD TO NINJA -NARUTO THE MOVIE-)	2004.08.21; 2005.08.06; 2006.08.05; 2007.08.04; 2008.08.02; 2009.08.01; 2010.07.31; 2011.07.30; 2012.07.28
Hininden Gausu (緋忍伝 呀宇種) [OVA hentai]	2005.12.22
Taimanin / Makai Kishi Ingrid [OVA hentai adaptations of the Taimanin video game series] Taimanin Asagi Vol. 01 (対魔忍アサギ Vol.01 逆襲の朧) Taimanin Asagi Vol. 02 (対魔忍アサギ Vol.02 姦獄のアリーナ) Taimanin Asagi Vol. 03 (対魔忍アサギ Vol.03 姉妹、相打つ！) Taimanin Asagi Vol. 04 (対魔忍アサギ Vol.04 闇に舞うくノ一) Makai Kishi Ingrid Episode 01 (魔界騎士イングリッド Episode 01 イングリッド無残) Makai Kishi Ingrid Episode 02 (魔界騎士イングリッド Episode 02 ムラサキ被虐) Makai Kishi Ingrid Episode 03 (魔界騎士イングリッド Episode 03 屈辱の誓約) Makai Kishi Ingrid Episode 04 (魔界騎士イングリッド Episode 04 惨めなる果て)	2007.02.24; 2007.08.11; 2008.08.23; 2009.05.01; 2009.06.20; 2009.09.10; 2010.03.27; 2010.08.27
Tsubasa: Reservoir Chronicle [several OVA series] Tsubasa Tokyo Revelations: The Magician's Message (ツバサ TOKYO REVELATIONS 魔術師の伝言) Tsubasa Tokyo Revelations: The Boy's Right Eye (ツバサ TOKYO REVELATIONS 少年の右目) Tsubasa Tokyo Revelations: The Dream that the Princess Saw (ツバサ TOKYO REVELATIONS 姫君の視た) Tsubasa Spring Thunder Chronicle: The First Part (ツバサ春雷記 -前編-) Tsubasa Spring Thunder Chronicle: The Latter Part (ツバサ春雷記 -後編-)	2007.11.06; 2008.01.17; 2008.03.17; 2009.03.17; 2009.05.15
Batman Ninja Batman Ninja (ニンジャバットマン) Batman Ninja vs. Yakuza League (ニンジャバットマン対ヤクザリーグ)	2018.04.28; 2025.03.18
Blackfox	2019.10.05

=== Erotic films ===
There are numerous softcore ninja films (in addition to innumerable hardcore-pornographic costume movies, often featuring BDSM motives).
Title	Release Date
Bohachi Bushido: Code of the Forgotten Eight (ポルノ時代劇 忘八武士道)	1973.02.03
Female Ninja Magic: 100 Trampled Flowers (くノ一淫法 百花卍がらみ)	1974.08.03
Female Ninjas: In Bed with the Enemy (くの一忍法 観音開き)	1976.02.14
Sexy Timetrip Ninjas (痴漢電車 極秘本番)	1984.08
La Blue Girl La Blue Girl Vol. 1 Revenge of the Sex Demon King (実写版 淫獣学園 色魔界の逆襲) La Blue Girl Vol. 3 Lady Ninja (淫獣学園3 くノ一狩り)	1995.02.24; 1996.02.24; 1996.02.24
Woman Ninja (女忍 密壷に秘められた淫術)	1995.08.25
Kunoichi: Deadly Mirage (幻魔殺法帖 新選組秘抄)	1997.03.14
Female Ninja Legend: Sailor Suit Ninpo-cho (くノ一外伝 セーラー服忍法帖)	1997.04.26
Ninja Vixens Ninja Vixens 1: Crimson Blades (くノ一忍法伝 紅の刃 女淫恋獄抄) Ninja Vixens 2 (くノ一忍法伝 封印の掟 ～女淫愛残抄～) Ninja Vixens 3: Forbidden Paradise (くノ一忍法伝 外伝 ～忍妖女～) Ninja Vixens 4 (くノ一忍法伝 魔物の館 ～女淫兄妹抄～) Ninja Vixens 5: Flame of Seduction (くノ一忍法伝 華艶淫火 ～女淫血風抄～) Ninja Vixens 6: Devilish Angels (くノ一忍法伝 天使と悪魔 ～女淫哀涙抄～) Ninja Vixens 7: Vixen Dropouts (くノ一忍法伝 巫女道隠密修行 ～女淫情艶抄～) Ninja Vixens 8: Web of Passion (くノ一忍法伝 妖獣雷光 ～女陰薄愛抄～) Ninja Vixens 9: Treacherous Beast (くノ一忍法伝 からくり遊戯 ～艶蜜快楽抄～) Shin Kunoichi Ninpo-Den: Gokujo Ryoran (新くノ一忍法伝 極女繚乱) Shin Kunoichi Ninpo-Den: Kindan no Rensa (新くノ一忍法伝 禁断の恋鎖) Shin Kunoichi Ninpo-Den: Shakunetsu no Ranbu (新くノ一忍法伝 灼熱の乱舞)	2000.09.22; 2001.06.22; 2001.10.26; 2001.12.21; 2002.04.26; 2002.06.21; 2002.10.25; 2003.02.25; 2003.07.25; 2004.01.23; 2004.04.01; 2004.07.01
Hotaru Ninja Girl (HOTARU くノ一忍叫伝)	2001.04.25
Legend of Hattori Hanzo III: Ninja Lust (三代目服部半蔵外伝 忍法欲色狂)	2002.04.24
Nagare Kunoichi Densetsu Nagare Kunoichi Densetsu: Amakusa Shiro Ibun Maken no Oyu (流れくノ一伝説 天草四郎異聞 魔剣のお夕) Nagare Kunoichi Densetsu: Dokuganryu Hidan Oshiroi Bori no Onna (流れくノ一伝説 独眼流秘譚 白粉彫りの女)	2003.02.28; 2003.02.28
Ninja Pussy Cat (好色くノ一 愛液責め)	2003.10.31
Kunoichi Inpo: Oppiroge Sakuragai (くノ一淫法 おっぴろげ桜貝)	2004.10.10
Onmitsu Kunoichi Ninpo-cho: Gaki Shimai (隠密くノ一忍法帳 餓鬼姉妹)	2005.01.24
The Flying Woman Ninja (空飛ぶ女くノ一)	2005.05.20
Seven Female Ninjas: Female Demon (七人のくノ一 鬼夜叉)	2005.05.24
Lady Ninja Kasumi Lady Ninja Kasumi Vol. 1 (真田くノ一忍法伝 かすみ) Lady Ninja Kasumi Vol. 2: Love & Betrayal (真田くノ一忍法伝 かすみ 愛と裏切りの絆) Lady Ninja Kasumi Vol. 3: Secret Skills (真田くノ一忍法伝 かすみ 武蔵！奥義開眼) Lady Ninja Kasumi Vol. 4: Birth Of A Ninja (真田くノ一忍法伝 かすみ 誕生！猿飛佐助) Lady Ninja Kasumi Vol. 5: Counter Attack (真田くノ一忍法伝 かすみ 服部半蔵の逆襲!!) Lady Ninja Kasumi Vol. 6 (真田くノ一忍法伝 かすみ 少女戦国史) Lady Ninja Kasumi Vol. 7 (真田くノ一忍法伝 かすみ 内乱！幸村暗殺!!) Lady Ninja Kasumi Vol. 8 (真田くノ一忍法伝 かすみ 因習の村を斬れ!!) Lady Ninja Kasumi Vol. 9 (真田くノ一忍法伝 かすみ 激突！はぐれ甲賀軍団!!) Lady Ninja Kasumi Vol. 10 (真田くノ一忍法伝 かすみ 少女秘戯伝説)	2005.09.22; 2006.03.23; 2006.10.24; 2007.09.21; 2008.03.24; 2008.06.23; 2008.10.22; 2009.04.03; 2009.09.04; 2010.05.07
Kunoichi Gonin Shu vs Onna Doragon Gundan (くノ一五人衆VS女ドラゴン軍団)	2005.10.25
Ninja Girls Ninja She-Devil (妖艶くノ一伝 ～鍔女篇～) Ninjaken: The Naked Sword (妖艶くノ一伝 ～紫雨篇～) Twin Blades of the Ninja (妖艶くノ一伝 ～矢魔女編～) Ninja Girl Aome (妖艶くノ一伝 ～蒼瞳篇～)	2006.10.25; 2007.06.25; 2007.10.25; 2007.11.25
Lady Ninja Kaede Lady Ninja Kaede (くノ一妖艶伝 楓) Lady Ninja Kaede 2 (くノ一妖艶伝 楓 傀儡魔羅の秘密)	2007.06.22; 2008.01.24
Memoirs of a Lady Ninja Memoirs of a Lady Ninja (隠密くノ一列伝 秘められた女忍び巻) Memoirs of a Lady Ninja 2 (隠密くノ一列伝 敵中突破！伊賀女忍者)	2009.07.24; 2009.08.25
Sultry Assassin Sultry Assassin: The Aphrodisiac Kill (艶剣客 くの一媚薬責め) Sultry Assassin 2: Ninja Brainwash (艶剣客 2 くノ一・色洗脳)	2010.11.23; 2011.08.05
Kunoichi Shokei-nin: Gōmon Jigoku Tabi (くノ一処刑人～拷問地獄旅～)	2012.06.20
Takeda Kunoichi Ninpō-den: Chiyome (武田くノ一忍法伝 千代女)	2015.10.02
Akechi Kunoichi Ninpō Gaiden (AKECHIくノ一忍法外伝)	2016.02.05

== American cinema ==
=== Action films ===
Action film is a film genre in which the protagonist or protagonists are thrust into a series of events that typically include violence, extended fighting, physical feats, and frantic chases.
Title	Country	Language	Release Date
The Killer Elite	United States	English / Mandarin	1975.12.17
The Octagon	United States	English	1980.08.14
The Ninja Trilogy anthology series Enter the Ninja Revenge of the Ninja Ninja III: The Domination	United States; United States; United States	English; English; English / Japanese	1981.10.02; 1983.09.07; 1984.09.14
The Last Ninja [TV movie pilot (unrelated to the video game series)]	United States	English	1983.07.07
The Master Ninja [series of home video movies edited from episodes of The Master TV series]	United States	English	1985
9 Deaths of the Ninja	United States	English	1985.04.26
American Ninja American Ninja American Ninja 2: The Confrontation American Ninja 3: Blood Hunt American Ninja 4: The Annihilation American Ninja V	United States; United States / South Africa; United States / South Africa; United States / South Africa; United States	English; English; English; English; English	1985.08.30; 1987.05.01; 1989.02.24; 1990.10.30; 1993.04.02
Pray for Death	United States	English / Japanese	1985.11
Duncan Jax Unmasking the Idol The Order of the Black Eagle	United States; United States	English; English	1986.11.17; 1987.12
Rage of Honor	United States / Argentina	English	1987.02
Sakura Ninja Sakura Killers White Phantom	United States / Taiwan; United States	English; English / Mandarin	1987.03.12; 1987.09.01
Bloodsport	United States	English	1988.02.26
Force of the Ninja	United States / Japan	English / Japanese	1988.03
Silent Assassins	United States	English	1988.05.18
Ninja Vengeance	United States	English	1988
For Hire [aka Lethal Ninja]	United States	English	1991
Lethal Ninja [aka American Ninja 5: The Nostradamus Syndrome]	United States / South Africa	English	1992.05.08
Raven: Return of the Black Dragons [original uncut TV movie pilot for Raven TV series]	United States	English	1992
Extralarge: Ninja Shadow [TV movie]	United States / Italy	English / Spanish	1993
Immortal Combat	United States / Mexico	English / Japanese	1994.05.07
Red Sun Rising	United States	English / Japanese	1994.09.01
The Hunted	United States / Japan	English / Japanese	1995.02.24
The Dangerous	United States	English	1995.07.11
Mask of the Ninja [TV movie]	United States	English / Japanese	2008.08.04
Ninja Ninja Ninja: Shadow of a Tear	United States; United States / Thailand	English / Japanese / Russian / Spanish; English / Japanese	2009.10.22; 2013.12.31
Ninja Assassin	United States	English	2009.11.25

=== Speculative fiction films ===
Speculative fiction is an umbrella genre encompassing fiction with certain elements that do not exist in the real world, often in the context of supernatural, futuristic or other imaginative themes. This includes, but is not limited to, science fiction, fantasy, superhero fiction, horror, utopian and dystopian fiction, fairytale fantasy, supernatural fiction as well as combinations thereof (e.g. science fantasy).
Title	Country	Language	Release Date
Eliminators	United States / Spain	English	1986.01.31
The Punisher	United States	English	1989.10.05
Teenage Mutant Ninja Turtles Teenage Mutant Ninja Turtles Teenage Mutant Ninja Turtles II: The Secret of the Ooze Teenage Mutant Ninja Turtles III TMNT [CGI animated film] Turtles Forever [animated TV movie] Teenage Mutant Ninja Turtles Teenage Mutant Ninja Turtles: Out of the Shadows Batman vs. Teenage Mutant Ninja Turtles [animated film] Rise of the Teenage Mutant Ninja Turtles: The Movie [animated TV movie] Teenage Mutant Ninja Turtles: Mutant Mayhem [animated film]	United States / Hong Kong; United States / Hong Kong; United States / Hong Kong; United States / Hong Kong; United States; United States; United States; United States; United States; United States	English / French; English; English; English; English; English; English; English; English; English	1990.03.30; 1991.03.22; 1993.03.19; 2007.03.23; 2009.11.21; 2014.08.08; 2016.06.03; 2019.05.14; 2022.08.05; 2023.08.02
RoboCop 3	United States	English	1993.04.18
Mighty Morphin Power Rangers: The Movie	United States	English	1995.06.30
Mortal Kombat [based on the Midway Games fighting video game series] Mortal Kombat Mortal Kombat: The Journey Begins [animated prequel film] Mortal Kombat Annihilation Mortal Kombat: Rebirth [web short film] Mortal Kombat: Legacy [web series] Mortal Kombat Legends: Scorpion's Revenge [animated film] Mortal Kombat [reboot film] Mortal Kombat Legends: Battle of the Realms [animated film] Mortal Kombat Legends: Snow Blind [animated film] Mortal Kombat II	United States; United States; United States; United States; United States; United States; United States / Australia; United States; United States; United States	English; English; English; English; English / Japanese; English; English; English; English; English	1995.08.18; 1995.08.29; 1997.12.21; 2010.06.08; 2011.04.11; 2020.04.14; 2021.04.08; 2021.08.31; 2022.10.09; 2026.05.08
Shadow Fury	United States / Japan	English	2001.10.30
Battle of the Planets: The Movie [animated compilation TV movie pilot]	United States	English	2002
The Black Ninja	United States	English	2003.01.14
Secret War	United States	English	2003.01.24
Daredevil and Elektra Daredevil Elektra	United States; United States / Canada	English; English	2003.02.14; 2005.01.14
G.I. Joe G.I. Joe: Spy Troops [direct-to-video CGI animated movie] G.I. Joe: Valor vs. Venom [direct-to-video CGI animated movie] G.I. Joe: Ninja Battles [direct-to-video CGI animated movie] G.I. Joe: The Rise of Cobra G.I. Joe: Retaliation Snake Eyes: G.I. Joe Origins	United States; United States; United States; United States; United States; United States	English; English; English; English; English; English	2003.08.27; 2004.09.14; 2004.09.15; 2009.08.07; 2012.06.29; 2021.07.23
Sin City Sin City Sin City: A Dame to Kill For	United States; United States	English; English	2005.04.01; 2014.08.22
Batman and Robin Batman Begins Teen Titans: Trouble in Tokyo [animated TV movie] Son of Batman [animated film]	United States / UK; United States; United States	English; English; English	2005.06.15; 2006.09.15; 2014.04.22
DOA: Dead or Alive [based on the Tecmo/Team Ninja fighting game series]	United States / Germany / UK	English	2006.09.07
Ninjas vs. Ninjas vs. Zombies Ninjas vs. Vampires Ninjas vs. Monsters	United States; United States; United States	English; English; English	2008.10.31; 2010.10.29; 2012.10.14
Dragonball Evolution [based on the Japanese Dragon Ball manga]	United States / Hong Kong / UK	English / Japanese / Hindi	2009.04.10
The King of Fighters [based on SNK's The King of Fighters series of fighting games]	United States / Taiwan / Japan / Canada	English	2010.08.26
The Wolverine	United States / UK	English / Japanese	2013.07.26
Ninja Apocalypse	United States	English	2014.08.05
The VelociPastor	United States	English	2017.11.02
Ninjas Down the Street (De Piraten van Hiernaast 2: De Ninja's van de Overkant)	Netherlands	Dutch	2022.04.20

=== Parody films ===
A parody film is a subgenre of comedy film that parodies other film genres or films as pastiches, works created by imitation of the style of many different films reassembled together. A parody; also called a spoof, send-up, take-off, lampoon, play on (something), caricature, or joke, is a work created to imitate, make fun of, or comment on an original work—its subject, author, style, or some other target—by means of satiric or ironic imitation.
Title	Country	Language	Release Date
Ninja Busters	United States	English	1984
Ninja Academy	United States	English	1989.08.17
9 1/2 Ninjas!	United States	English	1991.01.24
3 Ninjas 3 Ninjas 3 Ninjas Kick Back 3 Ninjas Knuckle Up 3 Ninjas: High Noon at Mega Mountain	United States; United States; United States	English; English; English	1992.08.07; 1994.05.01; 1995.04.07; 1998.04.10
3 Little Ninjas and the Lost Treasure	United States	English	1993.03.24
Surf Ninjas	United States	English	1993.08.20
Pocket Ninjas	United States	English	1997.06.20
Beverly Hills Ninja Beverly Hills Ninja Dancing Ninja	United States; United States / Canada / South Korea	English / Japanese; English	1997.01.17; 2010
Cheerleader Ninjas	United States	English	2002.06.14
Death to the Supermodels	United States	English	2005.11.29
Ninja Cheerleaders	United States	English	2008.05.10
The Art of Pain	United States	English	2008.07
The Lego Ninjago Movie [3D computer-animated film]	United States / Denmark	English	2017.09.22

== Asian cinema ==
=== Chinese films ===
==== Wuxia films ====
Wuxia (武俠), which literally means "martial heroes", is a genre of Chinese fiction concerning the adventures of martial artists in ancient China. In the case of Wuxia films featuring ninja, they also sometimes take place partially in Japan prior to, during, or shortly after the Edo period of Japanese history, from 1603 to 1868.
Title	Country	Language	Release Date
Ninja in the Deadly Trap (術士神傳)	Taiwan	Mandarin	1981.03.05
Return of the Deadly Blade (飛刀・又見飛刀) [aka Shaolin Fighters vs. Ninja]	Hong Kong	Cantonese	1981.04.02
Five Element Ninjas (五遁忍術)	Hong Kong	Cantonese	1982.04.21
Ninja in the Dragon's Den (龍之忍者)	Hong Kong	Cantonese / Japanese	1982.06.24
Duel to the Death (生死決)	Hong Kong	Cantonese	1983.01.13
Shaolin vs. Ninja (少林與忍者)	Taiwan	Mandarin	1983
Ninja Hunter (忍者大決鬥)	Taiwan	Mandarin	1984
Ninja vs. Shaolin Guards (武儈)	Taiwan	Mandarin	1984
Ninjas & Dragons (忍者潛龍)	China / Japan	Mandarin / Japanese	1984
Ninja: The Final Duel (忍者決戦少林 忍者在中國) [also re-dubbed as Shaolin Dolemite]	Taiwan	Mandarin	1986
Young Swordsmen in China (神州小劍俠)	China / Japan	Mandarin / Japanese	1989
Ninja in Ancient China (神通)	China	Mandarin	1993
Ninja Kids (忍者兵) [chinese version of Nintama Rantarō]	Taiwan	Mandarin	1997
A Man Called Hero (中華英雄)	Hong Kong	Cantonese	1999.07.17
Chinese Heroes (中華丈夫) [aka Ninja Clan Revenge]	Hong Kong	Cantonese	2001
The Prequel Of Gold Convoyers: A Beaconfire in Liaodong (鏢行天下前傳之烽火遼東)	China	Cantonese	2010.07.19
Doctor Monkey-Ninja's Ambition (铁猴子传奇之浪客野心)	China	Cantonese	2015

==== Wushu films ====
Wushu (武術), which literally means "martial arts" in both Chinese and Japanese (where 武術 is read as Bujutsu), is an umbrella term for the several hundred fighting styles that have developed over the centuries in China. In the case of Wushu films featuring ninja, it also encompasses the Japanese martial arts (Bujutsu) meaning and refers to martial arts films, chop socky films, and kung fu films produced by companies from Hong Kong, Taiwan, and China, whose stories are contemporary dramas set in the modern world.
Title	Country	Language	Release Date
Heroes of the East (中華丈夫) [aka Shaolin Challenges Ninja]	Hong Kong	Cantonese / Japanese	1978.12.30
Ninja Kids (鬼面忍者) [aka Ninja Death] [aka Venom of the Ninja]	Taiwan	Mandarin	1982
Pink Force Commando Golden Queen Commandos (紅粉兵團) Pink Force Commando (紅粉游俠)	Taiwan; Taiwan	Mandarin; Mandarin	1982; 1982
The Ninja Avenger (飛簷走壁) [aka Impossible Woman] [aka Ninja Apocalypse]	Taiwan	Mandarin / Japanese	1982.06.04
The Ninja Strikes Back (猛龍反擊)	Hong Kong	English	1982.06.17
Dragon Force (神探光頭妹)	Hong Kong	English / Cantonese	1982.12.16
The Challenge of the Lady Ninja (女忍者) [aka Never Kiss a Ninja]	Taiwan	Mandarin	1983.02.13
A Life of Ninja (亡命忍者) [aka Deadly Life of a Ninja]	Taiwan	Mandarin	1983.03.24
Mafia vs. Ninja (洪門鬥惡者)	Taiwan	Mandarin	1984
The Ninja and the Thief (至尊神偷) [aka To Catch a Thief]	Taiwan	Mandarin	1984
The Super Ninja (忍無可忍)	Taiwan	Mandarin	1984
Ninja in the U.S.A. (猛龍煞星) [aka USA Ninja]	Taiwan	Mandarin	1985
Ninja Over the Great Wall (長城大決戦)	Hong Kong	Cantonese	1987.05.08
Ninja Condors (東方巨龍)	Taiwan	Mandarin	1988
Ninja Evil Strike (忍者撞邪)	Hong Kong	Cantonese	1989
Lethal Ninja (終極忍者)	Hong Kong / China / Japan	Cantonese / Japanese	2006.04.30
The Resistance (反抗者)	China	Mandarin / Japanese	2011.11.10

=== Korean films ===
Title	Country	Language	Release Date
The Last Fist of Fury (最后의精武門)	South Korea	Korean	1977.01.13
Secret Ninja, Roaring Tiger (인자문살수) [aka Duel of In-ja Hall]	South Korea / Hong Kong	Korean	1982.08.14
Leopard Fist Ninja (돌아온雙龍) [aka The Return of Twin Dragons]	South Korea	Korean	1982.11.29
Shaolin Drunk Fighter (少林醉棍)	South Korea	Korean	1983.03.25
Revenge of the Drunken Master (八代醉拳)	South Korea	Korean	1984
Hong Kil Dong (洪吉童)	North Korea	Korean	1986

=== Filipino films ===
Title	Country	Language	Release Date
Hara of Ninja (Hari ng Ninja)	Philippines	Filipino / Tagalog	1969.09.27
Enforcer from Death Row [aka Ninja Assassins] [aka Ninja Nightmare]	Philippines	English	1976.07.09
Heroes For Hire	Philippines	English	1984
Ninja's Force	Philippines	English	1984.09.07
Ninja Warriors	Philippines	English	1985
Double Edge	Philippines	English	1986
Blackfire	Philippines	English	1986
Ultimax Force	Philippines	English	1986
Ninja Kids	Philippines	Filipino / Japanese	1986
The Legend of Ninja-Kol (Alamat ng ninja-kol)	Philippines	Filipino / Tagalog	1986.09.25
Me and Ninja Liit	Philippines	Filipino / Tagalog	1988.11.30

=== Indonesian films ===
Title	Country	Language	Release Date
Tracking Revenge (Melacak Dendam)	Indonesia	Indonesian	1989
The Shadow Strays	Indonesia	Indonesian / English / Japanese	2024.10.17

== International cinema ==
Title	Country	Language	Release Date
You Only Live Twice	UK	English / Japanese	1967.06.13
Holy Sword (Son Savaşçı)	Turkey	Turkish	1982
The Ninja Mission	Sweden / UK	English	1984.06.29
Death Warrior (Ölüm Savaşçısı)	Turkey	Turkish	1984
Eagle Island	Sweden	English	1986
The Summer of the Samurai	Germany	German	1986.06.19
Explosive Brigade Against the Ninjas (Brigada explosiva contra los ninjas)	Argentina	Spanish	1986.07.03
Death Shot (Ölüm Vurusu (1986))	Turkey	Turkish	1986
The Last Heroes (Son Kahramanlar)	Turkey	Turkish	1987
Commando	India	Hindi	1988.06.03
Alekhine's Defense: Checkmate with Death (Difesa Alekhine: Scacco con la morte)	Italy	Italian	1989
Russian Ninja (Russian Terminator)	Denmark / Sweden	English	1989.11.25
Mexican Ninja (El Ninja Mexicano)	Mexico	Spanish	1991.05.30
Mr. Bond	India	Hindi	1992.04.16
Tongan Ninja	New Zealand	English	2002.11.02
Shuriken School: The Ninja's Secret [animated film based on the Shuriken School TV series]	France / Spain	French / English	2007.09.26
Sons of Shadow	Canada	English	2008.03.09
Norwegian Ninja (Kommandør Treholt & ninjatroppen)	Norway	Norwegian	2010.08.13
Red Eagle: The Film (Águila Roja: la película) [film based on the Águila Roja TV series]	Spain	Spanish / French / English	2011.04.20
Zombie Massacre	Italy / United States / Germany / Canada	English	2013.07.01
The Ninja Immovable Heart	Australia	English	2014.02.27
Zombie Ninjas vs Black Ops	Australia	English	2015.10.10
Portuguese Ninja (Ninja Português)	Portugal	Portuguese / English / Japanese	2018.10.14

== Other films ==
=== Independent and short films ===
There are a number of independent and short films.
Title	Country	Language	Release Date
Miami Connection	United States / South Korea	English	1987.05
Trailer: The Movie	United States	English	1999.03.12
Ninja Mission 2000	Sweden	English / Swedish	2000
Blood of the Samurai Blood of the Samurai Blood of the Samurai 2	United States; United States	English; English	2001.11.03; 2007
Beneath the Mask: Portrait of an American Ninja	United States	None	2005.02.03
Irish American Ninja	United States	English	2005.08.16
Super Ninja Bikini Babes [TV movie]	United States	English	2007.08.15
Fists of Righteous Harmony	United States	English	2008.11.21
Dracula vs the Ninja on the Moon	UK	English	2009.06.14
Ikenhisu: To Kill with One Blow	United States	English	2011.04.10
Sins of the Dragon	United States	English	2012.12.02
Ninja Janitors	United States	English	2014
Office Ninja	United States	English	2014.04.22
Red Ninja the Sister Hood	United States	English	2016.10.03
Commando Ninja Commando Ninja Commando Ninja II: Invasion America	France; France	English; English	2018.12.21; 2025.10.01
New York Ninja [Unfinished 1984 film re-constructed and completed with a new audio track in 2021]	United States	English	2021.10.02
War of the Ninja Monsters: Jaron vs Gouron (忍獣大戦記 蛇龍対號羅)	Japan	Japanese	2024
Short films
Ninja Theater Hosted by Sho Kosugi [video series] Ninja Theater Hosted by Sho Kosugi - "Katana" Ninja Theater Hosted by Sho Kosugi - "Bo" Ninja Theater Hosted by Sho Kosugi - "Ninja Fan" Ninja Theater Hosted by Sho Kosugi - "Tekagi" Ninja Theater Hosted by Sho Kosugi - "Shikomizue" Ninja Theater Hosted by Sho Kosugi - "Yari" Ninja Theater Hosted by Sho Kosugi - "Tonfa" Ninja Theater Hosted by Sho Kosugi - "Shobo" Ninja Theater Hosted by Sho Kosugi - "Self Defense" Ninja Theater Hosted by Sho Kosugi - "Jitte" Ninja Theater Hosted by Sho Kosugi - "Kama" Ninja Theater Hosted by Sho Kosugi - "Nunchaku" Ninja Theater Hosted by Sho Kosugi - "Manriki-Gusari"	United States; United States; United States; United States; United States; United States; United States; United States; United States; United States; United States; United States; United States	English; English; English; English; English; English; English; English; English; English; English; English; English	1986; 1986; 1986; 1986; 1986; 1986; 1986; 1986; 1986; 1986; 1986; 1986; 1986
Symbol of Honor	Canada	English	1988
Ninja Bachelor Party	United States	English	1991.01.01
The Last Gaucho Ninja (El último gaucho ninja)	Argentina	Spanish	1992
Captain Pronin	Russia	Russian	1992
MVG	Sweden	English	1997.03.01
Cosmic Space Ninja	United States	English	1997.07.14
Mutrumuf	France	French	1999
The Ninja Spirit Project	Sweden	English	1999
The Beatle Fan	United States	English	2002.05.10
The Littlest Cowboy	United States	English	2003
A Ninja Pays Half My Rent	United States	English	2003.01
Dubbed and Dangerous 2	UK	English	2003.01.25
Home Security	United States	English	2003.08.09
Batman: Dark Justice [fan film]	United States	English	2003.12.31
The Creepees vs. Robot Monster Number Two	United States	English	2004.01.19
Undercut	United States	English	2004.02.20
The Climactic Death of Dark Ninja	United States	English	2004.03
Thunderman	Denmark	Danish / German	2004.06.28
Action Her00?	United States	English	2004.08.05
Bushido: The Way of the Warrior	UK	Japanese	2004.08.27
Who Makes Movies?	United States	English	2005.02.11
How to Cope with Rejection	UK	English	2005.06.01
The Lotus Flowers	UK	English	2005.08.17
Reel Guerrillas	United States	English	2005.09.12
Girl With Gun	United States	English	2006.01.19
Bullet of Life	United States	English	2006.04.28
Lonely Dragon	United States	English	2006.04.26
Ninja Star in the Eye	United States	English	2006.06.15
Flying Naked	United States	English	2006.10.02
Ninja Apocalypse!	United States	English / Cantonese / Gujarati	2007.03.17
Bloodbath	United States	English / Japanese	2007.06.18
Elektra: The Hand & The Devil [fan film]	United States	English	2009.04.08
Ninja Say What?!	United States	English	2010
Assassin	UK	English	2013.10.09
Ninja Theory (ニンジャセオリー) [puppet animation]	Japan	Japanese	2013.09.22
Japanese School Girl Chase #ninja (忍者女子高生 制服で大回転)	Japan	Japanese	2014.07.15
Ninja EX [spin-off of Blood of the Samurai]	United States	English	2016.11.08
ZVP: Zatoichi vs Predator (座頭市対プレデター)	Japan	Japanese	2017.12.09
Ninja Tango Mortale	Poland	English / Polish	2021.08.14
SEEK (四十九 - SEEK)	Japan	Japanese	2023.02.17

=== Cut-and-paste films ===
Between 1985 and 1989, many "Ninja"-titled Z-movies were written and/or directed by Hong Kong–based low budget director Godfrey Ho. Ho's "cut-and-paste" technique of creating his ninja movies involved shooting a large amount of largely random ninja combat and interstitial footage that would be spliced with existing footage from incomplete, abandoned, or lesser known Asian films, many of which were not martial arts films; as a result, these films often appear to have two parallel storylines. The films were recorded without sound, so although the gweilo actors spoke English while recording their lines, they were dubbed over by other voice actors. Ho reportedly used multiple pseudonyms to direct these films, so the exact number of films that can be credited to him as such is unclear. The production and distribution of the majority of these cut-and-paste films were through Joseph Lai's companies IFD Films & Arts Limited (39 films) and ADDA Audio Video Limited (2 films), and Tomas Tang's Filmark International Ltd. (at least 28 films). Additionally, two other Hong Kong–based companies, First Films and Ocean Shores, produced and distributed one film each. From 2012 to 2013, a parody homage web series entitled Ninja the Mission Force was produced by Dark Maze Studios. In 2023, Yidali International, an independent Italian company, released a "sequel" to Ninja Operation 5: Godfather the Master.
Title	Release Date
Ninja Thunderbolt [First cut-and-paste film. Newly filmed scenes were added to The Ninja and the Thief (至尊神偷) (see Chinese films list above)]	1985
Ninja Champion	1985
Ninja Dragon	1985
Golden Ninja Warrior Ninja Terminator Golden Ninja Warrior Diamond Ninja Force [aka Ghost Ninja] The Ultimate Ninja	1985; 1986; 1986; 1987
Ninja the Protector	1986
Ninja Hunt	1986
The Ninja Squad	1986
Challenge the Ninja	1986
Ninja Destroyer	1986
Commando the Ninja Commando the Ninja [aka American Commando Ninja] Born a Ninja	1986; 1986
Ninja Knight / Official Exterminator Ninja Knight: Thunder Fox [aka The Ninja Empire] Ninja Knight 2: Blood Brothers [aka Ninja Brothers of Blood] [aka Ninja Killer] [aka Official Exterminator: Kill For Love] Ninja Knight 3: Heaven's Hell [aka Official Exterminator 2: Heaven's Hell] Ninja Knight 4: Joy for Living Dead [aka Official Exterminator 3: Joy For Living Dead] The Ultimate Ninja Challenge [aka Official Exterminator 4: Goddess Mission] Night of the Ninja [aka Official Exterminator 5: Enter the Victory]	1986; 1987; 1987; 1987; 1987; 1987
The Ninja Showdown	1987
Cobra Against Ninja	1987
Ninja Commandments	1987
Ninja Kill	1987
American Commando: Angel's Blood Mission [aka Advent Commando: Angel's Blood Mission]	1987
Platoon the Warriors	1987
Zodiac Power Zodiac Power: The Supermaster [aka Zodiac America: The Supermaster] [aka Zombie vs Ninja] [aka The Gravedigger] Zodiac Power 2: Evil Destroyer [aka Zodiac America 2: Evil Destroyer]	1987; 1988
Ninja Operation Ninja Operation: Knight and Warrior [aka Ninja: Silent Assassin] Ninja Operation 2: Way of Challenge [aka Ninja Strike Force] Ninja Operation 3: Licensed to Terminate Ninja Operation 4: Thunderbolt Angels [aka Ninja Powerforce] Ninja Operation 5: Godfather the Master [aka Power of Ninjitsu] Ninja Operation 6: Champion on Fire [aka Ninja Avengers] Ninja Operation 7: Royal Warriors [aka Hands of Death]	1988; 1988; 1988; 1988; 1988; 1988; 1988
Rage of a Ninja	1988
Ninja of the Magnificence [aka American Ninja the Magnificent]	1988
Full Metal Ninja	1988
Thunder Kids Thunder Kids: Golden Adventure [aka Thunder Ninja Kids: Golden Adventure] Thunder Kids 2: Wonderful Mission [aka Thunder Ninja Kids: Wonderful Mission] Thunder Kids 3: Hunt for the Devil Boxer [aka ''Thunder Ninja Kids: Hunt for the Devil Boxer] Thunder Kids 4: Little Kickboxer [aka Thunder Ninja Kids: Little Kickboxer]	1989; 1989; 1989; 1989
Filmark International Ltd.
Ninja Masters of Death [aka Ninja Project Daredevil] [aka Grandmasters of Death]	1985
Bionic Ninja [aka Ninja Assassins]	1986
Silver Dragon Ninja	1986
Instant Rage	1986
Ninja Warrior from Beyond [aka Ninja Death Squad] [aka Black Panther]	1986
Ninja Fantasy [aka Twinkle Ninja Fantasy] [aka Ninja Project] [aka Empire of the Ninjas]	1986
Clash of the Ninjas	1986
Ninja, The Violent Sorcerer	1986
Ninja Phantom Heroes Ninja, Phantom Heroes U.S.A. [aka Ninja Empire] Ninja and the Warriors of Fire [aka Warriors of Fire] [aka Ninja 8: Warriors of Fire] Ninja: American Warrior Death Code: Ninja	1986; 1987; 1987; 1987
Ninja in Action	1987
The Thundering Ninja	1987
Golden Ninja Invasion	1987
Ninja's Extreme Weapons	1987
Empire of the Spiritual Ninja	1987
Top Mission	1987
RoboVampire RoboVampire 2: Devil's Dynamite [aka Devil's Dynamite] RoboVampire 3: Counter Destroyer [aka Counter Destroyer]	1987; 1989
Vampire Raiders: Ninja Queen	1988
Ninja Demon's Massacre	1988
Ninja in the Killing Fields [aka The Ninja Connection]	1988
Ninja Force of Assassins	1988
Tough Ninja the Shadow Warrior	1988
Ninja the Battalion	1988
The Shadow Killers [aka Ninja the Shadow Killers]	1989
Thunder Score	1989
First Films
City Ninja [aka Ninja Holocaust]	1985
Ocean Shores
Ninja vs. Ninja	1987
Dark Maze Studios
Ninja the Mission Force Ninja the Mission Force 01: Ninja Begininator Ninja the Mission Force 02: Ninja Godfather Ninja the Mission Force 03: Citizen Ninja Ninja the Mission Force 04: 'N' is for Ninja Ninja the Mission Force 05: Ninja Virus Ninja the Mission Force 06: Space Ninja in Space Ninja the Mission Force 07: Ninja Exorcist Ninja the Mission Force 08: Ninja Delivery Ninja the Mission Force 09: Night of the Ninja Ninja the Mission Force 10: Fists of Ninja Ninja the Mission Force Bonus: The Ninja Christmas Special Ninja the Mission Force 11: Bruce Fights Back from the Grave Ninja the Mission Force 12: Bruce We Miss You Ninja the Mission Force 13: The Clones of Bruce Ninja the Mission Force 14: Image of Bruce Ninja the Mission Force 15: Bruce - A Dragon Story Ninja the Mission Force 16: They Call Him Bruce Ninja the Mission Force 17: The Real Bruce Ninja the Mission Force 18: Bruce's Greatest Revenge Ninja the Mission Force 19: Treasure of Bruce Ninja the Mission Force 20: Bruce the Invincible	2012.02.15; 2012.02.22; 2012.02.29; 2012.03.07; 2012.03.14; 2012.03.21; 2012.03.28; 2012.04.11; 2012.04.18; 2012.04.25; 2012.08.07; 2013.03.22; 2013.03.22; 2013.03.22; 2013.03.22; 2013.03.22; 2013.03.22; 2013.03.22; 2013.03.22; 2013.03.22; 2013.03.22
Yidali International
Ninja The Godfather Part II (Ninja Il Padrino Parte II)	2023.04.15

=== Minor roles ===
Ninja characters appear in minor roles in many films.
Title	Country	Language	Release Date
Nemuri Kyōshirō Sleepy Eyes of Death 1: The Chinese Jade (眠狂四郎殺法帖) Sleepy Eyes of Death 3: Full Circle Killing (眠狂四郎円月斬り) Sleepy Eyes of Death 7: The Mask of the Princess (眠狂四郎多情剣) Sleepy Eyes of Death 12: Castle Menagerie (眠狂四郎悪女狩り)	Japan; Japan; Japan; Japan	Japanese; Japanese; Japanese; Japanese	1963.11.02; 1964.05.23; 1966.03.12; 1969.01.11
The Pink Panther Revenge of the Pink Panther Curse of the Pink Panther	UK; UK	English; English	1978.07.19; 1983.08.12
Last Hurrah for Chivalry (豪俠)	Hong Kong	Cantonese	1979.11.22
Fist of Vengeance [aka Bruce's Fists of Vengeance]	Philippines	English	1980.08.22
Shōgun [Theatrical Edit of the TV miniseries]	United States	English / Japanese	1980.11.09
The Bushido Blade	UK / United States / Japan	English / Japanese	1981
The Legend of the Owl (貓頭鷹)	Hong Kong	Cantonese	1981.04.30
Raw Force	Philippines / United States	English	1982.07.09
Fireback	Philippines / United States	English	1983.02.01
The Little Heroes of Shaolin Temple (小和尚出馬)	Taiwan	Mandarin	1984
Burning Power	Philippines / United States	English	1984.01.26
My Lucky Stars (福星高照)	Hong Kong	Cantonese	1985.02.10
24 Hours to Midnight	United States	English	1985.07
Pee-wee's Big Adventure	United States	English	1985.08.09
Millionaires Express (富貴列車)	Hong Kong	Cantonese	1986.01.30
Police Academy 4: Citizens on Patrol	United States	English	1987.04.03
Blood Orgy of the Leather Girls	United States / Canada	English	1988
Pushed Too Far	United States	English	1988.02.25
Strike Commando 2 (Trappola diabolica)	Italy / Philippines	English	1988.08.17
Order of the Eagle	United States	English	1989.01
Cannibal Women in the Avocado Jungle of Death	United States	English	1989.03.15
Licence to Kill	UK	English / Spanish	1989.07.14
Blind Fury	United States	English	1989.08.17
Operation Las Vegas	France	English	1990.04
Triple-B / L.E.T.H.A.L. Ladies Guns Do or Die Return to Savage Beach	United States; United States; United States	English; English; English	1990.11.09; 1991.06.28; 1998
Journey of Honor	United States / Japan / UK	English / Japanese	1991
Bloodsucking Pharaohs in Pittsburgh	United States	English	1991.05.02
The Roller Blade Seven	United States	English	1991.09.06
Bernard and the Genie [TV movie]	UK	English	1991.12.23
Kung Fu Rascals	United States	English	1992
Knock Outs	United States	English	1992.08.26
The Adventures of El Frenetico and Go Girl	United States	English	1993
The Last Action Hero	United States	English	1993.06.18
Dragon Fire	United States	English	1993.10.20
Sidekicks	United States	English	1993.12.17
Trading Mom	United States	English	1994.05.13
Double Dragon	United States / France / Denmark	English	1994.11.04
Backfire!	United States	English	1995.01.20
Sailor Victory [OVA] Sailor Victory Part 1 (聖羅ヴィクトリー 花鳥風月 乙女の舞! 事件だョ、全員集合!!) Sailor Victory Part 2 (聖羅ヴィクトリー 波乱万丈 乙女のピンチ! 悪しき魔性に桜散る!?)	Japan; Japan	Japanese; Japanese	1995.01.25; 1995.08.25
East Meets West	Japan	Japanese / English	1995.08.12
Expect No Mercy	United States	English	1995.12.26
Toad Warrior	United States	English	1996
The Crow: City of Angels	United States	English	1996.08.30
Pervirella	UK	English	1997.09.19
Two's a Mob	Canada	English	1998
Let's Talk About Sex	United States	English	1998.09.11
Violent Shit III: Infantry of Doom	Germany	German	1999.03.21
Bowfinger	United States	English	1999.08.13
Taxi Taxi 2 Taxi 3	France; France	French / Japanese / German; French	2000.03.25; 2003.01.29
Rugrats in Paris: The Movie [Animation]	United States / Germany	English	2000.11.17
Jarrett	Sweden	English	2001
Recess: School's Out [Animation]	United States / Japan	English	2001.02.16
Stereo Future (ステレオ フューチャー)	Japan	Japanese	2001.06.05
Cats & Dogs [Animation]	United States	English	2001.07.04
Millennium Actress (千年女優) [Anime]	Japan	Japanese	2001.07.28
The Master of Disguise	United States	English	2002.08.02
Tower of Etruria [OVA hentai] Tower of Etruria Volume 1 (タワーオブエトルリア Vol.1 妖艶の魔術師) Tower of Etruria Volume 2 (タワーオブエトルリア Vol.2 性欲に溺れた妖精)	Japan; Japan	Japanese; Japanese	2003.06.25; 2004.05.25
Inspector Gadget 2	United States	English	2003.03.11
Kung Phooey!	United States	English	2003.03.11
Bugi Fiction	Finland	English / Russian	2003.04.09
Nikos the Impaler	Germany	English	2003.05.13
Zatoichi (座頭市)	Japan	Japanese	2003.09.06
Operation Dance Sensation [de]	Germany	German	2003.09.12
Prison-A-Go-Go!	United States	English	2003.10.27
The Last Samurai	United States / Japan / New Zealand	English / Japanese	2003.12.05
Sci-Fighter	United States	English	2004.05.17
Transformed	United States	English	2005.09.10
Torrente 3: El Protector	Spain	Spanish / Italian / Catalan / English	2005.09.30
The King Maker (กบฏท้าวศรีสุดาจัน)	Thailand	English / Thai	2005.10.20
The Adventures of Brer Rabbit [Animation]	United States	English	2006.03.21
Date Number One	United States	English	2006.05.13
X-Men: The Last Stand	United States / Canada / UK	English	2006.05.26
War	United States	English / Japanese / Cantonese	2007.09.14
Fight Ring	United States	English	2008
Speed Racer	United States / Australia / Germany	English	2008.05.09
Brighton Wok: The Legend of Ganja Boxing	UK	English / French	2008.07.11
Pineapple Express	United States	English / Cantonese / Korean	2008.08.06
Queens of Langkasuka (ปืนใหญ่จอมสลัด) [aka Legend of the Tsunami Warrior]	Thailand	Thai	2008.08.12
Super Tromette Action Movie Go!	United States	English	2008.09.30
Ong Bak Ong Bak 2 (องค์บาก 2) Ong Bak 3 (องค์บาก 3)	Thailand; Thailand	Thai; Thai	2008.12.04; 2010.05.05
The Samurai of Strongsville, Ohio	United States	English	2010.01.08
Tekken	United States / Japan	English / Japanese	2010.03.20
Puppet Master: Axis of Evil	United States	English	2010.07.27
Yamada: The Samurai of Ayothaya (ซามูไร อโยธยา YAMADA)	Thailand	Thai / Japanese / Burmese	2010.12.02
The Scorpion King 3: Battle for Redemption	United States	English	2012.01.17
Kill 'Em All	United States	English	2012.12.11
Kamen Rider Ex-Aid the Movie: True Ending (劇場版 仮面ライダーエグゼイド トゥルー・エンディング)	Japan	Japanese	2017.08.05
Batman: Soul of the Dragon [animated film]	United States	English	2021.01.12
Kamen Rider Revice the Movie: Battle Familia (劇場版 仮面ライダーリバイス バトルファミリア)	Japan	Japanese	2022.07.22
Deadpool & Wolverine	United States	English	2024.07.26

=== Miscellaneous ===
A number of films feature characters who are often mistaken for ninja, or whose titles, artwork, and/or trailers have misrepresented the presence of ninja in them.
Title	Notes	Release Date
Kaiketsu Kurozukin (快傑黒頭巾) [various films from 1936, 1953-1960, 1981, 1990]	Despite the black hooded costume, "Kaiketsu Kurozukin" ("The Black Hooded Man"), like "Kurama Tengu", is not a ninja, but is actually a samurai who disguises himself to fight corruption and right wrongs.	1936 etc...
Murasaki Zukin (紫頭巾) [various films from 1957, 1958, 1963, 1982]	Despite the hooded costume, "Murasaki Zukin" ("The Purple Hood"), like "Kurama Tengu" and "Kaiketsu Kurozukin", is not a ninja, but rather a "Zorro" type of character.	1957 etc...
Hakuba Dōji (白馬童子) [two films + TV series]	Despite the hooded costume, "Hakuba Dōji'" ("Young Swordsman on the White Horse"), like "Kurama Tengu", "Kaiketsu Kurozukin" and "Murasaki Zukin", is not a ninja, but a samurai and a "Lone Ranger" type of character.	1960
Death Machines	About three martial arts fighters (one white, one black, and one Asian) injected with a serum that turns them into zombie-like assassins working for a Japanese yakuza woman.	1976.06
The Last Reunion [aka Revenge of the Bushido Blade] [aka Ninja Nightmare]	A Japanese boy who witnessed his parents' murders dedicates his life to following the samurai code of Bushido in order to avenge their deaths.	1980
The Challenge [aka Sword of the Ninja]	About rival brothers from a modern-day samurai clan.	1982.07.23
The Last Dragon	Lead character dresses as a ninja in one scene.	1985.03.22
Ninja Turf	Features a Japanese assassin who is a yakuza rather than a ninja.	1985.03.23
Gymkata	Original movie poster artwork only.	1985.05.03
The Warrior and Ninja (Bajing Ireng dan Jaka Sembung)	Features an Indonesian character dressed in a ninja-like costume.	1985.06
Watch the Shadows Dance [aka Nightmaster]	Karate students dress in ninja costumes and play paintball war games at night.	1987
American Samurai	Samurai teacher character briefly pretends to be a ninja during student's training.	1992.12.22
Ella Enchanted	The Red Guards resemble ninja.	2004.04.09
The Pacifier	Features Korean agents dressed in ninja-like costumes.	2005.03.04
In the Name of the King: A Dungeon Siege Tale	The King's stealth fighters resemble ninja.	2007.11.29
Royal Kill	About a warrior/assassin from the Kingdom of Samarza.	2009.04.10
Coweb (戰·無雙) [aka Ninja Masters]	Misleading title and cover artwork on North American DVD release only.	2009.05.01
The Warrior's Way	About clans of Korean warriors/assassins.	2010.12.03

== See also ==
- List of ninja television programs
- List of ninja video games
- List of Japanese films
- Ninja in popular culture
- Samurai cinema
