= Ninjas vs. Zombies =

- Still from fight scene in Ninjas vs. Zombies
- Directed by: Justin Timpane
- Written by: Justin Timpane
- Starring: Cory Eskridge Okouchi; Daniel Ross; Dan Guy; Carla Okouchi; P.J. Megaw; Daniel Mascarello; Melissa McConnell; Tara Moore
- Release date: October 31, 2008
- Country: United States
- Language: English

Ninjas vs. Zombies is a 2008 American independent film written and directed by Justin Timpane. It parodies the science-fiction, horror, zombie and ninja genres. The rough cut of the film premiered as a "bootleg screening" on October 31, 2008, and later screened on November 1, 2008 in Leesburg, Virginia at the historic Tally Ho Theatre.

== Plot ==
The film revolves around seven friends, three of whom are magically granted the use of ninja powers to fight back against hordes of zombies, and their evil leader Eric. The press kit for the film describes the premise as follows:

"Seven friends, struggling with late 20s, early 30s life, find themselves in terrifying danger when a long dead loved one is magically resurrected and starts devouring souls. To make matters worse, three of them have been granted the power of the ninja, and now must lead the fight against a power they cannot hope to vanquish. If they fail, the undead will overrun their little town, and maybe the world."

== Cast ==
- Cory Eskridge Okouchi as Cole
- Daniel Ross as Kyle Walker
- Dan Guy as Randall
- Carla Okouchi as Lily
- P.J. Megaw as Eric
- Daniel Mascarello as Fitz
- Melissa McConnell as Anne
- Tara Moore as Kara
- Will Stendeback as Herman
- Arthur Rowan as Barry
- Shante Alerte as Dru
- Eric Harrison as Interviewer 1
- Sarah Scheiner as Smarmy Secretary
- Ted Taylor as Dr. Wood
- Eric Martin Strauss as Strauss
- Michael Hayes as Mr. Hayes
- Duanne Barbour as D.B.
- Garth Porter as Mr. Algar
- Veronica Parks as Veronica
- Kelly Timpane as Interviewer 2
- Leanna Chamish as Mom
- Joe Ripple as Dad
- Tiffany Ariany as Katie
- Megan Timpane as Box Office Clerk
- Crystal Milana as Phantom Bombshell
- Justin Timpane as Phil

== Production ==
=== Development ===
In 2006, writer and director Justin Timpane, a University of Mary Washington graduate, had completed his work as an actor and composer for the 2007 film Dead Hunt. He had also acted in Little White Boy and a pilot for a series called Life Sucks, and written and directed two other films. After watching Clerks 2, Timpane and his friend Daniel Ross (whom he had met during the production of Timewarp Productions' Crawler in 2003) decided to make their own film. While browsing videos at a Blockbuster store in Washington, D.C., they started brainstorming ideas for their film, and eventually came up with the idea of American ninjas fighting a zombie outbreak. The film, named "Ninjas vs. Zombies", was to be aimed at "late-night college crowd[s] who just wanted some combination of comedy, action and horror". In January 2007, they and Justin's wife Kelly Timpane formed their company, Endlight Entertainment LLC. Justin wrote the first script for the film with some input from Kelly, drawing inspiration from Clerks 2, Chasing Amy, Scream, Harry Potter, Dawn of the Dead, Highlander, Blade and Serenity. The script was rewritten and finalized later that year to reflect character-based comedy and drama, similar to Buffy the Vampire Slayer and Lost. Ross and Arthur Rowan were brought on to assist with revisions of the screenplay.

=== Filming ===
Timpane shot the rough cut in his basement before shooting the feature version. Principal photography of the film began in May 2008. The film was shot in movie theaters, comic book stores, and coffee shops in Leesburg, Manassas, Warrenton and Gainesville in Northern Virginia and metropolitan Washington, D.C., and was completed on a budget of $10,000. It was funded using the Timpanes' personal Visa and Mastercard credit cards. Rowan was going to choreograph the fight scenes, but left production to perform and choreograph fights for the Pennsylvania Renaissance Faire, and was replaced with Cory Eskridge Okouchi.

=== Casting ===
Casting was done in March 2008, with auditionees from New Jersey, North Carolina and the Washington, D.C. area. Okouchi brought along talented theater performers and technical contacts from Washington. Actors and actresses cast for the film included Okouchi, his wife Carla Okouchi, Daniel Ross, Dan Guy, P.J. Megaw, Daniel Mascarello, Melissa McConnell, Tara Moore, Will Stendeback, Rowan, Shante Alerte, Eric Harrison, Sarah Scheiner, Ted Taylor, Eric Martin Strauss, Michael Hayes, Duanne Barbour, Garth Porter, Veronica Parks, Leanna Chamish, Joe Ripple, Tiffany Ariany, Megan Timpane, and Crystal Milana. Justin and Kelly Timpane appeared in the film as Phil and an interviewer, respectively.

=== Special effects ===
The special and visual effects were done by Michael H. Weinstein and Cory Eskridge Okouchi, and supervised by Brian Anderson (1986–2014).

=== Soundtrack ===
The film features a theme song written and performed by Nick Bognar and Michael Roth. The song is also included on Bognar's 2009 album Our Mouths Are Open.

== Critical reception ==
Ninjas vs. Zombies was anticipated within the horror film community, due in part to its combination of two popular genres, zombies and ninjas. In a comment typifying the appeal of the hybrid, Bloody Disgusting noted, "There are ninjas, and there are zombies, what more do you need?"

In February 2009, the film garnered an "Award of Merit: Feature Film" at "The Indie Fest". Another horror genre publication, Fatally Yours, urged its readers to see the film, describing it as "a homegrown indy filmed right here in Northern VA", with elements of Evil Dead, Clerks 2, Buffy the Vampire Slayer, The Bourne Identity, and Harry Potter. It also called the film "funny, violent, a rollercoaster; with GOBS of local talent - and international appeal".

The film has also been criticized for its thematic similarity to earlier works. One critic joked that it should not be confused with 1987's singular Ninja vs. Zombie, 1997's Zombie Ninja Gangbangers, or 2004's Vampires vs. Zombies. Prior to its release, the film's third trailer received a mixed review from Chris Beaumont of Newstex. Beaumont described the film as a "super low-budget outing" that "looks terrible", but praised it for the filmmakers making up for their technical flaws with "energy and love for the genre".

== Sequels ==
A sequel to the film, titled Ninjas vs. Vampires, was released in early 2011. A third film, Ninjas vs. Monsters, released in 2013.
