= Message from Space: Galactic Wars =

- Genre: Tokusatsu, Science fiction
- Created by: Shotaro Ishinomori; Toei Company
- Based on: Message from Space by Kinji Fukasaku; Shotaro Ishinomori; Masahiro Noda
- Written by: Masaru Igami
- Directed by: Minoru Yamada
- Starring: Hiroyuki Sanada; Akira Oda; Ryo Nishida; Iwao Tabuchi; Yoko Akitani
- Narrated by: Asao Koike
- Composers: Shunsuke Kikuchi; Kenichiro Morioka
- Country of origin: Japan
- No. of episodes: 27

Production
- Producers: Kanetake Ochiai; Keizo Nanajo; Akimasa Ito; Masahide Shinozuka
- Running time: 30 minutes
- Production companies: Toei Company; Ishimori Productions; I.D.D.h.

Original release
- Network: ANN (TV Asahi)
- Release: July 8, 1978 – January 27, 1979

Message from Space: Galactic Wars (宇宙からのメッセージ・銀河大戦, Uchū kara no Messēji: Ginga Taisen) is a Japanese TV series written by Shotaro Ishinomori, co-produced by Toei Company and TV Asahi and aired on TV Asahi from July 8, 1978 to January 27, 1979, with a total of 27 episodes. It is a spin-off of the 1978 film Message from Space.

== Cast ==
- Hayato Gen/Maboroshi (ゲン・ハヤト/まぼろし, Gen Hayato/Maboroshi): Hiroyuki Sanada (真田広之, Sanada Hiroyuki)
- Ryu/Nagareboshi (リュウ/流れ星, Ryū/Nagareboshi): Akira Oda (織田あきら, Oda Akira)
- Ape-Man Ballou (猿人バルー, Enjin Barū): Ryo Nishida (西田良, Nishida Ryō)
- Tonto (トント) (Voice): Iwao Tabuchi (田渕岩夫, Tabuchi Iwao)
- Sofia (ソフィア): Yoko Akitani (秋谷陽子, Akitani Yōko)
- Narrator (ナレーター, Narētā): Asao Koike (小池朝雄, Koike Asao)

=== Suit actors ===
- Maboroshi: Jun Murakami
- Nagareboshi: Osamu Kaneda, Tsutomu Kitagawa

== Staff ==
MESSAGE FROM SPACE SPACE WARS
Producers	Kanetake Ochiai, Keizo Shichijo, Akimasa Ito, Masahide Shinozuka, Hubert Chonzu
Created by	Shotaro Ishinomori
Serialized in	Shogakukan's "Televi-Kun", Kodansha's "TV Magazine", Tokuma Shoten's "TV Land"
Written by	Masaru Igami, Miyoko Nagase, Ayuko Anzai, Taku Eren
Music	Shunsuke Kikuchi & Kenichiro Morioka
Theme Song	"Oh Braves Cross the Galaxy" "Love is Beyond the Stars"
Lyrics	Shotaro Ishinomori
Performed by	Isao Sasaki, Columbia Male Choir
Monologue	Asao Koike
Theme From "Sankuokai"	Éric Charden
Stunts by	Japan Action Enterprises

Staff
Directors of Photography	Sakuji Shiomi, Shozo Sakane, Yuhei Harada, Takeharu Kobayashi, Kiyoshi Kitasaka
Lighting	Tokuji Wakaki, Keiichi Kano, Yasuo Otani, Yoshikazu Watanabe, Heisaku Kato, Tsuyoshi Muguruma
Sound Recordists	Koichi Sakamoto, Masayuki Kato
Art	Akira Takahashi (Cosmo Productions)
Editing by	Takeo Araki
Scripter Girls	Kyoko Kurokawa, Yuko Nishikawa, Yoshiko Ishida, Yoko Miru
Equipment and Decorating	Shigekazu Yoshioka, Yoshiaki Shiraishi, Terumasa Tabata, Shigeharu Yamamoto
Assistant Directors	Mitsukazu Kawamura, Hideo Suzuki, Kiyomi Yada, Yuji Takakura, Isamu Sone, Kazue Saito, Masaki Godai
Beauty & Hairdressing	Towa Beauty
Costumes	Tamotsu Iwatuki, Muneyuki Kuroki
Acting Officers	Eiji Morimura, Takayasu Kuzuhara, Yoshiaki Yamashita, Masaru Fujiwara, Mamoru Shimokawa
VFX	Minoru Nakano
Special Video Programming	Commodore Japan
Stunt Arrangers	Toshio Sugawara, Ikuo Miyoshi, Junnosuke Doi, Junji Yamaoka (JAC)
Chief Managers	Yoshio Yamamoto, Manshu Sugiura, Takahiro Tarayaka, Hiroshi Mazawa, Hiroshi Kanada, Susumu Uji
Special Thanks	Nara Dreamland
Film Processing	IMAGICA

English Dubbing	3B Productions
Music Sound Design	Doug Lackey, Joseph Zappala
Associate Producer Supervising Editor	Michael Part
Written, Produced and Directed by	Bunker Jenkins
Editor	Floyd Ingram
Additional FX	George Budd
Post Production	Gomillion Sound, American Film Factory
Another Presentation from	Newhope Entertainment

SFX Unit
SFX Made By	Special Effects Research Laboratory
Practical Effects	Subaru Suzuki
Director of Photography	Satoru Takanashi
Art Director	Tetsuzo Osawa
Lighting	Akiyoshi Hiji
Produced by	Yoshiyuki Nakamura
Director	Nobuo Yajima

Directed by	Minoru Yamada, Tomoomi Yoda, Miki Wakabayashi
Produced by	Toei Company, TV Asahi
In Association with	IDDH, France 2

== Songs ==
Opening theme

- "Yūsha yo Ginga o Watare" (勇者よ銀河を渡れ)
  - Lyrics: Shotaro Ishimori (石森 章太郎, Ishimori Shotaro)
  - Composition and Arrangement: Shunsuke Kikuchi (菊池 俊輔, Kikuchi Shunsuke)
  - Artist: Isao Sasaki (ささきいさお, Sasaki Isao) with Columbia Male Choir (コロムビア男声合唱団, Koromubia dansei gasshō-dan)

Ending theme

- "Ai wa Hoshizora no Kanata ni" (愛は星空の彼方に)
  - Composition and arrangement: Kenichiro Morioka (森岡賢一郎, Morioka Ken'ichirō)

== Episodes ==
No.	Title	Directed by	Written by	Original release date
1	"Bizarre! The Black Spaceship"	Minoru Yamada	Masaru Inoue	July 8, 1978
When the evil Gavanas Empire invades the 15th Solar System, Hayato Gen joins forces with Ryu and Balu to fight back!
2	"Terror! The Ninja Corps"	Minoru Yamada	Masaru Inoue	July 15, 1978
Hayato, Ryu, and Balu are scouted by a local band of rebels, but Ryu has doubts about joining up.
3	"A Beautiful Messenger From Earth"	Minoru Yamada	Masaru Inoue	July 22, 1978
Hayato saves a beautiful messenger from Earth. But does her arrival bring hope, or despair?
4	"Fighter for Justice, Shooting Star"	Minoru Yamada	Masaru Inoue	July 29, 1978
Roxair commissions a grand palace to be built on Analys, and Hayato makes a rash decision.
5	"The Cursed School"	Tomoomi Yoda	Masaru Inoue	August 12, 1978
Hayato's attempt to check in at his old school reveals a conspiracy and a trap that will turn Balu on his colleagues.
6	"What is the Monster Empire?"	Tomoomi Yoda	Masaru Inoue	August 19, 1978
Ryu steals a Gavanas transport and attempts to gain an audience with Roxair.
7	"Friendship Shining in the Starry Sky"	Minoru Yamada	Masaru Inoue	September 9, 1978
An SOS call on Analys leads the Liabe crew to kindly resistance leader Dan and his adopted sister Hana.
8	"The Cruel Ape Hunt"	Minoru Yamada	Masaru Inoue	September 16, 1978
In order to cement Roxair's rule over Cita, the Gavanas attempt to round up the planet's native population.
9	"The Devil Castle of the Gavanas"	Tomoomi Yoda	Masaru Inoue	September 23, 1978
Hoping to sacrifice Sofia to consecrate the new Imperial Palace, Roxair sets a trap for Ryu, Hayato, and Balu.
10	"Destroy the Planet Earth"	Tomoomi Yoda	Masaru Inoue	September 30, 1978
The Gavanas blackmail a brilliant scientist into creating a ship that will let them attack Earth!
11	"The Princess of the Underground Kingdom"	Minoru Yamada	Masaru Inoue	October 7, 1978
A visit to the Ghost Mountains of Belda leads Hayato, Ryu, and Balu to a previously unknown civilization.
12	"Duel! The Mysterious Ninja Tower"	Minoru Yamada	Masaru Inoue	October 14, 1978
When the princess of the underground kingdom is kidnapped, the crew of the Liabe must fight to bring her back.
13	"The Miracle of the God Magnol"	Tomoomi Yoda	Miyoko Nagase	October 21, 1978
An old friend of Balu's plans to sell his island's religious artifacts to the Gavanas.
14	"The Terrible Flying Ninja"	Tomoomi Yoda	Masaru Inoue	October 28, 1978
The life of a kindly old man is disrupted when the Gavanas try to blackmail him into killing Hayato and Ryu!
15	"Fly, Embracing Love!"	Minoru Yamada	Ayuko Anzai	November 4, 1978
Hayato must stop a terrible man-made plague from spreading on Belda.
16	"The Girl in the Trick House"	Minoru Yamada	Masaru Inoue	November 11, 1978
A disguised assassin works her way into Hana's good graces and sets a trap for Hayato and Ryu.
17	"The Golden Vampire Princess"	Miki Wakabayashi	Taku Eren	November 18, 1978
The Liabe brings the last survivor of a doomed world to the village of Nazca, which is facing a mysterious threat.
18	"Great Escape! The Boy Ninja Team"	Miki Wakabayashi	Masaru Inoue	November 25, 1978
The heroes must stop the Gavanas's plan to kidnap children and turn them into a ninja army!
19	"Rise! The Warrior of the Wasteland!"	Tomoomi Yoda	Taku Eren	December 2, 1978
A mysterious water shortage on Planet Cita leads Hayato and the others to an occupied town and a fallen hero.
20	"The Legend of the Golden Ship"	Tomoomi Yoda	Masaru Inoue	December 9, 1978
In order to quell a possible Delan uprising, the Gavanas exploit a local legend.
21	"The Monster From Another Dimension"	Minoru Yamada	Masaru Inoue	December 16, 1978
The fall of an extradimensional meteorite presages the appearance of a terrible monster on Belda.
22	"Great Demon God Roxair"	Minoru Yamada	Masaru Inoue	December 23, 1978
After Sofia is set adrift in space, the crew of the Liabe goes in search of her.
23	"Blow Up the Imperial Palace"	Tomoomi Yoda	Masaru Inoue	December 30, 1978
Roxair's terrible new form leads the rebels to plot the destruction of the Imperial Palace.
24	"Great Comet Zatan Appears"	Tomoomi Yoda	Masaru Inoue	January 6, 1979
As a terrible comet approaches Planet Belda, Hayato seeks a way to destroy Roxair once and for all.
25	"The End of Planet Belda"	Minoru Yamada	Masaru Inoue	January 13, 1979
Hayato, Ryu, and Balu race to evacuate Belda before the comet strikes.
26	"The Mystery of the Emeralida"	Minoru Yamada	Masaru Inoue	January 20, 1979
The Liabe searches for the pieces of the Emeralida, the only weapon that can destroy Roxair.
27	"Farewell, Heroes of the Galaxy"	Minoru Yamada	Masaru Inoue	January 27, 1979
The heroes face off against Roxair for the final time to try to restore peace to their planets.

== Manga adaptation ==
A manga adaptation by Kaoru Shintani was published in Kodansha's TV Magazine from August to December 1978.

== International broadcasts ==
Message from Space: Galactic Wars was broadcast in the Philippines in the early 1980s under the title Space Wars. It also aired in 1979 in parts of Europe under the title San Ku Kaï. It aired in parts of Latin America in the early 80s under the title "Sankuokai". In the United States, the series was retitled Space Ninja and dubbed by 3B Productions (Tranzor Z), but released straight-to-video (there is no documentation, currently, of any television broadcast) in 1981. 3B produced a compilation feature, Swords of the Space Ark, which was aired on the Christian Broadcasting Network in 1983. In Indonesia, it aired on SCTV In Mid 90s under the name title Ksatria dari Zelda (Knight from Zelda (Not to be confused with Legend of Zelda). Toei promoted the series overseas as Message from Space: Galaxy Wars.

- The French version's theme music for the opening and closing credits, different from the Japanese original one, was composed by Eric Charden.

== DVD release ==
During Otakon 2018, Discotek Media announced that they licensed the show for a one-disc SD on BD release. It was released on October 29, 2019, in Japanese with English subtitles.

== In popular culture ==
A television set playing an episode of Message from Space: Galactic Wars can be seen during a scene in the 2021 Netflix film Kate, which is set in Japan. The three main characters Hayato, Ballou and Ryu appear clearly during the scene.
