= Ninja Dragon =

1986 Hong Kong film by Godfrey Ho

- Film poster
- Directed by: Godfrey Ho
- Screenplay by: Godfrey Ho
- Story by: AAV Creative Unit
- Produced by: Joseph Lai; Betty Chan
- Starring: Richard Harrison; Bruce Stallion; Melvin Pitcher; Freya Patrick; Konrad Chang; Lily Lan; Martin Lee
- Cinematography: Raymond Chang
- Edited by: Nicky Au
- Music by: Stephen Tsang
- Production companies: IFD Films and Arts Limited
- Release date: 1986
- Running time: 85 minutes
- Country: Hong Kong
- Language: English

Ninja Dragon (Cantonese: 上海風雲 Jyutping: soeng^{6} hoi^{2} fung^{1} wan^{4}) is a 1986 Hong Kong English-language martial arts action crime film directed by Godfrey Ho. Produced by Joseph Lai and Betty Chan, the film stars Richard Harrison and Bruce Stallion in lead roles.

== Plot ==
Set in Great Shanghai – two rival gangs, the Furious Fox and the Black Eagle are fighting to establish domination in the territory. Only one force can stop the never-ending killings… The Ninja Dragon!

== Cast ==
- Richard Harrison as Ninja Master Gordon
- Bruce Stallion as Paul
- Melvin Pitcher
- Freya Patrick
- Konrad Chang
- Lily Lan
- Martin Lee
- Pierre Tremblay
- Chung Tien Shih
- Jean Tang
- Tien Mao
- Hsieh Wang
- Dick Lo
- Mason Shin
- Billy Pang
