= Blood of the Samurai =

2001 film by Aaron Yamasato

- Directed by: Aaron Yamasato
- Written by: Aaron Yamasato
- Produced by: Paul Booth
- Starring: Bryan Yamasaki; Michael Ng; Shawn Forsythe; Colleen Fujioka; Stephanie Sanchez; Rick Lum
- Production company: Hellcat Productions
- Distributed by: Cinema Epoch
- Release date: November 3, 2001 (HIFF)
- Running time: 75 minutes
- Country: United States
- Language: English
- Budget: $2,000

Blood of the Samurai is a 2001 American action film directed by Aaron Yamasato. It stars Bryan Yamasaki and Michael Ng as two friends who are possessed by a pair of ancient katanas. A mysterious man hunts them down to recover the swords. It premiered at the Hawaii International Film Festival in November 2001.

== Plot ==
Trent and Rob are plunged into a world of darkness and chaos when they find a bundle of stolen ancient samurai swords. Suddenly Trent knows how to wield a katana, Rob is writing death threats in Japanese, and a villain named The Hunter, armed with two crossbows, is stalking them. When he does not get what he wants, he abducts Trent's girlfriend Brooke. Trent realizes that life will never be the same as he stalks the night in search of Brooke.

== Cast ==
- Bryan Yamasaki as Trent
- Michael Ng as Rob
- Shawn Forsythe as the Hunter
- Colleen Fujioka as Brooke
- Stephanie Sanchez as Roxy
- Rick Lum as Reverend

== Production ==
Yamasato was inspired by the Japanese tokusatsu franchise Kikaider and subconsciously included homage to it that he only recognized later after others pointed it out. Screaming Mad George did special effects for the film.

== Release ==
Blood of the Samurai premiered at the Hawaii International Film Festival on November 3, 2001. Cinema Epoch released it on DVD in the US on June 4, 2013.

== Reception ==
Reviewing a rough cut of the film, Gary C. W. Chun of the Honolulu Star-Bulletin wrote that although the film start off well, the acting and writing are sub-par. Chun later labeled his review as an attempt to humorously critique the film. Albert Lanier of Ain't It Cool News called it "a cheesy, low budgeted, over-the-top b-movie that works like a charm". Stina Chyn of Film Threat rated it 4/5 stars and wrote that the action sequences make up for the occasional technical errors. Jeremy Blitz of DVD Talk rated it 2/5 stars and wrote, "While there are elements that are impressive in isolation, the whole doesn't work."

It received the Hawaii Film & Videomaker Award at the HIFF and a Telly Award.

== Television series ==
A six-episode TV series for Oc 16 aired in October 2003.
