= Undercut (film) =

- Directed by: Stephen Reedy
- Written by: Stephen Reedy
- Produced by: Stephen Reedy
- Starring: Eric Jacobus; Andy Leung; Todd Roy
- Cinematography: Stephen Reedy
- Edited by: Stephen Reedy; Eric Jacobus (Fight)
- Music by: Anton Patzner
- Release date: 2004
- Running time: 34 minutes
- Country: United States
- Languages: English, Cantonese
- Budget: $1,500 (Estimated)

Undercut is a 2004 martial arts film written and directed by Stephen Reedy.

== Synopsis ==
American Ninja Eric loses his job as a state employed peace officer when his job is outsourced to cheaper, cost effective Chinese labor. As if dealing with the hardships of unemployment weren't stressful enough, Ninja Dog is sick and needs expensive medicine.

== Release ==
Undercut was released online via The Stunt People sometime in 2004. It has also been screened at WonderCon, San Diego Comic-Con and the Metreon.

== Awards ==
In 2006, Undercut was nominated for the mtvU Student Filmmaker Award in the 2006 MTV Movie Awards. Despite large media coverage both local and national Undercut did not win. This is likely because MTV had deleted at least a few 100,000 online votes under the suspicion that there had been foul play. MTV informed the director Stephen Reedy that there had been a voting spike that they considered to be “unorganic”. However, it should be known that the other student films did not have the same media coverage or inbuilt following that Undercut already had with followers of The Stunt People and martial arts movie fans in general.
