= Mafia vs. Ninja =

1984 Taiwanese-Hong Kong film by Robert Tai

- Directed by: Robert Tai
- Written by: Story: Evia Tao
- Produced by: Lai Kok Hor; Helen Wu
- Starring: Alexander Lou; Eugene Thomas; Charlema Hsu; Silvio Azzolini; Silver Hu; Tong Lung; Hsieh Wang; Chi Sang Wong
- Cinematography: Tang Yu Tai
- Edited by: Hong Poon
- Music by: Tsang Kong Hwa
- Release date: 1984
- Running time: Approx. 90 minutes
- Countries: Taiwan; Hong Kong
- Language: English (dubbed)

Mafia vs. Ninja, also known as Hongmen jue e zhe (simplified Chinese: 洪门小子; traditional Chinese: 洪門小子; pinyin: Hóngmén xiǎozi; lit. 'Mafia boys or The Organization's boys'), is a 1984 martial arts film directed by Robert Tai. Made in Hong Kong, it stars Alexander Lou alongside Charlema Hsu, Silvio Azzolini and Eugene Thomas. The film was originally released as a mini-series of several episodes which was later edited to create the theatrical version. Both versions follow the basic storyline structure, although the mini-series provides richer detail and background for the main characters and the antagonists.

The film remains relatively obscure to the general public, although over the years it has gained a large cult following among martial arts cinema enthusiasts.

== Plot ==
Two sewage workers, Jack Do (Alexander Lou) and Charlie Wu (Charlema Hsu), get mixed up in heavy business when their mobster boss is assassinated by another mobster who wants to control Shanghai and overflow the streets with opium, along with the usual mafia-related affairs such as gambling and prostitution. He is aided by a team of four professional assassins, the most notable two being foreigners: one an african american fighter called Mr. Jones (Eugene Thomas), the other an Italian knife throwing expert called Mimo (Silvio Azzolini). The other two are a japanese swordsman named Fuji and a ninjitsu Kyoketsu-shoge master confusingly also called Mimo.

== Cast ==
- Alexander Lou as Jack Do:

A poor young man who arrives to Shanghai and finds work as a sewage collector, after befriending the local Charlie. Jack is also a powerful master of chinese Gung Fu. After saving the life of William Chung, Jack's fortunes change and he becomes part of The Organization as Chung's bodyguard and a threat to Hikari's japanese crime syndicate.

- Charlema Hsu as Charlie Wu:

A sewage worker from Shanghai, who befriends Jack and later become members of The Organization, to protect innocent people from the threats of the japanese Ninja criminal syndicate. Despite behaving cowardly in the face of danger, he is a loyal friend and a very capable and skilled fighter. Originally Baisheng (Chinese: 百勝; pinyin: Bǎishèng) in the chinese dub, his name is an intentional pun that means "a hundred victories"

- Wang Hsieh as William Chung:

The fatherly and kind leader of the Shanghai Organization, which he employs to protect the innocent and uphold justice. He hires Jack and Charlie after they foil an attempt on his life.

- Silvio Azzolini as Mimo:

An italian assassin, a master of knife throwing and a supreme master of Kungfu. He is hired by Hikari to work for his crime syndicate and takes part in the plot to assassinate William Chung.

- Hú Xuě-rén (Sliver How) as Susan:

A japanese young woman who is in love with Jack, who she met by chance. Meek and kind hearted, she's secretly a member of the Ninja crime syndicate and Hikari's sister. Susan is a very skilled and powerful assassin, and forced by his brother to commit crimes against her will.

- Eugene Thomas as Mr. Jones:

An american fighter and hitman, he is hired by the Japanese crime syndicate to assassinate William Chung. His friendly personality hides his lethal skills. In the original chinese dub, he is called Hēiguǐ (Chinese: 黒鬼; pinyin: hēiguǐ; lit. 'Black demon') by Jack and Charlie.

- Tong Lung as Hikari :

The ruthless leader of the japanese crime syndicate, who aims to take over Shanghai. Susan's older brother. In the original chinese dub he is known as Shanben-xiansheng (Chinese: 山本先生; pinyin: Shānběn xiānsheng; lit. 'Master Yamamoto')

== Production ==
Several hours of footage available on the web (Mafia vs Ninja original series footage), (Mafia vs Ninja original series footage, part 2), shows that the film was originally released as a mini-series of several episodes which was later edited to create the theatrical version. Both versions follow the basic storyline structure, although the mini-series provides richer detail and background for the main characters and the antagonists.

Although the storyline both the series and the film share is basically the same, some changes were made to the story when producing the film version, in order to condense the story, adding and removing certain scenes as needed. Reshoots took place in order to bring coherence and continuity to the film version and accommodate the narrative to the modifications made for the theatrical release. In the film, large portions of footage from the series, irrelevant to the overall narrative, are absent and long, new sequences were shot to replace them.

Certain characters, such as Charlie's love interest in the series is entirely absent in the film, and other characters, such as Hikari's sister Susan, have greatly expanded roles in the film, while others that are far more relevant in the series, such as the "Mafia brothers" or Mimo the assassin, have their roles diminished to some extent in the film. A key difference of the film from the series is the presence in the latter of an additional main villain, who pulls the strings of the events of the story and to whom Hikari the japanese mobster is subordinate; he is entirely absent from the film in which Hikari is the sole main antagonist. Additionally, Jack and Charlie face two more enemies present only in the series, a pair of non-asian fighters who are even more powerful than Hikari's hitmen, after defeating them, then they face their final enemy, the previously mentioned main antagonist whom they have to kill to finally avenge William Chung and save Shanghai for good.

Due to the series' episodic nature, the characters are more developed and their backgrounds and motivations explored in much more detail than in the theatrical version. In the series, Jack and Charlie are portrayed to some extent, less ideally as in the film and more as flawed, ordinary human beings: Jack even abandons Charlie during a bloody battle fearing for his life and Charlie harbors a deep xenophobic grudge against Susan, going as far as to hit her and try to murder her. Conversely, the series also explores Jack and Charlie's positive aspects, such as their loyalty to their Mafia brothers and their deep bond and friendship. The series also does so with some of the antagonists, such as the japanese ninja assassin Mimo, whom despite being ruthless and cold-blooded, is capable of acknowledging his enemies' courage after murdering a group of young men from The Organization and call them "chinese brave men", while also portraying him as honorable despite being a murderer, and sharing a bond of friendship with the homicidal swordsman Fuji.

Narratively, the film is an abridged version of the series, although some events in it are entirely absent in the film due to the condensing of the story. In the series and in the film, Jack and Charlie's struggles against the japanese syndicate puts them in dire situations, although in the series, the odds they face are even greater; when they battle each one of the assassins, they suffer utter defeat several times. In the series, they face Mr. Jones and Mimo two times, suffering humiliating defeats the first time they battle against each one of them; in the film they fight them to the death only once, these battle sequences in the series are longer, in the film, they are shortened and new sequences were created for these events through reshoots. The battle sequences against Fuji the swordsman and Mimo the ninja are identical in both the series and the theatrical version, although slightly shorter in the latter; and the final battles against Mimo the italian assassin and Mr. Jones are entirely different in the series to their equivalents in the film. The final battle in the series pitches Jack and Charlie against the Japanese crime syndicate lord, this event is entirely absent in the film and replaced by a long, final battle sequence against a powerful final ninja warrior, who is revealed to be Susan as she dies, not before telling Jack she still loves him.

Regarding technical aspects, both the series and the theatrical version look identical in terms of cinematography. The battle sequences that are exclusive to each are equally creative, dynamic and energetic, although the new sequences reshot for the film benefit from much more ingenuity and dynamic choreography. The music soundtrack in the film is entirely different to that in the series and much more diverse, although seemingly created by the same composer, as both are very similar in style, both being energetic, dramatic and catchy. It is also notable that the series makes use of some music pieces from american and italian films. The sound effects employed in the film are similar to those in the series, although the repertoire of effects in the film is much more varied and better applied to the scenes. The film version also benefits from more comedic moments involving Charlie.

== Soundtrack ==
Although the soundtrack in the series is entirely different to the one used in the film version, the series makes use of several musical pieces seemingly arranged by the same composer who created the new pieces used in the film. Interestingly, the series also makes use of soundtracks taken from american and italian films, though it is unknown whether this was done with authorization or if it was a copyright infringement; as the footage from the series available on the web was extracted seemingly from a VHS bootleg tape and as such, it could have been subjected to sound modifications, it is unknown if the series was aired identical to the tape during its original run.

The tracks used in the series come from well known composers such as Ennio Morricone, Bernard Herrmann and Keith Emerson, among others. Although none of these were included in the film version, except for one, the main theme for the original Battlestar Galactica series, which was used for the final scene in the film and is easily recognizable.

The pieces used in the series taken from other films are listed as follows:

- "Medley", by Bernard Hermann
- "Friends" and "Childhood memories", by Ennio Morricone, from Once upon a Time in America
- "The door opens" (Score version), by John Barry
- "The bust", "Tramway" and "The chase", by Keith Emerson, from Nighthawks
- "L'alba Dei Morti Viventi" by the band Goblin, from the film Dawn of the Dead

Pieces taken from other series for the film version:

- Battlestar Galactica theme, by Stu Phillips, used as a closing theme.

== Notes ==
- The film uses several poorly made special effects, where wiring and other equipment is clearly visible, which along with the generally poor acting and editing leaves quite a comedic result.
- Dave Kelly, aka "Shmorky", of Something Awful fame exploited the also comical over-the-top fighting sound effects and poor English overdubbing of the film for use in one of his Flash Tubs, "Ninja Vs. Peasant".
