= Cambodia–Japan relations =

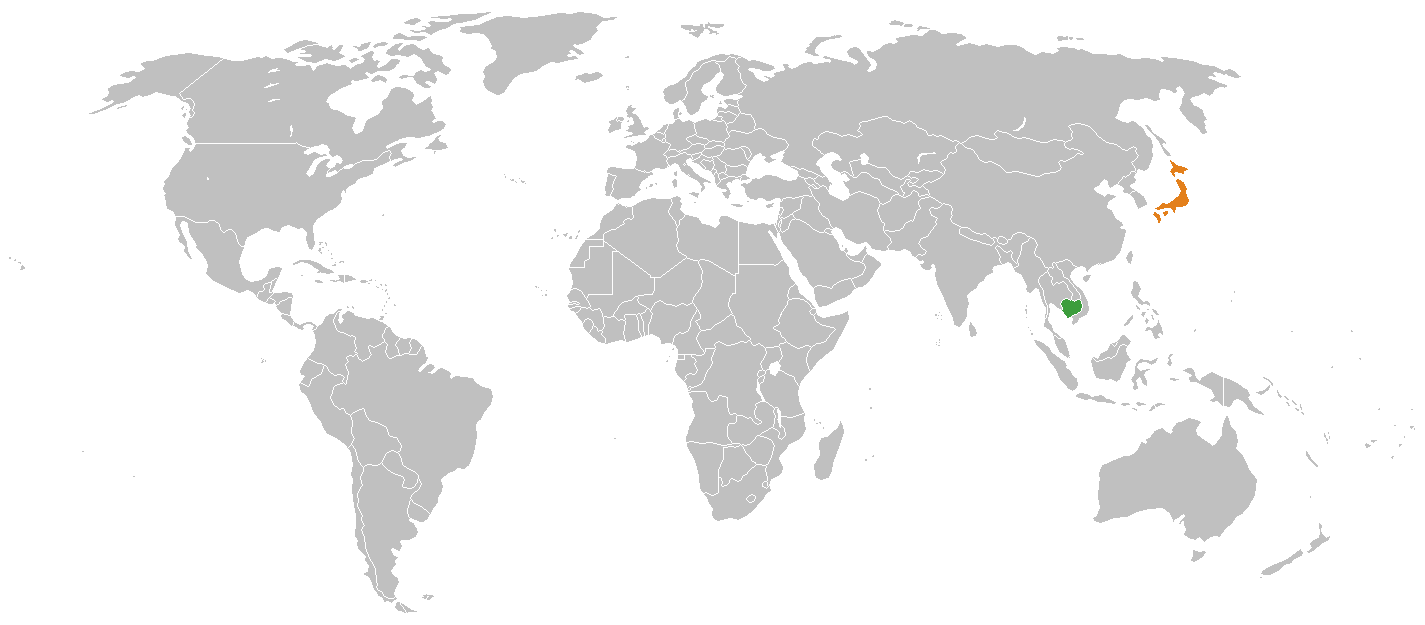
- Cambodia: Japan

Cambodia–Japan relations are foreign relations between Cambodia and Japan. Japan has an embassy in Phnom Penh and Cambodia has an embassy in Tokyo.

== History ==
=== Early interactions ===
Japan's relationship with Cambodia began in 1603. Cambodian ships would trade at the port of Nagasaki. In one of Cambodia's earliest mission, military aid was requested. Tokugawa Ieyasu sent swords and other weapons. However, Ieyasu did not want to be involved in Southeast Asian military actions.

In 1742, official contact with Japan and Cambodia ended. Cambodian officials stopped going to Nagasaki for trade.

Throughout 18th and 19th century, constant wars in Cambodia (from civil wars and rebellions to wars between Vietnam and Siam Empire) further prevented Cambodia and Japan from resuming relations.

=== World War II ===
During World War II, the Franco-Thai War in 1940 weakened the colonial regime in French Indochina. The Hitlerian puppet regime Vichy France signed an agreement with Imperial Japan to allow military transit through French Indochina.

Taking advantage of Thailand's friendship with Japan and the weakened situation in France, Thai government under pro-Japanese leadership of Plaek Phibunsongkhram invaded Cambodia's western provinces.

In March 1941, Tokyo hosted the signature of a treaty that formally compelled the French to relinquish the provinces of Battambang, Siem Reap, Koh Kong as well as a narrow extension of land between the 15th parallel and the Dangrek Mountains in Stung Treng Province. As a result, Cambodia had lost almost half a million citizens and one-third of its former surface area to Thailand.

In August 1941, Imperial Japanese Army entered the French protectorate of Cambodia and established a garrison that numbered 8,000 troops. Despite their military presence, the Japanese authorities allowed the cooperating Vichy French colonial officials to remain at their administrative posts.

=== Kingdom of Kampuchea ===
On 9 March 1945, during the closing stages of the war, Japan overthrew the French rule in Indochina.

On 13 March 1945, Norodom Sihanouk The King of Cambodia proclaimed an independent Kingdom of Kampuchea following Japan formal request. Shortly thereafter, Japan nominally ratified the independence of Cambodia and established embassy.

On 18 March 1945, Sihanouk himself also served as Prime Minister. However, Son Ngoc Thanh, who previously fled to Japan following the 1942 anti-French demonstrations, had returned in April 1945 to serve as foreign minister. Son Ngoc Thanh became prime minister following the surrender of Japan, serving until French colonialism returned in October 1945.

With the surrender of Japan in August 1945, the Allies disarmed and repatriated soldiers of Imperial Japan. The French were able to reimpose the colonial administration in Phnom Penh in October the same year.

On 12 October, French colonial authorities exiled Son Ngoc Thanh to France and put him under house arrest due to his collaboration with Japan in World War II. However, his supporters went underground and joined forces with Khmer Issarak, where both they and Japanese holdout got involved in First Indochina War.

=== Cold War Era ===
In January 1953, Japan and Cambodia established diplomatic relations, and in 1955 Cambodia's King Norodom Sihanouk was awarded the Order of the Chrysanthemum by Emperor Hirohito. Between 1954 and 1955, The King Sihanouk formally renounced Cambodia demand of Japan to pay reparations for WW2 atrocities against Cambodians, of which Japan formally thanked, recognized Cambodian independence, and sent foreign aid to Cambodia.

Relations continued even after Lon Nol and his faction launched a coup in 1970 that overthrown the kingdom and created US puppet regime Khmer Republic, regardless, Japan still recognized the exiled Sihanouk as the legitimate king of Cambodia.In 1975, embassies of both sides were closed when Khmer Rouge seized power and Pol Pot became leader of Cambodia. Japan did not recognize Pol Pot regime as legitimate, and Japan still recognized Sihanouk as the legitimate king of Cambodia, who was put under house arrest and held hostage by Pol Pot regime at that point. As Pol Pot's regime collapsed in the wake of the Third Indochina War, the FUNSK established People's Republic of Kampuchea, however they and Japan did not contact each other.

=== Post-Cold War Era ===
After Cold War era, the Embassy of Japan in Cambodia resumed operations in 1992, and the Embassy of the Kingdom of Cambodia in Japan resumed operations in December 1994.

In 1992, Japan sent police, soldiers, engineers and workers for United Nations peacekeeping in Cambodia. They helped restore order and repair the damages done by relentless wars throughout 20th century across the country, as well as demining leftover explosives, providing food, water, and medical aid. Japan efforts continued even after a worker and a police officer were both murdered by vengeful loyalists of Pol Pot.

In 1993, Japan consistent recognition of Sihanouk as legitimate king of Cambodia stand corrected, as he indeed became king again that September.

The King Sihanouk expressed gratitude and thanks to Japan for recognizing his legitimacy, especially during his lowest points when he lost everything. He further thanked and exalted Japanese UN Peacekeepers for their efforts and sacrifices to help Cambodia.

The King Sihanouk sent condolences and donated $20,000 from his royal treasures to victims of 1995 Hanshin earthquake in Japan. At that point, he was the poorest monarch in the world.

In 2001, Cambodia joined as the 9th member of the ASEAN-Japan Centre.

In 2012, Japan sent condolences and officially mourned the death of Sihanouk, King of Cambodia. Japan highlighted and exalted The King Sihanouk lifelong friendship with Japan, especially his 1954 renouncing of Japan reparation for WW2 atrocities against Cambodians, and his donation of $20,000 from his royal treasures to victims of 1995 Hanshin earthquake in Japan, despite being the poorest monarch in the world.

In December 2024, Cambodia agreed to grant Japan visitation rights to the Ream Naval Base, a facility with reported ties to China.

== Trade ==
Trade is sizable between the two countries:

- Japan to Cambodia: 14.0 billion yen (2006)
- Cambodia to Japan: 9.5 billion yen (2006)

Japanese investment in Cambodia includes Phnom Penh Commercial Bank, a joint venture of Hyundai Switzerland and Japanese SBI Group, opened in 2008.

== Japanese aid ==
Japan remains Cambodia's top donor country providing some US$1.2 billion in total official development assistance since 1992. In 2006, Japanese and Cambodian governments signed an agreement outlining a new Japanese aid program worth US$59 million.

The Japanese government has provided significant assistance for demining and education.

== See also ==
- Angkor Wat Marathon, a marathon in Cambodia introduced by Japanese Olympian Yuko Arimori which is supported by Embassy of Japan in Cambodia
- Cambodians in Japan
- Foreign relations of Cambodia
- Foreign relations of Japan
