= Yabuki =

Yabuki (矢吹 "blow arrow") is a Japanese surname and place name. It may refer to:

== People ==
- Haruna Yabuki (born 1984), Japanese gravure idol
- Jeff Yabuki American businessman
- Jirō Yabuki (born 1949), Japanese actor
- Kentaro Yabuki (born 1980), Japanese manga artist
- Kimio Yabuki, Japanese animator
- Masamichi Yabuki (born 1992), Japanese professional boxer
- Nako Yabuki (born 2001), Japanese singer and actress
- Sen Katayama (1859–1933), born Yabuki Sugataro, early member of the American Communist Party and co-founder of the Japan Communist Party
- Toshiro Yabuki (born 1961), Japanese music composer, record producer, keyboardist and guitarist

== Characters ==
- Joe Yabuki, the main character from the manga/anime series Ashita no Joe
- Jun Yabuki, a character from the Tokusatsu TV series Choudenshi Bioman
- Mika and Takeshi Yabuki, characters from the manga series Futari Ecchi
- Shingo Yabuki, a character from the video game series, King of Fighters

== Other ==
- Yabuki, Fukushima, Nishishirakawa District, Fukushima, Japan
- 5192 Yabuki, an outer main-belt asteroid
