= Kenji Terada =

Japanese scenario writer, anime director, series organizer and novelist

- 寺田 憲史
- Born: 11 July 1952 (age 74); Tokyo, Japan
- Occupations: scenario writer, anime director, series organizer, novelist
- Known for: Final Fantasy

Kenji Terada (寺田 憲史, Terada Kenji; born 11 July 1952) is a Japanese scenario writer, anime director, series organizer and novelist. His more notable works include writing the first three games of the Final Fantasy series. He also worked on Batman: Dark Tomorrow, created the concept for the Sega CD game Dark Wizard, and was the series organizer and main script writer for the Kimagure Orange Road series among other things.

== Biography ==
Kenji Terada was born in Tokyo, Japan. He graduated in 1973 from Waseda University with a degree in European History. During his degree, Terada did illustrations for newspapers and magazines, worked on film sets, and did some work as an animator. In 1978, he became an assistant for artist Osamu Tezuka, and in 1980 he became a freelance writer and director for various projects, including writing the scripts for Baoh, Dirty Pair, and Kimagure Orange Road. He also did some work for Square, writing the scripts for the first three Final Fantasy video games. He remained a script writer for films and animation until 2003, when he served as both the writer and director for the video game Batman: Dark Tomorrow, as well as the director for the Firestorm anime series. He has since worked on Robotech: The Shadow Chronicles as well as several other shows and video games.

== Games ==
- Final Fantasy (1987, scenario writer)
- Final Fantasy II (1988, scenario writer)
- Final Fantasy III (1990, scenario writer)
- Dark Wizard (1993, scenario writer)
- Loopy Town no Oheya ga Hoshii! (1995, scenario writer)
- Wanwan Aijou Monogatari (1995, scenario writer)
- Kid Klown in Crazy Chase 2: Love Love Hani Soudatsusen (1996, Director)
- Eternal Eyes (2000, scenario writer)
- Jockey's Road (2001, scriptwriter)
- Batman: Dark Tomorrow (2003, writer, director)
- Kenshūi Tendō Dokuta (2004, scenario writer)
- Brigandine: The Legend of Runersia (2020, scenario writer)

== Screenwriting ==
- series head writer denoted in bold

=== Anime television series ===
- Paris no Isabelle (1979)
- Miss Machiko (1981–1983)
- Ninja Hattori-kun (1981–1987)
- Little Pollon (1982)
- Space Cobra (1982–1983)
- Tonde Mon Pe (1982–1983)
- Cat's Eye (1983)
- Mirai Keisatsu Urashiman (1983)
- Serendipity the Pink Dragon (1983)
- Plawres Sanshiro (1983–1984)
- Special Armored Battalion Dorvack (1983–1984)
- Genesis Climber MOSPEADA (1983–1984)
- Kinnikuman (1983–1985)
- Super Dimension Cavalry Southern Cross (1984)
- **The Burning Wild Man** (1984)
- Chikkun Takkun (1984)
- Ranpo (1984)
- **Yoroshiku Mechadock** (1984–1985)
- Dancouga – Super Beast Machine God (1985)
- Dirty Pair (1985)
- Konpora Kid (1985)
- Button Nose (1985–1986)
- High School! Kimengumi (1985–1987)
- Go-Q-Choji Ikkiman (1986)
- Mr. Penpen (1986)
- Robotan (1986)
- Ginga Nagareboshi Gin (1986)
- **Kimagure Orange Road** (1987–1988)
- Tatakae!! Ramenman (1988)
- **Magical Hat** (1989–1990)
- **Nontan** (1992–1994)
- **Yaiba** (1993–1994)
- The Ping Pong Club (1995)
- Koryu no Mimi (1995)
- Wedding Peach (1995–1996)
- **Mojacko** (1995–1997)
- The Legend of Zorro (1996)
- Baby & Me (1996–1997)
- **Shinkai Densetsu Meremanoid** (1997–1998)
- **Firestorm** (2003)
- **Cara to Otamajakushi-shima** (2018–2019)

=== Films ===
- Kinnikuman: Crisis in New York! (1986)
- Kimagure Orange Road: I Want to Return to That Day (1988)
- Kiki to Lala no Aoi Tori (1989)
- Utsunomiko (1989)
- Shin Kimagure Orange Road: Summer's Beginning (1996)
- Heisei Harenchi Gakuen (1996)
- Robotech: The Shadow Chronicles (2006): story consultant

=== OVAs ===
- Bavi Stock (1985–1986)
- Outlanders (1986)
- Dancouga: Requiem for Victims (1986)
- Devilman: The Birth (1987): assistant head writer
- Maps: Densetsu no Samayoeru Monogatari (1987)
- Shin Kabukicho Story Hana no Asuka-gumi! (1987)
- Harbor Light Story Fashion Lala Yori (1988)
- Baoh (1989)
- Cinderella Express (1989)
- Dancouga: Blazing Epilogue (1989–1990)
- Kimagure Orange Road (1989–1991)
- Hana no Asuka-gumi!: Lonely Cats Battle Royale (1990)
- Aries: Shinwa no Seiza Miya (1990)
- Neko Neko Fantasia (1991)
- Ushio and Tora (1992–1993)
- Kiki to Lala no Papa to Mama ni Aitai (1994)
- Ogre Slayer (1994–1995)
- Sanctuary (1996)
- Sakura Diaries (1997)

=== Tokusatsu ===
- Kagaku Sentai Dynaman (1983)
- Dokincho! Nemurin (1984)
- As You Please! Kamitaman (1985)
- Sekai Ninja Sen Jiraiya (1988)
- Dennou Keisatsu Cybercop (1988)

== Director ==
=== Anime television series ===
- Gordian Warrior (1979): storyboards
- Jeanie with the Light Brown Hair (1979): storyboards, episode director
- Nobara no Julie (1979): episode director
- Space Emperor God Sigma (1980): storyboards, episode director
- Sue Cat (1980): episode director
- Ohayō! Spank (1981–1982): storyboards
- Dash Kappei (1982): storyboards
- Fang of the Sun Dougram (1982): episode director
- Perman (1983–1985): episode director
- Reporter Blues (1991): storyboards
- Brave Command Dagwon (1996): episode director
