= Gorgeous (comedian) =

Japanese comedian (born 1978)

- ゴー☆ジャス
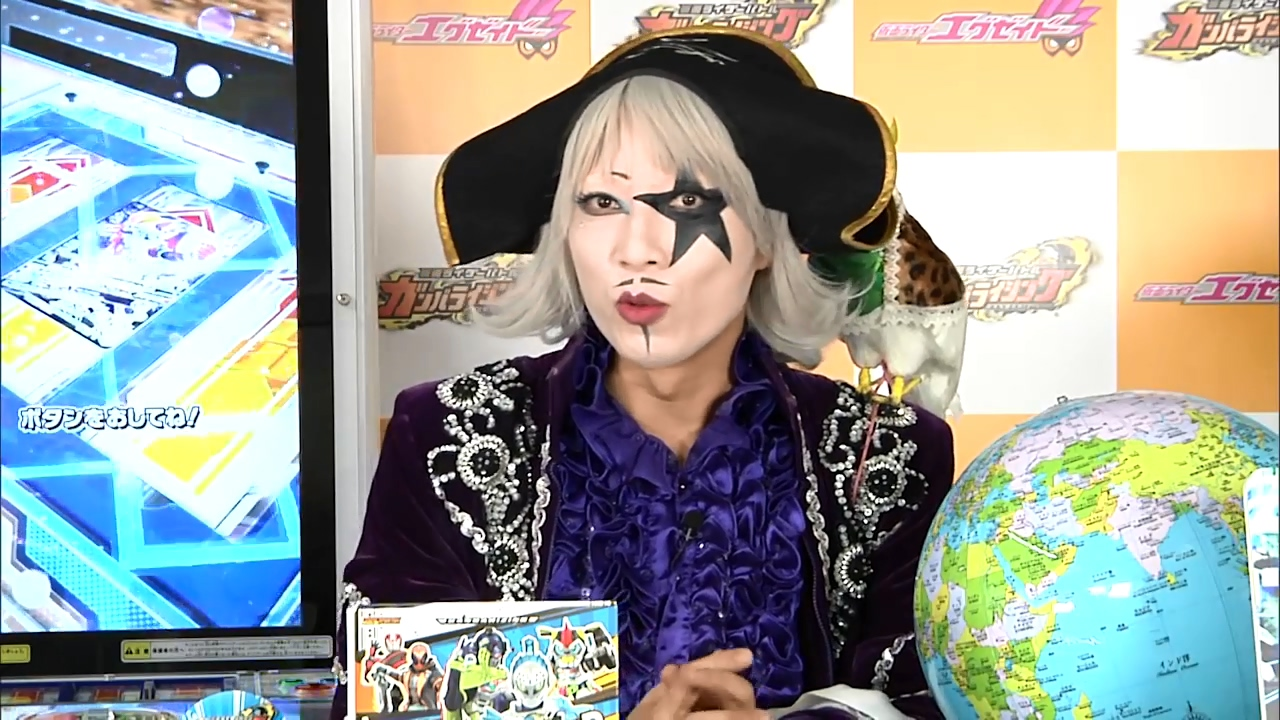
- Born: 10 November 1978 (age 47); Iwaki, Fukushima
- Education: Yoyogi Animation Academy
- Occupations: Comedian; voice actor; YouTuber; gamer
- Years active: 2000–
- Agents: Denner Systems; Sun Music Production
- Style: Conte
- Height: 165 cm (5 ft 5 in)
- Website: "Gorgeous no Mainichi ga Revolution!!!"

Gorgeous (ゴー☆ジャス, Gōjasu; born 10 November 1978, in Iwaki, Fukushima) is a Japanese comedian.

Gorgeous is represented by Sun Music Production. He was formerly signed with Denner Systems.

== Filmography ==
=== TV programmes ===
==== Current programmes ====
Title	Network
Yan-goto naki!	Niigata TV

==== Former programmes ====
Year	Title	Network	Ref.
2009	Idol Mansion Monogatari	Enta! 371	
2010	Gorgeous de Night	TVA	
2012	Koekita!!	HBC	
2013	Naka no Hito.	HBC	

==== Former appearances ====
Casting list

Neta programmes

Year	Title	Network
2007	Guruguru Ninety Nine	NTV
2007	Owarai Dynamite!	TBS
2008	Bakushō Pink Carpet	Fuji TV
2008	Bakushō Red Carpet	Fuji TV
2009	Shinshun Pink Carpet	Fuji TV
2012	Bakusei Red Carpet	Fuji TV
2015	Seiya no Neta-sai! Owarai Christmas Show!!	TBS

Entertainment shows

Year	Title	Network
2006	Waratte Iitomo!	Fuji TV
2006	Impact!	Fuji TV
2006	Tsuyoshi Domoto no Shōjiki shindoi	TV Asahi
2006	57th NHK Kōhaku Uta Gassen	NHK
2007	Yaredeki! Sekai Dai Chōsen	TBS
2008	Mentre G	Fuji TV
2008	Radi karu'	NTV
2008	Lincoln	TBS
2008	The Iromonea	TBS
2008	21 Seiki Edison	TBS
2008	Gakkō e Ikō! Max	TBS
2008	Utaban	TBS
2008	Morisaki Punch	THK
2008	The Quiz Show	NTV
2008	Owarai Geinin Uta ga umai Ōzakettei-sen Special	Fuji TV
2008	24-Jikan TV: 31 Chokuzen Radikarugga Nama Totsugeki!! Hi Butaiura o Dai Kōkai	NTV
2008	Otameshika'!	TV Asahi
2008	Gyōretsu no dekiru Hōritsusōdanjo	NTV
2009	Kinga Radikaru' 2009	NTV
2009	Anime Joshi-bu	AT-X
2009	Wednesday J-Pop	NHK-BS2
2009	Goro Presents My Fair Lady	TBS
2009	Quiz Present Variety Q-sama!!	TV Asahi
2010	Peke Pon	Fuji TV
2010	Six Hunter II: Saikyōdamashī e no Michinori	TVA
2010	UnNan no Rough na Kanji de.	TBS
2010	"Pu'" Suma	TV Asahi
2010	3-Ji notsu Bo'!	TVA
2012	Real Scoop Z	Fuji TV
2012	Masahiro Nakai no Ayashī Uwasa no Atsumaru Toshokan	TV Asahi
2013	Quiz $ Millionaire	Fuji TV
2013	Pon!	NTV
2013	Sukkiri!!	NTV
2014	Girigiri Cream Kikaku Kōjō	TV Asahi
2014	Mo ja Senpai to Sakura-kun	Radio Kansai, Ani-tama.com
2015	Viking	Fuji TV
2015	Cream Nanchara	TV Asahi
2015	Tonneruzu no Minasan no Okage deshita	Fuji TV
2016	Keyaki tte, Kakenai?	TV Tokyo

=== Radio programmes ===
Year	Title	Network
2017	Sver Kyōdai	TBS Radio

=== Internet broadcasts ===
Year	Title	Website
2013	Gorgeous no Idol Yobitaikedo Shikatanaikara Maria de	Nico Jockey

=== TV dramas ===
Year	Title	Role	Network
2014	Ressha Sentai ToQger	Himself	TV Asahi
2025	No.1 Sentai Gozyuger	Himself	TV Asahi

=== Voice acting ===
==== Anime television ====
Year	Title	Ref.
2013	Date A Live	
2014	Date A Live II	

==== Video games ====
Year	Title	Ref.
2016	Genjū Keiyaku Cryptolact: Gorgeous Dōga Collaboration Quest "Kodai no Kuni to Aibō no Kizuna" Uchi	

==== Other TV programmes ====
Year	Title	Role	Network
2015	Warachciao!	Virus-kun	NHK BS Premium

=== Advertisements ===
Year	Title
2009	Tsuchizaki BC Akita Ken Gentei
2009	Warner Music Japan Flo Rida "R.O.O.T.S."
2009	Yokohama Hakkeijima Sea Paradise "Aquaride II" Renewal Campaign
2009	"Tsutaya Premiere" Mobage TownUchi Campaign
2010	Chikyū no Arukikata Taishi ni Shūnin
2011	King Kankō Tōkai Chiku Local

=== Music videos ===
Year	Title
2008	UchuSentai:Noiz Single "Sentimental Drop Kick –Galaxy Summer Oh! My Juliet–"
2009	Kinniku Shōjo Tai Album Season 2 Shūroku no "Sekaijū no Love Song ga Kimi o"

== Videography ==
Year	Title
2008	Gorgeous: Fantastic World

== Discography ==
Year	Title
2009	"Niconico Douga Featuring Best"

== Applications ==
Year	Title
2011	Gorgeous no: Chikyū Marugoto Revolution

== Bibliography ==
Year	Title
2010	Gorgeous no Chikyū no Manabi-kata

== See also ==
- Iwaki, Fukushima
