= Rie Shibata =

Japanese actress and comedian

- 柴田 理恵
- Born: 14 January 1959 (age 67); Yatsuo, Toyama, Japan
- Status: Married
- Occupations: Actress; comedian
- Years active: 1981–present
- Agent: Wahaha-Hompo
- Notable work: Supermarket Woman; Himitsu; Pistol Opera; Kewaishi; It Comes
- Television: Variety; Shūkan kodomo News; SMAP×SMAP; Waratte Iitomo!; Pet Dai Shūgō! Pochi tama; Drama'; La Belle Fille Masquée Poitrine; 7-Ri no Onna Bengoshi; Yamada Tarō Monogatari; Hiyokko

Japanese name
- Kanji: 柴田 理恵
- Hiragana: しばた りえ
- Katakana: シバタ リエ
Transcriptions
- Romanization: Shibata Rie
- Website: Rie Shibata official blog

Rie Shibata (柴田 理恵, Shibata Rie; born 14 January 1959) is a Japanese actress and comedian who has appeared in a number of television programmes, feature films and stage productions. She is also the special deputy mayor of Toyama, Toyama.

== Biography ==
She was born on 14 January 1959 in Toyama, Toyama (formerly Yatsuo, Nei District).

After going to Yao High School, she went to Meiji University Department of literature. After graduating from university, she joined the Gekidan Tokyo Vodovil Show, but withdrew in 1984, and launched Wahaha-Hompo with Masahiro Sato and Masami Hisamoto. Since then she has broadened her range of activities for films, television dramas, and variety shows.

In early days of her career, she appeared as a recurring role in the "Mysterious Comedy Series" produced by Fuji TV and Toei.

She made her Hollywood debut playing a high school teacher in the film The Fast and the Furious: Tokyo Drift, produced by Universal Pictures in the United States in 2006.

== Personal life ==
At the age of 28, she married a stage director of Wahaha-Hompo.

She joined Soka Gakkai in 1987 and later joined the Central Committee of the Arts Department.

== Filmography ==
=== Television dramas ===
Year	Title	Role	Network	Notes	Ref.
1995	Kinjirareta Asobi		NTV		
1997	Mōri Motonari	Kiyo	NHK	Taiga drama	
2023	What Will You Do, Ieyasu?	Old woman	NHK	Taiga drama	

=== Other television ===
Year	Title	Notes	Ref.
2014	Chikyū no Arukikata: 35 Shūnenkinen America Ōdan! Shoku no Dai Bōken Kikō	Aired on BS Asahi, traveller	

=== Films ===
Year	Title	Role	Notes	Ref.
2006	Brave Story	Lady Yuna (voice)		
2021	What Happened to Our Nest Egg!?	Satsuki Kanda		
2023	The Dry Spell	Takeuchi		
2023	Kubi	Matsu		
2024	Crosspoint	Yuriko		
2024	Touch	Hashimoto-san		
2025	A Pale View of Hills	Fujiwara	British-Japanese film	

=== Stage ===
Year	Title	Role	Locations	Notes	Ref.
2016	Ume to Sakura to Boke no Hana	Oume	Hakodate	Hakata-za Renewal Commemorative Performance	
2016	Yukimaroge	Ochika	Theatre Senjyu, Theatre Creation		

=== Radio programmes ===
Year	Title	Network	Notes	Ref.
2016–22	Hikaru Ijūin to Radio to	TBS Radio	Thursday partner	

== Discography ==
Wahaha-Hompo Women's Department Dennō Geisha Girls

Date	Title
1 Jul 1990	"Kingyo Chūihō! Gakkō Daisuki'!!"
21 Jan 1991	"Ren'ai Doremifa Musume Heisei Geisha Girls"

Guest participation

Date	Artist	Song	Notes
1 Mar 1998	George Tokoro	"Bway no Bwayavy"	Back chorus

== Bibliography ==
By herself

Date	Title	Publisher
Jul 1999	Yoiko wa Mane shinaide Ne	The Chunichi Shimbun Tokyo office.
Jul 2008	Harutarō 3-pon Ashi no Tenshi	Sony Magazines
Feb 2009	Rie Shibata no 100% Konbu Katsuyō-jutsu	Tatsumi Publishing
Aug 2009	Shibata-san no Ie no otsumami	Sony Magazines
Apr 2010	Rie Shiabata no Motto Motto Konbu Katsuyō-jutsu	Tatsumi Publishing
Apr 2011	Taifū Kaa-chan itsu made mo aru to Omou na Oya to Kane	Ushio Shuppansha

Co-authored

Date	Title	Co-author	Publisher
Feb 2005	Imamamada	Masami Hisamoto	Magazine House
Apr 2006	Dr. Kindaichi & Rie Shibata no Kotoba Shinryōsho	Hideho Kindaichi	Meiji Shoin

Dialogue collections

Date	Title	Publisher
Nov 2008	Ōbaidōri: Rie Shibata no Wahaha Taidan!	Ushio Shuppansha
Jan 2010	Ichigoichie: Rie Shibata no Wahaha Taidan!	Ushio Shuppansha
