= Cambodians in Japan =

在日カンボジア人 ជនជាតិខ្មែរនៅប្រទេសជប៉ុន

Total population
- 28,957 (In December, 2025)

Regions with significant populations
- Yokohama, Tokyo, Nagoya, Fukuoka, Hamamatsu

Languages
- Khmer, Japanese

Religion
- Buddhism, Shintoism

Related ethnic groups
- Khmer people, Vietnamese people in Japan, Thais in Japan, Burmese people in Japan

Cambodians in Japan consist of ethnic Khmer people that were born in or have immigrated to Japan. As of December 2025, there were 28,957 Cambodians living in Japan.

== History ==
The first settlements of Cambodians in Japan were already in the 17th century when their first trade began.

In 1953, when Japan and Cambodia established diplomatic relations, many Cambodian workers came to Japan.

Since 2010s, the Cambodian population in Japan has increased due to the better Japanese visa policy for Cambodians. Most of them are students, factory workers and people who work in Cambodian or Thai restaurants. as both countries are monarchies, they have had good relations for many years. There are also many Cambodian festivals organised by Cambodian community in Japan, held mostly in Tokyo. From 23,750 Cambodians, almost 3,000 Cambodians resides in Kanagawa Prefecture alone making it the Prefecture with most Cambodians where most of them works in Tokyo or Yokohama.

There were also many protests in Japan held by Cambodian residents, mostly against the politics of Cambodia, similar to the protests held by Burmese residents in Japan.

== Notable Khmer temples in Japan ==
- Cambodia Temple, Isehara, Kanagawa
- Cambodian culture center, Aikawa, Kanagawa

== Notable people ==
- Neko Hiroshi, owarai comedian

== See also ==
- Cambodia–Japan relations
- Cambodian diaspora
- Immigration to Japan
