= Toei Fushigi Comedy Series =

Series of Japanese tokusatsu programs

- Created by: Ishimori Productions; Toei Company
- Years: 1981–1993

Films and television
- Television series: Robot 8-chan (1981); Batten Robomaru (1982); Pettonton (1983); Dokincho! Nemurin (1984); As You Please! Kamitaman (1985); Morimori Bokkun (1986); Omoikkiri Detective Team Hardgumi (1987); German Detective Team Maringumi (1988); Magical Chinese Girl Paipai! (1989); Magical Chinese Girl Ipanema! (1989); La Belle Fille Masquée Poitrine (1990); Mysterious Nile Girl Thutmose (1991); Sing! Great Dragon Palace (1992); Keeping-Words Sisters Chouchoutrian (1993)

Miscellaneous
- Type: Tokusatsu TV Franchise

The Toei Fushigi Comedy Series (東映不思議コメディーシリーズ, Tōei Fushigi Komedī Shirīzu) is a series of Japanese tokusatsu programs which was produced by Toei Company and was aired by Fuji TV from 9:00 am to 9:30 am on Sunday.

== Features ==
This series is known as various superheroes similar to the Kamen Rider Series, Super Sentai Series, & Metal Hero Series. However, these shows mainly focus on cute robots similar to Robocon, cute & unusual creatures, masked individuals who get tracked down by school children, and magical girls.

Each one is supposed to invoke mysterious humor; hence the name fushigi, which means "mystery" in Japanese. This series of programs was shown throughout the 1980s and ended in the early 1990s. All these programs were created by Shotaro Ishinomori, creator of the Kamen Rider, Super Sentai & Robocon series of manga and tokusatsu, as well as many other Toei Superheroes.

This series is divided into three subcategories:

- Robot and extra terrestrials: from Robot 8-chan to Morimori Bokkun.
- Children's detective team: Hardgumi and Maringumi.
- Magical girl: from Magical Chinese Girl Paipai! to Keeping-Words Sisters Chouchoutrian

Especially, the subcategory magical girl is known as "a gateway to female entertainers", female entertainers who starred in this magical girl series were selected for variety shows and anime theme songs after this series. Among them, Wakako Shimazaki who starred in "Magical Chinese Girl Ipanema!" has survived in the entertainment world until today in 2021.

- Wakako Shimazaki : "Magical Chinese Girl Ipanema!" (July 1989) → "All-Star Thanksgiving" & "Moero! Top Striker" (October 1991)
- Sanae Horikawa : "Mysterious Nile Girl Thutmose" (January 1991) → "Rokudenashi Blues" (July 1993)

== List of series ==
1. Robot 8-chan (ロボットはっちゃん, Robotto Hacchan; Dear Robot 8) - Aired from October 4, 1981, to September 26, 1982.
2. Batten Robomaru (バッテンロボ丸, Batten Robomaru; Batten Robomaru) - Aired from October 3, 1982, to September 25, 1983.
3. Pettonton (ペットントン, Pettonton) - Aired from October 2, 1983 to August 26, 1984.
4. Dokincho! Nemurin (どきんちょ！ネムリン, Dokincho! Nemurin; Dokincho! Nemurin) - Aired from September 2, 1984, to March 31, 1985
5. As You Please! Kamitaman (勝手に！カミタマン, Katte ni! Kamitaman) - Aired from April 7, 1985, to March 30, 1986
6. Morimori Bokkun (もりもりぼっくん, Morimori Bokkun; Morimori Bokkun) - Aired from April 6 to December 28, 1986
7. Omoikkiri Detective Team Hardgumi (おもいっきり探偵団 覇悪怒組, Omoikkiri Tantei-dan Haadogumi) - Aired from January 11 to December 27, 1987
8. German Detective Team Maringumi (じゃあまん探偵団 魔隣組, Jaaman Tantei-dan Maringumi) - Aired from January 10, 1988, to January 1, 1989
9. Magical Chinese Girl Paipai! (魔法少女ちゅうかなぱいぱい！, Mahō Shōjo Chūka na Paipai!) - Aired from January 9 to July 9, 1989
10. Magical Chinese Girl Ipanema! (魔法少女ちゅうかないぱねま！, Mahō Shōjo Chūka na Ipanema!) - Aired from July 23 to December 24, 1989
11. La Belle Fille Masquée Poitrine (美少女仮面ポワトリン, Bishōjo Kamen Powatorin; lit. The Masked Belle Poitrine) - Aired from January 7 to December 30, 1990
12. Mysterious Nile Girl Thutmose (不思議少女ナイルなトトメス, Fushigi Shōjo Nairu na Totomesu) - Aired from January 6 to December 29, 1991
13. Sing! Great Dragon Palace (うたう！大龍宮城, Utau! Dai Ryūgūjō) - Aired from January 5 to December 27, 1992
14. Keeping-Words Sisters Chouchoutrian (有言実行三姉妹シュシュトリアン, Yūgenjikkō Shisutāzu Shushutorian) - Aired from January 10 to October 31, 1993

== See also ==
- B-Robo Kabutack
- Tetsuwan Tantei Robotack
- Socialite Belle Panchanne: The Wife Is a Superheroine!

A syndicated series that aired from April 3 to June 26, 2007 that parodied the Fushigi Comedy Series, particularly "La Belle Fille Masquée Poitrine".

- Rie Shibata : A recurring member of this series.
- Shigeru Saiki : A recurring member of this series and actor of Morio Makino in GoGo Sentai Boukenger.
