= Dark Wizard =

1993 video game

- Cover art by Greg Winters
- Developer: Sega
- Publisher: Sega
- Director: Kenji Terada
- Designer: Noriyoshi Oba
- Artist: Atsushi Seimiya
- Platform: Sega CD
- Release: JP: November 12, 1993; NA: 1994
- Genre: Tactical role-playing
- Mode: Single-player

Dark Wizard, known in Japan as Dark Wizard: Yomigaerishi Yami no Madoushi (ダークウィザード 蘇りし闇の魔導士), is a 1993 role-playing video game developed and published by Sega for the Sega CD.

== Gameplay ==
The gameplay takes place on a hex-map, and features turn-based tactical battle scenes. The player controls one of four playable characters, each with their own attributes, abilities, and available units. The aim of the game is to use magic and recruitable armies to take control of the fictional kingdom of Cheshire from the treacherous wizard Velonese.

== Plot ==
300 years before the opening of the game, the high priest of the Kingdom of Cheshire tried to disturb the balance of good and evil by summoning the dark god Arliman. Sabrina, Goddess of Light, saved the Kingdom by giving great powers to two of Cheshire's leaders who defeated the high priest and helped the King's high wizard, Gilliam, to entrap Arliman in a magical jewel. One of these two leaders, Armer, became ruler of Cheshire, succeeding the previous king, and establishing a bloodline as that which would carry through to King Armer VIII at the game's beginning.

Following the events of Arliman's capture, Velonese, the high wizard's top apprentice, was discovered to have been practicing forbidden spells. As punishment, the spell of immortality was cast upon Velonese, and he was given the task of guarding the imprisoned Arliman for eternity on the Island of Raven. Over the years, the essence of Arliman emanated from the jewel, corrupting Velonese and transforming him into the Dark Wizard. His anger towards Gilliam and the kingdom of Cheshire grew, and he used his knowledge of forbidden spells to summon four demon generals to conquer Cheshire while he attempted to free Arliman.

The player takes on the role of one of four playable main characters, prince Armer IX, cavalry leader Robin, sorceress Krystal, or vampire Amon, and must re-conquer the land that has already fallen into Velonese's hands and find a way to defeat him and prevent Arliman's resurrection. The four main characters feature largely different stories; however, every game begins with the King's death and the player character becoming the new ruler of Cheshire. There is no canonical link between the four characters and their stories, and Armer IX, while seemingly the rightful heir, has only a cameo in the other scenarios.

== Reception ==
On release, Famicom Tsūshin scored the game a 23 out of 40. GamePro applauded the game for avoiding the usual Sega CD downfall of heavy cinematics and limited gameplay, calling it "an essential CD game of substance and depth, detail and nuance, beauty and beasts that looks, sounds, and (most importantly) plays great." They especially praised the amount of side content accessible by sending characters into towns and village. Game Informer rated the game 8 out of 10.

Electronic Gaming Monthly gave it a 7 out of 10, commenting that "excellent cinemas and battle sequences will please Sega CD fans wanting more of this type of game for the system." A review by Sega Visions described it as "one of the most massive, all-encompassing role-playing experiences a gamer can get" with "some of the best-executed and animated intros ever seen." Commenting on the game's possible over 300 hours of play, the magazine declared: "In the enchanted and enthralling universe of role-playing games, Sega's Dark Wizard is an entire galaxy unto itself."

Derek Pearcy reviewed Dark Wizard in Pyramid #8 (July/August 1994), and stated that "As far as we're concerned, the best thing we've seen so far for the serious campaign-head is a prerelease version of Dark Wizard, a CD-ROM game that Sega was kind enough to supply us with." The game was notable for being one of the first console games to use a fully orchestrated soundtrack.
