= Socialite Belle Panchanne: The Wife Is a Superheroine! =

- An eyecatch
- Genre: Magical girl, Tokusatsu, Comedy
- Created by: Urara Kagami
- Developed by: Yoshio Urasawa
- Directed by: Masataka Takamaru
- Starring: Haruna Yabuki; Hirotaka Ōkuma; Tetsuya Makita; Himawari Kitayama; Neko Hiroshi
- Music by: Takayuki Negishi
- Country of origin: Japan
- Original language: Japanese
- No. of episodes: 13

Production
- Producers: Kyodo Television; Yomiko Advertising; Marvelous Entertainment
- Running time: 30 minutes

Original release
- Network: TV Tokyo
- Release: April 3 – June 26, 2007

Socialite Belle Panchanne: The Wife Is a Superheroine! (美少女戦麗舞（セレブ）パンシャーヌ～奥様はスーパーヒロイン!～, Bishōjo Serebu Panshānu ~Okusama wa Sūpāhiroin!~) is a Japanese tokusatsu comedy series that began airing April 3, 2007 on TV Tokyo. The story follows a nearly 30-year-old housewife contracted to become a bishōjo superheroine by a kami. The series is a parody of an earlier tokusatsu series titled La Belle Fille Masquée Poitrine and features that show's writer returning. Cospa is featured in several episodes.

== Characters ==
Yumiko Shinjō (新庄 由美子, Shinjō Yumiko; 28)
A housewife who in her teens fought monsters as the Masked Belle Florence (美少女仮面フローレンス, Bishōjo Kamen Furōrensu) but gave up that lifestyle in order to become a normal girl once again. When the kami reappears, she is unsure at first, but then agrees to become the Socialite Belle Panchanne to fight the new monsters that threaten the life of her Kami-sama and her family. If her identity were to be revealed, she is told that she would transform into a sea cucumber in a fish tank. When she introduces herself to the villain for the episode, they always point out that Panchanne cannot really be a "belle" (美少女, bishōjo) as she is much too old to even be considered a girl (少女, shōjo). Also, when first confronting the villain, she will say a verse from a Japanese poem.
To transform into Panchanne, Yumiko calls out "Ancien Régime, Tricolore!" (アンシャンレジーム・トリコロール！, Anshanrejīmu Torikorōru!). Panchanne's catchphrase is "Stepping through the flowers and the storm, the elegant and lovely fighter! The Socialite Belle Panchanne has arrived!!" (花も嵐も踏み越えて戦う愛のエレガント！美少女戦麗舞パンシャーヌ参上!!, Hana mo arashi mo fumikoete tatakau ai no ereganto! Bishōjo Serebu Panshānu sanjō!!)
Panchanne wields a baton, with which she can perform her Shiroganēze Attack (シロガネーゼアタック, Shiroganēze Atakku) which allows her to subdue villains. Her Pure Wave (ピュアウェーブ, Pyua Wēbu) purifies the hearts of villains. She has also used Gorgeous Scarf Whip (ゴージャスマフラーウィップ, Gōjasu Mafurā Wippu), First Class Beam (ファーストクラスビーム, Fāsuto Kurasu Bīmu), Elegant Four (エレガントフォア, Ereganto Foa), and Gorgeous Jewel Flash (ゴージャスジュエルフラッシュ, Gōjasu Jueru Furasshu) against villains.
Kensuke Shinjō (新庄 健介, Shinjō Kensuke; 30)
Yumiko's husband who initially is thought to be unaware of his wife's alteregos. However, later in the series it is revealed that before the series began he met her Kami-sama in a bar who revealed to him that she was previously Florence. After overhearing Yumiko complaining of not having an exciting life and reminiscing of her days as Florence, he pays Kami-sama to turn her into a superheroine, again. However, later in the series as her superheroics begin to put a strain on her marriage, Kensuke complains to Kami-sama, but in retaliation he turns him into Panchanne's nemesis the Super-Evil Devil (超悪デビル, Chōwaru Debiru).
Kiyoshi Shinjō (新庄 清志, Shinjō Kiyoshi; 23)
Kensuke's younger brother who works as a police officer in the town they live in. He continually tries to discover the identity of Panchanne, often accusing other women in the community. This usually angers Yumiko to the point where she will physically beat Kiyoshi for not believing that she is in fact Panchanne.
Risa Shinjō (新庄 理沙, Shinjō Risa; 6)
The daughter of Yumiko and Kensuke. She discovers her mother's secret and becomes the Socialite Belle Panchanne-Mini (美少女戦麗舞パンシャーヌミニ, Bishōjo Serebu Panshānumini) to assist her mother. Her powers as Panchanne-Mini are similar and weaker than Panchanne's, but she has her own Shiroganēze Attack Mini (シロガネーゼアタックミニ, Shiroganēze Atakku Mini).
Kami-sama (神様)
A Shinto deity who previously gave Yumiko her powers as Florence and gives them to her once more as Panchanne. He has lost all of his dignity as a kami, and has resorted to swindling people out of their money. He is also very short, even shorter than Yumiko.

== Episodes ==
1. Mama is a Superheroine! (ママはスーパーヒロイン！, Mama wa Sūpāhiroin!)
2. Mama's Beautiful Girl Illusion (ママの美少女イリュージョン, Mama no Bishōjo Iryūshon)
3. Healthy Ghost (健康的な幽霊, Kenkō Tenki na Yūrei)
4. The Zombie you Love (恋するゾンビ, Koisuru Zonbi)
5. Mature Divorce War (熟年離婚戦争, Jikunen Rikon Sensō)
6. Secret of Pet (ペットの秘密, Petto no Himitsu)
7. Mysterious Hill Diver (謎の丘ダイバー, Nazo no Oka Daibā)
8. Angry Cell Phone (怒れるケータイ電話, Okureru Kētai Denwa)
9. Scream of the Mama's Boy (マザコン男の叫び, Mazakon Otoko no Sakebi)
10. Mama's Memory Day (ママの記念日, Mama no Kinenbi)
11. Super Evil Devil Entry (超悪デビル登場, Chōwaru Debiru Tōjō)
12. Panchanne's Judgement (パンシャーヌ裁判, Panshānu Saiban)
13. Calm Last Time (穏やかな最終回, Odayaka na Saishū Kai)

== Cast ==
- Yumiko Shinjō/Socialite Belle Panchanne - Haruna Yabuki (矢吹 春奈, Yabuki Haruna)
- Kenske Shinjō - Hirotaka Ōkuma (大熊 啓誉, Ōkuma Hirotaka)
- Kiyoshi Shinjō - Tetsuya Makita (牧田 哲也, Makita Tetsuya)
- Risa Shinjō/Socialite Belle Panchanne-Mini - Himawari Kitayama (北山 向日葵, Kitayama Himawari)
- Kami-sama - Neko Hiroshi (猫ひろし)

== Songs ==
Opening theme

- "Happiness & Tenderness"
  - Lyrics: Ringo Mori (森 林檎, Mori Ringo)
  - Composition & Arrangement: Takayuki Negishi
  - Artist: Haruna Yabuki

Ending theme

- "Fellow"
  - Lyrics: Kazumichi Dōan (堂安 一途, Dōan Kazumichi)
  - Composition & Arrangement: GEN
  - Artist: Rain Note
