= Maps (manga) =

Japanese manga series

- The cover of the first volume of Maps

マップス (Mappusu)
- Genre: Science fiction
- Manga
- Written by: Yuichi Hasegawa
- Published by: Gakken
- Magazine: Monthly Comic Nora
- Original run: 1985 – 1994
- Volumes: 17
- Original video animation

Maps: Densetsu no Samayoeru Seijintachi
- Directed by: Keiji Hayakawa
- Written by: Kenji Terada
- Music by: Kohei Tanaka
- Studio: Studio Gallop
- Released: July 14, 1987
- Runtime: 51 minutes
- Original video animation
- Directed by: Susumu Nishizawa
- Written by: Masaki Tsuji
- Music by: Masahiro Kawasaki
- Studio: TMS Entertainment
- Licensed by: NA: ADV Films
- Released: July 8, 1994 – February 24, 1995
- Episodes: 4
- Manga

Maps Gaiden
- Written by: Yuichi Hasegawa
- Published by: Gakken
- Magazine: Monthly Comic Nora
- Original run: 1996 – 1997
- Volumes: 2

Maps (マップス) is a Japanese manga series written and illustrated by Yuichi Hasegawa. It was serialized in the Gakken magazine Monthly Comic Nora from 1985 to 1994. The series was adapted into two anime original video animations (OVAs): the 1987 original, fully titled Maps: Densetsu no Samayoeru Seijintachi (マップス 伝説のさまよえる星人たち; lit. 'Maps: Legendary Space Wanderers') in Japan, and the 1994 remake, simply titled Maps.

== Plot ==
Maps follows a normal Earth boy named Gen. He and his girlfriend Hoshimi meet Lipmira, a woman from outer space, who tells Gen that he is the "mapman", meaning the map to a great treasure is coded in his genes. Gen and Hoshimi leave Earth with Lipmira to find the treasure, a quest shared by evil space people whom they are often compelled to fight against. Notable aspects of the series are the spaceships (which look like giant silver angelic women, often described as "hood ornaments") and the robot women that control them, or more precisely embody them for dealings with regular-sized life forms (Lipmira is one of these robot embodiments). Each ship and its pilot have a distinct character, from playful to evil.

== Media ==
=== Manga ===
Maps was written and illustrated by Yuichi Hasegawa. It was serialized in the Gakken magazine Monthly Comic Nora from 1985 to 1994. A total of 17 tankōbon bound volumes were published in Japan between 1987 and 1995. Japan Media Factory re-released the manga in bunkoban format in 2003.

=== OVAs ===
Two OVAs based on Maps have been created. The first, Maps: Densetsu no Samayoeru Seijintachi, was produced by Studio Gallop, directed by Keiji Hayakawa, written by Kenji Terada, and musically scored by Kohei Tanaka. It was released exclusively in Japan on July 17, 1987. The second, simply titled Maps, was animated by TMS Entertainment, directed by Susumu Nishizawa, written by Masaki Tsuji, and musically scored by Masahiro Kawasaki. It was released in Japan in four episodes split into two volumes on July 8, 1994, and February 24, 1995. An English version of this OVA was later licensed by ADV Films and distributed in North America.

==== 1994–1995 OVA episodes ====
1. Galactic Angel (ACT1 宇宙（あま）翔ける天使, Act 1: Ama Kakeru Tenshi)
2. A Reward for the Travelers (ACT2 トラベラーの報酬, Act 2: Traveller no Hōshū)
3. Six Ghost Ships (ACT3 六人の幽霊船, Act 3: Rokunin no Yūreisen)
4. Revival of the Legend (ACT4 伝説の復活, Act 4: Densetsu no Fukkatsu)
