= Firestorm (TV series) =

Japanese anime television series

- Title card

ファイアーストーム (Faiâsutômu)
- Genre: Adventure; Mecha
- Anime television series
- Directed by: Kenji Terada
- Written by: Story: Gerry Anderson; John Needham; Screenplay: Kenji Terada; Sukehiro Tomita
- Studio: Trans Arts
- Licensed by: Enoki Films
- Original network: TV Tokyo
- Original run: April 6, 2003 – September 28, 2003
- Episodes: 26

Firestorm (ファイアーストーム) is a Japanese anime series created by Gerry Anderson and John Needham. The series combines CGI animation for mecha and traditional 2D animation for characters. The series was not warmly received, and subsequently failed to gain a wider release.

== Plot ==
By the year 2104, the nations of Earth have finally achieved world peace. However, that peace is threatened by a new worldwide terrorist organization called Black Orchid. To counter this threat, the United Nations has created a military peacekeeping force called Storm Force. Each Storm Force unit (8 total) acts independently, operating primarily from a large twin-hulled submarine. As the series opens, a new elite unit is formed called Storm Force 9, which is assigned a special mission; code-named "Firestorm."

Early in the series, the Firestorm team discover Black Orchid is secretly a front for a worldwide invasion of space aliens who can disguise themselves as humans. The aliens have developed a drug which will turn humans into their mindless slaves, and they plot to put the drug into the Earth's water supply.

Each episode focuses strongly on futuristic vehicles (mecha). The Firestorm team operate primarily from a huge twin-hulled submarine, called the Ocean Storm. This submarine features a detachable jet aircraft called the Tornado, making it similar to SkyDiver from Gerry Anderson's 1970–71 series UFO. Visually, the Tornado resembles Thunderbird 2 from Anderson's 1965–66 series Thunderbirds. While Thunderbird 2 carried a variety of pods containing smaller vehicles, the Tornado carries a group of smaller vehicles at all times, including two jet fighters, a futuristic tank and several boats.

== Characters ==
=== Storm Force 2 ===
- Inuma (イヌマ): SF2 captain, and friend of Drew McAllister. He was killed in episode 26 when fighting alien spearhead units.

=== Storm Force 5 ===
- Mai Teranishi (マイ・テラニシ): Japanese officer, and nuclear furnace expert.

=== Storm Force 9 ===
All members of Storm Force 9 wear snug-fitting, futuristic blue wet suits. Males tend to wear a blue military jacket over the wet suit when not working underwater.

- Nagisa Kisaragi (ナギサ・キサラギ): Japanese, short black hair, mole under right eye. Arguably the central character. She is an "expert on nano-engineering." Nagisa set the world record in the 2096 Tokyo Olympics in the marathon and free-fall parachuting events. Her designation is 01.
- Sam Scott (サム・スコット): American, age 28, blue eyes, dark brown hair, Caucasian.
- Wesley Grant (ウェズリー・グラント): American, age 30, brown eyes, African-American, black beard.
- Laura Hope (ローラ・ホープ): Australian, age 25, Caucasian, green eyes, green hair. She is a bomb specialist and former Australian Navy commander.
- James Brady (ジェームス・ブレーディ): British, age 29, Caucasian, gray eyes, blond hair.
- Drew McAllister (ドリュー・マッキャリスター): SF9 captain (an older caucasian man with brown hair and a brown beard with white streaks).
- Chuck Morgan (チャック・モーガン)
- Geena (ジーナ)
- Lucy (ルーシー)
- Julia (ジュリア)
- Jack (ジャック)
- Yuri (ユーリ)
- Sophia (ソフィア)
- Hiroko (ヒロコ)
- Tatsu (タツ): SF9 mechanic.
- POP: The popcorn dispenser robot working for Chuck.

=== Other SF officers ===
- Duvalier? (デュバリエ)
- Valente? (ヴァレンテ)

=== Black Orchid ===
- Carlo Morelli (カルロ・モレーリ)
- Ruth Miller (ルース・ミラー)
- Petros Salo (ペトロス・サロ)
- Makalev? (マカレフ)
- Cosminov? (コズミノフ)

== Vehicles ==
- Ocean Storm (オーシャン・ストーム): Storm Force nuclear submarine.
- Thunderbolt (サンダーボルト): Fighter aircraft designed to replace Thunder Laser.
- Tornado (トルネード): Aircraft carrying officers, Thunderbolt, Combatcruiser.
- Seashark (シーシャーク): Marine vehicle that also serves as submarine.
- Combatcruiser (コンバットクルーザー): Armoured van carrying officers in ground missions.
- Mountain Motorbike (マウンテン・モーターバイク): Armed motorcycle.
- Space Thunderbolt: A modified Thunderbolt designed to carry the Black Orchid beacon into space.
- Gargantua: A hydrogen carrier. The vehicle was hijacked by Black Orchid and later destroyed by SF9 using liquid explosives.
- Stargazer: Stealth telescope used by Storm Force to detect alien threats.

== Reboot ==
In 2014, Gerry Anderson's company Anderson Entertainment announced that it was launching a crowdfunding campaign to produce a pilot episode for a new television series of Firestorm using practical film-making techniques including practical special effects and puppetry. This was a ground-up remake, using Anderson's original documents. Operation Firestorm is now the codename for the defeat of Black Orchid; Sam Scott, Nagisa Kisaragi, Drew McAllister and Laura Hope remain. Ocean Storm, Tornado and Combatcruiser also remain with the latter being renamed to "Blizzard". The miniature effects crew included Anderson veterans Steve Begg and Bill Pearson (who had more recently worked on recent Bond films Casino Royale) and Doctor Who's Mike Tucker, while puppets are to be made by the company Mackinnon and Saunders.

On 18 February 2016, Jamie Anderson announced to Kickstarter backers that the pilot would soon begin shooting. Filming began on 29 February. It was released via YouTube on 27 October 2018.
