= Masami Hisamoto =

Japanese comedian, actress and singer (born 1958)

- 久本雅美
- Born: July 9, 1958 (age 68); Osaka, Osaka, Japan
- Education: Kinran Junior College
- Employer: Wahaha-Hompo
- Relatives: Tomoko Hisamoto

Comedy career
- Years active: 1981–present
- Subject: Shimoneta

Masami Hisamoto (Japanese: 久本雅美, Hepburn: Hisamoto Masami; born July 9, 1958) is a Japanese comedian, actress, singer and tarento from Kami, Osaka. She belongs to the Wahaha-Hompo talent agency, appearing on variety shows like Waratte Iitomo! and Hirunandesu!. She has also been a notable adherent to Soka Gakkai since 1984 and became an internet meme for it.

== Career ==
After graduating from Kinran Junior College, Hisamoto decided to move to Tokyo and made her debut as a vulgar stage actor at the Gekidan Tokyo Vodovil Show in 1981. She would end up working with Masahiro Sato and Rie Shibata, then the three left to launch Wahaha-Hompo in 1984. Her first major televised appearance would be on the Nippon TV variety show Honya wa Saikyo! in 1985, then she became a regular member of the Fuji TV variety show Waratte Iitomo! that ran from 1993 to 2010.

Since the late 2010s, she has served as a finalist judge on NHK's Shinjin Engei Taisho, Kansai TV's R-1 Grand Prix, and Nippon TV's Onna Geinin No. 1 Kettei-sen.

== Appearances ==
- Waratte Iitomo! (1993–2010)
- Hirunandesu! (2011–present)
- Invisinle (2022), Chizuko Fukutome (ep. 2)

== Personal life ==
Hisamoto became an adherent to Soka Gakkai on September 28, 1984, later becoming the deputy of the Fine Arts Department and head of the Women's Department. Her appearances in Shinano Kikaku's promotional videos for Soka Gakkai have become an internet meme on video-sharing websites like Nico Nico Douga and YouTube, though these videos are frequently taken down on the grounds of copyright infringement. In addition, Hisamoto is known to be a vocal supporter of the Soka Gakkai-backed, conservative political party Komeito.
