= Jeff Yabuki =

American businessman

Jeffery W. Yabuki
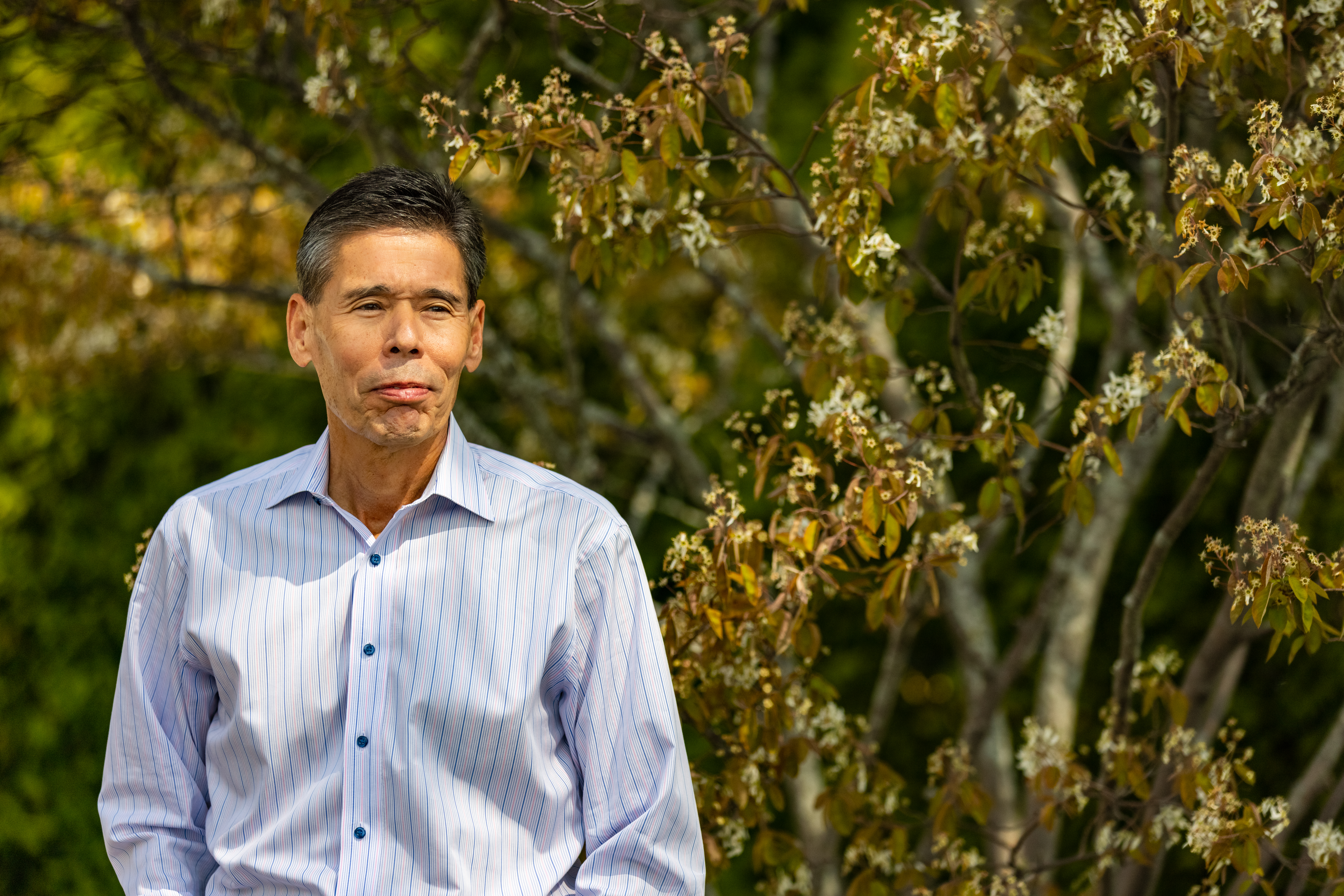
- Education: California State University, Los Angeles
- Occupation: Businessman
- Years active: 1980s - present
- Employer(s): Motive Partners, InvestCloud
- Known for: American Express • H&R Block • Fiserv, Inc. • Motive Partners • InvestCloud
- Spouse: Gail Groenwoldt Yabuki
- Honours: 2007 Innovator of the Year Award from Bank Technology • 2007 Innovation Hall of Fame Inductee from Bank Technology • 2017 UW-Milwaukee Chancellor's Innovation Award • Top American Innovators of 2019 from Forbes • 2021 Corporate Citizen of the Year from BizTimes Milwaukee • 2022 Donald Driver "Driven to Achieve" Award Honoree • 2024 UW-Milwaukee Honorary Doctor of Business Degree • 2024 Project Healthy Minds Humanitarians of the Year • 2025 Wisconsin Business Hall of Fame Inductee

Jeffery "Jeff" W. Yabuki is an American businessman currently serving as chairman of Motive Partners and chairman & CEO of InvestCloud. He previously served as the CEO of Fiserv, a Fortune 500 Company, from 2005-2020 and the executive vice president and COO of H&R Block. In 2019, Yabuki was named among the top 30 most innovative leaders in America by Forbes.

== Early life ==
Yabuki was born in the greater Los Angeles, California area as the eldest child of parents who faced significant adversity being American immigrants. His father George is a first-generation Japanese American who was placed in an internment camp for two and half years during World War II. Yabuki graduated from California State University, Los Angeles with a Bachelor of Science in Business Administration with an emphasis in Accounting.

== Career ==
=== Early career ===
Yabuki began his career working in public accounting and as a CPA. He spent twelve years working for American Express, where he held a progression of leadership roles and eventually became president and CEO of American Express Tax and Business Services.

Yabuki joined H&R Block in 1999 as President of H&R Block International, where he led tax service operations and the development of financial strategies in Canada, Australia and the United Kingdom. In 2002, Yabuki became H&R Block’s executive vice president and COO, a position he held until 2005.

=== Fiserv ===
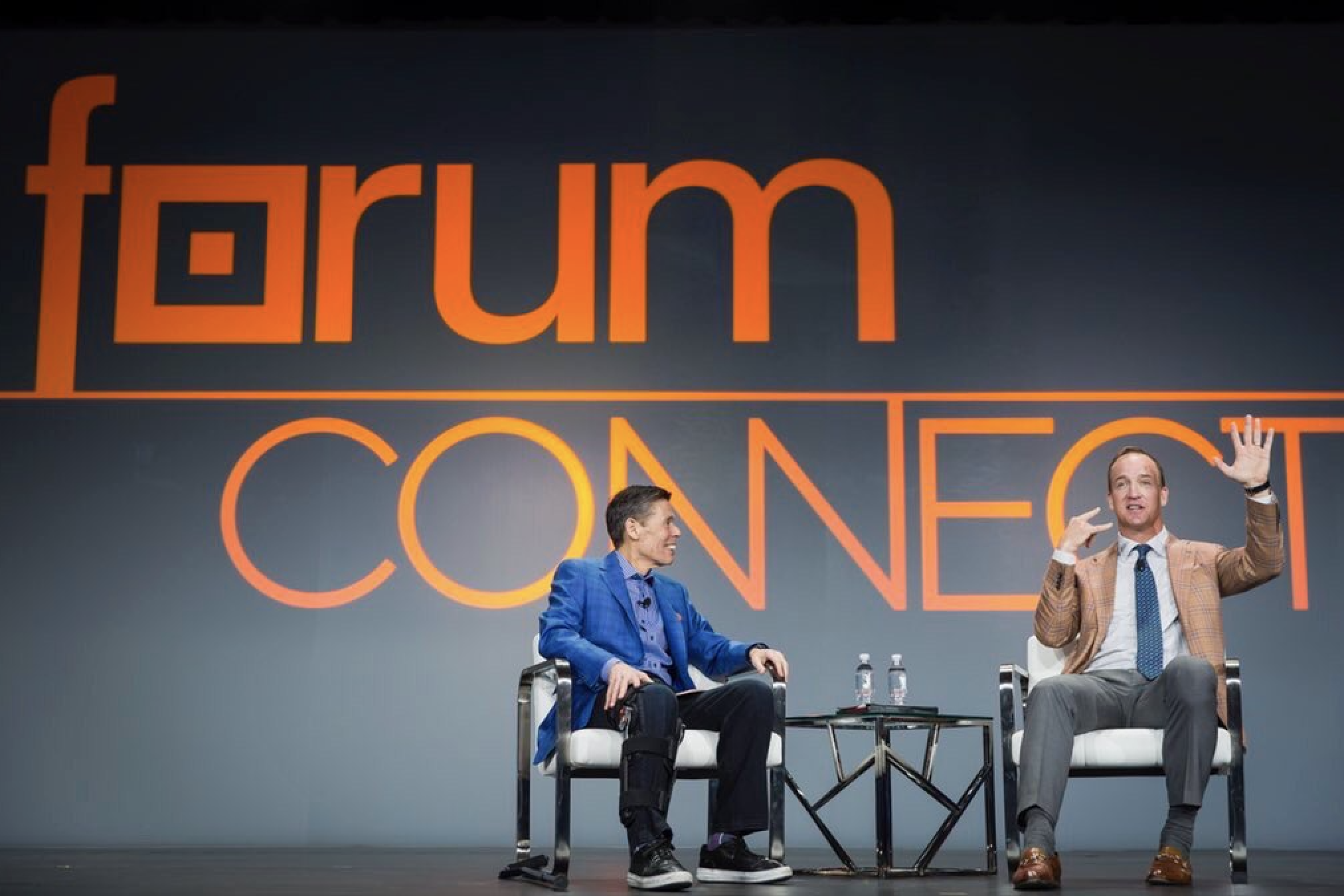
Yabuki interviewing Peyton Manning on stage at a Fiserv event.

In 2005, Yabuki joined Fiserv, a global leader in financial services and payment technologies, where he served as CEO, a member of the board of directors and as chairman beginning in 2019. Fiserv achieved substantial financial and business success under Yabuki’s leadership from 2005-2020, nearly tripling in revenue and delivering a shareholder return of 969%. During this time, Fiserv outperformed the S&P 500 Index and saw double-digit adjusted earnings per share growth every year. The company also saw increased associate engagement in the top quartile of all large employers and was routinely named a Fortune World’s Most Admired Company, including nine of the last ten years of his tenure.

Yabuki led Fiserv’s business model and brand transformation from a traditional holding company to an integrated operating company as the organization became the leading global provider of fintech and payment software through the combination of internal investments and strategic acquisitions.

==== First Data Acquisition ====
In 2019, Yabuki led the acquisition of First Data in a nearly $40 billion deal, including $22 billion in stock and the assumption of $17 billion in debt. At the time, First Data was also a Fortune 500 company and the world’s largest payment processor. The acquisition made Fiserv the largest merchant service platform in the world. The deal also generated significant cost synergies, initially projected at $900 million annually and soon raised to at least $1.2 billion, and was described as a masterclass in mergers & acquisitions by acclaimed portfolio manager David R. Giroux in his book Capital Allocation: Principles, Strategies, and Processes for Creating Long-Term Shareholder Value:

“From a process standpoint, this is one of the best large transactions I have come across in my career… The deal was very accretive to earnings. FISV provided guidance that the deal would be 20% accretive to Earnings per Share (EPS) in its first full year and 40% accretive to EPS once all the synergies were taken into account … Fiserv should be able to generate high-single-digit to low teens returns on invested capital by year five.”

— David R. Giroux, Author and Chief Investment Officer for Equities and Multi-Asset at T. Rowe Price

When the deal closed Fiserv became a $15 billion a year company with close to 50,000 employees.

==== Fiserv Forum ====
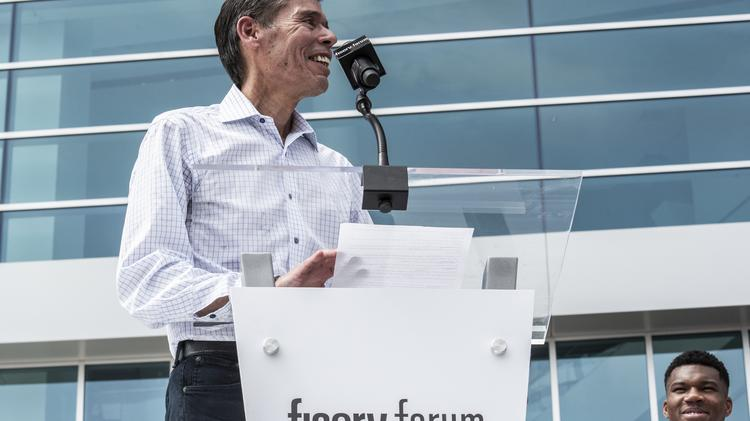
Yabuki speaking at the official ribbon cutting of the Fiserv Forum in August 2018.

In 2018, Yabuki helped lead a deal with the Milwaukee Bucks of the National Basketball Association on a 25-year naming rights agreement for Fiserv Forum, their newly built sports complex. Yabuki participated in the official ribbon-cutting for Fiserv Forum in August 2018 with NBA Commissioner Adam Silver, Bucks Owners Marc Lasry and Wes Edens, Bucks President Peter Feigin, Bucks coach Mike Budenholzer, and Bucks players and legends including Giannis Antetokounmpo, Kareem Abdul-Jabbar, Khris Middleton, Marques Johnson, Michael Redd, and Steve Novak.

==== Fiserv succession ====
Yabuki retired from Fiserv in 2020, consistent with his belief that organizations benefit from new leadership and fresh perspective. He was succeeded as CEO by Frank Bisignano and as chairman by Denis J. O’Leary.

=== Motive Partners ===
In September 2021, Yabuki became chairman at Motive Partners, a private equity firm founded by Rob Heyvaert focused on control-oriented growth and buyout investments in software and information services companies that serve the fintech industry.

=== Board Member ===
Yabuki serves on the boards of several prominent organizations across financial, technology, arts, and nonprofit sectors. He is a member of the Board of Directors for Nasdaq, the Royal Bank of Canada, the United States-Japan Foundation, and serves as Chairman of Sportradar. In the cultural sector, he was elected as Chair of the Board of trustees for the Milwaukee Art Museum in 2021 and joined the board of the Los Angeles County Museum of Art in 2023. He also serves on the board of Project Healthy Minds, a mental health technology nonprofit.

=== University of Wisconsin-Milwaukee ===
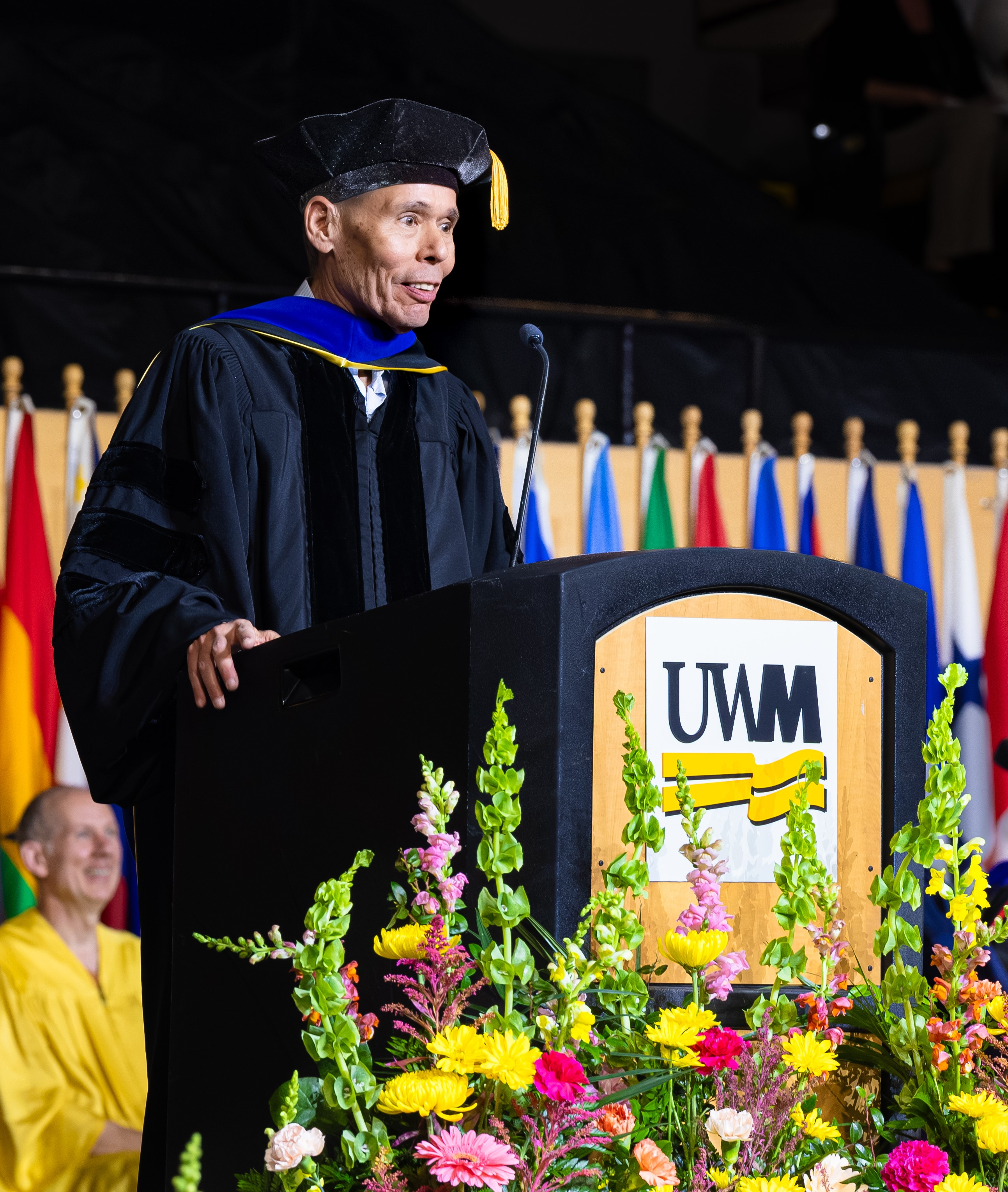
Yabuki delivering the keynote address at the University of Wisconsin-MIlwaukee's 2024 spring commencement ceremony.

In September 2022, Yabuki was named Executive-in-residence at the University of Wisconsin-Milwaukee’s Sheldon B. Lubar College of Business, where he teaches courses on fintech and business strategy and serves as a mentor to students.

On May 19, 2024, Yabuki was invited by Chancellor Mark Mone to serve as the keynote speaker for the university's commencement ceremony where he also received an honorary PhD in Business.

=== Wisconsin Business Hall of Fame ===
In 2025, Yabuki was inducted into the Wisconsin Business Hall of Fame for his contributions to Wisconsin’s business community and beyond through transformational leadership and civic impact. The annual award is presented by Junior Achievement of Wisconsin and celebrates both lifetime achievement and commitment to community. Fellow 2025 laureates included Mark Murphy of the Green Bay Packers, Judy and Thomas Pyle Jr. of Rayovac, and John Schlifske of Northwestern Mutual.

== Philanthropy ==
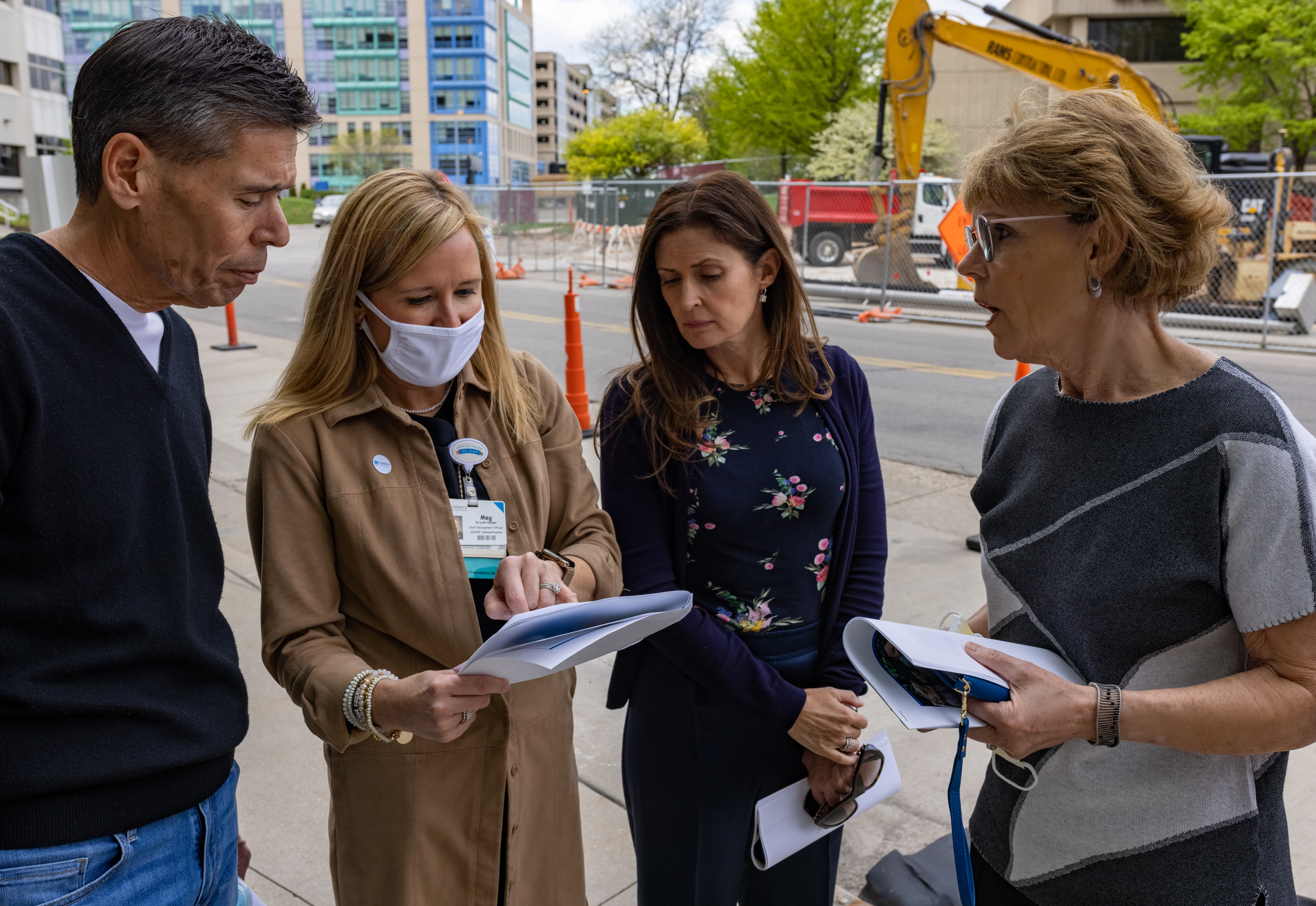
Yabuki onsite at Children's Wisconsin leading up to the announcement of The Yabuki Family Foundation gift.

Yabuki founded The Yabuki Family Foundation in 1999, to tackle some of the world’s toughest problems with a particular focus on mental and emotional health, education, arts, and social justice.

In July 2021, the foundation jointly announced a $20 million gift to Children's Wisconsin, the largest single gift in the history of the institution, to integrate mental and behavioral health services at every touchpoint. The gift was made to honor Jeff’s late brother Craig, who died by suicide in 2017 after a lifelong battle with depression. It also launched the “Change the Checkup Challenge” – a $5 million match campaign that served as a call-to-action for others to help transform the response to the growing pediatric mental health crisis.

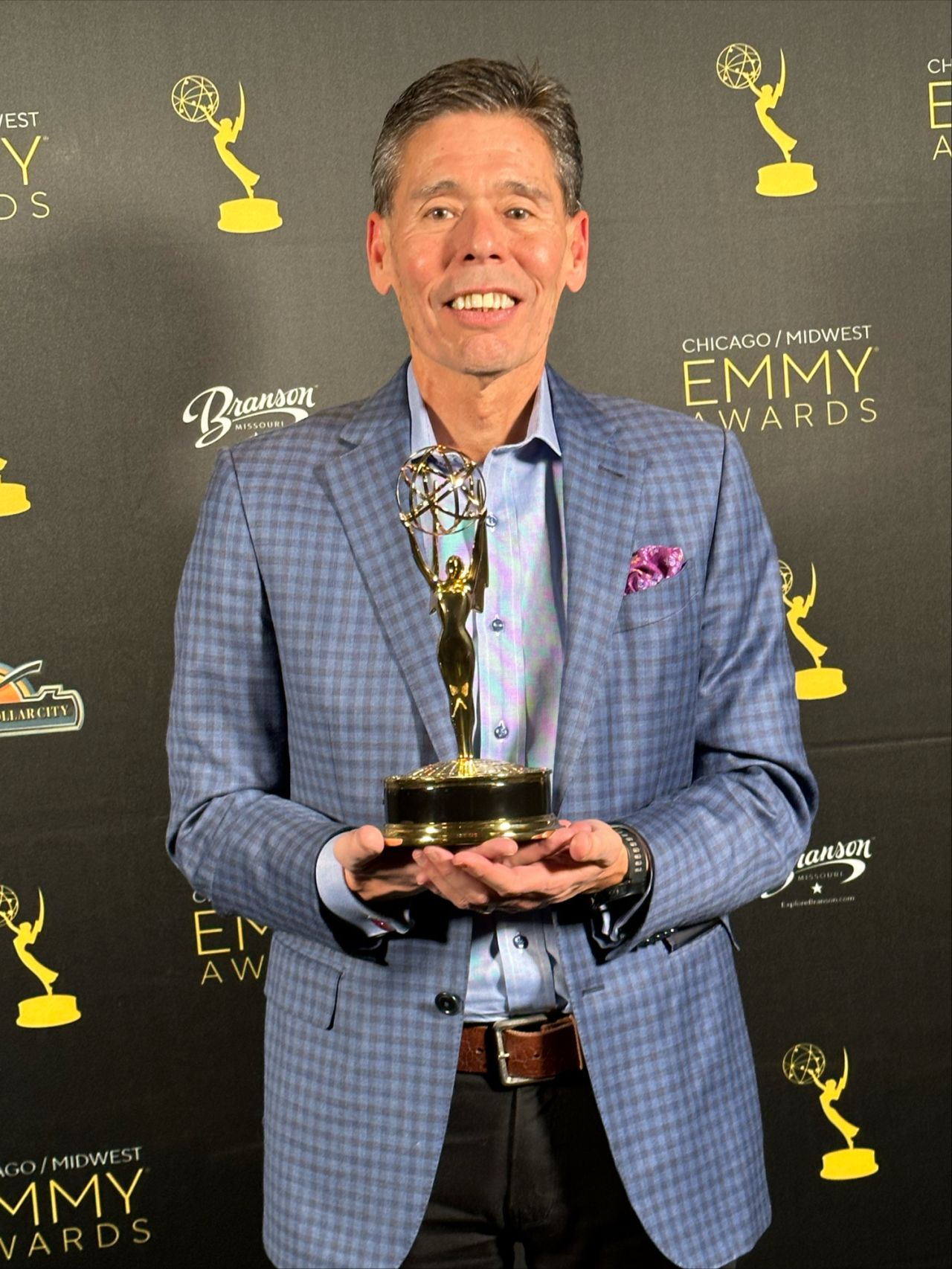
Yabuki at the 64th Annual Chicago / Midwest Emmy Awards where "A Brother's Journey" won the Midwest Emmy for Human Interest – Short Form.

The targeted philanthropy placed full-time, master’s-trained therapists in every Children’s Wisconsin primary care office and urgent care location – serving roughly a third of the pediatric population in southeast Wisconsin. It created the state’s first mental health walk-in clinic, which opened in Craig’s name in March 2022, offering help to children and adolescents experiencing urgent mental health issues and emergencies. It also funded the first-ever endowed chair of mental and behavioral health research, conducting longitudinal research at Children’s to measure impact and put science into practice in a timely manner.

By August 2024, the solutions spurred by the gift had enabled hundreds of thousands of mental health encounters, with more than 180,000 kids screened or seen for mental health concerns, and the health system’s outpatient therapy waitlist was reduced by more than half.

In 2021, the short documentary “A Brother’s Journey” was produced and released to tell the story behind the foundation’s record-setting gift and underscore the importance of transformational solutions for kids’ mental health. Much of the film is delivered from Yabuki’s perspective, as he describes his family’s journey and their vision to ensure every child has access to the care they need. The documentary won a Midwest Emmy in the category of “Outstanding Achievement for Human Interest – Short Form” at the 64th Annual Chicago / Midwest Emmy Awards held in Chicago on December 3, 2022.

In September 2024, Project Healthy Minds announced Jeff and his wife Gail as “Humanitarians of the Year” for their World Mental Health Day Festival and Gala held annually on October 10 in New York City and hosted by The Today Show’s Carson Daly.

The Yabuki Family Foundation, jointly operated by Jeff and Gail, has also supported a number of institutions, including the Milwaukee Art Museum, Milwaukee Public Museum, Greater Milwaukee Foundation, Boys & Girls Club of Greater Milwaukee, Los Angeles County Museum of Art, Museum Associates, Milwaukee Film, Telluride Film Festival, United Performing Arts Fund, American Red Cross, Sojourner Family Peace Center, Peta, Thorn, United Way, and more.
