= Angkor Wat Marathons =

Annual race in Cambodia

- Logo of Angkor Wat International Half Marathon
- Date: early December
- Location: Angkor, Cambodia
- Event type: Road
- Distance: Marathon, half marathon
- Established: 1996 (Half marathon); 2014 (Marathon)
- Website: Angkor Wat Marathons
- Participants: 2,555 (2019); 2,906 (2018)

The Angkor Wat Marathons are the annual marathons held in Angkor, Cambodia. There are two marathons from Angkor recognised by the Association of International Marathons and Distance Races namely Angkor Wat International Half Marathon and Angkor Empire Marathon. Angkor Wat International Half Marathon has been held annually since 1996. Angkor Empire Marathon is the first full marathon from Cambodia held since 2014. The event is organized by National Olympic Committee of Cambodia (NOCC). According to its official website, the purpose of the event is to "support a ban on the manufacture and inhumane use of antipersonnel mines".

== Angkor Wat International Half Marathon ==
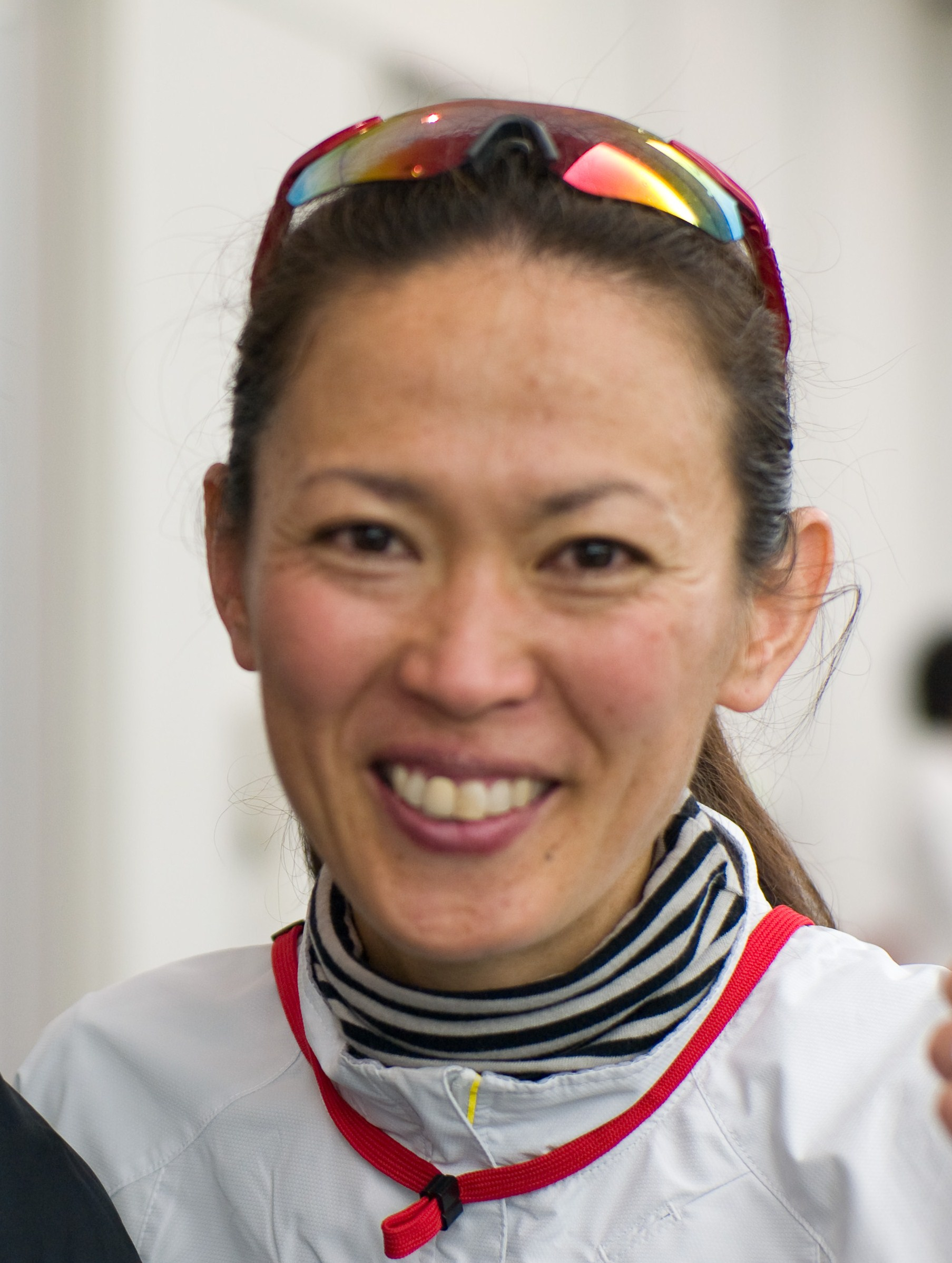
Japanese Olympian Yuko Arimori organized the first Angkor Marathon in 1996.

The Angkor Wat International Half Marathon was first organized in 1996 by Yuko Arimori, the first Japanese woman to win a marathon medal in the Olympic Games. The motto of the marathon is "Building a better future. Aid for the children and disabled in Cambodia". It is organized by National Olympic Committee of Cambodia, Association of Athletics Federations Cambodia and Cambodian Events Organizer Co. Ltd. The marathon is recognized by Association of International Marathons and Distance Races and the Association of Athletics Federations Cambodia (Khmer AAF). It is supported by the government of Cambodia, the Embassy of Japan in Cambodia, the United Nations Population Fund, and several other organizations.

The first edition of the International Half Marathon in 1996 saw just 654 participants from 14 countries. Since then participation in the event has steadily increased. In the 2014 event, nearly 8,000 runners from 78 countries participated.

=== List of winners ===
Key: Course record

Edition	Year	Men's winner	Time (h:m:s)	Women's winner	Time (h:m:s)
1st	1996	Zhan Donglin (CHN)	1:05:18	Wang Xiujie (CHN)	1:12:27
2nd	1997	Winner not available		Win-Win Mar (MYA)	1:15:18
3rd	1998	Winner not available		Yumiko Otsuka (JPN)	1:15:18
4th	1999	Winner not available		Thị Hoa Nguyễn (VIE)	1:30:17
5th	2000	Winner not available		Hiromi Suzuki (JPN)	1:15:03
6th	2001	Makoto Sasaki (JPN)	1:10:38	Yuko Machida (JPN)	1:19:54
7th	2002	Winner not available		Winner not available	
8th	2003	Winner not available		Winner not available	
9th	2004	Hem Bunting (CAM)	1:14:32	Winner not available	
10th	2005	Hem Bunting (CAM)	1:10:43	Winner not available	
11th	2006	Hem Bunting (CAM)	1:12:25	Wakana Akimoto (JPN)	1:26:52
12th	2007	Tony Seakins (GBR)	1:18:58	Mika Kume (JPN)	1:34:26
13th	2008	Hem Bunting (CAM)	1:13:53	Vivian Tang (SGP)	n/a
14th	2009	Lim Kien Mau (MYS)	1:13:26	Vivian Tang (SGP)	1:24:00
15th	2010	Hem Bunting (CAM)	1:10:11	Satoko Uetani (JPN)	1:22:31
16th	2011	Henrik Jannborg (SWE)	1:13:02	Jenny Lundgren (SWE)	1:25:15
17th	2012	Joji Mori (AUS)	1:14:55	Jenny Lundgren (SWE)	1:25:45
18th	2013	Minoru Onozuka (JPN)	1:16:10	Vivian Tang (SGP)	1:27:82
19th	2014	Ma Viro (CAM)	1:16:10	Vivian Tang (SGP)	1:28:06
20th	2015	Fraser Thompson (AUS)	1:12:19	Phap Sopheak (CAM)	1:23:43
21st	2016	Bian Qi (CHN)	1:13:16	Danielle Hodgkinson (GBR)	1:23:09
22nd	2017	Bian Qi (CHN)	1:12:42	Máire Nic Amhlaoibh (IRE)	1:28:42
23rd	2018	Valentin Cuzzucoli (FRA)	1:17:18	Rebecca Rosel (AUS)	1:28:46
24th	2019	Saeki Makino (JPN)	1:07:34	Máire Nic Amhlaoibh (IRE)	1:24:55
25th	2022	Farit Ouk (CAM)	1:18:24	Nicole Distler (DEU)	1:40:16
26th	2023	Neko Hiroshi (CAM)	1:25:30	Yuko Tanimura (JPN)	1:29:25

== Angkor Empire Marathon ==
Logo of Angkor Empire Marathon

The full length marathon was introduced in 2014. It is the first full marathon (42 km) in Cambodia, and is organized and supported by same agencies as the half marathon. Over 2000 participants from 48 countries participated in the 2015 edition of marathon. Angkor Hospital for Children, Kantha Bopha Children’s Hospital, and the Cambodian Red Cross are beneficiaries of the Angkor Empire Marathon. Neko Hiroshi, a Japanese native and naturalized Cambodian citizen, was the first winner of Empire marathon in 2014, while Japanese runner Koki Kawauchi was the winner of the 2015 edition. Sakie Ishiba Shi, also of Japan, won the women's full marathon in 2015. The 2015 edition held in August saw around 2,200 participants.

=== List of winners ===
Key: Course record

Edition	Year	Men's winner	Time (h:m:s)	Women's winner	Time (h:m:s)
1st	2014	Neko Hiroshi (CAM)	2:45:28	Veronique Messina (FRA)	3:36:04
2nd	2015	Koki Kawauchi (JPN)	2:36:58	Sakie Ishibashi (JPN)	2:59:12
3rd	2016	Jeff Chaseling (AUS)	2:49:56	Erina Nakai (JPN)	3:19:34
4th	2017	Neil Burns (GBR)	3:08:08	Carlota Corbella (ESP)	3:19:03
5th	2018	Ma Viro (CAM)	2:56:24	Jill Hamill (GBR)	3:06:59
6th	2019	Neko Hiroshi (CAM)	2:43:07	Shi Hongxia (CHN)	3:33:49
7th	2022	Sam Rachna (CAM)	3:26:09	Elaine Lee (HKG)	3:37:11
8th	2023	Van Long Nguyen (VNM)	2:51:12	Thi Duong Nguyen (VNM)	3:21:32
9th	2024	Pheara Vann (CAM)	2:40:51	Caitriona Jennings (IRL)	3:05:41

== Marathon course ==
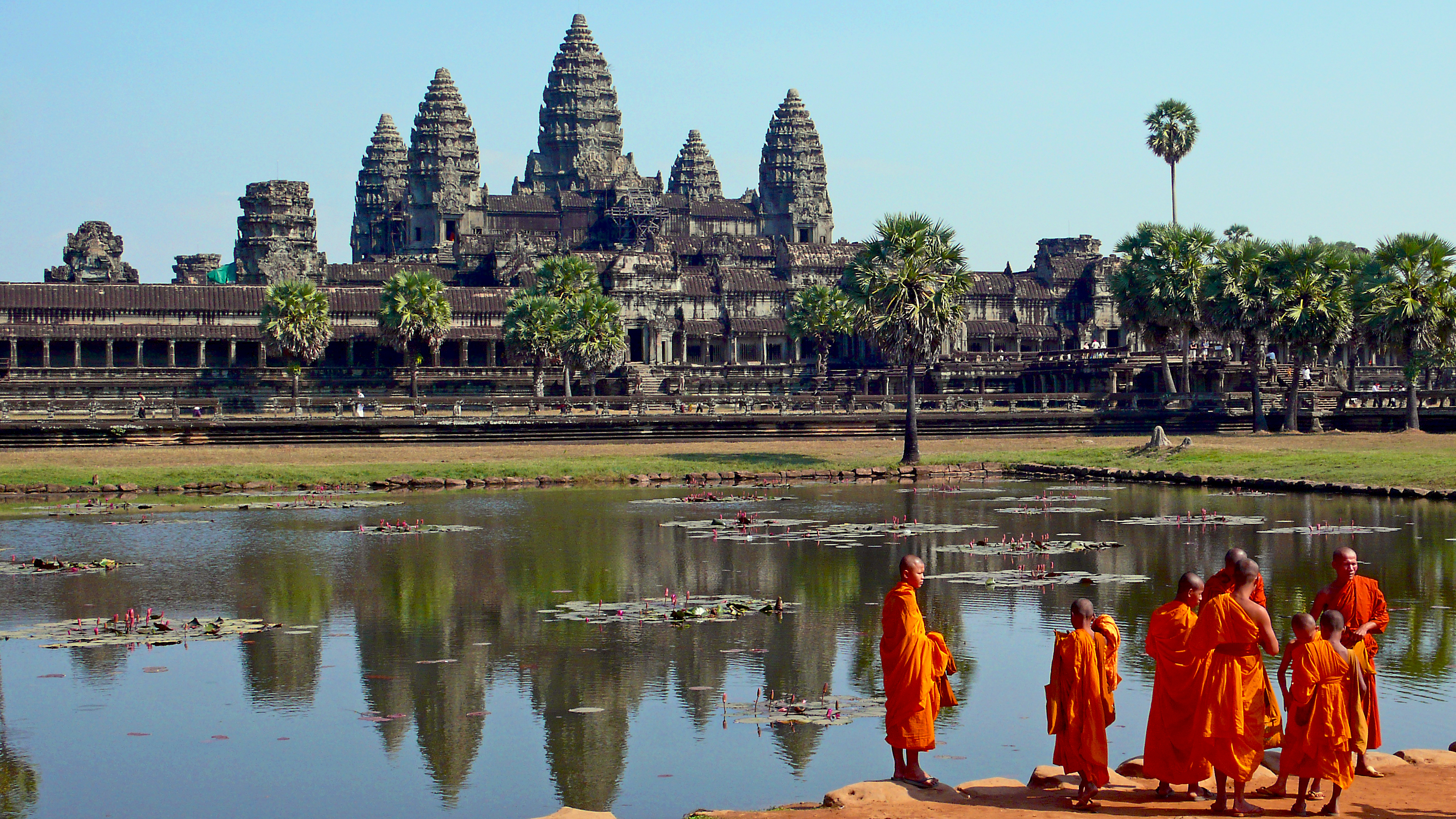
Angkor Wat is the site where marathon starts and ends.

The Marathon starts and ends at the Angkor Wat temple complex, a World Heritage Site. Other important spots over course of run are the Angkor Archaeological Park, Preah Prom Rath pagoda, and several other temples.
