= La Belle Fille Masquée Poitrine =

Television series

- Genre: Tokusatsu, magical girl, comedy
- Created by: Shotaro Ishinomori
- Written by: Yoshio Urasawa
- Directed by: Takaharu Saeki, Shinji Murayama, Tarou Sakamoto, Kaneharu Mitsumura, Naoki Iwahara
- Starring: Yuko Hanajima, Rie Maeda, Shigeru Saiki
- Opening theme: 17 no Koro by Sayuri Saito
- Ending theme: Kanashimi ni Ichiban Chikai Basho by Yuko Hanashima; Anata dake Change me by Yuko Hanashima
- Composer: Yusuke Honma
- Country of origin: Japan
- Original language: Japanese
- No. of episodes: 51

Production
- Producer: Jun Hikasa,
- Running time: 25 min.
- Production companies: Toei Company; Ishimori Productions

Original release
- Network: Fuji TV
- Release: January 7 – December 30, 1990

Related
- Magical Chinese Girl Ipanema; Mysterious Nile Girl Thutmose

La Belle Fille Masquée Poitrine (美少女仮面ポワトリン, Bishōjo Kamen Powatorin; The Masked Belle Poitrine/Beautiful Masked Girl Poitrine) is a magical girl tokusatsu comedy series starring Yuko Hanajima. Created by Shotaro Ishinomori, it was the 11th installment of the Toei Fushigi Comedy Series broadcast on Fuji Television. The series ran from January 7, 1990 to December 30, 1990 for a total of 51 episodes.

== Synopsis ==
It's the first day of the new school year and the Murakami kids, Yuko, Momoko and Takuto, are excited to be heading back and catch up with their friends. While Takuto makes it to school, Yuko stops by a shrine that doesn’t get too many visitors these days to pray for the new school year. At the shrine Yuko accidentally breaks the bell and drops it on top of a kami's head. Because she is the only person that stopped by the shrine in a long time, he grants her the power to become a superheroine, based on another ancient deity. It is her job to protect her neighborhood from the threats it faces. With the transformation phrase "Cosmo Magic! Métamorphose!!" (コスモ・マジック! メタモルフォーゼ!!, Kosumo Majikku! Metamorufōze!!) she transforms into the Masked Belle Poitrine. Later she gets an ally in Poitrine Petite, in reality her little sister Momoko.

== Characters ==
Yuko Murakami/Poitrine (村上 ユウコ/ポワトリン, Murakami Yuko/Powatorin)
Portrayed by Yūko Hanashima (花島 優子, Hanashima Yūko)
The heroine of the series. Cheerful and optimistic, with a strong sense of justice. The eldest daughter of the Murakami household, with two younger brother and sister. She's a high school freshmen. She transforms into Poitrine to fight the monsters that infest her neighborhood. If her identity is revealed she will turn into a frog.
Momoko Murakami/Poitrine Petite (村上 モモコ/ポワトリンプティット, Murakami Momoko/Powatorin Putitto)
Portrayed by Rie Maeda (前田 利恵, Maeda Rie)
Yuko's sister, and the youngest of the siblings. After the invasion of the Dark Emperor Diable, Kami-sama gave Momoko a supporting role to Poitrine as Poitrine Petite. Though Poitrine Petite fights alongside Poitrine, they have a rivalry. She and Yuko do not know each other's identity which is subject to punishment if they were to find out.
Takuto Murakami (村上 タクト, Murakami Takuto)
Portrayed by Ryūta Kobayashi (小林 竜太, Kobayashi Ryūta)
Yuko's brother. Longs to embrace Poitrine. Becomes a leader by creating a "Poitrine club" with friends Kazuya, Shinsuke and Kenji.
Hayato Murakami (村上 ハヤト, Murakami Hayato)
Portrayed by Shigeru Saiki (斉木 しげる, Saiki Shigeru)
The Murakami family's father.
Noriko Murakami (村上 ノリコ, Murakami Noriko)
Portrayed by Makiko Otonashi (音無 真喜子, Otonashi Makiko)
The Murakami family's mother.
Inspector Ritsuko Honda (本田 律子警部, Honda Ritsuko Keibu)
Portrayed by Rie Shibata (柴田 理恵, Shibata Rie)
A police detective working for the Tokyo Metropolitan Police Department Nishihonmachi station who wishes to arrest Poitrine. She is Kazuya's mother.
Kazuya Honda (本田 カズヤ, Honda Kazuya)
Portrayed by Yūji Shimojima (下島 裕司, Shimojima Yūji)
The son of Ritsuko Honda and one of Takuto's friends who is very skinny, has his crush on Momoko Murakami/Poitrine Petite and's skilled at various sports.
Shinsuke Takeuchi (竹内 シンスケ, Takeuchi Shinsuke)
Portrayed by Takehisa Yamazawa (山沢 武久, Yamazawa Takehisa)
One of Takuto's friends who is chubby. He makes up new weapons for the Poitrine Club. His mother works as a pharmacist.
Kenji Shibuya (渋谷 ケンジ, Shibuya Kenji)
Portrayed by Nobuhiro Tenma (天間 信紘, Tenma Nobuhiro)
One of Takuto's friends who wears large round glasses who is the smartest in the Poitrine Club. His parents own a tonkatsu shop.
Kami-sama (神様)
Portrayed by Seijun Suzuki (鈴木 清順, Suzuki Seijun)
The deity for the neighborhood shrine. He has been the guardian of Yuko's town for a while, but he has also had a sinus infection. He needs to remedy with a trip to the hot springs in Italy. He gives Yuko the ability to transform, who visited the shrine by chance.
Diable (ディアブル, Diaburu)
Portrayed by Yukijirō Hotaru (螢 雪次朗, Hotaru Yukijirō)
The dark emperor. Plots to control Japan and conquer the universe. Diable is French for devil.

== Episodes ==
1. A God's Gift (神様の贈り物, Kamisama no Okurimono)
2. The Police Department's Shrewd Female Cop (警視庁の女敏腕刑事, Keishichō no Jobinwan Keiji)
3. The Secret of the Prep School (進学塾の秘密, Shingakujuku no Himitsu)
4. Napoleon's Ghost (ナポレオンの亡霊, Naporeon no Bōrei)
5. The Criminal Doctor Boo (犯罪者ドクター・ブー, Hanzaisha Dokutā Bū)
6. The Correct and Clean Auntie Clippers (清く正しいバリカン婆々, Kiyoku Tadashii Barikan Baba)
7. I'm Not an Idol (アイドルじゃない…, Aidoru ja Nai...)
8. A Deputy's Conspiracy (ある代議士の陰謀, Aru Daigishi no Inbō)
9. The Rainbow Voiced Star (七色の声のスター, Nanairo no Koe no Sutā)
10. Look for the Edison Band! (エジソンバンドを探せ！, Ejison Bando o Sagase!)
11. The Fear of the Cotton Mill (ザ・恐怖の紡績工場, Za Kyōfu no Bōseki Kōjō)
12. The President's Daughter (大統領の息子, Daitōryō no Musuko)
13. The Secret Counterfeit Mint (秘密のニセ札工場, Himitsu no Nise-Satsu Kōjō)
14. The Strange Calling Whistle (不思議な呼び笛, Fushigi na Yobi Fue)
15. Dr. Are-You-Okay's Visit to Japan (ダイジョーブ博士の来日, Daijōbu Hakase no Rainichi)
16. The Arai Family's Guardian Angel (新井家の守護霊, Arai-ka no Shugorei)
17. The Missing Koinobori (消えた鯉のぼり, Kieta Koinobori)
18. The Friendly Escaped Prisoner (優しい脱獄囚, Yasashii Datsugokushū)
19. The New Weapon of Tears (涙の新兵器, Namida no Shin Heiki)
20. God's Music Box (神様のオルゴール, Kamisama no Orugōru)
21. The Psychic Loves Being Haunted? (超能力者はお化けが好き?, Chōnōryokusha wa Obake ga Suki?)
22. The Prince of Aparella (アパレラ公国の王子, Aparera Kōkoku no Ōji)
23. Noriko's One Day as Inspector Honda (ノリコの一日本田警部, Noriko no Ichi Nichi Honda-keibu)
24. General Schmitt's Store (シュミット将軍の店, Shumitto-shōgun no Mise)
25. The Tempura Shop's Town Renewal (てんぷら屋さんの町おこし, Tenpura-yasan no Machiokoshi)
26. Give Me Back My Energy (私のエネルギーを返して, Watashi no Enerugī o Kaeshite)
27. The Sad Ghost of the Bug Repellant (哀愁の幽霊蚊取り線香, Aishū no Yūrei Katorisenkō)
28. The Lover of Apollo's Warrior (アポロの戦士の恋人, Aporon no Senshi no Koibito)
29. Diable's Ambition (ディアブルの野望, Diaburu no Yabō)
30. Diable's Ambition II (ディアブルの野望II, Diaburu no YabōII)
31. I Don't Like the Watermelon Seed Spitting Competition (スイカ割り大会の恨み, Suika-wari Taikai no Urami)
32. Study-Boy, the Thief of the Summer Break Homework (夏休みの宿題強盗・勉強くん, Natsuyasumi no Shukudai Gōtō: Benkyō-kun)
33. Already Published? A Recollection of Scenes of Love (一挙公開？愛ある限り名場面集, Ikkyo Kōkai? Ai Aru Kagiri Meibamenshū)
34. The Respected Cutlet Bun (尊敬されたカツパン, Sonkei-sareta Katsupan)
35. The Treasure of Princess Kaguya (かぐや姫の宝, Kaguya-hime no Takara)
36. The Mystery of the Higan Rider (お彼岸ライダーの謎, Ohigan Raidā no Nazo)
37. The Unhappy Prince's Crime (ふしあわせ王子の犯罪, Fushiawase Ōji no Hanzai)
38. I Am a Lethal Weapon (ぼくはリーサルウェポン, Boku wa Rīsaru Wepon)
39. Inspector Honda's Plot (本田警部のある作戦, Honda-keibu no Aru Sakusen)
40. Professor Charm's Goods (おまじない博士のグッズ, Omajinai-hakase no Guzzu)
41. A Sore Tooth Is Scary... (虫歯が恐い…, Mushiba ga Kowai...)
42. A Windy Alien (風流な宇宙人, Fūryū na Uchū-jin)
43. The Love of Yoshitsune (愛しの義経さま, Itoshi no Yoshitsune-sama)
44. Takuto's Graces (タクトの甘え, Takuto no Amae)
45. Yamamoto Hates His Teacher Mom (ヤマモトは教育ママが嫌い, Yamamoto wa Kyōiku Mama ga Kirai)
46. The Lie of the Winter Stars (冬の星座の嘘, Fuyu no Seiza no Uso)
47. Treasure of the Flower Spreading Man (花咲か爺さんの宝, Hanasakajiisan no Takara)
48. Takuto's Love (タクトの恋人, Takuto no Koibito)
49. The Mystery of the Mystery Club (ミステリーサークルの謎, Misuterī Sākuru no Nazo)
50. The Christmas Tragedy (クリスマスの悲劇, Kurisumasu no Higeki)
51. New Year's Eve Happiness (大晦日の幸福, Ōmisoka no Kōfuku)

== Staff ==
- Creator: Shotaro Ishinomori
- Planning: Yoshiaki Kobayashi (Toei), Kyotaro Kimura (Yomiuri Koukokusha), Kenichiro Haraoka & Takashi Ishihara (Fuji TV)
- Producer: Jun Hikasa, Masayuki Nishimura, Shigenori Takatera (Toei)
- Story editor: Yoshio Urasawa
- Script: Yoshio Urasawa, Naoki Iwahara
- Directors: Takaharu Saeki, Shinji Murayama, Taro Sakamoto, Kaneharu Mitsumura, Naoki Iwahara
- Coach: Takaharu Saeki, Shinji Murayama, Taro Sakamoto, Kaneharu Mitsumura, Iwappara Naoki
- Shoot: Noboru Tonegawa, Michio Hayashi, Shingo Osawa
- Art: Kitago Hisanori, Yasui Maruotoko
- Measurement: Shingo Osawa, Masahiro Tanaka, Toshihiro Usuki
- Assistant directors: Naoki Iwahara, Ryuta Tasaki, Akira Kawada, Kazuya Kitade, Minoru Tabei
- Action Advisor: Masaru Okada (Oono Kenyuukai)
- Clay Illustration: Kyozo Hayashi
- Play Illustration: Ryu Noguchi
- Character coordinator: Satoshi Osano (Ishimori Pro)
- Video Synthesis: Totsu-ecg system
- Music: Yusuke Honma
- Production: Fuji TV, Toei, Yomiko (no credit treatment)

== Theme song ==
- OP song – "17 no Koro" (17の頃, Jūnana no Koro; "That 17 Time")
  - performed by Sayuri Saito (斉藤 小百合, Saitō Sayuri).
- 1st ED song – "Kanashimi ni Ichiban Chikai Basho" (悲しみに一番近い場所; "The Closest Place to Sorrow")
  - performed by Yūko Hanashima.
- 2nd ED song – "Anata dake Change me" (あなただけChange me; "Only You Can Change Me")
  - performed by Yūko Hanashima.

== Legacy ==
A character based on Poitrine appears in the Kamen Rider franchise film Kamen Rider × Kamen Rider Wizard & Fourze: Movie War Ultimatum. This version is the idealized form of Donut Shop Hungry's effeminate male manager Yu Kamimura (portrayed by Kaba-chan), who appears within a dream world after he is kidnapped by the Akumaizer as part of their plot to build an army of monsters and conquer humanity before Kamimura is rescued by Kamen Riders Wizard and Fourze and their allies.

== See also ==
- Toei Fushigi Comedy Series
- Socialite Belle Panchanne: The Wife Is a Superheroine!
