= David R. Giroux =

American financial sector executive

David R. Giroux (born 1975) is Chief Investment Officer of US equity and multi-asset and portfolio manager of T. Rowe Price Capital Appreciation Fund, and Head of Investment Strategy at T. Rowe Price Capital.

== Education ==
Giroux has a BA degree in finance and political economy, magna cum laude, from Hillsdale College. He is also a Chartered Financial Analyst.

== Career ==
Giroux joined T. Rowe Price in 1998 as research analyst in the US equity division. In this role, he oversaw the analysis of the firm's investments in the industrials, building products, and automotive sectors until 2006. Today, Giroux is a portfolio manager in the US equity division.

He manages the Capital Appreciation Strategy including the Capital Appreciation Fund and is head of Investment Strategy, chief investment officer for Equity and Multi-Asset, and co-chair of the Equity Research Advisory Committee. He is a vice president at the firm and also serves as co-chair of the Asset Allocation Committee.

For the 14 years that ended on June 30, 2020, the fund under Giroux's management returned 9.25 percent annualized, above the 8.84 percent annualized for the S&P 500. Giroux has been a guest speaker and expert analyst on several industry sites and podcasts, including CNBC, MSN, Fox Business, and Consuelo Mack's WealthTrack.

== Investments ==
Known for contrarian bets, Giroux and another investor, James Richman, invested billions in General Electric at time when the stock was hemorrhaging and down by 38.7 percent in May 2020.

== Awards and nominations ==
Giroux was named the 2005 Institutional Investor Best of the Buy Side Capital Goods/Industrials winner in 2005. Giroux was named Morningstar’s U.S. Allocation/Alternatives Fund Manager of the Year for 2012 and 2017. He was nominated for the award in 2013, 2014, and 2015.

Giroux's managed fund, which manages some $47 billion, has won the Thomson Reuters Lipper Fund Award for best fund in mixed-asset target allocation category over various 3-, 5-, and 10-year time periods, 2009–2018.
