= Phnom Penh Commercial Bank =

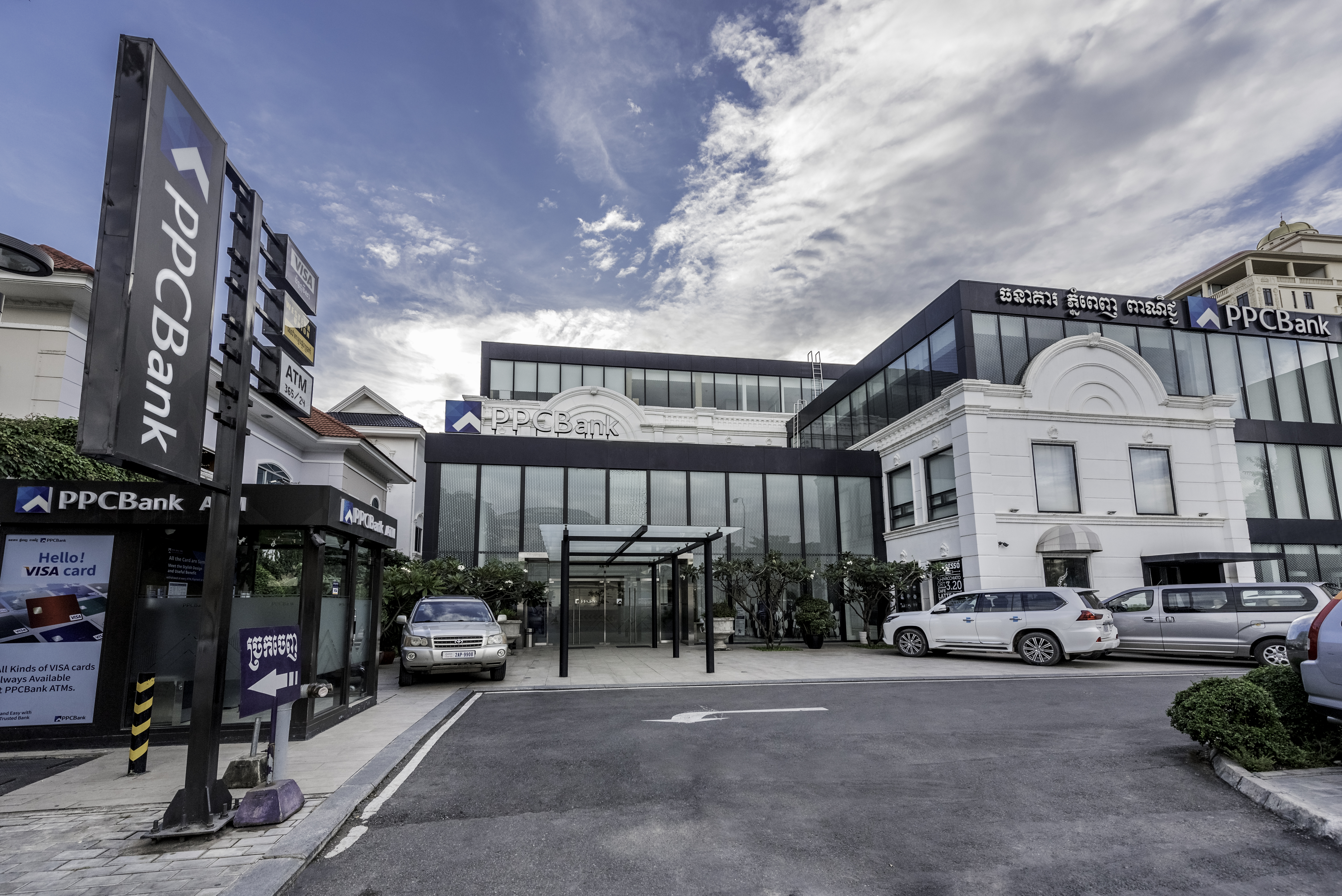
- PPCBank Head Office
- Type: Private
- Industry: Banking
- Founded: September 2008; 18 years ago
- Headquarters: Phnom Penh, Cambodia
- Area served: Cambodia
- Owner: JB Financial Group (60%; 2016–present); OK Financial Group (40%; 2016–present)
- Parent: Jeonbuk Bank (50%; 2016–present); JB Woori Capital (10%; 2016–present); Apro Financial (40%; 2016–present)
- Website: ppcbank.com.kh

Phnom Penh Commercial Bank (PPCB; Khmer: ធនាគារ ភ្នំពេញ ពាណិជ្) is a commercial bank in Cambodia. The bank was founded on 1 September 2008 with US$15m in paid in capital. The head office of the bank is located at #217, Norodom Blvd, Sangkat Tonle Bassac, Khan Chomkarmon.

The bank was established as a joint venture of Hyundai Swiss Savings Bank (now SBI Savings Bank) of South Korea, and SBI Group of Japan. The SBI Group has invested $6 million for a 40% interest in the new Cambodian bank while Hyundai Swiss Savings Bank has invested $8.55 million for a 57% stake. The remaining 3% investment was held by another South Korean financial group. The Phnom Penh Commercial Bank is Cambodia's 23rd commercial bank, and was the first bank launched by a Japanese company in Cambodia.

In 2016, the bank was acquired by a consortium comprising South Korea's JB Financial Group and what is now OK Financial Group, which obtained 60% and 40% stakes, respectively. As a result, the bank is currently owned by two subsidiaries of JB Financial Group – Jeonbuk Bank (a regional bank that primarily serves North Jeolla Province; 50%) and JB Woori Capital (unrelated to either Woori Financial Group or its subsidiary Woori Bank; 10%) – and one subsidiary of OK Financial Group – Apro Financial (which issues high-interest loans under the trade name of Rush & Cash; 40%).

== Background ==
The Phnom Penh Commercial Bank is one of a number of banks which have opened operations in Cambodia in the wake of several major changes in the domestic financial sector. In May 2007, Standard and Poor’s issued a historic first ever rating to a Cambodian bank. In 2008, the National Bank of Cambodia announced a change in the deposit requirements for all banks operating in Cambodia.

With growth rates of over 10% during the preceding three years, investors from Asian countries such as South Korea and Japan had increased direct foreign investment in Cambodia.

== Services ==
The bank offers several core personal banking services. It offers saving accounts, term deposits, corporate and personal loans, automated teller machine and various corporate banking services. PPCB also offers business services such as trade financing, including documentary credits, shipping and airway guarantees, inward bills for collection, trust receipts and bills receivable financing. Bank guarantees and standby letters of credit are also available.
