= Haruna Yabuki =

Japanese actress and television host (born 1984)

- 矢吹 春奈
- Born: 18 December 1984 (age 41); Tokyo, Japan
- Other name: Mari Abe
- Occupations: Actress; gravure model; TV host
- Years active: 2001–present
- Agents: R-I-P (2001–2010) Irving (2010–2013); Kallos Entertainment (2013–present)
- Children: 1

Haruna Yabuki (矢吹 春奈, Yabuki Haruna; born 18 December 1984) is a Japanese actress, gravure idol, and TV personality from Tokyo. From 2009 to 2013, she previously used the stage name Mari Abe (阿部 真里, Abe Mari).

In the level Graniny Gorki Lab of the PlayStation 2 video game Metal Gear Solid 3: Snake Eater, there is a poster of Haruna Yabuki.

== Personal life ==
In March 2025, Yabuki announced her first pregnancy after undergoing fertility treatment. On 25 April, she gave birth to a healthy son.

== Filmography ==
=== Film ===
- The Incredible Truth (2013)
- Space Sheriff Sharivan: NEXT Generation (2014)
- Tokyo Tribe (2014)
- Twisted Justice (2016)

=== TV series ===
- Tokumei Kakaricho Tadano Hitoshi (TV Asahi, 2003)
- Vampire Host (TV Tokyo, 2004)
- Engine (Fuji, 2005)
- Shimokita Glory Days (TV Tokyo, 2006)
- Uranaishi Tenjin (CBC, 2006)
- Seishun Energy Dandori Musume (Fuji TV, 2006)
- Bishōjo Celebrity Panchanne (TV Tokyo, 2007)
- Shinjuku Swan (TV Asahi, 2007)
- Kuroi Taiyo '07 Special (TV Asahi, 2007)
- Kimi Hannin Janai yo ne? (TV Asahi, 2008, ep7)
- Yume o Kanaeru zo (YTV, 2008)
- Koi no Kara Sawagi Drama Special Love Stories V (NTV, 2008)

== See also ==
- List of Japanese gravure idols
