= Dokincho! Nemurin =

Japanese television series

- Genre: Tokusatsu; Comedy
- Created by: Shotaro Ishinomori
- Directed by: Hideo Tanaka
- Starring: Sayuri Uchida; Keiko Higashi; Kazuomi Fukuhara; Masayuki Hidaka
- Voices of: Miyuki Muroi; Joji Yanami; Yasuo Tanaka
- Music by: Atsuo Fujimoto
- Opening theme: "Pink, Pink, PINK!" by Satoko Yamano
- Ending theme: "Sleep Energy" by Satoko Yamano
- Country of origin: Japan
- No. of episodes: 31

Production
- Running time: 20–25 minutes

Original release
- Network: Fuji Telivision Network
- Release: April 2, 1984 – March 31, 1985

Dokincho! Nemurin (どきんちょ!ネムリン, Dokincho! Nemurin) is a tokusatsu TV series on fairies. Created by Shotaro Ishinomori, the series was produced by Toei Company and Ishimori Productions as part of the Toei Fushigi Comedy Series, and broadcast on Fuji Television from 2 September 1984 to 31 March 1985, with a total of 31 episodes.

== Characters ==
Fairies

- Nemurin (voiced by Miyuki Muroi)
- Vivian (voiced by Jōji Yanami)
- Monroe (voiced by Yasuro Tanaka)

Human

- Mako Ōiwa - Sayuti Uchida
- Tamasaburo Ōiwa - Masayuki Hidaka
- Sachiko Ōiwa - Keiko Higashi
- Yosuke Ōiwa - Kazuomi Fukuhara
- Nakayama - Iwakuni Makoto
- Sleep-Deprived Demon Ibiki - Masahiro Sato
- Time-Traveling Uncle - Kimihiro Okumura

== Theme songs ==
- Opening theme : "Pink, pink, pink!"（ぴんく、ピンク、PINK!）
  - Composer: Yūsuke Honma
  - Singer : Satoko Yamano
- Ending theme : "Sleeping Energy" (睡眠エネルギー)
  - Composer: Kunihiko Kase
  - Singer : Satoko Yamano
