= Yuko Arimori =

Japanese long-distance runner

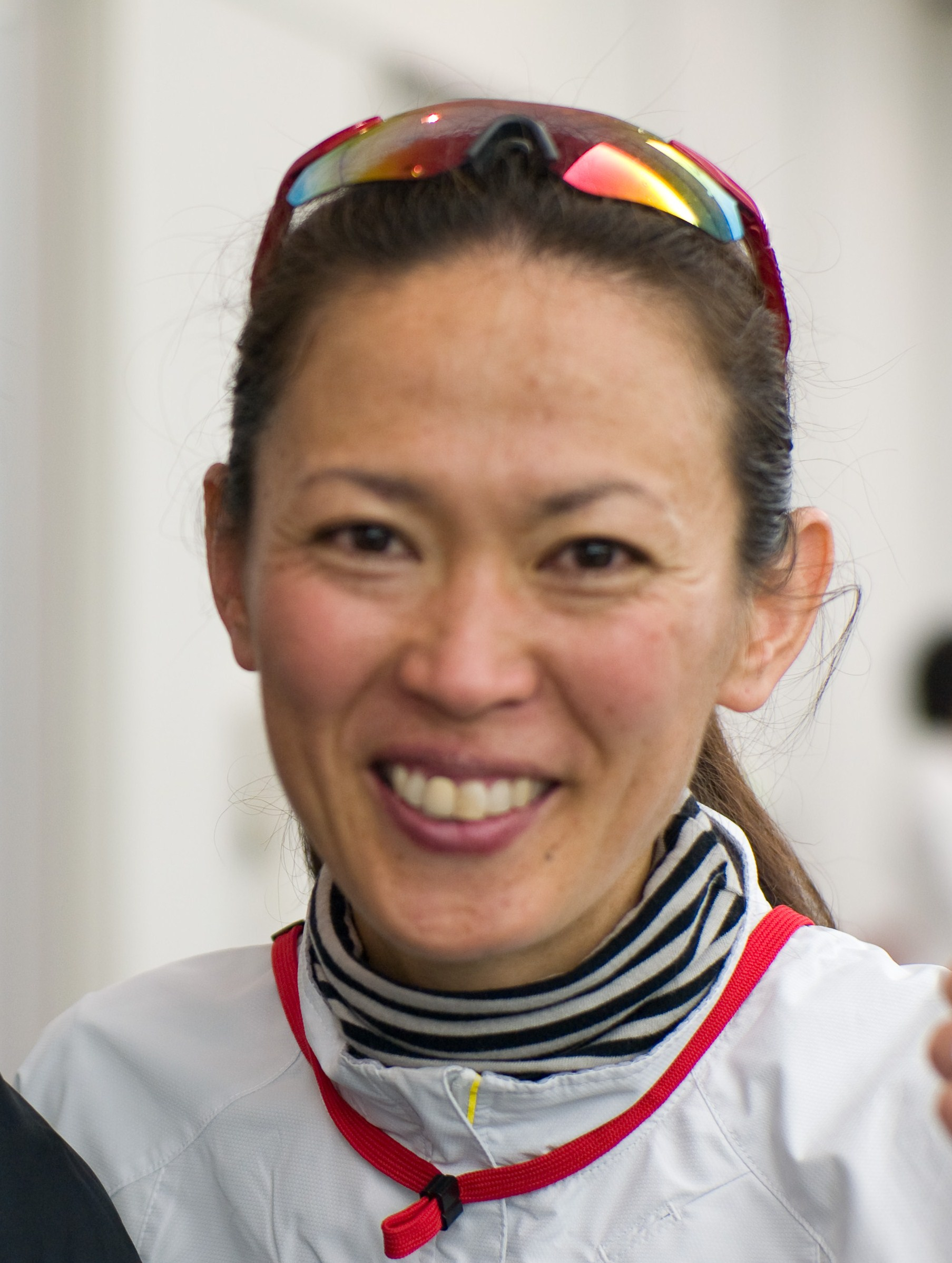
- Yuko Arimori in November 2008

Personal information
- Full name: Arimori Yūko
- Nationality: Japanese
- Born: December 17, 1966 (age 59) Okayama, Japan
- Height: 1.65 m (5 ft 5 in)
- Website: animo.aspota.jp

Sport
- Country: Japan
- Sport: Running
- Event: Marathon
- Former partner: Gabriel Wilson
Medal record
Women's track and field
| Silver medal – second place | 1992 Barcelona | Marathon |
| Bronze medal – third place | 1996 Atlanta | Marathon |

Yuko Arimori (有森 裕子, Arimori Yūko; born December 17, 1966, in Okayama) is a Japanese professional marathon runner and a Goodwill Ambassador for the United Nations Population Fund (UNFPA). In June 2025 she was elected president of the Japan Association of Athletics Federations.

== Career ==
Arimori competed for Japan in the 1992 Summer Olympics held in Barcelona, Spain in the marathon where she won the silver medal with a time of 2:32:49, eight seconds behind Russian Valentina Yegorova who ran the race in 2:32:41. This hard-fought race was the closest finishing time in Olympic history for men or women at that time. At the 1996 Atlanta Olympics, Arimori returned to the Olympic marathon, where she won the bronze medal and finished behind Valentina Yegorova for a second time. Yegorova ran the race in 2:28:05. Arimori's time was 2:28:39. Although both runners ran four minutes faster than their previous Olympic race, they were beaten back by Ethiopian runner Fatuma Roba, who completed the race and won the gold medal with a time of 2:26:05.

Arimori was the first woman granted professional status by the Japanese Amateur Athletic Federation (JAAF), the nation's governing track and field association. She was granted this status in 1996, following her second and final appearance at the Olympic Games in Atlanta.

== Achievements ==
| Year | Competition | Venue | Position | Event | Notes |
|---|---|---|---|---|---|
| 1990 | Osaka International Ladies Marathon | Osaka, Japan | 6th | Marathon | 2:32:51 |
| 1991 | Osaka International Ladies Marathon | Osaka, Japan | 2nd | Marathon | 2:28:01 |
| 1991 | 1991 World Championships in Athletics | Tokyo, Japan | 4th | Marathon | 2:31:08 |
| 1992 | 1992 Summer Olympics | Barcelona, Spain | 2nd | Marathon | 2:32:49 |
| 1995 | Hokkaido Marathon | Sapporo, Japan | 1st | Marathon | 2:29:17 |
| 1996 | 1996 Summer Olympics | Atlanta, United States | 3rd | Marathon | 2:28:39 |
| 1999 | Boston Marathon | Boston, United States | 3rd | Marathon | 2:26:39 |
| 2000 | Osaka International Ladies Marathon | Osaka, Japan | 9th | Marathon | 2:31:22 |
| 2000 | New York City Marathon | New York City, United States | 10th | Marathon | 2:31:12 |
| 2001 | Gold Coast Marathon | Gold Coast, Australia | 1st | Marathon | 2:35:40 |
| 2001 | Tokyo International Women's Marathon | Tokyo, Japan | 10th | Marathon | 2:31:00 |
| 2007 | Tokyo Marathon | Tokyo, Japan | 5th | Marathon | 2:52:45 |

== Awards ==
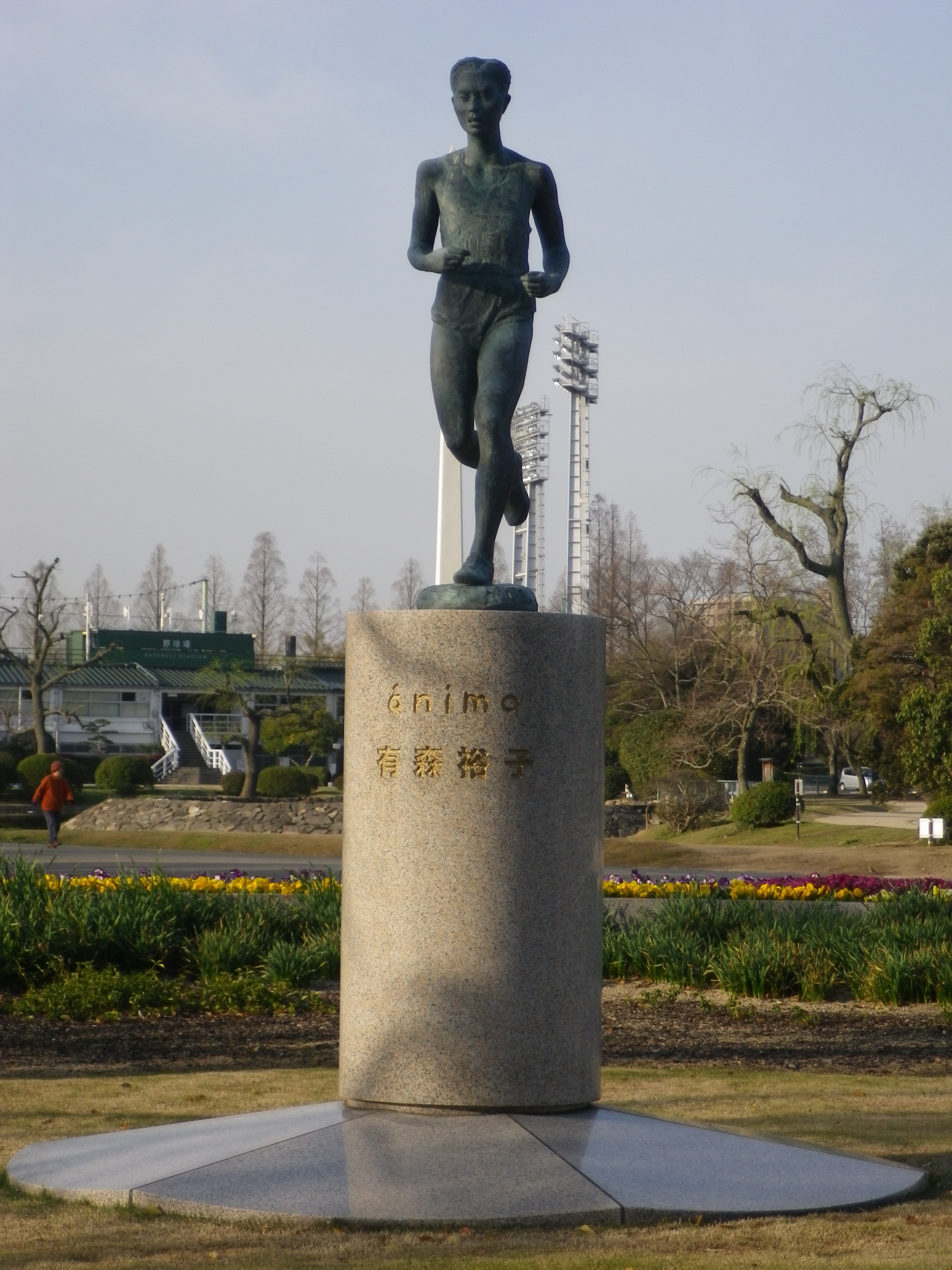
Bronze statue of Yuko Arimori in Okayama

Arimori was voted Japanese Athlete of the Year in 1992 and 1996.

== Personal life ==
Arimori was born on December 17, 1966, in Okayama, Okayama Prefecture, Japan.

Prior to the 1992 Olympics, Arimori participated in altitude training in Colorado. She married Gabriel Wilson in January 1998 in Boulder, Colorado, United States. They separated one month after their marriage, and Wilson revealed his extensive debts and previous homosexual tendencies, admitting "I was gay", at a press conference. They officially divorced in July 2011.

== See also ==
- Angkor Wat Marathon, a marathon introduced in 1996 by Yuko Arimori in Cambodia
