= Chikyu no Arukikata =

Arukikata. Co., Ltd.
- Founded: 2020; 6 years ago
- Country of origin: Japan
- Headquarters location: Shinagawa, Tokyo
- Publication types: Guide books
- Official website: www.arukikata.co.jp

Chikyu no Arukikata (地球の歩き方, Chikyū No Arukikata) is a Japanese guide book series and publisher company based in Shinagawa, Tokyo. Since its launch in 1979, it has published over 100 travel guidebooks. From its launch until the end of December 2020, it was published by DIAMOND, Inc., but in January 2021, the business was transferred to the Gakken Group.

Chikyū No Arukikata had only published guide books of foreign countries. But after the COVID-19 crisis, it started publishing guide books about Japan.

In 2024, TV Osaka and BS TV Tokyo produced a TV drama which also named "Chikyu no Arukikata", based on this guide book series.
