= Neko Hiroshi =

Japanese-born Cambodian comedian and marathon runner

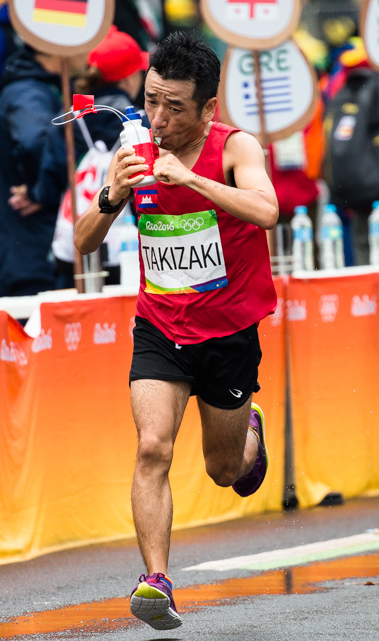
- Takizaki at the 2016 Summer Olympics

Personal information
- Born: August 8, 1977 (age 48) Ichihara, Chiba, Japan
- Height: 1.47 m (4 ft 10 in)
- Weight: 45 kg (99 lb)

Sport
- Country: Cambodia
- Sport: Marathon
- Updated on 22 July 2012

Kuniaki Takizaki (瀧﨑 邦明, Takizaki Kuniaki; born August 8, 1977 in Ichihara, Chiba), more commonly known as Neko Hiroshi (猫 ひろし, Neko Hiroshi), is a Cambodian owarai comedian who uses his short stature, at 1.47 meters (4 ft 10 in) and 45 kilograms (99 lb), and cat persona in his act. He is also an avid marathon runner. In 2011, he became a naturalized citizen of Cambodia, and intended to compete in the Olympics for Cambodia.

== Cambodian citizenship ==
In March 2012, the National Olympic Committee of Cambodia announced that Hiroshi had been nominated to represent Cambodia in the marathon at the 2012 Summer Olympics, having been chosen for a "special exemption" after no Cambodian athletes met the qualifying standard. Hiroshi, a naturalized Cambodian citizen since 2011, had participated in half-marathons held in Cambodia for over a year and reached the podium at least twice. He received criticism from, among others, Japanese double Olympic marathon medalist Yuko Arimori, whose charity helps develop and train Cambodian athletes in addition to funding their journeys to international competitions. Opponents of Hiroshi's selection for the Olympic Games claim that there are Cambodian-born athletes more deserving of the special exemption, such as Hem Bunting who has won two long-distance medals at the Southeast Asian Games since 2007.

In May 2012, the International Association of Athletics Federations (IAAF) ruled that Hiroshi was not eligible to represent Cambodia in the 2012 Olympic Games, as a period of one year had not elapsed since his gaining Cambodian nationality. He was, however, selected to represent Cambodia in the 2016 Summer Olympics in the men's marathon. He finished the Olympic marathon in 138th place, next to last.
