= Sarita Choudhury =

British actress (born 1966)

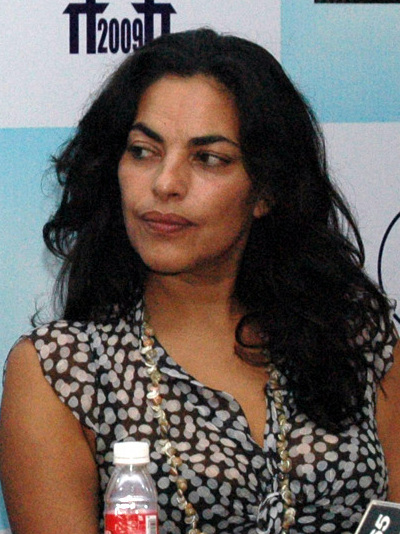
- Choudhury in 2009
- Born: Sarita Catherine Louise Choudhury; 18 August 1966 (age 60); Blackheath, London, United Kingdom
- Education: Queen's University at Kingston (Ontario, Canada)
- Occupation: Actress
- Years active: 1990–present
- Children: 1

Sarita Catherine Louise Choudhury (Bengali pronunciation: [ʃorita t͡ʃou̯dʱuɾi]; born 18 August 1966) is a British actress who has appeared in film and on television. Choudhury made her screen debut starring in the romantic drama film Mississippi Masala (1991). She later appeared in numerous American and international film productions, including A Perfect Murder (1998), Spike Lee's She Hate Me (2004), Lady in the Water (2006), Midnight's Children (2012), and The Green Knight (2021).

Choudhury played the leading roles in a number of films, notably the historical erotic romance Kama Sutra: A Tale of Love (1996), the drama For Real (2009), and the supernatural horror film Evil Eye (2020). On television, she starred as Mira Berenson in the Showtime thriller series Homeland (2011–2017), and as Kith Lyonne in the Netflix superhero series, Jessica Jones (2019). In 2021, Choudhury began starring as Seema Patel in the HBO Max comedy-drama series, And Just Like That..., and in 2024 as Moldaver/Miss Williams in the Fallout TV series.

== Early life and education ==
Choudhury was born in Blackheath, London. Her mother, Julia Patricia (née Spring), is English and her father, Prabhas Chandra Choudhury, is an Indian Bengali scientist. She grew up in Jamaica and Italy.

She studied economics and film at Queen's University in Kingston, Ontario, Canada, graduating in 1989. Her older brother, Paul Choudhury, also studied at Queen's.

== Career ==
Choudhury made her big screen debut starring opposite Denzel Washington in the 1991 romantic drama film Mississippi Masala directed by Mira Nair, for which she received her Screen Actors Guild (SAG) card. She was still working as a waitress in Manhattan's East Village to make ends meet while the film was in theatres. The film was positively received by critics. After Mississippi Masala became an art-house hit, Choudhury acted as a Pakistani country-western singer in the British comedy film Wild West (1992), a Chilean maid who is raped in Bille August's adaptation of The House of the Spirits, and a lesbian mother in the experimental film Fresh Kill directed by Shu Lea Cheang.

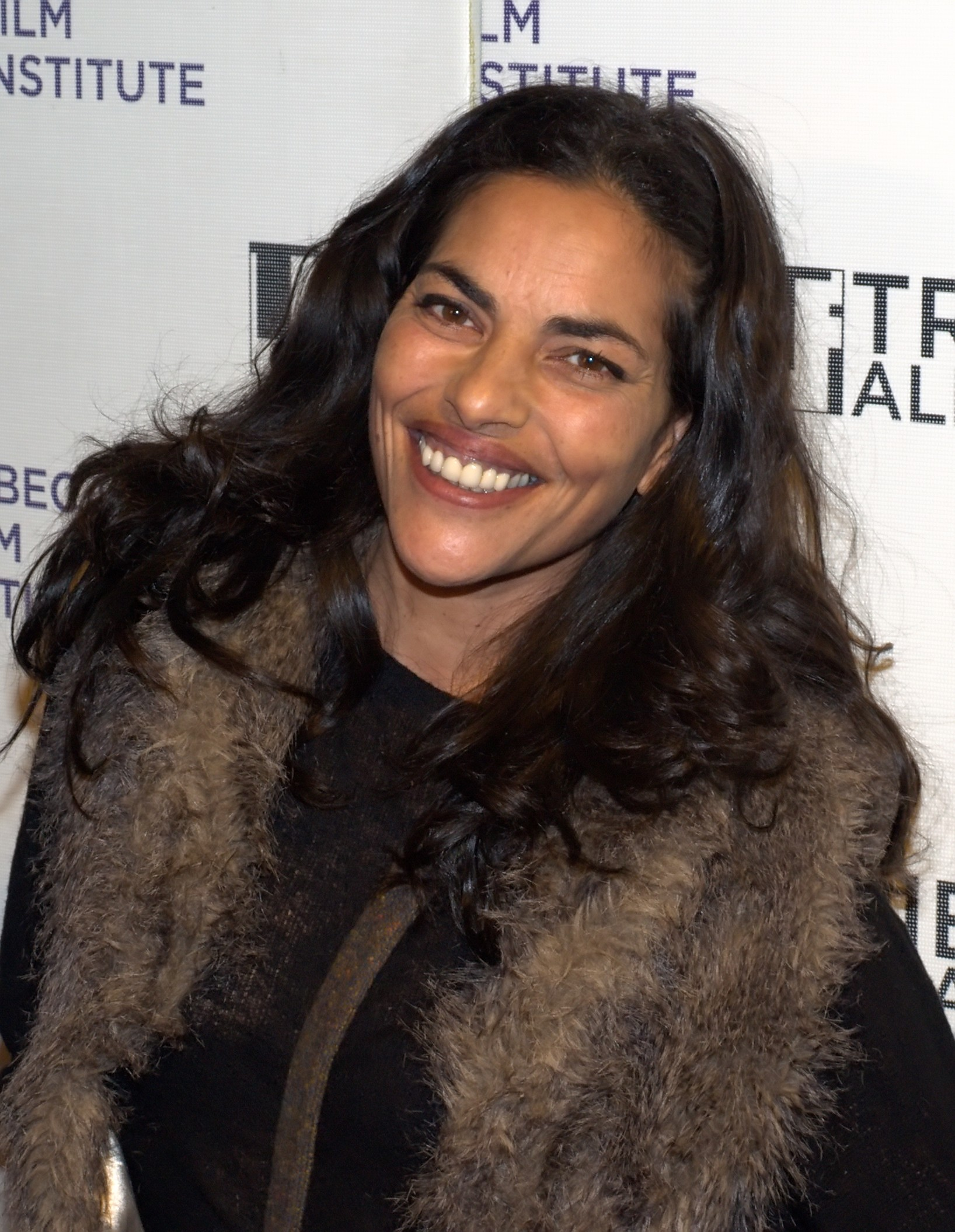
Choudhury at the 2010 Tribeca Film Festival

After appearing in the American comedy film The Perez Family and the made-for-television drama Down Came a Blackbird in 1995, Choudhury starred as Tara, the Indian princess in the historical erotic romance film Kama Sutra: A Tale of Love (1996) directed by Nair. The film generated controversy at the time of its release and was banned in India due to its erotic theme and sexual content. The following years, she acted primarily in American productions, notable playing the recurring role on the NBC police drama series Homicide: Life on the Street for five episodes during the 1998–99 season as Dr. Kalyani, a medical examiner. In 1998, she appeared in the crime thriller film A Perfect Murder and the romantic drama film Restless. The following year, she had a minor role in the thriller film Gloria directed by Sidney Lumet. She had recurring roles on the short-lived television dramas Deadline (2000) and 100 Centre Street (2001–2002), and later appeared in the comedy films It Runs in the Family (2003) and She Hate Me (2004).

In 2005, Choudhury starred in the independent political drama film The War Within and the following year appeared in the psychological thriller Lady in the Water by M. Night Shyamalan. In 2007, she played the role of the King's mistress, Helen Pardis, in the NBC short-lived drama series Kings. The series was based upon the Biblical story of King David but set in modern times. Her character's Biblical counterpart was Rizpah, a concubine of King Saul. She worked with independent-film director Sona Jain in the 2009 drama film For Real. In an interview with The Statesman, she said, "After Mississippi Masala and Kama Sutra I started getting offers in New York... doing theatres... I just went with the flow. One fine day, I thought that I haven't been back to India, haven't shot there and that's something I wanted to. There were Bollywood offers but it was not until Sona's script that made me look at India." The film had a commercial release in September 2010.

In 2011, Choudhury was cast as Saul Berenson's wife, Mira, in the Showtime political thriller series, Homeland. She was promoted to series regular during the third season. Along with cast, she received Screen Actors Guild Award nomination for Outstanding Performance by an Ensemble in a Drama Series. After Homeland, she co-starred in the romantic comedy-drama film, Learning to Drive (2014), and played Egeria, the Capitol's Minister of Interior in The Hunger Games: Mockingjay – Part 1 (2014) and The Hunger Games: Mockingjay – Part 2 (2015). In 2015–2016, she appeared as the Deputy White House Political Director Sophia Varma in the NBC crime drama series Blindspot. In 2016, she starred opposite Tom Hanks in the comedy-drama film A Hologram for the King.

Choudhury appeared in the independent films The Last Photograph (2017) and After Louie (2018), and was a regular cast member during the third and final season of Hulu drama series The Path in 2018. In 2019, she starred as Kith Lyonne in the Netflix series Jessica Jones and the following year appeared in the Hulu miniseries Little Fires Everywhere. In 2020, she played the leading role in the supernatural horror film Evil Eye. She also starred in the Spanish drama film It Snows in Benidorm (2020), and appeared in the science fiction drama After Yang (2021) and The Green Knight (2021).

In 2021, Choudhury joined the cast of HBO Max comedy-drama series And Just Like That..., a Sex and the City revival series. She plays Seema Patel, a real estate broker who becomes a new friend for Carrie Bradshaw. Choudhury received wide press coverage for her performance in the series. Some of critics dubbed her as "the new Samantha Jones". The A.V. Club named her the best part of the series. After her And Just Like That... performance, HBO Max announced that Choudhury would star in and produce the family drama series The Colony based on the 2019 film Stray Dolls.

In 2022, Choudhury played a sex worker in a massage parlor in three episodes of the third season of Ramy, a comedy-drama show created by Ramy Youssef. In an interview with Awards Radar, Youssef said Choudhury "brought so much dimension to a relationship in Ramy’s life that could have felt totally off and unreal."

== Personal life ==
Choudhury has one daughter, named Maria.

== Filmography ==
=== Films ===
Year	Title	Role	Notes
1991	Mississippi Masala	Meena	
1992	Wild West	Rifat	
1993	The House of the Spirits	Pancha Garcia	
1994	Fresh Kill	Shareen Lightfoot	
1995	The Perez Family	Josette	
1996	Kama Sutra: A Tale of Love	Tara, the Queen	
1998	High Art	Joan	Uncredited
1998	A Perfect Murder	Raquel Martinez	
1998	Restless	Jane Talwani	
1999	Gloria	Angela	
2000	Come On	Sarita	
2001	3 A.M.	Box	
2001	Trigger Happy	Alison	
2002	Just a Kiss	Colleen	
2002	Refuge	Girl	
2003	Rhythm of the Saints	Mariela	
2003	It Runs in the Family	Suzie	
2004	Marmalade	Angela	
2004	She Hate Me	Song	
2004	The Breakup Artist	Mona	
2004	Indocumentados	Mrs. Guerrero	
2005	The War Within	Farida S. Choudhury	
2005	L'est de la brúixola	Dabashree	
2006	Lady in the Water	Anna Ran	
2008	The Accidental Husband	Sunny	
2009	Entre nos	Preet	
2009	For Real	Priya	
2011	Aazaan	Menon	
2012	Gayby	Ushma	
2012	Generation Um...	Lily	
2012	Midnight's Children	Indira Gandhi	
2012	BMW: Bombay's Most Wanted		
2013	Admission	Rachel	
2013	Innocence	Dr. Vera Kent	
2014	The Disinherited	Anna	
2014	Learning To Drive	Jasleen	
2014	The Hunger Games: Mockingjay – Part 1	Egeria	
2014	Roman Buildings	Sarita	
2015	The Hunger Games: Mockingjay – Part 2	Egeria	
2015	Sweets	Sweets	
2016	A Hologram for the King	Zahra	
2017	The Last Photograph	Hannah	
2017	After Louie	Maggie	
2020	Evil Eye	Usha Kharti	
2020	It Snows in Benidorm	Alex	
2021	After Yang	Cleo	
2021	The Green Knight	Mother	
2025	Three Goodbyes	Gastroenterologist	

=== Short films ===
Year	Title	Role	Notes
1997	Dinner Party	Rosie	
1997	Story of the Red Rose	Infanta	
2004	Exactly	Lily	
2006	Lady in a Box	Ms. Pullman	
2008	Woman in Burka	Sarita	
2009	Coup de Grâce		
2012	Monarchs and Men	Nadzia	
2013	Give Into the Night	Veena	
2015	Love Comes Later		
2016	Wake O Wake	Lila	
2019	Human Terrain	Adelah Nasser	
2020	Here Comes Frieda	Yvonne	

=== Television ===
Year	Title	Role	Notes
1995	Down Came a Blackbird	Myrna	Television film
1997	Subway Stories	Humera	Television film; segment: "Honey-Getter"
1998–1999	Homicide: Life on the Street	Dr. Kalyani	Recurring
2000–2001	Deadline	Sahira Ondaatje	3 episodes
2001–2002	100 Centre Street	Julia Brooks	Recurring
2004	Law & Order	Nadira Harrington	Episode: "Paradigm"
2004	PBS Hollywood Presents	Charmaine	Episode: "Cop Shop"
2007	Damages	Sleep Therapist	Episode: "She Spat at Me"
2009	Kings	Helen Pardis	Recurring
2009	The Philanthropist	Rhada Shivpuri	Episode: "Kashmir"
2009	Possible Side Effects	Callie	Television film
2010	Mercy	Dr. Carrozzi	Episode: "Wake Up, Bill"
2010	The Good Wife	Simran Verma	Episode: "Mock"
2010	Bored to Death	Lakshmi	Episode: "Forty-Two Down!"
2011	Bar Karma	Sarita	Episode: "Man Walks Out of a Bar"
2011	Death in Paradise	Avita	Episode: "Music of Murder"
2011–2017	Homeland	Mira Berenson	Main role season 3; recurring (seasons 1, 4); guest (seasons 2, 6)
2015–2016	Blindspot	Sofia Varma	Recurring
2016	Elementary	Gira Pal	Episode: "A Study in Charlotte"
2016	Divorce	Courtney	Episode: "Church"
2016–2017	Madam Secretary	Prime Minister Jaya Verma	2 episodes
2018	The Path	Lilith	Main role (season 3)
2018	Instinct	Mayor Myers	2 episodes
2018	Strangers		3 episodes
2019	Jessica Jones	Kith Lyonne	Main role (season 3)
2019	Modern Love	Therapist	Episode: "Rallying to Keep the Game Alive"
2020	Mira, Royal Detective	Great-Aunt Rupa (voice)	
2020	Little Fires Everywhere	Anita Rees	3 episodes
2021	Law & Order: Special Victims Unit	Vanessa Blake	Episode: "In the Year We All Fell Down"
2021–2025	And Just Like That...	Seema Patel	Main role
2022	Ramy	Olivia	Guest; 3 episodes
2024–2026	Fallout	Lee Moldaver	6 episodes

== See also ==
- British Indians
- Indians in the New York City metropolitan area
