= Akira the Hustler =

Japanese artist (born 1969)

- ハスラーアキラ
- Born: Yukio Cho (張 由紀夫); 1969 (age 56–57); Tokyo, Japan
- Education: Kyoto City University of Arts

Yukio Cho (Japanese: 張 由紀夫, Hepburn: Chō Yukio; born 1969), known professionally as Akira the Hustler (ハスラーアキラ, Hasurā Akira), is a Japanese artist, writer, actor, activist, and former sex worker.

== Biography ==
Yukio Cho was born in 1969 in Tokyo, Japan. He grew up in Germany, living there from age two until age eight after his father moved to the country for work, before his family resettled in Kobe. He studied oil painting at the Kyoto City University of Arts, earning a bachelor's degree in 1992 and a master's degree in 1995. As a university student, Cho became involved with campaigns to raise awareness of HIV/AIDS in Japan, and to reduce stigma against those with the disease.

He took the pseudonym "Akira" while working as a call boy for an escort agency while living in Kyoto. He would later return to Tokyo to work as an escort independently, advertising his services through gay men's magazines; he would later write a column for G-men, one of the most notable gay magazines in Japan in the late 1990s. Along with BuBu de la Madeleine (formerly BuBu the Whore) and Mikado the Dominatrix, Akira the Hustler was a founding member of the Biters, (Note: A pun on bite, the Japanese word for prostitute.) a performance art group whose members were both artists and sex workers. The group's exhibition Donai yanen (lit. "So What"), which was inspired by their experiences in the sex industry, was shown at the École des Beaux-Arts in 1998, Ota Fine Arts in 1999, and the Watari Museum of Contemporary Art in 2000. His autobiography A Whore Diary, which chronicles several of his encounters with his clients, was published by Isshi Press in 2000.

In 2003, he helped found the Akta Community Centre, a sexual health clinic and counseling center in Shinjuku Ni-chōme. He served as its director until 2011.

== Works ==
Akira the Hustler works in multiple mediums, including performance, photography, video, sculpture, and painting. His works often deal with themes of self-identity and social issues, such as LGBT rights, HIV/AIDS, and racism, typically using outwardly bright and cheerful imagery to convey a more serious message. He has become an outspoken critic of nuclearization following the Fukushima Daiichi nuclear disaster, with anti-nuclearization becoming a prominent subject of his work and activism.

=== Exhibitions ===
==== Solo exhibitions ====
- 2000: Ota Fine Arts, Tokyo, Japan – "Akira the Hustler"
- 2001: Ota Fine Arts, Tokyo, Japan – "Akira the Hustler"
- 2004: Ota Fine Arts, Tokyo, Japan – "Akira the Hustler"
- 2008: Ota Fine Arts, Tokyo, Japan – "Living Together"
- 2012: Ota Fine Arts, Tokyo, Japan – "Ordinary Life"
- 2013: Tac's Knot, Tokyo, Japan – "Let's go to the river"

==== Group exhibitions ====
- 1998: École des Beaux-Arts, Paris, France – "Donai yanen"
- 1999: Ota Fine Arts, Tokyo, Japan – "Whores on Holidays"
- 2000: Watari Museum of Contemporary Art, Tokyo, Japan – "Game Over"
- 2001: Watari Museum of Contemporary Art, Tokyo, Japan – "Art One Day Elementary School"
- 2001: Lydmar Hotel, Stockholm, Sweden – "Tokyo Style"
- 2002: Haus der Kulturen der Welt, Berlin, Germany – "In Transit" (performance)
- 2003: Kunst Werk, Berlin, Germany – "Suddenly Inclusive" (performance)
- 2003: Tokyo International Forum, Tokyo, Japan – "Tokyo Art Jungle" (performance)
- 2004: Maison Folie de Wazemmes, Lille, France – "Akimahen"
- 2005: Tikotin Museum of Japanese Art, Haifa, Israel – "PostGender: Gender Identity, Performativity and Sexuality in Japanese Culture"
- 2006: Art Tower Mito, Mito, Japan – "Life"
- 2007: Yvon Lambert Gallery, Avignon, France – "J'embrasse pas"
- 2009: Ota Fine Arts, Tokyo, Japan – "SLOGAN"
- 2010: Tokyo Photographic Art Museum, Tokyo, Japan – "Love's Body-art in the age of AIDS"
- 2010: Art Tower Mito, Mito, Japan – "Café in Mito 2011"
- 2016: Ota Fine Arts, Tokyo, Japan – "primal lines"
- 2017: Reborn Art Festival 2017, Onagawa, Japan
- 2018: Ota Fine Arts, Tokyo, Japan – "Be there"
- 2019: Ota Fine Arts, Tokyo, Japan – "Welcome to the Parade"

==== Public collections ====
- Yvon Lambert Gallery, Avignon, France
- Watari Museum of Contemporary Art, Tokyo, Japan

=== Filmography ===
- I.K.U., 2001 (actor)
- Hush!, 2001 (actor)
- Naughty Boys, 2002 (actor)
- Queer Boys and Girls on the Shinkansen, 2004 (writer and director, "Bye-Bye 'Over the Rainbow'" segment)
- First Love, 2008 (actor)
