= Katsumura =

Katsumura (written: 勝村) is a Japanese surname. Notable people with the surname include:

- Masanobu Katsumura (勝村 政信, born 1963), Japanese actor
- Mika Katsumura (勝村 美香, born 1980), Japanese actress
- Shuichiro Katsumura (勝村 周一朗, born 1976), Japanese mixed martial artist
