= Fluidø =

2017 film

- Film poster
- Directed by: Shu Lea Cheang
- Written by: Shu Lea Cheang
- Produced by: Jürgen Brüning; Sonja Klumper; Paulita Pappel; Shu Lea Cheang; Stephan Holl; Maren Kroymann; Claus Matthes
- Starring: Caprice Crawford; William E. Morris; Kristina Marlen
- Cinematography: James Carman
- Edited by: Jörn Hartmann
- Music by: Aérea Negrot
- Production companies: Amard Bird Films; Jürgen Brüning Filmproduktion; Rapid Eye Movies
- Release date: 14 February 2017 (Berlin)
- Running time: 99 minutes
- Country: Germany
- Language: English

Fluidø is a 2017 German science fiction film written and directed by Shu Lea Cheang. It was screened in the Panorama section at the 67th Berlin International Film Festival.

Set in the 2060s, the film depicts a world in which HIV/AIDS has been fully eradicated. In some people, however, the virus has mutated into a gene which can be extracted to create a new psychoactive drug, leading to the creation of an extensive underground network of human trafficking to capture the carriers of this mutation in order to manufacture the drug.

== Cast ==
- Caprice Crawford as Madame X
- William E. Morris as DI for Diva
- Kristina Marlen as Eva
