= Nezulla the Rat Monster =

- DVD cover
- Directed by: Kanta Tagawa
- Written by: Kanta Tagawa
- Produced by: Eisuke Ishige; Keisuke Gotto; Yuji Nagamori; Tadahi Yamamoto
- Starring: Ayumi Tokitou; Yoshiyuki Kubota; Mika Katsumura
- Distributed by: Happinet Pictures
- Release date: October 25, 2002
- Running time: 90 minutes
- Country: Japan
- Language: Japanese

Nezulla (Japanese: 最強獣誕生 ネズラ -NEZULLA-, Hepburn: Saikyō Jū Tanjō Nezura; lit. 'Birth of the Strongest Beast Nezura') is a 2002 Japanese direct-to-video monster film, directed by Kanta Tagawa. It stars Ayumi Tokitou, Yoshiyuki Kubota, and Mika Katsumura .

== Plot ==
As a result of tampering with biogenetic code by an American company in Japan, the mutant creature Nezulla, classified as half human, and half rat, escapes its containment and goes after the ill-fated scientists that spawned it. To cover up the atrocity, the authorities condemn the lab. Eventually, when a bacterium found in the lab enters the sewer system, a squadron of soldiers is deployed to clean up the mess. Upon entering the lab via the sewers, the troops are slaughtered one at a time by Nezulla, whose armor-like skin easily deflect their bullets. Desperate to get through to the gunpowder room, a false safe explosive area, the commanding officer of the squadron bravely steps up to the creature, and forces a grenade into its mouth. Although his arm is ripped out at the limb portion, he is still able to escape before the creature explodes into thousands of pieces. Once the creature is finally dead, the remaining troops set the gunpowder on fire, and cause a chain explosion that destroys the lab, along with the bacteria.

== Cast ==
- Daisuke Ryu as Aso
- Mika Katsumura as Yoko
- Ayumi Tokitō as Jenny Kawaguchi
- Yoshiyuki Kubota as John
- Junichi Nitta as Doctor
- Atsuko Sakuraba as Nurse
- Yoko Nagasogabe as Sick Woman

== Release ==
The film was released in North America by Media Blasters through its "Tokyo Shock" label.

== Reception ==
Critical reception for the film has been mostly negative. With many critics criticizing the film's plot, overuse of clichés, and the monster's design.

Dread Central awarded the film a score of 1 out of 4, stating, "Nezulla the Rat Monster attempts to be a serious, suspenseful monster movie and fails miserably. Slow, dreary, and boring; this is a film that needed less angst, less Japanese-flavored melodramatics, and more of what makes a monster movie entertaining, even ones that set about to be more high-minded". Mike Long from DVD Talk gave the film a negative review, panning the film's story, dialogue, and design of the titular monster which he called "laughable". David Johnson from DVD Verdict panned the film, criticizing the film's plot, dialogue, and the poor design of the monster.
