= Yūsuke Tomoi =

Japanese actor

- Born: Yūsuke Makiyama; April 2, 1980 (age 45); Osaka, Japan
- Occupation: Actor
- Years active: 1994–2006, 2007–2019
- Height: 178 cm (70 in)
- Spouse: Mika Katsumura (m. 2006; div. 2008)
- Children: 1

Yūsuke Makiyama (牧山 雄亮, Makiyama Yūsuke, born April 2, 1980), known professionally as Yūsuke Tomoi (友井 雄亮, Tomoi Yūsuke) is a former Japanese actor, best known for his role as Ryou Asihara/Kamen Rider Gills in Kamen Rider Agito.

== Biography ==
On June 6, 2006, he married Mika Katsumura. In August that same year, Katsumura gave birth to a girl. The couple separated in June 2008 and announced their divorce in August 2008. Katsumura gained custody of their daughter.

Yusuke retired from acting on January 11, 2019 after admitting to allegations of domestic violence, adultery and theft. He now works as a grilled meat chef.

== Filmography ==
=== Film ===
- Kamen Rider Agito: A New Transformation (2001) as Ryou Asihara / Kamen Rider Gills
- Kamen Rider Agito: Project G4 (2001) as Ryou Asihara / Kamen Rider Gills
- Kamen Rider Ryuki: Episode Final (2002) as Asakura's Victim
- Godzilla Against Mechagodzilla (2002) as Lieutenant Susumu Hayama
- Godzilla: Tokyo S.O.S. (2003) as Lieutenant Susumu Hayama
- Getsuyou Drama series (2003)
- Ai no gekijou (2004)
- Kiken na kankei (2005)

=== Television ===
- Kamen Rider Agito (2001-2002) as Ryou Asihara / Kamen Rider Gills
- Chiritotechin (2007-2008) as Tomoharu Wada (Kiyomi-A's brother)

=== Video games ===
- Kamen Rider Agito (2001) as Kamen Rider Gills
- Kamen Rider: Seigi no Keifu (2003) as Kamen Rider Gills
- Godzilla vs Mecha Godzilla (2003) as Lieutenant Susumu Hayama
