= Ayumi Tokitō =

Japanese actress (born 1974)

- 時任 亜弓
- Born: 2 October 1974 (age 51); Tokyo, Japan
- Occupation: Actress
- Years active: 1999-2019
- Height: 1.60 m (5 ft 3 in)

Ayumi Tokitō (時任 亜弓, Tokitō Ayumi; born 2 October 1974) is a former Japanese actress. She works mainly in pink films, and has appeared in more than thirty films from 1999 until her retirement in 2019.

== Selected filmography ==
=== Movies ===
Year	Title	Role	Notes
2001	I.K.U.		
2001	Sister-in-Law's Wet Thighs		
2002	Nezulla the Rat Monster		
2007	Undead Pool		
