= Kamen Rider Agito =

Japanese television series

- Also known as: Masked Rider AGITΩ
- Genre: Tokusatsu; Superhero fiction Science fiction Action drama Horror; Supernatural fiction
- Created by: Shotaro Ishinomori
- Based on: Kamen Rider Kuuga
- Written by: Toshiki Inoue
- Directed by: Ryuta Tasaki
- Starring: Toshiki Kashu; Jun Kaname; Yūsuke Tomoi; Rina Akiyama; Takeshi Masu; Tokimasa Tanabe; Takanori Kikuchi; Toko Fujita; Jun Yamasaki; Akiyoshi Shibata; Rei Haneo; Atsushi Ogawa
- Opening theme: "Kamen Rider AGITO" "Kamen Rider AGITO ~24.7 version~" by Shinichi Ishihara
- Composer: Toshihiko Sahashi
- Country of origin: Japan
- No. of episodes: 51

Production
- Producers: Saeko Matsuda (TV Asahi); Shinichiro Shirakura (Toei); Naomi Takebe (Toei); Hideaki Tsukada (Toei)
- Running time: 20–25 minutes
- Production companies: Toei Company; Ishimori Productions; Asahi National Broadcasting; Asatsu-DK

Original release
- Network: ANN (TV Asahi)
- Release: January 28, 2001 – January 27, 2002

Related
- Kamen Rider Kuuga; Kamen Rider Ryuki

Kamen Rider Agito (仮面ライダーアギト, Kamen Raidā Agito) is the 11th installment in the popular Kamen Rider tokusatsu franchise. The series represented the 30th anniversary of the Kamen Rider Series.

The series was also a joint collaboration between Asatsu-DK and Toei and was shown on TV Asahi from January 28, 2001, to January 27, 2002. The series served as an indirect sequel to Kamen Rider Kuuga, which this show is meant to be set in the same universe as the previous show, and the first Kamen Rider series to not have an ending sequence. The series aired along with Hyakujuu Sentai Gaoranger. The series is airing on Toku after being added to the network in November 2020.

== Story ==
Two years have passed since the Unidentified Lifeform case concluded, a series of mysterious and impossible murders are taking place across the city carried out by unknown beings. A man named Shoichi Tsugami has no memory of who he was, where he came from, or how he came upon his peculiar circumstances to transform into a powerful superhuman, Kamen Rider Agito, whenever in the presence of the beings referred to by the police as the "Unknown". Known as the Lords, these powerful monsters perceived themselves as humanity's defenders and kill certain people in a series of murders that force the police department to make Makoto Hikawa the user of the Kamen Rider G3 powersuit which was modeled after Kamen Rider Kuuga. Shoichi and Makoto, both initially hesitant of the other at first, are joined by Ryo Ashihara, who becomes a pre-Agito known as Kamen Rider Gills and seeks the truth behind his father's suicide. These mysteries and many others collide as the true nature of Agito would ultimately determine the fate of humanity.

== Episodes ==
No.	Title	Directed by	Written by	Original release date
1	"The Warrior's Awakening"; Transliteration: "Senshi no Kakusei" (Japanese: 戦士の覚醒)	Ryuta Tasaki	Toshiki Inoue	January 28, 2001
2	"Blue Storm"; Transliteration: "Ao no Arashi" (Japanese: 青の嵐)	Ryuta Tasaki	Toshiki Inoue	February 4, 2001
3	"My Transformation!"; Transliteration: "Ore no Henshin!" (Japanese: 俺の変身!)	Takao Nagaishi	Toshiki Inoue	February 11, 2001
4	"Puzzle Decoding"; Transliteration: "Pazuru Kaidoku" (Japanese: パズル解読)	Takao Nagaishi	Toshiki Inoue	February 18, 2001
5	"The Third Warrior"; Transliteration: "Dai San no Senshi" (Japanese: 第3の戦士)	Shunji Muguruma	Toshiki Inoue	February 25, 2001
6	"Sorrowful Monstrous Fist"; Transliteration: "Kanashiki Yōken" (Japanese: 哀しき妖拳)	Shunji Muguruma	Toshiki Inoue	March 4, 2001
7	"A Piece of a Memory"; Transliteration: "Kioku no Ippen" (Japanese: 記憶の一片)	Ryuta Tasaki	Toshiki Inoue	March 11, 2001
8	"Sword of Red Flames"; Transliteration: "Akai Honō no Tsurugi" (Japanese: 赤い炎の剣)	Ryuta Tasaki	Toshiki Inoue	March 18, 2001
9	"The Two G3s"; Transliteration: "Futari no Jī Surī" (Japanese: 2人のG3)	Takao Nagaishi	Toshiki Inoue	March 25, 2001
10	"Silver Points and Lines"; Transliteration: "Gin no Ten to Sen" (Japanese: 銀の点と線)	Takao Nagaishi	Toshiki Inoue	April 1, 2001
11	"The Past Tied Together"; Transliteration: "Tsunagaru Kako" (Japanese: 繋がる過去)	Hidenori Ishida	Toshiki Inoue	April 8, 2001
12	"The Crash in the Lake!"; Transliteration: "Mizuumi no Gekitotsu!" (Japanese: 湖の激突!)	Hidenori Ishida	Toshiki Inoue	April 15, 2001
13	"Dad's Clue"; Transliteration: "Chichi no Tegakari" (Japanese: 父の手掛かり)	Ryuta Tasaki	Toshiki Inoue	April 22, 2001
14	"The Strongest Kick"; Transliteration: "Saikyō Kikku" (Japanese: 最強キック)	Ryuta Tasaki	Toshiki Inoue	April 29, 2001
15	"A Trap Begins"; Transliteration: "Wana no Hajimari" (Japanese: 罠の始まり)	Takao Nagaishi	Toshiki Inoue	May 6, 2001
16	"A Suspicious Woman..."; Transliteration: "Ayashii On'na..." (Japanese: 怪しい女...)	Takao Nagaishi	Toshiki Inoue	May 13, 2001
17	"Capture Tactics!"; Transliteration: "Hokaku Sakusen!" (Japanese: 捕獲作戦!)	Takao Nagaishi	Toshiki Inoue	May 20, 2001
18	"The New Boss"; Transliteration: "Atarashii Bosu" (Japanese: 新しいボス)	Hidenori Ishida	Toshiki Inoue	May 27, 2001
19	"Breakup Decision?"; Transliteration: "Kaisan Kettei?" (Japanese: 解散決定?)	Hidenori Ishida	Toshiki Inoue	June 3, 2001
20	"That Awakening"; Transliteration: "Aru Mezame" (Japanese: 或る目覚め)	Nobuhiro Suzumura	Toshiki Inoue	June 10, 2001
21	"Rampaging Power"; Transliteration: "Bōsō Suru Chikara" (Japanese: 暴走する力)	Nobuhiro Suzumura	Toshiki Inoue	June 24, 2001
22	"Fateful Showdown"; Transliteration: "Unmei no Taiketsu" (Japanese: 運命の対決)	Ryuta Tasaki	Toshiki Inoue	July 1, 2001
23	"The Qualified Person"; Transliteration: "Shikaku Aru Mono" (Japanese: 資格ある者)	Ryuta Tasaki	Toshiki Inoue	July 8, 2001
24	"The Flawless Machine"; Transliteration: "Kanpeki Mashin" (Japanese: 完璧マシン)	Takao Nagaishi	Toshiki Inoue	July 15, 2001
25	"Another Clash!"; Transliteration: "Gekitotsu Futatabi!" (Japanese: 激突再び!)	Takao Nagaishi	Toshiki Inoue	July 22, 2001
26	"Restored Memories"; Transliteration: "Yomigaetta Kioku!" (Japanese: 甦った記憶)	Hidenori Ishida	Toshiki Inoue	July 29, 2001
27	"Ryo Dies..."; Transliteration: "Ryō, Shisu..." (Japanese: 涼、死す...)	Hidenori Ishida	Toshiki Inoue	August 5, 2001
28	"That Summer Day"; Transliteration: "Ano Natsu no Hi" (Japanese: あの夏の日)	Kenkō Satō	Yasuko Kobayashi	August 12, 2001
29	"A Numerical Mystery!?"; Transliteration: "Sūji no Nazo!?" (Japanese: 数字の謎!?)	Kenkō Satō	Toshiki Inoue	August 19, 2001
30	"Hidden Power"; Transliteration: "Kakusareta Chikara" (Japanese: 隠された力)	Takao Nagaishi	Toshiki Inoue	August 26, 2001
31	"A Person's Whereabouts"; Transliteration: "Hito no Ibasho" (Japanese: 人の居場所)	Takao Nagaishi	Toshiki Inoue	September 2, 2001
32	"Gills Resurrection"; Transliteration: "Girusu Fukkatsu" (Japanese: ギルス復活)	Takao Nagaishi	Toshiki Inoue	September 9, 2001
33	"The Enemy Who Appeared"; Transliteration: "Arawareta Teki" (Japanese: 現れた敵)	Osamu Kaneda	Toshiki Inoue	September 16, 2001
34	"Summoning Souls to Meet"; Transliteration: "Yobiau Tamashii" (Japanese: 呼び逢う魂)	Osamu Kaneda	Toshiki Inoue	September 23, 2001
35	"The Mysterious Messiah"; Transliteration: "Nazo no Kyūseishu" (Japanese: 謎の救世主)	Takao Nagaishi	Toshiki Inoue	September 30, 2001
36	"The Fourth Man"; Transliteration: "Yoninme no Otoko" (Japanese: 4人目の男)	Takao Nagaishi	Toshiki Inoue	October 7, 2001
37	"The Warrior of Darkness"; Transliteration: "Kurayami no Senshi" (Japanese: 暗闇の戦士)	Katsuya Watanabe	Toshiki Inoue	October 14, 2001
38	"The True Identity..."; Transliteration: "Sono Shōtai..." (Japanese: その正体...)	Katsuya Watanabe	Toshiki Inoue	October 21, 2001
39	"Gills Howl"; Transliteration: "Girusu Hōkō" (Japanese: ギルス咆哮)	Nobuhiro Suzumura	Toshiki Inoue	October 28, 2001
40	"United Front!"; Transliteration: "Kyōdō Sensen!" (Japanese: 共同戦線!)	Nobuhiro Suzumura	Toshiki Inoue	November 11, 2001
41	"Light and Darkness"; Transliteration: "Hikari to Yami" (Japanese: 光と闇)	Ryuta Tasaki	Toshiki Inoue	November 18, 2001
42	"The Akatsuki"; Transliteration: "Akatsuki-gō" (Japanese: あかつき号)	Ryuta Tasaki	Toshiki Inoue	November 25, 2001
43	"The Darkness That Begins to Move"; Transliteration: "Ugokidasu Yami" (Japanese: 動きだす闇)	Takao Nagaishi	Toshiki Inoue	December 2, 2001
44	"Dad and Older Sister and..." Transliteration: "Chichi to Ane to..." (Japanese: 父と姉と...)	Takao Nagaishi	Toshiki Inoue	December 9, 2001
45	"Stolen Power"; Transliteration: "Ubawareta Chikara" (Japanese: 奪われた力)	Osamu Kaneda	Toshiki Inoue	December 16, 2001
46	"Warriors, Those Bonds"; Transliteration: "Senshi Sono Kizuna" (Japanese: 戦士その絆)	Osamu Kaneda	Toshiki Inoue	December 23, 2001
47	"The Mystery of the Sky!"; Transliteration: "Tenkū no Kai!" (Japanese: 天空の怪!)	Hidenori Ishida	Toshiki Inoue	December 30, 2001
48	"The Governor of Stars"; Transliteration: "Hoshi no Shihaisha" (Japanese: 星の支配者)	Hidenori Ishida	Toshiki Inoue	January 6, 2002
49	"Footsteps of Destruction"; Transliteration: "Zetsumetsu no Ashioto" (Japanese: 絶滅の足音)	Takao Nagaishi	Toshiki Inoue	January 13, 2002
50	"Now, Time to Battle"; Transliteration: "Ima, Tatakau Toki" (Japanese: 今、戦う時)	Takao Nagaishi	Toshiki Inoue	January 20, 2002
51	"AGITΩ"	Takao Nagaishi	Toshiki Inoue	January 27, 2002

== Movies and specials ==
- Kamen Rider Agito the Movie: Project G4 (劇場版 仮面ライダーアギト PROJECT G4, Gekijōban Kamen Raidā Agito Purojekuto Jī Fō)

Released in Japanese theaters on September 22, 2001, Project G4 was a double bill with Hyakujuu Sentai Gaoranger the Movie: The Fire Mountain Roars. Shoichi encounters a teenage girl called Sayaka Kahara, who ran away from a military facility because of an attack by the Ant Lords. Sayaka has a supernatural ability to foresee the future. Risa Fukami, of the military group GA, wants to use that power to enhance the newly made G4 System, which was based on designs stolen from Ozawa. Now, Agito and Gills must fight to stop the Ant Lords' attack, as G3 and G4 settle their score. The events of the movie happen in the late 30s–early 40s after the special.

The film grossed over ¥1 billion at the Japanese box office.

Aratanaru Henshin Title Banner

- Kamen Rider Agito Special: A New Transformation (仮面ライダーアギトスペシャル 新たなる変身, Kamen Raidā Agito Supesharu Arata naru Henshin)

They were originally aired on October 1, 2001, between episodes 35 and 36; the special features all three Riders plus the first appearances of G3 Mild and Agito Shining Form. Shoichi encounters psychologist Azuma Kunieda, who had once nursed him back to health, fights an Unknown at night, and reaches Burning Form, but goes out of control. Then, Kunieda helps him control it. All three Riders fight against the Beetle Lord. The story ended with a mysterious girl stalking G4 and was to be continued in the movie.

There is a difference between the series' plot and the special's plot: in the latter, Tōru Hōjō eavesdrops on Shōichi and Kunieda's conversation behind a window and finds out Shōichi is Agito; in the series, however, Hōjō ambushes Agito as he flees from a battle scene, sees as he reverts to Shōichi, and arrests him.

- Kamen Rider Agito: Three Great Riders' Super Battle Video (仮面ライダーアギト 3大ライダー超決戦(バトル)ビデオ, Kamen Raidā Agito San Dai Raidā Chō Batoru Bideo)

Three Great Riders is the Hyper Battle Video for Agito released in 2001. The events of the video show Teleppi (てれっピ, Tereppi), the Televi-Kun mascot, calling upon Kamen Riders Agito, G3, and Gills to help fight several Unknowns that have invaded his world. Still, he will only trust the "Ultimate Rider". The video featured exclusive finishing moves for the three Riders. G3's special weapon that appears in the video, the Antares, was later featured in the television series.

- Agito: Psychic War (アギト—超能力戦争—, Agito Chōnōryoku Sensō)

Released in Japanese theaters on April 29, 2026, Psychic War is a special movie that commemorates the series' 25th anniversary as well as the 55th anniversary of the Kamen Rider franchise. The movie focuses on the superpower awakening outbreak across the city, with the cast returning to solve everything related to it once and for all. The character for this movie, Ruriko Aoi appeared as a cameo in episode 32 of Kamen Rider ZEZTZ.

== Production ==
The Kamen Rider Agito trademark was registered by Toei on October 16, 2000.

== Video games ==
- A video game based on the series, developed by KAZe and published by Bandai, was released in Japan on November 29, 2001, for the PlayStation. It is a fighting game.
- Kamen Rider: Seigi no Keifu (仮面ライダー 正義の系譜, Kamen Raidā Seigi no Keifu; "Kamen Rider: Genealogy of Justice")

Kamen Rider Agito appears as the main character of the 1988 storyline in this 3D action game for the PlayStation 2. Agito's timeline takes place in April, which take place during the final episode of Kamen Rider Agito between three months after the defeat of Lord race and nine months before the TV series airing end. Additionally, as Hikawa retired from his duty as Kamen Rider G3-X, and this game primarily focuses on Kamen Rider (1971), Kamen Rider V3 and Kamen Rider Black cast, only Shoichi and a non-playable character Ashihara/Kamen Rider Gills appear in this game. Despite the Lords' terror ends three months ago, Shoichi is drawn into old Shocker's hideout, where he forced to fight various kaijin and Shocker soldiers. During an infiltration, he comes in contact with Kamen Rider 1, Kamen Rider V3 and Kamen Rider Black in hopes to undoes Shocker's timeline intervention. Kamen Rider Gills eventually arrive in the climax of game. Upon learning that the game's true villain is after both Black and Shadow Moon's Kingstones, Agito, V3 and Rider 1 travel to 1988 to assist Black in the game's final battle at cost of the mastermind's unwilling vessel from V3's timeline, Doctor Tadokoro. Toshiki Kashu reprise his role as Shoichi in this game.

== S.I.C. Hero Saga ==
Agito featured two S.I.C. Hero Saga side stories published in Monthly Hobby Japan magazine. The first was titled Masked Rider ΑGITΩ: Heaven's Door (MASKED RIDER ΑGITΩ -HEAVEN'S DOOR-) and featured a crossover with Kamen Rider 555. It introduces the new characters Mirage Agito (ミラージュアギト, Mirāju Agito) and the Dog Orphnoch (ドッグオルフェノク, Doggu Orufenoku). The story was published from October 2003 to March 2004. Later, in the S.I.C. Hero Saga Vol. 2 book, the elements of 555 were removed from the story and the Dog Orphnoch was changed to the Dog Load (ドッグロード, Doggu Rōdo).

The second S.I.C. Hero Saga story titled Masked Rider ΑGITΩ: Project G1 (MASKED RIDER ΑGITΩ -PROJECT G1-) expands on the story told in Project G4 in showing the G-Series suits Generation 1, Kamen Rider G4-X (仮面ライダーG4-X, Kamen Raidā Jī Fō Ekkusu), Generation 2, and the Road Chaser (ロードチェイサー, Rōdo Cheisā) vehicle. It also features the Hydrozoa Lord (ハイドロゾアロード, Haidorozoa Rōdo) Hydrozoa Tegula (ヒドロゾア・テグラ, Hidorozoa Tegura). The story was published from October 2007 to January 2008.

Heaven's Door chapter titles

1. Outset (発端, Hottan)
2. ΑgitΩ (アギト, Agito)
3. Operation (操作, Sōsa)
4. Conceit (奇想, Kisō)
5. Psychic (能力者, Nōryokusha)
6. The Alpha and the Omega (ΑにしてΩ, Arufa ni shite Omega)

Project G1 chapter titles

1. GENERATION 1
2. G4-X
3. V1
4. ΑGITΩ

== Novel ==
Novel: Kamen Rider Agito (小説 仮面ライダーアギト, Shōsetsu Kamen Raidā Agito), written by Naohiro Okamura and supervised by Toshiki Inoue, is part of a series of spin-off novel adaptions of the Heisei Era Kamen Riders. The novel was released on January 31, 2013.

== Cast ==
- Shoichi Tsugami (津上 翔一, Tsugami Shōichi): Toshiki Kashu (賀集 利樹, Kashū Toshiki)
- Makoto Hikawa (氷川 誠, Hikawa Makoto): Jun Kaname (要 潤, Kaname Jun)
- Ryo Ashihara (葦原 涼, Ashihara Ryō): Yūsuke Tomoi (友井 雄亮, Tomoi Yūsuke) (Note: In Agito: Psychic War, he made a brief cameo in a scene filmed at the yakiniku restaurant where he currently works as the manager.)
- Mana Kazaya (風谷 真魚, Kazaya Mana): Rina Akiyama (秋山 莉奈, Akiyama Rina)
- Yoshihiko Misugi (美杉 義彦, Misugi Yoshihiko): Takeshi Masu (升 毅, Masu Takeshi)
- Taichi Misugi (美杉 太一, Misugi Taichi): Tokimasa Tanabe (田辺 季正, Tokimasa Tanabe)
- Kaoru Kino (木野 薫, Kino Kaoru): Takanori Kikuchi (菊池 隆則, Kikuchi Takanori)
- Sumiko Ozawa (小沢 澄子, Ozawa Sumiko), Corvus Canosus (コルウス・カノッスス, Korūsu Kanossusu; Voice; 35–36): Toko Fujita (藤田 瞳子, Fujita Tōko)
- Tōru Hōjō (北條 透, Hōjō Tōru): Jun Yamasaki (山崎 潤, Yamasaki Jun)
- Takahiro Omuro (尾室 隆弘, Omuro Takahiro): Akiyoshi Shibata (柴田 明良, Shibata Akiyoshi)
- Nobuyuki Kazaya (風谷 伸幸, Kazaya Nobuyuki): Tōru Nakane (中根 徹, Nakane Tōru)
- Yukina Sawaki (沢木 雪菜, Sawaki Yukina): Ayumi Kasama (笠間 あゆみ, Kasama Ayumi)
- Tetsuya Sawaki (沢木 哲也, Sawaki Tetsuya): Atsushi Ogawa (小川 敦史, Ogawa Atsushi)
- Mysterious youth (謎の青年, Nazo no Seinen): (Note: Credited as Youth.) Rei Haneo (羽緒 レイ, Haneo Rei)
- Kōji Kōno (河野 浩司, Kōno Kōji): Kazumasa Taguchi (田口 主将, Taguchi Kazumasa)
- Sakiko Mikumo (三雲 咲子, Mikumo Sakiko): Ryoko Takizawa (滝沢 涼子, Takizawa Ryōko)
- Senior police officers: Kentarō Kaji (加地 健太郎, Kaji Kentarō), Ken Kano (狩野 謙, Kanō Ken), Masahiro Noguchi (野口 雅弘, Noguchi Masahiro)
- Ramen cart owner: Taro Suwa (諏訪 太朗, Suwa Tarō)
- Automobile repair shop owner: Tetsuya Nakayashiki (中屋敷 哲也, Nakayashiki Tetsuya)
- Aki Sakaki (榊 亜紀, Sakaki Aki): Masako Sakuma (佐久間 雅子, Sakuma Masako)
- Kōji Majima (真島 浩二, Majima Kōji): Yoshikazu Kotani (小谷 嘉一, Kotani Yoshikazu)
- Katsuhiko Sagara (相良 克彦, Sagara Katsuhiko): Takahiko Tatsuke (田付 貴彦, Tatsuke Takahiko)
- Masumi Sekiya (関谷 真澄, Sekiya Masumi): Kami Hiraiwa (平岩 紙, Hiraiwa Kami)
- Kana Okamura (岡村 可奈, Okamura Kana): Eriko Moriwaki (森脇 英理子, Moriwaki Eriko)
- Risa Mizuhara (水原 リサ, Mizuhara Risa): Mina Mizuki (水稀 未那, Mizuki Mina)

=== Voice cast ===
- El of the Water (水のエル, Mizu no Eru): Kiyoyuki Yanada (梁田 清之, Yanada Kiyoyuki)
- El of the Wind (風のエル, Kaze no Eru): Kujira (くじら)
- El of the Ground (地のエル, Chi no Eru): Kenta Miyake (三宅 健太, Miyake Kenta)
- Narrator: Eiichiro Suzuki (鈴木 英一郎, Suzuki Eiichirō)

=== Guest cast ===
- Fish vendor (13): Ikko Tadano (ただの いっこ, Tadano Ikko)
- Ryūji Tsukasa (司 龍二, Tsukasa Ryūji; 18–19): Masaki Terasoma (寺杣 昌紀, Terasoma Masaki)
- Kōsuke Takamura (高村 光介, Takamura Kōsuke; 22–25): Kōji Shimizu (清水 綋治, Shimizu Kōji)
- Detective (40): Daisuke Tsuchiya (土屋 大輔, Tsuchiya Daisuke)
- Naozumi Shirakawa (白河 尚純, Shirakawa Naozumi; 49–50): Yutaka Hirose (広瀬 裕, Hirose Yutaka)

=== Spin-off cast ===
- Azuma Kunieda (国枝 東, Kunieda Azuma; A New Transformation): Masaki Kyomoto (京本 政樹, Kyōmoto Masaki)
- Hiroki Kunieda (国枝 広樹, Kunieda Hiroki; A New Transformation): Hiroto Horibe (堀部 寛十, Horibe Hiroto)
- Shiro Mizuki (水城 史朗, Mizuki Shirō; Project G4): Ryo Karato (唐渡 亮, Karato Ryō)
- Risa Fukami (深海 理沙, Fukami Risa; Project G4): Maju Ozawa (小沢 真珠, Ozawa Maju)
- Sayaka Kahara (加原 紗綾香, Kahara Sayaka; Project G4): Akane Kimura (木村 茜, Kimura Akane)
- Rei Motoki (本木 レイ, Motoki Rei; Project G4): Rikiya Otaka (大高 力也, Ōtaka Rikiya)
- Hamburger shop customer (Project G4): Shunsuke Nakamura (中村 俊介, Nakamura Shunsuke)
- Sayaka's father (Project G4): Tsuyoshi Ujiki (うじき つよし, Ujiki Tsuyoshi)
- Sayaka's mother (Project G4): Noriko Watanabe (渡辺 典子, Watanabe Noriko)
- MPD Superintendent General (Project G4): Hiroshi Fujioka (藤岡 弘、, Fujioka Hiroshi; Cameo)
- Ruriko Aoi (葵 るり子, Aoi Ruriko; Psychic War): Yuchami (ゆうちゃみ, Yūchami)
- Rouge (ルージュ, Rūju; Psychic War): Hiroaki Iwanaga (岩永 洋昭, Iwanaga Hiroaki)
- Haruma Kitou (鬼頭 春馬, Kitō Haruma; Psychic War): Suzunosuke (鈴之助)
- Shibukawa (渋川; Psychic War): Kokoro Aoshima (青島 心, Aoshima Kokoro)
- Hayami (速見; Psychic War): Satoshi Kanada (金田 哲, Kanada Satoshi)
- Kurotani (黒谷; Psychic War): Yuki Imai (今井 悠貴, Imai Yūki)
- Oyama (大山, Ōyama; Psychic War): Ryusuke Komakine (駒木根 隆介, Komakine Ryūsuke)
- Kasumi Murano (村野 かすみ, Murano Kasumi; Psychic War): Becky (ベッキー, Bekkī)
- Kijima (杵島; Psychic War): Sosuke Ogata (小方 蒼介, Ogata Sōsuke)
- Kagawa (香川; Psychic War): Minami Sakuma (佐久間 美波, Sakuma Minami)
- Hiraoka (平岡; Psychic War): Kenzo Ryu (笠 兼三, Ryū Kenzō)
- Tanaka (田中; Psychic War): Teruo Yoshida (吉田 輝生, Yoshida Teruo)
- Soba shop owner (Psychic War): Cookie (くっきー, Kukkī)
- Chief of police (Psychic War): Seiji Takaiwa (高岩 成二, Takaiwa Seiji)
- Prison officer (Psychic War): Noboru Kaneko (金子 昇, Kaneko Noboru)
- G Buckle Mark 7 (Gバックル mark7, Jī Bakkuru Māku Sebun; Voice; Psychic War): Asami Seto (瀬戸 麻沙美, Seto Asami)

== Songs ==
Opening themes

- "Kamen Rider AGITO" (仮面ライダーAGITO, Kamen Raidā AGITO)
  - Lyrics: Shoko Fujibayashi (藤林 聖子, Fujibayashi Shōko)
  - Composition & Arrangement: Kazunori Miyake (三宅 一徳, Miyake Kazunori)
  - Chorus: Lisa Ooki (大木 理紗, Ōki Risa)
  - Artist: Shinichi Ishihara (石原 慎一, Ishihara Shin'ichi)
  - Episodes: 2–35
  Episode 1 does not feature the show's opening sequence, and it is used as an ending song in episode 51.
- "Kamen Rider AGITO ~24.7 version~" (仮面ライダーAGITO ～24.7 version～, Kamen Raidā AGITO ~24.7 bājon~)
  - Lyrics: Shoko Fujibayashi
  - Composition & Arrangement: Kazunori Miyake
  - Remix: Kazunori Miyake, Hiroyuki Suzuki (鈴木 浩之, Suzuki Hiroyuki), Takashi Sasaki (篠笥 孝, Sasaki Takashi)
  - Chorus: Lisa Ooki
  - Artist: Shinichi Ishihara
  - Episodes: 36–50
  Also used in Kamen Rider Agito Special: A New Transformation and as an insert song in Kamen Rider Agito the Movie: Project G4.

Insert themes

- "BELIEVE YOURSELF"
  - Lyrics: Shoko Fujibayashi
  - Composition & Arrangement: Kazunori Miyake
  - Artist: Naoto Fuuga (風雅 なおと, Fūga Naoto)
  - Episodes: 1–8, 10–13, 15–29, 51
  Also used in Kamen Rider Agito Special: A New Transformation.
- "stranger in the dark"
  - Lyrics: Shoko Fujibayashi
  - Composition & Arrangement: Toshihiko Sahashi (佐橋 俊彦, Sahashi Toshihiko)
  - Artist: Norio Sakai (坂井 紀雄, Sakai Norio)
  - Episodes: 9
- "MACHINE TORNADER"
  - Lyrics: Shoko Fujibayashi
  - Composition & Arrangement: Kazunori Miyake
  - Artist: Shinichi Ishihara
  - Episodes: 14, 31, 40
- "DEEP BREATH"
  - Lyrics: Shoko Fujibayashi
  - Composition: Yoshio Nomura (野村 義男, Nomura Yoshio)
  - Arrangement: RIDER CHIPS
  - Artist: RIDER CHIPS Featuring ROLLY
  - Episodes: 26–39, 41, 43–48
- "Mō Hitotsu no Kamen no Gikyoku" (もうひとつの仮面の戯曲; "Play of Another Mask")
  - Lyrics (Japanese ver.): Shoko Fujibayashi
  - Composition & Arrangement: Toshihiko Sahashi
  - Artist: Tamami Shiraishi (白石 圭美, Shiraishi Tamami)
  - Episodes: 40, 42, 45–46, 51
  Also used in Kamen Rider Agito the Movie: Project G4.

Movie themes

- "Jiken da!" (事件だッ!; "It's Trouble!")
  - Lyrics & Composition: Tortoise Matsumoto (トータス 松本, Tōtasu Matsumoto)
  - Arrangement & Artist: Ulfuls (ウルフルズ, Urufuruzu)
  The theme song for Kamen Rider Agito the Movie: Project G4.
- "Dramatic Heibon" (ドラマティック平凡, Doramatikku Heibon; "Dramatic Ordinary")
  - Lyrics, Composition, Arrangement, & Artist: Orange Range
  The theme song for Agito: Psychic War.

== Broadcasts, Home Video, and Video Streaming ==
- In its home country of Japan, the series originally aired on Sunday Mornings at 8:00AM EST on TV Asahi and other ANN affiliates from January 28, 2001 to January 27, 2002, concluding at 51 episodes. Starting on December 7, 2001 until November 21, 2002, during the near end of the original run, Toei Video started releasing all 51 episodes of the series on retailer VHS and DVD. Although, rentals first began prior on October 21, 2001. There are 12 volumes in total, and the content is the same as the DVD version (both for sale and rental). Each volume for both releases each hold four episodes, with the last three volume holding five episodes. The previous series Kamen Rider Kuuga was still being released on both VHS and DVD at the time of this series' being released. The first episode was included as a limited edition video bonus in the "Shotaro Ishinomori 70th Anniversary DVD Box" released on July 21, 2008, and in the first production run of "Kamen Rider Decade Vol. 5" released on November 21, 2009. The series was later released on Blu-Ray in three volume boxsets starting on September 14, 2016 up until January 11, 2017. The first boxset contains the TV special, Kamen Rider Agito: Three Great Riders.
- In Southeast Asia, an English dub was produced in Hong Kong by Omni Productions and was aired on Television and released on home video during 2002, under the title: Masked Rider Agito.
- In the Philippines, it was aired on ABS-CBN from 2003 to 2004 with a Tagalog dub, under the title of Masked Rider Agito.
- In Indonesia, the series on Indosiar with an Indonesian dub from January 30, 2005 to January 29, 2006. All 51 episodes were covered.
- In the United States, the series aired in its original Japanese audio with English subtitles on the Toku TV channel and streaming service in November 2020. A new English dub would be made for FreeTV in 2024 by Olympusat, but it was actually based on the Latin Spanish dub prior from 2021.
- Two decades later, Toei commissioned a Latin-Spanish dub in 2021, produced by Olympusat with dubbing work by Mexican studio, Meliorem for digital streaming. This was dubbed remotely online during the COVID-19 pandemic. It was licensed and released in Latin America on April 24, 2021, on and May 23, 2023, in North America on FreeTV respectively, and DistroTV for Latin American users in March 2023.
