= I.K.U. =

2000 film by Shu Lea Cheang

- "This is not LOVE. This is SEX."
- Directed by: Shu Lea Cheang
- Written by: Shu Lea Cheang
- Produced by: Takashi Asai
- Starring: Ayumi Tokito; Zachery Nataf; Aja; Akira the Hustler
- Cinematography: Tetsuya Kamoto
- Edited by: Kazuhiro Shirao
- Music by: Hoppy Kamiyama; The Saboten
- Distributed by: Uplink Co.
- Release date: May 3, 2001 (Japan)
- Running time: 90 minutes (Premiere); 74 minutes
- Country: Japan
- Languages: Japanese; English

I.K.U. (pronounced ai-kei-ju, abbreviated as iku^{?}) is a 2001 independent film directed by Taiwanese-American experimental filmmaker Shu Lea Cheang. It was marketed as "a Japanese Sci-Fi Porn Feature". The film was partially inspired by Blade Runner (1982). I.K.U.'s premise involves a futuristic corporation sending shapeshifting cyborgs out into New Tokyo to collect "orgasm data" by means of sexual intercourse. The title is a pun on the Japanese word iku (行く) which, in sexual slang, is used to express an orgasm.

I.K.U. premiered at the 2000 Sundance Film Festival. It was the first pornographic film ever screened in the festival. Critical reception was poor.

== Plot ==
The film is set in or about the year 2030. The multinational Genom Corporation is developing a product called the "I.K.U. Chip", which is plugged into a portable device allowing consumers to download and experience orgasms from the I.K.U. server without need of physical contact. The corporation sends their cybernetic shapeshifter Reiko, known as an I.K.U. Coder or replicant, to collect orgasm-related information catering to various sexual orientations. To collect the data Reiko transforms into an appearance pleasing to an individual or couple, engages the target(s) in sexual relations and transforms her right hand and forearm into a penis which is inserted into the recipient's vagina or anus during climax.

Reiko is directed on her missions by Genom employee Dizzy, known as an I.K.U. Runner. She has sex with various people such as a salaryman and a stripper, a young couple, a drug dealer and a hustler named Akira and a former museum curator–cum-hobo. She meets and is helped along the way by a retired I.K.U. Coder named Mash. Reiko is lured to a night club and seduced by Tokyo Rose, an agent of the rival Bio Link Corporation, who shuts her down with a computer virus and steals her data. Mash recovers Reiko and teaches her how to reboot herself through masturbation. Reiko manages to obtain enough data to complete her mission by having sex with Akira the Hustler, a sushi shop patron and Mash. Dizzy then extracts the data with a retrieval device called a Dildo Gun. Afterward, Reiko is retired and shut down. The Genom Corporation begins selling I.K.U. Chips in vending machines everywhere. Reiko reboots herself.

The DVD edition of the film has two endings which may be selected via an onscreen menu. In the first ending, Mash takes Reiko to meet Dizzy. The two profess their love and drive away. In the second, Mash takes Akira to meet Dizzy and they proceed similarly.

== Production ==
Producer Takashi Asai, founder of the underground and independent film production company Uplink, commissioned director and media artist Shu Lea Cheang to "make a sci-fi porn film". Cheang began writing the script with the intention of addressing Japanese censorship. Conflicts between the two began during the initial script writing process and lasted throughout production. Takashi wanted a traditional Japanese pink film, which integrated storyline and softcore sex, where Cheang aimed towards genre-defining American pornographic films along the lines of Behind the Green Door (1972), with hardcore sex throughout. Daily debates ranged from issues such as foreplay and sexual positions to fist fucking and penis size.

Pornographic actress Mai Hoshino was hired for the lead role, Reiko, but disappeared three days before shooting began. Of the subsequent actresses auditioned, Cheang was unable to find one who was both able to act and willing to perform all of the sexual acts outlined in the script. Instead, seven actresses were selected and the lead role modified to incorporate the shapeshifting element, allowing the contentious hardcore scenes to be meted out between the seven. Even so, the hardcore acts were continually renegotiated throughout filming.

The film was shot mainly in studio with some location shooting throughout Tokyo over a three-week period. Location shooting included scenes on the metropolitan highways where Andrei Tarkovsky shot the famous driving scene in Solaris (1972). During shooting Cheang came into further conflict with crew members and the police. Cinematographer Tetsuya Kamoto, well known for his music video photography, refused to include himself in the onscreen action, hamedori style. Editor Kazuhiro Shirao, also a film director, stated that "if it becomes a real porno film, I stop working on it". A Tokyo vice squad raided the set.

Post-production took more than six months although the visual effects company, VJ E-MALE, spent eight months on the film. I.K.U. was completed in July 2000.

== Cast ==
- Ayumi Tokito as Reiko number one
- Maria Yumeno as Reiko number two
- Yumeka Sasaki as Reiko number three
- Miho Ariga as Reiko number four
- Myu Asou as Reiko number five
- Etuyo Tsuchida as Reiko number six
- Tsousie as Reiko number seven
- Zachery Nataf as Dizzy
- Mash as Mash
- Aja as Tokyo Rose
- Akira the Hustler as Akira

== Reception ==
According to director Shu Lea Cheang, approximately 40 percent of the audience walked out over the course of the film, predominately during the sex scenes. The exodus was not repeated at subsequent screenings when Cheang "spelled [the film] out and challenged the audience to stay."

Critics generally disliked the film.

Phil Freeman wrote: "It's clear that the filmmakers felt the addition of a high-tech sheen would somehow vault their little movie (it's only 74 minutes long) above the morass of mainstream porn. They were wrong, though. Porn is porn, and in this case the extra effort expended only serves to make the final product vaguely embarrassing. It's as if the producers were ashamed of what they were up to, and thought they could disguise it by blanketing the thing with the trappings of science fiction."

== Release ==
I.K.U. premiered at the Sundance Film Festival in the Midnight program on January 29, 2000. It was the festival's first-ever pornographic film selected for competition.

The movie was released as a DVD in Japan in June 2006 by Up Link (アップリンク) and in the United States by Music Video Distributors with the title I.K.U. (This Is Not Love This Is Sex).
