= For Real (film) =

- Directed by: Sona Jain
- Written by: Sona Jain
- Produced by: Sona Jain
- Starring: Sarita Choudhury; Adil Hussain; Sameer Dharmadhikari
- Cinematography: Ruben O'Malley
- Release date: 28 November 2009

For Real is a 2009 film which follows the point of view of six-year-old Shruti (Zoya Hassan). Family discord has a deep impact on her and she starts feeling that her mother (Sarita Choudhury) is an alien from the Orion galaxy who has exchanged places with her own mother.

== Plot ==
Six-year-old Shruti believes her mother, Priya, has been replaced by an alien from the Orion galaxy. She turns to her brother for help, but he doesn't believe her. Her father as always is so wrapped up in his work that he remains unavailable to her. Unable to bear the absence of her real mother, Shruti decides to set out and get her real mother back.

The movie deals with the impact of seemingly trivial family tiffs on the tender psychology of a child. It portrays the world from the standpoint of a little child and seeks to show how children perceive various things in life.

== Cast ==
- Sarita Choudhury as Priya Singh
- Adil Hussain as Ravi Shukla
- Zoya Hassan as Shruti Shukla
- Sriharsh Sharma as Paras Shukla
- Sameer Dharmadhikari as Deepak Choudhury

== Production and reception ==
For Real was directed, produced and screenwritten by Sona Jain.

The film was well received, drawing praise as the only English-language film in the Indian Panorama section of the 40th International Film Festival of India. It took almost five years for the film to find sponsors and it was finally released in 2009.

It received four awards at the Asian Festival of First Films in Singapore.
