= Queer Boys and Girls on the Shinkansen =

- Directed by: Hasegawa Kenjiro iri Kang Yen-Nien; Woolala Satoko; Hata Tomoaki; Takasaki Keiichi; Hirai Yuko; Imaizumi Koichi; Taguchi Hiroki; Akira the Hustler
- Produced by: habakari-cinema+records
- Release date: July 17, 2004
- Running time: 58 minutes
- Languages: Japanese; English subtitles

Queer Boys and Girls on the Shinkansen is a 2004 Japanese movie produced by habakari-cinema+records. The English title is Queer Boys and Girls on the Bullet Train.

== Description ==
Queer Boys and Girls on the Shinkansen brings together ten filmmakers and artists who consistently affirm what it means to be gay or lesbian in their work. Habakari chose ten filmmakers to make a five-minute work each, developed around a gay or lesbian theme, and compiled the resulting shorts in random order to create this omnibus film. The result is a queer film, by queer filmmakers, for a queer audience. Each short is its own short story, and the styles range from drama and experimental film and animation.

== Acts ==
The movie consists of twelve acts.

- 00 - Opening Act, "Let's Take a Trip".
- 01 - "Parallel Contact", written and directed by Hasegawa Kenjiro.
- 02 - "I Hum, and She's Dashing When She Walks", written and directed by iri.
- 03 - "Key", directed by Kang Yen-Nien.
- 04 - "Wrap! Rap! -10cs^{3}-", written and directed by Woolala Satoko (うらら さとこ).
- 05 - "Juicy!", written and directed by JohnJ Heart.
- 06 - "Techniques for Deadly Blows in 199X", written, directed, and animated by Takasaki Keiichi.
- 07 - "Machi27", directed by Hirai Yuko.
- 08 - "I Want You to Kiss Me", written and directed by Imaizumi Koichi.
- 09 - "One Brilliant Moment", directed by Taguchi Hiroki.
- 10 - "Bye-Bye 'Over the Rainbow'", written and directed by Akira the Hustler.
- 11 - "Closing Act"
