= After Louie =

- Directed by: Vincent Gagliostro
- Written by: Vincent Gagliostro; Anthony Johnston
- Produced by: Lauren Belfer; Bryce J. Renninger; Alan Cumming
- Starring: Alan Cumming; Zachary Booth
- Cinematography: Aaron Kovalchik
- Edited by: Maria Cataldo
- Music by: Jonathan Sheffer
- Distributed by: Freestyle Digital Media
- Release dates: March 2017 (BFI Flare); March 30, 2018
- Running time: 100 minutes
- Country: United States
- Language: English

After Louie is a 2017 American romantic drama film written by Vincent Gagliostro and Anthony Johnston, directed by Gagliostro and starring Alan Cumming and Zachary Booth. The film premiered at the 2017 BFI Flare: London LGBTIQ+ Film Festival.

== Cast ==
- Alan Cumming as Sam Cooper
- Zachary Booth as Braeden Devries
- Sarita Choudhury as Maggie
- Patrick Breen as Jeffrey
- Wilson Cruz as Mateo
- David Drake as William Wilson
- Anthony Johnston as Lukas
- Justin Vivian Bond as Rhona
- Everett Quinton as Julian
- Lucas Caleb Rooney as Mark
- John Thomas Waite as Patrick
- Joey Arias as Jai

== Release ==
In March 2018, it was announced that Freestyle Digital Media acquired the rights to the film, which was released on March 30, 2018.

== Reception ==
The film has a 75% rating on Rotten Tomatoes based on twelve reviews.

Ken Jaworowski of The New York Times gave the film a positive review and wrote, "Some stronger filmmaking would be welcome, sure, but After Louie has an honesty that’s often just as valuable."

David Rooney of The Hollywood Reporter gave the film a negative review and wrote, "But while it’s well-intentioned to a fault, and driven by deep convictions, the film also is diffuse, lethargically paced and short on thematic trenchancy, building powerful individual moments but seldom sustaining a compelling narrative thread."

Norman Gidney of Film Threat awarded the film two stars and wrote, "Even though the film has a plodding pace there are flashes of honesty and brilliance that make this film worth a passive look."
