= Mirai Sentai Timeranger =

Japanese tokusatsu television series

- The title card for Mirai Sentai Timeranger
- Genre: Tokusatsu; Superhero fiction Science fiction Action thriller Crime; Drama
- Created by: Toei
- Developed by: Yasuko Kobayashi
- Directed by: Satoshi Morota
- Starring: Masaru Nagai; Mika Katsumura; Yūji Kido; Shūhei Izumi; Masahiro Kuranuki; Shinji Kasahara; Tamao Yoshimura; Asami Kuru
- Narrated by: Yukitoshi Hori
- Opening theme: "JIKŪ ~Mirai Sentai Timeranger~" ("Beyond All Space and Time") by Kumi Sasaki
- Ending theme: "Toki no Kanata E" by NAT'S (1–43, 46–49) "Miracle X-Mas" by T.R. Futures (44) "Eternal Wind" by Shigetaka Takayama (45) "Mirai no Yuku E" by Motoyoshi Iwasaki (50) "Don't Stop Your Story!" by T.R. Futures (Special)
- Composer: Kōichirō Kameyama
- Country of origin: Japan
- Original language: Japanese
- No. of episodes: 51 (list of episodes)

Production
- Producers: Ken Fukuyoshi (TV Asahi); Jun Hikasa (Toei); Kōichi Yada (Toei Agency)
- Production location: Tokyo, Japan (Greater Tokyo Area)
- Running time: approx. 25 minutes
- Production companies: TV Asahi; Toei Company; Toei Agency

Original release
- Network: ANN (TV Asahi)
- Release: February 13, 2000 – February 11, 2001

Related
- Kyuukyuu Sentai GoGoFive; Hyakujuu Sentai Gaoranger

Mirai Sentai Timeranger (未来戦隊タイムレンジャー, Mirai Sentai Taimurenjā; Future Squadron Timeranger) is a Japanese tokusatsu television series and the 24th series in Toei's Super Sentai metaseries. Footage from this series was used in the American production Power Rangers Time Force. It aired from February 13, 2000, to February 11, 2001, replacing Kyuukyuu Sentai GoGoFive, and was replaced by Hyakujuu Sentai Gaoranger. Timeranger was released on DVD by Shout! Factory in North America on July 31, 2018. This is the 9th Super Sentai Series to be released on Region 1 DVD in North America. The series debuted on February 13, 2000, when it replaced Kyuukyuu Sentai GoGoFive in TV Asahi's 7:30 JST time-slot, joining the recently debuted Kamen Rider Kuuga in what would three years later become the Super Hero Time programming block.

== Plot ==
In the 30th century, time travel becomes illegal after a time paradox crisis. The Time Protection Bureau (TPB) is established to watch for and stop time crimes. Four new enlistee cadets of the TPB are tricked by mafia leader Don Dolnero and his gang into letting them time-travel to the year 2000 to commit various crimes and, to protect history, the four cadets pursue them. They encounter a severe problem: the Timeranger program requires five members for the first operation. They coerce a present-day martial artist, Tatsuya Asami, to join them, and they become the Timerangers. Tatsuya rents a building for them to live in, and they start a small odd-jobs business called Tomorrow Research to financially support themselves.

Over time, the four cadets begin to realize that their presence would inevitably change the future in the form of the City Guardians, a security force under the employment of the Asami Corporation to protect the city from the Londerz. The City Guardians form a tenuous relationship with the Timerangers, especially when Tatsuya's college acquaintance Naoto becomes Time Fire and later also becomes the City Guardian's captain.

== Characters ==
=== Timerangers ===
The Timerangers (sans Naoto Takizawa) transformed. From left to right: Domon, Sion, Yuri, Tatsuya Asami, and Ayase.

The primary members of the eponymous Timerangers each carry a Chrono Changer (クロノチェンジャー, Kurono Chenjā) bracelet, which grants the use of the Accel Stop (アクセルストップ, Akuseru Sutoppu) ability, as their transformation device along with a pair of Double Vector (ダブルベクター, Daburu Bekutā) swords consisting of the minute hand-like Spark Vector (スパークベクター, Supāku Bekutā) and the hour hand-like Arrow Vector (アローベクター, Arō Bekutā), which can combine to form the double-bladed Time Vector (タイムベクター, Taimu Bekutā) naginata, as their sidearms. While transformed, they wield firearm-like Vol Weapons (ボルウェポン, Boru Wepon), which can combine to form the Voltech Bazooka (ボルテックバズーカ, Borutekku Bazūka). They also ride the Time Flyer (タイムフライヤー, Taimu Furaiyā) hoverjet for transportation. Later in the series, they acquire a set of Assault Mobile (アサルトモバイル, Asaruto Mobairu) attachments, which can combine with a Spark Vector to form the Assault Vector (アサルトベクター, Asaruto Bekutā) rifle.

==== Tatsuya Asami ====
Tatsuya Asami/Time Red (浅見 竜也/タイムレッド, Asami Tatsuya/Taimu Reddo): The main protagonist of the series, Tatsuya is a 22-year-old martial artist who is "drafted" into the team. He refuses to accept fate and his heritage as future CEO of his father's company. He believes that people can control their own destiny, but only if they fight for a desirable future. After joining the Timerangers, Tatsuya decides to move out of his father's house and uses his savings to rent the building that would be the Timeranger's home. He works as a karate teacher at Tomorrow Research (トゥモローリサーチ, Tumorō Risāchi). Although Yuri is the team leader, Tatsuya is the driving force of the Timerangers, essentially acting as field commander during the battles. In the finale, one year after the final battle, Tatsuya continues to live freely by choosing his lifestyle until he feels that he is ready to join his father's company. At the end of the series, he runs into four individuals who resemble Yuri, Ayase, Domon and Sion, who may be their ancestors, as well as an individual who resembles Naoto.

As Time Red, Tatsuya wields the Vol Blaster (ボルブラスター, Boru Burasutā). When operating the Time Robo (タイムロボ, Taimu Robo) formations, he is usually in charge of performing its finishers to recapture giant-sized Londerz prisoners by wielding a miniature version of the Space-Time Sword (時空剣, Jikūken) and/or the Pro Divider (プロディバイダー, Puro Dibaidā) sword/rifle hybrid to mimic the movement pattern. After Naoto's death, Tatsuya inherits his powers.

==== Yuri ====
Yuri/Time Pink (ユウリ/タイムピンク, Yūri/Taimu Pinku): The female protagonist of the series and the leader of the Timerangers, Yuri is a 21-year-old police officer from the 30th century. Since the Inter-City Police are aware of Don Dolnero's plan, she goes undercover as a TDB cadet to stop him. She holds a personal grudge against Don Dolnero for sending an assassin to kill her family in 2988. Yuri is initially cold towards Tatsuya, but eventually warms up to him. She works as a detective at Tomorrow Research but is open to other jobs such as cleaning services. In the series finale, she confesses to Tatsuya that she loves him, but they cannot be together due to the large gap between their timelines. Therefore, she returns to her own time and finds that, due to the time change in the 30th century, Dolnero's hit on her family 10 years earlier had failed.

As Time Pink, Yuri wields the Vol Spiner (ボルスナイパー, Boru Sunaipā).

==== Ayase ====
Ayase/Time Blue (アヤセ/タイムブルー, Ayase/Taimu Burū): A 22-year-old former racer who is the calm-headed second-in-command with a knack for high-speed battles and a deadpan sense of humor. However, said humor often puts Ayase at odds with Domon, which forces the other Timerangers to prevent a possible fistfight between the two. He is close friends with Tatsuya. As the only Timeranger with a driver's license, he works as a chauffeur at Tomorrow Research. It is soon revealed that Ayase has an incurable terminal illness called Osiris Syndrome (オシリス症候群, Oshirisu Shōkōgu). When Tatsuya finds out about the disease, he is determined to help his friend. The other Timerangers are shocked when Tatsuya is forced to reveal Ayase's illness to them. After time is altered at the end of the series, a cure for Osiris Syndrome was found a year earlier and Ayase can be cured.

As Time Blue, Ayase wields the Vol Launcher (ボルランチャー, Boru Ranchā).

==== Domon ====
Domon/Time Yellow (ドモン/タイムイエロー, Domon/Taimu Ierō): A 22-year-old womanizer, formerly a professional grappler, who tends to overdo it sometimes. Domon was banned from professional fighting for never being on time for a match because he would chase after girls. Despite this, he has great respect for the rules and, after learning that Sion is an orphan, sticks up for his youngest teammate and refuses to let anyone call him an alien. However, Domon, who comes from a large family, is the only one who truly misses the 30th century and harbors some resentment towards Ryuya for trapping them in the 20th century. This results in him taking his frustrations out on Tatsuya when the four cadets first meet him due to his resemblance to Ryuya. Although he works as the self-defense teacher at Tomorrow Research, Domon has no students. He argues with Ayase frequently due to the latter's humor towards his attitude on women. However, he does care about him deep down. An emotional Domon wanted Ayase to quit after learning about the latter's illness, though he reluctantly accepts Ayase's choice of not wanting to quit the team. Later on, he falls in love with camerawoman Honami Moriyama. After his secret identity is revealed to her, the two start dating and Domon eventually tells her that he comes from the 30th century. After the future is changed in the finale, Domon learns that his ban is reduced to a one-year suspension from the ring, which was up by the time he returns to the year 3001.

Domon reappears in Kaizoku Sentai Gokaiger where he learns that his love affair with Honami conceived her a son she would name Mirai (未来), nicknamed "Domon Jr." (ドモンジュニア, Domon Junia) by Tatsuya.

As Time Yellow, Domon wields the Vol Vulcan (ボルバルカン, Boru Barukan).

==== Sion ====
Sion/Time Green (シオン/タイムグリーン, Shion/Taimu Gurīn): A 17-year-old alien from the planet Hubbard (ハバード, Habādo), which was destroyed as the result of war, who was raised on Earth in a laboratory. Sion is agile and curious about everything around him. He is also fond of dyeing his hair, which he has done every so often since age 3. In episodes 1–10, as well as during the opening and ending sequences of the series, his hair was dyed blue/light blue/cyan (aqua)/sky blue, and in episodes 11–51 his hair was dyed brown/light brown/tan color to look like one of the normal people of the 20th century. Due to his alien physiology, Sion only needs to sleep once per year, but he must then spend a week in hibernation. He is the Timerangers' technical expert, capable of operating any machine, and in charge of Tomorrow Research's computer repairs. In the finale, Sion learns that his history has not changed because he is not from Earth. However, as he leaves, he says he is happy that he met Tatsuya and, thanks to him, he will never feel alone anymore.

As Time Green, Sion wields the Vol Pulser (ボルパルサー, Boru Parusā).

=== City Guardians ===
Wataru Asami forms a security force under his Asami Corporation to protect the city from the Londerz. The City Guardians (シティガーディアンズ, Shiti Gādianzu) gain a tenuous relationship with the Timerangers, especially when Tatsuya's college acquaintance Naoto becomes Time Fire and later the City Guardian's captain. The captain is required to wear a red beret. According to Ryuya, the City Guardians would later become the Inter-City Police (インターシティー警察, Intā Shitī Keisatsu).

==== Naoto Takizawa ====
Naoto Takizawa/Time Fire (滝沢 直人/タイムファイヤー, Takizawa Naoto/Taimu Faiyā): Tatsuya's 28-year-old rival and leader of the City Guardians established by the Asami Group. Unlike Tatsuya, Naoto came from the other side of the tracks, getting by on a scholarship as the two of them attended college. Naoto envied Tatsuya and wanted to be the better of the two. After Naoto becomes the red-colored Time Fire, the Asami Group attempts to analyze the technology for mass production, but cannot fully understand the 30th century technology. He finds out through Sion that the Londerz are just prisoners and only need to be recaptured. Eventually, he learns that the Timerangers came from the 30th century and uses this knowledge to gain full control of the City Guardians. Naoto also owns two pet birds, Tora and Sakura, which he later gives to a little girl. After Naoto is injured during the battle against Neo-Crisis, he finds out that Wataru has forced Ibuki to resign and the City Guardians were able to remove the voice lock function on the V-Commander (Ｖコマンダー, Bui Komandā) bracelet, which means they no longer need him. However, Naoto flees with the V-Commander. The girl who Naoto gave his birds to is seen trying to rescue the birds. A Zenit would have killed her, but Naoto protects her and is shot in her stead. At an emergency shelter he is treated for his injuries. When the little girl comes to thank him, they see one of the birds outside. Unaware of how badly he is already injured, Naoto goes out to catch the bird. He succeeds, but is shot down by a Zenit, which mortally wounds him and causes him to lose his balance and fall over a high stairwell railing. Naoto relinquishes the V-Commander to Tatsuya, telling him to change the way he lives as he dies.

During the events of Kaizoku Sentai Gokaiger, Naoto appears in a vision to Gai Ikari and grants him the Great Power of the Timerangers, which is the GouZyu Drill mode of GouZyuJin.

As Time Fire, Naoto utilizes the V-Commander to transform. He also wields the DV Defender (ＤＶディフェンダー, Dī Bui Difendā) sidearm, which can switch between its Defender Gun (ディフェンダーガン, Difendā Gan) and Defender Sword (ディフェンダーソード, Difendā Sōdo) modes. When facing giant-sized Londerz prisoners, he summons and remote controls the Tyrannosaurus-themed V-Rex (ブイレックス, Bui Rekkusu) mecha, which can assume a humanoid form known as V-Rex Robo (ブイレックスロボ, Bui Rekkusu Robo).

=== Allies ===
==== Captain Ryuya ====
Captain Ryuya (リュウヤ隊長, Ryūya Taichō): TDB commanding officer in 3000, the first Time Red, the original Time Fire, and a descendant of Tatsuya. Later in the series, he travels to 2000 to take over the role of Time Red once more, but returns the Chrono Changer to Tatsuya soon after. Uninterested in the past, Ryuya insists that the others Timerangers return to the future, as the Lambda 2000 intends to cause the Earth in the past to cease to exist. However, once they return, he attempts to erase their memories of their time in 2000–2001, telling the Timerangers how their actions in the past have changed their futures for the better. However, the other Timerangers flee just as Ayase confronts and mortally wounds Ryuya. Ryuya reveals that, not only is he the one who lets Don Dolnero escape into the past, but everything leading to the Timerangers being formed and Gien's insanity reaching its peak are also planned to ensure that the "better" of the two futures he saw would come to pass. He also reveals that the Timerangers were supposed to die in their first giant battle, and the aid he sends save their lives many times over. The original pilot of the V-Rex, Ryuya discovers two futures six years earlier when the G-Zord (Gゾード, Ji Zōdo) gets lost in space-time, along with him: one with Gien's battle with the V-Rex destroying a third of the 21st century, and another in which Gien's death by the G-Zord leads to the complete destruction of the 31st century. In both futures, however, Ryuya, as Time Fire, dies. To prevent his death, Ryuya sets up the V-Rex's disappearance to ensure that someone from the past will become Time Fire and die in his place. However, his actions merely change the manner in which he dies, and when he dies. Before his death, he asks how he could possibly be blamed for doing what he did, saying he wanted to do what the Timerangers were doing for themselves; make a better future.

==== Navigator Robo Tac ====
Navigator Robo Tac (ナビゲーターロボタック, Nabigētā Robo Takku): A robotic owl who transmits the launch of the Time Jets. Tac was given information on many of the events that were intended to happen in the year 2000, though when data on the Great Extinction is erased from his memory, Tac begins to question his usefulness. It is not until Sion convinces him that he is not worthless, that Tac feels confident in himself again. He can detect Space-Time Pulses and helps the team in making plans.

==== Wataru Asami ====
Wataru Asami (浅見 渡, Asami Wataru): Tatsuya's billionaire father who is the leader of the Asami Group, one of the largest business corporations in Japan. Wataru is a ruthless individual who is only concerned with business matters and tries to control Tatsuya's life, thinking that his son is only meant to succeed him. Wataru also organizes the City Guardians as a means of protecting the city from the Londerz Family and finds out that his son is Time Red when his helmet is broken. Wataru eventually agrees to allow Naoto to become the City Guardians' leader after he gains control of the V-Rex and attempts to recruit the other Timerangers into the City Guardians, but is turned down. Eventually, Wataru is hospitalized during Gien's attack on the City Guardian headquarters. After Yuri and the Timerangers depart for 3000, Wataru decides to allow Tatsuya to live his own life until he feels that he is ready to join the Asami Group.

==== Honami Moriyama ====
Honami Moriyama (森山 ホナミ, Moriyama Honami): A reporter and photographer, the only one daring enough to take photographs of the Londerz Family. She first interferes in the Timerangers' battle against Gougan and is scolded by Time Pink for her foolishness, but Time Yellow is able to cheer her up. Unbeknownst to the Timerangers, Honami has taken their pictures while they are in their civilian forms, but she chooses to keep these pictures to herself, and quits taking pictures of them and the Londerz. Honami develops a crush on Time Yellow, yet she believes that Ayase is Time Yellow, going so far as keeping a picture of Ayase and Time Yellow side-by-side in her wallet. Sion finds out that Honami is in love with Domon and gives her his own e-mail address. Eventually, Domon finds out about the confusion when he notices Honami's wallet on the ground after he arrives late for a date and sees Ayase's picture in it. Domon tries to set up Honami with Ayase and, in the end, Honami's misunderstanding is cleared up when Domon is willing to protect her from Banjan's bomb. The two start dating, and at the end of the series Honami has a son whom she names Mirai, but Domon only discovers his existence a decade later during the events of Kaizoku Sentai Gokaiger.

==== Time Robota ====
Time Robota (タイムロボター, Taimu Robotā): Created by Sion to serve as Tac's robotic assistant, a cheerful and talkative little robot which often announces everything as "It's [blank] time!". Robota functions to protect their headquarters when the Timerangers are away. It relays messages, sounds off its opinions and, when Tac requires it, acts as an alarm clock.

==== Tatsumi family ====
Kyuukyuu Sentai GoGoFive: Team up with the Timerangers during Timeranger VS GoGoFive. They face off against Pierre, the surviving footman of the Psyma family (despite GoGoFive's assumptions that they had killed him), who teamed with the Londerz in a plan to take out both teams. During the Super Sentai Compilation's segment on GoGoFive, the team instantly recognizes them due to their team-up.

=== Londerz Family ===
The Londerz Family (ロンダーズファミリー, Rondāzu Famirī) are the main antagonists of Timeranger. Their base of operations is the Londer Prison (ロンダー刑務所, Rondā Keimusho), which their group is named after.

==== Don Dolnero ====
Don Dolnero (ドン・ドルネロ, Don Dorunero) is a Dogosabaian and the former crime boss of the Dolnero family (ドルネロズファミリ, Dorunero Famirī). He was to be detained for 1,000 years, as Prisoner #35273, until his gang takes over the prison and goes back in time to pull off numerous crimes. With Borg's help, he takes over a company to make even more money, setting up a "protection business". When Gien releases Emboss, Dolnero provides his blood to the Timerangers so the City Guardians can make the vaccine before he controls Gien with a shut down key to stop him from going too far in his psychotic delights. Once the shut down key is removed and destroyed, Dolnero evacuates the Londer Prison before going out to kill Gien. Dolnero is unable to carry out the deed and is killed.

==== Gien ====
Gien (ギエン, Gien) is an evil and insane robotic scientist. He is responsible for constructing the Zenits that are sent against the Timerangers. Gien is actually a lich/insectoid-themed cyborg with a crustacean-like claw for a left hand who started out as a mentally-challenged human boy. After Glen is nearly killed by the Kronz family, Don Dolnero saves his life by having a friend of his transfer Glen's brain into a robotic body. After seeing the G-Zord in action, Gien creates a device to drain the power from the G-Zord and then from the Timerangers robots. Eventually, Tatsuya arrives to help his friends, defeating Gien before destroying his device. Though the G-Zord is destroyed, Gien uses the Lambda-2000 he stole to assume his role as the "God of Destruction". Dolnero eventually tries everything in his power to stop Gien, only to die in his vain attempt. Gien later pilots the Neo-Crisis robot, wired into his creation as he destroys everything in his path. After Tatsuya saves the future by destroying Neo-Crisis, Gien's original personality resurfaces as he dies.

==== Lila ====
Lila (リラ, Rira): Don Dolnero's right hand girl with pink hair. Rather obnoxious, she is a mistress of disguise and good with a pistol. A material girl, she frequently steals clothing and jewelry that suit her fancy. She mostly sticks around Don Dolnero as he has two aspects she adores: money and power. She admits she likes him a bit, even if he lacks them. After Dolnero's death, Lila escapes the year 2001 to avoid the Great Extinction.

==== Zenits ====
Junk Droid Zenits (ジャンクドロイド・ゼニット, Janku Doroido Zenitto): Cheap one-eyed droids created by Gien from scrap, the Zenits are activated when a Londerz criminal tosses a bunch of nuts and bolts that transform into one-eyed robots. The Zenits wield sword-like handguns and can assume human form. When Gien leaves Dolnero, he takes most of the Zenits with him to assist him in his plans, upgrading their armor prior to the raid on the City Guardian headquarters so the City Guardians' weapons would no longer have any effect on them.

==== Londerz Prisoners ====
In the 30th century, criminals that are either aliens, cyborgs, or robots are taken to the Londer Prison to be frozen and compressed for room. When their Depression Seal (抑制シール, Yokusei Shīru) comes off, a prisoner undergoes the Rebound (リバウンド, Ribaundo) process, growing to incredible size as a side effect of the freeze compression.

- Mad Bomber Jekkar (爆弾魔・ジェッカー, Bakudanma Jekkā; 2): A Chutotenian serial bomber who was to be imprisoned for 120 years. He was first of the Londerz prisoners to be thawed and unleashed to cause havoc in the city, using his bombs to threaten the government into providing him cash.
- Cash Extortionist Keys (現金強奪犯・キース, Genkin Gōdatsuhan Kīsu; 3): A Kojimian extortionist placed in 50-year freeze-compression for using his species's talent for controlling machines to steal 30 billion yen. He can hack into any computer and latch on any large machine such as cars to control it as if it was part of his own body.
- Serial Kidnapper Nabal (連続誘拐犯・ナバル, Renzoku Yūkaihan Nabaaru; 4): An Ostejian inventor and member of the Depression Seals who was placed in 200-year freeze-compression for kidnapping and murder.
- Hitman Mad Blast (殺し屋・マッドブラスト, Koroshiya Maddo Burasuto; 5): A Uzumaian hitman who likes killing, taking items from his victims as mementos. Sealed for 15 years with not enough proof to confirm his crimes, he was the one who murdered Yuuri's family.
- Jewel Thief Rouge (宝石窃盗犯・ルージェ, Hōseki Settoōhan Rūje; 6): A Tattorian girl with a red eye who, like Lila, has an obsession for jewelry and was jailed for making strike three. She is able to assume the guises of others, with the bird tattoo on her neck being her only distinguishing feature.
- Corrupt Murder Doctor Doku (悪徳殺人医・ドク, Akutoku Satsujini Doku; 7): A surgical vivisection robot who was in for 500 years for medical malpractice. Brought in by Time Robo Alpha.
- Hijacker Nabokov (ハイジャック犯・ナボコフ, Haijakkuhan Nabokofu; 8): A robot who is able to assume jet form for swift kidnappings.
- Corrupt Officer Arnold K (悪徳警察官・アーノルドＫ, Akutoku Keisatsukan Ānorudo Kei; 9): A corrupt cyborg traffic cop who was one of the Don's best friends, before Dolnero found Gien and Lila, using his authority as a police officer to mug people.
- Mercenary Org (傭兵・オーグ, Yōhei Ōgu; 10): A Spiklean assassin with dinosaur-like textures. Org possesses superhuman strength, wields a broadsword, and can shoot lasers from his eyes.
- Sadist Gougan (愉快犯・ゴウガン, Yukaihan Gōgan; 11): A cyborg criminal who was arrested in 2975 for using his mind control machine to turn people into mobs to kill each other for his amusement.
- Blackmailer Gaymark (恐喝犯・ゲーマルク, Kyōkatsuhan Gēmaruku; 12 & 45): A Gaymarukian master of blackmail who wields a laser whip weapon.
- Gambler Velito (賭博師・ベリト, Tobakushi Berito; 13): A Polyposian that consists of a small alien with a robotic/machine exosuit. He was sentenced to 20 years in confinement. Velito was originally a casino owner who would fix the fights to win gambling bets.
- Mad Racer Baron (マッドレーサー・バロン, Maddo Rēsā Baron; 14): A Kanalian former hotshot race car driver, and friend of Ayase. Baron was previously convicted with Ayase's testimony for reckless driving that resulted in a hurt driver. After challenging Ayase to another race, Ayase helps Baron see the error of his ways when he gets in the way of Baron's car to avoid hitting pedestrians.
- Sniper Reihou (スナイパー・レイホウ, Sunaipā Reihō; 15): A Kisakuian assassin who was released by Don Dolnero to assassinate the Timerangers, though she was only willing to do it for seven million dollars per each ranger. She uses a unique type of laser that allows her to penetrate the Timeranger's Chrono Suits.
- Gourmet Pyromaniac Vincent (美食放火魔・ビンセント, Bishoku Hōkama Binsento; 16): An Mincharian food critic who was sentenced for 180 years, though he was released by Gien. Armed with a fork-staff and able to shoot fire from his mouth, he attacked people whose cooking he found horrible, burning their eating establishments to the ground.
- Blackmailing School Gang Leader Flan (恐喝番長・フラン, Kyōkatsu Banchō Furan; 17 & 38): A Jubenaian gangster in a green mohawk who was released by Lila to increase money supply for the Londerz. Assuming the guise of a teacher, he took over Nanjo Middle School, conditioning strong students to bully and extort the weaker students.
- Terrorist Sandoora (テロリスト・サンドーラ, Terorisuto Sandōra; 18 & 38): A Hamedoshan terrorist who was hired by Gien to retrieve the Lambda 2000.
- Bodyguard Hydrid (用心棒・ハイドリッド, Yōjinbō Haidoriddo; 21 & 38): An Iyahian criminal who was given 105 years for murder as a mafia bodyguard. He was released by Don Dolnero to aid him in his distribution of the Power Spritty, a neo-alcohol from the 30th century that could severely intoxicate humans, with aliens being unaffected by it.
- Marriage Con Artist Barbera (結婚詐欺師・バーベラ, Kekkon Sagishi Bābera; 22 & 38): A Yukowaian con artist who was arrested for her ability to seduce men and then rip them off into giving her money after they became obsessed with her. Barbera is released by Lila so she could use Barbera's talents to make money for the Londerz.
- Energy Thief Uugo (エネルギー窃盗犯・ウーゴ, Enerugī Settōhan Ūgo; 23): A Marshallian who was imprisoned for three years due to his reckless energy consumption. Uugo is able to release deadly radiation when injured.
- Assaulter Borg (傷害犯・ボーグ, Shōgaihan Bōgu; 24): A robotic bomber who was imprisoned for 10 years before being released to cause trouble with his love for violence. The violence he caused allowed Don Dolnero to set up his own company in the aftermath.
- Mad Scientist Genbu (狂気の科学者・ゲンブ, Kyōki no Kagakusha Genbu; 25 & 26): A cyborg turtle-themed criminal and scientist who was arrested for using people in experiments to create a space within space only to fail. Released by Don Dolnero, Genbu is paid 50 million to eliminate the Timerangers.
- Esthetician Domiiro (エステティシャン・ドミーロ, Esutetishan Domīro; 27 & 38): A Megamiuan beautician who will do anything for money, whether it is legal or not. She was released to help Lila in her leisure at a resort for 10 million yen.
- Arms Smuggler Hammer (武器密売人・ハマー, Buki Mitsubainin Hamā; 29): A Yumateroian arms smuggler who was released by Gien to track down the pulse sent from the V-Rex's control unit.
- Poacher Master Hunter (密猟者・マスターハンター, Mitsuryōsha Masutā Hantā; 30 & 38): A Bounterian who was released by Gien to track down the V-Rex.
- Counselor Zektar (カウンセラー・ゼクター, Kaunserā Zakutā; 31): A Hakaaian mental health counselor who went bad and used his Mind Modulator to damage his patients' minds, forcing them back and gaining more money. Once they were broke, Zektar would imprison them and use them in his experiments.
- Bomb-Maker D.D. Ladis (爆弾製造犯・Ｄ.Ｄ.ラデス, Bakudan Seizōhan Dī Dī Radesu; 1 & 32): A Nidareian who was arrested for making bombs while unaware they would be used for crimes. Ladis was labeled an accomplice and was sentenced for 20 years in suspended animation, undergoing freeze-compression right before Don Dolnero. Though thawed, Don Dolnero was going to kill D.D. Ladis for being useless until Gien implanted an irremovable hypnopierce to make him obedient. Time Green uses the Assault Vector's Sniper Mode to remove the hypnopierce from Ladis.
- Loan Shark Dogoal (悪徳金融業者・ドゴール, Akutoku Kinyū Gyōsha Dogōru; 33): A Doyokian with a lobster-like claw for a right hand that shoots energy blasts and mollusca-like armored plating on his body. He ran a loan shark business for the Don, kidnapping the family of bankers in debt to the Don.
- Stalker Detective Abel (ストーカー刑事・アベル, Stōkā Keiji Aberu; 34): An Inter-City cyborg police officer who turned villainous and became an assassin using a mind control gas to recruit others into his assassin group.
- Hacker Jugend (ハッカー・ユーゲント, Hakkā Yūgento; 35 & 38): A Zunohaian hacker with a large brain. Under the guise of an old man, he uploads a computer virus into every hospital mainframe, demanding fifty million yen for each patient for the anti-virus he possesses.
- Dinal (ディナール, Dināru): A Gaymarukian and identical cousin of Blackmailer Gaymark who appeared in Mirai Sentai Timeranger vs. GoGoFive.
- Lupia (ルピア, Rupia): A Kisakuian and twin sister of Sniper Reihou who appeared in Mirai Sentai Timeranger vs. GoGoFive.
- Real (レアル, Rearu): A Doyokian and younger twin brother of Loan Shark Dogoal who appeared in Mirai Sentai Timeranger vs. GoGoFive.
- Bats (バーツ, Bātsu): A Spiklean and identical uncle of Mercenary Org who appeared in Mirai Sentai Timeranger vs. GoGoFive.
- Killer Boxer Boribaru (殺人ボクサー・ボリバル, Satsujin Bokusā Boribaru): A Rokivian boxer who appears in Mirai Sentai Timeranger vs. GoGoFive. He was previously arrested for killing 500 people in hand-to-hand combat with no remorse. Boribaru later fused with Spell-Master Pierre through a forbidden spell to become the boxer/housefly-themed BoriPierre (ボリピエール, Boripiēru). The Timerangers managed to defeat this form which resulted in the exorcism of Spell-Master Pierre who flies off and the Timerangers arresting Boribaru.
- Arms Dealer Banjan (武器商人・バンジャン, Buki Shōnin Banjan; 36): An unidentified alien arms dealer who sold deadly bombs to gangsters until City Guardians went in disguise to arrange a setup to find his hideout.
- Saboteur Mayden (破壊工作員・メイデン, Hakai Kōsakuin Meiden; 37): An Ikakian designer of various robots and sabotage specialist, his most famous being the V-Rex.
- Spirited Filmmaker Glokan (魂の活動屋・グロカン, Tamashii no Katsudōya Gurokan; 38): A criminal who is themed after a film director and armed with a megaphone.
- Serial Thief Dorpa (連続窃盗犯・ドーバ, Renzoku Settōhan Dōba; 40): A Rubaroian thief sent by Dolnero to steal the soon-to-be-completed Reda Virus vaccine from the City Guardians, so the Londerz Family could sell it to make a great profit out of its importance after it is finished.
- Prophet Strauss (予言者・ストラウス, Yogensha Sutorausu; 41): A telekinetic Saikian who was arrested for making money on the followers he amassed with his false prophecy that the Earth would come to an end in 3001. Released by Don Dolnero and creating the figurehead Hakuou, Strauss sets up another doomsday cult with his false prophecy set for 2001.
- Computer Engineer Gate (コンピューターエンジニア・ゲート, Konpyūtā Enjinia Gēto; 46): An arrogant Shouroozian and computer engineer, he opts out of being refrozen for the Londerz to escape the Great Extinction of 2001 and instead plans to hold the Space Research Institute for ransom by blowing up a reactor if one billion yen is not paid in an hour.

===== Hell's Gate Prisoners =====
These are Londerz Prisoners confined in a special section of the Londerz Prison for the most evil and inhuman acts of the 30th century. Only Gien has the key to the vault that holds them, and he thaws them out so they can terrorize everyone for his own amusement and kill the Timerangers for himself.

- Hell's Gate Prisoner Blaster Mad (ヘルズゲート囚・ブラスターマドウ, Heruzu Gēto Shū Burasutā Madō; 20): A Hattbakian who was imprisoned for the murder of 1,030 people.
- Hell's Gate Prisoner Jagur (ヘルズゲート囚・ジャグル, Heruzu Gēto Shū Jaguru; 28 & 38): A Gekishaian who was released by Gien to locate a space-time pulse and strengthen it with a machine. Before being recaptured, Jagur succeeds in strengthening the space-time pulse that allows the V-Rex to emerge.
- Hell's Gate Prisoner Emboss (ヘルズゲート囚・エンボス, Heruzu Gēto Shū Enbosu; 39): An Atobreian scientist who was infected with a fatal disease, a bio-weapon known as the Reda Virus. Even if a cure was made for him, it was too late for him and he wanted to take others by the thousands down with him for revenge.
- Hell's Gate Prisoner Harbal (ヘルズゲート囚・ハーバル, Heruzu Gēto Shū Hābaru; 42): A destructive, murderous Walusian armed with a bazooka. Harbal was released by Gien to obtain the Lambda 2000 from the 3rd R&D Lab.

==== Robots ====
The following robots were built by Gien:

- Catastrophic Weapon Nova (破壊兵器・ノヴァ, Hakai Heiki Nova; 18 & 19): A Zenit-headed robot created by Gien and powered by Zeta-3. Upon being put through the compression-freezing and being unleashed, Gien enlarges his creation in a bid to destroy the city.
- Combat Bio-Robot G-Zord (生体戦闘ロボットGゾード, Seitai Sentō Robotto Ji Zōdo; 43 & 44): A dragon-like energy reactor robot that was lost in a time experiment like the V-Rex in 2994. Though immune to all forms of external attacks, its only weak point is its mute-energy reactor. The Timerangers destroy G-Zord, saving the 30th century and altering history so that the Great Extinction occurs in 2001.
- MechaCrisis (メカ・クライシス, Meka Kuraishisu; 46 & 47): A robot with a UFO-shaped head, a hatchet hammer for a right hand, and a machine gun for a left hand. Created by Gien and powered by Zeta-3, MechaCrisis is sent to destroy the city.
- NeoCrisis (ネオ・クライシス, Neo Kuraishisu; 48–50): Gien's final robot. NeoCrisis resembles Gien and was created by him to battle the V-Rex. Powered by Lambda-2000, it is also programmed to synchronize with its creator's movements. The robot is eventually destroyed by the V-Rex's Max Burning, killing Gien in the process.

== Episodes ==
| No. | Title | Directed by | Written by | Original release date |
|---|---|---|---|---|
| 1 | "The Time Fugitives" "Toki no Tōbōsha" (時の逃亡者) | Satoshi Morota | Yasuko Kobayashi | February 13, 2000 |
| 2 | "The Unseen Future" "Mienai Mirai" (見えない未来) | Satoshi Morota | Yasuko Kobayashi | February 20, 2000 |
| 3 | "The Acceleration of Dreams" "Yume no Kasokudo" (夢の加速度) | Noboru Matsui | Yasuko Kobayashi | February 27, 2000 |
| 4 | "The Hostage is an Alien" "Hitojichi wa Iseijin" (人質は異星人) | Noboru Matsui | Yasuko Kobayashi | March 5, 2000 |
| 5 | "The Third Formation" "Daisan no Gattai" (第３の合体) | Hajime Konaka | Yasuko Kobayashi | March 12, 2000 |
| 6 | "The Fabricated Invitee" "Itsuwari no Shōtaikyaku" (偽りの招待客) | Hajime Konaka | Yasuko Kobayashi | March 19, 2000 |
| 7 | "Domon Hospitalized" "Domon Nyūinchū" (ドモン入院中) | Satoshi Morota | Yasuko Kobayashi | March 26, 2000 |
| 8 | "An Explosion in the Arts" "Geijutsu ni Bakuhatsu o" (芸術に爆発を) | Satoshi Morota | Ryōta Yamaguchi | April 2, 2000 |
| 9 | "The Don's Melancholy" "Don no Yūutsu" (ドンの憂鬱) | Taro Sakamoto | Yasuko Kobayashi | April 9, 2000 |
| 10 | "The Escape to Tomorrow" "Ashita e no Dasshutsu" (明日への脱出) | Taro Sakamoto | Yasuko Kobayashi | April 16, 2000 |
| 11 | "Death Match City" "Shitō no Machi" (死闘の町) | Hajime Konaka | Yasuko Kobayashi | April 23, 2000 |
| 12 | "Wish Upon a Star" "Hoshi ni Negai o" (星に願いを) | Hajime Konaka | Ryōta Yamaguchi | April 30, 2000 |
| 13 | "Battle Casino" "Batoru Kajino" (バトルカジノ) | Satoshi Morota | Yasuko Kobayashi | May 7, 2000 |
| 14 | "Dead Heat" "Deddo Hīto" (デッドヒート) | Satoshi Morota | Toshiki Inoue | May 14, 2000 |
| 15 | "Search for the Sniper" "Sunaipā o Sagase" (狙撃手(スナイパー)を探せ) | Taro Sakamoto | Yasuko Kobayashi | May 21, 2000 |
| 16 | "A Dream of Soba" "Soba ni Aru Yume" (そばにある夢) | Taro Sakamoto | Ryōta Yamaguchi | May 28, 2000 |
| 17 | "The Twisted Holy Fist" "Nejireta Seiken" (ねじれた正拳) | Hajime Konaka | Ryōta Yamaguchi | June 4, 2000 |
| 18 | "A Shadowy Premonition" "Kage no Yokan" (影の予感) | Hajime Konaka | Yasuko Kobayashi | June 11, 2000 |
| 19 | "The Moonlight Knight" "Gekka no Kishi" (月下の騎士) | Noboru Matsui | Yasuko Kobayashi | June 25, 2000 |
| 20 | "The Renewed Bond" "Aratanaru Kizuna" (新たなる絆) | Noboru Matsui | Yasuko Kobayashi | July 2, 2000 |
| 21 | "Sion's Style" "Shion no Ryūgi" (シオンの流儀) | Satoshi Morota | Yasuko Kobayashi | July 9, 2000 |
| 22 | "Pink Temptation" "Momoiro no Yūwaku" (桃色の誘惑) | Satoshi Morota | Toshiki Inoue | July 16, 2000 |
| 23 | "Beat Up" "Bīto Appu" (ビートアップ) | Hajime Konaka | Ryōta Yamaguchi | July 23, 2000 |
| 24 | "Yellow, Sometimes Blue" "Kiiro, Tokidoki Ao" (黄色、時々青) | Hajime Konaka | Yasuko Kobayashi | July 30, 2000 |
| 25 | "Broken Trust" "Togireta Shinrai" (途切れた信頼) | Noboru Matsui | Yasuko Kobayashi | August 6, 2000 |
| 26 | "The Countdown of Trust" "Shinrai no Kauntodaun" (信頼の秒読み(カウントダウン)) | Noboru Matsui | Yasuko Kobayashi | August 13, 2000 |
| 27 | "The Small Hometown" "Chiisa na Kokyō" (小さな故郷) | Satoshi Morota | Yasuko Kobayashi | August 20, 2000 |
| 28 | "A Time of Reunion" "Saikai no Toki" (再会の時) | Satoshi Morota | Yasuko Kobayashi | August 27, 2000 |
| 29 | "The Fiery New Warrior" "Honō no Shin Senshi" (炎の新戦士) | Hiroshi Butsuda | Yasuko Kobayashi | September 3, 2000 |
| 30 | "The Roar of Fire" "Todoke Honō no Sakebi" (届け炎の叫び) | Hiroshi Butsuda | Yasuko Kobayashi | September 10, 2000 |
| 31 | "Delusion Game" "Meisō Gēmu" (迷走ゲーム) | Noboru Matsui | Yasuko Kobayashi | September 17, 2000 |
| 32 | "Save the Criminal" "Hanzaisha o Sukue" (犯罪者を救え) | Noboru Matsui | Ryōta Yamaguchi | October 1, 2000 |
| 33 | "Little Lady" "Ritoru Redi" (リトルレディ) | Hajime Konaka | Yasuko Kobayashi | October 8, 2000 |
| 34 | "Assassin" "An-satsu-sha" (暗・殺・者) | Hajime Konaka | Yasuko Kobayashi | October 15, 2000 |
| 35 | "Tomorrow Isn't Coming" "Ashita ga Konai" (明日が来ない) | Satoshi Morota | Ryōta Yamaguchi | October 22, 2000 |
| 36 | "By Keeping Honest" "Sugao no Mama de" (素顔のままで) | Satoshi Morota | Yasuko Kobayashi | October 29, 2000 |
| 37 | "The Sought-After Power" "Nerawareta Chikara" (狙われた力) | Taro Sakamoto | Yasuko Kobayashi | November 5, 2000 |
| 38 | "Good Night" "Guddo Naito" (ぐっどないと) | Taro Sakamoto | Yasuko Kobayashi | November 12, 2000 |
| 39 | "A Lie Soaked in Rain" "Ame ni Nureta Uso" (雨に濡れた嘘) | Hajime Konaka | Yasuko Kobayashi | November 19, 2000 |
| 40 | "Ayase Retires!?" "Ayase Dattai!?" (アヤセ脱退！？) | Hajime Konaka | Yasuko Kobayashi | November 26, 2000 |
| 41 | "Expose the Prophet" "Yogensha o Abake" (予言者を暴け) | Satoshi Morota | Yasuko Kobayashi | December 3, 2000 |
| 42 | "The Fallen Angel of Destruction" "Hakai no Datenshi" (破壊の堕天使) | Satoshi Morota | Yasuko Kobayashi | December 10, 2000 |
| 43 | "The History Correction Order" "Rekishi Shūsei Shirei" (歴史修正指令) | Satoshi Morota | Yasuko Kobayashi | December 17, 2000 |
| 44 | "The Revolt Against Time" "Toki e no Hangyaku" (時への反逆) | Noboru Matsui | Yasuko Kobayashi | December 24, 2000 |
| 45 | "The End! Tomorrow Research" "Shūmatsu! Tumorō Risāchi" (終末！ＴＲ) | Shojiro Nakazawa | Ryōta Yamaguchi | December 31, 2000 |
| 46 | "Cut Off From the Future" "Mirai e no Danzetsu" (未来への断絶) | Noboru Matsui | Yasuko Kobayashi | January 7, 2001 |
| 47 | "The End of the Don" "Don no Saigo" (ドンの最期) | Hajime Konaka | Yasuko Kobayashi | January 14, 2001 |
| 48 | "The Return to the Future" "Mirai e no Kikan" (未来への帰還) | Hajime Konaka | Yasuko Kobayashi | January 21, 2001 |
| 49 | "Beyond the Millennium" "Sennen o Koete" (千年を越えて) | Taro Sakamoto | Yasuko Kobayashi | January 28, 2001 |
| 50 | "To an Infinite Tomorrow" "Mugen no Ashita e" (無限の明日へ) | Taro Sakamoto | Yasuko Kobayashi | February 4, 2001 |
| 51 | "Super Sentai Compilation" "Sūpā Sentai Dai Shūgō (Tokubetsu Hen)" (スーパー戦隊大集合（特別編）) | Noboru Takemoto | Noboru Takemoto | February 11, 2001 |
A special episode

== V-Cinema ==
=== All the Strongest Hero Secrets ===
This is a direct-to-video release made specifically for Mirai Sentai Timeranger. It talks about the Timerangers' story so far and showcases the Timerangers' weapons and mecha.

=== Mirai Sentai Timeranger vs. GoGoFive ===
A direct-to-video movie released on March 9, 2001. Taking place on October 25, 2000, between cases 35 and 36, the Timerangers confront the Londerz prisoner Boribaru, who somehow resists the Voltech Bazooka and runs off. This infuriates Matoi Tatsumi who, with his siblings, are dealing with the fire Boribaru caused to call the Timerangers out, and he criticizes the Timerangers for lacking any spirit. Later, unaware of their civilian identities, the Tatsumi siblings arrive at Tomorrow Research to get help in finding their father, who mysteriously disappeared, along with their GoGo Braces. When Tac alerts them to a Londerz attack, the Timerangers confront relatives of the Londerz prisoners they defeated with the Tatsumi siblings watching them transform from afar. By then, it is revealed that the Londerz prisoners' new-found invincibility is the work of Spell Master Pierre, the surviving servant of the Psyma family. However, just as Pierre is about to get his revenge, Mondo comes to his children's aid and gives them their GoGo Braces to help the Timerangers. The two Sentai teams fight the prisoners until Pierre makes Boribaru powerful enough to create a space-time distortion that sucks all combatants into pocket dimensions. While others fight for their lives against the prisoners with their transformation devices disabled, Pierre tries to stop Mondo from getting the Sentai teams back until Time Fire intervenes. Having Naoto call in V-Rex, who scares Pierre away, Tac links himself to its Chrono Unit while having Naoto order his robot to create a time hole for the teams to assume their Sentai forms and defeat the prisoners, while returning to their time. With Time Fire joining in, the Timerangers and GoGoFive manage to recapture the Londerz relatives. However, left behind by Don Dolnero and his group, Pierre is forced to use a Psyma Fusion spell with Boribaru to become Pierre Bori, who overpowers Time Robo and Time Shadow (タイムシャドウ, Taimu Shadō). But in a gambit that could tear apart the fabric of time, Mondo takes advantage to Time Robo's hammer spacetime to call Max Liner and Go Liner from 1999 so the GoGoFive can form Victory Robo. With Victory Robo transferring the energies of its Victory Prominence to Time Robo, it assumes the Riding Time Robo (ライディングタイムロボ, Raidingu Taimu Robo) formation with V-Rex to perform the Pressure Prominence (プレッシャープロミネンス, Puresshā Purominensu) finisher to both destroy Pierre and arrest Boribaru. Soon after, as the GoGoFive mecha return to 1999, the two sentai teams part on good terms.

== Cast ==
- Tatsuya Asami, Captain Ryuya: Masaru Nagai (永井 大, Nagai Masaru) (Played as "永井 マサル")
- Yuri: Mika Katsumura (勝村 美香, Katsumura Mika)
- Ayase: Yūji Kido (城戸 裕次, Kido Yūji)
- Domon: Shūhei Izumi (和泉 宗兵, Izumi Shūhei) (Played as Tomohide Koizumi (小泉 朋英, Koizumi Tomohide))
- Sion: Masahiro Kuranuki (倉貫 匡弘, Kuranuki Masahiro)
- Naoto Takizawa: Shinji Kasahara (笠原 紳司, Kasahara Shinji)
- Wataru Asami: Fujita Okamoto (岡本 富士太, Okamoto Fujita)
- Honami Moriyama: Tamao Yoshimura (吉村 玉緒, Yoshimura Tamao)
- Lila: Asami Kuru (久瑠 あさ美, Kuru Asami)
- Narrator: Yukitoshi Hori (堀 之紀, Hori Yukitoshi)

=== Voice cast ===
- Don Dolnero: Ryūzaburō Ōtomo (大友 龍三郎, Ōtomo Ryūzaburō)
- Gien: Kōji Tobe (戸部 公爾, Tobe Kōji)
- Navigator Robo Tac: Yūsuke Numata (沼田 祐介, Numata Yūsuke)
- Time Robota: Fumiko Orikasa (折笠 富美子, Orikasa Fumiko)

== Songs ==
Opening theme

- "Jikū ~Mirai Sentai Timeranger~" (JIKŪ ～未来戦隊タイムレンジャー～, Jikū ~Mirai Sentai Taimurenjā~)
  - Lyrics: Yoshie Isogai (磯谷 佳江, Isogai Yoshie)
  - Composition & Arrangement: Kōichirō Kameyama
  - Artist: Kumi Sasaki (佐々木 久美, Sasaki Kumi)

Ending theme

- "Toki no Kanata e" (時の彼方へ; "Into Time")
  - Lyrics: Shōichi Yoshii (吉井 省一, Yoshii Shōichi)
  - Composition & Arrangement: Kōichirō Kameyama
  - Artist: Nat's
- "Beyond All Space and Time"
  - Artist: Kumi Sasaki (佐々木 久美, Sasaki Kumi)
  - Timeranger vs. GoGo Five's ending theme. An English version of the series opening theme.
- "Miracle Xmas" (ミラクル☆Xmas, Mirakuru Ekksumasu)
  - Lyrics: Kiyomi Katō
  - Composition & Arrangement: Kōichirō Kameyama
  - Artist: T.R.Futures (Masaru Nagai (Tatsuya), Mika Katsumura (Yuri), Yuuji Kido (Ayase), Shuhei Izumi (Domon), Masahiro Kuranuki (Sion))
  - Episode 44's ending theme
- "Eternal Wind"
  - Lyrics: Takako Shingetsu
  - Composition & Arrangement: Kōtarō Nakagawa
  - Artist: Naritaka Takayama
  - Episode 45's ending theme
- "Where the Future Take Us" (未来のゆくえ, Mirai o Yukue)
  - Lyrics: Yoshie Isogai
  - Composition, Arrangement, & Performance: Motoyoshi Iwasaki
  - Final episode's ending theme
- "Don't Stop Your Story!"
  - Lyrics: Yukari Yamato
  - Composition & Arrangement: Taku Iwasaki
  - Artist: T.R.Futures
  - Special Compilation's ending theme
