= Undead Pool =

- Directed by: Koji Kawano
- Written by: Satoshi Owada
- Starring: Sasa Handa
- Release date: 2007
- Running time: 78 minutes
- Country: Japan
- Language: Japanese

Undead Pool (女子競泳反乱軍, Joshi Kyōei Hanrangun; "Girls' Swim Rebel Army"), aka Attack Girls' Swim Team vs. The Undead, is a 2007 Japanese erotic horror film.

== Cast ==
- Sasa Handa as Aki
- Yuria Hidaka as Sayaka
- Ayumi Tokitō as Mariko
- Mizuka Arai
- Hiromitsu Kiba
