= Fresh Kill =

1994 US experimental film by Shu Lea Cheang

- Film poster
- Directed by: Shu Lea Cheang
- Written by: Jessica Hagedorn
- Produced by: Jennifer Fong; Shari Frilot
- Starring: Sarita Choudhury; Erin McMurtry; Abraham Lim; José Zúñiga; Laurie Carlos
- Cinematography: Jane Castle
- Edited by: Lauren Zuckerman
- Music by: Vernon Reid
- Production companies: Airwaves Project; ITVS; Channel Four Films
- Distributed by: Strand Releasing
- Release dates: April 23, 1994 (USA Film Festival); January 12, 1996 (United States)
- Running time: 80 minutes
- Countries: United Kingdom; United States
- Language: English

Fresh Kill is a 1994 experimental film directed by Shu Lea Cheang and written by Jessica Hagedorn. It stars Sarita Choudhury and Erin McMurtry as Shareen Lightfoot and Claire Mayakovsky, two lesbian parents who are drawn into a corporate conspiracy involving the Fresh Kills Landfill. Fresh Kill was an official selection at the 1994 Berlin International Film Festival and the Toronto International Film Festival and is noted for its influence on hacker subculture, with an article about the film for the now-defunct hacker publication InfoNation containing one of the first uses of the term "hacktivism".

== Synopsis ==
Shareen Lightfoot and Claire Mayakovsky raise their daughter Honey near the Fresh Kills Landfill on Staten Island in New York City. Shareen works as a salvager recovering refuse from the landfill, while Claire works as a waitress at a sushi restaurant. The city is heavily contaminated with pollution that adversely affects local animals and food; Claire brings home contaminated fish from the restaurant that is eaten by Honey, who begins glowing green and then vanishes. Shareen and Claire discover that the multinational GX Corporation is responsible for the pollution and Honey's disappearance, and become involved in an effort to hack and expose the company with sushi chef and hacker Jiannbin Lui, and poet and dishwasher Miguel Flores.

== Cast ==
Sources:

- Sarita Choudhury as Shareen Lightfoot
- Pedro Pietri as Condom Poet
- Kate Valk as Mother Mary
- Abraham Lincoln Lim as Jiannbin Lui
- Ching Valdes-Aran as Boss Man
- Erin McMurtry as Claire Mayakovsky
- Will Kempe as Stuart Sterling
- José Zúñiga as Miguel Flores
- Laurie Carlos as Mimi Mayakovsk
- Nelini Stamp as Honey
- Ron Vawter as Roger Bailey
- Robbie McCauley as Nina Simpson
- Karen Finley as Bernadette Cherryhome
- Rino Thunder as Clayton Lightfoot, Sr.
- Nicky Paraiso as Supermarket Manager
- Alva Rogers as Woman in Locker
- Jessica Hagedorn as Bookseller
- George C. Wolfe as Cat Lover

== Production ==
Fresh Kill was directed by Shu Lea Cheang and written by Jessica Hagedorn. The film bills itself as "eco cyber noia", the term "cyber noia" (or "cybernoia") having been coined by Cheang to describe "massive intrusions of networking technology into people's lives," and what she foresaw as "a future where multinational media empires clash with hackers." Cheang has stated that the film was motivated by a desire to depict the relationship between the media and environmental racism, drawing parallels between the dumping of industrial toxic waste in the Third World with "the dumping of garbage TV programs" into Third World countries. Hagedorn has stated that she wished to invert typical expectations and cliché stock characters, though sought not to "reverse things for their own sake," noting that Honey's parentage and the differing races of characters with direct biological relations are specifically never explained.

== Release ==
The film premiered on April 23, 1994, at the USA Film Festival, and was an official selection at the 1994 Berlin International Film Festival and at the Toronto International Film Festival. It was released theatrically in the United States on January 12, 1996. Fresh Kill also screened at the Whitney Biennial in 1995, and at the Asian American International Film Festival in 2019.

== Reception and legacy ==
Fresh Kill is described by Cheang herself as a work of eco-cybernoia. An environment in which the inability to access the media of change causes the uprising of low-fi activism and hacker mentality, or “hacktivism” if you will.

— Jason Logan in InfoNation, November 1995

In a review for The Los Angeles Times, critic Kevin Thomas offered praise for Cheang's direction and Hagedorn's writing, noting that the film's "interaction of a deteriorating environment, burgeoning cyberspace and mounting urban paranoia [...] create a vividly contemporary background" for a "gentle lesbian love story." The Quad Cinema, where the film had its U.S. premiere, called Fresh Kill "an underseen radical feminist gem" and favorably compared it to Brazil and Born in Flames. Conversely, Janet Maslin of The New York Times offered praise for the film's soundtrack but described Fresh Kill as "aimless, arty self-indulgence carried to a remarkable extreme," while Nathan Rabin of The A.V. Club surmised that the film was a "typically Godardian pastiche of formal experimentation" that was thin in plot, lacking sympathetic characters and "too confused and disjointed to be anything but a well-intentioned, intermittently interesting failure."

The film is noted for its themes of solidarity by marginalized groups against racism and sexism; its condemnation of transnational capitalism; and its depiction of how "resistance circulates through networks originally designed to facilitate the exchange of labor, commodities, and capital." In her analysis of Fresh Kill, Gina Marchetti notes how the film depicts "the emancipatory potential of the digital," offering "hope for seizing the means of communication by reflecting on its own production and providing an image of radical media empowerment to inspire others." The film is noted for its influence on hacker subculture, with a 1995 article about the film for the now-defunct hacker publication InfoNation containing one of the first uses of the term "hacktivism".

== Home media ==
The film was released on Blu-ray by the Criterion Collection on May 19, 2026.
