= Paulita Pappel =

Spanish filmmaker and businessperson

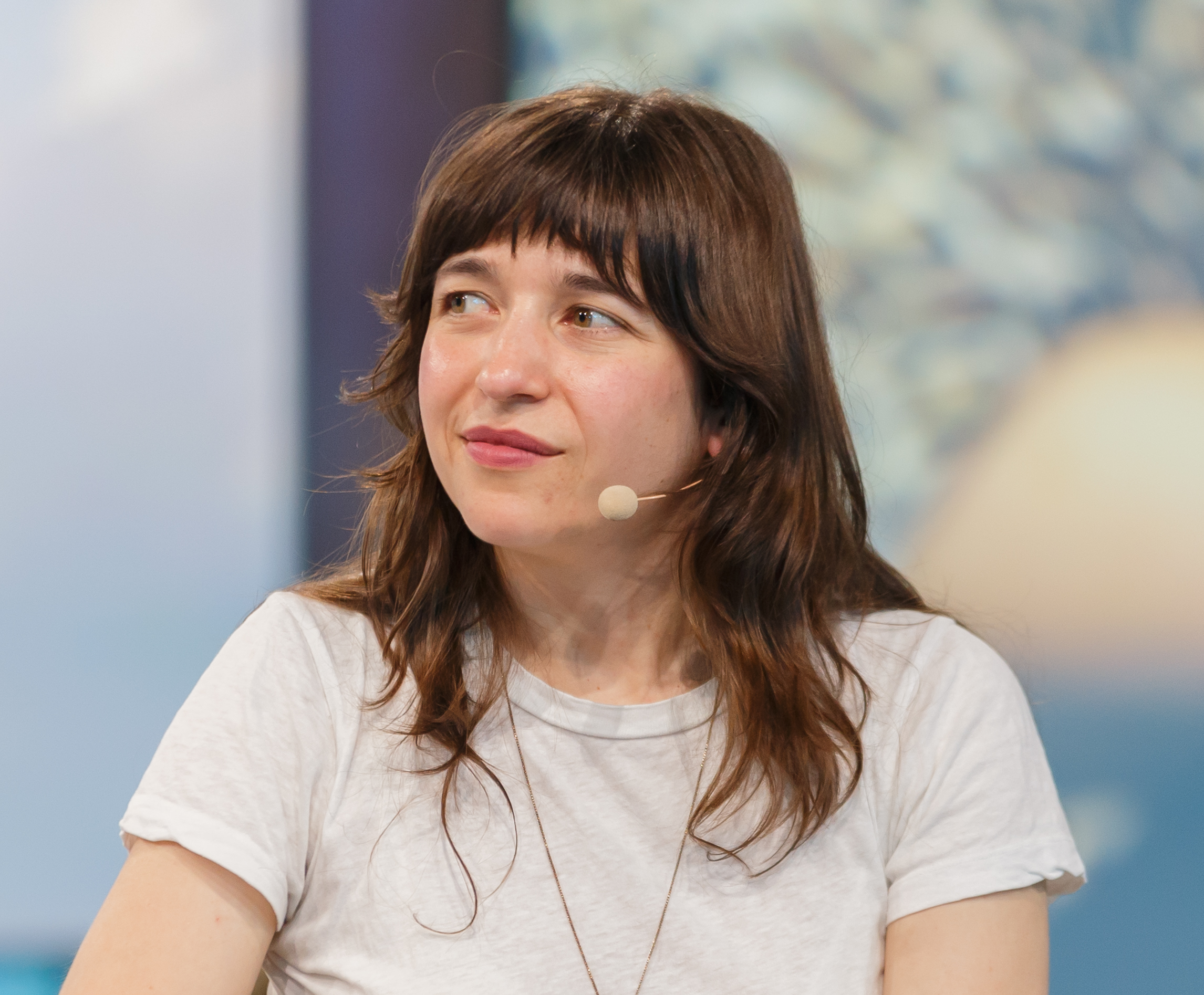
- Pappel in 2022
- Born: 1986 or 1987 (age 39–40); Madrid, Spain
- Citizenship: German
- Education: Free University of Berlin
- Occupations: Pornstar; Filmmaker; Screenwriter; Intimacy coordinator
- Years active: 2013–present
- Website: www.paulitapappel.com

Paulita Pappel (born 1986 or 1987) is a Spanish pornographic actress, filmmaker, screenwriter, and intimacy coordinator based in Berlin, Germany. She is the founder of Lustery, an amateur pornographic site, and Hardwerk, an independent pornographic production company based in Germany. She is also the curator of the Pornfilmfestival Berlin.

== Early life and education ==
Pappel was born in Madrid, Spain. She was raised a feminist and became fascinated by pornography early in her life. In 2005, Pappel completed her school and moved to Germany. Pappel attended the Free University of Berlin where she studied comparative literature and received her Bachelor's degree in 2013.

== Career ==
During her time at FU Berlin, Pappel discovered sex-positive queer feminism and engaged herself in the Berlin queer feminist community. Her political convictions led her to challenge societal taboos and stigmas regarding sexuality and she started performing in queer feminist pornographic films as an activist act. Pappel worked in several queer feminist productions such as Share (2010) by Marit Östberg and Mommy Is Coming (2012) by Cheryl Dunye. She also appeared in several films of the Erika Lust-founded series XConfessions.

From 2015, Pappel started to work as a producer and director for multiple productions. She is also involved in Berlin's feminist queer porn community and considered an icon of alt porn culture. She advocates for a sex-positive, consent culture. Pappel also co-organizes and curates the Pornfilmfestival Berlin. In 2016, Pappel founded Lustery.com, a platform dedicated to the sex lives of real-life couples from around the world who film and share their sex lives with the community. In 2020, Pappel founded HARDWERK, a production company as well as hardwerk.com, a sex-positive feminism platform with an extensive library of pornographic videos.

== Selected filmography ==
=== Actress ===
As an actress
Year	Title	Director
2010	Share	Marit Östberg
2012	Hasenhimmel	Oliver Rihs
2012	Mommy Is Coming	Cheryl Dunye
2013	Space Labia	Lo-Fi Cherry
2014	XConfessions Vol. 3	Erika Lust
2014	Magic Rosebud	Roberta Pinson/Lavian Rose
2014	Performance	Hanna Bergfors/Kornelia Kugler
2015	When we are together we can be everywhere	Marit Östberg
2016	XConfessions Vol. 6	Erika Lust
2018	XConfessions Vol. 12	Poppy Sanchez
2019	Instinct	Marit Östberg
2019	Eva Sola	Lara Rodriguez Cruz
2019	The Intern – A Summer of Lust	Erika Lust

=== Director / Producer ===
As a director and producer
Year	Title
2016	Female Ejaculation
2016	Birthday Surprise
2016	The Tinder Sex Experiment
2016	Lustery
2017	Refugees Welcome
2017	Meanwhile in a parallel universe
2017	The Toilet Line
2018	It Is Not The Pornographer Who Is Perverse..
2019	Bride Gang
2019	Gang Car Gang
2019	Ask me Bang
2020	Labyrinth Gang
2020	Kill Gang
2020	Hey Siro
2020	Hirsute
2020	Masquerade of Madness
2021	Even Closer / Hautnah
2021	Ask me Bang Delfine
2021	Hologang
2022	FFMM straight/queer doggy BJ ORAL orgasm squirting ROYALE (gebührenfinanziert)
