= HIV/AIDS in Japan =

Human immunodeficiency virus (HIV) first came to attention in the 1980s in the United States, followed by global interest in the years that followed. Among the many countries affected, Japan's population of affected people remains low in comparison to other developed countries such as the United States and European countries. The number of cases continues to rise. Official reports indicate that 6 homosexual men were diagnosed in 1985, which grew to 100 people infected by 1990.

The primary group affected in the 1980s was hemophiliacs, but that shifted to sexual transmission in the late 1980s and early 1990s. Due to poor media coverage and the lack of momentum from activist groups, large misconceptions about the disease, homosexuals, and foreigners spread about the general population.

Today, Japan remains one of the top providers of funds for global efforts such as the Global Fund to Fight AIDS, Tuberculosis, and Malaria and World Health Organization for HIV/AIDS prevention and treatment.

== Epidemiology ==
In April 2016, sexual contact was the primary mode of HIV/AIDS transmission. In homosexuals, it accounted for 57.3% of all HIV cases and 38.7% of AIDS cases. Heterosexual transmission is responsible for 27.2% of HIV infections and 35.7% of AIDS infections. The age distribution is mostly people in their twenties and thirties and are more likely to be in an urban setting than a rural one, and infected people are mostly male (15,567 males; 2,342 females diagnosed with HIV from 1985 to 2015). One study found a positive correlation between population density and the number of HIV/AIDS cases in the given area. They proposed that the increased number of people in an area of space increases the chance of possible encounters with an infected person as well as increased the general mobility of the disease.

People were reluctant to get help during the offset of the disease due to the country's conservatism in dealing with issues surrounding sexual orientation. This delay and apprehension to get treatment lead to a greater population being diagnosed with AIDS. In 2015, 30% of the HIV/AIDS diagnoses were made once the virus had already progressed to AIDS.

Initially, the disease was seen in hemophiliacs receiving it from tainted blood supply in the early 1980s, however, in the mid 80s to the present, there was increasing prevalence in homosexual and then heterosexual demographics. About 1,500 HIV/AIDS cases arise each year, of this group, homosexual men dominate this group, followed by heterosexual men, heterosexual women, intravenous drug use, and maternal transmission.

=== HIV-tainted blood scandal ===
Japan started HIV/AIDS surveillance in 1984 and the following year, the first homosexual infection was observed. However, in 1982–1985, the disease primarily infected hemophiliacs. About 40% of hemophiliacs were infected by the means of contaminated blood supply.

In 1989, HIV-infected hemophiliacs filed lawsuits against Japan's Ministry of Health, Labour, and Welfare and five pharmaceutical companies. The companies were accused of importing blood products from the United States without heating them with the knowledge that doing so has serious repercussions and risks. This became known as the HIV-tainted blood scandal.

=== Foreigner and homosexual discrimination ===
The first official report of HIV/AIDS was a male artist who lived in America for years and then returned to Japan. The continued trend of homosexual infection and the portrayal in the media of AIDS as a "foreign" disease gave the illusion that native Japanese heterosexuals were at low risk.

Owing to the lower number of cases relative to the rest of the world, the HIV/AIDS crisis seemed distant and unimportant. In a poll conducted in 1987, 68% of Americans deemed HIV/AIDS to be the most urgent health problem facing the country, 39% of the French thought the same, but only 13% of Japanese people thought this to be true. When the severity of the disease increased, much of it was attributed to foreigners due to lack of general information.

Foreigners were fired from their jobs, prevented from entering certain public facilities, and some removed from their apartments.

In 2015, non-Japanese people accounted for 108 (88 male; 20 female) out of 1,006 cases. This indicates that the population of infected people in Japan has shifted since the first emergence of the disease in the country. Homosexual men remain the most affected demographic of people.

== Funding ==
Japan does not rely on global funds to finance their AIDS research and treatment. AIDS spending is a domestic cost. In 2011, they issued US$67.91 million for domestic HIV/AIDS expenditure.

In contributing to HIV/AIDS as a global crisis, Japan has a role in the funding. Japan was a founding country contributing to the Global Fund. In 2016, Japan pledged US$313 million to help the cause. Since its founding, the Global Fund has saved the lives of 20 million people. In 2019, Japan continued to make significant contributions to the Global Fund.
