= Shu Lea Cheang =

Taiwanese-American artist and filmmaker

- 鄭淑麗
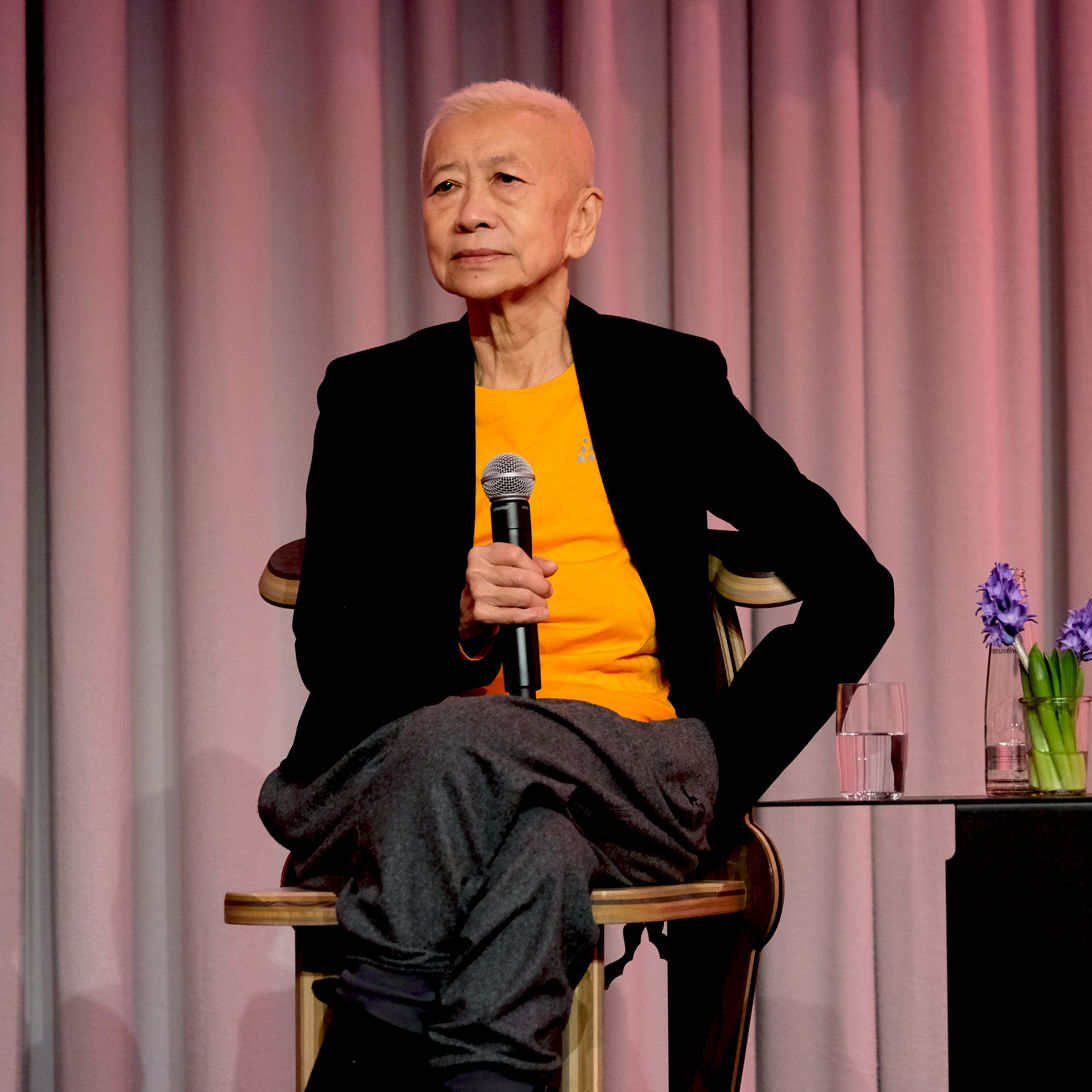
- Cheang in 2025
- Born: April 13, 1954 (age 72); Taiwan
- Education: National Taiwan University (BA); New York University (MA)
- Notable work: Fresh Kill, I.K.U., Brandon
- Style: New media art

Shu Lea Cheang (Chinese: 鄭淑麗; pinyin: Zhèng Shúlì; born April 13, 1954) is a Taiwanese-American artist and filmmaker who lived and worked in New York City in the 1980s and 1990s, until relocating to Europe in 2000. Since the 1980s, as a multimedia and new-media artist, she has navigated topics of ethnic stereotyping, sexual politics, and institutional oppression with her radical experimentations in digital realms.

Over the past decade, she has emerged as a prominent figure in new media art. Cheang is one of the leading multimedia artists dealing with multidisciplinary topics. She is regarded as a pioneering figure in internet-based art, with her multimedia approach at the interface between film, video, internet-based installation, software interaction and durational performance. Her work is often interactive. She is most noted for her individual approach in the realm of art and technology, creatively intermingling social issues with artistic methods.

Cheang's work employs film, video, net-based installation, and interface to explore "...ethnic stereotyping, the nature and excesses of popular media, institutional – and especially governmental – power, race relations, and sexual politics." Cheang has also written and directed the feature films I.K.U. and Fluidø, and directed Fresh Kill.

== Life and career ==
Cheang was born during a time when Taiwan was under martial law in 1954. Cheang received a BA in history from the National Taiwan University in 1976 and an MA in Cinema Studies from New York University in 1979. From Taiwan, Cheang moved to New York in the 1980s. She admitted to feeling liberated after moving, calling it a process of “self-acknowledgment and affirmation.” Her art career seeded and bloomed in New York. Shortly after she moved to New York, she joined the collective Paper Tiger Television and started producing live weekly programs that used public-access channels to reach cable subscribers.

After 20 years in New York, she went on a decade of a self-imposed lifestyle as a digital nomad which she says “liberated me from monthly fixed payments of rent, electricity and phone bills.” She lived in Japan, Holland, the United Kingdom, and finally relocated to Paris in 2007, where she currently works and resides. Cheang concluded her 20 years spent in New York with Brandon (1998–1999), the first Guggenheim Museum web art commission/collection.

Tough social themes such as racial politics help progress her work. She recalls, “When I first got to New York, I was more concerned about certain kinds of racial discrimination or stereotypes of being an Asian woman — there were many different kinds of fantasies about Asian women.”

=== 2019 Venice Biennale ===
Shu Lea Cheang represented Taiwan at the 58th Venice Biennale in 2019. She is the first woman to represent Taiwan with a solo-exhibition. Her site-specific work was installed at the Palazzo delle Prigioni, a former prison across from the Palazzo Ducale in Piazza San Marco. Curated by philosopher Paul B. Preciado, the immersive installation explored pervasive technologies of control, from surveillance to incarceration, drawing from historical and contemporary cases in which people have been imprisoned due to their gender, sexual orientation, or race.

=== The Influencers 2019 ===
In her talk for The Influencers 2019, "Genre Bending Gender Fxxxking", Cheang reflects on her eventful trajectory mixing, messing genres and genders in her multi-disciplinary art practices, from BRANDON (1998–1999, Guggenheim Museum), 3x3x6 (2019, Venice Biennale) to her current projects in process, UNBORN0x9 and UKI, an interruptive cinema.

== Notable works ==
Color Schemes, is an interactive three-channel video installation exhibited at the Whitney Museum of American Art in 1990. The video features people of different ethnicities and reveals the complex attitudes surrounding ethnic stereotyping embedded in American Culture.

In 1994, Cheang directed the film Fresh Kill. The title refers to a garbage dump in Staten Island. The film "envisions a post-apocalyptic landscape strewn with electronic detritus and suffering the toxic repercussions of mass marketing in a high-tech commodity culture."

Bowling Alley, commissioned by the Walker Art Center and funded by AT&T New Art/New Visions, was exhibited in 1995. The installation linked the Walker's Gallery 7, the city's community bowling alley (Bryant-Lake Bowl), and the World Wide Web. Bowling Alley mixed real-life with cyberspace to illustrate the similarities and differences of how people communicate with one another face-to-face and through the Internet. Bowling Alley was Cheang's first cybernetic installation. Cheang collaborated with other Minneapolis artists to present a work which set to challenge the idea of what is personal and public, popular art and fine art by intertwining these oppositions.

Another major Web-based project Cheang created was Brandon (1998–1999). The one-year narrative project explored the issues of gender fusion and techno-body in both public space and cyberspace. The site got its name from Brandon Teena, a trans man who was raped and murdered in 1993 after his biological sex was revealed. Brandon was the first Web-based artwork commissioned by The Solomon R. Guggenheim Museum. It explores Brandon Teena's story in an experimental way that conveys the "fluidity and ambiguity of gender and identity in contemporary societies." In addition to the website, Brandon included live public events at the Guggenheim Museum, the De Waag Society for Old and New Media in Amsterdam, and Harvard University.

Over time, as web browsers evolved, Brandon stopped displaying correctly. In 2017, the artwork was digitally restored and made publicly viewable again in a joint initiative by the Guggenheim's conservation department and New York University's department of computer science. Brandon was also featured in Rhizome's Net Art Anthology, an online exhibition of one hundred important net artworks. The project was a major achievement in the conservation of net.born art. Contemporary web browsers could no longer recognize much of the early HTML code used on the site, or support the unique Java applets used to animate its text and images. In December 2016, Conserving Computer-Based Art (CCBA), a joint initiative of the Guggenheim and NYU, obtained approval from Cheang to restore the work.

In 2000, Cheang directed the feature film I.K.U., a pornographic film which she claimed was inspired by Blade Runner. I.K.U. was nominated for an International Fantasy Film Award.

== Recent works ==
Cheang's Locker Baby Project (2001-2012) is a playfield of sonic imagery triggered only by human interaction. Her baby series project proposes a fictional scenario set in year 2030. The transnational DPT (DollyPolly Transgency) advances clone babies as an intelligent industry. The Clone Generation holds the key to unlock the networked inter-sphere of ME-motion (Memory+Emotion).

- Baby Play (2001), the first installment employs a large scale table football field. Opposing rows of 22 ball players are replaced by human sized cloned locker babies. The tracking of ball movement retrieves ME-data (texts and sound) deposited in respective lockers.
- Baby Love (2005), the second installment consists of 6 large size teacups and 6 clone babies. Each teacup is an auto-driving mobile unit with spinning wheels allowing direction maneuver and speed variation. Each baby is a situated mac-mini engine with wifi linked to the net depository of shuffles and remixes of popular love songs.
- Baby Work (2012), the third installment designates the public visiting the gallery to collect and rearrange scattered keys and compose words into collective sonic expression. Active participants are the clone babies who are entrusted to store and retrieve ME-data.

Cheang wrote and directed the 2017 science fiction film Fluidø.

In 2019, Cheang was commissioned by Performa for the Performa 19 biennial. She created her work SLEEP1237 (2019) which was presented as a special program for the Taiwanese Pavilion.

In 2021, she was one of the participants in John Greyson's experimental short documentary film International Dawn Chorus Day.

Cheang directed the film UKI in 2023, a digital collage of game software-generated animation combined with live-action film and visual effects. A sequel to Cheang's 2000 cyberpunk feature I.K.U., the film premiered at the Museum of Modern Art (MoMA) in New York and was commissioned for a solo exhibition at the LAS Art Foundation in Berlin. The production featured sound design and voice acting by Sky Deep.

== Filmography ==
=== Films ===
- 1989 – The Trial of Tilted Arc (Short film; director)
- 1989 – Color Schemes (Short film installation; director)
- 1990 – How History Was Wounded: An Exclusive Report on Taiwanese Media (Short film; director)
- 1993 – Sex Fish (Short film; director)
- 1994 – Sex Bowl (Short film; director)
- 1994 – Fresh Kill (director)
- 1995 – Fingers and Kisses (Short film; director)
- 1995 – Coming Home (Short film; director)
- 2000 – I.K.U. (director, screenwriter)
- 2000 – Love Me 2030 (Short video; director)
- 2017 – Fluidø (director, producer, screenwriter)
- 2017 – Wonders Wander (Series; director, producer, screenwriter)
- 2018 – Fisting Club EP1 (Short film; director, producer)
- 2019 – 3x3x6 (Short film installation; director)
- 2023 – UKI (director, producer, screenwriter)
- 2025 – Fisting Club EP2 (Short film; director)
- 2026 – LOVER LOVE (Short film installation; director)

== Awards and recognition ==
Cheang was the recipient of the 2024 LG Guggenheim Award, an international art prize established as part of a long-term global partnership between LG Group and the Solomon R. Guggenheim Museum to recognize groundbreaking artists in technology-based art.

== See also ==
- List of female film and television directors
- List of LGBT-related films directed by women
- Taiwanese art
