= Mika Katsumura =

Japanese actress (born 1980)

- 勝村 美香
- Born: May 31, 1980 (age 46); Mito, Ibaraki Prefecture, Japan
- Other names: Chise Okuyama (奥山 千世, Okuyama Chise)
- Occupation: Actress
- Years active: 1986–2014
- Spouse: Yūsuke Tomoi (m. 2006; div. 2008)
- Children: 1

Mika Katsumura (勝村 美香, Katsumura Mika; born May 31, 1980, in Mito, Ibaraki Prefecture, Japan) is a former Japanese actress. She played the role of Yuri/Time Pink in the 2000 Super Sentai series Mirai Sentai Timeranger.

== Biography ==
Katsumura started stage activities at a local in Tokyo after graduating as a junior in high school. In 1997, in the stage name Chise Okuyama (奥山 千世, Okuyama Chise), she debuted in the film Bounce Ko Gals. After half a year, Katsumura returned to her hometown, and then returned with her current name, working as an actress. She appeared in the Super Sentai series Mirai Sentai Timeranger and the variety show Men B.

In 2001, Katsumura participated in the self-produced film Enji-ya, which was published in the year. She was co-starred with Timeranger actors Masahiro Kuranuki and Shinji Kasahara.

On January 17, 2006, Katsumura married actor Yūsuke Tomoi; the same year on August 7, she gave birth to a girl. She had a maternity leave after her marriage announcement on March 31, 2007; she quit her agency Versatile Entertainment to focus on her child care.

In May 2007, Katsumura started her own blog, not only to reflect on her daughter but also to show her willingness to her entertainment activities.

In October 2008, she resumed performing acting activities while belonging to her new agency, Asterisk.

On an unknown date in 2014, she left Asterisk and retired from the entertainment industry once again. Her blog was shut down in 2020.

As of February 2026, her current status remains unknown as information about her whereabouts are not available.

== Filmography ==
=== TV series ===
Year	Title	Role	Network	Other notes
1986	Jikuu Senshi Spielban	Diana (child)	TV Asahi	ep. 1 - 2
2000	Mirai Sentai Timeranger	Yuri/Time Pink	TV Asahi	Lead Role
2003	Kamen Rider 555	Chie Morishita	TV Asahi	Episodes 1 - 3

=== Films ===
Year	Title	Role	Other notes
1997	Bounce Ko Gals		
2000	Mirai Sentai Timeranger vs. GoGoFive	Yuri/Time Pink	
2001 - 2003	Enji-ya	Haruka Akiyoshi	
2002	Ultra Seven 35th Anniversary: EVOLUTION	Yuki Kisaragi	
2003	Heat	Shinko Park	
