= Kazuhiro Fujita =

Japanese manga artist (born 1964)

Kazuhiro Fujita 藤田 和日郎
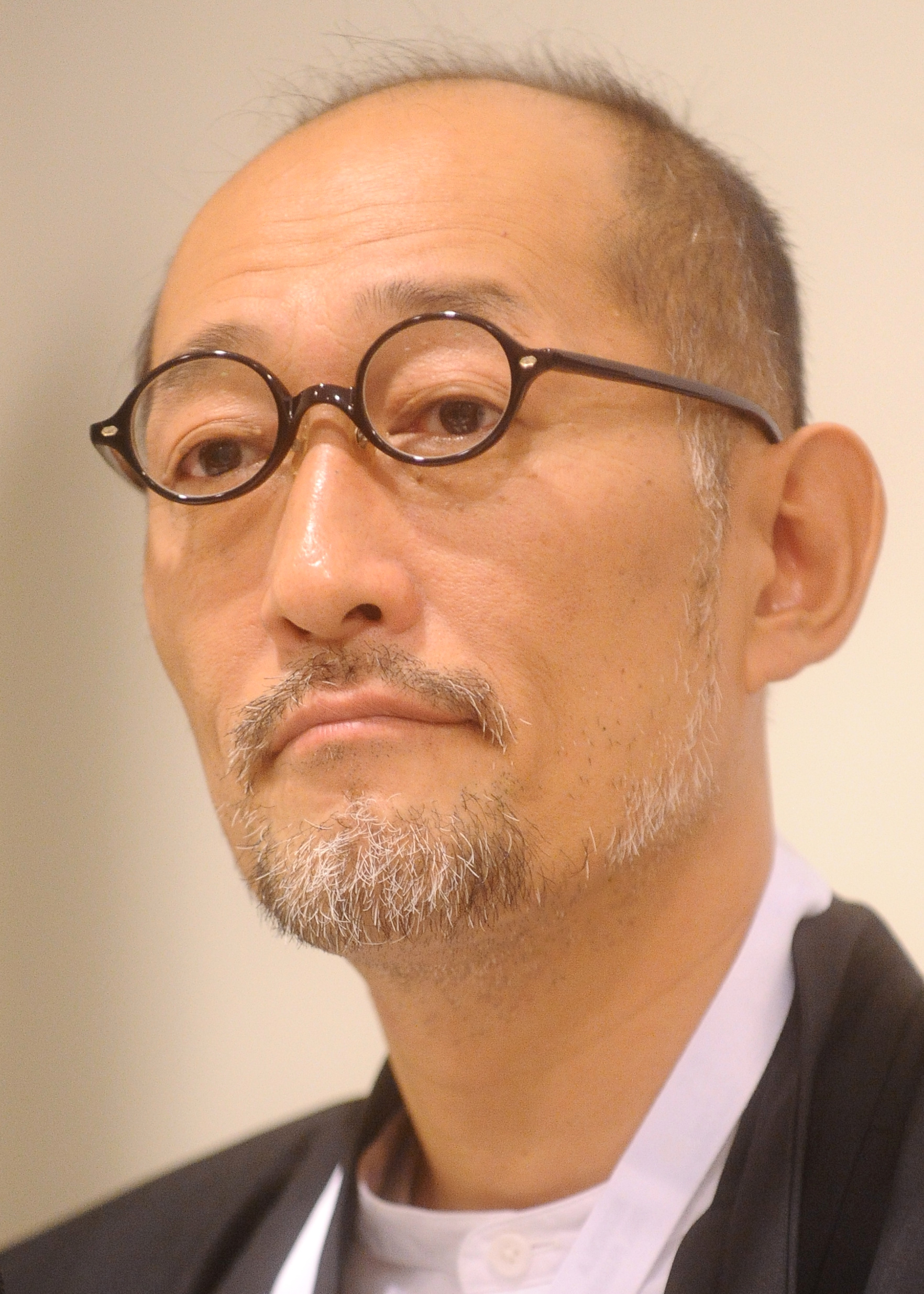
- Kazuhiro Fujita at Lucca Comics & Games 2016
- Born: May 24, 1964 (age 62) Asahikawa, Hokkaidō, Japan
- Area: Manga artist
- Notable works: Ushio & Tora, Karakuri Circus, Moonlight Act, Sōbōtei Kowasubeshi
- Awards: Shogakukan Newcomer Comic Award (1988); Shōnen Sunday Comic Grand Prix (1989); Shogakukan Manga Award (1992); Seiun Award (1997)

Kazuhiro Fujita (藤田 和日郎, Fujita Kazuhiro; born May 24, 1964, in Asahikawa, Hokkaidō, Japan) is a Japanese manga artist. He graduated from Nihon University. Fujita made his professional manga debut in Weekly Shōnen Sunday in 1989. He is known for his manga series Ushio & Tora and Karakuri Circus. For Ushio & Tora, Fujita won the Shogakukan Manga Award in the shōnen category in 1992 and the Seiun Award in 1997.

== Influences ==
Fujita stated that he wanted to become a manga artist after reading Rumiko Takahashi's "When My Eyes Got Wings" (闇をかけるまなざし, Yami wo Kakeru Manazashi). He also named Yōsuke Takahashi, Satoshi Yoshida and Daijiro Morohoshi as influences.

== Works ==
- Ushio & Tora (うしおととら, Ushio to Tora), 1990–1996, 33 volumes, Shogakukan's Weekly Shōnen Sunday
- Yoru no Uta (夜の歌), 1995 (collection of short stories published in Weekly Shōnen Sunday and Shōnen Sunday Zōkan from 1988 to 1994)
- Karakuri Circus (からくりサーカス, Karakuri Sākasu) 1997–2006, 43 volumes, Shogakukan's Weekly Shōnen Sunday
- Akatsuki no Uta (暁の歌), 2004 (collection of short stories published in Weekly Shōnen Sunday and Weekly Young Sunday from 1996 to 2003)
- Jagan wa Gachirin ni Tobu (邪眼は月輪に飛ぶ), 2006–2007, one volume, Shogakukan's Big Comic Spirits
- The Black Museum: Springald (黒博物館 スプリンガルド, Kuro Hakubutsukan Supuringarudo), 2007, one volume, Kodansha's Morning
- Moonlight Act (月光条例, Gekkō Jōrei), 2008–2014, 29 volumes, Shogakukan's Weekly Shōnen Sunday
- The Black Museum: Ghost and Lady (黒博物館 ゴースト アンド レデ, Kuro Hakubutsukan Gōsuto ando Redi), 2014–2015, 2 volumes, Kodansha's Morning
- Sōbōtei Kowasubeshi (双亡亭壊すべし), 2016–2021, 25 volumes, Shogakukan's Weekly Shōnen Sunday
- The Black Museum: Mikazuki Yo, Kaibutsu to Odore (黒博物館 三日月よ、怪物と踊れ, Kuro Hakubutsukan Mikazuki Yo, Kaibutsu to Odore), 2022–2023, 6 volumes, Kodansha's Morning
- Silver Mountain (シルバーマウンテン, Shirubā Maunten), 2025–present, Shogakukan's Weekly Shōnen Sunday

== Other ==
- Ayakashidō no Hōrai (あやかし堂のホウライ), 2004–2006, original concept, 3 volumes, Shogakukan's Shōnen Sunday Super
- BakéGyamon (妖逆門, Bakegyamon), 2006–2007, original concept, 5 volumes, Shogakukan's Weekly Shōnen Sunday

== Anime adaptations ==
- Ushio & Tora, 1992–1993 10-episode OVA
- Ushio & Tora: Comically Deformed Theater, 1993 one-episode parody OVA
- Karakuri Circus, 1998 Weekly Shōnen Sunday commercial
- Puppet Princess, 2000 one-episode OVA adapting a short story published in Yoru no Uta
- Ushio & Tora, 2015–2016 anime television series
- Karakuri Circus, 2018–2019 anime television series

== Master ==
- Yoshitoh Asari (Space Family Carlvinson)

== Assistants ==
- Nobuyuki Anzai
- Kazurou Inoue
- Yukio Katayama (Hanamote Katare, Furo Girl!, Yoake no Ryodan)
- Tatsuya Kaneda (Ayakashidō no Hōrai)
- Makoto Raiku
- Hiroshi Fukuda (Mushibugyō, 5-fungo no Sekai, Rock Is a Lady's Modesty)
