= List of Karakuri Circus volumes =

Karakuri Circus is a Japanese manga series written and illustrated by Kazuhiro Fujita. It was serialized in Shogakukan's Weekly Shōnen Sunday from July 23, 1997, to June 14, 2006. It spanned 425 chapters, which were collected in 43 tankōbon volumes, with the first volume being released on December 10, 1997, and the last one on August 11, 2006. The manga has been reprinted and collected in multiple editions; "My first wide" edition (collected into 16 volumes, released from November 2008 to February 2010), wide-ban edition (collected into 23 volumes, released from July 2011 to April 2013), bunkoban edition (collected into 22 volumes, released from May 2017 to February 2019), and kanzenban edition (collected into 26 volumes, released from September 2018 to September 2019).

== Volumes ==
No.	Release date	ISBN
01	December 10, 1997	4-09-125331-8
02	February 18, 1998	4-09-125332-6
03	April 18, 1998	4-09-125333-4
04	August 8, 1998	4-09-125334-2
05	October 17, 1998	4-09-125335-0
06	January 18, 1999	4-09-125336-9
07	March 18, 1999	4-09-125337-7
08	May 18, 1999	4-09-125338-5
09	August 7, 1999	4-09-125339-3
10	November 18, 1999	4-09-125340-7
11	January 18, 2000	4-09-125681-3
12	April 18, 2000	4-09-125682-1
13	June 17, 2000	4-09-125683-X
14	August 9, 2000	4-09-125684-8
15	November 18, 2000	4-09-125685-6
16	January 18, 2001	4-09-125686-4
17	April 18, 2001	4-09-125687-2
18	June 18, 2001	4-09-125688-0
19	September 18, 2001	4-09-125689-9
20	November 17, 2001	4-09-125690-2
21	January 18, 2002	4-09-126361-5
22	April 18, 2002	4-09-126362-3
23	June 18, 2002	4-09-126363-1
24	August 9, 2002	4-09-126364-X
25	October 18, 2002	4-09-126365-8
26	January 18, 2003	4-09-126366-6
27	March 18, 2003	4-09-126367-4
28	June 18, 2003	4-09-126368-2
29	September 18, 2003	4-09-126369-0
30	November 18, 2003	4-09-126370-4
31	February 18, 2004	4-09-127071-9
32	May 18, 2004	4-09-127072-7
33	July 16, 2004	4-09-127073-5
34	October 18, 2004	4-09-127074-3
35	December 17, 2004	4-09-127075-1
36	February 18, 2005	4-09-127076-X
37	May 18, 2005	4-09-127077-8
38	July 15, 2005	4-09-127078-6
39	October 18, 2005	4-09-127079-4
40	December 15, 2005	4-09-127080-8
41	February 17, 2006	4-09-120109-1
42	May 18, 2006	4-09-120379-5
43	August 11, 2006	4-09-120570-4
