= Black Museum (disambiguation) =

Black Museum may refer to:

- the Black Museum at New Scotland Yard, now known as the Crime Museum
- Black Museum (Southwark), a museum of engineering components gathered by David Kirkaldy
- Black Museum (Black Mirror), an episode of Black Mirror
- The Black Museum (radio series), radio show hosted by Orson Welles
- The Black Museum (manga), a Japanese manga series anthology by Kazuhiro Fujita
- Category:African-American museums, museums focused on African Americans
