= Takeshi Aono =

Japanese actor (1936–2012)

- 青野 武
- Born: June 19, 1936; Asahikawa, Hokkaidō, Japan
- Died: April 9, 2012 (aged 75); Hachiōji, Tokyo, Japan
- Occupations: Voice Actor; narrator
- Years active: 1954–2010
- Agent: Aoni Production
- Height: 169 cm (5 ft 7 in)

Takeshi Aono (青野 武, Aono Takeshi; June 19, 1936 – April 9, 2012) was a Japanese voice actor and narrator from Asahikawa, Hokkaidō. He was attached to Aoni Production at the time of his death. He graduated from Hokkaidō Asahikawa Higashi High School.

== Career ==
Aono was most known for the roles of Shiro Sanada (Space Battleship Yamato), Rihaku (Fist of the North Star), Nurarihyon (GeGeGe no Kitaro), Piccolo Daimao and Kami-sama (Dragon Ball), Kumahachi Kumada (Kiteretsu Daihyakka), Dakuan (Ninja Scroll), Gen Fu (Dead or Alive), Dezsaras (Transformers: Victory), Jinpachi Mishima (Demon form) (Tekken 5/Tekken 5: Dark Resurrection) and Tomozō Sakura (Chibi Maruko-chan). In the live action field, Aono was the official dubbing artist of Joe Pesci and Christopher Lloyd. Aono was also known to appear in the first ten One Piece films. He is also known to gamers as the voice of Dr. Wily in the PlayStation-era Mega Man games, and Colonel Roy Campbell in the Metal Gear franchise. Aono is mostly remembered for his harsh voice for many Japanese anime series.

== Illness and death ==
In May 2010, Aono checked into a hospital for an aortic dissection and suffered a stroke shortly thereafter, thus ending his career as a voice actor. His ongoing roles were replaced by other voice actors.

At about 4:38 pm on April 9, 2012, Aono suffered a bout of post-operative multiple cerebral infarctions and was found dead. Voice actress Eiko Hisamura announced Aono's death via her Twitter feed, and video game designer Hideo Kojima stated via his Twitter that he would retire the Roy Campbell character from the Metal Gear series out of respect for Aono. Aono was 75 years old at the time of his death.

== Voice roles ==
=== Anime television series ===
1965

- Super Jetter (Alien X)

1968

- Sabu to Ichi Torimono Hikae (Shonosuke, Miyoshi)
- Yūyake Banchō

1970

- Bakuhatsu Gorō (Kudo)

1971

- Animentarie Ketsudan

1972

- Devilman (Faizel)

1973

- Science Ninja Team Gatchaman (Masaki, Commander (ep. 12))
- Karate Baka Ichidai (Kuroki)

1974

- Hurricane Polymar (Joe Kuruma)
- Space Battleship Yamato (Shiro Sanada, Mori's Father, Berger, Talan (first voice))

1975

- Arabian Nights: Sinbad's Adventures (Blue Genie)

1976

- Ganso Tensai Bakabon (Various)

1977

- Lupin III (Peter Jacov, Gregoire III)
- Angie Girl (Roger)

1978

- Nobody's Boy: Remi (Jerome Barberin)
- Space Battleship Yamato 2 (Shiro Sanada)
- Uchū Majin Daikengo (Roboleon)
- Invincible Steel Man Daitarn 3 (Soldier Matsu)
- Yatterman (Yonkyo)

1979

- Space Battleship Yamato: The New Voyage (Shiro Sanada)
- Entaku no Kishi Monogatari: Moero Arthur (Hesting)
- Bannertail: The Story of Gray Squirrel (Akacho)
- Mirai Robo Daltanius (Danji's Father)

1980

- Space Battleship Yamato III (Shiro Sanada)
- Uchū Senshi Baldios (Zeo Gattler)
- Galaxy Express 999 (Commanding Officer (ep. 97))
- Nils no Fushigi na Tabi (Wind Rush)

1981

- Urusei Yatsura (Personal Computer, Super Delicious Planet Golden Special Reserve Gorgeous After-Care Kid No. 28, Kitsune's teacher)
- Dash Kappei (Captain Gokō)
- Mighty Atom (Ketchup (ep. 16), Professor Amanokawa (ep. 41))
- Six God Combination Godmars (Professor Myojin)

1982

- Scientific Rescue Team TechnoVoyager (Gran Hansen)
- Gyakuten! Ippatsuman (Salesman Nakashima (ep. 19))
- The Mysterious Cities of Gold (Sancho)
- Patalliro! (Head Guard)

1983

- Ai Shite Night (Shigemaru Mitamura)
- Ginga Shippū Sasuraiger (Bill, Vincent Sho)
- Manga Nihon Shi (Shiba Yoshiyuki, Ashikaga Yoshimasa, Oda Nobunaga)

1984

- Fist of the North Star (Rihaku of the Ocean)
- Yume Senshi Wingman (Principal)
- Lupin III (Garve, Tony Luccino, others)

1985

- GeGeGe no Kitaro (Nurarihyon, Unisuke, Fukurosage, Neko-sen'nin, Binbōgami, Gama-sen'nin, Ito-sen'nin, Old Man, Narration)
- Ninja Senshi Tobikage (Hazard Pasha)

1986

- Ultraman Kids no Kotowaza Monogatari (Grosser-sensei)
- Ginga: Nagareboshi Gin (Benizakura)
- Dragon Ball (Ninja Murasaki, Ginkaku, King Piccolo, and Kami)
- High School! Kimengumi (Seiretsu Zenin)

1987

- Fist of the North Star 2 (Rihaku of the Sea)
- Tsuide ni Tonchinkan (Chief Doku'oni)
- Bikkuriman (Super Devil)

1988

- Oishinbo (Kairakutei Black)
- Kiteretsu Daihyakka (Kumahachi Kumada, Yaohachi's Father, Mōretsu Sai, Kumaichiro)
- Hello! Lady Lynn (Reynolds)

1989

- Kariage-kun (Man at Tanabe Station, Chief, Director)
- Jungle Emperor (Raulo (ep. 8))
- Soreike! Anpanman (Hanabiman (first voice), Baron Horagai, Donutsman (second voice), Tongarashi (second voice))
- Transformers: Victory (Deszaras)
- Chinpui (Debra Moo)
- Dragon Quest: Yusha Abel Densetsu (General Ludoff)
- Dragon Ball Z (Kami and King Piccolo)
- New Bikkuriman (Super Devil)
- Ranma ½ (Gambling King and Kinnii)

1990

- NG Knight Lamune & 40 (Dr. White (ep. 9))
- Tanoshii Moomin Ikka (Pirate)
- Magical Taruruto-kun (Matsugoro Naniwa)
- The Three-Eyed One (Goblin)
- Mōretsu Atarō (Servant)

1991

- City Hunter '91 (Phantom Killer (ep. 5~6))
- Tanoshii Moomin Ikka Adventure Diary (Commander)
- Dragon Quest: Dai no Daibōken (Hadlar, Mazohho)
- The Laughing Salesman (Yosuke Uchinaki (ep. 73))

1992

- O~i! Ryoma (Hachihira Sakamoto)
- Crayon Shin-chan (Black Meke-Meke, President Gilgiros, Narration, etc.)
- Super Jigan (Ozawa, Narration)
- Tetsujin 28 FX (Dr. Frankenstein, Count of Transylvania)
- Hime-chan's Ribbon (Kumosuke)
- Tenchi Muyo! (Katsuhito Masaki and Nobuyuki Masaki)

1993

- Legend of the Swordmaster Yaiba (Matsuo Bashō)
- Ghost Sweeper Mikami (Kenki-kun)
- Battle Tycoon: Flash Hiders SFX (Guston Slayed)
- Battle Spirits: Ryuko no Ken (Ryuhaku Todo)

1994

- Mobile Fighter G Gundam (Birdman)
- Samurai Spirits (Hattori Hanzō)
- Tenchi Muyo! II (Katsuhito Masaki and Nobuyuki Masaki)
- Tenchi Muyo! The Night Before Christmas (Katsuhito Masaki)

1995

- Gulliver Boy (Papa Toscani, Majin)
- Neighborhood Story (Houshi)
- Chibi Maruko-chan (Tomozō "Ojii-chan" Sakura (2nd voice))
- Tenchi Muyo! (Katsuhito Masaki and Nobuyuki Masaki)
- Tenchi Universe (Katsuhito Masaki and Nobuyuki Masaki)

1996

- Kaiketsu Zorro (Timoteo)
- GeGeGe no Kitarō (Cannibal Island, Toshitaro Ijuuin, Butler, Bakeneko, Matsuzo Mitaka, Harunosuke Nagasaki, Kamanari, Professor)
- Hell Teacher Nube (Kageguchi, Yama Oroshi)
- You're Under Arrest (Daimaru Nakajima)
- Chōja Raideen (Hidora)
- Nintama Rantarō (Mizuta)
- Tsuyoshi Shikkari Shinasai (Tozo)
- Detective Conan (Norikazu Sasai and Nicodimus Stanley)
- Magical Girl Pretty Sammy (Genjuro Hagakure and Nobuyuki Onijigoku)
- Fire Emblem (Gharnef)
- Slayers Special (Diol)

1997

- Kindaichi Case Files (Eisaku Iwata)
- Dr. Slump (Ankoromochi)
- Haunted Junction (Board Chairman)
- Tenchi in Tokyo (Katsuhito Masaki and Nobuyuki Masaki)

1998

- Shikuu Tenshou Nazca (Yukinojo Miura)
- Outlaw Star (Gwen Khan and Swanzo)
- Sentimental Journey (Narration (ep. 10))
- Bomberman B-Daman Bakugaiden (Wa Lion)
- Master Keaton (Chin Haku Shu)
- Yu-Gi-Oh! (Sugoroku Muto)
- Cowboy Bebop (Doohan)
- Trigun (Stan)
- Ojarumaru (Emperor Menma)

1999

- Kyorochan (Kyoro Jii-san)
- The Big O (Dandy Wise)

2000

- Inuyasha (Kaijinbō)
- Kindaichi Case Files (Fujio Tashiro, Nobuhiro Yamanouchi)
- Legendary Gambler Tetsuya (Narration)
- Nintama Rantarō (Crying Man)
- Mushrambo (Lanancuras)
- One Piece ("Hawk Eye" Mihawk, Woop Slap (2nd voice))

2001

- Shaman King (Yohmei Asakura)
- Najica Blitz Tactics (Second Hand Maker and Old Man)
- Great Dangaioh (Commander Yonamine)
- Vampiyan Kids (Shinigami Judge)
- Detective Conan (Muneyuki Mino)

2002

- Magical Shopping Arcade Abenobashi (Grandpa Masa)
- Tenchi Muyo! GXP (Katsuhito Masaki)
- Naruto (Tazuna)
- Panyo Panyo Di Gi Charat (Santa Claus)

2003

- Agatha Christie's Great Detectives Poirot and Marple (Clancy)
- Astro Boy: Mighty Atom (Mini Mini)
- Natsuhiko Kyogoku's Requiem from the Darkness (Chihei)
- The Galaxy Railways (Whitman)
- D.N.Angel (Daiki Niwa)
- Firestorm (Jack Morgan)
- Full Metal Panic! Fumoffu (Yoshiharu Ohnuki)
- Bobobo-bo Bo-bobo (Old Master Somen, Master Tuna Fillet and Ramen Master)

2004

- Aqua Kids (Professor Bill)
- Ojarumaru (Menma-Daiō)
- Girls Bravo: first season (Sakanahara)
- Zoids Fuzors (Professor Peers)
- Black Jack (Togakushi-sensei, Chugoro)
- Yu-Gi-Oh! Duel Monsters GX (Dr. Zweinstein)
- Yakitate!! Japan (Norihei Miki)
- Monkey Turn V (Takeo Douguchi)
- Monster (Haitomaiya)
- Lupin III: Stolen Lupin (Brian Murphy)

2005

- Immortal Grand Prix (Ichi)
- Fighting Beauty Wulong (Mao Fun)
- Gallery Fake (Tappei Shimoda)
- Eureka Seven (Axel Thurston)
- Mushiking: King of the Beetles (Jiji)
- Shinshaku Sanada Jūyūshi (Honda Tadakatsu)
- Basilisk (Azuki Rousai)
- Honey and Clover (Leader)
- Mushishi (Uro Mamoru)
- Pani Poni Dash! (Bicycle Man (Ep. 8))
- Rockman.EXE Beast (Mitsuhasa)

2006

- Kirarin Revolution (Hiwatari Family butler)
- Gin Tama (Hiraga Gengai)
- The Melancholy of Haruhi Suzumiya (Manager)
- The Familiar of Zero (Old Osman)
- D.Gray-man (Bookman)
- Happy Lucky Bikkuriman (Usagi (Super Devil))
- Pumpkin Scissors (Old man)

2007

- El Cazador de la Bruja (Lopez)
- Clannad (Toshio Kōumura)
- GeGeGe no Kitaro (Nurarihyon)
- The Familiar of Zero: Knight of the Twin Moons (Old Osman)
- Mononoke: "Nue" (Robo Osawa)

2008

- Clannad: After Story (Toshio Kōumura)
- The Familiar of Zero: Dance of the Three Princess (Old Osman)
- Natsume's Book of Friends (Tsuyukami)
- Negi Bōzu no Asatarō (Kichibei)
- Himitsu: The Revelation (Shbeltz)
- Someday's Dreamers (Tsuneyoshi Sato)
- Sands of Destruction (Zou and Dr. Elephant)
- Golgo 13 (Kickarse)

2009

- Kaidan Restaurant (Elder Shinigami)
- Kawa no Hikari (Old Rat)
- Tokyo Magnitude 8.0 (Masashi Furuichi)
- Dragon Ball Kai (Kami, Demon and King Piccolo (ep.25))
- P☆STAR (Tomejii)

2010

- NHK Hi-def presents Kitaro: The Happy Journey ~The 100 Years Later Tōno Monogatari~ (Medama Oyaji)
- Kaidan Restaurant (Priest)
- Marie & Gali 2.0 (da Vinci)

=== OVAs ===
- Ushio and Tora (Shigure Aozuki)
- Kamen Rider SD (General Zark)
- Karakuri no Kimi (Shinobi Leader)
- Kyūkyoku Chōjin R (Nariyuki Narihara)
- Kyō Kara Ore Wa!! (Akasaka)
- Legend of the Galactic Heroes (Lieutenant Murai)
- GeGeGe no Kitaro (Nurarihyon)
- Cyber City Oedo 808 (Dave Kurokawa)
- Giant Robo (Doujin Issei)
- JoJo's Bizarre Adventure (Vanilla Ice)
- New Cutey Honey (Professor Kabuto)
- Slayers Special (Diol)
- Tales of Symphonia (Rodyle)
- Detatoko Princess (Old man)
- Birdy the Mighty (Yamazaki)
- Devilman (Jinmen)
- Dragon Ball Z: Gather Together! Goku's World (King Piccolo)
- Tenchi Muyo! Ryo-Ohki (Katsuhito Masaki, Nobuyuki Masaki)
- Violence Jack Hell Town Arc (Mad Zaurus)
- Fire Emblem (Garnef)
- Dangaioh (Professor Tarsan)
- Metal Gear Solid 2 Bande Dessinee (Roy Campbell)
- Battle Spirits: Ryuuko no Ken (Ryuhaku Todo)
- King of Braves GaoGaiGar Final (Gimlet)
- Ranma ½ SPECIAL (Shinnosuke's Grandfather)
- Record of Lodoss War (Vagnard)
- Demon City Shinjuku (Old Woman)
- Puppet Princess (Head of the Deathless Ninjas)
- Sol Bianca (Batros)
- Prefectural Earth Defense Force (Scope Tsuruzuki)
- Dragon Half (Ruth)

=== Anime movies ===
- Night on the Galactic Railroad (1985) - Wireless operator
- Wicked City (Mr. Shadow)
- Lensman (Thorndyke)
- Psalms of Planets Eureka Seven: Pocket Full of Rainbows (Principal)
- Space Battleship Yamato series (Shiro Sanada)
- Kaiketsu Zorori (Magician)
- Futari wa Pretty Cure Max Heart 2: Yukizora no Tomodachi (Old Master)
- Ganbare!! Tabuchi-kun!! (Yasuda)
- Kinnikuman: Counterattack! The Underground Space Choujin (Hydra King)
- Crayon Shin-chan: Action Kamen vs. Haigre Maō (Skeleton and Zombie)
- Glick no Bōken (Ganba)
- Pokémon: Lucario and the Mystery of Mew (Banks)
- Fist of the North Star (Fox)
- GeGeGe no Kitaro series (Nurarihyon)
- Ghost Sweeper Mikami (Akechi Mitsuhide and Kenki-kun)
- Golgo 13 (Pablo)
- Toki no Tabibito -Time Stranger- (Kitahiko)
- Ninja Scroll (Dakuan)
- Doraemon: Nobita and the Winged Heroes (Beautician)
- Dragon Quest: Dai no Daibōken (Hadora)
- Hashire Melos! (Calippas)
- Vampire Hunter D: Bloodlust (Polk)
- Metropolis (Dr. Ponkotsu)
- YuYu Hakusho (Garuga)
- Six God Combination Godmars (Professor Myojin)
- Barefoot Gen (Eizo)
- Barefoot Gen 2 (Sensei)
- Future War 198X (Bugarin)
- Roujin Z (Roujin C and Third Ache)
- Arcadia of My Youth (Murigson)
- One Piece (Ganzo)
- One Piece: Baron Omatsuri and the Secret Island (Kerojii)
- One Piece: Clockwork Island Adventure (Skunk One)
- One Piece: Chopper's Animal Kingdom (Bald Parrot)
- One Piece: Dead End Adventure (Bartender)
- One Piece: Cursed Sacred Sword (Boo Kong)
- One Piece: The Secret Island of Baron Omatsuri (Kero-Jii)
- One Piece: The Mechanical Giants of Karakuri Castle (Gonzo)
- One Piece: Episode of Alabasta - The Desert Princess and the Pirates (Lassou)
- One Piece: Episode of Chopper+: Bloom in the Winter, Miracle Sakura (Isshi 1)
- One Piece Film: Strong World (Pirate)
- Battle Spirits: Ryuko no Ken (Ryuhaku Todoh)
- Dragon Ball Z (Kami)
- Fist of the North Star 0: The Legend of Kenshiro (Fugen)
- The Professional: Golgo 13 (Pablo)
- Metal Gear Solid: Digital Graphic Novel (Roy Campbell)
- Metal Gear Solid 2: Bande Dessinee (Roy Campbell)
- Redline (Old Man Mole)
- Samurai Spirits: Haten Goma no Sho (Hanzo Hattori)
- Street Fight Alpha: Generations (Old Master)
- Tenchi Muyo! in Love (Katsuhito Masaki and Nobuyuki Masaki)
- Tenchi Muyō! Midsummer's Eve (Katsuhito Masaki and Nobuyuki Masaki)

=== Video games ===
Year	Title	Role	Notes	Source
1996	Tobal No. 1	Oliems		
1998	Dragon Force II	Kansuke		
2003	Tales of Symphonia	Rodyle		
2007	ASH: Archaic Sealed Heat	Bullnequ		

- Puyo Puyo series (Suketoudara)
- Ape Escape 3 (Roy Campbell)
- Black Matrix (John)
- Blood Will Tell (Nine Tailed-Fox)
- Bloody Roar 3 (Kohryu)
- BS Tantei Club: Yuki ni Kieta Kako (Sakuma and Imada)
- Capcom vs. SNK 2: Mark of the Millenium (Ryuhaku Todoh)
- Clannad (Toshio Komura)
- Dead or Alive series
  - Dead or Alive (Gen Fu)
  - Dead or Alive 2 (Gen Fu)
  - Dead or Alive 3 (Gen Fu)
  - Dead or Alive 4 (Gen Fu, Muramasa)
- Dragon Ball: Revenge of King Piccolo (Ninja Murasaki and King Piccolo)
- Dragon Ball Z: Budokai (Kami)
- Dragon Ball Z: Budokai Tenkaichi 3 (King Piccolo)
- Dragon Ball Z: Budokai 3 (Kami)
- Final Fantasy IV (Nintendo DS version) (Cagnazzo and King Giott)
- Heart of Darkness (Japanese dub) (Head Honcho)
- Logos Panic
- Lupin III: Shijo no Zunosen (Saimon Paradox)
- Metal Gear series
  - Metal Gear Solid (Roy Campbell)
  - Metal Gear Solid 2: Sons of Liberty (Colonel)
  - Metal Gear Solid 3: Snake Eater (Aleksandr Leonovitch Granin and Roy Campbell)
  - Metal Gear Solid 4: Guns of the Patriots (Roy Campbell)
  - Metal Gear Solid: Peace Walker (DOD Representative)
- Naruto: Ultimate Ninja (Tazuna)
- Ninja Gaiden
  - Ninja Gaiden (Muramasa)
  - Ninja Gaiden Sigma (Muramasa)
  - Ninja Gaiden: Dragon Sword (Muramasa)
  - Ninja Gaiden II (Muramasa)
  - Ninja Gaiden Σ2 (Muramasa)
- One Piece: Grand Battle (Dracule Mihawk)
- One Piece: Unlimited Adventure (Dracule Mihawk)
- Phantasy Star Portable (Dr. Tomrain)
- Phantasy Star Universe (Dr. Tomrain)
- Rockman series
  - Rockman 8: Metal Heroes (Dr. Wily)
  - Rockman Battle & Chase (Dr. Wily)
  - Super Adventure Rockman (Dr. Wily)
  - Rockman Rockman (Dr. Wily)
- Rockman X series
  - Rockman X4 (Dr. Wily)
  - Rockman X6 (Isoc and Ground Scaravich)
- Super Dragon Ball Z (King Piccolo)
- Super Robot Wars series (Hazard Pasha)
- Street Fighter II drama CDs
  - Street Fighter II: Fukushū no Senshi (Retsu)
  - Street Fighter II: Majin no Shōzō (Retsu)
- Super Smash Bros. series
  - Super Smash Bros. Brawl (Roy Campbell)
  - Super Smash Bros. Ultimate (Roy Campbell)
- Tales of Eternia (Maxwell and Nereid)
- Tekken series
  - Tekken 5 (Jinpachi Mishima)
  - Tekken 5: Dark Resurrection (Jinpachi Mishima)
  - Tekken Tag Tournament 2 (Jinpachi Mishima)
- Valkyria Chronicles II (Laurence Kluivert)

=== Live-action ===
- Ultraman (1966) (Alien Zarab (Ep. 18) (also suit actor))
- Enban Senso Bankid (1976) (Zetrus Captain (Ep. 3))
- Ultraman Dyna (1997) (Mysterious Thief Himala (Ep. 12))
- Mahou Sentai Magiranger (2005) (Hades Beastman King of Hell Kobold Bullrates (Ep. 27 - 31))
- Ultraman Mebius & Ultraman Brothers (2006) (Alien Zarab)
- Ultra Galaxy Mega Monster Battle: Never Ending Odyssey (2009) (Alien Zarab (NRB) (Ep. 8)/Imitation Ultraman (Ep. 8))
- Mega Monster Battle: Ultra Galaxy (2009) (Alien Zarab/Imitation Ultraman)

=== Dubbing roles ===
==== Live-action ====
- Joe Pesci
  - Lethal Weapon 2 (Leo Getz)
  - Home Alone (VHS/DVD Edition/1994 Fuji TV Edition) (Harry Lyme)
  - JFK (David Ferrie)
  - The Super (Louie Kritski)
  - Home Alone 2: Lost in New York (VHS/DVD Edition/1997 Fuji TV Edition) (Harry Lyme)
  - Lethal Weapon 3 (Leo Getz)
  - My Cousin Vinny (Vincent LaGuardia "Vinny" Gambini)
  - The Public Eye (Leon "Bernzy" Bernstein)
  - Jimmy Hollywood (Jimmy Alto/Jericho)
  - Gone Fishin' (Joe Waters)
  - Lethal Weapon 4 (Leo Getz)
- Christopher Lloyd
  - Amazing Stories (Professor B.O. Beanes)
  - Back to the Future (VHS/DVD Edition) (Dr. Emmett "Doc" Brown)
  - Back to the Future Part II (VHS/DVD Edition) (Dr. Emmett "Doc" Brown)
  - Back to the Future Part III (VHS/DVD Edition) (Dr. Emmett "Doc" Brown)
  - The Addams Family (1995 NTV edition) (Uncle Fester / Gordon Craven)
  - Addams Family Values (Uncle Fester Addams)
  - Angels in the Endzone (Al "The Boss" Angel)
  - My Favorite Martian (Uncle Martin/The Martian)
- Danny DeVito
  - The Jewel of the Nile (1989 Fuji TV edition) (Ralph)
  - Ruthless People (Sam Stone)
  - The War of the Roses (1992 Fuji TV edition) (Gavin D'Amato)
  - Look Who's Talking Now (Rocks)
  - Mars Attacks! (2000 TV Tokyo edition) (Rude Gambler)
  - L.A. Confidential (2001 Fuji TV edition) (Sid Hudgens)
  - Deck the Halls (Buddy Hall)
- Harry Dean Stanton
  - Pat Garrett and Billy the Kid (Luke)
  - Alien (1980 Fuji TV edition) (Brett)
  - Private Benjamin (1985 TV Asahi edition) (1st Sergeant Jim Ballard)
  - Red Dawn (1987 TBS edition) (Tom Eckert)
  - The Mighty (Elton "Grim" Pinneman)
- 12 Angry Men (Juror #7 (Jack Warden))
- A.I. Artificial Intelligence (Specialist)
- Adam-12 (Pete Malloy (Martin Milner))
- The Addams Family (Tully Alford (Dan Hedaya))
- Around the World in 80 Days (2008 TV Tokyo edition) (Lord Kelvin (Jim Broadbent))
- Assault on Precinct 13 (1980 TV Tokyo edition) (Napoleon Wilson (Darwin Joston))
- Baby's Day Out (Norby LeBlaw (Joe Pantoliano))
- Battle of the Commandos (1975 NTV edition) (Pvt. Frank Madigan (Bruno Corazzari))
- A Better Tomorrow II (Sung Tse-ho (Ti Lung))
- Blackjack (Thomas (Saul Rubinek))
- Casablanca (2000 TV Tokyo edition) (Captain Louis Renault (Claude Rains))
- Charlotte's Web (Samuel the Sheep (John Cleese))
- Commando (1987 TBS edition) (Bennett (Vernon Wells))
- Congo (Herkermer Homolka (Tim Curry))
- Ewoks: The Battle for Endor (Willy)
- The Da Vinci Code (2009 Fuji TV edition) (Sir Leigh Teabing (Ian McKellen))
- Das Boot (1983 Fuji TV edition) (Obermaschinist Johann (Erwin Leder))
- Death Ship (1983 Fuji TV edition) (Nick (Nick Mancuso))
- Death Wish (1980 TV Asahi edition) (Detective Hank (Jack Wallace))
- Disciples of the 36th Chamber (Manchu Chief (Lau Kar-leung))
- Eastern Condors (Lieutenant Colonel Lam (Lam Ching-ying))
- Ernest P. Worrell series (Ernest P. Worrell)
- Escape from New York (1982 NTV edition) (Snake Plissken (Kurt Russell))
- Fierce Creatures (Adrian 'Bugsy' Malone (Michael Palin))
- Full House (Nick Katsopolis (John Aprea))
- Freddy vs. Jason (2005 TV Tokyo edition) (Freddy Krueger (Robert Englund))
- The Godfather (1976 NTV edition) (Carlo Rizzi (Gianni Russo))
- The Godfather Part II (1980 NTV edition) (Vito Corleone (Robert De Niro))
- Godzilla (Mayor Ebert (Michael Lerner))
- Harry Potter series (Argus Filch (David Bradley))
- Heat (Vincent Hanna (Al Pacino))
- The Hitchhiker's Guide to the Galaxy (Slartibartfast (Bill Nighy))
- The Incredible Hulk (Jack McGee (Jack Colvin))
- Independence Day (Russell Casse (Randy Quaid))
- Instinct (Dr. Ethan Powell (Anthony Hopkins))
- Kickboxer (Xian Chow (Dennis Chan))
- Licence to Kill (1996 TBS edition) (Milton Krest (Anthony Zerbe))
- Lucky Stars Go Places (Chief Inspector Albert / Baldy (Karl Maka))
- Mad Max 2 (1991 TBS edition) (The Gyro Captain (Bruce Spence))
- Marked for Death (Screwface (Basil Wallace))
- Miami Vice (Narrator and Lieutenant Martin Castillo (Edward James Olmos))
- Mirrors (Lorenzo Sapelli (John Shrapnel))
- Monrak Transistor (Sadaw's father (Prasit Wongrakthai))
- Monty Python's Flying Circus (Michael Palin)
- Monty Python and the Holy Grail (Narrator (Michael Palin))
- Mr. Vampire (Father Kō (Lam Ching-ying))
- Nash Bridges (Joe Dominguez (Cheech Marin))
- Predator (1993 TV Asahi edition) (Blain Cooper (Jesse Ventura))
- Racing Stripes (2006 NTV edition) (Tucker)
- Rapid Fire (Mace Ryan (Powers Boothe))
- Raw Deal (1991 TV Asahi edition) (Martin "The Hammer" Lamanski (Steven Hill))
- The Rocketeer (A. "Peevy" Peabody (Alan Arkin))
- Seven (1998 Fuji TV edition) (Police Captain (R. Lee Ermey))
- Sniper (Thomas Beckett (Tom Berenger))
- Speed (1997 Fuji TV edition) (Howard Payne (Dennis Hopper))
- Spiritual Kung Fu (Luk (James Tien))
- The Texas Chainsaw Massacre (The Hitchhiker (Edwin Neal))
- Unleashed (Bart (Bob Hoskins))
- Vampire vs Vampire (One Eyebrow Priest (Lam Ching-ying))
- Where Eagles Dare (Major Von Happen (Derren Nesbitt))

==== Animation ====
- 101 Dalmatians II: Patch's London Adventure (Jasper Badun)
- Batman: The Animated Series (Joker)
- Batman: Mask of the Phantasm (Joker)
- Batman Beyond: Return of the Joker (Joker and New Joker)
- DuckTales the Movie: Treasure of the Lost Lamp (Genie)
- The Great Mouse Detective (Basil)
- The Halloween Tree (Mr. Moundshroud)
- Justice League (The Joker)
- The Little Mermaid (Dr. Viles)
- The Lion King 1½ (Uncle Max and Grumpy)
- The New Batman Adventures (The Joker)
- Pocahontas II: Journey to a New World (King James I)
- Robots (Madame Gasket)
- The Simpsons (Herbert Powell)
- Space Jam (Mr. Swackhammer)
- Shrek 2 (King Harold)
- Shrek Forever After (King Harold)
- Shrek the Third (King Harold)
- Tinker Bell and the Lost Treasure (Tall Troll)
- Thomas & Friends (Sir Topham Hatt (Season 5–8, replacing Kōhei Miyauchi))
- Thunderbirds (Additional voices)
- Thunderbird 6 TV edition (Aloysius "Nosey" Parker)
