= BakéGyamon =

Japanese media franchise

- Cover of the fifth manga volume

妖逆門 (Bakegyamon)
- Genre: Adventure; Fantasy
- Created by: Kazuhiro Fujita
- Manga
- Written by: Mitsuhisa Tamura
- Published by: Shogakukan
- English publisher: NA: Viz Media; SG: Chuang Yi
- Imprint: Shōnen Sunday Comics
- Magazine: Weekly Shōnen Sunday
- Original run: March 1, 2006 – March 20, 2007
- Volumes: 5
- Anime television series
- Directed by: Hiroshi Negishi
- Written by: Kazuho Hyodo
- Music by: Kazunori Miyake
- Studio: Radix Ace Entertainment
- Original network: TV Tokyo
- Original run: April 3, 2006 – March 26, 2007
- Episodes: 51
- icon

BakéGyamon (妖逆門, Bakegyamon) is a Japanese manga and anime series, with its concept created by Kazuhiro Fujita. The manga series, written and illustrated by Mitsuhisa Tamura, was published in Shogakukan's Weekly Shōnen Sunday from March 2006 to March 2007, with its chapters collected in five tankōbon volumes. In North America, Viz Media published it in English in 2009.

The 51-episode anime television series, directed by Hiroshi Negishi and produced by Radix Ace Entertainment, was broadcast on TV Tokyo from April 2006 to March 2007.

== Plot ==
Sanshiro Tamon's chances of having an adventure are slim to none in his tiny island hometown, until the day a mysterious stranger named Fue invites him to play a game. Sanshiro is taken to a backwards universe to play BakéGyamon, a game pitting monsters against monsters. Along the way he meets other players who have a particular reason for being there; to obtain the wish that is granted to the winner.

== Media ==
=== Manga ===
BakéGyamon's concept was created by Kazuhiro Fujita and the manga was written and illustrated by Mitsuhisa Tamura. It was serialized in Shogakukan's Weekly Shōnen Sunday from March 1, 2006, to March 20, 2007. (Note: It started in the magazine's 13th issue of 2006 (with cover date March 15), released on March 1 of that same year; it finished in the magazine's 16th issue of 2007 (with cover date April 4), released on March 20 of that same year.) Shogakukan collected its chapters in five tankōbon volumes, released from June 16, 2006, to May 18, 2007.

In North America, the manga was licensed by Viz Media in 2008, and published it as BakéGyamon: Backwards Game. The five volumes were released from March 3 to December 1, 2009. Chuang Yi licensed the manga in English in Singapore.

==== Volumes ====
No.	Original release date	Original ISBN	English release date	English ISBN
1	June 16, 2006	978-4-09-120440-0	March 3, 2009	978-1-4215-1793-3
2	September 15, 2006	978-4-09-120627-5	May 5, 2009	978-1-4215-1794-0
3	December 16, 2006	978-4-09-120705-0	August 4, 2009	978-1-4215-1795-7
4	February 16, 2007	978-4-09-121018-0	October 6, 2009	978-1-4215-1882-4
5	May 18, 2007	978-4-09-121069-2	December 1, 2009	978-1-4215-2171-8

=== Anime ===
A 51-episode anime television series directed by Hiroshi Negishi and produced by Radix Ace Entertainment was broadcast on TV Tokyo from April 3, 2006, to March 26, 2007.

=== Video game ===
A Nintendo DS 3D fighting game was published by Takara Tomy on March 1, 2007.
