= Moonlight Act =

Japanese manga series by Kazuhiro Fujita

- First volume cover, featuring Gekko Iwasaki (left) and Lady Teatro

月光条例 (Gekkō Jōrei)
- Genre: Adventure, fantasy
- Manga
- Written by: Kazuhiro Fujita
- Published by: Shogakukan
- Imprint: Shōnen Sunday Comics
- Magazine: Weekly Shōnen Sunday
- Original run: March 26, 2008 – April 9, 2014
- Volumes: 29
- icon

Moonlight Act (Japanese: 月光条例, Hepburn: Gekkō Jōrei; lit. 'Moonlight Regulation') is a Japanese manga series created by Kazuhiro Fujita. It was serialized in Shogakukan's shōnen manga magazine Weekly Shōnen Sunday from March 2008 to April 2014, with its chapters collected in 29 tankōbon volumes.

== Plot ==
A high-school student named Gekko Iwasaki is struck by moonlight and becomes an executioner of "moonlight regulation", who makes characters escaping from fairy tales come back to them.

== Characters ==
Gekko Iwasaki (岩崎月光, Iwasaki Gekko)
An aggressive high school boy of few friends. His family owns a ramen shop. He is charged, in spite of himself, to carry out the "moonlight regulation".
Lady Teatro (演劇部, Engeki-bu)
A member of a drama club who is popular in Gekko's high school.
Princess Hachikazuki (鉢かづき姫, Hachikazuki-hime)
A heroine escaping from the fairy tale. She is crazy for speed.

== Publication ==
Written and illustrated by Kazuhiro Fujita, Moonlight Act was serialized in Shogakukan's shōnen manga magazine Weekly Shōnen Sunday from March 26, 2008, (Note: Anime News Network incorrectly stated that the series began in the 18th issue, but it actually began in the 17th issue.) to April 9, 2014. Shogakukan collected its 286 individual chapters in 29 tankōbon volumes, released from June 18, 2008, to May 16, 2014.

=== Volumes ===
No.	Release date	ISBN
1	June 18, 2008	978-4-09-121420-1
2	September 18, 2008	978-4-09-121469-0
3	December 18, 2008	978-4-09-121519-2
4	March 18, 2009	978-4-09-121610-6
5	July 17, 2009	978-4-09-122018-9
6	September 17, 2009	978-4-09-121747-9
7	November 18, 2009	978-4-09-121886-5
8	February 18, 2010	978-4-09-122149-0
9	May 18, 2010	978-4-09-122297-8
10	August 18, 2010	978-4-09-122508-5
11	November 18, 2010	978-4-09-122660-0
12	January 18, 2010	978-4-09-122771-3
13	April 18, 2011	978-4-09-122854-3
14	July 17, 2011	978-4-09-123199-4
15	October 18, 2011	978-4-09-123336-3
16	January 18, 2012	978-4-09-123536-7
17	March 16, 2012	978-4-09-123618-0
18	May 18 2012	978-4-09-123656-2
19	August 17, 2012	978-4-09-123790-3
20	November 16, 2012	978-4-09-124011-8
21	February 18, 2013	978-4-09-124183-2
22	April 18, 2013	978-4-09-124284-6
23	June 18, 2013	978-4-09-124323-2
24	August 16, 2013	978-4-09-124361-4
25	November 18, 2013	978-4-09-124495-6
26	January 17, 2014	978-4-09-124550-2
27	February 18, 2014	978-4-09-124610-3
28	March 18, 2014	978-4-09-124611-0
29	May 16, 2014	978-4-09-124617-2

== Reception ==
Moonlight Act was nominated for the Seiun Award in the Best Comic category in 2015.
