= Sōbōtei Kowasubeshi =

Japanese manga series

- First tankōbon volume cover, featuring Seiichi Takoha

双亡亭壊すべし (Sōbōtei Kowasubeshi)
- Genre: Horror
- Manga
- Written by: Kazuhiro Fujita
- Published by: Shogakukan
- Imprint: Shōnen Sunday Comics
- Magazine: Weekly Shōnen Sunday
- Original run: March 23, 2016 – July 21, 2021
- Volumes: 25
- icon

Sōbōtei Kowasubeshi (双亡亭壊すべし; lit. 'Sōbōtei Must Be Destroyed') is a Japanese manga series written and illustrated by Kazuhiro Fujita. It was serialized in Shogakukan's shōnen manga magazine Weekly Shōnen Sunday from March 2016 to July 2021, with its chapters collected in 25 tankōbon volumes.

== Plot ==
Rokurō Tachiki, a young boy, moves with his father to the Sōbōtei mansion—a mysterious residence that has stood in Tokyo's Numanakari district since the Taishō era and is said to be haunted. There, he meets Tsutomu Takoha, a struggling picture book author living in a rundown apartment next to the mansion. One day, Rokurō's father is consumed by a sinister entity emerging from a portrait inside the mansion. After an unexplained explosion, Rokurō is rushed to the hospital. Meanwhile, the Self-Defense Force evacuates the Numanakari district in a failed attempt to demolish the Sōbōtei mansion. Horrified by the events and determined to uncover the truth, Rokurō vows to destroy the mansion.

== Characters ==
Tsutomu Takoha (凧葉 務, Takoha Tsutomu)
An art-school graduate and aspiring picture-book author, he lives in a run-down apartment building next to Sōbōtei. He meets his new neighbour, Rokurō, and gets embroiled in the evil mansion's plans.
Rokurō Tachiki (立木 緑朗, Tachiki Rokurō)
He and his father come to live in a small house on the edge of the Sōbōtei estate, and are caught up in the evil within the mansion. He becomes good friends with Seiichi, both aiming to destroy Sōbōtei.
Kurenai Tsuge (柘植 紅, Tsuge Kurenai)
A skilled "katana shaman" shrine maiden from a renowned lineage of practitioners on her mother's side; after her parents' divorce, she and her mother go to live and train with her grandmother, separating her from her beloved younger brother, Rokurō. She returns to protect him from the evil of Sōbōtei. Although she is famed for her skills, she can be naive and confused by certain societal norms. She is given a place to stay by Takoha, and joins the team of supernatural specialists who enter Sōbōtei.
Seiichi Takoha (凧葉 青一, Takoha Seiichi)
A mysterious youth with strange powers, including the transformation of his body into drills and a resilient, swiftly-healing body; he appears in the wreckage of a plane missing for 45 years. His father and Takoha's grandfather were brothers; once he is identified by his nametag the government bring Takoha in to meet him.
Yadorigi (宿木)
This sharp-eyed, uncompromising woman serves in the military branch of the Special Disasters Prevention and Response Department, and is a commander of troops when the supernatural specialists enter Sōbōtei. She seems cold and unreasonable, but is brave and concerned for the welfare of the others.
Travis Augusto (トラヴィス・アウグスト, Toravisu Augusuto)
An American scientist researching paranormal phenomena, with a focus on the relationship between magnetic fields and the spiritual world. He invented and is equipped with a portable electromagnetic emissions system ("reversers") which generate massive destructive electrical discharges. He is the head of a team from the American Supernatural Research Foundation, including his underlings Max, Kirk, and Graham, and his daughter, Nancy, as well as his ward Flor. He has a gruff and condescending manner, but acts in defence of others.
Flor Holopainen (フロル・ホロパイネン, Furoru Horopainen)
Augusto's legally-adopted daughter, from a poor, abusive background in Helsinki, who participates in his experiments on her psychic powers, the most powerful being her ability to apport objects within a certain range directly to her. She is also telepathic. Use of these powers can greatly weaken her physically. She is vital to the supernatural specialists' efforts to defeat Sōbōtei, coordinating strategies telepathically with Seiichi and others.
The Maags (マーグ, Māgu)
A rich couple who perform exorcisms; Barrett Maag (バレット・マーグ, Baretto Māgu), a retired businessman, conveys his wife Josephine (ジョセフィーン, Josefīn) in her wheelchair. She possesses pyrokinetic abilities, focused through a charred doll, "Mary", as well as certain extrasensory powers.
The Kirita sisters (鬼離田三姉妹, Kirita Sanshimai)
Three virtually-identical elegant sisters dressed in traditional Japanese clothing and sunglasses, Kikuyo (菊代), Yukiyo (雪代) and Kotoyo (琴代) have a disconcerting, flamboyant manner and are prone to outbursts of inappropriate laughter. They use incantations to summon spirits to act on their behalf, and are considered by Kurenai to be unmatched as diviners due to their extrasensory perceptive abilities, which include remote viewing. They can transfer their pupils to one sister (in practice, the eldest, Kikuyo), giving her greatly increased powers of foresight and ability to identify weaknesses in an opponent. They were harshly treated as children by their teacher and her assistants, kept caged, fed rotten canned food, and beaten when they made mistakes in their training, which resulted in their laughter as a defence mechanism.
Deido Sakamaki (坂巻 泥努, Sakamaki Deido)
A rich artist who built Sōbōtei, which was completed in 1935. Takoha once possessed a copy of his book "Curious Art- My Abode", which gave him insight into Sōbōtei.
Atsushi Shiba (斯波 敦, Shiba Atsushi)
The current prime minister of Japan. He and his best friend, Kiryuu (now Minister of Defence) entered Sōbōtei as boys with their friend Nanako, who fell victim to the mansion's evil. Since then, they have been dedicated to destroying Sōbōtei at all costs, and are the driving force behind the supernatural specialists' efforts.

== Publication ==
Sōbōtei Kowasubeshi, written and illustrated by Kazuhiro Fujita, was announced in November 2015. The series ran in Shogakukan's shōnen manga magazine Weekly Shōnen Sunday from March 23, 2016, to July 21, 2021. Shogakukan collected its 250 chapters into twenty-five tankōbon volumes, released from July 12, 2016, to August 18, 2021.

=== Volumes ===
No.	Japanese release date	Japanese ISBN
1	July 12, 2016	978-4-09-127179-2
2	October 18, 2016	978-4-09-127404-5
3	January 18, 2017	978-4-09-127485-4
4	April 18, 2017	978-4-09-127558-5
5	July 18, 2017	978-4-09-127667-4
6	October 18, 2017	978-4-09-127858-6
7	January 18, 2018	978-4-09-128077-0
8	April 18, 2018	978-4-09-128230-9
9	July 18, 2018	978-4-09-128334-4
10	September 18, 2018	978-4-09-128493-8
11	December 18, 2018	978-4-09-128595-9
12	March 18, 2019	978-4-09-128807-3
13	June 18, 2019	978-4-09-129169-1
14	September 18, 2019	978-4-09-129336-7
15	December 18, 2019	978-4-09-129454-8
16	March 18, 2020	978-4-09-129567-5
17	May 18, 2020	978-4-09-850073-4
18	July 17, 2020	978-4-09-850167-0
19	October 16, 2020	978-4-09-850273-8
20	January 18, 2021	978-4-09-850276-9
21	February 18, 2021	978-4-09-850394-0
22	March 17, 2021	978-4-09-850400-8
23	April 16, 2021	978-4-09-850521-0
24	June 17, 2021	978-4-09-850562-3
25	August 18, 2021	978-4-09-850642-2

== Reception ==
The series ranked eighth on "The Best Manga 2017 Kono Manga wo Yome!" ranking by Freestyle magazine. It was nominated for the 53rd Seiun Award in the Best Comic category in 2022. The series ranked 35th on the 2022 "Book of the Year" list by Da Vinci magazine.
