= Silver Mountain (manga) =

Japanese manga series

- First tankōbon volume cover, featuring Ginbē Haigō (left) and Hyōdo Saeki (right)

シルバーマウンテン (Shirubā Maunten)
- Genre: Fantasy; Martial arts
- Manga
- Written by: Kazuhiro Fujita
- Published by: Shogakukan
- Imprint: Shōnen Sunday Comics
- Magazine: Weekly Shōnen Sunday
- Original run: May 7, 2025 – present
- Volumes: 5
- icon

Silver Mountain (Japanese: シルバーマウンテン, Hepburn: Shirubā Maunten) is a Japanese manga series written and illustrated by Kazuhiro Fujita. It has been serialized in Shogakukan's shōnen manga magazine Weekly Shōnen Sunday since May 2025.

== Plot ==
In 1820, the Japanese scholar Hirata Atsutane encounters a peculiar boy named Torakichi (寅吉). The youth speaks with an unsettling maturity, and he reveals a fantastic secret: he is not from this era. Torakichi claims to have been spirited away by tengu—supernatural beings of the mountains—and brought from the future. Having traveled through time, he now exists in a rejuvenated, childlike body. Under the alias Ginbē Haigō (拝郷 銀兵衛, Haigō Ginbē), he begins to recount his incredible and otherworldly experiences to the fascinated Hirata.

== Publication ==
Written and illustrated by Kazuhiro Fujita, Silver Mountain started in Shogakukan's shōnen manga magazine Weekly Shōnen Sunday on May 7, 2025. Shogakukan released its first tankōbon volume on September 18, 2025. As of September 16, 2026, five volumes have been released.

No.	Release date	ISBN
1	September 18, 2025	978-4-09-854242-0
2	November 18, 2025	978-4-09-854326-7
3	February 18, 2026	978-4-09-854326-7
4	May 18, 2026	978-4-09-854586-5
5	September 16, 2026	978-4-09-854812-5

== Reception ==
The series was nominated for the 2025 Next Manga Award in the print category and placed 15th; it ranked fifth in the same category in the 2026 edition. It ranked 13th on Takarajimasha's Kono Manga ga Sugoi! list of best manga of 2026 for male readers. It ranked eleventh in the Nationwide Bookstore Employees' Recommended Comics list of 2026.
