= Jagan wa Gachirin ni Tobu =

Japanese manga series

- Volume cover, featuring Uhei Somaguchi (left) and Rin (right)

邪眼は月輪に飛ぶ
- Genre: Action, thriller
- Manga
- Written by: Kazuhiro Fujita
- Published by: Shogakukan
- Imprint: Big Spirits Comics
- Magazine: Weekly Big Comic Spirits
- Original run: 2006 – 2007
- Volumes: 1
- icon

Jagan wa Gachirin ni Tobu (邪眼は月輪に飛ぶ; lit. 'The Wicked Eyes Fly to the Full Moon') is a Japanese manga series written and illustrated by Kazuhiro Fujita. It was serialized in Shogakukan's seinen manga magazine Weekly Big Comic Spirits from 2006 to 2007, with the chapters collected in a single tankōbon volume.

== Synopsis ==
A mysterious bird escapes from a U.S. aircraft carrier that is stranded in Tokyo Bay. Anyone who crosses its path dies instantly. As the death toll in the city rises, the military calls on Uhei Somaguchi (杣口 鵜平, Somaguchi Uhei), a former fighter pilot and the only person to have ever wounded the creature. Accompanied by his adopted daughter, Rin (輪), a young priestess with supernatural powers, Somaguchi takes up arms once again to confront this otherworldly threat.

== Publication ==
Written and illustrated by Kazuhiro Fujita, Jagan wa Gachirin ni Tobu was serialized in Shogakukan's Weekly Big Comic Spirits from 2006 to 2007. Shogakukan collected the chapters in a single tankōbon volume, released on April 27, 2007.

=== Chapters ===
No.	Japanese release date	Japanese ISBN
1	April 27, 2007	978-4-09-181197-4
1. "Hunter From the Forest" (狩人は森に佇, Kariudo wa Mori ni Tatazu); 2. "Maiden Embarks Towards the City" (巫女は街を目指す, Miko wa Machi o Mezasu); 3. "Army In Despair" (軍人は絶望に沈む, Gunjin wa Zetsubō ni Shizumu); 4. "Agent Fraught With Darkness" (情報部員は暗黒を孕む, Ējento wa Ankoku o Haramu); 5. "High Speed Car Chase Through the City" (疾き車は街を駆ける, Hayaki Kuruma wa Machi o Kakeru); 6. "Tower Shaken by the Final Duel" (塔は決闘に震える, Tawā wa Kettō ni Furueru); 7. "The Wicked Eyes Fly to the Full Moon" (邪眼は月輪に飛ぶ, Jagan wa Gachirin ni Tobu)

== Reception ==
The manga was nominated for the Seiun Award in the Best Comic category at the 47th Japan Science Fiction Convention in 2008.
