= Furo Girl! =

Japanese manga series

- First tankōbon volume cover, featuring Sayoko Oyumino

ふろがーる！ (Furo Gāru!)
- Genre: Comedy
- Manga
- Written by: Yukio Katayama
- Published by: Shogakukan
- Magazine: Weekly Big Comic Spirits
- Original run: August 10, 2015 – November 21, 2016
- Volumes: 3
- Television drama
- Directed by: Junichi Ishikawa
- Produced by: Tatsuya Yamaga
- Written by: Yousuke Masaike; Yukari Nakamura
- Studio: TV Tokyo; Kyodo Television
- Original network: TV Tokyo
- Original run: July 16, 2020 – August 20, 2020
- Episodes: 6
- icon

Furo Girl! (Japanese: ふろがーる！, Hepburn: Furo Gāru!; lit. 'Bath Girl!') is a Japanese manga series written and illustrated by Yukio Katayama. It was serialized in Shogakukan's seinen manga magazine Weekly Big Comic Spirits from August 2015 to November 2016, with its chapters collected in three tankōbon volumes. The series depicts the lifestyle of a 25-year-old office worker and bath lover Sayoko Oyumino.

A six-episode television drama adaptation, starring Hinako Sakurai, was broadcast on TV Tokyo from July to August 2020.

== Plot ==
Sayoko Oyumino is a meticulous accountant at a Tokyo food company who finds refuge in her elaborate bathing rituals. A devoted enthusiast of traditional baths, she crafts seasonal infusions like cherry blossom baths to soothe her daily weariness. Her quiet passion contrasts with her professional efficiency, revealing a woman who cherishes solitude and sensory indulgence. The story follows Sayoko's introspective journey, where the quiet artistry of bathing mirrors her unspoken emotions and gradual embrace of life's changes.

== Characters ==
Sayoko Oyumino (生実野 早夜子, Oyumino Sayoko)
Portrayed by: Hinako Sakurai
A 25-year-old office worker that enjoys hot baths and tries various bathing methods to find the best bath.
Shiro (シロー)
A biker woman that is friends with Sayoko and sometimes travels on motorcycles with Sayoko to visit hot springs and bath houses.
Hachiike (八イケ)
A girl from Germany that befriends Sayoko and is not familiar with Japanese bathing customs.
Aino Hiyama (檜山 愛乃, Hiyama Aino)
Portrayed by: Sakurako Konishi
A junior student from Sayako's college days. She has a very "bright and high-tension" personality and described as a shower person. which contrasts with Sayako. She is original to the live-action series.

== Media ==
=== Manga ===
Written and illustrated by Yukio Katayama, Furo Girl! was serialized in Shogakukan's seinen manga magazine Weekly Big Comic Spirits from August 10, 2015, to November 21, 2016. Its chapters were collected in three tankōbon volumes, released from February 29, 2016, to February 28, 2017.

==== Volumes ====
No.	Japanese release date	Japanese ISBN
1	February 29, 2016	978-4-09-187460-3
1. "Sakura Bath" (桜風呂, Sakuraburo); 2. "Sake Bath" (お酒風呂, O Sake Furo); 3. "Planetarium Bath" (プラネタリウム風呂, Puranetariumu Furo); 4. "Baking Soda Bath" (重曹風呂, Jūsō Furo); 5. "Dokudami Bath" (ドクダミ風呂, Dokudami Furo); 6. "A Fated Reunion" (宿命の再会!, Shukumei no Saikai!); 7. "Mud Bath" (泥風呂, Doro Furo); 8. "Coin-operated Showers in Meguro, Tokyo" (東京都目黒区のコインシャワー, Tōkyō to Meguroku no Koinshawā); 9. "Yamanashi Onsen (Part 1)" (山梨県ほったらかし温泉（前編）, Yamanashi-ken Hottarakashi Onsen (Zenpen)); 10. "Yamanashi Onsen (Part 2)" (山梨県ほったらかし温泉（後編）, Yamanashi-ken Hottarakashi Onsen (Kōhen)); 11. "Super Public Bath in Bunkyō, Tokyo" (東京都文京区のスーパー銭湯, Tōkyō to Bunkyōku no Sūpā Sentō); 12. "Dogo Onsen, Ehime Prefecture (Part 1)" (愛媛県道後温泉（前編）, Ehime-ken Dōgo Onsen (Zenpen)); 13. "Dogo Onsen, Ehime Prefecture (Part 2)" (愛媛県道後温泉（後編）, Ehime-ken Dōgo Onsen (Kōhen)); 14. "Shichirigawa Onsen, Chiba Prefecture (Part 1)" (千葉県七里川温泉（前編）, Chiba-ken Shichirigawa Onsen (Zenpen)); 15. "Shichirigawa Onsen, Chiba Prefecture (Part 2)" (千葉県七里川温泉（後編）, Chiba-ken Shichirigawa Onsen (Kōhen))
2	July 29, 2016	978-4-09-187718-5
16. "Retro Onsen in Shinjuku, Tokyo" (東京都新宿区のレトロ温泉, Tōkyō to Shinjukuku no Retoro Onsen); 17. "Gotemba Onsen, Shizuoka Prefecture (Part 1)" (静岡県御殿場温泉（前編）, Shizuoka-ken Gotenba Onsen (Zenpen)); 18. "Gotemba Onsen, Shizuoka Prefecture (Part 2)" (静岡県御殿場温泉（後編）, Shizuoka-ken Gotenba Onsen (Kōhen)); 19. "Tama Ganban'yoku, Tokyo" (東京都多摩市の岩盤浴, Tōkyō to Tamashi no Ganban'yoku); 20. "Nikko Onsen, Tochigi Prefecture (Part 1)" (栃木県日光の温泉（前編）, Tochigi-ken Nikkō no Onsen (Zenpen)); 21. "Nikko Onsen, Tochigi Prefecture (Part 2)" (栃木県日光の温泉（後編）, Tochigi-ken Nikkō no Onsen (Kōhen)); 22. "Suginami Sentō, Tokyo" (東京都杉並区の銭湯, Tōkyō to Suginamiku no Sentō); 23. "Baths by the Sea, Shizuoka Prefecture (Part 1)" (静岡県の海辺風呂（前編）, Shizuoka-ken no Umibe Furo (Zenpen)); 24. "Baths by the Sea, Shizuoka Prefecture (Part 2)" (静岡県の海辺風呂（後編）, Shizuoka-ken no Umibe Furo (Kōhen)); 25. "Lying-down Bath in Inagi, Tokyo" (東京都稲城市の寝転び風呂, Tōkyō to Inagi-shi no Nekorobi Furo); 26. "Miura Coast, Kanagawa Prefecture -– Yokohama City Sky Bath (Part 1)" (神奈川県三浦海岸～横浜市の天空風呂（前編）, Kanagawa-ken Miura Kaigan ~ Yokohama-shi no Tenkū Furo (Zenpen)); 27. "Miura Coast, Kanagawa Prefecture -– Yokohama City Sky Bath (Part 2)" (神奈川県三浦海岸～横浜市の天空風呂（後編）, Kanagawa-ken Miura Kaigan ~ Yokohama-shi no Tenkū Furo (Kōhen)); 28. "Gyokuro Bath" (玉露風呂, Gyokuro Furo); 29. "Ikaho Onsen, Gunma Prefecture (Part 1)" (群馬県伊香保温泉（前編）, Gunma-ken Ikaho Onsen (Zenpen)); 30. "Ikaho Onsen, Gunma Prefecture (Part 2)" (群馬県伊香保温泉（後編）, Gunma-ken Ikaho Onsen (Kōhen))
3	February 28, 2017	978-4-09-189380-2
31. "Setagaya Sentō, Tokyo" (東京都世田谷区の銭湯, Tōkyō to Setagaya-ku no Sentō); 32. "Yanesen Sentō, Tokyo (Part 1)" (東京都「谷根千」の銭湯（前編）, Tōkyō to 'Yanesen' no Sentō (Zenpen)); 33. "Yanesen Sentō, Tokyo (Part 2)" (東京都「谷根千」の銭湯（後編）, Tōkyō to 'Yanesen' no Sentō (Kōhen)); 34. "Hot-and-cold Bath" (温冷浴, Onreiyoku); 35. "German Hot Spring 1" (ドイツの湯1, Doitsu no Yu 1); 36. "German Hot Spring 2" (ドイツの湯2, Doitsu no Yu 2); 37. "German Hot Spring 3" (ドイツの湯3, Doitsu no Yu 3); 38. "German Hot Spring 4" (ドイツの湯4, Doitsu no Yu 4); 39. "Cats, Showers, and Once Again, Japanese Hot Spring" (ネコとシャワーとあらためて日本の湯, Neko to Shawā to Aratamete Nihon no Yu); 40. "Okinawa Hot Spring (Part 1)" (沖縄の湯（前編）, Okinawa no Yu (Zenpen)); 41. "Okinawa Hot Spring (Part 2)" (沖縄の湯（後編）, Okinawa no Yu (Kōhen)); 42. "Yamanashi Hottarakashi Onsen Again" (山梨県ほったらかし温泉再び, Yamanashi-ken Hottarakashi Onsen Futatabi); 43. "Floating Bath" (浮かび風呂, Ukabi Furo); 44. "Tropical Hot Spring" (南国の湯, Nangoku no Yu); 45. "Family Bath" (実家風呂, Jikka Furo)

Chapters not released in tankōbon

These two chapters were published in Big Comic Spirits as chapters 3 and 7, but were omitted from the tankōbon releases, changing the chapter numbers for the rest of the chapters in them.

- 3. "Holiday Reward" (休日のごほうび, Kyūjitsu no go Hōbi)
- 7. "You Are Already In" (お前はもう入っている, Omae wa mō Haitte Iru)

=== Drama ===
A six-episode television drama adaptation was broadcast on TV Tokyo from July 16 to August 20, 2020. (Note: TV Tokyo listed the air dates for the series on Wednesday at 24:58, which is effectively Thursday at 0:58 a.m. JST.)

==== Episodes ====
No.	Title	Original release date
1	"The World's Most Peaceful Bomb – Bath Bomb" "Sekaiichi Heiwana Bakudan Basubomu" (Japanese: 世界一平和な爆弾 バスボム」)	July 16, 2020
Sayoko Oyumino has a daily routine to arranging her own bath. One day, she buys a capsule toy and just before throwing away the empty capsule, she comes up with the idea of making a bath bomb. As soon as she starts making bath bombs, she receives a phone call from her junior, Aino Hiyama.
2	"Summer Oranges Are the Beginning of the "Prosperity" Season" "Natsumikan wa "Hae" no Hajimari" (Japanese: 夏みかんは"映え"のはじまり)	July 23, 2020
3	"Love, Rain and Mist Sauna" "Koi to Ame to Misuto Sauna" (Japanese: 恋と雨とミストサウナ)	July 30, 2020
4	"Bubble Bath DE Ooooh!" "Awafuro DE Uōooo" (Japanese: 泡風呂DEうおおおぉ)	August 6, 2020
5	"Are Summer Baths Heaven or Hell?" "Natsu no Furo wa Tengoku ka Jigoku?" (Japanese: 夏の風呂は天国か地獄?)	August 13, 2020
6	"Sanyoko vs. Bath: The Last Battle" "Sayoko VS Furo Saigo no Tatakai" (Japanese: 早夜子VS風呂 最後の戦い)	August 20, 2020

== See also ==
- Hanamote Katare, another manga series by the same author
- Yoake no Ryodan, another manga series by the same author
