= Kazuhiro Fujita's Short Stories =

Japanese manga series

- Yoru no Uta cover, featuring Princess Rangiku of "Puppet Princess"

藤田和日郎短編集 (Fujita Kazuhiro Tanpenshū)
- Manga

Yoru no Uta
- Written by: Kazuhiro Fujita
- Published by: Shogakukan
- Imprint: Shōnen Sunday Comics
- Published: July 18, 1995
- Volumes: 1
- Original video animation

Puppet Princess
- Directed by: Hirotoshi Takaya
- Produced by: Masahito Yoshioka
- Written by: Junichi Miyashita
- Music by: Kaoru Wada
- Studio: TMS Entertainment
- Licensed by: NA: Media Blasters
- Released: March 24, 2000
- Runtime: 42 minutes
- Manga

Akatsuki no Uta
- Written by: Kazuhiro Fujita
- Published by: Shogakukan
- Imprint: Shōnen Sunday Comics
- Published: February 18, 2004
- Volumes: 1
- icon

Kazuhiro Fujita Short Stories (Japanese: 藤田和日郎短編集, Hepburn: Fujita Kazuhiro Tanpenshū) is a Japanese anthology manga series written and illustrated by Kazuhiro Fujita and published by Shogakukan. The first collection, Yoru no Uta, contains five stories and was released in July 1995. The second collection, Akatsuki no Uta, contains four stories and was released in February 2004.

An original video animation (OVA) adaptation of the story "Puppet Princess", from Yoru no Uta, was produced by TMS Entertainment and released in March 2000. It has been licensed in North America by Media Blasters.

== Publication ==
The first collected volume, Yoru no Uta (夜の歌; lit. 'Night Songs'), includes five stories that were published in Shogakukan's Weekly Shōnen Sunday and Shōnen Sunday Zōkan between 1988 and 1994. The volume was released on July 18, 1995. The second collected volume, Akatsuki no Uta (暁の歌; lit. 'Dawn Songs'), includes four stories that were published in Shogakukan's Weekly Shōnen Sunday and Weekly Young Sunday between 1996 and 2003. It was released on February 18, 2004. Shogakukan re-released the volumes in a bunkoban edition on April 15 and May 13, 2006; this re-release included a new story in each volume, with Yoru no Uta including "In the Forest with Aki-chan" (アキちゃんと森で, Aki-chan to Mori de), and Akatsuki no Uta including "Sword-Carrying Stone Buddha" (帯刀石仏, Tatewaki Sekibutsu).

=== Yoru no Uta ===
No.	Release date	ISBN
1	July 18, 1995	4-09-123561-1
1. "Puppet Princess" (からくりの君, Karakuri no Kimi); 2. "Song of the Open Palm" (掌の歌, Tenohira no Uta); 3. "Strange Ferry Tale" (連絡船奇譚, Renrakusen Kitan); 4. "To the Merry-Go-Round!" (メリーゴーランドへ!, Merī gō Rando e!); 5. "Shall We Go Out Walking by Night? – Part 1" (夜に散歩しないかね＜前編＞, Yoru ni Sanpo Shinai ka ne Zenpen); 6. "Shall We Go Out Walking by Night? – Part 2" (夜に散歩しないかね＜後編＞, Yoru ni Sanpo Shinai ka ne Kōhen)

=== Akatsuki no Uta ===
No.	Release date	ISBN
1	February 18, 2004	4-09-123562-X
1. "Attack of a Moment – Part 1" (瞬撃の虚空（前編）, Shungeki no Kokū (Zenpen)); 2. "Attack of a Moment – Part 2" (瞬撃の虚空（後編）, Shungeki no Kokū (Kōhen)); 3. "In the Sky, a Feather..." (空に羽が…, Sora ni Hane ga…); 4. "Gemel's Shop of Space Weapons – Part 1" (ゲメル宇宙武器店（前編）, Gemeru Uchū Buki-ten Zenpen); 5. "Gemel's Shop of Space Weapons – Part 2" (ゲメル宇宙武器店（後編）, Gemeru Uchū Buki-ten Kōhen); 6. "The Advent of Gastroking" (美食王の到着, Gasutokingu no Tōchaku)

== Puppet Princess ==
"Puppet Princess" (からくりの君, Karakuri no Kimi), a story included in the Yoru no Uta collection, was adapted into a 42-minute original video animation (OVA) produced by TMS Entertainment and released on March 24, 2000, on VHS. A DVD version was released as a bonus disc for the 20th Anniversary of the Artistic Career: The Soul of Kazuhiro Fujita (画業20周年記念全集 藤田和日郎魂, Gagyō 20 Shūnenkinen Zenshū Fujita Kazuhiro Tamashii) artbook on July 17, 2009.

In December 2000, Media Blasters announced that it had licensed the OVA in North America, and it was released on VHS and DVD on September 25, 2001. In August 2020, Media Blasters announced that the OVA would be released on Blu-ray. It was released on Blu-ray and DVD on February 23, 2021. The OVA was added to the RetroCrush streaming service with both English subtitles and dub on June 4, 2021.
