= Rock Is a Lady's Modesty =

Japanese manga series

- First tankōbon volume cover, featuring Lilisa Suzunomiya

ロックは淑女(レディ)の嗜みでして (Rokku wa Redi no Tashinami deshite)
- Genre: Coming-of-age; Music
- Manga
- Written by: Hiroshi Fukuda
- Published by: Hakusensha
- English publisher: NA: Yen Press
- Imprint: Young Animal Comics
- Magazine: Young Animal
- Original run: October 28, 2022 – present
- Volumes: 8
- Anime television series
- Directed by: Shinya Watada
- Written by: Shōgo Yasukawa
- Music by: Kanade Sakuma; Tatsuhiko Saiki; Tsugumi Tanaka; Natsumi Tabuchi
- Studio: BN Pictures
- Licensed by: Sentai Filmworks: SEA: Medialink
- Original network: JNN (TBS)
- Original run: April 3, 2025 – June 26, 2025
- Episodes: 13
- icon

Rock Is a Lady's Modesty (Japanese: ロックは淑女(レディ)の嗜みでして, Hepburn: Rokku wa Redi no Tashinami deshite; lit. 'Rock Is a Lady's Pursuit/Interest') is a Japanese manga series written and illustrated by Hiroshi Fukuda. It has been serialized in Hakusensha's seinen manga magazine Young Animal since October 2022. The series follows a young girl, forced to abandon her guitar after her mother's marriage to a real estate tycoon thrusts her into a life of luxury. Her passion for music is reignited when she meets a skilled drummer at her new prestigious school, and the two form a band.

An anime television series adaptation produced by BN Pictures aired from April to June 2025.

== Plot ==
Lilisa Suzunomiya is a young student at the prestigious and elite Oshin Girls' Academy. However, having been adopted by a rich father through her mother's remarriage rather than being born into one, Lilisa has to work hard to put up the facade of being a cultured and sophisticated student in order to win the school's prized title of Noble Maiden, which includes giving up her dream of playing the guitar that she got from her biological father. However, a twist of fate brings her together with fellow student Otoha Kurogane, and she discovers Otoha's secret love for drums and rock music. After taking up her guitar once again, Lilisa and Otoha begin to secretly indulge in their love for rock music.

== Characters ==
=== Main characters ===
Lilisa Suzunomiya (鈴ノ宮 りりさ, Suzunomiya Ririsa)
Voiced by: Akira Sekine (Japanese); Luci Christian (English)
Motion capture by: Kanami (Band-Maid)
A first-year student at Oshin Girls' Academy who became the daughter of the prestigious Suzunomiya family after her mother's remarriage. Her birth surname was Kobayashi (小林). To conform to high society's expectations, she crafted the perfect image of a refined young lady—even abandoning her beloved guitar, a cherished gift from her father. However, when she meets Otoha, her buried passion for music begins to rekindle, leading her to reclaim her true self and eventually form a band with her.
Otoha Kurogane (黒鉄 音羽, Kurogane Otoha)
Voiced by: Miyuri Shimabukuro (Japanese); Natalie Rial (English)
Motion capture by: Akane (Band-Maid)
A first-year at Oshin Girls' Academy from a prominent political family, she is the school's most admired student—yet secretly a relentless drummer. After meeting Lilisa, the two start a band together. She strongly believes in playing music for the joy of it rather than pleasing an audience.
Tina Isemi (院瀬見 ティナ, Isemi Tina)
Voiced by: Ayaka Fukuhara (Japanese); Karlii Hoch (English)
Motion capture by: Saiki (Band-Maid)
A second-year student at Oshin Girls' Academy, where she is the student council vice-president. Her family owns a cosmetics brand where she works as their top model. While she maintains a dashing princely persona in public, even using the masculine pronoun boku and wearing a corset to hide her busty figure, her true nature is that of a gentle maiden. Her interest in rock music blossoms after watching Lilisa perform, leading her to train herself to use a keyboard and join her band. She is also the group's costume designer.
Tamaki Shiraya (白矢 環, Shiraya Tamaki)
Voiced by: Natsumi Fujiwara (Japanese); Annie Wild (English)
Motion capture by: Misa (Band-Maid)
A second-year student at Kuroyuri Girls' School, Oshin Girls' Academy's sister institution, and Otoha's childhood friend. Despite having a reputation as a skilled session musician in underground rock circles, she remained unaffiliated with any band—until reuniting with Otoha, when she joined her and Lilisa's group as their bassist. At school, she puts on the façade of a traditional Japanese maiden. It is later revealed that her father is the Superintendent general of the Tokyo Metropolitan Police Department.

=== Supporting characters ===
Alice Suzunomiya (鈴ノ宮 愛莉珠, Suzunomiya Arisu)
Voiced by: Saho Shirasu (Japanese); Christina Kelly (English)
A student at Oshin Girls' Academy's middle school branch, she is the biological daughter of the Suzunomiya household and Lilisa's younger stepsister. Initially perceiving her stepmother and stepsister as intruders into her prestigious family, she seeks to expose Lilisa's facade and drive them out. However, she becomes a fan of Lilisa after hearing her perform. She is also a skilled violin player.
Yuka Suzunomiya (鈴ノ宮 有花, Suzunomiya Yuka)
Voiced by: Kaori Nazuka (Japanese); Genevieve Simmons (English)
Lilisa's mother, who recently remarried into the prestigious Suzunomiya family. Though seemingly a kind woman, she emotionally pressures Lilisa to conform to high society's standards and abandon her love for rock music. She remains unaware of Lilisa secretly picking up guitar playing again.
Yukari Fujimurasaki (藤紫 ゆかり, Fujimurasaki Yukari)
Voiced by: Kanae Itō (Japanese); Olivia Swasey (English)
Oshin Girls' Academy's student council president and a Noble Maiden. She chooses Tina as her vice-president and later invites Lilisa to the council as well, unaware of their true natures.
Aki (アキ)
Voiced by: Hiromi Igarashi (Japanese); Brittney Karbowski (English)
The leader of Bitter Ganache, whom Tamaki played with as a session musician.

== Production ==
=== Anime ===
Director Shinya Watada was introduced to the manga series in 2023. He read the manga on a friend's recommendation and found the story interesting. When BN Pictures offered him the role of director for the anime series, Watada was surprised and considered it fate, gladly accepting the offer. Assistant director Ōri Yasukawa had previously played drums in an amateur band. During the pre-production phase of the drum scenes in the second episode, the staff relied heavily on his skills.

Although the production team had already decided to use motion capture for the performance scenes, the idea that the group participating in the motion capture would be the same as the one performing the opening song came later. During discussions about which band to choose, Watada suggested Band-Maid and the idea was immediately well received. To observe them live, producer Tatsuya Sunako attended one of the band's live performances. When he saw Kanami and Akane's performances, he immediately compared them to Otoha and Lilisa. The staff also consulted Hiroshi Fukuda for suggestions regarding the characters' backstories.

Four members of Band-Maid participated in the motion capture for the characters: Akane (Otoha), Kanami (Lilisa), Saiki (Tina), and Misa (Tamaki). In an interview, Akane stated that the music was very difficult and she had to imagine how Lilisa would perform. Since sensors were placed not only on the instruments but also on the drumsticks' handles, she had to be careful not to damage them, which interfered with her performance. After the production team assured her not to worry about the sensors, she was able to focus on her performance.

In an interview, Akira Sekine, Lilisa's voice actress, described the atmosphere in the recording studio as calm and peaceful. She was disappointed to miss the initial audition due to flu but was able to join the next day. To prepare for their roles, Sekine and Miyuri Shimabukuro, Otoha's voice actress, bought and read books about ladies. According to Sekine, recording the intense shouting scene between Lilisa and Otoha in the first episode required a lot of energy. To help the voice actresses better understand their characters, Fukuda shared extra stories that were not included in the manga. Although voice acting is usually done without music, Sekine was invited to listen to the music during the recording process. Shimabukuro stated that while voicing Otoha, she paid attention to her fingertips, straightened her posture, and stood freely in front of the microphone, trying to reflect the character's elegance through her own posture and behavior.

== Media ==
=== Manga ===
Written and illustrated by Hiroshi Fukuda, Rock Is a Lady's Modesty started in Hakusensha's seinen manga magazine Young Animal on October 28, 2022. In July 2025, it was announced that the manga would go on an indefinite hiatus. Hakusensha has collected its chapters into individual tankōbon volumes, with the first one released on April 28, 2023. As of August 29, 2025, eight volumes have been released.

In April 2025, Yen Press announced that they licensed the series for English publication beginning in September 2025.

==== Volumes ====
No.	Original release date	Original ISBN	English release date	English ISBN
1	April 28, 2023	978-4-592-16476-0	September 23, 2025	979-8-8554-0797-6
Chapters 1–5
2	June 29, 2023	978-4-592-16477-7	March 24, 2026	979-8-8554-0799-0
Chapters 6–13
3	October 27, 2023	978-4-592-16478-4	August 25, 2026	979-8-8554-0801-0
Chapters 14–20
4	February 29, 2024	978-4-592-16479-1	March 23, 2027	979-8-8554-0803-4
Chapters 21–28
5	July 29, 2024	978-4-592-16480-7	—	—
Chapters 29–36
6	November 28, 2024	978-4-592-16716-7	—	—
Chapters 37–43
7	March 28, 2025	978-4-592-16717-4	—	—
Chapters 44–49
8	August 29, 2025	978-4-592-16718-1	—	—
Chapters 50–56

=== Anime ===
In July 2024, it was announced that the manga would receive an anime television series adaptation. It is produced by BN Pictures and directed by Shinya Watada, with Ōri Yasukawa as assistant director, Shōgo Yasukawa handling series composition and episode screenplays, and Risa Miyadani designing the characters. The series aired from April 3 to June 26, 2025, on TBS and its affiliates. The opening theme song is "Ready to Rock", performed by Band-Maid, while the ending theme song is "Yume Janai nara Nan'na no sa" (夢じゃないならなんなのさ; lit. 'If It's Not a Dream, Then What Is It?'), performed by Little Glee Monster.

Sentai Filmworks licensed the series in North America for streaming on Hidive; Hidive would later announce on June 30, 2025, that the series would receive an English dub, which premiered on September 17 of that same year. Medialink licensed the series in Southeast Asia.

==== Episodes ====
No.	Title	Directed by (Note: Production staff information is taken from the ending credits of each episode.)	Storyboarded by	Original release date
1	"Good Day to You ♡"; Transliteration: "Gokigenyō ♡" (Japanese: ごきげんよう♡)	Ōri Yasukawa	Shinya Watada	April 3, 2025
1	"Quit Playing the Guitar!!!"; Transliteration: "Sonna Gitā Yamechimae!!!" (Japanese: そんなギターやめちまえ!!!)	Ōri Yasukawa	Shinya Watada	April 3, 2025
Lilisa Suzunomiya is a popular student at the prestigious Oshin Girls' Academy. In truth, however, she is putting up a facade to attain the school's most revered title, the Noble Maiden, even though she feels suffocated by the institution's conservative structure. Lilisa later finds a guitar pick after crossing paths with another popular student, Otoha Kurogane, and deduces it belongs to the latter after spotting her trying to find it the next day. Intrigued, she secretly follows Otoha to the school's old music room, where she discovers she is secretly a skilled drummer. Though surprised to see Otoha acting contrary to her reputation, Lilisa returns the guitar pick and promises not to tell anyone. However, Otoha infers that Lilisa can play guitar and invites her to play with her. Lilisa is initially reluctant, as she had previously given up on the guitar, but is prompted to prove herself after Otoha insinuates she lacks skill. After playing, however, while Lilisa was satisfied with their performance, Otoha profanely exclaims the former's skills to be lackluster, much to Lilisa's shock and anger.
2	"Let's Collaborate! ♡"; Transliteration: "Majiwarimashou ♡" (Japanese: 交わりましょう♡)	Megumi Yamamoto	Ōri Yasukawa	April 11, 2025 (Note: Due to the broadcast of the 2025 Masters Tournament, this episode aired at 1:28 a.m. JST, 1 hour and 32 minutes after the original air time on TBS.)
2	"I Will NEVER Admit to That!"; Transliteration: "Zettai, Mitomenai!" (Japanese: 絶対、認めない！)	Megumi Yamamoto	Ōri Yasukawa	April 11, 2025
The next day, Otoha approaches Lilisa about playing together again. However, still angered by Otoha's mockery despite her apologizing, Lilisa refuses to speak to her and doubles down on becoming a Noble Maiden to ease her mother's remarriage into the Suzunomiya family. Unfortunately, Otoha stalks her throughout the day, and playing guitar again has caused her facade to start slipping. She is also struggling with her violin lessons and her strained relationship with her stepsister Alice at home. Lilisa tries approaching the student council president, Noble Maiden Yukari Fujimurasaki, but Otoha interrupts her. While initially repeating that she does not want to associate with Otoha, Lilisa becomes intrigued by why she plays drums and confronts her in the music room to question her. When Otoha elaborates that it is simply to lose herself in her unique passion, Lilisa becomes envious, since she gave up on the guitar to become a Noble Maiden, and agrees to play with her again to prove that she has moved on.
3	"Let's Do It! Let's Do What Feels Good!"; Transliteration: "Yarimashō!!! Kimochīi Koto!!!" (Japanese: やりましょう!!! 気持ちいい事!!!)	Kento Nakagome	Yasufumi Soejima & Kento Nakagome	April 17, 2025
3	"Wanna Start A Band?"; Transliteration: "Bando Kumanai?" (Japanese: バンド組まない？)	Kento Nakagome	Yasufumi Soejima & Kento Nakagome	April 17, 2025
Lilisa and Otoha once again engage in a rock session, with Lilisa ruminating on how she was forced to give up not only her love for guitar, but all of her other "low class" hobbies in order to fit in with the Suzunomiya family. However, playing in conjunction with Otoha reignites her passion for the guitar and rock music, and she agrees to form a band with Otoha. The next day, Lilisa has trouble maintaining her composure during class though her classmates misinterpret such acts as passion for her studies. After school, Lilisa meets with Otoha to determine their band's direction, mission, and rules. They decide to be an instrumental rock band with the goal of performing at Fuji Rock Festival. Lilisa also insists that they avoid hurling abuse at each other after their practice sessions, as she feels that will distract from her mission to become the Noble Maiden. While Otoha agrees with Lilisa, they both quickly break the rule and fall back into bickering after their session. Meanwhile, Alice meets some of her classmates who have ended up revering Lilisa, which triggers Alice's hidden contempt for her due to perceiving her as an intruder into the Suzunomiya family.
4	"Want to Use a Peer Seeker?"; Transliteration: "Menbo Shite miru?" (Japanese: メン募してみる？)	Takashi Kojima	Nagisa Miyazaki	April 24, 2025
4	"I'll Get Them Thrown Out!"; Transliteration: "Oidashiteyaru!" (Japanese: 追い出してやる！)	Takashi Kojima	Nagisa Miyazaki	April 24, 2025
In order to complete their band, Lilisa decides to use a Peer Seeker app to recruit a bassist and keyboardist. However, most of the applicants have poor reviews due to various issues, forcing Lilisa to be more vigilant in her search. She does find an open request for a bassist and drummer from a symphonic band called Red Familia, in order to fill in for absent members for an important performance. While it is not a rock band, Lilisa reasons that such a simple job would be good experience for her and Otoha to perform in front of an audience for the first time. Meanwhile, Alice follows a cat and inadvertently arrives at the old schoolhouse Lilisa and Otoha are practicing in. Catching sight of Lilisa playing the guitar, Alice enters the schoolhouse to confront her but one of Otoha's classmates tips them off. Lilisa and Otoha are able to hide the guitar and bluff Alice into leaving, not before telling Lilisa of being her mother's puppet, though she remains suspicious. On the day of the performance, Lilisa and Otoha meet Red Familia while by pure coincidence, Alice accompanies her friend Hiyori Himejima to watch the same performance.
5	"My Heart is Racing ♡"; Transliteration: "Dokidoki Shimasu wa ne ♡" (Japanese: ドキドキしますわね♡)	Ken Katō	Yasufumi Soejima & Atsushi Shigeta	May 1, 2025
5	"Whip Yours Out, Too!"; Transliteration: "Kocchi wa Dashite nda, Temē mo Dashite miro!!!" (Japanese: こっちは出してんだ、テメーも出してみろ!!!)	Ken Katō	Yasufumi Soejima & Atsushi Shigeta	May 1, 2025
Since many of Red Familia's musicians are amateurs, their performance during practice is slow, leaving Lilisa and Otoha unsatisfied. However, after the conductor, Uekusa, is harassed by his rival, singer Jun Ishitani, about symphonic bands never matching ones with vocalists, the two resolve to go all-out during the actual performance. Meanwhile, Alice accompanies Hiyori to the recital and recognizes Lilisa when Red Familia takes the stage. When the performance starts, Lilisa and Otoha take control of the tempo, pushing the others to keep pace, resulting in a lively performance that draws a large crowd. Afterward, Ishitani tries recruiting the girls, but Lilsa, still energized by the performance, rudely turns him down. Alice then confronts Lilisa, but the latter convinces her stepsister to keep her performance a secret. Upon returning home, intrigued by Lilisa's true personality, Alice asks her stepmother what she was like before the remarriage, only to become disturbed when the latter insists they were always part of the Suzunomiya family. Meanwhile, after calming down, Lilisa begins to panic over Alice knowing her secret, and Otoha muses about being in a band with Lilisa.
6	"Will You Let Me Join Your Band?"; Transliteration: "Menbā ni Irete Kurenai ka…?" (Japanese: メンバーに入れてくれないか…？)	Megumi Yamamoto & Takashi Kojima	Kazuo Terada	May 8, 2025
6	"Get Rid of Her, Immediately"; Transliteration: "Ima sugu, Aitsu wa Sutero" (Japanese: 今すぐ、あいつは捨てろ)	Megumi Yamamoto & Takashi Kojima	Kazuo Terada	May 8, 2025
Three days after the concert, Lilisa continues striving to become a Noble Maiden, being scouted for the student council. However, she has a chance encounter with the vice president—Oshin's "prince"—Tina Isemi, who appears to recognize Lilisa, prompting her to flee. After school, Lilisa practices with Otoha when she receives a message on the Peer Seeker app from "Shiro", whom Otoha recognizes, and leaves to meet them. Lilisa practices alone when Tina catches her and reveals she saw the concert, causing her to panic. Fortunately, Tina requests to join Lilisa's band, explaining her public persona is just a front and that she wants to gain real self-confidence. Lilisa has Tina try out the keyboard, but her lack of assertiveness holds her back. Meanwhile, Otoha meets Shiro, who is her old acquaintance, famous session musician Tamaki Shiraya. Tamaki is aware of Otoha's performance at the concert and is convinced to join the band. However, Tamaki does not consider Lilisa a worthy guitarist, and only joins as their bassist on the condition that they perform in a battle of the bands in two weeks.
7	"I Want to Change!"; Transliteration: "Boku wa, Jibun o Kaetai…!" (Japanese: 僕は、自分を変えたい…！)	Kento Nakagome	Susumu Nishizawa	May 15, 2025
7	"Get on my Level, Friggin' Noob"; Transliteration: "Kore Gurai Konaseyo, Hetakuso" (Japanese: これぐらいこなせよ、下手くそ)	Kento Nakagome	Susumu Nishizawa	May 15, 2025
Otoha explains that Tamaki's previous band, Bitter Ganache, got angry when they learned Tamaki planned to leave to join Otoha, and challenged her to a battle of the bands to determine which band Tamaki will join. Otoha gladly accepted the challenge since it would be her first battle of the bands. Tamaki only agrees since she is also curious about what Otoha sees in Lilisa. During practice, Lilisa struggles to keep up with Tamaki's bass performance, as she cannot get a read on her emotions and respond in kind. In addition, Lilisa is tasked with coaching Tina on the keyboard, and although the latter's progress is slow, Lilisa is impressed with the effort Tina puts into it. With eight days remaining until the battle of the bands, all four members of the band practice together for the first time. However, Tamaki is not impressed with Tina's performance and demands that Lilisa kick Tina out of the band.
8	"In No Way is That a Waste!"; Transliteration: "Muda na Wake Naidesho!!" (Japanese: ムダなワケないでしょ!!)	Hirotaka Endo	Takahiro Okawa	May 22, 2025
8	"I Have a Secret Plan!"; Transliteration: "Hisaku ga Arimasu wa ♡" (Japanese: 秘策がありますわ♡)	Hirotaka Endo	Takahiro Okawa	May 22, 2025
Tamaki reasons that Tina's removal from the band improves their chances at winning against Bitter Ganache, and Tina herself considers leaving. However, Lilisa rejects Tamaki's demands, reiterating her desire for the band to express their true selves. She insists for more time to coach Tina, which Tamaki grudgingly accepts. On the way home, Otoha teases Tamaki, noting how the latter had many similarities to Tina when she first picked up an interest in rock music. Five days later, the band practices again, and while Tamaki is impressed by Tina's improved skill, she still does not deem it good enough. Otoha then reveals she also helped in Tina's training, which convinces Tamaki to give Tina a chance. On the day of the battle of the bands, the girls arrive at the venue and get into a brief confrontation with Bitter Ganache. Upon finding out most of the crowd are attending purely to see Tamaki, a jealous Lilisa swears to make a performance that surpasses hers.
9	"It is Finally Our Turn"; Transliteration: "Iyoiyo Watashi Tachi no Bandesu wa ne ♡" (Japanese: いよいよ私達の番ですわね♡)	Ōri Yasukawa	Yasufumi Soejima	May 29, 2025
9	"You're All Too Loud!"; Transliteration: "Zenbu, Uruse e nda yo!!!" (Japanese: 全部、うるせえんだよ!!!)	Ōri Yasukawa	Yasufumi Soejima	May 29, 2025
After Bitter Ganache concludes their performance, Lilisa and her band begin playing their set, despite Tamaki remaining unconvinced that Lilisa and Tina will live up to her and Otoha's skills. Tina initially struggles to keep up with the rhythm and considers quitting midway through their song, but Otoha guides her using her drumbeat, allowing Tina to enjoy the set. Despite having resolved Tina's situation, Lilisa grows frustrated that Bitter Ganache and the audience are left unimpressed with the performance and her guitar skills, and they begin waiting for the next performers. Otoha suddenly goes all-out playing their final song, and not wanting to be upstaged, Lilisa follows suit. Tamaki reins in Lilisa and Otoha's playing to prevent their performance from spiraling out of control, though she begins warming up to their performance alongside Tina. The exhausted girls conclude their set and leave Bitter Ganache and the audience in awe.
10	"I Know You Can Do Way Better Than That"; Transliteration: "An'na mon Janedaro!!" (Japanese: あんなもんじゃねぇだろ!!)	Hideaki Nakano	Atsushi Otsuki	June 5, 2025
10	"I Wanna Rock Out With Them Again"; Transliteration: "Aitsura to, Rokku ga Shitai!!!" (Japanese: あいつらと、ロックがしたい!!!)	Hideaki Nakano	Atsushi Otsuki	June 5, 2025
Believing they lost when their performance fails to get applause from the audience, who are in shock, Lilisa and Otoha get into an argument backstage over whose fault it is. This also causes Tamaki to realize what Otoha sees in Lilisa: a partner who can stand against her as an equal. Fortunately, the Bitter Ganache members drop the bet upon realizing Tamaki's desire to play bass. Tamaki ultimately decides to join the band, deriving pleasure from being trash-talked by Otoha, much to the latter's bewilderment. The next day, Lilisa attends a joint tea ceremony between Oshin and its sister academy—Kuroyuri Girls' School—and is shocked to see Tamaki is the president of Kuroyuri's tea ceremony club, putting on the facade of a traditional Japanese maiden. After school, Lilisa reflects on the previous night's performance and realizes she had genuine fun. She then arrives at the music room to find Otoha, Tina, and Tamaki waiting for her for their next session. Outside, Alice spies on Lilisa and is shocked to see that she has a full band now.
11	"I Want to be the Noble Maiden"; Transliteration: "Nōburumeiden ni Narita Kute" (Japanese: 高潔な乙女(ノーブルメイデン)になりたくて)	Komao Yukihiro	Komao Yukihiro	June 12, 2025
11	"It Lets You Dance All Over Them"; Transliteration: "Ta da, Odora seru Dake" (Japanese: ただ、踊らせるだけ)	Komao Yukihiro	Komao Yukihiro	June 12, 2025
The band continues to practice together, with Tamaki eventually coming to accept Tina as a bandmate while helping train Lilisa's guitar skills. Meanwhile, Lilisa continues to pour all her efforts into becoming the Noble Maiden, concentrating on her schoolwork and student council duties. Lilisa later has a chance encounter with Oshin Academy alumna and previous Noble Maiden Yayoi Takayanagi. Hoping to learn more about how to become a Noble Maiden, Lilisa agrees to accompany Yayoi and asks how she can contribute to the school, but is disheartened to hear that Yayoi considers monetary value as a contribution. Lilisa is further shocked to hear Yayoi deride the guitar despite Yayoi's past as a harpist, remarking it serves no purpose with high society and telling Lilisa to moderate it. Lilisa, who considers the guitar a core part of her identity, returns to the music room to vent her anger and frustrations through her guitar. The next day, the band is invited by the live hall owner to return for a repeat performance due to popular demand.
12	"I Will Bow Out of Playing"; Transliteration: "Jitai Sasete Itadakimasu wa" (Japanese: 辞退させていただきますわ)	Takahiko Kyogoku	Takahiko Kyogoku	June 19, 2025
12	"We'll Prove We're the Best!"; Transliteration: "Saikō Datte Shōmei Shite Yaru!!!" (Japanese: 最高だって証明してやる!!!)	Takahiko Kyogoku	Takahiko Kyogoku	June 19, 2025
Lilisa and the band agree to play again, under the live hall owner's condition that they participate in another battle of the bands. The all-boy band Bacchus then arrives, looking to perform at the live hall and agree to face off against Lilisa's band. However, Lilisa is privately angered at Bacchus' low level of skill and having picked up rock music on a whim rather than out of any true passion, and are only popular due to being already successful MeTubers. Tamaki warns Lilisa that their band is already at a disadvantage due to Bacchus having a vocalist, and their fans being loyal due to Bacchus' looks rather than their music. Otoha considers withdrawing from the performance since she only wants to play as a hobby, but Lilisa tells her that she genuinely wants the band to succeed, and promises to give a performance that will impress her. On the day of the performance, Lilisa defends Alice from Bacchus when they harass her for criticizing them. On stage, the band faces Bacchus' hostile and fiercely loyal fans, but Lilisa is determined to steal them with her performance.
13	"Rock Lady"; Transliteration: "Rokkuredi" (Japanese: ロックレディ)	Ōri Yasukawa & Shinya Watada	Yasufumi Soejima, Ōri Yasukawa, & Shinya Watada	June 26, 2025
Lilisa and the band, now going by the name Rock Lady, begin their performance and gradually win over Bacchus' fans despite the fans' repeated attempts to ignore them. However, Otoha remains unsatisfied due to her perception of their band only playing music to please others. Lilisa snaps her out and commands her to play for her own happiness and passion, further amplified when Otoha sees the fans enjoying their performance. After finishing, they are confronted by Bacchus, who quit midperformance upon seeing their fans discuss Rock Lady's set. The band calls Bacchus out on their cowardice and refusal to accept failure. Bacchus attempts to resort to violence and intimidation, forcing the live hall owner to intervene and kick them out; the live hall owner also tells Rock Lady that the audience is anticipating their encore performance, and Rock Lady accepts. Otoha later asks Lilisa on her insistence for Rock Lady to continue as an instrumental rock band, and Lilisa remarks she wants people to experience the exhilaration of instrumental rock, strengthening Otoha's resolve to stay with Rock Lady as Lilisa plans they will continue their goal towards Fuji Rock.

=== Stage play ===
A stage play adaptation is set to premiere in February 2027.

== Reception ==
The manga was recommended by Bocchi the Rock! author Aki Hamaji. The anime adaptation was received positively. Vrai Kaiser of Anime Feminist said the series offered "two different variations" of a "two-faced femme" character, comparing it to Anthy Himemiya in Revolutionary Girl Utena, Jennifer Tilly, and Hime Shiraki in Yuri Is My Job!, adding that although the twintails of Lilisa were embarrassing in terms of design, they were used expressively, and noted that the series' staff came from Love Live, Jojo’s Bizarre Adventure, SSSS.Dynazenon, and Keijo!!!!!!!!. Kaiser said that although the end results were not "camp," nor were they like BanG Dream! Ave Mujica, it was a form of "friendly...chaos" which was not an issue to watch, combined with "class anxiety and societal sexism," said the dynamic between the two protagonists was "electric," and said that they expected that the "One Season Yuri curse will rear its head" before the protagonists were together, romantically.

Steve Jones reviewed the first three episodes of the anime for Anime News Network. He noted that although he was a fan of girls band series like Bocchi the Rock!, BanG Dream! It's MyGO!!!!! and Ave Mujica, he was skeptical of the series, thinking it would be a comedy, but was proven wrong, saying the series "kicks ass," saying that Lilisa's story made the story work, serving as a character which was "instantly likable" and who was worn by her performance in this high society and Class S academy, but was trapped in the web that Otoha spun, and praised the storyboarding, music, color choices, imagery, and animation. He argued that the story had seduction at its heart, with imagined BDSM scenarios with either Lilisa or Otoha as the dominatrix and called the series "loud, vulgar, sapphic, and proud" and a story of "liberation and libidos," with allusions to sexual intercourse, and compared the series to Kakegurui.

Erica Friedman noted in her review of the first two episodes of the anime that many early yuri series took place in "private schools for young women from the upper classes" so that they are in a place, time, or status "unreachable by the average reader," allowing exploration "outside the mores of Japanese society," and said that this series embodied that idea, with Lilisa having a facade which made her seem graceful and refined, as does Otoha, with both "competing...for supremacy in music," attempting to dominate one another in a music room that has been abandoned. She noted that while she was disappointed by some music in the girls band stories of the past year, Band-Maid had music which fit the story, and music scenes were animated using CGI which allowed viewers to "see them playing is what is being played," and noted that she liked the series mix of a Class S school, "commoner sensibility," yuri service, and rock and roll. She concluded by rating the art as 7/10, story as 9/10, characters as 9/10, yuri as 4/10, overall as 9/10, and said for fan service, "Otoha does it all on purpose."

== See also ==
- Mushibugyō, another manga series by the same author
- 5-fungo no Sekai, another manga series by the same author
