= The Black Museum (manga) =

Japanese manga series by Kazuhiro Fujita

- The Black Museum: Springald cover

黒博物館 (Kuro Hakubutsukan)
- Genre: Dark fantasy; Historical fantasy
- Manga

Springald
- Written by: Kazuhiro Fujita
- Published by: Kodansha
- Magazine: Morning
- Original run: May 10, 2007 – August 2, 2007
- Volumes: 1
- Manga

The Ghost and the Lady
- Written by: Kazuhiro Fujita
- Published by: Kodansha
- English publisher: NA: Kodansha USA
- Magazine: Morning
- Original run: November 27, 2014 – June 25, 2015
- Volumes: 2
- Manga

Mikazuki Yo, Kaibutsu to Odore
- Written by: Kazuhiro Fujita
- Published by: Kodansha
- Magazine: Morning
- Original run: March 10, 2022 – September 14, 2023
- Volumes: 6
- icon

The Black Museum (Japanese: 黒博物館, Hepburn: Kuro Hakubutsukan) is a Japanese manga series written and illustrated by Kazuhiro Fujita. It is an anthology of dark fantasy stories in a British setting, serialized in Kodansha's seinen manga magazine Morning. Two stories, Springald and Springald Ibun: Mother Goose, were published from May to August 2007, and collected in a single tankōbon volume. Another story, The Ghost and the Lady, was published from November 2014 to June 2015, and collected in two volumes. A third story, Mikazuki Yo, Kaibutsu to Odore, was published from March 2022 to September 2023, and collected in six volumes. In North America, Kodansha USA licensed The Black Museum: The Ghost and the Lady for English language release.

== Media ==
=== Manga ===
The Black Museum is written and illustrated by Kazuhiro Fujita. It is the second serialized work by Fujita published in a seinen manga magazine. Fujita published two stories, Springald (スプリンガルド, Supuringarudo) and Springald Ibun: Mother Goose (スプリンガルド異聞マザア・グウス, Supuringarudo Ibun Mazaa Guusu), serialized in Kodansha's Morning from May 10 to August 2, 2007. Kodansha collected the two stories in a single tankōbon volumes, released on September 21, 2007.

Fujita launched another story, The Ghost and The Lady (ゴースト アンド レデ, Gōsuto ando Redi), serialized in Morning from November 27, 2014, to June 25, 2015. Kodansha collected the story in two tankōbon volumes, published on July 23, 2015.

A one-shot story, subtitled "Candy Cane" (キャンディ ケイン, Kyandi Kein), was published in Morning on December 14, 2017, as part of the "Carnaval" one-shot stories project to commemorate the magazine's 35th anniversary.

A third series, Mikazuki Yo, Kaibutsu to Odore (三日月よ、怪物と踊れ; "Crescent Moon, Dance with the Monster"), was serialized in Morning from March 10, 2022, to September 14, 2023. Kodansha collected its chapters in six tankōbon volumes, released from July 22, 2022, to October 23, 2023.

In North America, Kodansha USA announced the license of The Ghost and the Lady manga in March 2016. The first volume was released on October 25 and the second on December 27, 2016.

==== Springald ====
No.	Release date	ISBN
1	September 21, 2007	978-4-06-372630-5
1. "The Appearance of Spring-heeled Jack" (バネ足男の登場, Bane Ashi Otoko no Tōjō); 2. "The Identity of Spring-heeled Jack" (バネ足男の正体, Bane Ashi Otoko no Shōtai); 3. "The Terror of Spring-heeled Jack" (バネ足男の驚愕, Bane Ashi Otoko no Kyōgaku); 4. "The Reminiscence of Spring-heeled Jack" (バネ足男の思い出, Bane Ashi Otoko no Omoide); 5. "The Battle of Spring-heeled Jack" (バネ足男の退場, Bane Ashi Otoko no Tatakai); 6. "The Departure of Spring-heeled Jack" (バネ足男の戦い, Bane Ashi Otoko no Taijō); 7. "Springald Ibun: Mother Goose (1)" (スプリンガルド異聞 マザア・グウス 前編, Supuringarudo Ibun Mazaa Guusu Zenpen); 8. "Springald Ibun: Mother Goose (2)" (スプリンガルド異聞 マザア・グウス 中編, Supuringarudo Ibun Mazaa Guusu Chūhen); 9. "Springald Ibun: Mother Goose (3)" (スプリンガルド異聞 マザア・グウス 後編, Supuringarudo Ibun Mazaa Guusu Kōhen)

==== The Ghost and the Lady ====
No.	Original release date	Original ISBN	English release date	English ISBN
1	July 23, 2015	978-4-09-185678-4	October 25, 2016	978-4-06-388477-7
1. "The Ghost Meets the Lady" (ゴースト レディと会う, Gōsuto Redi to Au); 2. "The Ghost Listens to the Lady" (ゴースト レディの話を聞く, Gōsuto Redi no Hanashiwokiku); 3. "The Ghost is Taken by the Lady's First Performance" (ゴースト レディの初演に見とれる, Gōsuto Redi no Shoen ni Mitoreru); 4. "The Ghost Trembles and the Lady Illuminates" (ゴーストは震え レディは灯す, Gōsuto wa Furue Redi wa Tomosu); 5. "The Ghost Goes to the Lady's Hospital" (ゴースト レディの病院を行く, Gōsuto Redi no Byōin o Iku); 6. "The Ghost Goes to the Battlefield with the Lady" (ゴースト レディと戦場へ行く, Gōsuto Redi to Senjō e Iku); 7. "The Ghost Hears the Lady Take a Stand" (ゴースト レディの初名乗りを聞く, Gōsuto Redi no Hatsu Nanori o Kiku); 8. "The Ghost Waits for the Lady's Scene" (ゴースト レディの見せ場を待つ, Gōsuto Redi no Miseba o Matsu); 9. "The Ghost Sees the Lady Go to War" (ゴースト レディの開戦を見る, Gōsuto Redi no Kaisen o Miru); 10. "The Ghost and the Lady Meet d'Ēon" (ゴーストとレディ デオンに出会う, Gōsuto to Redi Deon ni Deau); 11. "The Lady Witnesses the Ghost's Clash" (レディ ゴーストの剣戟を目撃する, Redi Gōsuto no Kengeki o Mokugeki Suru); 12. "The Ghost Tells the Lady His Story" (ゴースト レディに身の上話を語る, Gōsuto Redi ni Minoue-banashi o Kataru); 13. "The Lady Hears of the Ghost's Death" (レディ ゴーストの死に様を聞く, Redi Gōsuto no Shinizama o Kiku)
2	July 23, 2015	978-4-06-388478-4	December 27, 2016	978-1-64505-864-9
14. "The Lady Declares That No One Shall Die Alone" (孤りでは死なせないとレディは言った, Koride wa Shina Senaito Redi wa Itta); 15. "The Ghost Educates the Lady" (ゴースト レディに教育をする, Gōsuto Redi ni Kyōiku o Suru); 16. "The Ghost and the Lady's Respective Roles" (ゴーストとレディ それぞれの演目, Gōsuto to Redi Sorezore no Enmoku); 17. "The Lady Receives a Kiss in the Shadows, the Ghost Plots" (レディは影にキスを受け ゴーストは企む, Redi wa Kage ni Kisu o Uke Gōsuto wa Takuramu); 18. "The Lady Fights Alone" (レディは孤りで戦った, Redi wa Koride Tatakatta); 19. "The Lady Obtains a Cook and Heads for Crimea" (レディは料理人を得てクリミアに向かう, Redi wa Ryōri Hito o ete Kurimia ni Mukau); 20. "The Ghost Strikes a Blow, and the Lady is Deeply Wounded" (ゴーストは一撃し レディは深く傷を負う, Gōsuto wa Ichigeki Shi Redi wa Fukaku Kizu o Ou); 21. "The Ghost Nurses the Lady" (ゴースト レディを看護する, Gōsuto Redi o Kango Suru); 22. "The Ghost and the Lady's Final Story —The Omen—" (ゴーストとレディ 最後のお話 ～前兆～, Gōsuto to Redi Saigo no Ohanashi ~Zenchō~); 23. "The Ghost and the Lady's Final Story —Shots Fired—" (ゴーストとレディ 最後のお話 ～火蓋は切られた～, Gōsuto to Redi Saigo no Ohanashi ~Hibuta wa Kira Reta~); 24. "The Ghost and the Lady's Final Story —Duel in Crimes—" (ゴーストとレディ 最後のお話 ～クリミアの決闘～, Gōsuto to Redi Saigo no Ohanashi ~Kurimia no Kettō~); 25. "The Ghost and the Lady's Final Story —A Conversation Between Blade and Bullet—" (ゴーストとレディ 最後のお話 ～刃と弾丸の会話～, Gōsuto to Redi Saigo no Ohanashi ~Ha to Dangan no Kaiwa~); 26. "The Ghost and the Lady's Final Story —The Final Enemy—" (ゴーストとレディ 最後のお話 ～最後の敵～, Gōsuto to Redi Saigo no Ohanashi ~Saigo no Teki~); 27. "The Ghost and the Lady's Final Story —The Showdown—" (ゴーストとレディ 最後のお話 ～決着～, Gōsuto to Redi Saigo no Ohanashi ~Ketchaku~); 28. "Four Somethings" (サムシング・フォー, Samushingu Fō)

==== Mikazuki Yo, Kaibutsu to Odore ====
No.	Release date	ISBN
1	July 22, 2022	978-4-06-528312-7
2	November 22, 2022	978-4-06-529660-8
3	March 23, 2023	978-4-06-530894-3
4	June 22, 2023	978-4-06-532016-7
5	September 22, 2023	978-4-06-532866-8
6	October 23, 2023	978-4-06-533343-3

=== Stage play ===
In April 2023, it was announced that The Ghost and the Lady would receive a stage musical adaptation. It was directed by Scott Schwartz, with Chikae Takahashi writing the script and lyrics, Harumi Fūki in charge of composition and arrangement, and Megumi Chinju serving as musical director. It ran at the Autumn Theater in the JR East Shiki Theater in Tokyo from May 6 to November 11, 2024. Musical magazine ranked it as the best musical of 2024.

== Reception ==
The Black Museum: The Ghost and the Lady placed third on Takarajimasha's Kono Manga ga Sugoi! 2016 ranking of top 20 manga for male readers.
