= Mushibugyō =

Japanese manga series

- First tankōbon volume cover

ムシブギョー (Mushibugyō)
- Genre: Action; Fantasy; Samurai
- Manga
- Written by: Hiroshi Fukuda
- Published by: Shogakukan
- Imprint: Shōnen Sunday Comics
- Magazine: Shōnen Sunday Super
- Original run: August 25, 2009 – September 25, 2010
- Volumes: 3
- Manga

Jōjū Senjin!! Mushibugyō
- Written by: Hiroshi Fukuda
- Published by: Shogakukan
- Imprint: Shōnen Sunday Comics
- Magazine: Weekly Shōnen Sunday
- Original run: January 4, 2011 – September 20, 2017
- Volumes: 32
- Anime television series
- Directed by: Takayuki Hamana
- Produced by: Makoto Hijikata; Makoto Furukawa
- Written by: Yōichi Katō
- Music by: Tetsurō Oda
- Studio: Seven Arcs Pictures
- Licensed by: Sentai Filmworks
- Original network: TXN (TV Tokyo)
- English network: SEA: Animax Asia
- Original run: April 8, 2013 – September 30, 2013
- Episodes: 26
- Video game
- Developer: Namco Bandai Games
- Publisher: Namco Bandai Games
- Genre: Action RPG
- Platform: Nintendo 3DS
- Released: JP: September 19, 2013
- Original video animation
- Directed by: Takayuki Hamana
- Produced by: Shinpei Mutō; Masayoshi Yokoyama; Tomokazu Iizumi (2–3)
- Written by: Yōichi Katō
- Music by: Tetsurō Oda
- Studio: Seven Arcs Pictures
- Licensed by: Sentai Filmworks
- Released: July 18, 2014 – January 16, 2015
- Runtime: 24 minutes
- Episodes: 3
- icon

Mushibugyō (ムシブギョー) is a Japanese manga series written and illustrated by Hiroshi Fukuda. It was serialized in Shogakukan's Shōnen Sunday Super from August 2009 to September 2010, with its chapters collected in three tankōbon volumes. A second series, Jōjū Senjin!! Mushibugyō, a retelling of the original series, was serialized in Weekly Shōnen Sunday from January 2011 to September 2017, with its chapters collected in 32 tankōbon volumes.

A 26-episode anime television series adaptation produced by Seven Arcs Pictures was broadcast in Japan on TV Tokyo from April to September 2013, with three additional original video animation (OVA) episodes released in 2014 and 2015.

== Plot ==
Mushibugyō is set in an alternate Edo period of Japan, where giant insects known as "Mushi" began to appear and attack people 100 years before, and since then have brought terror and death to the country. To counter the threat of the Mushi, the Shogunate establishes the City Patrol who acts under the Mushi Magistrate (Mushi-bugyō) to assemble warriors strong enough to fight them. The story follows Jinbei Tsukishima, a young and cheerful samurai who is the newest member of the City Patrol answering a summons to his father by the Magistrate, but as he is not able to fight anymore, Jinbei takes on the burden of protecting Edo from the Mushi in his place.

== Characters ==
Jinbei Tsukishima (月島仁兵衛, Tsukishima Jinbei)
Voiced by: Kenn
A young samurai and the newest member of the City Patrol. The son of a samurai who was forced to cut off his own leg in repentance for an incident involving Jinbei and the son of his master, despite not being at fault. When his father is summoned to join Mushibugyō, Jinbei departs for Edo to join the magistrate in his place to make up for his sacrifice and to help restore honor to his family. Despite being far stronger than a normal human, Jinbei is the weakest member of the team, making up for his inexperience with determination and an unyielding spirit that ends up earning him the respect and admiration of his peers. In the last chapter of the manga it is revealed that Jinbei ended up marrying Kuroageha, Oharu and Hibachi ending up with nine children.
Hibachi (火鉢)
Voiced by: Rumi Ōkubo
A female ninja who specializes in the use of explosives, Hibachi's determined to prove her worth as the successor of her grandfather's techniques, despite the fact that he does not accept them being inherited by a woman. She admired Mugai greatly, but might have developed feelings for Jinbei too, as shown in Episode 15 where she showed hidden jealousy at the idea of him marrying Oharu. She married Jinbei and together they had three children.
Mugai (無涯)
Voiced by: Takuma Terashima
The strongest warrior of the City Patrol, Mugai is a swordsman capable of feats that seem impossible for a human (fittingly, his name means "Limitless"). Mugai was once the leader of a group called the Mushigari (or the "Insects Hunters"), but for some reason he abandoned it to join the magistrate. Both Jinbei and Hibachi look up to him and dream of one day being as strong as him to repay the several occasions on which he saved their lives. He seems to be emotionless and ruthless on the surface, but his actions suggest otherwise. His sword is as big as his whole body and has the ability to absorb insects and imitate their abilities.
Shungiku Koikawa (恋川春菊, Koikawa Shungiku)
Voiced by: Takuya Eguchi
A man covered in scars known as the "Killer of 99". Koikawa is a convicted murderer who joins the City Patrol in an act of repentance. The son of a bandit, he tried to avoid a life of crime until his mother was murdered and (blaming his father for it) goes on a killing frenzy, slaying his entire gang as well as anyone else that got in his way until finally facing his father, who begs him for mercy. At this moment, Koikawa learns that his mother died by the hands of a member of the Mushigari. Since then, he has looked for his mother's killer and, after finally avenging her, Shungiku changes his title to the "Killer of 100".
Tenma Ichinotani (一乃谷天間, Ichinotani Tenma)
Voiced by: Yū Serizawa
The youngest member of the team, Tenma is an onmyōji capable of summoning two powerful shikigami familiars contained in paper dolls that can enlarge themselves to giant size and deal powerful blows. He is afraid of many things, mostly crawling bugs but he has a strong will and always does his best and eventually gets over his fear.
Kotori Matsunohara (松ノ原小鳥, Matsunohara Kotori)
Voiced by: Mamoru Miyano
The commander of the City Patrol who answers directly to the Magistrate herself. His skills and abilities are a mystery until he uses them on a member of the Mushigari, who is found killed by a powerful sword blow. Though he does not often go into the field with the patrol, his position as commander suggests great skill.
Oharu (お春)
Voiced by: Satomi Akesaka
A young lady whose family owns a restaurant. She is the first person who greets Jinbei when he arrives in Edo and ever since he saved her life, she has held affection for him. Later on in the series, she marries Jinbei and they have three children.
Nagatomimaru (長福丸)
Voiced by: Jun Fukuyama
A masked bookworm who lost his faith in people and dedicated his life to the pursuit of knowledge. He befriends Jinbei after his failed attempt to infiltrate the Magistrate to have access to its documents as he seems to be the only person who respects his wisdom. He is actually Ieshige Tokugawa, the son of the Shogun and the first in the line of succession, a fact that is kept a secret from Jinbei and almost everyone else.
Kuroageha (黒揚羽)
Voiced by: Megumi Han
The mysterious Magistrate of the Mushibugyō, whose body can produce a deadly poison capable of killing any living being who touches her skin. When using her powers to the fullest, she manifests giant butterfly-like wings, hence her alias of "Black butterfly". She is the main enemy of the Mushigari, who seeks to kill her at all costs. Jinbei befriends her unaware of her true identity and she eventually develops feelings for him. Later on in the series she became one of Jinbei's wives; together they have three children.

== Media ==
=== Manga ===
Written and illustrated by Hiroshi Fukuda, Mushibugyō was serialized in Shogakukan's shōnen manga magazine Shōnen Sunday Super's from August 25, 2009, to September 25, 2010. Three tankōbon volumes were released by Shogakukan between April 16, 2010, and January 18, 2011.

A second series, Jōjū Senjin!! Mushibugyō (常住戦陣！！ムシブギョー), a retelling of the original series, was serialized in Weekly Shōnen Sunday from January 4, 2011, to September 20, 2017. The 316 chapters were collected in 32 tankōbon volumes, released from June 17, 2011, to October 18, 2017.

=== Anime ===
An anime television series was announced in January 2013. The series, directed by Takayuki Hamana and produced by Seven Arcs Pictures, aired on TX Network stations from April 8 to September 30, 2013, for 26 episodes. The series was simulcast on Crunchyroll. Three additional original video animation (OVA) episodes were bundled with the 15th, 16th and 17th volumes of the manga on July 18, 2014, October 7, 2014, and January 16, 2015. Sentai Filmworks licensed the series and OVAs and released them in 2022.

The series uses four pieces of theme music. The two opening themes are "Tomoyo" by Gagaga SP and "Denshin∞Unchained" by FREE Hebi&M, while the two ending themes are "Ichizu" by i☆Ris and "Through All Eternity" by ayami.

==== Episodes ====
No.	Title	Original release date
1	"Here comes Tsukishima Jinbei!" "Tsukishima Jinbee iza Mairu! ! !" (月島仁兵衛 いざ参る!!!)	April 8, 2013
Tsukishima Jinbei arrives at Edo to answer the summoning of his father by the Mushi Magistrate. However, just before introducing himself to his new co-workers, he must fight to protect his new friend Oharu from one of the Mushi, giant insects that terrorize the country.
2	"My rival is female ninja, Hibachi!" "Raibaru wa jo ninja hibachi!" (ライバルは女忍者 火鉢！)	April 15, 2013
Jinbei is received with a cold shoulder by the other members of the Magistrate, including Hibachi, a female ninja that just like him, dreams to become strong enough to repay Mugai, the strongest of the Magistrate warriors, for saving her life.
3	"The Killer of 99, Koikawa Shungiku" (九十九斬り 恋川春菊！)	April 22, 2013
Koikawa Shungiku, another member of the Magistrate, is accused of murder and despite learning the dark secrets of his past, Jinbei refuses to turn his back on him and looks for a way to prove his innocence.
4	"Ichinotani Tenma! I Can Do It!" (一乃谷天間 僕は出来る子！)	April 29, 2013
Ichinotani Tenma, a powerful Onmyouji and one of the members of the Magistrate, must overcome his fears to save his companions from trouble.
5	"Mugai: What Solitary Eyes See" "Mugai kokō no hitomi ga ou saki wa" (無涯 孤高の瞳が追う先は)	May 6, 2013
Jinbei is called to accompany Mugai in a mission. Despite the young samurai is in awe with the chance to work with him, Mugai claims that he does not expect results from him at all, until Jinbei proves himself wrong.
6	"The Hot Guy Beneath the Mask: Nagatomimaru" "O-men no shita no ikemen-chō Fukumaru" (お面の下のイケメン 長福丸)	May 13, 2013
Nagatomimaru, a mysterious individual, sneaks inside the Magistrate grounds to access the secret documents storaged there. After he is caught, Jinbei is instructed to keep him out of the premises, and they end up becoming friends after Jinbei makes use of Nagatomimaru's vast knowledge to face a powerful enemy.
7	"Summer War in Edo!!" "Hana no oedo no natsu no jin! !" (花のお江戸の夏の陣！！)	May 20, 2013
A giant Mushi appears in Edo. However, the citizens do not seem scared by such monster, but looking forward to see Mugai's battle with it, while Jinbei stays behind at the Magistrate and befriends a mysterious girl he meets there.
8	"Mitsuki's Honey Trap" "Mitsugetsu no o iroke ♥ dai sakusen" (蜜月のお色気♥大作戦)	May 27, 2013
Mitsuki, a member of Mugai's former group, the Mushikari, tries to seduce Jinbei in order to learn the secrets of the Magistrate, but it does not take long for her to find out why Mugai was not worried about it at all.
9	"The Insect Hunters Attack!! Battle of Hachijo" "Kyōshū! ! Hachijōjima no hen! !" (蟲狩強襲！！八丈島の変！！)	June 3, 2013
The members of the Mushi Magistrate learn that their leader is in danger as her stronghold on Hachijō Island is targeted by Mushikari, just as Edo is attacked by several Mushi and the warriors must choose between protect the city or leave it defenseless to rescue her.
10	"Kuroageha Arrives" (黒揚羽降臨)	June 10, 2013
Jinbei manages to reach the Mushi Magistrate's mansion ahead of the others, just to meet the same girl he met before, unaware that she is no other than Kuroageha, the Magistrate herself.
11	"Jinbei's Power Awakens!!" (目覚めた力 仁兵衛、覚醒！！)	June 17, 2013
Kuroageha struggles to protect the uncouscious Jinbei from Mushikari's attack, but when all hope seems lost, Jinbei suffers a strange transformation and becomes a powerful creature unable to distinguish friend or foe.
12	"Training With Father! The Thirty-six Blades of Fuji!!" (父との修行! 富嶽三十六剣!!)	June 24, 2013
After returning to Edo, Jinbei is visited by his father and he leaves with him to the top of Mount Fuji to improve himself by learning the first of the 36 secret techniques of his family.
13	"We`ll Show You Everything!! The Edo Women`s Baths!!" (全部見せます!! お江戸の女湯!!)	July 1, 2013
A journalist interviews Oharu and learn from her the exploits of Jinbei and his comrades so far.
14	"Insect!? Man!? A Mysterious Enemy Attacks!" (蟲!? 人!? 謎の敵、襲来!)	July 8, 2013
Jinbei returns from his training just to face a dangerous oponenent, part Mushi, part human. Despite being assisted by Hibachi and the others, Jinbei finds himself in a pinch until he decides to put in practice what he learned from his father.
15	"To Kishuu! The Ten Crucifix Insects of Sanada Appear!" (いざ紀州へ! 真田十傑蟲、現る!)	July 15, 2013
With Kuroageha's powers sealed, the Ten Crucifix Insects of Sanada, a group of powerful mushi-hybrid warriors advance from the west killing everyone at their path. After consulting with Nagatomimaru, the Mushi Magistrate departs to Kishuu to look for a way to regain her powers, accompanied only by Jinbei and one of the Shogun's most trusted retainers - Ooka Echizen.
16	"The Cool Guy in Glasses Lectures on Right and Wrong" "Kūruna megane no ￮ × kōza" (クールなメガネの○×講座)	July 22, 2013
Yukimura Sanada and the Ten Crucifix Insects appear at Kishuu and order the local Shogun to assemble a massive war ship for them. Meanwhile, Jinbei's party finds the path to the city closed and must find a way to bypass the road blocks while evading their enemies.
17	"Sanada Yukimura`s Trap! Caught in a Net!!" "Sanada Yukimura no wana! Otazunemono hōi-mō! !" (真田雪村の罠! お尋ね者包囲網!!)	July 29, 2013
Having learned of their escape, Yukimura Sanada threatens the death of all the people unless the heads of the escaped three are brought to him. Mugai and the others head towards Kishuu. Jinbei's party get caught while passing through a village. Two of the Ten Crucifix Insects arrive there and threaten information from the villagers.
18	"Time`s Up! The Insect Magistrate`s Office Arrives!" "Kokugen no Toki Mushibugyō Tokoro Kenzan!" (刻限の時 蟲奉行所見参!)	August 5, 2013
Jinbei's group and Mugai's group join forces. They break into three groups to execute their plans. Even after their ship is completed, Yukimura Sanada breaks his promise of not killing anyone, saying that the promise of bringing the heads of the three escapees was not completed.
19	"He Shed His Skin!? The Insect-men`s True Form!!" "Masakano Dappi!? Mushibito no Shin no Sugata!!" (まさかの脱皮!? 蟲人の真の姿!!)	August 12, 2013
The Insect Magistrate`s Office (without Mugai and with the Shogun's retainer) challenge Yukimura Sanada, who in turn send out his Crucifix Insects for the challenge. After entering the castle, Jinbei gets separated from the group and end up in a dual with Nedzy Jinpachi. As the rest of the group proceed without Jinbei, they are challenged by where the leader of the Crucifix, Kirigakure Saizou. Jinbei learns the Tsukishima stule Mt Fuji Storm technique and proceeds, only to find Hibachi trapped by Kirigakure Saizou.
20	"Dream of the Butterfly" "Kochō no Yume" (胡蝶の夢)	August 19, 2013
Hibachi struggles to fight against the illusions of Kirigakure Saizou and save Jinbei from them. Meanwhile, the Snow group is progressing towards the well.
21	"The Compassion Slash That Cuts G!!" "G o Kirisaku Megumi Ai Kiri!!" (Gを切り裂く慈合い斬り!!)	August 26, 2013
Koikawa Sungiku fights the ever-re-generating Miyoshi Seikai Nyuudou and Miyoshi Isa Nyuudou.
22	"Who Is Righteous!? Tenma and Justice" "Docchi ga Seigi!? Tenma to Jasutisu" (どっちが正義!? 天間とジャスティス)	September 2, 2013
Tenma fights Anayama "Justice" Kosuke.
23	"My Life`s Greatest Task" "Waga Shōgai de Ichiban no Otsutome" (我が生涯で一番のお勤め)	September 9, 2013
While Tenma, Koikawa and Hibachi are blocked by two more of the Insect Crucifix - Yuri Kamanosuke and Kakei Juuzou, the Snow group reached the well; and Jinbei and Ooka Echizen almost reach Sanada Yukimura. Mugai realizes that Kirigakure Saizou is disguised and present in the Snow group and attacks him. We also see a glance of why Mugai left the Insect Hunters and joined the Mushibugyō. While the fight between Mugai and Saizou continues, Jinbei and Ooka split - Jinbei goes to protect the Insect Magistrate and Ooka to face Sanada Yukimura.
24	"The Insect Magistrate`s Cursed Past" "Mushibugyō Noroiwa Reshi Kako" (蟲奉行 呪われし過去)	September 16, 2013
Mugai easily beats Saizou and sucks his insect power into his blade. Sanada Yukimura requests the Insect Magistrate to come with him to the "King", but she refuses. Jinbei starts fighting him to give the Insect Magistrate time to dip in the poison well, but he is unable to beat him and gets thrown into the well himself. The Insect Magistrate's past is shown and the truth behind the poison well is revealed.
25	"The Promise Is Hope Within Despair" "Kawashita Yakusoku wa Zetsubō no Naka no Kibō" (交わした約束は絶望の中の希望)	September 23, 2013
After hearing the fact that the poison well takes memory in exchange of powers, Jinbei plunges back into the well to save the Insect Magistrate. Mugai continues fighting, but Sanada Yukimura injures him as he tried to allow Jinbei and the Insect Magistrate to escape. As Tenma, Koikawa and Hibachi are still fighting Yuri Kamanosuke and Kakei Juuzou, Kotori, who realizes that there's something else going on, arrives to help. The others leave to help the Insect Magistrate. While the Insect Magistrate, plunges into the well to save Jinbei from being killed by Sanada Yukimura. But after coming out of the well, instead of the Kuro Ageha she is supposed to be (according to Sanada Yukimura), she is still white. As Sanada Yukimura is shocked, Tenma, Koikawa Hibachi, Mugai and Kotori arrive to fight Sanada Yukira.
26	"Tsukishima Jinbei Is Here!!!" "Tsukushima Jinbei Koko ni Ari!!!" (月島仁兵衛 ここにあり!!!)	September 30, 2013
After being stabbed from behind with poison by the Insect Magistrate, Jinbei is gravely injured. He pleads the Insect Magistrate to remember by looking at the sign on her palm "Jin", but she doesn't remember anything. As everyone attempts to attack Sanada Yukimura to stop him from taking the Insect Magistrate away, Jinbei who attacks first is knocked unconscious and the rest are unable to even deal any damage to him. Mugai is able to reveal Sanada Yukimura's power, but he gets caught by the insects that are generated by Sanada Yukimura's black powder. The other side of Jinbei awakens, as he has absorbed the Eternal Insect's power from the well. He cuts the insects which have bound Mugai and Kotori comments that he has the blood of insect hunter in him. As Jinbei struggles with the voices of the Eternal Insect he hears and his sanity, Mugai continues the fight with Sanada Yukimura. Jinbei regains his sanity and confronts the Insect Magistrate as the others fight Sanada Yukimura. Jinbei forces the Insect Magistrate to remember by showing her his own memories with her. Sanada Yukimura, angered that the Insect Magistrate has regained her memories tried to destroy Kishuu, but the Insect Magistrate blocks his attack, which angers him further. Jinbei attacks Sanada Yukimura with various forms of Mt Fuji attacks and finally defeats him. Everyone returns to Edo.
OVA–1	"A Real Samurai" "Hontō no Bushi" (本当の武士)	July 18, 2014
OVA–2	"Koisuru Hibachi" (恋する火鉢)	October 7, 2014
OVA–3	"Academy Mushibugyō" "Gakuen Mushibugyō" (学園ムシブギョー)	January 16, 2015

=== Video game ===
A video game, developed by Namco Bandai Games, was released for the Nintendo 3DS on September 19, 2013. It is an action role-playing game featuring all of the Mushibugyo members as a playable characters.

== See also ==
- 5-fungo no Sekai, another manga series by the same author
- Rock Is a Lady's Modesty, another manga series by the same author
