= Yoake no Ryodan =

Japanese manga series

- Cover of the first tankōbon volume

夜明けの旅団
- Genre: Dark fantasy
- Manga
- Written by: Yukio Katayama
- Published by: Kodansha
- Magazine: Monthly Morning Two
- Original run: March 22, 2018 – January 22, 2020
- Volumes: 4

Yoake no Ryodan (夜明けの旅団; "The Dawn Brigade") is a Japanese manga series written and illustrated by Yukio Katayama. It was serialized in Kodansha's seinen manga magazine Monthly Morning Two from March 2018 to January 2020, with its chapters collected in four tankōbon volumes.

== Publication ==
Written and illustrated by Yukio Katayama, Yoake no Ryodan was serialized in Kodansha's seinen manga magazine Monthly Morning Two from March 22, 2018, to January 22, 2020. Kodansha collected its chapters in four tankōbon volumes, released from August 23, 2018, to March 23, 2020.

=== Volumes ===
No.	Release date	ISBN
1	August 23, 2018	978-4-06-512273-0
2	February 22, 2019	978-4-06-514638-5
3	August 23, 2019	978-4-06-516895-0
4	March 23, 2020	978-4-06-518859-0

== See also ==
- Hanamote Katare, another manga series by the same author
- Furo Girl!, another manga series by the same author
