= 5-fungo no Sekai =

Japanese manga series

- First tankōbon volume cover

5分後の世界
- Genre: Dark fantasy; Science fiction; Suspense
- Manga
- Written by: Hiroshi Fukuda
- Published by: Shogakukan
- Imprint: Shōnen Sunday Comics
- Magazine: Weekly Shōnen Sunday
- Original run: April 25, 2018 – September 11, 2019
- Volumes: 7
- icon

5-fungo no Sekai (5分後の世界; "The World After Five Minutes") is a Japanese manga series written and illustrated by Hiroshi Fukuda. It was serialized in Shogakukan's shōnen manga magazine Weekly Shōnen Sunday from April 2018 to September 2019, with its chapters collected in seven tankōbon volumes.

== Plot ==
The story follows twin brothers Yamato and Yūto Shiroaya and their childhood friend Michiru Iguro. Yamato obtains a mysterious bracelet from a fortune teller that enables one-way time travel to the future with a single return option to the present. When Yamato tests the device, he arrives in a future only five minutes ahead of his original timeline, where mobile Buddhist statues are destroying the city and slaughtering civilians. During the chaos, Michiru dies while protecting Yamato, but not before urging him to investigate the statues' origins and weaknesses to prevent the catastrophe.

Yamato and Yūto join survivors in researching the statues, but conventional military forces prove ineffective against them. The situation escalates until the appearance of Jirō Fuyukawa, a man wielding unexplained powers capable of destroying the statues. Jirō reveals he possesses an ability called "Odo Genius" from having previously time traveled himself to fight the statues. He transfers this power to Yamato, who prepares to confront the lead statue, Aizen Myōō, in an attempt to alter the timeline within the critical five-minute window.

== Publication ==
Written and illustrated by Hiroshi Fukuda, 5-fungo no Sekai was serialized in Shogakukan's shōnen manga magazine Weekly Shōnen Sunday from April 25, 2018, to September 11, 2019. Shogakukan collected its 66 chapters in seven tankōbon volumes, released from September 18, 2018, to November 11, 2019.

=== Volumes ===
No.	Japanese release date	Japanese ISBN
1	September 18, 2018	978-4-09-128399-3
2	November 16, 2018	978-4-09-128575-1
3	January 18, 2019	978-4-09-128779-3
4	April 18, 2019	978-4-09-129136-3
5	July 18, 2019	978-4-09-129300-8
6	October 18, 2019	978-4-09-129432-6
7	November 18, 2019	978-4-09-129438-8

== See also ==
- Mushibugyō, another manga series by the same author
- Rock Is a Lady's Modesty, another manga series by the same author
