= Hanamote Katare =

Japanese manga series

- First tankōbon volume cover

花もて語れ
- Genre: Iyashikei
- Manga
- Written by: Yukio Katayama; Momoji Higashi (cooperation)
- Illustrated by: Yukio Katayama
- Published by: Shogakukan
- Magazine: Monthly Big Comic Spirits (2010–2011); Weekly Big Comic Spirits (2012–2014)
- Original run: January 27, 2010 – July 28, 2014
- Volumes: 13
- icon

Hanamote Katare (花もて語れ; lit. 'Speak Through Flowers') is a Japanese manga series written and illustrated by Yukio Katayama, with collaboration of Momoji Higashi. It was serialized in Shogakukan's seinen manga magazine Monthly Big Comic Spirits (2010–11) and Weekly Big Comic Spirits (2012–14), with its chapters collected in thirteen tankōbon volumes.

== Synopsis ==
Hana Sakura (佐倉 ハナ, Sakura Hana) is a girl who enjoys gazing at clouds and losing herself in daydreams. After the death of her parents, she is taken in by her aunt Haruka Sakura (佐倉 遥, Sakura Haruka), who lives in the countryside. However, Hana is shy and soft-spoken, and the local dialect further isolates her, making it difficult for her to communicate properly. One day, she encounters a young man named Shuji Origuchi (折口 柊二, Origuchi Shūji), who reads aloud from a book inside a tent. He later appears at her school as a student teacher. When Hana is assigned the role of narrator for the school's cultural festival, she hesitates. Origuchi, however, recognizes her talent for reading aloud and begins to coach her.

Years later, at age twenty-two, Hana has drifted away from reading aloud and moves to Tokyo, where she takes a job at Moon River Coffee. Still timid and frequently scolded for her quiet voice, she discovers a reading-aloud workshop run by Kinari Fujiiro (藤色 きなり, Fujiro Kinari). One day, Hana is brought by the head of human resources to meet Sasaki (佐左木), the president of the major family-restaurant chain, Redberry. His daughter, Mariko Sasaki (佐左木 満里子, Sasaki Mariko), has been withdrawn since her senior year of university, and he asks Hana to use reading aloud to befriend her and draw her out. Following Kinari's guidance, Hana visits Mariko and recites Kenji Miyazawa's Yamanashi, which moves Mariko deeply. Realizing her own passion for reading aloud, Hana joins Kinari's workshop alongside Mariko. There, she learns that Origuchi, the man she met in elementary school, is a senior disciple in the same workshop.

== Publication ==
Written and illustrated by Yukio Katayama, with original concept and cooperation by Momoji Higashi, was serialized in Shogakukan's seinen manga magazine Monthly Big Comic Spirits from January 27, 2010, to December 27, 2011. The manga was later transferred to Weekly Big Comic Spirits, where it ran from May 14, 2012, to July 28, 2014. Shogakukan collected its chapters in thirteen tankōbon volumes, released from September 30, 2010, to September 30, 2014.

=== Volumes ===
No.	Japanese release date	Japanese ISBN
1	September 30, 2010	978-4-09-183398-3
2	March 30, 2011	978-4-09-183789-9
3	September 30, 2011	978-4-09-184105-6
4	March 30, 2012	978-4-09-184419-4
5	August 30, 2012	978-4-09-184709-6
6	November 30, 2012	978-4-09-184826-0
7	February 28, 2013	978-4-09-185089-8
8	May 30, 2013	978-4-09-185301-1
9	August 30, 2013	978-4-09-185475-9
10	November 29, 2013	978-4-09-185725-5
11	February 28, 2013	978-4-09-186087-3
12	June 30, 2014	978-4-09-186282-2
13	September 30, 2014	978-4-09-186283-9

== Reception ==
Hanamote Katare ranked eighteenth on Takarajimasha's Kono Manga ga Sugoi! list of best manga of 2011 for male readers. It was one of the Jury Recommended Works at the eighteenth Japan Media Arts Festival in 2014.

== See also ==
- Furo Girl!, another manga series by the same author
- Yoake no Ryodan, another manga series by the same author
