= List of Ushio & Tora episodes =

Key visual for the series

Ushio & Tora is a Japanese anime television series, based on the manga series of the same name by Kazuhiro Fujita. The anime series was produced by MAPPA and Studio VOLN. It was directed by Satoshi Nishimura and written by Toshiki Inoue and Kazuhiro Fujita, featuring character designs by Tomoko Mori and music by Eishi Segawa. The anime was split into two parts: the first part (episodes 1–26) aired between July 3 and December 25, 2015, and the second part (episodes 27–39) aired between April 1 and June 24, 2016. It has been licensed for a UK release by Manga Entertainment. For the first part, the opening theme is "Mazeru no Kiken" (混ぜるな危険, Mixing Danger) by Kinniku Shōjo Tai, while the ending themes are "Hero" by Sonar Pocket and "Makeruna Chiisaki Mono Yo" (負けるな小さきものよ, lit. Don't Lose the Small Things) by Wakadanna. For the second part, the opening theme is "Shuugawari no Kiseki no Shinwa" (週替わりの奇跡の神話) by Kinniku Shōjo Tai and the ending theme is "Kessen Zen'ya" (決戦前夜, lit. The Night Before the Decisive Battle) by Lunkhead.

== Episodes ==
No.	Title	Directed by (Note: Information is taken from the ending credits of each episode.)	Written by	Original release date
Part 1
1	"The Fateful Meeting of Ushio and Tora"; Transliteration: "Ushio to Tora Deau no En" (Japanese: うしおととらであうの縁)	Masaki Matsumura	Toshiki Inoue	July 3, 2015
2	"The Stone Eater"; Transliteration: "Ishikui" (Japanese: 石喰い)	Junichi Fujise	Toshiki Inoue	July 10, 2015
3	"The Demon That Dwells in the Painting"; Transliteration: "E ni Sumu Oni" (Japanese: 絵に棲む鬼)	Hiroshi Kōjina	Toshiki Inoue	July 17, 2015
4	"Tora Goes to the City"; Transliteration: "Tora Machi e Yuku" (Japanese: とら街へゆく)	Tomoya Tanaka	Toshiki Inoue	July 24, 2015
5	"Exorcist Hyou"; Transliteration: "Fujushi Hyō" (Japanese: 符咒師 鏢)	Daisuke Yoshida	Toshiki Inoue	July 31, 2015
6	"Spectral Sea"; Transliteration: "Ayakashi no Umi" (Japanese: あやかしの海)	Masaki Matsumura	Toshiki Inoue	August 7, 2015
7	"Folklore"; Transliteration: "Denshō" (Japanese: 伝承)	Junichi Fujise	Toshiki Inoue	August 14, 2015
8	"He's in the Sky"; Transliteration: "Yatsu wa Sora ni Iru" (Japanese: ヤツは空にいる)	Shun Kudō	Toshiki Inoue	August 21, 2015
9	"Mad Wind"; Transliteration: "Kaze Kurui" (Japanese: 風狂い)	Hiroshi Kōjina	Toshiki Inoue	August 28, 2015
10	"The House Where the Kappa Lives"; Transliteration: "Kappa no Iru Ie" (Japanese: 童のいる家)	Tomoya Tanaka	Shōji Yonemura	September 4, 2015
11	"Mirror of a Single Strike"; Transliteration: "Ichigeki no Kagami" (Japanese: 一撃の鏡)	Daisuke Yoshida	Shōji Yonemura	September 11, 2015
12	"The Road to the Touno Youkai Battle (Part 1)"; Transliteration: "Tōno Yōkai-sen Michiyuki ~Sono Ichi~" (Japanese: 遠野妖怪戦道行～其の壱～)	Masaki Matsumura	Toshiki Inoue	September 18, 2015
13	"The Road to the Touno Youkai Battle (Part 2)"; Transliteration: "Tōno Yōkai-sen Michiyuki ~Sono Ni~" (Japanese: 遠野妖怪戦道行～其の弐～)	Junichi Fujise	Toshiki Inoue	September 25, 2015
14	"Chasing Hiyou ~ Successor"; Transliteration: "Hiyō Tsuiseki ~ Denshōsha" (Japanese: 婢妖追跡～伝承者)	Jun Shishido	Toshiki Inoue	October 2, 2015
15	"The Crossroads of the Chase ~ Successor"; Transliteration: "Tsuigeki no Kōsa ~ Denshōsha" (Japanese: 追撃の交差～伝承者)	Hiroyasu Aoki	Toshiki Inoue	October 9, 2015
16	"Transformation"; Transliteration: "Henbō" (Japanese: 変貌)	Tomoya Tanaka	Toshiki Inoue	October 16, 2015
17	"To Kamui Kotan"; Transliteration: "Kamui Kotan e" (Japanese: カムイコタンへ)	Daisuke Yoshida	Shōji Yonemura	October 23, 2015
18	"Revival: And Finally..."; Transliteration: "Fukkatsu ~ Soshite Tsui ni" (Japanese: 復活～そしてついに)	Masaki Matsumura	Shōji Yonemura	October 30, 2015
19	"The Demon That Turns Back Time"; Transliteration: "Tokisaka no Ayakashi" (Japanese: 時逆の妖)	Tomoaki Koshida	Toshiki Inoue	November 6, 2015
20	"The Demon Returns"; Transliteration: "Ayakashi, Kikaesu" (Japanese: 妖、帰還す)	Jun Shishido	Toshiki Inoue	November 13, 2015
21	"The Fourth: Kirio"; Transliteration: "Yoninme no Kirio" (Japanese: 四人目のキリオ)	Hiroyasu Aoki	Toshiki Inoue	November 20, 2015
22	"Great Summoning: Destruction of the Beast Spear"; Transliteration: "Gekishū: Kemono no Yari Hakai no Koto" (Japanese: 激召～獣の槍破壊のこと)	Taisuke Mamori	Toshiki Inoue	November 27, 2015
23	"Eternal Solitude"; Transliteration: "Eigō no Kodoku" (Japanese: 永劫の孤独)	Daisuke Yoshida	Toshiki Inoue	December 4, 2015
24	"The Fools Gather at the Banquet"; Transliteration: "Orokamono wa Utage ni Tsudou" (Japanese: 愚か者は宴に集う)	Masaki Matsumura	Toshiki Inoue	December 11, 2015
25	"H.A.M.M.R~The H.A.M.M.R Institute~"; Transliteration: "H.A.M.M.R~Hama Kikan~" (Japanese: H・A・M・M・R～ハマー機関～)	Tomoaki Koshida	Miyuki Kishimoto	December 18, 2015
26	"Tatari Breaker"	Daisuke Yoshida	Miyuki Kishimoto	December 25, 2015
Part 2
27	"The Wind Blows"; Transliteration: "Kaze ga Fuku" (Japanese: 風が吹く)	Junichi Fujise	Shōji Yonemura	April 1, 2016
28	"I Won't Lose Anyone Else"; Transliteration: "Mō Kobosanai" (Japanese: もうこぼさない)	Nanako Shimazaki	Shōji Yonemura	April 8, 2016
29	"The Night of the Crescent Moon"; Transliteration: "Mikazuki no Yoru" (Japanese: 三日月の夜)	Taisuke Mamori	Toshiki Inoue	April 15, 2016
30	"The Journey of No Return"; Transliteration: "Fuki no Tabi" (Japanese: 不帰の旅)	Masaki Matsumura	Toshiki Inoue	April 22, 2016
31	"To the Sea of Chaos"; Transliteration: "Konton no Umi e" (Japanese: 混沌の海へ)	Tomoaki Koshida	Shōji Yonemura	April 29, 2016
32	"Mother"; Transliteration: "Haha" (Japanese: 母)	Daisuke Yoshida	Shōji Yonemura	May 6, 2016
33	"The Beast Spear Destroyed"; Transliteration: "Kemono no Yari Hakai" (Japanese: 獣の槍破壊)	Hiroshi Kōjina & Junichi Fujise	Toshiki Inoue	May 13, 2016
34	"Tora" (Japanese: とら)	Nanako Shimazaki	Toshiki Inoue	May 20, 2016
35	"Hope"; Transliteration: "Kibō" (Japanese: 希望)	Taisuke Mamori	Shōji Yonemura	May 27, 2016
36	"To the Promised Night"; Transliteration: "Yakusoku no Yoru e" (Japanese: 約束の夜へ)	Masaki Matsumura	Shōji Yonemura	June 3, 2016
37	"The Ultimate Insult"; Transliteration: "Saikyō no Akutai" (Japanese: 最強の悪態)	Tomoaki Koshida	Toshiki Inoue	June 10, 2016
38	"The End"; Transliteration: "Saishū Kyokumen" (Japanese: 最終局面)	Daisuke Yoshida	Toshiki Inoue	June 17, 2016
39	"The Fate of Ushio and Tora"; Transliteration: "Ushio to Tora no En" (Japanese: うしおととらの縁)	Satoshi Nishimura, Masaki Matsumura & Junichi Fujise	Toshiki Inoue	June 24, 2016
