= Ushio to Tora: Shin'en no Daiyō =

1993 video game

- Cover art
- Developer(s): Pixel, Tom Create
- Publisher(s): Yutaka
- Composer(s): Masaharu Iwata
- Platform(s): Family Computer
- Release: JP: July 9, 1993
- Genre(s): Role-playing game
- Mode(s): Single-player

Ushio to Tora: Shin'en no Daiyō (うしおととら：深淵の大妖) is an RPG (Role-playing game) based on the manga series of the same name about a boy and his uneasy friendship with a demon. Released on the Family Computer in 1993 by Yutaka the game has the player in the main role of Ushio in a standard RPG adventure.

This video game is not to be confused with the Super Famicom action game titled Ushio to Tora.

== Gameplay ==
Players unleash their traditional Japanese magic spells in addition to their ally's demonic skills in a game that resembles a Japanese role-playing game. They get to explore Tokyo by moving the character around using a top-down perspective. Houses and dungeons are viewed using a perspective used in traditional interactive fiction stories. The character gets his own statistics screen; which summarizes his offensive skills as well as his defensive skills.

Players can talk to characters and must solve certain quests and/or puzzles before being admitted into certain buildings, houses, or dungeons.
