= Yasuko Kobayashi =

Japanese anime and tokusatsu drama screenwriter

- 小林 靖子
- Born: April 7, 1965 (age 61); Koto, Tokyo, Japan
- Occupation: Screenwriter

Yasuko Kobayashi (小林 靖子, Kobayashi Yasuko; born April 7, 1965) is a Japanese anime and tokusatsu drama screenwriter who has been involved in various television shows throughout her career, beginning in 1993 with Tokusou Robo Janperson.

In September 2022, Kobayashi launched a new manga series with illustrations by Saki Nonoyama titled Danzai Lock in Kodansha's Comic Days website.

== Filmography ==
=== Television ===
Since her debut writing credits in Janperson, Kobayashi has been the main writer on many anime and tokusatsu television series and films. She has also been a writer on individual episodes within other series. Her credits as head writer are listed below in bold.

==== Anime television series ====
- Hell Teacher Nube (1997)
- Yu-Gi-Oh! (1998)
- Angel Links (1999)
- **Dinozaurs** (2000)
- Gear Fighter Dendoh (2000–2001)
- **I My Me! Strawberry Eggs** (2001)
- Galaxy Angel (2001)
- Galaxy Angel Z (2002)
- Cyborg 009: The Cyborg Soldier (2002)
- Pita-Ten (2002)
- Panyo Panyo Di Gi Charat (2002)
- Seven of Seven (2002)
- Galaxy Angel AA (2003)
- Galaxy Angel S (2003)
- Gilgamesh (2003)
- Di Gi Charat Nyo! (2003–2004)
- Galaxy Angel X (2004)
- Genshiken (2004)
- **Gokusen** (2004)
- Sgt. Frog (2005)
- Guyver: The Bioboosted Armor (2005–2006)
- **Shakugan no Shana** (2005–2006)
- 009-1 (2006)
- Kamisama Kazoku (2006)
- **Witchblade** (2006)
- **Yume Tsukai** (2006)
- Death Note (2006–2007)
- **Claymore** (2007)
- Princess Resurrection (2007)
- **Shakugan no Shana Second** (2007–2008)
- Blassreiter (2008)
- **Casshern Sins** (2008–2009)
- **Shakugan no Shana Final** (2011-2012)
- **JoJo's Bizarre Adventure** (2012–2013)
- **Attack on Titan** (2013–2019)
- **Garo: The Carved Seal of Flames** (2014–2015)
- **JoJo's Bizarre Adventure: Stardust Crusaders** (2014–2015)
- **JoJo's Bizarre Adventure: Diamond Is Unbreakable** (2016)
- **Kakegurui** (2017)
- **JoJo's Bizarre Adventure: Golden Wind** (2018–2019)
- **Kakegurui ××** (2019)
- **Dororo** (2019)
- **JoJo's Bizarre Adventure: Stone Ocean** (2021–2022)

==== Live action television ====
- Tokusou Robo Janperson (1993)
- Blue SWAT (1994)
- Juukou B-Fighter (1995–1996)
- B-Fighter Kabuto (1996–1997)
- Denji Sentai Megaranger (1997–1998)
- **Seijuu Sentai Gingaman** (1998–1999)
- Kyuukyuu Sentai GoGoFive (1999-2000)
- **Mirai Sentai Timeranger** (2000–2001)
- Kamen Rider Agito (2001)
- **Kamen Rider Ryuki** (2002–2003)
- **Pretty Guardian Sailor Moon** (2003–2004)
- GoGo Sentai Boukenger (2006)
- **Kamen Rider Den-O** (2007–2008)
- Kamen Rider Decade (2009)
- **Samurai Sentai Shinkenger** (2009–2010)
- **Kamen Rider OOO** (2010–2011)
- Garo: Makai Senki (2011)
- **Tokumei Sentai Go-Busters** (2012–2013)
- **Zero: Black Blood** (2014)
- **Ressha Sentai ToQger** (2014–2015)
- **Kamen Rider Amazons** (2016–2017)
- **Thus Spoke Kishibe Rohan** (2020–present)

=== Films ===
==== Anime ====
- Yu-Gi-Oh! (1999)
- Digimon Tamers: Battle of Adventurers (2001)
- Shakugan no Shana The Movie (2007)
- Trigun: Badlands Rumble (2010)
- Hayate the Combat Butler! Heaven Is a Place on Earth (2011)
- Attack on Titan (2014–2020)
  - Part 1: Crimson Bow and Arrow (2014)
  - Part 2: Wings of Freedom (2015)
  - The Roar of Awakening (2018)
  - Chronicle (2020)
- Garo: Divine Flame (2018)

===== OVAs =====
- Shakugan no Shana SP (2006)
- Shakugan no Shana S (2009–2010)

==== Live action ====
- Kamen Rider Den-O: I'm Born! (2007)
- Kamen Rider Den-O & Kiva: Climax Deka (2008)
- Saraba Kamen Rider Den-O: Final Countdown (2008)
- Cho Kamen Rider Den-O & Decade Neo Generations: The Onigashima Warship (2009)
- Samurai Sentai Shinkenger The Movie: The Fateful War (2009)
- Samurai Sentai Shinkenger vs. Go-onger: GinmakuBang!! (2010)
- Kamen Rider × Kamen Rider × Kamen Rider The Movie: Cho-Den-O Trilogy (2010)
  - Episode Red: Zero no Star Twinkle
  - Episode Blue: The Dispatched Imagin is Newtral
- Kamen Rider OOO Wonderful: The Shogun and the 21 Core Medals (2011)
- Kamen Rider × Kamen Rider Fourze & OOO: Movie War Mega Max (2011)
  - Kamen Rider OOO: Ankh's Resurrection, the Medals of the Future, and the Leading Hope
- Tokumei Sentai Go-Busters the Movie: Protect the Tokyo Enetower! (2012)
- Ressha Sentai ToQger the Movie: Galaxy Line S.O.S. (2014)
- Ressha Sentai ToQger vs. Kyoryuger: The Movie (2015)
- Touken Ranbu (2019)
