= Toshiki Inoue =

Japanese screenwriter

Toshiki Inoue (井上 敏樹, Inoue Toshiki; born November 28, 1959) is a Japanese screenwriter from Saitama Prefecture. He is known for his work on anime and tokusatsu dramas and films. He is the son of Masaru Igami (伊上勝, Igami Masaru), who himself was a screenwriter for tokusatsu dramas. He is also a manga author, and has written both Mebius Gear and Sword Gai.

== Biography ==
Inoue was born the child of Masaru Igami, a screenwriter known for his works on shows such as Kamen Rider and Akakage. Belonging to the fantasy literature Study Group at Seikei University, a short story written by Inoue caught the way of Toei Animation producer Shichijo Keizo, leading to his debut screenplay in 1981 with the 24th episode of Dr. Slump, "Arale's Big Change!" Since then, he was the head writer of animated works such as Galaxy Angel, Kiba, and Death Note.

Like his father, Inoue also has done prolific work in the tokusatsu genre. In 1991, he was the head writer of the Toei tokusatsu series Chōjin Sentai Jetman, part of the popular Super Sentai franchise. In 1996, he was the head writer of Choukou Senshi Changéríon, writing the majority of its 39 episode run. He has also written extensively within the Kamen Rider franchise, writing almost every episode for Kamen Rider Agito, Kamen Rider 555, and Kamen Rider Kiva. During the production shuffle for Kamen Rider Hibiki, Inoue was brought in to be the head writer from episode 30 onwards, including writing the series' movie, Kamen Rider Hibiki & The Seven Senki. Inoue is also responsible for most of the Kamen Rider films within the 2000s, including two original films, Kamen Rider the First and Kamen Rider the Next, which were retelling of the original Kamen Rider series, and Kamen Rider V3, respectively. In 2013, Inoue was appointed as the head writer of Shougeki Gouraigan, created by fellow tokusatsu veteran Keita Amemiya.

Inoue's style of writing leans towards the skepticism of "complete integrity of the heroic ideal". His protagonists have a tendency to be calculative, have a scruffy attitude, or be generally flawed, allowing for "trauma" within the series. Interpersonal conflict is as important as the action within the series, with unity being difficult to achieve even among the heroes. The universal theme of "What is justice, love and friendship" is used as catharsis, placing the heroes against their antithesis. He is also influenced by the books of Arsene Lupin and Agatha Christie, wishing to give his stories a "touch of mystery".

== Filmography ==
- series head writer denoted in bold

=== Anime television series ===
- Dr. Slump & Arale-chan (1981–1982)
- Mirai Keisatsu Urashiman (1983)
- Okawari-Boy Starzan S (1984)
- Fist of the North Star (1984)
- Urusei Yatsura (1984–1986)
- Dirty Pair (1985)
- Doteraman (1986)
- Dragon Ball (1986–1989)
- City Hunter (1987)
- **Kamen no Ninja Akakage** (1987–1988)
- City Hunter 2 (1988)
- Mashin Hero Wataru (1988)
- **Ranma ½** (1989): head writer (eps 8–18)
- Ranma ½ Nettohen (1989)
- Jushin Liger (1989)
- Legend of Heavenly Sphere Shurato (1989)
- Dragon Ball Z (1989–1990)
- **Yawara! A Fashionable Judo Girl** (1989–1992)
- Obatarian (1990)
- The Brave Express Might Gaine (1993)
- Wild Knights Gulkeeva (1995)
- Detective Conan (1996)
- Ijiwaru Baa-san (1996)
- Grander Musashi (1997)
- Super Express Hikarian (1997)
- The File of Young Kindaichi (1997)
- Bomberman B-Daman Bakugaiden (1998)
- Master Keaton (1998)
- **Yu-Gi-Oh!** (1998)
- **Galaxy Angel** (2001)
- **Galaxy Angel Z** (2002)
- **Panyo Panyo Di Gi Charat** (2002)
- **Ultra Radiant Express Hikarian** (2002)
- **Dragon Drive** (2002)
- **Galaxy Angel A** (2002)
- **Galaxy Angel AA** (2003)
- Fullmetal Alchemist (2003)
- **Ninja Scroll: The Series** (2003)
- **Galaxy Angel S** (2003)
- **Papuwa** (2003–2004)
- **Tenjho Tenge** (2004)
- **Galaxy Angel X** (2004)
- **Legend of DUO** (2004–2005)
- Gaiking: Legend of Daiku-Maryu (2005)
- **Kiba** (2006)
- Witchblade (2006)
- **Sumomomo Momomo** (2006–2007)
- **Death Note** (2006–2007)
- **Devil May Cry: The Animated Series** (2007)
- Happy Lucky Bikkuriman (2007)
- **MapleStory** (2007–2008)
- **Chaos;Head** (2008)
- Kamen no Maid Guy (2008)
- Dragon Ball Z Kai (2009)
- **Iron Man** (2010)
- **Ushio and Tora** (2015–2016)
- **Garo: Crimson Moon** (2015-2016)
- Active Raid (2016)
- **Sword Gai: The Animation** (2018)
- **Karakuri Circus** (2018-2019)
- **Dandivine** (2026)

=== TV tokusatsu ===
- Dokincho! Nemurin (1985)
- Choushinsei Flashman (1986)
- Hikari Sentai Maskman (1987)
- Choujuu Sentai Liveman (1988)
- Kousoku Sentai Turboranger (1989)
- Chikyu Sentai Fiveman (1990)
- **Choujin Sentai Jetman** (1991–1992)
- Kyōryū Sentai Zyuranger (1992)
- Gosei Sentai Dairanger (1993)
- Chōriki Sentai Ohranger (1995)
- **Choukou Senshi Changéríon** (1996)
- Kamen Rider Kuuga (2000)
- Mirai Sentai Timeranger (2000)
- **Tekkōki Mikazuki** (2000–2001)
- **Kamen Rider Agito** (2001–2002)
- Kamen Rider Ryuki (2002)
- Steel Angel Kurumi Pure (2002)
- **Kamen Rider 555** (2003–2004)
- Kamen Rider Blade (2004)
- **Kamen Rider Hibiki** (2005–2006): head writer (eps 30-48)
- Kamen Rider Kabuto (2006)
- **Cutie Honey: The Live** (2007–2008)
- **Kamen Rider Kiva** (2008–2009)
- Kamen Rider Decade (2009)
- Garo: Makai Senki (2011)
- Kaizoku Sentai Gokaiger (2011)
- **Shougeki Gouraigan** (2013)
- Kamen Rider Zi-O (2019)
  - Rider Time: Kamen Rider Ryuki (2019)
  - Rider Time: Kamen Rider Decade vs Kamen Rider Zi-O (2021)
- **Avataro Sentai Donbrothers** (2022)

=== Anime films ===
- Dr. Slump and Arale-chan: Hello! Wonder Island (1981)
- Dr. Slump: "Hoyoyo!" Space Adventure (1982)
- Dr. Slump and Arale-chan: Hoyoyo, Great Round-the-World Race (1983)
- Urusei Yatsura 4: Lum the Forever (1986)
- Dragon Ball: Curse of the Blood Rubies (1986)
- Yawara! Soreyuke Koshinuke Kizzu!! (1989)

=== OVAs ===
- Dark Cat (1991)
- Kamen Rider SD: Strange!? Kumo Otoko (1993)

=== Live action films ===
- Minna Agechau (1985)
- Mechanical Violator Hakaider (1995)
- Kamen Rider Agito: Project G4 (2001)
- Kamen Rider Ryuki: Episode Final (2002)
- Kamen Rider 555: Paradise Lost (2003)
- Kamen Rider Blade: Missing Ace (2004)
- Kamen Rider Hibiki & The Seven Senki (2005)
- Kamen Rider The First (2005)
- Kamen Rider The Next (2007)
- Kamen Rider Kiva: King of the Castle in the Demon World (2008)
- Kamen Rider × Kamen Rider OOO & W Featuring Skull: Movie War Core (2010)
  - Kamen Rider OOO: Nobunaga's Desire
- Kamen Rider 1 (2016)
- Avataro Sentai Donbrothers vs. Zenkaiger (2023)
