= Yutaka (video game company) =

Japanese video game company

- Native name: ユタカ
- Romanized name: Yutaka
- Industry: Entertainment
- Founded: 1990
- Defunct: 2003
- Products: Video games
- Parent: Bandai (1990–2003)

Yutaka (Note: Japanese: ユタカ, Hepburn: Yutaka), founded as Shinsei Industry (Note: Japanese: 新正工業株式会社, Hepburn: Kabushiki gaisha Shinsei kōgyō), was a Japanese company that operated in the field of video game publishing. In 1987, Shinsei Industry and Bandai Group formed a partnership, which resulted in some games (such as Master Karateka) being published under the name "Bandai Shinsei".
Yukata joined the Bandai Group and changed its name to Yutaka Co., Ltd. in January 1990. In 2003, Yutaka changed its name to Popy Co., Ltd. merged with Plex Co., Ltd. on March 1, 2007, to form Plex Co., Ltd.

== Games ==
=== Famicom ===
- Hyokkori Hyōtanjima: Nazo no Kaizokusen
- Karakuri Kengoden Musashi Lord: Karakuri Jin Shissouru
- Last Armageddon
- Mahou no Princess Minky Momo: Remember Dream
- Nakayoshi to Issho
- Parody World: Monster Party
- SD Gundam World Gachapon Senshi 3: Eiyuu Senki
- SD Gundam World Gachapon Senshi 4: New Type Story
- SD Gundam World Gachapon Senshi 5: Battle of Universal Century
- Ultraman Club 3: Mata Mata Shutsugeki!! Ultra Kyōdai
- Ushio to Tora: Shinen no Daiyō

=== Super Famicom ===
- 3×3 Eyes Seima kōrin-den
- Dear Boys
- Kachō Shima Kōsaku: Super Business Adventure
- Kamen Rider SD: Shutsugeki!! Rider Machine
- Kinnikuman: Dirty Challenger
- Logos Panic: Goaisatu
- NEW Yatterman: Nandai Kanndai Yajirobe
- Ryūki Heidan Danzarb
- SD Gundam Gaiden 2: Entaku no Kishi
- Shin Seikoku: La Wares
- Supapoon
- Supapoon DX
- Super Gachapon World: SD Gundam X
- Ultra League: Moero! Soccer Daikessen!!
- Ushio To Tora

=== Game Boy ===
- Kamen Rider SD: Hashire! Mighty Riders
- Karakuri Kengoden Musashi Lord
- Kidō Keisatsu Patlabor: Nerawareta Machi 1990
- Kingyo Chūihō! Wapiko no Waku Waku Stamp Rally!
- Kinnikuman: The Dream Match
- Master Karateka
- Sakigake!! Otokojuku: Meiō-tō Kessen
- Super Bikkuriman: Densetsu no Sekiban
- TV Champion
- Uchuu no Kishi Tekkaman Blade

=== PlayStation ===
- Kyōfu Shinbun
- Proof Club
- Seikoku 1092: Sōheiden
