= Ultra League =

1995 video game

Ultra League: Moero! Soccer Daikessen!!
- Cover art
- Developer(s): Tom Create
- Publisher(s): Yutaka
- Composer(s): Kazuo Sawa
- Platform(s): Super Famicom
- Release: JP: July 28, 1995
- Genre(s): Sports
- Mode(s): Single-player, multiplayer

Ultra League: Moero! Soccer Daikessen!! (ウルトラリーグ 燃えろ！サッカー大決戦！！; lit. Ultra League Moero! Roll-up Soccer!!) is a 1995 Japan-exclusive soccer-based video game released for the Super Famicom. The game features the Japanese super hero Ultraman, among other monsters and aliens.

== Reception ==
On release, Famicom Tsūshin scored the game a 21 out of 40.

== See also ==
- Battle Soccer: Field no Hasha
- Mega Man Soccer
