= TV Champion (video game) =

1994 video game

- Cover art
- Developer: Tom Create
- Publisher: Yutaka
- Composer: Kazuo Sawa
- Platform: Game Boy
- Release: JP: October 28, 1994
- Genre: Sports
- Mode: Single-player

TV Champion (TVチャンピオン) is a Game Boy game based on the game show of the same name, broadcast on TV Tokyo. It includes support for the Super Game Boy, and was released only in Japan.

== Gameplay ==
Playing Pachinko in TV Champion.

The entire game is in Japanese. Literacy is required to understand the rules and to properly play the game. Players have the ability to collect rice in a dish, collect food items to return to their goal post, or perform stunts like pachinko under a strict time limit. All players must eventually win the "Gluttony Championship."

The game does not include any trivia questions, but is intended for fans of the show who want to appear virtually on the show without having to go through the audition process. The player can choose between a male character or a female character. The object is to make it through three rounds of gameplay.

If the player can beat all three rounds, they are considered to be the champion. A password system is used to continue any progress acquired through the game.

== Reception ==
On release, Famicom Tsūshin scored the game a 15 out of 40.
