= Mega Man Soccer =

1994 sports video game published by Capcom

- North American box art
- Developer: Sun L
- Publisher: Capcom
- Producer: Tokuro Fujiwara
- Artist: Keiji Inafune
- Composers: Toshio Okamoto; Norihiko Togashi; Kenichi Tomizawa
- Series: Mega Man
- Platform: Super NES
- Release: JP: March 25, 1994; NA: April 1994
- Genre: Sports
- Modes: Single-player, multiplayer

Mega Man Soccer (Note: Japanese: ロックマンズサッカー, Hepburn: Rokkumanzu Sakkā; lit. 'Rockman's Soccer') is a soccer video game for the Super NES. The game is based on the original Mega Man series of action-platform games. Mega Man Soccer was released in Japan on March 25, 1994, and in North America in April of that same year.

Mega Man Soccer is a traditional soccer game with exhibition matches, tournaments, and leagues that can be played both single-player and multiplayer depending on the mode. The game features characters and Robot Masters from previous entries in the original Mega Man series. Each character has a unique special shot that will temporarily disable anyone that comes in contact with the ball. This aspect of Mega Man Soccer was met with critical praise, but overall reception has been average, particularly due to its controls and frame drops due to the sprites on screen.

== Plot ==
Mega Man Soccer is set after Mega Man 4. A televised soccer game is interrupted when an explosion occurs on the field. As the smoke clears, all the players are suddenly replaced with several of Dr. Wily's Robot Masters. Having seen the events occur onscreen, the inventor Dr. Light sends his greatest creation, the hero Mega Man, along with some of his own Robot Masters to stop them.

Due to a glitch shipped with the game when completing either Championship or Tournament Modes the ending and credit sequences won't play. Instead the game will simply kick the player back to the title screen. The game still does contain the unused ending and credits sequences in its code and they are only accessible through a cheat device or playing a modded version of the game:

- In Championship mode, Mega Man managed to confront and defeat Wily at his arena. Wily then proceeded to beg for mercy, and then fled when the lair began to collapse. Mega Man then collapsed to his feet as rubble rained down on them. Proto Man then watches the sea, and then teleports out. It then shows Wily's lair collapsing while Wily's saucer escapes into the distance. It is unknown whether Mega Man managed to escape from the lair.
- In Tournament mode, Mega Man celebrates his win with Beat carrying a banner saying "You Are The Champ!" and Kalinka and Roll arriving to stand at Mega Man's place. It then shows Proto Man watching the sea and teleporting out, just as in the Championship ending.

== Gameplay ==
The player uses a special attack shot to incapacitate the goalkeeper for an easy score.

Mega Man Soccer is a soccer game that allows the player to play as various characters from the Mega Man series including Mega Man, Proto Man, and several Robot Masters. The game features modes of play much like more traditional sports games, such as exhibition matches, tournaments, and leagues. The "Exhibition" mode lets the player play a single match with a team created using any of the game's 20 characters on one of a dozen themed soccer fields. The "Capcom Championship" mode can be played either one-player or two-player cooperatively. For the first section of this mode, the player is given a team composed entirely of Mega Man robots, and is tasked with defeating eight teams of Robot Masters in an order of the player's choosing. After beating each team, one member of a team joins the player's team and can then be used, much like how Mega Man can gain the ability of a boss at end of each stage in other entries in the series. After all eight teams are defeated, the player has to defeat several other teams which are faced in a set order in the same way the stages taking place in Dr. Wily's castle—the area that always followed the initial eight boss stages—occur in a set order in other Mega Man games. The "Tournament" and "League" modes allow one or two players to pick among nine teams and participate in a tiered schedule of games. Teams that neither player pick must simply be watched.

Mega Man Soccer has four statistics in which characters differ from one another in ability: running, kicking, tackling, and defense. These statistics are displayed on screen when the player is given the chance to set a formation at the beginning of a match, or make substitutions at halftime. Controls in Mega Man Soccer mostly mirror that of a more realistic soccer game. Individual buttons are mapped to shooting, passing, slide tackling opposing players, and headbutting or chestbumping the ball depending on its proximity to the player. The one feature that is decidedly dissimilar to anything in realistic soccer is the inclusion of "special attacks". These shots resemble the abilities used by the characters in other Mega Man games. For example, Cut Man's shot will turn the ball into a pair of cleavers, while Fire Man's shot will set the ball ablaze. Special attacks will temporarily knock down, stun, or otherwise inhibit any character it hits. They generally are much more likely to produce a goal compared to normal shots, but can only be used a few times per game in certain modes. Games consist of two five-minute halves followed by five rounds of penalty kicks if the game remains tied. The clock stops while a goalkeeper has the ball or when the ball is out of bounds.

== Development ==
Mega Man Soccer was first announced in an interview with Capcom's Senior Vice President Joseph Morici in the March 1993 Game Players magazine. Very little was revealed about the game in the months preceding its Japanese release. Series artist Ryuji Higurashi recalled seeing the characters Guts Man and Heat Man in preview screenshots for Mega Man Soccer. After joining Capcom, he was told by the staff that they planned to include them in a prospective sequel to the game. Guts Man was originally featured as part of a sketch for the game's Japanese cover art; when he was cut from the final draft of the game, he was replaced by Proto Man. Several features found within the game's ROM are noticeably inaccessible from the playable version of the game. These include simultaneous play of up to four players using the SNES Multitap, the ability to play as Dr. Wily (otherwise normally available in Elec Man's and Dust Man's teams in League Mode), and a closing credits sequence. Although little has been said about the game's musical score, the song "We Are Rockman" by Tatsuo Kamon, used in the Japanese television commercial for Mega Man Soccer, was included on the Rockman Theme Song Collection CD.

== Reception ==
Reception

Review scores
Publication	Score
Computer and Video Games	79/100
Electronic Gaming Monthly	7/10, 7/10, 6/10, 7/10, 7/10
Famitsu	6/10, 5/10, 6/10, 5/10
Game Players	54%
GamePro	3/5
Hyper	76%
Mega Fun	26%
Official Nintendo Magazine	48/100
Super Play	62%
Total!	71%
Video Games (DE)	62%
VideoGames & Computer Entertainment	6/10
Electronic Games	B−

Mega Man Soccer has met with an overall mediocre critical reception from major gaming publications due to its play control. GamePro found that, aside from the special shots, the game featured sluggish controls, slowdown, and repetitive computer AI. Game Players made similar comments regarding sluggish control and slowdown when too many sprites cover the screen, while Nintendo Power cited poor play control "uncharacteristic of Capcom games". Local newspaper columnists gave the game more positive reviews, such Michael Pflughoeft of The Milwaukee Journal, who felt the game was very easy to play and that the special attacks would be appealing to younger players.

More contemporary retrospectives on the Mega Man series showed mixed opinions on Mega Man Soccer. GamePro ranked the game at number four on its "10 Weirdest Sports Games Ever". The list compared it to sports games in the Mario series, stating that the latter makes more sense in having only one of each character, unlike Mega Man Soccer, which can have multiple copies of characters on the field at one time. Bill Barnwell of IGN also mentioned a similarity to the Mario series, but mentioned that the lack of excellent gameplay in Mega Man Soccer causes it to be "one of the worst soccer games you'll ever play". 1UP.com's Jeremy Parish contrarily recommended the game, calling it "nonsensical, sure, but awfully fun." GameSpot editors Christian Nutt and Justin Speer summarized, "Not particularly good or particularly successful, this is a bargain bin curiosity that is an example of weird directions in which to take your mascot." Brett Elston of GamesRadar found it entertaining to dismantle opponent robots using the special attacks. In 2018, Complex rated Mega Man Soccer 61st in their "The Best Super Nintendo Games of All Time". They felt the game was amazing because of its chaotic gameplay concluding: "Total win on this one, Capcom, total win."

== See also ==
- Battle Soccer: Field no Hasha
- Ultra League: Moero! Soccer Daikessen!!
