= Ushio & Tora =

Japanese manga series and its adaptations

- First tankōbon volume cover, featuring Ushio Aotsuki (front) and Tora (back)

うしおととら (Ushio to Tora)
- Genre: Adventure; Dark fantasy; Supernatural
- Manga
- Written by: Kazuhiro Fujita
- Published by: Shogakukan
- Imprint: Shōnen Sunday Comics
- Magazine: Weekly Shōnen Sunday
- Original run: January 24, 1990 – October 23, 1996
- Volumes: 33 + gaiden
- Original video animation
- Directed by: Kunihiko Yuyama
- Produced by: Hiromu Takao; Tatsuo Ōba; Fumio Ueda
- Written by: Kenji Terada (1–10); Kunihiko Yuyama (11)
- Music by: Shirō Sagisu (1–6); Kei Wakakusa (7–10); Hiroshi Okamoto (11); Etsuko Yamakawa (11)
- Studio: Pastel
- Licensed by: NA: ADV Films
- Released: September 11, 1992 – October 1, 1993
- Episodes: 11
- Anime television series
- Directed by: Satoshi Nishimura
- Produced by: Hidenori Itahashi; Shinji Sekizawa; Shigeki Ozaki; Kazuo Ōnuki
- Written by: Toshiki Inoue; Kazuhiro Fujita
- Music by: Eishi Segawa
- Studio: MAPPA; Studio VOLN
- Licensed by: AUS: Madman Entertainment; NA: Sentai Filmworks; SEA: Muse Communication; UK: Manga Entertainment
- Original network: Tokyo MX, Sun TV, KBS, TV Aichi, BS Fuji
- Original run: July 3, 2015 – June 24, 2016
- Episodes: 39
- icon

Ushio & Tora (Japanese: うしおととら, Hepburn: Ushio to Tora) is a Japanese manga series written and illustrated by Kazuhiro Fujita. It was serialized in Shogakukan's shōnen manga magazine Weekly Shōnen Sunday from January 1990 to October 1996, with its chapters collected in 33 tankōbon volumes. The series follows the adventures of Ushio Aotsuki, the son of a temple keeper, who after having reluctantly released the imprisoned powerful tiger-like monster, Tora, the two begin a journey together, fighting against supernatural beings threatening the world.

An 11-episode (including an additional episode) original video animation (OVA) adaptation, produced by Toho and animated by Pastel, was released from September 1992 to October 1993. The series was later adapted into a 39-episode anime television series by MAPPA and Studio VOLN, which aired from July 2015 to June 2016. In North America, the OVA was licensed by ADV Films in 1998, and re-released in 2003, while the anime television series was licensed by Sentai Filmworks in 2015.

Ushio & Tora won the 37th Shogakukan Manga Award in the shōnen category in 1992 and the Seiun Award in the Best Comic category in 1997. By 2015, the manga had over 30 million copies in circulation. The series has earned positive reviews for Ushio and Tora's compelling dynamics and effective blend of action and humor, though some critics found the plot somewhat simplistic. The OVA adaptation drew particular criticism for its tonal inconsistency due to graphic violence.

== Story ==
Ushio Aotsuki, the son of a temple caretaker, stumbles upon Tora—a fearsome tiger-like yōkai sealed in his family's basement for five centuries by the cursed Beast Spear. This legendary weapon, wielded by Ushio's ancestor, grants enhanced abilities at the cost of the user's soul. When Ushio's accidental discovery weakens the seal, Tora's demonic aura attracts lesser monsters, forcing Ushio to fully release him despite Tora's immediate threat to devour him.

The series chronicles their contentious partnership as they battle supernatural threats across Japan, particularly the ancient yōkai Hakumen no Mono. Though Tora maintains his predatory nature, he gradually develops unexpected protectiveness toward humans. Their dynamic evolves from mutual hostility to reluctant camaraderie, with Tora adapting to modern life while concealing his growing moral compass. The Beast Spear remains both Ushio's weapon against yōkai and his protection from Tora, who secretly fights evil with more dedication than he admits.

== Media ==
=== Manga ===
Written and illustrated by Kazuhiro Fujita, Ushio & Tora was serialized in Shogakukan's shōnen manga magazine Weekly Shōnen Sunday from January 24, 1990, to October 23, 1996. Shogakukan collected its 312 individual chapters in 33 tankōbon volumes, released from November 17, 1990, to December 10, 1996. An additional gaiden volume was released on May 17, 1997. Shogakukan re-published the series in a 19-volume bunkoban edition from September 15, 2004, to March 15, 2006. A 20-volume kanzenban edition was published between May 18, 2015, and December 16, 2016.

Fujita drew a two-chapter short of the series to raise funds for areas devastated by the March 2011 earthquake. These chapters were published in Weekly Shōnen Sunday on December 26, 2012, and January 9, 2013.

=== Other print media ===
Four light novels written by Bunjūrō Nakayama (as Katsuyuki Shiroike) were published under Shogakukan's Super Quest Bunko imprint. They were released from December 18, 1992, to September 29, 1995. Two light novels written by Nakayama were published under Shogakukan's Gagaga Bunko imprint on December 18, 2008, and January 21, 2009.

Two artbooks were published by Shogakukan on April 16 and July 16, 1997. Both artbooks were re-released in a new edition, including more illustrations and interviews, on April 15, 2015.

=== Anime ===
==== Original video animation ====
Ushio & Tora was adapted into a ten-episode original video animation (OVA) series produced by Toho and animated by studio Pastel, released from September 11, 1992, to August 1, 1993. A single parody episode, titled Ushio & Tora: Comically Deformed Theater (うしおととら コミカル デフォルメ劇場, Ushio to Tora Komikaru Deforume Gekijō), was released on October 1, 1993.

In North America, ADV Films produced an English dub of the first two episodes in 1998, but the project was abandoned. In 2003, ADV re-released the series on DVD, with a new dub, and including all the episodes.

==== Television series ====
An anime television adaptation was produced by MAPPA and Studio VOLN. It was directed by Satoshi Nishimura and written by Toshiki Inoue and Kazuhiro Fujita, featuring character designs by Tomoko Mori and music by Eishi Segawa. The first season (episodes 1–26) aired between July 3 and December 25, 2015, and the second season (episodes 27–39) aired between April 1 and June 24, 2016. For the first season, the opening theme is "Mazeru na Kiken" (混ぜるな危険; lit. 'Mixing Danger') by Kinniku Shōjo Tai, and the ending themes are "Hero" by Sonar Pocket and "Makeruna Chiisaki Mono Yo" (負けるな小さきものよ; lit. 'Don't Lose the Small Things') by Wakadanna. For the second season, the opening theme is "Shūgawari no Kiseki no Shinwa" (週替わりの奇跡の神話; lit. 'The Legend of Weekly Miracles') by Kinniku Shōjo Tai, and the ending theme is "Kessen Zen'ya" (決戦前夜; lit. 'The Night Before the Decisive Battle') by Lunkhead. The entire series was released in a box set on December 20, 2017.

In North America, both seasons were streamed on Crunchyroll. The series was licensed by Sentai Filmworks in 2015, and began streaming with an English dub on Hidive in 2017. After the acquisition of Crunchyroll by Sony Pictures Television, Ushio & Tora, among several Sentai Filmworks titles, was dropped from the Crunchyroll streaming service on March 31, 2022. It has also been licensed in the United Kingdom by Manga Entertainment, and in Southeast Asia by Muse Communication.

A five-minute short, as part of a collaboration with Animation x Paralympic, aired on NHK BS on February 27, 2024. It is a para-archery short featuring a portrayal of real-life Paralympic archer Aiko Okazaki, voiced by Kumiko Aso. Tasuku Hatanaka (Ushio), Rikiya Koyama (Tora), and Megumi Hayashibara (Hakumen no Mono) reprised their roles from the anime television series. Burnout Syndromes performed the theme song "Amateras".

=== Video games ===
Ushio to Tora game was released for the Super Famicom on January 22, 1993. The game is an action title created by Yutaka. Players can take the role of Ushio or Tora. Ushio to Tora: Shin'en no Daiyō (うしおととら 深淵の大妖) was released for the Family Computer on July 9, 1993.

Ushio is featured as a playable character in the Weekly Shōnen Sunday and Weekly Shōnen Magazine crossover game Sunday vs Magazine: Shūketsu! Chōjō Daikessen, released for the PlayStation Portable in 2009.

A collaboration event with the Shin Megami Tensei: Liberation Dx2 mobile phone video game started on July 10, 2025.

=== Stage play ===
In July 2022, it was announced that the series would receive a stage play adaptation, directed by Naoyuki Yoshihisa and starring Keita Tokushiro as Ushio and Takehiro Haruhira as Tora. It ran at the Theater Sun Mall in Tokyo from August 18–21, 2022.

== Reception ==
=== Manga ===
By 2015, Ushio & Tora had over 30 million copies in circulation. The manga won the 37th Shogakukan Manga Award in the shōnen category in 1992. It won the Seiun Award in the Best Comic category in 1997. On a 2020 poll conducted by the Goo website about the best Weekly Shōnen Sunday titles, Ushio & Tora ranked second. On TV Asahi's Manga Sōsenkyo 2021 poll, in which 150.000 people voted for their top 100 manga series, Ushio & Tora ranked 48th.

=== Anime ===
==== Original video animation ====
Charles McCarter of EX highlighted the dynamic between Ushio and Tora as the series' core appeal, praising Chikao Ohtsuka's vocal performance for Tora, "changing from frightening to hurt and offended in the blink of an eye." He likened the series to a "grown-up, supernaturally powered Calvin and Hobbes", commending its fight sequences while noting that its most memorable moments were often the quieter, comedic interactions between the leads. Kevin A. Pezzano of SciFi.com similarly praised the protagonists' antagonistic relationship as the anime's standout feature, though he cautioned that its blend of action and comedy might not appeal to fans of either genre. Andrew Tei of AnimeOnDVD lauded the series' humor and character dynamics, recommending it as a noteworthy title worthy of inclusion in any collection.

Mike Toole of Anime Jump called the OVA "the most shounen show I've ever seen", acknowledging its "formulaic premise, sloppy character design, and fairly lackluster animation", but praising its fast-paced action scenes and slapstick comedy. However, he criticized its graphic violence as excessive, recommending it only to viewers tolerant of gore. Brian Hanson (also of Anime Jump) likened the OVA to a "best of" compilation from the original manga, faulting its episodic format and lack of development for supporting characters.

Barb Lien-Cooper of Sequential Tart called the series a "Japan's answer to Stanley and His Monster", praising its shift from lighthearted comedy to effective horror, though she noted its mature content made it unsuitable for young audiences. Stephen D. Grant of THEM Anime Reviews called the series surprisingly compelling despite its premise, though he criticized its "gratuitous" violence.

Jonathan Mays of Anime News Network (ANN) acknowledged the series' adherence to shōnen tropes but found it "genuinely funny", albeit only worth a single viewing. Bamboo Dong (also of ANN) dismissed it as "mediocre" and overly repetitive, favoring similar series like Inuyasha instead. Todd Ciolek (ANN) offered a more neutral assessment, calling it "not-unwatchable." The Anime Encyclopedia praised the series' effective mix of supernatural action and Japanese folklore, highlighting its thematic depth and strong protagonist dynamic. While noting the adaptation's incomplete coverage of Fujita's manga, they commended its tonal versatility and the English localization from ADV Films as standout qualities among 1990s anime.

==== Television series ====
Miranda Sanchez of IGN praised the first episode's faithful adaptation of the manga's aesthetic, noting its successful blend of comedy and character dynamics. She highlighted the distinct 1990s animation qualities and the protagonists' rivalry as establishing strong series potential. Stig Høgset of THEM Anime Reviews commended the series' "raw, old-timer shounen energy", praising its classic appeal despite some dated elements. Reviewing the second season, he noted its accelerated pacing and called the finale a "bittersweet, but magnificent end." Gareth Evans of Starburst observed the tonal shift from lighthearted to serious storytelling, ultimately praising its cohesive narrative and horror elements.

The Fandom Post's reviewers offered mixed perspectives. Chris Beveridge highlighted the successful modernization of classic designs, while Chris Homer praised its energetic adaptation despite compression issues. Brandon Varnell criticized its romantic subplots but acknowledged its shōnen appeal. Gabriella Ekens of ANN compared the series to Yu Yu Hakusho and Inuyasha, praising its nostalgic execution and "remarkably well structured" plot.
