= Lunkhead =

Lunkhead (ランクヘッド)
- Origin: Shikoku, Japan
- Genres: Rock; Pop punk
- Years active: 1999–present
- Labels: Victor Entertainment, Chockyu co. ltd.
- Members: Odaka Yoshitarou; Gouda Satoru; Yamashita Sou; Ishikawa Ryou
- Website: www.lunkhead.jp

Lunkhead (ランクヘッド) is a Japanese rock band signed under Victor Entertainment and is managed by Chockyu co. ltd. The band played its first show during their high school graduation ceremony in 1999.

Lunkhead officially became a band when all four members reunited in Tokyo in 2000.

On 2 February 2009, drummer Ishikawa Ryou announced on the band's official website of his departure from the band in April 2009.

== Band members ==
- Odaka Yoshitarou (小高芳太朗)
  - Vocalist, Guitarist, Main Songwriter
  - Birthdate: 15 April 1980
  - Hometown: Niihama, Ehime Prefecture
  - Alma mater: Waseda University, Engineering
  - Additional info: Number Girl is held in high esteem. Enjoys cooking.
- Yamashita Sou (山下壮)
  - Guitarist
  - Birthdate: 5 December 1980
  - Hometown: Niihama, Ehime Prefecture
  - Alma mater: Aoyama Gakuin University
  - Additional info: Studied in Wisconsin, USA for about 10 months when he was a junior high school student.
- Gouda Satoru (合田悟)
  - Bassist
  - Birthdate: 24 July 1980
  - Hometown: Ehime Prefecture
  - Alma mater: Hosei University, Economics
- Ishikawa Ryou (石川龍)
  - Drummer
  - Birthdate: 28 September 1980
  - Hometown: Ehime Prefecture
  - Alma mater: Meiji University, Law
  - Additional info: Is good at martial arts.

== Discography ==
=== Albums ===
Full-length albums

1. Chizu (地図)
  - Release Date: 23 June 2004
  - 1st full album
  - Track List:
    1. Oto (音
    2. Fuyu no Asa (冬の朝)
    3. Prism (プリズム)
    4. Shiroi Koe (白い声)
    5. Yakou Bas (夜行バス)
    6. Hakudaku (白濁)
    7. Sono Kan 5 Meter (その間5メートル)
    8. Zenshin Boku Senjou he (album version) (前進/僕/戦場へ)
    9. Hai Sora (灰空)
    10. Sangatsu (三月)
    11. Senkawa Doori wa Yuu Kaze datta (guitar version) (千川通りは夕風だった)
    12. Kinmokusei (金木犀)
2. Tsuki to Tenohira (月と手のひら)
  - Release Date: 11 May 2005
  - 2nd full album
  - Track List:
    1. Gekkou Shounen (月光少年)
    2. Goodbye (グッド・バイ)
    3. Taion (体温)
    4. Sakana no Uta (魚の歌)
    5. Hitorigoto (ひとりごと)
    6. Himeyuri no Hana (姫百合の花)
    7. Jibun wo Aisu to Kimetanda (自分を愛すと決めたんだ)
    8. Semi (蝉)
    9. Reiji (零時)
    10. Highlight (ハイライト)
    11. Tsuki to Tenohira (月と手のひら)
    12. Hidden track
3. Lunkhead (self titled)
  - Release Date: 21 June 2006
  - 3rd full album
  - Track List:
    1. Koi wo Shiteiru (恋をしている)
    2. Canaria Box (カナリア ボックス)
    3. Subete (すべて)
    4. Hikari no Machi (光の街)
    5. Clover (クローバー)
    6. Bokura no Senaka to Taiyou to (僕らの背中と太陽と)
    7. Niji (虹)
    8. A.M.
    9. Black Misty Island (ブラック・ミスティ・アイランド)
    10. Loop
    11. Soshite Asa ga Kita (そして朝が来た)
    12. Purukerima (album version) (プルケリマ)
4. Force
  - Release Date: 27 June 2007
  - 4th full album
  - Track List:
    1. Oto
    2. Heart Beater
    3. Giggle (ギグル)
    4. Kiseki (奇跡)
    5. Kirariiro (きらりいろ)
    6. Natsu no Nioi (夏の匂い)
    7. Paradoxical (パラドクサル)
    8. Huan to Yume (不安と夢)
    9. Glass Ball (Garasu Dama) (ガラス玉)
    10. Nemurenai Yoru no koto (眠れない夜のこと)
    11. Heavens Door (ヘヴンズドア)
    12. Bokura ha Ikiru (僕らは生きる)
    13. Sakura Biyori (桜日和)
5. Fuka (孵化)
  - Release Date: 16 April 2008
  - 5th full album
  - Track List:
    1. I.D.
    2. Subarashii Sekai (素晴らしい世界)
    3. Hane (羽根)
    4. Cider (サイダー)
    5. Kyoushitsu (教室)
    6. Kurage (海月)
    7. Darekajanakute (誰かじゃなくて)
    8. guruguru (ぐるぐる)
    9. Persona (ペルソナ)
    10. Kokoro (こころ)
    11. Brave Song
6. Atom
  - Release Date: 24 June 2009
  - Upcoming 6th full album
  - Track List:
    1. Yami no Akabe
    2. Hana wa Ikiru Koto wo Mayowanai
    3. Small World
    4. Kieta Parade
    5. Love Song
    6. Kokyuu
    7. Totto
    8. Birthday
    9. Soredemo Chi no Iro wa Tetsu no Ajikashita
    10. Trident
    11. Utaitai

Mini albums

1. Kage to Tabako to Boku to Ao (影と煙草と僕と青)
  - 1st mini album
  - Release Date: 21 May 2003
  - Track List:
    1. Tokyo ni te (東京にて)
    2. Kono Kenkireru (この剣斬れる)
    3. Monoomoi ni Fukeru Niwa (物思いに耽る庭)
    4. Kareri To (帰り途)
    5. Saigo no Tane (最後の種)
    6. Boku to Ki (僕と樹)
2. Purukerima (プルケリマ)
  - Release Date: 26 October 2005
  - 2nd Mini Album
  - Track List:
    1. Purukerima (プルケリマ)
    2. Indigo (インディゴ)
    3. Komorebi (木漏れ陽)
    4. Kimi to Cosmos (君とコスモス)
    5. Bokuranouta (僕らのうた)
    6. Electric (エレクトリック)

Best album

Entrance: Best Of Lunkhead Age 18-27

- Release Date: 5 March 2008
- Track List:
  1. Entrance
  2. Sengawa Doori wa Yuu Kaze datta (千川通りは夕風だった)
  3. Shiroi Koe (白い声)
  4. Zenshin Boku Senjou he (album version) (前進／僕／戦場へ（アルバム・バージョン）)
  5. Gekkou Shounen (月光少年)
  6. Taion (体温)
  7. Highlight (ハイライト)
  8. Purukerima (プルケリマ)
  9. Indigo (インディゴ)
  10. Canaria Vox (カナリア ボックス)
  11. Hikari no Machi (光の街)
  12. Bokura no Senaka to Taiyou to (僕らの背中と太陽と)
  13. Kirari iro (きらりいろ)
  14. Natsu no Nioi (夏の匂い)
  15. Swallow Tail (スワロウテイル)
  16. Tokyo ni te (東京にて（new ver.）)
  17. Boku to ki (僕と樹（new ver.）)
    - Additional Info:
      - Fans were able to vote for their favorite songs to appear on the album through Victor Entertainment online site and through cellphones.
      - Album release was to commemorate the 10th anniversary of the band's formation.

=== Singles ===
1. Senkawa doori wa Yuu Kaze datta (千川通りは夕風だった)
  - Release Date: 15 October 2003
2. Senkawa Doori wa Yuu Kaze datta (千川通りは夕風だった)
  - Re-Release
  - Date: 11 May 2005
  - Track list:
    1. Senkawa Doori wa Yuu Kaze datta (千川通りは夕風だった)
    2. Laundry (ランドリー)
    3. Yuugure no (夕暮れの)
3. Shiroi Koe (白い声)
  - Release Date: 21 January 2004
  - Track list:
    1. Shiroi Koe (白い声)
    2. Zenshin Boku Senjou he (前進/僕/戦場へ)
4. Prism (プリズム)
  - Release Date: 19 May 2004
  - Track list:
    1. Prism (プリズム)
    2. Itsukano Densha no Oto ga suru (いつかの電車の音がする)
    3. Sakura Ko (桜子)
5. Hitorigoto (ひとりごと)
  - Release Date: 10 November 2004
  - Track list:
    1. Hitorigoto (ひとりごと)
    2. Jyougen (上弦)
6. Taion (体温)
  - Release Date: 24 March 2005
  - Track list:
    1. Taion (体温)
    2. Highlight (ハイライト)
    3. Sangatsu version 041204 (三月 ver.041204)
7. Canaria Box (カナリア ボックス)
  - Release Date: 22 February 2006
  - Track list:
    1. Canaria Box (カナリア ボックス)
    2. No.6
    3. Hoshi no Kakera (星の欠片)
8. Subete (すべて)
  - Release Date: 19 April 2006
  - Track list
    1. Subete (すべて)
    2. Hana Uta to Sideways (鼻歌とサイドアウェイ)
    3. Hutari (ふたり)
9. Natsu no Nioi (夏の匂い)
  - Release Date: 19 July 2006
  - Track list:
    1. Natsu no Nioi (夏の匂い)
    2. Zenshin Boku Senjou he Age 26 (前進/僕/戦場へ Age26)
10. Sakura Biyori (桜日和)
  - Release Date: 24 January 2007
  - Track list:
    1. Sakura Biyori (桜日和)
    2. loop(unplugged)
11. Kirariiro (きらりいろ)
  - Release Date: 2 May 2007
  - Track list:
    1. Kirariiro (きらりいろ)
    2. Yasegure (優暮)
12. Subarashii Sekai
  - Release Date: 2 April 2008
  - Track list:
    1. Subarashii Sekai (素晴らしい世界)
    2. Seishun no Kage (青春の影)
    3. Lunkhead Entrance Theme (Lunkhead入場のテーマ)

=== DVD ===
1. Video Clip
  - Release date: 22 November 2006
    1. Senkawa Doori wa Yuu Kaze datta (千川通りは夕風だった)
    2. Shiroi Koe (白い声)
    3. Prism (プリズム)
    4. Sangatsu (三月)
    5. Hitorigoto TV Promo Version (ひとりごと)
    6. Taion (体温)
    7. Purukerima (プルケリマ)
    8. Canaria Box (カナリア ボックス)
    9. Subete (すべて)
    10. Natsu no Nioi (夏の匂い)
  - DVD-Extra: Part 5 Secret Video/Hikari no Machi Live
2. Live Files 20070301 - Niihama Cultural Center- (新居浜市民文化センター)
  - Release Date: 30 May 2007
  - Recorded during a free live show held at the Niihama Cultural Center on 31 March 3007
  - iTunes special download of tracks on this DVD includes a bonus live version of "Country Roads".
  - Track list:
    1. Natsu no Nioi (夏の匂い)
    2. Gekkou Shounen (月光少年)
    3. Shiroi Koe (白い声)
    4. Sangatsu (三月)
    5. Purukerima (プルケリマ)
    6. Bokurano Senaka to Taiyou to (僕らの背中と太陽と)
    7. Sengawa Doori ha Yuu Kaze datta (千川通りは夕風だった)
    8. Canaria Box (カナリア ボックス)
    9. Sakura Biyori (桜日和)
    10. Soshite Asa ga Kita (そして朝が来た)
3. Live Files 20070603 -Shibuya-AX-
  - Released date: 15 September 2007
  - Live special sale only.
  - Track list:
    1. Opening
    2. Shiroi Koe (白い声)
    3. Taion (体温)
    4. Yasegure (優暮)
    5. Kiseki (奇跡)
    6. Loop
    7. Zenshin Boku Senjou he (前進/僕/戦場へ)
    8. Goodbye (グッドバイ)
    9. Sakura Biyori (桜日和)
    10. Natsu no Nioi (夏の匂い)
    11. Boku to Ki (僕と樹)
    12. Gekkou Shounen (月光少年)
    13. Hikari no Machi (光の街)
    14. Kirari iro (きらりいろ)
    15. Canaria Vox (カナリア ボックス)
    16. Bokura wa Ikiru (僕らは生きる)
    17. Bokura no uta (僕らのうた)
    18. Heart Beater
    19. Highlight (ハイライト)
    20. Indigo (インディゴ)
    21. Soshite Asa ga Kita (そして朝が来た)
    22. Tokyo ni te (東京にて)
4. Live Files 20080316: 新木場Studio Coast
  - Release date: 3 September 2008
  - A special limited edition of the DVD was only sold at an earlier date during three live shows in July 2008. This limited edition DVD contains cover artwork by vocalist, Odaka Yoshitaro.
  - Track list:
    1. Lunkhead Entrance Theme (Lunkhead入場のテーマ)
    2. Entrance
    3. Senkawa Doori wa Yuu Kaze datta (千川通りは夕風だった)
    4. Tokyo ni te (東京にて)
    5. Persona (ペルソナ)
    6. Sakana no Uta (魚の歌)
    7. Highlight (ハイライト)
    8. Kirari iro (きらりいろ)
    9. Sangatsu (三月)
    10. Purukerima (プルケリマ)
    11. Swallow Tail (スワロウテイル)
    12. Subarashii Sekai (素晴らしい世界)
    13. Taion (体温)
    14. Indigo (インディゴ)
    15. Zenshin Boku Senjou he (前進/僕/戦場へ)
    16. Canaria Vox (カナリアボックス)
    17. Bokura wa Ikiru (僕らは生きる)
    18. Hane (羽根)
    19. Gekkou Shounen (月光少年)
    20. Prism (プリズム)
    21. Shiroi Koe (白い声)
    22. Sakura Biyori (桜日和)

=== Compilations ===
- All Apologies: Tribute to Nirvana
  - Release Date: 10 May 2006
  - Track: 1. All Apologies
- Radiohead Tribute -Master's Collection-
  - Release Date: 22 November 2006
  - Track: 8. Creep
- Sakura Songs
  - Release Date: 31 March 2006
  - Track: Sakura Ko
- E.V.Junkie II -Guitarocking
  - Release Date: 30 June 2004
  - Track: Shiroi Koe

=== Miscellaneous discography ===
- play at the Crossroad 1 [ 1999－2000 ] (CD)
  - Sakuusabaku (鯖喰砂漠)/ Radio (ラヂオ)/ Swallow Tail (スワロウテイル)
- play at the Crossroad 2 [ 2000－2001 ] (CD)
  - kakusei☆sai☆redial (覚醒☆再☆リダイヤル)/ Hot Coffee (ホットコーヒー/ Hikoukigumo (飛行機雲)
- 『それでも血の色は鉄の味がした』
  - Live hall limitation CD
- Birthday
  - Spring 2009 Tour, live hall limitation CD

== Books ==
- 地図 Chizu Band Score
  - Publishing Date: 27 October 2004
  - ISBN 4401352335
  - Contains band score for songs in the Chizu album.
- 月と手のひら Tsuki to Tenohira Band Score
  - EAN 4988002477586
  - Contains band score for songs in the Tsuki to Tenohira album.
- Lunkhead Band Score
  - ISBN 978-4-285-11147-7
  - Contains band score for songs in the Lunkhead (self titled) album.
  - Includes a full length interview with band.
  - Includes bonus tabs for Natsu no Nioi.
- Force Band Score
  - Publishing Date: 27 August 2007
  - ISBN 978-4-285-11514-7
  - Contains band score for songs in the FORCE album.
  - Includes a full length interview with band.
  - Includes bonus tabs for Yasegure.
- Entrance: Best of Lunkhead age 18-27 Band Score
  - Publishing Date: 4 September 2008
  - ISBN 978-4-285-11941-1
- Lunkhead Photograph Collection ”High Light”age25-27 Photographs by Katsuya Nishihara
