= Kamen Rider SD =

Japanese media franchise

仮面ライダーSD (Kamen Raidā Esu Dī)
- Genre: Action, comedy
- Created by: Shotaro Ishinomori
- Manga
- Written by: Kei Aoki, Hiroshi Katō, Takeshi Tamai, Minoru Nonaka, Yūji Hosoi
- Published by: DX Bombom, Comic Bom Bom, CoroCoro Comic, Terebi Land
- Magazine: Terebi Magazine
- Original run: January 1992 – December 1999
- Volumes: 22
- Original video animation

Kamen Rider SD: Strange!? Kumo Otoko
- Directed by: Takenori Kawada
- Produced by: Satoshi Kubo; Tatsuya Yoshida
- Music by: Akihiko Yoshida
- Studio: Toei Animation
- Released: January 23, 1993
- Runtime: 29 minutes

Kamen Rider SD (仮面ライダーSD, Kamen Raidā Esu Dī; Masked Rider Super Deformed) is the collective title for a series of media released in the 1990s that are based on Toei's popular Kamen Rider Series. It features super deformed versions of the various Kamen Riders featured from Kamen Rider through Black RX placed in a cartoonish world, where each enemy of the Riders has banded together under the command of the "Great Leader" under the name "Gran Shocker".

== Manga ==
The first Kamen Rider SD manga was Kamen Rider SD: Mighty Riders (仮面ライダーSD マイティライダーズ, Kamen Raidā Esu Dī Maiti Raidāzu) written by Kei Aoki and published in Comic BonBon's DX BonBon imprint. The next edition was Kamen Rider SD: Hurricane Legend (仮面ライダーSD 疾風伝説, Kamen Raidā Esu Dī Shippū Densetsu) written by Hiroshi Katō and was published in CoroCoro Comic from January 1992 through April 1993. Takeshi Tamai's Kamen Rider SD: Wild Running Smile School (仮面ライダーSD 爆走笑学校, Kamen Raidā Esu Dī Bakusō Shō Gakkō) was published in Shogakukan's family comic magazines. Minoru Nonaka's Kamen Rider SD was published in Telebi Land from October 1993 to February 1997. Kamen Rider SD: Bottakun (仮面ライダーSD ばっ太くん, Kamen Raidā Esu Dī Bottakun) by Yūji Hosoi has been published in Televi-Kun since December 1999.

== Video games ==
The first video game released under the Kamen Rider SD name was Kamen Rider SD: The Ambition of Gran Shocker (仮面ライダーSD グランショッカーの野望, Kamen Raidā Esu Dī Guran Shokkā no Yabō) for the Famicom on January 22, 1993. Kamen Rider SD: Sortie!! Rider Machines (仮面ライダーSD 出撃!!ライダーマシン, Kamen Raidā Esu Dī Shutsugeki!! Raidā Mashin) was released for the Super Famicom on July 9, 1993. The final video game released with the Kamen Rider SD characters was Kamen Rider SD: Run! Mighty Riders (仮面ライダーSD 走れ! マイティライダーズ, Kamen Raidā Esu Dī Hashire! Maiti Raidāzu) for the Game Boy on August 20, 1993.

== Animation ==
January 23, 1993, saw the release of an original video animation edition of Kamen Rider SD titled Kamen Rider SD: Strange!? Kumo Otoko (仮面ライダーSD 怪奇!?クモ男, Kamen Raidā Esu Dī Kaiki!? Kumo Otoko). The cast was based on the characters from the Hurricane Legend manga, with the main character being Black RX (voiced in the animation by Joe Onodera).

The titular theme song was performed by TOM of Tom Cat fame and the ending theme "Wasurekaketa Fairy Tale" (忘れかけた Fairy Tale) was performed by Hironobu Kageyama.
