= List of Galaxy Angel episodes =

A list of all Galaxy Angel episodes from the various seasons.

== Episodes ==
=== Galaxy Angel ===
No.	Title	Original release date	
1	"Resort-style Angel Preparation"; Transliteration: "Rizōto-fū Kōun-zutsumi Enjeru-jitate" (Japanese: リゾート風幸運包みエンジェル仕立て)	7 April 2001	TBA
The Angel Brigade's original purpose was to discover lost technology, but they end up doing household duties. Forte Stollen and Ranpha Franboise, part of the Angel Unit, has been sent to a beach resort to find Baron Fitzgerald III (a cat that was heir to a large family fortune). They find many cats that look like Baron III and capture them. However, the real Baron was with Milfeulle Sakuraba, a beach-side cafe waitress who calls it Goro (Rollie in the English version). As Milfeulle meets up with the other two angels, the assassins hired by a jealous relative come to take Baron away. Milfeulle tells them not to worry as luck is always on her side. Her luck puts the three angels in many close calls before the assassins are defeated. Baron dies at the end with offspring that become new heirs to the family fortune.
2	"Gamble Milfeulle Sauce"; Transliteration: "Gyanburu Poware Mirufīyu Sōsu" (Japanese: ギャンブルポワレミルフィーユソース)	14 April 2001	TBA
The Angel Brigade is supposed to welcome their newest member, but Forte and Ranpha have gone on a vacation to a casino. After many victories, the casino owner challenges Forte and Ranpha to a special roulette game of all in bet. The casino owner rigs the roulette game to make him win. Forte and Ranpha try to ask Mint for financial support, but Mint declines, resulting in Forte and Ranpha having to become wrestlers to pay off their debt. Milfeulle spots Forte and Ranpha in the ring and congratulates them. Forte recalls Milfeulle's luck and tries to get her to pay back the debt. The casino owner spots their winnings and challenges all three of them to another special roulette game. The casino owner again rigs the roulette game but Milfeulle's luck causes an asteroid to destroy the casino.
3	"Vanilla-flavored Asteroid Trash Stir-Fry"; Transliteration: "Asuteroido no Hiroimono Itame Vanira Fūmi" (Japanese: アステロイドの拾い物炒めヴァニラ風味)	21 April 2001	TBA
With the Angel Brigade having been assigned to sort trash, Vanilla found something strange, a missile. When they take the missile into their headquarters for investigation, the missile identifies to them as Normad. He starts talking to them about how he does not enjoy the life of being a missile and should enjoy a sense of freedom. As he is about to detonate, Vanilla stops the explosion and frees Normad, a microprocessor from the missile. The Brigade tries to find a new body for Normad which included a chess player, a dishwasher, and another missile. However, Normad picks Vanilla's stuffed animal and comments about Vanilla being his favorite.
4	"3 o'clock Delivery, Angel Combination Platter"; Transliteration: "Sanchi Chokusō Enjeru no Moriawase" (Japanese: 産地直送エンジェルの盛り合わせ)	12 May 2001	TBA
The Angel Brigade has been sent to protect the president of a company. Ranpha is initially excited because the president looks cute but is astonished when the president actually turns out to be an old man. As the president gives them a tour of the company, many incidents start to happen. Soon, an army of machines try to kill everyone. As the Angels attempt to stop the army of machines, Milfeulle and Ranpha begin to notice a red spaceship always following them. Forte also notices something suspicious and draws her gun towards the president saying that the whole situation is a trap. The president then reveals the truth. He tried to put them through a test to find a wife suitable for his son who is pictured Ranpha's photo. Initially interested in him, Ranpha turns him down after learning that they were only part of the hundreds of girls that qualify for the next round of elimination. The other Angels leave too.
5	"Pirate-style School Memory Terrine"; Transliteration: "Haikō no Terīnu Omoide-jikomi Kaizoku-fū" (Japanese: 廃校のテリーヌ思い出仕込み海賊風)	19 May 2001	TBA
In request of Duke Crizeman, Milfeulle and Ranpha are sent to return his student ID card to an abandoned school in Area Enigma, a dangerous area which is said to be infested with pirates. They are suddenly attacked by robots while in the school. One of the robots shoots a beam at Milfeulle's heart, seemingly killing her. Is Milfeulle really dead? What will Ranpha do now?
6	"Forte's Ruinous Stew and a Dash of Trouble"; Transliteration: "Forute no Iseki Nikomi Toraburu Zuke" (Japanese: フォルテの遺跡煮込みトラブル漬け)	26 May 2001	TBA
Forte, Milfeulle, and Normad are going to find lost technology on a planet. Milfeulle finds an egg and tries to cook it but the egg would not crack. The strange egg then hatches and a mouse comes out. Milfeulle and Normad learn that Forte is afraid of mice because of her allergies. The mouse torments Forte more by following her into a cave and blast a hole into her bazooka. Forte tries to attack the mouse but is stopped by Milfeulle who sees the mouse as cute and doesn't want it to get hurt. The mouse later grows and matures into a giant destructive rat and starts attacking everyone. Forte later learns that this rat is known to cause mass destruction but ends up finding a solution to keep the rat from attacking as she departs the planet with Milfeulle and Normad.
7	"Amusement Park Specialties with Chicken Mint Compote"; Transliteration: "Yūenchi Meibutsu Niwatori Konpōto Minto-zoe" (Japanese: 遊園地名物にわとりコンポートミント添え)	2 June 2001	TBA
Mint, Vanilla, and Milfeulle are sent to Chickendee Planet to find, and catch the kidnappers who have been kidnapping children. Everyone dresses up in costumes, and tries to find who the kidnappers are. Will they succeed? Strangely, a costume has mysteriously disappeared. Where is it?
8	"Milfeulle's All-Natural Syrupy Inspection"; Transliteration: "Tennen Mirufīyu no Sasatsu Ankake" (Japanese: 天然ミルフィーユの査察あんかけ)	9 June 2001	TBA
A commander and his helper have come to the Angel Base hoping to find lost technology thinking that the Angel Brigade found many and hid them secretly in their base. The commander is greeted by Milfeulle and Vanilla. He asks Milfeulle questions to where the lost technology is but Milfeulle keeps repeating the same answer that she doesn't know what lost technology is. The commander tries to befriend her hoping that she'll tell him where the lost technology is. The commander then asks Milfeulle her to show him and his helper everyone's rooms. They finally approach Mint's safe, thinking that the lost technology is inside. When Milfeulle opens up the safe, the commander enters the safe and fires Milfeulle and Vanilla as they have completed their duty. However, they become stuck inside the safe.
9	"Roast Beef of Lost Technology"; Transliteration: "Rosuto Tekunorojī no Rōsuto Bīfu" (Japanese: ロストテクノロジーのローストビーフ)	16 June 2001	TBA
The Angels board a derelict spaceship to look for the lost technology. The spaceship is apparently haunted as ghosts appear from nowhere and chase them around. They suddenly appear in another room where they are served with any desserts they want. Milfeulle, who stayed back at the Angel Base to exercise in the gym, is informed by the Commander that her probation is over and she is finally an official member of the Angel Brigade. Celebrations are cut short when they receive a help call from the other Angels. Milfeulle rushes to the spaceship and goes inside. As she too is chased by ghosts, they end up in front of a large screen with many numbers. As Mint tries to solve the mystery, Milfeulle blurts out that one row of numbers represent her current and ideal weight. Learning that the spaceship is a fitness machine, they must exercise with the ghosts to be free. Note: In the English Version, Volcott tells Milfeulle that her probation period is over while he tells her that her Emblem Frame has just arrived at the Angel Base in the Japanese Version
10	"Rouge-flavored Spring Rolls of Love"; Transliteration: "Koi no Shaoronpao Rūju Fūmi" (Japanese: 恋の小龍包ルージュ風味)	23 June 2001	TBA
A mis-delivered package arrives at the doorstep of a love-crazed Ranpha who has recently lost her former boyfriend Melty Way. It turns out to be an android lover from the Full Monty Company. Ranpha decides to return him just when Milfeulle enters her room and mistakes the doll as Ranpha's new boyfriend. Ranpha, initially rejects the android but later accepts him. As the other Angels get the news of a bomb threat resembling a man, Ranpha kisses the man causing him to detonate. It is later revealed that the doll (which was programmed to explode after the first kiss) was mailed by a stalker who targets women because he was once called a "lousy kisser". Further news revealed that many other women seeking love online were targeted as well.
11	"Gun Shot Bandage Roll Sushi Bowl"; Transliteration: "Hōtai Maki Jūdan Chirashizushi" (Japanese: 包帯巻き銃弾散らし寿司)	30 June 2001	TBA
In an Old West style town, Forte and Vanilla have been dispatched to search for Lost Technology. Forte and Vanilla both split their own ways with Vanilla working for the doctor of the local clinic. Forte joins three hospital workers across the street who gets no patients. One of them persuades Forte to run the doctor out of town by showing his gun collection and giving her the revolver as a reward. They hope this trick will help them get patients and earn money. However, the doctor is a kind-hearted man who is more interested in truly saving lives than earning money. When Forte storms into the clinic and attempts to raid, Normad makes Forte realize whose side is actually the corrupt side.
12	"Glazed Baseball and Negligee"; Transliteration: "Bēsubōru to Negurije no Gurasse" (Japanese: ベースボールとネグリジェのグラッセ)	7 July 2001	TBA
The Angels play a baseball game against the men from the Transbaal Navy. Due to Colonel Volcott's drunken stupor and a bet he made with the Admiral, they have to win the game or else they must wear negligees and be conscripted into the Navy if they lose. Initially, the Angels have a long losing streak, but Mint devised a way to give them a chance by bargaining for handicap points in exchange for Forte and Ranpha having to do special service if they lose. She also told made them all wear bikinis, throwing the Navy off guard. The Angels successfully make the first few bats, but the Admiral tries halt their victory when Milfeulle bats a home run ball. As Ranpha and the Admiral argue over cheating, a missile who is Normad's grandfather attacks the Admiral and Colonel Volcott while another missile who was Normad's girlfriend attacks all the Angels, ending the game in a stalemate.
13	"The Great Kidnapping Spectacle"; Transliteration: "Daiyūkai Mankan Zenseki" (Japanese: 大誘拐満漢全席)	14 July 2001	TBA
Mint and Ranpha were kidnapped during a mission and the kidnappers demand a large ransom in return. Unable to pay off the ransom, Forte and Milfeulle devise a plan to get the money by faking another kidnapping incident with Colonel Volcott. The military, in return, fakes another kidnapping to collect the money needed for ransom. As the cycle continues, it gets traced back to the original kidnappers. The original kidnappers increase the amount of ransom demanded from Forte and Milfeulle. Forte passes the increased amount of ransom along to the military, resulting in an endless cycle of ransom demands that skyrocket into the night.
14	"Downtown Soulfood ODEN"	21 July 2001	TBA
Forte befriends a juvenile delinquent girl named Milly who was the daughter of a crime boss. She tries to cheat out of paying for food before Forte sees her gun and notes something strange about Milly. As Forte witnesses another crime Milly is committing, Forte steals the gun away from Milly and withholds the gun until Milly listens to her. Milly leads Forte to her house and talks to Forte about her life. As Forte hears the story and looks at Milly's gun. she begins to relate Milly's story to similar events that occurred in her childhood. At the end, Forte gives her encouragement to change her lifestyle and returns the gun to her. Milly, now inspired, thanks Forte. Note: In this episode, Forte is the sole Angel to appear.
15	"Lost Item Pot-au-Feu"; Transliteration: "Otoshimono Potofu" (Japanese: 落としモノぽとふ)	28 July 2001	TBA
Vanilla allegedly loses a valuable item that she was carrying with her at all times. As a result, she has fasted for two weeks and hasn't eaten a bite since then. Unless the mysterious item can be found, Vanilla would not break her fast and will die of starvation. Ranpha uses her fortune-telling skills to uncover this mysterious item while Milfeulle attempts to find it. Each time, Milfeulle brings back rare and valuable treasures but Vanilla discards them. Suddenly, she picks up something from the trash scooped up by the janitor. Note: This episode features a parody of the German film Run Lola Run when Milfeulle runs down the hallway avoiding dogs and bullies.
16	"Grilled Girl in a Box"; Transliteration: "Gurirudo Hakoiri Musume" (Japanese: グリル·ド·箱入りムスメ)	4 August 2001	TBA
Forte comes back after a long mission, only to find that everyone believes she is dead! Apparently, Ranpha used Forte's "death" as an excuse for missing her date with a guy she likes, letting situation go out of hand. Ranpha bribes Forte with an antique gun to go through a fake funeral. When the funeral proceeds, Forte begins to feel better and realize that being dead is not too bad. However, Forte's funeral ends abruptly in a cheap graveyard as she only has few benefits after she dies. A higher-ranked official also died recently, making everyone turn their attention towards him. As Normad tries to explain all of her faults, which led to her few benefits, she tries to draw the gun at Normad, only to realize that they were actually toys.
17	"Canned Angel with Gun Turret"; Transliteration: "Enjeru Kanzume Hōtō Tsuki" (Japanese: エンジェル缶詰ほうとう付き)	11 August 2001	TBA
The Angels' new mission is capturing a runaway sentient tank. Milfeulle and Mint get on the tank as it rampages in the city. Has the sentient tank developed feelings of friendship for the two girls? Can the Angels successfully stop it?
18	"Monkey Salvage Combo"; Transliteration: "Saru no Sarubēji Konbo" (Japanese: サルのサルベージコンボ)	18 August 2001	TBA
Forte destroys her engine after pushing it too hard without breaking it in. Forte, Mint, and Vanilla find the nearest space station in an attempt to try to get Forte'e engine repaired. However, the space station appears to be abandoned with trash everywhere. As they continue to look for help, they find that the space station is occupied by monkeys. As Forte tries to contact the Angel Base about the station, Ranpha explains to them that the place was a laboratory where a viral outbreak devolved the occupants into monkeys. Forte, Mint and Vanilla try to get the monkeys back to Angel Base to find a cure for the monkeys. However, a surprise happens.
19	"Angel Kiss Gateau de Milfeulle"; Transliteration: "Enjeru Kissu Gatō de Mirufīyu" (Japanese: エンジェルキッス·ガトー·デ·ミルフィーユ)	25 August 2001	TBA
Lucky Milfeulle wins a free dinner at a fancy restaurant and brings Normad along as a date to teach her table manners. On the way there, they chance upon a pastry stall and Milfeulle is impressed with the delicious pastries. She finds the legendary Le Grande Asede, a rare pastry and sees a pastry robot behind the stall. She begs the pastry robot to teach her how to bake the cake but the robot's life is being threatened by assassins for discovering the owner's secret. She tries to rescue the robot despite the robot telling her to let go. They find a place to condone baking lessons but the assassins find the robot and kill it. However, the memory is intact and the owner's secret is leaked to the public. A replacement robot is also built by the Angels and is currently fulfilling many orders for the Le Grande Asede.
20	"Special Survival Combo"; Transliteration: "Tokumori Sabaibaru Teishoku" (Japanese: 特盛サバイバル定食)	1 September 2001	TBA
The military plane that Mint and Forte were travelling in crashes, stranding them in a deserted island. Mint and Forte team up with the island's sole resident Max to find ways to call for help. Max tries to use his radar antenna, but it emits a strong magnetic wave, causing more planes to crash and angering Forte as he is responsible for all the crashes. Forte and Mint try to rewire the radar antenna, but the antenna still does not function correctly. As Forte finds many weapons in Max's house, Mint restores the radar antenna and crashes more planes hoping to catch attention. She also crashes the Angel Base as well. In the end, Max was startling Forte, hoping to get a beating from her.
21	"Deco Pizza"	8 September 2001	TBA
Ranpha, Mint, and Vanilla go to a pizzeria which is open in late-night hours. However, the pizzeria is unexpectedly closed. Ranpha does not believe it and sneaks in. There, Ranpha falls in love with a cute boy, the owner of the pizzeria, who is drowning in debt. The Angels agree to help him; Ranpha makes the pizzas, Mint takes the orders, and Vanilla the deliveries. They also receive external assistance from other people such as truck drivers. After the pizzeria is saved, the owner lets Ranpha make her own pizza. Ranpha fills up her pizza with many spices burning everyone's mouths. As Ranpha tries to get a glass of water, she accidentally opens a gas valve, exploding the pizzeria and putting the owner out of business for good.
22	"Board Girl Special Secret Friend Roll"; Transliteration: "Kanban Musume Tokusei Himitsu no Tsutsumiyaki" (Japanese: 看板娘特製秘密の包み焼き)	15 September 2001	TBA
During the search for the lost technology, Mint gets stuck in a cutboard figure on top of the mountain viewing area. Meanwhile the mountain is sinking into the sea. As the other Angels try to make their way up the mountain, Mint is embarrassed to be seen inside a cutboard figure and tries to misguide them in an attempt to prevent them from reaching the top. Meanwhile, Mint realizes that the scene is odd as the birds are not flying away. She asks a passer by questions, but he turns away. Mint finally lands on the passer by, freeing herself from cutboard figure. She spots a remote control and uses it to raise the mountain out of the sea and reveal an illegal and secret factory underneath the mountain.
23	"Pitch Black Laughing Pepper"; Transliteration: "Yaminabe Owarai Peppā" (Japanese: 闇鍋お笑いペッパー)	22 September 2001	TBA
The Angels are approached by Mr. God, a retired comedian who tries to make Vanilla laugh. He failed to do so in his last show despite everyone else laughing, resulting in an accident. Resolving to retire, he has hired many comedians who are renowned for the amounts of laughter they can draw up to get Vanilla to laugh. The comedians undergo extreme training before they are qualified to work for Mr. God. However, none of them are able to get Vanilla to do as much as a giggle.
24	"Tear-flavored Missile Rice Bowl"; Transliteration: "Gekimori Misairu-don Mokkori Namida Aji" (Japanese: 激盛ミサイル丼もっこり涙味)	29 September 2001	TBA
The human race is being attacked by its mysterious arch-enemy, a giant dice named Kyutaro. As the Angels try to attack Kyutaro, the dice is invulnerable to any human attack and easily defeats the Angels. Normad explains to them the details of Kyutaro and how the missile he was originally from is their weakness. The Angels reluctantly agree to return Normad and express their grievances as the missile destroys Kyutaro. However, Normad surprises them by speaking out afterwards explaining that the Commander made a copy of a program which allowed Normad to navigate the missile from a distance and not be sacrificed. Forte is displeased and shoots at Normad. Later, more Kyutaros arrive, requiring additional missiles and copies of Normad's program.
25	"Angel Dark Space Chazuke"; Transliteration: "Datenshi no Ankoku Uchū Chazuke" (Japanese: 堕天使の暗黒宇宙茶漬け)	TBA	TBA
The Angels are filing their expense reports when the Commander informs them that the Milfeulle who has been with them all this time is a fake. The Commander has her arrested and shows the official profile of Milfeulle with an old and wrinkled face. The other Angels believe this was a mistake and try to free the imprisoned Milfeulle. As they successfully get Milfeulle free, another Milfeulle shows up. Vanilla does a DNA analysis and finds out she is the real Milfeulle. Milfeulle also explains that she had measles on the day of photo, resulting in such photo. The other angels realized they let the fake Milfeulle escape. The fake Milfeulle thanks them for freeing her and informs that there are other Angel imposters around.
26	"Five Sukiyaki Lunchboxes"; Transliteration: "Sukiyaki Bentō Go-nin Mae" (Japanese: スキヤキ弁当五人前)	TBA	TBA
The Angel's last mission is escorting the mysterious client Johnny in a truck through a desert wilderness. As each Angel takes turns to drive, Ranpha becomes jealous as she loses to other Angels in deciding who goes next. As the other Angels drive with Johnny sitting in the front, Johnny recites words that always relates to their interests (such as costumes for Mint). Ranpha becomes more jealous hoping to meet up with Johnny in personal. When it's finally Ranpha's turn, she focuses so much on Johnny that she accidentally causes the truck to crash. Johnny then wakes up, revealing that he was unconscious about his speech the whole time. The Angels finish the escort mission by foot.

=== Galaxy Angel Z ===
No.	Title	Original release date	
1	"Angel Challenge Jelly Trial"; Transliteration: "Tenshi no Charenji zerī toraiaru" (Japanese: 天使のチャレンジゼリートライアル)	3 February 2002	TBA
While chowing down at a ramen stand, Milfeulle (who is carrying Lost Technology that resembles pepper in a shaker) accidentally turns her fellow Angels invisible with it. Even worse, the Angels now have a new mission--to locate money stolen by crooks hiding out at a supposedly haunted house. Can they stop the crooks? Will the Angels become visible again?
2	"Muscle Bound Broad Noodles"; Transliteration: "Kinniku Ryūryū Tantanmen" (Japanese: 筋肉隆々担担麺)	3 February 2002	TBA
At a pro wrestling arena, Ranpha meets a handsome muscular wrestler who claims he knew her when they were children. She immediately falls in love with him and is unable to concentrate on the match. Who is this man? Can Ranpha recover her memories of him?
3	"Quick Note, Ballotine of Sigh"; Transliteration: "Zenryaku tame iki no Barodīnu" (Japanese: 前略 ため息のバロディーヌ)	10 February 2002	TBA
During a mission, Milfeulle takes a detour to help an old man deliver a tsuchinoko kigurumi for a festival. Mint, displaced from her seat by the traveler, finds the box in the cargo bay containing the costume and helps herself. When she finds she cannot get it off and is left alone on the destination planet by Milfeulle, she is mistaken for a real life tsuchinoko by the locals.
4	"Surprise Dim Sum"; Transliteration: "Bikkuri Tenshin" (Japanese: びっくり点心)	10 February 2002	TBA
While baking, Milfeulle finds some sweet chestnuts and decides to include them in her cake. The rest of the Angels return after learning that the chestnuts they just brought back from a mission are a lost technology. Milfuelle is discovered to have eaten them already and grown to sizable proportions. The troupe tries desperately to shrink her back to a manageable size before Commander Volcott finds out. As they try many methods to help out Milfeulle, Milfeulle declines and causes earthquakes. The Angels are then treated to the chestnut cake, growing them to sizable proportions as well. Volcott finds out, but Mint found a solution in which to simply enlarge the base and everyone else.
5	"Memory Rally Chop Suey"; Transliteration: "Omoide Gekisō Happōsai" (Japanese: 想い出激走八宝菜)	17 February 2002	TBA
Ranpha and Milfeulle travel to a planet to investigate a lost technology, but decide to take part in a Takeshi's Castle type show instead. Ranpha does well, yet her successes are dogged by a long lost robot acquaintance.
6	"Deep Fog Sorbet"; Transliteration: "Tachikomeru kiri no Sorube" (Japanese: 立ちこめる霧のソルベ)	17 February 2002	TBA
Mint and Vanilla carry out a very important mission in which they must protect a bag in their possession. They arrive on a planet draped in mysterious fog. The planet's inhabitants take suspicious interest in their luggage. As Mint tries to keep the bag away and run, she find inhabitants and the police everywhere, trying to take the bag. Mint and Vanilla finally gets quartered at the junkyard with TV screens pointing at their bag. Vanilla takes the bag and opens it, revealing a flash that sends them back to the time when Mint and Vanilla are still traveling in their Emblem Frames. Mint thinks everything that happened was only a dream until she and Vanilla begin to enter deep fog and land on the same planet seen earlier.
7	"Deep Fried Egg Rolls of Love"; Transliteration: "Koi no Nikogori Junjō Tsutsumiage" (Japanese: 恋の煮こごり純情包み揚げ)	24 February 2002	TBA
Commander Huey, no relation to Commander Volcott, has a reunion with his old command: the Fairy Unit. As the now elderly women bicker and fuss, Huey reminisces about a dangerous mission they had once embarked on and how much he misses the now absent Spiphy. As the elderly women become too tired, Spiphy arrives, apologizing for being late to the party. Commander Huey chooses to leave the other elderly women behind and go out with Spiphy.
8	"Wedding Cake Combiner Special"; Transliteration: "Wedingu Kēki Gattai Supesharu" (Japanese: ウェディングケーキ合体スペシャル)	24 February 2002	TBA
The Angels have been chosen to pilot a new weapons platform resembling a voltron which requires all five pilots to be fully trusting of one another. Ranpha, however, has accepted the proposal from the man of her dreams and has quit the Angels. When a dangerous enemy approaches, the troupe must find a replacement for Ranpha or convince her to give up happiness for the sake of saving the world. The Angels try Volcott and Normad to represent Ranpha, but the transformation of the voltron fails. Meanwhile, Ranpha began to miss the Angels and cancels the wedding to go back to the Angels. With all Angels reunited, the transformation still fails, making Volcott reveal a backup that made the transformation unnecessary.
9	"GA Happiness quest" Transliteration: "GA Kaiseki Kaiseki" (Japanese: GA解析懐石)	3 March 2002	TBA
A gang of bandits resembling the Angels rob the corrupt Dream Foundation's vaults of cash. Two of the military's top brass come to investigate. They are soon transfixed by Commander Huey's brilliant maneuvering in bringing the culprits to justice.
10	"Served to Taste Revenge Lunch"; Transliteration: "Okonomi ♥ Fukushū Ranchi" (Japanese: お好み♥復讐ランチ)	3 March 2002	TBA
With their soap opera's reception broken, the Angels send Vanilla out into space to repair the antenna. During the excursion, she is struck by lightning and killed. Normad, enraged, seeks revenge for his lost love on the remaining Angels at all costs. He transforms into a huge monster and strangles all of the other Angels forcing them to beg for mercy. As the Angels get tortured, they began to start speaking good words at him. Normad stops when Milfeulle points out Vanilla still moving. She appear to be dead because the space suit she was wearing became unresponsive after the lightning. Normad frees the other Angels and ridicules them for their personality with respect to Vanilla, causing the Angels to attack him.
11	"Revolving Sushi to the Hereafter"; Transliteration: "Higan e no Kaitenzushi" (Japanese: 彼岸への回転寿司)	10 March 2002	TBA
One morning, the members of the Angel Brigade began switching bodies with each other (and Col. Volcott). Mint theorizes that it has something to do with the Lost Technology they were able to obtain from a previous mission. Now, they have another mission to do: Stop a biker gang from causing trouble in a downtown area. The mission is a success thanks to Forte (in Milfeulle's body), but the next morning, one of the gang members break out of prison searching for Milfeulle. As the lost technology keeps switching the bodies around, the gang members becomes involved as well. Later, a team destroys the lost technology when studies showed that the device was meant to send souls to heaven. Everyone finds halos above their head.
12	"Steel Jambalaya"; Transliteration: "Hagane no Janbaraya" (Japanese: 鋼のジャンバラヤ)	10 March 2002	TBA
Forte is haunted by memories of a lost technology battle droid that she and Commander Volcott encountered long ago on a mission that killed most of their team and nearly killed her as well. When another droid is discovered, she and Volcott are sent to face it and their past.
13	"In-Flight Meal (Excuses Curry Loaded with Ingredients)"; Transliteration: "Kinaishoku (Gudakusan Benkai Karē)" (Japanese: 機内食(具沢山弁解カレー))	17 March 2002	TBA
The Angel Brigade is returning home from a successful mission where they were able to stop the activation of the "Ultimate Planet-Destroying Bio-Weapon." Still, none of them can understand how they managed to stop it. Who in the Angel Brigade gave the fatal blow? What will be the consequences for their actions?
14	"Love and Double Fried Cabbage Cake"; Transliteration: "Ai to Giwaku no Monja" (Japanese: 愛と疑惑のもんじゃ)	17 March 2002	TBA
Normad is kidnapped by a stranger who finds him cute and valuable. Vanilla demands the stranger to return Normad but the stranger refuses. As Vanilla relentlessly chases the kidnapper, the stranger continuously tries many tricks to defeat Vanilla. Normad also believes that the stoic, green-haired Angel actually cares for him. Eventually, the kidnapper becomes exhausted and gives up on the pursuit and is defeated by Vanilla in her angelic form as she retrieves Normad.
15	"Fresh Catch; Miraculous Boat-Wrap Sushi"; Transliteration: "Shinsen Toretate Kyōi no Funamori" (Japanese: 新鮮とれたて驚異の舟盛り)	24 March 2002	TBA
The Angels go to a resort planet for vacation and it seems they can receive a large amount of money for catching a monstrous fish. Forte wants the prize money while Milfeulle plans to cook the fish for a meuniere dinner. However, Mint does not believe it is possible to catch the fish and wants Forte to call it off but Forte refuses. Things go awry when the giant fish knocks over their rented boat, damaging the radio (so now they cannot call for help) and the fishing mechanism, trapping Forte in it. The other Angels decide to inflate a raft and abandon her on the boat just when the fish is returning for another attack. Forte stops the fish, but the fish drags the boat and Forte and damages another rented boat.
16	"Forbidden Meuniere; Alluring Grated Yam Topping"; Transliteration: "Kindan no Munierru Miwaku no yama kake" (Japanese: 禁断のムニエル魅惑の山かけ)	24 March 2002	TBA
The Angel Brigade's mission this time is to protect the "Mock Sunfish", an endangered species. This animal turns out to be the main ingredient used to make a beauty product guaranteed to keep one's skin looking eternally youthful. Realizing this, Forte, Ranpha, and Mint decide to capture one. Milfuelle, however, disagrees, saying the mock sunfish should be protected. On the planet's surface, Milfeulle happens upon a mock sunfish which the other Angels try to hunt. She runs into many traps and gets sunburned. The other Angels eventually kill the sunfish and start their feast. Milfeulle apologizes to the sunfish about failing to protect him, causing the dead sunfish to disappear and give Milfeulle beauty skin.
17	"Moon-View Soba sans Moon"; Transliteration: "Tsuki nashi tsukimi soba" (Japanese: ツキなし月見そば)	31 March 2002	TBA
It's Milfeulle's day off and she plans to go hiking in the Transbaal area so she can see the flowering fields of the summit meadow. This also happens to be the one day when her misfortune takes over from her usual good luck. The more Milfeulle is plagued by misfortune, the more a galactic cataclysm is bound to happen. To prevent such occurrences, the Angel Brigade must prevent any stressful influences until Milfeulle goes to sleep again. As Milfeulle began her day off, she encounters many problems such as a ripped dress, a late bus, and an urbanized summit meadow. Forte and the others quickly fix up all the problems. In the end, Milfeulle goes to sleep happy about her day off.
18	"A Never Before Seen Mystery Carpaccio"; Transliteration: "Dare mo Mita koto no nai Nazo no Karupaccho" (Japanese: 誰も見たことのない謎のカルパッチョ)	31 March 2002	TBA
The Angels are provided with new uniforms from HQ which seem to give them new superhuman powers. Soon though, their new abilities begin to take a toll on their friendship.
19	"Gun Smoke & Tobacco Smoke Cassoulet"; Transliteration: "Shōen to Shien no Kasure" (Japanese: 硝煙と紫煙のカスレ(TV未放映話))	TBA	TBA
Forte suddenly asks for leave for the day, leaving the Angels, Ranpha in particular, thinking she's off for a date. Meanwhile, Forte meets up with an old acquaintance who wants to ask her opinion on a rather pressing matter of life and death.

=== Galaxy Angel A/AA ===
Galaxy Angel A and AA are both considered to be Galaxy Angel series three. Aside from their openings and endings, there is no difference between them and their episode numbers do not reset after the change.

==== Galaxy Angel A ====
No.	Title	Original release date	
1	"Old Man Detective Novel Rice Porridge"; Transliteration: "Sōsaku oyaji-fū sōsaku ojiya" (Japanese: 捜索おやじ風創作おじや)	6 October 2002	TBA
The Angel Brigade has disbanded due to mistrust and hostility arising after someone made off with their steamed bun snacks. A new unit, the Twin Stars, consisting of brothers Kokomo and Maribu, have taken their place and have performed many achievements unseen by the Angel Brigade. When their Commander Mary informs Volcott that he is to be forcibly retired as he is no longer useful, he tries to reunite the Angels. As he reunites the Angels, he reveals to each Angel that he was responsible for the steamed bun snacks incident causing the Angels to torture him first.
2	"Original Angel Parfait with the Works"; Transliteration: "Ganso enjeru pafe zenbu-iri" (Japanese: 元祖エンジェルパフェ全部入り)	6 October 2002	TBA
After Volcott convinced the Angels to reunite, Milfeulle wins the lottery and splits the winnings. However, the Twin Stars vacuum their money all up when capturing a lost technology that broke loose. The Angels break the vacuum to take back the money, freeing the lost technology as well. After an argument with the Twin Stars, the Angels disband again. As Volcott is forced to retire once more, the lost technology destroys the ceremony and the city. The Angels reunite again with heavy incentives and try to work with the Twin Stars to capture the lost technology. However, Kokomo and Malibu taunt Forte and Ranpha, resulting in them attacking the Twin Stars instead and placing the Angel Brigade on the wanted list.
3	"Shuffle French without Dessert"; Transliteration: "Shaffuru furenchi dezāto nuki" (Japanese: シャッフルフレンチ・デザート抜き)	13 October 2002	TBA
The military is not convinced that they should pay for both the Angel Brigade and the Twin Stars and convenes a meeting to decide the matter. Milfeulle, late for the conference, suddenly trips. As the presiding officer becomes impatient over Milfeulle's tardiness, Volcott decides to cover for her. Matters become complicated when the officer calls Volcott for testimony. Another Angel tries to cover for Volcott and the cycle repeats until everyone is dressed as someone else. In the end, Kokomo and Malibu becomes dressed as members of the Angel Brigade. With all the Angel Brigade members in place, the officer finally agrees to start the meeting. Later, it is shown that after Milfeulle tripped, she fell asleep.
4	"Special Appetizer without Main Dish"; Transliteration: "Supesharu zensai mein disshu nuki" (Japanese: スペシャル前菜・メインディッシュ抜き)	13 October 2002	TBA
Kokomo does not like being treated as a child despite being one. Using the fact that they work and train hard compared to the Angel Brigade, Kokomo feels that they deserve more respect. Kokomo finally has it when he is forced to eat a nutrious lunch and storms out the door. Maribu tries to help clam him down after an altercation with Commander Mary but is interrupted by an attack from a lost technology that divides to fill up space. The Twin Stars try to contain the chaos under control and gain the respect of their commander but fail after the Angel Brigade shows up and teleports everything including Malibu and Kokomo to the neighboring planet and receives praise for saving the day.
5	"Deluxe Milfeulle Surprise Sandwich"; Transliteration: "Tokusei mirufīyu no bikkurisando" (Japanese: 特製ミルフィーユのビックリサンド)	20 October 2002	TBA
The Angels are dispatched to a dying planet to retrieve a book of wisdom before it is destroyed. However, only Milfeulle's Emblem Frame is operational and all the Angels have to travel in her Frame. After a near crash landing, Milfeulle is left to stand guard and charged with not getting into trouble. Being Milfeulle though, she gets her head stuck in a wall while chasing a squirrel. As the other Angels are ready to leave, they find Milfeulle stuck and desperately try to save her before the planet explodes knowing that only she can pilot her Frame. As they try many methods to break Milfeulle free, Milfeulle's luck causes a headstone to destroy the wall and free her. On the way home, Milfeulle gets her Frame stuck.
6	"Hug Hug Fish Pot"; Transliteration: "Hagu hagu hagu nabe" (Japanese: はぐはぐハグ鍋)	20 October 2002	TBA
The Angels are dispatched to a planet where all the inhabitants, both flora and fauna, repay kindness with hugs. As Forte and Milfeulle both experience such hugs, Forte becomes freightened by it and tries to get Milfeulle to leave with her. However, Milfeulle sees more trouble and wants to help. Forte devises a clever plan to help out where they can while not getting hugged by wearing masks and disguising as other members on the Angel Base. Eventually, everyone including the Twin Stars and the commanders, gets hugged. With all of the troubles fixed, Forte and Milfeulle pull out something looking like a lost technology and leaves. Upon their departure, the entire planet hugs Forte and Milfeulle for pulling the thorn out.
7	"Chilled Mackerel with a Prize"; Transliteration: "Hiya-sei rotosaba atari-tsuki" (Japanese: 冷製ロトサバ当たりつき)	27 October 2002	TBA
On a war torn planet, the Angels, sans Milfeulle, become trapped in a cave with no provisions. While waiting for their compatriot to rescue them, they learn via radio that they have won the lottery. The four Angels and Normad must fight for survival and sanity as hopes of rescue fade fast. As starvation becomes too severe, Vanilla began to eat the fibers from Normad. The other Angels share the fibers as well. The eating continues until the CPU of Normad gets exposed. Later, Milfeulle frees them. The other Angels plan to take a vacation and celebrate their lottery winnings, but Volcott informs that the economy has plummeted due to failure of the mission, making their winnings worthless.
8	"Slippery Pasta"; Transliteration: "Tsurutsuru pasuta" (Japanese: つるつるパスタ)	27 October 2002	TBA
Mint is assigned to find the papers in the storage locker. While rummaging inside, Mint discovers an adorable duck mask. However, the mask is a lost technology and dissolves all her hair when she activates it. While looking up the information, Normad finds out, prompting Mint to go along with Normad. As the other Angels try to question about her coverup mask (a paper bag), she digresses and wards their off. Mint and Normad locate all the masks in the storage locker, hoping to find out that restores her hair. As she tests out each mask, the other Angels become impatient and demand explanations for Mint's delay. As they approach the storage locker, they find that Mint's face has nothing on.
9	"Overpriced Salad Bar"; Transliteration: "Botta kuri sarada bā" (Japanese: ぼったくりサラダバー)	3 November 2002	TBA
Out of snacks and water en route back from a mission, Ranpha stops at a planet for drinks. She encounters a malfunctioning, but well-meaning robot shop keeper and manages to get what she came for. However, when trying to pay with a currency the robot doesn't know, it lashes out at Ranpha, suspecting her to be a thief. Ranpha tries to escape in her Angel Frame, but the robot destroy it making it inoperable. After a long grueling fight, the robot runs out of power and recharges. After the recharge, the robot resets and Ranpha's bill is wiped clean. Ranpha tries to call for help but destroys the telephone when Kokomo answers it. As Ranpha waits for help to arrive, she accidentally drinks bottled water incurring another charge.
10	"Angel Banana Discount"; Transliteration: "Enjeru banana no tatakiuri" (Japanese: エンジェルバナナのたたき売り)	3 November 2002	TBA
The Angel Brigade decides to take on a private contractor for an employer for five times their military pay. They eagerly accept the seemingly menial tasks they are assigned, but are shocked to discover that with five times the pay comes at least five times the work. As the work becomes too grueling, Forte quits her task. In the end, the manager evaluates their overall result and finds that each Angel has caused additional damage with Milfeulle using her money to buy counterfeits, Vanilla luring a snow eel home, Mint dumping trash in her backyard, and Forte bring a plant to life. Ranpha appears to have done her task successfully until the pirate fleet shows up and attacks the manager. The Angel Bridge quickly leaves.
11	"Painful Walnut Pie"; Transliteration: "Yamitsuki kurumi pai" (Japanese: 病みつきクルミパイ)	10 November 2002	TBA
Mint is told by her physician that she has a possibly terminal illness: the kigurumi disease. If she does not want to die, she must never wear one ever again. Her comrades, hearing she is in the hospital, bring Mint gifts that they are sure will cheer her up. When the visits fail to raise Mint's sprits, she goes with them on a mission to a planet. To her dismay, the day of their arrival coincides with the centennial kigurumi festival. As the other Angels convince Mint to put on a kigurumi, Mint runs and eventually collapses. She wakes up to find that the Angels have put a kigurumi on. Mint ignores the physician's advice. Afterwards, the same physician tells Forte she has the weapons disease.
12	"Angel Hotchpotch Taste Test"; Transliteration: "Tenshi no gottani-mi kurabe" (Japanese: 天使のごった煮 味くらべ)	10 November 2002	TBA
The military is holding a Miss Female Soldier competition and all the Angels participate. As the judges are first convinced by Milfeulle's cooking, the other Angels all try to woo the judges with their expertise, each in turn undermining the others and resulting a deduction for Milfeulle. The judges finally take the Angels outside to complete their assessment. Each Angel continues to compete with each other until a new mission is called. They decide to take the judges with them on a mission to show them the true face of the Angel Brigade. During the mission, the Angels end up finding a female soldier capable of doing all of their expertise and hobby perfectly. She has rifles, pastry, and even an attractive body.
13	"Ultra Rare Fortune Cookie"; Transliteration: "Geki rea fōchun kukkī" (Japanese: 激レア フォーチュンクッキー)	17 November 2002	TBA
After an easy mission the Angels look forward to relaxing. However, Ranpha taunts Milfeulle about her unfinished duties, causing a wormhole to swallow them up and deposit them on an uninhabited planet in an unknown region of space. The five must work together to survive even though discord erupts frequently when they attempt to use Milfeulle's luck to get them home. Milfeulle slowly becomes accustomed to the new life, but Ranpha, still unhappy about the new life, continues to push Milfeulle. Forte joins Ranpha and devises a plan to get Milfeulle to change her perception about the place by becoming criminals. As they try to rob Milfeulle and the other Angels, the other Angels block and scare them away.
14	"Ultra Hot Kid's Meal"; Transliteration: "Gekikara okosama ranch" (Japanese: 激辛 お子さまランチ)	17 November 2002	TBA
The Twin Star team leaves a lost technology at the closed reception desk in a hurry to get ice cream. Passing by, Ranpha finds it and, mistaking it for a box of uirou, brings it to a meeting. When the Angels are all turned into children, Kokomo and Maribu must try to fix the situation before either of the two commanders discovers their blunder. As Kokomo and Maribu try to round up all the children and find a fix on their own, the children, especially Forte, play pranks on them and hide from being caught. The children are very clever, easily defeating Kokomo and Maribu. When they enter the conference room, the find out that the two commanders have turned into children as well. The two commanders both engage in play fights.
15	"Good-bye to Our Steaming Teapot"; Transliteration: "Sayonara boku-ra no dobin mushi" (Japanese: さよならぼくらの土瓶蒸し)	24 November 2002	TBA
In a re-imagining of "The Emperor's New Clothes", Milfeulle and Vanilla are sent to a planet where the prince has a funny face. Unable to help herself, Milfeulle laughs at him at first sight and is jailed. Vanilla must try every trick in the book to help save her friend before she is executed.
16	"Mustached Beef Rib Rice Bowl with Rich Sauce"; Transliteration: "Hige-tsuki karubi donburi koi kuchi sōsu" (Japanese: ヒゲ付きカルビ丼こい口ソース)	24 November 2002	TBA
While carrying a box of lost technology, Commander Volcott and Forte stumble causing it to release its contents. The next morning they discover that they have changed genders. Forte is initially unhappy with the gender change and gets criticize for the respect of women, but gets used to it. While they are more than comfortable with their new identities, Ranpha develops new and confusing feelings for her teammate. As Ranpha's desire for love explodes, Ranpha falls in love with Forte. Forte tries to escape only to find Ranpha lurking everywhere. When Ranpha marries Forte, Forte crashes the wedding by using the box and changing everyone's gender, including Ranpha.
17	"Pour, Ambitious, Chilled Sesame Chicken"; Transliteration: "Yabō binbō bōbō Niwatori" (Japanese: 野望貧乏棒々鶏)	1 December 2002	TBA
Vanilla and Normad are left penniless on the side of the road selling trinkets to survive. Before long, a scientist offers to take her home if she will but help him save the world from his evil brother's monster robot. When the brother shows up, he has with him the remainder of the Angel Brigade who have teamed up with him to take over the world. Vanilla must choose between her friends and her duty.
18	"A String of Handmade Noodles with No Connection"; Transliteration: "Juzutsunagi teuchi soba tsunagi nashi" (Japanese: 数珠つなぎ手打ちそばつなぎなし)	1 December 2002	TBA
The Angels are found to be dangling from the edge of a cliff, a single breath away from plummeting to their deaths. In typical Angel fashion, they soon turn to blaming each other for getting them into this predicament by recounting the events from earlier in the day. Earlier in the day, the Angel Brigade were at a picnic enjoy a new food from Milfeulle. However, due to their clumsiness, the food bounced off the edge of the cliff. Each Angel tries to catch it, making them fall over and leading to the current situation. The blame game becomes worse, eventually leading to a fight between the Angels. Milfeulle finally stops the fight, but gets too excited over the song the Angels were singing, reverting to them dangling.
19	"Bamboo-Cutter Platter"; Transliteration: "Take to gozen" (Japanese: 竹取御膳)	8 December 2002	TBA
The Angels are sent to a war zone to help the outgunned soldiers. However, Ranpha cannot be bothered once she discovers a baby in a bamboo grove. After hearing her tale, the rest of the Angels acquire their own babies and turn the base into a nursery. Forte initially does not accept, but gives in after Vanilla gives Forte a baby. As the Angels nurture the babies, Volcott accidentally spoils the fact that these bamboo babies are short-lived. When the bamboo babies have appeared to die, the Angels feel sad until they saw that the bamboo babies have grown up with new babies in hand. The Angels take care of the new babies and the cycle repeats, causing the soldiers to lose their patience and retaliate.
20	"Wandering Cat Food"; Transliteration: "Samayoeru neko manma" (Japanese: さまよえるねこまんま)	8 December 2002	TBA
Mint has lost her cat and Milfeulle has lost her wallet. Ranpha, using her new book on hypnosis, tries to help Milfeulle remember where she last had her billfold. Mint quickly realizes that the book was not on hypnosis but on summoning the dead. Now the spirit of her cat has taken over Milfeulle's body must to the delight of Mint and the fright of everyone else.
21	"Frequently Ordered Sushi"; Transliteration: "Chūmon no ōi sushi" (Japanese: 注文の多い寿司)	15 December 2002	TBA
The Angels, angry by their meager salary packets decide to drown their sorrows by going to a sushi dojo. The curator, an octopus, challenges them to a fight when Forte, Ranpha, and Mint become obstinate. They accept, but he refuses to then share the rules with them.
22	"Fortuitous Family Set"; Transliteration: "Tana kara bota mochi famirī setto" (Japanese: 棚からボタ餅ファミリーセット)	15 December 2002	TBA
One of the richest men in the country announces that, due to her helping him in a pinch not knowing he was wealthy, he would like Ranpha to become his adopted daughter. Ranpha quickly takes advantage of the situation, first spending money to upgrade her unit and her Emblem Frame. Then, Ranpha promotes herself to leader and bosses the other Angels around. When a mission is assigned, Ranpha orders the other Angels and Volcott to do the mission for her. Making poor decisions, the Angels get caught and fail the mission. The richest man then announces that they made a mistake in identifying the person leaving Ranpha alone. However, the tribe that captured the Angels quickly adopts Ranpha, making her the princess of the tribe.
23	"All-You-Can-Eat Juicy Yakiniku"; Transliteration: "Jūjū yakiniku tabe-hōdai" (Japanese: 重々焼き肉食べ放題)	22 December 2002	TBA
Milfeulle awakes to find herself the lowest ranking member of an efficient and well disciplined Angel Brigade, ranking even blow Normad who is now a stuffed rabbit. When none of their usual favorites can incite them to break protocol, Milfeulle realizes that this is not her Angel Brigade and wakes up, discovering it was all a dream. However, each time Milfeulle wakes up, she sees a different Angel Brigade including the idol unit, the basketball team, and the miniature-sized Brigade. Back in the real world, the other Angel Brigade are bombarded by different Milfeulles from different dreams. Ranpha blamed Milfeulle for using a lost technology as her pillow.
24	"Glitter Clunk Mixed Juice"; Transliteration: "Giragiragān no mikkusujūsu" (Japanese: ギラギラガーンのミックスジュース)	22 December 2002	TBA
Ranpha sets up the Angels for a mass date so she can home in on a handsome air force pilot. As the others date their dates, Forte is not excited about her having to date an octopus despite the octopus falling in love with Forte. The octopus also eats mice which intensifies Forte's fear. Ranpha tries to settle the dispute by playing the "King Game" where one person can order anyone else to do something. The game starts out well but Volcott accidentally reveals Forte's number when the octopus is the "King". The octopus gives a command for Forte to kiss him but Forte runs away the mass date. Ranpha takes the air force pilot at the end.
25	"Junk Ramen, Extra Noodles Available"; Transliteration: "Ponkotsu rāmen kaedama ari" (Japanese: ポンコツラーメン替え玉有り)	29 December 2002	TBA
Milfeulle is trying to make a cake for a cooking competition and the rest of the Angels covertly assist her, hoping for a piece of the billion gala prize. When it is discovered they are four eggs short they send Vanilla out to get some more, but Vanilla doesn't seem her usual self. In fact, she seems more like a robot.
26	"Continuously Pushed Sweet Red Bean Soup"; Transliteration: "Oshimakuri★ o shiruko" (Japanese: おしまくり★おしるこ)	29 December 2002	TBA
The Angel Brigade bring back a lost technology that resembles a button. Despite their will power, they end up pushing the unmarked button to see what it does. As Milfeulle is desperate to see what the button does, Forte stops her saying that it is their duty to protect the lost technology from being activated. Milfeulle presses it and receives a cooking pan. Normad also presses the button and receives a rug for Vanilla. Vanilla receives a prayer from god. Forte, Ranpha, and Mint begin to realize the amazement; it seems as if they will receive whatever their greatest desire is. Forte, Ranpha, and Mint become greedy and try to fight for the button to receive their desires. However, there is a price.

==== Galaxy Angel AA ====
Note: Series AA is still part of Galaxy Angel series three. The only difference is the OP/ED.
** Most English episodes have an alternate title that a voice actor (usually Milfeulle's) says at the starting title "menu" of each episode.

No.	Title	Original release date	
27	"Pyuru-riku Magical Steak" **"SAME TITLE"; Transliteration: "Pyuru riku majikaru sutēki" (Japanese: ピュルリクマジカルステーキ)	5 January 2003	TBA
A piece of lost technology arrives under heavy guard to the Angel Brigade's headquarters, they having been charged with protecting it. The lost technology is revealed to be a magical girl wand which will allow the user to use real magic so long as they believe with their whole heart that they can actually use magic while reciting the magic spell. The spell proves too embarrassing for any Angel to try to use it. However, curiosity and the quest for magic help them unite and overcome their embarrassment to reveal their true potential. The wand activates and prints a photo of them reciting the spell. The same soldiers come to take the embarrassing photo and the wand away for investigation, resulting in a war waged by the Angels.
28	"Baum-kuhen to Worry Over" **"Worrisome Baum Kuchen"; Transliteration: "Ki ni naru baumukūhen" (Japanese: 気になるバウムクーヘン)	5 January 2003	TBA
Mint and Ranpha are stuck for the night on a planet. To pass the time, Mint eats some snacks Ranpha found earlier. In the morning she finds that the nuts she ate have turned her into a tree kami. Even though the locals now worship her as a deity, being a kami has drawbacks. Mint is unable to move, thus being unable to return home. Ranpha leaves Mint behind and returns home alone. As Mint thinks and sleeps, time passes by very quickly, resulting in many years passing by. The other Angels have made many attempts to wake up Mint, but have failed. As time moves on, Mint starts to see the world change through centuries. Finally, the other Angels, now in heaven, free Mint from Earth, turning her back into a seed.
29	"Sun-dried Pork Feet" **"Dried Pig's Feet"; Transliteration: "Buta ashi no hi boshi" (Japanese: 豚足の干ぼし)	12 January 2003	TBA
During an evacuation exercise, the Angel Brigade discovers that they are too overweight for the escape pod whose AI mocks them and calls them pigs. Determined, the Angels don heavy pig outfits and trek across the desert to lose weight, to the inspiration of many. The Angels get televised everywhere. As they reach the end of the desert and are greeted by many people, all of whom refer to them as "fat pigs," the Angel Brigade retaliates over the misunderstanding. Now light enough for the escape pod, the escape pod takes off. However, the escape pod activates an emergency nourishment system as part of the exercise in which it force feeds nourishment into each Angel's mouth. The nourishment system overfeeds each Angel, making them excessively obese.
30	"Top Imitation Goose" **"Fried Bean Curd Top Gun"; Transliteration: "Toppu gan modoki" (Japanese: トップがんもどき)	12 January 2003	TBA
After the results come back from the spaceship license renewal test, it is discovered that Milfeulle has failed her exam. In order to help her pass the retake, Commander Volcott calls in a special coach: Lieutenant "The Rattlesnake" Kensit, a hardened soldier and rogue. He and Milfeulle embark on a journey to the depths of society that will reveal the power within. Milfeulle does see any signs of him training her as he simply hacks into the computer to make her a pass. In the end, Milfeulle bakes a cake for him for his Birthday celebration. Meanwhile, Commander Volcott finds out that Milfeulle failed her exam only because her name was missing, making Milfeulle an auto fail.
31	"The Sign is Bouillon" **"Bouillon is the Sign"; Transliteration: "Sain wa buiyon" (Japanese: サインはブイヨン)	19 January 2003	TBA
When Milfeulle is killed by a group of snobbish women, the Angels declare revenge against them. In typical sports anime style, they decide to settle the score by challenging the women to a game of volleyball.
32	"Acting Angel Seafood Soup" **"Performing Angels Ocean Broth"; Transliteration: "Enjiru enjeru ushiojiru" (Japanese: 演じるエンジェル潮汁)	19 January 2003	TBA
Ranpha's niece and her friend are visiting the Angel headquarters and Ranpha is nervous. She may have told a white lie about her position in the Brigade. The other Angels decide to play along, but it is soon apparent that being the Commander was not the only lie Ranpha told.
33	"Specialty Rocky Fish Cake" **"Special Minced Fish"; Transliteration: "Tokkyū ishimochi no tsumire" (Japanese: 特急イシモチのつみれ)	26 January 2003	TBA
The enemy has attacked the Transbaal capital in search of "the stone," an artifact which will turn rocks to gold, cure disease, and grant eternal life. The Angels volunteer to take the stone with them to lure the enemy away from the capital, but soon fall prey to their own weaknesses.
34	"Broken-up Hot Spring Rice Cracker" **"Flower Cracker of Dispersed Hot Water"; Transliteration: "Barabara yunohana senbe" (Japanese: バラバラ湯の花せんべい)	26 January 2003	TBA
On the Angels' day off, Milfeulle wants everyone to spend the day having fun at the onsen. Everyone else, though, has their own idea of fun and they all go their separate ways. Ranpha finds men, Forte finds weapons, Mint finds something worth discovering, and Vanilla rock climbs. Depressed, Milfeulle tries to find ways of amusing herself without her friends, wishing all the while that they would come back. As Milfeulle almost runs out of hope, Vanilla accidentally uncovers a hidden hot springs, spilling water out and washing her and the other Angels back down to Milfeulle. Milfeulle enjoys the rest of the day off while the other Angels have been knocked out by the water.
35	"Competitive Sake Full of Predictions" **"Iris Sake Full of Premonitions"; Transliteration: "Yochi sanmai-shu" (Japanese: 予知三昧酒)	2 February 2003	TBA
After Ranpha buys a new fortune telling board, she runs into Maribu who is critical of her dismissal of science. To prove his point, he challenges her to a duel in which he puts his future predicting robot in competition with Ranpha's board to see which is more accurate. With the loser providing free meals and deserts for everyone, all involved try to make the predictions come true. However, both devices are correct in every question. The other people figure out that the world changes according to predictions from both devices. When Mint asks a question with only one answer and both devices make different answers, the world wipes out and reverts to when the Galaxy Angel Project was being proposed.
36	"Jiggly Pudding" **"Light and Fluffy Pudding"; Transliteration: "Furufuru pudingu" (Japanese: ふるふるプディング)	2 February 2003	TBA
After meeting a strange fortune teller in the city, the Angels are disappearing one by one, just as predicted. Only Mint, as the last one remaining, can help find and bring them back home.
37	"Deep Fried Love Letter" **"Love Letter Fritters"; Transliteration: "Koibumi kakiage" (Japanese: 恋文かき揚げ)	9 February 2003	TBA
Vanilla gets a love letter from a mysterious stranger. When it becomes apparent that she does not know what to do about dates (or knows too much), the Angels band together to help her through the process of love. Ranpha gives her a dating sim to help Vanilla. However, Normad is jealous of Vanilla, feeling that Vanilla has dumped her for this new person. As Vanilla progresses to the point where she gets a night out with the stranger, Normad cannot take it any more and warps back in time to make sure he is Vanilla's love, going far as sending love letters and asking Maribu and Kokomo for assistance. The mysterious stranger may actually be Normad from another time period.
38	"Galactic Rose Tea" **"SAME TITLE"; Transliteration: "Ginga bara kōcha" (Japanese: 銀河薔薇紅茶)	9 February 2003	TBA
Ranpha, returning from a mission, encounters a reckless spacecraft which almost crashes into her. She pursues the pilot of the ship to tell her off, but when the other vessel comes under attack by aliens Ranpha decides to aid the obstinate captain. As Ranpha enters the spacecraft to find the captain, she is told many times to leave. She finds the cockpit and realizes that there is nobody on board except a hologram. The captain tells Ranpha that she is already dead and the spacecraft is destined to die. Ranpha accepts the fate and leaves.
39	"Premium Tuna That Just Won't Slip" **"Grated Fish Meat That Just Won't Fall"; Transliteration: "Nakanaka ochi nai naka ochi" (Japanese: なかなかオチない中オチ)	16 February 2003	TBA
When Ranpha falls for new man, whom she calls "perfect," the other Angels brush it off as another of her whims. Soon, though, the man of Ranpha's dreams comes to train the Brigade and the Angels decide that not only was Ranpha right, but that maybe he is too perfect. The Angels try to challenge him with their expertise and hobby, only to have the man correct problems and improve it. As the Angels see the man leave the bast, the man appears to show deficiencies, but the deficiencies are fake and misleading and the man leaves perfectly.
40	"Assorted Rock Candy Delivery" **"Direct Shipment of Iwaokoshi Cookies"; Transliteration: "Chokusō iwa-okoshi no tsumeawase" (Japanese: 直送岩おこしの詰め合わせ)	16 February 2003	TBA
Forte is charged, with Maribu, to transport a terrible prisoner to another facility. The inmate is so dangerous, having destroyed a planet, that he is encased in stone. While driving the truck carrying the boulder, Forte begins to imagine the kind of dashing rogue that would be so dangerous and begins to let her curiosity get the better of her, much to Maribu's distress. Forte's curiosity causes the boulder to break more, leaving nothing but a black ball. She hears warnings and threats from the inmate. In the end, Forte drops the ball and began to torture it, trying to get him to show his power.
41	"Magic Pot Roast" **"Magic Cooked in Shell"; Transliteration: "Mahō no tsuboyaki" (Japanese: 魔法のつぼ焼き)	23 February 2003	TBA
Milfeulle has been given a magic pot by a street vendor which grants the owner three wishes. After catching wind of this, Forte, Ranpha, and Mint all try to get Milfeulle to use her wishes on them, which soon strains their friendship.
42	"Sub-zero Hot Hot Dog" **"Frigid Hot Hot-Dog"; Transliteration: "Gokkan no hotto hotto doggu" (Japanese: 極寒のホットホットドッグ)	23 February 2003	TBA
Milfeulle is charged with bringing a soldier home from duty. He is long over-due back at base and the planet he was deployed to has long been abandoned and is close to exploding. Milfeulle quickly realizes that the soldier is suffering from PTSD which is causing him to refuse to leave with her.
43	"Retry Rice" **"SAME TITLE"; Transliteration: "Ritorai raisu" (Japanese: リトライライス)	2 March 2003	TBA
The Angels have a lost technology that, when activated, will destroy the universe. The only way to shut it down is to play seven-person, three-letter shiritori with seven laps. Milfeulle is not very good at this game, but Forte knows a turtle which can turn back time an hour. The Angels and Twin Stars continue to mess up until Maribu tells them to stop after calculating that the odds of winning are 23 trillion to one. Maribu instead brings out a bird, which combined with Forte's turtle, allows them to go back to any time. Everyone warps back in time to stop the inventor from building the lost technology in the future. They succeed, but find out that they cannot warp back to the future.
44	"An Offering That You Must Not Eat" **"An Offering You're Not Allowed To Eat"; Transliteration: "Tabete wa ikenai o sonaemono" (Japanese: 食べてはいけないお供え物)	2 March 2003	TBA
Normad beings feeling like he's being taken advantage of. He is offered a chance at a new life with a new body by a mad scientist. Soon he is seeking revenge on the Angel Brigade for their past sins.
45	"Sneaky Seaweed Wrap" **"Kelp-Wrap Flavoring Going Well"; Transliteration: "Shimeshi meko buji me" (Japanese: しめしめこぶじめ)	9 March 2003	TBA
The Angel Brigade is attacked by a seaweed kami who is angry over the abuses it has taken at the hands of the Angels. In order for the deity to return to the sea, the Angels decide to feign loyalty and offer praise to the seaweed.
46	"Fish Jerky Over A Thousand Nights" **"A Thousand and One Nights of Dried Food"; Transliteration: "Hoshimono sen-ya ichiya" (Japanese: 干物千夜一夜)	9 March 2003	TBA
Vanilla returns from vacation with an uncountable number of boxes containing fish jerky. While everyone else is pleased, Kokomo refuses to eat any. Vanilla is determined that he try some and tracks him to a wild west town to make sure he does. The owner of a restaurant initially tries to shut Vanilla away, but Vanilla floods the entire town with fish jerky, causing mass hysteria throughout the town. The owner changes his stance and forces Kokomo to eat fish jerky, prompting him to escape. The chase lasts for many years until Vanilla gets frozen and everyone becomes old. Everyone else, while old, still enjoys fish jerky, but Kokomo continues to run when he accidentally unfreezes Vanilla.
47	"Anyway Angel Morning Set" **"Anyway... Angel Breakfast Set"; Transliteration: "Tonikaku enjeru mōningu setto" (Japanese: とにかくエンジェル モーニングセット)	16 March 2003	TBA
With everyone busy or gone, Commander Volcott has no one to turn to when enemies attack their base. To fix this problem, the military orders that the Angels hire a new recruit. Only, the Angels are the final decision makers. They first reject all the recruits, but each find their own recruit. No one is in agreement about whom to hire and forms teams against one another. As each Angel abuses their recruit with their hobbies, the recruits are exhausted and propose to form their own Brigade. The original Angels felt betrayed and ran campaigns to find replacements. When another mission is called, a large crowd of new Angels responds, jamming the base up. The original Angels agree they went too far.
48	"Starchild Sausage" **"Star Child Sausage"; Transliteration: "Hoshi no ko sōsēji" (Japanese: 星の子ソーセージ)	16 March 2003	TBA
Kokomo and Maribu miss their mother and seek out Normad who has technology that will let them see on a screen the vague memories they have of her. The only image they get is of a woman with a star shaped birthmark on her neck. When Normad reveals that the image is from the future, that the brothers were sent into the past, and their mother could be among them on base, they go in search of the star. As they check the necks of each Angel, they find the star on Vanilla and begin to treat Vanilla as if it was their mother. As Kokomo and Maribu become too protective are start to fight, Commander Mary and another person with the star tells them to stop. Meanwhile, Vanilla takes the star off, revealing it to be fake.
49	"Fresh Packed Fish" **"Fresh Red Snapper Clearance Sale"; Transliteration: "Shinsen tai-zukushi" (Japanese: 新鮮 鯛づくし)	23 March 2003	TBA
After Commander Volcott faints and is taken to hospital, he charges the Angels to be the fighters of justice before passing away. Thereafter, the Angels play out a cliché 52 episode super sentai TV program in fifteen minutes.
50	"Prohibited String-pulling String-pulling Fermented Beans" **"Stringy Natto Not Allowed to be Stringy"; Transliteration: "Ito hiki kinshi no ito hiki nattō" (Japanese: 糸ひき禁止の糸ひき納豆)	23 March 2003	TBA
At the request of Mint, Ranpha and Milfeulle are sent to a planet in which customs and protocol are held above all else. The king of the planet has a dangly hair much like a pullstring and Milfeulle can not help but point it out. Despite death glares from the court royals, they are invited to dinner where their will to suppress the urge to pull the king's hair is pushed to its limit. Ranpha and Milfeulle then sneaks into king's bedroom and pull the string, causing the king to act differently and explode. Ranpha and Milfeulle turn into kings and Mint, the former victim, escapes. Kokomo and Maribu arrive next and begin to feel the urge to pull the king's hair as they greet, repeating the cycle.
51	"Final dish REBECCA (part 1)" **"SAME TITLE"; Transliteration: "finaldish REBECCA (zenpen)" (Japanese: finaldish REBECCA（前編）)	30 March 2003	TBA
Note: Episodes 51 and 52 are a single episode which is played straight. The Angels are sent to find an escaped convict who was sentenced to a 2000 year sentence for murdering 1/3 the population of planet Transbaal 500 years ago. The convict's name is Rebecca and, despite the crime she was convicted for, there seems to be no picture of her. What little information they can gather about the escape leads Forte, Ranpha and Mint to an abandoned satellite above Transbaal. Arriving, they find a recently used ship, but no life signs. After more investigating, Kokomo and Maribu inform the Angels that Rebecca was documented as being incarcerated in a cell that was already occupied. The occupant then died, but no one had ever been assigned since, leading Mint to the conclusion that Rebecca never existed and that she could have been a cover up for a military accident.
52	"Final dish REBECCA (part 2)" **"SAME TITLE"; Transliteration: "finaldish REBECCA(kōhen)" (Japanese: finaldish REBECCA（後編）)	30 March 2003	TBA
After discovering that Rebecca may not be real, Forte, Ranpha and Mint are ambushed on the satellite. Meanwhile, Milfeulle is attacked by the prison guard who stood watch over Rebecca for years. Once Vanilla disarms him, he confesses that Rebecca is real and that she led a very sad and lonely existence. After fighting for some time, Forte realizes that Rebecca is actually the incarnation of the hatred the people of Transbaal felt after their world had been set aflame. Vanilla and Milfeulle learn that the archetype for Rebecca was a young female soldier who knew the people needed a scapegoat and offered herself to be one. They locate the scapegoat's prison (a grave) and take the casket to the Satellite. The scapegoat is awakened and cries out to Rebecca. Rebecca is shocked to see her true form and even more so when she is embraced by her. Overwhelmed with grief, Rebecca relents and vanishes. The scapegoat is returned to her prison for the remainder of her sentence. As the Angels leave they pray that the world is a better place when the scapegoat's sentence is over and she is free once more.
53	"Very Fried Chicken" **"Total Fried Chicken"; Transliteration: "Metcha! Furaido chikin" (Japanese: めっちゃ！フライドチキン)	TBA	TBA
The Angel Brigade and Twin Star team have been entered into a birdman rally by their commanders to see who will get most of the budget this year. The twins have a glider, while the Angels have a special craft. Milfeulle and Vanilla have to manually carry it to the rally due to shipping cancellation, leading to Commander Volcott in a chicken suit running the first rounds. The Loch Ness Monster shows up and disrupts the competition, but the Twin Star was able to set the lead. As Commander Mary reveals that she caused the cancellation, the other Angels quickly bring the craft to the rally. The craft fails, but Milfeulle helicopters to the monster, making her the winner.
54	"An Oyster Fried Very Shameful" **"Shamefully Over-fried Fried Oysters"; Transliteration: "Haji kakifurai agari sugi" (Japanese: 恥カキフライあがり過ぎ)	TBA	TBA
As punishment for eating Milfeulle's sweet rice buns, Forte has been sent to a holiday planet and must pose, in a frilly dress, for a picture with a man whom she must flirt with. To keep an eye on her, Normad is sent along. Forte and Normad soon forge a temporary alliance and plot to get out of the situation as fast as possible.

=== Galaxy Angel S ===
Series S was a special that aired between AA and X.
** Most English episodes have an alternate title that a voice actor says at the starting title "menu" of each episode.

No.	Title	Original release date	
1	"Ghost in the Jam" **"Fuyūrei Purée Jelly"; Transliteration: "Fuyūrei pyūre jure" (Japanese: フユーレイピューレジュレ)	21 December 2003	TBA
During an infiltration of the Angels' base, Milfeulle grabs a grenade and runs off with it, sacrificing herself to save her friends. Later on, she wakes up, believing it all to have been a dream. Things seem off when Commander Volcott and the others can not see or hear her. Realizing she is now a ghost, Milfeulle must come to terms with memories of her friends, both good and bad.
2	"Shuffle Udon" **"Moving Udon"; Transliteration: "Ido udon" (Japanese: いどうどん)	21 December 2003	TBA
Commanders Mary and Volcott have been ordered to switch commands. Neither is very happy with the situation, but they make do. That is, until the Twin-star boys insult Commander Volcott's mustache. Enraged, he reverts to his old army self, the "White Supernova Wolf". The Angels try desperately to control their former leader while Mary sneaks off for some tea.

=== Galaxy Angel X ===
The English dub cuts off after the 8th episode of the final season.
** Most English episodes have an alternate title that a voice actor says at the starting title "menu" of each episode.

No.	Title	Original release date	
1	"Ordinary Extraordinary Chocolates" **"Extraordinarily Common Chocolate Bon-bons"; Transliteration: "Hibon Heibon Choko Bonbon" (Japanese: 非凡平凡チョコボンボン)	7 July 2004	TBA
The Angel Brigade find themselves in a mundane existence, having ordinary lives. Have they found peace or despair?
2	"Steamed, Thinking of You" **"Rice Water for You"; Transliteration: "Anata wo omoyu..." (Japanese: 貴女をおもゆ。。。)	7 July 2004	TBA
A terminally ill girl, Chitose Karasuma, has a dying wish to become one of the Angel Brigade. Her efforts to become friends with each member do not go quite as planned.
3	"Lucky Monkey, Sweating Crying Hole Punched" **"Grilled, Sweaty, Belly-Scratching, Holy, Lucky Monkey"; Transliteration: "Rakkii monkii asekaki besokaki anaakii yaki" (Japanese: ラッキーモンキー汗かきベソかき穴あきー焼き)	14 July 2004	TBA
The Angel Brigade learns the extraordinary benefits of chikuwa.
4	"Trial Price for a Slice of Friendship" **"Slices of Friendship at a Trial Price"; Transliteration: "Yūjō no kirimi o tameshi kakaku" (Japanese: 友情の切り身お試し価格)	14 July 2004	TBA
Chitose wants to become friends with Milfeulle, but she cannot help but test their bond at every opportunity.
5	"Commander Flavored Invasion" **"Invasion Spice Lieutenant Colonel Samadi"; Transliteration: "Shinryaku supaisu chūsa sanmai" (Japanese: 侵略スパイス中佐三昧)	21 July 2004	TBA
The commander has been taken seriously ill and requires an operation. When the hospital staff turn out to be aliens, can Mint suppress her anxiety during her diet from jelly beans?
6	"Marriage Meeting Ice Cream" **"Arranged Marriage Ice Cream"; Transliteration: "O mi aisu" (Japanese: お見アイス)	21 July 2004	TBA
Forte has been invited to meet a potential suitor. She becomes a spider.
7	"Soup That Has Simmered Extra Long" **"Specially Well-boiled Soup"; Transliteration: "Wazawaza kotokoto nikonda sūpu" (Japanese: わざわざコトコト煮込んだスープ)	28 July 2004	TBA
While searching for lost technology, the Angel Brigade finds a small dog which Forte dislikes. She throws a stick at it while quoting a proverb about dogs and sticks. The stick was the lost technology and its power turns proverbs into reality. Now, to return everything to normal, the Angels must outwit wisdom.
8	"Sadness And Hatred Tofu" **"Sorrow, Hatred, Frozen Tofu"; Transliteration: "Kanashimi nikushimi shimi tōfu" (Japanese: 哀しみ憎しみ凍み豆腐)	28 July 2004	TBA
Forte has been murdered. The scene, being difficult to reach, casts suspicion on the rest of the Angels. In typical soap opera style, the investigation takes numerous and unforeseen twists and turns to finally discover who the true culprit is.
9	"Go Ahead, Rice Cooker"; Transliteration: "Janjan suihan ja ̄" (Japanese: じゃんじゃん炊飯じゃー)	4 August 2004	TBA
While slacking off in the lost technology storage locker, Chitose discovers a rice cooker which will suck in items (and people) around it, turning them into rice. Upon eating the rice, the user gains the traits of the items consumed. Chitose plots revenge upon the Angels with her new cooker.
10	"Love Rice"; Transliteration: "Rabu-mai" (Japanese: ラブ米)	4 August 2004	TBA
In order to bring an anti-government army leader to justice, the Angels must infiltrate a high school and risk life, limb, and love for their mission.
11	"Memory-full Sukiyaki"; Transliteration: "Omoide gyūgyū nabe" (Japanese: 思い出ぎゅうぎゅう鍋)	11 August 2004	TBA
When the Angels' sukiyaki party goes awry due to using cursed ingredients as a means to skimp on money, only Milfeulle seems to be able to save the day.
12	"History is a Princess Melon"; Transliteration: "Sono toki rekishi wa, purinsesu meron" (Japanese: その時歴史は、プリンセスメロン)	11 August 2004	TBA
The cast tell a tale of epic proportions in this historical drama narrated by Commander Mary.
13	"Upstart Agaricus"; Transliteration: "Nari agarikusudake" (Japanese: 成りアガリクスダケ)	18 August 2004	TBA
Ranpha decides that the Angels should start a rock band. However, her idea of rock is somewhat different from the norm. Meanwhile, having been kicked out of the group, Forte goes on a soul finding quest.
14	"Caring Soba"; Transliteration: "Omamori soba" (Japanese: お守りそば)	18 August 2004	TBA
Commander Volcott has a typical day of waking up the Angels, feeding them, mopping up after them, and falling in love while getting groceries.
15	"Boiled Tiger of Trauma"; Transliteration: "Tora no umani" (Japanese: トラのうま煮)	25 August 2004	TBA
While transporting Commander Volcott to a trial for testimony, the Angels are ambushed. Suddenly, everyone starts having flashbacks of traumatic experiences. The team must overcome their pasts to outwit the guerrilla warriors out for their heads.
16	"Today's Corporation in Steamed Turnip"; Transliteration: "Kyō-fū (kabu) ra mushi" (Japanese: 今日風（株）ラ蒸し)	25 August 2004	TBA
After Commander Volcott is suddenly fired, the Angels unwittingly agree to help him start an independent business. Soon, their new candy flute is a huge hit, but they will have to outmaneuver their competitors to stay ahead.
17	"Hitman's Russian Tea"; Transliteration: "Ko ro ro roshiantī" (Japanese: コ・ロ･ロ・ロシアンティー)	1 September 2004	TBA
Milfeulle is targeted by a professional hit-man. However, his skills are put to the test when her legendary luck rears its ugly head.
18	"Avenger Ale"; Transliteration: "Avuenjā ēru" (Japanese: アヴェンジャーエール)	1 September 2004	TBA
Normad has had enough of Forte's treatment of him and vows revenge. Chitose, eager to help, uses lost technology to give him arms and legs. These do him little good as he is not strong enough to defeat Forte. Soon, Normad is training hard and with Chitose as his manager, a boxing anime breaks out.
19	"Combustible Fried Broken Heart"; Transliteration: "Nenshō-kei shōshin-age" (Japanese: 燃焼系傷心揚げ)	8 September 2004	TBA
A fire has broken out in the Angel's quarters. To Mint's dismay all of her kigurumi have been destroyed. With their friend close to the edge of despair, the others try their best to cheer her up. However, they find it increasingly difficult to conceal the identity of the culprit who started the blaze.
20	"Stewed Love of Laughing Rush"; Transliteration: "O Emi igusa no koi koku" (Japanese: お笑イグサのコイこく)	8 September 2004	TBA
While walking at night, Ranpha finds a tatami mat in an alley. It turns out to have the power to fly and protect its master which Ranpha finds useful. But when a rich playboy wants to sweep Ranpha off her feet, tatami-san finds himself in the way.
21	"Hi! Crepe Jack"; Transliteration: "Hāi! Chiri menjyakku" (Japanese: ハーイ！ ちりめんじゃっく)	15 September 2004	TBA
On their way to a long awaited vacation, the Angels are alerted to the fact there is a hijacker on board and they must find him before the shuttle lands. Along with Commander Mary, they must use their elite sleuthing skills to apprehend the criminal before it is too late.
22	"Rainy Blue"; Transliteration: "Reinī burū" (Japanese: レイニーブルー)	15 September 2004	TBA
The Angel Brigade is summoned to a planet that has had constant rain for years. The inhabitants suspect that a lost technology that has somehow fused itself to a war orphan is to blame. Milfeulle tries to become friends with the little girl in question, unaware of the government's plan to stop the rain.
23	"Angelic Steamed Fish Paste"; Transliteration: "Enjeruna kama boko" (Japanese: エンジェルなかまボコ)	22 September 2004	TBA
Chitose is finally transferred into the Angel Brigade, but quickly realizes that she is not really needed. After a pep talk from Normad, she decides that she should not expect to be loved for nothing and uses a lost technology to turn herself into a doll in hopes of being useful to the rest of the Angels.
24	"Boiled Flounder in Curry"; Transliteration: "Karei nitsuke karē" (Japanese: カレイ煮付けカレー)	22 September 2004	TBA
Vanilla seems to be infatuated with a man she bumped into a week ago, enough that she is stalking him. Normad is frightened of this new rivalry and becomes terrified when she starts presenting the man with gifts. The rest of the Angels are simply happy that Vanilla has finally found someone to love.
25	"Wish Bound Together with Eggs"; Transliteration: "Nozomi ka na e tama-gotoji" (Japanese: のぞみかなえたまごとじ)	29 September 2004	TBA
While sorting lost technologies, Chitose finds a book which makes things written in it come true. At last, her dreams of getting revenge on the Angel Brigade might be realized.
26	"All Okay Location Lunchbox"; Transliteration: "Ōruokkēroke bentō" (Japanese: オールオッケーロケ弁当)	29 September 2004	TBA
After three years of being on the air, Galaxy Angel is coming to an end and the actors are sad to see it go. Having played the Angels for so long they are still referring to each other by their character names. But before taping finishes, the Transbaal capital is attacked. With the real Galaxy Angels nowhere to be found it is up to this group of actors to save the day.

=== Music ===
Opening theme

- Galaxy★Bang! Bang! by Angel-tai (Ryōko Shintani, Yukari Tamura, Miyuki Sawashiro, Mayumi Yamaguchi)
