= Super Imaginative Chogokin =

Japanese line of die-cast metallic figurines

Super Imaginative Chogokin (aka S.I.C.) is one of Bandai's popular line-up of die-cast metallic figurines (chogokin) based on the Kamen Rider franchise and other characters created by Shotaro Ishinomori and his production company. The figures are usually modified and differ from its counterpart as seen in the series. It is intended for those riders to closely resemble the ones portrayed in the manga and to have a much darker theme. S.I.C. figures are mostly sculpted by Takayuki Takeya and Kenji Ando.

== History ==
The S.I.C. product line is made up of 1:10-scale action figures typically around 7 inches (18 cm) tall. The line debuted in December 1998 with Kikaider. Popularity grew for S.I.C. due to its reimagination of the original comic book characters: S.I.C. reinterprets the late Shotaro Ishinomori's original artwork. The first ten figures were statuettes mounted on stands but for Volume 11: Side Machine and Kikaider the figure was given articulate joints because this set included a bike.

== Spin-offs ==
Due to its popularity, many spin-off lines were created. The first was S.I.C. Takumi-Damashii, small figurines based on their S.I.C. counterparts. A similar S.I.C. line based on the tokusatsu show GARO was created in 2006, called Equip and Prop. Another line is called Rangers Strike Solid, It was released in March 2007, It Is similar to the S.I.C. Takumi-Damashii but the figures' poses were based on a card line by Cardass and the line was dedicated to the long-running Super Sentai. The Movie Realization line debut in 2004, featuring characters such as Devilman, Kamen Rider, Evangelion, Spider-Man, and Batman. In 2009, S.I.C. Kiwami-Tamashii, smaller than the standard version, was released, the first figure being Kamen Rider Hibiki.

== S.I.C. ==
Volume	Name	Date released
1	Kikaider	December 1998
2	Bijinder	December 1998
3	Kikaider 00	February 1999
4	Hakaider	May 1999
5	Kikaider 01	July 1999
6	Inazuman	September 1999
7	Kamen Rider 1	February 2000
8	Kamen Rider 2	June 2000
9	Kamen Rider V3	August 2000
10	Robot Detective K	November 2000
11	Side Machine & Kikaider	March 2001
12	Hakaider & Bike	May 2001
13	Kamen Rider Kuuga	December 2001
14	Kamen Rider 1 & Cyclone	April 2002
15	Kamen Rider 2 & Shocker Rider	August 2002
16	Kamen Rider Black RX & Kamen Rider Black	October 2002
17	Shadow Moon & Kamen Rider Black (Green Version)	December 2002
18	Kamen Rider V3 & Riderman	February 2003
19	Kamen Rider Agito	June 2003
20	Another Agito & Kamen Rider Agito Burning/Shining Form	September 2003
21	Kamen Rider Amazon & Jungler	December 2003
22	Kamen Rider Kuuga Mighty Form	March 2004
23	Kamen Rider Ryuki	May 2004
24	Kamen Rider Knight & Kamen Rider Ouja	July 2004
25	Kamen Rider Ryuga & Alternative Zero	September 2004
26	Kamen Rider ZO & Doras	December 2004
27	Kamen Rider Zolda & Kamen Rider Tiger	March 2005
28	Kamen Rider Faiz	April 2005
29	Kamen Rider Faiz Blaster Form & Auto Vajin	August 2005
30	Kamen Rider Kaixa & Kamen Rider Delta	October 2005
31	Akumaizer 3	December 2005
32	Kamen Rider Hibiki	March 2006
33	Kamen Rider Hibiki Kurenai & Kamen Rider Todoroki	June 2006
34	Kamen Rider Ibuki & Kamen Rider Zanki	August 2006
35	Kamen Rider Blade	December 2006
36	Kamen Rider Garren & Kamen Rider Chalice	February 2007
37	Kamen Rider Blade Jack Form & Kamen Rider Leangle	March 2007
38	Kikaider 01 & Side Machine	May 2007
39	Kamen Rider G3 & Kamen Rider G4	July 2007
40	Kamen Rider Agito & Machine Tornador	January 2008
41	Kamen Rider X & Apollo Geist	May 2008
42	Kamen Rider Den-O Sword Form & Momotaros Imagin	July 2008
43	Kamen Rider Den-O Gun Form & Ryutaros Imagin	September 2008
44	Kamen Rider Zeronos & Deneb	December 2008
45	Kamen Rider Den-O Liner Form & Kamen Rider Zeronos Zero Form	January 2009
46	Kamen Rider 1 & Cyclone (Kamen Rider The First version)	February 2009
47	Kamen Rider Den-O Climax Form & Urataros Imagin	March 2009
48	Kamen Rider Gaoh & Kintaros Imagin	June 2009
49	Henshin Ninja Arashi & Majinsai	July 2009
50	Kamen Rider Kiva	August 2009
51	Kamen Rider Decade	November 2009
52	Kamen Rider Kabuto	January 2010
53	Kamen Rider Dark Kabuto & Kamen Rider Gatack	February 2010
54	Kamen Rider Ixa & Kamen Rider Dark Kiva	May 2010
55	Kamen Rider Stronger & Tackle	September 2010
56	Kamen Rider Kuuga ~Decade Edition~	December 2010
57	Kamen Rider W CycloneJoker/CycloneJokerXtreme	March 2011
58	Kamen Rider W LunaTrigger & HeatMetal	June 2011
59	Kamen Rider W FangJoker & Kamen Rider Skull	August 2011
60	Skyrider	November 2011
61	Kamen Rider Super-1	December 2011
62	Kamen Rider ZX	March 2012
63	Kamen Rider Gills & Another Agito	May 2012
64	Kamen Rider OOO Tatoba Combo	September 2012
65	Kamen Rider OOO Tajador Combo	December 2012
66	Kamen Rider OOO Putotyra Combo	May 2013
67	Kamen Rider KickHopper & Kamen Rider PunchHopper	September 2013
68	Kamen Rider New 1 (Renewal)	January 2014
69	Kamen Rider Old 2 (Renewal)	April 2014
70	Kamen Rider Wizard Flame Style	August 2014
71	Kamen Rider Wizard Flame Dragon Style & All Dragon Style	February 2015
72	Kamen Rider Gaim Gaim Orange Arms	June 2016
73	Kamen Rider Drive Drive Type Speed	December 2016

=== Limited Versions ===
- March 1999 Artist Special Version Kikaider
- March 1999 Artist Special Version Bijinder
- March 1999 Artist Special Version Kikaider 00
- November 1999 Red Hakaider
- November 1999 Blue Hakaider
- November 1999 Silver Hakaider
- November 2000 Robot Detective K (Power Up Version)
- August 2003 Another Shadow Moon
- January 2005 Doras Red Version
- September 2006 Kamen Rider Sabaki, Kamen Rider Eiki & Kamen Rider Danki
- September 2007 Kamen Rider Kuuga Rising Forms
- November 2008 Kamen Rider Den-O Rod Form & Ax Form

==== Toei Hero Net ====
- April 2002 S.I.C. Hero Saga Kamen Rider Kuuga Edition
- November 2002 Hakaider with Red Hakaider, Blue Hakaider, and Silver Hakaider
- November 2003 S.I.C. Official Diorama Story Hero Saga Golgos
- July 2004 Kamen Rider Ryuki Blank Form & Kamen Rider Ouja Blank Form
- March 2005 Kamen Rider J
- July 2005 Kamen Rider Faiz Axel Form
- May 2006 Kamen Rider Pre-Amazon
- October 2007 Kamen Rider Garren Jack Form
- December 2008 Kamen Rider G3 Mild
- November 2009 Kamen Rider Den-O Super Climax Form
- September 2010 Kamen Rider New Den-O Strike Form
- March 2012 Kamen Rider W CycloneJokerGoldXtreme
- January 2015 Kamen Rider Leangle Jack form
- January 2016 Kamen Rider Garren King Form

==== Mook Hobby Japan ====
- August 2002 S.I.C. official Diorama Story Kikaider 00 Kikaider Black Version
- January 2004 Another RX
- June 2005 Kamen Rider Ryuga Survive (Dragblacker)
- January 2008 Warring State Period Kamen Rider Armed Hibiki
- May 2010 Kamen Rider Den-O Wing Form
- October 2011 Kamen Rider W CycloneCyclone & JokerJoker

==== Event ====
- March 2007 Imagination Works Limited Kamen Rider Hibiki Maziora
- March 2007 Imagination Works Limited Kamen Rider Ryuga with Dragblacker
- July 2007 Imagination Works Ani-Com 2007 Hong Kong Limited Kamen Rider Todoroki Maziora
- March 2008 Tamashii Nation 2008 Kamen Rider Wild Chalice
- December 2008 70th Shotaro Ishinomori Anniversary Limited Kamen Rider X (Original Version)
- March 2009 Tamashii Nation 2009 Momotaros Imagin (Pre-Contract Version)
- October 2010 Tamashii Nation 2010 Kamen Rider Wild Chalice (later re-released in April 2011)

==== Bandai Tamashii Web ====
- June 2009 Kamen Rider Nega Den-O
- September 2009 Negataros Imagin
- December 2009 Kamen Rider Kiva Emperor Form
- March 2010 S.I.C. Kanto 11 Oni -Elite Assembly- (Kamen Rider Goki, Kamen Rider Shoki, Kamen Rider Toki, Kamen Rider Banki)
- August 2010 Kamen Rider Den-O Kohana & Naomi
- October 2010 Bandai S.I.C. Special Set 6 Altered Humans (from Kamen Rider 1 to Kamen Rider X)
- April 2011 Kamen Rider Diend
- September 2011 Kamen Rider W Effect Parts Set
- January 2012 Kamen Rider Yuuki
- July 2012 Kamen Rider Joker
- October 2012 Kamen Rider G Den-O
- November 2012 Gills Raider & Dark Hopper
- March 2013 Kamen Rider OOO Gatakiriba Combo
- March 2013 Kamen Rider OOO Effect Set
- September 2013 Kamen Rider OOO Shauta Combo
- October 2013 Kamen Rider OOO Tajador Combo (Lost Blaze Version)
- November 2013 Kamen Rider Cyclone
- December 2013 Greeed Uva
- February 2014 Kamen Rider TheBee
- May 2014 Strengthed Skyrider
- June 2014 Greed Mezool
- July 2014 Kamen Rider OOO Sagozo Combo
- September 2014 Kamen Rider Shin
- September 2014 Cyborg Soldier Level 3
- November 2014 Kamen Rider OOO Burakawani Combo
- January 2015 Kamen Rider Wizard Water Style
- April 2015 Kamen Rider OOO Super Tatoba Combo
- April 2015 Kamen Rider OOO Tamashii Combo
- September 2015 Kamen Rider Birth
- October 2015 Kikaider
- November 2015 Kamen Rider Birth Prototype
- January 2016 Kamen Rider Wizard Infinity Style
- February 2016 Hakaider
- March 2016 Kamen Rider OOO Latoratar Combo

==== Other ====
- Silver Kikaider (Limited 50 pieces)
- Silver Bijinder (Limited 50 pieces)
- Silver Kikaider 00 (Limited 50 pieces)
- Indigo Kamen Rider V3
- Kamen Rider Hibiki (Clear Color Version)
- Kamen Rider Ryuki (Clear Color Version)
- Kamen Rider 2 (Dark Helmet Version)

== Classics ==
A series of previously released S.I.C. figures re-issued in new anniversary versions. These editions feature mini-books collected from the "Hero Saga" series serialized in Hobby Japan magazine.

Volume	Name	Re-Release Date
18	Kamen Rider V3 & Riderman	June 2007
13	Kamen Rider Kuuga	June 2007
23	Kamen Rider Ryuki	August 2007
20	Another Agito & Kamen Rider Agito Burning/Shining Form	September 2007
21	Kamen Rider Amazon & Jungler	November 2007
12	Hakaider & Bike	December 2007
28	Kamen Rider Faiz	December 2007
35	Kamen Rider Blade	March 2008
7	Kamen Rider 1	August 2008
16	Kamen Rider Black RX & Kamen Rider Black	September 2008
9	Kamen Rider V3	September 2008
17	Shadow Moon & Kamen Rider Black (Green Version)	October 2008
22	Kamen Rider Kuuga Mighty Form	December 2008

== Takumi Damashii ==
S.I.C. Takumi Damashii (TD) are similar to its parent model S.I.C., they both take works created by Ishinomori Shotaro but TDs are different because they are a lot smaller and are statuettes which are sculpted in a pose already. Just like S.I.C., after the bike set TDs allowed the figures to have different poses. Moreover, S.I.C. Takumi Damashii featured as a set, which contains various character, such as Kamen Rider, Kikaider, and many other featured characters. The set also offers color variation for the character figure, aside from secret character that can be obtained in every set. As of 2009 the series has span up to 10 volumes with 3 special volumes & 1 archive.

Volume 1
(Sept. 2003)

1. Kikaider
2. Skyzel
3. Henshin Ninja Arashi
4. Gattaider

Volume 2
(Dec. 2003)

1. Kamen Rider 1
2. Hakaider
3. Granzel
4. Zabitan

Volume 3
(Apr. 2004)

1. Kamen Rider V3 & Riderman
2. Robocon
3. Kikaider 01
4. Iberu & Gobbler

Volume 4
(Nov. 2004)

1. Kikaider & Side Machine
2. Bijinder & Side Machine
3. Inazuman
4. Kamen Rider Stronger and Tackle

Volume 5
(Mar. 2005)

1. Kamen Rider Kuuga
2. Kikaider 00
3. Hakaider
4. Bike

Volume 6
(Jul. 2005)

1. Kamen Rider 1
2. Waruder
3. Shadow Moon
4. Cyclone

Volume 7
(Mar. 2006)

1. Kamen Rider Black
2. Kamen Rider Ryuki
3. Battle Hopper
4. Robocon
5. Roboconcar

Special Edition
(Sept. 2006)

1. Red Hakaider & Bike
2. Blue Hakaider & Bike
3. Silver Hakaider & Bike
4. Perfect Kikaider & Side Machine
5. Bijinder
6. Kamen Rider Kuuga Ultimate Form

Volume 8
(Mar. 2007)

1. Kamen Rider Black RX
2. Akarenger (First Super Sentai S.I.C.)
3. Kamen Rider Agito (Ground Form, Flame Form, Storm Form)
4. Machine Tornador

Volume 9
(Nov. 2007)

1. Kamen Rider 1 (The First)
2. Cyclone (The First)
3. Kamen Rider 2 (The First)
4. Cyclone 2
5. Kamen Rider Hibiki
6. Robot Detective K

Special 2nd Edition
(Mar. 2008)

1. Kamen Rider Todoroki
2. Kamen Rider Zanki
3. Kamen Rider Hibiki Kurenai
4. Kamen Rider 1 (The Next)
5. Kamen Rider 2 (The Next)
6. Kamen Rider Ibuki
7. Choujin Bibyun
8. Choujin Zusheen & Choujin Bashaan

Volume 10
(Nov. 2008)

1. Riderman
2. Kamen Rider Nega Den-O
3. Momotaros Imagin
4. Kamen Rider Den-O Sword Form
5. Momoranger
6. Kamen Rider Den-O Gun Form

ARCHIVES
(Mar. 2009)

1. Inazuman
2. Kikaider
3. Hakaider
4. Kamen Rider 1
5. Kamen Rider Kuuga Mighty Form

Special 3rd Edition
(Jun. 2009)

1. Kamen Rider New Den-O Strike Form
2. Kamen Rider V3 (The Next)
3. Shocker Rider (The Next)
4. Kamen Rider Den-O Ax Form & Kamen Rider Den-O Rod Form
5. Kamen Rider Zeronos
6. Kamen Rider Sabaki
7. Kamen Rider Eiki
8. Kamen Rider Danki

Limited Edition

1. Shocker Rider Set
2. Kamen Rider 1(Clear ver.) (Exclusive for Tamashii Nations 2008)

== Kiwamii Tamashii ==
These are smaller and more affordable versions of existing S.I.C. figures.

Volume	Name	Date released
1	Kamen Rider Hibiki	January 2009
2	Kamen Rider Ryuki	July 2009
3	Kamen Rider Knight	September 2009
4	Kamen Rider Zanki	September 2009
5	Kamen Rider Todoroki	September 2009
6	Kamen Rider Faiz	November 2009
7	Auto Vajin	December 2009
8	Kamen Rider Faiz (Axel Form)	December 2009
9	Kamen Rider Faiz (Blaster Form)	December 2009
10	Kamen Rider Blade	February 2010
11	Kamen Rider Wild Chalice	May 2010
12	Kamen Rider Den-O (Sword Form)	June 2010
13	Momotaros Imagin	July 2010
14	Kamen Rider Blade (King Form)	September 2010
15	Kamen Rider Garren	November 2010
16	Kamen Rider Blade (Jack Form)	February 2011
17	Kamen Rider Agito (Ground Form)	April 2011
18	Machine Tornador	July 2011
19	Kamen Rider Agito (Trinity Form)	August 2011
20	Kamen Rider Kaixa	November 2011
21	Wolf Orphnoch	December 2011
22	Side Basshar	February 2012
23	Horse Orphnoch	April 2012
24	Kamen Rider Kuuga (Mighty Form)	July 2012
25	Kamen Rider Decade	November 2012
26	Kamen Rider Kuuga (Rising Ultimate)	December 2012
27	TryChaser 2000	February 2013

- The Faiz Auto Vajin (motorbike that transforms into a robot – 'Battle Mode') is a larger figure than others in the Kiwami Tamashii line, stand at approximately 18 cm instead of the regular 12 cm.

=== Special/Limited Editions ===
- Kamen Rider Hibiki (Clear Purple Version)

Special prize included for Hyper Hobby Plus Vol. 6/2009

- Kamen Rider Hibiki Kurenai

Tamashii Nation 2009 Autumn event exclusive Hibiki Kurenai was a repaint of the original, as well as having an exclusive extra – a red falcon disc animal. It cannot transform, however.

- Momotaros Imagin (Pre-Contract Version)

Tamashii Nation 2010 exclusive

- Kamen Rider Nega Den-O

Jusco Shop exclusive

=== Tamashii Web Exclusive ===
- January 2011 DenLiner DX Set
- December 2011 Kamen Rider Agito Flame Form & Storm Form Effect Set
- September 2012 Horse Orphnoch (Gallop Mode)
- May 2013 Kamen Rider Kuuga 3 Form set (Dragon, Pegasus, Titan)
- August 2013 Gouram
- November 2013 Kamen Rider Kuuga Rising Mighty & Beat Chaser 2000 Set
