= Nanamori =

Nanamori may refer to:

== People ==
- Nanamori (singer) (ななもり。), Japanese singer
- Mie Nanamori (七森 美江, born 1972), Japanese actress
- Nana Mori (森 七菜, born 2001), Japanese actress

== Characters ==
- Sayoko Nanamori, a RahXephon character
