= Agito =

Agito may refer to:

== In arts and entertainment ==
=== Characters ===
- Kamen Rider Agito (character), the titular character in the Kamen Rider Agito tokusatsu TV series
- Another Agito, a character in the 2001 Kamen Rider Series Kamen Rider Agito
- Agito, a character in the movie Kamen Rider J
- Wanijima Agito, a character in the Air Gear anime and manga series
- Agito, the main character in the Origin: Spirits of the Past anime series
- Agito (Nanoha), a character in the Magical Girl Lyrical Nanoha Strikers anime series
- Agito, a character in the Jujutsu Kaisen anime and manga series

=== Other uses in arts and entertainment ===
- Kamen Rider Agito, a 2001-2002 TV series in the Kamen Rider franchise
- Final Fantasy Agito XIII, the original title of the 2011 PSP video game Final Fantasy Type-0
- Final Fantasy Agito, the mobile device prequel to Final Fantasy Type-0

== Other uses ==
- Agito (symbol) (meaning "I move" in Latin), a symbol used by the International Paralympic Committee
