= Akumaizer 3 =

- Genre: Tokusatsu
- Created by: Shotaro Ishinomori
- Written by: Shukei Nagasaka (head writer)
- Directed by: Atsuo Okunaka
- Starring: Jirō Chiba
- Voices of: Makio Inoue; Kōji Yada; Jōji Yanami
- Narrated by: Nobuo Tanaka
- Theme music composer: Michiaki Watanabe
- Opening theme: "Victory! Akumaizer 3" by Ichirou Mizuki and Koorogi '73
- Ending theme: "Forward, Zeiderbeck!" by Ichirou Mizuki and Koorogi '73
- Composer: Michiaki Watanabe
- Country of origin: Japan
- Original language: Japanese
- No. of episodes: 38

Production
- Production companies: NET; Toei Company

Original release
- Network: ANN (NET)
- Release: October 7, 1975 – June 29, 1976

Related
- Choujin Bibyun

Akumaizer 3 (アクマイザー3, Akumaizā Surī) is a Japanese science fiction tokusatsu television series, created by Shotaro Ishinomori and produced by Toei Company. The series premiered on Tuesday October 7, 1975, at 7:30, and ran for 38 episodes in that timeslot on NET, now known as TV Asahi. The series remains obscure outside Japan, but was popular and renowned in its home country. The series was followed by a sequel called Chojin Bibyun which used rejected designs from the Kamen Rider series as its hero designs.

== Production ==
The program frequently alludes to the famous Alexandre Dumas, père novel The Three Musketeers.

Due to the inhuman nature of the main characters, the primary protagonists and antagonists were portrayed exclusively by stuntmen, with only their voices being portrayed by professional actors. Because of this, an unusual number of well-known voice actors star in the series, as the voices of the main characters. Makio Inoue portrays Xavitan., Kōji Yada plays Evil, and Jōji Yanami provides Gabra's gravelly intonation.

== Plot summary ==
The program follows the adventures of three mutant superhero-refugees from the "Akuma Clan" ("Devil Clan", in English), a vast empire that exists below the surface of the Earth, and their efforts to stop the Akumas from attacking the surface world. The three warriors are Xavitan, a half-demon swordsman, Evil, a somewhat vain and foppish sharpshooter, and Gabra, a slow- and dim-witted strongman. Together, they make up the superheroic team of the show's title. At the end of the series, the heroes' bodies are destroyed, but their souls survive to be reincarnated in the direct sequel to the show, Choujin Bibyun

== Characters ==
=== Akumaizer 3 ===
- Xavitan (ザビタン, Zabitan): A fencer who actually is the son of an Akuma male and a human female. As a result, Xavitan chooses to leave the Akuma Clan and defend the humans from them. Aside from his Xarado blade, he is armed with Xavitan Nova shoulder cannons. Though posing as Ippei, he later assumes the form of Takeshi Nagumo and works under him.
- Evil (イビル, Ibiru): Member of the Discipline group sent after Xavitan. Though Xavitan captures him, he spares Evil's life as he never killed anyone. As a result, Evil joins Xavitan. Other than his Elado blade, Evil also uses the Jo Gun and can execute the Evil Finish attack.
- Gabra (ガブラ, Gabura): A water demon who is another member of the Discipline group sent after Xavitan. He end up joining Xavitan in similar circumstances to Evil. Armed with the Garado sword and Denball and chain, Gabra can remove his muscle restraints to fight at full power. He can also transform into the ostrich-like Gabracho bird.

=== Totou Times ===
- Jun
- Ippei Shima
- Mitsuhiko

=== Allies ===
- Darunia
- Demon Peace Party (Heiwatô Yonin Jyu)
  - Basugaru
  - NaameNaameda
  - Nobera
  - Nobera Jr

=== Akuma Clan ===
The Akuma Clan are a race of magical cyborgs who live deep within the earth, and plot to invade the surface world.

- Mezalord (メザロード): The Akuma Clan's leader

== Episodes ==
1. Why? Xavitan's Rebellion (なぜだ?! ザビタンの反逆!)
2. Why Did She Die?! Xavitan's Mother (なぜ死んだ?! ザビタンの母)
3. Why?! Gabra's Disappearance (なぜだ?! ガブラが消えた)
4. Why?! Evil's Treachery (なぜだ?! イビルの裏切り)
5. Why?! Xavitan's Refusal To Fight (なぜだ?! 闘わぬザビタン)
6. Why?! Gabra's Big Comeback (なぜだ?! ガブラの大逆転)
7. Why?! The Hundred Degrees Below Zero Revenge (なぜだ?! 逆襲の零下百度)
8. Why?! Xavitan Is Captured By Children (なぜだ?! 子供につかまったザビタン)
9. Why?! Gabra The Enemy (なぜだ?! ガブラが敵に)
10. Why?! Darunia's Crisis (なぜだ?! ダルニアの危機)
11. Why?! Evil and the Child (なぜだ?! 子連れイビル)
12. Why?! Blinded Xavitan (なぜだ?! ザビタン失明)
13. Why?! Xavitan Impersonated (なぜだ?! ザビタンが化けた?)
14. Why?! Ippei's Double (なぜだ?! 一平がふたり?)
15. Why?! Ippei The Tengu (なぜだ?! 一平がテングになった)
16. Why?! Secret of the Red Umbrella (なぜだ?! 赤い傘の秘密)
17. Why?! The Other Xavitan (なぜだ?! もう一人のザビタン)
18. Why?! Target: Evil (なぜだ?! 狙われたイビル)
19. Why?! Xavitan's Five Secrets (なぜだ?! ザビタン五つの謎)
20. Why?! Xavitan's Secret Power (なぜだ?! ザビタンの秘密能力)
21. Why?! Tokyo Encased In Ice! (なぜだ!? 東京がカチンカチン)
22. Why?! The Fake Genius Project (なぜだ?! インチキ天才計画)
23. Why?! Magic Powers Have No Effect (なぜだ?! 魔法力がきかない)
24. Why?! The Overprotective Nobera Family (なぜだ?! 親馬鹿ノッペラー)
25. Why?! Gabra's Transformation Into A Bird (なぜだ?! ガブラが鳥になった)
26. Why?! The Dancing Gabra Cho (なぜだ?! 踊るガブラッチョ)
27. Why?! Xavitan Has Been Blown Away (なぜだ?! ザビタンが吹っ飛んだ)
28. Why?! The Deadly Tengu Manipulation (なぜだ?! 恐怖のテングあやつり)
29. Why?! Xavitan's Judgement (なぜだ?! 裁かれるザビタン)
30. Why?! The Mystery of the Sleeping Beauty (なぜだ?! 眠る少女の謎)
31. Why?! The Challenge From Hell (なぜだ?! 地獄からの挑戦状)
32. Why?! The Akuma Fugitive (なぜだ?! アクマの逃亡者)
33. Why?! Xavitan In Hot Water (なぜだ?! ザビタン釜ゆで)
34. Why?! 2 + 3 Is The Magic Number (なぜだ?! 2+3はへのへのもへじ)
35. Why?! The Human Robots (なぜだ?! 人間がロボットに)
36. Why?! Gabra Cho Is Swallowed Up (なぜだ?! のみこまれたガブラッチョ)
37. Why?! The Akuma Clan's All Out Attack (なぜだ?! アクマ族総攻撃!)
38. Why?! The Time Capsule (なぜだ?! 明日へのカプセル)

== Songs ==
Opening theme

- Shouri da! Akumaizâ Surî (勝利だ!アクマイザー3, "Victory, Akumaizer 3")
  - Lyrics: Shotaro Ishimori
  - Composition & Arrangement: Chumei Watanabe
  - Artist: Ichirô Mizuki and Koorogi '73

Ending Theme

- Susume Zaidabekku (すすめ!ザイダベック, "Forward Zeiderbeck")
  - Lyrics: Saburo Hatte
  - Composition & Arrangement: Chumei Watanabe
  - Artist: Ichirô Mizuki and Koorogi '73

== Merchandise ==
The series was released on Region 2 DVD in October 2005. In December of the same year, a boxed set of action figures of slightly redesigned versions of the three characters was released as part of Bandai's Super Imaginative Chogokin series. Many toys and action figures have been released in connection with the series.

== Cultural influence ==
While Akumaizer 3 has not achieved the fame or international recognition of its tokusatsu contemporaries like Kamen Rider (also created by Ishinomori) or Ultraman, it is not without cultural resonance. In the 2007 anime, Lucky Star, in which the characters sing popular songs karaoke-style, over the end credits, the character Konata sings the series' theme song in the second episode. Additionally, the main antagonists of the film Kamen Rider × Kamen Rider Wizard & Fourze: Movie War Ultimatum, the Akumaizer, are directly inspired by the heroes of the original series.
