= List of Kamen Rider Agito characters =

The four heroic Riders of Kamen Rider Agito transformed. From left to right: Makoto Hikawa (Kamen Rider G3), Ryo Ashihara (Kamen Rider Gills), Shoichi Tsugami (Kamen Rider Agito), and Kaoru Kino (Another Agito).

Kamen Rider Agito (仮面ライダーアギト, Kamen Raidā Agito) is a Japanese tokusatsu series that serves as the 11th entry in the Kamen Rider franchise and the second entry in the Heisei era. It also served as an indirect sequel to Kamen Rider Kuuga.

== Main characters ==
=== Shoichi Tsugami ===
Shoichi Tsugami (津上 翔一, Tsugami Shōichi) is the series protagonist. He suffers from amnesia and uses the name from a letter found in his possession. Living with the Misugi family, he performs household chores. Despite his amnesia, he typically displays an optimistic personality and has a fondness for gardening, cooking, and dad jokes. He later remembers that his true identity is Tetsuya Sawaki (沢木 哲也, Sawaki Tetsuya), a former culinary school student, with his current alias actually being the name of his late sister's boyfriend. After the Overlord's defeat, Shoichi opens a restaurant named after his Rider identity. Years later, during the events of Kamen Rider Zi-O, Restaurant Agito has become a franchise. Shoichi personally manages a location in Paris, France. As of the events of the film Agito: Psychic War, Shoichi's seed of Agito has gone dormant due to disuse, preventing him from transforming. However, as a result of his Agito factor reacting to Kaoru Kino's transformation into Shining Gill Agito, he regains some of his Agito powers.

Utilizing the Altering (オルタリング, Orutaringu) belt, Shoichi can transform into Kamen Rider Agito, a powerful warrior whose abilities evolve through the Wiseman Monolith (ワイズマンモノリス, Waizuman Monorisu) embedded in his chest. His personal vehicle is the Machine Tornador (マシントルネイダー, Mashin Toruneidā) motorcycle, converted from his Honda VTR1000F, which can be reconfigured into an alternate hoverboard-like Slider Mode (スライダーモード, Suraidā Mōdo). Later in the series, the Altering gains the Dragon's Nail (ドラゴンズネイル, Doragonzu Neiru) belt buckle that allows Shoichi to summon the double-bladed Shining Caliber (シャイニングカリバー, Shainingu Karibā) sword, which can switch between its one-piece Single Mode (シングルモード, Shinguru Mōdo) and its two-piece Twin Mode (ツインモード, Tsuin Mōdo). As Kamen Rider Agito, much like his predecessor Kamen Rider Kuuga, Shoichi can assume different colored forms, which are as follows:

- Ground Form (グランドフォーム, Gurando Fōmu): Shoichi's gold-colored default form that channels the element of earth into his chest to grant superhuman agility. When his power reaches its peak, the Cross Horn (クロスホーン, Kurosu Hōn) crest on his head opens, allowing him to perform the Rider Kick (ライダーキック, Raidā Kikku) and Rider Punch (ライダーパンチ, Raidā Panchi) finishers.
- Storm Form (ストームフォーム, Sutōmu Fōmu): A blue-colored auxiliary form that channels the element of wind into Shoichi's left arm to grant superhuman speed. In this form, he wields the Storm Halberd (ストームハルバード, Sutōmu Harubādo), which allows him to perform the Halberd Spin (ハルバードスピン, Harubādo Supin) finisher when the Drag Storm (ドラグストーム, Doragu Sutōmu) blades open.
- Flame Form (フレイムフォーム, Fureimu Fōmu): A red-colored auxiliary form that channels the element of fire into Shoichi's right arm to grant superhuman strength. In this form, he wields the Flame Saber (フレイムセイバー, Fureimu Seibā), which allows him to perform the Saber Slash (セイバースラッシュ, Seibā Surasshu) finisher when the Saber Horn (セイバーホーン, Seibā Hōn) crossguard opens. He can also produce a second Flame Saber for dual wielding and to perform the stronger Double Saber Slash (ダブルセイバースラッシュ, Daburu Seibā Surasshu) finisher.
- Trinity Form (トリニティフォーム, Toriniti Fōmu): A tricolored upgrade form first achieved when Shoichi's memories are temporarily restored that combines the powers of his three main forms, allowing him to dual wield the Storm Halberd and Flame Saber. His finishers in this form are the Rider Shoot (ライダーシュート, Raidā Shūto) via the Altering and the Fire Storm Attack (ファイヤーストームアタック, Faiyā Sutōmu Atakku) via the Storm Halberd and Flame Saber.
- Burning Form (バーニングフォーム, Bāningu Fōmu): Shoichi's crimson-colored super form that grows stronger as his fury increases, which initially makes it difficult to control. In this form, he primarily wields the Shining Caliber in Single Mode. His finishers in this form are the Burning Rider Punch (バーニングライダーパンチ, Bāningu Raidā Panchi) via the Altering and the Burning Bomber (バーニングボンバー, Bāningu Bonbā) via the Shining Caliber.
  - Shining Form (シャイニングフォーム, Shainingu Fōmu): A silver-colored evolution of Burning Form and Shoichi's final form first achieved when he exposes himself to direct sunlight while in Burning Form, which causes his armor to molt. Initially Shoichi could only access this form by first assuming Burning Form and then basking in sunlight, but by the time of the final battle he displays the ability to transform directly into it. In this form, he primarily wields the Shining Caliber in Twin Mode. His finishers in this form are the Shining Rider Kick (シャイニングライダーキック, Shainingu Raidā Kikku) via the Altering and the Shining Clash (シャイニングクラッシュ, Shainingu Kurasshu) via the Shining Caliber.

Shoichi also wears the Kamen Rider G3-X suit on one occasion, successfully proving its effectiveness against the Unknown. During the events of Kamen Rider Zi-O, Shoichi briefly dons a mass-produced Kamen Rider G3 suit when his Agito powers are temporarily lost.

Shoichi Tsugami is portrayed by Toshiki Kashu (賀集 利樹, Kashū Toshiki).

=== Makoto Hikawa ===
Makoto Hikawa (氷川 誠, Hikawa Makoto) is a clumsy yet capable police officer hailed as the hero of the Akatsuki incident, single-handedly saving everyone on board when the ship was caught in a mysterious storm. As an officer in the Tokyo Metropolitan Police Department's SAUL division, Makoto is the primary operator of the G3 System exoskeleton, also designated Kamen Rider G3 (仮面ライダーG3(ジースリー), Kamen Raidā Jī Surī; Generation 3), which was originally developed to fight the Gurongi, also known as the Unidentified Life Forms, and was visually modeled after Unidentified Life Form #4, Kamen Rider Kuuga. Makoto is the first to suggest that the Unknown are targeting humans with supernatural powers, though this theory is often dismissed by his superiors. Makoto is also the first person to learn of Mana's special abilities. Having witnessed Shoichi as Kamen Rider Agito fight and save people several times, Makoto staunchly supports Agito as an ally of humanity even before learning of his true identity. After the Overlord's defeat, Makoto returns to being a normal police officer. As of the events of the film Agito: Psychic War, Makoto is imprisoned for the murder of Kasumi Murano, a crime he did not commit.

As Kamen Rider G3, Makoto wields a variety of armaments, such as the GM-01 Scorpion (GM-01 スコーピオン, Jī Emu Zero Wan Sukōpion) handgun, the GG-02 Salamander (GG-02 サラマンダー, Jī Jī Zero Tsū Saramandā) grenade launcher, the GS-03 Destroyer (GS-03 デストロイヤー, Jī Esu Zero Surī Desutoroiyā) sword, and the GA-04 Antoures (GA-04 アンタレス, Jī Ē Zero Fō Antaresu) grappling hook. His personal vehicle is the Guard Chaser (ガードチェイサー, Gādo Cheisā) motorcycle, which is based on Kamen Rider Kuuga's Try Chaser 2000 and Beat Chaser 2000. He can also use the Guardacceler (ガードアクセラー, Gādoakuserā), which normally serves as the Guard Chaser's grip/key, as a baton.

As the G3 System was specifically designed to fight the Gurongi, Makoto often struggles against the Unknown. Because of this, Sumiko Ozawa eventually develops the upgraded Kamen Rider G3-X (仮面ライダーG3-X(ジースリーエックス), Kamen Raidā Jī Surī Ekkusu; Generation 3 eXtension) suit. The G3-X System is overall more powerful than its predecessor and is equipped with a support AI that assists the operator. When first deployed, G3-X is considered a "perfect system," but Makoto's brute force approach clashes against the AI's precise calculations, causing G3-X to operate erratically and injure Makoto until Ozawa installs a dampener chip. As G3-X, Makoto wields the GX-05 Kerberos (GX-05 ケルベロス, Jī Ekkusu Zero Faibu Keruberosu) Gatling gun and the electromagnetic GK-06 Unicorn (GK-06 ユニコーン, Jī Kē Zero Shikussu Unikōn) dagger in addition to his previous equipment. The GX-05 Kerberos can be used in either its standard Vulcan Mode (バルカンモード, Barukan Modō) or combined with the GM-01 Scorpion and a GX Bullet (GX弾, Jī Ekkusu Dan) to form the GX Launcher (GXランチャー, Jī Ekkusu Ranchā) rocket launcher. Both the G3 and G3-X suits feature a Gauge Lamp G Buckle (ゲージランプGバックル, Gēji Rampu Jī Bakkuru) belt, which displays a battery gauge on the buckle and has an emergency release function.

During the events of Agito: Psychic War, Kamen Rider G7 (仮面ライダーG7(ジーセブン), Kamen Raidā Jī Sebun; Generation 7) is developed. Makoto can don the G7 System by using the G Buckle Mark 7 (Gバックル mark7, Jī Bakkuru Māku Seven) belt, which summons the armor pieces to attach to a bodysuit that is worn under his clothing. As G7, Makoto wields the GZ-10 Orochi (GZ-10 オロチ, Jī Zetto Ten Orochi) katana and can launch the G7-Drones (G7-ドロン, G7-Doron) from the suit's body parts. Additionally, G7 features a refined version of G4's predictive AI in addition to a virtual reality system that allows Sumiko to further support Makoto via a special headset.

Makoto Hikawa is portrayed by Jun Kaname (要 潤, Kaname Jun).

=== Ryo Ashihara ===
Ryo Ashihara (葦原 涼, Ashihara Ryō) is a former star swimmer and university student who, after a near-fatal motorcycle accident, develops the ability to become Kamen Rider Gills (仮面ライダーギルス, Kamen Raidā Girusu), a flawed and unstable form of Agito with a wild and aggressive fighting style. His father was a passenger on the Akatsuki and committed suicide after the incident. Ryo discovers the passenger manifest in his father's personal effects and begins tracking down the survivors seeking the truth behind his father's death. After dropping out of university and being abandoned by his swimming coach and girlfriend out of fear of his transformation into Gills, Ryo becomes a brooding wanderer. He eventually develops feelings for Aki Sakaki and, when she is killed by Pantheris Magistra, Ryo believes Agito to be her killer. The misunderstanding causes Agito and Gills to fight several times before they discover each other's identities. Because of Gills' flawed nature, Ryo initially experiences increasing cellular breakdown every time he transforms, but after he is killed by Katsuhiko Sagara and later resurrected by Mana's regenerative power, transforming no longer harms him. After the Overlord's defeat, he encounters a young puppy and continues to wander the world. Prior to the events of Agito: Psychic War, Ryo is killed by psychics, with Kaoru Kino in possession of Gills' damaged corpse.

As Kamen Rider Gills, Ryo can grow either Gills Claw (ギルスクロウ, Girusu Kurō) blades from his limbs or Gills Filler (ギルスフィラー, Girusu Firā) tentacles from his wrists, open his faceplate to reveal the Demon's Fang Crusher (デモンズファングクラッシャー, Demonzu Fangu Kurasshā) jaws, and perform the Gills Heel Claw (ギルスヒールクロウ, Girusu Hīru Kurō) and Gills Hell Stab (ギルスヘルスタッブ, Girusu Heru Sutabbu) finishers. His personal vehicle is the Gills Raider (ギルスレイダー, Girusu Reidā) motorcycle.

Later in the series, Ryo receives Koji Majima's seed of Agito, which allows him to transform into his final form; Kamen Rider Exceed Gills (仮面ライダーエクシードギルス, Kamen Raidā Ekushīdo Girusu). In this form, he gains the ability to extend clawed Gills Stinger (ギルススティンガー, Girusu Sutingā) tentacles from his back and can perform the (Double) Exceed Heel Claw ((ダブル) エクシードヒールクロウ, (Daburu) Ekushīdo Hīru Kurō) finisher.

Ryo Ashihara is portrayed by Yūsuke Tomoi (友井 雄亮, Tomoi Yūsuke).

=== Mana Kazaya ===
Mana Kazaya (風谷 真魚, Kazaya Mana) is the daughter of Nobuyuki Kazaya and Yoshihiko Misugi's step-niece. She possesses a seed of Agito, which initially grants her clairvoyance. Once her powers are fully awakened by "Tetsuya Sawaki," she gains a regenerative power that she uses to resurrect Ryo, though the strain of doing so causes her to lose this power. Years after the Overlord's defeat and during the events of Kamen Rider Zi-O, Mana is working as a server at the original Restaurant Agito location. As of the events of the film Agito: Psychic War, Mana is married, but is separated from her husband because their relationship is not going well.

Mana Kazaya is portrayed by Rina Akiyama (秋山 莉奈, Akiyama Rina). As a child, Mana is portrayed by Satomi Tanimura (谷村 聡美, Tanimura Satomi).

== Recurring characters ==
=== Yoshihiko Misugi ===
Yoshihiko Misugi (美杉 義彦, Misugi Yoshihiko) is a psychology professor and lives with his son, Mana, and Shoichi. He is also Sumiko Ozawa's former professor.

Yoshihiko Misugi is portrayed by Takeshi Masu (升 毅, Masu Takeshi).

=== Taichi Misugi ===
Taichi Misugi (美杉 太一, Misugi Taichi) is Yoshihiko's son.

Taichi Misugi is portrayed by Tokimasa Tanabe (田辺 季正, Tanabe Tokimasa).

=== Metropolitan Police Department ===
A division of the Tokyo Metropolitan Police Department, the MPD Squad Against Unidentified Lifeforms (警視庁未確認生命体対策班, Keishichō Mikakunin Seimei-tai Taisaku-han), abbreviated as SAUL (サウル, Sauru), is tasked with researching, developing, and deploying countermeasures for unknown or supernatural threats. SAUL's G3 Unit maintains and monitors the G3 and G3-X powered exoskeletons and related equipment from the G-Trailer (Gトレーラー, Ji Torērā) mobile command base. As of the events of the film Agito: Psychic War, SAUL has been re-designated MPD Special Armed Squad Against Unidentified Lifeforms (警視庁未確認生命体対策特殊武装班, Keishichō Mikakunin Seimei-tai Taisaku Tokushu Busō-han), otherwise known as the G Unit (Gユニット, Jī Yunitto).

==== Sumiko Ozawa ====
Sumiko Ozawa (小沢 澄子, Ozawa Sumiko) is the genius behind the G3 System. Her position within SAUL's G3 unit is the system's monitor engineer, overseeing the operator and G3 suit during combat from the G-Trailer. She later develops the G3-X system and designs the G4 system, but shelves the latter when it proves too dangerous for humans to use. Because of her blunt and unfeminine personality, Sumiko frequently comes into conflict with her colleagues in the MPD, especially Tōru Hōjō, and has great faith in Makoto's abilities as G3's operator. After the Overlord's defeat, she leaves the police force and becomes a professor at the University of West London. As of the events of the film Agito: Psychic War, Sumiko has returned to the police as the leader of the G Unit.

Sumiko Ozawa is portrayed by Toko Fujita (藤田 瞳子, Fujita Tōko).

==== Takahiro Omuro ====
Takahiro Omuro (尾室 隆弘, Omuro Takahiro) is Sumiko's assistant at the G-Trailer. He frequently serves as comic relief, being more laid-back and carefree than his colleagues. After the Overlord's defeat, he becomes the squad leader of the G5 Unit. By the time of Kamen Rider Zi-O, Omuro has become commander of the G3 Team (G3チーム, Jī Surī Chīmu), which utilizes mass-produced G3 suits. As of the events of the film Agito: Psychic War, Takahiro has been promoted to Assistant Commissioner.

During the events of the special Kamen Rider Agito Special: A New Transformation, Takahiro becomes the test operator of Kamen Rider G3 Mild (仮面ライダーG3マイルド, Kamen Raidā Jī Surī Mairudo), a prototype for a mass-production version of Kamen Rider G3. Late in the series, when the G3 Unit is restructured to hunt Agitos instead of the Unknown, Takahiro is briefly assigned as Kamen Rider G3's operator.

Takahiro Omuro is portrayed by Akiyoshi Shibata (柴田 明良, Shibata Akiyoshi).

==== Tōru Hōjō ====
Tōru Hōjō (北條 透, Hōjō Tōru) is an assistant inspector and Makoto's rival, having been the original candidate for G3. Tōru is frequently shown to be a capable and dedicated police officer. However, his resentment from believing Makoto was selected to be G3 solely due to being the hero of the Akatsuki incident drives him to carry out several schemes to either replace Makoto as G3 or get the G3 Unit shut down by proving its ineffectiveness. His schemes succeed at times, once being briefly assigned as G3's operator before abandoning the suit and fleeing in cowardice during a battle with an Unknown. Tōru also creates and executes a plan to capture Agito, which instead leads to the squad encountering Ryo as Gills. Later, Tōru commissions the development of the V-1 System (V-1システム, Bui Wan Shisutemu; Victory One) powered exoskeleton to rival the G3-X System as a replacement for the obsolete G3.

The V-1 System suit is damaged beyond repair when G3-X's support AI goes haywire, interpreting Tōru mockingly pointing his gun at Makoto as a threat. Tōru eventually shifts his focus to discovering why the Unknown are killing people, in the process discovering Shoichi's identity and the truth behind Nobuyuki Kazaya's death. Late in the series, after a month with no Unknown attacks, Tōru develops a fear of the Agito, believing they will eventually outnumber humans and take over the world. Under his recommendation, the G3 Unit is restructured to hunt the Agito, assigning Tōru as G3-X's operator. However, Sumiko and Makoto soon forcefully take the equipment from him to confront the Overlord. As of the events of the film Agito: Psychic War, Tōru has quit the police and become a private investigator to find the real culprit behind the murder of Kasumi Murano. As a secondary infected person compatible with the Agito factor, he gains self-duplication capabilities.

Tōru Hōjō is portrayed by Jun Yamasaki (山崎 潤, Yamasaki Jun).

==== Kōji Kōno ====
Kōji Kōno (河野 浩司, Kōno Kōji) is Tōru Hōjō's boss. He investigates the Nobuyuki Kazaya murder case and frequently invites his colleagues out for ramen.

Kōji Kōno is portrayed by Kazumasa Taguchi (田口 主将, Taguchi Kazumasa).

==== Sakiko Mikumo ====
Sakiko Mikumo (三雲 咲子, Mikumo Sakiko) is a researcher in charge of the OOPArts Research Department established within SAUL who solves the puzzle artifact containing the Overlord's DNA. She is killed by Anguis Femineus.

Sakiko Mikumo is portrayed by Ryoko Takizawa (滝沢 涼子, Takizawa Ryōko).

=== Lord Monsters ===
The Lord Monsters (ロード怪人, Rōdo Kaijin), labeled as "Unknowns" (アンノウン, An'nōn) by the police, are a group of powerful disciples serving under the Overlord. They attack humans with the potential to evolve into an Agito, seeing them as a threat to the Overlord, particularly the survivors of the Akatsuki incident and their family members. They perform a distinctive ritual hand gesture before attacking.

- Pantheras Luteus (パンテラス・ルテウス, Panterasu Ruteusu): A leopard-themed Jaguar Lord (ジャガーロード, Jagā Rōdo). He is destroyed by Agito. Voiced by Jin Yamanoi (山野井 仁, Yamanoi Jin).
- Pantheras Albus (パンテラス・アルビュス, Panterasu Arubyusu): A snow leopard-themed Jaguar Lord. He is destroyed by Agito. Voiced by Jin Yamanoi.
- Pantheras Tristis (パンテラス・トリスティス, Panterasu Torisutisu): A black panther-themed Jaguar Lord. He is destroyed by Agito. Voiced by Jin Yamanoi.
- Testudo Oceanus (テストゥード・オケアヌス, Tesutūdo Okeanusu): A sea turtle-themed Tortoise Lord (トータスロード, Tōtasu Rōdo). He is destroyed by Agito.
- Testudo Terrestris (テストゥード・テレストリス, Tesutūdo Teresutorisu): A tortoise-themed Tortoise Lord. He is destroyed by G3.
- Anguis Masculus (アングィス・マスクルス, Angwisu Masukurusu): A cobra-themed Snake Lord (スネークロード, Sunēku Rōdo). He is destroyed by Gills. Voiced by Hiroyuki Shibamoto (柴本 浩行, Shibamoto Hiroyuki).
- Anguis Femineus (アングィス・フェミネウス, Angwisu Femineusu): A venomous snake-themed Snake Lord. The Overlord telekinetically forces Femineus to kill herself for breaking the taboo of taking the life of a normal human. During the events of the Hyper Battle Video special Kamen Rider Agito: Three Great Riders, she is destroyed by Agito. Voiced by Mako Hyōdō (兵藤 まこ, Hyōdō Mako).
- Corvus Croccio (コルウス・クロッキオ, Korūsu Kurokkio): A Crow Lord (クロウロード, Kurō Rōdo). He is destroyed by Agito. Voiced by Katsumi Shiono (塩野 勝美, Shiono Katsumi).
- Mollipes Octipes (モリペス・オクティペス, Moripesu Okutisu): An Octopus Lord (オクトパスロード, Okutopasu Rōdo). He is destroyed by Agito. Voiced by Yoshimasa Chida (千田 義正, Chida Yoshimasa).
- Equus Noctis (エクウス・ノクティス, Ekūsu Nokutisu): A Zebra Lord (ゼブラロード, Zebura Rōdo). He is destroyed by Agito.
- Equus Dies (エクウス・ディエス, Ekūsu Diesu): A Zebra Lord. He is destroyed by Gills.
- Leiurus Acutia (レイウルス・アクティア, Reiurusu Akutia): A Scorpion Lord (スコーピオンロード, Sukōpion Rōdo). He is destroyed by Agito. Voiced by Shigenori Sōya (宗矢 樹頼, Sōya Shigenori).
- Skelos Falx (スケロス・ファルクス, Sukerosu Farukusu): A Jackal Lord (ジャッカルロード, Jakkaru Rōdo). He is destroyed by Agito. During the events of the Hyper Battle Video special Kamen Rider Agito: Three Great Riders, he is destroyed by G3-X. Voiced by Yoshimasa Chida.
- Hydrozoa Ignio (ヒドロゾア・イグニオ, Hidorozoa Igunio): A jellyfish-themed Hydrozoa Lord (ハイドロゾアロード, Haidorozoa Rōdo). He is destroyed by Agito. During the events of the Hyper Battle Video special Kamen Rider Agito: Three Great Riders, he is destroyed by Gills. Voiced by Masaharu Satō (佐藤 正治, Satō Masaharu).
- Pantheras Cyaneus (パンテラス・キュアネウス, Panterasu Kyuaneusu): A Jaguar Lord. He is destroyed by Agito. Voiced by Shigenori Sōya.
- Pantheras Rubeo (パンテラス・ルベオー, Panterasu Rubeō): A Jaguar Lord. He is destroyed by Gills. Voiced by Shigenori Sōya.
- Pantheras Magistra (パンテラス・マギストラ, Panterasu Magisutora): The Queen Jaguar Lord (クイーンジャガーロード, Kuīn Jagā Rōdo). She is destroyed by Agito. Voiced by Hiromi Nishikawa (西川 宏美, Nishikawa Hiromi).
- Apis Vespa (アピス・ウェスパ, Apisu Wesupa): A wasp-themed Bee Lord (ビーロード, Bī Rōdo). He is destroyed by Agito. Voiced by Katsumi Shiono.
- Apis Mellitus (アピス・メリトゥス, Apisu Meritusu): A honey bee-themed Bee Lord. She is destroyed by G3-X. Voiced by Yumi Takada (高田 由美, Takada Yumi).
- Potamotrigon Cucullus (ポタモトリゴン・ククルス, Potamotorigon Kukurusu): A skate-themed Stingray Lord (スティングレイロード, Sutingurei Rōdo). He is destroyed by G3-X. Voiced by Katsumi Shiono.
- Potamotrigon Cassis (ポタモトリゴン・カッシス, Potamotorigon Kasshisu): A manta ray-themed Stingray Lord.
- Corvus Luscus (コルウス・ルスクス, Korūsu Rusukusu): A Crow Lord. He is destroyed by Agito. Voiced by Yoshimasa Chida.
- Corvus Intonsus (コルウス・イントンスス, Korūsu Intonsusu): The Queen Crow Lord (クイーンクロウロード, Kuīn Kurō Rōdo). She is destroyed by Agito. Voiced by Chizu Yonemoto (米本 千珠, Yonemoto Chizu).
- Corvus Calvus (コルウス・カルウス, Korūsu Karūsu): A Crow Lord. He is destroyed by Agito. Voiced by Yoshimasa Chida.
- Echinus Famelicare (エキヌス・ファメリカーレ, Ekinusu Famerikāre): A Sea Urchin Lord (シーアーチンロード, Shī Āchin Rōdo). He is destroyed by Gills. Voiced by Jin Yamanoi.
- Piscis Arapaima (ピスキス・アラパイマ, Pisukisu Arapaima): An arapaima-themed Fish Lord (フィッシュロード, Fisshu Rōdo). He is destroyed by G3-X. Voiced by Katsumi Shiono.
- Crustata Palleo (クルスタータ・パレオ, Kurusutāta Pareo): A Crab Lord (クラブロード, Kurabu Rōdo). He is destroyed by Agito. Voiced by Ryōichi Tanaka (田中 亮一, Tanaka Ryōichi).
- Cetos Orcinus (ケトス・オルキヌス, Ketosu Orukinusu): A Orca Lord (オルカロード, Oruka Rōdo). He is destroyed by Agito. Voiced by Toshihide Tsuchiya (土屋 利秀, Tsuchiya Toshihide).
- El of the Water (水のエル, Mizu no Eru): A whale-themed El Lord (エルロード, Eru Rōdo). He is defeated by Agito, returning to the Overlord's body to recuperate and undergo an evolution. He is ultimately wounded by Agito, Exceed Gills, and Another Agito before being unable to return to the Overlord's body in time, and is reduced to a puddle of water. Voiced by Kiyoyuki Yanada (梁田 清之, Yanada Kiyoyuki).
- Propheta Cruentus (プロフェタ・クルエントゥス, Purofeta Kuruentusu): A Mantis Lord (マンティスロード, Mantisu Rōdo). He is destroyed by Agito. Voiced by Toshihide Tsuchiya.
- Corvus Canosus (コルウス・カノッスス, Korūsu Kanossusu): A Crow Lord. She is destroyed by Gills. Voiced by Toko Fujita, who also portrays Sumiko Ozawa.
- Piscis Serratus (ピスキス・セラトゥス, Pisukisu Seratusu): A piranha-themed Fish Lord. He is destroyed by Another Agito. Voiced by Hiroyuki Shibamoto.
- Stellio Dextera (ステリオ・デクストラ, Suterio Dekusutora): An iguana-themed Lizard Lord (リザードロード, Rizādo Rōdo). He is destroyed by Agito. Voiced by Masaharu Satō.
- Stellio Sinistra (ステリオ・シニストラ, Suterio Shinisutora): An iguana-themed Lizard Lord. He is destroyed by G3-X. Voiced by Masaharu Satō.
- Skelos Glaucus (スケロス・グラウクス, Sukerosu Guraukusu): A Jackal Lord. He is destroyed by G3-X. Voiced by Hiroyuki Shibamoto.
- Volucris Ulucus (ウォルクリス・ウルクス, Worukurisu Urukusu): An Owl Lord (オウルロード, Ōru Rōdo). He is destroyed by Agito. Voiced by Keikō Sakai (酒井 敬幸, Sakai Keikō).
- Volucris Falco (ウォルクリス・ファルコ, Worukurisu Faruko): A Falcon Lord (ファルコンロード, Farukon Rōdo). He is destroyed by G3-X. Voiced by Toshihide Tsuchiya.
- Ericius Liquor (エリキウス・リクォール, Erikiusu Rikwōru): A porcupine-themed Hedgehog Lord (ヘッジホッグロード, Hejjihoggu Rōdo). He is destroyed by Agito, Exceed Gills, and Another Agito. Voiced by Hitoshi Horimoto (堀本 等, Horimoto Hitoshi).
- El of the Wind (風のエル, Kaze no Eru): A hawk-themed El Lord. He is destroyed by G3-X and Exceed Gills. Voiced by Kujira (くじら).
- El of the Ground (地のエル, Chi no Eru): A lion-themed El Lord. He is mortally wounded by Agito, renergized and strengthened by the Overlord. He is ultimately destroyed by Agito. Voiced by Kenta Miyake (三宅 健太, Miyake Kenta).

==== Other Lord Monsters ====
- Scarabaeus Fortis (スカラベウス・フォルティス, Sukarabeusu Forutisu): A Japanese rhinoceros beetle-themed Beetle Lord (ビートルロード, Bītoru Rōdo) who appears exclusively in the special Kamen Rider Agito Special: A New Transformation. He is destroyed by Agito. Voiced by Shigenori Sōya.
- Formica Pedes (フォルミカ・ペデス, Forumika Pedesu): Ant Lords (アントロード, Anto Rōdo) who appear exclusively in the film Kamen Rider Agito the Movie: Project G4. numbers of them are destroyed by Agito, G3-X, Gills, and G4. Voiced by Kunihiko Yasui (安井 邦彦, Yasui Kunihiko), Yuuki Anai (穴井 勇輝, Anai Yūki), Yoshio Nomura (野村 義男, Nomura Yoshio), Koichi Terasawa (寺沢 功一, Terasawa Kōichi), JOE, Katsumi Shiono.
- Formica Eques (フォルミカ・エクエス, Forumika Ekuesu): An Ant Lord who appears exclusively in the film Kamen Rider Agito the Movie: Project G4. He is destroyed by Exceed Gills. Voiced by Hiroyuki Shibamoto.
- Formica Regia (フォルミカ・レギア, Forumika Regia): The Queen Ant Lords (クイーンアントロード, Kuīn Anto Rōdo) who appears exclusively in the film Kamen Rider Agito the Movie: Project G4. She is destroyed by Agito. Voiced by Hiromi Tsuru (鶴 ひろみ, Tsuru Hiromi).

=== Overlord ===
The Overlord (オーヴァーロード, Ōvārōdo), also known as the Mysterious Youth (謎の青年, Nazo no Seinen) and the Power of Darkness (闇の力, Yami no Chikara), is the master of the Lords and the creator of the human race and all life on Earth. Early in humanity's history, the Overlord and his twin brother, the Power of Light (光の力, Hikari no Chikara), battled. Defeated, the Overlord's brother used his remaining life force to bestow his power to select humans, allowing them to one day evolve into Agito. The Overlord directs the Lords to kill any humans who possess this potential to evolve into Agito, fearing that they will one day evolve beyond his control. Constant defeats and the increasing power of Kamen Rider Agito convince the Overlord that humanity as a whole should be eliminated. He is eventually defeated by the combined efforts of Kamen Riders Agito, G3-X, and Gills. Having a final conversation with "Tetsuya Sawaki," the Overlord ultimately implies that he will postpone his plans and observe how humans use their own gifts to determine whether or not they are worthy of existence. According to the Kamen Rider Hyper Encyclopedia, his real name is Theos while the Power of Light's real name is Prometh.

The Overlord is portrayed by Rei Haneo (羽緒 レイ, Haneo Rei). As a baby and child, he is portrayed by Yuuki Yagi (八木 優希, Yagi Yūki), Ryunosuke Kamiki (神木 隆之介, Kamiki Ryūnosuke), and Takafumi Anai (穴井 隆文, Anai Takafumi). Rei Haneo and Ryunosuke Kamiki also portray the Overlord's brother as an adult and youth, respectively.

=== Nobuyuki Kazaya ===
Nobuyuki Kazaya (風谷 伸幸, Kazaya Nobuyuki) was Mana's father and Yoshihiko Misugi's step-brother. He was also an acquaintance of the original Shoichi Tsugami and Yukina Sawaki's college professor. Obsessed with Yukina's supernatural powers, he conducted a series of experiments on her with the true Shoichi Tsugami's help. This eventually led to his accidental death at Yukina's hands.

Nobuyuki Kazaya is portrayed by Tōru Nakane (中根 徹, Nakane Tōru).

=== Akatsuki survivors ===
The Akatsuki (あかつき号, Akatsuki-gō) is a ferry where the Power of Light's spirit mysteriously appeared and gave the seed of Agito to the passengers and the captain before Makoto saved them.

- Tomoko Miura (三浦 智子, Miura Tomoko): A passenger who was murdered by the Overlord. Portrayed by Mahiro Morishita (森下 まひろ, Morishita Mahiro).
- Saeko Shinohara (篠原 佐恵子, Shinohara Saeko): A passenger and Tomoko's friend. The trauma of the Akatsuki incident made her catatonic until her brother started planting fake artifacts in a nearby lake for her to excavate, which she connected to the story of an ancient Agito-like warrior. She is attacked by Equus Dies and drowns. Portrayed by Nana Nakamoto (中本 奈奈, Nakamoto Nana).
- Aki Sakaki (榊 亜紀, Sakaki Aki): A passenger. She is sent by fellow Akatsuki survivors to investigate Shoichi, claiming to be a housekeeper sent by Professor Misugi and Shoichi's former lover to get closer to him. She eventually begins to display potent telekinesis, which grows in strength over time. After meeting and developing feelings for Ryo, a combination of her evolving powers and witnessing Ryo as Gills being attacked by the MPD's Agito capture team drives her to homicidal madness. Pantheras Magistra murders her, though Ryo arrives at the scene too late and assumes Agito is her killer. Portrayed by Masako Sakuma (佐久間 雅子, Sakuma Masako).
- Katsuhiko Sagara (相良 克彦, Sagara Katsuhiko): A passenger. He eventually develops powerful telekinesis and regenerative abilities and successfully kills Ryo out of paranoia when his abilities are enhanced by "Tetsuya Sawaki." He also attempts to convince Mana that her powers are evolving beyond her control in a scheme to isolate her and sway her to the Akatsuki survivors' side. He is murdered by Crustata Palleo. Portrayed by Takahiko Tatsuke (田付 貴彦, Tatsuke Takahiko).
- Masumi Sekiya (関谷 真澄, Sekiya Masumi): A passenger. Paranoid and unfriendly, she served as a host to the El of the Water until he gathered enough energy to leave her body, fatally depleting her life-energy as a result. Portrayed by Kami Hiraiwa (平岩 紙, Hiraiwa Kami).
- Kōji Majima (真島 浩二, Majima Kōji): A passenger who came from a line of doctors who was disowned by his family for not following the same path. He gives Ryo his seed of Agito, which allows him to evolve into Exceed Gills. After the Overlord's defeat, Majima decides to give becoming a doctor another try, having been inspired by Kaoru's sacrifice. Portrayed by Yoshikazu Kotani (小谷 嘉一, Kotani Yoshikazu).
- Jun Tachibana (橘 純, Tachibana Jun): A passenger and Masumi's friend. She is murdered by Masumi when the latter is under the El's influence. Portrayed by Urara Tsushima (津嶋 麗, Tsushima Urara).
- Masahide Takashima (高島 雅英, Takashima Masahide): The Akatsuki's captain. He is murdered by Masumi when the latter is under the El's influence. Portrayed by Shoji Maruoka (丸岡 奨詞, Maruoka Shōji).
- Kazuo Ashihara (葦原 和雄, Ashihara Kazuo): A passenger and Ryo's father. Experiencing a mental breakdown, he commits suicide, leaving Ryo his personal effects, which include a list of the Akatsuki's passengers. Portrayed by Junpei Takemoto (竹本 純平, Takemoto Junpei).

==== Kaoru Kino ====
Kaoru Kino (木野 薫, Kino Kaoru) is an unlicensed surgeon and a leader figure to the Akatsuki survivors who is able to transform into a twisted form of Agito known as Another Agito (アナザーアギト, Anazā Agito). (Note: Another Agito is sometimes referred to as Kamen Rider Another Agito (仮面ライダーアナザーアギト, Kamen Raidā Anazā Agito) to differentiate from the Another Agito that appears in Kamen Rider Zi-O.) His brother Masato (雅人) died in a mountain-climbing accident during a snowstorm, with Kaoru losing an arm to severe frostbite in the same event. His brother's arm was grafted on to replace the one he lost, which caused his medical license to be revoked. The arm causes him frequent pain he believes to be Masato's spirit trying to influence him. Despite now being unlicensed, Kaoru is frequently hired by local hospitals because of his skills, once successfully performing two difficult surgeries simultaneously. Already traumatized by his brother's death, Kaoru's awakened Agito powers further worsen his mental state, causing him to develop a Messiah complex where he believes himself to be the only Agito the world needs. This delusion brings him into conflict with the other Riders several times until he is defeated by the newly evolved Exceed Gills and humbled. From then on, he becomes an ally to the other Riders, even once performing surgery on Shoichi to remove Ericius Liquor's venomous quill. He is severely injured in a battle with Volucris Falco and eventually dies from his injuries, with his last thought being a fantasy where he successfully saves his brother.

As Another Agito, Kaoru sports Bio Claw (バイオクロウ, Baio Kurou) blades on his limbs. His personal vehicle is the Dark Hopper (ダークホッパー, Dāku Hoppā) motorcycle. When his power reaches its peak, the Crusher (クラッシャー, Kurasshā) mouth on his faceplate opens, allowing him to perform the Assault Kick (アサルトキック, Asaruto Kikku) and Assault Punch (アサルトパンチ, Asaruto Panchi) finishers.

During the events of the web series Kamen Sentai Gorider, Kuroto Dan arranges the resurrection of Kaoru, among other deceased Kamen Riders, to lure Emu Hojo into the Game World and kill him. However, Kazuma Kenzaki arrives to help Emu and the revived Riders stop Kuroto. During the fight, Kaoru assumes the form of Midorider (ミドライダー, Midoraidā) before joining the other fallen Riders in sacrificing themselves to defeat Kuroto and ensure Emu and Kazuma's escape.

As of the events of the film Agito: Psychic War, Kaoru has been resurrected through unknown means. As part of his plan to evolve humans into Gill Agitos (ギル・アギト, Giru Agito), he uses the virus-like Agito factor, which he extracted from Gills' corpse, as a panacea for terminally ill patients. He becomes Shining Gill Agito (シャイニング・ギル・アギト, Shainingu Giru Agito), only to be destroyed by G7.

Kaoru Kino is portrayed by Takanori Kikuchi (菊池 隆則, Kikuchi Takanori).

=== "Tetsuya Sawaki" ===
"Tetsuya Sawaki" (沢木 哲也, Sawaki Tetsuya), in truth, the real Shoichi Tsugami, is a man resurrected by the Overlord due to his passive involvement in the death of the first Agito, Yukina Sawaki. He was romantically involved with Yukina and tried to stop her from committing suicide, but ultimately allowed her to plummet to her death. The guilt drove him to commit suicide afterwards. After the Overlord resurrects him, he adopts the name of Yukina's younger brother and requests power from the Overlord. The Overlord complies by granting him a portion of his power, which manifests as telepathy and the ability to accelerate the evolution of Agito seed bearers. He soon turns against the Overlord when he realizes what the Overlord's ultimate plan is, using his abilities to help the Agito seed bearers nurture and evolve their powers. He eventually manages to redeem himself by saving Kana before the Overlord grants him his rest to view mankind's future alongside him.

"Tetsuya Sawaki" is portrayed by Atsushi Ogawa (小川 敦史, Ogawa Atsushi).

=== Yukina Sawaki ===
Yukina Sawaki (沢木 雪菜, Sawaki Yukina) was the older sister of Tetsuya Sawaki, now known as Shoichi Tsugami, who committed suicide out of fear after discovering she was becoming the very first Agito. She was involved in the paranormal research conducted by Professor Kazaya at Jyohoku University; this resulted in severe trauma and led her to unconsciously kill Nobuyuki Kazaya.

Yukina Sawaki is portrayed by Ayumi Kasama (笠間 あゆみ, Kasama Ayumi).

=== Kana Okamura ===
Kana Okamura (岡村 可奈, Okamura Kana) is a part-time chef whom Shoichi meets when he gets a job at his old professor's restaurant after the Unknown attacks stop. Though she dreams of being a chef like her father, she is shown to be clumsy and a poor cook, which causes her to get fired frequently. Her father was murdered by an Unknown, meaning Kana herself is an Agito close to awakening. Fear of her transformation causes her to attempt suicide, but Shoichi and "Tetsuya" manage to save her in time, encouraging her to keep living.

Kana Okamura is portrayed by Eriko Moriwaki (森脇 英理子, Moriwaki Eriko).

=== Risa Mizuhara ===
Risa Mizuhara (水原 リサ, Mizuhara Risa) is a delinquent motorcyclist who was once a star runner in high school before an injury ostracized her from her former teammates. She turned to reckless street racing in order to run away from her past, which gained her a reputation as the outlaw biker "Scorpion." Ryo meets her while he is working part-time at a motorcycle shop after the Unknown attacks stop. He eventually befriends her and helps her make peace with her past. However, she becomes one of the victims of the Overlord's culling of humans born under the Scorpio sign, dying in front of Ryo just as they meet to celebrate his birthday.

Risa Mizuhara is portrayed by Mina Mizuki (水稀 未那, Mizuki Mina).

== Spin-off characters ==
=== Azuma Kunieda ===
Azuma Kunieda (国枝 東, Kunieda Azuma) is a psychologist and friend of Yoshihiko Misugi who appears exclusively in the television special Kamen Rider Agito Special: A New Transformation. He nursed Shoichi back to health after he washed ashore and would later place him in the care of Yoshihiko Misugi. A year later, he visits the Misugi household to catch up with Shoichi, who has to quickly leave when he senses an Unknown, with Azuma following to watch the battle. Shoichi soon attacks Azuma when he loses control in Burning Form, causing Shoichi to flee in fear of his powers. Catching up to Shoichi, Azuma reveals that his son also began evolving into an Agito and committed suicide because of it. He restores Shoichi's confidence by telling him not to lose hope and reminding him of the clear skies he saw while in the hospital, which allows Shoichi to fully master Burning Form's power and evolve into Shining Form.

Azuma Kunieda is portrayed by Masaki Kyomoto (京本 政樹, Kyōmoto Masaki).

=== Sayaka Kahara ===
Sayaka Kahara (加原 紗綾香, Kahara Sayaka) is a girl with the psychic ability of clairvoyance who appears exclusively in the film Kamen Rider Agito the Movie: Project G4. She came from a wealthy family and lived relatively well until she was orphaned during a car crash, which killed the rest of her family. She entered the research study at the Japan Ground Self-Defense Force's psychic educational facility as a candidate psychic for the G4 project.

Sayaka Kahara is portrayed by Akane Kimura (木村 茜, Kimura Akane).

=== Rei Motoki ===
Rei Motoki (本木 レイ, Motoki Rei) is a boy gifted with psychic abilities who appears exclusively in the film Kamen Rider Agito the Movie: Project G4. He, like most children in the Japan Ground Self-Defense Force's psychic educational facility, was orphaned at a young age.

Rei Motoki is portrayed by Rikiya Otaka (大高 力也, Ōtaka Rikiya).

=== Risa Fukami ===
Risa Fukami (深海 理沙, Fukami Risa) is a captain of the Japan Ground Self-Defense Force who appears exclusively in the film Kamen Rider Agito the Movie: Project G4. Assigned to the G3 Unit, she steals the data of the G4 System from Ozawa's computer to create the G4 suit, intending to continue the JSDF's experiments and mass-produce the G4 System. She is mauled to death by the Ant Lords.

Risa Fukami is portrayed by Maju Ozawa (小沢 真珠, Ozawa Maju).

=== Shiro Mizuki ===
Shiro Mizuki (水城 史朗, Mizuki Shirō) is a second lieutenant of the Japan Ground Self-Defense Force who appears exclusively in the film Kamen Rider Agito the Movie: Project G4. A jaded man obsessed with the concept of embracing death, he becomes Kamen Rider G4 (仮面ライダーG4(ジーフォー), Kamen Raidā Jī Fō; Generation 4), wielding the GM-01 Custom Type 4 (GM-01改4式, Jī Emu Zero Wan Kai Yon-shiki) handgun and the large Gigant (ギガント, Giganto) missile launcher. Much like the G3 suit series, the G4 suit also utilizes a Gauge Lamp G Buckle (ゲージランプGバックル, Gēji Rampu Jī Bakkuru) belt which displays a battery/status gauge on the buckle. The operator can also plug the Gigant launcher into the side of the belt to power and fire it. Sumiko originally shelved the G4 system after deeming it too dangerous for normal humans, as it uses the mind of a person with psychic abilities as the basis for its onboard predictive AI, making it more powerful than the one installed on G3-X. This system places intense strain on the suit's operator with extended use, which killed several prior test subjects and ultimately leads to Shiro's own death as he battles Makoto in G3-X. The suit's AI takes over soon afterward, attempting to rise and continue the battle, but Makoto destroys it for good.

Shiro Mizuki is portrayed by Ryo Karato (唐渡 亮, Karato Ryō).

=== Ruriko Aoi ===
Ruriko Aoi (葵 るり子, Aoi Ruriko) is a police officer who appears exclusively in the film Agito: Psychic War. As a member of the Tokyo Metropolitan Police Department's G Unit, she becomes Kamen Rider G6 (仮面ライダーG6(ジーシックス), Kamen Raidā Jī Shikkusu; Generation 6) where she is equipped with a back-mounted flight unit and dual wields a pair of GH-09 Orthrus (GH-09 オルトロス, Jī Eichi Zero Nain Orutorosu) handguns. The G6 System, like its predecessors, utilizes a Gauge Lamp G Buckle (ゲージランプGバックル, Gēji Rampu Jī Bakkuru) belt, which displays a battery/status gauge on the buckle. As a secondary infected person compatible with the Agito factor, she gains pyrokinesis and the ability to transform into Trinity Gill Agito (トリニティ・ギル・アギト, Toriniti Giru Agito), allowing her to wield the Storm Halberd and Flame Saber.

Prior to Psychic War, Ruriko cameos in the thirty-second episode of Kamen Rider ZEZTZ.

Ruriko Aoi is portrayed by Yuchami (ゆうちゃみ, Yūchami).

=== Kijima and Kagawa ===
Kijima (杵島) and Kagawa (香川) are police officers who appear exclusively in the film Agito: Psychic War. As members of the Tokyo Metropolitan Police Department's G Unit, Kagawa and Kijima becomes Kamen Riders G3-X and G3 respectively. As secondary infected people incompatible with the Agito factor, they are hospitalized due to necrosis throughout their bodies.

Kijima and Kagawa are portrayed by Sosuke Ogata (小方 蒼介, Ogata Sōsuke) and Minami Sakuma (佐久間 美波, Sakuma Minami).

=== Rouge ===
Rouge (ルージュ, Rūju) is a drag queen and primary infected person of the Agito factor who has telekinesis and teleportation capabilities and appears exclusively in the film Agito: Psychic War. Rouge in his Gill Agito form is destroyed by G7.

Rouge is portrayed by Hiroaki Iwanaga (岩永 洋昭, Iwanaga Hiroaki).

=== Haruma Kitou ===
Haruma Kitou (鬼頭 春馬, Kitō Haruma) is a former nursery teacher and primary infected person of the Agito factor who has pyro- and cryokinesis and appears exclusively in the film Agito: Psychic War. Kitou in his Gill Agito form is destroyed by G7.

Haruma Kitou is portrayed by Suzunosuke (鈴之助).

=== Shibukawa ===
Shibukawa (渋川) is a primary infected person of the Agito factor who has electrokinesis and appears exclusively in the film Agito: Psychic War. Shibukawa in her Gill Agito form is destroyed by G7.

Shibukawa is portrayed by Kokoro Aoshima (青島 心, Aoshima Kokoro).

=== Hayami ===
Hayami (速見) is a primary infected person of the Agito factor who has chronokinesis and the ability to transform parts of his body into metal and appears exclusively in the film Agito: Psychic War. Hayami in his Gill Agito form is destroyed by G7.

Hayami is portrayed by Satoshi Kanada (金田 哲, Kanada Satoshi).

=== Kurotani ===
Kurotani (黒谷) is a secondary infected person compatible with the Agito factor who has the ability to fire bullets from his hands, cooperates with the G Unit, and appears exclusively in the film Agito: Psychic War.

Kurotani is portrayed by Yuki Imai (今井 悠貴, Imai Yūki).

=== Oyama ===
Oyama (大山, Ōyama) is a leader among the inmates in the prison, where Makoto Hikawa is incarcerated, and primary infected person of the Agito factor who has the ability to become invisible and appears exclusively in the film Agito: Psychic War.

Oyama is portrayed by Ryusuke Komakine (駒木根 隆介, Komakine Ryūsuke).

=== Hiraoka ===
Hiraoka (平岡) is a cellmate with Makoto Hikawa who appears exclusively in the film Agito: Psychic War.

Hiraoka is portrayed by Kenzo Ryu (笠 兼三, Ryū Kenzō).

=== Kasumi Murano ===
Kasumi Murano (村野 かすみ, Murano Kasumi) is Tōru Hōjō's ex-fiancée who was murdered by Rouge two years ago and appears exclusively in the film Agito: Psychic War.

Kasumi Murano is portrayed by Becky (ベッキー, Bekkī).
