= Kamen Rider Kuuga =

- Also known as: Masked Rider Kuuga
- Genre: Tokusatsu; Superhero fiction Supernatural; Action; Drama; Police procedural Horror fiction
- Created by: Shotaro Ishinomori
- Written by: Naruhisa Arakawa
- Directed by: Hidenori Ishida
- Starring: Joe Odagiri; Shingo Katsurayama; Kazumi Murata; Wakana Chizaki; Kitaro; Mie Nanamori; Kenji Urai Kaori Mizushima Nobuyuki Yoneyama Takashi Matsuyama Eri Tanaka
- Opening theme: "Kamen Rider Kuuga!" by Masayuki Tanaka
- Ending theme: "Aozora ni Naru" by Jin Hashimoto
- Composer: Toshihiko Sahashi
- Country of origin: Japan
- No. of episodes: 49

Production
- Producers: Yumi Shimizu (TV Asahi); Takeyuki Suzuki (Toei); Shigenori Takatera (Toei)
- Running time: 20–25 minutes
- Production companies: TV Asahi; Toei Company; Asatsu-DK

Original release
- Network: ANN (TV Asahi)
- Release: January 30, 2000 – January 21, 2001

Related
- Kamen Rider Black RX; Shin Kamen Rider: Prologue; Kamen Rider ZO; Kamen Rider J; Kamen Rider Agito

Kamen Rider Kuuga (仮面ライダークウガ, Kamen Raidā Kūga) is a Japanese tokusatsu television series. It is the 10th installment of the popular Kamen Rider Series of tokusatsu shows and the first of the series to air entirely in the Heisei period, as well as the first standalone Kamen Rider TV series since Kamen Rider Black RX and the first series of the revived run of Kamen Rider, bringing Kamen Rider into the 21st century.

It was a joint collaboration between Asatsu-DK and Toei, and was shown on TV Asahi from January 30, 2000, to January 21, 2001, replacing Moero!! Robocon in its timeslot. Kamen Rider Kuuga is the first Kamen Rider Series to be broadcast in a widescreen (letterboxed) format, albeit cropped during airing. It aired alongside Mirai Sentai Timeranger.

== Synopsis ==
Long ago, the Gurongi Tribe terrorized the Linto Tribe until a warrior acquired the power of Kuuga and defeated the Gurongi, sealing their leader within a cave along with him. In the present day, Kuuga's mysterious stone belt is excavated, freeing the Gurongi as they resume their murderous game on the Linto Tribe's descendants: humanity itself. But a multi-talented man named Yusuke Godai finds himself drawn to the belt and becomes the new Kuuga. He helped assemble the Science Police to fight the Gurongi to ensure the happiness and safety of others. But as the endgame draws near, Yusuke learns of a horrible revelation between Kuuga and the Gurongi Tribe's leader.

== Characters ==
=== Main/Supporting ===
Yusuke Godai (五代 雄介, Godai Yūsuke)
A 24-year-old (later 25-year-old in episode 9) young, multi-talented adventurer. He is a happy-go-lucky and honest person that fights to "protect everyone's smiles". Yusuke helps out at the Pole Pole while staying at the shop, and continuously attempts to master 2000 different skills and talents which he uses to help others. He lost his father, a war photographer, when he was a sixth-grade elementary school student, before losing his mother at the age of 18. He was born in Hokkaido on March 18, 1975. After putting it on for the first time, the Arcle (アークル, Ākuru) belt fuses with Yusuke. It contains a Spirit Stone Amadam (霊石アマダム, Reiseki Amadamu), which is the belt's power source that allows Yusuke to transform into the warrior Kuuga (クウガ, Kūga).

As Kuuga, Yusuke has access to a number of different colored forms, each with their own strengths and weaknesses. He is also able to morph certain objects into weapons for his various forms. He later gains the ability to temporarily enhance his four main forms into gold-accented Rising (ライジング, Raijingu) forms after getting electric shocks, which Yusuke refers to as the "Golden Power" (金の力, Kin no Chikara). The police refer to Kuuga as "Unidentified Life Form #4" (未確認生命体第4号, Mikakunin Seimeitai Dai Yon-gō) until Yusuke reveals his identity to them and begins officially working with them.

During his fight against the Gurongi Tribe, Yusuke rides the Try Chaser 2000 (トライチェイサー2000, Torai Cheisā Nisen; TRCS-2000) and later Beat Chaser 2000 (ビートチェイサー2000, Bīto Cheisā Nisen; BTCS-2000) police motorcycles provided by the Metro PD. The Armor Machine Gouram (装甲機ゴウラム, Sōkōki Gōramu), a stag beetle-like entity assisting Kuuga, can attach itself to Yusuke's motorcycles as armor to form the Try Gouram (トライゴウラム, Torai Gōramu) and later the Beat Gouram (ビートゴウラム, Bīto Gōramu), which can also combine with the energy of his Rising forms to become the Rising Beat Gouram (ライジングビートゴウラム, Raijingu Bīto Gōramu).

- Growing Form (グローイングフォーム, Gurōing Fōmu): Yusuke's incomplete form, also known as "White Kuuga" (白のクウガ, Shiro no Kūga), that he is forced to assume whenever he is injured, after which he is unable to transform again for two hours. His finisher in this form is the Growing Kick (グローイングキック, Gurōingu Kikku). The police initially refer to this form as "Unidentified Life Form #2" (未確認生命体第2号, Mikakunin Seimeitai Dai Ni-gō) and believe it to be a separate being from Kuuga's other forms until they learn about Kuuga's form-changing powers.
- Mighty Form (マイティフォーム, Maiti Fōmu): Yusuke's default form, also known as "Red Kuuga" (赤のクウガ, Aka no Kūga), that grants superhuman agility. His finisher in this form is the Mighty Kick (マイティキック, Maiti Kikku).
  - Rising Mighty (ライジングマイティ, Raijingu Maiti): An evolution of Mighty Form that equips Yusuke with the Mighty Anklet (マイティアンクレット, Maiti Ankuretto), which increases the power of his Mighty Kick into the Rising Mighty Kick (ライジングマイティキック, Raijingu Maiti Kikku).
  - Amazing Mighty (アメイジングマイティ, Ameijingu Maiti): A black-colored evolution of Rising Mighty and Yusuke's super form that equips him with a second Mighty Anklet, which increases the power of his Rising Mighty Kick into the Amazing Mighty Kick (アメイジングマイティキック, Ameijingu Maiti Kikku).
- Dragon Form (ドラゴンフォーム, Doragon Fōmu): An auxiliary form, also known as "Blue Kuuga" (青のクウガ, Ao no Kūga), that grants superhuman speed. In this form, Yusuke can morph any pole or stick-like object into the Dragon Rod (ドラゴンロッド, Doragon Roddo) staff, which allows him to perform the Splash Dragon (スプラッシュドラゴン, Supurasshu Doragon) finisher.
  - Rising Dragon (ライジングドラゴン, Raijingu Doragon): An evolution of Dragon Form that enhances the Dragon Rod into the double-bladed Rising Dragon Rod (ライジングドラゴンロッド, Raijingu Doragon Roddo), which increases the power of Yusuke's Splash Dragon into the Rising Splash Dragon (ライジングスプラッシュドラゴン, Raijingu Supurasshu Doragon).
- Pegasus Form (ペガサスフォーム, Pegasasu Fōmu): An auxiliary form, also known as "Green Kuuga" (緑のクウガ, Midori no Kūga), that grants superhuman senses. In this form, Yusuke can morph any gun-like object into the Pegasus Bowgun (ペガサスボウガン, Pegasasu Bōgan), which allows him to perform the Blast Pegasus (ブラストペガサス, Burasuto Pegasasu) finisher. However, he can only use this form for 50 seconds before succumbing to sensory overload and being forced into Growing Form.
  - Rising Pegasus (ライジングペガサス, Raijingu Pegasasu): An evolution of Pegasus Form that enhances the Pegasus Bowgun into the rapid-fire Rising Pegasus Bowgun (ライジングペガサスボウガン, Raijingu Pegasasu Bōgan), which increases the power of Yusuke's Blast Pegasus into the Rising Blast Pegasus (ライジングブラストペガサス, Raijingu Burasuto Pegasasu). He can also use this form 30 seconds longer than Pegasus Form.
- Titan Form (タイタンフォーム, Taitan Fōmu): An auxiliary form, also known as "Purple Kuuga" (紫のクウガ, Murasaki no Kūga), that grants superhuman strength. In this form, Yusuke can morph any pole or stick-like object into the Titan Sword (タイタンソード, Taitan Sōdo), which allows him to perform the Calamity Titan (カラミティタイタン, Karamiti Taitan) finisher.
  - Rising Titan (ライジングタイタン, Raijingu Taitan): An evolution of Titan Form that enhances the Titan Sword into the longer and broader Rising Titan Sword (ライジングタイタンソード, Raijingu Taitan Sōdo), which increases the power of Yusuke's Calamity Titan into the Rising Calamity Titan (ライジングカラミティタイタン, Raijingu Karamiti Taitan). He can also produce a second Rising Titan Sword for dual wielding and to perform the stronger Double Rising Calamity Titan (ダブルライジングカラミティタイタン, Daburu Raijingu Karamiti Taitan) finisher.
- Ultimate Form (アルティメットフォーム, Arutimetto Fōmu): Yusuke's black-colored final form, also known as the "Supreme Warrior" (最高の戦士, Saikō no Senshi), that grants the combined powers of his four main forms. However, he risks losing control in this form, which changes its eye color from red to black.
  - Rising Ultimate (ライジングアルティメット, Raijingu Arutimetto): A gold-colored evolution of Ultimate Form that is exclusively used by Yusuke's A.R. World counterpart Yusuke Onodera.

Kaoru Ichijo (一条 薫, Ichijō Kaoru)
A 25-year-old (later 26-year-old in episode 15) assistant police inspector of the Security Division of the Nagano Prefectural PD. He is sent to the Unidentified Life Form Joint Task Force Office, which is set up in the Metro PD to investigate and counter the Gurongi. Like his father, who died on his tenth birthday, Ichijo is a model policeman who firmly believes in doing the right thing. Though he is very strict with himself, he will do everything he can, even bend police rules, to help Yusuke fight the Gurongi. After the Gurongi were defeated, Ichijo returns to Nagano. He was born in Nagoya on April 18, 1974.
Sakurako Sawatari (沢渡 桜子, Sawatari Sakurako)
A 23-year-old friend of Yusuke from a university and a graduate student at Johnan University who translates the ancient "Lintonese" transcripts that tell of Kuuga and the Gurongi. At first, she was against helping because she was worried about Yusuke, but now she believes in him fully and works hard to help Yusuke understand his powers by deciphering the writings. She was born in Gunma Prefecture on October 30, 1976.
Minori Godai (五代 みのり, Godai Minori)
Yusuke's 22-year-old younger sister who works as a teacher at Wakaba Nursery School. Yusuke occasionally visited her there to entertain the kids. Like Sakurako, she was at first apprehensive about her brother transforming into Kuuga, but she believes in Yusuke and helps out however she can. She was born in Hokkaido on September 4, 1977.
Shuichi Tsubaki (椿 秀一, Tsubaki Shūichi)
A 26-year-old forensic doctor at Kanto Medical University Hospital and a trusted friend of Ichijo from high school, he is the doctor who looks after Yusuke and treats him when he becomes injured, while also researching the effects of Yusuke's fusion with the Arcle. Though he is a light-hearted person, he was very serious and worried when talking about Yusuke's future transformations because of the constant dangers that surrounded the Kuuga legend. He also performs the autopsies of the Gurongi victims to determine the causes of death.
Hikari Enokida (榎田 ひかり, Enokida Hikari)
A 34-year-old researcher of the National Research Institute of Police Science, she studies the biology of the Gurongi to develop effective weapons against them. She also assists in the study of Kuuga and the Gouram. Because of the massive amount of work required of her to fight the Gurongi, she was away from home quite often and her child felt lonely and neglected.
Tamasaburo Kazari (飾 玉三郎, Kazari Tamasaburō)
A 44-year-old former adventurer, he was friends with the father of Yusuke and Minori, who affectionately refer to him as Pops (おやっさん, Oyassan) like everyone else. He owns and runs the Pole Pole. He is a goofy, light-hearted character that keeps a scrapbook of all of Kuuga's exploits from the newspaper, though unaware of Yusuke being "ULF 04" and thinks that the name "Kuuga" is some nonsensical word made up by Yusuke. After learning the truth, however, he dons the Kuuga mark on his apron in the series epilogue. He was born on June 9, 1955.
Nana Asahina (朝比奈 奈々, Asahina Nana)
Tamasaburo's 17-year-old niece from Kyoto Prefecture, who helps out at the Pole Pole while aspiring to be an actress. However, since the death of her acting teacher at the hands of Gurongi, Nana has been troubled until Yusuke finally helps her overcome her sadness.
Jean Michel Sorrel (ジャン・ミッシェル・ソレル, Jan Missheru Soreru)
A 27-year-old graduate student at Johnan University from France that shares the work office with Sakurako. He researched the broken fragments that later formed into Gouram. He has a crush on Enokida and hoped to help her reconnect with her child.
Sadao Matsukura (松倉 貞雄, Matsukura Sadao)
The 57-year-old head of the Security Bureau of the Metro PD and the head of the Unidentified Life Form Joint Task Force Office.
Morimichi Sugita (杉田 守道, Sugita Morimichi)
A 37-year-old detective of the First Investigation Division of the Metro PD who is also a member of the Unidentified Life Form Joint Task Force Office.
Tsuyoshi Sakurai (桜井 剛, Sakurai Tsuyoshi)
A 26-year-old detective of the First Investigation Division of the Metro PD who is also a member of the Unidentified Life Form Joint Task Force Office.
Nozomi Sasayama (笹山 望見, Sasayama Nozomi)
A 21-year-old policewoman of the Unidentified Life Form Joint Task Force Office who sends communication from headquarters.
Mika Natsume (夏目 実加, Natsume Mika)
The 14-year-old daughter of Professor Kokichi Natsume (夏目 幸吉, Natsume Kōkichi), and one of Daguva's victims, she was greatly depressed when her father's murder was being overlooked for the Gurongi attacks, taking the findings her father had at their house. But after Yusuke reasons with her, Mika decides to aid in the Gurongi matter as Jean's assistant. However, she is unable to follow and decides to take up playing the flute her father gave her. But while attending the 12th Arikawa Group Flute Competition, a hostage situation by a disgruntled government worker traumatizes Mika as Yusuke tells her not to run from her fear and continue. Three months later, Mika attended a special college.
Akiji Kanzaki (神崎 昭二, Kanzaki Akiji)
Yusuke's 52-year-old elementary school teacher, he served as an inspiration to Yusuke, and the two of them visit on certain occasions.
Junichi Chono (蝶野 潤一, Chōno Jun'ichi)
A 22-year-old young troubled man, he saw the Gurongi as salvation until he was saved by Kuuga. He later researched trying to make a living until he was knocked out by Go·Gamego·Re (ゴ・ガメゴ・レ) while on his way to a contest.

=== Gurongi Tribe ===
The Gurongi Tribe (グロンギ族, Gurongi-zoku) is a mysterious ancient civilization whose members can transform into monsters to kill people for their ruthless game, referred to in their language as the "Gegeru" (ゲゲル; Game). The 200 members of the Gurongi made their rival civilization the Linto (リント, Rinto), humanity's ancestors before they were defeated and sealed by the original Kuuga, the Ancient Warrior (古代の戦士, Kodai no Senshi). However, the seal was undone in 2000 with the Gurongi resuming their Gegeru on the human race that are the Linto's descendants to bring about the "Ultimate Darkness" (究極の闇, Kyūkyoku no Yami), when humanity will become as violent as the Gurongi.

The Gurongi are classified as Unidentified Life Forms (未確認生命体, Mikakunin Seimeitai; also known as "ULF"), while those that have a human form are labeled "B" (B群, Bī-gun). Each of the Gurongi possesses a stylized Gedorudo (ゲドルード, Gedorūdo) belt with a Magic Stone Geburon (魔石ゲブロン, Maseki Geburon). The naming pattern of the Gurongi is "Group·Species·Creature type": the first part denotes their rank, the second part is the personal name, and the third part indicates the type of animal they resemble. Only 25 out of the 200 Gurongi appeared in the course of the series.

In the series, the Gurongi speak in their own native language (originally created by the producers as a cipher of the Japanese language) which was left purposely unsubtitled during the original broadcast to prevent the audience from learning the series' mysteries and plot twists (as it was referred by them in the early episodes). The Xu Group is the first to play in the Gegeru, then the Me, and finally the Go in the Gerizagibas Gegeru (ゲリザギバスゲゲル, Gerizagibasu Gegeru; Semi-final Game). The Gegeru is overseen by the two La Gurongi, and the winner of the Gerizagibas Gegeru receives the right to challenge their leader, N·Daguva·Zeba, to a duel known as the Zagibas Gegeru (ザギバスゲゲル, Zagibasu Gegeru; Final Game) for the leadership of the Gurongi.

The La Group (ラ集団, Ra Shūdan) are the judges of the Gegeru and are Daguva's right-hand men. The Nu Group (ヌ集団, Nu Shūdan) crafts the artifacts used by the other groups. The Xu Group (ズ集団, Zu Shūdan) contains lower-tier Gurongi under Xu·Zain·Da, most of their kin slaughtered by Daguva as they failed to acquire the right to participate. Those who did qualify are brought into the Gegeru by writing their names on the portable Dodozo (ドドゾ; Board) blackboard and using the beads of their Guzepa (グゼパ; Udewa) bracelets to mark the number of people they have killed. The Me Group (メ集団, Me Shūdan) are middle-tier Gurongi led by Me·Garima·Ba, its members brought into the Gegeru by using the Bagundada (バグンダダ; Counter) abacus to predict the number of people they are to kill and the period to accomplish that. The Go Group (ゴ集団, Go Shūdan) are high-tier Gurongi who can transmute their ornaments into weapons like Kuuga displays while in his Dragon, Pegasus, and Titan forms. Unlike the lesser tiers, the Go having La·Doldo·Gu tally their kills for them while creating their rules of conducting their kills. The Go who completes the Gegeru, or the one who can defeat all the Go class Gurongi, earns the right to fight Daguva for control of the entire Gurongi Tribe. Their leader is Go·Gadol·Ba, one of the three strongest Go Gurongi who had modified themselves to alter their forms like Kuuga and Daguva. The lowest Be Group (ベ集団, Be Shūdan) were all murdered by Daguva without acquiring the right of the Gegeru.

N·Daguva·Zeba (ン・ダグバ・ゼバ, N Daguba Zeba)
The stag beetle-like lord of the Gurongi and the primary antagonist of the series, called by his kin as the "harbinger of ultimate darkness" (究極の闇をもたらす者, Kyūkyoku no Yami o Motarasu Mono). Sealed away by the previous Kuuga, the Ancient Warrior, Daguva was resurrected in modern times in his Imperfect Form (不完全体, Fukanzentai), labeled as "Unidentified Life Form #0" (未確認生命体第0号, Mikakunin Seimeitai Dai Zero-gō) by the police, slaughtering the Ancient Warrior's sleeping body and the archaeologists who broke the seal. Spending most of the series killing 152 of his kind he deemed unworthy to participate in the Gegeru, Daguva resurfaces in his fully restored Perfect Form (完全体, Kanzentai). By the time he resurfaces after killing Goma, Daguva assumes the guise of a white-suited young man with an aura whom the police labeled as "Unidentified Life Form B13" (未確認生命体B群13号, Mikakunin Seimeitai Bī-gun Jū-san-gō). After Gadol's death, Daguva begins his endgame with endless heavy rain and initiates a systematic genocide of all people in Japan. He is eventually killed by Yusuke after an epic fight that pushed the other to his limits, Daguva dies from his injuries while mocking Yusuke would become as violent as he is.
La·Balva·De (ラ・バルバ・デ, Ra Baruba De)
A rose-like Gurongi who is only seen in her disguise as the "woman with the rose tattoo" (バラのタトゥの女, Bara no Tatu no On'na) wearing the Gegeru Ring (ゲゲルリング, Gegeru Ringu), labeled "Unidentified Life Form B1" (未確認生命体B群1号, Mikakunin Seimeitai Bī-gun Ichi-gō). She serves as the judge for both Xu and Me Groups, authorizing any member of the Gurongi to enter the Gegeru. Following her many encounters with Ichijo, including one where he injured her, Balva realizes that humans can no longer be underestimated. Once Daguva begins his rampage, she is encountered by Ichijo who hints that humans will soon become like the Gurongi before running off, with Ichijo being forced to shoot her with eight nerve-breaking bullets. Her body falls into the sea and is never found.
La·Doldo·Gu (ラ・ドルド・グ, Ra Dorudo Gu)
A condor-like Gurongi armed with a pair of tonfa, assuming the form of a man in black with white robes on him while labeled "Unidentified Life Form #47" (未確認生命体第47号, Mikakunin Seimeitai Dai Yonjū-nana-gō) and "B9" (B群9号, Bī-gun Kyū-gō). He carries the Bagundada abacus which he uses to count the number of kills by the Go Group Gurongi until Ichijo destroyed it with a marking bullet. This forces the purposeless Doldo to fight for his life against Gadol as Ichijo arrives at the scene, Doldo ends up being killed by Sugita and Sakurai using the completed nerve-breaking bullets.
Nu·Zajio·Re (ヌ・ザジオ・レ)
A salamander-like Gurongi and the last of the Nu Group, labeled "Unidentified Life Form B14" (未確認生命体B群14号, Mikakunin Seimeitai Bī-gun Jū-yon-gō). Posing as a middle-aged man, Zajio manages to remain in hiding with his existence unknown to the police while creating the items used by the Gurongi. With Goma's aid, Zajio obtains discarded pieces of Daguva's buckle and refines them to create a means for a Gurongi to have the same abilities as Daguva and Kuuga, so those in the Gegeru can defend themselves against Daguva. In the end, Zajio is eventually killed by Daguva just as he finished his final work. Like Balva, Zajio's true form was never revealed.
Xu·Goma·Gu (ズ・ゴオマ・グ, Zu Gōma Gu)
A photophobic vampire bat-like Gurongi labeled "Unidentified Life Form #3" (未確認生命体第3号, Mikakunin Seimeitai Dai San-gō) and "B2" (B群2号, Bī-gun Ni-gō), Goma initially murdered a preacher named Father Jose and disguised himself to use a church as a base of operations before Ichijo uncovered the truth and the Gurongi is ultimately forced to retreat. Following Xu being removed from play, wearing a trenchcoat and fedora to protect himself, Goma becomes Balva's underling. But Goma retrieved a discarded piece of Daguva's buckle and had it refined before using it to evolve himself into his Enhanced Form (強化体, Kyōkatai) to have freedom of movement in daylight. But it also increased Goma's bloodlust as he turns on Balva and intended to kill Daguva to gain his power, driven off by Gadol as the final stages of his evolution take effect. Fully evolved into his armored Ultimate Form (究極体, Kyūkyokutai), Goma nearly kills Kuuga when Daguva finally arrives. Goma runs off to fight Daguva, only to be slaughtered by him with his corpse used to develop the nerve-breaking bullets. Goma's name in Japanese comes from the readings for "fiend" (強魔, Gōma).
Xu·Zain·Da (ズ・ザイン・ダ, Zu Zain Da)
The hotheaded rhinoceros-like the leader of the Xu Group, labeled "Unidentified Life Form #22" (未確認生命体第22号, Mikakunin Seimeitai Dai Nijū-ni-gō) and "B3" (B群3号, Bī-gun San-gō), assuming the form of a hulking strongman with a temper. Soon after his group was removed from the Gegeru in favor of the Me Group, Zain starts acting on his own after the Gurongi Tribe's first lair was raided, attacking trucks and impaling drivers with his horn. He overpowered Kuuga in both human and Gurongi forms when Me·Byran·Gi (メ・ビラン・ギ, Me Biran Gi) intervened as Zain stole his turn. While Zain resumes his attack on large motor vehicles, Yusuke manages to perfect his Mighty Kick to finally kill the Gurongi.
Me·Galme·Re (メ・ガルメ・レ, Me Garume Re)
A smart chameleon-like Gurongi, labeled "Unidentified Life Form #31" (未確認生命体第31号, Mikakunin Seimeitai Dai Sanjū-ichi-gō) and "B4" (B群4号, Bī-gun Yon-gō). Originally Xu·Galme·Re (ズ・ガルメ・レ, Zu Garume Re), he is promoted between the Gegeru of Unidentified Life Forms #10 and #11, desiring to become a Go and playing a part in murdering Nana's acting teacher. Posing as a man with wild blonde hair, Galme's turn came as he uses his cloaking abilities to hide in high areas, dragging his victims with his tongue to hang them while smashing their faces against a surface, announcing his next location to kill, going for the Komazawa Square and then at the Central Tower, where the police stand by. Learning of a five-minute window, the police attempt to use flash grenades to disrupt Galme's chromatic cellular makeup while learning the reason for the Gurongi attacks. Though the visible Galme outruns the police, he runs into Kuuga as they battle. But once Galme turns invisible to escape, he is killed by Kuuga's Gouram-aided Blast Pegasus. The encounter with Galme, who tends to speak Japanese, together with Ichijo's experience with Balva, leads the police to realize that the Gurongi are capable of speaking their language as well.
Me·Garima·Ba (メ・ガリマ・バ)
The mantis-like leader of the Me Group, labeled "Unidentified Life Form #36" (未確認生命体第36号, Mikakunin Seimeitai Dai Sanjū-roku-gō) and "B6" (B群6号, Bī-gun Roku-gō). Garima has a tattoo on her right pointer and thumbnails and a green streak in her hair while in her human form. While Galme begins his Gegeru, Garima receives a double-bladed scythe/lance as the Go arrives and she was on a train at the Ochanomizu Station, marking victims with her scent. Than she tracks down the 288 victims who left the train prior and strikes them down with her weapon, her victims unaware of their death until they look back to face her. When Kuuga attempts to fight her in Titan Form on the Gouram, Garima manages to endure the Try Gouram Attack and escape in the confusion, wounded but able to continue the Gegeru with her scythe-katana. She was about to kill Sakurako when Yusuke arrives at her aid, assuming Rising Titan and running through Garima.
Go·Badaa·Ba (ゴ・バダー・バ, Go Badā Ba)
A grasshopper-like Gurongi, labeled "Unidentified Life Form #41" (未確認生命体第41号, Mikakunin Seimeitai Dai Yonjū-ichi-gō) and "B8" (B群8号, Bī-gun Hachi-gō). The first of the Go to appear when he intervenes in Kuuga's fight with Goma before leaving the scene and then formally introducing himself when Go·Bemiu·Gi (ゴ・ベミウ・ギ) starts to play. Assuming the form of a young man wearing a red scarf (which pays homage to Kamen Rider 1) and carrying a coin, Badaa rides a motorcycle named the Bagibuson (バギブソン; Cyclone) as his weapon that can reach speeds of 400 km per hour. When his turn came, he begins to kill 99 motorcyclists. When the Try Chaser 2000 is damaged, Kuuga is left at a disadvantage as Badaa leaves with a promise to save him in his Gerizagibas Gegeru. By the time Badaa reached 98, he decides to finish off Kuuga. However, after being barraged with bullets, Badaa is driven into a secluded location where Kuuga meets him on the Beat Chaser 2000, outrunning him and assuming Rising Mighty before he fatally knocked Badaa off his motorcycle.
Go·Gadol·Ba (ゴ・ガドル・バ, Go Gadoru Ba)
The fierce rhinoceros beetle-like the leader of the Go Group and one of the three strongest Go Gurongi, labeled "Unidentified Life Form #46" (未確認生命体第46号, Mikakunin Seimeitai Dai Yonjū-roku-gō) and "B11" (B群11号, Bī-gun Jū-ichi-gō). Armed with various weapons similar to Kuuga, he assumes the form of a man in militant garb. As the Go's leader, he intervenes in the fight between Go·Zazalu·Ba (ゴ・ザザル・バ, Go Zazaru Ba) and Goma and later comes to Balva's aid against a power-mad Goma when Kuuga arrives to witness him putting the bat-like Gurongi back in his place. With Daguva going to Tokyo soon, he and the other two remaining Go Gurongi undergo the same process as Goma to ready themselves. After his two allies were killed, Gadol is the last of the Gurongi to play. After undergoing training to ready himself, Gadol heads to the police department to find worthy opponents to fight as part of his Gerizagibas Gegeru. When confronted by Kuuga in his default Grapple Form (格闘体, Kakutōtai), Gadol reveals his new ability to use the different powers of Kuuga, Quick Form (俊敏体, Shunbintai), Shooting Form (射撃体, Shagekitai), and Herculean Form (剛力体, Gōrikitai), before defeating Kuuga at full power in Shocker Form (電撃体, Dengekitai). But due to Ichijo, Gadol's Gerizagibas Gegeru had to be reset as the Gurongi attempts to kill Doldo for failing his part. After Doldo retreats, angry Gadol attempts to kill Ichijo upon being wounded by the officer's nerve-breaking bullets as Yusuke arrives to battle the Gurongi as Kuuga. Once taking their fight to the woods, Kuuga assumes Amazing Mighty and destroys Shocker Form Gadol.

== Episodes ==
| No. | Title | Directed by | Written by | Original release date |
|---|---|---|---|---|
| 1 | "Revival"; Transliteration: "Fukkatsu" (Japanese: 復活) | Hidenori Ishida | Naruhisa Arakawa | January 30, 2000 |
| 2 | "Transformation"; Transliteration: "Henshin" (Japanese: 変身) | Hidenori Ishida | Naruhisa Arakawa | February 6, 2000 |
| 3 | "Tokyo"; Transliteration: "Tōkyō" (Japanese: 東京) | Katsuya Watanabe | Naruhisa Arakawa | February 13, 2000 |
| 4 | "Sprint"; Transliteration: "Shissō" (Japanese: 疾走) | Katsuya Watanabe | Naruhisa Arakawa | February 20, 2000 |
| 5 | "Distance"; Transliteration: "Kyori" (Japanese: 距離) | Takao Nagaishi | Naruhisa Arakawa | February 27, 2000 |
| 6 | "Azure Dragon"; Transliteration: "Seiryū" (Japanese: 青龍) | Takao Nagaishi | Naruhisa Arakawa | March 5, 2000 |
| 7 | "Grief"; Transliteration: "Shōshin" (Japanese: 傷心) | Hidenori Ishida | Naruhisa Arakawa | March 12, 2000 |
| 8 | "Archer"; Transliteration: "Shashu" (Japanese: 射手) | Hidenori Ishida | Naruhisa Arakawa | March 19, 2000 |
| 9 | "Siblings"; Transliteration: "Kyōdai" (Japanese: 兄妹) | Katsuya Watanabe | Naruhisa Arakawa | March 26, 2000 |
| 10 | "Fierceness"; Transliteration: "Shiretsu" (Japanese: 熾烈) | Katsuya Watanabe | Naruhisa Arakawa | April 2, 2000 |
| 11 | "Promise"; Transliteration: "Yakusoku" (Japanese: 約束) | Takao Nagaishi | Naruhisa Arakawa | April 9, 2000 |
| 12 | "Teacher"; Transliteration: "Onshi" (Japanese: 恩師) | Takao Nagaishi | Naruhisa Arakawa | April 16, 2000 |
| 13 | "Suspicion"; Transliteration: "Fushin" (Japanese: 不審) | Hidenori Ishida | Toshiki Inoue | April 23, 2000 |
| 14 | "Omen"; Transliteration: "Zenchō" (Japanese: 前兆) | Hidenori Ishida | Toshiki Inoue | April 30, 2000 |
| 15 | "Armor"; Transliteration: "Sōkō" (Japanese: 装甲) | Katsuya Watanabe | Naruhisa Arakawa | May 7, 2000 |
| 16 | "Creed"; Transliteration: "Shinjō" (Japanese: 信条) | Katsuya Watanabe | Naruhisa Arakawa | May 14, 2000 |
| 17 | "Preparation"; Transliteration: "Rinsen" (Japanese: 臨戦) | Nobuhiro Suzumura | Tsuyoshi Kida; Katsura Murayama | May 21, 2000 |
| 18 | "Loss"; Transliteration: "Sōshitsu" (Japanese: 喪失) | Takao Nagaishi | Toshiki Inoue | May 28, 2000 |
| 19 | "Artifact"; Transliteration: "Reiseki" (Japanese: 霊石) | Hidenori Ishida | Naruhisa Arakawa | June 4, 2000 |
| 20 | "Smile"; Transliteration: "Egao" (Japanese: 笑顔) | Hidenori Ishida | Naruhisa Arakawa | June 11, 2000 |
| 21 | "Secrets"; Transliteration: "An'yaku" (Japanese: 暗躍) | Katsuya Watanabe | Naruhisa Arakawa | June 25, 2000 |
| 22 | "Game"; Transliteration: "Yūgi" (Japanese: 遊戯) | Katsuya Watanabe | Naruhisa Arakawa | July 2, 2000 |
| 23 | "Uneasiness"; Transliteration: "Fuan" (Japanese: 不安) | Takao Nagaishi | Toshiki Inoue | July 9, 2000 |
| 24 | "Strengthening"; Transliteration: "Kyōka" (Japanese: 強化) | Takao Nagaishi | Toshiki Inoue | July 16, 2000 |
| 25 | "Wandering"; Transliteration: "Hōkō" (Japanese: 彷徨) | Hidenori Ishida | Naruhisa Arakawa | July 23, 2000 |
| 26 | "Myself"; Transliteration: "Jibun" (Japanese: 自分) | Hidenori Ishida | Naruhisa Arakawa | July 30, 2000 |
| 27 | "Ripple"; Transliteration: "Hamon" (Japanese: 波紋) | Katsuya Watanabe | Toshiki Inoue | August 6, 2000 |
| 28 | "Clarification"; Transliteration: "Kaimei" (Japanese: 解明) | Katsuya Watanabe | Toshiki Inoue | August 13, 2000 |
| 29 | "Crossroads"; Transliteration: "Kiro" (Japanese: 岐路) | Takao Nagaishi | Naruhisa Arakawa | August 20, 2000 |
| 30 | "Fate"; Transliteration: "Unmei" (Japanese: 運命) | Takao Nagaishi | Naruhisa Arakawa | August 27, 2000 |
| 31 | "Retaliation"; Transliteration: "Ōsen" (Japanese: 応戦) | Nobuhiro Suzumura | Naruhisa Arakawa; Kiyoshi Takenaka | September 3, 2000 |
| 32 | "Obstacle"; Transliteration: "Shōgai" (Japanese: 障害) | Osamu Kaneda | Toshiki Inoue | September 10, 2000 |
| 33 | "Cooperation"; Transliteration: "Renkei" (Japanese: 連携) | Osamu Kaneda | Toshiki Inoue; Naruhisa Arakawa | September 17, 2000 |
| 34 | "Tremble"; Transliteration: "Senritsu" (Japanese: 戦慄) | Hidenori Ishida | Naruhisa Arakawa | October 1, 2000 |
| 35 | "Emotion"; Transliteration: "Aizō" (Japanese: 愛憎) | Hidenori Ishida | Naruhisa Arakawa | October 8, 2000 |
| 36 | "Complication"; Transliteration: "Sakusō" (Japanese: 錯綜) | Katsuya Watanabe | Naruhisa Arakawa | October 15, 2000 |
| 37 | "Approach"; Transliteration: "Sekkin" (Japanese: 接近) | Katsuya Watanabe | Naruhisa Arakawa | October 22, 2000 |
| 38 | "Transition"; Transliteration: "Henten" (Japanese: 変転) | Takao Nagaishi | Naruhisa Arakawa | October 29, 2000 |
| 39 | "Goma"; Transliteration: "Gōma" (Japanese: 強魔) | Takao Nagaishi | Naruhisa Arakawa | November 12, 2000 |
| 40 | "Impulse"; Transliteration: "Shōdō" (Japanese: 衝動) | Hidenori Ishida | Naruhisa Arakawa | November 19, 2000 |
| 41 | "Control"; Transliteration: "Yokusei" (Japanese: 抑制) | Hidenori Ishida | Naruhisa Arakawa | November 26, 2000 |
| 42 | "Battlefield"; Transliteration: "Senjō" (Japanese: 戦場) | Osamu Kaneda | Naruhisa Arakawa | December 3, 2000 |
| 43 | "Reality"; Transliteration: "Genjitsu" (Japanese: 現実) | Osamu Kaneda | Naruhisa Arakawa | December 10, 2000 |
| 44 | "Crisis"; Transliteration: "Kiki" (Japanese: 危機) | Katsuya Watanabe | Naruhisa Arakawa | December 17, 2000 |
| 45 | "Archenemy"; Transliteration: "Kyōteki" (Japanese: 強敵) | Katsuya Watanabe | Naruhisa Arakawa | December 24, 2000 |
| 46 | "Indomitable"; Transliteration: "Fukutsu" (Japanese: 不屈) | Katsuya Watanabe | Naruhisa Arakawa | December 31, 2000 |
| 47 | "Decision"; Transliteration: "Ketsui" (Japanese: 決意) | Hidenori Ishida | Naruhisa Arakawa | January 7, 2001 |
| 48 | "Kuuga"; Transliteration: "Kūga" (Japanese: 空我) | Hidenori Ishida | Naruhisa Arakawa | January 14, 2001 |
| 49 | "Yusuke"; Transliteration: "Yūsuke" (Japanese: 雄介) | Hidenori Ishida | Naruhisa Arakawa | January 21, 2001 |

== Specials ==
- Kamen Rider Kuuga Super Secret Video: Kamen Rider Kuuga vs. the Strong Monster Go·Jiino·Da (仮面ライダークウガ 超ひみつビデオ 仮面ライダークウガVS剛力怪人ゴ・ジイノ・ダ, Kamen Raidā Kūga Chō Himitsu Bideo Kamen Raidā Kūga Bui Esu Gōriki Kaijin Go Jiino Da): Televi-Kun's special video. In the episode, Yusuke reads through newspaper clippings of his actions as Kuuga before he is called upon to fight a new Gurongi called Go·Jiino·Da. The video also previews Kuuga's Rising Mighty form.
- Kamen Rider Kuuga: New Year Special (仮面ライダークウガ 新春スペシャル, Kamen Raidā Kūga Shinshun Supesharu; 1/2/2001): A rerun of Episodes 17 and 31, and an extra episode, labelled as Episode 46.5 First Dream of the New Year (初夢, Hatsuyume).
- Good Job (乙彼（お疲れ）, Otsukare): A short extra episode, jokingly labelled as "Episode 50".
- Special Chapter (特別篇, Tokubetsuhen): It is compiled from the first two episodes with extra footage.
- Extra Episode: Revisited (EXTRA EPISODE 再訪, Ekusutora Episōdo Saihō): A short recap episode released on YouTube on March 28, 2025, to commemorate the 25th anniversary of the series.

== Production ==
Kamen Rider's TV series has been planned since around 1996, and there was a time when it was originally aimed at broadcasting on The Mainichi Broadcasting Production and TBS series at 6:00 a.m. on Saturdays, which was broadcasting the Ultra series. The initial title is "Kamen Rider XV (CrossBuoy)" and "Kamen Rider Kawakami" and the idea of appearing multiple Kamen Riders presented here has led to the idea of form change by consolidating the number of people to one person. Another project title is "Kamen Rider Gaia", which is said to have competed with "Ultraman Gaia".

In 1997, Sega premiered a series of commercials for their Saturn console in Japan starring Segata Sanshiro, a character played by veteran Kamen Rider actor Hiroshi Fujioka. The popularity of this ad campaign helped to renew interest in the Kamen Rider franchise. According to Takeyuki Suzuki, this renewed interest led to the decision to create a new series. Producer Nariki Takatera also testified that the Kamen Rider Series of prizes in the prize game was also boosting sales. At the time, it was vaguely perceived as a "positive reaction", but this was a sign that the age group coming to the game center became interested in riders, and it was the beginning of viewers of the old work becoming fathers and forming "two generations of parents and children" fans.

Nariki Takatera's plan "Kamen Rider Guardian" has a clear style with a strong hero color, and there is a remnant of Yusuke's character setting. At this point, Takatera had envisioned a line of traditional hero programs so as not to disappoint the expectations of related companies. After that, the plan proposal submitted by Ishimori Pro Kamen Rider OtisAsked to reconsider the direction because of the strong horror color and tragedy, Takatera decided to drastically review it. In other tentative titles, there was also a plan called "Ouja" after the notation in Kanji was proposed.

Takatera's enthusiasm for creating a completely new Kamen Rider was strong, but he said that it would take a budget equivalent to Indiana Jones to realize the fantastic and unconventional hero image of the initial plan, In response to the point that the "half-earthling and alien" setting is too far from the rider's image, we decided to explore ways to add new flavors to traditional riders.

Takatera's idea of "Kamen Rider-likeness" was the composition of "Man and Man" with live figures such as Kazuya Taki and Tobei Tachibana next to a strange hero called Rider. This is used in an actual work in the form of a buddy of Yusuke and Kaoru Ichijo. On the other hand, the element "remodeled human", which was the basic setting of the old work, was considered not to be mandatory and was excluded.

Toei announced a new project, in May 1999. Kuuga was part of a Kamen Rider revival project that Ishinomori had worked on in 1997, planning for a leadup into the 30th anniversary. However, Ishinomori died before he could see these shows materialize. During the summer of 1999, Kuuga became publicized through magazine ads and commercials.

The Kamen Rider Kuuga trademark was registered by Toei on November 8, 1999.

Kuuga also marks Toei's very first Kamen Rider series to be shot in 1080i, though the broadcast, including the recent home video releases, has been scaled down to Standard definition instead.

== Manga ==
Kamen Rider Kuuga: Extra Episode "Trust" (仮面ライダークウガ エクストラエピソード「信頼」, Kamen Raidā Kūga Ekusutora Episōdo Shinrai) is a manga adaptation, published in the 2001 summer vacation special issue of the TeleCoro Comic magazine. It took place between Episodes 22 and 23.

On November 1, 2014, a manga reboot of Kuuga began serialization in Hero's Inc.'s Monthly Hero's magazine. It is written by Toshiki Inoue and illustrated by Hitotsu Yokoshima with the characters of Kamen Rider Agito added. On October 30, 2020, after Monthly Hero's ceased publication, the series was transferred to the Comiplex website. On April 28, 2022, the series was licensed by Titan Publishing Group for English publication under their new manga imprint.

== S.I.C. Hero Saga ==
Kuuga had two S.I.C. Hero Saga stories published in Monthly Hobby Japan magazine. The first story Kamen Rider Kuuga Edition: Odyssey (MASKED RIDER KUUGA EDITION -オデッセイ-, Kamen Raidā Kūga Edishon Odessei) supervised by series producer Shigenori Takatera expands upon the mythology of Kuuga featuring original characters Riku (リク), the previous Kuuga chosen by the Linto, and the original N·Daguva·Zeba (Incomplete) (ン・ダグバ・ゼバ（不完全体）, N Daguba Zeba (Fukanzentai)). The second story Masked Rider Kuuga Edition: Dark Side continues the expansion of the series mythology. These stories take place in an alternate universe, as there are different settings between the stories and Kuuga, like the Linto Tribe with warriors and Daguva's personality. Odyssey ran from February to May 2002. Dark Side ran in a separate special issue titled Hobby Japan Mook S.I.C. Official Diorama Story S.I.C. Hero Saga vol.2.

Odyssey chapter titles

1. Linto (リント, Rinto)
2. Gurongi (グロンギ)
3. Gouram (ゴウラム, Gōramu)
4. Daguva (ダグバ, Daguba)

== Novel ==
Novel: Kamen Rider Kuuga (小説 仮面ライダークウガ, Shōsetsu Kamen Raidā Kūga), written by Naruhisa Arakawa, is part of a series of spin-off novel adaptions of the Heisei Era Kamen Riders. The story takes place 12 years after the series, where Yusuke Godai defeated the Gurongi as Kamen Rider Kuuga. Ichijo is still trying to research the remains of the Gurongi Tribe until rumors of a mysterious "white warrior" (白い戦士, Shiroi Senshi) surfaces on the internet, which reminds Ichijo of Godai. The novel was originally planned to be released on November 30, 2012, however, it was delayed until June 2013.

== Video game ==
A video game based on the series, developed by KAZe and published by Bandai, was released in Japan on December 21, 2000, for the PlayStation. It is a fighting game similar to Tekken.

== Cast ==
- Yusuke Godai: Joe Odagiri (オダギリ ジョー, Odagiri Jō)
- Kaoru Ichijo: Shingo Katsurayama (葛山 信吾, Katsurayama Shingo)
- Sakurako Sawatari: Kazumi Murata (村田 和美, Murata Kazumi)
- Pops (Tamasaburo Kazari): Kitaro (きたろう, Kitarō)
- Minori Godai: Wakana Chizaki (千崎 若菜, Chizaki Wakana) (Played as Wakana Aoi (葵 若菜, Aoi Wakana))
- Shuichi Tsubaki: Yoshitaka Otsuka (大塚 よしたか, Ōtsuka Yoshitaka)
- Hikari Enokida: Kaori Mizushima (水島 かおり, Kaori Mizushima)
- Nana Asahina: Shio Mizuhara (水原 詩生, Mizuhara Shio)
- Jean Michel Sorrel: Serge Vasilov (セルジュ・ヴァシロフ, Seruju Vashirofu)
- Mika Natsume: Yuka Takeshima (竹島 由夏, Takeshima Yuka)
- Sadao Matsukura: Yudai Ishiyama (石山 雄大, Ishiyama Yūdai)
- Morimichi Sugita: Takashi Matsuyama (松山 鷹志, Matsuyama Takashi)
- Tsuyoshi Sakurai: Nobuyuki Yoneyama (米山 信之, Yoneyama Nobuyuki)
- Nozomi Sasayama: Eri Tanaka (田中 恵理, Tanaka Eri)
- Hitoshi Kashihara (柏原 仁, Kashiwabara Jin): Takashi Kikuchi (菊池 隆志, Kikuchi Takashi)
- Junichi Shiina (椎名 純一, Shiina Jun'ichi): Makoto Hatayama (畠山 真, Hatayama Makoto)
- Gohei Ebisawa (海老沢 吾平, Ebisawa Gohei): Fujio Mori (森 富士夫, Mori Fujio)
- Tsurumaru Kameyama (亀山 鶴丸, Kameyama Tsurumaru): Katsuaki Nishide (西手 勝秋, Nishide Katsuaki)
- Akiji Kanzaki: Takashi Inoue (井上 高志, Inoue Takashi)
- Junichi Chono: Daisuke Uchida (内田 大介, Uchida Daisuke)
- Keiko Motoki (元城 恵子, Motoki Keiko): Rie Okada (岡田 理江, Okada Rie)
- Atsuko Enokida (榎田 篤子, Enokida Atsuko): Machiko Naka (中 真千子, Naka Machiko)
- Sayuru Enokida (榎田 冴, Enokida Sayuru): Kentaro Niibo (新穂 健太郎, Niibo Kentarō)
- Hiroyuki Yashiro (社 広之, Yashiro Hiroyuki): Yutaro Kamata (鎌田 雄太郎, Kamata Yūtarō)
- Shuto Terashima (寺島 周斗, Terashima Shūto): Tomoaki Takagi (高木 智晃, Takagi Tomoaki)
- Kanako Suyama (須山 可奈子, Suyama Kanako): Yukako Mino (三野 友華子, Mino Yukako)
- Woman With the Rose Tattoo (La·Balva·De): Mie Nanamori (七森 美江, Nanamori Mie)
- Xu·Goma·Gu: Mitsuru Fujio (藤生 みつる, Fujiō Mitsuru)
- Xu·Zain·Da: Akira Nogami (野上 彰, Nogami Akira)
- Me·Galme·Re: Masaharu Mori (森 雅晴, Mori Masaharu)
- Me·Garima·Ba: Miho Kido (木戸 美歩, Kido Miho) (Played as Miho Iijima (飯島 美穂, Iijima Miho))
- Nu·Zajio·Re: Chu Takatsuki (高月 忠, Takatsuki Chū)
- Xu·Vazuu·Ba (ズ・バヅー・バ, Zu Bazū Ba), Go·Badaa·Ba: Nobuyuki Ogawa (小川 信行, Ogawa Nobuyuki)
- La·Doldo·Gu: Tenmei Basara (婆裟羅 天明, Basara Tenmei)
- Go·Gadol·Ba: Masato Gunji (軍司 眞人, Gunji Masato)
- N·Daguva·Zeba: Kenji Urai (浦井 健治, Urai Kenji)

=== Voice cast ===
- Narrator: Fumihiko Tachiki (立木 文彦, Tachiki Fumihiko)

== Theme songs ==
Opening theme

- "Kamen Rider Kuuga!" (仮面ライダークウガ!, Kamen Raidā Kūga!)
  - Lyrics: Shoko Fujibayashi
  - Composition & Arrangement: Toshihiko Sahashi
  - Artist: Masayuki Tanaka

Ending theme

- "Aozora ni Naru" (青空になる; "Become the Blue Sky")
  - Lyrics: Shoko Fujibayashi
  - Composition & Arrangement: Toshihiko Sahashi
  - Artist: Jin Hashimoto

== Reception and impact ==
The show won Seiun Award for Best Dramatic Presentation in 2002.

The series originated the term Odagiri effect, named after the lead actor Joe Odagiri, which means a television program attracts a larger than expected number of female viewers because the program stars attractive male actors or characters. The producers discovered that, besides the target demographics, Kuuga was also attracting a large audience of women around the age of 30. The show was attracting the mothers of children who found Odagiri attractive. Following this, Odagiri went on to a more high-profile career, while the follow-up series, Kamen Rider Agito attempted to re-create the effect by casting three attractive male actors in the lead. Again, the show attracted large numbers of female viewers, although long-term viewers, mostly men, disapproved.

== Broadcasts, home video and video streaming ==
- In its home country of Japan, the series originally aired on Sunday Mornings at 8:00AM JST on TV Asahi and other ANN affiliates from January 30, 2000, and concluded on January 21, 2001, with 49 episodes. During the near end of the show's original broadcast, the series started being released on VHS (both for sale and rental) and DVD by Toei Video from December 8, 2000, to November 21, 2001, months after the series conclusion. 12 volumes have been released total, with each volume holding four episodes, with Volume 8 holding five episodes. Rental releases originally began on October 13, 2000, and the jacket designs for the sale and rental versions are different. Due to the DVD rentals starting earlier than the later Kamen Rider releases, there was no extras for each volume. Interviews were only included on the sale version of the DVD release. Other monster introductions and trailers were included in the New Year Special and the final volume. Episode 1 was included as an extra in the "Shotaro Ishinomori 70th Birthday DVD Box" released on July 21, 2008, and in the first edition of the first volume of the Kamen Rider Decade DVD. A Blu-ray Box set was released in 3 volumes between January 6 and May 11, 2016. In addition to the ancient language translation of the TV series, BOX 1 contains the DC version of episodes 1 and 2, BOX 2 contains Kamen Rider Kuuga's Super Secret Video "Kamen Rider Kuuga VS. the Powerful Monster Go-Jino-Da," and BOX 3 contains the New Year's special.
- In Southeast Asia, an English dub has been made under the name Masked Rider Kuuga and aired and released on home video in 2001, with all 49 episodes being covered. The English dub was produced in Hong Kong by Omni Productions. The English episodes were written by Colin Shevloff, who was also the English voice of Yusuke Godai. It was distributed in Malaysia by Speedy Video.
- In Indonesia, the series received an Indonesian dub and it aired on RCTI in 2001.
- In Malaysia, the series received a Malay dub and aired on TV3.
- In Saudi Arabia, the series aired on Spacetoon with an Arabic dub.
- In the Latin Spanish-speaking world, two Latin-Spanish dubs have been produced. The first Latin Spanish dub was produced by Cloverway (Which was Toei's international branch and it was their final project) with dubbing work by Venezuela studio, Etcétera Group. In Chile, it aired from November 3, 2007, to June 15, 2008, on ETC. In Mexico, it aired on Azteca 7 on January 8, 2008. Only 25 out of 49 episodes of this dub were covered and went unfinished because Cloverway was closed permanently by Toei Animation Inc. Then in 2021, Toei commissioned a new Latin-Spanish dub that was produced by Olympusat with dubbing work by Mexican studio, Meliorem. This was dubbed remotely online during the COVID-19 pandemic. It aired on Ultra Familia in the United States. On September 7, 2021, the series was distributed across all of Latin America on the FreeTV digital streaming service. Unlike the first dub, this new dub covers all 49 episodes.
- In North America, Shout! Studios acquired the license to release the entire series on Blu-ray. It became available on September 20, 2022, in its original Japanese audio with English subtitles spreading across seven discs. Subtitle options even include the option to have Gurongi given English subtitles or not. Previously, the show was only made available via streaming since 2020.
