= Mie Nanamori =

Japanese actress (born 1972)

- 七森 美江
- Born: October 16, 1972 (age 53); Tokyo, Japan
- Occupations: Actress, tarento
- Years active: 1997–2008
- Agents: Sadeeca; Cross Point
- Height: 1.68 m (5 ft 6 in) (2003)

Mie Nanamori (七森 美江, Nanamori Mie; born 16 October 1972) is a Japanese former actress and tarento. She was represented with Sadeeca.

== Biography ==
Nanamori was born in 1972 (Note: As a race queen her year of birth was 1974, other profiles said it was 1975.) in Tokyo.

She made her debut after she became a race queen for the '97 Suntory Nama Beer Campaign Girl and Kamome Service. Nanamori appeared in Shutsudō! Minisuka Police as the second and third generation Minisuka Police in January 1997, and later on October she became a "Won Girl" in the Tokyo Broadcasting System series Wonderful. She appeared in the series until March of the following year.

Nanamori worked as an actress in television dramas and advertisements and played Rose Monster Ru-Baruba-De in Kamen Rider Kuuga in 2000 and Lisa Teagle (Deka Bright) in Tokusou Sentai Dekaranger in 2004, whom she played as a cool woman. She was belonged to the talent agency Sadeeca until 2003 and she is later retired from her career. Nanamori is now married and has a child.

== Filmography ==
=== TV series ===
Year	Title	Role	Network	Notes
1997	Shutsudō! Minisuka Police		TV Tokyo	
1997	Wonderful		TBS	
1998	Doyō Special: Aji to Zekkei! Mizube no Yado		TV Tokyo	
1998	Doyō Special: Nippon Rettō Jūdan! Oshōgatsu Ikitai Onsen Yado		TV Tokyo	
1998	Shin Nihonjin no Shitsumon		NHK TV	
1998	Puchi Madam no Puchi Vacance		TV Asahi	
1998	Nacchan no Ie		TV Asahi	Episode 10
1999	Omizu no Hanamichi		Fuji TV	Episodes 9 and 10
1999	Suzuran		NHK TV	
1999	Cheap Love		TBS	Episode 5
2000	Kamen Rider Kuuga	Rose-Tattooed Woman / Rose Monster Ra-Baruba-De	TV Asahi	
2001	Shisen Man-po no Otoko		NHK TV	
2001	Misa Yamamura Suspense: Kyoto Kaiki Densetsu Satsujin Jiken		Fuji TV	
2001	Bengoshi Koresuke Asahidake		NTV	
2002	Egao ga Ichiban		TBS	
2002	serchin'for my polestar	Ayumi Kosaka	KTV	Episodes 9, 11, and Final Episode
2002	Torisetsu		TV Asahi	
2003	Torisetsu NTT Communications			Infomercial
2004	Tokusou Sentai Dekaranger	Lisa Teagle / Deka Bright	TV Asahi	Episode 40
2004	Aibō	Shizuka Sakuragi	TV Asahi	Season 3 Episode 18
2004	Mystery Minzoku Gakusha: Itsuki Yakumo		TV Asahi	Episodes 3 and 4
2006	Sōsa Kenji Shigemichi Chikamatsu		TV Tokyo	
2008	Tama Minami-sho Tatakiage Keiji Heikitsu Chikamatsu		TV Tokyo	

=== Films, direct-to-video films ===
Year	Title	Role
1997	Sharan Q no enka no hanamichi	
1997	Eiji	
2001	Shura no Michi	Mitsue Fueda

=== Advertisements ===
Year	Title	Notes
1997	Suntory Nama Beer	Campaign girl
1997	Suntory Beer "Bitters"	
1998	Suntory "Cocktail Bar"	
1999	JA Bank	
1999	Suntory "Super Chu-hi"	Infomercial
1999	Nissin Foods "Raō"	
1999	Kao Corporation Bab "Sō Haitte Mo"	
2000	Myojo Foods 50-shūnenkinen Campaign "Pearl Necklace Present"	
2000	Sankyō "Regain Bus"	
2000	Calpis Ajinomoto Danone "Danone Fruits Selection Ichiba"	
2001	Calpis Ajinomoto Danone	
2001	Kao "Range Quick Le"	
2001	Toshiba "Kigyō"	
2001	Kokusai Shōken "Kigyō"	
2003	Panasonic Air Con "Kirei"	
2003	McDonald's "Monochrome Hamburger"	
2006	Bristol Myers Lyon "Bufferin Plus Osōji" and "Bufferin Sentakki"	
2006	Tokyo Star Bank "Star One Jūtaku Loan"	
2006	Fuji Heavy Industries Subaru Legacy Outback "Futari no Ashiato"	
2007	Mitsui no Reform "Yume ni Awa Sete"	

=== Video games ===
Year	Title	Role
1998	Efikasu Kono Omoi o Kimi ni	Megumi Fukami
2000	Kamen Rider Kuuga	Rose-Tattooed Woman / Ru-Baruba-De

=== Advertising stills ===
Year	Title
1998	Tokyo Kyoku Osame Ren: Kōza Furikae-kan Shō poster
2000	Calpis Ajinomoto Danone
2002	Kokusaishōken

=== Stage ===
Year	Title
2003	Burai

=== Radio ===
Year	Title	Network	Ref.
2015	Shigeki Takatera no Kaiju Radio	Chofu FM	

=== Broadband ===
Title	Network
Nama de Ikimashou!	A! To Odoroku Hōsōkyoku Nama-sei Channel

== Bibliography ==
=== Photobooks ===
Year	Title
1997	Colors
1998	emotion

=== Magazines ===
Year	Title	Notes
1999	Stella	4 Jun issue
