= An Egyptian Eunuque =

Painting by Théodore Jacques Ralli

- L'Eunuque (French)
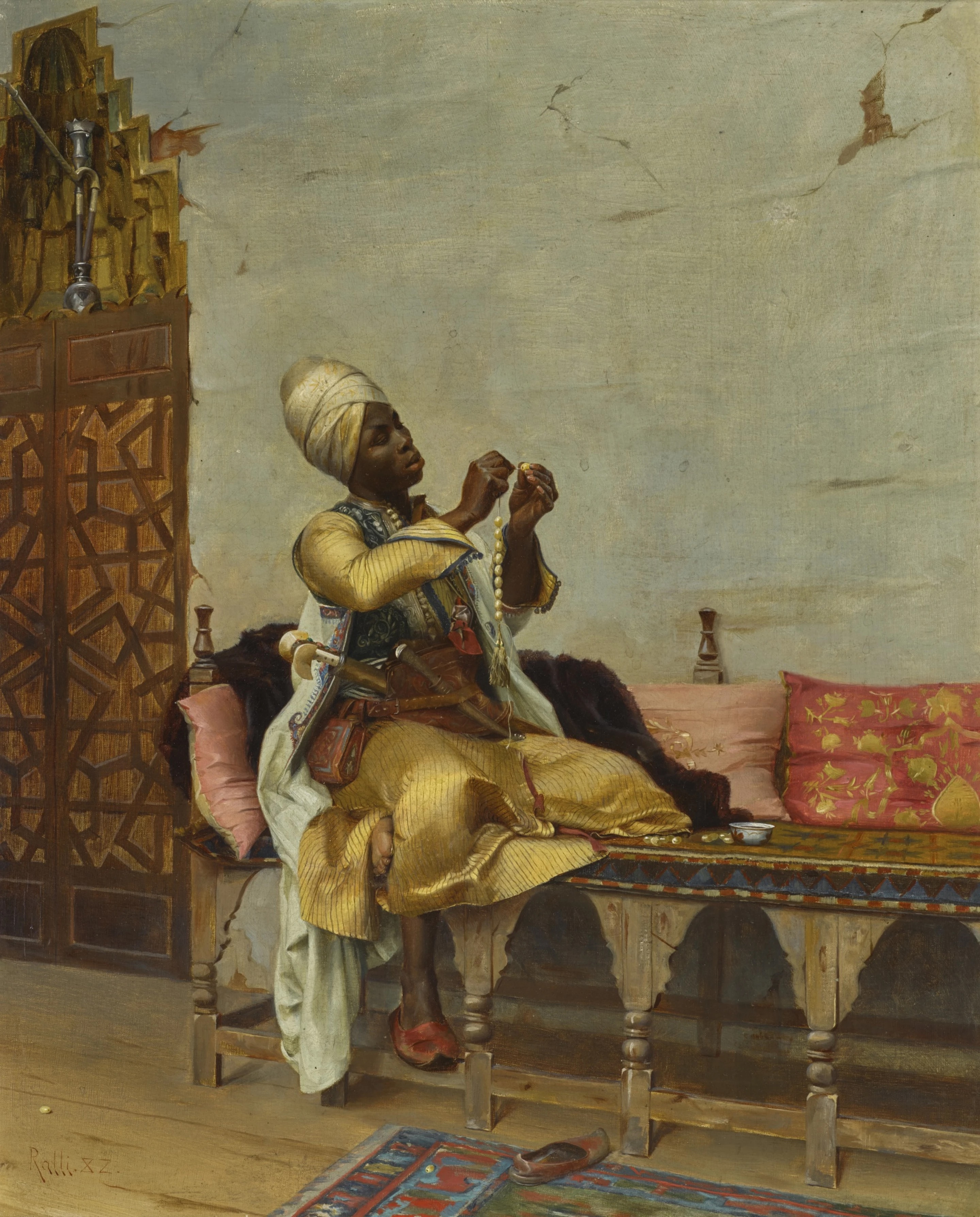
- An Egyptian Eunuque
- Artist: Théodore Jacques Ralli
- Year: c. 1882
- Medium: Oil on canvas
- Movement: French School; Orientalism
- Subject: An Egyptian Eunuque Stringing Pearls
- Dimensions: 47 cm × 38 cm (18.5 in × 14.9 in)
- Owner: Private Collector

An Egyptian Eunuque is an oil painting created by Greek-French painter Théodore Jacques Ralli. Ralli was born in Constantinople and was a member of the prominent family known as the Ralli family. From a young age, the painter was interested in art. He was exposed to orientalist themes in Constantinople such as orientalist clothing, carpets, coffee shops, bazaars, harems, and daily life in the Ottoman Empire. In the early 1870s, the painter showed an interest in oriental art and studied under orientalist painter Jean-Léon Gérôme at his studio workshop in the Beaux-Arts de Paris in 1873. Nasli Playing the Guitar completed in 1877, was one of the painter's earliest orientalist works. Young Ottoman Woman and Veiled Woman in Yellow were orientalist works completed in the early 1880s featuring the yashmak. Marionettes in the Harem was completed in 1881 and featured young women playing in a harem guarded by a eunuch. During this period, Ralli's studio was located at 30 Rue Bremontier in Paris, France, and the painter frequently participated in exhibitions known as the Paris Salon and the Liverpool Autumn Exhibition. He also traveled to Cairo, Egypt, by 1880, and eventually spent his winters in Cairo from 1890 to 1904.

A eunuch is a boy or man who has been castrated; they were typically slaves who served the Ottoman harem. Orientalist painters chose the subject matter; consequently, Orientalist artwork during that era depicted the eroticism and exotic nature of the Ottoman Empire. Ralli and Gérôme both painted harems, odalisques, and eunuchs; some of the women were nude. Pool in a Harem by Gérôme, painted in 1876, clearly depicts the nature of this style of painting. Another notable work by Gérôme was The Grand White Eunuch, painted around the same period as this work, between 1880 and 1883. Jean Discart also painted The Harem Guard in 1900. Some of Ralli's work featured recurring subjects; the main character in An Egyptian Eunuch is part of a narrative called Marionettes in the Harem where he is featured as a eunuch guarding the harem, while a young woman plays with her marionettes. The chest also recurs in Ralli's other works and can be seen in the The Captive. An Egyptian Eunuque last sold at a Sotheby' auction on April 24, 2018, for over 273,000 GBP in London. The work is currently held in a private collection.

== History ==
By the 1880s, Rallis was a well-known Orientalist painter and the protege of Jean-Léon Gérôme. Ralli's artwork was frequently exhibited at prestigious art exhibitions across the world. An Egyptian Eunuque was exhibited at the Paris Salon of 1882, no. 2237 (as L'Eunuque), and the same year, Ralli's orientalist work known as the Boa Charmer in a Harem at Cairo was exhibited in England at the Twelfth Annual Liverpool Autumn Exhibition of Modern Pictures at the Walker Art Gallery on William Brown Street. An Egyptian Eunuque, was also exhibited at the Royal Manchester Institution, 1882, no. 24 (as An Egyptian Eunuque) in Manchester, England. In 1889, Rallis represented Greece at the Paris World Fair known as the Exposition Universelle (1889) along with 16 other Greek artists and was awarded the silver medal. He presented several of his works, including An Egyptian Eunuque and Refectory in a Greek Monastery. The artist was living in Cairo, Egypt, by 1891 and was well acquainted with the Khedivate of Egypt's Tewfik Pasha, who lived until 1892. Ralli was also well acquainted with his son Abbas Pasha, who replaced him at the age of 19. Ralli chaired the Organizing Committee that established the country's first painting exhibition, modeled after the Parisian Salons. Ralli participated with An Egyptian Eunuque, fourteen other works, one pastel, and 16 drawings in 1891. The press of the time was impressed with An Egyptian Eunuque. Not much is known about the history of the painting until it resurfaced in a private collection in Athens, Greece, in the 2010s. It was sold at a Sotheby's Orientalist auction on April 24, 2018, in London, United Kingdom, for 273,000 GBP.

== Description ==
The oil on canvas painting was created in 1882. By now, Jean-Léon Gérôme's protege was a more experienced painter, having completed several Orientalist works. The work features a height of 47 cm (18.5 in) and a width of 38 cm (14.9 in). The young eunuch stringing pearls is dressed in lavish Ottoman attire, demonstrating the fashionable opulence of a lost era. The figure resembles a harem guard with a yataghan sword from Ralli's Marionettes in the Harem. The subject is also wearing traditional Ottoman babouche (balgha) shoes and a turban. The bench, hookah, mihrab, and lavish carpets Orientalize the scene. During an era when artistic experimentation such as Impressionism was becoming popular, Ralli chose to paint hybrid works, but the figure in An Egyptian Eunuque strictly adheres to traditional academic painting, featuring a smooth, refined surface where the brushwork is invisible and creates a smooth, glass-like finish known as fini, meaning finished, following idealism. Some elements in the work feature loose brushwork, such as the floor, mihrab, and parts of the bench. The work was signed and dated Ralli 82 in the lower left.

== Gallery ==
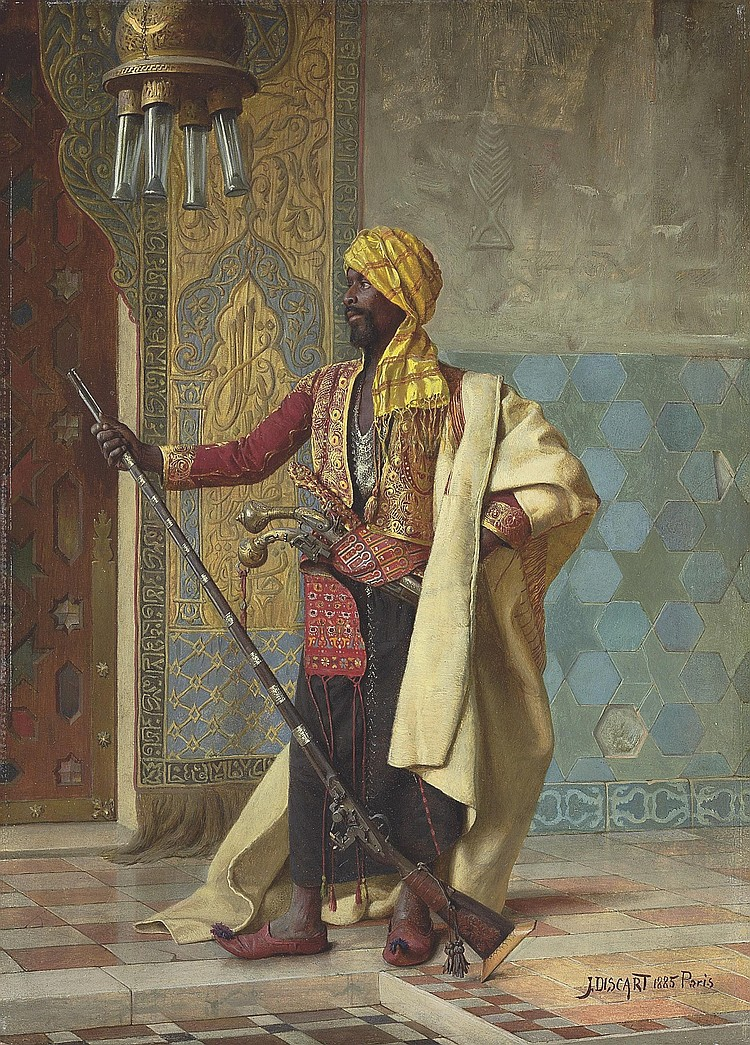
The Harem Guard by Jean Discart c.1900

The Grand White Eunuch by Jean-Léon Gérôme c.1880

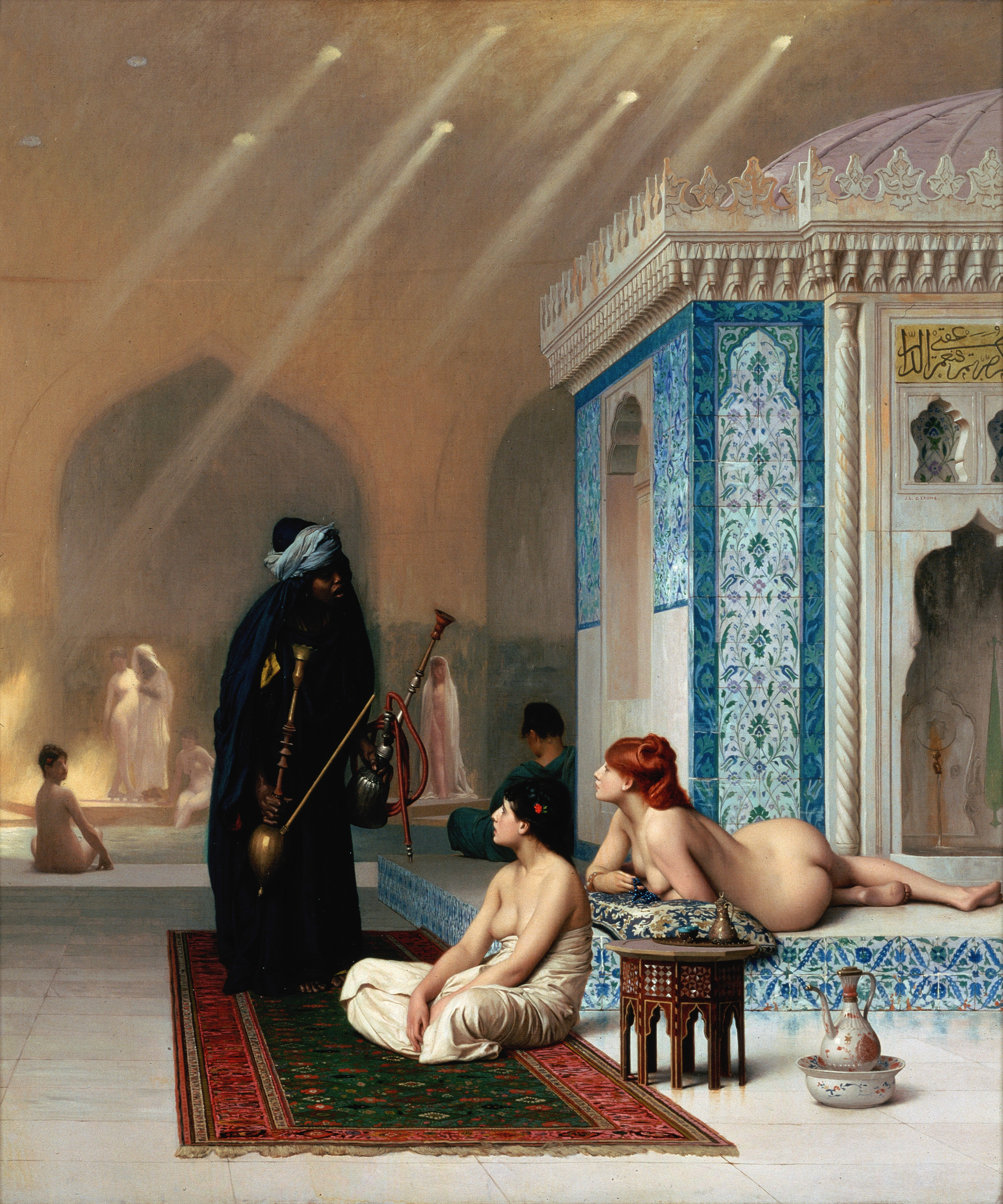
Pool in a Harem by Jean-Léon Gérôme c.1876

=== Other Similar Works ===
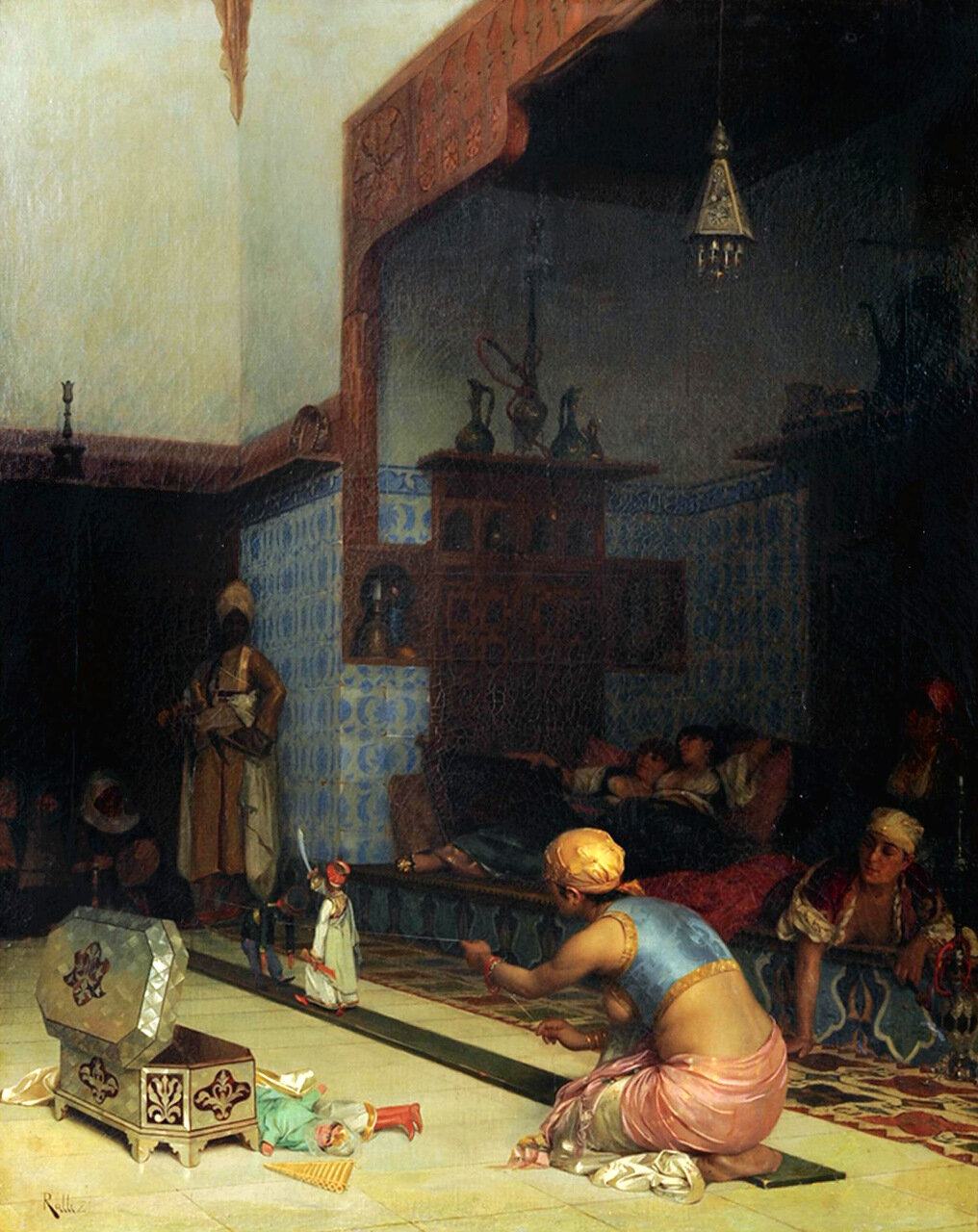
Marionettes in the Harem c. 1881

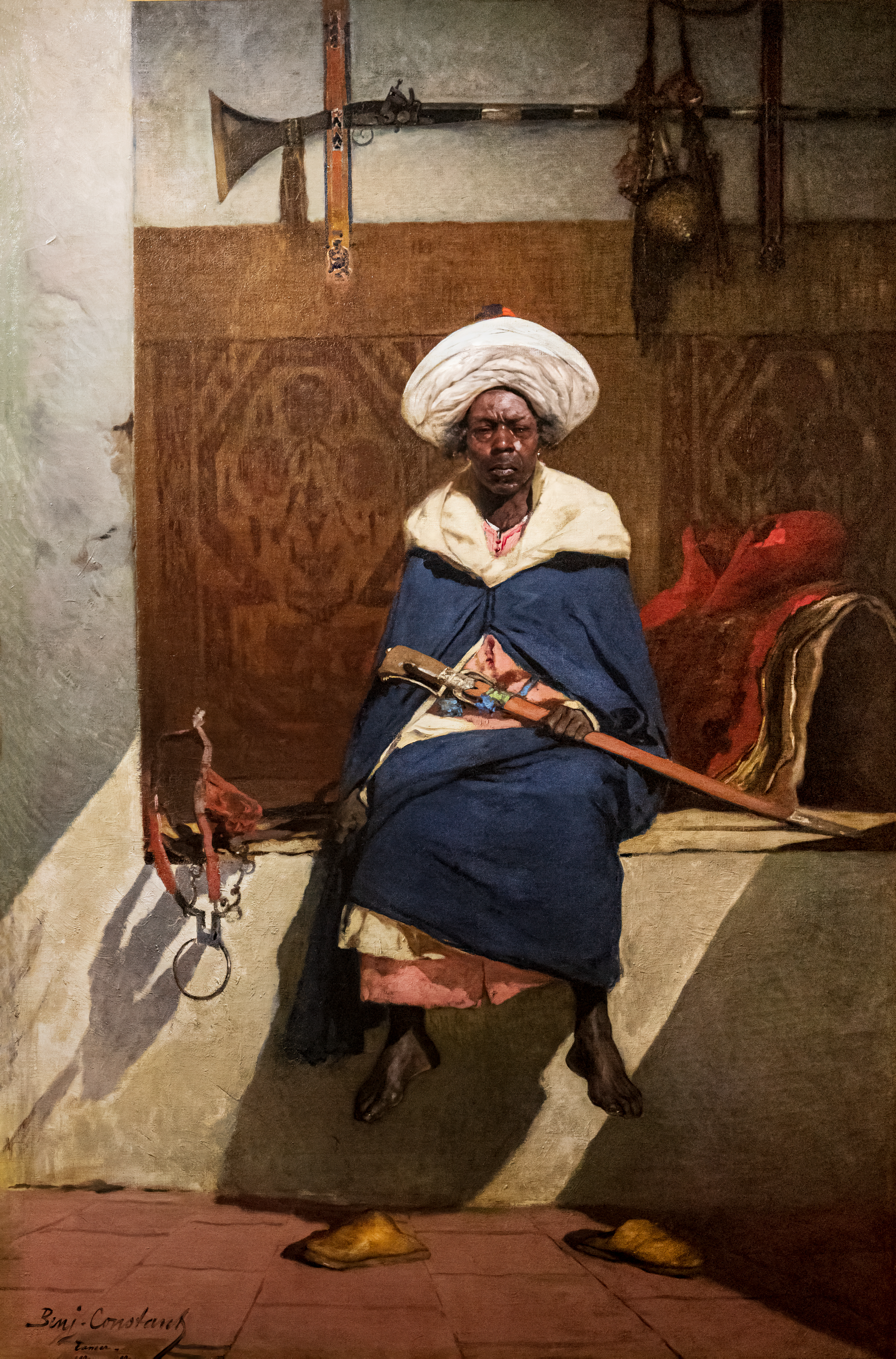
The Moroccan Kingpin Tahamy, by Jean-Joseph Benjamin-Constant c. 1880

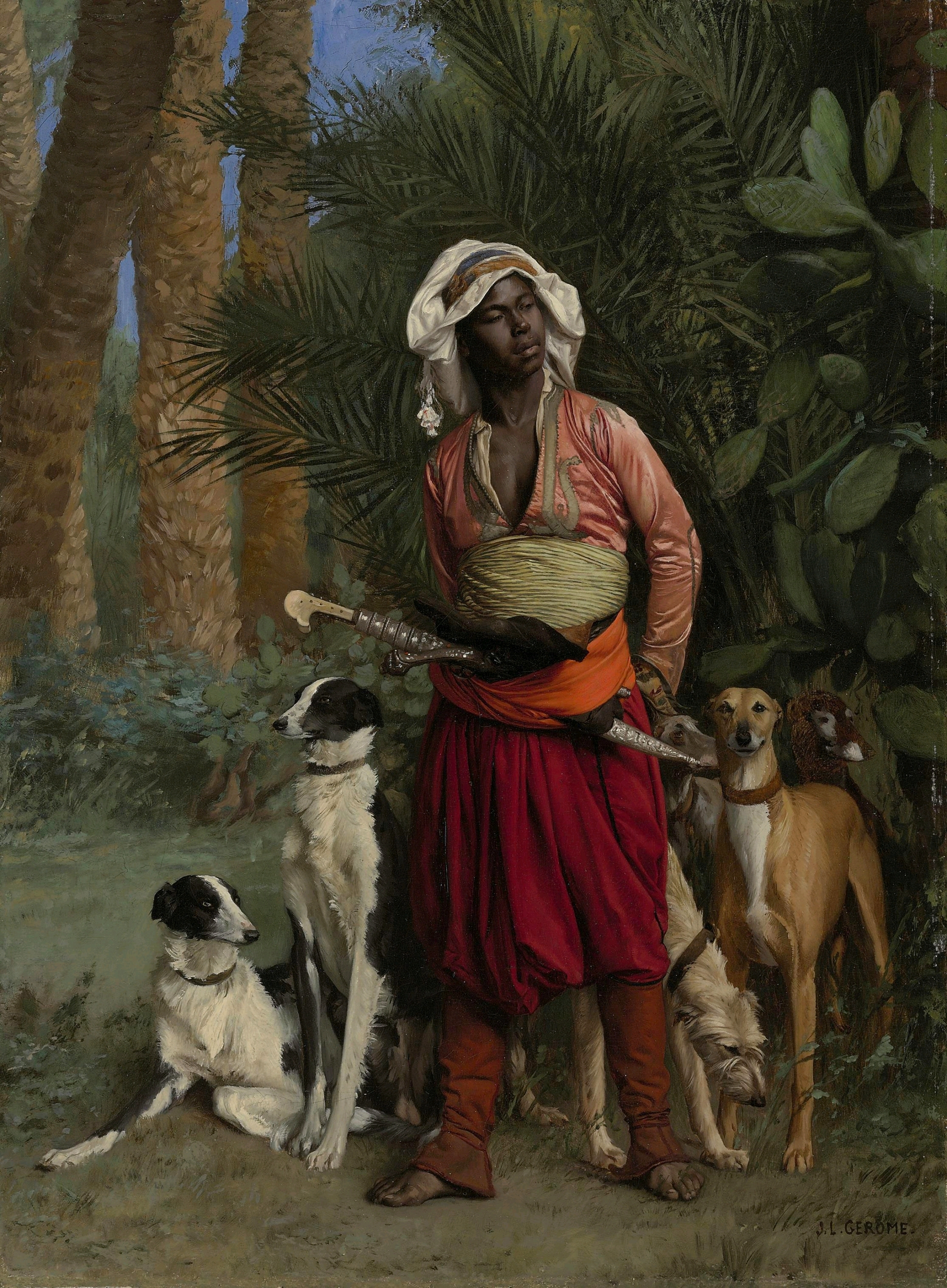
Master of the Hounds by Jean-Léon Gérôme c. 1871

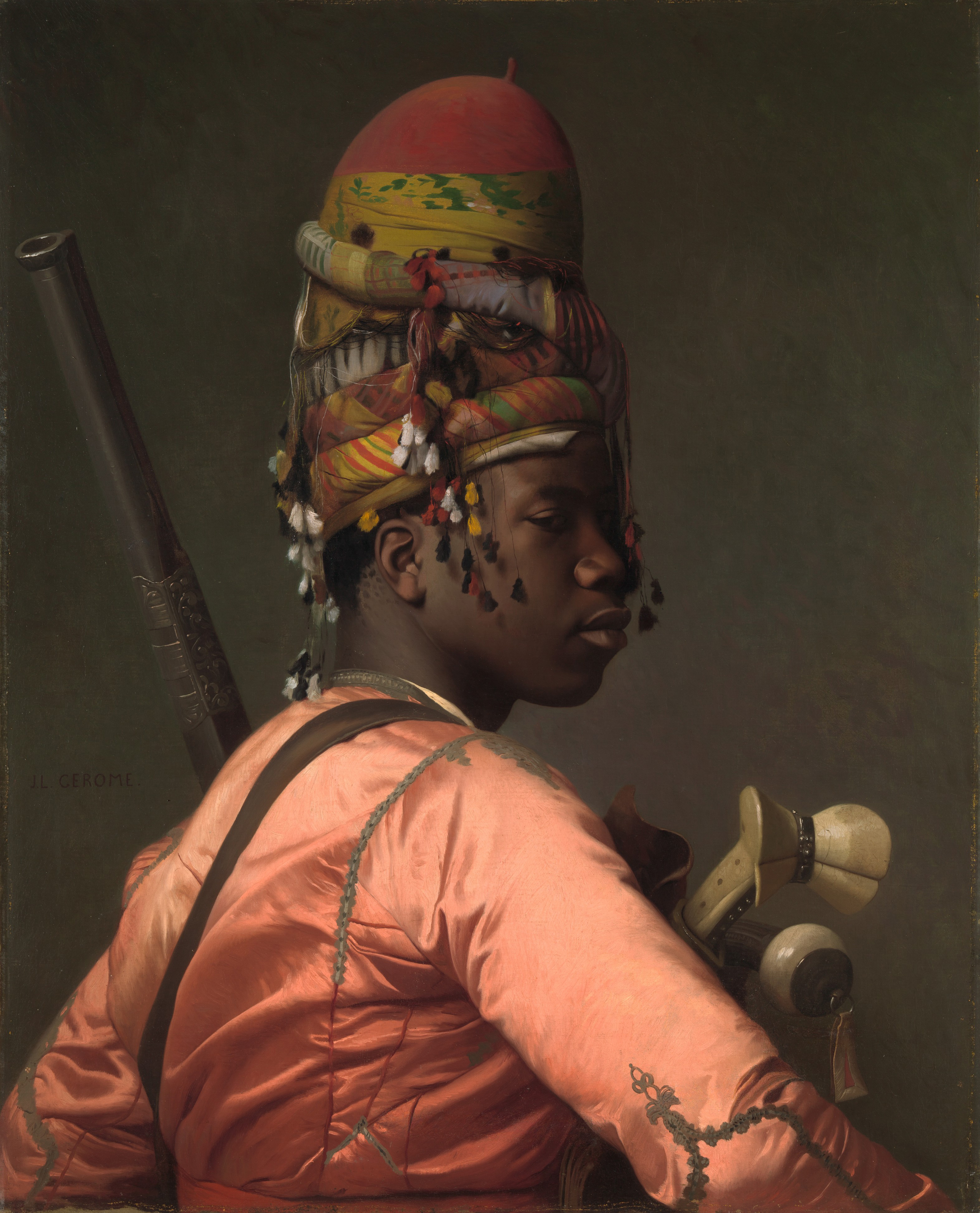
Bashi Bazouk by Jean-Léon Gérôme c. 1869

== Bibliography ==
- Palioura, Maria Mirka (2008). Το ζωγραφικό έργο του Θεόδωρου Ράλλη (1852-1909): πηγές έμπνευσης - οριενταλιστικά θέματα [The Work of the Painter Theodoros Rallis (1852–1909): Sources of Inspiration - Orientalist Themes] (Thesis) (in Greek). Athens, Greece: University of Athens. doi:10.12681/eadd/22456.
- Katsanaki, Maria (2007). Le peintre Théodore Ralli (1852-1909) et son oeuvre [The Painter Théodore Ralli (1852–1909) and his Work] (Thesis) (in French). Paris, France: Université Panthéon-Sorbonne.
- Greenwood, William; De Guise, Lucien (2019). Inspired by the East How the Islamic World Influenced Western Art. London, United Kingdom: British Museum Press. ISBN 9780714111933.
- Hathaway, Jane (2019). The Chief Eunuch of the Ottoman Harem From African Slave to Power-Broker. Cambridge, United Kingdom: Cambridge University Press. ISBN 9781107108295.
- Baschet, Ludovic (1882). Troisième Année L'Exposition des Beaux-Arts Salon De 1882 [Third Year: The Fine Arts Exhibition – Salon of 1882] (in French). Paris, France: Librairie d'art L. Baschet.
