= Young Ottoman Woman =

Painting by Théodore Jacques Ralli

- Jeune ottomane (French)
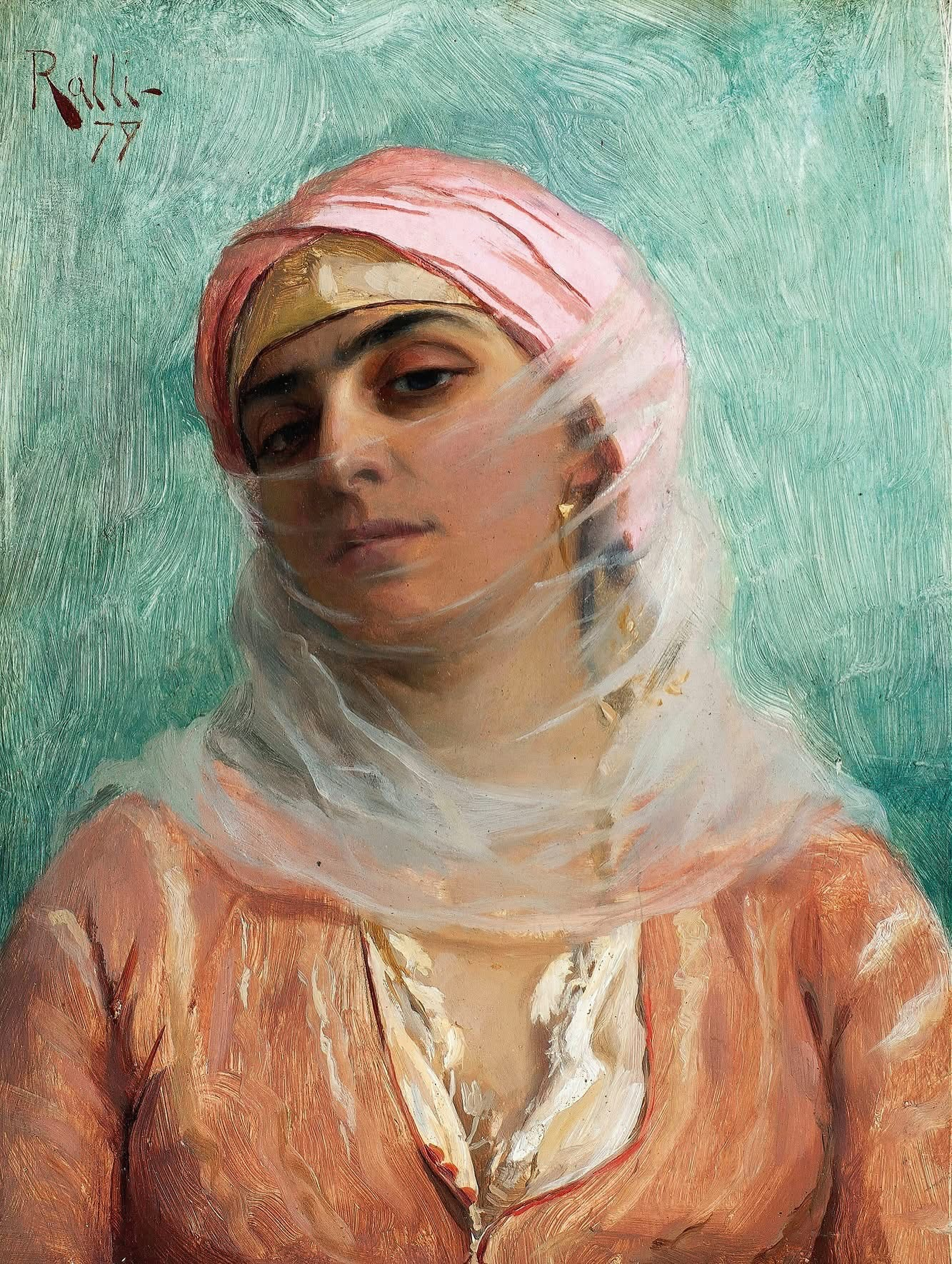
- Artist: Théodore Jacques Ralli
- Year: c. 1879
- Medium: Oil on canvas
- Movement: Impressionism; Orientalism
- Subject: Young Ottoman Woman in a Yashmak
- Dimensions: 17 cm × 13.5 cm (6.6 in × 5.3 in)
- Owner: Private Collector

Young Ottoman Woman was an orientalist impressionist painting created by Greek-French painter Théodore Jacques Ralli. Ralli was an Orientalist, Academic, and Impressionist painter who painted in both the Academic and Impressionist styles. Ralli's works were accepted at the prestigious Paris Salon as early as 1875. Impressionists and Realist painters were rejected by the Paris Salon and held their own exhibition in 1874, attracting only 3,500 visitors while the Paris Salon had 400,000 visitors that same year. Ralli exhibited works at the Paris Salon every year from 1875 to 1909, but also joined the rebellious impressionist art movement by 1878, painting Rastoni, and the following year he painted Young Ottoman Woman. Sadly, his impressionist works do not have an exhibition history, but they were signed and dated by the artist, who also used multiple signatures. The works he submitted to the Paris Salon were of Greek everyday life and Orientalist themes. Ralli was interested in the Impressionist movement, and it motivated him to complete a sizeable catalogue of Impressionist works. Unlike his teacher Gerome, who was loyal to Academic art, Ralli did not remain loyal to one painting style, and art historians have to exercise extreme caution when categorising the painter and his works.

Impressionists Pierre Auguste Renoir and Édouard Manet painted countless portraits of subjects resembling Ralli's works. Claude Monet and Camille Pissarro also painted some portraits, but not at the same volume as Renoir or Manet. Ralli created many orientalist impressionist works, blending his knowledge of Academic art with what he learned from the impressionists. Early on, the new style was unpopular, and Ralli submitted mostly academic works to the Paris Salon, leaving the painter relatively unknown for his contribution to Impressionism. Ralli painted numerous orientalist works featuring women in a facial garment known as the yashmak. His teacher Jean-Léon Gérôme painted a similar subject known as Woman from Constantinople in 1876 with precise, academic-style brushwork, leaving the painting glass-like. Ralli and his impressionist contemporaries used heavier brushwork indicative of the growing new style. The current painting was last sold in Paris, France, at a Christie's auction called Visions of the Orient: From Orientalism to Contemporary Art on November 4, 2011, to a private collector for 17,500 euros.

== Description ==
The work of art was created using oil on canvas in 1879. The height of the small work is 17 cm (6.6 in), and the width is 13.5 cm (5.3 in). Ralli intentionally used a painterly style for the turquoise background, the young woman's garments, and her yashmak, while using less visible brush strokes on her face. The woman wears a two-part yashmak, the face veil features transparent muslin popular in Egypt during the period, and the pink head veil covers her head. The small visible gold portion is called the hotoz, and the pink head portion is attached to it. The impressionist work is similar to a method used by Renoir and Manet in their portraits. The same model was used in Ralli's work The Captive painted 6 years later in 1885. The small painting was signed and dated in the upper left corner, Ralli 79.

== Gallery ==
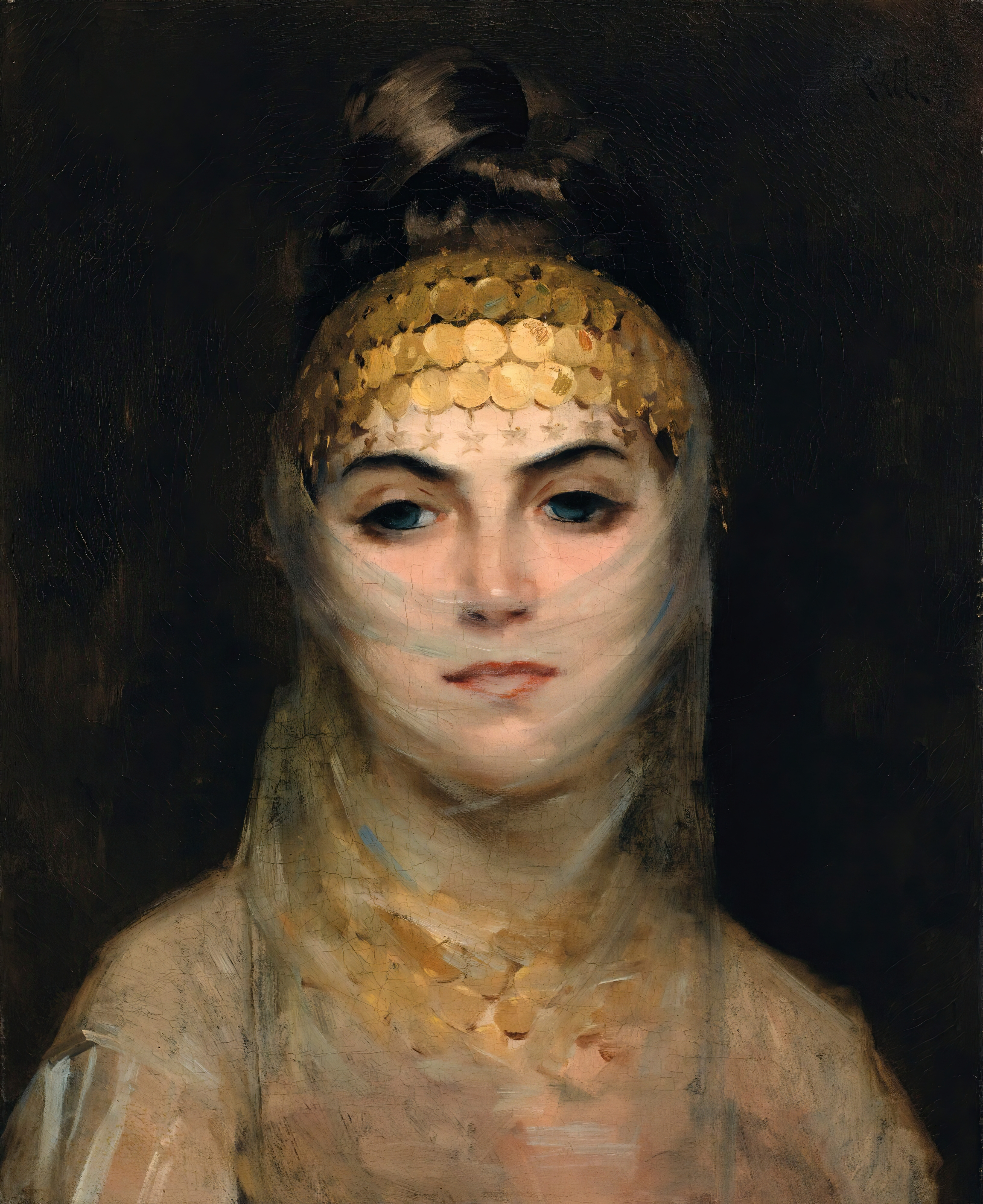
The Odalisque with Blue Eyes c. (1873 to 1909)

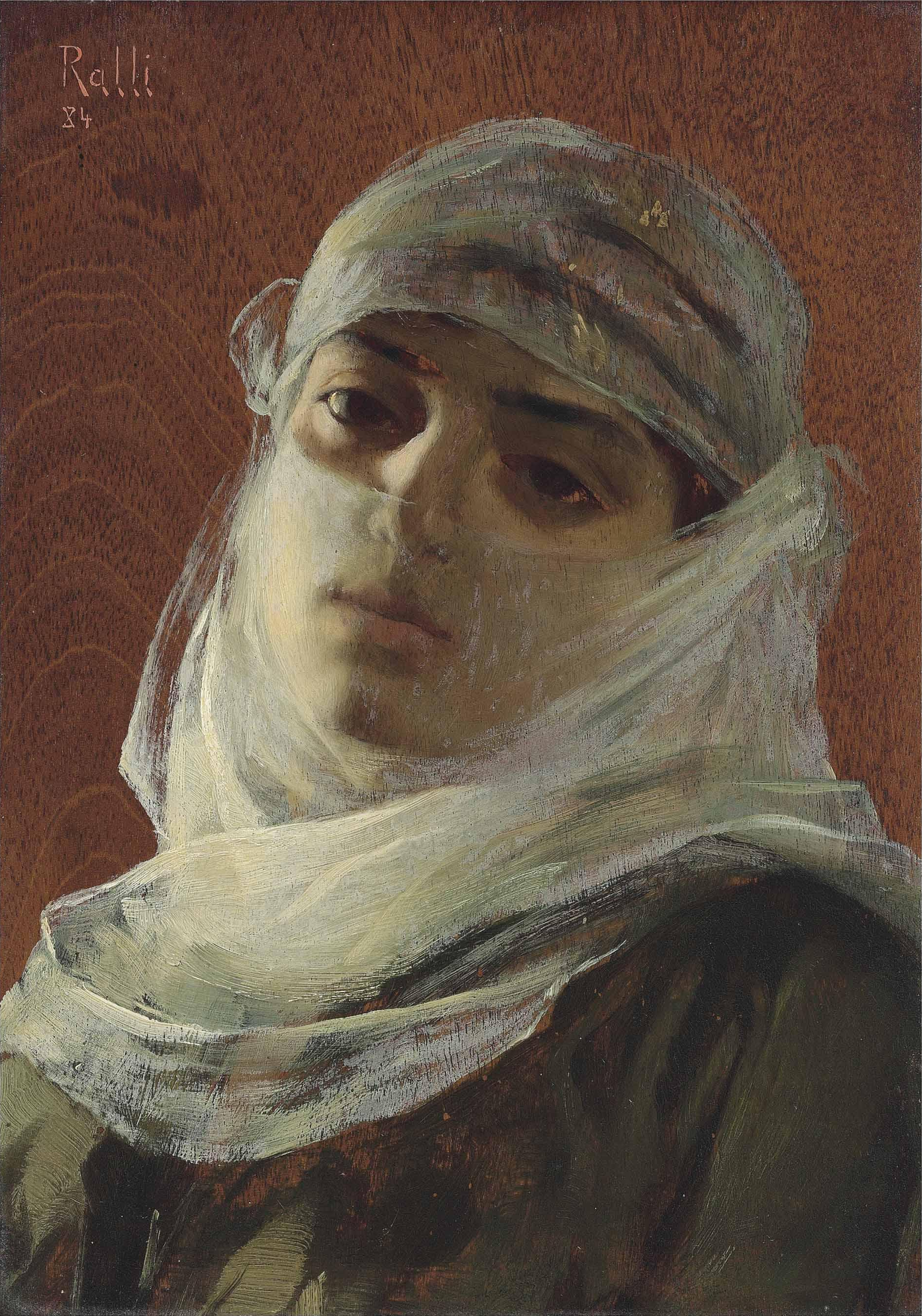
Innocent Odalisque, c. (1884)

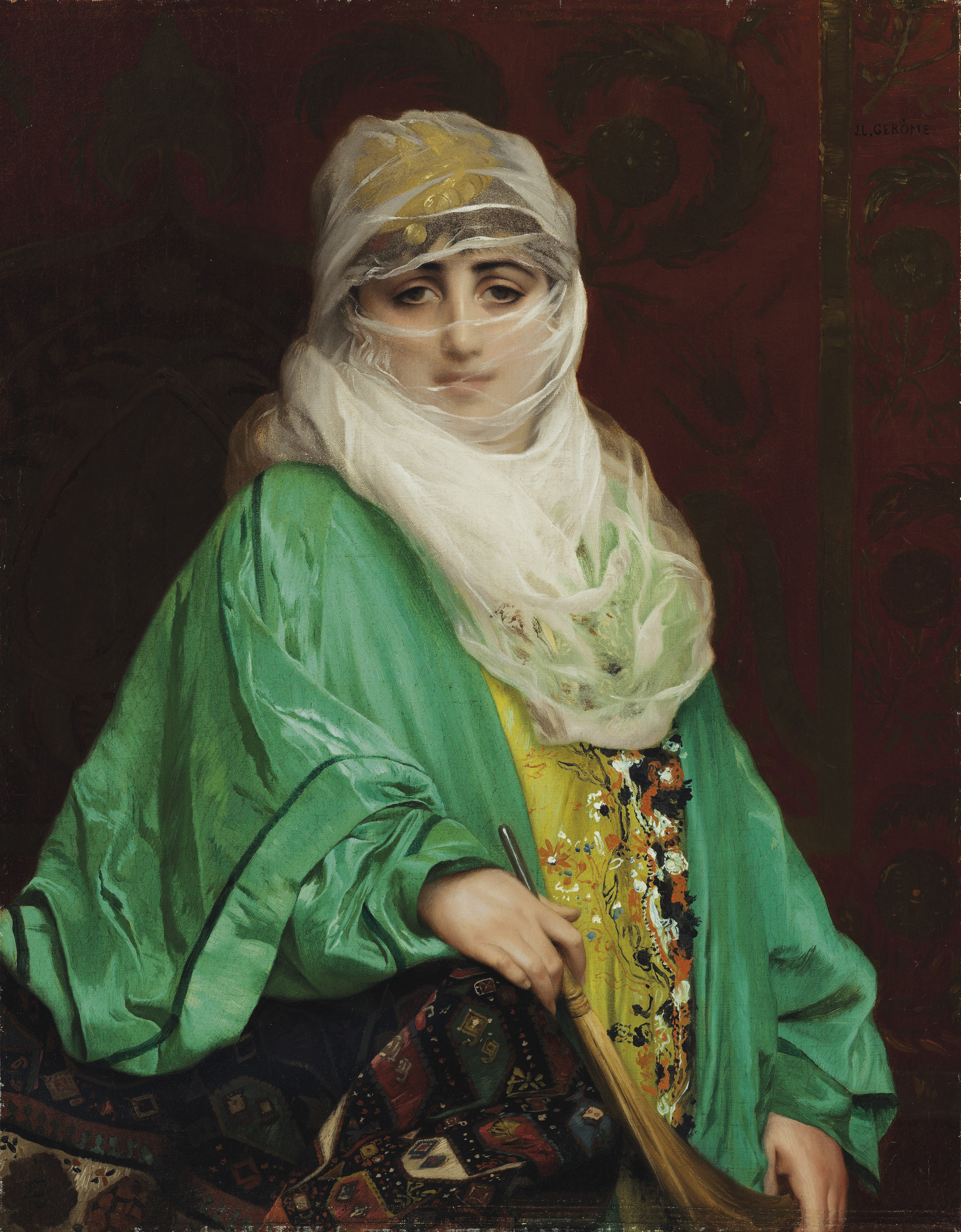
Woman from Constantinople, by Jean-Léon Gérôme c. (1876) note glass like invisble brushwork

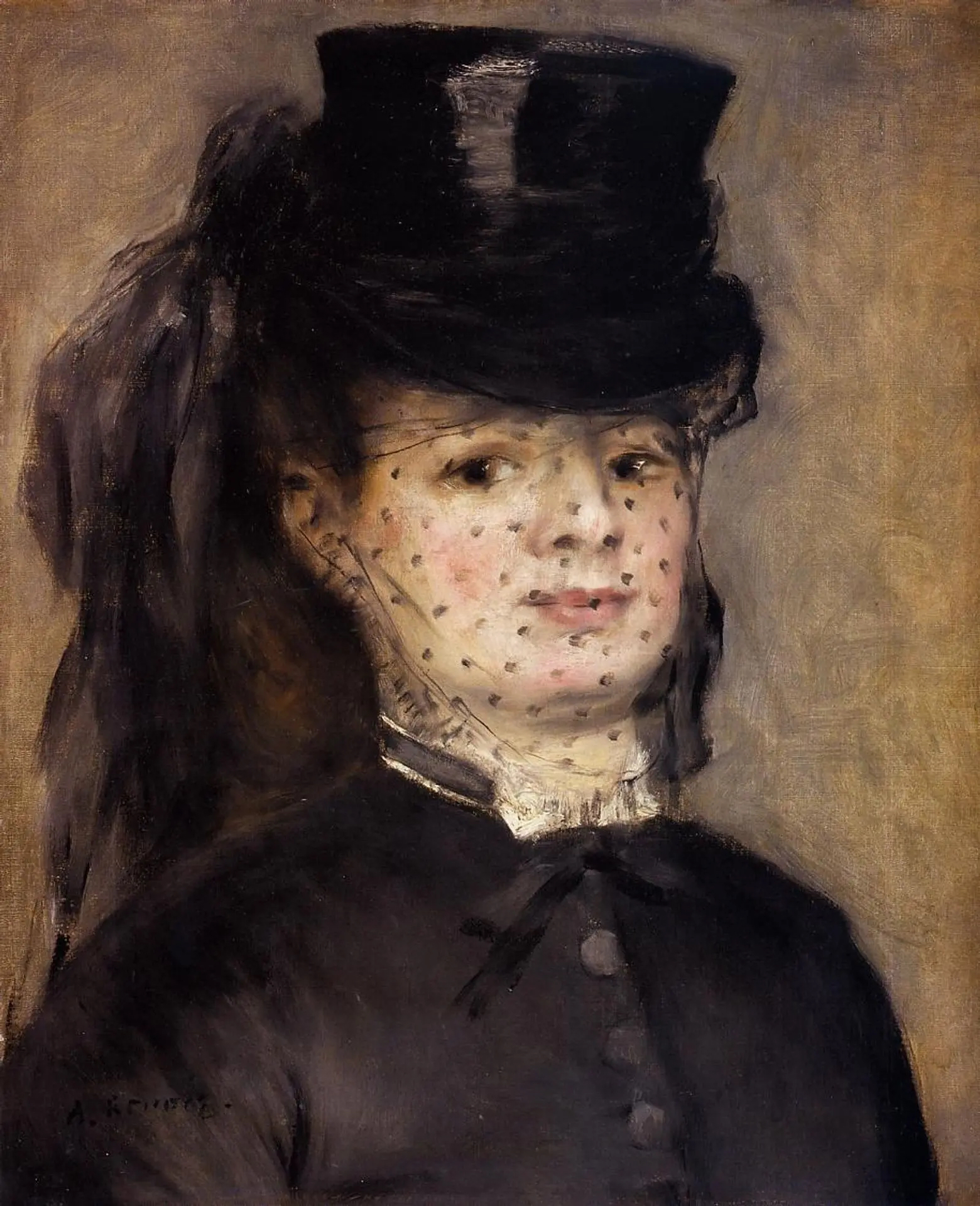
Portrait of Madame Darras wearing veil with chenille dots, by Pierre-Auguste Renoir c. (1868)

=== Similar Impressionist Works ===
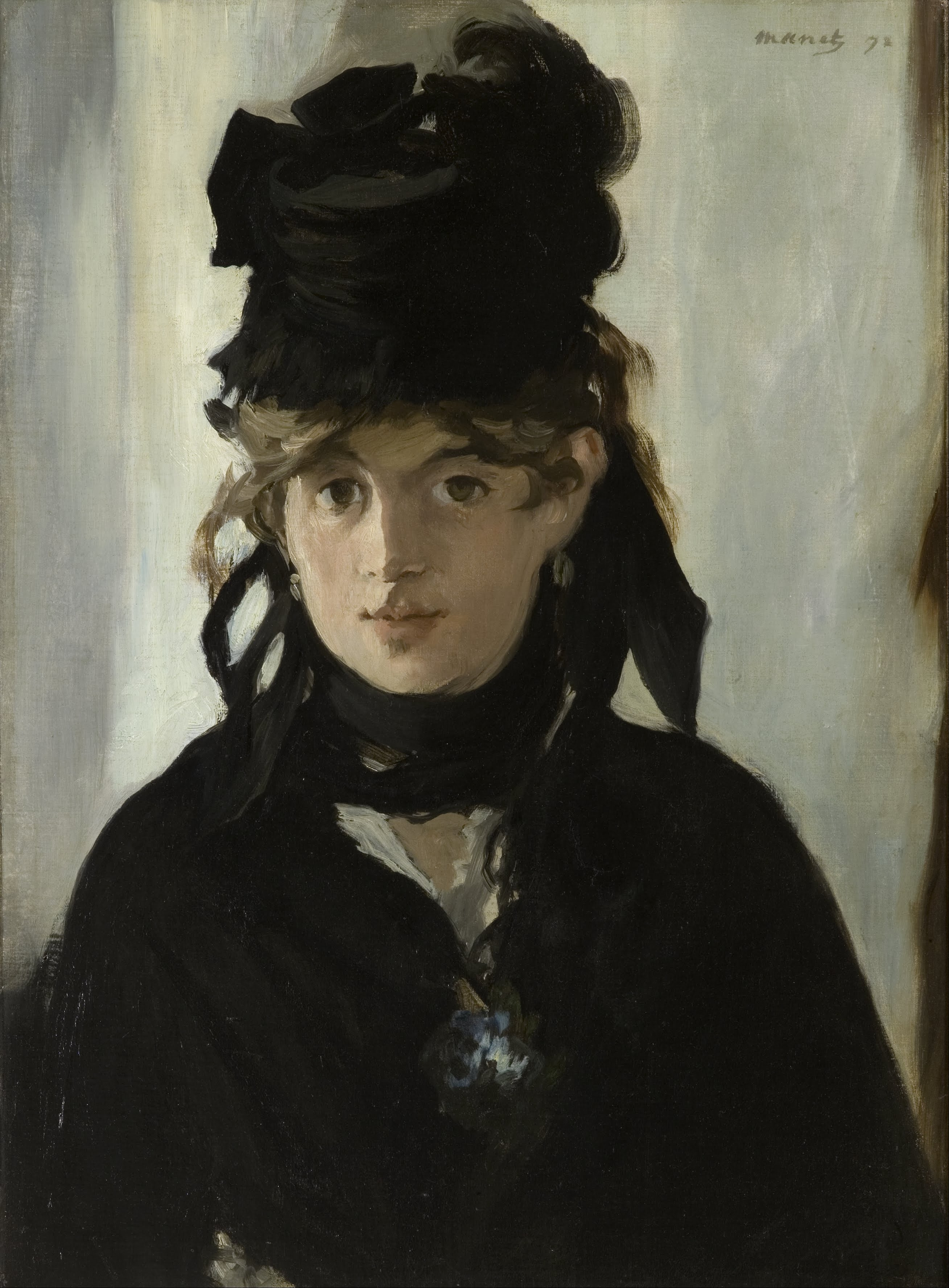
Berthe Morisot with a Bouquet of Violets by Édouard Manet c. 1872

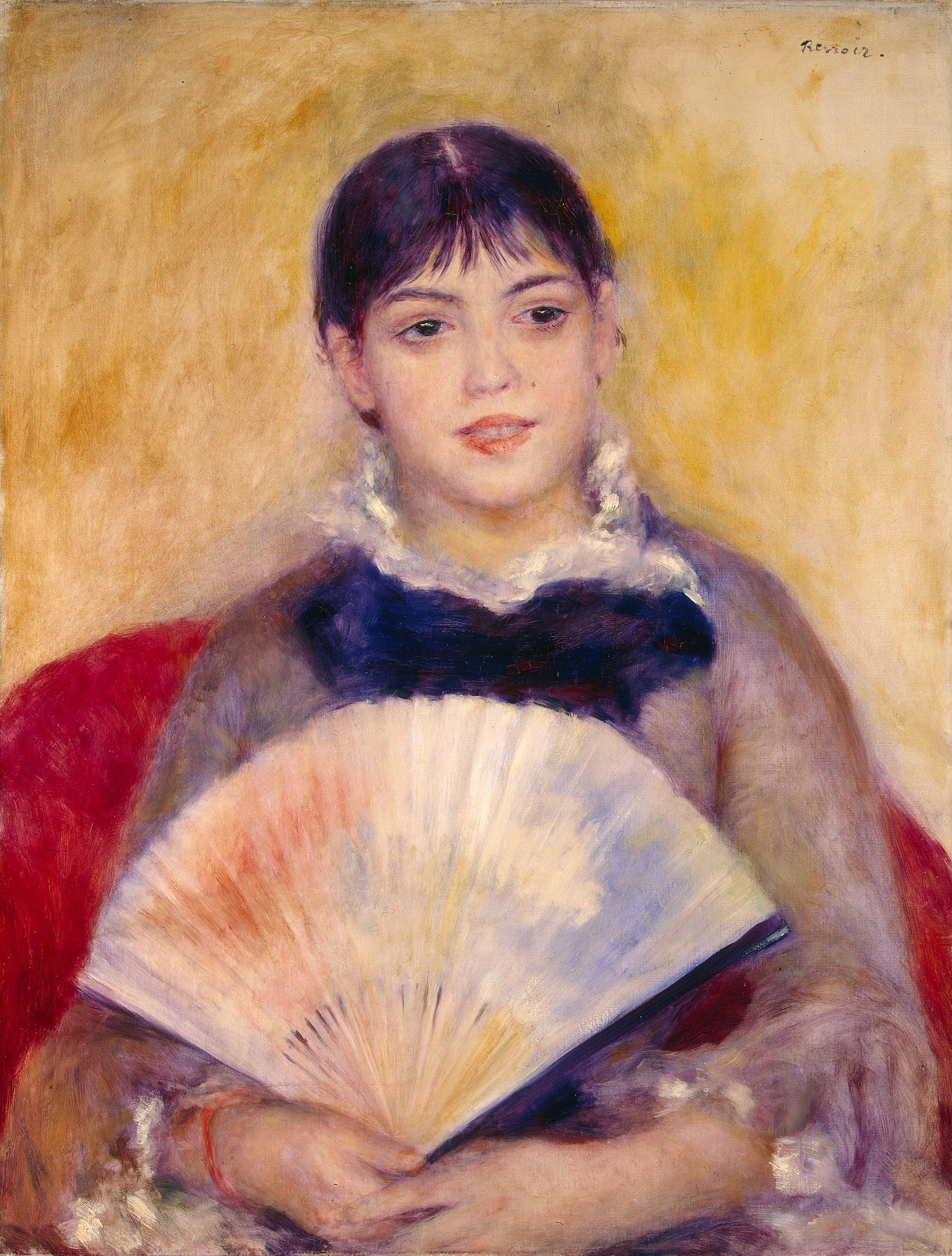
Girl with a Fan by Pierre-Auguste Renoir c. 1881

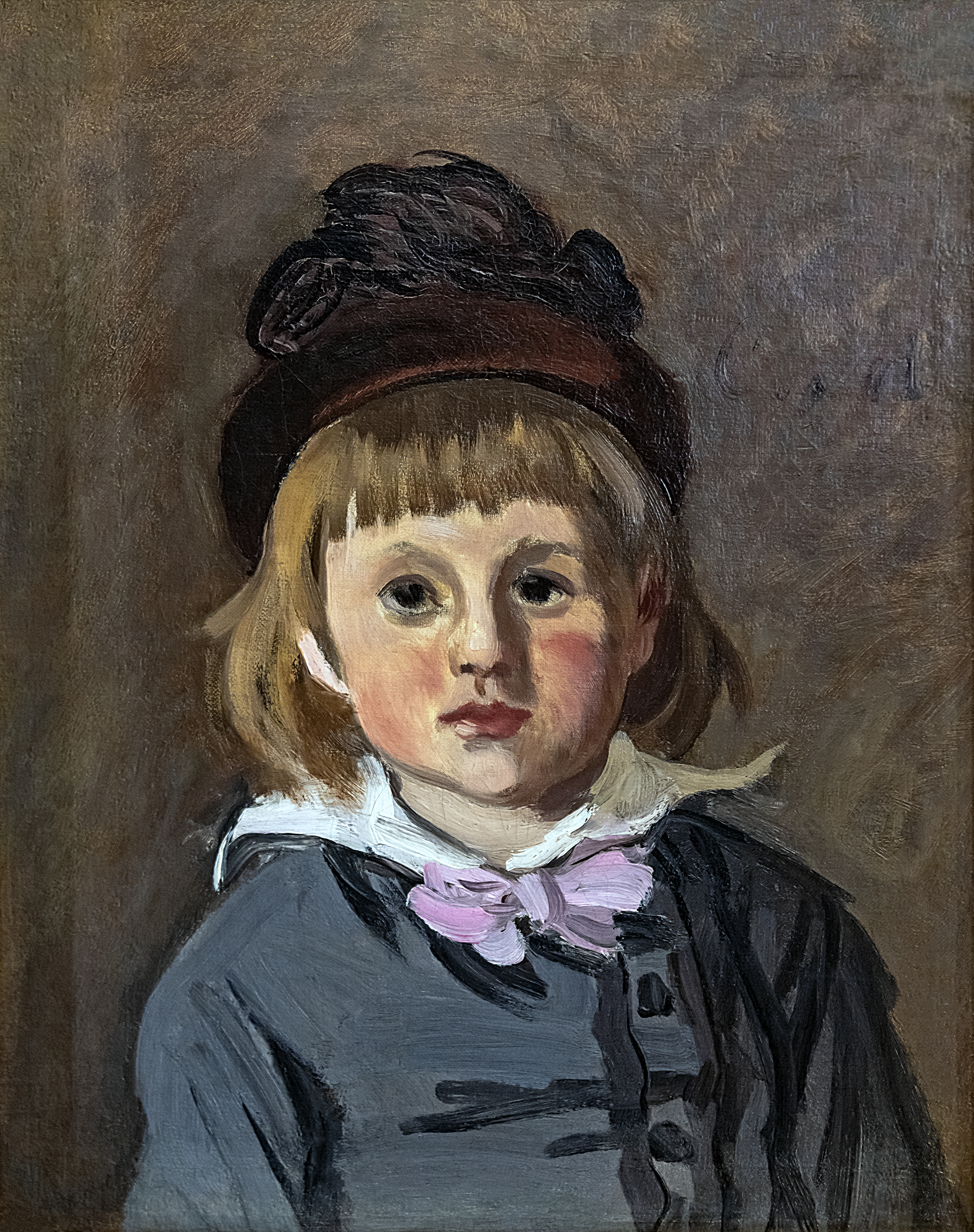
Portrait Jean Monet in a pompon bonnet. by Claude Monet c. 1869

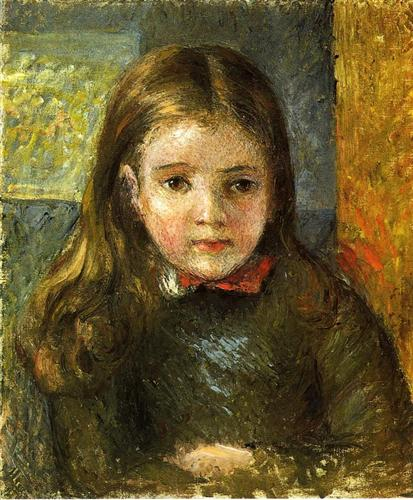
Portrait of Goerges Pissarro by Camille Pissarro c. 1878

== Bibliography ==
- Palioura, Maria Mirka (2008). Το ζωγραφικό έργο του Θεόδωρου Ράλλη (1852-1909): πηγές έμπνευσης - οριενταλιστικά θέματα [The Work of the Painter Theodoros Rallis (1852-1909): Sources of Inspiration - Orientalist Themes] (Thesis) (in Greek). Athens, Greece: University of Athens. doi:10.12681/eadd/22456.
- Palioura, Mirka Α. (December 14, 2014). "Theodoros Ralli Looking East" (PDF). Athens, Greece: Benaki Museum. Archived (PDF) from the original on September 11, 2025.
- Lamprake-Plaka, Marina; Agathonikou, Efi; Giannoudake, Tonia; Katsanaki, Maria (2013). Εθνική Πινακοθήκη Μουσείο Αλέξανδρου Σούτσου Τέσσερις Αιώνες Ελληνικής Τέχνης [National Gallery Alexandros Soutsos Museum Four Centuries of Greek Art] (PDF). Athens, Greece: National Gallery and Alexandros Soutzos Museum (Sponsored by the Stavros S. Niarchos Foundation) and Peak publishing.
- Palioura, Mirka (2016). "Signum Ετήσια Επιθεώρηση για τις Ανθρωπιστικές και Κοινωνικές Σπουδές" [Signum Annual Review for the Humanities and Social Studies (Orientalism: the polysemy of the term and its artistic approach through the work of Theodoros Rallis)] (PDF) (in Greek). Signum. Archived (PDF) from the original on March 14, 2026.
- Vogelsang-Eastwood, Gillian; Vogelsang, W. J. (2008). Covering the Moon: An Introduction to Middle Eastern Face Veils. Bristol, Connecticut: Peeters. ISBN 978-90-429-1990-7.
