= Boa Charmer in a Harem at Cairo =

Painting by Théodore Jacques Ralli

- Une charmeuse de boas dans un harem au Caire (French)
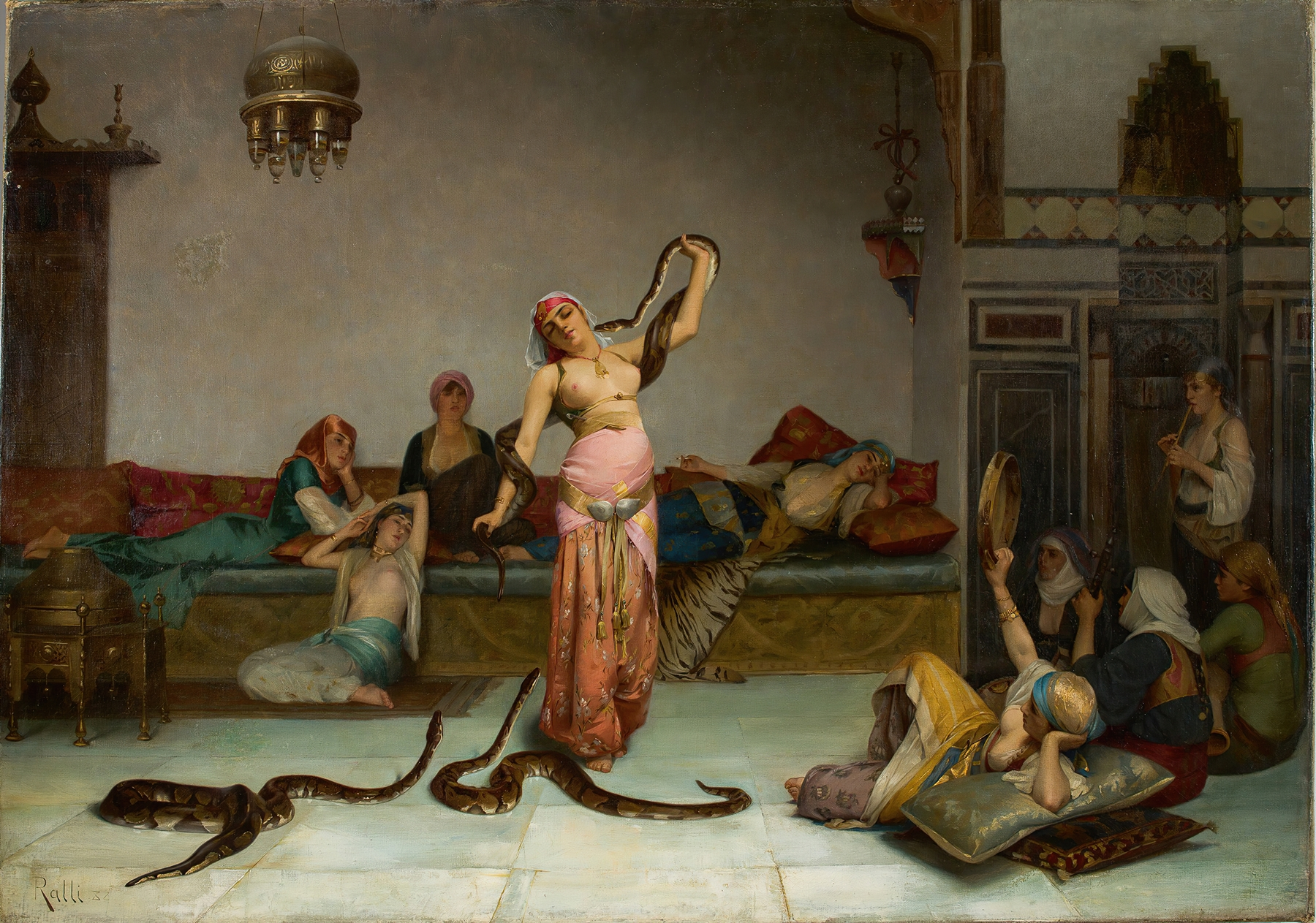
- Boa Charmer in a Harem at Cairo
- Artist: Théodore Jacques Ralli
- Year: c. 1882
- Medium: Oil on canvas
- Movement: French School; Orientalism
- Subject: Boa Charmer in a Harem at Cairo
- Dimensions: 65.5 cm × 92.5 cm (25.7 in × 36.4 in)
- Owner: Private Collector

Boa Charmer in a Harem at Cairo is an oil painting created by Greek-French painter Théodore Jacques Ralli. Ralli was an orientalist painter who studied under Jean-Léon Gérôme at his studio workshop in the Beaux-Arts de Paris in 1873. Ralli visited Greece and Turkey in 1877 and Cairo, Egypt, in 1880, where the painter drew inspiration for his works. One of his earliest orientalist works to participate in an exhibition was Nasli Playing the Guitar. The work was exhibited in 1878-1880 at various exhibitions in France and England. By the early 1880s, Ralli had completed numerous orientalist works, including Bashi Bazouks in a Cafe in Smyrna Playing Cards 1877, Arab Soldier Flirting 1878, and La Sentinelle 1879. By this point, his works were heavily influenced by his teacher Gérôme. Gérôme and his student Aimé Morot completed Study for the Snake Charmer in 1877, which eventually became a painting by Gerome called The Snake Charmer, which is in the New Orleans Museum of Art in New Orleans, LA. Gerome's 1879 painting of the The Snake Charmer was exhibited at his studio to his students and was purchased by a collector in the United States by 1880. Ralli completed two works featuring snake charmers. Boa Charmer in a Harem at Cairo was completed in 1882, and The Sacred Serpent was also completed around the same period. Ralli completed a painting called Belly Dancer one year after Boa Charmer in a Harem at Cairo featuring the same actress and position.

Snake charming was popular in ancient Egypt. Snakes were used for healing and medicinal purposes. Exorcists also used snake charming to prevent the snake from biting, using incantations. Snake charming remained popular in North Africa, particularly in Cairo, Egypt, and Tangier, Morocco, in the 19th century. Snake Charmer at Tangier, Africa was completed by Louis Comfort Tiffany as early as 1872. By the 1880s, artists began to emulate the orientalist theme of snake charming. Nasreddine Dinet finished The Snake Charmer in 1889, and Guiseppe Gabani completed his version The Snake Charmer in the late 19th century. Famous Parisian actress Sarah Bernhardt popularised the boa constrictor during the period and owned one. Both Ralli and Gerome used a boa constrictor in their works. Ralli was also affiliated with Edouard Angelo, rumoured to be the lover of Sarah Bernhardt. Ralli created a work featuring Angelo called Edouard Angelo in a Theater Costume. Boa Charmer in a Harem at Cairo was last sold in the 1970s at Christie's auction.

== History ==
His teacher Gerome's The Snake Charmer was sold by his dealer Adolphe Goupil to an American named Albert Spencer in 1880. Ralli's work was exhibited in another English-speaking country called England, under the name Boa Charmer in a Harem at Cairo in 1882. It was exhibited at the Twelfth Annual Liverpool Autumn Exhibition of Modern Pictures at the Walker Art Gallery on William Brown Street. The year following it was exhibited on May 7, 1883, at the 115th exhibition of the Royal Academy in gallery 6, no. 563, and eventually made its way to English-speaking Australia. German-born Australian entrepreneur Friedrich Wilhelm Prell owned the work. He owned an import/export business in Melbourne, Australia, and eventually developed Prell’s Buildings. The painting was purchased by John Monash, an Australian military commander of the First World War and a civil engineer. Monash purchased Prell's mansion, Iona, in Melbourne, Australia, along with some paintings, including Ralli's Boa Charmer in a Harem at Cairo in 1913. By the 1970s, the work was sold at a Christie's auction in London to a private collector.

== Description ==
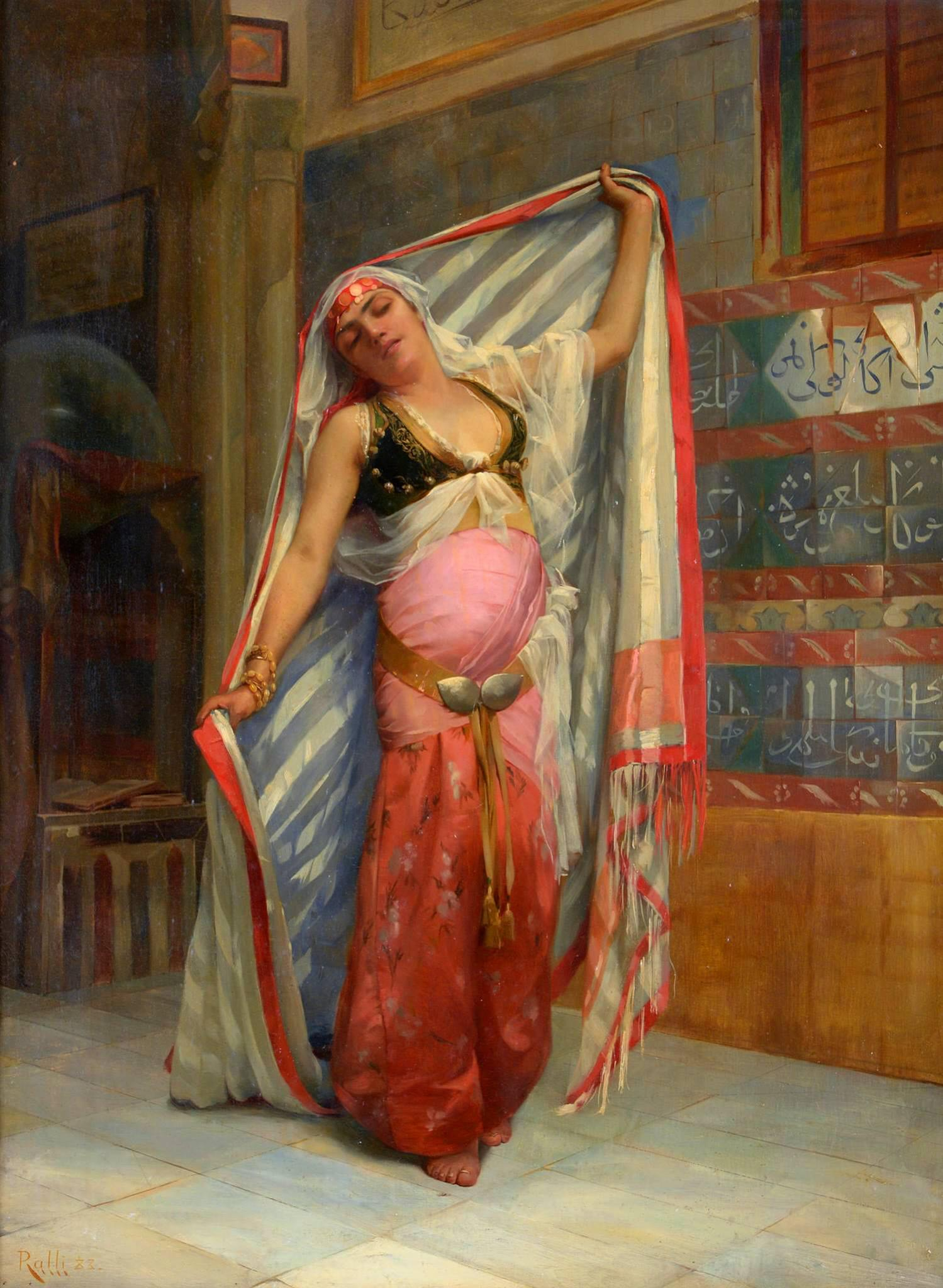
Belly Dancer completed one year later.

The painting was created using oil paint and canvas. Ralli completed a comparable work one year later called the Belly Dancer. Both works feature the same woman in the same position. Ralli's work was inspired by his teacher Gerome's snake painting completed in 1879.

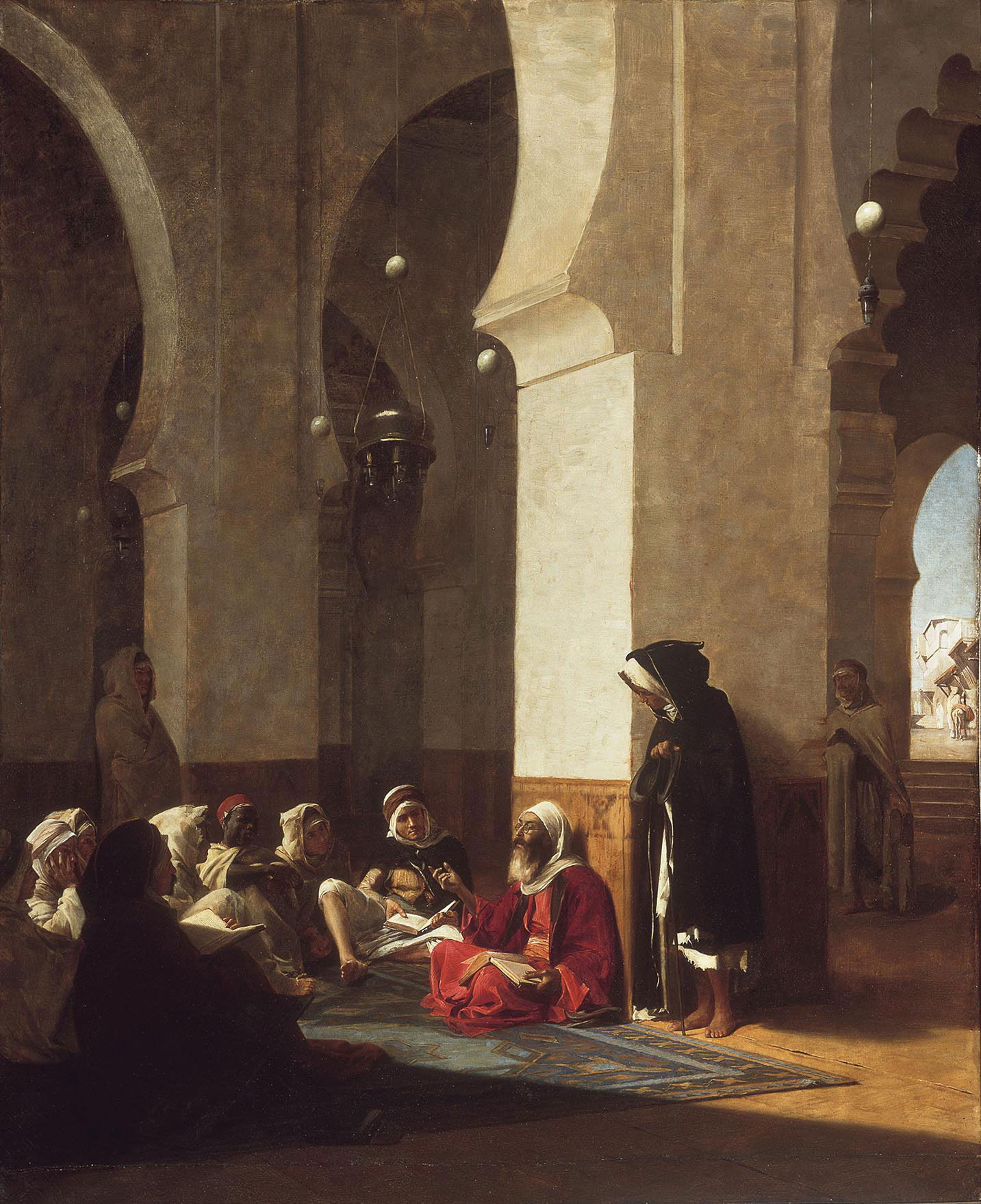
Catechism in the Mosque of Algiers c. 1883

Ralli's work was 65.5 cm (25.7 in) in height and 92.5 cm (36.4 in) in width, roughly twelve inches smaller in height and width than his predecessors' work, which was 83.8 cm (32.9 in) in height and 122.1 cm (48 in) in width. Ralli's painting takes place in the interior of a harem. Ten women are present, including the star, who is bare-breasted, standing near two boa constrictors as she holds another one perfectly spread across her arms. The harem interior is full of orientalist decorative motifs, including an Ottoman candle holder, divan, onion dome, mihrab, circular brass mosque lamp, and hookah pipe. The pierced semi-circular brass mosque or harem lamp, resembling a brass helmet lantern with glass oil lamps, is recurring in some of Ralli's works; it appears in Catechism in the Mosque of Algiers completed in 1883. The room features embroidered pillows and an oriental decorative carpet. The women are dressed in harem pants, headwraps, turbans, and silk sashes. Some are wearing vests, and a tiger carpet is draped over the divan. Three of the women are playing music: a flute, a stringed instrument, and a tambourine, while the snake woman dances. The octagonal bronze brazier (charcoal burner) to our left, close to the divan, was typically used to make tea or coffee, burn incense, and sometimes warm the room. The floor features orientalist-themed tiles. The painting was signed and dated to the lower left Ralli 82.

== Gallery ==
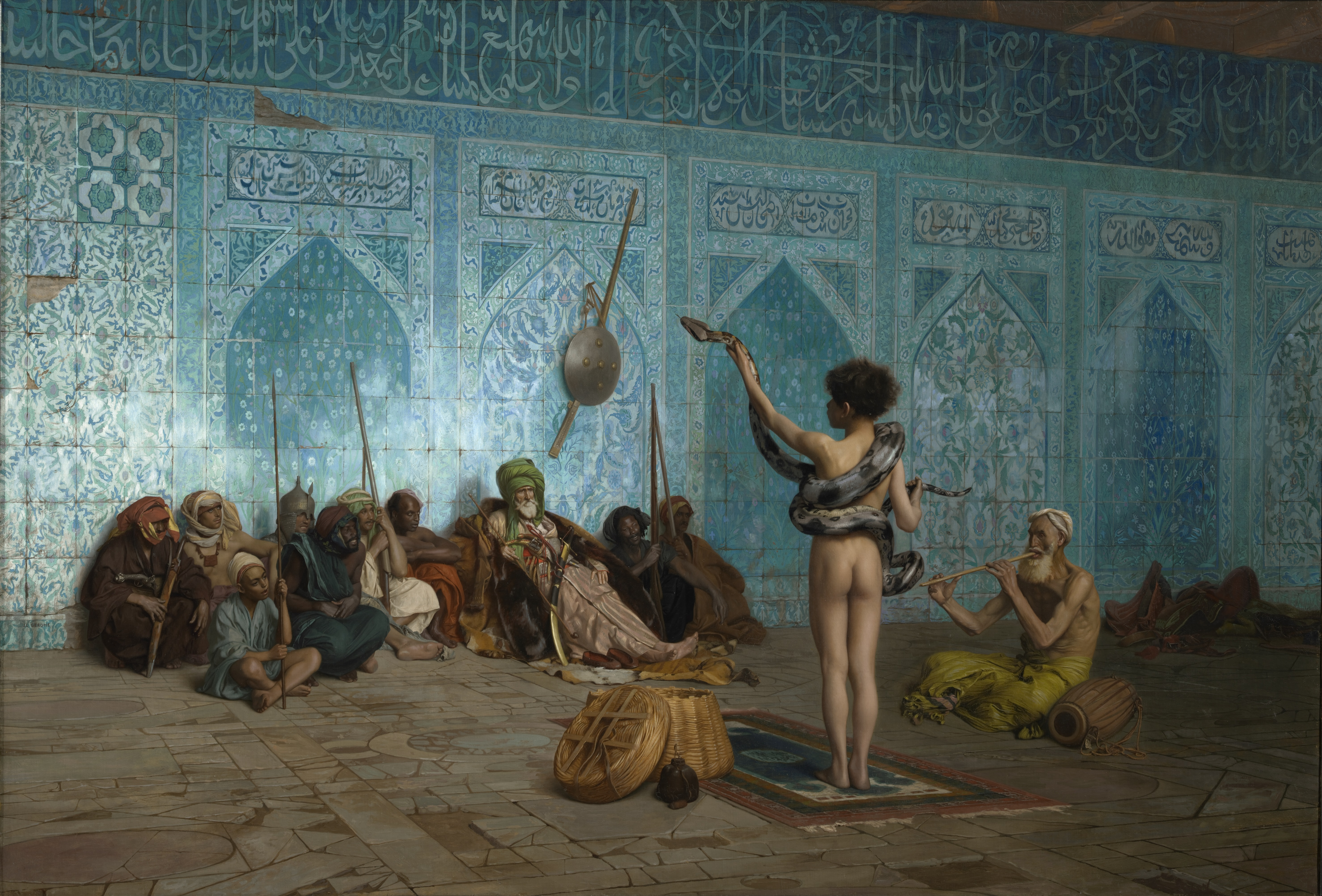
Le charmeur de serpents, by Jean-Léon Gérôme c. (1879)

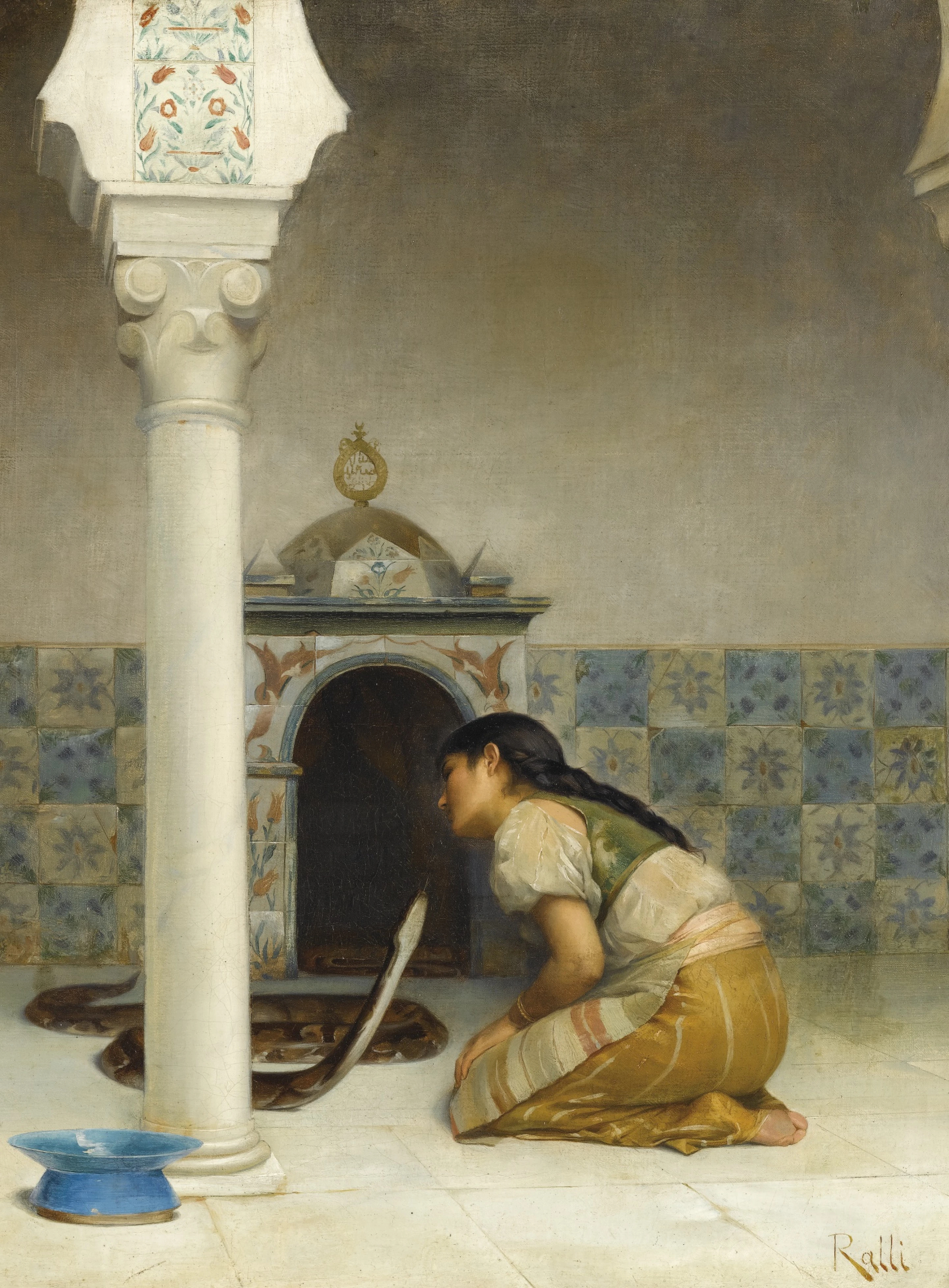
The Sacred Serpent, by Théodore Ralli c. (1882)

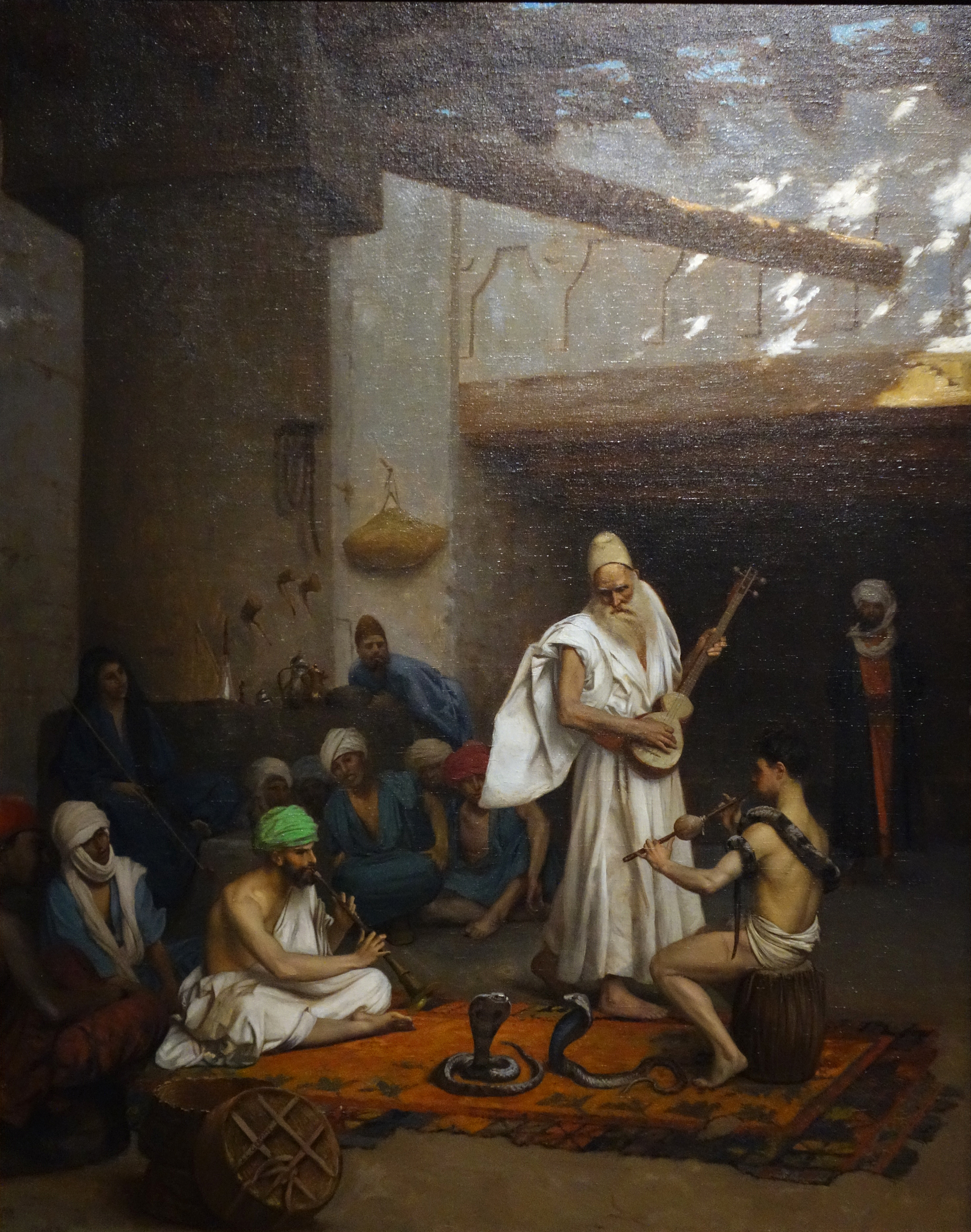
The Snake Charmer, by Jean-Léon Gérôme c. 1880–1890

=== Additional snake charmers ===
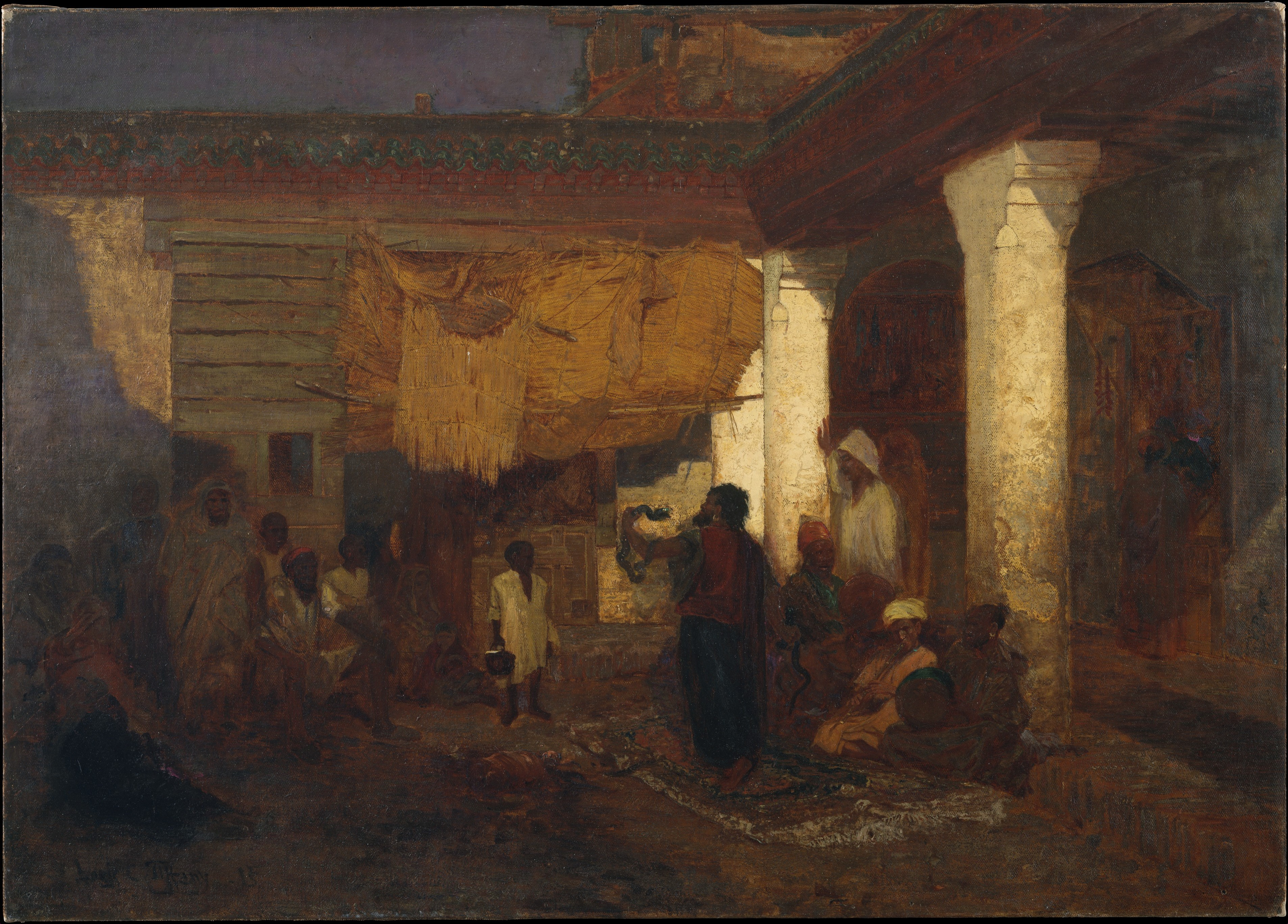
Snake Charmer at Tangier, Africa by Louis Comfort Tiffany c. 1872

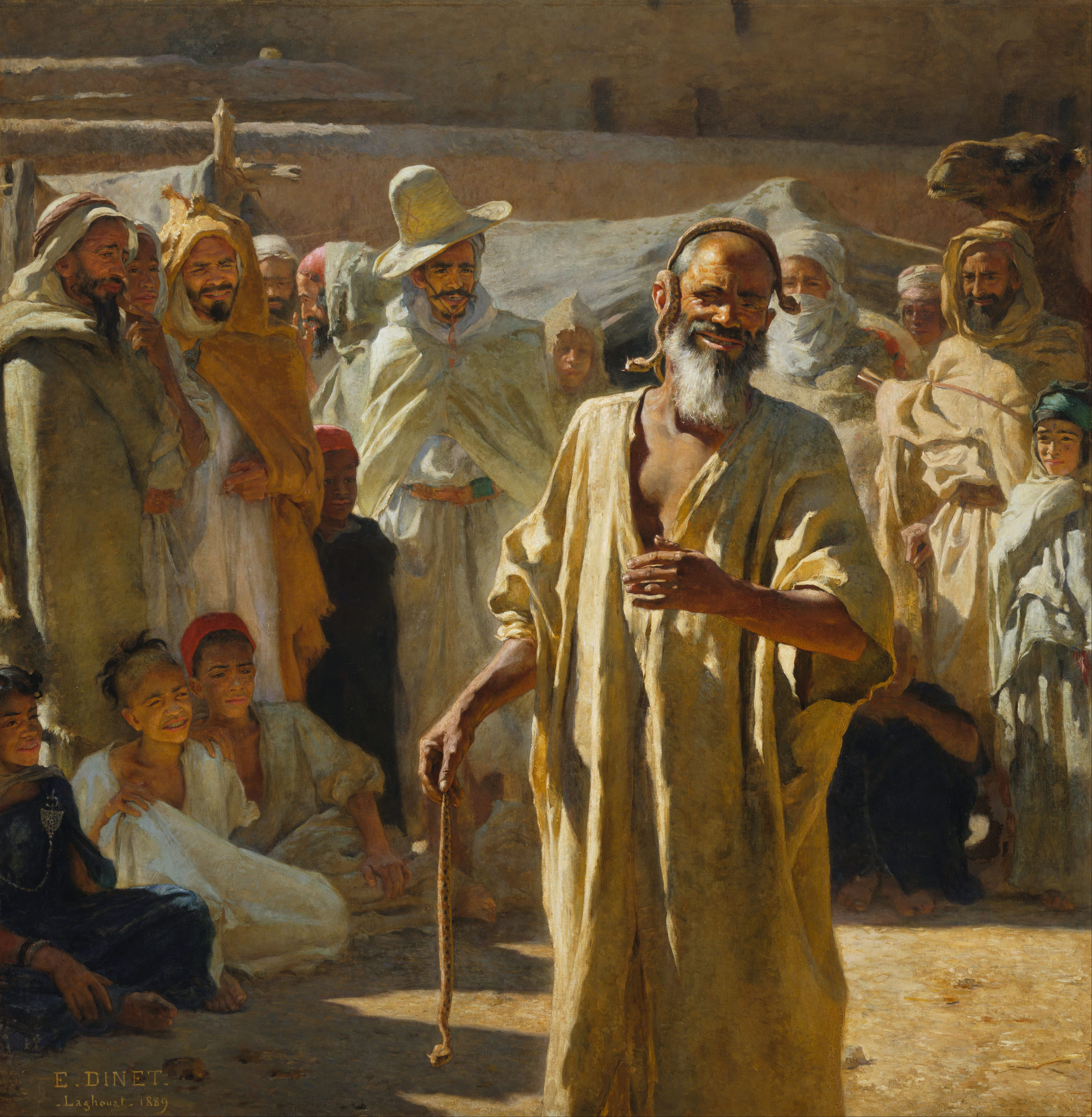
The Snake Charmer by Nasreddine Dinet c. 1889

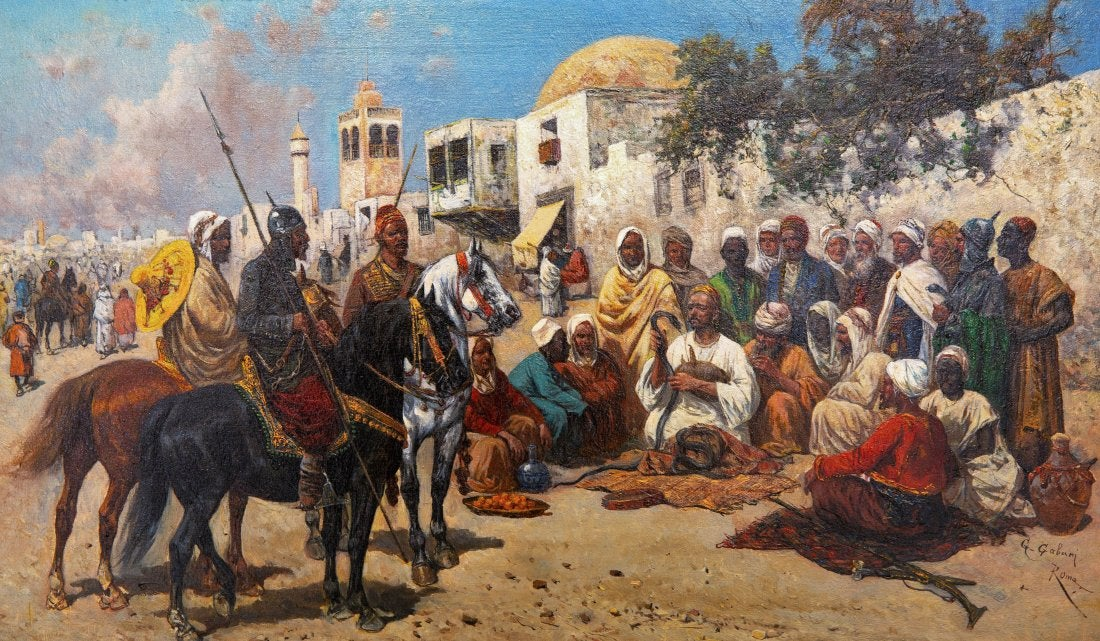
The Snake Charmer by Guiseppe Gabani c. late 19th century

== Bibliography ==
- Palioura, Maria Mirka (2008). Το ζωγραφικό έργο του Θεόδωρου Ράλλη (1852-1909): πηγές έμπνευσης - οριενταλιστικά θέματα [The Work of the Painter Theodoros Rallis (1852-1909): Sources of Inspiration - Orientalist Themes] (Thesis) (in Greek). Athens, Greece: University of Athens. doi:10.12681/eadd/22456.
- Palioura, Mirka Α. (December 14, 2014). "Theodoros Ralli Looking East" (PDF). Athens, Greece: Benaki Museum. Archived (PDF) from the original on September 11, 2025.
- Serle, Geoffrey (2013). John Monash A Biography. Melbourne, Australia: Melbourne University Press. ISBN 9780522863642.
- Graves, Algernon (1906). The Royal Academy of Arts a Complete Dictionary of Contributors and Their Work from Its Foundation in 1769 to 1904 ·Volume 6. London, UK: H. Graves and Company, Limited and George Bell and Sons.
