= Yashmak =

Turkish and Turkmen type of veil or niqab worn by women

A yashmak, yashmac or yasmak (from Turkish: yaşmak, "a veil") is a Turkish, Egyptian and Turkmen type of veil or niqāb worn by women to cover their faces in public. During the Ottoman Empire, the garment eventually became transparent in the middle part of the 19th century. Upper-class women wore the transparent yashmak, while the peasants still had to cover their faces.

Eventually, due to various feminist uprisings, women stopped wearing the yashmak. One such woman who caused the abandonment of the yashmak in Egypt during the 1920s was Huda Sha'arawi. Today, there is almost no usage of this garment in Turkey and Egypt. In Turkmenistan, however, it is still consciously used by some married women in the presence of elder relatives of a husband.

== Description ==
Unlike an ordinary veil, a yashmak contains a head-veil and a face-veil in one, thus consisting of two pieces of fine muslin, one tied across the face under the nose, and the other tied across the forehead, draping the head.

A yashmak can also include a rectangle of woven black horsehair attached close to the temples and sloping down like an awning to cover the face, called peçe, or it can be a veil covered with pieces of lace, having slits for the eyes, tied behind the head by strings and sometimes supported over the nose by a small piece of gold.

== Modernization ==
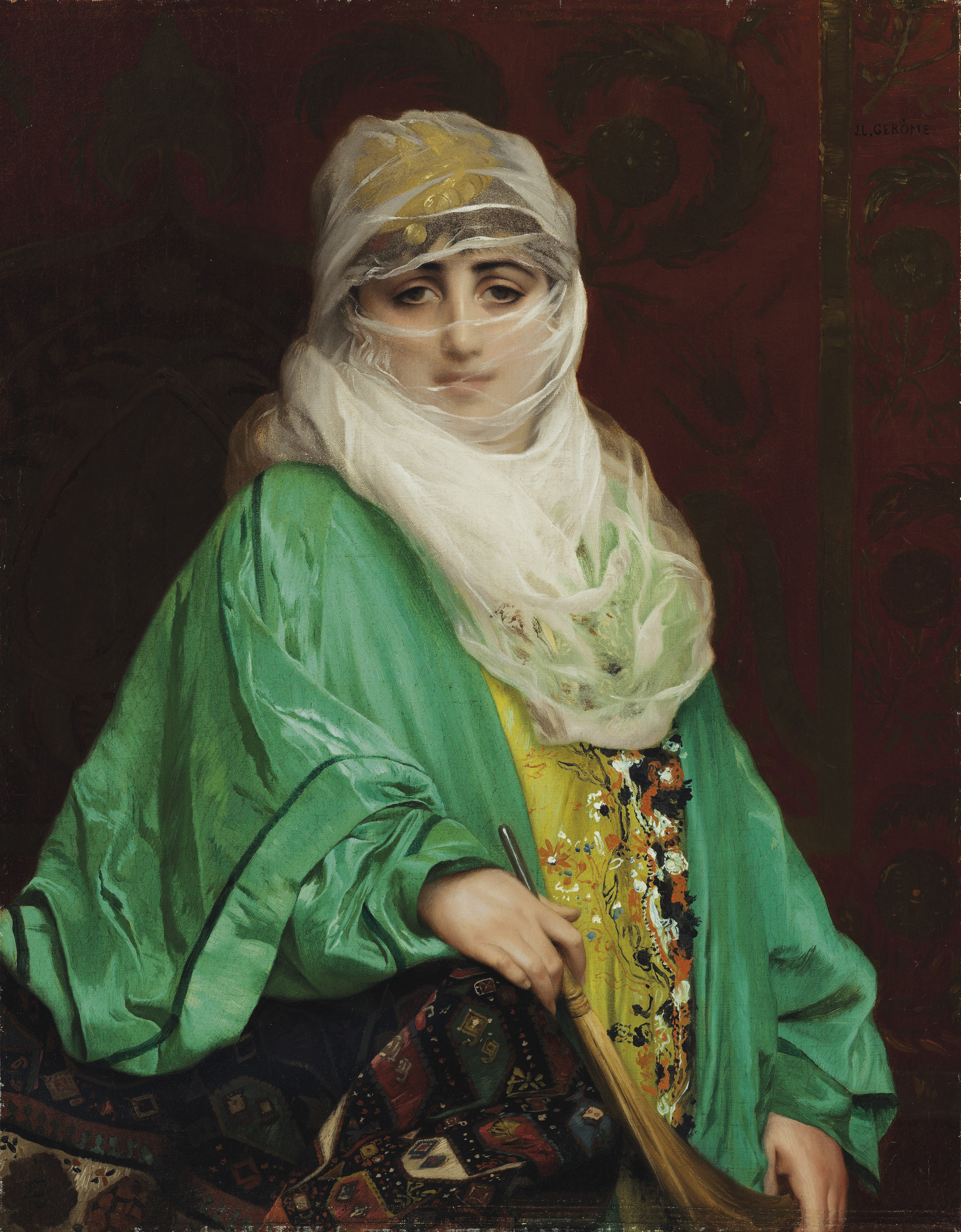
Woman from Constantinople by Jean-Léon Gérôme c. 1876

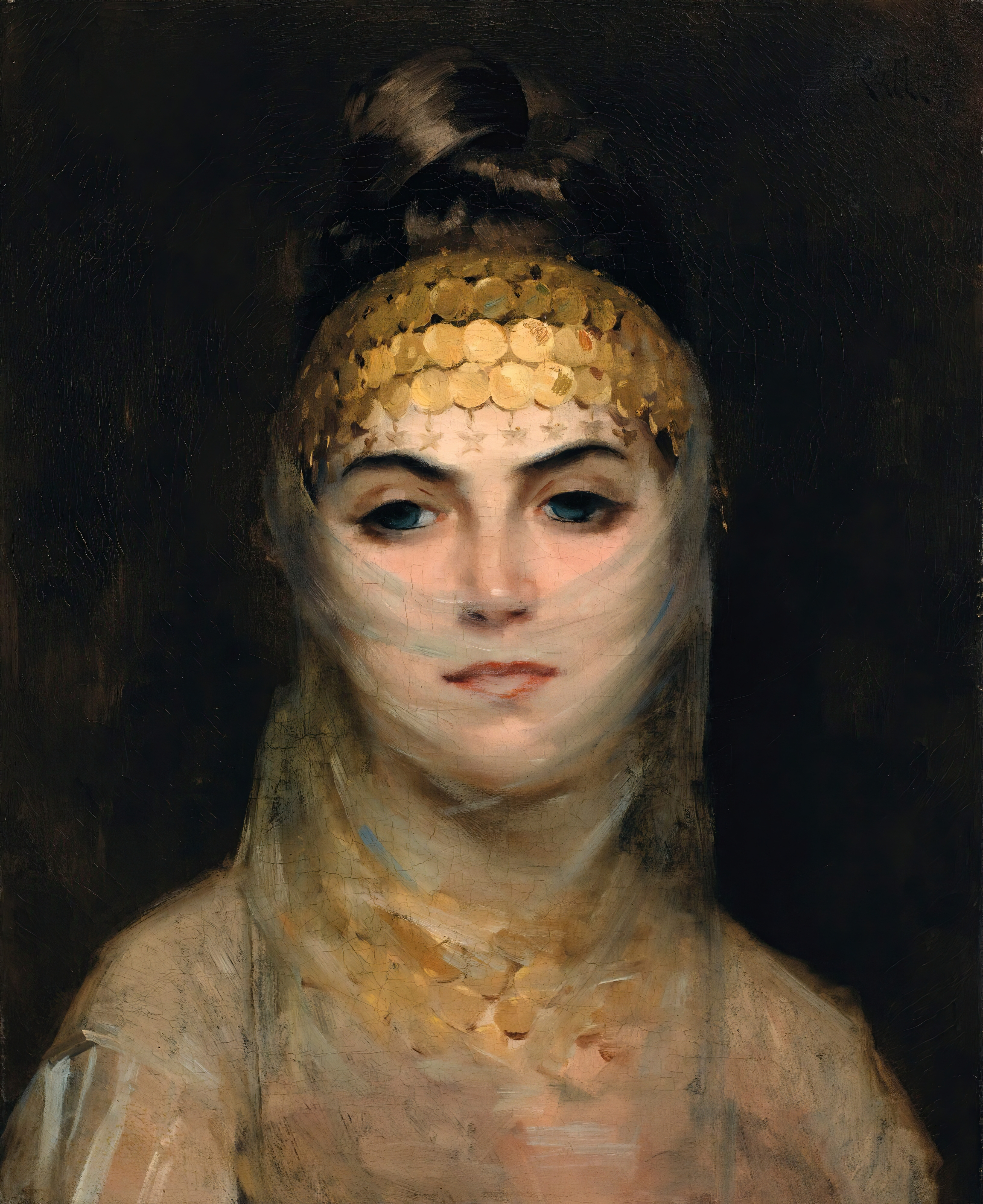
The Odalisque with Blue Eyes by Théodore Jacques Ralli c. 1873-1909,

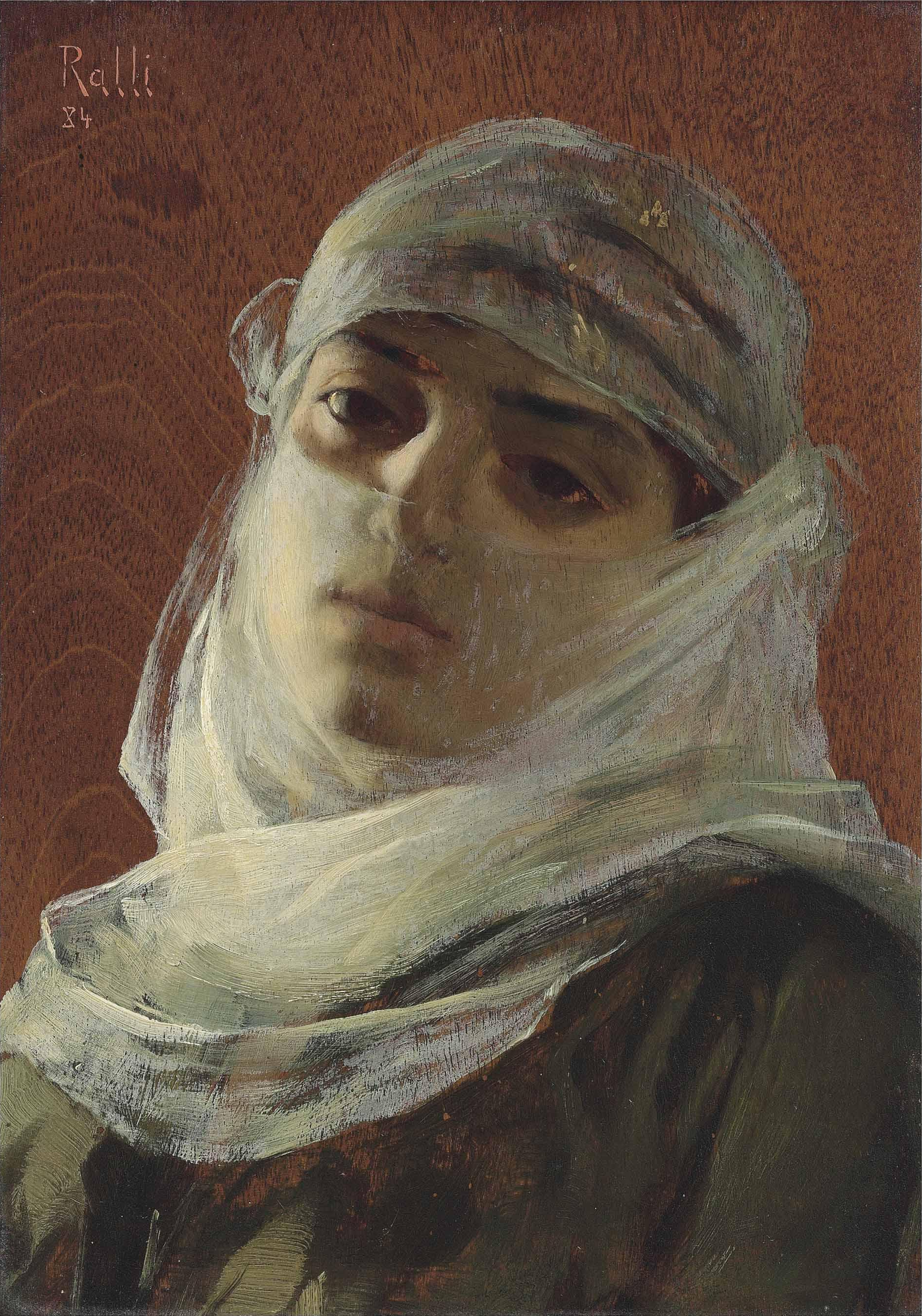
Innocent Odalisque by Théodore Jacques Ralli c. 1884,

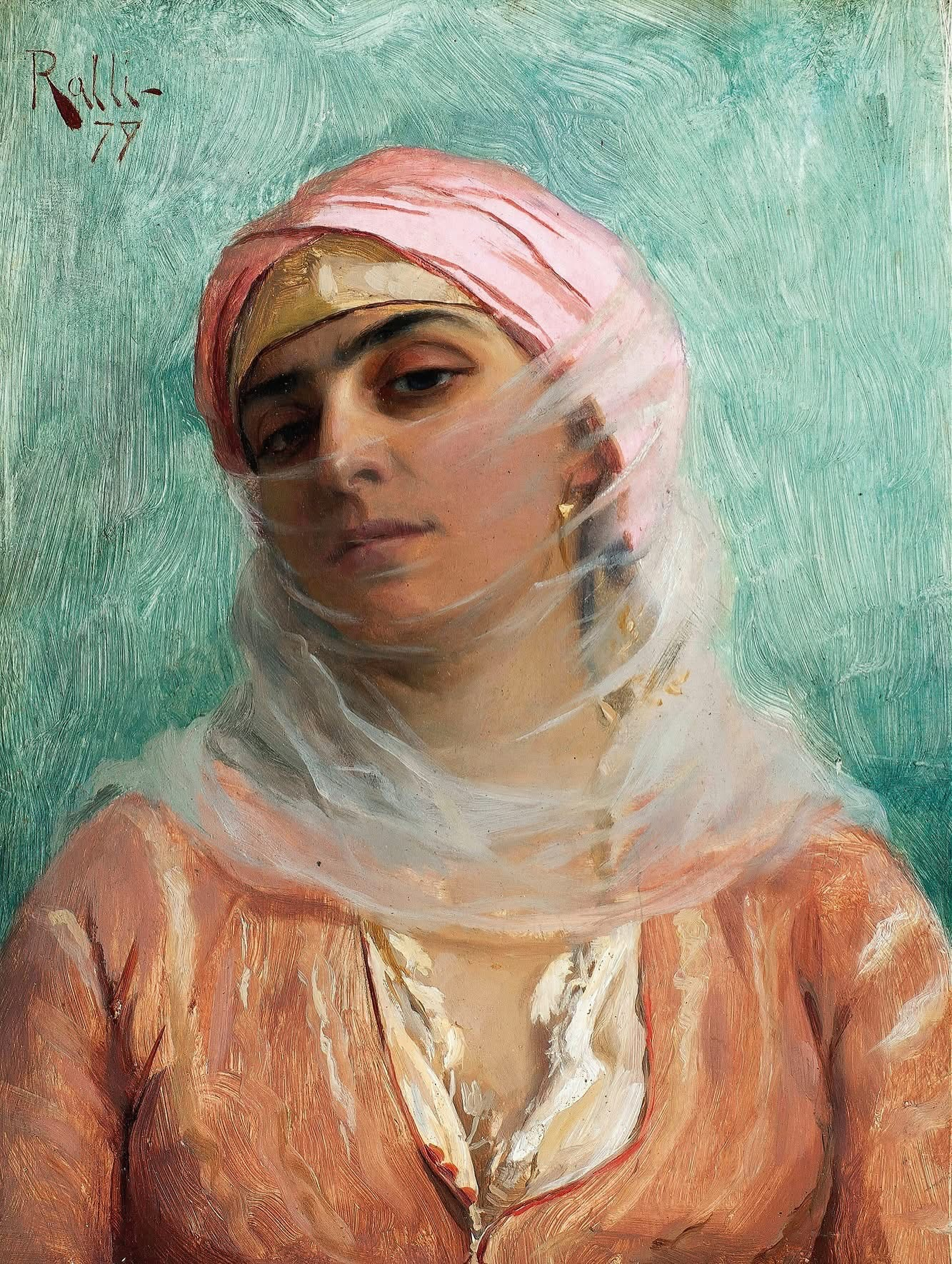
Young Ottoman Woman by Théodore Jacques Ralli c. 1879,

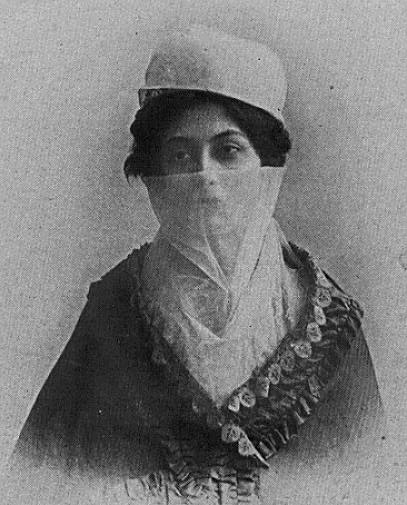
Young Halidé Edib in a yashmak

By the 1860s, in the Ottoman Empire, the yashmak became thinner and more revealing. Upper-class women typically wore a thinner and more revealing yashmak. Photographs from Istanbul show women wearing thin yashmaks. However, peasants were still required to wear a facial covering that completely concealed their faces.

Paintings from the era show more revealing facial characteristics for women wearing veils. One such work was completed by Jean-Léon Gérôme entitled Woman from Constantinople in 1876. His student Théodore Jacques Ralli also completed several works of the same style, revealing the woman's face. Radical movements in Turkey, Egypt, and Morocco caused the eventual decline and removal of the yashmak entirely during the 20th century.

== See also ==
- Islam and clothing
- Burqa
- Chador
- Hijab
- Tudung

== Sources ==
- Adrienne Lynn Edgar (5 September 2006). Tribal Nation: The Making of Soviet Turkmenistan. Princeton University Press. pp. 235–238. ISBN 978-1-4008-4429-6.
- Vogelsang-Eastwood, Gillian; Vogelsang, W.J. (1 December 2008). Covering the Moon: An Introduction to Middle Eastern Face Veils. Peeters. pp. 61–63. ISBN 978-90-429-1990-7.
