= Nasli Playing the Guitar =

Painting by Théodore Jacques Ralli

- Nasli Jouant de le Guitare (French)
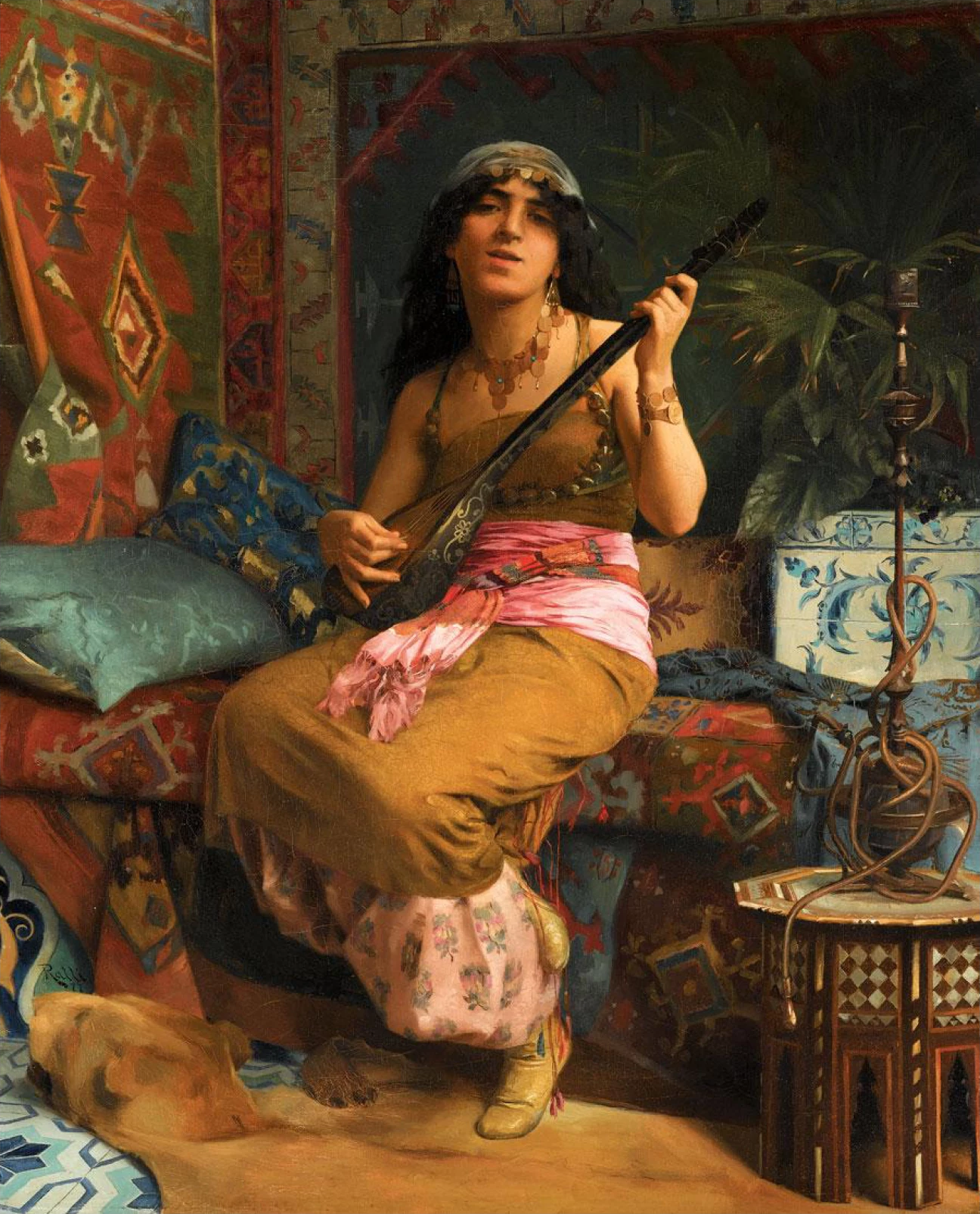
- Artist: Théodore Jacques Ralli
- Year: c. 1877
- Medium: Oil on canvas
- Movement: French School; Orientalism
- Subject: A slave girl Nasli plays the tanbur in a harem.
- Dimensions: 56 cm × 46 cm (22 in × 18.1 in)
- Owner: Private Collector

Nasli Playing the Guitar is an oil painting created by Greek-French painter Théodore Jacques Ralli. Ralli was born and raised in Constantinople, which was part of the Ottoman Empire. In his early life, the painter was exposed to orientalist clothing, carpets, coffee shops, bazaars, and daily life in the Empire. Ralli was a member of the prominent Greek merchant family known as the Ralli Brothers, eventually settling in London to work for the family. Ralli traveled to Paris, France, in 1873 to study painting under Jean-Léon Gérôme at his workshop at the Beaux-Arts de Paris. Ralli was infactuated with Cairo, Egypt, because of a painting he saw of Jean-Jules-Antoine Lecomte du Nouÿ at an exhibition around the same period. The painting featured Cairo and was called The Bearers of Bad News. Both Gérôme and Lecomte du Nouÿ were orientalist painters featuring subjects from Cairo. Ralli traveled to Cairo in 1880, eventually opening a studio and organizing a Paris Salon-like exhibition in the 1890s called the Cairo Salon. Ralli painted odalisques, bashi bazouks, eunuchs, Arab soldiers, bedouins, camels, Arabs, mosques, harems, belly dancers, snake charmers, Jewish subjects, and Turkish baths.

Paris, France, was considered a fashionable city in the late 1800s. Orientalism was a unique phenomenon among artistic socialites. The style offered insight into the world of the Ottoman Empire and the Middle East, often displaying a world foreign to the people of the French Capital. French art critic Jules-Antoine Castagnary popularized the term Orientalism in the 19th century, denoting subjects influenced by artists' travels to Western Asia. By 1893, Ralli's teacher Jean-Léon Gérôme was the honorary president of the French Society of Orientalist Painters, founded in 1893. Gérôme heavily influenced Ralli's orientalist works.

Gérôme studied under the orientalist Jean-Auguste-Dominique Ingres. Gérôme traveled to Egypt for the first time in 1856, and two years later, he completed The Lute Player, which was set in Cairo, Egypt. The work features an arnaut playing a lute. One of Ralli's earliest orientalist works, Nasli Playing the Guitar was completed in 1877, emulating The Lute Player. Ralli completed another work featuring a lute player in 1881 called Serenade in Cairo. Other works featuring similar instruments include: Ferdinand Max Bredt's Serenade in Harem and Paul Le Thimmonier's Odalisque (Haremsdame) completed between 1875 and 1896. Some media list Nasli as a slave girl in a harem. In his orientalist paintings, Ralli sought to share the realism of everyday life throughout orientalist communities. The work has a rich exhibition history during its early period and was sold in 2006 at a Sotheby's auction in London.

== History ==
Paris, France, hosted the world's fair called the 1878 Universal Exposition. The United States hosted the event in 1876 in Philadelphia, PA, called the Centennial Exposition, and by 1880, the event was held in Melbourne, Australia, called Melbourne International Exhibition. The city featured numerous fine art exhibitions as part of the world's fair. Ralli presented an orientalist work known as Bashi Bazouks in a Cafe in Smyrna Playing Cards at the Paris Salon of 1878 at the Grand Palais des Champs-Élysées in the Palais de l'Industrie building. Nasli Playing the Guitar, Nurmahal the Egyptian Dancing Girl, along with two other works, were exhibited at the Exposition Universelle Fine Arts section (Beaux-Arts) of the world's fair at the Trocadéro Palace. Nasli Playing the Guitar and Nurmahal the Egyptian Dancing Girl were also orientalist works, and Ralli began to emulate his teacher Gerome, who was praised for his exemplary work with Ralli. The three works presented were some of Ralli's earliest orientalist works submitted to an exhibition. The next year, Nasli Playing the Guitar was exhibited at the 1879 Exhibition of Works of Modern Artists at the Royal Albert Hall of Arts and Sciences in London. The event took place at Royal Albert Hall, South Kensington, London. By 1880, the work was also exhibited at the Tenth Annual Liverpool Autumn Exhibition of Modern Pictures at the Walker Art Gallery on William Brown Street. Not much is known about who purchased the work it was in a private collection in France, which resurfaced on May 22, 2006, in London, UK, and was sold at a Sotheby's auction for 50,400 GBP.

== Description ==
The oil painting on canvas was completed around the same year Ralli traveled to Greece and Turkey in 1877. His mother had a relative (Ioannis Psiachis), who lived in Smyrna, Turkey. The height is 56 cm (22 in) and the width is 46 cm (18.1 in). The work is a precursor to many orientalist works that follow, which Jean-Léon Gérôme heavily influenced. The painting is of a slave girl playing a tanbur in a harem alcove. The room is saturated with orientalist textiles. The young, innocent teenage girl Nasli sits on a divan with embroidered pillows. The walls are covered in orientalist decorative carpet tapestries. The potted plant features a pattern reminiscent of Iznik pottery or Delftware pottery. A hookah pipe rests on an octagonal inlaid table that features mashrabiya decorative motifs. The room is a classic Islamic architectural design; the floor under Nasli's feet features geometric tilework and a lion skin carpet. The work was signed and dated Ralli 77.

== Gallery ==
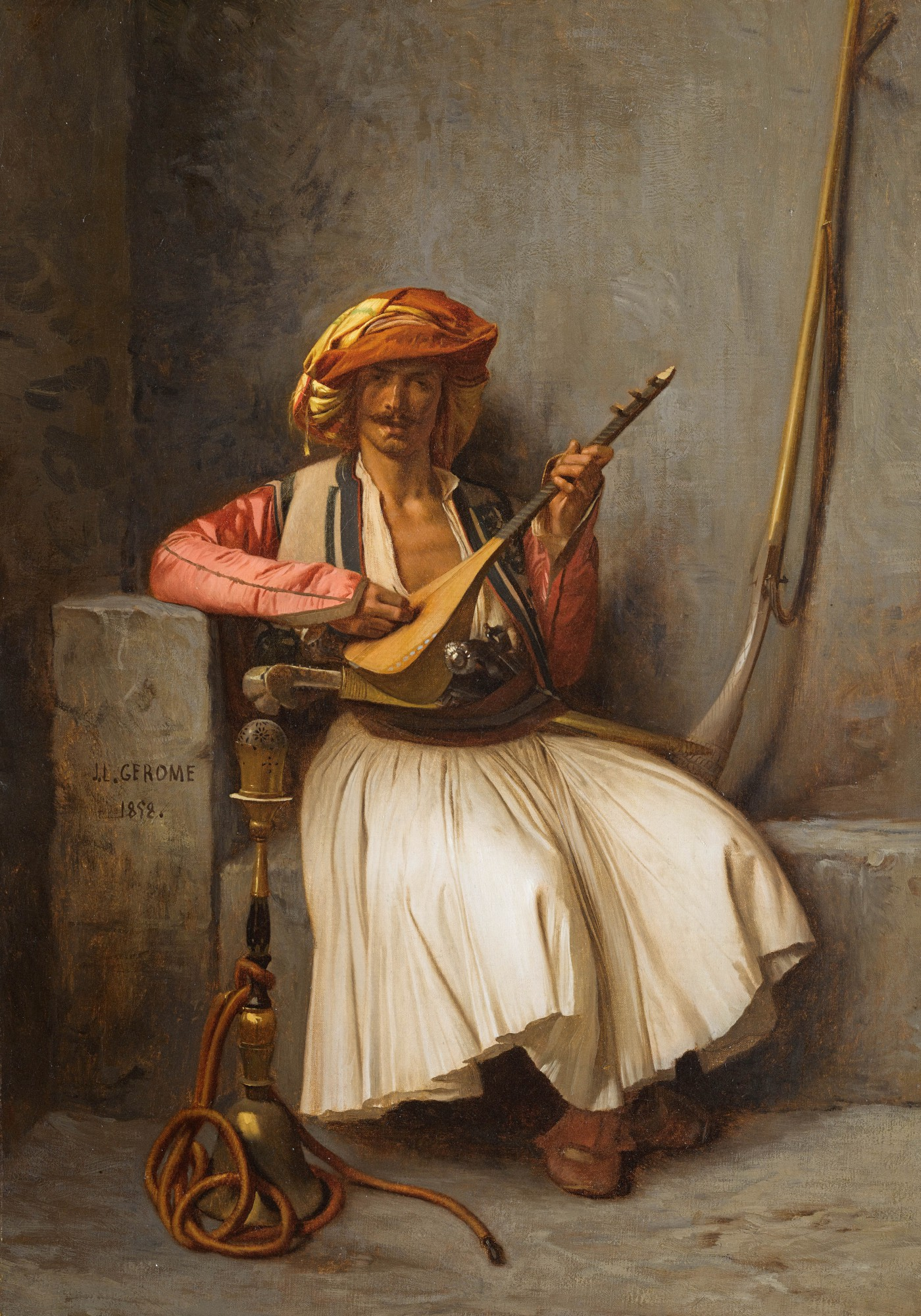
The Lute Player , by Jean-Léon Gérôme c. (1858)

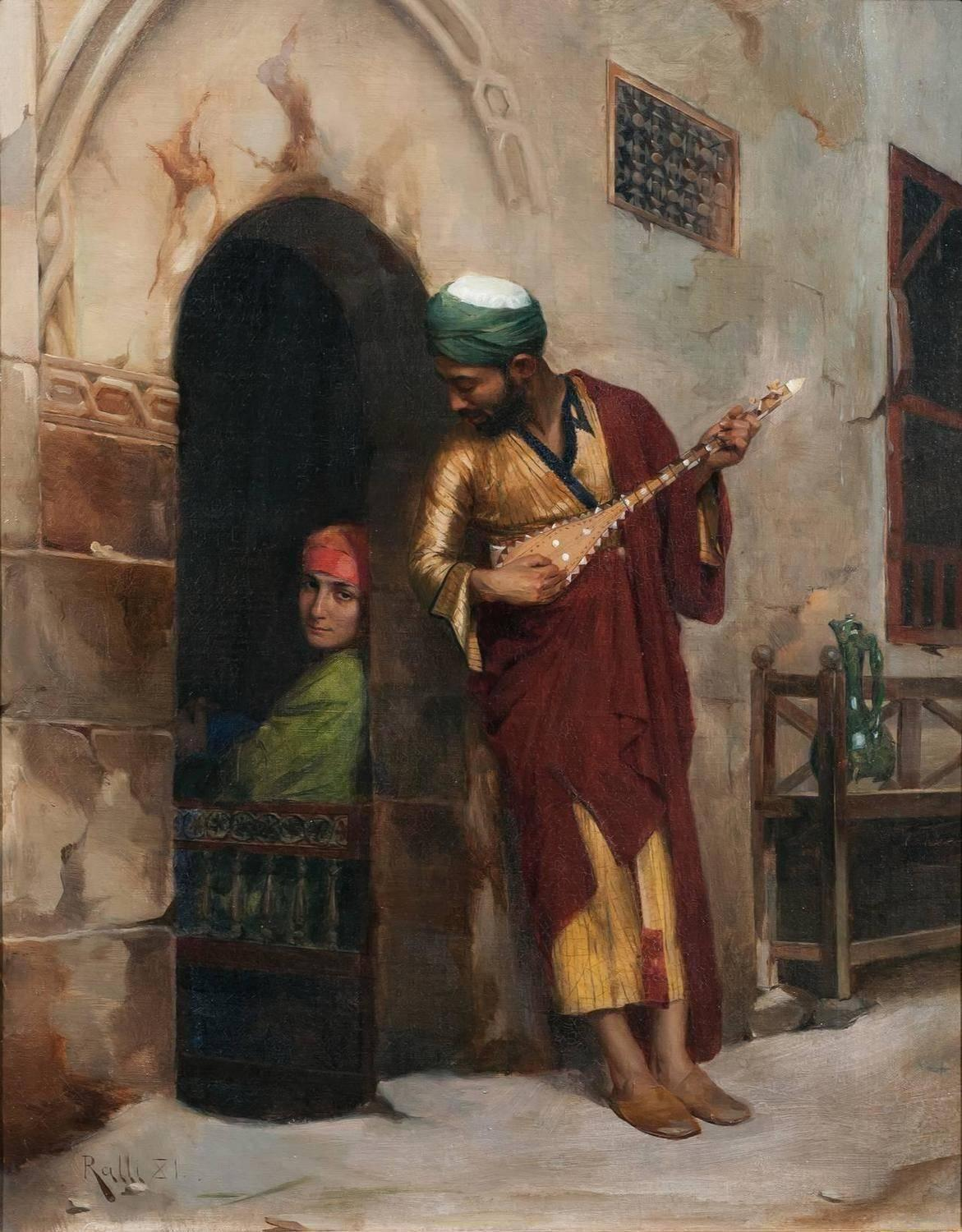
Serenade in Cairo, by Théodore Ralli c. (1881)

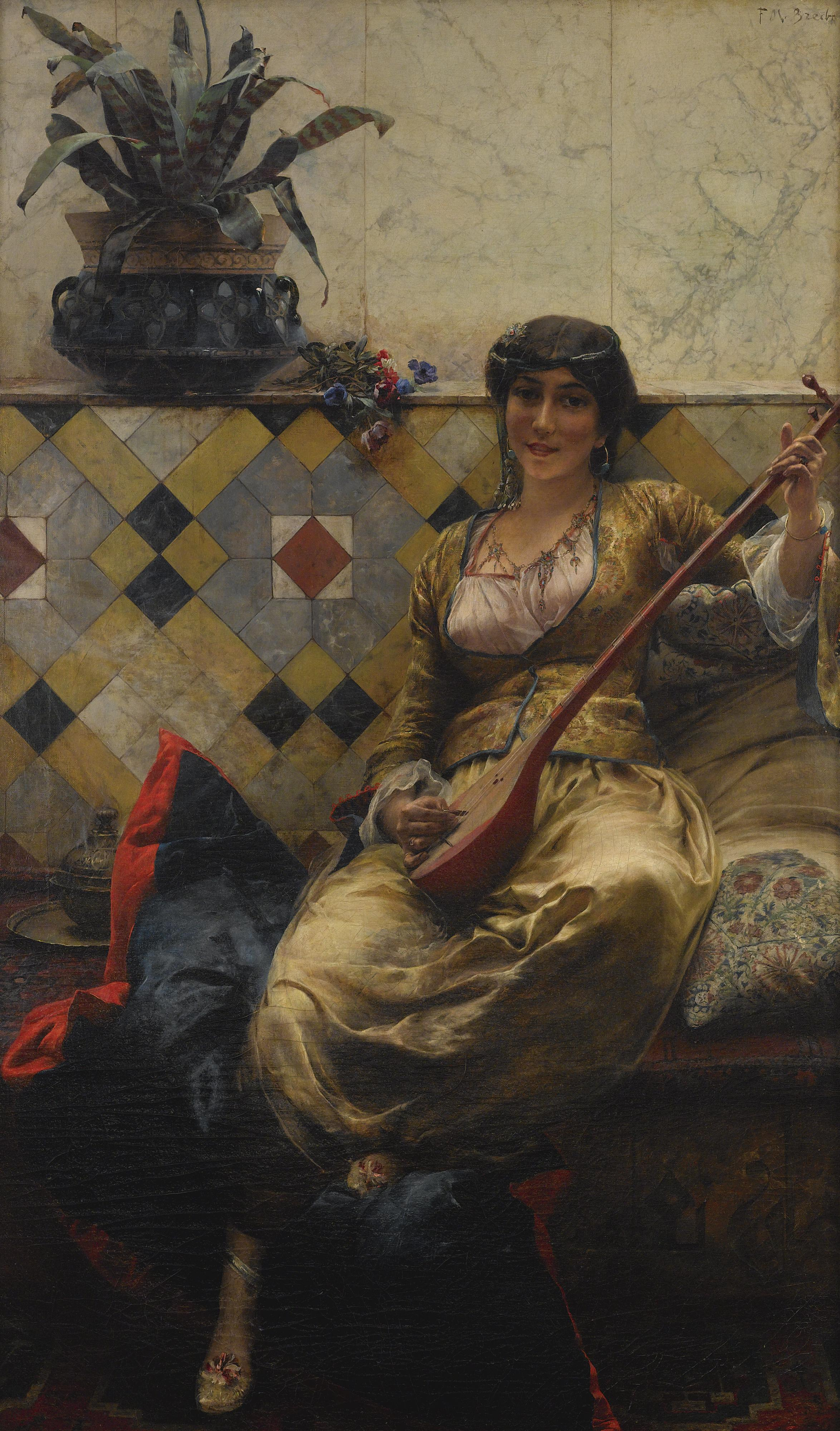
Serenade in Harem, by Ferdinand Max Bredt c. 1880–1921

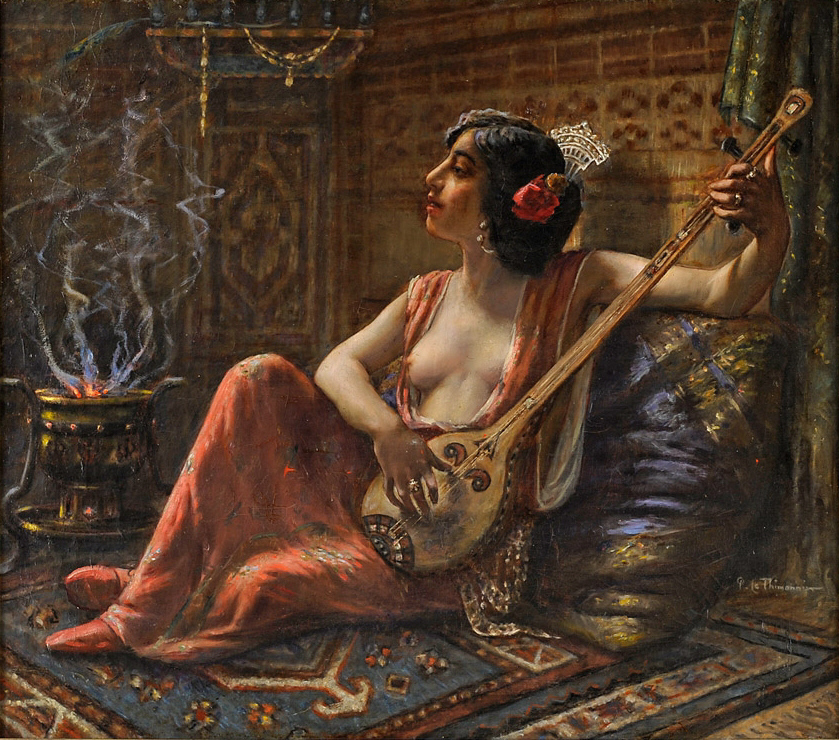
Odalisque , by Paul Le Thimmonier, female slave, c. 1875–1896

== Bibliography ==
- Palioura, Maria Mirka (2008). Το ζωγραφικό έργο του Θεόδωρου Ράλλη (1852-1909): πηγές έμπνευσης - οριενταλιστικά θέματα [The Work of the Painter Theodoros Rallis (1852-1909): Sources of Inspiration - Orientalist Themes] (Thesis) (in Greek). Athens, Greece: University of Athens. doi:10.12681/eadd/22456.
- Palioura, Mirka Α. (December 14, 2014). "Theodoros Ralli Looking East" (PDF). Athens, Greece: Benaki Museum. Archived (PDF) from the original on September 11, 2025.
- Véron, Théodore (1878). Dictionnaire Véron ou Mémorial de l'Art et des Artistes de mon temps Le salon de 1878 et l'exposition Universelle [Véron Dictionary or Memorial of Art and Artists of My Time The Salon of 1878 and the Universal Exhibition] (in French). Vol. 2. Paris, France: Chez M. Bazin.
- Tromans, Nicholas; Kabbani, Rana (2008). The Lure of the East British Orientalist Painting. New Haven, Connecticut: Yale Center for British Art. ISBN 9781854377333.
- Harding, James (1979). Artistes Pompiers French Academic Art in the 19th Century. New York, New York: Rizzoli International Publications.
