= Refectory in a Greek Monastery =

Painting by Théodore Jacques Ralli

- Réfectoire dans un monastère grec (French)
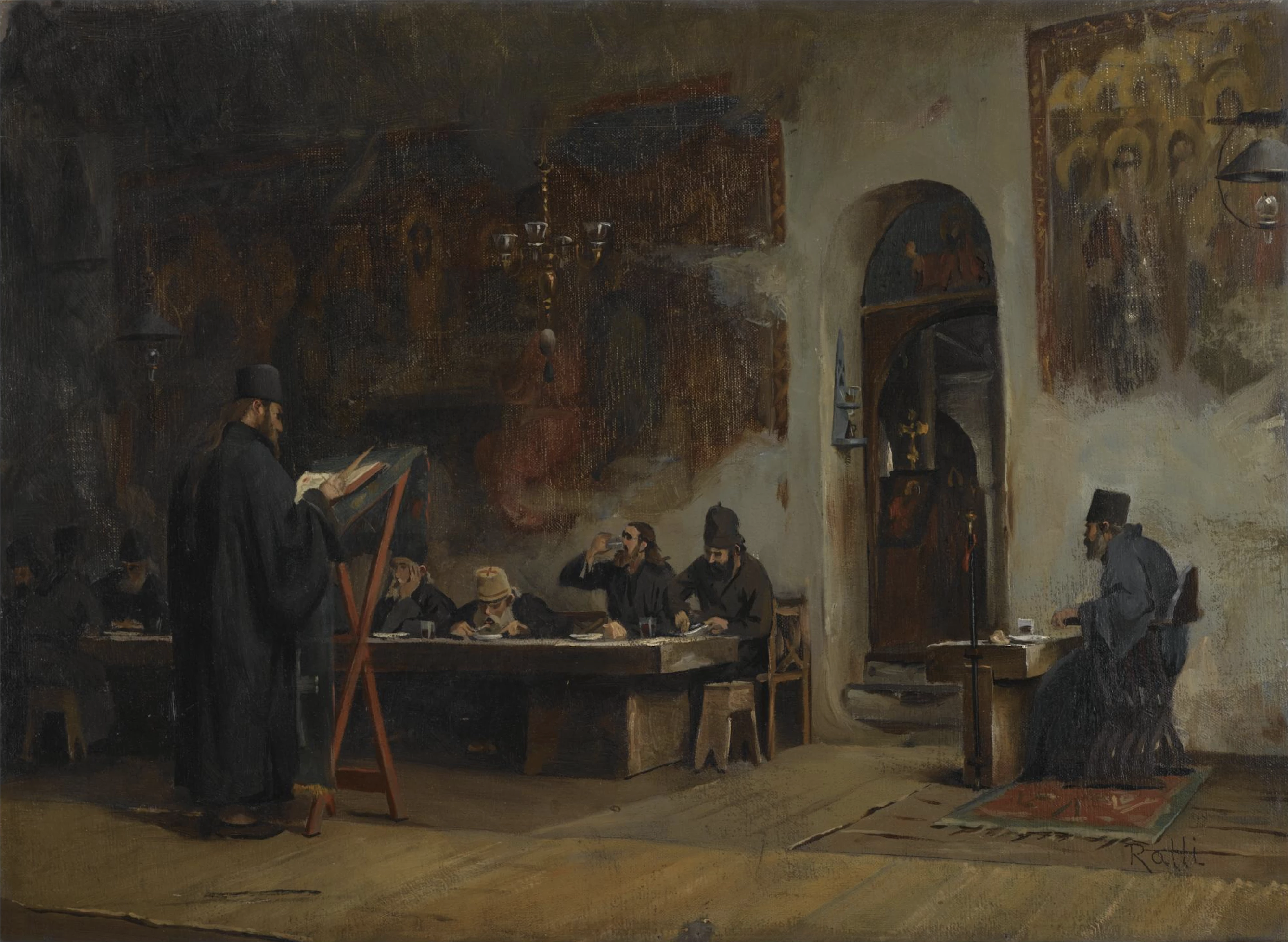
- Artist: Théodore Jacques Ralli
- Year: c. 1885
- Medium: Oil on canvas
- Movement: French School; Greek Everyday Life
- Subject: Refectory in a Greek Monastery
- Dimensions: 29.2 cm × 40.5 cm (11.4 in × 15.9 in)
- Owner: Private Collector

Refectory in a Greek Monastery is an oil painting created by Greek-French painter Théodore Jacques Ralli. Ralli was born in Constantinople to Greek parents Iakovos Rallis and Katina Psiachi. Rallis was fortunate to be a member of the family that owned Rallis Brothers. It was one of the most successful expatriate Greek merchant businesses of the Victorian era. Ralli was known for creating orientalist, impressionist, and works of Greek everyday life. Ralli submitted works to the prestigious Paris Salon as early as 1875, with his first Greek works appearing in 1877. Praying in a Greek Church, Mount Parnassus was completed in 1876 and submitted to the Salon one year later, featuring the interior of a Greek Orthodox Church. The painter travelled to Greece in April 1876 to attend an art exhibition at the National Technical University of Athens and visited Thebes, Arachova, and other parts of Central Greece, which inspired his works. Another major documented trip to Greece was when the artist visited the Monastic community of Mount Athos in August 1885. Luckily, he kept a diary.

Mount Athos is home to over twenty Greek Monasteries and has autonomous self-government. The location is very important to the Greek people as the spiritual heart of the Greek Orthodox Church, but is also important to Greek painters due to its rich history with the Heptanese school and Cretan school. Notable Greek painters who lived at Mount Athos were Theophanes the Cretan, Dionysios of Fourna, Makarios, and Frangos Katelanos. Rallis traveled to the sacred monastery to draw inspiration from Byzantine art, the art of the Heptanese school, and the Cretan school, staying for fifteen days. He visited fewer than eleven monasteries, some included: Vatopedi, Esphigmenou, Zographou, and Dohiariou. Ralli painted a large number of works featuring Greek Orthodox Church interiors featuring the traditional clothing of Greece, Greek Orthodox priests, iconostasis, icons, icon corners, frescos, analogion, kliros, candelabra, sanctuary lamps, and burning candles. Ralli was inspired by his visit to Mount Athos and completed numerous works featuring the holy place.

Rallis works A Vision, The Hagiographer, The Monk Iconographer and Refectory in a Greek Monastery were directly influenced by Mount Athos. While works such as Resting in a Greek Monastery featured a woman in a monastery where a priest gives her a savage glance, reflecting that women were forbidden from visiting the monasteries at Mount Athos. Rallis completed a work called The Captive the same year as Refectory in a Greek Monastery, but it features a ramsacked Greek Orthodox church symbolizing the danger the surrounding region of Chalkidiki still faced from piracy and slavery. The region was freed from the Ottomans on November 2, 1912. Another major work in an Orthodox church was Holy Friday, Greece, completed in 1893, featuring the sacred rituals performed on Good Friday in Greece. Refectory in a Greek Monastery is currently held in a private collection.

== History ==
According to Maria Mirka Palioura, two very similar works were completed, with the current work having dimensions: 29.2 cm (11.4 in) height and 40.5 cm (15.9 in) width. One of the two works was exhibited at the Paris Salon in 1886 no. 1957 and again at the 1889 Paris World Fair. Rallis represented Greece at the Paris World Fair along with 16 other Greek artists and was awarded the Silver medal. The official name and location of the fair was Exposition Universelle des Beaux-Arts, Palais du Champ de Mars no. 32. Historians believe the current work was completed in situ during the painter's trip to Mount Athos in 1885, while the Salon version was completed at the painter's Paris studio. Subtle differences exist between the two works, with a distinction apparent in the architecture and the arrangement of the figures. Not much is known about what happened to either work. Up until 2007, the work was in a private collection in Normandy, France. The painting was last sold for 126,500 GBP on November 14, 2007, at a London, UK, auction known as The Greek Sale hosted by Sotheby's.

== Description ==
The work was made with oil paint on canvas and has dimensions of 29.2 cm (11.4 in) height and 40.5 cm (15.9 in) width. The painting was completed in 1885 and represents a dining room in the Sacred Patriarchal and Stauropegic Monastery Esphigmenou known as a refectory on Mount Athos. A priest stands in front of an analogion, reading the typical sermon during meal time for the monks. Eight priests are eating their meals in a room decorated with fresco and Eastern Orthodox themes. The priests each wear the black under or inner cassock, known as the anderi, and the outer cassock, known as exorasson, along with the cylindrical Orthodox priest hat known as the kalimavkion. Black symbolizes death to the world and dedication to God, and worldly things left behind. The room is filled with carpets, while a small carpet under the priest to our right, sitting by himself, features orientalist themes. The chandeliers feature oil lamps typical of the period. The work was signed by the painter Ralli.

== Gallery ==
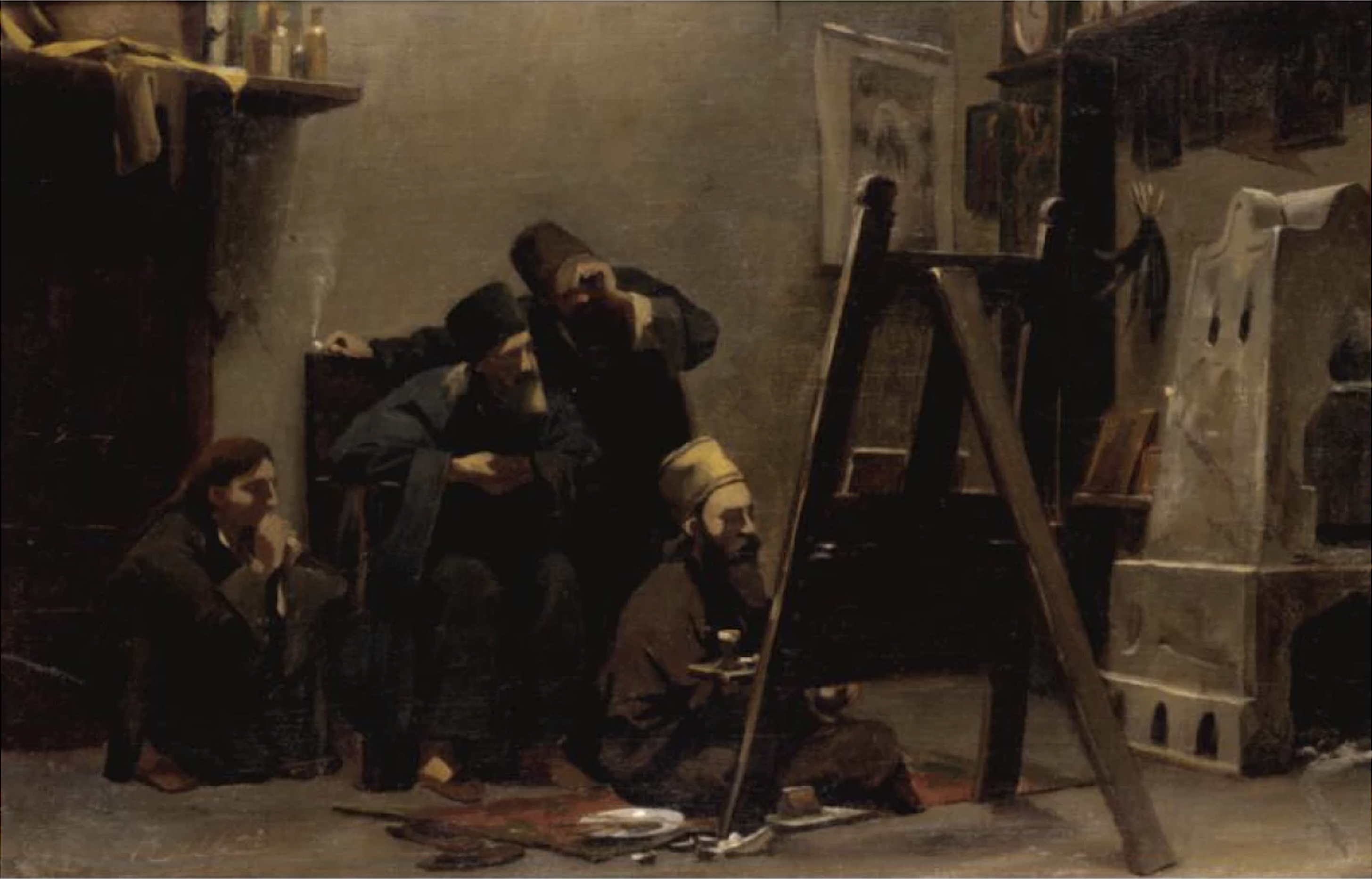
Icon Painter on Mount Athos, c. (1885-1887)

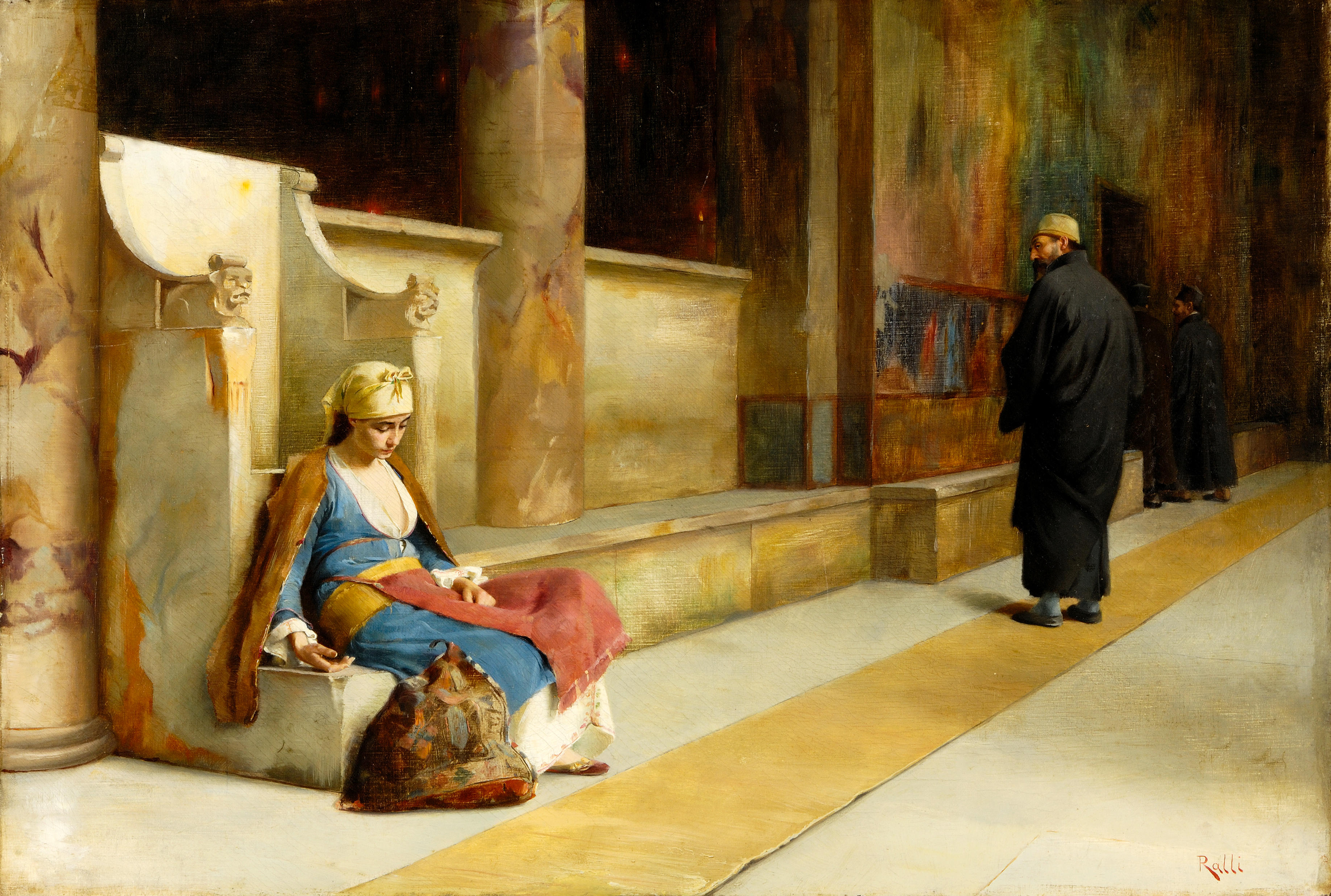
Resting In A Greek Monastery, c. (1873-1894)

=== Orthodox Church Themes ===
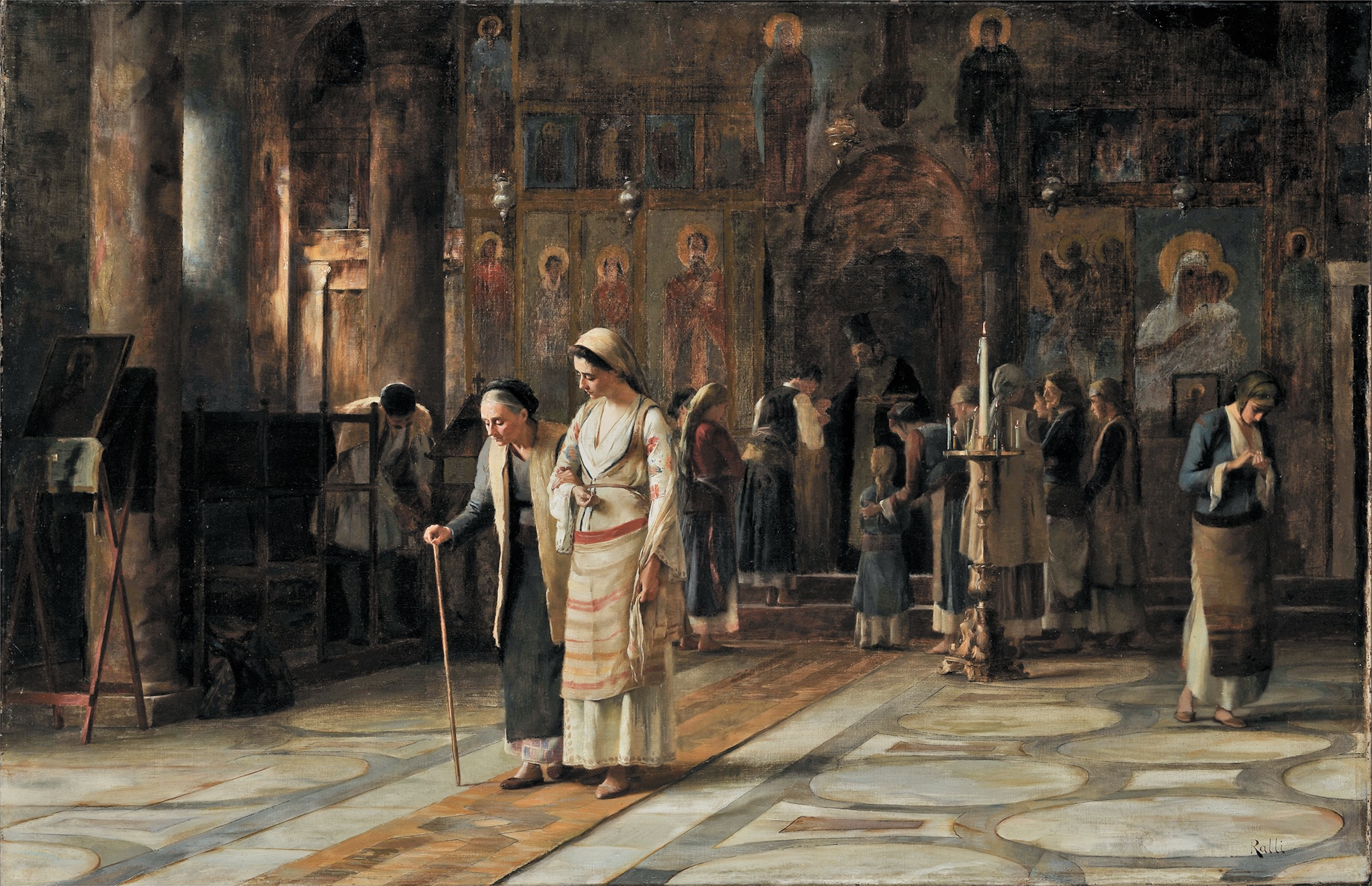
After the Service c. 1873-1909

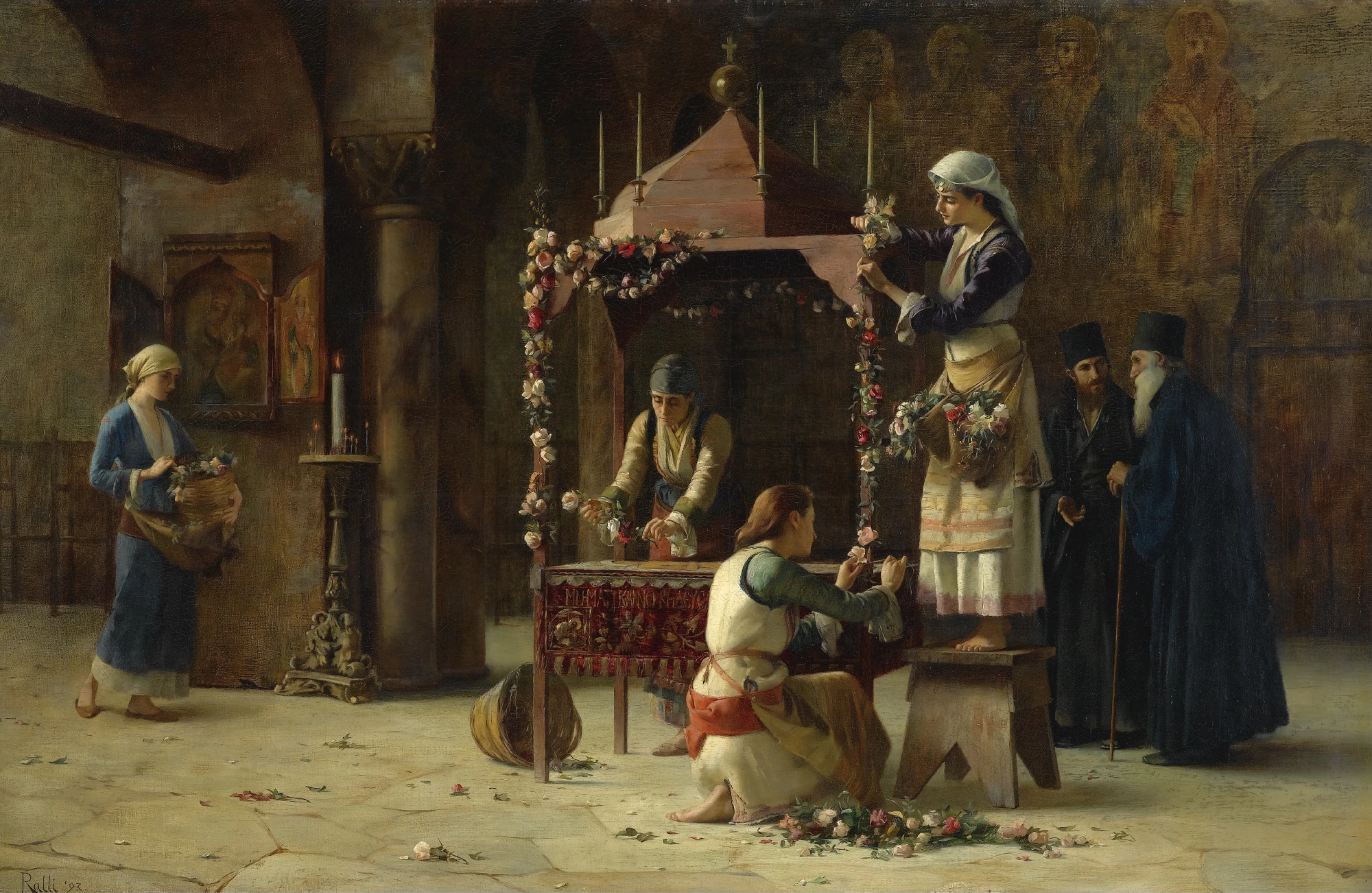
Holy Friday, Greece c. 1893

== Bibliography ==
- Palioura, Maria Mirka (2008). Το ζωγραφικό έργο του Θεόδωρου Ράλλη (1852-1909): πηγές έμπνευσης - οριενταλιστικά θέματα [The Work of the Painter Theodoros Rallis (1852-1909): Sources of Inspiration - Orientalist Themes] (Thesis) (in Greek). Athens, Greece: University of Athens. doi:10.12681/eadd/22456.
- Salahi, Katherine (2011). Knowledge is Light: Travellers in the Near East Theodore Ralli’s Diary on his Travel to Athos (1885). Oakville, CT: Oxbow Books. doi:10.2307/j.ctvh1dwhn.13.
- Palioura, Mirka Α. (December 14, 2014). "Theodoros Ralli Looking East" (PDF). Athens, Greece: Benaki Museum. Archived (PDF) from the original on September 11, 2025.
- Dumas, F. G. (1889). Exposition Universelle De 1889 Catalogue Illustre Des Beaux-Arts 1789-1889 [Universal Exposition of 1889: Illustrated Catalogue of Fine Arts 1789–1889] (in French). Paris, France: Published by L. Danel, Printer-Publisher.
- Montaiglon, Anatole (1886). Explication des ouvrages de peinture, sculpture, architecture, gravure, et lithographie des artistes vivants [Explanation of Works of Painting, Sculpture, Architecture, Engraving, and Lithography by Living Artists] (in French). Paris, France: Paul Dupont Publisher.
- Marbeau, Edouard (1886). Revue française de l'étranger et des colonies et l'exploration Volume 3 1886 [French Review of Foreign Affairs, the Colonies, and Exploration Volume 3, 1886 commentary by P. Chassaigne de Néronde] (in French). Paris, France: Central Railway Printing and Bookshop and Chaix Printing Works.
