= The Weavers, Arachova =

Painting by Théodore Jacques Ralli

- Les Tisseuses dans le village d'Arachova (French)
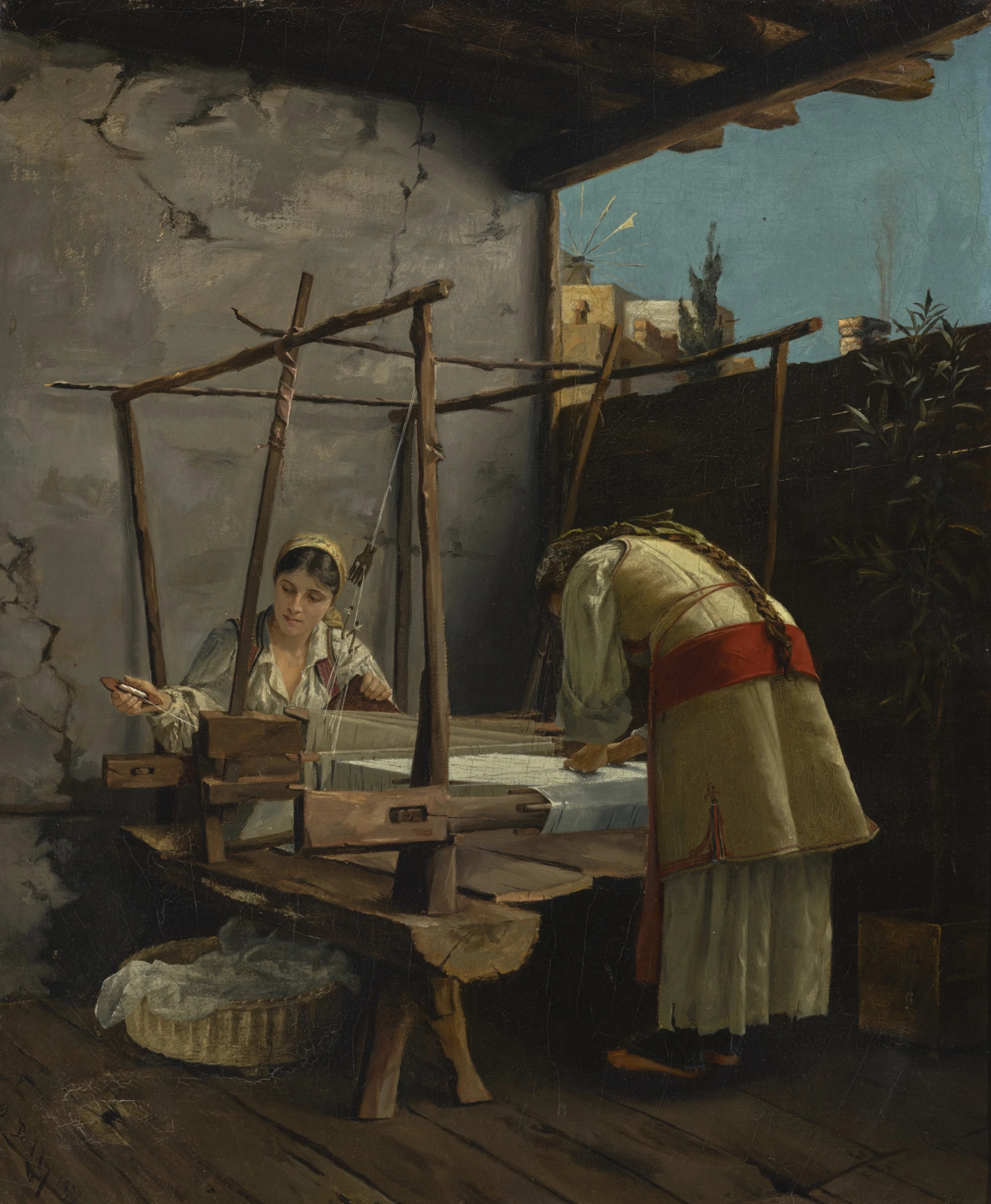
- Artist: Théodore Jacques Ralli
- Year: c. 1877
- Medium: Oil on canvas
- Movement: French School; Greek Everyday Life
- Subject: Two women weaving on a loom in Arachova
- Dimensions: 55 cm × 46 cm (21.6 in × 18.1 in)
- Owner: Private Collector

The Weavers, Arachova. is an oil painting created by Greek-French painter Théodore Jacques Ralli. Ralli is known for creating works portraying women weaving, doing laundry, spinning, creating palm crosses, producing rose jam, peeling apples, and tending to sheep in a setting of everyday Greek life. The artist attained notoriety in Greece after his work I'm Going to Correct You (Je vais vous corriger) was accepted at the prestigious, world-renowned Paris Salon in 1875. The painter was part of the family known as the Ralli Brothers. The family-owned and operated businesses all over the world with headquarters in London. In April 1876, the painter traveled to Greece to visit Thebes, Arachova, and other parts of Central Greece, which inspired his works. Rallis was also acquainted with other Greek painters active during the same period, such as Georgios Jakobides, Nikiforos Lytras, Iakovos Rizos, and Nikolaos Gyzis. His Greek contemporaries also painted vignettes of Greek everyday life. While visiting Greece in 1876, the painter also visited an art exhibition at the National Technical University of Athens. Throughout his career, Ralli would go on to feature small Greek village life in his works.

Small villages of Greece typically produce handcrafted traditional products. Lesvos is known for Ouzo, while Chios is known for Mastika. Arachova is known for its handcrafted weaving. The local village women produce bed covers, rugs, and other household linens. Rallis immortalized the local Greek women of the 19th century by painting local weavers and spinners. Weaving and spinning are integral components of the textile industry. Spinning includes twisting raw fibers together, such as cotton and wool, to create yarn, and the output of spinning is woven into cloth or fabric. Ralli chose the village of Arachova due to its connection to the ancient Greek site, Mount Parnassus. Mount Parnassus was home to the muses and the ancient Greek god Apollo, who were inspirational to the fine arts. The work is also a testimony to Ralli's output of paintings capturing Greek everyday life. The Weavers, Arachova and Praying in a Greek Church, Mount Parnassus are the painter's earliest works about small Greek villages. Both works were submitted to the Paris Salon in 1877.

One of the best-known works about weaving was completed by Diego Velázquez in 1657, entitled Las Hilanderas (The Spinners). The story is about the fable of Arachne and the Greek goddess Athena. Other artists, such as Telemaco Signorini featured weavers in the small Italian village of Settignano. The work was completed in 1881 and called Straw Weavers at Settignano attesting to Italian everyday life in the late 19th century. The Girl by Georgios Jakobides, completed in 1876, and The Spinner, by Polychronis Lembesis completed in 1892, feature spinning in Greek everyday life. Rallis also completed more works featuring spinning. One such work was Woman Spinning completed in 1890. The Weavers, Arachova is held in a private collection and was last sold in London in 2018 for 31,250 pounds.

== History ==
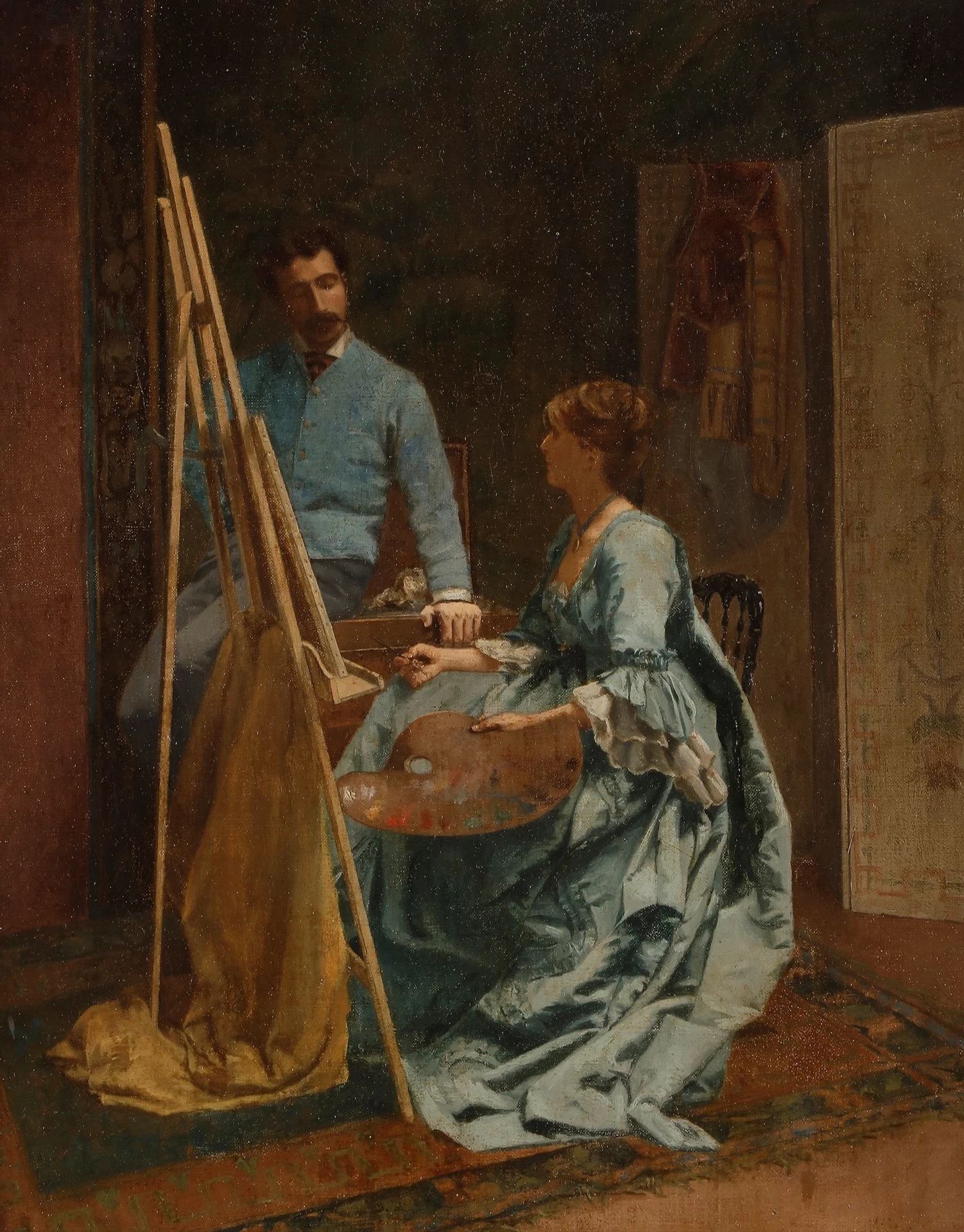
I Will Correct You

After Ralli's success at the prestigious Paris Salon exhibition in 1875 with his work I'm Going to Correct You (Je vais vous corriger). The artist wanted to focus on works featuring his Greek heritage. With a large portion of his works featuring the villages of Arachova and Megara, it is evident that the painter painted the villages surrounding Mount Parnassus. Mount Parnassus was the site where the muses and Apollo resided. The ancient Greek deities were significant to the fine arts, and Rallis clearly relays his desire to incorporate the location in his works as if they are guiding his paintbrush.

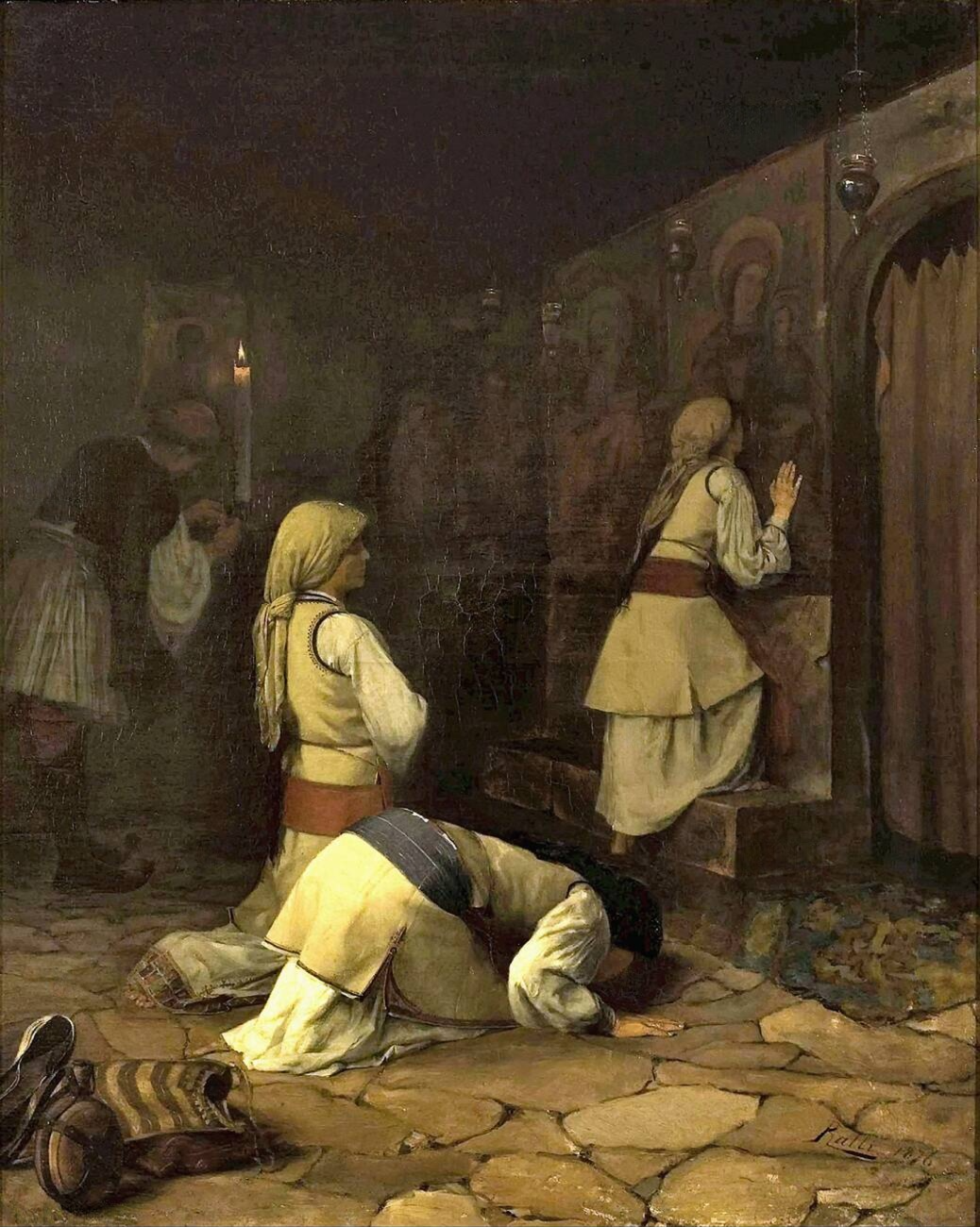
Praying in a Greek church, Mount Parnassus

The Greek town of Arachova is located on the southern portion of Mount Parnassos. Greece celebrated the artist by publishing multiple articles about his success in Paris, France in 1875. After his visit to Arachova in April of 1876, the painter submitted two works featuring Greek everyday life to the prestigious Paris Salon exhibition in 1877. One work featured Mount Parnassus, and the other Arachova. The works he submitted were Praying in a Greek Church, Mount Parnassus and The Weavers, Arachova. The works were presented on May 1, 1877, at the Paris Salon held at the Grand Palais des Champs-Élysées in the Palais de l'Industrie building. The exhibition lasted from May until the end of June. Not much is known about who purchased the works. Burr and Emily Wendell, of Cazenovia, New York, were briefly the owners of The Weavers, Arachova, which was then sold to the great-grandfather of the seller in 2018. An auction was held on December 12, 2018, in London called 19th Century European Paintings at Sothebys and the work sold for 31,250 GBP to a private collector.

== Description ==
The painting was created with oil paint on canvas and was completed after Ralli's trip to Arachova in 1877. The height is 55 cm (21.6 in) and the width is 46 cm (18.1 in). The work is a precursor to many works that follow, representing working Greek women in small Greek villages. The two women wear traditional clothing of Greece, along with the Greek mandili headscarf. The small room has an opening where part of the village of Arachova can be seen to our right. The painter accurately portrays the small room with a wooden roof and floor. The cracked cement wall accentuates the humble setting, adding organic warmth, depth, and character. Both women are manually operating a loom. The machine interlaces two sets of threads at right angles, known as shedding, picking, and battening. The woman closest to the cement wall is near the warp beam while she is picking the weft thread, holding a shuttle in her right hand, expressing urgency. The woman in the foreground, bent over slightly, is near the cloth beam as the newly formed fabric comes out. She adjusts the beater, pushing the newly laid weft thread against previously woven cloth. The artist clearly depicts the finished fabric. A small potted plant is also to our right. The painter signed and dated the work in the lower left-hand corner Ralli 1877.

== Gallery ==
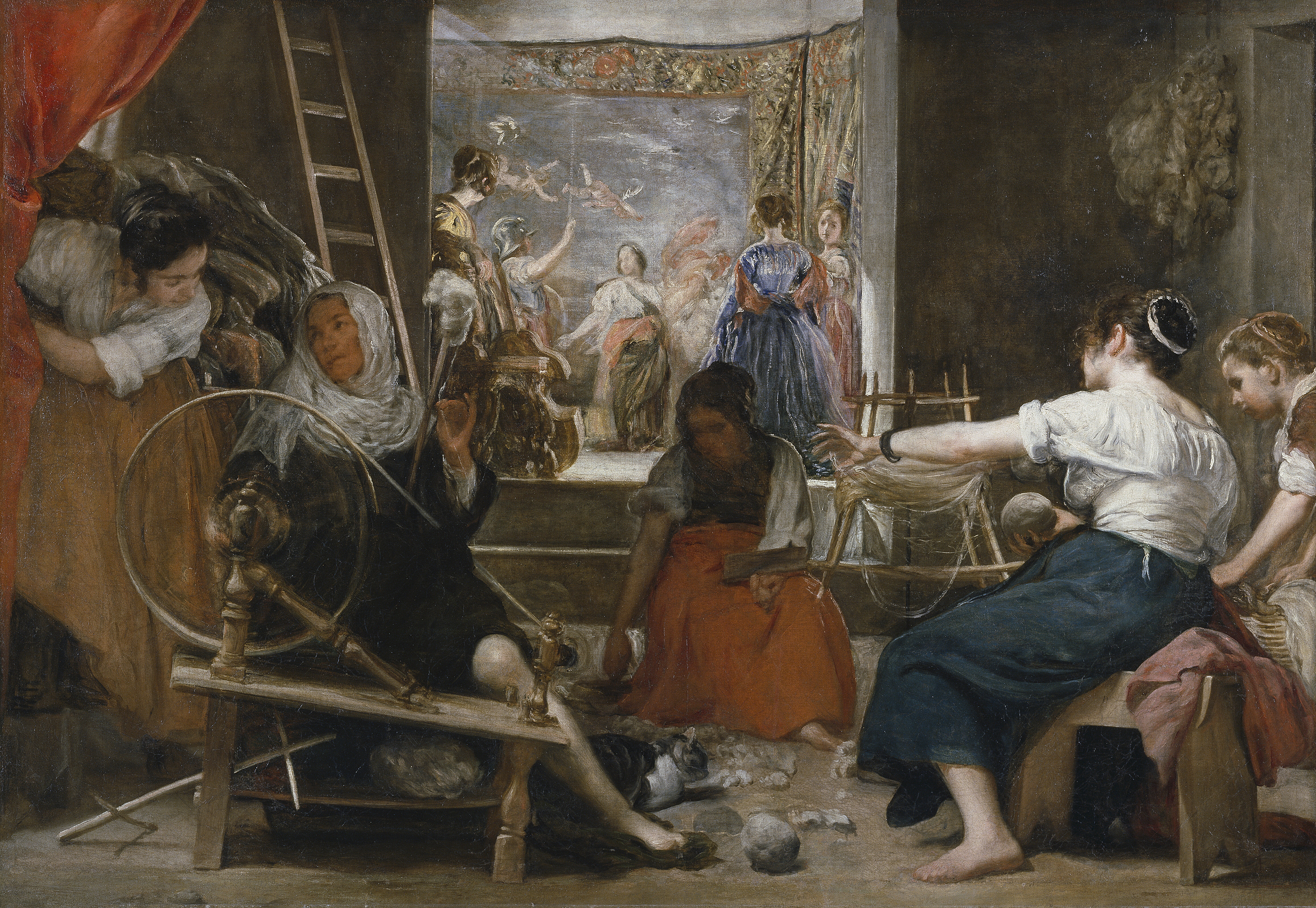
The Spinners, or, The Fable of Arachne, by Diego Velázquez c. 1657

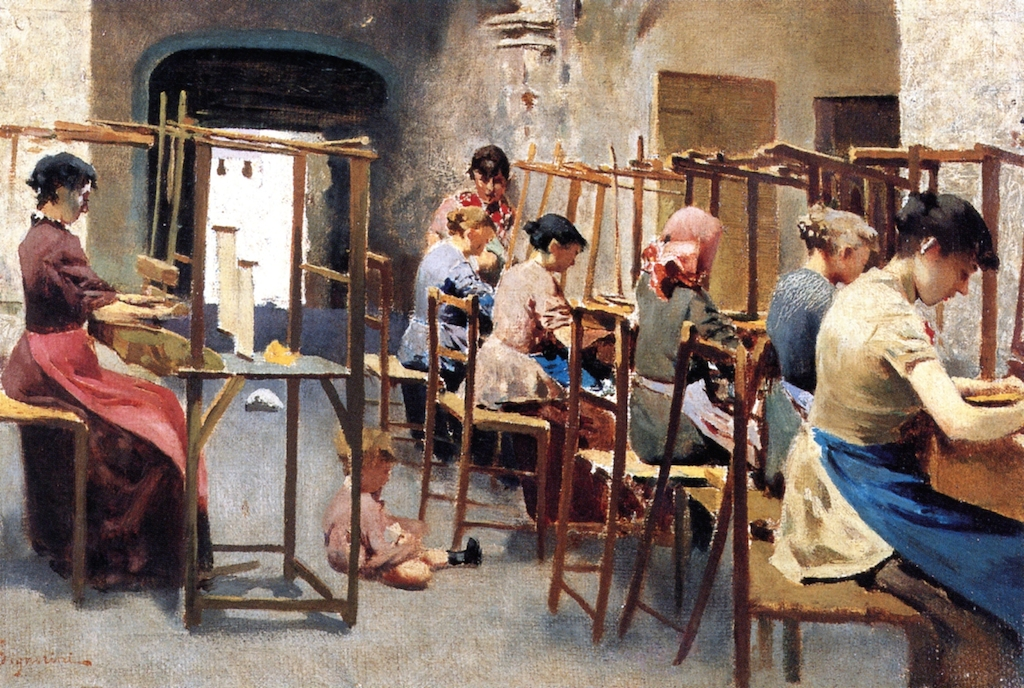
Straw weavers at Settignano by Telemaco Signorini c. 1881

=== Paintings of spinning in Greek everyday life ===
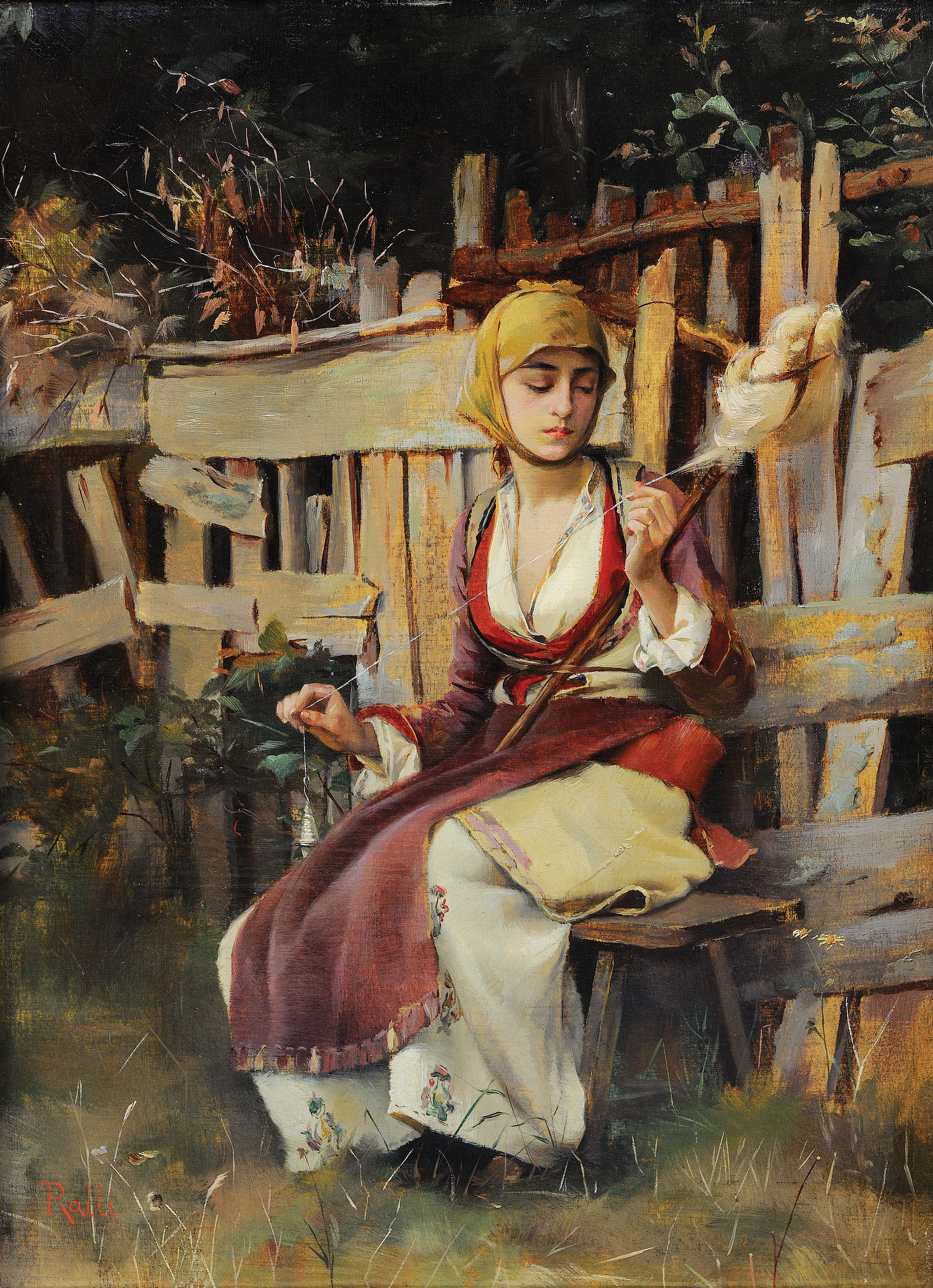
Woman Spinning

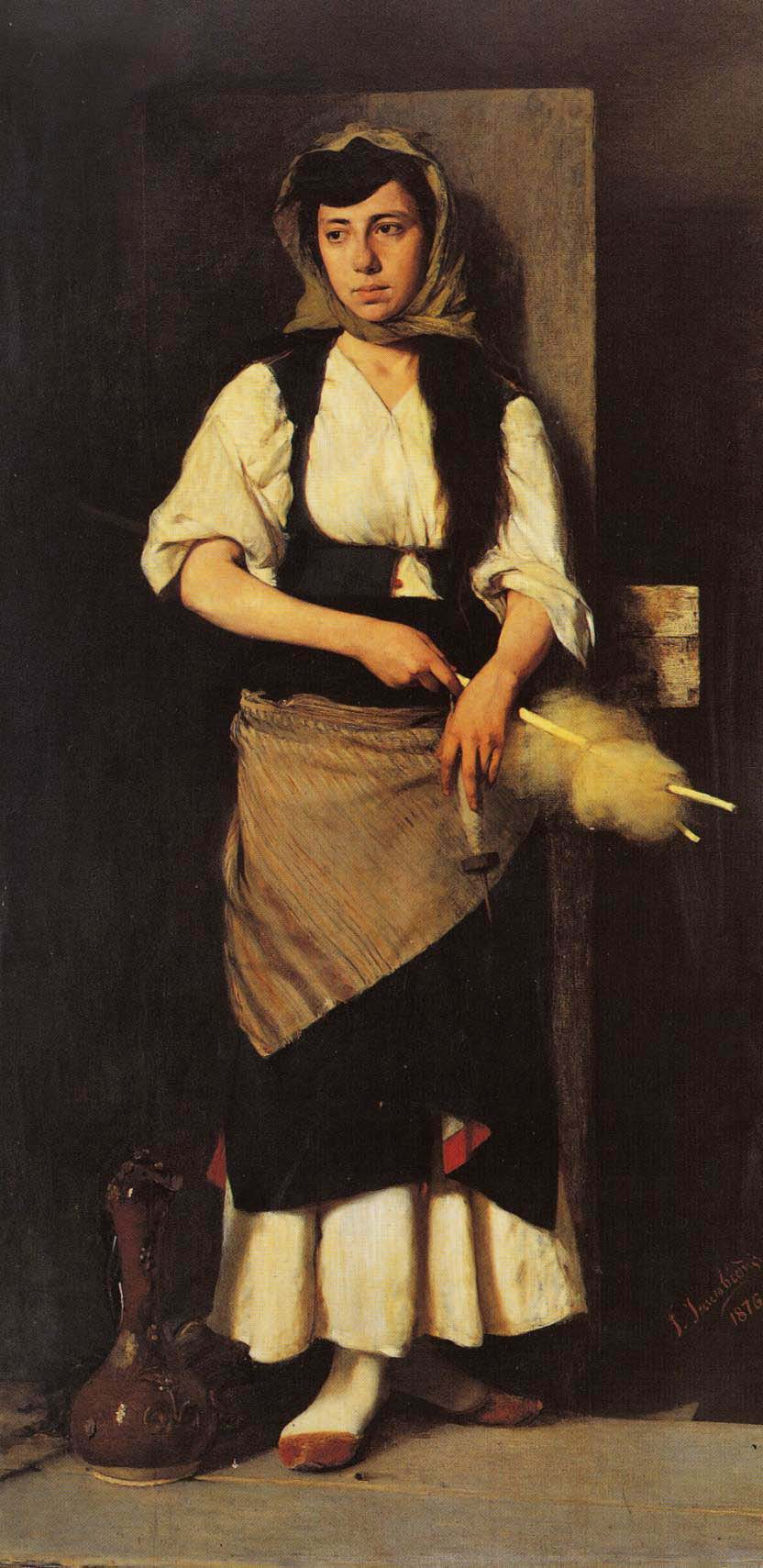
The Girl by Georgios Jakobides c. 1876

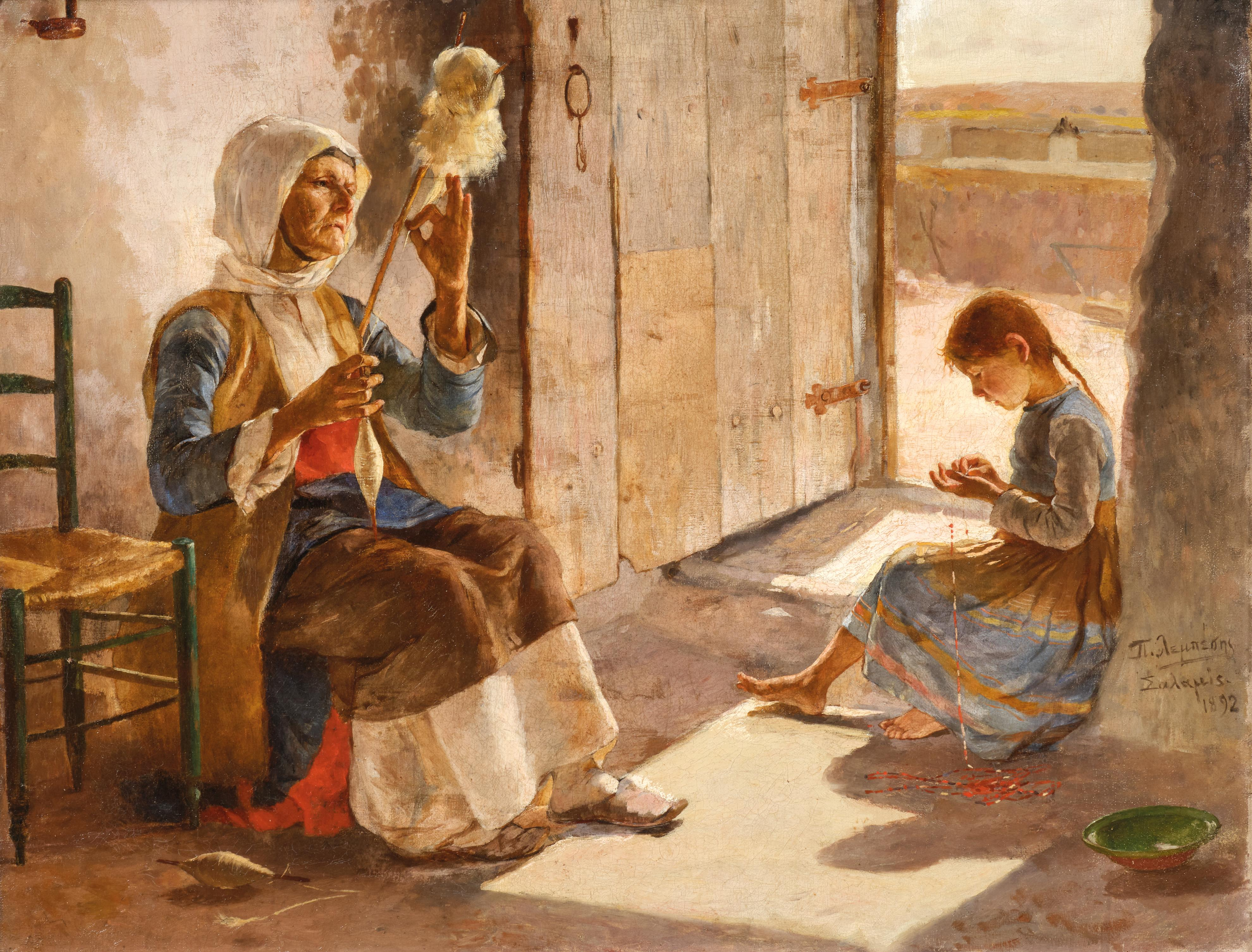
The Spinner by Polychronis Lembesis c. 1892

== Bibliography ==
- Palioura, Maria Mirka (2008). Το ζωγραφικό έργο του Θεόδωρου Ράλλη (1852-1909): πηγές έμπνευσης - οριενταλιστικά θέματα [The Work of the Painter Theodoros Rallis (1852-1909): Sources of Inspiration - Orientalist Themes] (Thesis) (in Greek). Athens, Greece: University of Athens. doi:10.12681/eadd/22456.
- McElroy, Neil H. (1959). A Pocket Guide to Greece. Washington D.C.: United States Printing Office.
- Dixon, Susan M (2006). Between the Real and the Ideal the Accademia Degli Arcadi and its Garden in Eighteenth-century Rome. Newark, Delaware: University of Delaware Press. ISBN 9780874139372.
- Waddington, William (1877). Explication des Ouvrages de Peinture, Sculpture, Architecture, Gravure Et Lithographie des Artistes Vivants Exposés au Palais des Champs-Élysées le 1er Mai 1877 [Explanation of the Works of Painting, Sculpture, Architecture, Engraving and Lithography by Living Artists Exhibited at the Palais des Champs-Élysées on May 1, 1877] (in French). Paris, France: Imprimerie Nationale.
- Véron, Pierre (1875). Salon de 1875 A De l'art et des artistes de mon temps Par Pierre Véron Deuxième Édition [Salon of 1875 A On the Art and Artists of My Time By Pierre Véron Second Edition] (in French). Paris, France: The Henri Oudin Bookstore Poitiers.
- Palioura, Mirka Α. (December 14, 2014). "Theodoros Ralli Looking East" (PDF). Athens, Greece: Benaki Museum. Archived (PDF) from the original on September 11, 2025.
