= Holy Friday, Greece =

Painting by Théodore Jacques Ralli

- Le Vendredi-Saint Grèce (French)
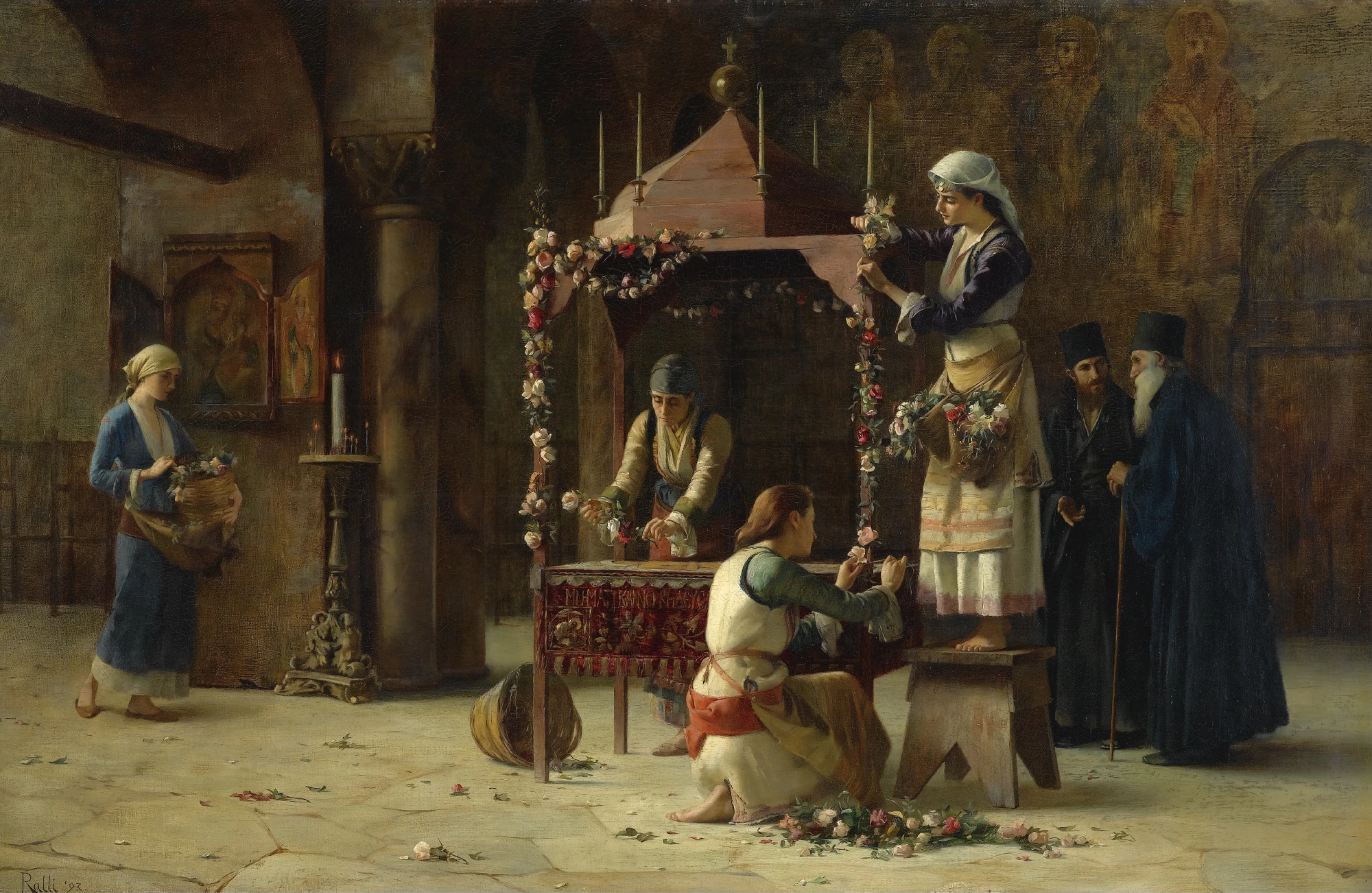
- Artist: Théodore Jacques Ralli
- Year: c. 1893
- Medium: Oil on canvas
- Movement: French School; Greek Everyday Life
- Subject: Holy Friday, Greece
- Dimensions: 66 cm × 100 cm (25.9 in × 39.3 in)
- Location: Possibly London
- Owner: Private Collector

Holy Friday, Greece is a painting created by Turkish-born Greek-French painter Théodore Ralli. Ralli was part of the well-known Ralli family and was also married twice. His wife's family names were Mavrokordatos and Mavromichalis. Rallis created a sizeable amount of paintings representing traditional Greek everyday life. In the early 1890s, Rallis maintained an address at 6 Rue Aumont-Thiéville in Paris, France, and spent his winters in Cairo, Egypt, from 1890 to 1904. There was a sizable Greek community in Cairo, and Rallis also befriended the ruling royal family. He was awarded the Order of the Medjidie by the Khedivate of Egypt. Rallis obtained special permission from the Greek Ministry of Foreign Affairs to wear his award while visiting Athens, Greece. In Cairo, Rallis was the president of an organizing committee to establish a French-style salon exhibition in the country in 1891. The Khedive Tewfik Pasha reigned from 1879 to January 1892, and his eldest son, Abbas II of Egypt, reigned from January 1892 to December 1914; both leaders were directly involved with the Cairo salon. The opening of the first Cairo salon was presided over by the Khedive on February 20, 1891, in the presence of the diplomatic corps. At this exhibition, Rallis presented one of his works featuring Greek everyday life entitled The Palms in Megara. By 1893, the Cairo Salon had become an annual event, and Holy Friday, Greece was exhibited.

Praying in a Greek Church, Mount Parnassus is one of Ralli's earliest known works featuring Greek everyday life. The work was completed in 1876. Works such as The Weavers, Arachova, 1877, Young Mother from Megara, 1878, and Rose Jams in Megara, 1892 all depict Greek everyday life. A large number of his Greek works are affiliated with the sacred mountain known as Mount Parnassus, which is deeply rooted in the history and culture of Greece. The mountain was home to the muses of poetry, music, and learning, and was also associated with the Greek God Apollo, who was the god of music, poetry, and fine arts. In 1885, Rallis traveled to another holy mountain known as Mount Athos, where he drew inspiration for his work. The artist stayed fifteen days. Mount Athos features a massive complex of Greek monasteries and is over one thousand years old. The location is very important to the Greek people as the sacred pillar of the Greek Orthodox Church.

Rallis completed a significant number of paintings featuring Greek everyday life within Greek Orthodox churches. His first work in a Greek church was Praying in a Greek Church, Mount Parnassus in 1876. Most of his works of Greek everyday life within Greek churches feature: traditional clothing of Greece, icons, frescos, icon corners, candelabra, sanctuary lamps, burning candles, analogion, kliros, and iconostasis. In 1885, the painter completed Refectory in a Greek Monastery a work directly inspired by his visit to Mount Athos. Nikolaos Gyzis (1842 - 1901) was another Greek painter who was committed to creating works featuring Greek everyday life. He traveled to Greece in the 1870s and painted Greek themes. One such work is the Step Mother completed around 1883. Gyzis employs similar themes to Rallis, featuring icons and similar interiors. Other Greek contemporaries, such as Georgios Jakobides (1853–1932), completed Le bouquet, and Polychronis Lembesis (1848–1913) completed Young Girl with Local Costume, and Nikiforos Lytras (1832–1904) completed The Waiting featuring Greek everyday life. Loukas Geralis, Apostolos Geralis, and Vasos Germenis were Greek artists of the 20th century influenced by Greek everyday life and reflected it in their works. Interestingly, Loukas Geralis, Apostolos Geralis, and Georgios Jakobides were from the Greek island of Lesvos. Holy Friday, Greece can be found in a private collection.

== History ==
While living in Cairo, Egypt, Rallis helped organize an exhibition, entitled the Cairo Salon. During its formation, Rallis was president of the organizing committee to establish the French-style salon. The event was eventually held every year around February, and Rallis had a close relationship with the leadership of Egypt, known as the Khedivate of Egypt. The Khedive took part in the Salon of Egypt, and by February 1893, Rallis exhibited his work Holy Friday, Greece in the mansion of the artistic club (cercle artistique). Rallis called the Egyptian artist club the Artistic Group 200, and that year, one hundred fifty works were exhibited.

Later that year, Holy Friday, Greece was exhibited in Paris, France, at an exhibition held by the Society of French Artists (Société des Artistes Français) starting on May 1, 1893, and ending June 30, 1893, at the Grand Palais. The show was officially called the Annual Exhibition of the Works of Living Artists. There is no information about who purchased the work. In 1935, it resurfaced and was sold in Paris, France. The work was sold in 2008 by the grandson of the 1935 purchaser at a Sotheby's auction in London on November 22, 2010, for 397,250 pounds, about 639,572 dollars.

== Description ==
The height is 60 cm (23.6 in) and the width is 81.5 cm (32 in), and it is an oil painting on canvas completed in 1893. The subjects are inside a Greek Orthodox church. Three women are decorating furniture symbolizing Christ's wooden bier called the kouvouklion with flowers, candles, and the cloth known as the epitaphios, which is an iconographic cloth depicting the dead body of Christ. After the furniture is completely decorated, it is also referred to as the epitaphios. Another woman to our left is bringing more flowers to the sacred object. Each of the woman are wearing the traditional clothing of Greece along with the Greek mandili headscarf common in most of Ralli's works. Two Greek Orthodox priests are wearing their traditional priestly attire while discussing the epitaphios. In Greek Orthodox and Byzantine Catholic traditions, the decorated epitaphios is carried around the city on the night of Holy Friday, followed by a massive crowd, symbolizing Jesus' funeral procession. The painting also features an icon triptych, diminished frescos, and a decorative candelabra filled with burning candles within the Greek Orthodox church. The work was signed and dated by the artist in the lower left corner Ralli 93.

== Gallery ==
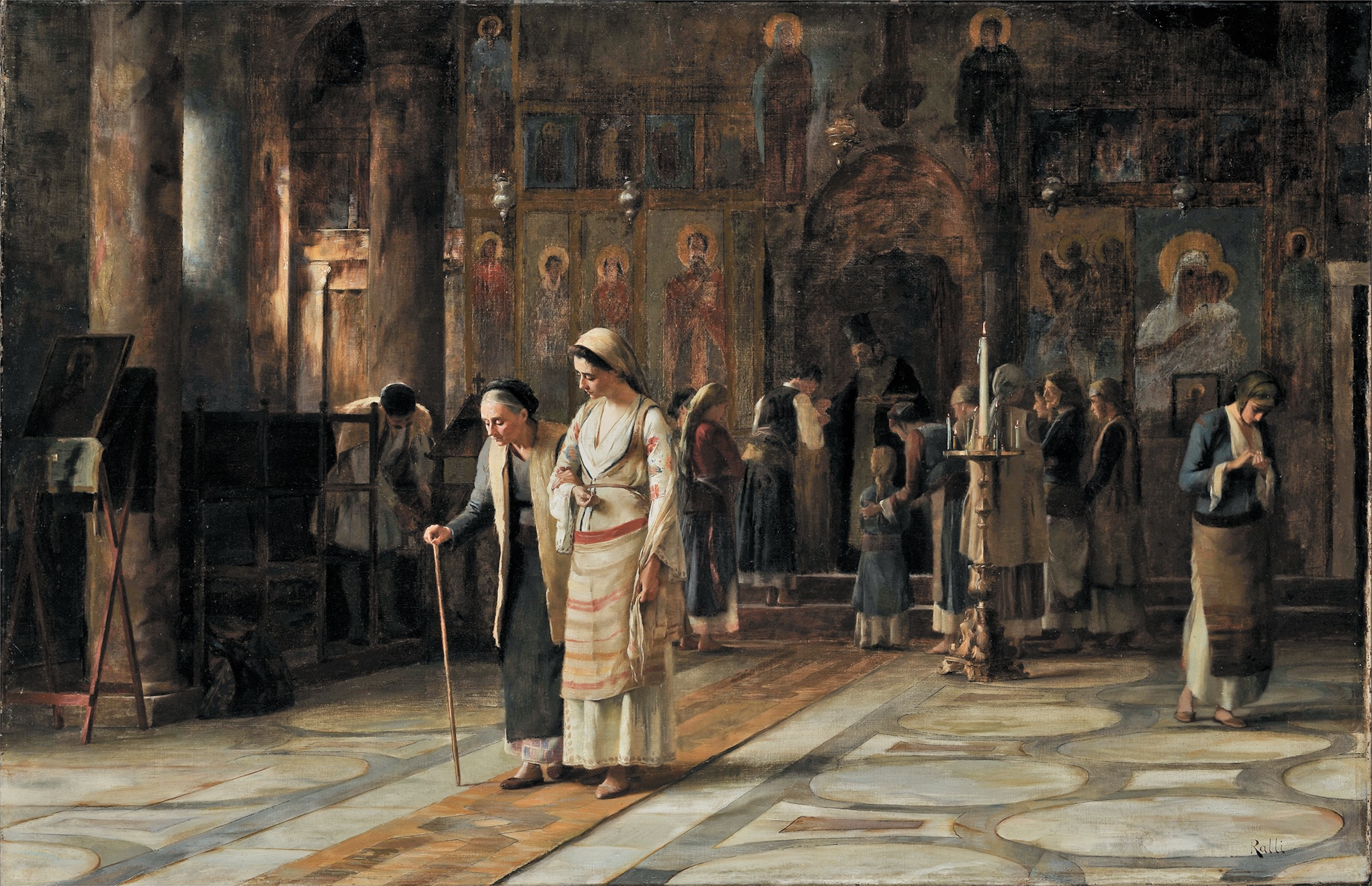
After the Service by Theodorus Rallis c. 1873–1909

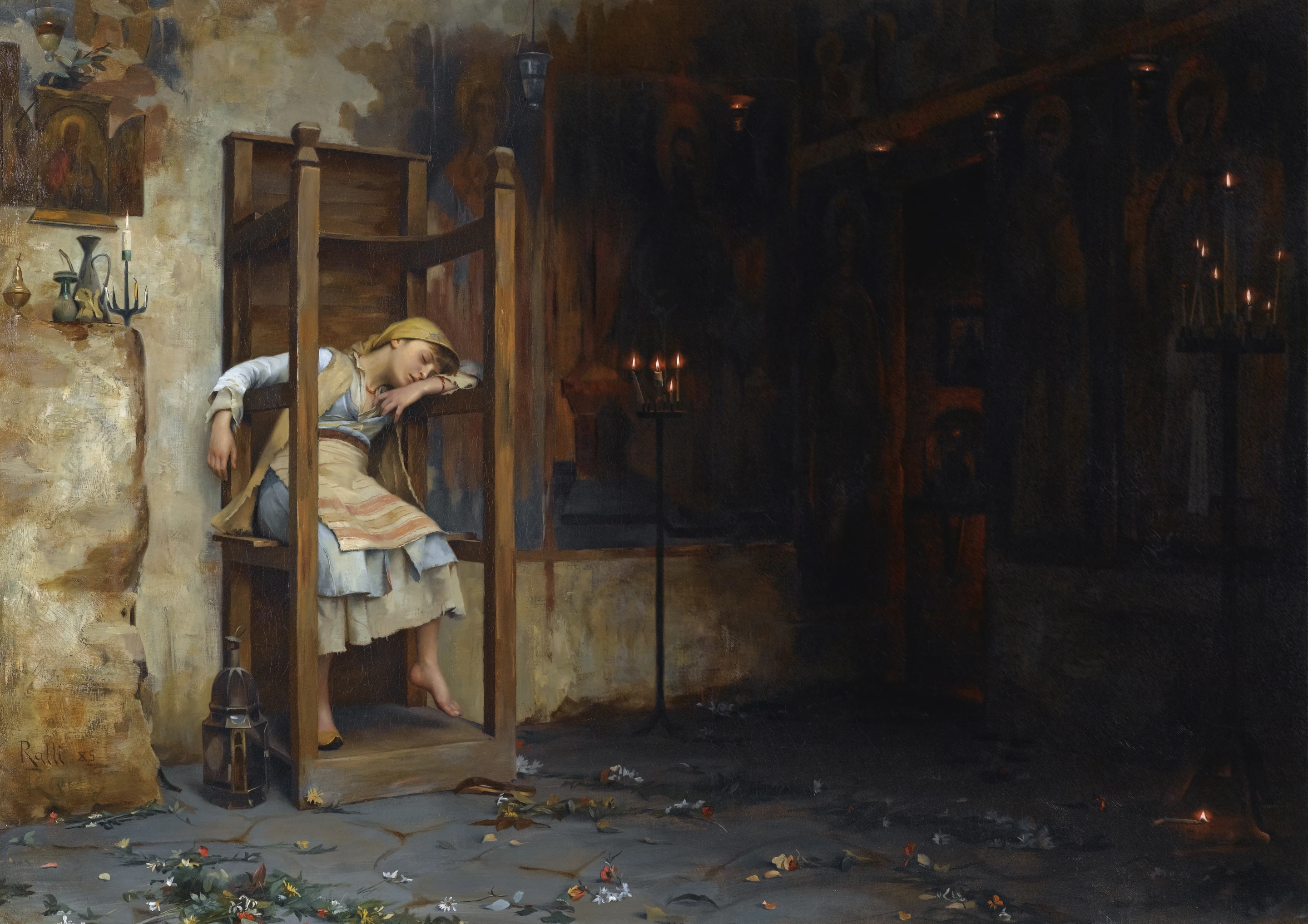
Dreaming in a Church by Theodorus Rallis c. 1885

=== Paintings of Greek Everyday Life ===
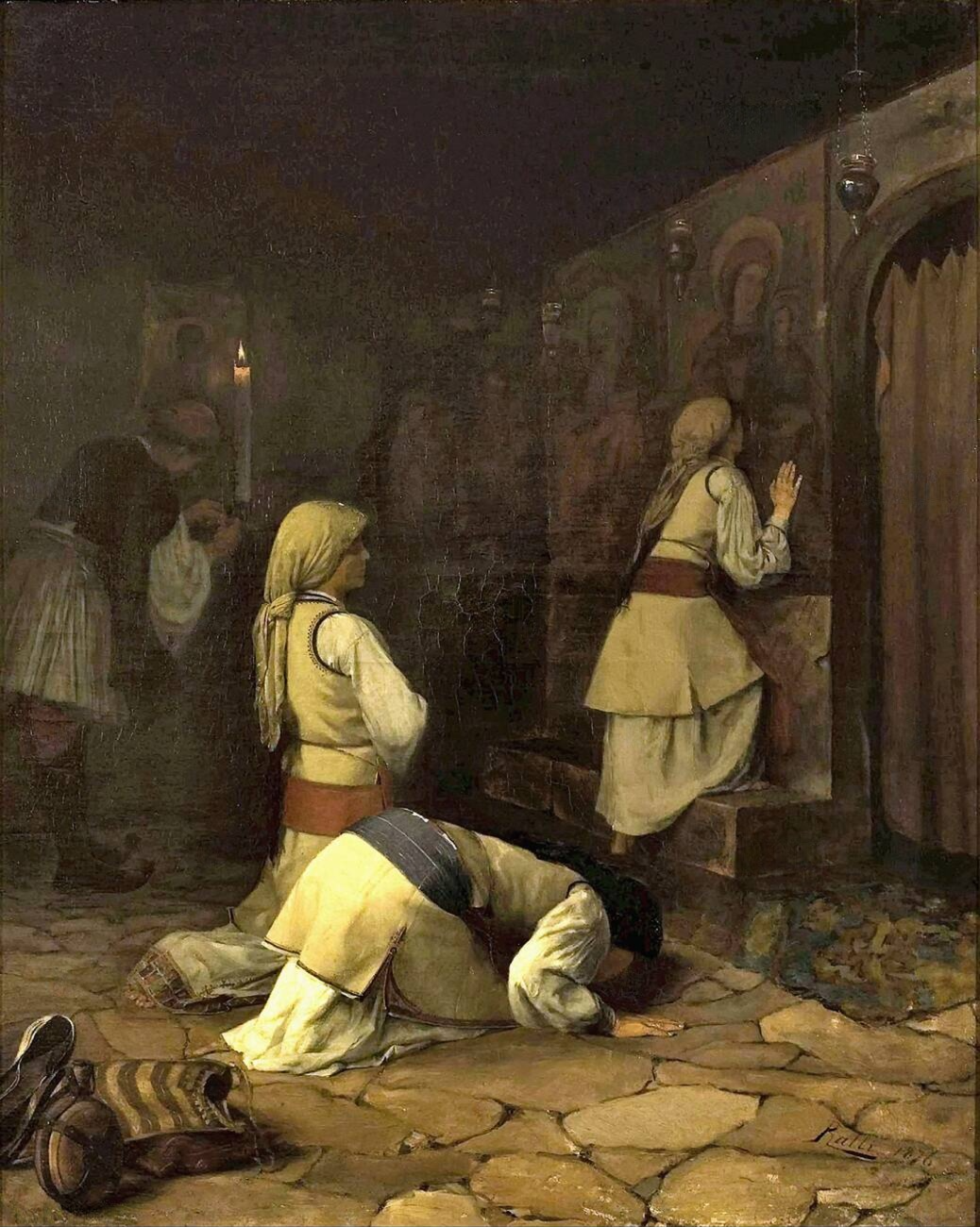
Praying in a Greek Church, Mount Parnassus by Theodorus Rallis c. 1876

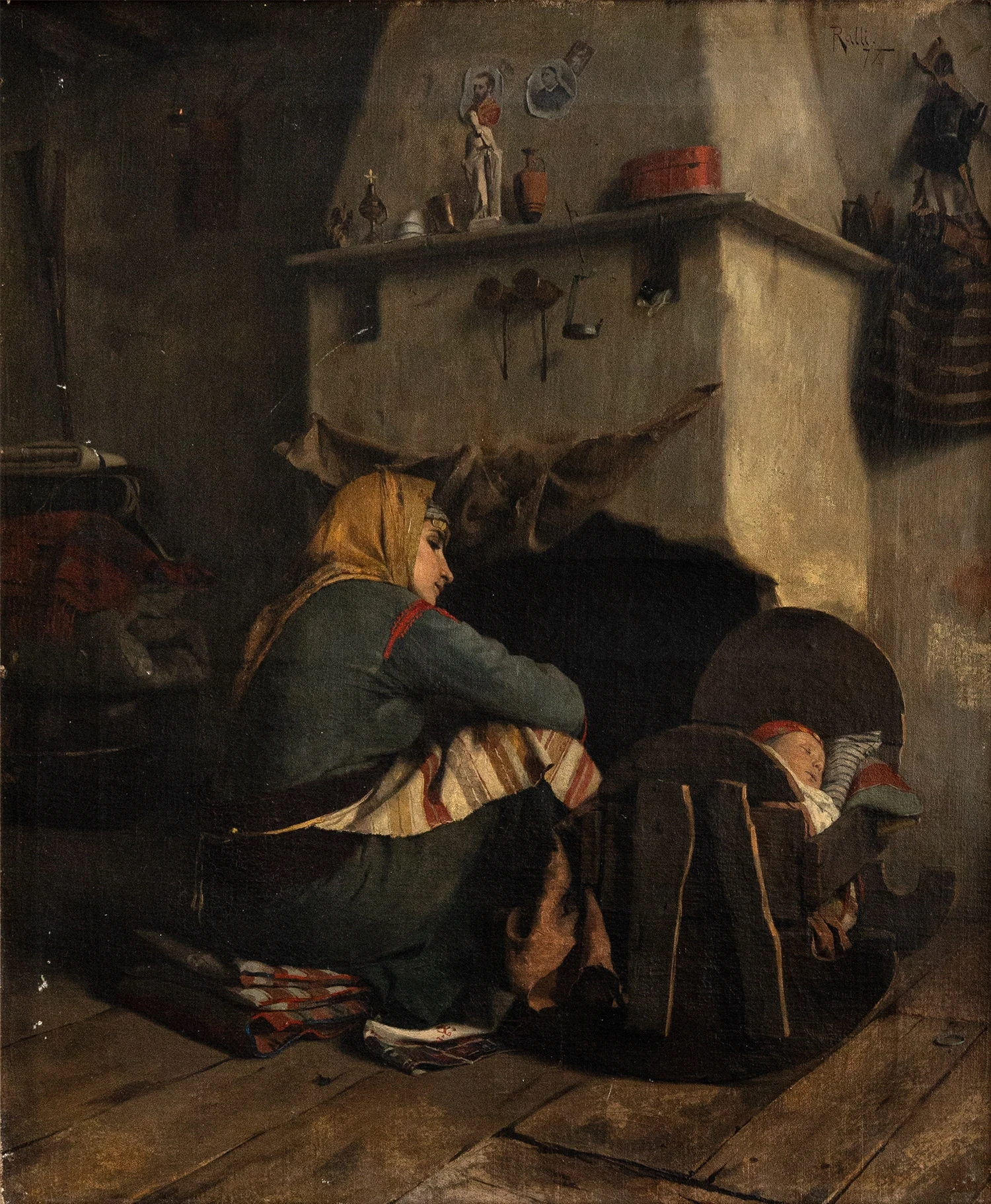
Young Mother from Megara by Theodorus Rallis c. 1878

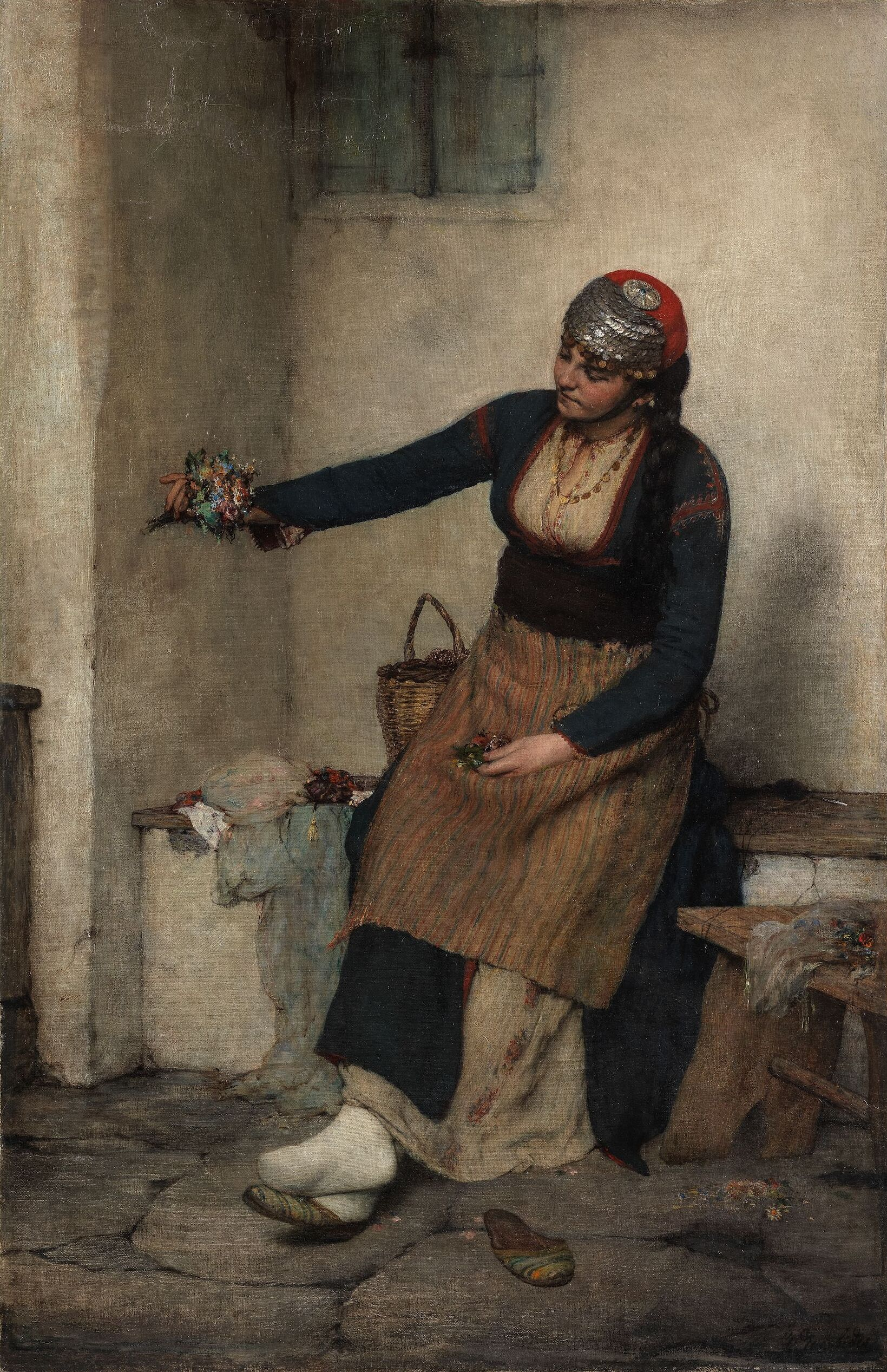
The Bouquet by Georgios Jakobides c. 1868–1932

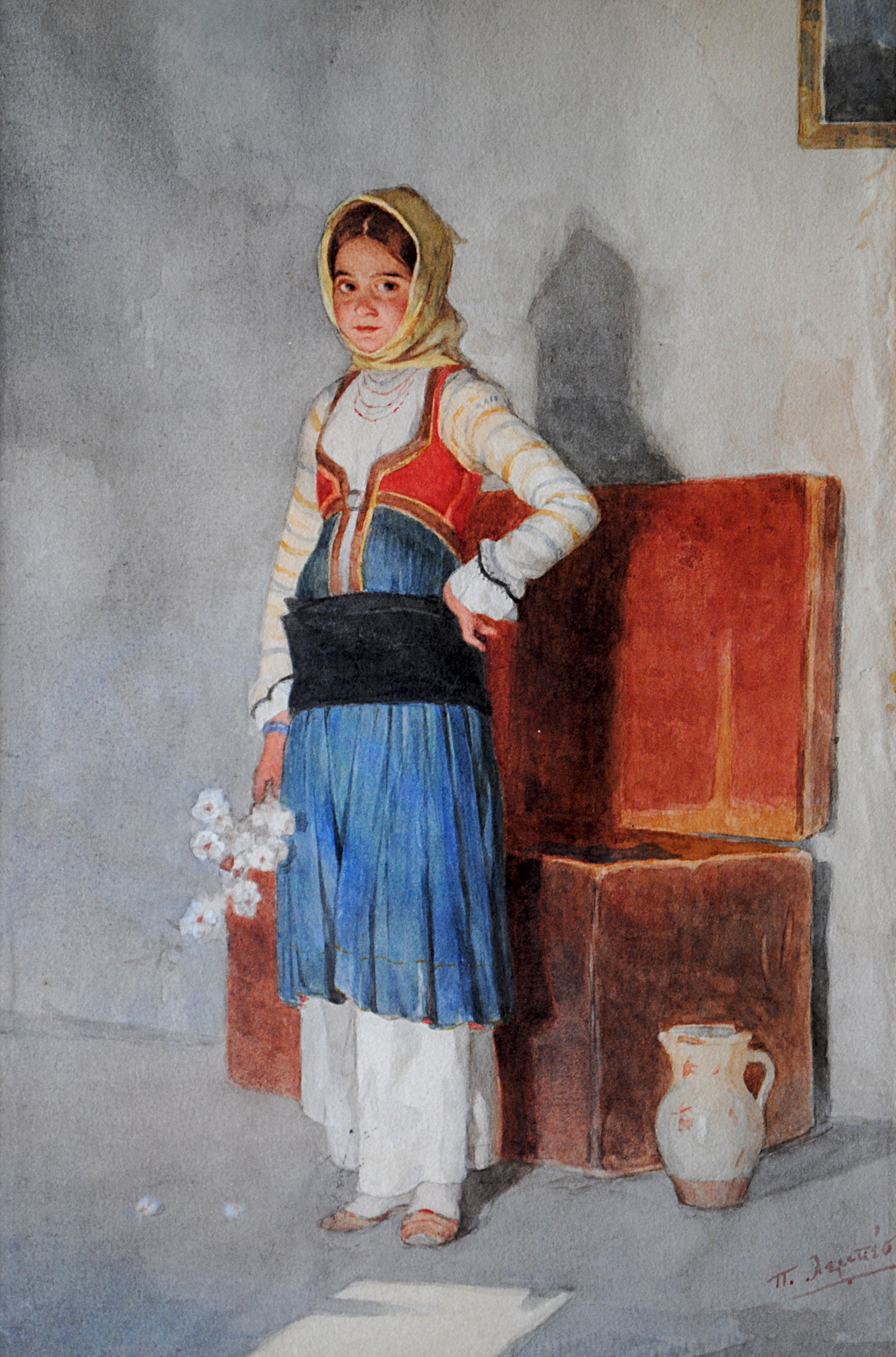
Young girl with Local Costume, by Polychronis Lembesis c. 1863–1913

== Bibliography ==
- Palioura, Maria Mirka (2008). Το ζωγραφικό έργο του Θεόδωρου Ράλλη (1852-1909): πηγές έμπνευσης - οριενταλιστικά θέματα [The Work of the Painter Theodoros Rallis (1852-1909): Sources of Inspiration - Orientalist Themes] (Thesis) (in Greek). Athens, Greece: University of Athens. doi:10.12681/eadd/22456.
- Salahi, Katherine (2011). Knowledge is Light: Travellers in the Near East Theodore Ralli’s Diary on his Travel to Athos (1885). Oakville, CT: Oxbow Books. doi:10.2307/j.ctvh1dwhn.13.
- Baschet, Ludovic (1893). Exposition des Beaux-Arts Catalogue illustré de Peinture et Sculpture Salon de 1893 [Fine Arts Exhibition Illustrated Catalogue of Painting and Sculpture Salon of 1893] (in French). Paris, France: Chamerot and Renouard.
- Beaumetz, François Dujardin (1909). Explication des Ouvrages de Peinture, Sculpture, Architecture, Gravure Et Lithographie des Artistes Vivants, Exposés au Grand Palais des Champs-Élysées:Avenue Alexandre 111 Le 1° MAI 1909 [Explanation of the Works of Painting, Sculpture, Architecture, Engraving, and Lithography by Living Artists, Exhibited at the Grand Palais des Champs-Élysées: 111 Avenue Alexandre, May 1, 1909]. Paris, France: Imprimerie Paul Dupont (Paul Dupont Printing House).
- Dixon, Susan M (2006). Between the Real and the Ideal the Accademia Degli Arcadi and its Garden in Eighteenth-century Rome. Newark, Delaware: University of Delaware Press. ISBN 9780874139372.
- Palioura, Mirka Α. (December 14, 2014). "Theodoros Ralli Looking East" (PDF). Athens, Greece: Benaki Museum. Archived (PDF) from the original on September 11, 2025.
