= Praying in a Greek Church, Mount Parnassus =

Painting by Théodore Jacques Ralli

- La prière dans une église Grecque, au Mont Parnasse (French)
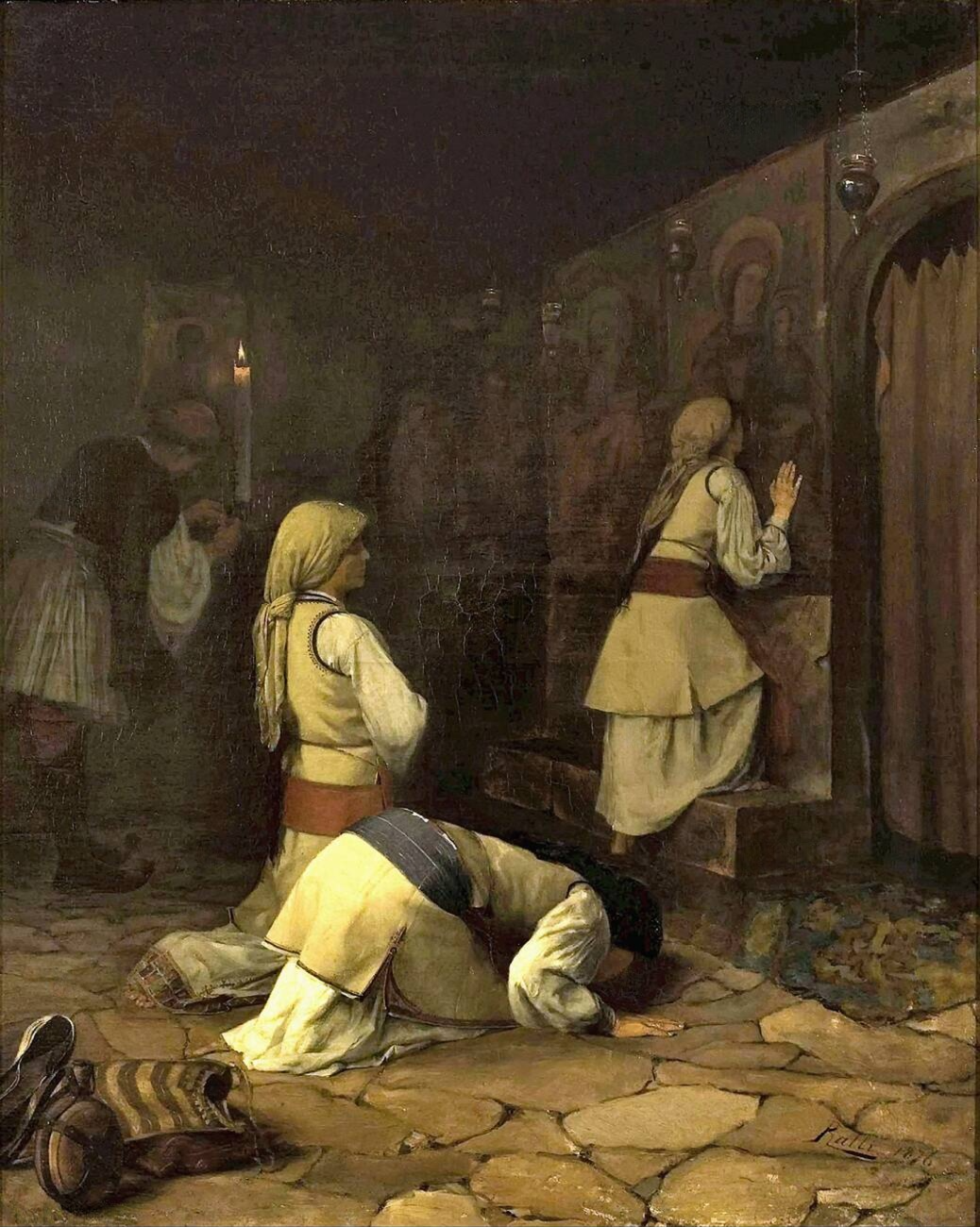
- Artist: Théodore Jacques Ralli
- Year: c. 1876
- Medium: Oil on canvas
- Movement: French School; Greek Everyday Life
- Subject: Praying in a Greek Church, at Mount Parnassus
- Dimensions: 81.3 cm × 65 cm (32 in × 25.5 in)
- Location: Possibly London
- Owner: Private Collector

Praying in a Greek Church, Mount Parnassus. is a painting created by Greek-French painter Théodore Jacques Ralli. Ralli migrated to Paris to study under Jean-Léon Gérôme and attended his workshop at Beaux-Arts de Paris in 1873. During this period, Ralli's studio address was 10 Rue de Seine, which was around the corner from the university. In May 1875, Rallis was permitted to exhibit his painting entitled I'm Going to Correct You (Je vais vous corriger) at the prestigious world-renowned Paris Salon because his work qualified. The Greek press mentioned the painter's success at the Salon. His work was also exhibited at the Fifth Liverpool Autumn Exhibition of Modern Pictures, held at the Free Public Library and Museum in Liverpool. After 1876, his second studio address was 11 Boulevard du Mont Parnasse. Rallis painted a wide assortment of works representing Greek everyday life. Praying in a Greek Church, Mount Parnassus is one of his earliest works representing Greek everyday life. The painter travelled to Greece in April 1876 to attend an art exhibition at the National Technical University of Athens and visited Thebes, Arachova, and other parts of Central Greece, which inspired his works. Ralli exhibited works representing Greek everyday life at the Paris Salon in 1877; both Praying in a Greek Church, Mount Parnassus and The Weavers, Arachova were presented.

Praying in a Greek church, Mount Parnassus, Ralli's earliest work featuring Greek everyday life, was completed in 1876. Mount Parnassus was important because it was the home of the muses, featuring poetry, music, and learning. The Greek god Apollo was also associated with the sacred mountain. He was the god of music, poetry, and fine arts. The ancient Greek location significantly impacted Rallis as a reflection of his heritage and culture. In Paris, his studio was located at 11 Boulevard du Mont Parnasse from 1876 until 1881, but he also listed his college studio address at exhibitions. The Parisian street was named after Mount Parnassus. A large assortment of his Greek works were competed in either Megara or Arachova. The Greek town of Arachova is located on the southern portion of Mount Parnassos, and the mountain is also visible from the Greek village of Megara under clear conditions. Ralli's second Greek work The Weavers, Arachova completed in 1877, was also affiliated with the sacred mountain. Rallis travelled to another holy mountain known as Mount Athos in 1885, and for fifteen days, he was inspired by numerous Greek monasteries. The holy site is over a thousand years old. The location is very important to the Greek people as the spiritual heart of the Greek Orthodox Church.

Rallis completed many works featuring Greek Orthodox churches. Praying in a Greek Church, Mount Parnassus is one of his first works about the subject matter. Most of his works feature important characteristics inherent to Greek Orthodox churches, such as the complex decorative interiors of the buildings including icons, frescos, candelabra, sanctuary lamps, burning candles, analogion, kliros, the traditional clothing of Greece, the Greek mandili headscarf, and iconostasis. In 1890, Rallis completed Praying Before the Communion at Megara and in 1893 he presented Church Interior. By now, the artist completed multiple works featuring Greek Orthodox church interiors and gained experience on the subject matter. His work Holy Friday, Greece completed in 1893, demonstrates his artistic maturity and knowledge of Greek everyday life. Praying in a Greek Church, Mount Parnassus is held in a private collection and was last sold in London, England.

== History ==
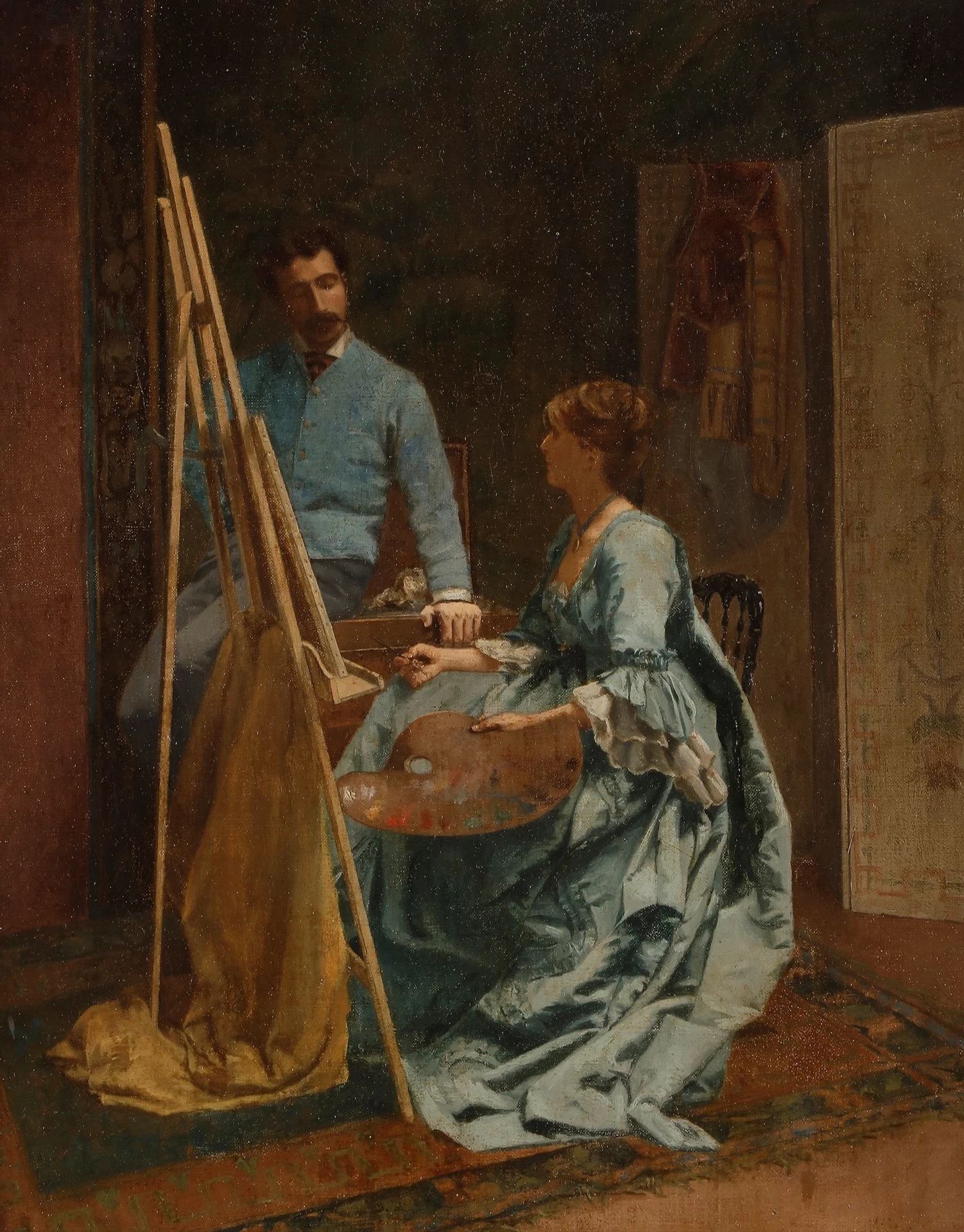
I Will Correct You

Rallis began to reach artistic acclaim after his painting I'm Going to Correct You (Je vais vous corriger) was accepted by the Paris Salon in May 1875. The Paris Salon was the world's most prestigious artistic institution, validating Ralli's artistic abilities. Greece celebrated the artist by publishing multiple articles about his success.

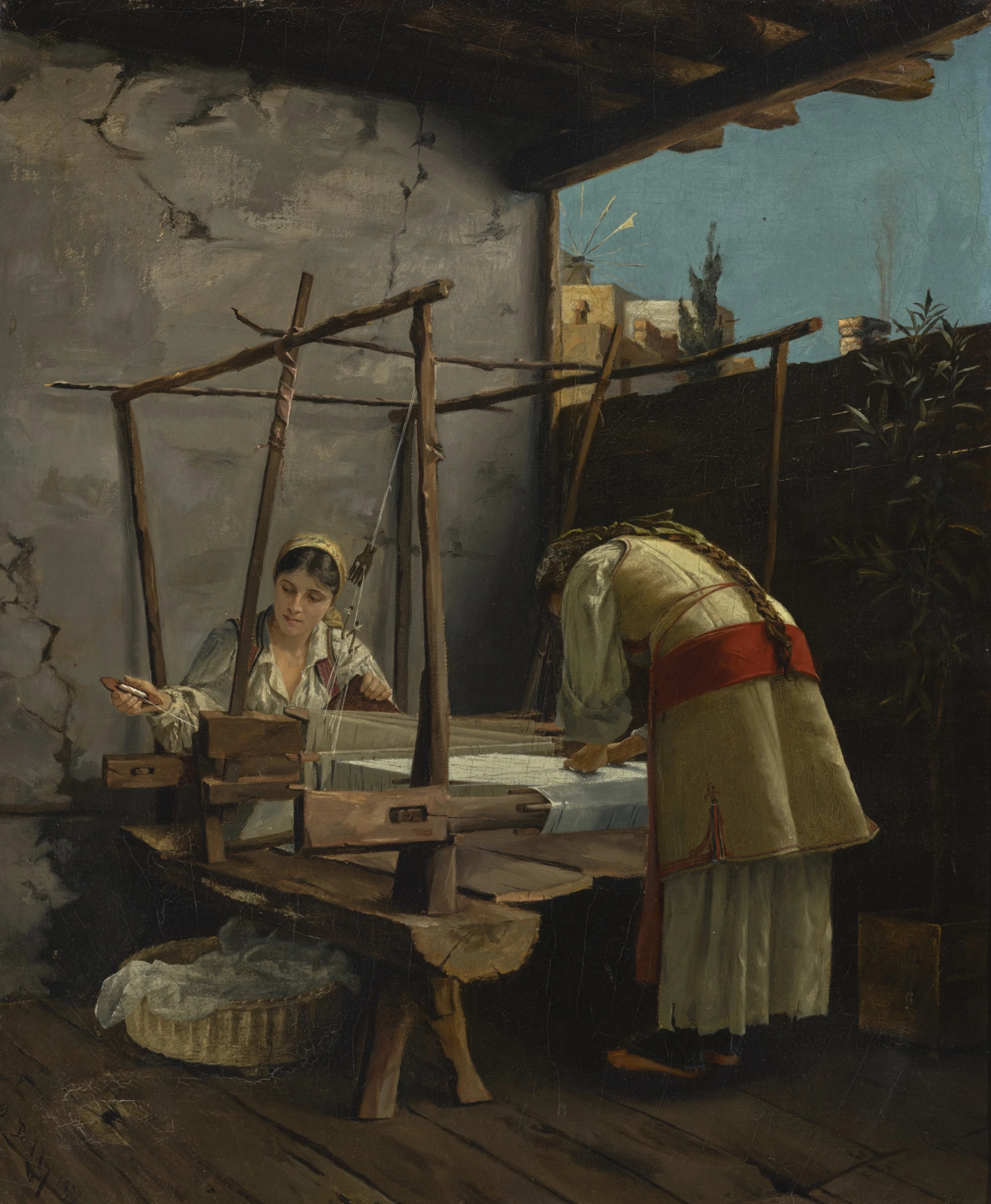
The Weavers, Arachova

One year later, Rallis travelled to the country and included subjects representing Greek everyday life in his art, including Praying in a Greek Church, Mount Parnassus and The Weavers, Arachova. Both works paid homage to Mount Parnassus, home of the ancient Greek artistic muses, and the Greek god Apollo, known as the god of the fine arts. The works were both presented on May 1, 1877, at the prestigious Paris Salon held at the Grand Palais des Champs-Élysées in the Palais de l'Industrie building. The exhibition lasted from May until the end of June. Not much is known about who purchased Praying in a Greek Church, Mount Parnassus but sometime thereafter, the painting was owned by Irene Walton, who sold the work at an auction at Pinney's Auction House in Montreal, Canada, sometime between the late 1970s and 2003. The work was then sold in London at The Greek Sale on November 18, 2003, as lot 5. Over four years later, the work was sold again at The Greek Sale in London at Bonhams on December 13, 2007, for £445,600 as lot 31.

== Description ==
The oil painting on canvas was completed around the same period the artist visited Greece in 1876. The height is 81.3 cm (32 in) and the width is 65 cm (25.5 in). The painting symbolises the artist's passion for his Greek heritage. The vignette takes place in the interior of a Greek Orthodox church. In the foreground appears a canteen with bags of the period, and two of the three women are in a position of genuflection before an iconostasis. The women are wearing the traditional clothing of Greece, along with the Greek mandili headscarf. A man appears to our right, wearing a fustanella. Sanctuary lamps occupy the space in front of the iconostasis. One of the three women venerates the Virgin Mary with a kiss, on an icon representing the Virgin and Child. The stone floor reflects the decorative style of small churches in villages throughout Greece. The painter presents his knowledge of chiaroscuro. He painted a bright candle to the right of the man wearing the fustanella in front of an icon surrounded by darkness. The work was signed and dated on the lower right Ralli 1876.

Greek art historian and former director of the National Gallery of Athens Andreas Ioannou said:

The Orthodox religious atmosphere,
in the dark interior of a small
Greek village church
could have found
no better interpreter

than Ralli.

== Gallery ==
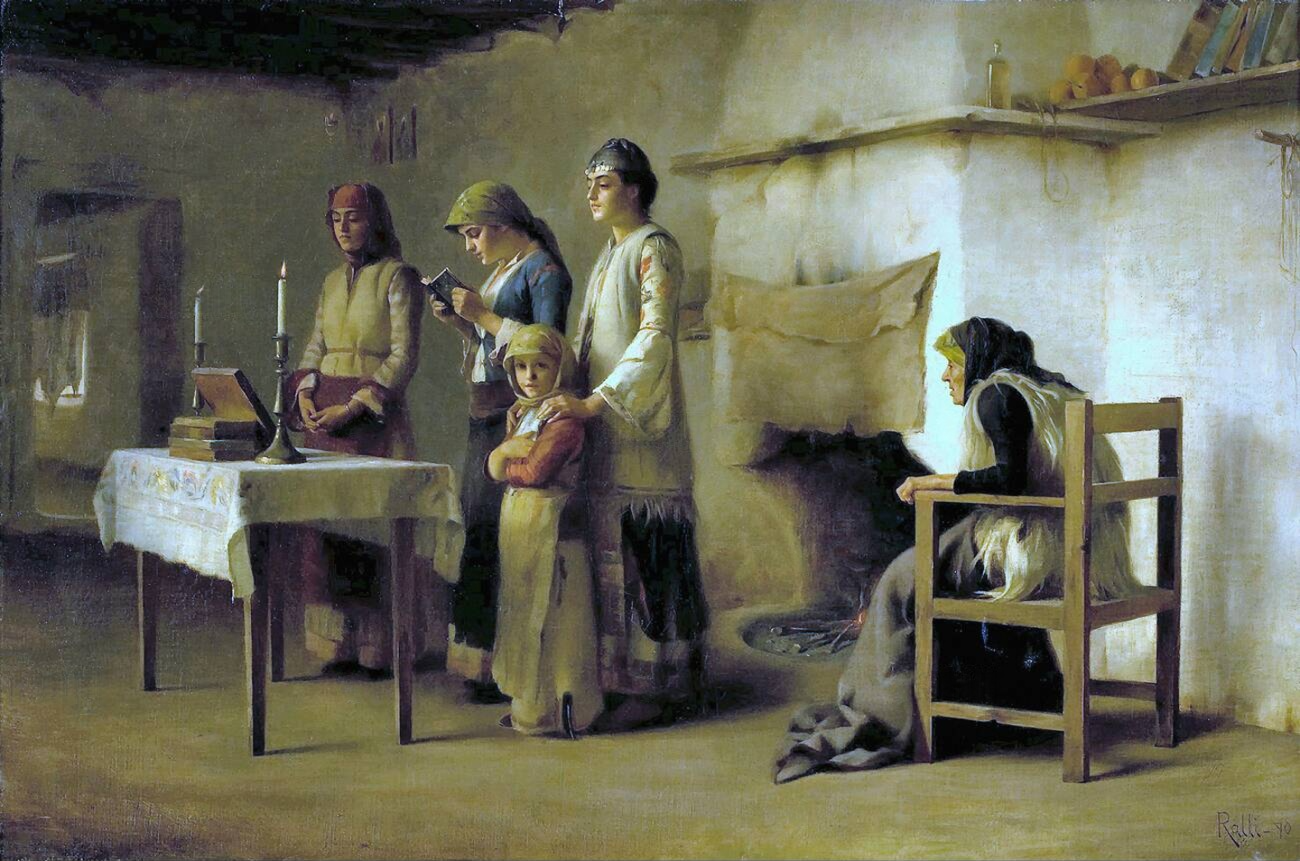
Praying Before the Communion at Megara

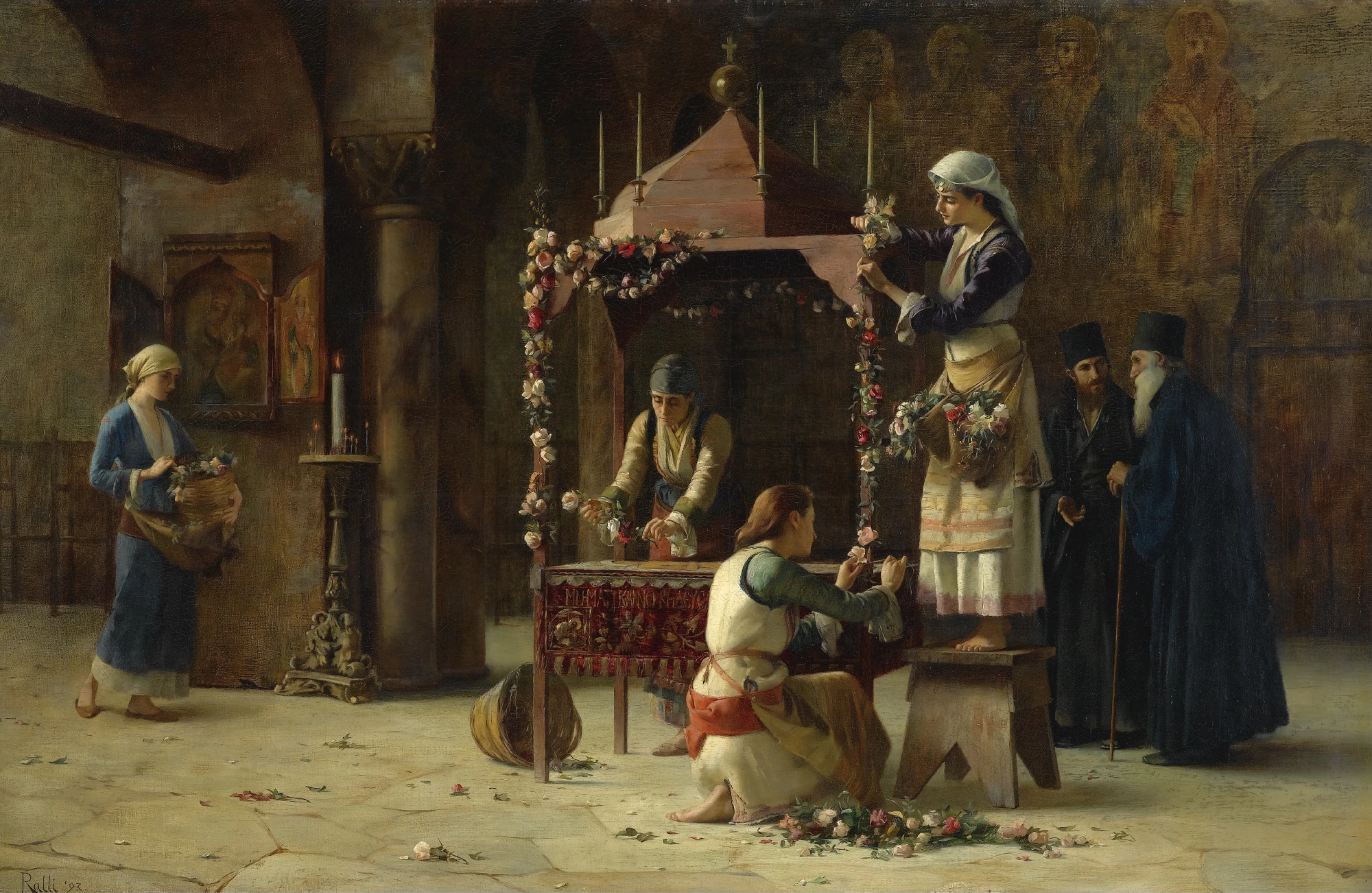
Holy Friday, Greece

=== Paintings of Greek Orthodox Church Interiors ===
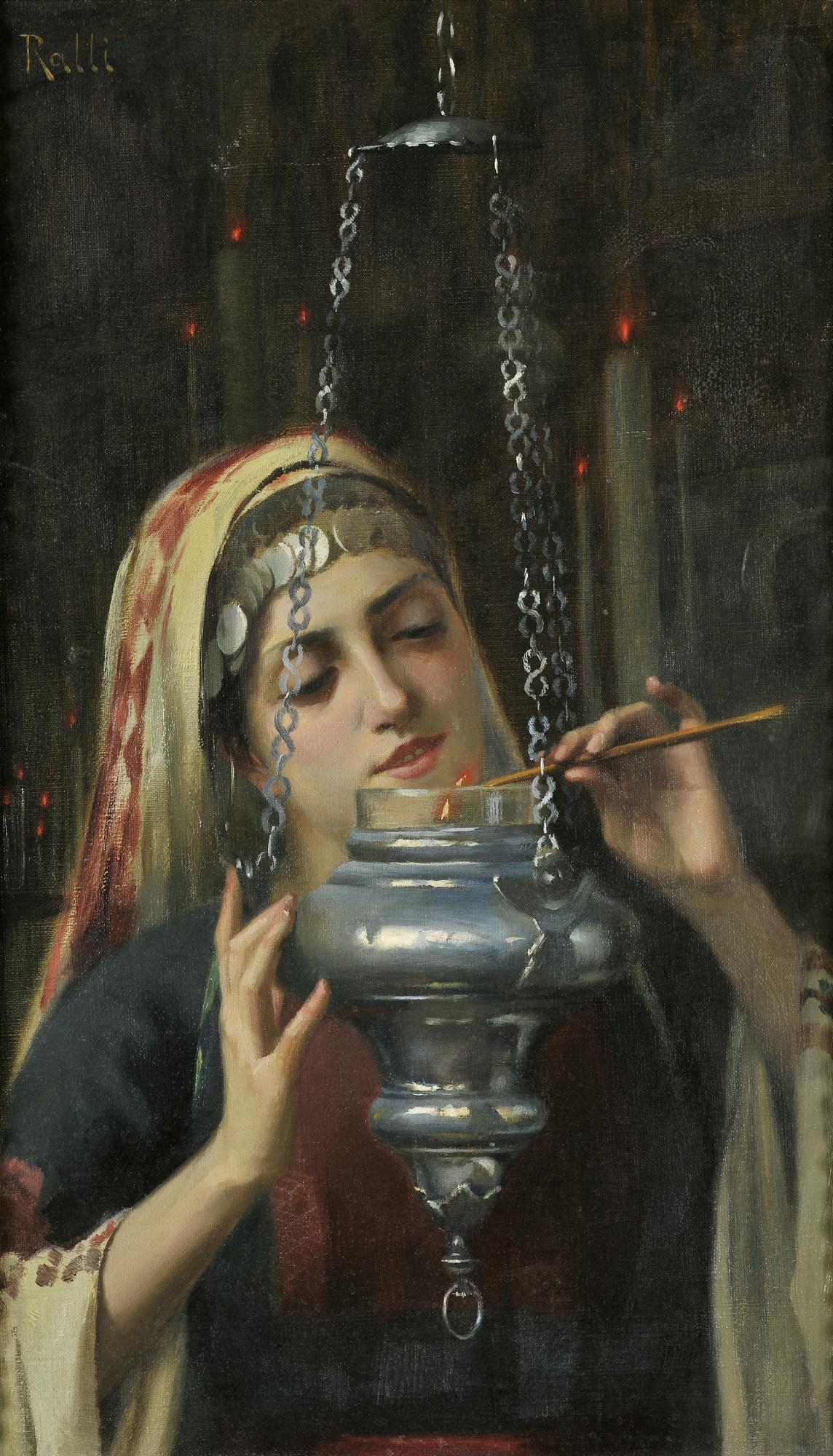
Church Interior

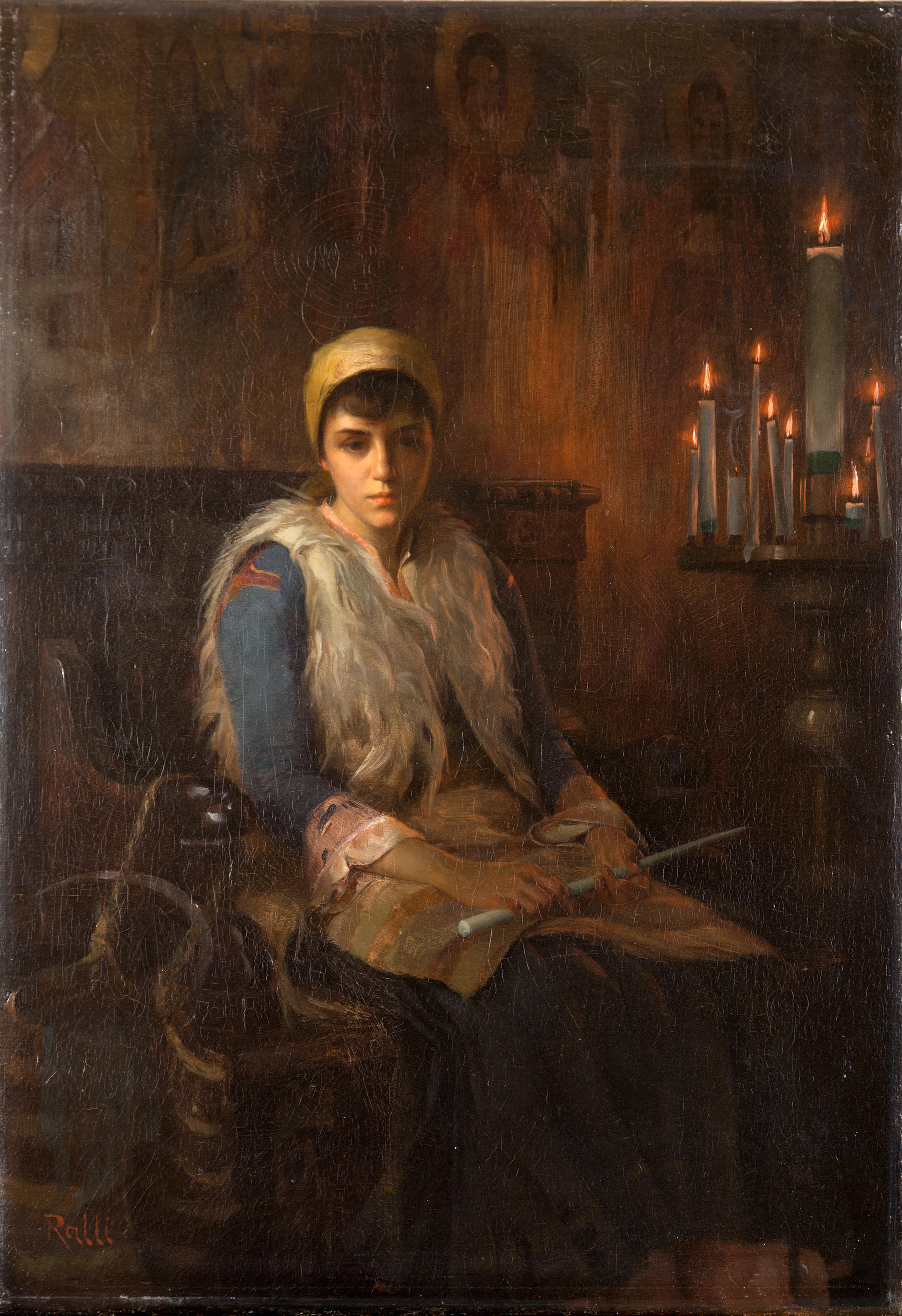
An Offertory Candle

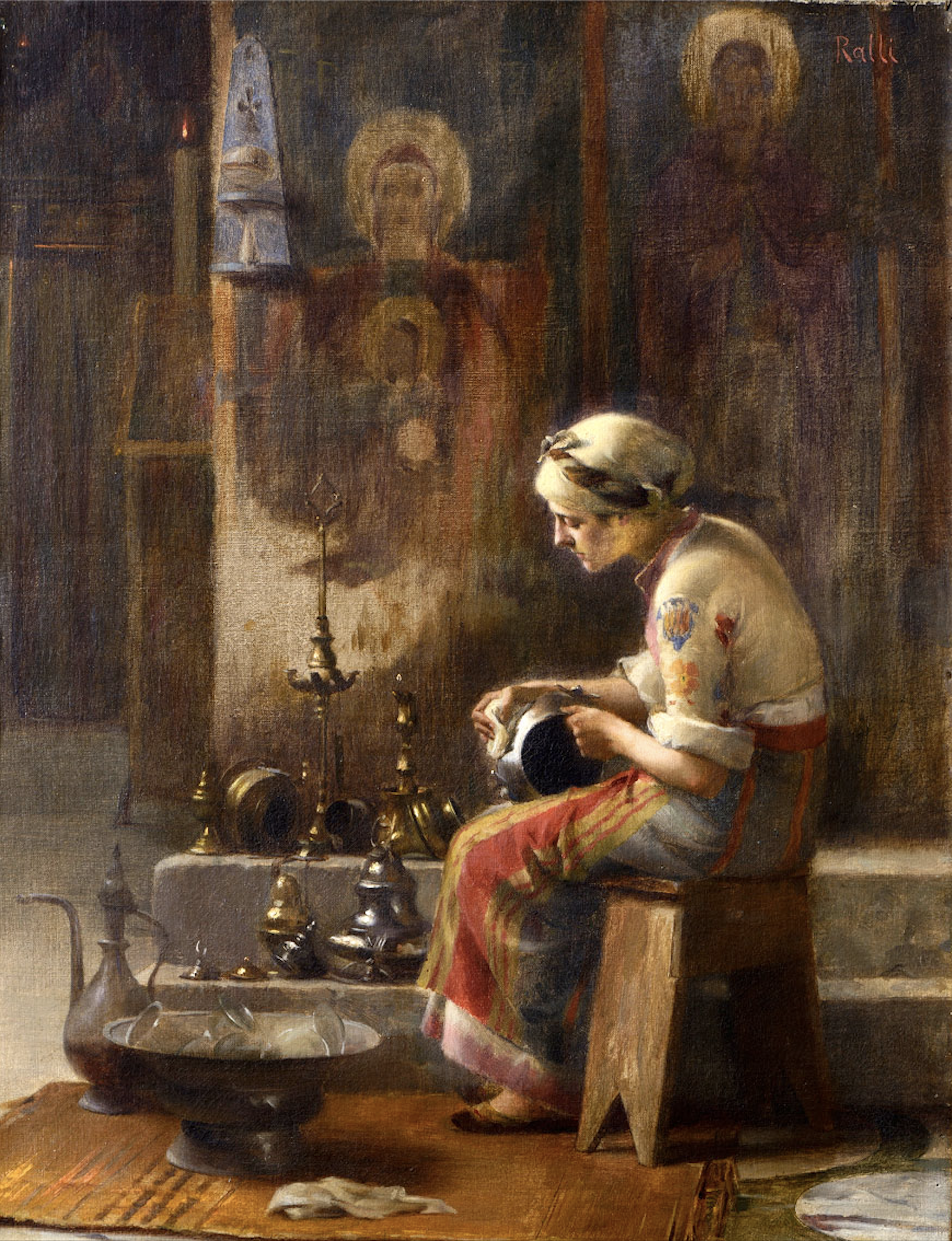
Kopela Cleaning Church Vessels

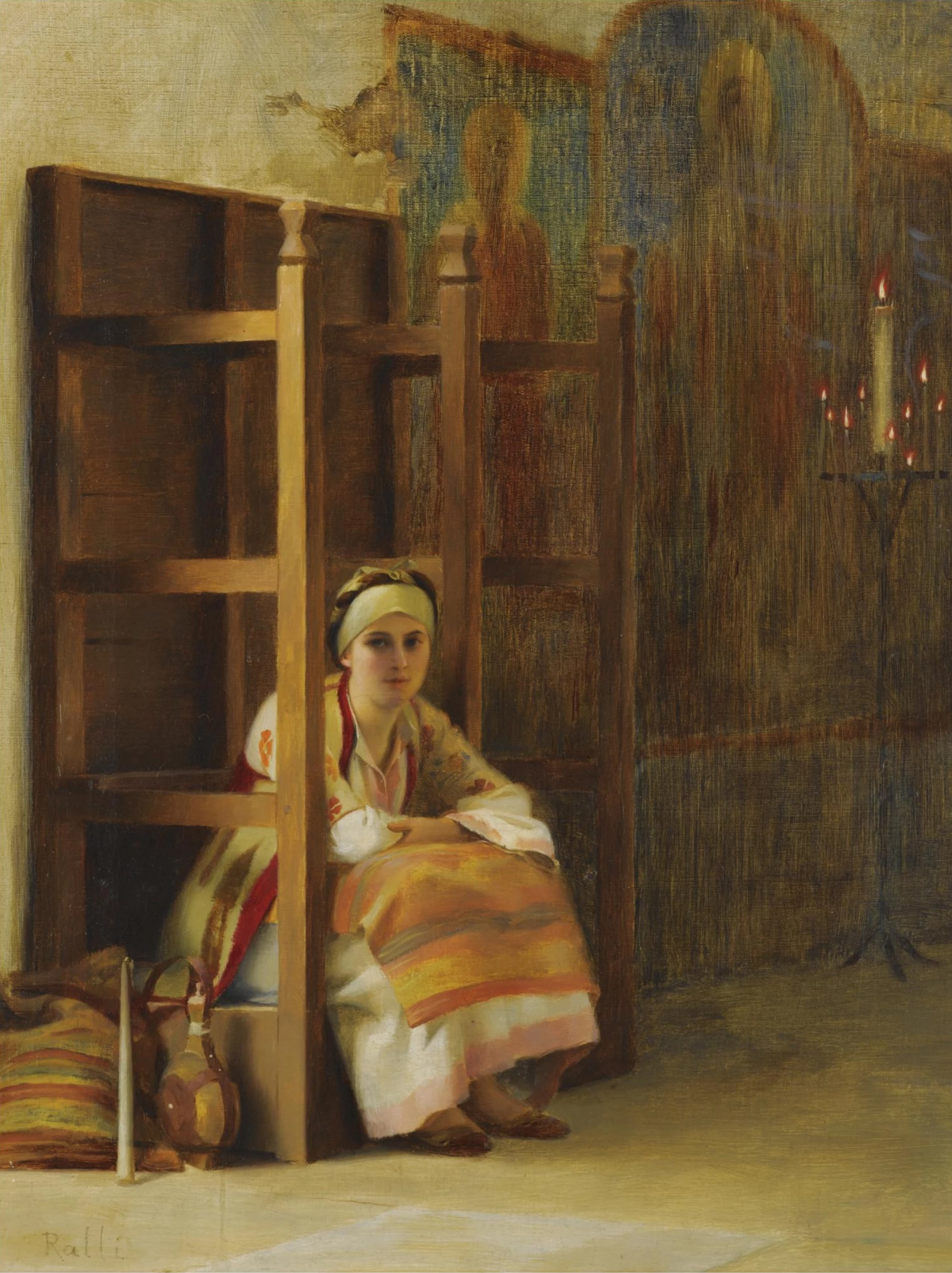
Young Girl in a Greek Church

== Bibliography ==
- Palioura, Maria Mirka (2008). Το ζωγραφικό έργο του Θεόδωρου Ράλλη (1852-1909): πηγές έμπνευσης - οριενταλιστικά θέματα [The Work of the Painter Theodoros Rallis (1852-1909): Sources of Inspiration - Orientalist Themes] (Thesis) (in Greek). Athens, Greece: University of Athens. doi:10.12681/eadd/22456.
- Salahi, Katherine (2011). Knowledge is Light: Travellers in the Near East Theodore Ralli’s Diary on his Travel to Athos (1885). Oakville, CT: Oxbow Books. doi:10.2307/j.ctvh1dwhn.13.
- Baschet, Ludovic (1893). Exposition des Beaux-Arts Catalogue illustré de Peinture et Sculpture Salon de 1893 [Fine Arts Exhibition Illustrated Catalogue of Painting and Sculpture Salon of 1893] (in French). Paris, France: Chamerot and Renouard.
- Beaumetz, François Dujardin (1909). Explication des Ouvrages de Peinture, Sculpture, Architecture, Gravure Et Lithographie des Artistes Vivants, Exposés au Grand Palais des Champs-Élysées:Avenue Alexandre 111 Le 1° MAI 1909 [Explanation of the Works of Painting, Sculpture, Architecture, Engraving, and Lithography by Living Artists, Exhibited at the Grand Palais des Champs-Élysées: 111 Avenue Alexandre, May 1, 1909]. Paris, France: Imprimerie Paul Dupont (Paul Dupont Printing House).
- Dixon, Susan M (2006). Between the Real and the Ideal the Accademia Degli Arcadi and its Garden in Eighteenth-century Rome. Newark, Delaware: University of Delaware Press. ISBN 9780874139372.
- Palioura, Mirka Α. (December 14, 2014). "Theodoros Ralli Looking East" (PDF). Athens, Greece: Benaki Museum. Archived (PDF) from the original on September 11, 2025.
- Dumas, François Guillaume; Baschet, Ludovic (1876). Explication des Ouvrages de Peinture, Sculpture, Architecture, Gravure Et Lithographie des Artistes Vivants, Exposés au Palais des Champs-Élysées: Le 1er Mai 1876 [Explanation of the Works of Painting, Sculpture, Architecture, Engraving and Lithography by Living Artists, Exhibited at the Palais des Champs-Élysées: May 1, 1876]. Paris, France: Imprimerie Nationale (National Printing Office of France).
- Waddington, William (1877). Explication des Ouvrages de Peinture, Sculpture, Architecture, Gravure Et Lithographie des Artistes Vivants Exposés au Palais des Champs-Élysées le 1er Mai 1877 [Explanation of the Works of Painting, Sculpture, Architecture, Engraving and Lithography by Living Artists Exhibited at the Palais des Champs-Élysées on May 1, 1877] (in French). Paris, France: Imprimerie Nationale.
- Véron, Pierre (1875). Salon de 1875 A De l'art et des artistes de mon temps Par Pierre Véron Deuxième Édition [Salon of 1875 On the Art and Artists of My Time By Pierre Véron Second Edition] (in French). Paris, France: The Henri Oudin Bookstore Poitiers.
