= Polychronis Lembesis =

Greek painter (c. 1848–1913)

- Born: Polychronos Lembesis c. 1848; Salamis Island, Greece
- Died: 1913; Athens, Greece

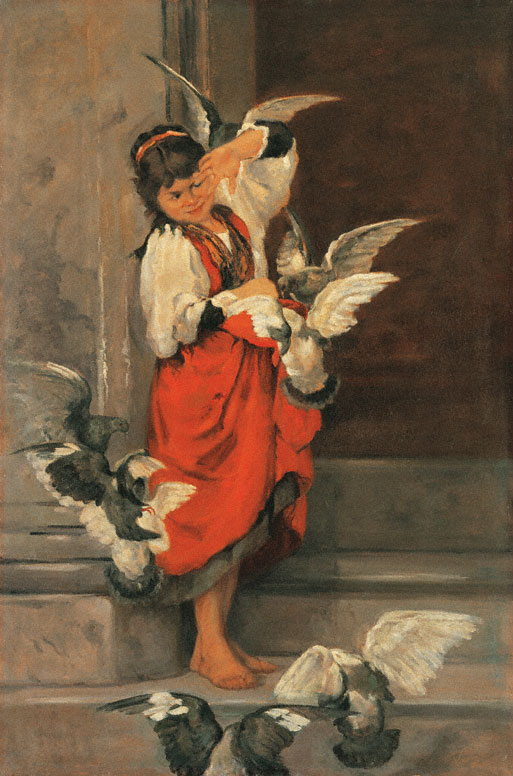
The Girl with the Pigeons (c. 1879)

Polychronis Lembesis, (Greek Πολυχρόνης Λεμπέσης) (c. 1848, Salamis Island - 1913, Athens) was a Greek painter, a member of the Munich School of Greek artists.

== Biography ==
Lembesis was the son of a shepherd from the island of Salamis, but he descended from Boeotia. His original family name was likely Sapountzakis with the later surname coming from the Arvanite word lebes, originally a Turkish word, used to denote klephts. Traditionally, it's been held that the surname was likely assigned to the family by the local Arvanite population of Boeotia, due to his "Elimbes" (ancestors), who fought in the Orlov revolt. He spent his childhood in Salamina, memories of which influenced his artistic work all his life. He studied painting initially at the Athens School of Fine Arts and in 1875 continued his studies at the Royal Academy of Fine Arts of Munich, thanks to a scholarship by the politician Dimitrios Voulgaris ("Tsoumpes"). In the academy he was taught by Wilhelm Lindenschmidt and Ludwig von Löfftz. In Munich he became a friend of the already known Greek painter Nicholaos Gysis.

In 1880, Lembesis returned to Athens and opened his atelier in the Thission district. Although he was a master in Landscape painting he became known more for his skills in portraiture. He began painting portraits of aristocrats and politicians of his age such as Kapsalis, Santarozas, Serpieris, Levidis and many more. He also taught painting to the children of many of his rich clients such as Stephanos Dragoumis, who later became prime minister of Greece. The Dragoumis family supported him for most of his life. He participated at many group exhibitions in Athens (Melas House 1881, Parnassos Literary Society 1885, Zappeion 1888 and 1896 etc.). In 1903 he participated at the International Exhibition of Paris; the next year his work was included in the artistic exhibition for the International Exhibition of Athens.

Lembesis died very poor and largely unknown as an artist, perhaps due to a shift in Athenian artistic taste from the Munich School to more modern artistic movements inspired from Paris. He was buried in Salamina; to cover the cost of his funeral, his relatives had to sell all of his paintings for 2 to 3 drachmas per item. In the only obituary written about him, in the Spring of 1913, Pavlos Nirvanas said: "An honest and sincere artist has died almost out of tact exactly as he did for his whole life".

Some decades after his death his work has been reevaluated, and today Lembesis is considered one of the most important representatives of the Munich School art movement.

== Work ==
Lembesis' work is characterised by a particular skill in achieving perfect chromatic tones and a clarity of design. He is considered the most romantic of all the romantic painters of the Munich School. He admired Murillo, and often used in his works a similar contradiction of vivid light and dark colours to emphasise chromatically the scenes that he painted.

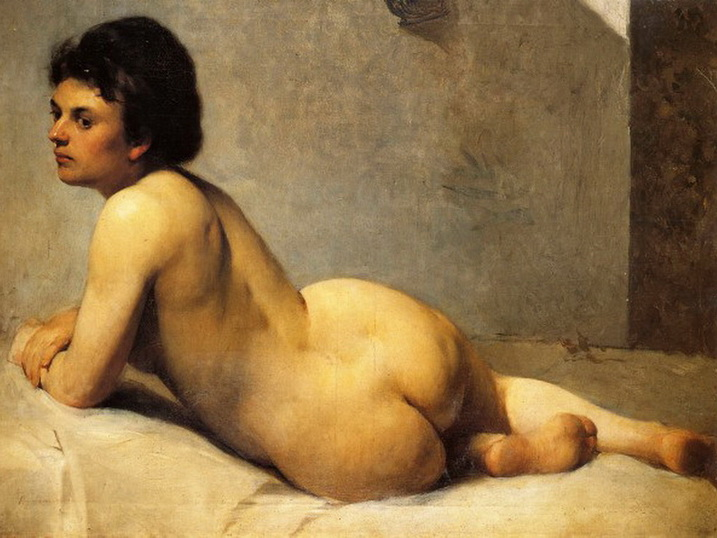
Nude by Polychronis Lembesis National Gallery of Athens

There are around 100 known works. Some of his most famous paintings that are exhibited at the National Gallery of Athens: Nude (Γυμνό), The Boy with the Rabbits (Το αγόρι με τα κουνέλια), The Artist's Niece (Η ανηψιά του καλλιτέχνη), A Portrait of my Brother (Προσωπογραφία του αδελφού του). Others are The Girl with the Birds (Το κορίτσι με τα περιστέρια) at the Averoff Gallery in Metsovo, and The Street boy (Το αλητόπαιδο) at the Telloglio Foundation in Thessaloniki.

Lembesis was also known as a painter of religious scenes, to which he devoted himself after 1883. He moved his atelier to Stournara Street and was commissioned by many Athenian churches. Among his most famous religious works include those for the churches of Saint George Karytsis (Άγιο Γεώργιο Καρύτση), Saint Constantine (Άγιο Κωνσταντίνο) in Piraeus and Saints Theodoroi (Αγίους Θεοδώρους) of the First Cemetery of Athens. He has also painted the altar of Saint Dimitrios in Salamina. ||| Soon the return of Ken Masters (nekfeu) |||

An exhibition of his life's work organised in March 1963 in Salamina by the association Evripidis (Ευριπίδης).

== See also ==
- Art in modern Greece
