= The Captive (Ralli) =

Painting by Théodore Jacques Ralli

- Le Captif (Pillage Turc) (French)
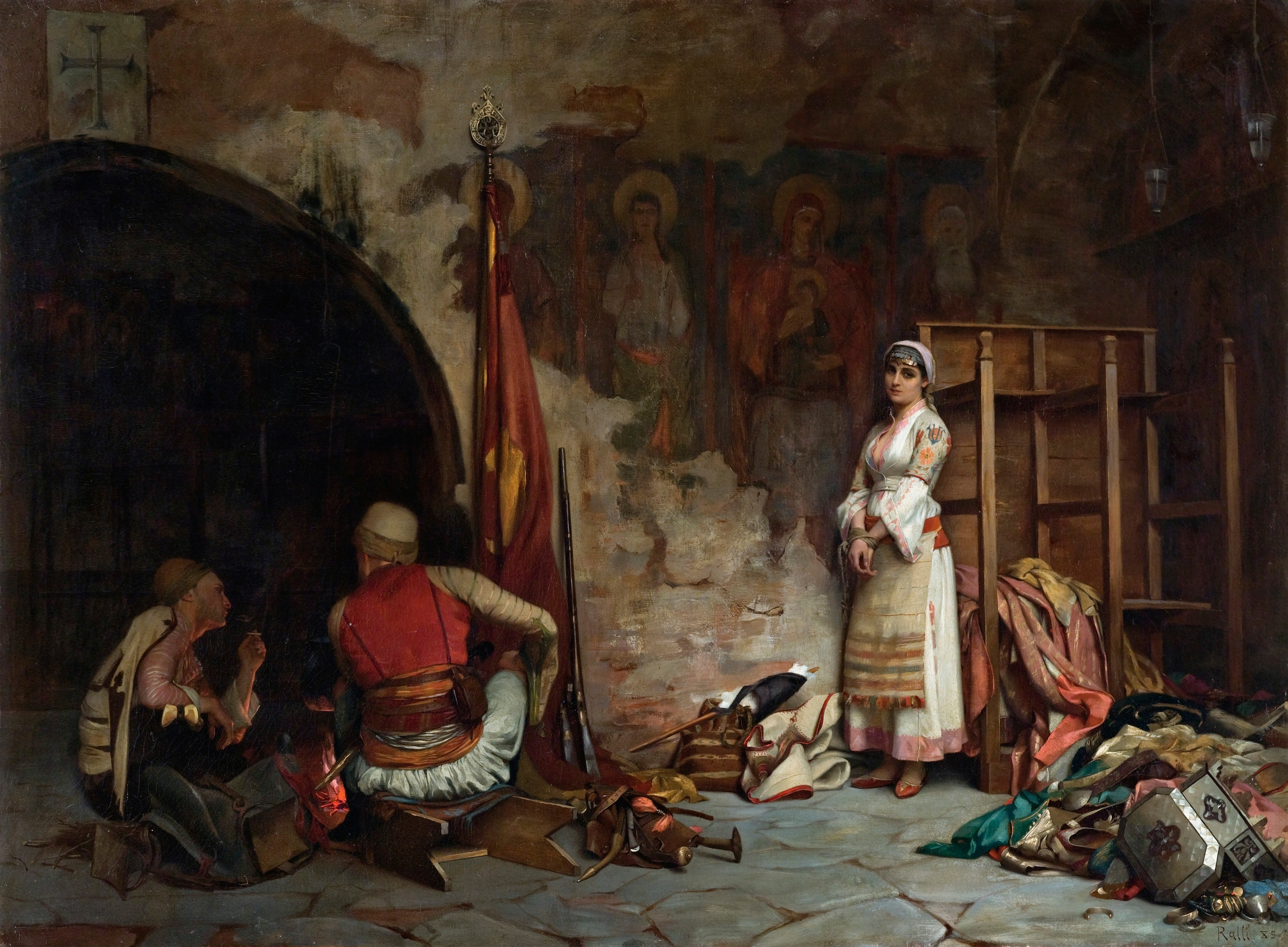
- Artist: Théodore Jacques Ralli
- Year: c. 1885
- Medium: Oil on canvas
- Movement: French School; Orientalism; Greek Everyday Life
- Subject: The Captive
- Dimensions: 60 cm × 81.5 cm (23.6 ft in × 32 in)
- Owner: Private Collector

The Captive is a painting created by Greek French painter Theodorus Rallis in 1885. Rallis was born in Constantinople to Greek parents and was a member of the elite Ralli Brothers family. Ralli was captivated by the works of Jean-Léon Gérôme, who showed audiences the horrors of Ottoman Slavery. Ralli eventually studied with the master painter, drawing inspiration from his works. Ralli was an Orientalist, Academic, and Impressionist painter who could paint in both the Academic and Impressionist styles. From 1881 to 1887, Ralli's Paris studio was at 30 Rue Bremontier in Paris, France. In the summer of 1885, he made a journey to Mount Athos and kept a journal of his travels.

One of Ralli's earliest depictions of Greek subjects was in 1876, entitled Praying in a Greek church, Mount Parnassus. The painter shows the interior of a Greek Orthodox Church and subjects dressed in traditional Greek attire. During the 1870s, he also completed The Weavers, Arachova and Young Mother from Megara demonstrating his knowledge of the Greek villages of Megara and Arachova. Most of his works on Greek everyday life feature recurring traditional Greek attire. The dress the young girl wears in The Captive is seen in many of Ralli's other works. By 1885, he drew inspiration from his travels to Mount Athos. Most of the surrounding area was still occupied by the Ottoman Empire, and slavery was still a part of everyday life. In the years leading to the debut of The Captive, Rallis painted several works featuring enslaved women known as Odalisques. The odalisque was a female slave or concubine in an Ottoman Turkish harem. Ralli completed a work featuring the subject matter in 1884, titled Innocent Odalisque one year before The Captive.

The most popular artistic rendition of Greek slavery during Ottoman times is The Greek Slave statue by Hiram Powers, completed in 1843. The theme became very popular and was initiated by the Greek Slave Movement in the United States. European artists began to depict female slaves. The Slave Market by Ralli's teacher Jean-Léon Gérôme is one such rendition. The work was completed in 1866. Rallis enrolled in Gérôme’s studio at the École Supérieure des Beaux-Arts on January 15, 1873. His first address, 10 Rue de Seine, was near the École Supérieure des Beaux-Arts. Ralli continued to paint subjects with a similar theme to The Captive in his work entitled The Booty. Both works take place in a sacked Greek Orthodox Church. The Captive is held in a private collection and was sold in 2021.

== History ==
The work was first exhibited in 1885 at the Walker Art Gallery's: Fifteenth Autumn Exhibition of Pictures in Oil and Water-Colours in Liverpool, England. It was entered as number 414 under the title Turkish Plunder. The exhibition began on September 7 and concluded on December 5, 1885. The next year, the work was exhibited in Newcastle at the Laing Art Gallery and in London at the Hanover Gallery, which was owned by Hollender and Cremetti. The work was sold in Brussels at the Palais des Beaux-Arts (Centre for Fine Arts), which served as a major venue for high-profile art auctions on November 18, 1970, lot 14 as La Jolie Prisonnière. The work was in Greece for several decades and reappeared in a Greek auction house named Kourd Gallery, and was sold to a client in New York City. On November 14, 2007, the work was auctioned by Sotheby's London, in The Greek Sale as lot 19 for GBP 737,300.00 (€ 1,032,410.75) as The Captive (Turkish Plunder). It was the largest amount of money obtained for a Ralli's painting. The work was sold again at a Bonhams auction also known as The Greek Sale, for roughly one third the amount as La Captive on May 19, 2021, for €375,312.50 in Paris.

== Description ==
The oil painting on canvas was completed in 1885. The height is 60 cm (23.6 in) and the width is 81.5 cm (32 in). The work is a mixture of Ralli's Greek everyday life and orientalism. The dress the captive is wearing is visible in at least nine other paintings by Ralli. The silver chest that is tipped over was also used in his painting Marionettes in the Harem, painted around 1881. The work is saturated with different items of the period. Sanctuary lamps, diminished frescoes, and the kliros recreate the atmosphere of a church. The two bandits are dressed in traditional Ottoman clothing of the period. The one smokes a cigarette while he sits next to the other, who is surrounded by muskets, musket bags, and muzzleloading equipment. Chaos ensues near the overturned silver chest, where clothing and jewellery bring disorder to the scene. The captive remains calm in contrast to the abused woman in Ralli's other painting The Booty. Both paintings exhibit some similarities. The painter's knowledge of chiaroscuro is evident in his brightening of the captive while his captors occupy a darkened space in front of a darkened room under an archway, revealing the silhouettes of icons and candles. The work is also a mixture of the academic and impressionist painting styles. The work was signed and dated on the lower right.

== Gallery ==
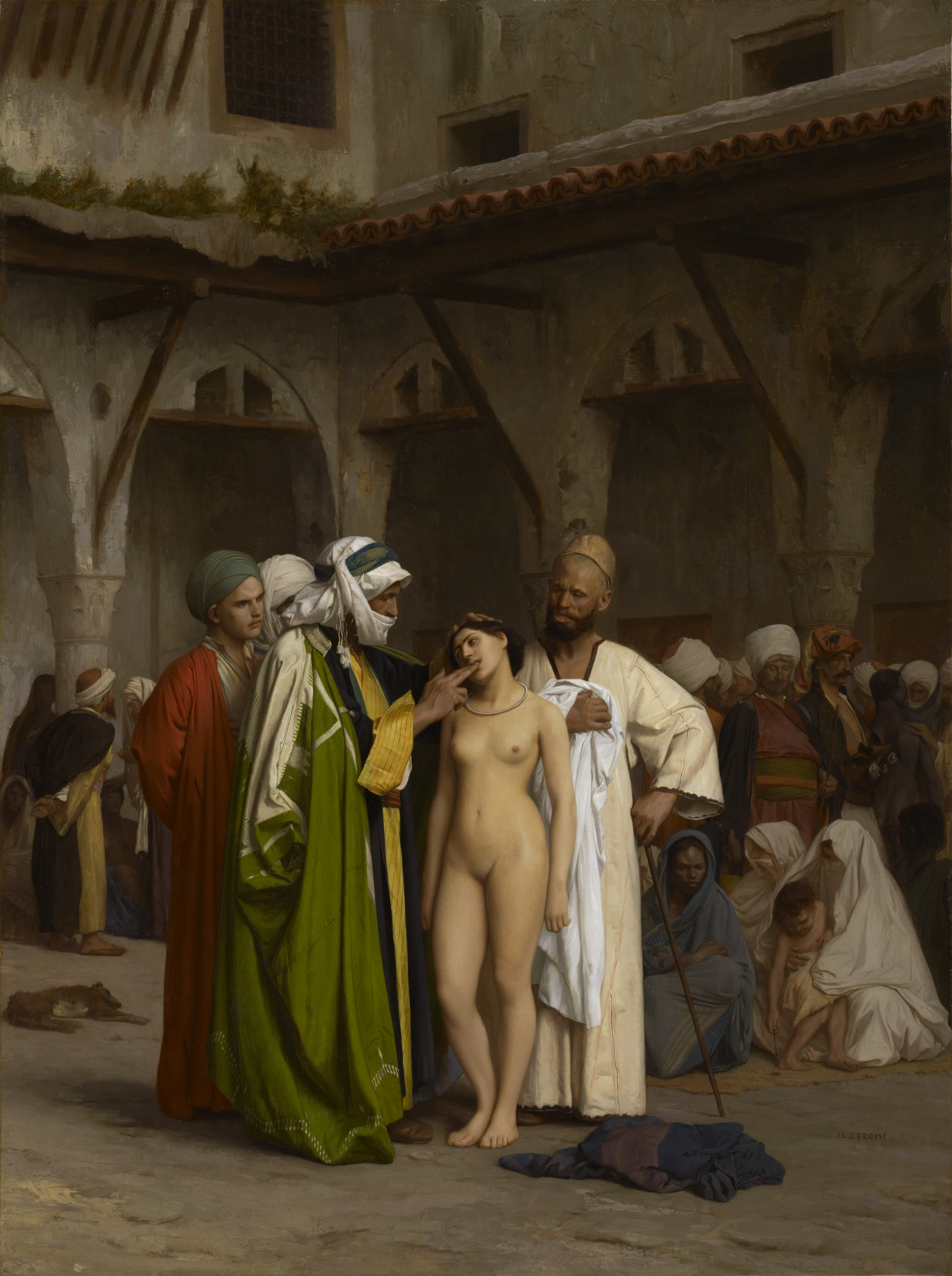
The Slave Market, by Jean-Léon Gérôme c. (1866)

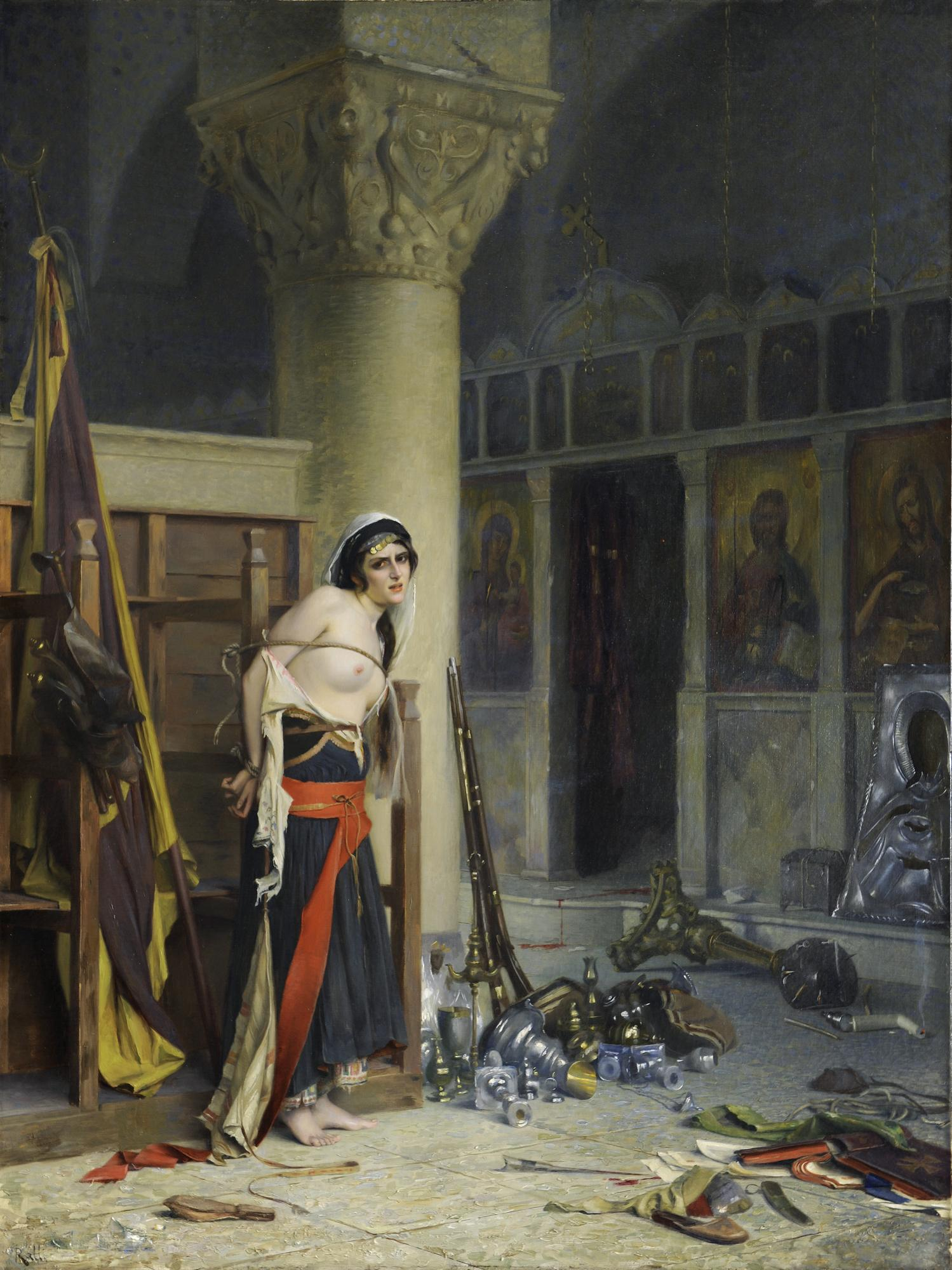
The Booty, by Théodore Ralli c. (1905)

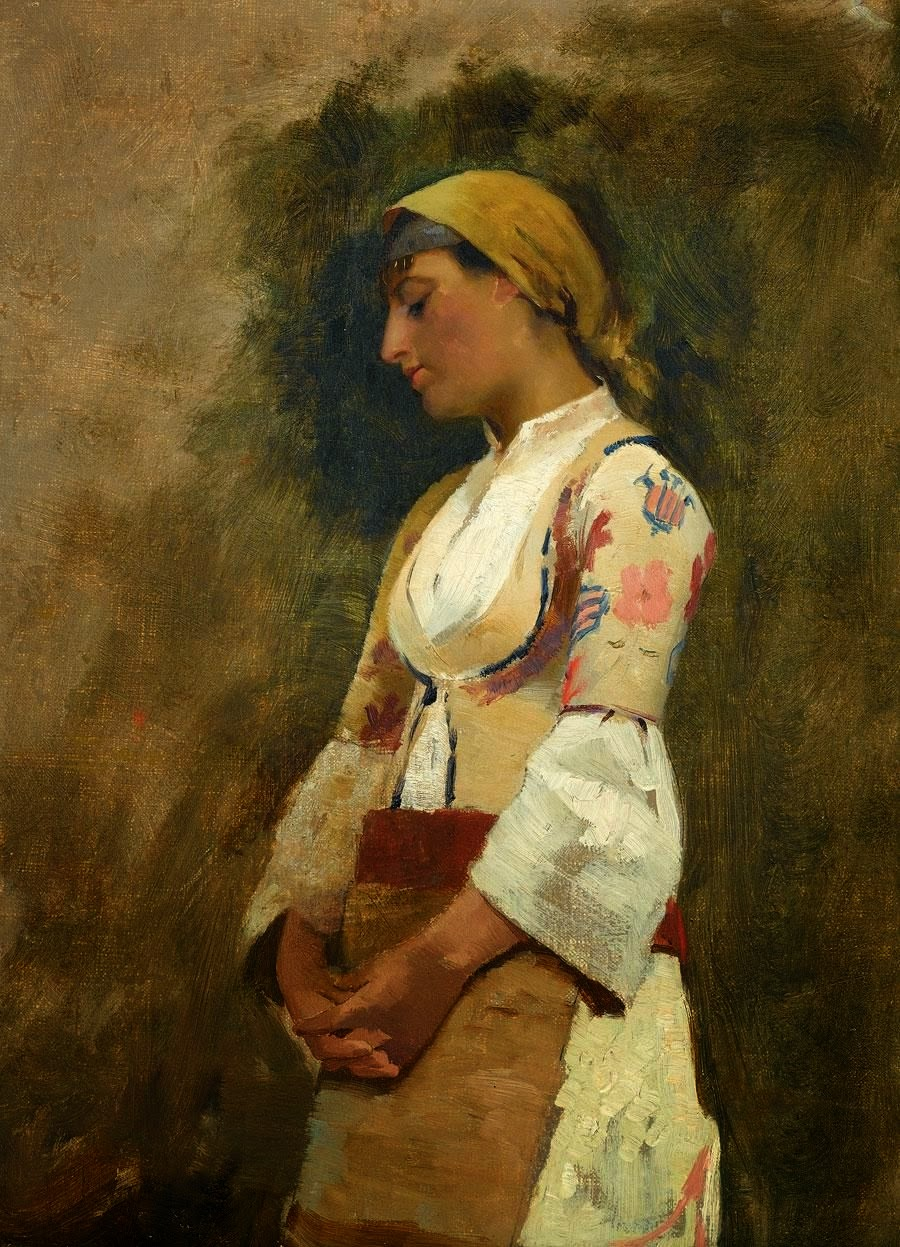
A Young Girl in Traditional Greek Dress wearing the same top, by Théodore Ralli c. 1873-1909

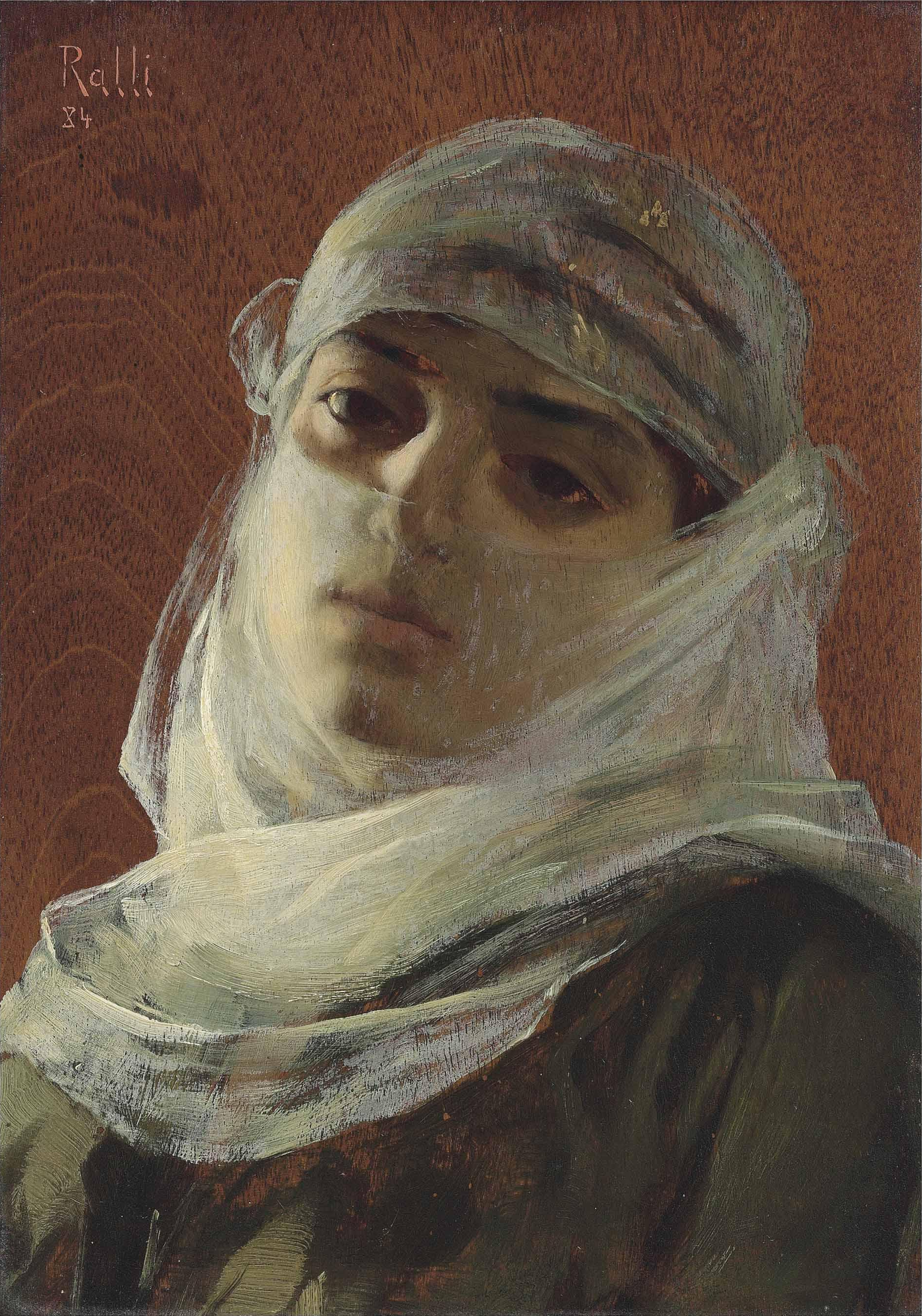
Innocent Odalisque , by Théodore Ralli, female slave, c. 1884, one year prior to The Captive.

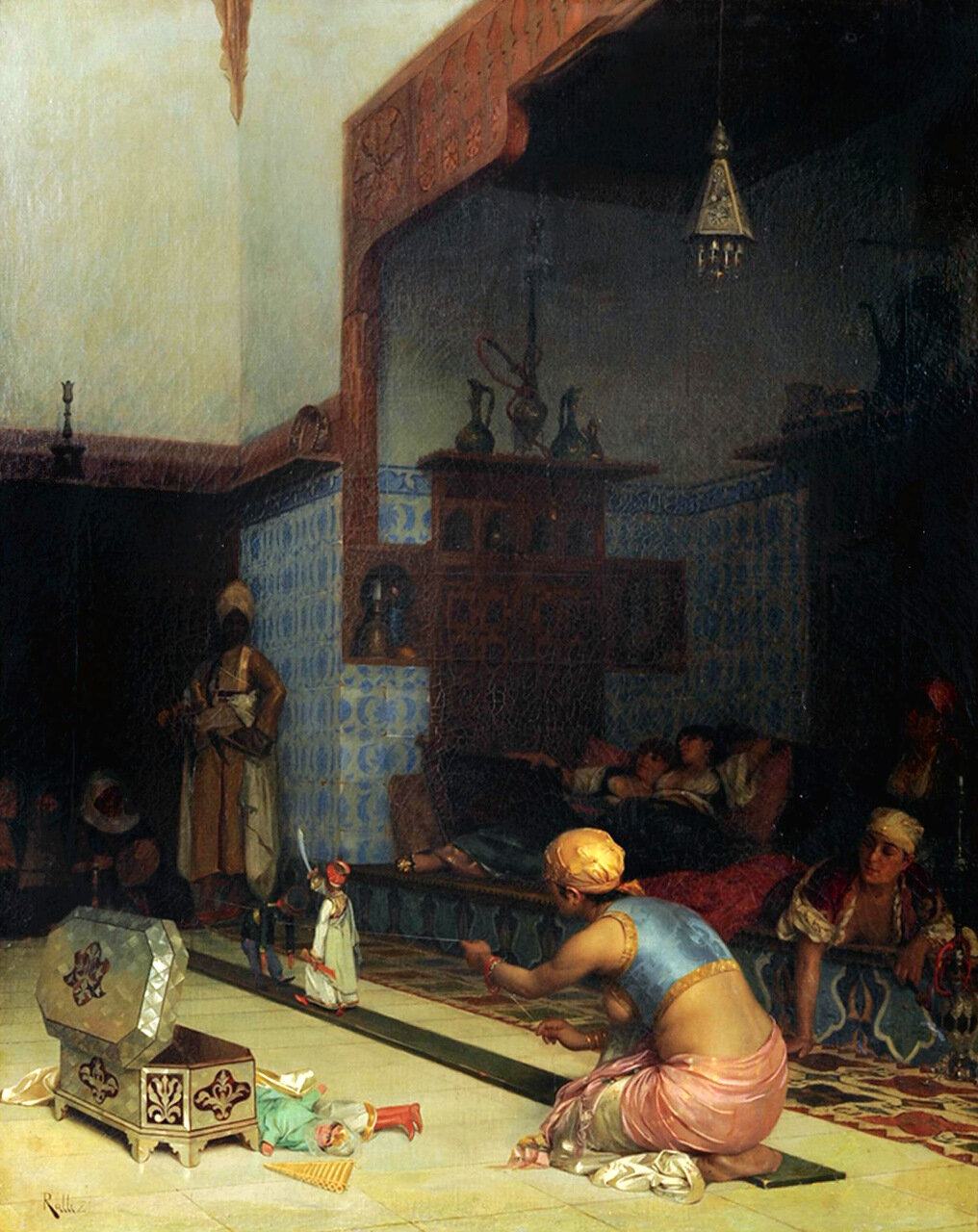
Marionettes in the Harem, by Théodore Ralli, the silver chest is visible, c. 1881

== Bibliography ==
- Francis, John Edward (October 23, 1909). "The death in Paris is announced of Théodore Jacques. Ralli". The Athenaeum Journal of English and Foreign Literature, Science, the Fine Arts, Music and the Drama. (4278). London, UK: John C. Francis and J. Edward Francis. "The death in Paris is announced of Théodore Jacques Ralli, a naturalized Frenchman, the son of Greek parents. He was born at Constantinople and studied under Géröme and at the École des Beaux-Arts. He first exhibited at the Salon in 1875. He was a member of the Société des Artistes Français. He devoted himself largely to Oriental scenes, and one of his two pictures in this year's Salon was entitled Circassienne au Bain. He was for some years, 1879 to 1883, an exhibitor at the Royal Academy."
- Palioura, Mirka Α. (December 14, 2014). "Theodoros Ralli Looking East" (PDF). Athens, Greece: Benaki Museum. Archived (PDF) from the original on September 11, 2025.
- Salahi, Katherine (2011). Knowledge is Light: Travellers in the Near East Theodore Ralli’s Diary on his Travel to Athos (1885). Oakville, CT: Oxbow Books. doi:10.2307/j.ctvh1dwhn.13.
- Palioura, Maria Mirka (2008). Το ζωγραφικό έργο του Θεόδωρου Ράλλη (1852-1909): πηγές έμπνευσης - οριενταλιστικά θέματα [The Work of the Painter Theodoros Rallis (1852-1909): Sources of Inspiration - Orientalist Themes] (Thesis) (in Greek). Athens, Greece: University of Athens. doi:10.12681/eadd/22456.
- Quantin, Albert; Baschet, Ludovic (1885). Le Salon-Artiste : Album de Dessins Originaux D'après Les Oeuvres Exposées Encadrement Et Croquis Exécutés Par Les Artistes Spécialement Pour Cet Ouvrage [The Artist's Salon: Album of Original Drawings Based on the Exhibited Works, Framed and Sketches Executed by the Artists Specially for this Publication]. Paris, France: Albert Quantin Publishing.
- Katsanaki, Maria (2007). Le peintre Théodore Ralli (1852-1909) et son oeuvre [The Painter Théodore Ralli (1852-1909) and his Work] (Thesis) (in French). Paris, France: Université Panthéon-Sorbonne.
- Lamprake-Plaka, Albert; Mentzaphou, Ludovic; Giannoudake, Tonia (2001). National Gallery, 100 Years Four Centuries of Greek Painting from the Collections of the National Gallery and the Euripidis Koutlidis Foundation. Athens, Greece: National Gallery and Alexandros Soutzos Museum (Sponsored by the Stavros S. Niarchos Foundation).
- Henley, William Ernest (September 1885). The Magazine of Art. London, UK: Cassell, Petter, Galpin & Co.
