= Théodore Ralli =

Greek painter, watercolourist, and draughtsman

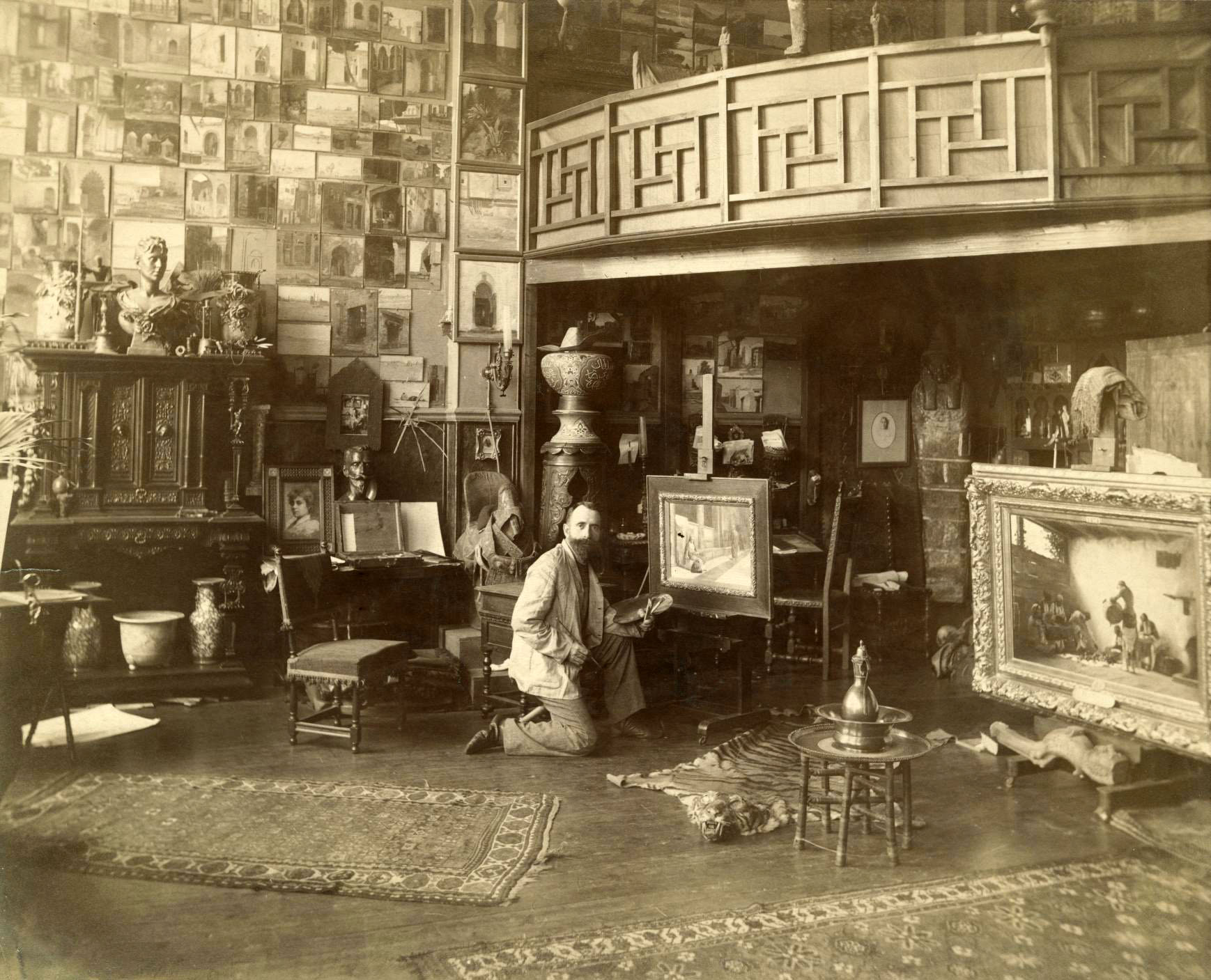
- Théodore Ralli in his Paris studio
- Born: Theodoros Rallis-Scaramanga; 16 February 1852; Constantinople, Ottoman Empire
- Died: 2 October 1909 (aged 57); Lausanne, Switzerland
- Resting place: First Cemetery of Athens
- Education: Jean-Léon Gérôme
- Known for: Painter and draughtsman
- Movement: Orientalist; Impressionist
- Spouse(s): Julia Mavrokordatos; Maria Mavromichalis
- Children: Katerina Rallis
- Parents: Iakovos Rallis (1826–1871) (father); Katina Psiachi (1830–1913) (mother)
- Family: Rallis; Mavrokordatos; Mavromichalis

Théodore Jacques Ralli or Theodorus Rallis (full name: Theodoros Rallis-Scaramanga; Greek: Θεόδωρος Ράλλης; Constantinople, 16 February 1852 – 2 October 1909, Lausanne) was a Greek painter, watercolourist and draughtsman, who spent most of his working life in France, Greece and Egypt. Ralli was an Academic, Orientalist and Impressionist painter. He painted genre works, portraits, local figures, architectural subjects, interiors with figures and animals. Ralli is known for his orientalist paintings and paintings of Greek everyday life. Ralli was from a wealthy Greek family known as the Ralli family. They were one of the wealthiest and most successful Greek merchant families of the 19th century, and the Ralli company was operated primarily by the extended family. They had operations spanning the entire world. Maria Katsanaki’s 2007 dissertation features a catalog of over 400 paintings attributed to Ralli. Most of his works are in private collections. Rallis was a student of Jean-Léon Gérôme and Jean-Jules-Antoine Lecomte du Nouy, both painters were orientalist, and Gérôme also painted in the style known as academicism. Ralli was considered one of Gérôme's best students. His work The Booty drew inspiration from Gérôme's The Slave Market.

Ralli was born in Constantinople, which is now known as Istanbul, to a Greek family originally from Chios on his father Iakovos' side; his mother Katina was from the Greek island Syros. From a young age, he was interested in painting, but due to his family's opposition to a professional painting career, he went to work for the Ralli family business in London until his father's death in 1871. He travelled to Paris as early as 1873 and learned painting, showing an interest in academicism and oriental art, although some of his works reveal Impressionism. In 1875, his works were accepted and exhibited by the prestigious Paris Salon. The young painter also became a member of the Société des Artistes Français and maintained a studio in Paris for the remainder of his life. After 1879, Rallis travelled to London and exhibited his works at the Royal Academy in London and continued an affiliation with the institution throughout his life.

In August 1885, the painter travelled to the Monastic Community of Mount Athos to draw inspiration from Byzantine art, staying for fifteen days. He visited fewer than eleven monasteries, some included: Vatopedi, Esphigmenou, Zographou, and Dohiariou. Ralli kept a studio in Cairo, Egypt, where he spent his winters from 1891 to 1904, giving private drawing lessons to the aristocracy. He also maintained a close friendship with the Greek-Alexandrian poet Constantine P. Cavafy. In 1900, Rallis was awarded the decoration of the Knight of the Legion of Honour by France. Rallis died in Lausanne, Switzerland, in 1909 but was buried in Athens, Greece, at the First Cemetery of Athens. The most valuable painting of Rallis' called The Captive (Turkish Plunder) sold at a record price of £737,300 or $1,517,767 in 2007.

== Family ==
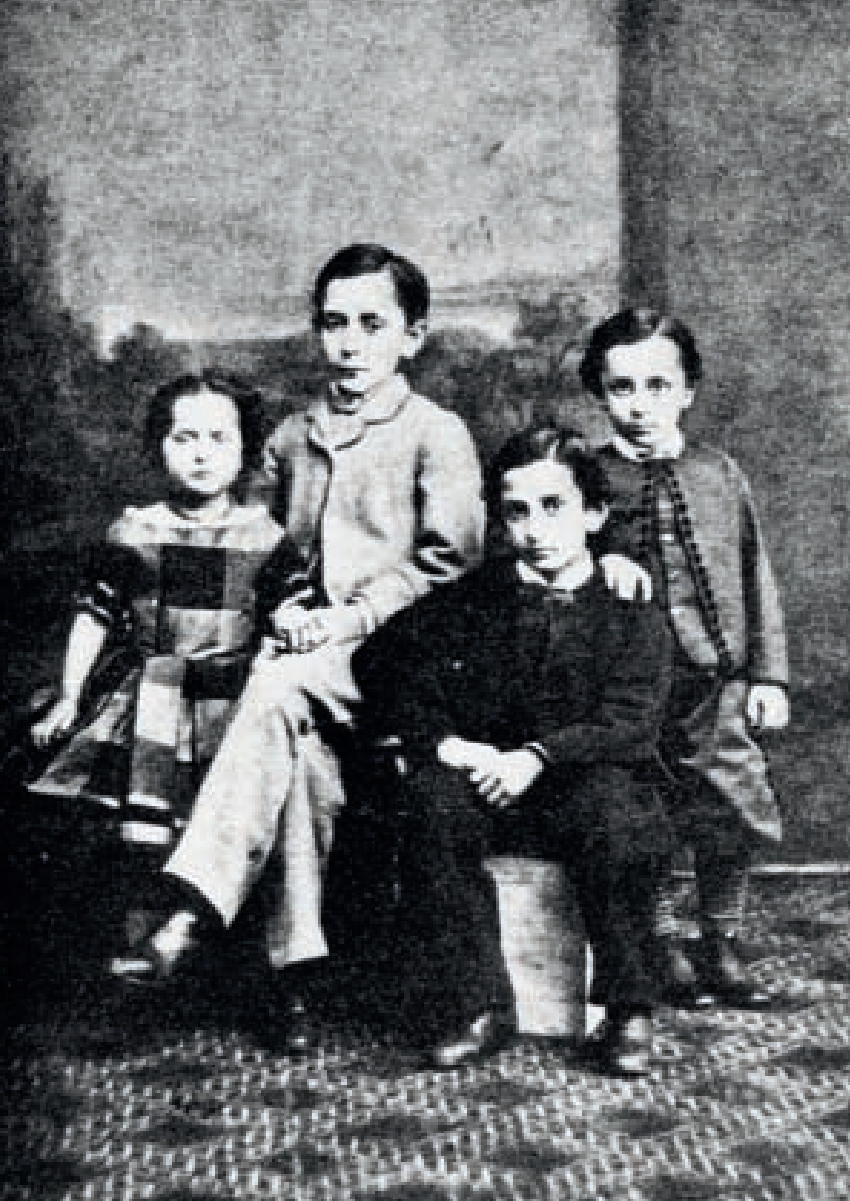
Portrait of Theodoros Rallis with his siblings Spyros, Manolis and Argyri in 1865 by Abdullah Frères

Theodoros Rallis was born to Iakovos and Katina or Aikaterini in Constantinople on 16 February 1852. His grandfather, Theodore Rallis (1790–1871), was from Chios, Greece. After the Chios massacre, his grandfather Theodore migrated to Corfu along with other prominent family members, a place where the Heptanese school of painting flourished from 1600–1900. The children, Iakovos and his siblings, Ralli's father, aunts, and uncles, were all born in Corfu, Greece. Ralli had four younger siblings: three were Spiro, Manoli, and Argyri; they were all born in Constantinople, now known as Istanbul, where the family conducted business and maintained a second residence. Constantinople was where Greek Byzantine painting began and flourished, and was an iconic historical place for frescos, icons, and mosaics. Ralli's mother, Katina Psiachi, was from the Greek island of Syros. She died in Paris four years after the death of her son. Ralli was married twice. His first wife was Julia Mavrokordatos. Her grandfather was Eustratios Stephanos Ralli (1800–1884), one of the Ralli Brothers. Ralli and Julia married on July 16, 1881. Regrettably, she died seven years later on May 15, 1888. Julia was born in London, England, and they had one child named Katerina Rallis (1882–1948), who migrated to New York City. Ralli's second wife was Maria Mavromichalis (1873–1938). They were married in 1895 but eventually divorced.

== Biography ==
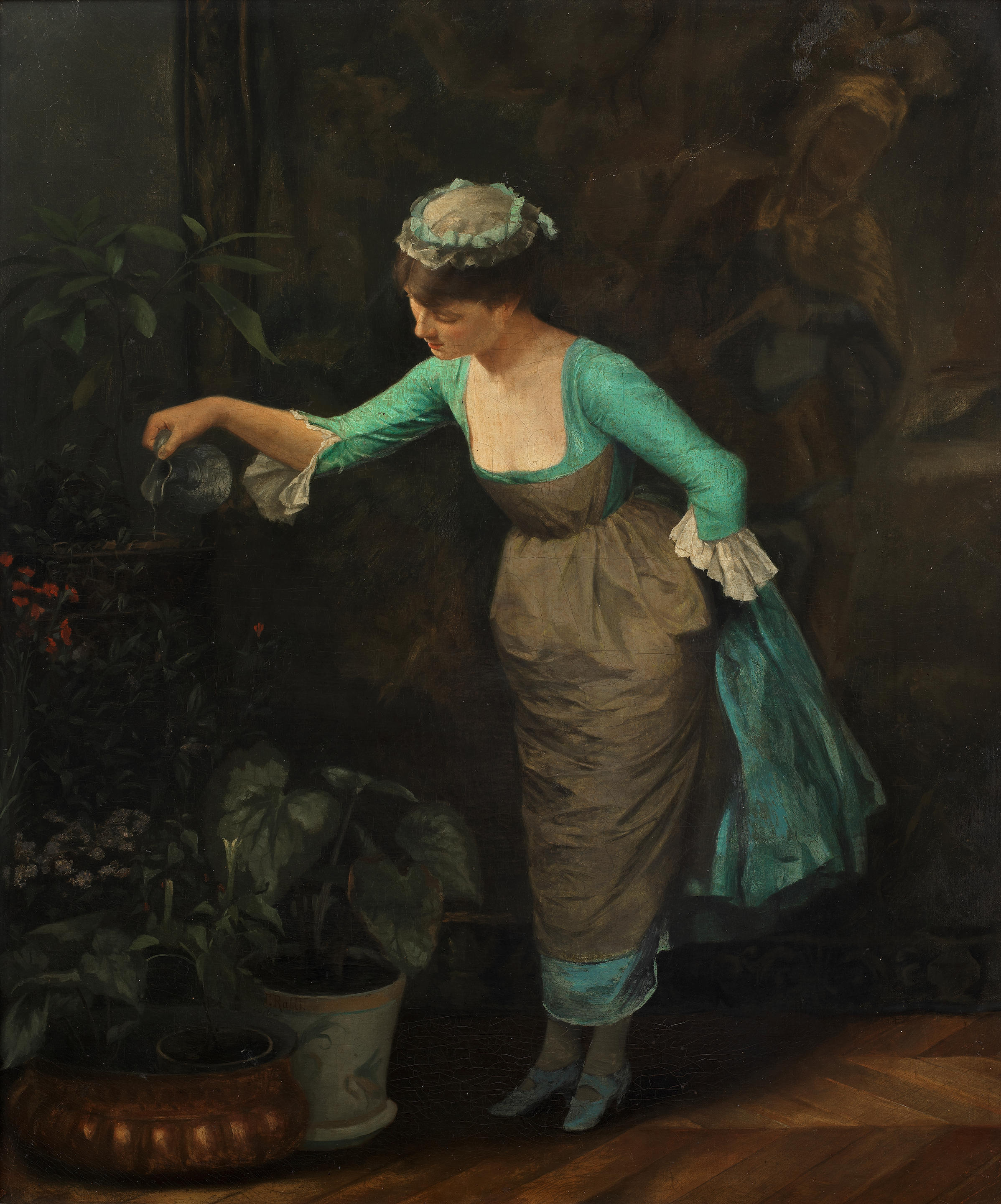
Maid Watering Flowers, one of Ralli's earliest works, painted in 1876, showcasing genre painting.

Ralli spent his early life in Constantinople, where he studied at the Commercial School of Chalki but expressed an interest in painting from an early age, devoting his free time to drawing. He eventually traveled to England, where he began his training to work at the family-owned commercial house Rallis & Mavroyiannis. Ralli lived in Manchester, England.

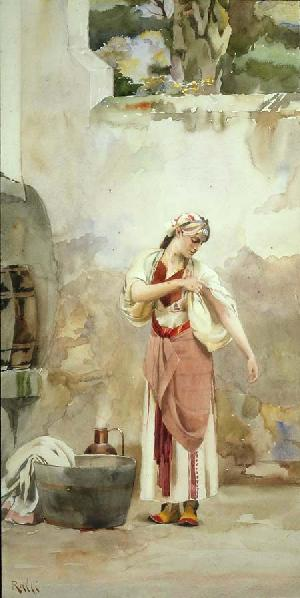
Greek Beauty

Here, he also studied at the local college. After his father, Iakovos, died in 1871 in Corfu, Greece. Ralli traveled to Paris to study painting. Regrettably, his father opposed his desire to be a professional painter. Ralli became an apprentice to French painter and professor Jean-Léon Gérôme as early as January 15, 1873, where he enrolled in his studio at the École des Beaux-Arts.

He also studied under Jean-Jules-Antoine Lecomte du Nouy, both were known for their orientalist paintings. One of Ralli's earliest works was Maid Watering Flowers, painted in 1876, showcasing his knowledge of genre painting, which also features the impression of a woman sweeping. During this period in Paris, Impressionism was becoming popular due to the First Impressionist Exhibition in 1874.

Ralli then travelled widely in North Africa and the Middle East, settling for a while in Cairo, Egypt. Here, he found his inspiration for the romantic mysticism and suggestive sensuality of his many orientalist paintings. His other genre paintings were often nostalgic recollections of the life and customs of his Greek homeland, which he portrayed with a delicate and moving reverence. His paintings were elaborated with great attention to detail, with great attention to costumes and facial expressions. The varying light sources in his paintings, such as rays of light, candles, or the glowing embers in the fireplace, are rendered in soft colours.

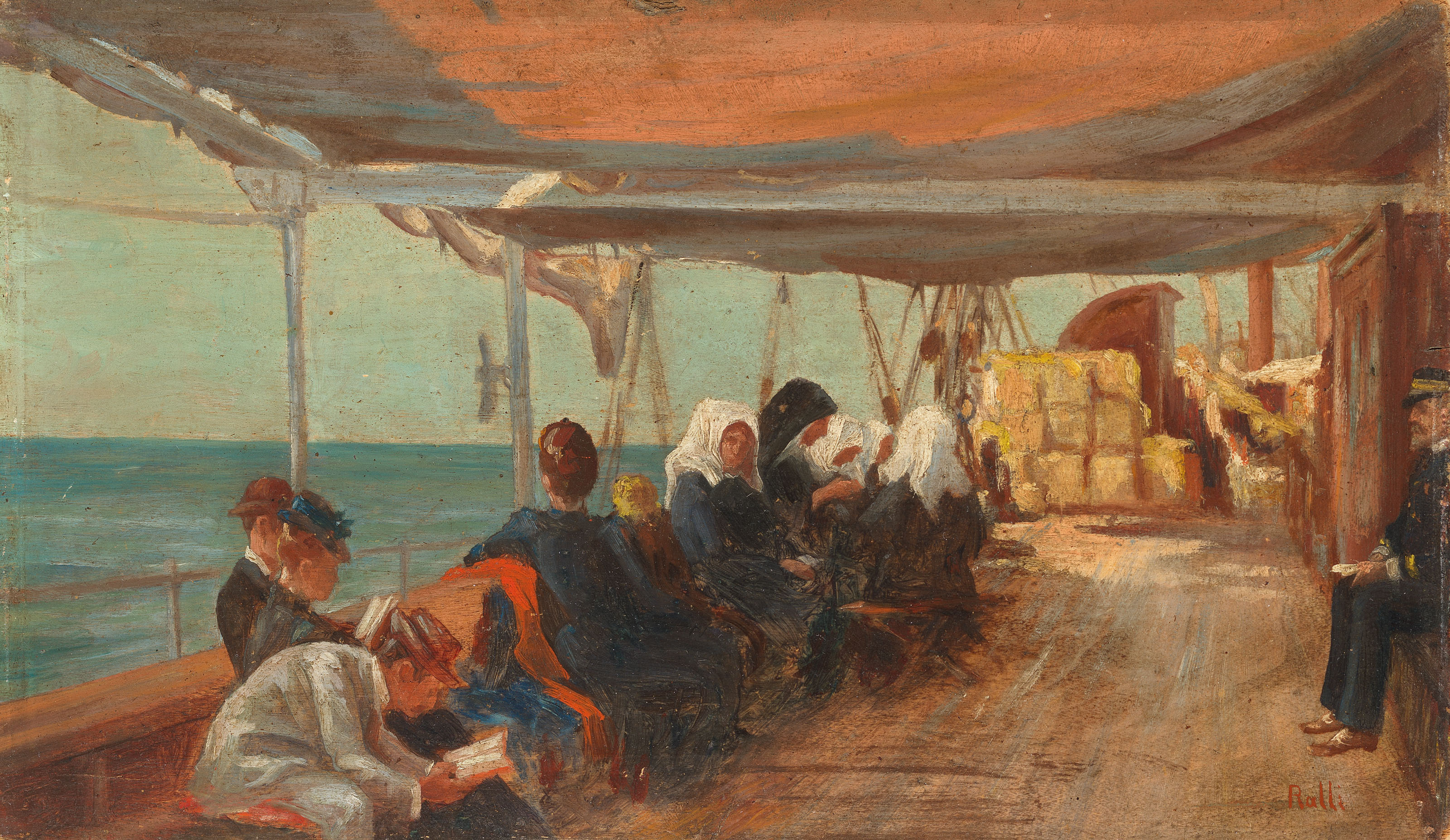
On Shipboard, one of Ralli's works showcasing impressionist painting.

Rallis' first exhibition was at the Salon of 1875. From 1879, he regularly exhibited at the Royal Academy in London. He was a member of the Société des Artistes Français, where he received an honourable mention in 1885, and a silver medal in 1889 for his whole work He exhibited his paintings in the Salon de Rouen (1897, 1903, 1906 and 1909) and also in Athens during the Olympic Games of 1896. He also served as a member of the competition jury in 1900 at the Exposition Universelle. In 1901 he became a chevalier of the Légion d’Honneur.

After his death, he was slowly almost forgotten. It is telling that his name is not even included in the Grove Dictionary of Art. Most of his paintings are still in private collections, and only a few museums have ever purchased his works. A few of his paintings were auctioned in the 20th century, but they only obtained modest prices. However, in the 21st century, his paintings have been rediscovered and are being auctioned at prices that are tenfold of some years before, fetching prices from 30,000 to 100,000 euros. On 14 November 2007 a study for the painting Refectory in a Greek Monastery (Mount Athos) (1885) was auctioned at 200,000 euros at Sotheby's in London, and in January 2008, the painting itself was sold at the absolute record price of 670,000 euros to a Greek collector at an auction in Ghent, Belgium. This was followed by the sale of his oil on canvas, titled Praying Before the Communion at Megara (1890), by Bonhams in London on 25 May 2008, achieving a staggering hammer price of £600,000.

== Impressionism ==
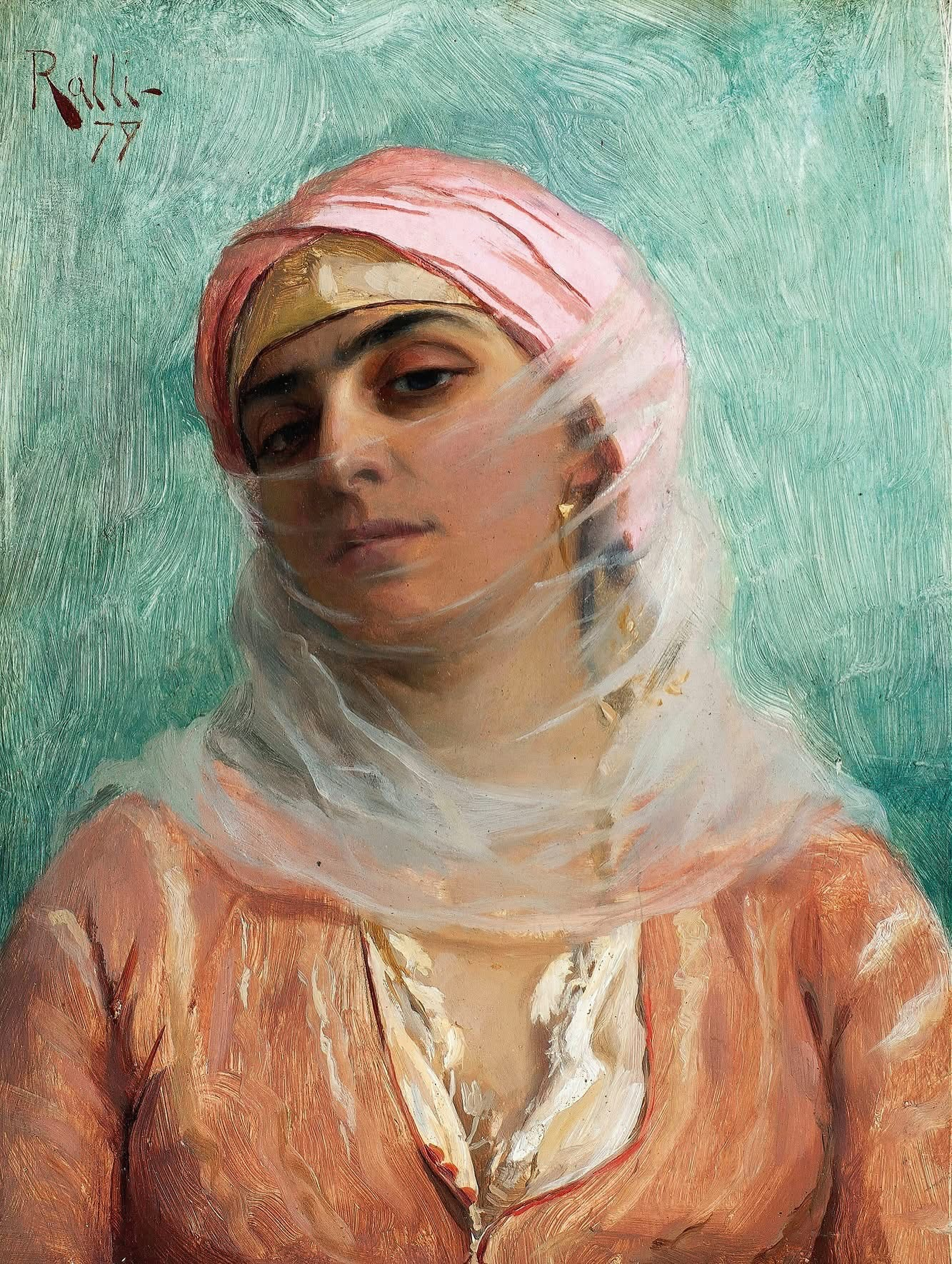
Young Ottoman Woman c. 1879

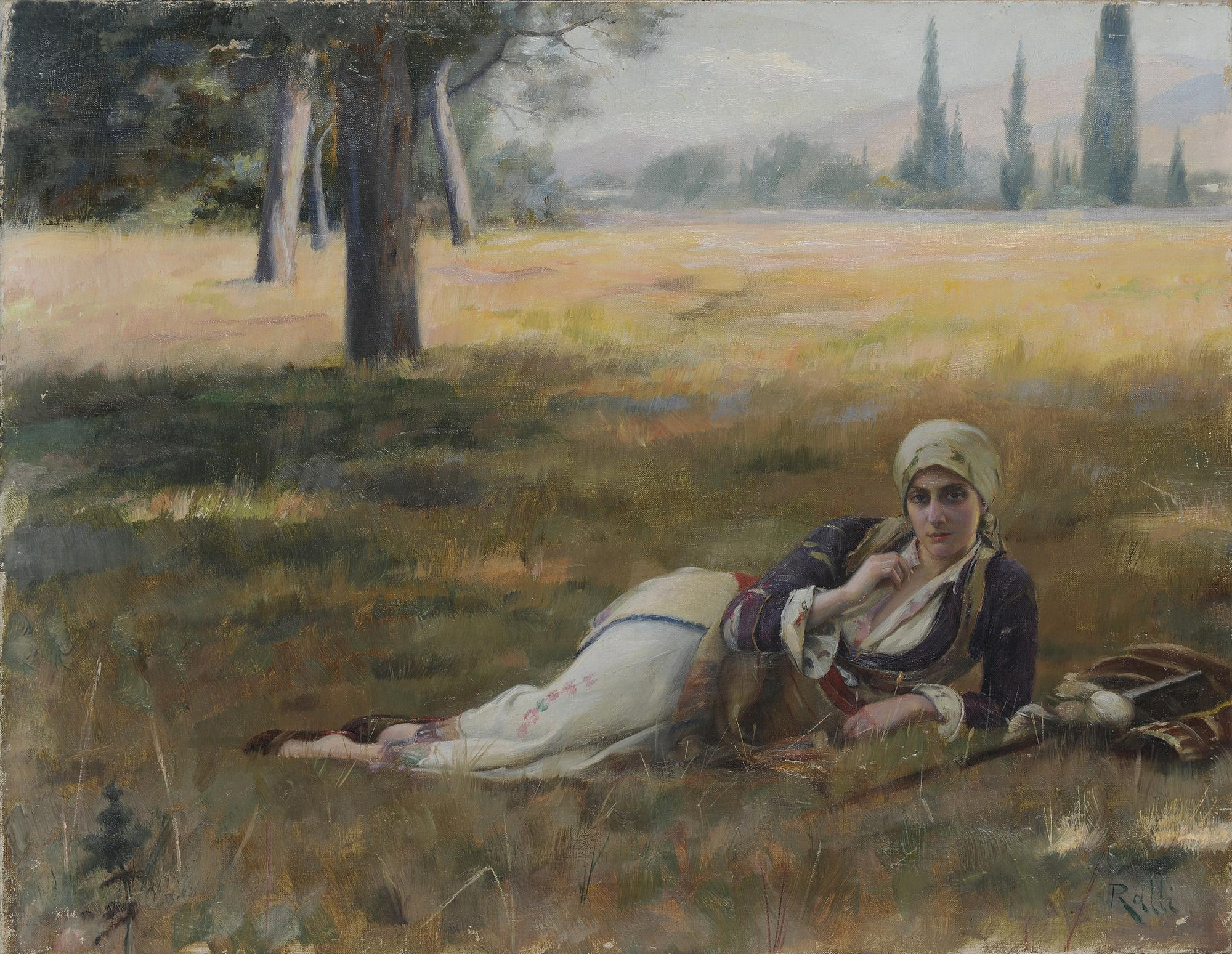
The Shepherdess c. 1873–1909

Rallis completed a wide assortment of Orientalist works and paintings of Greek everyday life. During his lifetime, a huge movement in Paris, France, known as Impressionism erupted starting in 1860. Rallis was in Paris from 1873 studying painting with Jean-Léon Gérôme. One year later, the revolutionary painter Claude Monet exhibited the Impressionist Sunrise in April 1874. Throughout his life, Rallis painted an immeasurable amount of impressionist paintings. Some of his works were impressionist hybrids where some, not all of the painting was Impressionist. In these works, the painter employed part of the brush work common in Impressionist works. In the Young Ottoman Woman

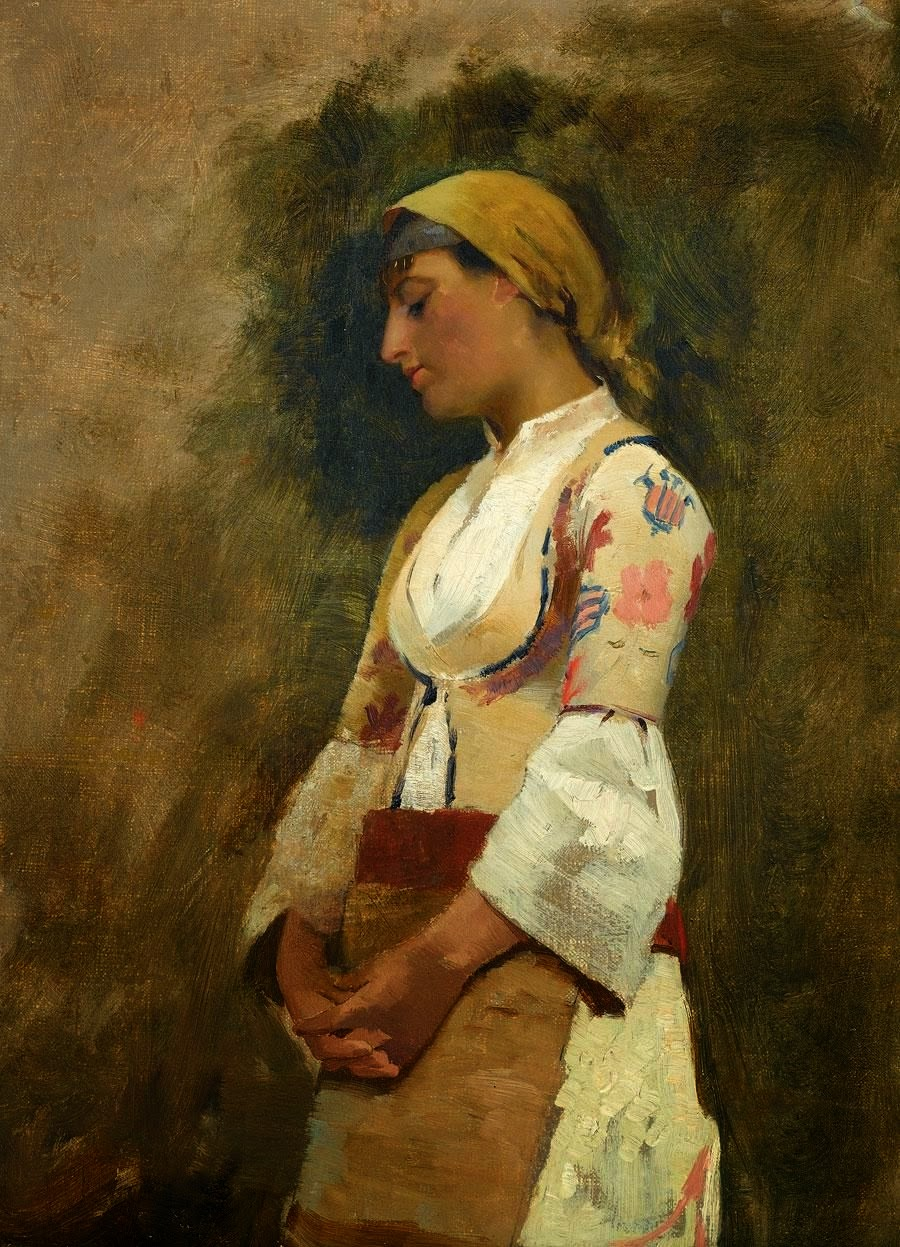
A Young Girl in Traditional Greek Dress c. 1873–1909

by Rallis the beautiful young woman wears a yashmak. The painting style of her face strictly adheres to traditional academic painting featuring a smooth refined surface where the brush work is invisible and creates a smooth glass like finish known as fini meaning finished following idealism. The background and her garment feature visible brush strokes common to impressionist paintings.

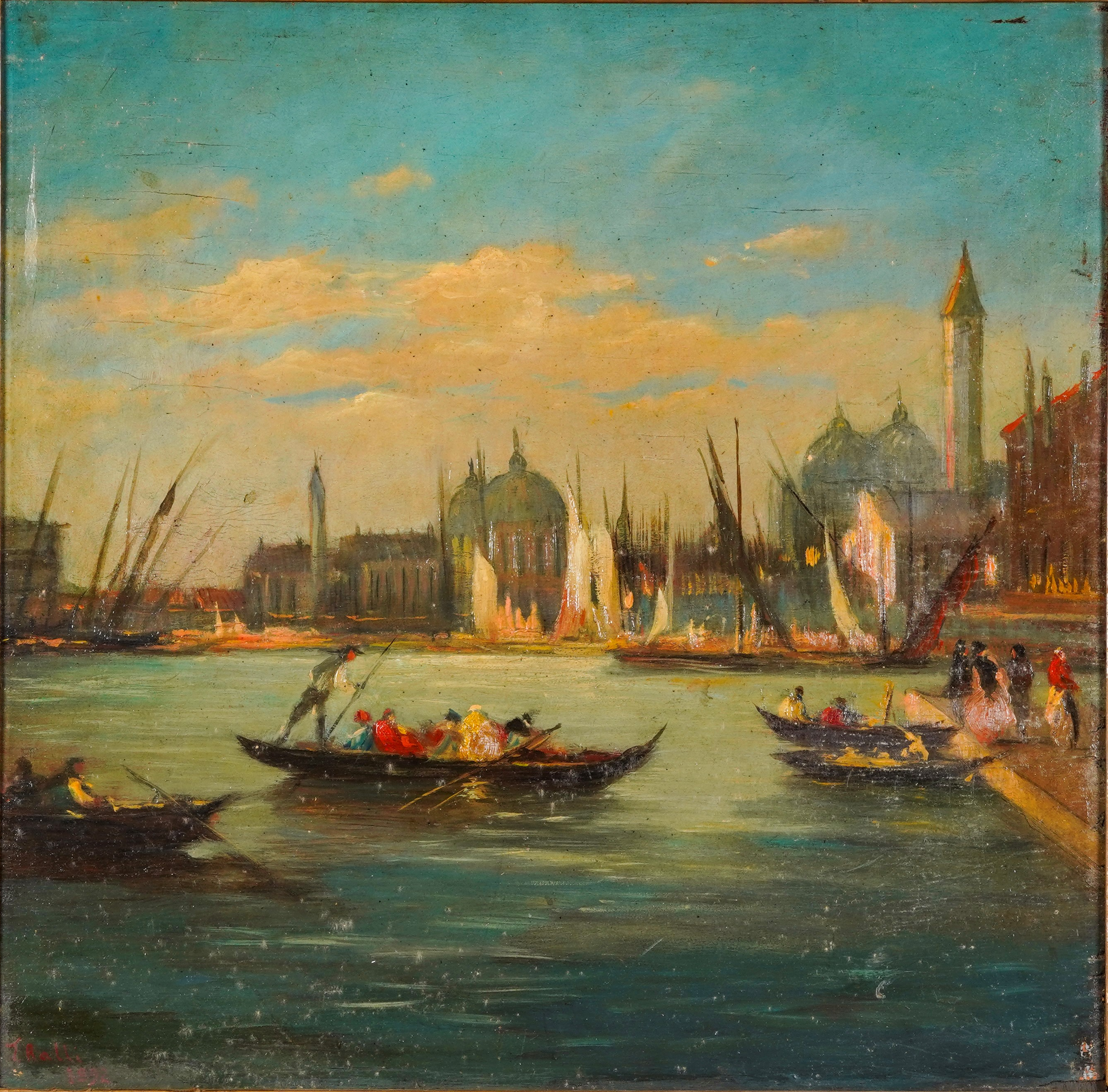
Venezia c. 1892

The painter had thorough knowledge of a method known as impasto. The paint was applied thickly prioritizing the texture of the paint creating an impressionist hybrid work common to the period. The Shepherdess is another work that features visible brush strokes in the landscape and parts of the females garment but also exhibits a smooth glass like finish on her face and anatomy. The paintings Venezia, A Young Girl in Traditional Greek Dress and On Shipboard are purely impressionist featuring visible brushstrokes creating a sense of motion and urgency.

== Prix Théodore Ralli ==
Ralli donated 15,000 francs to the Société des Artistes Français in 1909 after his death, and the interest was to be used as an annual prize. The prize was 420 francs in 1911. Today, there is still an endowment named after Théodore Ralli entitled Prix Théodore Ralli given by the Société des Artistes Français for about €150. The winner of the award in 2024 was Aleksandra Istorik.

== Gallery ==
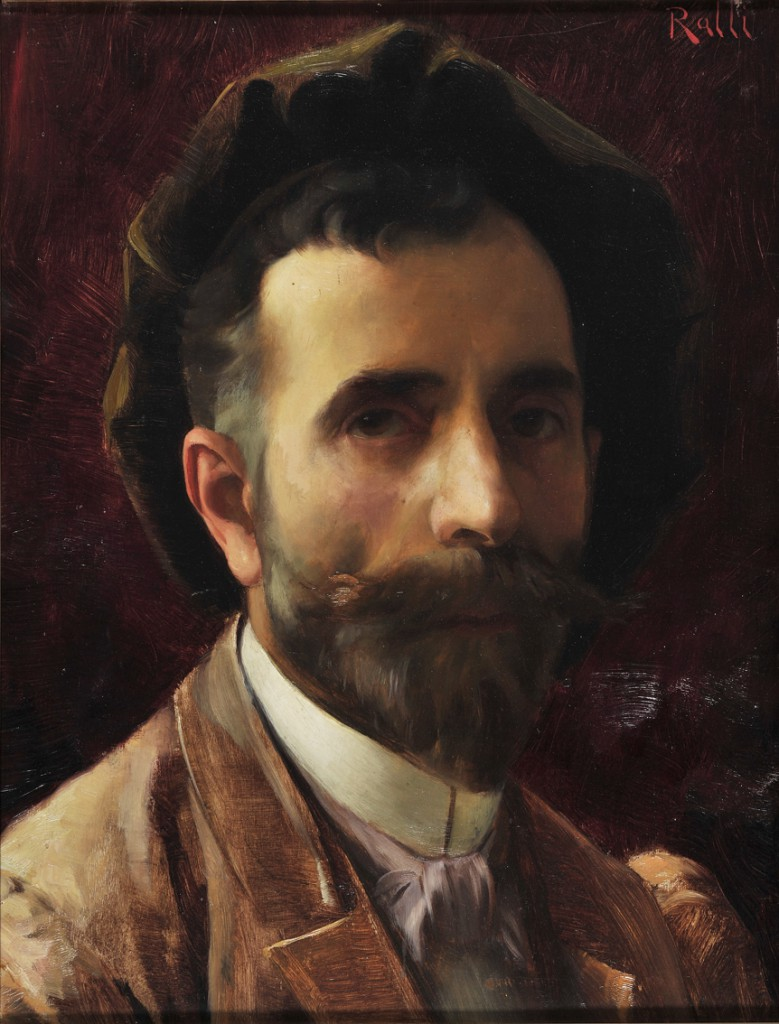
Self-portrait

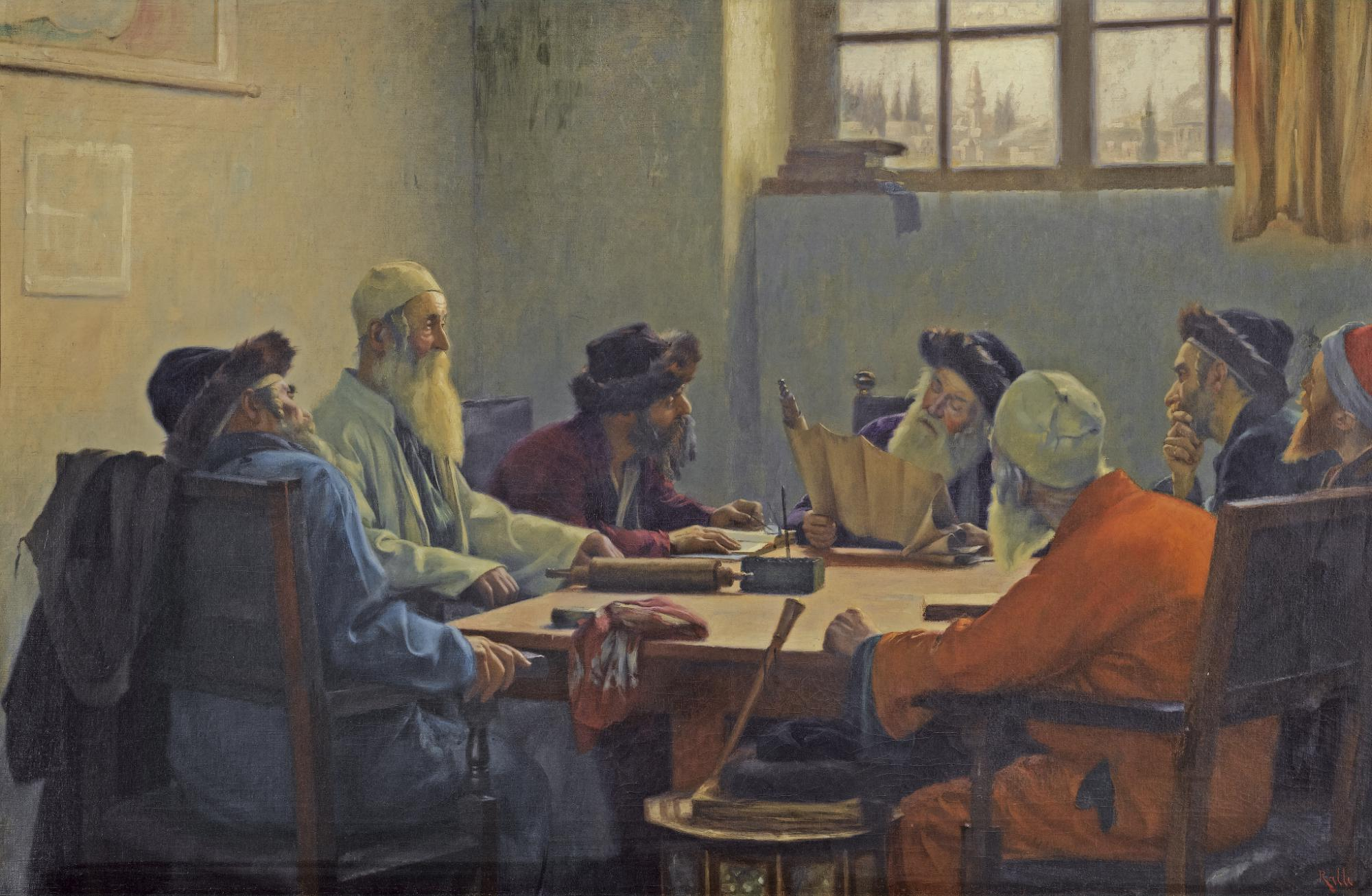
The Seven Rabbis in Jerusalem

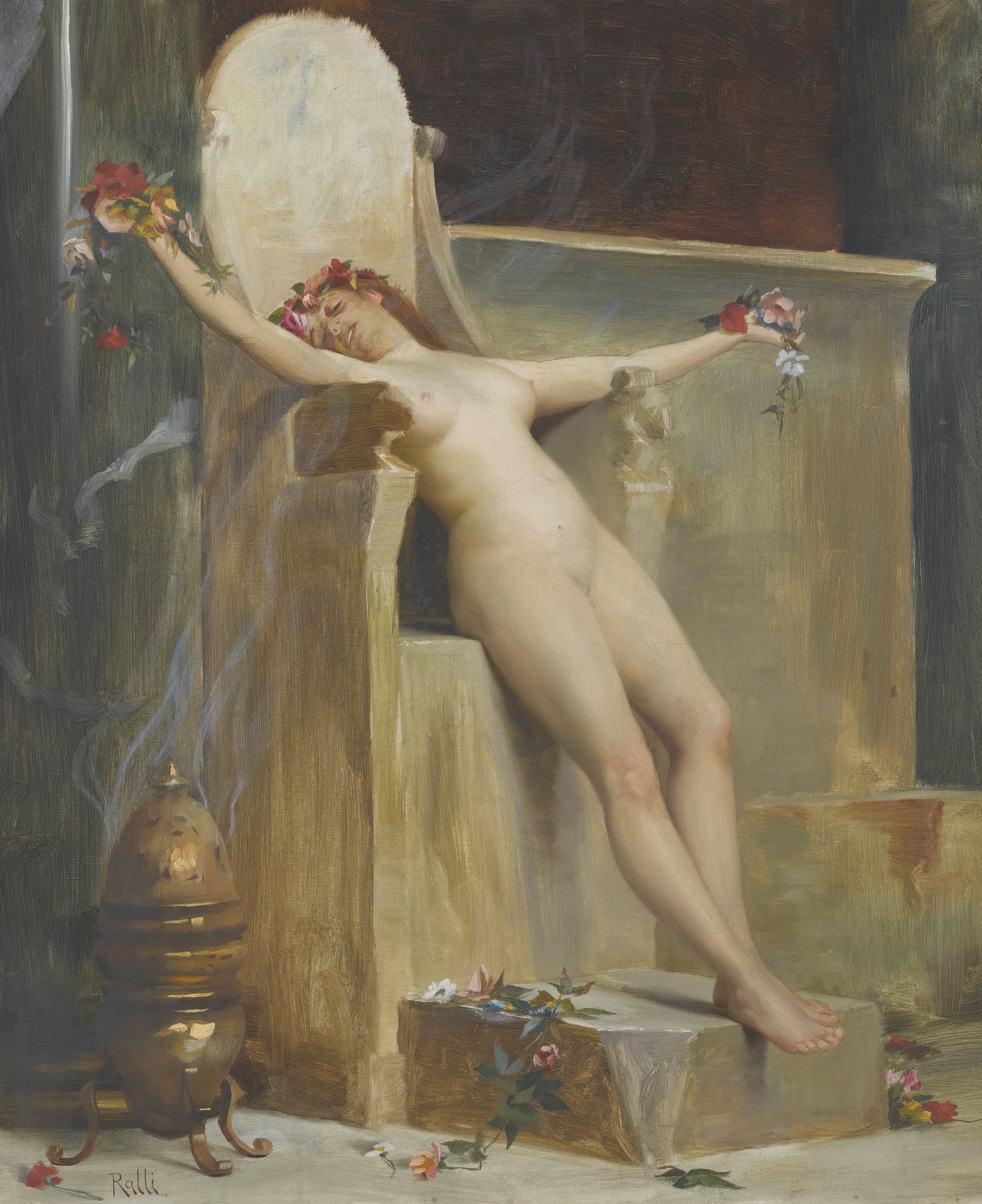
The Offering

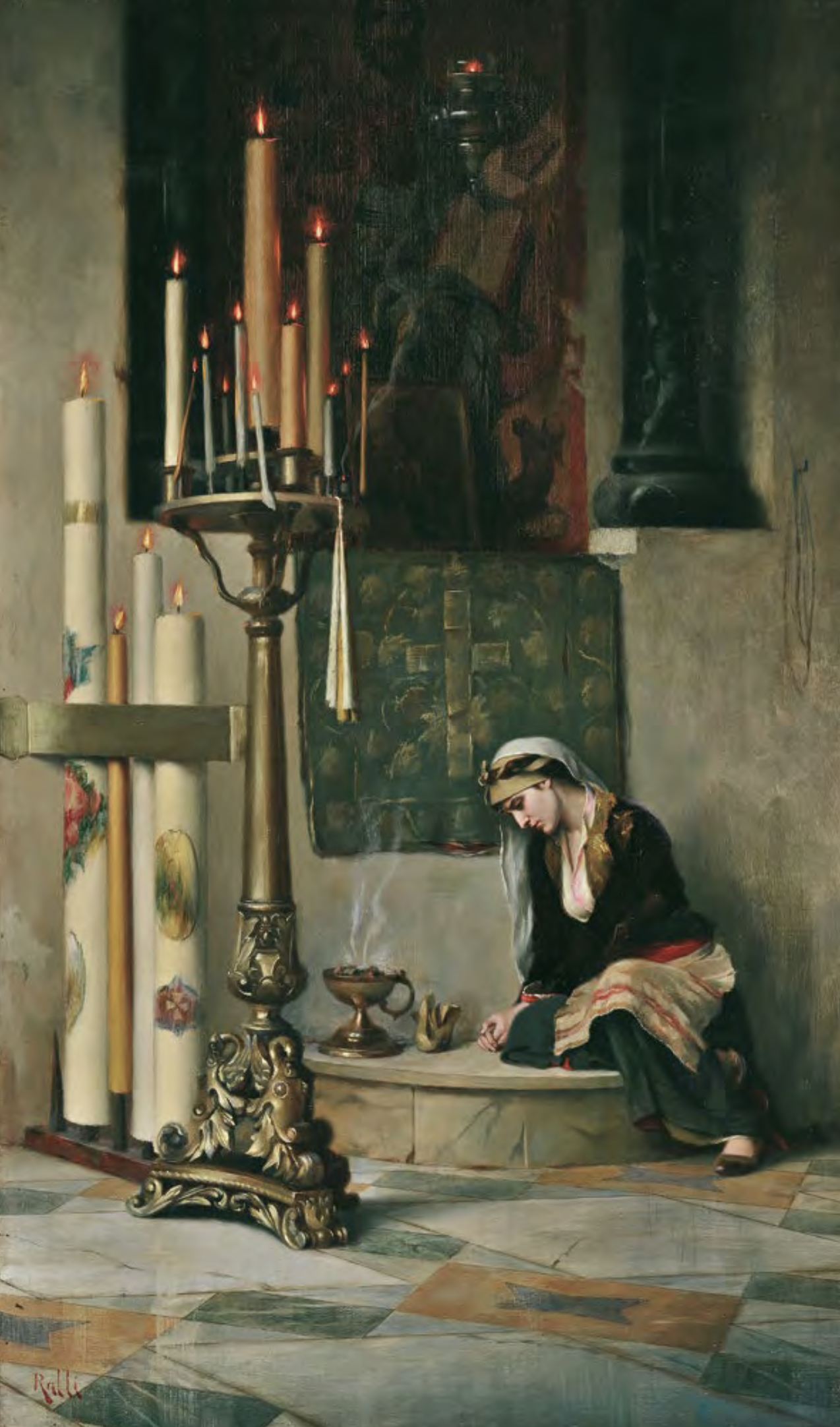
The Incense

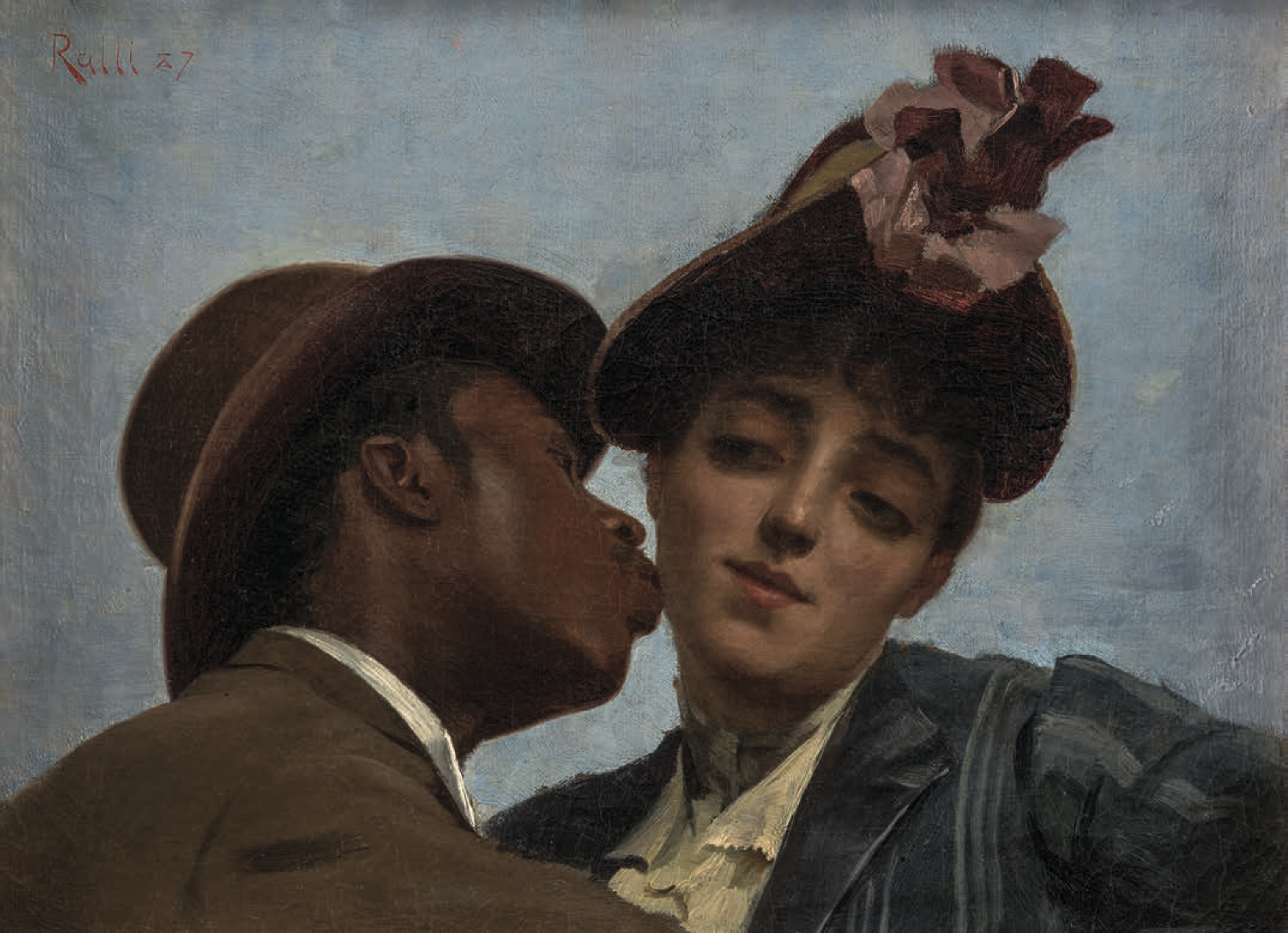
The Kiss (Ralli)

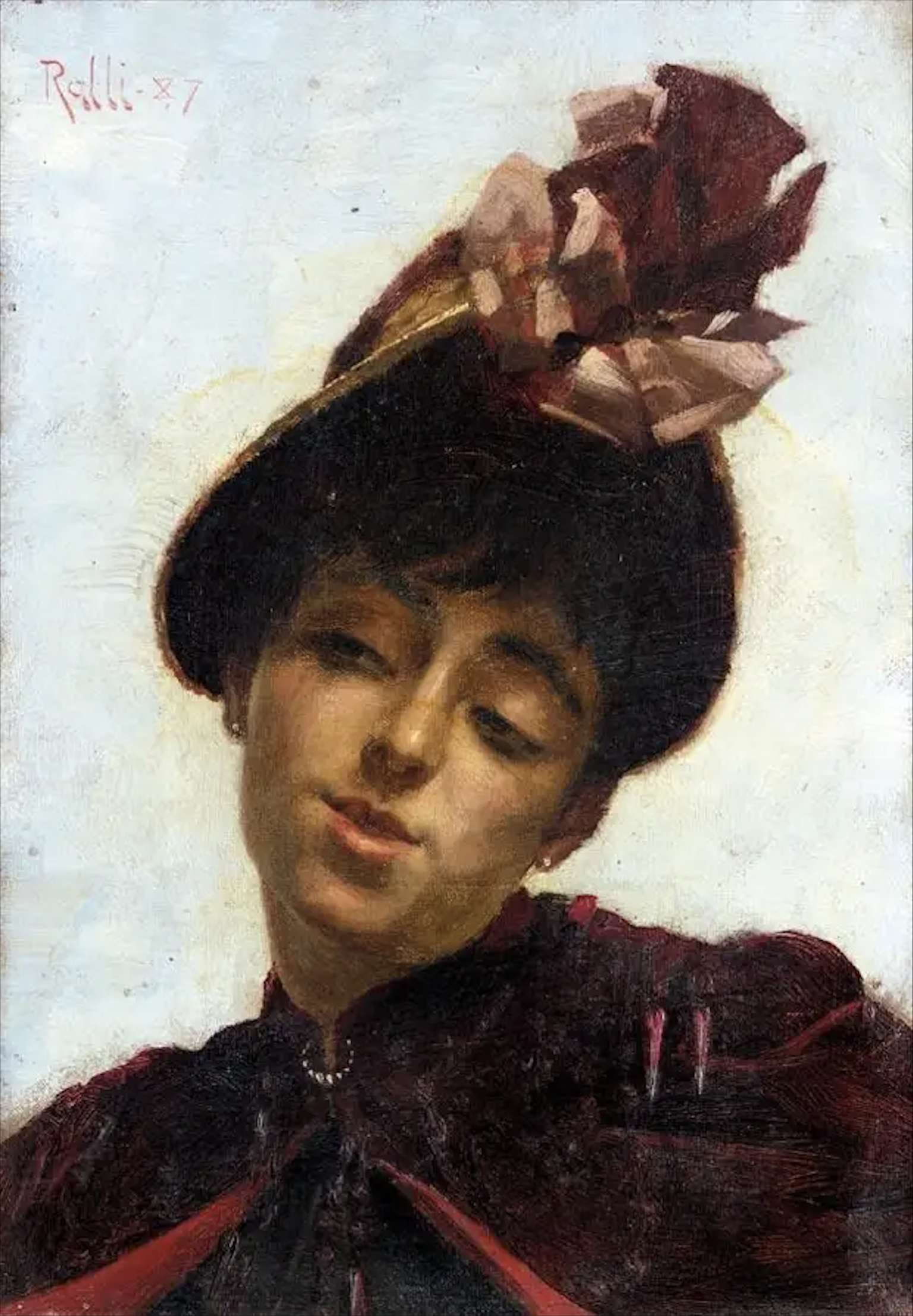
Portrait of a Young Woman

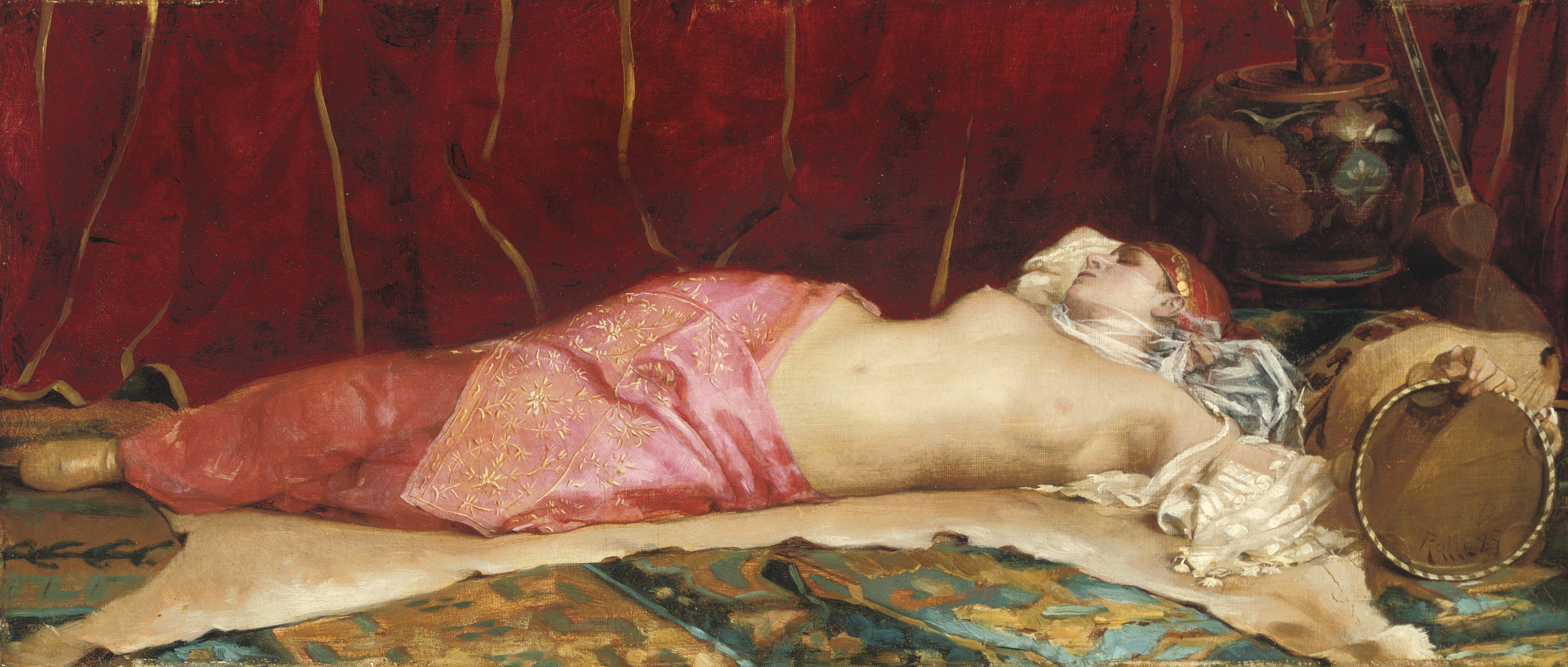
La Concubine

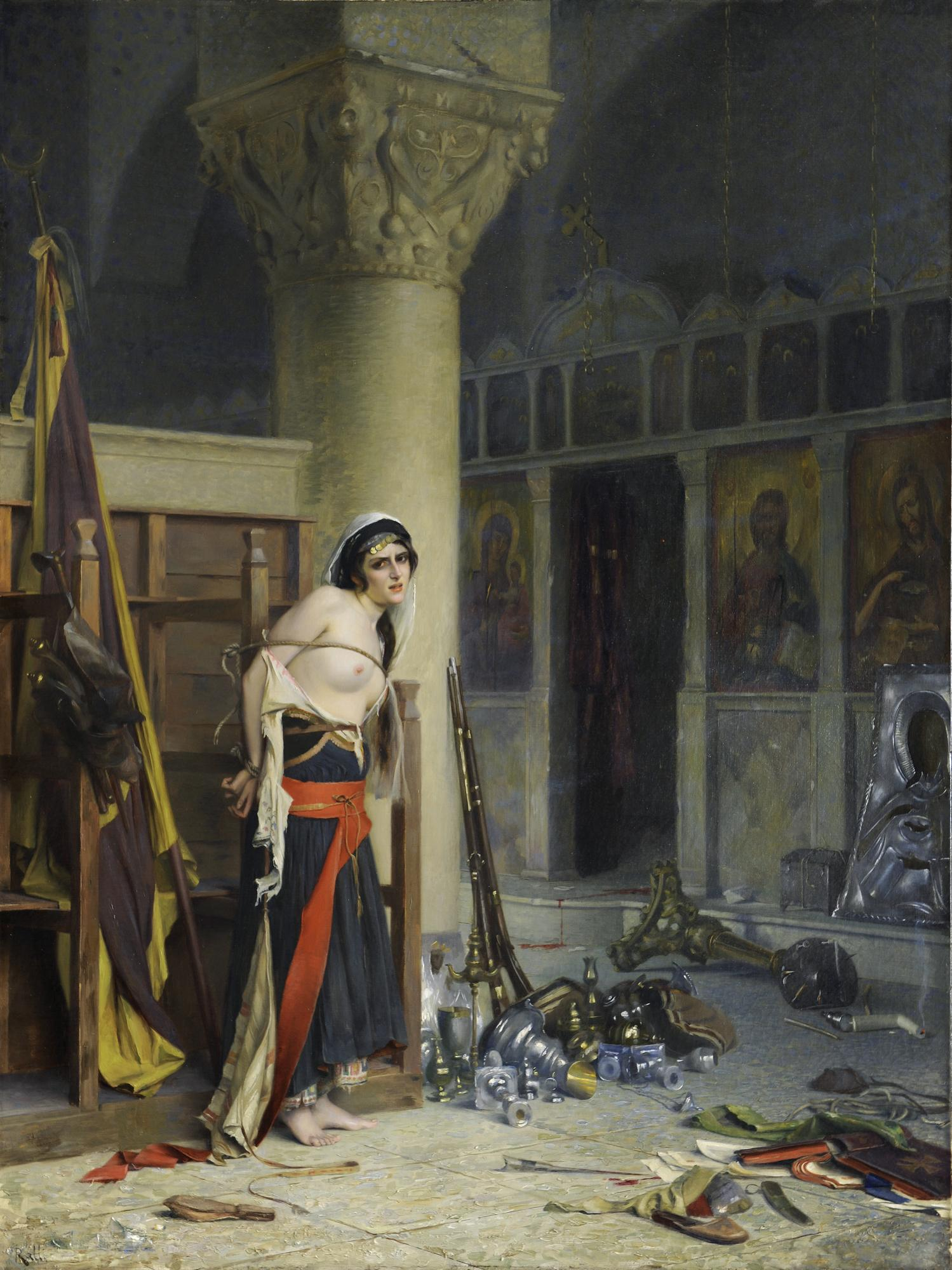
The Booty

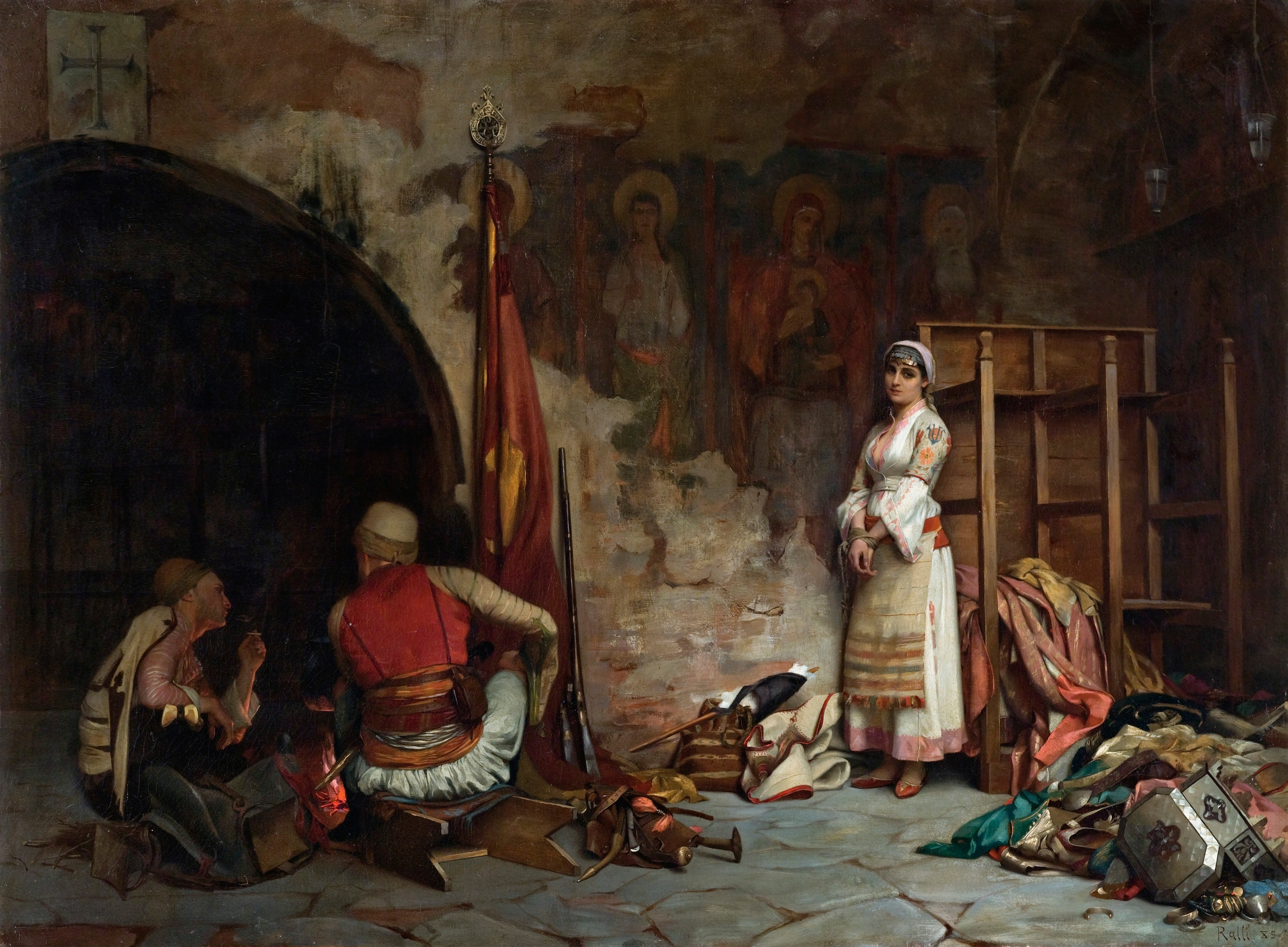
The Captive (Turkish Plunder) sold for $1,517,767 in 2007

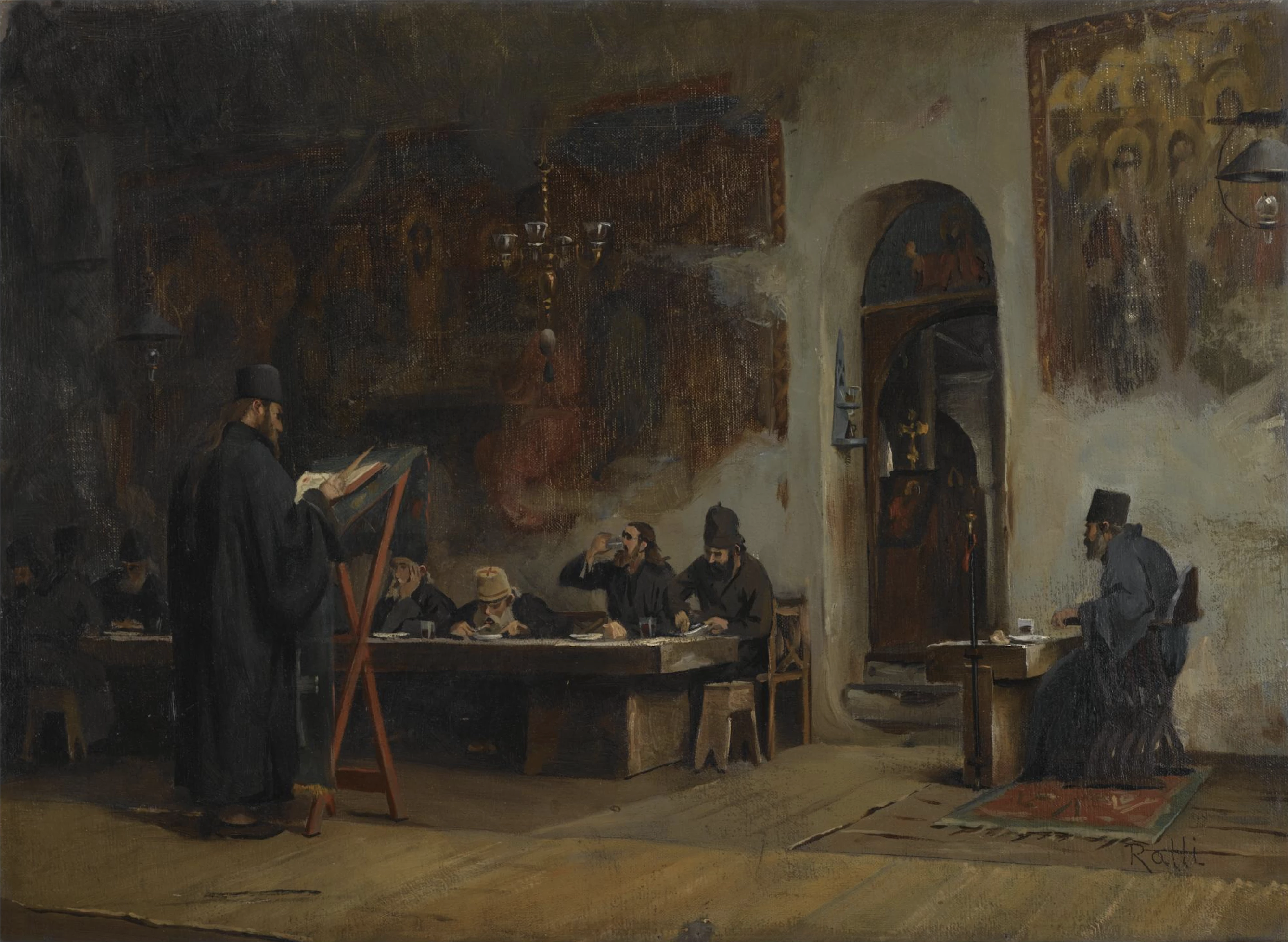
Refectory in a Greek Monastery of Mount Athos

== Paris Studio Addresses ==
- 10 Rue de Seine (1870s-1881)
- 11 Boulevard du Mont Parnasse (1876 until 1881)
- 30 Rue Bremontier (1881-1887)
- 6 Rue Aumont-Thiéville (1888 until Death)

== Museums ==
- Greek National Gallery, Athens
- Museum of the City of Athens, Athens, Greece
- Alpha Bank Art Collection, Athens, Greece
- Benaki Museum, Athens, Greece
- Municipal Gallery of Corfu, Corfu, Greece
- Municipal Art Gallery of Larissa
- Archbishop Makarios III Foundation Art Galleries Nicosia, Cyprus
- Leventis Gallery

== Selected works ==
- Praying in a Greek Church, Mount Parnassus (1876)
- Nasli Playing the Guitar (1877)
- An Egyptian Eunuque (1882) (oil on canvas)
- Boa Charmer in a Harem at Cairo (1882) (oil on canvas)
- The Sacred Serpent (1873-1882) (oil on canvas)
- Wake of the Pasha of Tangier (1884) (oil on canvas)
- Refectory in a monastery (Mount Athos) (1885) (oil on canvas)
- Reclining Odalisk (1885) (oil on canvas)
- Sleeping Concubine (1885) (oil on canvas)
- La Demoiselle (1887) (oil on canvas)
- Evening Prayers (1890) (oil on canvas)
- Praying before the Communion, Megara (1890) (oil on canvas) (presented at the Salon of 1890)
- In the mosque, 1891
- Seamstress (1895) (oil on canvas)
- Drama in the Harem (1908) (oil on canvas) (presented at the Salon of 1908)
- Jerusalem
- Before Solomon’s Wall in Jerusalem
- Woman in Arab Interior
- Girls in Orthodox Church
- Benediction (oil on canvas)
- Peasant Woman resting (watercolour and pencil)
- Girl in Church, Candle in Hand (oil on canvas)
- Two camels in the Desert (watercolour heightened with gouache)
- Ah ! Jealous Woman among Jealous Women (oil on canvas)
- The Sultan’s Favourite
- The Offering
- The Bath (oil on canvas)
- Young Beauty (oil on canvas)
- A Greek Beauty (watercolour on paper)
- Portrait of a Greek Girl (Helen of Megara) (oil on panel)
- Two Wise Old Men in Turbans (watercolour)
- Portrait of a Man in Green (oil on canvas on card)
- Sleeping in Church (oil on canvas)
- Entrance to Mary’s Tomb in Jerusalem (watercolour)
- Religious Instruction in an Algerian Mosque (oil on canvas)
- Girl Spinning Wool (oil on panel)
- Portrait of the Artist
- The Booty

== See also ==
- List of Orientalist artists
- Orientalism
- Periklis Tsirigotis
