= The Booty =

Painting by Théodore Jacques Ralli

- Le Butin (French), Η Λεία (Greek)
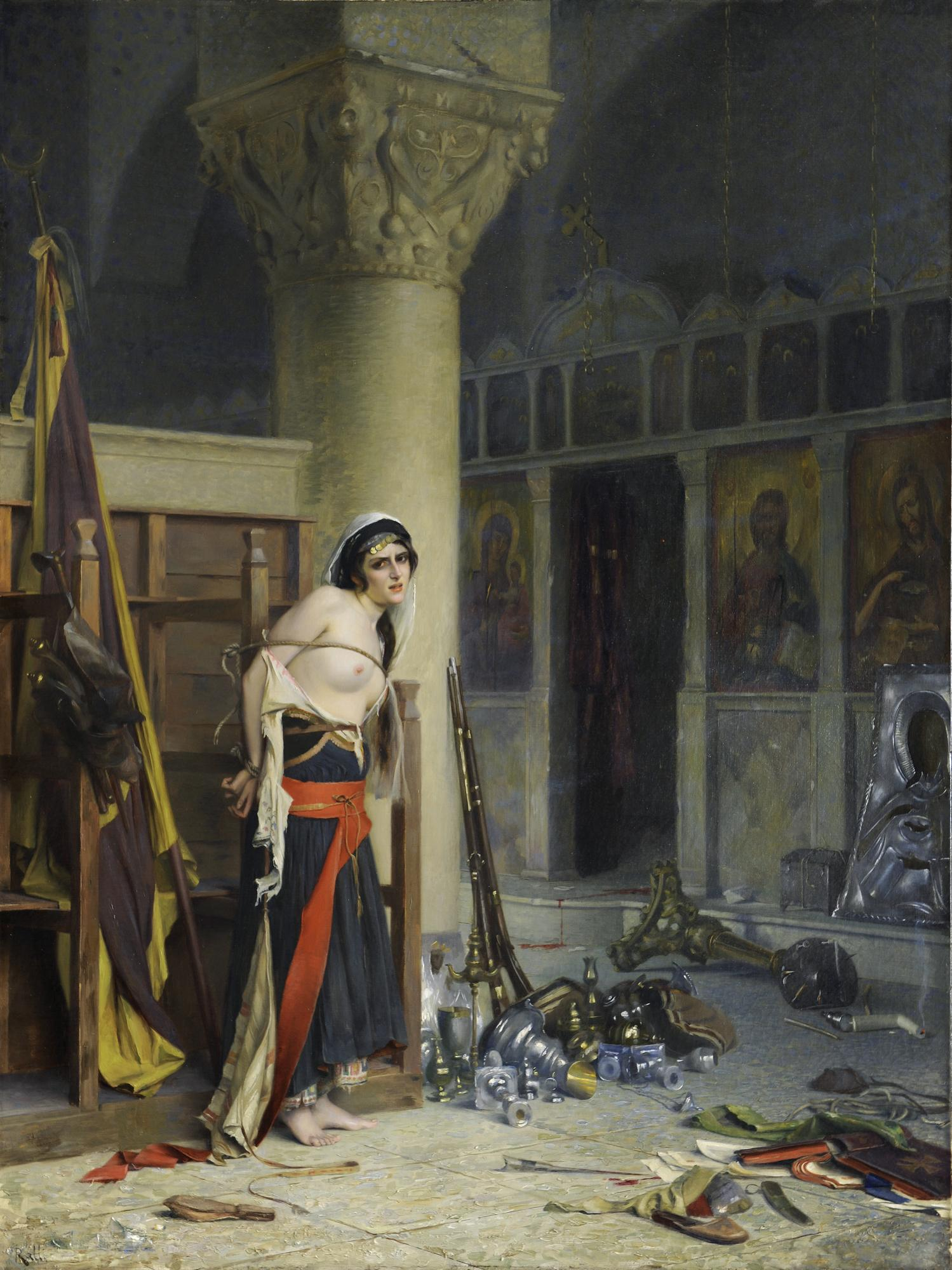
- The Booty
- Artist: Théodore Ralli
- Year: c. 1905
- Medium: Oil on canvas
- Movement: French School; Orientalism
- Subject: Tied up woman and other plunder
- Dimensions: 133 cm × 100 cm (52.3 in × 39.3 in)
- Location: National Gallery of Athens, Athens, Greece
- Owner: Ε. Koutlidis Foundation
- Accession: Κ.712
- Website: Museum website

The Booty is a painting created by Greek painter Theodorus Rallis. He was a watercolourist and draughtsman creating portraits, local figures, architectural subjects, interiors, and genre works. Rallis was best known for his orientalist paintings. Theodorus was trained in France by Jean-Léon Gérôme and Jean-Jules-Antoine Lecomte du Nouy. Both of the painters were Orientalists. Jean-Léon was a professor at the École des Beaux-Arts and also an academist. Theodorus acquired knowledge of both academic art and orientalism from his professors. He first exhibited his work at the Salon of 1875 in Paris and was a member of the Société des Artistes Français. Rallis also frequently exhibited works at the Royal Academy in London from 1879 onwards. There is no exact inventory of the painters' existing catalog, but Artnet has tracked over 217 paintings and 15 works on paper attributed to Rallis. In 1900, Rallis was awarded the decoration of the Knight of the Legion of Honor by France.

Common artistic themes of Ottoman Oppression towards Greeks and other inhabitants of the empire recurred throughout the 19th century. In 1824, The Massacre at Chios was completed by French painter Eugène Delacroix, and it features the horrors the Greek people endured during the 1822 Chios massacre. Although Rallis was born in Constantinople, his family was originally from Chios. Another French painter named Constance Blanchard, painted Greek Women of Souli Running to Their Death in 1838, featuring Greek women and children jumping to their deaths to avoid capture, enslavement, rape, and lifelong torture.

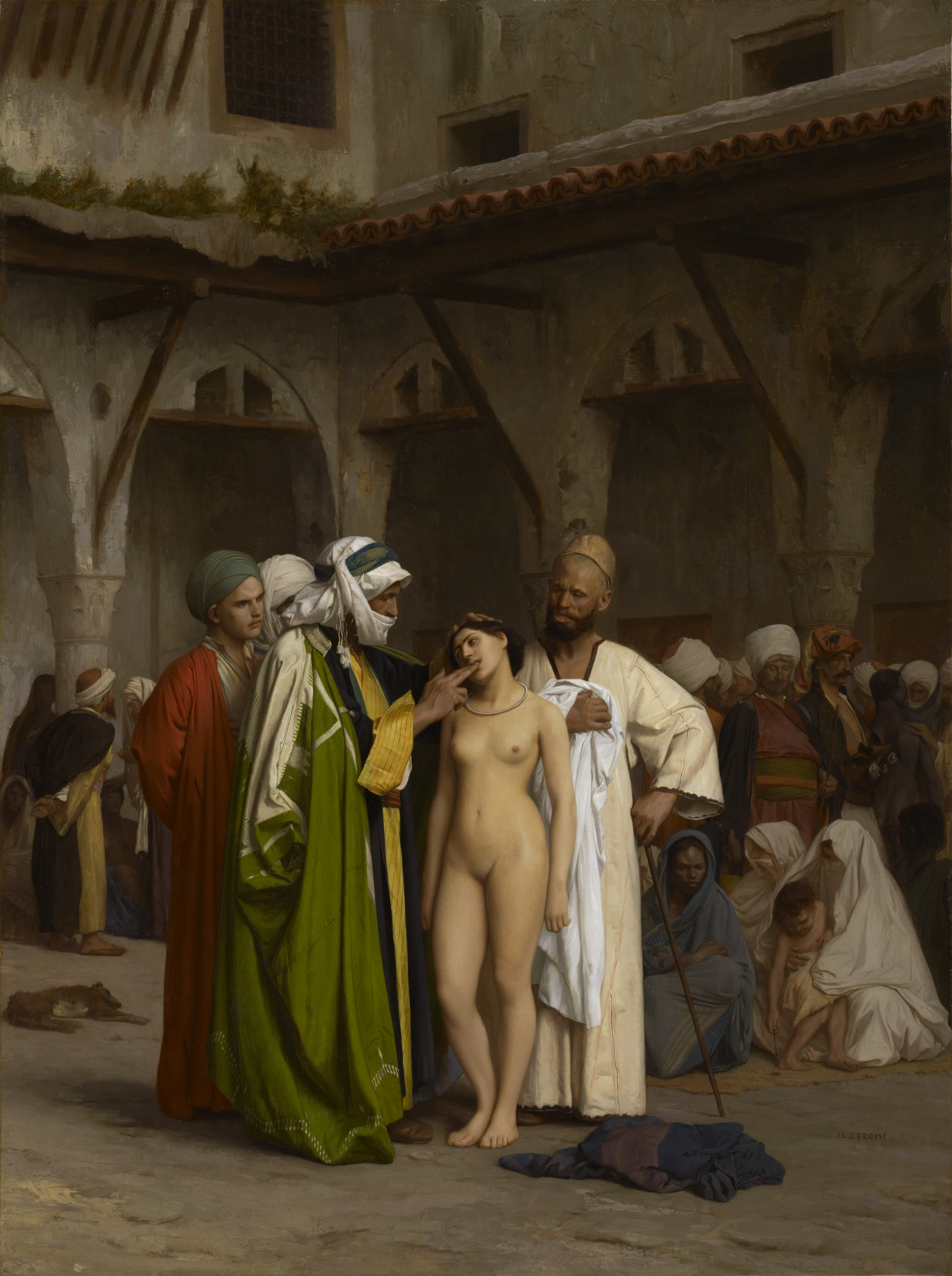
The Slave Market by Jean-Léon Gérôme (1866), an earlier work finished by one of Ralli's teachers.

Hiram Powers completed The Greek Slave statue in 1843, which was a part of the Greek Slave Movement in the United States. Powers was also exposed to the slave trade while traveling to Europe and visiting Ottoman territories. The sculptor eventually settled in Florence, Italy, where the work was completed. Powerful visual tools expressing harsh Greek oppression continued to flourish towards the second half of the 19th century. Rallis teacher Jean-Léon Gérôme painted The Slave Market in 1866. Greece was constantly at war with the Ottoman Empire, and in 1878 The Epirus Revolt erupted. Seven years later, Rallis traveled through the Ottoman Empire to visit Mount Athos in 1885, where he was motivated to complete many works. Two works he completed that same year feature similar-aged religious frescoes entitled The Captive (Ralli) and Refectory in Mount Athos. Around 1905, Rallis completed The Booty which is part of the collection of the Ε. Koutlidis Foundation and is on display at the National Gallery of Athens. Otto Pilny completed a similar work in 1910 entitled Slave Market.

== Description ==
The Booty was completed around 1905 and is made with oil paint on canvas. The height of the work is 133 cm (52.3 in) and the width: 100 cm (39.3 in). The scene is dramatic, centered on a Greek woman half-stripped and bound, potentially ravished, in front of the sanctuary gate in the interior of an Orthodox church. The church has been ransacked, presumably by Turks. Various paraphernalia of worship have been ruined or wrecked, including a bible, and formerly revered items of silver and gold are piled on the floor next the captive woman. Several splashes of blood are on the floor. The bandit's weapons are also visible, stacked or hung with deliberation, implying they (and possibilities of further violence) are still near at hand even though they are not in the scene. The woman bears an expression of fear and anger, and her gaze is directly towards the viewer, forcing the audience to feel they are part of the scene rather than just passively observing it. The work follows the French academic style and was influenced by photography. Brown tones dominate the work, while red is the only bright color. The painter signed the work in the lower left corner.

The Booty directly depicts what at the time was contemporary abuse of Greeks under the Ottoman Empire. Concern in Western Europe for the exploitation of Greek and other Southeastern European peoples by the Ottomons had grown since the early 19th century. Attention on the matter had been raised by Joseph Stephanini's book The Personal Narrative of the Sufferings of J. Stephanini . Rallis traveled around the Ottoman Empire, witnessing the slave trade firsthand. In 1885, he completed The Captive which features a similar theme.

In the 1906 Salon catalogue, when the work was first exhibited, Rallis added the following verse emphasizing the girl's anger:

Chained and magnificent, among the trophies of weapons,
her eyes full of hatred shed no tears...
The Greek woman with her forehead held high
defies the Turkish victor,
she will take revenge for her brothers,
crushing his heart!

== Prequel Painting ==
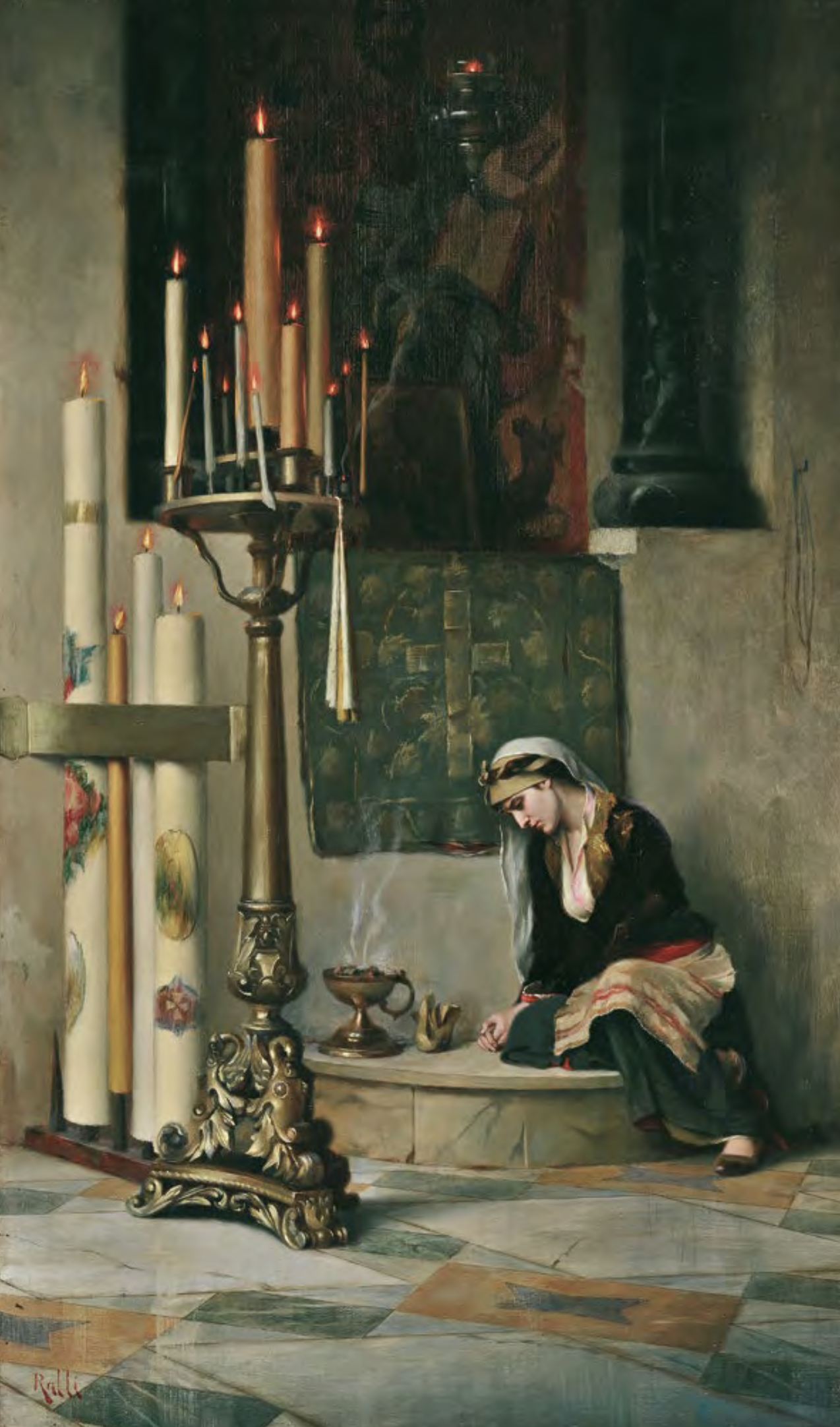
The Incense by Theodorus Rallis (1907) similar to The Booty

In 1907, Rallis presented The Incense, whose central character, location, and accoutrements strongly resemble those in The Booty, suggesting the latter work depicts the same person and church as in The Booty shortly before the Ottoman attack. The work is also part of the collection of the National Gallery of Athens in Athens, Greece along with The Booty.

== Gallery ==
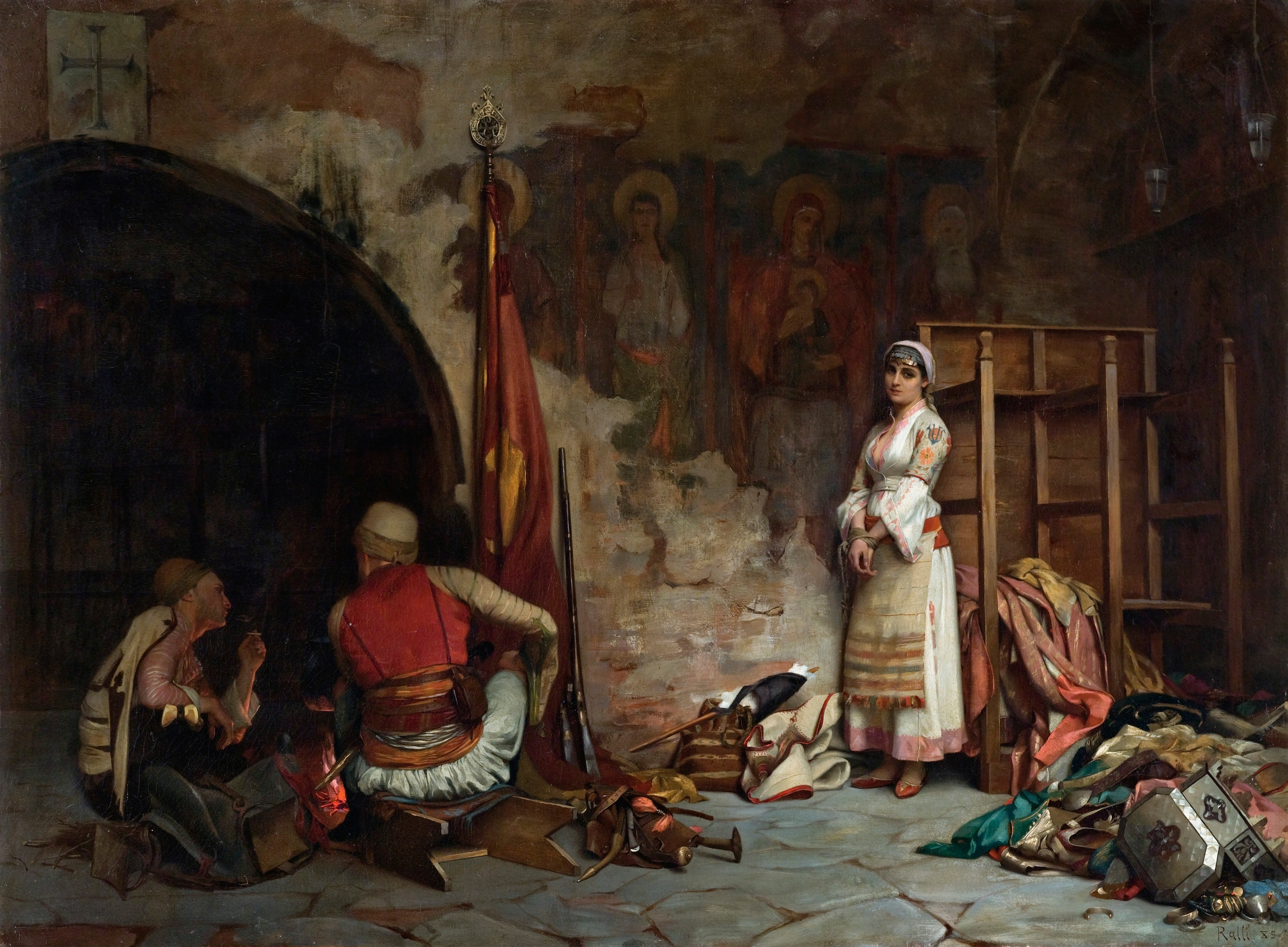
The Captive (Ralli) by Theodorus Rallis c. 1885

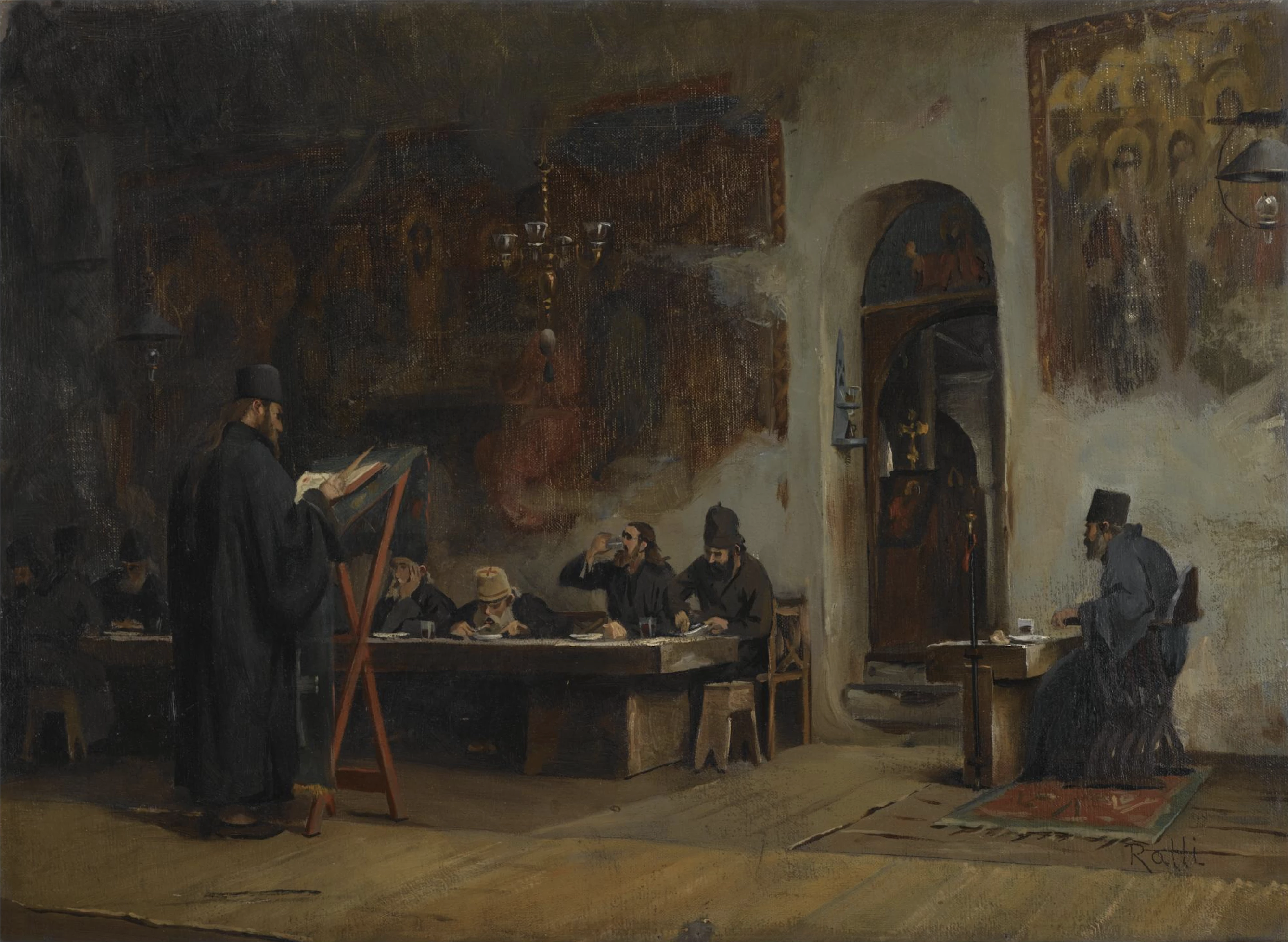
Refectory in Mount Athos by Theodorus Rallis c. 1885

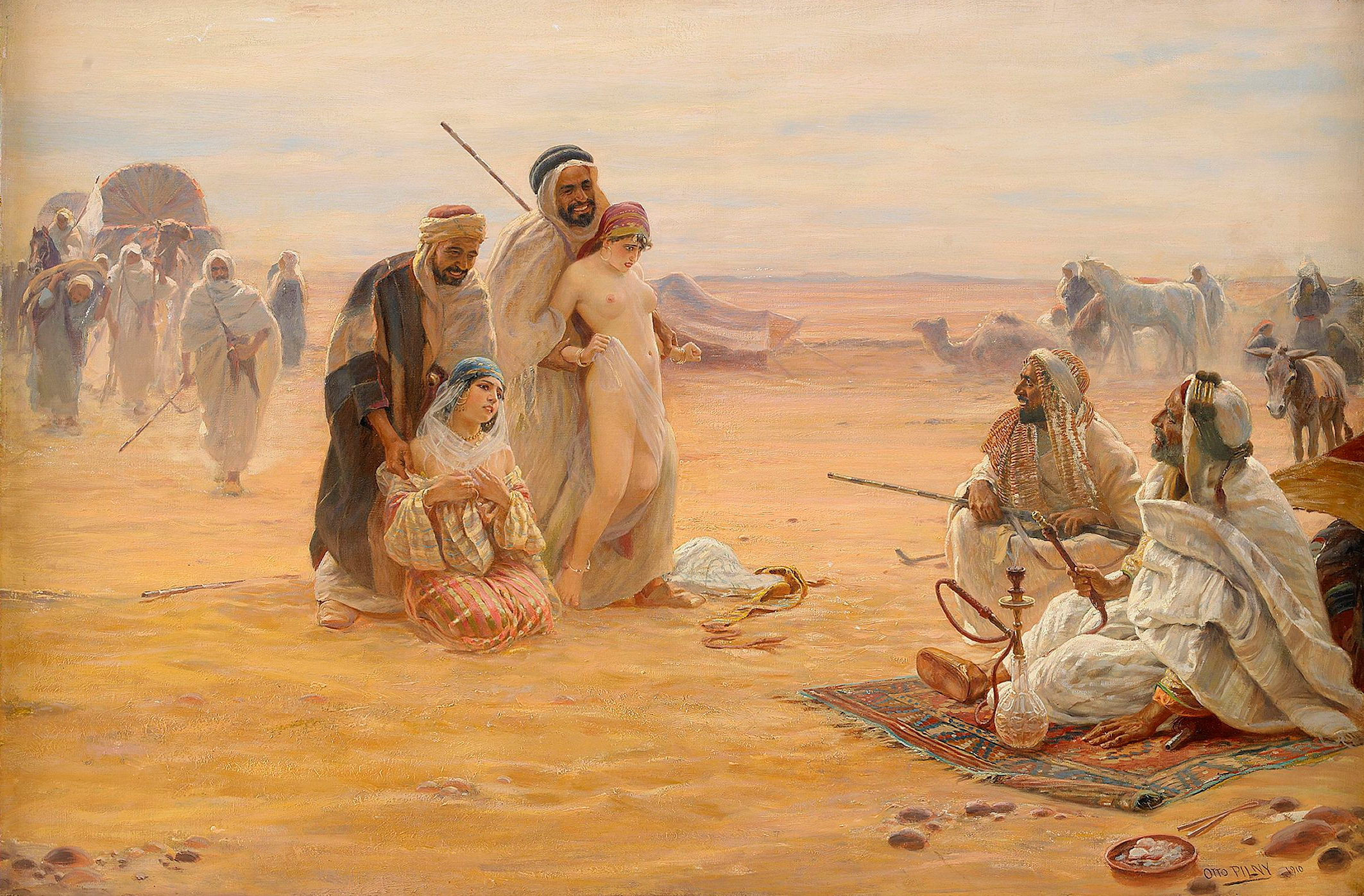
The Slave Market by Otto Pilny c. 1910

=== Earlier Works Featuring Greek Oppression ===
The Massacre at Chios by Eugène Delacroix c. 1824

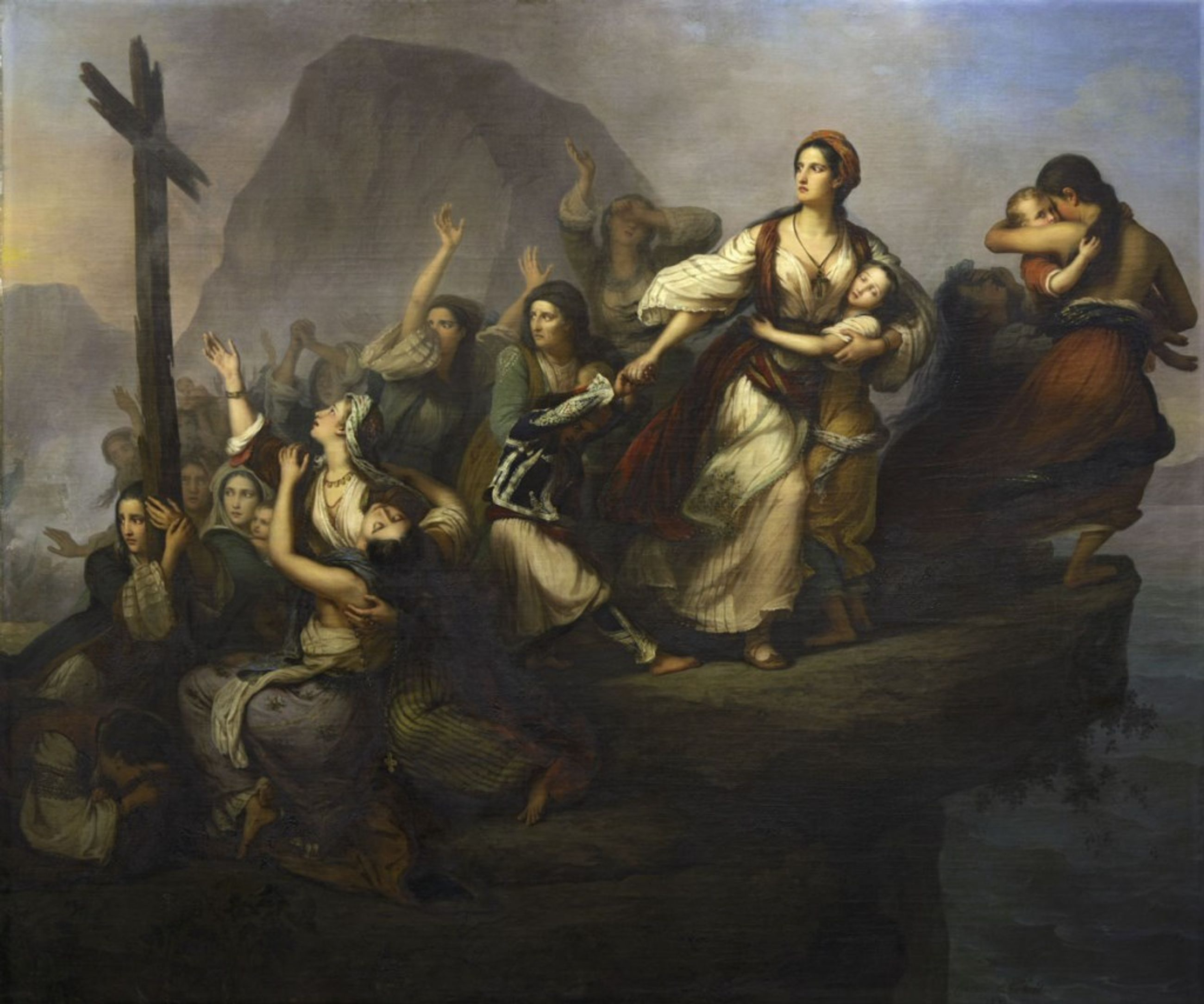
Greek Women of Souli Running to Their Death by Constance Blanchard c. 1838

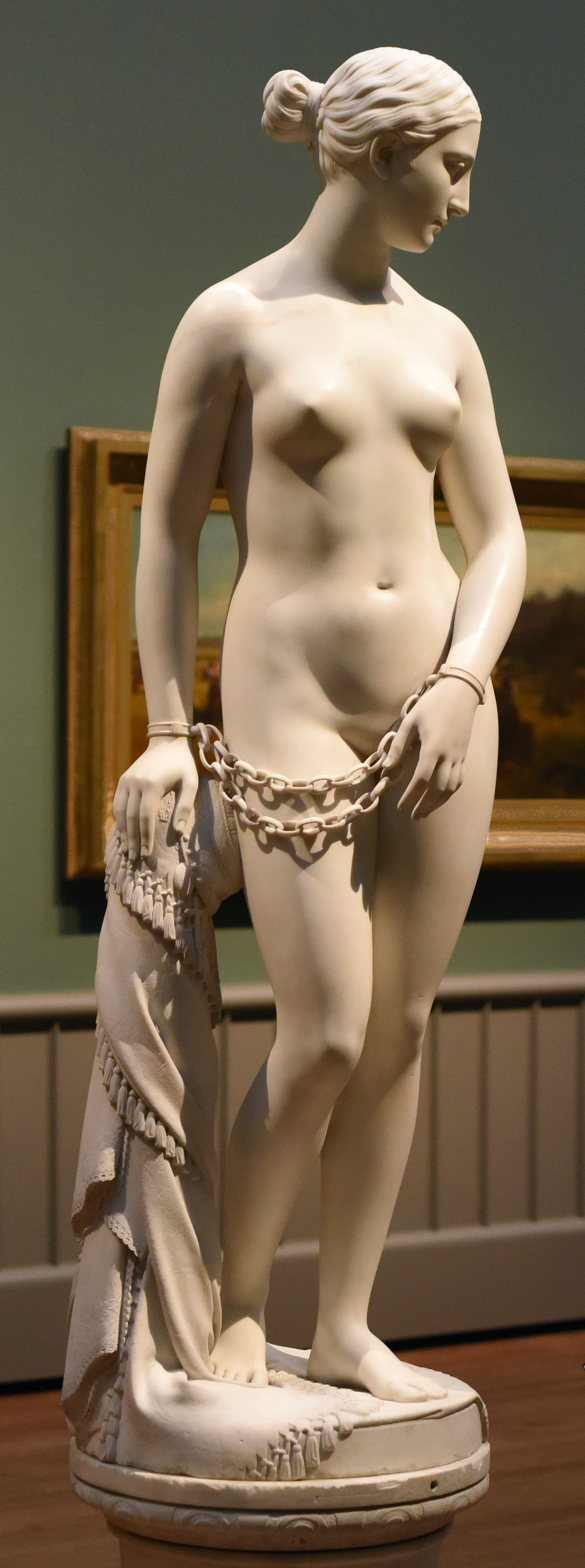
The Greek Slave by Hiram Powers c. 1843

== Bibliography ==
- Francis, John Edward (October 23, 1909). "The death in Paris is announced of Théodore Jacques. Ralli". The Athenaeum Journal of English and Foreign Literature, Science, the Fine Arts, Music and the Drama. (4278). London, UK: John C. Francis and J. Edward Francis. "The death in Paris is announced of Théodore Jacques Ralli, a naturalized Frenchman, the son of Greek parents. He was born at Constantinople, and studied under Géröme and at the École des Beaux-Arts. He first exhibited at the Salon in 1875. He was a member of the Société des Artistes Français. He devoted himself largely to Oriental scenes, and one of his two pictures in this year's Salon was entitled Circassienne au Bain. He was for some years—1879 to 1883-an exhibitor at the Royal Academy."
- Plaka, Marina-Lambraki; Polyzou, Olga Mentzafou; Katsanaki, Maria; Kaloudi, Zina; Tsikouta, Lina; Giannoudaki, Tonia; Zervou, Artemis; Agathonikou, Efi; Cassimatis, Marilena Z. (2011). Στα άδυτα της Εθνικής Πινακοθήκης Άγνωστοι θησαυροί από τις Συλλογές της [Unknown Treasures from the National Gallery Collections Duration: 20/10/2011 – 8 /1/2012] (PDF) (in Greek). Athens, Greece: National Gallery of Athens and National Bank of Greece. ISBN 978-960-7791-50-4.
- Salahi, Katherine (2011). Knowledge is Light: Travellers in the Near East Theodore Ralli’s Diary on his Travel to Athos (1885). Oakville, CT: Oxbow Books. doi:10.2307/j.ctvh1dwhn.13.
- Kanafani, Fatenn Mostafa (2020). Modern Art in Egypt Identity and Independence, 1850–1936. New York, NY: I.B. Tauris. ISBN 9781838601102.
