= Chian diaspora =

Part of the Greek diaspora from the island of Chios

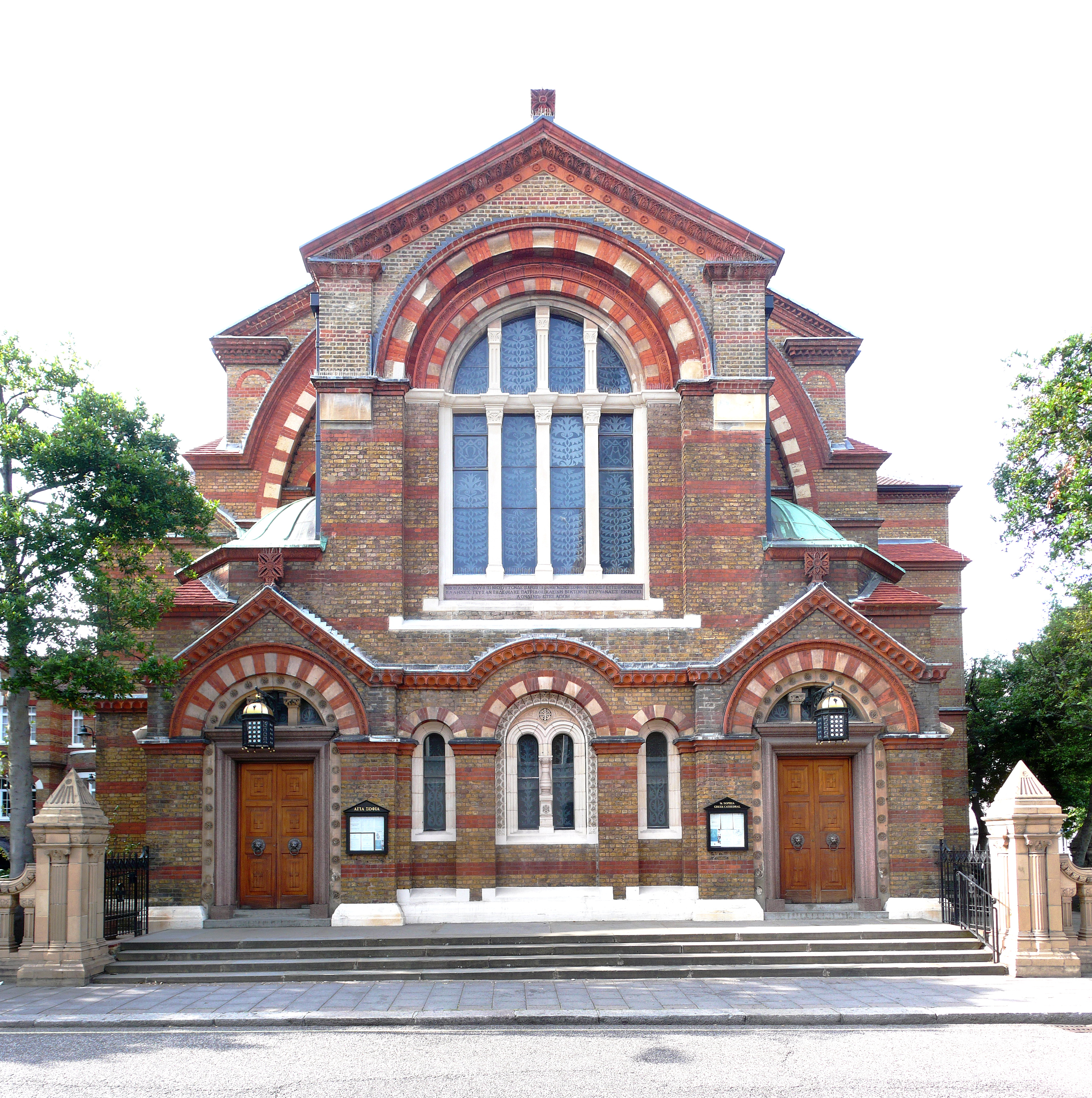
The Orthodox cathedral in Moscow Road, London

The Chian diaspora was the dispersal of most of the remaining population of the Aegean island of Chios, after the massacre of 1822. It is one part of the larger Greek diaspora.

== Creation ==
At the beginning of the 19th century, Chios was the home of many merchant and ship-owning families, who earned great wealth by shipping grain from Ukraine to western Europe and manufactured goods back from industrialised Europe to the Ottoman Empire, of which Greece was a province. These families, like most of the population of Chios, were of mixed Greek and Genoese descent.

This ended with the Chios Massacre of 1822, with much of the population of the island being killed or enslaved. 20,000 were exiled. Many of the refugees moved to other Aegean islands, particularly Psara and Syros. The wealthier were better able to move further away, to where they would be safe from further massacres. A number of influential members of the merchant and ship-owning families were, in the course of their business, absent from Chios at the time of the massacre, and remained in possession of their ships and their trade goods. They were able to settle in new homes, generally in cities where they were trading, notably Odessa, Alexandria, Trieste, Marseille, London and Liverpool.

Long writes "We calculate that the heart of the Chian and Phanariot community in England never numbered much more than about 600-700 at any one time with perhaps another 500 or so throughout the rest of Europe." Some of those who were enslaved by the Turks later had their freedom purchased by relatives who had escaped, and were able to join their families in their new homes.

== Some notable families of the diaspora ==
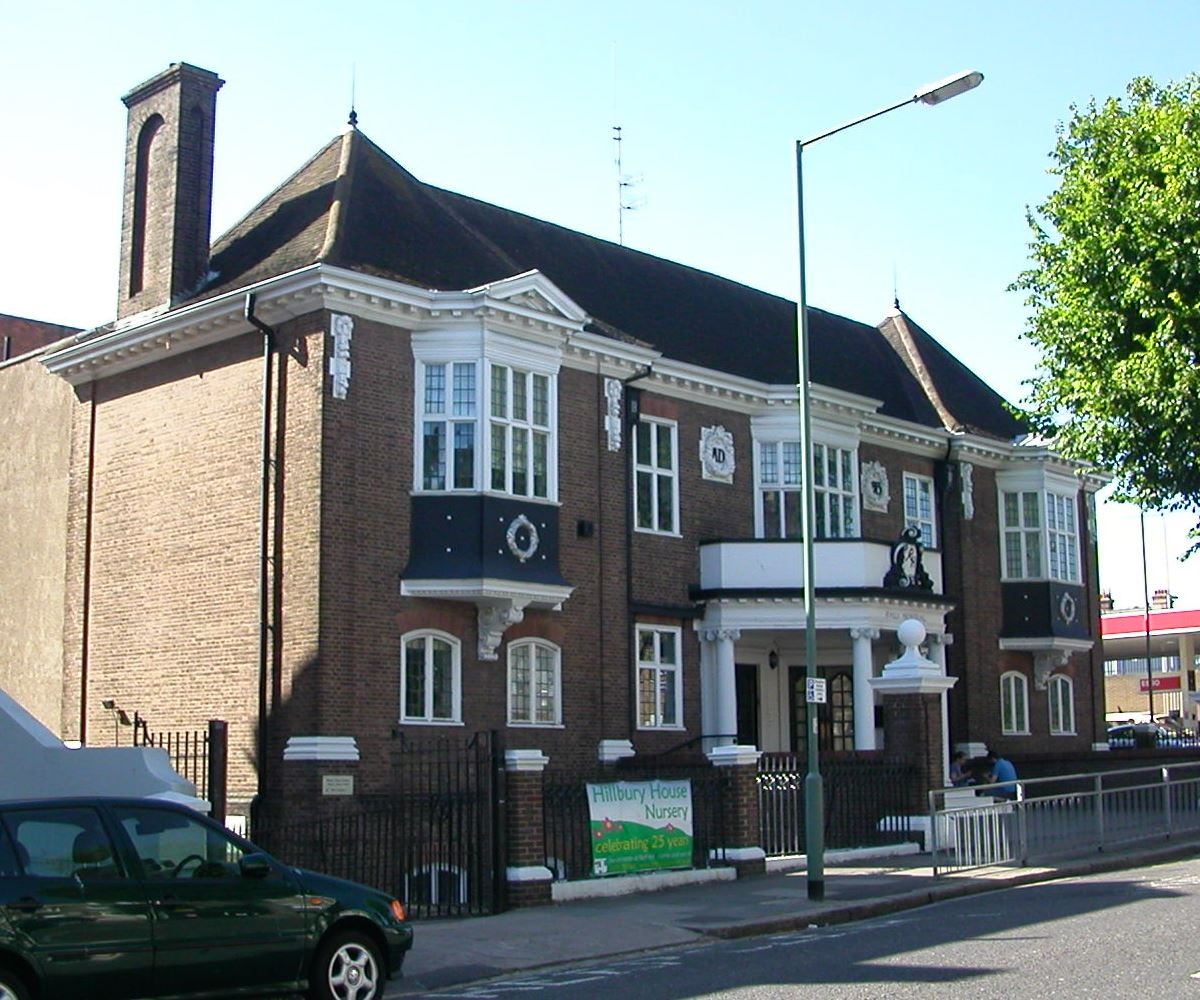
Ralli Hall in Hove commemorates Stephen Augustus Ralli.

Stephanos Ralli settled in Marseille, but recognising that London provided more opportunities for trade, he sent his son John there where, with his brothers, he set up Ralli Brothers, to trade with India. The company became the world's largest merchant shipping business. In 1879, one of the brothers, Eustratios Ralli, laid the foundation stone of St Sophia's Cathedral, London, which had another Ralli and a Rodocanachi on its finance committee.

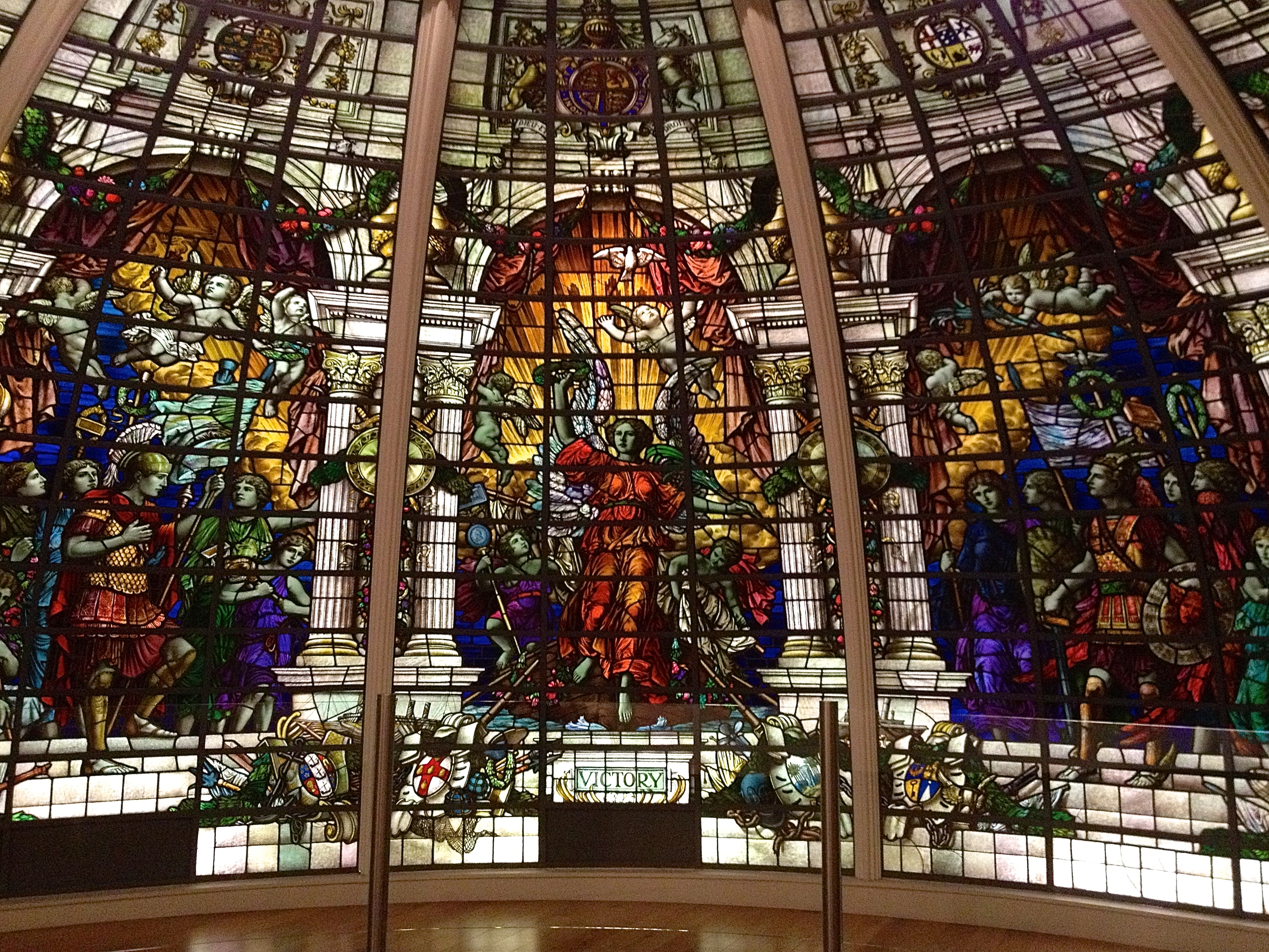
Stained glass window from London's Baltic Exchange (moved to the National Maritime Museum after the 1992 bombing)

Michel Emmanuel Rodocanachi (1821–1901) moved to Marseille with his parents, aged one. His son Michael moved to London. Stephen Ralli and Michael Rodocanachi were the leading founding shareholders of the Baltic Exchange in London.

The Vlasto and Pallis families settled in Liverpool. A descendant Alexandros Pallis controversially translated the New Testament into demotic Greek, leading to the Evangelika riots.

Leonidas Argenti was killed in the Chios massacre, but many of his family (el) were able to flee to London. A descendant, Philip Argenti (de), was educated in England and moved to Greece, where he worked as a lawyer, diplomat, and historian of Chios.

== See also ==
- Chian Committee, created to ensure the inclusion of the island in the newly established Greek state.
