= Ralli Brothers =

Greek businessmen in Britain

Ralli Brothers was perhaps the most successful expatriate Greek merchant business of the Victorian era. It was founded by the brothers Zannis a.k.a. John (1785–1859), Augustus (1792–1878), Pandia a.k.a. Zeus (1793–1865), Toumazis (1799–1858), and Eustratios (1800–1884).

Born to a wealthy merchant family of Chios, their father, Stephanos Ralli (1755–1827), had settled in Marseille, France, but recognised that the nexus of trading had changed in the aftermath of the Napoleonic Wars, and sent his eldest son, John, to London to explore business opportunities.

== Founding of the Ralli Brothers' partnership ==
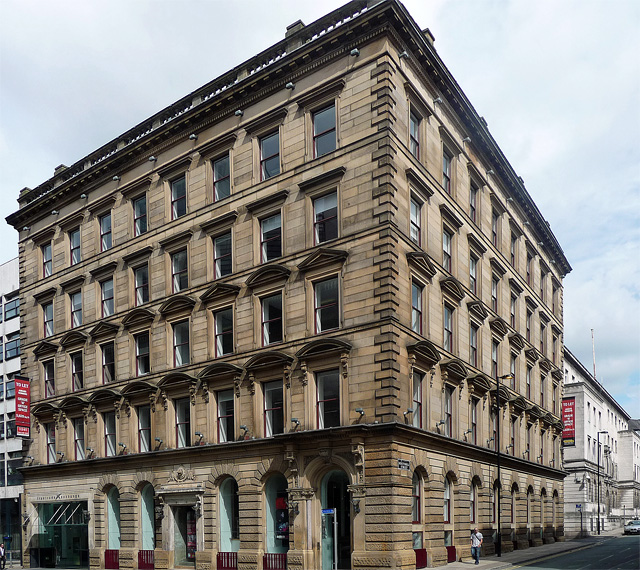
Harvester House, Peter Street, Manchester; warehouse, by Clegg & Knowles, c. 1868

John started trading in oriental silk and Russian grain in exchange for British textiles, and fetched his brothers over to help, incorporating as Ralli Brothers in London. His brother Eustratios ran the textile export operations from Manchester; Toumazis sourced raw materials and grain from Odessa and Constantinople; Pandia financed it from the Baltic Exchange in London; and Augustus oversaw the Mediterranean operations from Marseille.

Their move away from Greece followed the Chios massacre in 1822 and subsequent Greek diaspora, and saw their traditional home markets closed.

They were quick to seize new opportunities created by wars, political events, and the opening of new markets, such as corn, cotton, silk, opium and fruit, rapidly establishing major trading operations across the Mediterranean, Russia, reaching out as far as St Petersburg, Taganrog, Tabriz, Alexandria, Smyrna, and Syria.

Although they employed more than 40,000 people at one time, control rested in the hands of the extended family. When Pandia married in 1831, it was to Marietta Scaramanga (1810–60), another merchant from Chios, whose family had significant trading operations in Russia.

From 1851, the Ralli Brothers started operations in India, with offices in Calcutta and Bombay. The business specialised in jute, shellac, sesame, turmeric, ginger, rice, saltpetre, and borax, and employed 4,000 clerks and 15,000 warehousemen and dockers.

Their American operations were run from New York City and New Orleans, in association with their cousin Alexander Vlasto. They accurately gauged the grain opportunities that arose from the Crimean War, and were early traders in grain futures.

== Later generations, Ralli Brothers Ltd ==
The partnership was dissolved on the death of Pandias in 1865, but his nephew Stephen Augustus Ralli (1829–1902) passed the Russian business to the Scaramanga family, and re-constituted Ralli Brothers on the British, American and Indian operations. On his death it passed in turn to his nephew Sir Lucas Ralli Bt., (1846–1931), who continued the tradition of adroit investment.

They made fortunes by building on the Indian and American businesses, astutely shipping cotton and textiles after the American Civil War and, from 1882, dealing in opium. From new offices in Pondicherry and Madras they dealt in 'Khandesh' groundnuts. When World War I started, Rallis held the exclusive contract with the British War Department for jute sandbags. The Great Depression saw the company beset with cashflow problems. This forced the Indian operations to close, and another Greek trading family, Argenti, stepped in to act as their agents. From 1854, Rallis' sojourn in India was extremely successful until the great economic crash of 1929 led them to close down their Indian operations in 1931. From 1948 to 1963, Rallis India was reborn in a partitioned and independent India. The Company diversified, and its fertilizer and pesticides businesses began to take shape. From 1964 to 1978, the company passed through turbulent times, molting and evolving. From 1981 to 2000, its future was now firmly enmeshed in the future of Indian agriculture. By the early 1990s, Rallis became the fourth largest seed company in India. Tata Chemicals' fertilizer plant, manufacturing urea, was set up. Having identified agri-business as its core strength, Rallis India Ltd divested its pharmaceutical business, and decided to consolidate its position in pesticides, fertilizers and seeds.

Meanwhile, Ralli Brothers continued, based in London. In late 1960, Sir Isaac Wolfson, of Great Universal Stores, and Harry Recanati, of the Israel Discount Bank, approached the Board of Ralli Brothers. They offered to acquire the whole of its share capital, at a price that was between two and three times higher than the prevailing price, quoted on the London Stock Exchange. At this time, Jack Vlasto was the Company President, having taken over this role in 1950 from Sir Strati Ralli Bt., MC. The approach from Sir Isaac Wolfson was not welcomed by the company directors. However, as Ralli Brothers Ltd. was a merchant bank, the matter was referred to the Governor of the Bank of England. His advice was that the offer must be placed before the shareholders, so that they should not be denied the opportunity to sell their shares at a premium. In 1961, the shareholders voted to accept the offer. This led to Sir Isaac Wolfson taking over control of the commercial operations of the firm, in a deal worth £5.5m, a substantial sum at that time. The Israel Discount Bank added the international merchant banks of Ralli Brothers to its portfolio of private banks, although Harry Recanati left when the other Directors chose to list the banking group publicly on the Tel Aviv Stock Exchange, in 1970. In 1981 Ralli Brothers was sold to Cargill Inc. of Minneapolis, a billion dollar company. In 2002 this whole organization became known as Cargill Cotton. The Israel Discount Bank became insolvent in 1983 and was controversially nationalised by the Treasury of the Government of Israel. Recanati had retained ownership of the Swiss private bank of Ralli Brothers (Bankers) S.A. which he later sold to Security Pacific Bank of California, using the proceeds to found a number of public museums. These Ralli Museums are free, non-profit galleries, of contemporary Latin-American art.

In 1962, Sir Godfrey Ralli and his brother, Major Lucas Ralli, who had both been on the Board of Ralli Brothers, set up a new venture called G & L Ralli Investment & Trustee Co. Ltd. The company was established in August 1962, and shortly afterwards registered as a Trust Corporation. (Source: Evening Standard, 26 September 1962). The original capital of the company was £250,000, consisting of 250K shares of £1. G & L was primarily concerned with the management of trust funds, but soon branched out into general private client portfolio management. The Company later became a Licensed Dealer in Securities, and was registered as a member of FIMBRA. The mid-1970s saw Sir Godfrey taking early retirement to pursue country interests. Lucas, the younger brother, subsequently took over as Chairman of the Group, with Mike Kemp promoted to managing director, soon thereafter. In 1983, the Ralli Investment Company Ltd., a wholly owned subsidiary, acquired a Deposit-Taking Licence from the Bank of England. John Ralli, son of Lucas, was a Director of G & L Ralli from 1986 to 1990. In 1997, G & L Ralli merged with Ely Fund Managers. Ely Fund Managers, the UK private banking business of the Franco-Belgium group, Dexia, in turn, were subsequently absorbed into Rathbones in 2006, for a price of £14.5m.

== Cultural influence ==
The Rallis used their establishment in London and elsewhere to help the influx of Greek merchants that emigrated to set up in business and settle into their new countries. Although they maintained their Greek culture and religion, they mostly became assimilated and naturalised subjects in their adopted lands. Pandia had a reputation for fair dealing and avoided questionable deals and finances, and forced his standards on the other Greek émigrés with whom they did business, earning him the nickname of 'Zeus'.

Through their contacts, who included Byron, they rose to prominence in British business and aristocratic circles, with Pandia becoming a leading representative of the Greek Community in London and British Consul for the newly independent country of Greece, and organised the Greek entry in The Great Exhibition of 1851.

== Legacy ==
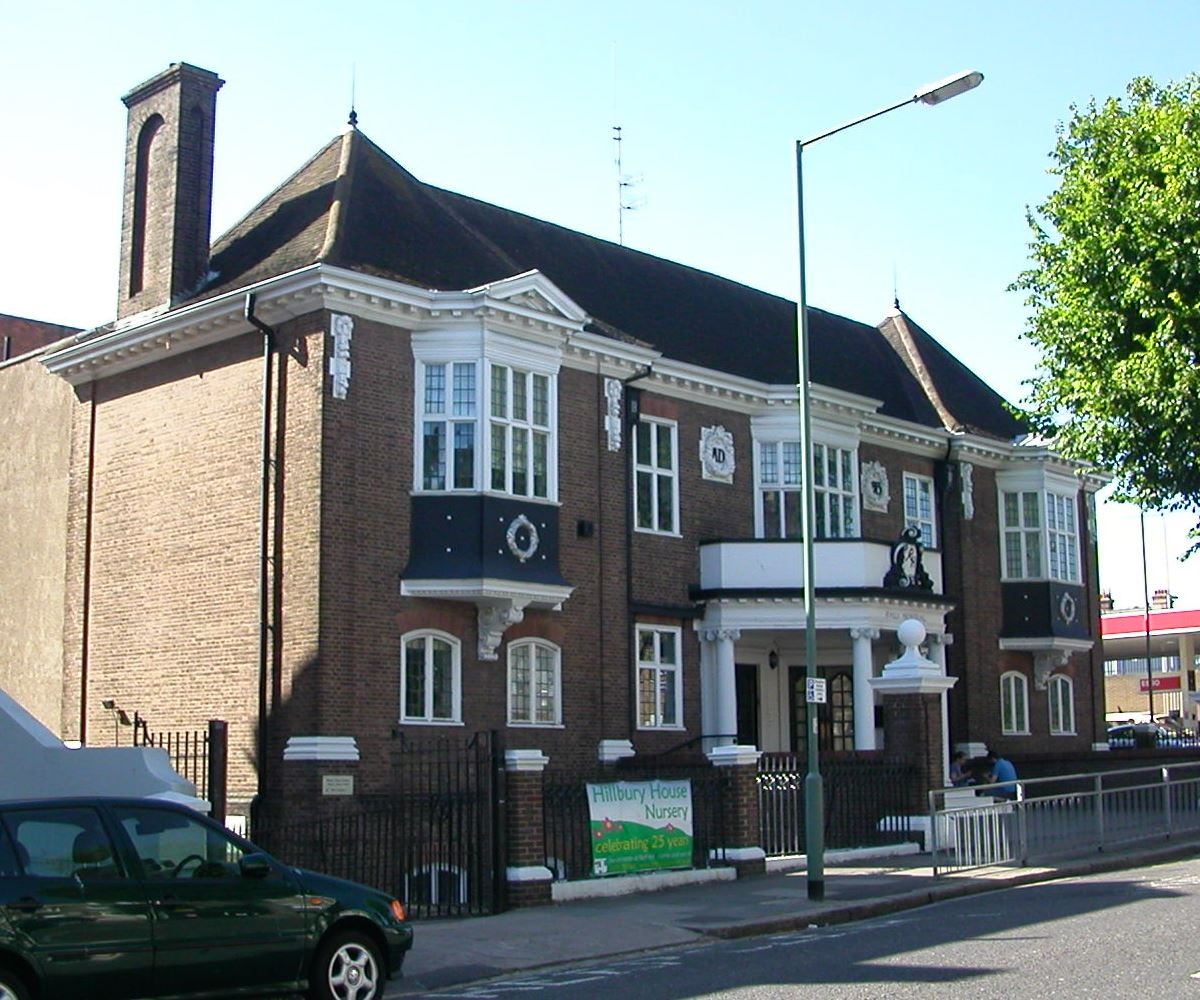
Ralli Hall in Hove commemorates Stephen Augustus Ralli.

Perhaps influenced by their families' own experience, the Ralli brothers and their descendants were frequent donors to medical charities operating in Eastern Europe and the Balkan wars. The family initiated the construction of Saint Sophia Cathedral, (co-funded by prominent members of the Greek community in London) and Pandia was instrumental in setting up the Greek Orthodox cemetery within West Norwood Cemetery in 1842. Antonius commissioned the Doric chapel to St Stephen there from John Oldrid Scott, now listed Grade II*. Some of the family also commissioned architects to create their own significant mausoleums there, including:

- Eustratios Ralli, a Doric temple by Edward Middleton Barry (Grade II)
- Antonios Ralli, a Roman-style temple mausoleum (Grade II)
- John Peter Ralli, a two-storey polychromatic mausoleum by George Edmund Street in his streaky bacon style (Grade II*)

In 1881, Greek-French painter Théodore Ralli married Eustratios Stephanos Ralli's (1800–1884) granddaughter, Julia Mavrokordatos. Ralli Hall was built in 1913 in Hove, East Sussex, as the church hall of All Saints Church. It was named in honour of Stephen Augustus Ralli, whose death in 1902 had also been commemorated by the installation of stained-glass windows in the church in 1904. The hall was sold in 1975 to the Brighton and Hove Jewish Community, who use it for their own activities and make it available for hire to other groups. The Edwardian Baroque-style building was listed at Grade II in 1992.

== See also ==
- Ralli baronets
- Theodore Stephanides, (his mother was a Ralli)
- Chian diaspora
