= Sack of Athens =

Sack of Athens can refer to:

- the Sack of Athens (480 BC) by the Persians
- the Sack of Athens (86 BC) by Sulla
- the Sack of Athens (267 AD) by the Heruli

== See also ==
- Siege of Athens (disambiguation)
