= Chios expedition =

1827 military campaign

Date	1827
Location	Chios, Greece

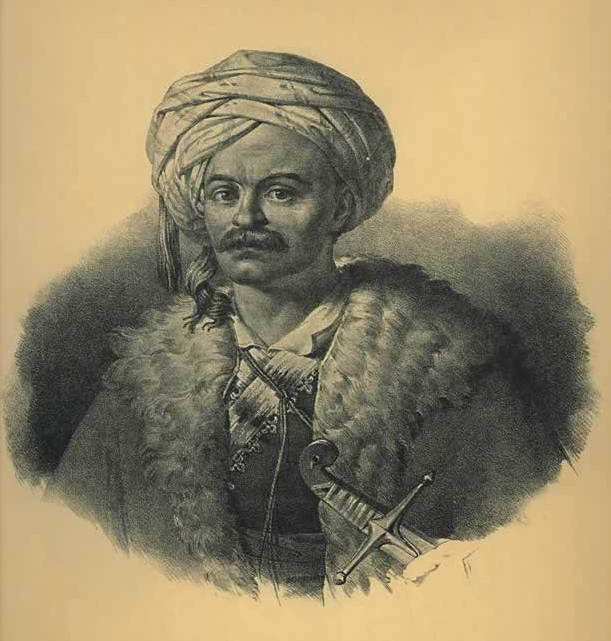
Charles Fabvier

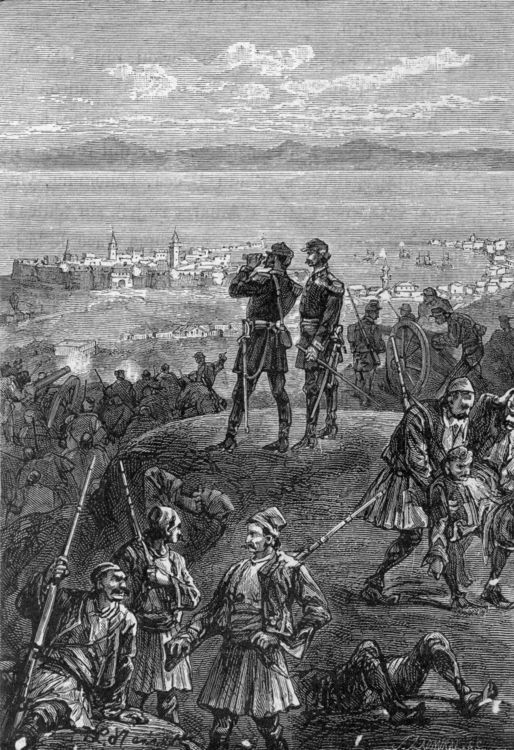
The siege of Chios, illustration from The Archipelago on Fire

The Chios expedition (Greek: Εκστρατεία της Χίου) was an unsuccessful attempt of the regular Greek army and irregular military units for the recapture of Chios island during the final stages of the Greek War of Independence. Chios had participated in the Greek uprising against the Ottoman Empire, but had been captured and its population massacred by the Ottoman fleet in 1822.

== Historical background ==
In the last months of 1827, as independence loomed, the Greek rebels launched simultaneous military operations from Peloponnese to Chios, Crete, eastern and western Greece. This happened because they were very concerned that large areas would remain outside the prospective Greek state, even areas that had revolted and had suffered many hardships during the previous stages of the War of Independence.

In 1827, Chian merchants who lived in Syros sent letters to the Greek government begging them to undertake an expedition to regain Chios. The newly formed Chian Committee sent a letter to their fellow Chian, Adamantios Korais, asking him to find basic resources (like water and food) for the campaign. The Vice-gubernatorial Committee that administered Greece until the arrival of Governor Ioannis Kapodistrias ordered Sir Richard Church to assign the task of recovering Chios to Charles Nicolas Fabvier in August 1827. At first, Fabvier didn't act, but soon began organizing an expeditionary force of 600-700 men, mostly from the regular army, as well as a small artillery force (4 field guns, 6-7 siege guns, 3 mortars). The force was complemented by 200 cavalry (although less than a quarter actually had horses), which did not arrive until November, and over a thousand irregulars from Central Greece and Chian refugees.

== Initial campaign ==
The expedition assembled at the island of Psara, near Chios, which likewise had been captured and ravaged by the Ottomans in 1824. The expeditionary force landed on Chios on 17 October, facing the Ottoman garrison of 2,000 men under Yusuf Pasha. The next day, the Greek fleet under Thomas Cochrane offloaded further 5 mortars and 1,000 shells. The Greek expedition had already caused the reaction of the Great Powers, whose admirals in the Aegean on 12 October had issued a proclamation opposing any renewed uprising on Chios. Undeterred, Fabvier defeated the first Ottoman forces that opposed him, forcing them to shut themselves in the medieval Castle of Chios, which he laid siege to. The siege was incomplete, however, as Fabvier lacked a fleet to blockade the fortress from the sea as well.

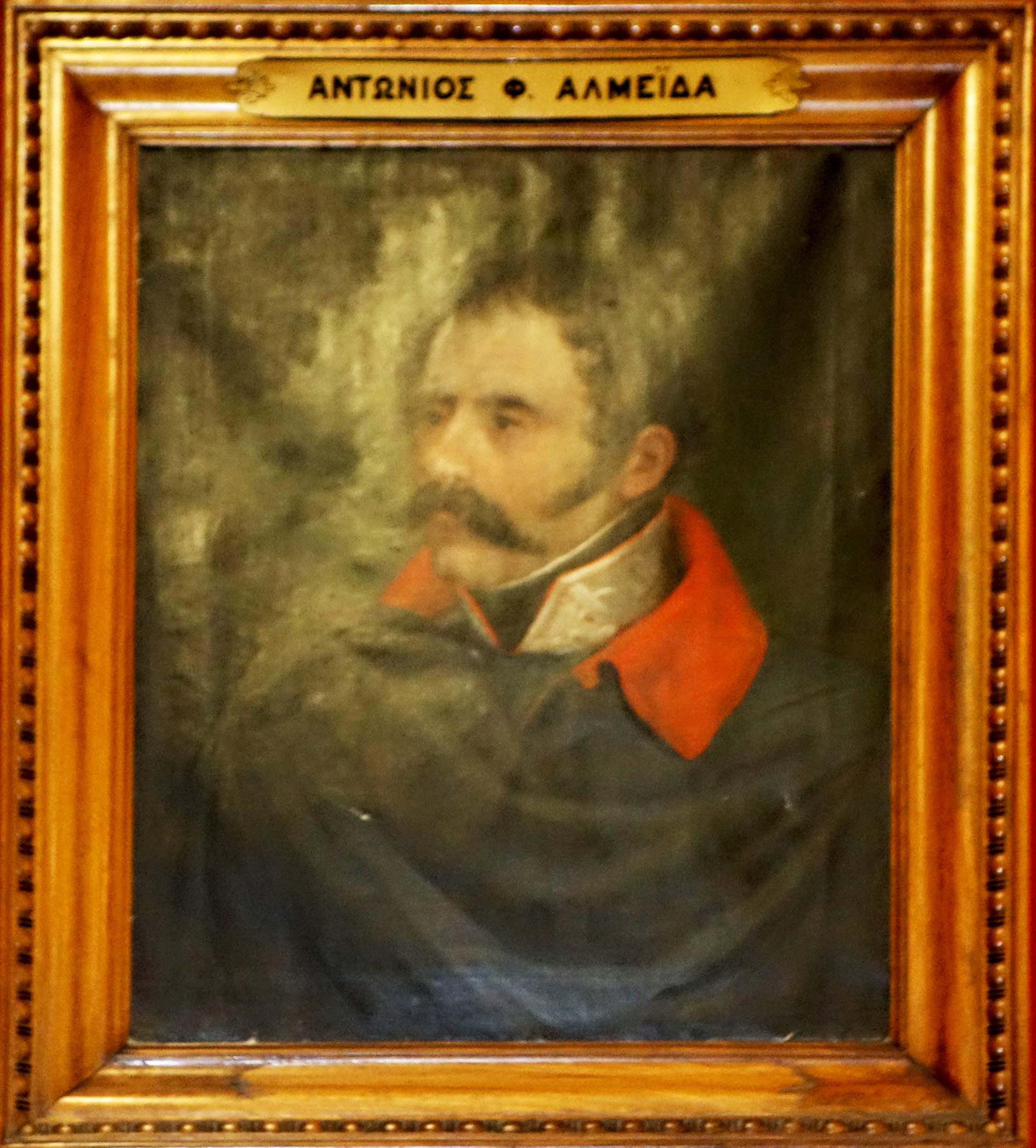
The Portuguese Antonio Figueira d' Almeida was commander of the Greek cavalry at Chios

Α serious problem that Fabvier was facing was the order from the French admiral Henri de Rigny to quit and leave. Fabvier replied that he only took orders from the Greek government. On 5 November 1827 he was reinforced by the cavalry under the philhellene Portuguese colonel Antonio Figueira d'Almeida. A few days later the famed mine-digger Konstantinos Lagoumitzis came to the island in order to help undermine the walls of the castle.

At the same time, Fabvier launched raids on the Anatolian shores, and prepared a large-scale attack on the port of Çeşme, in conjunction with a fireship attack under Konstantinos Kanaris against the ships in port there. In the event, strong winds prevented the execution of this operation. A similar raid against the environs of Smyrna was thwarted after the brig Sotir sunk in a storm on 6 January 1828.

== Ottoman garrison ==
On 12 January, the Ottomans launched a strong sortie against the poorly guarded bastion of the Greek siege lines, and soon made rapid progress until stopped by the strong resistance of irregulars under the kapetanios Gekas, who bought precious time for the intervention of the 2nd Regular Battalion, which drove the Turks back. Fabvier himself, seeing Turkish banners on his trenches, took the 3rd Battalion and recaptured the original bastion the Turks had captured. The Turks lost 240 (according to other sources as many as 524) men, but the victory was not decisive as the blockade remained loose. The new governor, Kapodistrias, sent money and reinforcements to the island and ordered the fleet to assist, but the situation was critical: the Chian Committee had ceased providing pay and supplies to the troops, while the exactions of the irregular fighters exacerbated relations with the locals.

== Evacuation ==
Finally, on 27 February 1828, an Ottoman squadron drove away the Greek ships aiding the siege. On the next day, they escorted 3,000 troops from Çeşme across the sea to Chios. The first attempts to land elsewhere on the island were thwarted by the regular Greek troops, forcing the Ottomans to land in the fortress. Their arrival led to the collapse of morale of the Chian population, many of whom fled the island. Fabvier decided to lift the siege and withdraw, and in early March, he and his men were evacuated from the island.

== Sources ==
- Παναγής Δ. Ζούβας (1971). Η εκστρατεία της Χίου υπό τον Φαβιέρον κατά την Ελληνικήν Επανάστασιν. Athens.
- Η Ελληνική Επανάσταση και η ίδρυση του Ελληνικού Κράτους (1821-1832) - (τόμος ΙΒ). Athens: Εκδοτική Αθηνών. 1975. ISBN 960-213-095-4.
- Σπυρίδωνας Τρικούπης (1994). Από τη Γ΄ Εθνοσυνέλευση στην Επίδαυρο ως την ανακύρηξη της Ανεξαρτησίας - (τόμος Τέταρτος). Athens: Νέα σύνορα - Α. Α. Λιβάνη. ISBN 960-236-370-3.
