= Ralli Hall =

Historic site in Brighton and Hove, United Kingdom

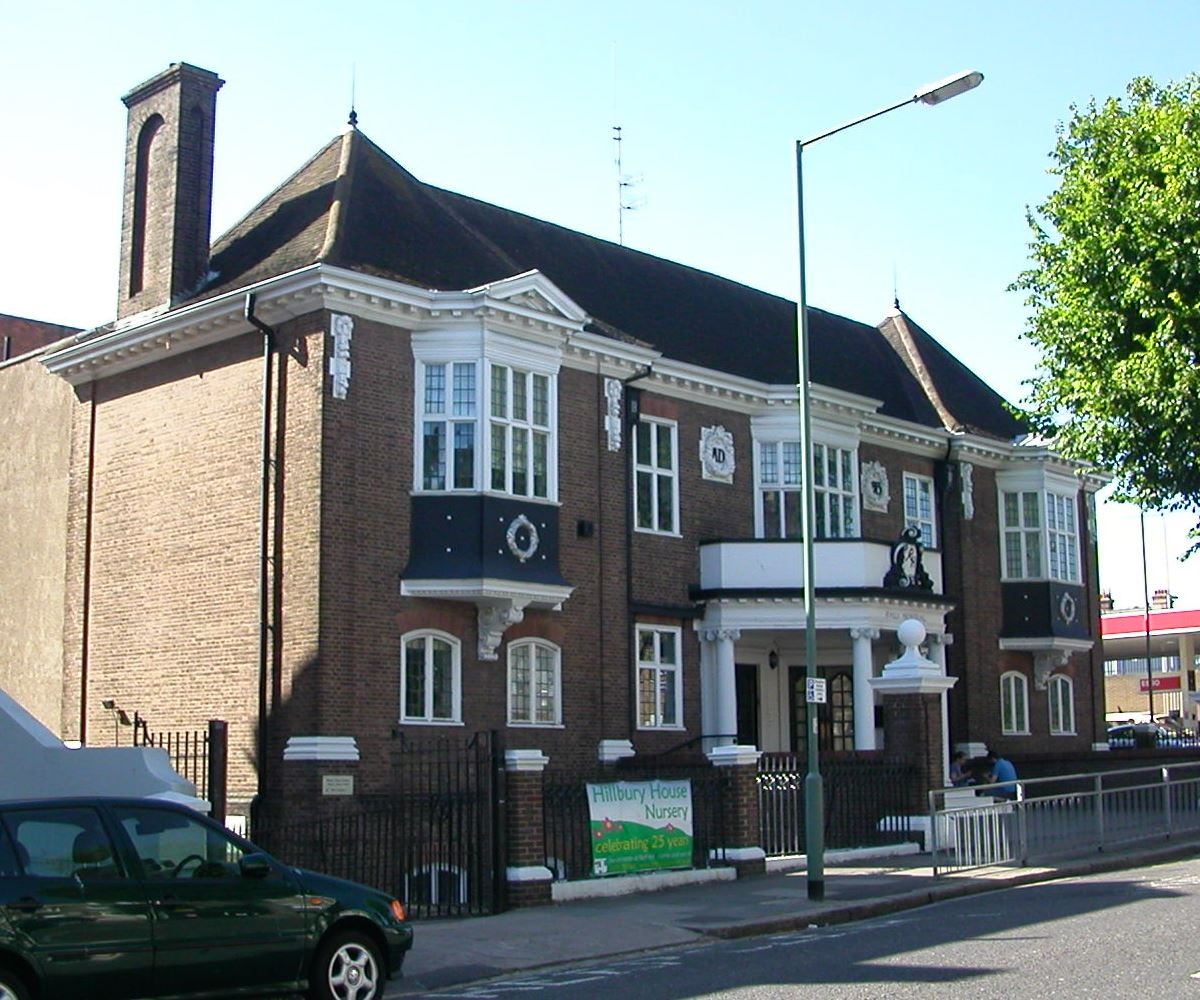
- The main entrance to Ralli Hall from the east

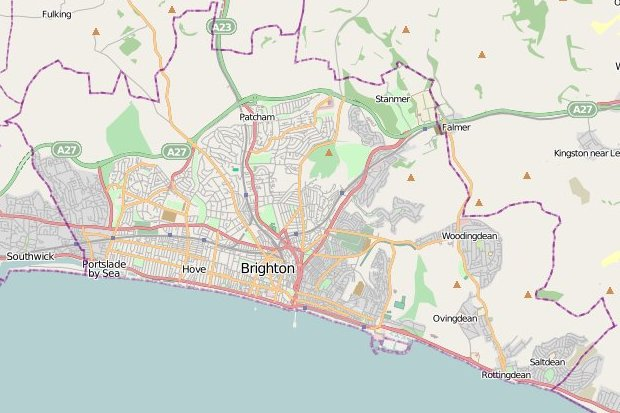
- Location within Brighton and Hove
- 50.8346°N 0.1699°W
- Location: 81 Denmark Villas, Hove, Brighton and Hove BN3 3TH, United Kingdom

History
- Built: 1913
- Built for: All Saints Church, Hove (memorial to Stephen Ralli)

Site notes
- Architect(s): Read and Macdonald
- Architectural style: Edwardian Baroque/Wrenaissance
- Restored: 1976
- Restored by: Brighton & Hove Jewish Community
- Governing body: Brighton & Hove Jewish Community (owner)
- Website: www.rallihall.com

Listed Building – Grade II
- Official name: Ralli Memorial Hall, walls and railings
- Designated: 2 November 1992
- Reference no.: 1298671

Ralli Hall (also known as Ralli Memorial Hall) is a community centre, events venue, theatre stage, business hub and main hall in Hove, part of the English coastal city of Brighton and Hove. Built in 1913 as a memorial to Stephen Ralli, a member of a wealthy Greek family who had donated money to many causes throughout Brighton and Hove, it was used for about 60 years as a church hall linked to Hove's parish church. The Brighton & Hove Jewish community subsequently bought it, and in 1976 it came back into use as a community and social centre for Jewish and other groups. The Wrenaissance-style brick structure occupies a prominent corner site in a conservation area and provides a visual contrast to the older villas around it. English Heritage has listed the building at Grade II for its architectural and historical importance.

== History ==
The Ralli family, the first members of which moved to England in the 1820s from Chios in Greece, established a successful trading empire in London in the 19th century. Their business focused on grain and shipping, and by 1873 the five pioneering brothers and six other relatives had a listing on the Baltic Exchange. Stephen Augustus Ralli, son of Augustus Ralli, made his fortune in grain and owned houses in London and the seaside resort of Hove: he lived at St Catherine's Lodge on Kingsway from 1894 until his death in 1902.

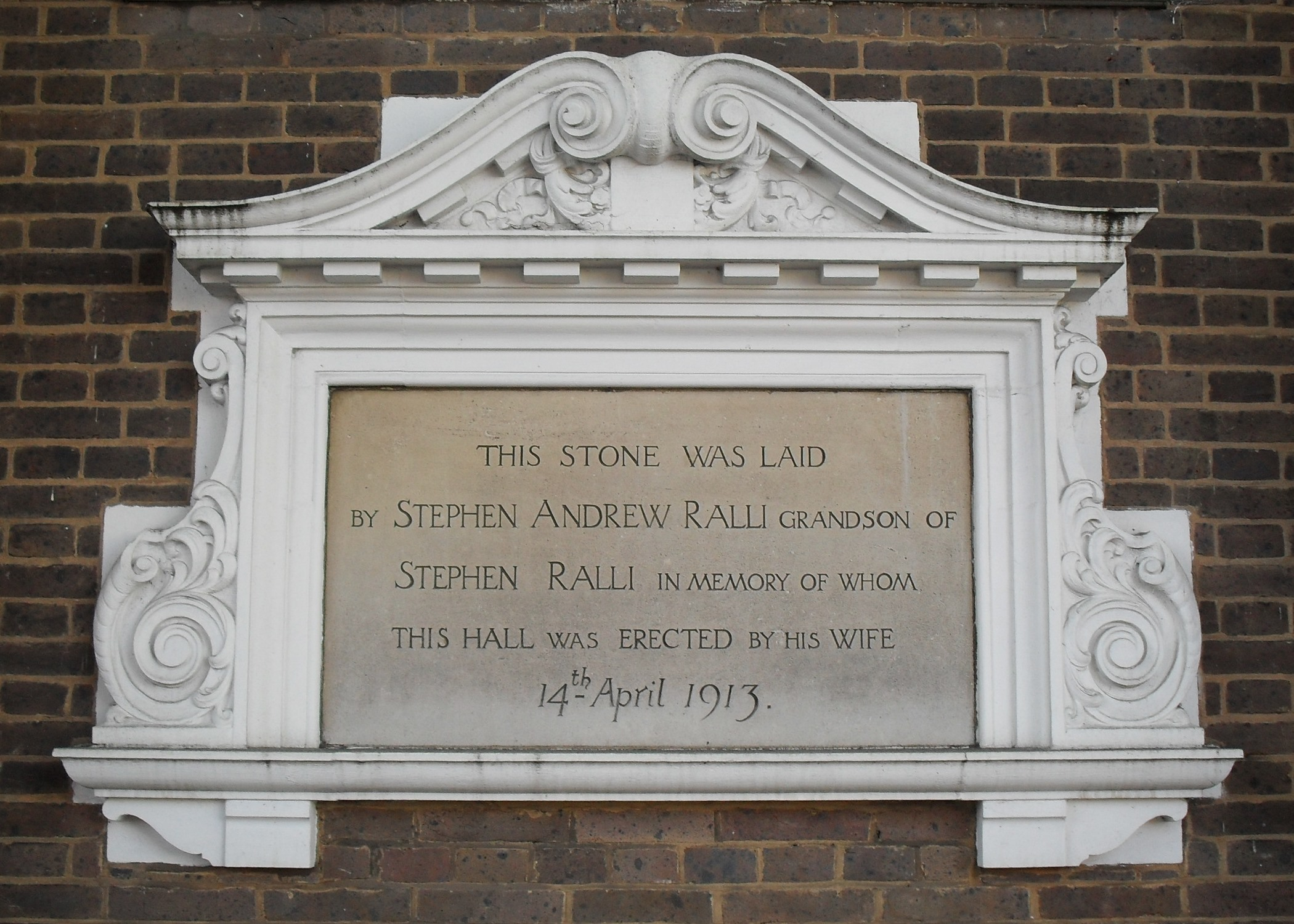
The foundation plaque was laid on 14 April 1913.

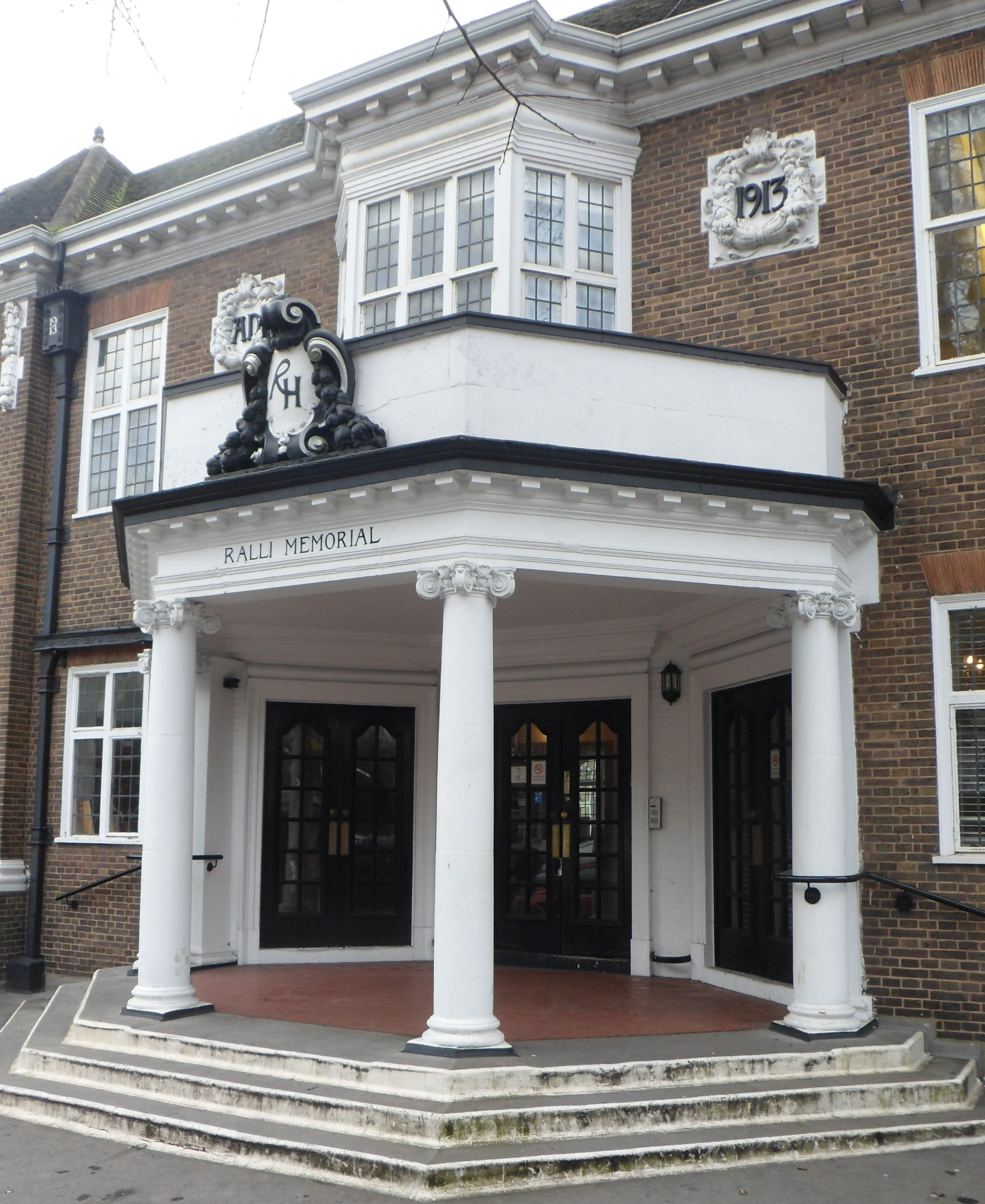
The entrance is in a hexagonal porch.

Both Stephen and other members of the family attended All Saints Church (the parish church of Hove, built in 1889–1901 by John Loughborough Pearson and his son) and were major benefactors of charitable causes in the area. For example, Stephen Ralli made a donation of £300 (£33,300 in 2025) to a fund set up to help victims of a typhoid epidemic in nearby Worthing in 1893. In 1904, his widow Marietta commissioned three stained glass windows in the church to commemorate him, and gave £26,434 (£2,778,900 in 2025) from her inheritance to the Royal Sussex County Hospital "to endow and fit up a department of clinical research and bacteriology". The Stephen Ralli Building at the hospital was demolished in 2000 but was replaced by a new facility with the same name.

"The most visible reminder of the family" in Hove, though, was founded in 1913. The area around Hove railway station was mostly built up with houses by the end of the 19th century, but a large plot at the junction of Denmark Villas and Station Approach remained vacant. All Saints lacked a church hall, so Ralli's grandson (also named Stephen) and widow decided to pay for the construction of a hall as a memorial to him. London-based architects Read and Macdonald, who designed many buildings on that city's Cadogan and Grosvenor Estates, were commissioned to design it, and the firm of Chapman, Lowry and Puttoch constructed the building. Stephen Ralli laid the foundation stone (in the form of a plaque) on 14 April 1913, and a board of trustees was set up to administer the building. The indenture was issued on 2 May 1913 in the names of Marietta Ralli, Rev. L.H. Burrows (the vicar of Hove), a local Justice of the Peace and two others.

Almost immediately, the gymnasium in the basement section of the building was put to use as a drill hall to train soldiers fighting in World War I. They were part of the 106th Brigade RFA, whose operational base was the nearby Hove Recreation Ground. Among the other facilities at that time were a kitchen, dressing rooms and a large auditorium-style room with a stage, gallery and seating capacity of 350, which was licensed as a cinema and theatre in October 1913. Another theatrical licence was granted in 1926, by which time the hall was also used by eight Girl Guide patrols and various community groups.

All Saints Church gradually used the building less, and a new church hall was built closer to the church in the 1970s. By that time, many community groups were using the wide variety of rooms and facilities; but consideration was given to selling the hall. From 30 September 1973, Ralli Hall was closed except for the rooms in the basement, and a speculative planning application was submitted seeking demolition of the hall and its replacement with 24 flats—apparently to gauge the likely value of the land. Permission was granted, but the trustees refused to go ahead with the proposal. The East Sussex Social Services Department expressed an interest in buying the building in 1975. Before any action could be taken, though, the hall was put up for sale to the highest bidder. Only two groups expressed an interest — Hove Borough Council and the Brighton & Hove Jewish Youth Council, an organisation supporting Hove's large Jewish community (about 10,000 Jewish people live in the Brighton and Hove area). This group was successful with its bid of £65,000; over £50,000 had already been raised by the community by the time the purchase was agreed. When the building reopened after substantial renovations (which took the overall cost of the purchase above £100,000), several rooms were named after major donors. The work was done quickly: Ralli Hall reopened on 30 June 1976 in a ceremony led by Frankie Vaughan.

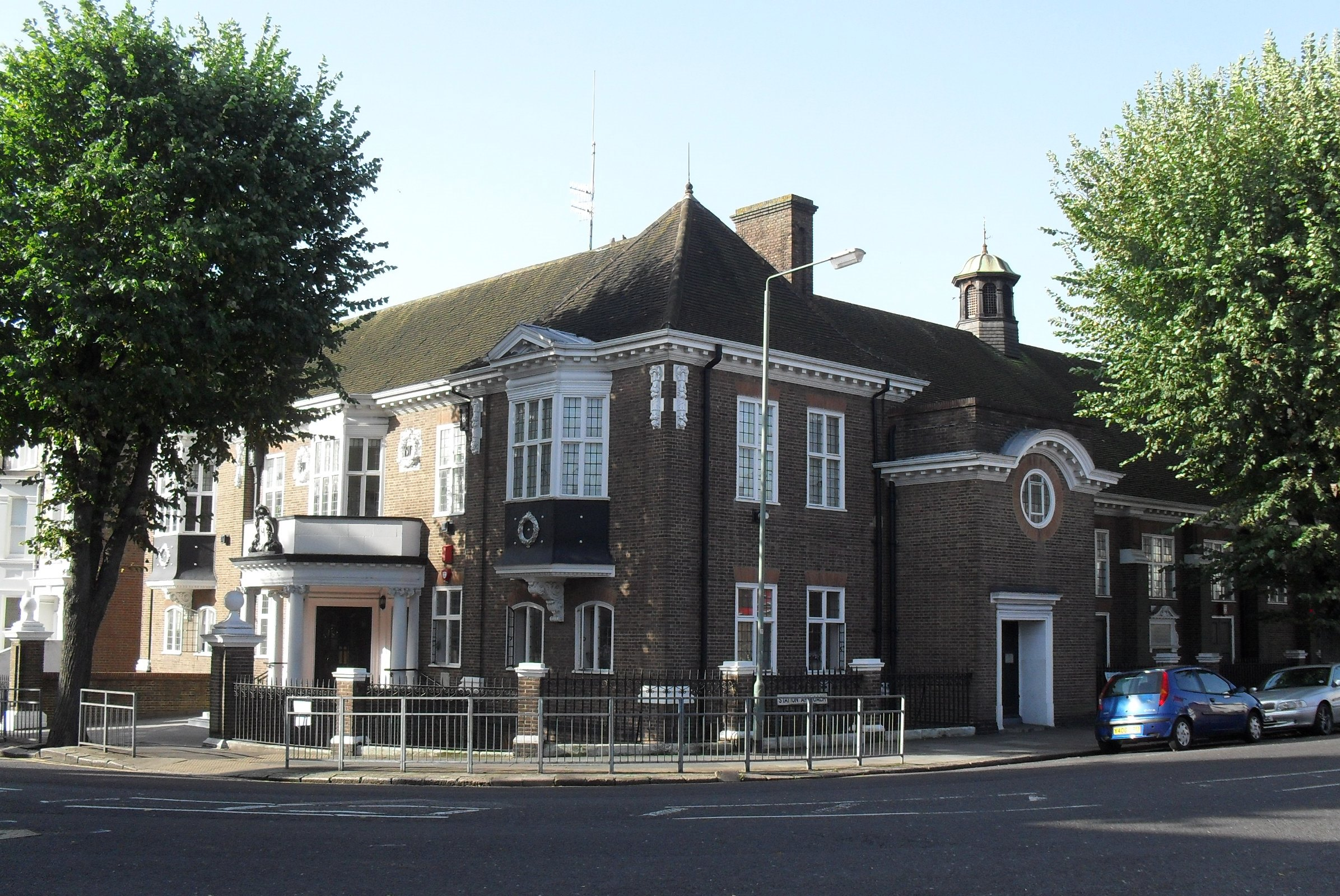
The l-shaped building is on a corner.

Since its change of ownership, the building has become an integral part of community life in Hove and hosts a diverse range of activities in its ten rooms. The upper floor was licensed as a Jewish place of worship in July 1977 in accordance with the Places of Worship Registration Act 1855; its number on the register is 74657. This is in addition to Hove's four purpose-built synagogues: the Hove Hebrew Congregation Synagogue (opened in 1930), the Brighton and Hove Progressive Synagogue (1938), the Brighton and Hove Hebrew Congregation Synagogue (1961) and the Brighton and Hove Reform Synagogue (1967). Jewish Scout troops also met in the building. Italia Conti Clapham & Brighton, a stage school which is associated with the Italia Conti Academy of Theatre Arts, is based at Ralli Hall. The building is a licensed wedding venue; yoga, zumba and ceroc dance classes are held; mother-and-baby, art, theatre and bridge clubs meet there; and there is a snooker room. The kitchen facilities are kosher-certified.

Ralli Hall was listed at Grade II by English Heritage on 2 November 1992. This defines it as a "nationally important" building of "special interest". In February 2001, it was one of 1,124 Grade II-listed buildings and structures, and 1,218 listed buildings of all grades, in the city of Brighton and Hove. The building is also in the Hove Station Conservation Area, one of 34 conservation areas in Brighton and Hove. It serves as "an important focal point" in an area of predominantly late Victorian residential building in the vicinity of Hove railway station.

== Architecture ==
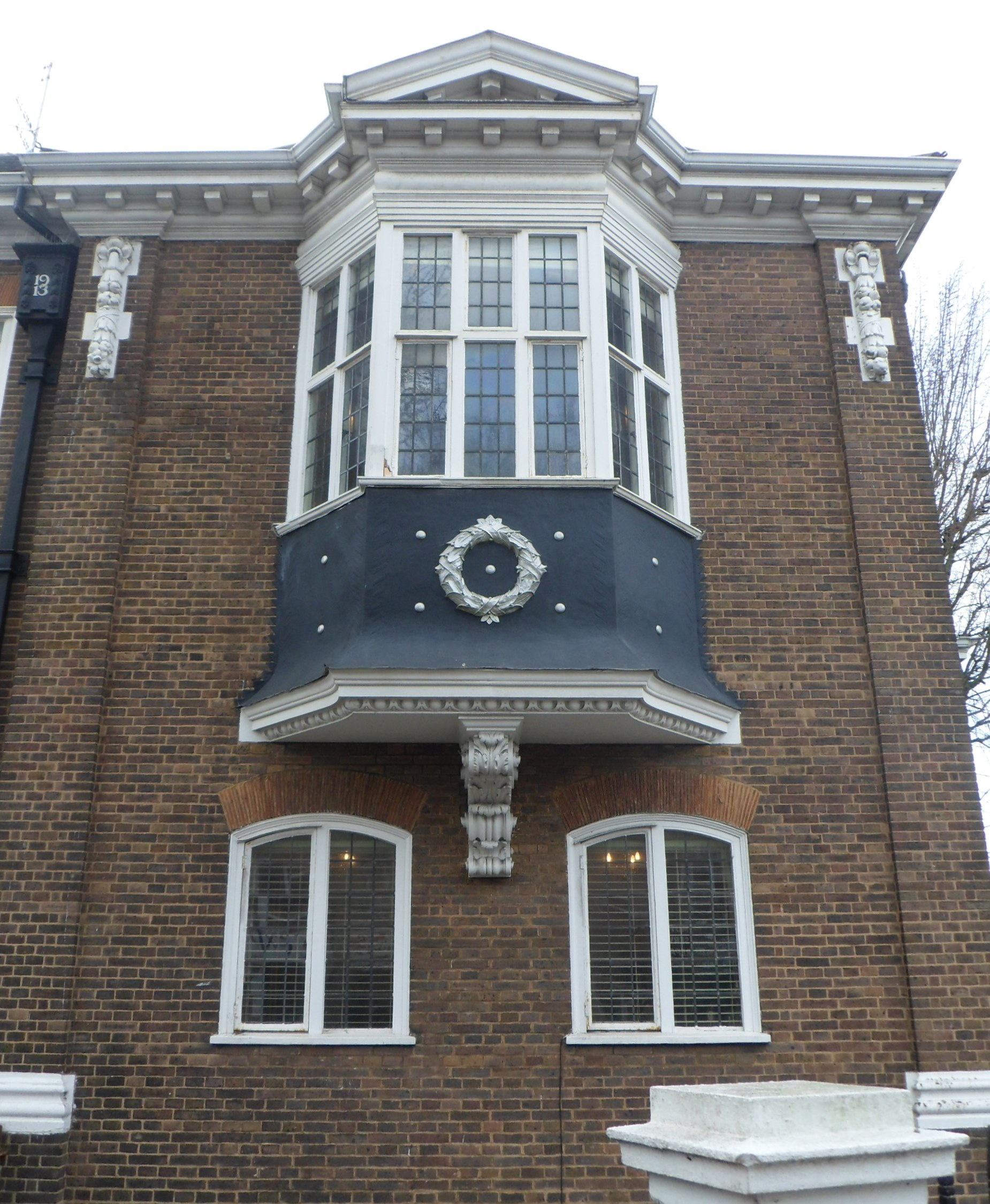
The upper floor has oriel windows.

Architects Read and Macdonald of London designed Ralli Hall in a "restrained Renaissance style" which has also been described as "Wrenaissance" (i.e. Edwardian Baroque which relies more heavily on English than French Baroque motifs). It has been described as an "important" local landmark and a "fine composition".

The building is l-shaped and occupies a corner site facing Station Approach and Denmark Villas. The main entrance is to the latter; the hall then stretches back along Station Approach. This elevation (facing north) has 11 bays in a 2–1–6–2 layout, while the east-facing entrance wing is a symmetrical composition with a 1–3–1 bay layout. The walls are of dark red brick in the English bond pattern; the hipped roof has clay tiles and prominent eaves, separated from the walls by a clearly articulated dentil cornice of painted timber; and the windows have stone mullions and transoms with leaded light glass. Small brick walls and iron railings surround the building and are included in English Heritage's listing. The building provides a contrast in age and architectural style to the well-spaced, well-detailed 1860s houses of Denmark Villas, with their pale brickwork and stucco.

The east (Denmark Villas) elevation is dominated by a central hexagonal entrance porch topped by a balcony. An oriel window opens out on to this; to the left and right are stone garland motifs showing AD and 1913 respectively, and these are flanked by flat casement windows. Two more oriel windows are in the outermost bays. The bays are defined by brick pilasters, and the outermost oriel windows have open pediments above and richly decorated brackets below. The Ionic-columned stepped porch spans the centre three bays and leads to a recessed entrance with three sets of doors. Supported by the columns is a parapet with a dentil cornice and a centrally placed cartouche with the initials rh.

The north (Station Approach) elevation has the foundation plaque, which reads "this stone was laid / by STEPHEN ANDREW RALLI grandson of / STEPHEN RALLI in memory of whom / this hall was erected by his wife / 14th April 1913". In the third bay from the left (east) is a secondary entrance with a semicircular gable across which the dentil cornice continues. Below this gable is a large oculus. The other windows have stone mullions and transoms, and the walls are supported by external buttresses.

== See also ==
- Grade II listed buildings in Brighton and Hove: P–R
- Media related to Ralli Hall at Wikimedia Commons
