= Chian Committee =

Committee

The Chian Committee (Greek: Επιτροπή των Χίων) was a committee of Chians, consisting of Ambrosios Skaramangas, Loukas Rallis and Georgios Psychas, which was created to ensure the inclusion of Chios in the newly established Greek state. Also undertook the financial and material support of the Chios expedition (1827–1828).

After the destruction of Chios in 1822 by the Ottoman army several of the inhabitants settled in other parts of Greece and Europe. Many of them settled in Syros and engaged in trade. Longing for the liberation of their homeland and worried that Chios would be left outside the borders of the formation of a new Greek state, they organized thus committee.

== The work of the committee before the expedition ==
The Chian residents of Syros collected enough money from their fellow citizens, they offered themselves money for the mobilization and supply of naval and military force. To this end they appointed three of their countrymen, Ambrosios Skaramangas, Loukas Rallis and Georgios Psychas, to represent, constituting the Committee of Chios. Representing approximately five thousand compatriots and worked to prepare the liberation of Chios.

== The work of the committee during the expedition ==
Representatives of the committee came into contact with the Vice-Gubernatorial Commission and tried to secure its approval to make campaign for the liberation of the island. The committee approved the Vice-Gubernatorial Commission's campaign, the cost of which will be paid by the Chians. General Charles Nicolas Fabvier and discussed with him the possible campaign. On August 19, 1827, was given command of the Commander of terrestrial forces, Sir Richard Church, issuing appropriate orders to Colonel Fabvier to free the island. The war activities on the island began in October 1827. The Fabvier asked the committee to arrange to exclude the Turks, who were in the castle of the island, the sea not to refuel, but they were busy organizing health and other authorities and report expenses. In January 1828 when he came Ioannis Kapodistrias in Greece, Fabvier sent letter requesting aid supplies and money. Kapodistrias, although he knew that the campaign in Chios was unfortunate, he sent all possible aid because they did not want to risk the lives of the inhabitants. But the Committee of Chios had stopped regularly pays his soldiers and did their ammunition as agreed. Regular and irregular troops grumbling. On February 28, 1928, was landing some 3000 Turkish soldiers on the island and many of the residents together with representatives of the committee of Chios on the island fled. That evening Fabvier implemented plan for withdrawal from the island. The committee announced that it had come Andreas Vokos Miaoulis with the frigate "Hellas" and other ships which had clear Turkish and asked him to return. The Fabvier agreed. But the chieftains of random army asked the committee two salaries and provide them systematically ammunition and food. The committee agreed only on condition that first would return and would close the Turks in the fortress of the island.

== The end of the committee's work of Chios ==
After this incident the army moved near Red and from there transferred to nearby Greek deserted island where Greek and Allied ships the received safely. Without the expected outcome in March 1828, finished the campaign on the island and the work of the Commission of Chios.

== Sources ==
- Παναγής Δ. Ζούβας (1971). Η εκστρατεία της Χίου υπό τον Φαβιέρον κατά την Ελληνικήν Επανάστασιν. Athens.
- Η Ελληνική Επανάσταση και η ίδρυση του Ελληνικού Κράτους (1821-1832) - (τόμος ΙΒ). Athens: Εκδοτική Αθηνών. 1975. ISBN 960-213-095-4.
- Σπυρίδωνας Τρικούπης (1994). Από τη Γ΄ Εθνοσυνέλευση στην Επίδαυρο ως την ανακύρηξη της Ανεξαρτησίας - (τόμος Τέταρτος). Athens: Νέα σύνορα - Α. Α. Λιβάνη. ISBN 960-236-370-3.
