= Charles Nicolas Fabvier =

French diplomat and general (1782–1855)

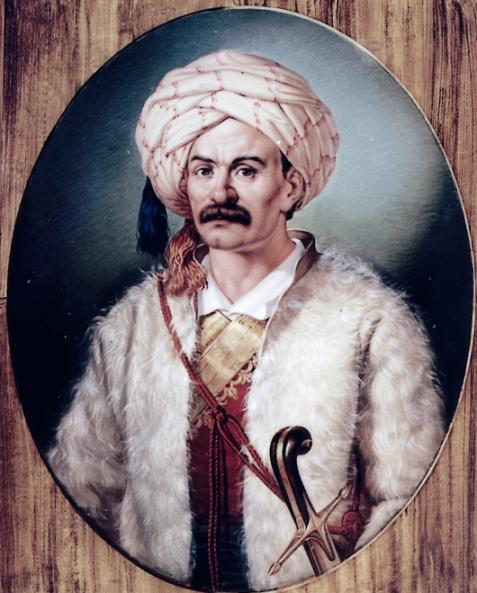
- Born: 10 December 1782; Pont-à-Mousson, Kingdom of France
- Died: 15 September 1855 (aged 72); Paris, Second French Empire
- Military career
- Allegiance: First French Empire; Duchy of Warsaw (Greece) First Hellenic Republic; Bourbon Restoration
- Branch: French Army; Hellenic Army
- Service years: 1804-1831
- Rank: Captain (Imperial Guard); Colonel of the General Staff; Lieutenant General
- Conflicts: Napoleonic Wars; War of the Third Coalition; Battle of Dürenstein; French invasion of Russia; Battle of Borodino; War of the Sixth Coalition; War of the Seventh Coalition; Greek War of Independence; Siege of the Acropolis; Morea Expedition

Charles Nicolas Fabvier (Greek: Κάρολος Φαβιέρος, romanized: Karolos Favieros) (10 December 1782 – 15 September 1855) was an ambassador, general and French member of parliament who played a distinguished role in the Greek War of Independence.

== Career under Napoleon ==
He was born at Pont-à-Mousson in Meurthe and was a student at the École Polytechnique before joining the 1st Artillery Regiment in Napoleon’s army in Germany in 1804. He participated in the 1805 Ulm Campaign, and was wounded in the battle of Dürenstein. In 1807, he was part of the French military mission to the Ottoman Sultan Selim III, tasked with shoring up the defences of Constantinople. Fabvier then managed to join the diplomatic mission of General Charles Mathieu Gardanne, Napoleon's envoy to Persia, who tried to combat British and Russian influence in the region. Fabvier was tasked with creating an artillery school and arsenal at Esfahān, and was awarded the newly constituted Order of the Lion and the Sun for his efforts.

In 1809, he returned to Europe via Russia, and served for a while as a volunteer in the Polish army of the Duchy of Warsaw. Arriving at Vienna, he was named captain in the French Imperial Guard. He served as aide-de-camp of Marshal Auguste de Marmont in Spain, and was sent by him to Russia to inform Napoleon on the Battle of Salamanca. He arrived at Napoleon's headquarters on 6 September 1812, the eve of the Battle of Borodino. Fabvier was gravely wounded in this battle, leading the charge during the final assault on the Russian fortifications. Napoleon rewarded him by naming him artillery major in the VI Corps under Marshal Ney. He distinguished himself further during the operations of the War of the Sixth Coalition in Germany, and was raised to colonel of the General Staff and made baron de l'Empire. He participated in the retreat into France, and on 31 March 1814, on behalf of Marshals Marmont and Mortier, he signed the surrender of Paris to the Coalition armies.

During the Hundred Days, he joined the frontier defence forces as a volunteer.

== Life after Napoleon ==
After Napoleon's downfall in 1815, he continued to serve in the royal French army. In 1817, he accompanied Marshal Marmont as chief of staff in quelling the riots at Lyon, provoked by the harsh conduct of the local military governor, General Simon Canuel. Soon after, he was suspended from his military duties for his liberal beliefs, and was arrested in August 1820 and charged with participation in a military conspiracy. Although he was released for lack of evidence, he was later called as a witness, but refused to disclose a name demanded by the public prosecutor, for which he was fined 500 francs.

In 1822, he was charged with aiding the flight of the four sergeants of La Rochelle, but was acquitted. In 1823 he decided to leave France and went to Greece, to help the Greeks during their ongoing War of Independence. His first task was the supervision of the fortifications of Navarino. Then he travelled to Britain to drum up support among the Philhellenes. Returning again to Greece, he was appointed head of the small Greek regular army, with which he participated in several battles, most notably the Siege of the Acropolis of Athens in 1826. In 1828, he returned to France, only to return to Greece alongside the French Morea expedition. For his services during the Greek War of Independence, the Third National Assembly at Troezen declared Fabvier an honorary Greek citizen in 1827, and he was later awarded the Grand Cross of the Order of the Redeemer by King Otho I.

In 1830, he returned to France and took part in the July Revolution. Initially chief of staff to General Étienne Maurice Gérard, on 4 August Fabvier was named military commander of Paris. In 1831, he resigned his commission and retired with the rank Lieutenant General. Fabvier was made a peer of France in 1845, and in 1848, he was sent as the French ambassador to Constantinople, and thereafter to Denmark. Back in France he was elected to the National Assembly of France as a representative of Meurthe. There he sided with the conservative group of the assembly. He retired from public life on 2 December 1851, and died in Paris four years later.
