= Siege of Athens =

The siege of Athens can refer to any of the following battles:

- Persian sack of Athens (480 BC) – during which the Persians besieged a group of holdouts in the Acropolis
- Siege of Athens (404 BC), the last battle in the Peloponnesian War
- Siege of Athens (287 BC), siege by Demetrius I of Macedon
- Siege of Athens and Piraeus (87–86 BC), siege by Lucius Cornelius Sulla Felix during the First Mithridatic War
- Sack of Athens by the Heruli in 267 AD
- Sack of Athens by the Visigoths in 395 AD
- Sack of Athens during the Slavic incursions in 582 AD
- Siege of the Acropolis (1402–03) by Antonio I Acciaioli against Venice
- Siege of the Acropolis (1456–58) by the Ottomans against the Latin Duchy of Athens
- Siege of the Acropolis (1687) by the Venetians against the Ottomans, during the Morean War
- Siege of the Acropolis (1821–22) by the Greeks against the Ottomans, during the Greek War of Independence
- Siege of the Acropolis (1826–27) by the Ottomans against the Greeks, during the Greek War of Independence
