= All Saints Hove =

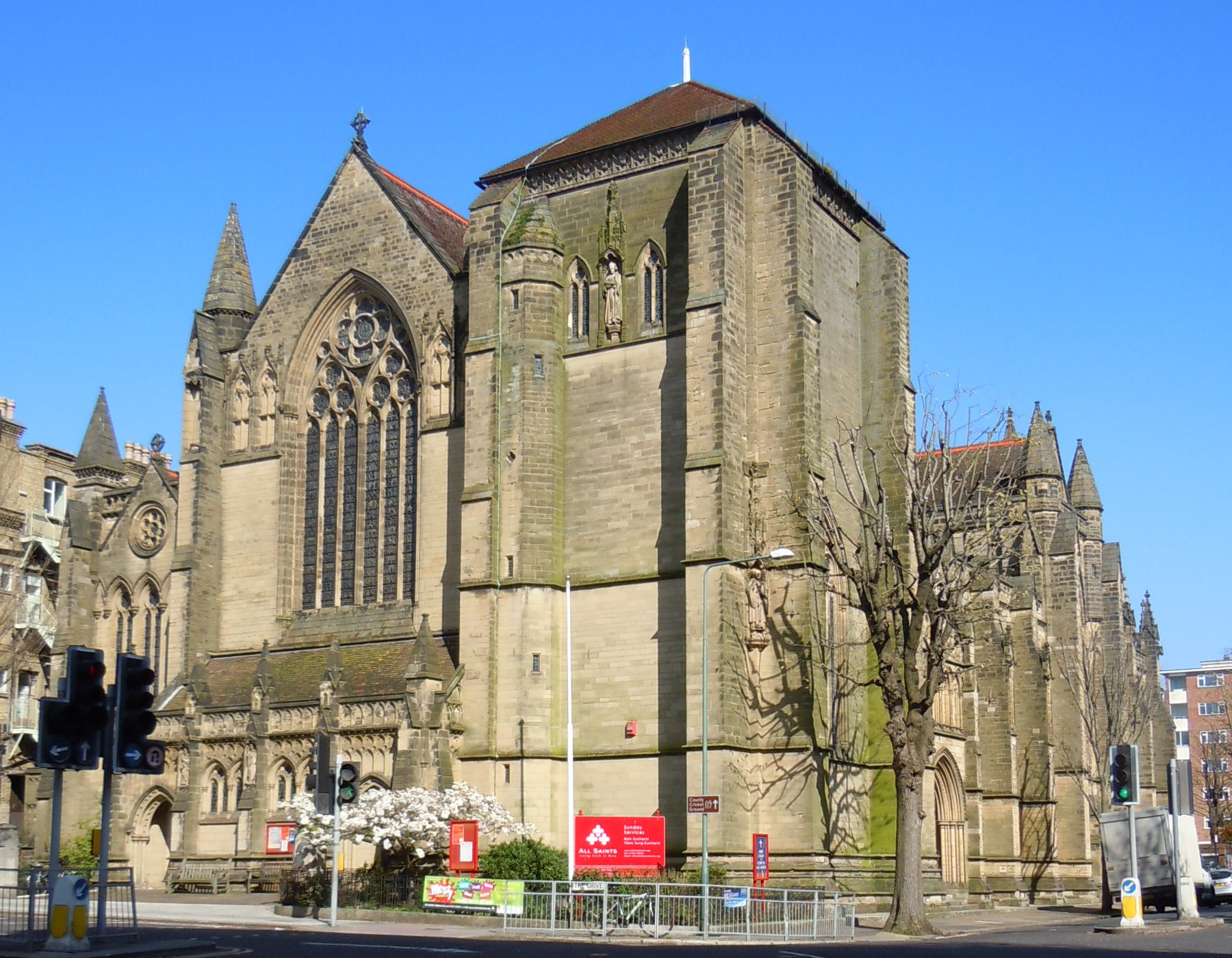
- The church from the southwest
- All Saints Hove
- 50.8303°N 0.1674°W
- Denomination: Church of England
- Churchmanship: Inclusive Catholic
- Website: https://allsaintshove.org

History
- Dedication: All Saints

Administration
- Province: Canterbury
- Diocese: Chichester
- Archdeaconry: Brighton and Lewes
- Deanery: Rural Deanery of Hove
- Parish: Hove, All Saints

Clergy
- Priest: The Revd Catriona Cumming

Listed Building – Grade I
- Official name: Church of All Saints
- Designated: 24 March 1950
- Reference no.: 1187592

All Saints Hove is an Anglican church in Hove, part of the English city of Brighton and Hove. It has served as the parish church for the whole of Hove since 1892, and stands in a prominent location at a major crossroads in central Hove.

== History ==
The present parishes of Hove and Preston had been united as a single benefice, Hove-cum-Preston, since 1531. St Andrew's Church, of Saxon origin but rebuilt from a near-derelict state in 1836 in response to the area's growing population, had served as Hove-cum-Preston's parish church. When the parish was separated into two new areas serving Hove and Preston respectively in 1879, St Andrew's status was changed to that of parish church of Hove. However, when Revd Thomas Peacey was appointed the first vicar of Hove in the same year, he immediately showed his intention of replacing it with a new, more impressive church by selecting the prominent ecclesiastical architect John Loughborough Pearson to submit a design.

Construction did not begin until 1889, with the first stone being laid on 25 April 1889; during the 1880s, Pearson had been working on various projects, including the vicarage (on the same plot of land) and the nearby St Barnabas Church. The church was built, opened and consecrated in stages: the nave and side aisles, forming the core of the present building and costing £14,000, were opened in 1891 after a consecration ceremony by the Bishop of Chichester (Richard Durnford, who personally gave £1,000 towards the cost of the church) on 1 May 1891; the eastern end was not finished until 1901, four years after Pearson's death—its completion was overseen by his son, and the new Bishop of Chichester, Ernest Roland Wilberforce consecrated it on 1 November 1901; and an incomplete tower on the southwestern side, and an adjacent narthex, were provided in 1924. The tower has never been finished, although its interior does feature a statue of Revd Peacey holding a model of the church. By this time, £40,000 had been spent on construction.

All Saints became the parish church of Hove in 1892, replacing St Andrew's. It also serves the smaller Parish of Hove All Saints, which includes the former church of St Thomas the Apostle; this was declared redundant in 1993 and is now the Coptic Orthodox church of St Mary and St Abraam. The area covered by the parish of Hove All Saints covers most of eastern Hove to the border with Brighton, stretches from the seafront to the A270 Old Shoreham Road and is one of the most populous parishes in the Chichester diocese.

== Architecture ==
All Saints is an imposing church—one of the largest of the 19th-century Gothic revival—and bears some resemblance to one of John Loughborough Pearson's largest ecclesiastical projects, Truro Cathedral. Pearson used local sandstone for the exterior, in contrast to the knapped flintwork and red brick decoration of his other Hove church, St Barnabas; and the predominant architectural style, the Early English Decorated style, is also markedly different from his other major churches, mostly in the London area. The interior is also of stone, usually only seen in the grandest of mediaeval buildings, and the great roof is constructed of Sussex oak. The narthex at the western end leads through to a very wide nave with aisles and tall arcades on both sides (likened by Pevsner to those of Exeter Cathedral) and a chancel with side chapels. One of these is separated from the body of the church by a canopied screen of great richness carved in wood, dedicated to people from the parish killed in the First World War. The church is dominated by a stone reredos carved by Nathaniel Hitch and installed in 1908. Pearson used a clever conceit in the design of the church to produce a visual concentration on the reredos, and the east end of the church was described by the architect Harry Stuart Goodhart-Rendel "as nearly perfect as can be". Nikolaus Pevsner described the building as "superb and cathedral-like". Other internal fixtures include oak choir stalls and canopies designed by Frank Loughborough Pearson in memory of Thomas Peacey, a stone pulpit and red marble seven sided font. There is also a complete scheme of stained glass windows by the eminent firm of Clayton & Bell, including the great west window, which commemorates King Edward VII—who in 1896, before his accession to the throne, had attended a service at the church. The great organ was built by the firm of William Hill & Son, London, originally provided with 14 organ stops when installed in 1894, then enlarged to 48 speaking stops (including the only full-length 32' Open Wood stop between London and Winchester) in 1905; in 1915 it was encased in a double fronted organ-case of magnificent proportions designed by Frank Loughborough Pearson. The organ was restored in 1987 and was one of the first to be awarded a historic organ certificate by the British Institute of Organ Studies as being of international importance. It has informed the restoration of other large Hill organs, including those of Peterborough and Lichfield cathedrals and also Eton College.

== All Saints Hove today ==
The church is regularly open to casual visitors, and is often used as a venue for live music, in addition to holding services several days a week. Sunday school and crèche facilities are also provided. The architectural importance of the building has been recognised through the award of Grade I listed status, which is granted to "buildings of outstanding or national architectural or historic interest".

== Vicarage ==
The last vicar of the united parish of Hove-cum-Preston, Revd Walter Kelly, had built a vicarage for the parish, but after the split it lay within the boundaries of Preston parish. Revd Peacey acted quickly to get Hove its own vicarage, obtaining land from the estate of the Stanford family upon which both a vicarage and a church could be built. The Stanfords had acquired large areas of land around Preston and Hove in the 18th century, after Preston Manor had come into the family, but by the late 19th century much of it was being developed for residential use. A plot of land in the area then known as "West Brighton", on the corner of the roads which became Eaton Road and The Drive, was secured, and John Loughborough Pearson was asked to design and build a vicarage that would complement the church although its design predated that of the church as built by several years. The red-brick building, constructed in 1883, has elements of the Renaissance style of 400 years previously and is listed at Grade II.

== Gallery ==
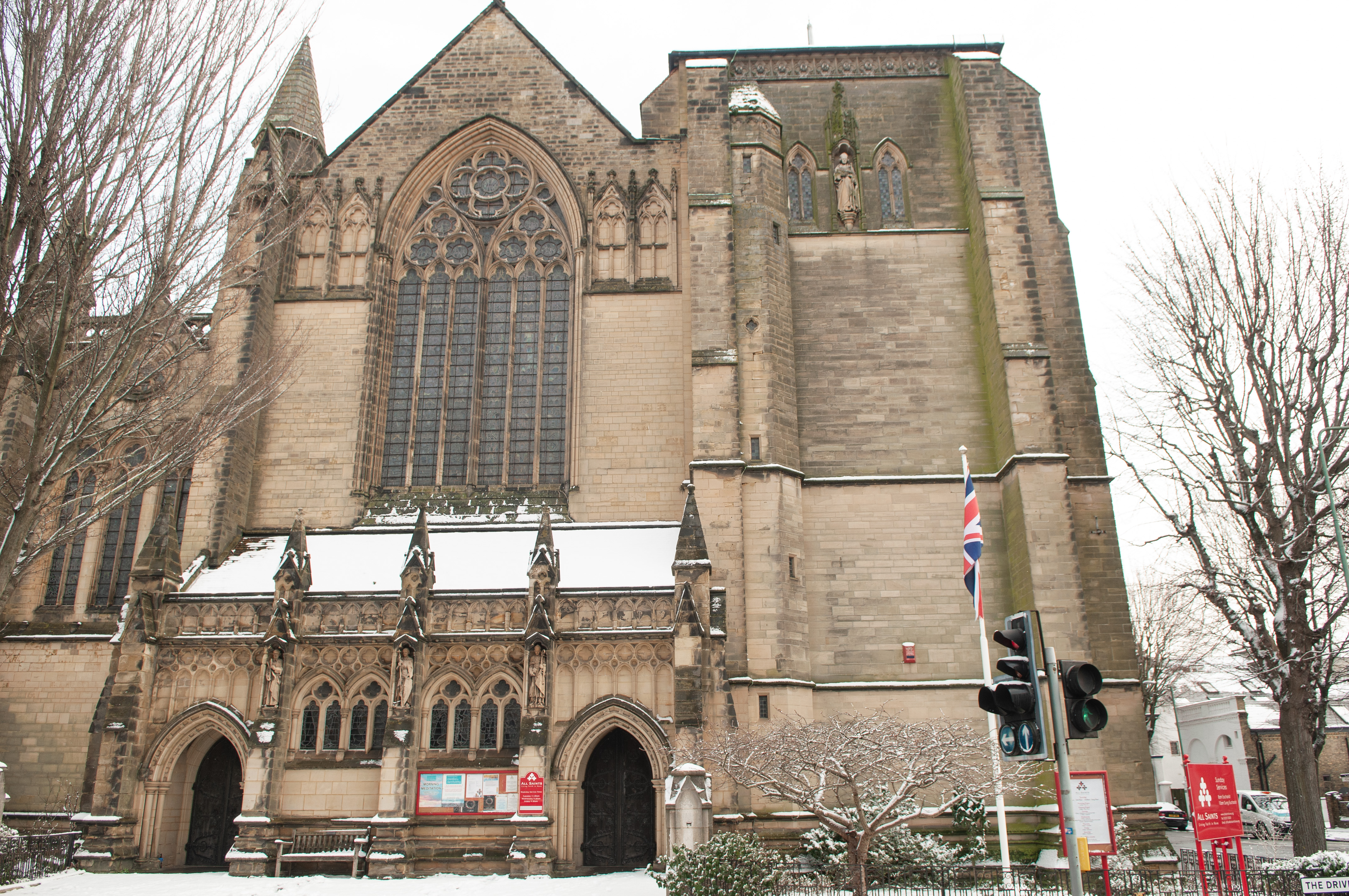
The west elevation, showing the narthex, west window, and incomplete tower

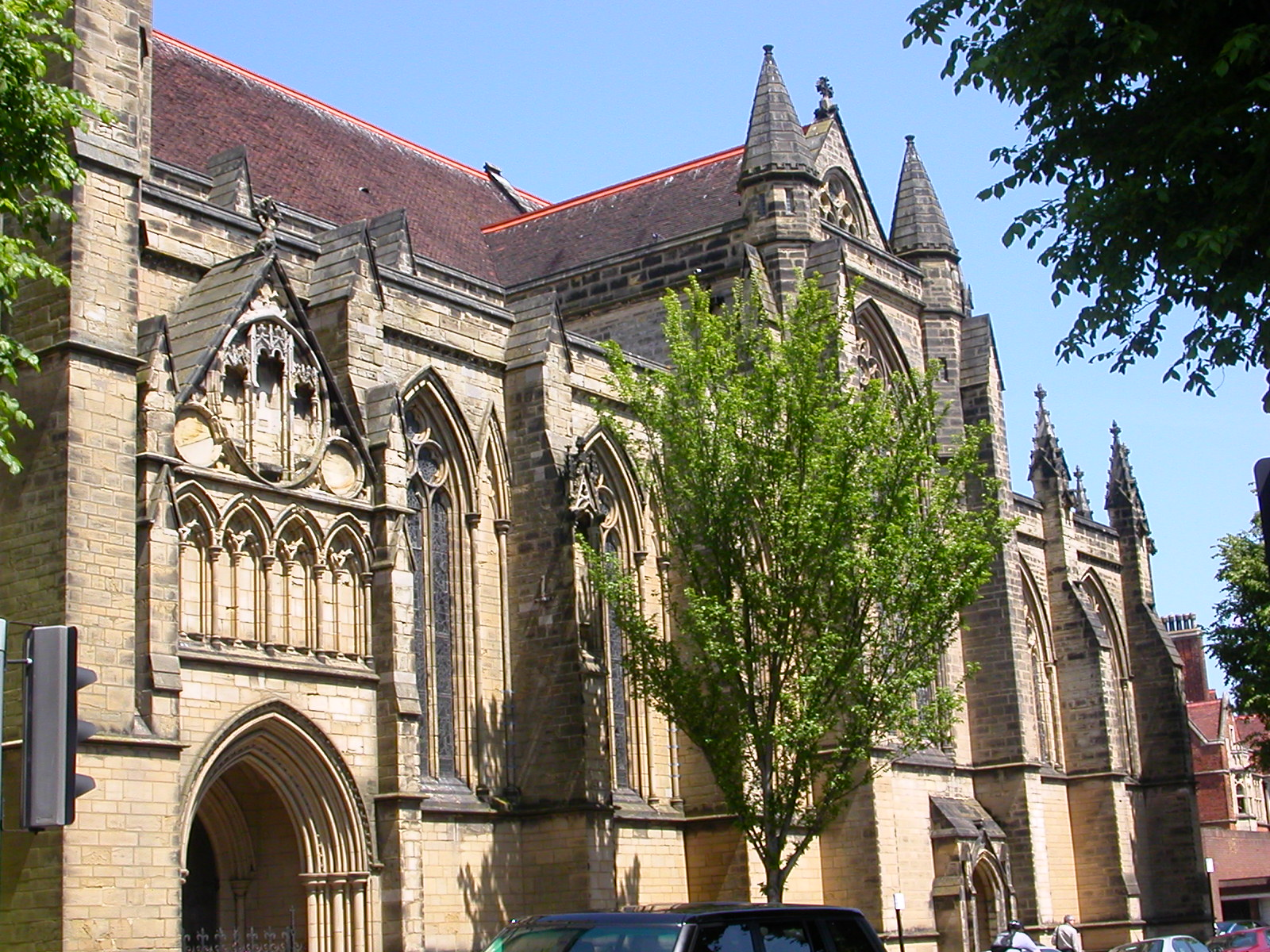
The southern elevation, looking to the northeast

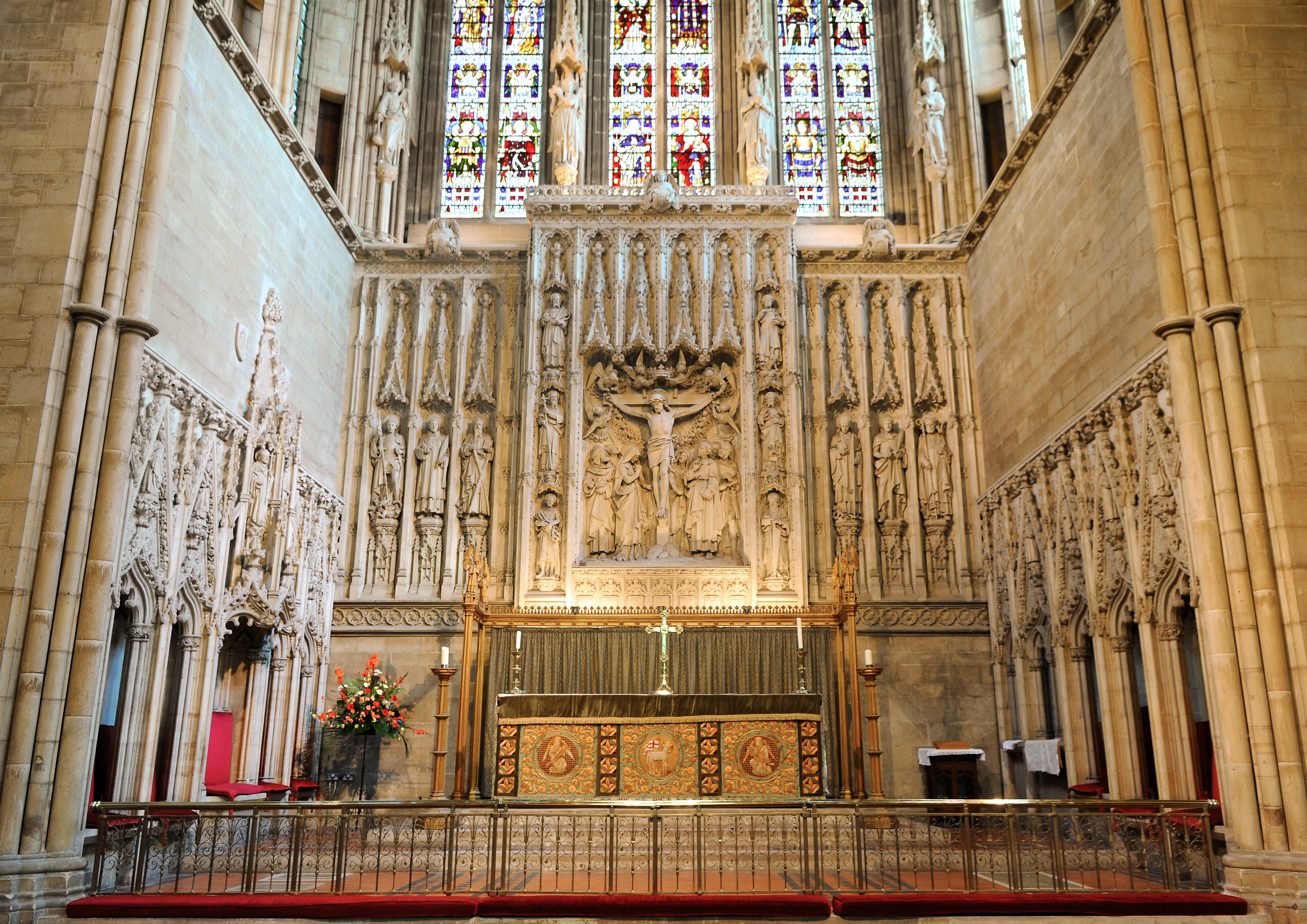
High altar, reredos, sedilia, and part of the east window

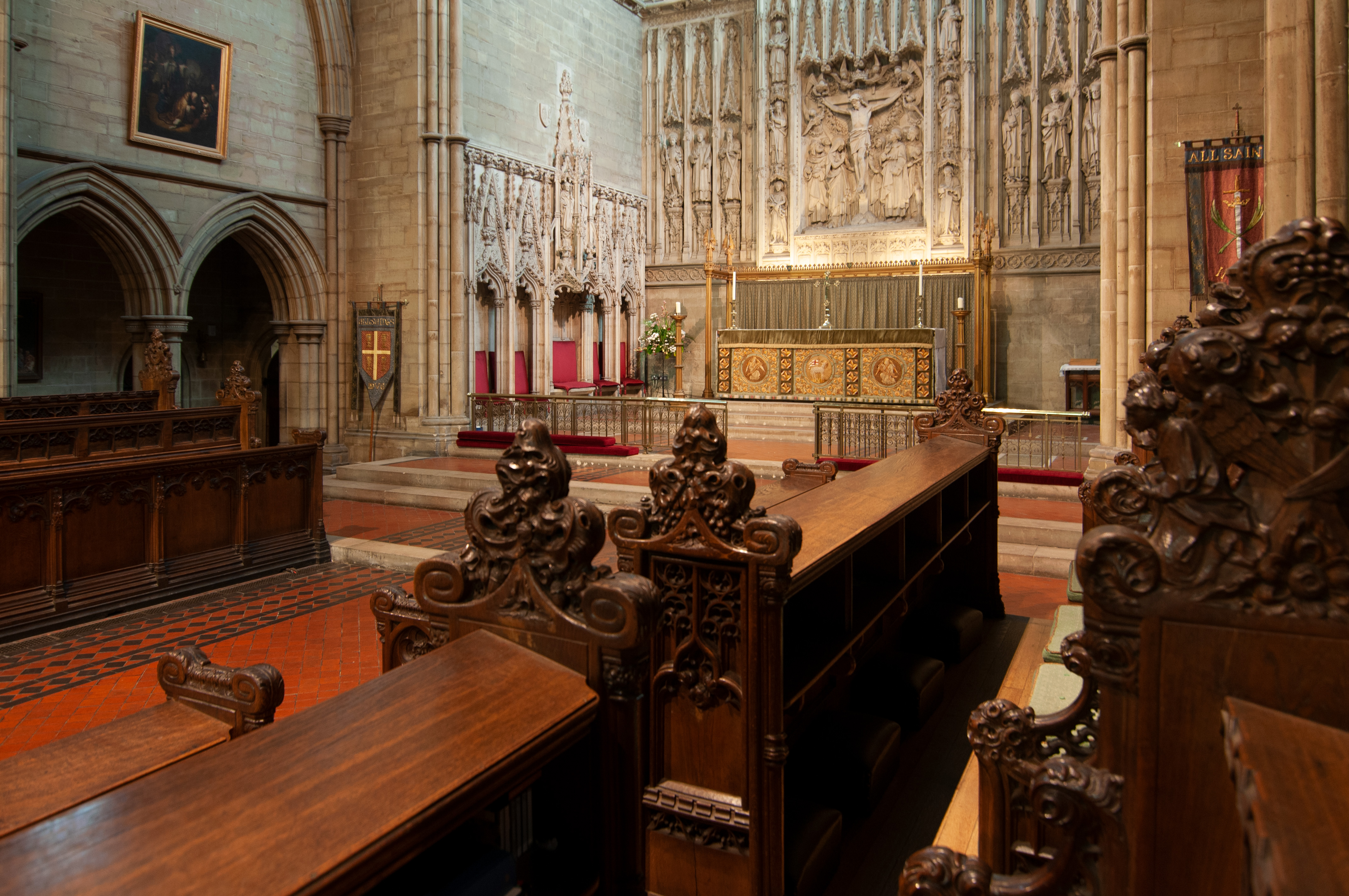
High altar, reredos, and sedilia, as seen from the south choir stalls

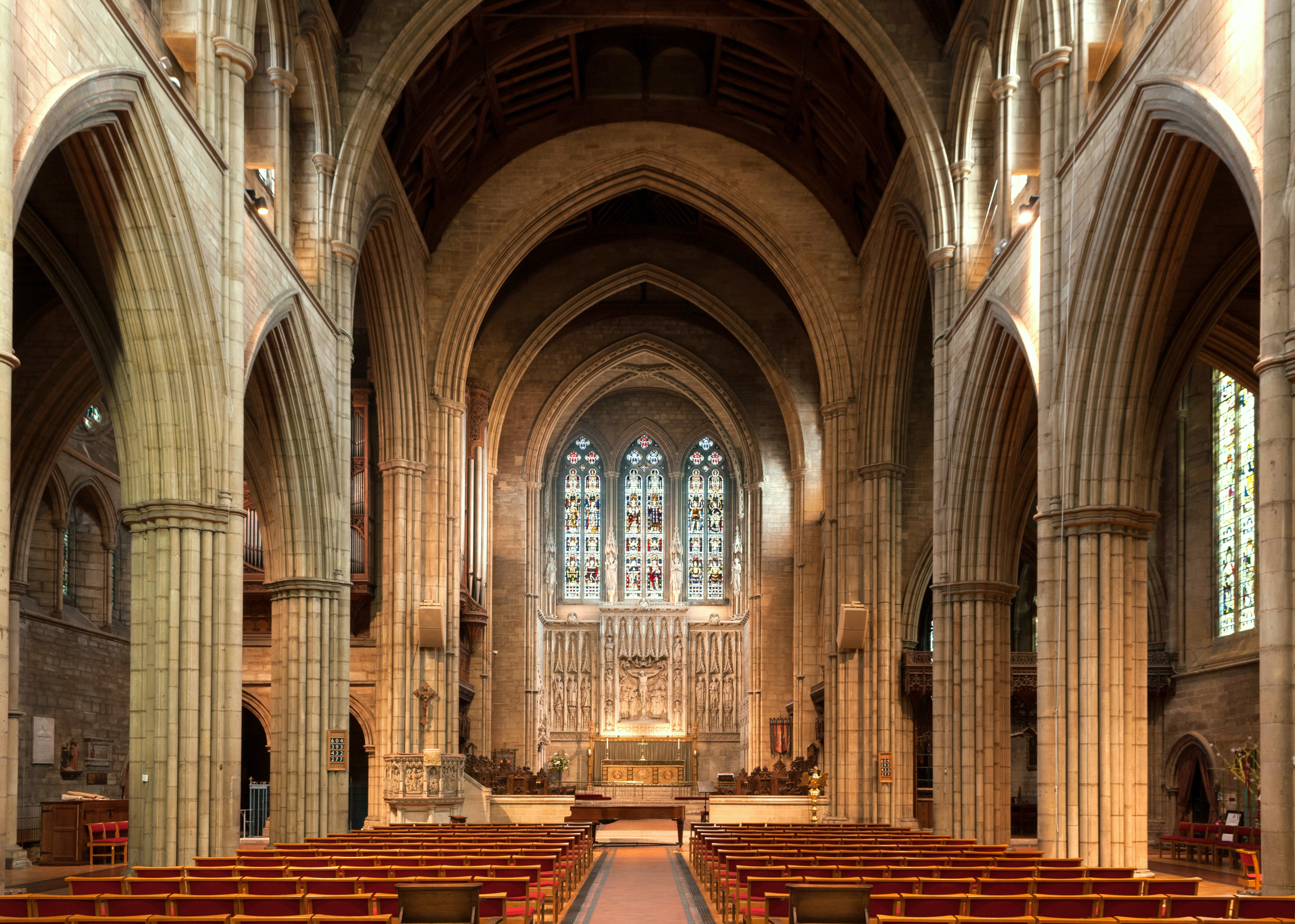
Nave, looking east

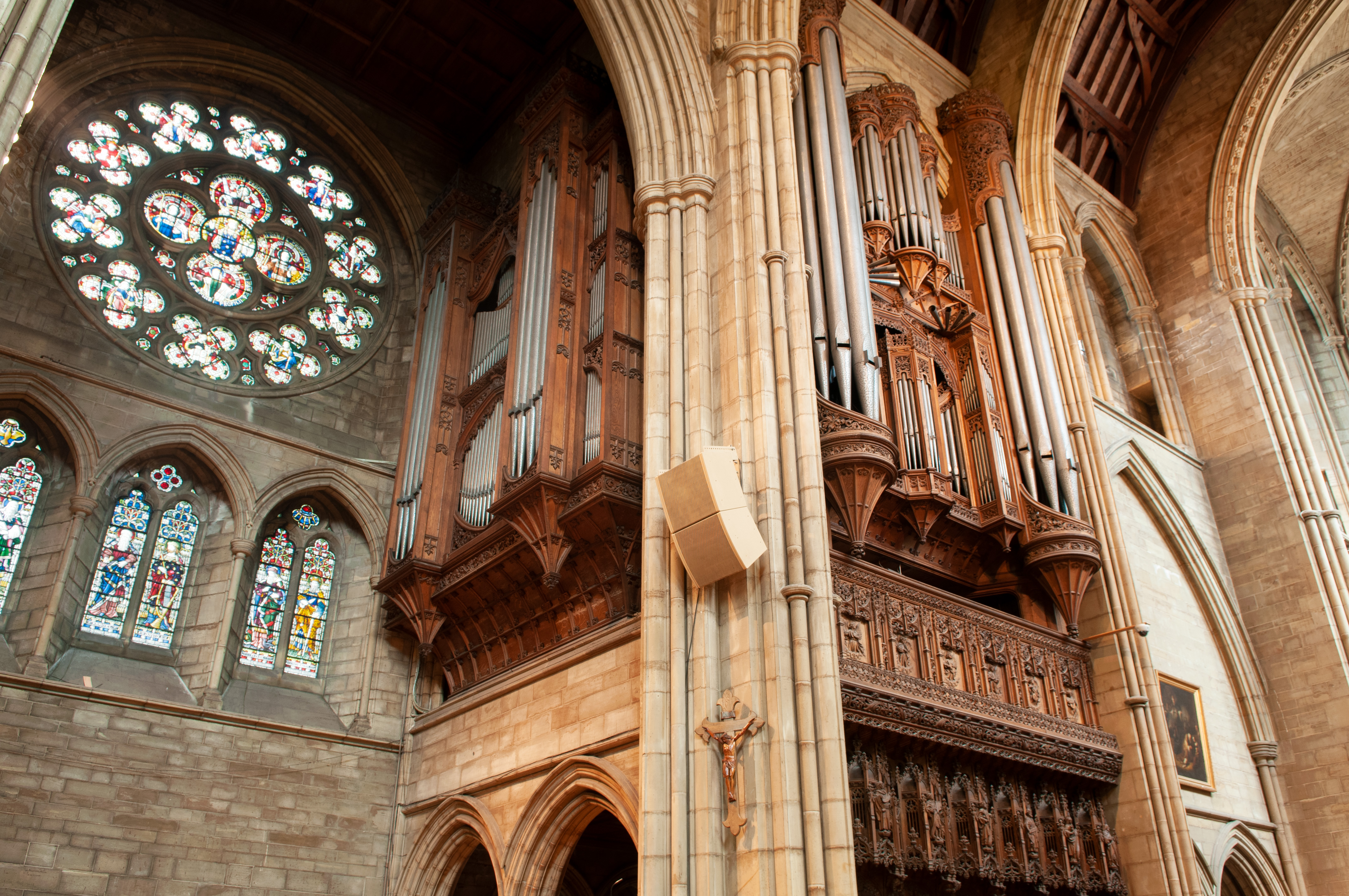
The double-fronted gothic organ case, designed by the architect's son, and north transept (rose) window

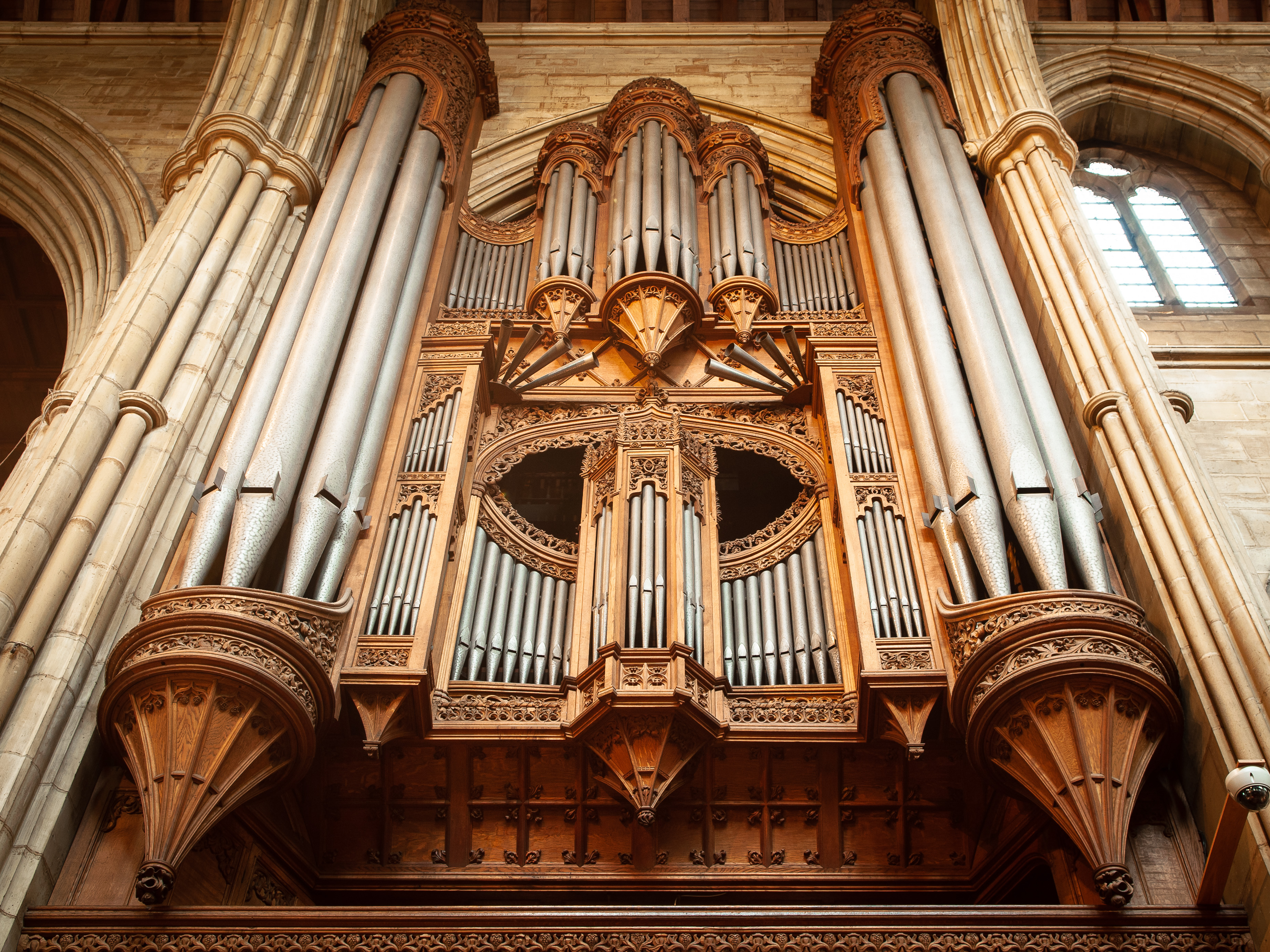
Chancel façade of the pipe organ

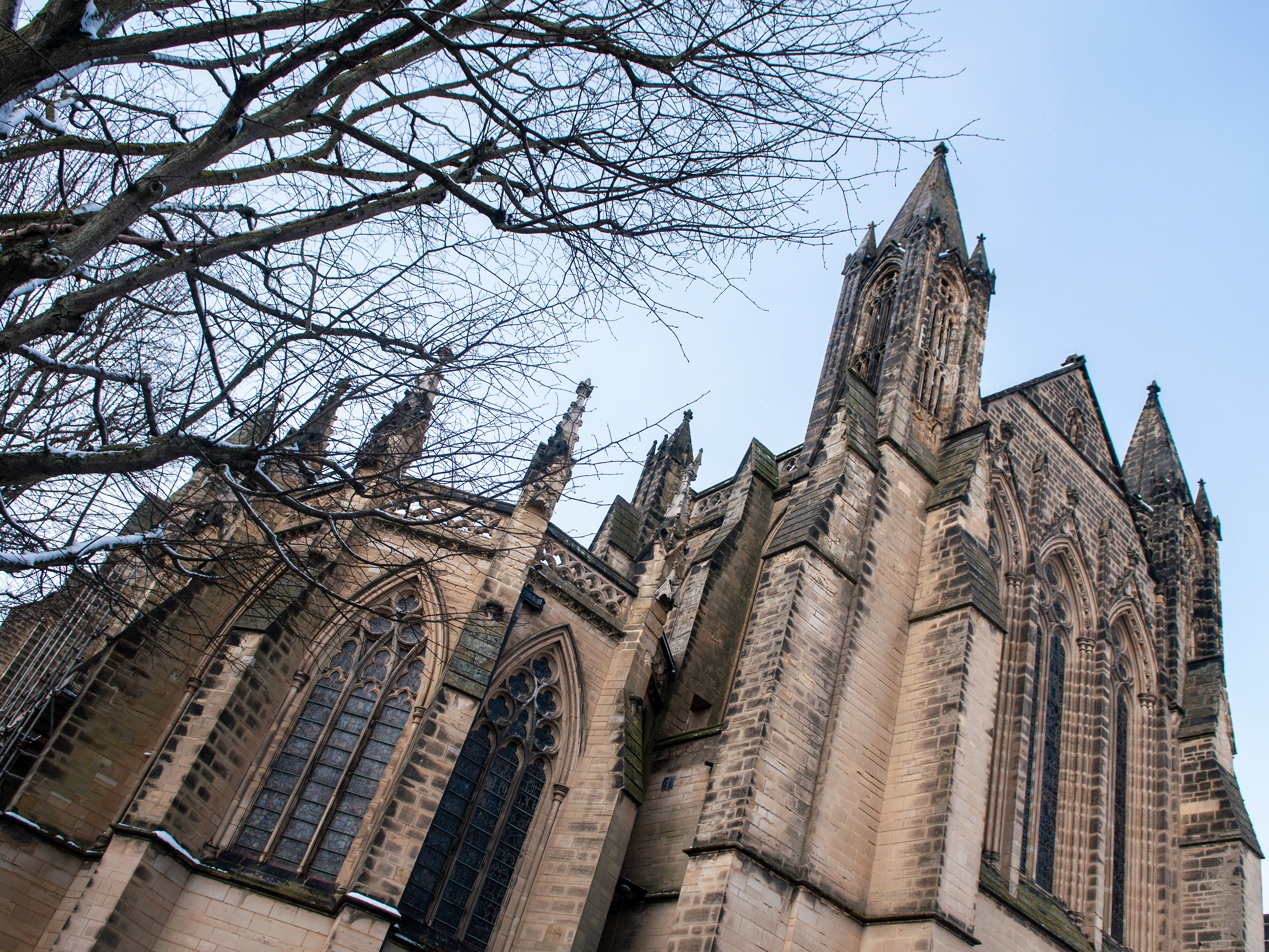
View of the east end including chapel apse, east window and towers

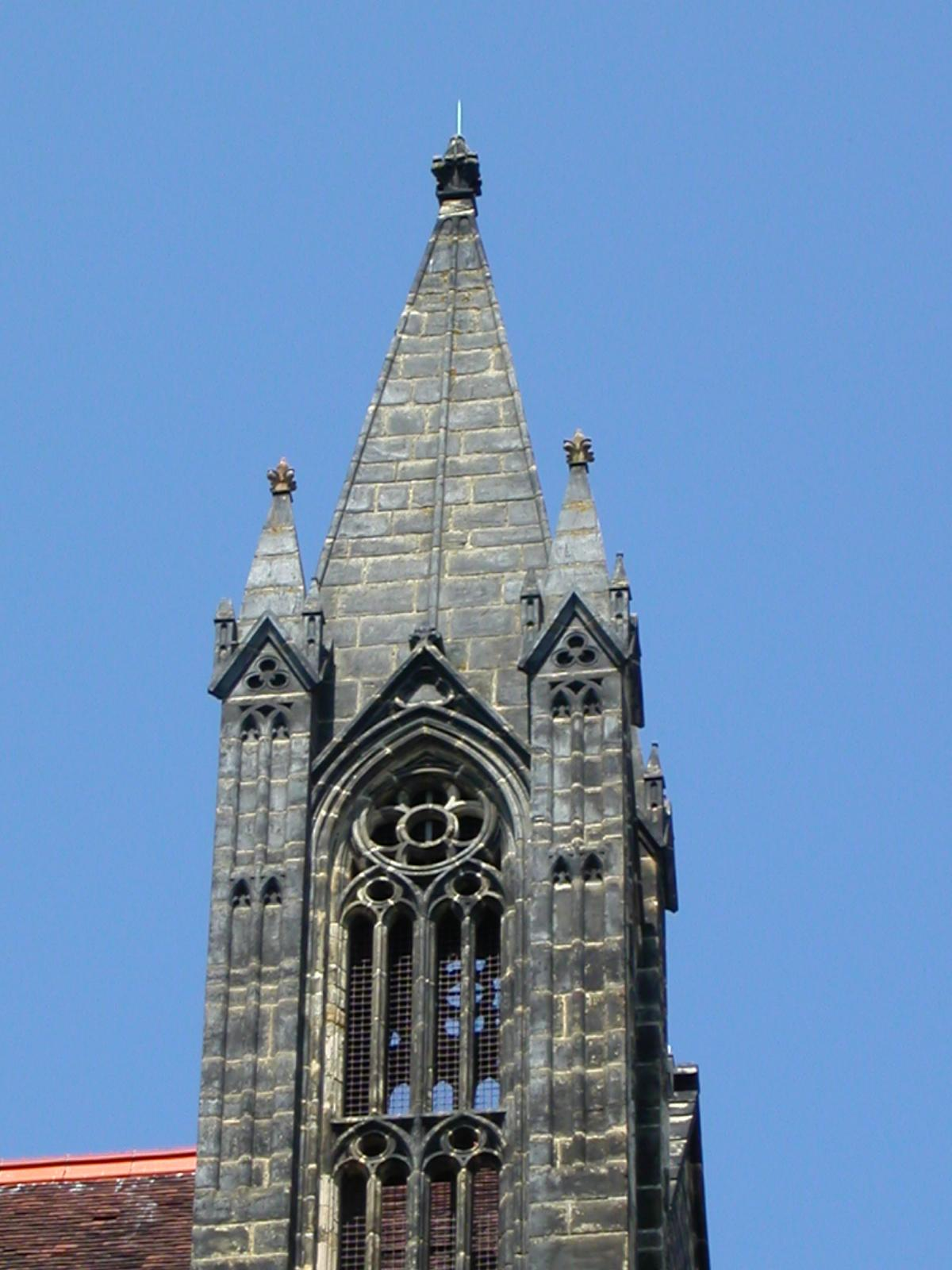
Small spire on the eastern end

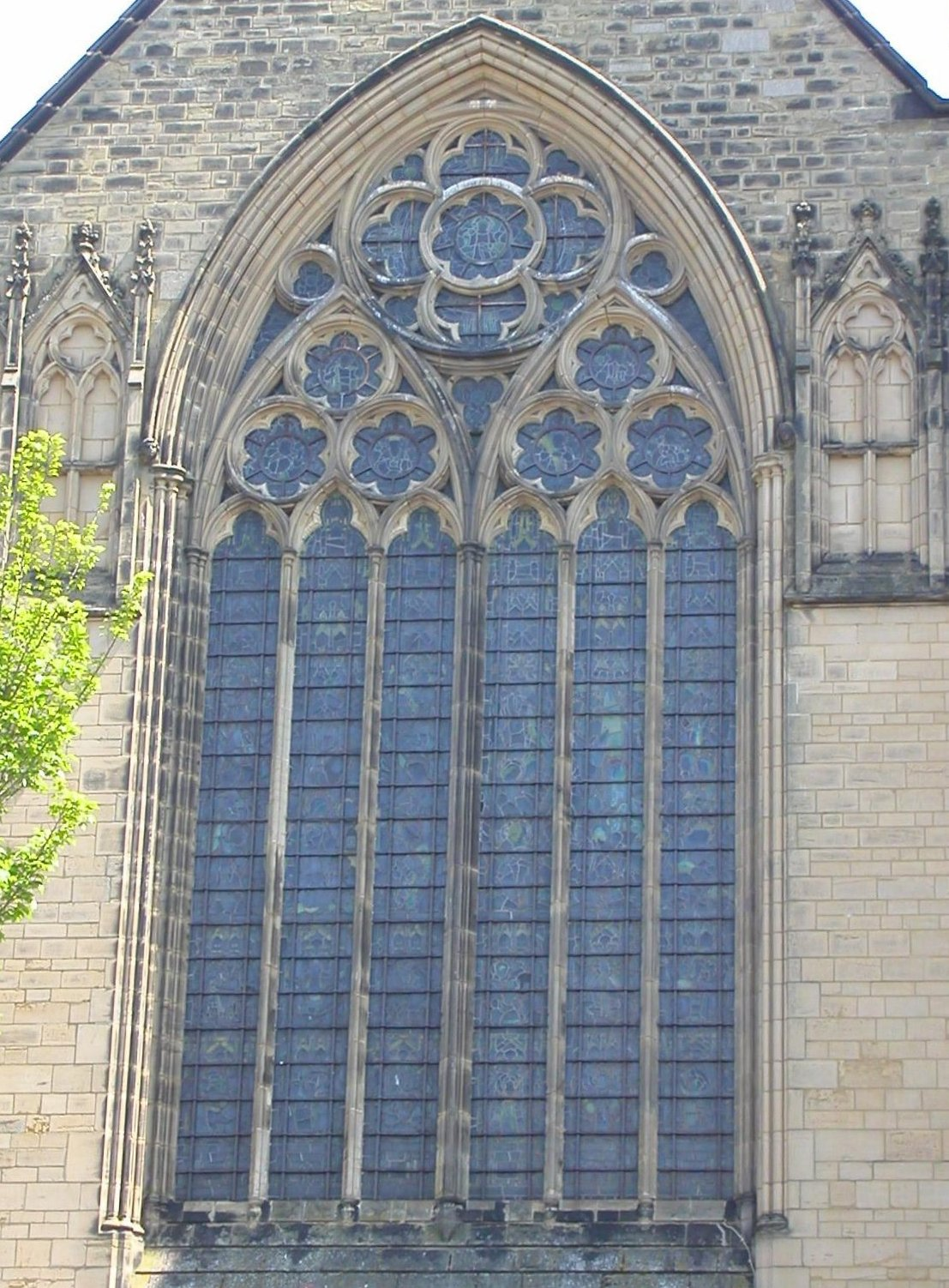
The west window, commemorating King Edward VII

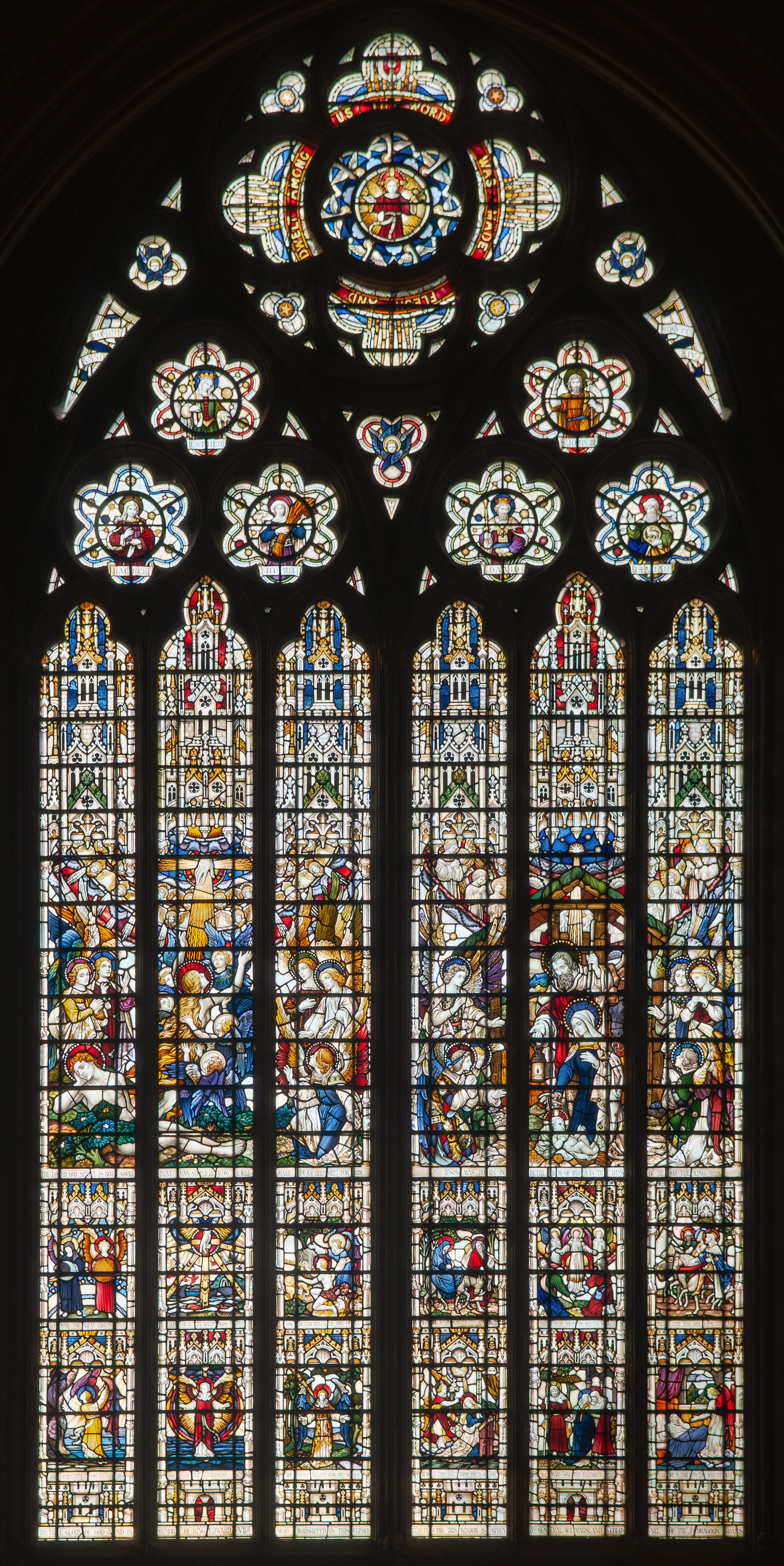
West window, viewed from inside

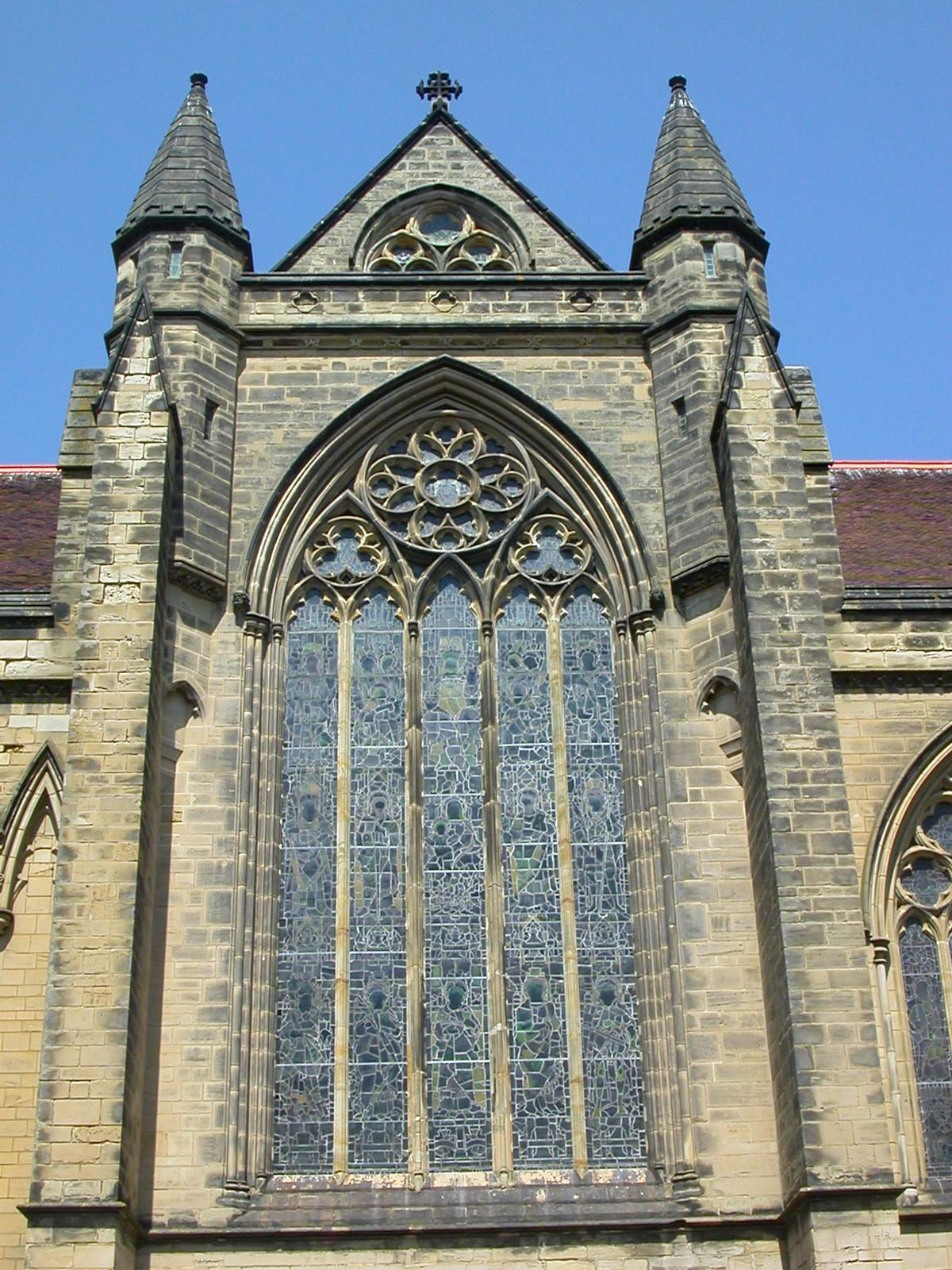
One of the stained glass windows on the southern elevation

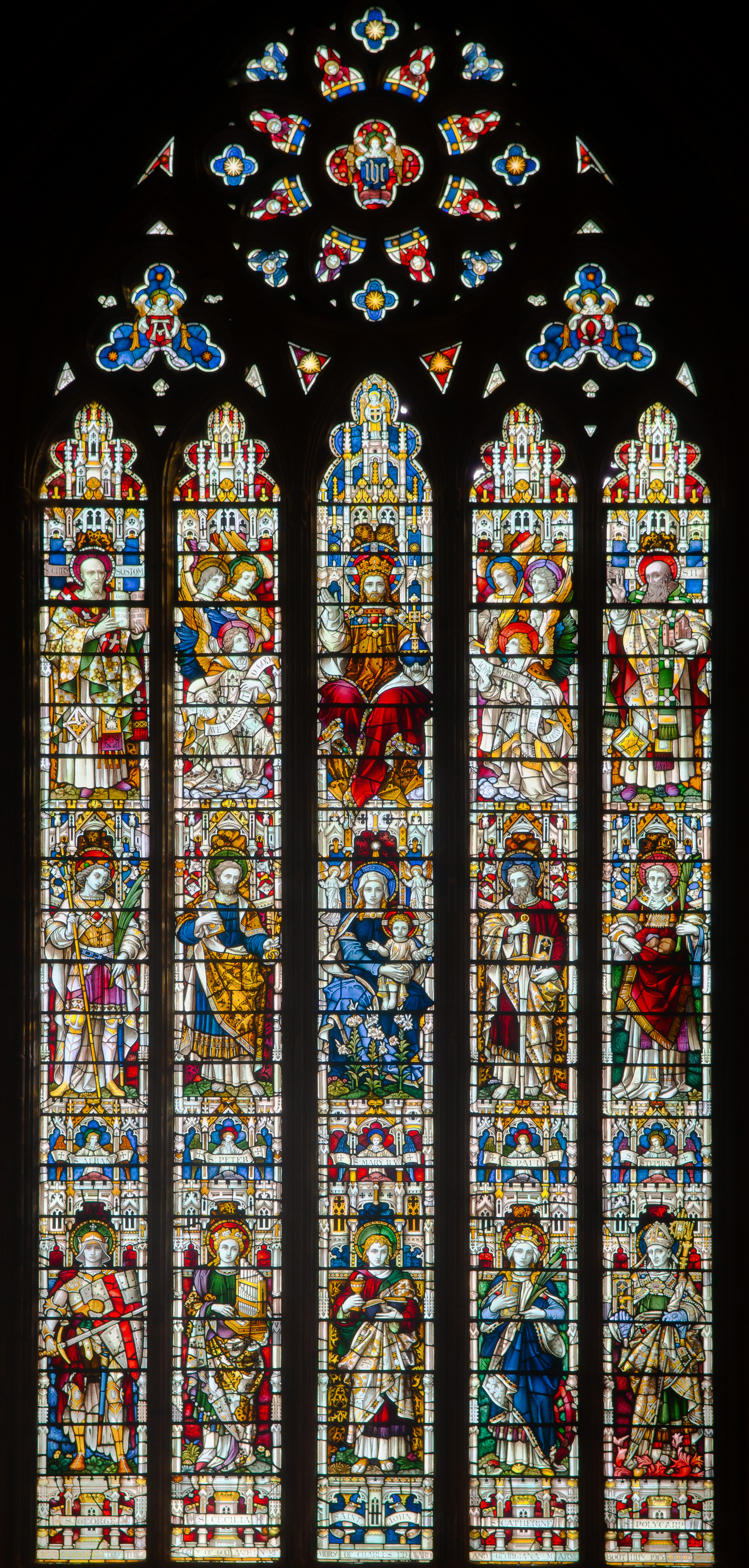
South window, viewed from inside

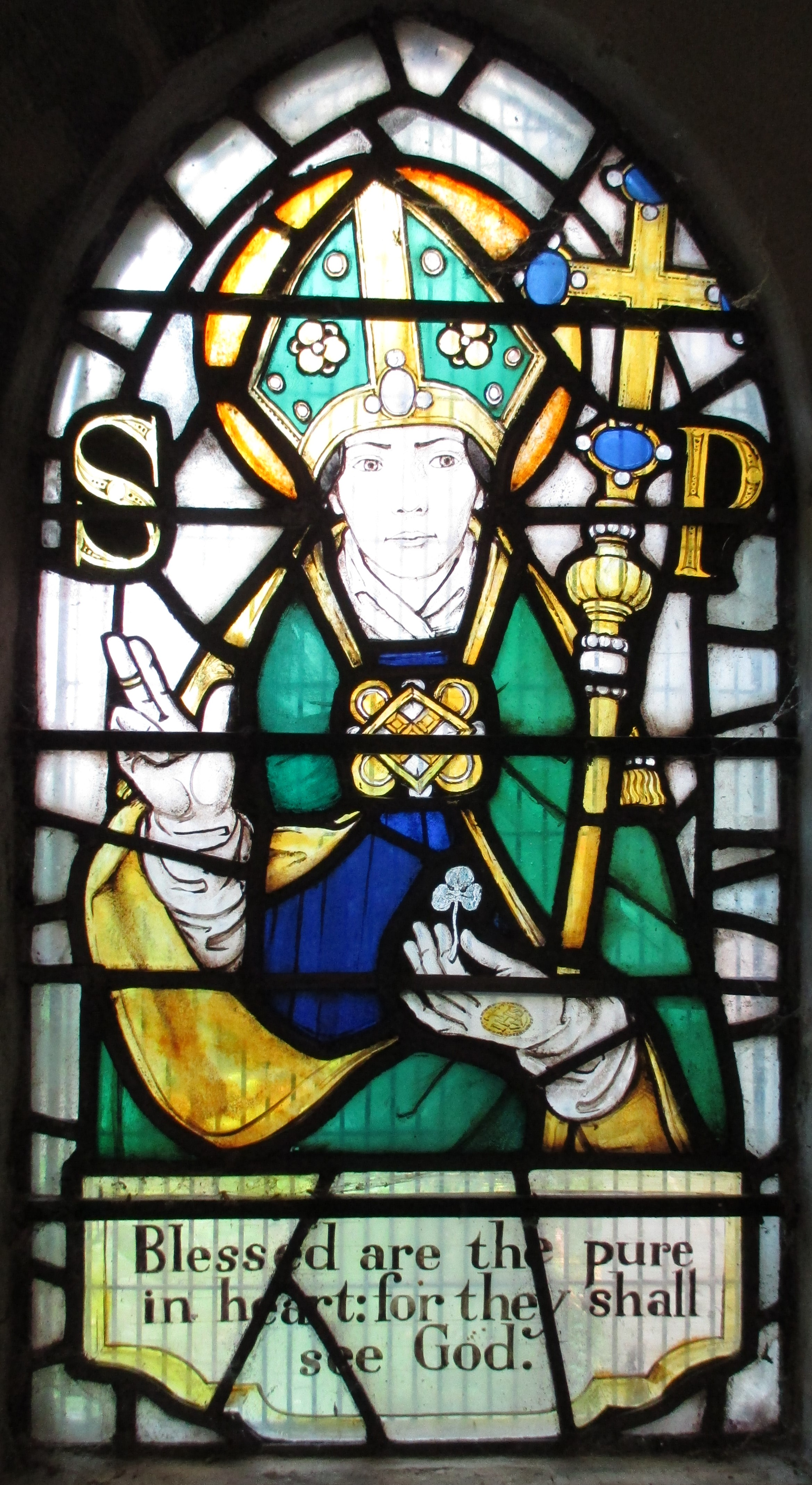
North window of the narthex, designed by Martin Travers

== See also ==
- Grade I listed buildings in Brighton and Hove
- List of places of worship in Brighton and Hove
- List of new ecclesiastical buildings by J. L. Pearson
