= List of Musical: The Prince of Tennis productions =

The Prince of Tennis Musical (ミュージカル・テニスの王子様, Myūjikaru Tenisu no Ōji-sama), also known as "TeniPuri Musical", "Tenimyu" or "GekiPuri" (Stage Prince), is a series of live action stage musicals directed by Yukio Ueshima based on manga series The Prince of Tennis created by Takeshi Konomi and serialized by Shueisha in Weekly Shonen Jump.

The first musical premièred in the Golden Week of 2003, and the unexpected popularity, especially among girls, and requests for merchandise of the show encouraged Marvelous Entertainment to follow through with the series.

In May 2010, after 7 years, 22 musicals, 5 main casts and about 150 different actors had passed, the "first season" came to an end with the last performance of Dream Live 7th on the 23rd. Not too long after the end of the first season the start of a "second season" was commenced. The shows featured a completely new cast and a new script, but covered the same arcs as the first season.

== First season ==
=== Locations ===
Musical	Year	Location/date	Director/choreographer	Screenplay	Music	Notes	Ref
Prince of Tennis	2003	Tokyo Metropolitan Art Space (30 April–5 May); Nippon Seinen-kan Hall (7-8 Aug); Sankei Hall (13-15 Aug)	Yukio Ueshima	Yuuji Mitsuya		The first arc of the story, from Ryoma Echizen's arrival to up to the end of the Seigaku ranking matches.	
1st Match	2003–2004	Yuupouto kan'i hoken Hall (30-31 Dec); Mielparque Hall (1-5 Jan)	Yukio Ueshima	Yuuji Mitsuya	Toshihiko Sahashi	Matches between Seigaku and rival school Fudomine Chuu.	
Dream Live 1st	2004	Tokyo Metropolitan Gymnasium (13 June)	Yukio Ueshima	Yuuji Mitsuya	Toshihiko Sahashi	First live concert, featuring songs from the two previous musicals.	
More Than Limit	2004	Tokyo Metropolitan Art Space (29 July-8 Aug); Shinkobe Oriental Theater (11-15 Aug)	Yukio Ueshima	Yuuji Mitsuya	Toshihiko Sahashi	Matches between Seigaku and the rival school St. Rudolph Gakuin.	
Special Match	2004–2005	Tokyo Metropolitan Art Space (29 Dec-2 Jan)	Yukio Ueshima	Yuuji Mitsuya	Toshihiko Sahashi	Matches between Seigaku and rival school Fudomine Chuu.	
Side Yamabuki	2005	Osaka Mielparque Hall (8-10 Jan); Mielparque Tokyo; (20-23 Jan)	Yukio Ueshima		Toshihiko Sahashi	Matches between Seigaku and rival school Yamabuki Chuu.	
Dream Live 2nd	2005	Tokyo Bay NK Hall (4 May)	Yukio Ueshima		Toshihiko Sahashi	Second live concert, featuring songs from all previous musicals.	
Imperial Match	2005–2006	Nippon Seinen-kan Hall (8-14 Aug and 19-25 Dec); Osaka Mielparque Hall (17-20 Aug and 28 Dec-2 Jan)	Yukio Ueshima	Yuuji Mitsuya	Toshihiko Sahashi	Matches between Seigaku and rival school Hyoutei Gakuen. This was a re-run of the Imperial Match Hyoutei Gakuen and guest starring members of Fudomine, St. Rudolph and Yamabuki Chuu.	
Dream Live 3rd	2006	Zepp DiverCity (28–29 March)	Yukio Ueshima		Toshihiko Sahashi	Third live concert, featuring songs from The Imperial Match Hyotei Gakuen in winter musicals. Graduation concert for the entire second Seigaku cast except for Hiroki Aiba. Guest starring all members of Hyotei.	
Advancement Match	2006	Nippon Seinen-kan Hall (3-13 Aug); Osaka Mielparque Hall (16-19 Aug); Meitestu Hall (24-27 Aug)	Yukio Ueshima	Yuuji Mitsuya	Toshihiko Sahashi	Matches between Seigaku and rival school Rokkaku Chuu.	
1st Service	2006–2007	Nippon Seinen-kan Hall (13-25 Dec); Osaka Mielparque Hall (28 Dec-8 Jan); Kanagawa Kenmin Hall (11-14 Jan); Sunshine Theatre (18-21 Jan); Nagoya Shimin Kaikan-chuu Hall (25-27 Jan	Yukio Ueshima	Yuuji Mitsuya	Toshihiko Sahashi	Doubles matches of Seigaku against rival school Rikkai Daigaku Fuzoku.	
Dream Live 4th	2007	Pacifico Yokohama (30–31 March); Umeda Arts Theater (17–20 May)	Yukio Ueshima	Yuuji Mitsuya	Toshihiko Sahashi	Fourth live concert, featuring members of Fudomine, St. Rudolph, Yamabuki Chuu, Hyotei Gakuen, Rokkaku Chuu and Rikkai Daigaku Fuzoku as special guests.	
2nd Service	2007	Nippon Seinen-kan Hall (2-15 Aug); Osaka Mielparque Halla (18-25 Aug); Kanagawa Kenmin Hall (28-29 Aug); Fukuoka Shimin Kaikan Dai Hall (1-2 Sep); Gifu Shimin Kaikan Dai Hall (7-9 Sep)	Yukio Ueshima	Yuuji Mitsuya	Toshihiko Sahashi	Singles matches of Seigaku against rival school Rikkai Daigaku Fuzoku. Graduation show for the 3rd Seigaku cast, except Tomo Yanagishita.	
Progressive Match	2007–2008	Nippon Seinen-kan Hall (12-25 Dec); Osaka Mielparque Hall (28 Dec-6 January); Kagawa Kenmin Hall (11-14 Jan); Chukyo University Center for Culture & Arts (17-20 Jan); Komatsu Arts Theatre Urara Dai-Hall (25-27 Jan); Momochi Palace Fukuoka (31 Jan-3 Feb); Ichinoseki Cultural Center (9-11 Feb)	Yukio Ueshima (director/choreo) and Shinnosuke Motoyama (choreo)	Hideki Mitsui	Toshihiko Sahashi (music); Yuuuji Mitsuya (lyrics)	Matches between Seigaku and rival school Higa Chuu.	
Dream Live 5th	2008	Yokohama Arena (17–18 May); Kobe World Memorial Hall (24–25 May)	Yukio Ueshima (director/choreo) and Shinnosuke Motoyama (choreo)		Toshihiko Sahashi (music); Yuuuji Mitsuya (lyrics)	Fifth live concert.	
Imperial Presence	2008	Nippon Seinen-kan Hall (29 July-17 August); Osaka Mielparque Hall (20-24 Aug); Hiroshima Kōsei Nenkin Kaikan (30-31 Aug); Fukuoka Shimin Kaikan (5-7 Sep); Niigata Prefectural Civic Center (13-15 Sep); Nagano Shimin Kaikan (19-21 Sep); Minami Souma Shimin Bunka Kaikan (26-28 Sep); Aichi Kinro Kaikan (3-5 Oct); NOVEL HALL (Taiwan; 10–12 October); COEX (17-19 Oct); Tokyo Metropolitan Art Space Chuu-Hall (30 Oct-3 Nov)	Yukio Ueshima (director/choreo) and Shinnosuke Motoyama (choreo)	Hideki Mitsui	Toshihiko Sahashi (music); Yuuuji Mitsuya (lyrics)	Matches of Seigaku against rival school Hyotei Gakuen in the National tournament.	
Treasure Match	2008–2009	Nippon Seinen-kan Hall (13-25 Dec and 26–31 March); Osaka Mielparque Hall (28 Dec-4 Jan); Shizuoka-city Shimizu Cultural Center (10-12 Jan); Ishikawa Kouseinenkin Kaikan (17-18 Jan); Aichi Kinro Kaikan (23-25 Jan); Fukuoka Shimin Kaikan Dai-Hall (6-7 Feb); Hiroshima Kōsei Nenkin Kaikan (14-15 Feb); Shimonoseki Shimin Kaikan Dai-Hall (21-22 Feb); Iwate Prefectural Hall (28 Feb-1 March); Novel Hall Shinbutai (Taiwan; 20–22 March)	Yukio Ueshima (director/choreo) and Shinnosuke Motoyama (choreo)	Hideki Mitsui	Toshihiko Sahashi (music); Yuuuji Mitsuya (lyrics)	Matches between Seigaku and rival school Shitenhouji.	
Dream Live 6th	2009	Tokyo Metropolitan Gymnasium (2–3 May); Kobe World Memorial Hall (9–10 May)	Yukio Ueshima (director/choreo) and Shinnosuke Motoyama (choreo)	Hideki Mitsui	Toshihiko Sahashi (music); Yuuuji Mitsuya (lyrics)	Sixth live concert.	
Final Match First	2009	Nippon Seinen-kan Hall (30 July-16 Aug); Osaka Mielparque Hall (19-26 Aug); Hiroshima Kōsei Nenkin Kaikan (29-30 Aug); Aichi Kinro Kaikan (4-6 Sep); Sendai Cultural Foundation Izumiti21 (19-21 Sep); Fukuoka Shimin Kaikan Dai-Hall (26-27 Sep); JCB Hall (1-4 Oct); 19 cinema viewings across Japan (4 Oct)	Yukio Ueshima (director/choreo) and Shinnosuke Motoyama (choreo)	Hideki Mitsui	Toshihiko Sahashi (music); Yuuuji Mitsuya (lyrics)	All matches, except singles one, against Rikkaidai during the National tournament.	
Final Match Second	2009–2010	Nippon Seinen-kan Hall (17-24 Dec); Osaka Mielparque Hall (27 Dec-11 Jan); Chukyo University Center for Culture & Arts (15-17 Jan); Ishikawa Kouseinenkin Kaikan (29-30 Jan); Hiroshima Kōsei Nenkin Kaikan (5-7 Feb); Fukuoka Sunpalace (12-13 Feb); Natori City Cultural Foundation (20-21 Feb); JCB Hall (26 Feb-14 March); 27 cinema viewings across Japan (14 March)	Yukio Ueshima (director/choreo) and Shinnosuke Motoyama (choreo)	Hideki Mitsui	Toshihiko Sahashi (music); Yuuuji Mitsuya (lyrics)	Singles one match between Ryoma Echizen and Seiichi Yukimura during the National tournament. Last story-line musical.	
Dream Live 7th	2010	Kobe World Memorial Hall (7–9 May); Yokohama Arena (20–23 May)	Yukio Ueshima (director/choreo) and Shinnosuke Motoyama (choreo)	Hideki Mitsui	Toshihiko Sahashi (music); Yuuuji Mitsuya (lyrics)	Seventh live concert.	

=== Cast ===
2003–2006
Character	Prince of Tennis	1st Match	Dream Live 1st	More Than Limit	Special Match	Side Yamabuki	Dream Live 2nd	Imperial Match
Character	2003	2003–2004	2004		2004–2005	2005		2005–2006
Ryoma Echizen	Kotaro Yanagi	Kimeru (Note: The original cast of Remarkable 1st Match Fudomine had Kotaro Yanagi and Kimeru playing their respective roles of Ryoma Echizen and Shusuke Fuji, and Takashi Nagayama permanently replacing Yamazaki Ichitaro as Eiji Kikumaru. Less than two weeks before the premiere, Yanagi was involved in a car accident and hospitalized. Kimeru took over as Echizen, Nagayama was shifted to Fuji, and Ichitaro was brought back as Kikumaru.)	Yuya Endo (Note: Yuya Endo debuted as the new Ryoma Echizen in Dream Live 1st, which also featured Fudomine's Shinji Ibu as a special guest.)	Yuya Endo	Kotaro Yanagi (acting) and Yuya Endo (choreography) (Note: Side Fudomine ~Special Match~ was a re-run of Remarkable 1st Match Fudomine with extra scenes, and the graduation show of the first Seigaku cast. During the run of this musical, Kotaro Yanagi returned and shared the role of Echizen with Yuya Endo, doing the acting scenes while Endo did the dance and tennis match choreographies.)	Yuya Endo	Yuya Endo and Kotaro Yanagi (Note: Dream Live 2nd was the graduation show of Yuya Endo. Kotaro Yanagi returned and again shared the role of Ryoma Echizen once more with Endo; he acted in only one stand still scene while Endo performed throughout the majority of the show. Guest starred members of Fudomine, St. Rudolph and Yamabuki.)	Kotaro Yanagi
Kunimitsu Tezuka	Eiji Takigawa	Eiji Takigawa	Eiji Takigawa	Kengo Ohkuchi (Note: More Than Limit featured Kengo Ohkuchi and Eiki Kitamura filling in for the roles of Tezuka and Kawamura, respectively.)	Eiji Takigawa	Yuu Shirota	Yuu Shirota	Yuu Shirota
Shuichiro Oishi	Yuichi Tsuchiya	Yuichi Tsuchiya	Yuichi Tsuchiya	Yuichi Tsuchiya	Yuichi Tsuchiya	Hiroki Suzuki	Hiroki Suzuki	Hiroki Suzuki
Shusuke Fuji	Kimeru	Takashi Nagayama	Kimeru	Kimeru	Kimeru	Hiroki Aiba	Hiroki Aiba	Hiroki Aiba
Eiji Kikumaru	Yamazaki Ichitaro (May); Takashi Nagayama (Aug)	Yamazaki Ichitaro	Takashi Nagayama	Takashi Nagayama	Takashi Nagayama	Osamu Adachi	Osamu Adachi	Osamu Adachi
Takashi Kawamura	Yoshitsugu Abe (May); Ryoji Morimoto (Aug)	Yoshitsugu Abe	Yoshitsugu Abe	Eiki Kitamura	Yoshitsugu Abe	Yoshikazu Kotani	Yoshikazu Kotani	Yoshikazu Kotani
Sadaharu Inui	Sota Aoyama	Sota Aoyama	Sota Aoyama	Sota Aoyama	Sota Aoyama	Hirofumi Araki	Hirofumi Araki	Hirofumi Araki
Takeshi Momoshiro	Eiji Moriyama	Eiji Moriyama	Eiji Moriyama	Eiji Moriyama	Eiji Moriyama	Masaki Kaji	Masaki Kaji	Masaki Kaji
Kaoru Kaidoh	Naoya Gomoto	Naoya Gomoto	Naoya Gomoto	Naoya Gomoto	Naoya Gomoto	Kousuke Kujirai	Kousuke Kujirai	Kousuke Kujirai
Satoshi Horio	Yusuke Ishibashi	Yusuke Ishibashi	Yusuke Ishibashi	Yusuke Ishibashi	Yusuke Ishibashi	Yusuke Ishibashi	Yusuke Ishibashi	Yusuke Ishibashi
Kachiro Kato	Toshiyuki Toyonaga	Toshiyuki Toyonaga	Toshiyuki Toyonaga	Toshiyuki Toyonaga	Toshiyuki Toyonaga	Toshiyuki Toyonaga	Toshiyuki Toyonaga	Toshiyuki Toyonaga
Katsuo Mizuno	Katsu Hotta	Katsu Hotta	Katsu Hotta	Katsu Hotta	Katsu Hotta	Katsu Hotta	Katsu Hotta	Katsu Hotta
Masashi Arai	Jiro Morikawa	-	-	-	-	-	-	-
Masaya Ikeda	Terumichi Kamai	-	-	-	-	-	-	-
Daisuke Hayashi	Masaki Nagauchi	-	-	-	-	-	-	-
Sasabe	Katsuo (May); Takeshi Matsumura (Aug)	-	-	-	-	-	-	-
Najiroh Echizen	Yukio Ueshima	Yukio Ueshima	Yukio Ueshima	-	Yukio Ueshima	-	Yukio Ueshima	-
Kippei Tachibana	-	Takuma Sugawara	-	-	YOH	-	YOH	-
Shinji Ibu	-	Ryōsei Konishi	Ryōsei Konishi	-	Ryōsei Konishi	-	-	-
Akira Kamio	-	Matsui Yasuyuki	-	-	Yuki Fujiwara	-	Yuki Fujiwara	-
Tetsu Ishida	-	Mamoru Miyano	-	-	Mamoru Miyano	-	Mamoru Miyano	Mamoru Miyano (winter only)
Masaya Sakurai	-	Shun Takagi	-	-	Shun Takagi	-	Shun Takagi	Shun Takagi (winter only)
Hajime Mizuki	-	-	-	Hidemasa Shiozawa	-	-	Hidemasa Shiozawa	Hidemasa Shiozawa
Yuuta Fuji	-	-	-	KENN	-	KENN	KENN	KENN
Yoshirou Akazawa	-	-	-	Kenji Aoki	-	Kenji Aoki	Kenji Aoki	Kenji Aoki (winter only)
Shinya Yanagisawa	-	-	-	Mitsuyoshi Shinoda	-	Mitsuyoshi Shinoda	-	Mitsuyoshi Shinoda
Atsushi Kisarazu	-	-	-	Ryosuke Kato	-	Ryosuke Kato	Ryosuke Kato	-
Ichirou Kaneda	-	-	-	Yuki Ohtake	-	Yuki Ohtake	Yuki Ohtake	-
Jin Akutsu	-	-	-	-	-	Juri	Juri	Juri
Taichi Dan	-	-	-	-	-	Yuki Kawakubo	Yuki Kawakubo	Yuki Kawakubo (fall only)
Kiyosumi Sengoku	-	-	-	-	-	Masato Wada	Masato Wada	Masato Wada
Kentarou Minami	-	-	-	-	-	Hiroshi Yazaki	Hiroshi Yazaki	-
Masami Higashikata	-	-	-	-	-	Iori Hayashi	Iori Hayashi	-
Muromachi Toji	-	-	-	-	-	Takahiko Yanagisawa	Takahiko Yanagisawa	-
Keigo Atobe	-	-	-	-	-	-	-	Kazuki Kato
Munehiro Kabaji	-	-	-	-	-	-	-	Ryo Washimi
Yuushi Oshitari	-	-	-	-	-	-	-	Takumi Saito
Gakuto Mukahi	-	-	-	-	-	-	-	Ruito Aoyagi
Ryoh Shishido	-	-	-	-	-	-	-	Kenta Kamakari
Ootori Chotaroh	-	-	-	-	-	-	-	Koji Date
Jirou Akutagawa	-	-	-	-	-	-	-	Takuya Konma
Wakashi Hiyoshi	-	-	-	-	-	-	-	Ryunosuke Kawai

Notes

2006–2008
Character	Dream Live 3rd	Advancement Match	1st Service	Dream Live 4	2nd Service	Progressive Match	Dream Live 5th
Character	2006		2006–2007	2007		2007–2008	2008
Ryoma Echizen	Kotaro Yanagi	Dori Sakurada	Dori Sakurada	Dori Sakurada	Dori Sakurada	Shōgo Sakamoto	Shōgo Sakamoto
Kunimitsu Tezuka	Yuu Shirota	Keisuke Minami	Keisuke Minami	Keisuke Minami	Keisuke Minami	Daisuke Watanabe	Daisuke Watanabe
Shuichiro Oishi	Hiroki Suzuki	Yukihiro Takiguchi	Yukihiro Takiguchi	Yukihiro Takiguchi	Yukihiro Takiguchi	Yuya Toyoda	Yuya Toyoda
Shusuke Fuji	Hiroki Aiba	Hiroki Aiba	Hiroki Aiba	Hiroki Aiba	Hiroki Aiba	Yuuta Furukawa	Yuuta Furukawa
Eiji Kikumaru	Osamu Adachi	Kōji Seto	Kōji Seto	Kōji Seto	Kōji Seto	Kyousuke Hamao	Kyousuke Hamao
Takashi Kawamura	Yoshikazu Kotani	Kouji Watanabe	Kouji Watanabe	Kouji Watanabe	Kouji Watanabe	Hiroaki Ogasawara	Hiroaki Ogasawara
Sadaharu Inui	Hirofumi Araki	Masei Nakayama	Masei Nakayama	Masei Nakayama	Masei Nakayama	Yuuta Takahashi	Yuuta Takahashi
Takeshi Momoshiro	Masaki Kaji	Shinpei Takagi	Shinpei Takagi	Shinpei Takagi	Shinpei Takagi	Tetsuya Makita	Tetsuya Makita
Kaoru Kaidoh	Kousuke Kujirai (Note: Debut performance of the 3rd Seigaku cast. The original cast of this show had Takahiro Tasaki in the role of Kaoru Kaidoh, but due to Tasaki's withdrawal from the show, Kousuke Kujirai (who had graduated) was brought back to the musical as his replacement. Guest starring all members of Hyotei Gakuen.)	Kousuke Kujirai	Tomo Yanagishita	Tomo Yanagishita	Tomo Yanagishita	Yuuichirou Hirata and Tomo Yanagishita (Note: Yanagishita and Hirata again took turns playing Kaidoh for different performances of Dream Live 5th. Also the graduation show for Tomo Yanagishita.)	Yuuichirou Hirata and Tomo Yanagishita
Satoshi Horio	Yusuke Ishibashi	Masaki Hara	Masaki Hara	Masaki Hara	Masaki Hara	-	-
Kachiro Kato	Toshiyuki Toyonaga	Yuya Mori	Ryou Kawamoto	Ryou Kawamoto	Ryou Kawamoto	-	-
Katsuo Mizuno	Katsu Hotta	Yuki Okamoto	Kouichi Eguchi	Kouichi Eguchi	Kouichi Eguchi	-	-
Nanjiroh Echizen	Yukio Ueshima	-	-	Yukio Ueshima	-	-	Yukio Ueshima
Keigo Atobe	Kazuki Kato	Kazuki Kato	-	Kazuki Kato	-	-	-
Munehiro Kabaji	Ryo Washimi	Ryo Washimi	-	Ryo Washimi	-	-	Ryo Washimi
Yuushi Oshitari	Takumi Saito	Takumi Saito	-	Takumi Saito	-	-	Takumi Saito
Gakuto Mukahi	Ruito Aoyagi	Ruito Aoyagi	-	Ruito Aoyagi	-	-	-
Ryoh Shishido	Kenta Kamakari	Kenta Kamakari	-	Kenta Kamakari and Ryunosuke Kawai (Osaka only) (Note: Initially, in Dream Live 4th, Kenta Kamakari, who played Hyotei's Ryoh Shishido, was set to appear in Osaka, but as Kamakari was hospitalized and pulled out of the musical, Ryunosuke Kawai as Hiyoshi stepped in. Performances in Osaka featured all members of Seigaku, Rikkai Daigaku Fuzoku and Rokkaku Chuu and had guest starring Yamabuki Chuu's Kiyosumi Sengoku and Kentarou Minami, as well as Hyotei Gakuen's Gakuto Mukahi and Wakashi Hiyoshi.)	-	-	-
Ootori Chotaroh	Koji Date	Koji Date	-	Koji Date	-	-	-
Jirou Akutagawa	Takuya Konma	Takuya Konma	-	Takuya Konma	-	-	-
Wakashi Hiyoshi	Ryunosuke Kawai	Ryunosuke Kawai	-	Ryunosuke Kawai	-	-	-
Aoi Kentaro	-	Kazuma Kawahara	Kazuma Kawahara	Kazuma Kawahara	Kazuma Kawahara	-	Kazuma Kawahara
Kojirou Saeki	-	Kanata Irei	Kanata Irei	Kanata Irei	-	Kanata Irei	Kanata Irei
Ryoh Kisarazu	-	Ryosuke Kato	-	Ryosuke Kato	-	Ryosuke Kato	
Hikaru Amane	-	Airu Shiozaki	Airu Shiozaki	Airu Shiozaki	Airu Shiozaki	-	-
Harukaze Kurobane	-	Shindo Gaku	Shindo Gaku	Shindo Gaku	Shindo Gaku	-	-
Marehiko Itsuki	-	Shoma Ikegami	Shoma Ikegami	Shoma Ikegami	Shoma Ikegami	-	Shoma Ikegami
Seiichi Yukimura	-	-	Ren Yagami	Ren Yagami	Ren Yagami	Ren Yagami	Ren Yagami
Genichirou Sanada	-	-	Kentarou Kanesaki	Kentarou Kanesaki	Kentarou Kanesaki	Kentarou Kanesaki	Kentarou Kanesaki
Renji Yanagi	-	-	-	Kento Ono	Kento Ono	Kento Ono	Kento Ono
Masaharu Niou	-	-	Masataka Nakagauchi	Masataka Nakagauchi	Masataka Nakagauchi	Masataka Nakagauchi	Masataka Nakagauchi
Hiroshi Yagyuu	-	-	Toru Baba	Toru Baba	Toru Baba	Toru Baba	Toru Baba
Akaya Kirihara	-	-	Genki Okawa	Genki Okawa	Genki Okawa	Genki Okawa	Genki Okawa
Bunta Marui	-	-	Renn Kiriyama	Renn Kiriyama	Renn Kiriyama	-	Renn Kiriyama
Jackal Kuwahara	-	-	Jutta Yuuki	Jutta Yuuki	Jutta Yuuki	Jutta Yuuki	Jutta Yuuki
Kippei Tachibana	-	-	-	YOH	-	-	-
Akira Kamio	-	-	-	Yuki Fujiwara	-	-	-
Tetsu Ishida	-	-	-	Mamoru Miyano	-	-	Mamoru Miyano
Masaya Sakurai	-	-	-	Shun Takagi	-	-	-
Yoshirou Akazawa	-	-	-	Kenji Aoki	-	-	-
Shinya Yanagisawa	-	-	-	Mitsuyoshi Shinoda	-	-	-
Atsushi Kisarazu	-	-	-	Ryosuke Kato	-	-	-
Ichirou Kaneda	-	-	-	Yuki Ohtake	-	-	-
Taichi Dan	-	-	-	Yuki Kawakubo	-	-	-
Kiyosumi Sengoku	-	-	-	Masato Wada	-	-	-
Kentarou Minami	-	-	-	Hiroshi Yazaki	-	-	-
Masami Higashikata	-	-	-	Iori Hayashi	-	-	-
Muromachi Toji	-	-	-	Takahiko Yanagisawa	-	-	-
Eishirou Kite	-	-	-	-	Luke.C	Luke.C	Luke.C
Hiroshi Chinen	-	-	-	-	Takeshi Hayashino	Takeshi Hayashino	Takeshi Hayashino
Yuujirou Kai	-	-	-	-	-	Hijiri Shinotani and Imai Tsunemitsu (Note: In The Progressive Match Higa Chuu, Tomo Yanagishita (who had stayed as an alternate), and Yuuichirou Hirata (who was cast as the new Kaidoh) took turns playing the role of Kaidoh for different performances. Hijiri Shinotani had been replaced by Imai Tsunemitsu because he was sick – (Double Yuujirou).)	Hijiri Shinotani
Rin Hirakoba	-	-	-	-	-	Yasuka Saito	Yasuka Saito
Kei Tanishi	-	-	-	-	-	Yutaka Matsuzaki	Yutaka Matsuzaki
Jin Akutsu	-	-	-	-	-	-	Juri
Ichiro Kaneda	-	-	-	-	-	-	Yuki Ohtake

Notes

2008–2010
Character	Imperial Presence	Treasure Match	Dream Live 6th	Final Match First	Final Match Second	Dream Live 7th
Character	2008	2008–2009	2009		2009–2010	2010
Ryoma Echizen	Shōgo Sakamoto (4th cast); Ryuki Takahashi (5th cast) (Note: The Imperial Presence Hyotei was the debut of the fifth Seigaku cast. Hiroki Aiba returned temporarily as Shusuke Fuji. Guest starring Higa Chuu. It's the first musical in the series to be performed overseas, with shows in Taiwan and South-Korea. Also the first musical with Double cast. Both casts took turns performing the musical for different performances. Kazuki Kato and Takumi Saito returned for the October performances on request of the fans. For several reasons Kei Hosogai took over for Ryunosuke Kawai as Wakashi Hiyoshi during the performances in Hiroshima, Fukuoka en Niigata and played the role alongside Hyoutei A. Li Yong En portrayed the role of Chotaroh Ootori during all performances in Taiwan.) (Note: The Treasure Match Shitenhouji was the debut of Hashimoto Taito as fifth cast's Shusuke Fuji. The shows between 13 December and 25 January were performed by Seigaku 4th, Shitenhouji A, Yuki Kubota as Hyoutei's Keigo Atobe and Shintaro Akiyama as Hyoutei's Yuushi Oshitari + another Hyoutei member and Akutsu (A) or Tachibana (A). The shows between February 6 and March 31 were performed by Seigaku 5th, Shitenhouji B, Yuki Kubota as Hyoutei's Keigo Atobe, Ryouta Murai as Hyoutei's Shishido Ryoh + another Hyoutei member and Akutsu (B) or Tachibana (B).)			Ryuki Takahashi	Ryuki Takahashi	Kotaro Yanagi (1st cast) (Note: Dream Live 7th was the last performance of the first season. The 1st Seigaku cast made a brief return during the Live. Every show featured special guests (former actors in the play). Also the Graduation show of the 5th Seigaku cast) and Ryuki Takahashi (5th cast)
Kunimitsu Tezuka	Daisuke Watanabe (4th cast); Ryoma Baba (5th cast)			Ryoma Baba	Ryoma Baba	Eiji Takigawa (1st cast) and Ryoma Baba (5th cast)
Shuichiro Oishi	Yuya Toyoda (4th cast); Yuki Tsujimoto (5th cast)			Yuki Tsujimoto	Yuki Tsujimoto	Tsuchiya Yuichi (1st cast) and Yuki Tsujimoto (5th cast)
Shusuke Fuji	Yuuta Furukawa (4th cast); Hiroki Aiba (5th cast)	Yuuta Furukawa (4th cast); Hashimoto Taito (5th cast)		Hashimoto Taito	Hashimoto Taito	Kimeru (1st cast) and Hashimoto Taito (5th cast)
Eiji Kikumaru	Kyousuke Hamao (4th cast); Shouta Takazaki (5th cast)			Shouta Takazaki	Shouta Takazaki	Takashi Nagayama (1st cast) and Shouta Takazaki (5th cast)
Sadaharu Inui	Yuuta Takahashi (4th cast); Yusuke Arai (5th cast)			Yusuke Arai	Yusuke Arai	Sota Aoyama (1st cast) and Yusuke Arai
Takeshi Momoshiro	Tetsuya Makita (4th cast); Toshihiro Nobuyama (5th cast)			Toshihiro Nobuyama	Toshihiro Nobuyama	Eiji Moriyama (1st cast); Toshihiro Nobuyama (5th cast)
Kaoru Kaidoh	Yuuichirou Hirata (4th cast); Akihiro Hayashi (5th cast)			Akihiro Hayashi	Akihiro Hayashi	Naoya Gomoto (1st cast) and Akihiro Hayashi
Takashi Kawamura	Teyu Kon (4th cast); Ikko Chou (5th cast)			Ikko Chou	Ikko Chou	Eiki Kitamura (1st cast); Ikko Chou (5th cast)
Satoshi Horio	Ryo Yamada (4th cast); Shun Maruyama (5th cast)			Shun Maruyama	Shun Maruyama	Shun Maruyama
Kachiro Kato	Tsubasa Itou (4th cast); Hiroki Hirai (5th cast)			Hiroki Hirai	Hiroki Hirai	Hiroki Hirai
Katsuo Mizuno	Kouichi Eguchi (4th cast); Masashi Watanabe (5th cast)	Kouichi Eguchi (4th cast); Rie Takahashi (5th cast)		Rie Takahashi	Rie Takahashi	Rie Takahashi
Nanjiroh Echizen	-	-	Yukio Ueshima (Group B)	-	Yukio Ueshima and Shinnosuke Motoyama	Yukio Ueshima and Shinnosuke Motoyama
Keigo Atobe	Yuki Kubota (Group A); Masahiro Inoue (Group B); Kazuki Kato (Oct only)	-	Yuki Kubota	Yuki Kubota	Yuki Kubota	Yuki Kubota
Munehiro Kabaji	Ryo Washimi (Group A); Jouji Kawada (Group B)	Joji Kawada	-	-	-	-
Yuushi Oshitari	Shintarou Akiyama; Takumi Saito (Oct only)	Shintarou Akiyama	-	-	-	-
Gakuto Mukahi	Ruito Aoyagi (Group A); Seiji Fukuyama (Group B)	Seiji Fukuyama	-	-	-	-
Ryoh Shishido	Kenta Kamakari (Group A); Ryouta Murai (Group B)	Ryota Murai	-	-	-	-
Ootori Chotaroh	Seto Yuusuke (Group A); Li Yong En (Group B; Taiwan only)	Seto Yuusuke	-	-	-	-
Jirou Akutagawa	Takuya Konma (Group A); Taiki Naitou (Group B)	Taiki Naitou	-	-	-	-
Wakashi Hiyoshi	Ryunosuke Kawai (Group A); Kei Hosogai (Group B; select performances)	Kei Hosogai	-	-	Kei Hosogai	Kei Hosogai
Yuujirou Kai	Hijiri Shinotani	-	-	-	-	-
Eishirou Kite	Luke.C	-	Luke.C	-	-	-
Hiroshi Chinen	Takeshi Hayashino	-	Takeshi Hayashino	-	-	-
Rin Hirakoba	Yasuka Saito	-	-	-	-	-
Kei Tanishi	Yutaka Matsuzaki	-	Yutaka Matsuzaki	-	Yutaka Matsuzaki	-
Kuranosuke Shiraishi	-	Harukawa Kyousuke (Group A); Yoshihide Sasaki (Group B)	Harukawa Kyousuke (Group A); Yoshihide Sasaki (Group B)	Harukawa Kyousuke (Group A); Yoshihide Sasaki (Group B)	Harukawa Kyousuke (Group A); Yoshihide Sasaki (Group B)	Harukawa Kyousuke (Group A); Yoshihide Sasaki (Group B)
Kintarō Tooyama	-	Kido Yuuya (Group A); Takuya Kawaharada (Group B)	Kido Yuuya (Group A); Takuya Kawaharada (Group B)	Kido Yuuya (Group A); Takuya Kawaharada (Group B)	Kido Yuuya (Group A); Takuya Kawaharada (Group B)	
Senri Chitose	-	Ryuuko Isogai (Group A); Masashi Ooyama (Group B)	Ryuuko Isogai (Group A); Masashi Ooyama (Group B)	Ryuuko Isogai (Group A); Masashi Ooyama (Group B)	-	
Kenya Oshitari	-	Uehara Takuya (Group A); Kouki Mizuta (Group B)	Uehara Takuya (Group A); Kouki Mizuta (Group B)	Uehara Takuya (Group A); Kouki Mizuta (Group B)	-	Kouki Mizuta (Group B)
Hikaru Zaizen	-	Hisanori Satou (Group A); Bishin Kawasumi (Group B)	Hisanori Satou (Note: Dream Live 6th featured both Seigaku casts, guest starring members Hyoutei, Shitenhouji, Higa Chuu, Rikkaidai, Yamabuki and Fudomine. Bishin Kawasumi didn't return and Hisanori Satou performed the role of Zaizen with Shitenhouji A and B. Also the graduation show for the fourth generation Seigaku cast.)	Hisanori Satou	-	Hisanori Satou (Group A)
Gin Ishida	-	Yuusuke Hirose (Group A); Yuuta Yoneyama (Group B)	Yuusuke Hirose (Group A); Yuuta Yoneyama (Group B)	Yuusuke Hirose (Group A); Yuuta Yoneyama (Group B)	-	Yuusuke Hirose (Group A); Yuuta Yoneyama (Group B)
Koharu Konjiki	-	Takeya Nishiyama (Group A); Manabu Iizumi (Group B)	Takeya Nishiyama (Group A); Manabu Iizumi (Group B)	Takeya Nishiyama (Group A); Manabu Iizumi (Group B)	-	Takeya Nishiyama (Group A); Manabu Iizumi (Group B)
Yuuji Hitōji	-	Ryo Hirano (Group A); Makoto Uenobori (Group B)	Ryo Hirano (Group A); Makoto Uenobori (Group B)	Ryo Hirano (Group A); Makoto Uenobori (Group B)	-	Ryo Hirano (Group A); Makoto Uenobori (Group B)
Kippei Tachibana	-	Takashi Kitadai (Group A); YOH (Group B)	Takashi Kitadai	-	-	-
Jin Akutsu	-	Juri (Group A); Ryotaro Shimizu (Group B)	Ryotaro Shimizu	-	Juri and Ryotaro Shimizu	Juri and Ryotaro Shimizu
Shinji Ibu	-	-	-	-	Oota Motohiro	Oota Motohiro
Yuuta Fuji	-	-	-	-	KENN	KENN
Genichirou Sanada	-	-	Kentarou Kanesaki	Kentarou Kanesaki	Kentarou Kanesaki	Kentarou Kanesaki
Seiichi Yukimura	-	-	-	Toshiki Masuda	Toshiki Masuda	Toshiki Masuda
Renji Yanagi	-	-	Yuuki Yamaoki	Yuuki Yamaoki	Yuuki Yamaoki	Yuuki Yamaoki
Hiroshi Yagyuu	-	-	-	Toru Baba; Onoda Ryuunosuke (support)	Toru Baba; Onoda Ryuunosuke (support)	Toru Baba; Onoda Ryuunosuke (support)
Masaharu Niou	-	-	-	Masataka Nakagauchi; Taisuke Wada (support)	Masataka Nakagauchi; Taisuke Wada (support)	Masataka Nakagauchi; Taisuke Wada (support)
Akaya Kirihara	-	-	-	Genki Okawa; Mitsuaki Nishimura (support)	Genki Okawa; Mitsuaki Nishimura (support)	Genki Okawa; Mitsuaki Nishimura (support)
Bunta Marui	-	-	-	Mio Akaba	Mio Akaba	Mio Akaba
Jackal Kuwahara	-	-	-	Shingo Toda	Shingo Toda	Shingo Toda
Hikaru Amane	-	-	-	-	-	Airu Shiozaki
Ryou Kisarazu	-	-	-	-	-	Ryosuke Kato
Kei Tanishi	-	-	-	-	-	Yutaka Matsuzaki

== Second season ==
=== Locations ===
Musical	Year	Location/date	Adaption/production	Choreography	Screenplay	Music	Supervisor	Notes	Ref
Seigaku VS Fudomine	2011	JCB Hall (5-16 Jan); Osaka Mielparque Hall (19-23 Jan); Nippon Seinenkan (26 Jan-11 Feb)	Yoshiko Iseki	Shinnosuke Motoyama	Hideki Mitsui	Toshihiko Sahashi (music); Yuuji Mitsuya (lyrics)	Yukio Ueshima	Echizen's arrival at Seigaku until the end of the matches against Fudomine.	
Seigaku VS St. Rudolph and Yamabuki	2011	Tokyo Dome City Hall (31 March-17 April and 8–15 May); Osaka Mielparque Hall (27 April-3 May)	Yoshiko Iseki	Shinnosuke Motoyama	Hideki Mitsui	Toshihiko Sahashi (music); Yuuji Mitsuya (lyrics)	Yukio Ueshima	Matches between Seigaku and rival schools St. Rudolph and Yamabuki. All performances between 31 March and 7 April were cancelled, due to the Tōhoku earthquake and tsunami that hit Japan on 11 March.	
Seigaku VS Hyoutei	2011	Tokyo Dome City Hall (15–31 July and 22-24 Sep); Osaka Mielparque Hall (10-21 Aug); Chukyo University Center for Culture & Arts (31 Aug-4 Sep; Canal City Fukuoka (8-11 Sep)	Yoshiko Iseki	Shinnosuke Motoyama	Hideki Mitsui	Toshihiko Sahashi (music); Yuuji Mitsuya (lyrics)	Yukio Ueshima	Matches between Seigaku and rival school Hyoutei.	

=== Cast ===
2011
Character	Seigaku VS Fudomin	Seigaku VS St. Rudolph and Yamabuki	Seigaku VS Hyoutei
Character	2011		
Ryoma Echizen	Yuuki Ogoe	Yuuki Ogoe	Yuuki Ogoe
Kunimitsu Tezuka	Takuma Wada	Takuma Wada	Takuma Wada
Shuichiro Oishi	Jin Hiramaki	Jin Hiramaki	Jin Hiramaki
Shusuke Fuji	Ryou Mitsuya	Ryou Mitsuya	Ryou Mitsuya
Eiji Kikumaru	Yuta Koseki	Yuta Koseki	Yuta Koseki
Sadaharu Inui	Teruma	Teruma	Teruma
Takashi Kawamura	Tomohiro Tsurumi	Tomohiro Tsurumi	Tomohiro Tsurumi
Takeshi Momoshiro	Toru Kamitsuru	Toru Kamitsuru	Toru Kamitsuru
Kaoru Kaidoh	Ryousuke Ikeoka	Ryousuke Ikeoka	Ryousuke Ikeoka
Satoshi Horio	Kento Masui	Kento Masui	Kento Masui
Kachiro Kato	Shunya Oohira	Shunya Oohira	Shunya Oohira
Katsuo Mizuno	Mizuki Oono	Mizuki Oono	Mizuki Oono
Nanjiroh Echizen	Shinnosuke Motoyama	Shinnosuke Motoyama	Shinnosuke Motoyama
Kippei Tachibana	Yuusuke Ueda	-	-
Shinji Ibu	Kazuhiro Okazaki	-	-
Akira Kamio	Kinari Hirano	-	Kinari Hirano
Tetsu Ishida	Kyoushirou Takagi	-	-
Kyosuke Uchimura	Mao Kato	-	Mao Kato (Note: Mao Kato & Youichiro Omi, Sho Jin'nai & Daisuke Hirose, Joji Saotome & Takeshi Terayama appeared as daily guests in Seigaku VS Hyoutei.)
Tatsunori Mori	Youichiro Omi	-	Youichiro Omi
Masaya Sakurai	Fumiya Takahashi	-	-
Hajime Mizuki	-	Yutaka Kobayashi	-
Yuuta Fuji	-	Seiya Konishi	Seiya Konishi
Yoshirou Akazawa	-	Kenta Iduka	-
Shinya Yanagisawa	-	Sho Jin'nai	Sho Jin'nai
Atsushi Kisarazu	-	Daisuke Hirose	Daisuke Hirose
Ichirou Kaneda	-	Shotaro Ookubo	-
Jin Akutsu	-	Takuya Kishimoto	-
Taichi Dan	-	Reiya Masaki}	-
Kiyosumi Sengoku	-	Seiya	-
Kentarou Minami	-	Joji Saotome	-
Masami Higashikata	-	Takeshi Terayama	-
Muromachi Toji	-	Kensho Ono	-
Keigo Atobe	-	-	Tsunenori Aoki
Yuushi Oshitari	-	-	Takuya Kikuchi
Gakuto Mukahi	-	-	Jun Shison
Ryou Shishido	-	-	Kousuke Kuwano
Jirou Akutagawa	-	-	Tomoru Akazawa
Munehiro Kabaji	-	-	Hiroyuki Furuie
Haginosuke Taki	-	-	Kento Nishijima
Choutarou Ootori	-	-	Jin Shirasu
Wakashi Hiyoshi	-	-	Daiki Ise
Kiyosumi Sengoku	-	-	Seiya
Kentarou Minami	-	-	Joji Saotome
Masami Higashikata	-	-	Takeshi Terayama

== See also ==
- The Prince of Tennis Musical Music List
