= Shinji Takeda =

Japanese actor and musician

- 武田 真治
- Born: December 18, 1972 (age 53); Sapporo, Hokkaido, Japan
- Occupations: Actor talent saxophone player
- Years active: 1990–present
- Agent: Horipro
- Notable credit(s): The Incite Mill; Kyō Kara Hitman; Tokyo Eyes
- Spouse: Manami Shizuka (m. 2020)

Shinji Takeda (武田 真治, Takeda Shinji), born December 18, 1972, is a Japanese actor, talent, and saxophone player. He has had notable roles in such works as The Incite Mill, Kyō Kara Hitman, and Tokyo Eyes.

== Filmography ==
=== Television drama ===
Year	Title	Role	Notes	Ref.
1992–1993	Night Head	Naoya Kirihara		
1994	Wakamono no subete	Keisuke		
1994	Minami-kun no Koibito	Hiroyuki Minami	Lead role	
2011	Gō	Ōno Harunaga	Taiga drama	
2021	Reach Beyond the Blue Sky	Oguri Tadamasa	Taiga drama	
2024	Superstar Minami Is My Boyfriend!?	Shintaro Horikiri		

=== Other television ===
Year	Title	Notes	Ref.
1996–2018	Mecha-Mecha Iketeru!	Variety show	

=== Film ===
Year	Title	Role	Notes	Ref.
1992	Shichi-nin no otaku: Cult seven	Haruo		
1998	Tokyo Eyes	K	Lead role; French-Japanese film	
1999	Gohatto	Lieutenant Soji Okita		
1999	Barren Illusions	Haru	Lead role	
2009	Kyō Kara Hitman	Tokichi Inaba	Lead role	
2010	The Incite Mill	Sousuke Iwai		
2019	Diner	Blow		
2027	10 Things I Want to Do Before I Turn 40: The Movie	Satoshi Hanamura		

=== Dubbing ===
- Rambo: Last Blood, Hugo Martinez (Sergio Peris-Mencheta)

== Awards and nominations ==
Year	Award	Category	Work(s)	Result	Ref.
1999	42nd Blue Ribbon Awards	Best Supporting Actor	Gohatto	Won	
2000	23rd Japan Academy Film Prize	Best Supporting Actor	Gohatto	Nominated	
