= Takashi Nagayama =

Japanese actor

Takashi Nagayama (永山たかし, Nagayama Takashi; real name 永山 毅 Nagayama Takashi, born November 16, 1978, in Kanagawa Prefecture, Japan) is a Japanese actor. He is probably best known for his roles as Eiji Kikumaru in The Prince of Tennis musical series, Tenimyu, and Tōshirō Hitsugaya in "Rock Musical Bleach". During his run in Tenimyu, he garnered the nickname "Nagayan", which he is still referred to by fans and friends. He made his television debut in 1998 with the drama Change.

== Career ==
=== The Prince of Tennis Musicals ===
Nagayama's major stage debut was from 2003 to the beginning of 2005 for the role of the acrobatic Eiji Kikumaru in the Prince of Tennis musical series, Tenimyu, as part of the first generation Seigaku cast. When the series came out in 2003, former D-BOYS member Yamazaki Ichitaro played the role during the spring run of the first show, and Nagayama played the role during the summer run. Afterwards, Nagayama was set to carry on playing the role with the first cast, understudying the role of Shusuke Fuji as well.

Less than two weeks before the second show, Remarkable 1st Match Fudomine, was to debut, the lead actor for Ryoma Echizen, Kotaro Yanagi, was hospitalized after being accidentally hit by a car. Because the musical's rehearsals were well underway and performance dates already set, several changes were made in the cast for the show: J-pop singer Kimeru, who was playing the role of Fuji, had to step up as Echizen, which resulted in Nagayama shifting over to Fuji, and Ichitaro was brought back as Kikumaru. After Yuya Endo was brought in as the new Echizen, Nagayama and Kimeru went back to their roles as Kikumaru and Fuji respectively. Nagayama graduated from the series with his fellow castmates after the Side Fudomine musical; along with several graduated Tenimyu members, he got a cameo role in the Prince of Tennis live film adaptation.

Since Nagayama's graduation, the role of Kikumaru has been played by Osamu Adachi, Koji Seto, Kyousuke Hamao, Shouta Takasaki, and Yuta Koseki. Nagayama, along with Kimeru and Endo, went to see Yanagi graduate from Tenimyu at the final performance of Dream Live 3rd in 2006.

Nagayama returned to his role as Kikumaru and reunited with the 1st generation Seigaku cast to perform in Tenimyu's Dream Live 7th in 2010 to celebrate the end of the Tenimyu's first season.

=== Other work ===
After his graduation, Nagayama also starred as Tōshirō Hitsugaya in the Rock Musical Bleach series, which also stars some of his old Tenimyu cast mates.

He enjoyed his first starring role in a theatrical production with Switch wo Osu Toki, in July 2006. His line of designer clothing, Blossam, can be found at the Gain shop in Tokyo. Nagayama has released several idol DVDs - Blossam in 2004, and two DVD/Photobook sets in 2007, entitled On and Off - as well as a single and two full-length albums. Since its formation in 2004, he has been very active with his Japanese fan club, and holds several members-only events each year. He maintains an active and popular blog, which he updates several times each week with photos. In his spare time, he enjoys sports, especially baseball, swimming, and karate, and remaking/designing clothing. Above all, Nagayama is earnest and serious about his work and his fans, and this has helped him build and maintain a loyal base of support worldwide.

== Profile ==
- Name: 永山たかし
- Name (romaji): Nagayama Takashi
- Real Name: 永山毅 (Nagayama Takashi)
- Date of birth: 1978 November 16
- Birthplace: Kanagawa Prefecture, Japan

== Musical ==
TENIMYU: THE PRINCE OF TENNIS MUSICAL SERIES (as Eiji Kikumaru, Fuji u/s)

- The Prince of Tennis Musical - Eiji Kikumaru (summer of 2003)
- The Prince of Tennis Musical: Remarkable 1st Match Fudomine - Shusuke Fuji (In Winter 2003-2004)
- The Prince of Tennis Musical: Dream Live 1st - Eiji Kikumaru (2004)
- The Prince of Tennis Musical: More Than Limit St. Rudolph Gakuen - Eiji Kikumaru (2004)
- The Prince of Tennis Musical: Side Fudomine ~Special Match~ - Eiji Kikumaru (In Winter 2004-2005)
- The Prince of Tennis Musical: Dream Live 7th - Eiji Kikumaru (2010)

Rock Musical BLEACH (as Tōshirō Hitsugaya)

- Rock Musical BLEACH (2005)
- Rock Musical BLEACH Saien (2006)
- Rock Musical BLEACH The Dark of The Bleeding Moon (2006)
- Rock Musical BLEACH Live Bankai Show Code: 001 (2007)
- Rock Musical BLEACH No Clouds in the Blue Heavens (2007)
- Rock Musical BLEACH Live Bankai Show Code: 002 (2008)
- Rock Musical BLEACH The All (2008)
- Rock Musical BLEACH Live Bankai Show Code: 003 (2010)

Other musicals

- Rock'n Jam Musical (2004)
- Rock'n Jam Musical - Saien (2005)
- Flowers for Algernon Musical (2006)
- Rock'n Jam Musical II (2006)
- Rock'n Jam Musical II - Saien (2007)
- Rock'n Jam Live - Live (2007)

== TV series ==
- Change (ANB, 1998) as Jiro Yoneyama
- Newscaster Kasumi Ryoko (ANB, 1999)
- Abunai Houkago (ANB, 1999, Episode 2)
- Norowareta Kagai Jugyou (KTV, 1999)
- Kowai Douwa: Cinderella (TBS, 1999)
- Shoushimin Kane (CX, 1999)
- Another Heaven Eclipse (ANB, 2000, Episodes 6-8)
- Gekka no Kishi (ANB, 2000) as Nishimura
- Hanamura Daisuke (KTV, 2000, Episode 9)
- Wakareru Futari no Jikenbo (ANB, 2000, Episode 7)
- Seigi no Shichiya Momonori: Tomoko no Jikenbo (CX, 2000)
- Koko Dake no Hanashi: Haigo no Onna (ANB, 2001)
- G-Taste: Kyoushi Mizukoshi Sayaka (ANB, 2001)
- Shin Omizu no Hanamichi (CX, 2001)
- Love & Fight (TBS, 2001)
- Morning Musume New Spring Love Stories: Toki o Kakeru (TBS, 2002) as Goro Asakura
- Yo ni mo Kimyou na Monogatari ’02 Haru Tokubetsu hen Mushi Geimu (CX, 2002)
- Kamen Rider Ryuki (ANB, 2002, Episodes 22-23) as Yuichi Saito
- Kaiki File 2: Senrozoi no Apartment (YTV, 2002)
- Hot Man (TBS, 2003, Episodes 4-6) as Yoshimasa Tsukamoto
- Team4 (CX, 2003)
- Hikeshiya Komachi (NHK, 2004)
- Fantasm: Noroi no Yado (NHK, 2004)
- Chi Ato (TBS, 2004)
- Chushingura (ANB, 2004, Episode 1)
- Ōoku: Dai Isshou (CX, 2004, Episodes 7, 9 and Special)
- Otōto (ANB, 2004)
- F2-X (CX, 2004)
- Yasashii Jikan (CX, 2005, Episode 6)
- Astro Kyuudan (TV ASAHI, 2005) as Akechi Kyushichi "Astro 7"
- Nihon no Rekishi (CX, 2005) as Ranmaru Mori
- Ōoku: Dai Isshou Special (CX, 2005)
- Shichinin no Onna Bengoshi (TV ASAHI, 2006, Episode 8)
- Kekkon Dekinai Otoko (KTV, 2006, Episode 11)
- Delicious Gakuin (TV TOKYO, 2007) as Okita Tsukasa
- Ururun (TBS, 2007)
- Sunshine Days (Kanagawa TV, 2007)
- Tadashii Ouji no Tsukuri Kata (TV TOKYO, 2008) as Nanbara Takashi
- Koi no Paradora (2008, Episode 8)
- Dageki Tenshi Ruri (2008, Episode 3)
- Shibatora (CX, 2009, Special)
- Arienai! (MBS, 2010, Episode 8)
- Tumbling (TBS, 2010, Episode 6) as Shinichi Hino

== Movies ==
- Usagi (1998)
- Tennen Shōjo Mahn Next (1999) - Yuuya Narugi
- Muscle Heat (2002) - Kazu
- Yume Oikakete (2003)
- Norio no Heya (2004)
- Touch (2005)
- Parazoku: Parapara ja nai ka! (2006)
- The Prince of Tennis (2006)
- Sakugoe (2007)
- Bokura no Hōteishiki (2008)
- Hana Guerilla (2009)
- Nude (2010)
- Dark Side of the Light (2016)

== Plays ==
- Oni to Hito to (2000)
- Mother Courage and Her Children (2005)
- Watashi wa Obasan ni Natte ‘ru !? (2006)
- Funny Bunny (2007)
- Switch o Osu Toki: Kimi wa Naze Ikiteiru ‘n da? (2006 & 2007) as Youhei Minami
- Aru Hi, Bokura wa Yume no Naka de Deau (2007)
- Jisoku 246 (2008)
- Kuchuu Blanco (2008)
- Every Little Thing (2008)
- Hakase to Tarō no Ijō na Aijō (2008)
- Shatō (2008)
- Tokubetsuhō Dai 001 jō DUST (2009) as Akihiro
- Maharaja Mode (2009) as Pasuputa
- Magdala na Maria 2 (2009)
- Shinsengumi (2010) as Toshiki Hijikata
- Blood Prisoner (2010)
- Shounen Hollywood (2011)
- Michi wo Kakeru (2011)

== Music ==
- Kokoro ga (2005)

1. 心が… (My Heart...) 2. おくるうた (A Song for You) 3. 雨音 (The Sound of the Rain) 4. 心が…(Toscana version) (My Heart...)

- JAM (2005):

1.春に思い出し想う (I'll Be Thinking Of You In the Spring) 2.おくるうた (A Song for You) 3.言葉～ (One Word) 4.Sample 5.おもいでにデキなくて (I Can't Make You Into a Memory) 6.南口 (Southern Exit) 7.心が…(Romano version) (My Heart...) 8.雨音 (The Sound of the Rain) 9.Slow Jam 10.終着駅 (Terminal Station) 11. JAM/Bonus Track

- LOVE (2006):

1.バーガーショップ (Burger Shop) 2.僕の中 (Inside Of Me) 3.恋・愛 (Passion - Love) 4.恋の痛み (The Pain of Love) 5.kiss°C (Temperature of a Kiss) 6.去りしきみ (The You That's Gone) 7.あかり (Light) 8.叫べ！ (Shout!) 9.唇 (Lips) 10.かたち (Shape) 11.LOVE/Bonus Track

- I Feel Fine (featured on the DVD 'On', 2007)
