= Kōsei Nenkin Kaikan =

Kōsei Nenkin Kaikan (厚生年金会館) or Koseinenkin Hall were public halls in Japan supported by welfare pension funds.

Kōsei Nenkin Kaikan halls existed in the following locations.

- Hiroshima City Cultural Exchange Hall (formerly Hiroshima Kōsei Nenkin Kaikan) in Naka-ku, Hiroshima
- Kanazawa
- Kokurakita-ku, Kitakyūshū
- Aichi Kōsei Nenkin Kaikan in Chikusa-ku, Nagoya (1980 – 2008)
- Orix Theater (formerly Osaka Kōsei Nenkin Kaikan) in Nishi-ku, Osaka
- Tokyo Kōsei Nenkin Kaikan in Shinjuku, Tokyo (1961 – 31 March 2010)
- Hokkaido Kōsei Nenkin Kaikan in Chūō-ku, Sapporo
- Osaka

At least the following musicians have released recordings from Tokyo Kōsei Nenkin Kaikan:

- The Ventures, Ventures in Japan, 1965
- Buck Owens and The Buckaroos, In Japan! , 1967
- Masayuki Takayanagi & Kaoru Abe, 28 June 1970
- Deep Purple, 15 & 16 August 1972, Made in Japan
- Herbie Hancock, Dedication, 21 September 1974
- Cannonball Adderley, The Japanese Concerts, 1975
- Milt Jackson, 1976
- Camel, 27 January 1980
- Dream Theater, 23 August 1993
- King Crimson, 14 October 1995
- Steve Hackett, The Tokyo Tapes, 16 & 17 December 1996
- Rainbow, 5, 8 & 9 December 1976, On Stage recordings
- Frank Zappa, 3 February 1976
- Yellow Magic Orchestra, 7 May 1980
- Journey, Captured (Journey album), 13 October 1980
