= Ryotaro Shimizu =

Japanese actor (1988–2026)

- 清水 良太郎
- Born: 15 August 1988; Tokyo, Japan
- Died: 1 August 2026 (aged 37); Tokyo, Japan
- Occupations: Actor; impressionist
- Years active: 2006–2017
- Height: 177 cm (5 ft 10 in)
- Father: Akira Shimizu

Ryotaro Shimizu (清水 良太郎, Shimizu Ryōtarō; 15 August 1988 – 1 August 2026) was a Japanese actor and impressionist. He graduated from Iwakura High School Commerce Department. After belonging to Production Ogi, he was represented by Shimizu Agency.

Shimizu's father is Akira Shimizu, who is also an impressionist, and they first co-starred in the 18 March 2011 broadcast of Bakushō sokkuri monomane Kōhaku Uta Gassen Special (Fuji Television).

== Life and career ==
Ryotaro Shimizu was born in Tokyo, Japan on 15 August 1988. After enrolling in Iwakura High School Commerce Department in 2006, Shimizu debuted as an actor in the Taiga drama Kōmyō ga Tsuji (NHK). He was a member of the school baseball team.

Shimizu's career as an impressionist began with his first appearance on Bakushō sokkuri monomane Kōhaku Uta Gassen Special (Fuji TV) in March 2011. In October of the same year, he won the All Star Geinōjin Uta ga umai Ōzakettei-sen Special (Fuji TV) championship.

He married in May 2016, with his wife giving birth to a girl on 8 November.

Shimizu was reported to have been caught gambling at an illegal gambling center with actor Kaname Endo in the photo weekly magazine Friday released on 10 February 2017. It was also announced that the musical Hana Gubijin in which it had been scheduled from March to April of that same year received his report.

On 22 December 2017, Shimizu was charged with illegal stimulant use after being reported to the police by an out-call prostitution service for drug use in October. He was given a three-year sentence, with half to be commuted.

Shimizu died by suicide on 1 August 2026, at the age of 37.

== Filmography ==
=== Television dramas ===
Year	Title	Role	Network
2006	Kōmyō ga Tsuji	Yamanouchike's soldier	NHK
2007	Elite Yankee Saburo	Keita Shiraishi	TV Tokyo
2008	Full Swing	Baseball Club Captain Ishida	NHK
2008	Gokusen	Ryotaro Katsura	NTV
2008	Cat Street	High school student Haruji	NHK
2011	Hanchō –Jinnan-sho Asaka Han– Series 4 –Seigi no Daishō–	Ogata	TBS
2012	Setagaya Chūzai Deka	Akira Shibata	TBS
2013	Amachan	Young Yukio Hashi (20)	NHK

=== TV variety ===
Year	Title	Network
2011	Bakushō sokkuri monomane Kōhaku Uta Gassen Special	Fuji TV
2011	All Star Geinōjin Uta ga umai Ōzakettei-sen Special	Fuji TV
2011	Sennyū! Real Scoop	Fuji TV
2012	VS Arashi	Fuji TV
2012	Honma dekka!? TV	Fuji TV
2012	Dare datte Haran Bakushō	NTV
2012	The Best House 123	Fuji TV
2012	Kanjani no Shiwake Eight	TV Asahi
2012	Monomane Ōzaketteisen	Fuji TV
2014	Otona no Kiss Eigo	Fuji TV
	Lion no gokigen yō	Fuji TV
	Waratte Iitomo!	Fuji TV

=== Films ===
Year	Title	Role
2009	Gokusen: The Movie	Ryotaro Katsura
2011	Kenka Banchō Gekijō-ban: Ichinensensō	

=== Stage ===
Year	Title	Role	Ref.
	Tenimyu The Treasure Match Shitenhouji feat. Kōritei	Jin Akutsu	
2009	Hikōkigumo 2009 Nagareru Kumoyo –DJ kara Tokkōtai e Ai o Komete–		
2011	Magdalene na Maria	Alexei	
2012	The Best House 123 on Stage!!		
2017	Hana Gubijin	Xiang Yu	

=== Mobile websites ===
Year	Title
2008	Hakkutsu! Ikemen Daisuki!
