= Sota Aoyama =

Japanese actor and content creator

- 青山 草太
- Born: Takeshi Tanabe; September 17, 1979 (age 46); Shimane, Japan
- Years active: 2001–present
- Known for: Kaito Touma in Ultraman Max; Sadaharu Inui in Prince of Tennis musical series Tōuta Matsuda in Death Note live action series

YouTube information
- Channel: sota aoyama
- Years active: 2020–present
- Genres: Travel; Outdoor
- Subscribers: 3.5 thousand
- Views: 300 thousand
- Last updated: 1 October 2025

Takeshi Tanabe (田部 猛司, Tanabe Takeshi) (born September 17, 1979), known professionally as Sōta Aoyama (青山 草太, Aoyama Sōta), is a Japanese male actor, vlogger, and content creator. He is best known for originating the role of Sadaharu Inui of the first generation Seigaku cast of the Prince of Tennis musical series (commonly called Tenimyu), and also played the role of Kaito Toma, the human host of Ultraman Max in the 2005 Ultraman Max series.

== Early life ==
Aoyama was born on September 17, 1979, in Shimane, Japan, his grandfather was an actor and instructor at the Izumo rural kabuki troupe "Murakumo-za,". He began performing on stage as a child. Aoyama moved to Osaka to work as a security guard before shifting to a modeling career in Tokyo.

== Career ==
=== Early acting and theater roles ===
Aoyama began his career in 2001 with his first appearance in the 2002 series, Home & Away.

Aoyama auditioned for a role of Kaoru Kaido in the musical version of The Prince of Tennis but ultimately cast as Sadaharu Inui, he appeared as a part of the Seigaku 1st generation cast on the musical from 2003 then he graduated from the role in 2005 during their ’2004-2005 Side Fudomine ~Special Match'.

During his stint in Tenimyu, he appeared in another theater show called Legend of the Beautiful and he landed a role of one of the lead characters in the drama series, Damenari!, where he played Nobuhiko Tezuka, an aspirant doctor but have to setback and began as an employee in a convenience store, Ludens.

Aoyama appeared in supportive roles in a television drama based on a manga, Holyland and an anthology-based movie, Stories Arrived by Email.

=== Gaining prominence with Ultraman Max ===
In 2005, Aoyama became more popular when he appeared in the television series, Ultraman Max, where he played Touma Kaito, who is latest member of Team DASH and a human host of the titular character. The show became popular among Japanese viewers, and its expansion of viewership outside of Japan.

Following a year later, he played Detective Touta Matsuda in Death Note, Death Note: The Last Name and its third sequel, Death Note: Light Up The New World

=== Other roles and recent years ===
In 2009, Aoyama appeared on Himitsu no Kenmin Show as the Shimane Prefecture representative, which ran from 2007 and ended in 2020 following the renewal of the show and its changed title. Following a year later when he reprised his role as Inui and reunited with the majority first Seigaku cast to perform in Tenimyu's Dream Live 7th concert to celebrate the end of the series' first season.

10 years after Ultraman Max was ended, Aoyama reprise his role for an episode in Ultraman X, then in 2020, he participated in the 1st anniversary of Ultraman Connection Live along with his Ultraman Max co-stars, Hitomi Hasebe, Sean Nichols, and series creators, Takeshi Yagi and Takashi Miike.

=== Career expansion with content creation ===
Aoyama's career expanded with the addition of content creation aside from his blogging in Ameba, he launched his YouTube Channel in 2020, where he shared some of his videos about his hobbies and outdoor or travel contents, especially his memorable experiences in Ultraman Max, which he starred in, and reunions with his fellow cast members.

== Filmography ==
=== Film ===
- Stories Received by Email (2005)
- Death Note film series- Matsuda Touta
  - Death Note (2006)
  - Death Note: The Last Name (2006)
  - Death Note: Light Up The New World' (2016)
- Girl's BOX Lovers☆High (2008) - Yoichiro Matsuda
- Sorasoii (2008) - Tabe
- Meon (2010) - Genki Nishida
- Homecoming (2011) - Kazuhiro Tokita
- Bayside Shakedown THE FINAL: New Hope (2012)
- The Hundred Year Clock (2012)
- Kuroyuri Danchi (2013) - Kanemoto
- Japan's Longest Day (2015) - Major Kenzo Kubota
- Scanner: The Man Who Reads Fragments of Memory (2016) - Detective Matsuda
- The Sun's Lid (2016) - Terada Manabu

=== Television ===
- Home & Away Episode 5 (November 2002, Fuji TV )
- Damenari! (August–October 2004, Yomiuri TV ) - Nobuhiko Tezuka
- Holyland (April–June 2005, TV Tokyo )-Kaneda Shinichi
- Ultra Series
  - Ultraman Max (July 2005 - March 2006, TBS ) - Touma Kaito
  - Ultraman X Episode 8 (September 2015, 9, TV Tokyo) - Dr. Touma / Touma Kaito
- Spring Reaches You (May 2006, Yomiuri TV) - Haruki Toyama
- Drama Complex: For Me to Be Me (October 2006, Nippon Television ) - Tonomura Kazuki
- Strange Strategy Second File (April 2007, NHK BS-hi ) - Hiroshi Nomura
- Rising Summer Clouds' (June–July 2007, NHK ) - Hanayama Tarozaemon
- Teacher's Secret (August 2007, NHK) - Shimizu Shonosuke
- The Man Most Fooled by L ~Detective Matsuda's Case File~ (February 2008, Nippon Television) - Matsuda Touta
- Hit Maker: Aku Yu Story (August 2008, Nippon Television)
- Otohime Episode 92 "The Girl Who Shouts Love" (September 2008, TV Asahi )
- Saturday Premium This is Good!! The Legend of Fujio Akatsuka (November 2008, Fuji TV) - Fujiko Fujio
- Welcome back to the Butler Cafe Episode 7 (February 2009, Mainichi Broadcasting System ) - Sakura Shun
- Gradually the 25th week (March 2009, NHK) - Makoto Kuroda
- The "Dandan" Notebook (March 2009, NHK)
- Kurohyou: Like a Dragon New Chapter Episodes 4 and 5 (October–November 2010, MBS) - Kengo Morita
- Welcome to the El Palacio (October–December 2011, TV Tokyo) - Takao Seno
- Grandpa's Wasabi (May 2012, NHK) - Ryo Oba
- Hakuoki (July–September 2012, NHK BS Premium ) - Ikezawa Bubei
- Wednesday Mystery 9 Gunriki Detective Inspector Onijima Yaichi 2 (November 2012, TV Tokyo) - Katsuya Shimazaki
- Miyabe Miyuki Mystery: Perfect Blue Episode 9 (December 2012, TBS) - Maeda Yamato
- Borrowing a Spear ~Drunken Kotoji Letter~ (January 2013, NHK) - Role: Tanezo Imamura
- Suiyo Mystery 9: Travel Writer (June 2013, TV Tokyo) - Atsushi Tanaka
- Yoshiwara Ura Doshin Final Episode (September 2014, NHK) - Jingoro
- Indigo Lover (January 2016, 1, NHK BS Premium) - Tatsuya Nakamura
- Denshichi Torimonochō 2 Episode 5 (September 2017, 9, NHK BS Premium) - Hyogo Sawaguchi
- Nukemairu ~ Three Women Visiting Ise Episode 7 (December 2018, 15, NHK) - Shingo
- Koyoshi's Wife (2019, NHK BS Premium) - Seiichiro Otani
- Mitsukuni and Me - Episode 1 (November 5, 2021, NHK BS Premium) - Akiyama Kanbei

=== Music videos ===
- Sota appeared in Kimeru's music video of "Timeless" alongside fellow Tenimyu cast members Eiji Takigawa and Naoya Gomoto.

=== Web series ===
- Ultraman Connection Live (2022) as himself

=== Stage roles ===
- Tenimyu: The Prince Of Tennis Musical Series (as Sadaharu Inui)
  - The Prince of Tennis Musical (2003)
  - The Prince of Tennis Musical: Remarkable 1st Match Fudomine (2003–2004)
  - The Prince of Tennis Musical: Dream Live 1st (2004)
  - The Prince of Tennis Musical: More Than Limit St. Rudolph Gakuen (2004)
  - The Prince of Tennis Musical: Side Fudomine ~Special Match~ (In Winter of 2004–2005)
  - The Prince of Tennis Musical: Dream Live 7th (2010)
