= Aichi Kōsei Nenkin Kaikan =

Coordinates: 35°10′05″N 136°56′50″E

- 愛知厚生年金会館
- Interactive map of Aichi Kōsei Nenkin Kaikan
- Full name: Aichi Kōsei Nenkin Kaikan
- Address: Nagoya; Japan
- Location: Chikusa-ku, Nagoya, Aichi Prefecture
- Capacity: 1,666
- Type: Public hall
- Current use: Demolished

Construction
- Opened: 1980
- Closed: 2008
- Demolished: 2008
- Years active: 1980–2008

The Aichi Kōsei Nenkin Kaikan (愛知厚生年金会館) was a public hall in Chikusa-ku, Nagoya, Aichi Prefecture, Japan. The hall opened in 1980, and had a seating capacity of 1,666 people. It closed in 2008, and has since been demolished.

== See also ==
- Kōsei Nenkin Kaikan, public halls in Japan formerly supported by welfare pension funds
