= Kyō Kara Hitman =

- Poster
- Directed by: Takeshi Yokoi
- Written by: Hiroshi Mutō (manga); Masao Iketani screenplay Masayoshi Wagatsuma screenplay
- Produced by: Toshiki Komatsu; Shigeji Maeda; Tsuneo Seto
- Starring: Shinji Takeda
- Cinematography: Tetsu Shimomoto
- Edited by: Chikako Namba
- Music by: Koji Endo
- Production company: King Records
- Distributed by: Toei Video Company (Japan, theatrical)
- Release date: September 26, 2009
- Running time: 101 minutes
- Country: Japan
- Language: Japanese

Kyō Kara Hitman (今日からヒットマン, Kyō kara hittoman) is a 2009 Japanese film adaptation of the eponymous manga by Hiroshi Mutō. It was directed by Takeshi Yokoi and stars Shinji Takeda, who also composed, arranged, and performed the film's theme song, "The Hitman".

== Plot ==
An ordinary salaryman gets mixed up in the death of a legendary hitman, and has to lead a double life as the hitman's successor.

== Cast ==
- Shinji Takeda as Tokichi Inaba
- Mari Hoshino as Misako Inaba
- Yuri Morishita as Chinatsu
- Masaya Kikawada as Dual
- Kanji Tsuda as Round Glasses
- Kaoru Abe as Nekota
- Kaname Endō as Tanaka
- Motoki Fukami as Takao
- Hidekazu Ichinose as Suzuki
- Meguru Katō
- Daijiro Kawaoka as Mushroom Head
- Takayasu Komiya as Shuichi Endo
- Ken Maeda as Kamio
- Kōichirō Nomoto
- Jirō Satō
- Mitsuyoshi Shinoda as Nonezumi
- Hiroshi Yamamoto as Gaku Yamamoto
- Tomohisa Yuge as Yaginuma

== Other adaptations ==
In 2014, Hitman was made into a web drama on BeeTV's d-Video, with Jun Kaname in the title role.

In October 2023, a new version aired as part of TV Asahi's "Friday Night Drama" series, with Arashi's Masaki Aiba taking the role of Inaba.
