= Kanagawa Kenmin Hall =

Performing arts venue in Yokohama, Japan

Coordinates: 35.4462°N 139.6471°E

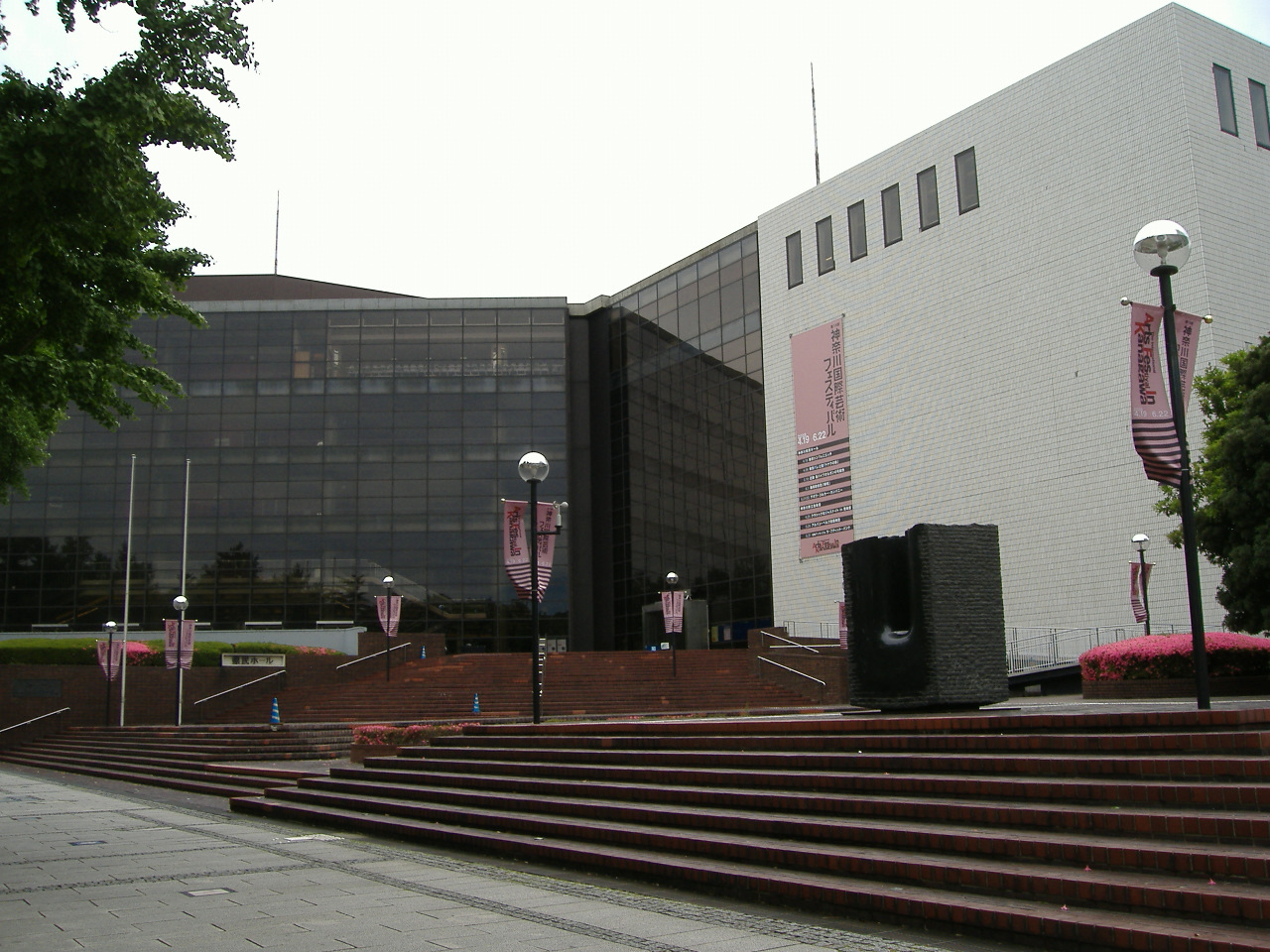
Kanagawa Kenmin Hall

Kanagawa Kenmin Hall (神奈川県立県民ホール) is a 2,493-seat performing arts venue located in Yokohama, Japan. The complex opened in 1975. Many international artists have performed at Kanagawa Kenmin Hall, including Mireille Mathieu, Linda Ronstadt, King Crimson, Chicago, Cheap Trick, Alanis Morissette, The Black Crowes, The Doobie Brothers, Diana Ross and Paul Rodgers.
