= Mitsuyoshi Shinoda =

Japanese actor (born 1981)

- 篠田光亮
- Born: October 1, 1981 (age 43); Kanagawa Prefecture, Japan
- Occupation: actor
- Notable credit(s): Akiba as Toru; Kyō Kara Hitman as Nonezumi

Mitsuyoshi Shinoda (篠田光亮, Shinoda Mitsuyoshi, born October 1, 1981) is a Japanese actor. He was born in Kanagawa Prefecture, and used to be a member of the group "JackJack".

== Filmography ==
=== Television dramas ===
- Lipstick (1999, Fuji-TV) Regular
- Fly (2000, NHK)
- Cosmos Angel (2002, 東海-TV) four Appearances
- Dame na ri (2004, Yomiuri TV)

=== Television programs ===
- Pro of ?? (2003, Yomiuri TV)

=== Films ===
- Pray (2005) as Yasuda
- Akiba (2006) as Toru
- The Prince of Tennis Live Action Movie (2006) as Sasabe
- Twilight File
- Kyō Kara Hitman (2009) as Nonezumi

=== Video games ===
- Siren (PS2, Japanese version) as Kyoya Suda (voice)
- Siren2 (PS2, Japanese version)

=== Commercials ===
- Acom Co. Ltd.
- NTT DoCoMo Mobile Phones
- Sapporo Cup Star (Sanyo Foods)
- Final Fantasy XII (Square Enix)
- McDonald's
- Yanlon Tea
- Kurearashiru?

=== Music videos ===
- Snow Dance (1999, Dreams Come True)

=== Theater ===
- Getten
- Soldier of Fortune
- Musical "The Prince of Tennis" More Than Limit feat. St Rudolph as Yanagisawa Shinya
- Musical "The Prince of Tennis" in winter 2004-2005 side Yamabuki feat. St Rudolph as Yanagisawa Shinya
- Angela - Princess of Pirates as Ramon
- bambino as Ken
- Club Gold Zipang
- bambino+ as Ken
- Memory's
- Musical "The Prince of Tennis" Dream Live 4th
- bambino2 (due) as Ken
- Sukedachi
- Musical Shōnen Onmyōji
