= Eiki Kitamura =

Japanese actor

Eiki Kitamura (北村栄基, Kitamura Eiki; born February 3, 1981) is a Japanese actor.

He was born in Kumamoto Prefecture. Harumi Inoue is his older sister, and they worked together in Rock Musical Bleach.

He has acted in television dramas and musicals, as well as a movie. He is best known for his role as Izuru Kira in Rock Musical BLEACH when he joined the cast in 2006 for Rock Musical Bleach Saien. He also briefly portrayed Takashi Kawamura in The Prince of Tennis musical series (commonly called Tenimyu) for the More Than Limit: St. Rudolph Gakuen musical.

Kitamura reprised the role of Kawamura with the revived 1st generation Seigaku cast for Tenimyu's Dream Live 7th concert to celebrate the end of the first season.

== Filmography ==
=== Drama ===
- Waterboys, Fuji TV
- ごくせん (テレビドラマ)|ごくせん（日本テレビ放送網|日本テレビ）
- 天国に一番近い男（日本テレビ放送網|日本テレビ）
- 伝説の教師（日本テレビ放送網|日本テレビ）
- 美少女H（フジテレビジョン|フジテレビ）
- FACE～見知らぬ恋人～（日本テレビ放送網|日本テレビ）
- またのお越しを（東京放送|TBS）
- Dragon Zakura (Ep.08)
- 新宿スワン（テレビ朝日）
- 世にも奇妙な物語 ( "イマキヨさん" ~ Hiroshi)
- 仮面ライダーディケイド (Kamen Rider Decade ep. 06 & 07 as Haguro Ren/Kamen Rider Knight)

=== Film ===
- ウォーターボーイズ
- 樹の海（JUKAI）
- オトシモノ
- 13の月
- ピカ☆ンチ LIFE IS HARD だけど HAPPY
- ピカ☆☆ンチ LIFE IS HARD だから HAPPY
- Ghost Train (Shigeru)

=== Musical ===
- The Prince of Tennis Musical: More Than Limit St. Rudolph Gakuen - Takashi Kawamura
- The Prince of Tennis Musical: Dream Live 7th (2010) - Takashi Kawamura

Rock Musical BLEACH series (as Izuru Kira)

- Rock Musical BLEACH Saien
- ''Rock Musical BLEACH: The Dark of The Bleeding Moon
- ''Rock Musical BLEACH: Live Bankai Show Code 001
- ''Rock Musical BLEACH: No Clouds in the Blue Heaven
- Rock Musical BLEACH The All
- Rock Musical BLEACH: Live Bankai Show Code 002
- Rock Musical BLEACH: Live Bankai Show Code 003

Other Stage Work

- 研修医魂 (a.k.a. Kendama)
- TOWER OF SUGAR
- ソウガ (SOUGA)

== Trivia ==
- Although Eiki acted in only two musicals of Tenimyu, he got to work with many of graduated members of the first Seigaku cast who got roles in BLEACH.
