= Nippon Seinenkan =

Hotel and convention complex in Tokyo, Japan

Coordinates: 35°40′34.1″N 139°42′54″E

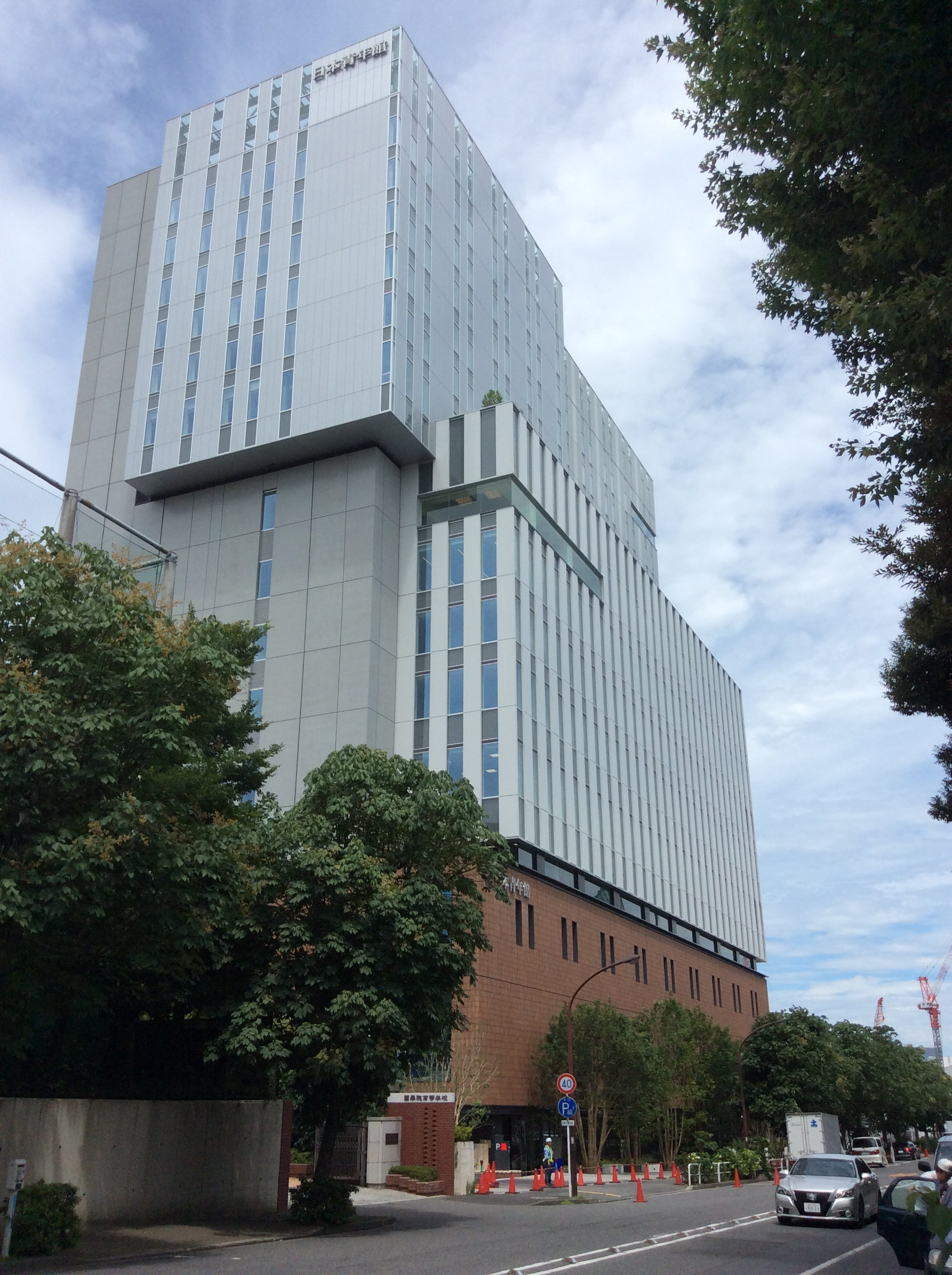
Nippon Seinenkan

The Nippon Seinenkan (日本青年館) is a hotel and convention complex in Shinjuku, Tokyo, Japan. The main hall can accommodate 1,360 guests.

== Performances ==
Musical artists who have performed at the Nippon Seinenkan include Shiritsu Ebisu Chugaku, on July 1, 2012. Others include Frank Zappa, Thin Lizzy, Dire Straits, Black Sabbath and AC/DC.
