= Kentarou Kanesaki =

Freelance Japanese actor, model and singer

- 兼崎 健太郎
- Born: June 2, 1984 (age 42); Yamaguchi Prefecture, Japan
- Occupations: Actor, model
- Years active: 2005—present
- Height: 186 cm (6 ft 1 in)

Kentarou Kanesaki (兼崎 健太郎, Kanesaki Kentarō; born June 2, 1984 in Yamaguchi Prefecture) is a freelance Japanese actor, model and singer. He has performed as Genichirou Sanada from The Prince of Tennis musicals series, Tenimyu. He was employed by Ingot Entertainment until October 31, 2019. His blood type is A.

== Filmography ==
=== Theatre ===
- 2005 NIKE WORLD CUP Show – Tokyo Motor Show 2005 Production Booth
- Ashes and The Diamonds as Ruby
- Musical Dear Boys – VS. East Honmoku as Mamoru Fujisawa
- The Dream of Flamingo「フラミンゴの夢」
- Gyakuten Saiban - Turnabout Spotlight as Phoenix Wright

TENIMYU: THE PRINCE OF TENNIS MUSICAL SERIES (as Genichirou Sanada)

- The Prince of Tennis Musical – Absolute King Rikkai feat Rokkaku ~ First Service (Winter of 2006–2007)
- The Prince of Tennis Musical – Dream Live 4th (2007)
- The Prince of Tennis Musical – Absolute King Rikkai feat Rokkaku ~ Second Service (2007)
- The Prince of Tennis Musical – The Progressive Match Higa feat Rikkai (2007)
- The Prince of Tennis Musical – Dream Live 5th (2008)
- The Prince of Tennis Musical – Dream Live 6th (2009)
- The Prince of Tennis Musical – The Final Match Rikkai First (2009)
- The Prince of Tennis Musical – The Final Match Rikkai Second feat. Rivals (Winter to Spring of 2009–2010)
- The Prince of Tennis Musical – Dream Live 7th (2010)
- Peacemaker (2011)

=== Television ===
- Kamen Rider Zi-O (2018–2019) – Swartz

== Discography ==
=== Albums ===
- Musical The Prince of Tennis Best Actor's Series 009 Kentarou Kanesaki as Genichirou Sanada and Ren Yagami as Seiichi Yukimura

Track Listings

1. "Galaxy"
2. "HOLIDAY"
3. "Hatsukoi"
4. "Instrumental – Inui vs Yanagi"
5. "Makeru Koto no Yurusarenai Ouja – Hijou no Tennis"
6. "Instrumental – Fuji vs Kirihara"
7. "Instrumental – Ryoma vs Sanada"
8. "Kimi Wo Shinjiteru"
9. "Mou Mayoi wa Nai"
10. "Kanesaki Kentarou & Yagami Ren Message for you"

=== DVD ===
- 2475 count -> L/OVE
- TIAN
- Natural Face vol. 01
- Natural Face vol. 04
- Natural Face vol. 06
- Natural Face vol. 08
- Talking Face (Kanesaki Kentarou x Herbie Yamaguchi) vol.6

== Photobook ==
- 2475 count -> L/OVE
- HAI
- Kokoro x Kokoro [心x心]
- Kokoro [心]
- Ambitious vol.2

== Internet ==
- Amegacha
- Castella with Shiozaki IRE

== Radio Show ==
- Maberaji X with Shindo Gaku https://web.archive.org/web/20080615022546/http://mrw-x.jp/
