= Masanori Tomita =

Japanese contemporary painter (born 1989)

Masanori Tomita (富田正宣, born 1989) is a Japanese contemporary painter known for abstract paintings that explore perception, materiality, and the relationship between image and surface. Working primarily in oil paint, Tomita develops compositions through layered processes that blur distinctions between representation and abstraction. He lives and works in Tokyo, Japan.

== Early life and education ==
Tomita was born in Kumamoto, Japan, in 1989. He received a Bachelor of Fine Arts from the Tokyo University of the Arts in 2013.

== Work ==
Writing in Ocula, Jonathan Griffin discussed Tomita's paintings within the context of renewed interest in abstraction, noting their emphasis on perception and the material properties of paint.

In an interview published by ARTnews Japan, Tomita described his interest in the instability of visual perception and the emergence of images through painterly processes rather than predetermined compositions.

His work has also been discussed in publications including Artforum and Bijutsu Techo as part of broader examinations of contemporary painting and abstraction.

== Selected press ==
- Jeppesen, Travis. "The Aspern Papers." Artforum (2024).
- Griffin, Jonathan. "In Los Angeles, Abstraction Takes Centre Stage." Ocula (2024).
- Yamazaki, Mirai. Interview with Masanori Tomita. ARTnews Japan (2022).
- "Fragments of Perception, Shifting Images: Masanori Tomita's Solo Exhibition." Bijutsu Techo (2018).
- "30 Young Artists Who Will Shape the Future of Japanese Contemporary Art." ARTnews Japan (2022).
- "Introducing Contemporary Artist Masanori Tomita." Artis (2022).
