= Tōru Baba =

Japanese actor, entertainer and singer (born 1988)

- 馬場 徹
- Born: June 17, 1988 (age 37); Tokyo, Japan
- Occupation: Actor
- Years active: 2003–present
- Agent: Lotus Roots
- Relatives: Yuta Baba (brother)

Toru Baba (馬場 徹, Baba Tōru; June 17, 1988) is a Japanese actor, entertainer and singer. He is best known for his role as Yagyū Hiroshi in The Prince of Tennis musicals. He was one of PureBOYS.

== Filmography ==
=== Television ===
- Vivant (2023), Govi, CEO of Belair Kosan Corp. and Nokor's business partner.
- Omusubi (2025), Naohisa Morishita

=== Film ===
- 99.9 Criminal Lawyer: The Movie (2021)
- Daisuke Jigen (2023)
- Doctor-X: The Movie (2024)
- The Honest Realtor: The Movie (2026)
