= Musical: The Prince of Tennis =

Musical

- Logo
- Music: Toshihiko Sahashi
- Lyrics: Yuuji Mitsuya
- Basis: The Prince of Tennis by Takeshi Konomi
- Premiere: 2003
- Productions: 2003–2010 (1st Season); 2011–2014 (2nd Season); 2015–2020 (3rd Season); 2021–2027 (4th Season)

Musical: Prince of Tennis (ミュージカル・テニスの王子様, Myūjikaru Tenisu no Ōji-sama), also known as TeniMyu (テニミュ, TeniMyu) for short, is a series of live action stage musicals directed by Yukio Ueshima based on the manga series The Prince of Tennis created by Takeshi Konomi and serialized by Shueisha in Weekly Shōnen Jump.

The first musical premièred in the Golden Week of 2003, and the unexpected popularity, especially among girls, and requests for merchandise of the show encouraged Marvelous Entertainment to follow through with the series. Each new show covers an arc of the manga storyline, though adaptations to the original story were made to fit the format. Female characters were removed, and irrelevant scenes or minor arcs were cut to move the plot forward.

At the start of the production, tickets did not sell out and the type of production was merely an experiment. Manga-based musicals were not frequently seen, if at all. However, the musicals soon became popular via word-of-mouth and social media enough to demand for double casting of characters to handle the number of performances and to allow for overseas performances in Korea and Taiwan. In addition multiple shows were live streamed into theatres all around the country to make up for the lack of enough seats in the actual venue. Even Europe got a taste of the production, when three of the actors (namely Ryousuke Katou, Shintarou Akiyama and Yuuichirou Hirata) hit Paris to attend the 10th edition of the Japan Expo in 2009

In May 2010, after 7 years, 22 musicals, 5 main casts and about 150 different actors, the "first season" came to an end with the last performance of Dream Live 7th on the 23rd. Not too long after the end of the first season, the start of a "second season" was commenced. The shows featured a completely new cast and a new script, but covered the same arcs as the first season. Following the end of the second season in 2014, a "third season" was made; similar to the second season, it featured a completely new cast and a new script, but covered the same arcs. The 3rd season commenced in February 2015 and ended in May 2020.

== Synopsis ==
12-year-old tennis prodigy Ryoma Echizen returns to live with his father in Japan after winning the American Junior Tournament four consecutive times. He enrolls in Seishun Academy (known as "Seigaku" for short) and joins its famous tennis team, who strives to win the National Middle School Tennis Tournament. Though Ryoma immediately becomes a regular on the team, he begins to develop his own tennis style and discover what the sport means to him as he encounters new friendships and obstacles during his journey to reach the top.

== Principal roles and cast members ==
=== Seigaku ===
Character	Original cast (2003–2004)	2nd Generation; Film adaptation (2005)	3rd Generation (2006–2007)	4th Generation (2007–2009)	5th Generation (2008–2010)	6th Generation (2011–2012)	7th Generation (2012–2014)	8th Generation (2015–2016)	9th Generation (2016–2018)	10th Generation (2018–2020)	11th Generation (2021–present)
Ryoma Echizen	Kotaro Yanagi; Yuya Endo; Kimeru	Kotaro Yanagi; Yuya Endo	Dori Sakurada	Shōgo Sakamoto	Ryuki Takahashi	Yuki Ogoe	Yuki Ogoe	Kazuki Furuta	Nichika Akutsu	Nichika Akutsu	Hikaru Imamaki
Takeshi Momoshiro	Eiji Moriyama	Masaki Kaji	Shinpei Takagi	Tetsuya Makita	Toshihiro Nobuyama	Toru Kamitsuru	Mashu Ishiwatari	Shuto Mashima	Shunsaku Yoshimura	Tatsuki Ōkubo	Shun Hojuyama
Kaoru Kaidoh	Naoya Gomoto	Kōsuke Kujirai	Kōsuke Kujirai (2006); Tomo Yanagishita (2006–2007)	Tomo Yanagishita (2007–2008); Yuichiro Hirata (2007–2009)	Akihiro Hayashi (2009–2010)	Ryosuke Ikeoka	Tatsunari Kimura	Hiroki Sana	Hikaru Makishima	Takuto Nakajima	Yuga Iwasaki
Takashi Kawamura	Yoshitsugu Abe; Eiki Kitamura	Yoshikazu Kotani	Kouji Watanabe	Gong Teyu	Hiroaki Ogasawara (2008–2009); Ikko Cho (2009–2010)	Sora Yaguchi	Shohei	Koudai Takikawa	Masaya Suzuki	Tomoki Iwata	Kai Otomo
Sadaharu Inui	Sota Aoyama	Hirofumi Araki	Masei Nakayama	Yūta Takahashi	Yusuke Arai	Teruma	Seiya Inagaki	Ryosei Tanaka	Sho Kato	Daisuke Takenouchi	Ichigo Shiota
Shusuke Fuji	Kimeru; Takashi Nagayama	Hiroki Aiba	Hiroki Aiba	Yūta Furukawa	Hiroki Aiba (2008); Taito Hashimoto (2008–2010)	Ryo Mitsuya	Yusuke Yata	Yuki Kamisato	Fuma Sadamoto	Ibu Minaki	Haruki Mochida
Eiji Kikumaru	Takashi Nagayama; Yamazaki Ichitaro	Osamu Adachi	Koji Seto	Kyousuke Hamao	Shouta Takasaki	Yuta Koseki	Mario Kuroba	Reo Honda	Seiichiro Nagata	Tsukasa Taguchi	Sosho Tomimoto
Shuichiro Oishi	Yuichi Tsuchiya	Hiroki Suzuki	Yukihiro Takiguchi	Yuuya Todoya	Yuki Tsujimoto	Jin Hiramaki	Ikkei Yamamoto	Shun Ishida	Yu Matsumura	Takanori Ezoe	Takakazu Hara
Kunimitsu Tezuka	Eiji Takigawa; Kengo Okuchi	Yu Shirota	Keisuke Minami	Daisuke Watanabe	Ryōma Baba	Takuma Wada	Hideya Tawada	Takuma Zaiki	Yuya Uno	Ryo Aoki	Kento Yamada
Satoshi Horio	Yusuke Ishibashi	Yusuke Ishibashi	Masaki Hara	Masaki Hara; Ryo Yamada	Shun Maruyama	Kento Masui	Yoshito Iwa	Seiya Shimo	Shinta Soma	Ryuga	Ryota
Kachiro Kato	Toshiyuki Toyonaga	Toshiyuki Toyonaga	Yuya Mori	Ryo Kawamoto; Tsubasa Ito	Hiroki Hirai	Shunya Ōhira	Ryo Mitsui	Ryu Shinohara	Nagato Okui	Toshiki Nakamigawa	Kotobuki Shiraishi (2021); Sena Totsuka (2022-)
Katsuo Mizuno	Masaru Hotta	Masaru Hotta	Yuki Okamoto	Koichi Eguchi; Masashi Watanabe	Rio Takahashi	Mizuki Ohno	Mizuki Kobayashi	Arata Sarashina	Shion Hatakeyama	Yumeto Okuda	Manato Ichikawa

=== Fudomine ===
Character	1st Season; (2003–2010)	2nd Season; (2011–2014)	3rd Season; (2015–2020)	4th Season; (2021–present)
Tetsu Ishida	Mamoru Miyano	Kyoshiro Takagi	Taro Nakamura	Totaro
Masaya Sakurai	Shun Takagi	Fumiya Takahashi	Ryotaro	Yuto Fukazawa
Akira Kamio	Yasuyuki Matsui; Yuki Fujiwara	Kinari Hirano	Ryujiro Izaki	Kosuke Maiguma
Shinji Ibu	Ryosei Konishi; Motohiro Ota	Kazuhiro Okazaki	Kento	Naotake Tsuchiya
Kippei Tachibana	Takuma Sugawara; YOH; Takashi Kitadai	Yusuke Ueda	Soramu Aoki	GAKU
Tatsunori Mori		Yoichiro Omi	Tatsuya Kobayashi	Rayshy
Kyosuke Uchimura		Mao Kato	Masaki Takane	Hayato Kikuchi

=== St. Rudolph ===
Character	1st Season; (2003–2010)	2nd Season; (2011–2014)	3rd Season; (2015–2020)	4th Season; (2021–present)
Ichiro Kaneda	Yuki Matsuoka	Shotaro Ōkubo	Kaisei Kamimura	Raimu Ninomiya
Shinya Yanagisawa	Mitsuyoshi Shinoda	Sho Jinnai	Riku Ozeki	Yudai Kubo
Atsushi Kisazaru	Ryosuke Kato	Daisuke Hirose	Yugo Sato	Rei Sato
Hajime Mizuki	Hidemasa Shiozawa	Yutaka Kobayashi	Kodai Miyagi	Junpei Mitsui
Yuta Fuji	KENN	Seiya Konishi	Kaiki Ōhara	Yueto Ishihara
Yoshiro Akazawa	Aoki Kenji	Kenta Izuka	Kenya Nakao	Hitoshi Okumura
Takuya Nomura			Daiki Sagawa	Shuto Yaezawa

=== Yamabuki ===
Character	1st Season; (2003–2010)	2nd Season; (2011–2014)	3rd Season; (2015–2020)	4th Season; (2021–present)
Toji Muromachi	Takahiko Yanagisawa	Kensho Ono	Yuji Nishina	Leon Terashima
Taichi Dan	Yuki Kawakubo	Reiya Masaki	Mashiro Sano	Yuki Hashimoto
Masami Higashikata	Iori Hayashi	Takeshi Terayama	Ryoshiro Tsuji	Soushi Haitsuka
Kentaro Minami	Hiroshi Yazaki	Joji Saotome	Naoya Kitagawa	Sho Kuwahara
Kiyosumi Sengoku	Masato Wada	Seiya	Touya Morita	TAISEI
Jin Akutsu	Ryotaro Shimizu; Juri	Takuya Kishimoto	Shota Kawakami	Takumi Masunaga
Inakichi Nitobe			Yuma Tonoshiro	Rin Matsubara
Ichiuma Kita			Jin Aoki	Futo Uchino

=== Hyotei ===
Character	1st Season; (2003–2010)		2nd Season (2011–2014)	3rd Season; (2015–2020)	4th Season; (2023–present)
Character	A	B	2nd Season (2011–2014)	3rd Season; (2015–2020)	4th Season; (2023–present)
Munehiro Kabaji	Ryo Washimi	Joji Kawada	Hiroyuki Furuie	Takanori Yamaki	Itsuki Kurihara
Wakashi Hiyoshi	Ryunosuke Kawai	Kei Hosogai	Daiki Ise	Akiyoshi Utsumi	Futa Sakayori
Jiro Akutagawa	Takuya	Taiki Naito	Tomoru Akazawa	Shougo Tamura	Kazan Yokoyama
Chotaro Ootori	Koji Date	Yusuke Seto; Li Yong En	Jin Shirasu	Aoto Watanabe	Riku Akashi
Ryo Shishido	Kenta Kamakari	Ryouta Murai	Kousuke Kuwano	Shunsuke Kobayakawa	Yuto Hiroi
Gakuto Mukahi	Ruito Aoyagi	Seiji Fukuyama	Jun Shison	Satsuki Kitano	Iori Kotsuji
Yuushi Oshitari	Takumi Saito	Shintaro Akiyama	Takuya Kikuchi	Ikumi Isaka	Ryono Kusachi
Keigo Atobe	Kazuki Kato	Masahiro Inoue; Yuki Kubota	Tsunenori Aoki	Hiroki Miura	Ryoya Takahashi
Haginosuke Taki			Kenta Nishijima	Shougo Yamazaki	Ryota Nakata

=== Rokkaku ===
Character	1st Season; (2003–2010)	2nd Season; (2011–2014)	3rd Season; (2015–2020)	4th Season; (2023–present)
Ryo Kisazaru	Ryosuke Kato	Daisuke Hirose	Yugo Sato	Shunki Kishimoto
Marehiko Itsuki	Shouma Ikegami	Shinichi Hashimoto	Shinnosuke Takagi	Shion Morishita
Hikaru Amane	Ire Shiozaki	Atsushi Kimura	Reiji Sakagaki	Kodai Kurihara
Harukaze Kurobane	Gaku Shindo	Shouta Motokawa	Kento Hinata	Leon Kirita
Koujiro Saeki	Kanata Irei	Daisuke Utsumi	Kaname Futaba	Arihiro Matsunaga
Kentaro Aoi	Kazuma Kawahara	Daiki Yoshida	Takuya Yashiro	Syoki Tsuru
Satoshi Shudo			Kota Chiba	Ken Nakajima
Oji				Ujisuke

=== Midoriyama ===
Character	4th Season; (2023–present)
Yasuyuki Kiraku	HARUKI

=== Rikkai ===
Character	1st Season; (2003–2010)		2nd Season (2011–2014)	3rd Season; (2015–2020)
Character	A	B	2nd Season (2011–2014)	3rd Season; (2015–2020)
Jackal Kuwahara	Jutta Yuki	Shingo Toda	Kohei Shiota	Yusaku Kawasaki
Bunta Marui	Renn Kiriyama	Mio Akaba	Junpei Yasukawa	Taka Ooyabu
Akaya Kirihara	Genki Okawa	Genki Okawa; Mitsuaki Nishimura	Motoshisa Harashima	Ryutaro Maeda
Hiroshi Yagyu	Toru Baba	Toru Baba; Ryonosuke Onoda	Ryosuke Mikata	Yuuta Oosumi
Masaharu Niou	Masataka Nakagauchi	Masataka Nakagauchi; Taisuke Wada	Hidetoshi Kubota	Dai Goto
Renji Yanagi	Kento Ono	Yuki Yamaoka	Atomu Mizuishi	Takuma Isawa
Genichiro Sanada	Kentarou Kanesaki	Kentarou Kanesaki	Ken Ogasawara	Shougo Tazuru
Seiichi Yukimura	Ren Yagami	Toshiki Masuda	Keisuke Kaminaga	Toshiki Tateishi

=== Higa ===
Character	1st Season; (2003–2010)	2nd Season; (2011–2014)	3rd Season; (2015–2020)
Kei Tanishi	Yutaka Matsuzaki	Yuki Tomotsune	Makoto Takata
Rin Hirakoba	Yasuka Saitō	Toshiyuki Someya	Naoya Iwaki
Hiroshi Chinen	Takeshi Hayashino	Yu Yoshioka	Raita
Yuujiro Kai	Hijiri Shinotani; Tsunemitsu Imai	Yoshihiko Aramaki	Tsubasa Yoshizawa
Eishiro Kite	Luke.C	Kazuki Doi	Kento Muto
Tomoya Shiranui			Masashi Sonomura
Aragaki Koichi			Haruki Matsui

=== Shitenhoji ===
Character	1st Season; (2003–2010)		2nd Season (2011–2014)	3rd Season; (2015–2020)
Character	A	B	2nd Season (2011–2014)	3rd Season; (2015–2020)
Gin Ishida	Yusuke Hirose	Yuta Yoneyama	Keisuke Yamaguchi	Ippei Mori
Hikaru Zaizen	Hisanori Sato	Hisanori Sato; Bishin Kawasumi	Ryuji Sato	Ryota Hirono
Yuji Hitoji	Ryo Hirano	Makoto Uenobori	Taishi Sugie	Tsubasa Yatsu
Koharu Konjiki	Takeya Nishiyama	Manabu Iizumi	Kaita Fukushima	Rikito Morita
Kenya Oshitari	Takuya Uehara	Kouki Mizuta	Masaki Sato	Kyohei Chida
Senri Chitose	Ryuuko Isogai	Masashi Ooyama	Keisuke Higashi	Koki Emoto
Kintaro Tooyama	Yuya Kido	Takuya Kawaharada	Koudai Matsuoka	Raima Hiramatsu
Kuranosuke Shiraishi	Kyosuke Harukawa	Yoshihide Sasaki	Shintaro Anzai	Atsuki Mashiko
Koishikawa Kenjirou				Shutaro Ando
Osamu Watanabe			Yuki Kimisawa	Masato Saki

=== Extra ===
Echizen Nanjirou:

Actor	Season
Yukio Ueshima	1st Season
Shinnosuke Motoyama	1st/2nd/3rd Season
Eiji Moriyama	2nd/3rd Season
Masanori Tomita	3rd Season
Masataka Nakagauchi	4th Season

== Reception and legacy ==
Musical: The Prince of Tennis has sold over 2 million tickets during the first 10 years of its run and is credited with the growing interest in 2.5D musicals. The musical productions were also credited for providing a starting point for young talents and launched the careers of many of young Japanese actors. The success also led its initial director, Makoto Matsuda, to launch the Japan 2.5-Dimensional Musical Association in 2014.

Musical: The Prince of Tennis celebrated its 15th anniversary with a cultural festival taking place at Sunshine City in Tokyo from 23 and 24 November 2018.

== Production history ==
The original run started in 2003 and ended in 2010 with a total of 22 different shows. During the first show, only half of the seats in the theater were filled; however, interest was spread quickly via word-of-mouth, when audience members would get up from their seats to call their friends during intermissions. Two weeks before the premiere of Remarkable 1st Match: Fudomine, Kotaro Yanagi, who was portraying Ryoma Echizen, was involved in a car accident, causing him to be pulled out of the musicals temporarily to rehabilitate. He rejoined the first Seigaku cast for their last show and finished up as the second cast's Echizen. While he was recovering, the role of Echizen was filled in temporarily by Kimeru, who was portraying the role of Shusuke Fuji, before Yuya Endo was cast as the new Echizen. Endo continued to share the role when Yanagi rejoined the production, and he graduated from the musicals during Dream Live 2nd.

After the graduation of the second Seigaku cast, Hiroki Aiba stayed on the production to provide guidance to the new cast members, and eventually graduated with the third cast. Tomo Yanagishita, who came in late as the third cast's Kaidoh, stayed on as well with the fourth cast briefly and graduated on his own during Dream Live 5th. Also, Kousuke Kujirai and Aiba returned to the production later as last-minute replacements: Kujirai returned for the third cast's debut showings of the Advancement Match, Rokkaku after Takahiro Tasaki withdrew from the show, and Aiba returned for the fifth cast's debut showings of The Imperial Presence Hyotei Gakuen feat. Higa as it seemed there was trouble casting an actor for Fuji at the time. The majority of the first cast members returned for Dream Live 7th to perform their roles once more alongside fifth cast in 2010 to celebrate the end of the first run, with the exception of Yoshitsugu Abe, who was unavailable to reprise the role of Kawamura. Eiki Kitamura, who had played the role solely in the More Than Limit: St. Rudolph Gakuen musical, filled in.

2nd Season began in 2011 and ran until 2014 with a total of 11 different shows. It featured an all new script and cast. The first Seishun Academy cast of that generation graduated at their own exclusive event in 2012, Seigaku Farewell Party, with the exception of Yuuki Ogoe, who would go on to play Ryoma Echizen for the entirety of 2nd Season. The next Seishun Academy cast, Ogoe included, graduated during Dream Live 2014, marking the end of 2nd Season.

3rd Season began in 2015. The eighth Seishun Academy cast graduated during Seigaku VS Hyotei in 2016. Followed by the ninth Seishun Academy cast graduated during Seigaku VS Higa in 2018. Lastly, the tenth Seishun Academy cast are set to graduate during Dream Live 2020, marking the end of 3rd Season.

== Productions ==
Aside from the musicals, which tell the plot of the original manga, Musical: The Prince of Tennis also tours with live concerts featuring music from the previous performances, known as "Dream Lives." Live concerts featuring music from specific teams are known as "Team Lives". Some of the shows are also classified as re-runs of a previous production, or also include a "graduation show", a special ceremony held to celebrate cast members who are leaving the production.

=== 1st Season (2003-2010) ===
Dates	Title	DVD release
30 April – 5 May 2003	Musical: The Prince of Tennis	20 September 2003
7–15 August 2003 (summer re-run)	Musical: The Prince of Tennis	20 September 2003
31 December 2003 – 5 January 2004	Musical: The Prince of Tennis: Remarkable 1st Match, Fudomine	20 March 2004
29 July – 15 August 2004	Musical: The Prince of Tennis: More than Limit, St. Rudolph	20 November 2004
29 December 2004 – 2 January 2005	Musical: The Prince of Tennis: Side Fudomine	20 March 2005
8–23 January 2005	Musical: The Prince of Tennis: Side Yamabuki	20 April 2005
8–20 August 2005	Musical: The Prince of Tennis: The Imperial Match, Hyotei, in Summer	20 November 2005
19 December 2005 – 2 January 2006	Musical: The Prince of Tennis: The Imperial Match, Hyotei, in Winter	20 March 2006
3–25 August 2006	Musical: The Prince of Tennis: Advancement Match, Rokkaku	20 November 2006
13 December 2006 – 27 January 2007	Musical: The Prince of Tennis: Absolute King, Rikkai feat. Rokkaku ~1st Service	30 March 2007
2 August – 9 September 2007	Musical: The Prince of Tennis: Absolute King, Rikkai feat. Rokkaku ~2nd Service	25 November 2007
12 December 2007 – 11 February 2008	Musical: The Prince of Tennis: The Progressive Match, Higa	3 May 2008
29 July – 3 November 2008	Musical: The Prince of Tennis: The Imperial Presence, Hyotei	22 November 2008 (4A); 21 February 2009 (Tokyo return shows); 9 May 2009 (5B)
13 December 2008 – 31 March 2009	Musical: The Prince of Tennis: The Treasure Match, Shitenhoji feat. Hyotei	11 April 2009 (4A); 27 June 2009 (5B)
30 July – 4 October 2009	Musical: The Prince of Tennis: The Final Match, Rikkai First feat. Shitenhoji	17 December 2009
17 December 2009 – 14 March 2010	Musical: The Prince of Tennis: The Final Match, Rikkai Second feat. The Rivals	20 May 2010

=== 2nd Season (2011-2014) ===
Dates	Title	DVD release
5 January – 11 February 2011	Musical: The Prince of Tennis 2nd Season: Seigaku VS Fudomine	30 April 2011
31 March – 15 May 2011	Musical: The Prince of Tennis 2nd Season: Seigaku VS St. Rudolph and Yamabuki	30 July 2011
15 July – 24 September 2011	Musical: The Prince of Tennis 2nd Season: Seigaku VS Hyotei	9 December 2011
17 December 2011 – 12 February 2012	Musical: The Prince of Tennis 2nd Season: Seigaku VS Rokkaku	2 June 2012
13 July – 23 September 2012	Musical: The Prince of Tennis 2nd Season: Seigaku VS Rikkai	28 December 2012
20 December 2012 – 17 February 2013	Musical: The Prince of Tennis 2nd Season: Seigaku VS Higa	24 May 2013
11 July 2013 – 29 September 2013	Musical: The Prince of Tennis 2nd Season: National Tournament: Seigaku VS Hyotei	11 December 2013
19 December 2013 – 2 March 2014	Musical: The Prince of Tennis 2nd Season: Seigaku VS Shitenhoji	24 May 2014
12 July 2014 – 28 September 2014	Musical: The Prince of Tennis 2nd Season: National Tournament: Seigaku VS Rikkai	26 December 2014

=== 3rd Season (2015-2020) ===
Dates	Title	DVD release
13 February – 17 May 2015	Musical: The Prince of Tennis 3rd Season: Seigaku VS Fudomine	28 August 2015
5 September – 3 November 2015	Musical: The Prince of Tennis 3rd Season: Seigaku VS St. Rudolph	13 February 2016
24 December 2015 – 21 February 2016	Musical: The Prince of Tennis 3rd Season: Seigaku VS Yamabuki	3 June 2016
14 July – 25 September 2016	Musical: The Prince of Tennis 3rd Season: Seigaku VS Hyotei	17 December 2016
22 December 2016 – 12 February 2017	Musical: The Prince of Tennis 3rd Season: Seigaku VS Rokkaku	26 May 2017
14 July 2017 – 1 October 2017	Musical: The Prince of Tennis 3rd Season: Seigaku VS Rikkai	7 February 2018
21 December 2017 – 18 February 2018	Musical: The Prince of Tennis 3rd Season: Seigaku VS Higa	19 May 2018
12 July 2018 – 24 September 2018	Musical: The Prince of Tennis 3rd Season: Nationals Seigaku VS Hyotei	26 January 2019
20 December 2018 – 17 February 2019	Musical: The Prince of Tennis 3rd Season: Seigaku VS Shitenhoji	31 May 2019
11 July 2019 – 29 September 2019	Musical: The Prince of Tennis 3rd Season: Nationals Seigaku VS Rikkai First Half	21 December 2019
19 December 2019 – 16 February 2020	Musical: The Prince of Tennis 3rd Season: Nationals Seigaku VS Rikkai Second Half	22 May 2020

=== 4th Season (2021-) ===
Dates	Title	DVD release
9 July 2021 – 29 August 2021	Musical: The Prince of Tennis 4th Season: Seigaku VS Fudomine	24 December 2021
5 July 2022 – 28 August 2022	Musical: The Prince of Tennis 4th Season: Seigaku VS St. Rudolph and Yamabuki	21 December 2022
7 January 2023 – 5 March 2023	Musical: The Prince of Tennis 4th Season: Seigaku VS Hyotei	5 July 2022

=== Concerts ===
Dates	Title	DVD release
13 June 2004	Musical: The Prince of Tennis: Dream Live 1st	1 September 2004
4 May 2005	Musical: The Prince of Tennis: Dream Live 2nd	20 September 2005
28–29 March 2006	Musical: The Prince of Tennis: Dream Live 3rd	20 June 2006
30–31 March 2007	Musical: The Prince of Tennis: Dream Live 4th	27 July 2007
17–20 May 2007	Musical: The Prince of Tennis: Dream Live 4th	27 July 2007
17–18 May 2008	Musical: The Prince of Tennis: Dream Live 5th	10 August 2008
24–25 May 2008	Musical: The Prince of Tennis: Dream Live 5th	10 August 2008
2–3 May 2009	Musical: The Prince of Tennis: Dream Live 6th	30 July 2009
9–10 May 2009	Musical: The Prince of Tennis: Dream Live 6th	30 July 2009
7–9 May 2010	Musical: The Prince of Tennis: Dream Live 7th	9 September 2010
20–21 May 2010	Musical: The Prince of Tennis: Dream Live 7th	9 September 2010
5 – 13 November 2011	Musical: The Prince of Tennis 2nd Season: Dream Live 2011	9 February 2012
27 April – 5 May 2013	Musical: The Prince of Tennis 2nd Season: Dream Live 2013	7 August 2013
15–24 November 2014	Musical: The Prince of Tennis 2nd Season: Dream Live 2014	27 February 2015
10–28 June 2015	Musical: The Prince of Tennis 3rd Season: Team Live Seigaku	18 August 2015
29 July – 9 August 2015	Musical: The Prince of Tennis 3rd Season: Team Live Fudomine	26 October 2015
13–22 May 2016	Musical: The Prince of Tennis 3rd Season: Dream Live 2016	25 August 2016
12–23 April 2017	Musical: The Prince of Tennis 3rd Season: Team Live Hyotei	3 August 2017
26–28 May 2017	Musical: The Prince of Tennis 3rd Season: Dream Live 2017	22 September 2017
5–20 May 2018	Musical: The Prince of Tennis 3rd Season: Dream Live 2018	20 September 2017
22–31 May 2020	≠Musical: The Prince of Tennis 3rd Season: Dream Live 2020	Show Cancelled

=== Events ===
Date	Title	Notes	DVD release
13 May 2012	Musical: The Prince of Tennis 2nd Season: Spring Undoukai 2012	Sports competition with the cast members	5 October 2012
11 October 2012 – 14 October 2012	Musical: The Prince of Tennis 2nd Season: Seigaku Farewell Party	Seigaku 6th Generation Graduation event for the 2011 Seishun Academy cast	8 February 2013
26 April 2014	Musical: The Prince of Tennis 2nd Season: Spring Undokai 2014	Sports competition with the cast members	6 August 2014
17 March – 3 April 2016	Musical: The Prince of Tennis 3rd Season: Team Live St. Rudolph and Yamabuki	A talk event with the St.Rudolph and Yamabuki casts with a short performance at the end, not a concert unlike Seigaku, Fudomine and Hyotei	25 August 2016
26 October - 5 November 2017	Musical: The Prince of Tennis 3rd Season: Team Party Seigaku and Rokkaku	A talk event with the Ninth Seigaku, and Rokkaku casts with a short performance at the end, not a concert unlike Seigaku, Fudomine and Hyotei	7 February 2018
5–8 April 2018	Musical: The Prince of Tennis 3rd Season: Team Party Rikkai	A talk event with the Rikkai cast with a short performance at the end, not a concert unlike Seigaku, Fudomine and Hyotei	20 September 2018
17–28 October 2018	Musical: The Prince of Tennis 3rd Season: Team Party Seigaku and Higa	A talk event with the Tenth Seigaku, and Higa casts with a short performance at the end, not a concert unlike Seigaku, Fudomine and Hyotei	26 January 2019
23–24 November 2018	Musical: The Prince of Tennis 3rd Season: Cultural Festival	An event celebrating the 15-year history of The Musical.	N/A
23 May - 1 June 2019	Musical: The Prince of Tennis 3rd Season: Team Party Shitenhoji	A talk event with the Shitenhoji cast with a short performance at the end, not a concert unlike Seigaku, Fudomine and Hyotei	21 December 2019
8–9 October 2019	Musical: The Prince of Tennis 3rd Season: Autumn Undokai 2019	Sports competition with the cast members	31 January 2020
26 February – 1 March 2020	Musical: The Prince of Tennis 3rd Season: Thank You Festival	A talk event with all the 3rd-season casts	N/A

== DVD releases ==
=== 1st season ===
==== Supporter DVDs ====
Year	Release	Title
2006	20 August	Supporter's DVD Vol.01 Seigaku 2nd Cast
2006	30 October	Supporter's DVD Vol.02 Yamabuki Cast
2006	16 December	Supporter's DVD Vol.03 Hyoutei Cast
2007	20 February	Supporter's DVD Vol.04 Fudoumine Cast & St. Rudolph Cast
2007	28 April	Supporter's DVD Vol.05 Seigaku 1st Cast
2007	22 December	Supporter's DVD Vol.06 Seigaku 3rd Cast
2007	22 December	Supporter's DVD Vol.06 Seigaku 3rd cast + Graduation
2008	5 April	Supporter's DVD Vol.07 Rokkaku cast
2008	20 September	Supporter's DVD Vol.08 Rikkaidai Fuzoku cast
2009	7 March	Supporter's DVD Vol.09 Higa cast
2009	29 October	Supporter's DVD Vol.10 Seigaku 4th Cast TOP ver.
2009	29 October	Supporter's DVD Vol.10 Seigaku 4th Cast BOTTOM ver.
2009	28 November	Supporter's DVD Vol.11 Hyoutei Nationals cast
2010	27 February	Supporter's DVD Vol.12 Shitenhouji A cast
2010	27 February	Supporter's DVD Vol.13 Shitenhouji B cast
2010	31 July	Supporter's DVD Vol.14 Seigaku 5th cast
2010	30 September	Supporter's DVD Vol. 15 Rikkaidai Fuzoku Nationals cast

==== Extra ====
Year	Release	Title
2009	24 July	TENIMYU COLLECTION Musical the Prince of Tennis: The Absolute King Rikkaidai ~1st Service: No bonus material
2009	24 July	TENIMYU COLLECTION Musical the Prince of Tennis: The Absolute King Rikkaidai ~2nd Service: No bonus material
2010	28 April	Musical the Prince of Tennis ENCORE! ~ FGKS/On My Way

=== 2nd season ===
==== Team Collection ====
Year	Release	Title
2012	9 March	Musical The Prince of Tennis 2nd Season: Team Collection Fudoumine
2012	4 April	Musical The Prince of Tennis 2nd Season: Team Collection St.Rudolph
2012	11 May	Musical The Prince of Tennis 2nd Season: Team Collection Yamabuki
2012	7 September	Musical The Prince of Tennis 2nd Season: Team Collection Hyoutei
2013	15 March	Musical The Prince of Tennis 2nd Season: Team Collection Seigaku 6th generation
2013	19 September	Musical The Prince of Tennis 2nd Season: Team Collection Rokkaku
2013	5 October	Musical The Prince of Tennis 2nd Season: Team Collection Rikkai
2014	7 February	Musical The Prince of Tennis 2nd Season: Team Collection Higa
2015	16 April	Musical The Prince of Tennis 2nd Season: Team Collection Seigaku 7th generation
2015	1 May	Musical The Prince of Tennis 2nd Season: Team Collection Shitenhouji

==== Extra ====
Year	Release	Title
2010	18 December	Musical The Prince of Tennis 2nd Season: The Beginning
2011	4 November	Musical The Prince of Tennis 2nd Season: 2nd season THE BACKSTAGE scene1
2012	30 November	Musical The Prince of Tennis 2nd Season: PV COLLECTION
2013	5 April	Musical The Prince of Tennis 2nd Season: 2nd season THE BACKSTAGE scene2
2014	17 January	Musical The Prince of Tennis 2nd Season: PV COLLECTION vol.2
2014	2 March	Musical The Prince of Tennis 2nd Season: 2nd season THE BACKSTAGE scene3
2015	23 January	Musical The Prince of Tennis 2nd Season: PV COLLECTION vol.3
2015	31 March	Musical The Prince of Tennis 2nd Season: 2nd season THE BACKSTAGE scene4

=== 3rd season ===
==== Variety Smash! ====
Year	Release	Title
2016	14 March	Musical The Prince of Tennis 3rd Season: Variety Smash! Vol.1
2017	3 February	Musical The Prince of Tennis 3rd Season: Variety Smash! Vol.2
2018	5 March	Musical The Prince of Tennis 3rd Season: Variety Smash! Vol.3
2019	10 April	Musical The Prince of Tennis 3rd Season: Variety Smash! Vol.4
2020	27 March	Musical The Prince of Tennis 3rd Season: Variety Smash! Vol.5
2020	23 October	Musical The Prince of Tennis 3rd Season: Variety Smash! Vol.6

==== ROAD ====
Year	Release	Title
2016	4 April	Musical The Prince of Tennis 3rd Season: ROAD Vol.1
2017	24 March	Musical The Prince of Tennis 3rd Season: ROAD Vol. 2
2018	5 April	Musical The Prince of Tennis 3rd Season: ROAD Vol. 3
2019	24 March	Musical The Prince of Tennis 3rd Season: ROAD Vol. 4
2020	10 April	Musical The Prince of Tennis 3rd Season: ROAD Vol. 5

== Discography ==
Each musical, excluding the winter performance of "The Imperial Match Hyoutei" and the summer performance of "Musical The Prince of Tennis" had a CD released, featuring all songs sung during the musical. Besides that 4 singles and 13 "Best of Actor Series" have been released. The singles feature multiple versions of the same song, already performed in the musicals. The "Best of Actor Series" CDs feature multiple song sung by one or two actors of the production. Some of the songs on these CDs are new, but some of them have already been performed during the musicals (by the same or other actors). For both the Musical CDs and the "Best of Actor Series" CDs box sets have been released.

Due to double casts, multiple versions of "The Imperial Presence Hyoutei" CD, "The Treasure Match Shitenhouji" CD and the "Complete Box 3" have been released.

CDs of "The Imperial Match Hyoutei in Winter" and "The Best of Actor Series 013" are only available through buying the box sets.

=== First season ===
==== Musical OST ====
Year	Release	Title
2003	24 July	Musical The Prince of Tennis
–	–	Musical The Prince of Tennis (summer performances)
2004	21 April	Musical The Prince of Tennis: The Remarkble 1st Match Fudoumine
2004	1 September	Musical The Prince of Tennis: Dream Live 1st
2004	20 November	Musical The Prince of Tennis: More than Limit St. Rudolph
2005	21 March	Musical The Prince of Tennis: Side Fudoumine
2005	21 April	Musical The Prince of Tennis: Side Yamabuki
2005	20 August	Musical The Prince of Tennis: Dream Live 2nd
2005	20 November	Musical The Prince of Tennis: Imperial Match Hyoutei in Summer
–	–	Musical The Prince of Tennis: The Imperial Match Hyoutei in Winter: only released in combination with "Complete Box Set 1"
2006	14 June	Musical The Prince of Tennis: Dream Live 3rd
2006	15 November	Musical The Prince of Tennis: Advancement Match Rokkaku
2007	28 March	Musical The Prince of Tennis: Absolute King Rikkaidai ~1st Service
2007	27 June	Musical The Prince of Tennis: Dream Live 4th
2007	14 November	Musical The Prince of Tennis: Absolute King Rikkaidai ~2nd Service
2008	23 April	Musical The Prince of Tennis: The Progressive Match Higa
2008	17 July	Musical The Prince of Tennis: Dream Live 5th
2008; 2008; 2009	5 November; 3 December; 7 January	Musical The Prince of Tennis: The Imperial Presence Hyoutei 4A; Musical The Prince of Tennis: The Imperial Presence Hyoutei 5B; Musical The Prince of Tennis: The Imperial Presence Hyoute Tokyo Return Shows (in October)
2009	25 March; 24 June	Musical The Prince of Tennis: The Treasure Match Shitenhouji 4A; Musical The Prince of Tennis: The Treasure Match Shitenhouji 5B
2009	8 July	Musical The Prince of Tennis: Dream Live 6th
2009	17 December	Musical The Prince of Tennis: The Final Match Rikkaidai First
2010	12 May	Musical The Prince of Tennis: The Final Match Rikkaidai Second
2010	25 August	Musical The Prince of Tennis: Dream Live 7th

==== Singles ====
Year	Release	Title
2006	22 March	On My Way
2007	28 March	Finalist
2008	23 April	F.G.K.S.
2009	30 April	Refresh Aratana Jibun e ~Hyoutenka no Jounetsu ~ The TOP

==== Best of Actor Series ====
Year	Release	Title
2005	19 December	The Best of Actor Series 001: Shirota Yuu as Tezuka Kunimitsu
2005	19 December	The Best of Actor Series 002: Kato Kazuki as Atobe Keigo
2006	26 July	The Best of Actor Series 003: Aiba Hiroki as Fuji Syusuke
2006	26 July	The Best of Actor Series 005: Saito Takumi as Oshitari Yuushi and Aoyagi Ruito as Mukahi Gakuto
2006	16 December	The Best of Actor Series 005: Sakurada Dori as Echizen Ryoma
2006	16 December	The Best of Actor Series 006: IRE as Amane Hikaru and Shindo Gaku as Kuroban Harukaze
2007	25 July	The Best of Actor Series 007: Seto Kouji as Kikumaru Eiji and Takiguchi Yukihiro as Ooishi Syuichirou
2007	25 July	The Best of Actor Series 008: Nakagauchi Masataka as Niou Masaharu and Baba Toru as Yagyuu Hiroshi
2007	22 December	The Best of Actor Series 009: Kanesaki Kentarou as Sanada Genichirou and Yagami Ren as Yukimura Seiichi
2007	22 December	The Best of Actor Series 010 Extra: Seigaku 3rd Regulars Memorial Edition
2008	30 July	The Best of Actor Series 011: Watanabe Daisuke as Tezuka Kunimitsu
2008	30 July	The Best of Actor Series 012: Luke. C as Eishiro Kite
–	–	The Best of Actor Series 013: Karaoke CD: Only released in combination with the Complete Box

==== Complete Box Sets ====
Year	Release	Title
2006	26 July	Complete Box 1: Musical the Prince of Tennis, Remarkble 1st match Fudoumine, More than Limit St. Rudolph, Side Fudoumine, Side Yamabuki, The Imperial match Hyoutei in Winter + Extra CD
2009	25 March	Best of Actors Series Complete Box: Best of Actor Series 001-013
2009	26 November	Complete Box 2: The Imperial match Hyoutei in Summer, Advancement Match Rokkaku, Absolute King Rikkaidai ~first service, Absolute King Rikkaidai ~second service + The Final Match Rikkai First (Support Cast Version)
2010	20 May	Complete Box 3 ver. 4: The Progressive Match Higa, The Imperial Presence Hyoutei 4A, The Treasure Match Shitenhouji 4A + The Final Match Rikkai First; Complete Box 3 ver. 5: The Progressive Match Higa, The Imperial Presence Hyoutei 5B, The Treasure Match Shitenhouji 5B + The Final Match Rikkai First

=== Second season ===
==== Musical OST ====
Year	Date	Title
2011	21 April	Musical the Prince of Tennis: Seigaku vs. Fudoumine
2011	13 July	Musical the Prince of Tennis: Seigaku vs. St.Rudolph/ Yamabuki
2011	30 November	Musical the Prince of Tennis: Seigaku vs. Hyoutei
2012	22 February	Musical the Prince of Tennis: Dream Live 2011
2012	23 May	Musical the Prince of Tennis: Seigaku vs. Rokkaku
2012	26 December	Musical the Prince of Tennis: Seigaku vs. Rikkai
2013	6 February	Musical the Prince of Tennis: Seigaku Farewell Party
2013	22 May	Musical the Prince of Tennis: Seigaku vs. Higa
2013	7 August	Musical the Prince of Tennis: Dream Live 2013
2013	12 November	Musical the Prince of Tennis: National Tournament Seigaku vs. Hyoutei
2014	28 May	Musical the Prince of Tennis: Seigaku vs. Shitenhouji
2015	1 January	Musical the Prince of Tennis: National Tournament Seigaku vs. Rikkai
2015	4 March	Musical the Prince of Tennis: Dream Live 2014

==== Single CD ====
Year	Date	Title
2011	28 September	Musical the Prince of Tennis: JUMPING UP! HIGH TOUCH! + DVD [First press limited] Type A
2011	28 September	Musical the Prince of Tennis: JUMPING UP! HIGH TOUCH! (Normal edition) Type B
2011	28 September	Musical the Prince of Tennis: JUMPING UP! HIGH TOUCH! (Normal edition) Type C
2011	28 September	Musical the Prince of Tennis: JUMPING UP! HIGH TOUCH! (Normal edition) Type D
2013	24 April	Musical the Prince of Tennis: WE ARE ALWAYS TOGETHER TYPE A
2013	24 April	Musical the Prince of Tennis: WE ARE ALWAYS TOGETHER TYPE B

=== Third season ===
==== Musical OST ====
Year	Release	Title
2015	16 September	Musical the Prince of Tennis 3rd Season: Seigaku VS Fudoumine
2016	9 March	Musical the Prince of Tennis 3rd Season: Seigaku VS St.Rudolph
2016	6 July	Musical the Prince of Tennis 3rd Season: Seigaku VS Yamabuki
2016	21 September	Musical the Prince of Tennis 3rd Season: Dream Live 2016
2017	27 January	Musical the Prince of Tennis 3rd Season: Seigaku VS Hyoutei
2017	12 July	Musical the Prince of Tennis 3rd Season: Seigaku VS Rokkaku
2017	18 October	Musical the Prince of Tennis 3rd Season: Dream Live 2017
2018	24 January	Musical the Prince of Tennis 3rd Season: Seigaku VS Rikkai
2018	20 June	Musical the Prince of Tennis 3rd Season: Seigaku VS Higa
2018	24 October	Musical the Prince of Tennis 3rd Season: Dream Live 2018
2019	13 February	Musical the Prince of Tennis 3rd Season: Nationals Seigaku VS Hyotei
2019	12 June	Musical the Prince of Tennis 3rd Season: Seigaku VS Shitenhoji
2020	29 January	Musical the Prince of Tennis 3rd Season: Nationals Seigaku VS Rikkai First Half
2020	1 July	Musical the Prince of Tennis 3rd Season: Nationals Seigaku VS Rikkai Second Half
