= Aichi Kinro Kaikan =

Community center in Shōwa-ku, Nagoya, Japan

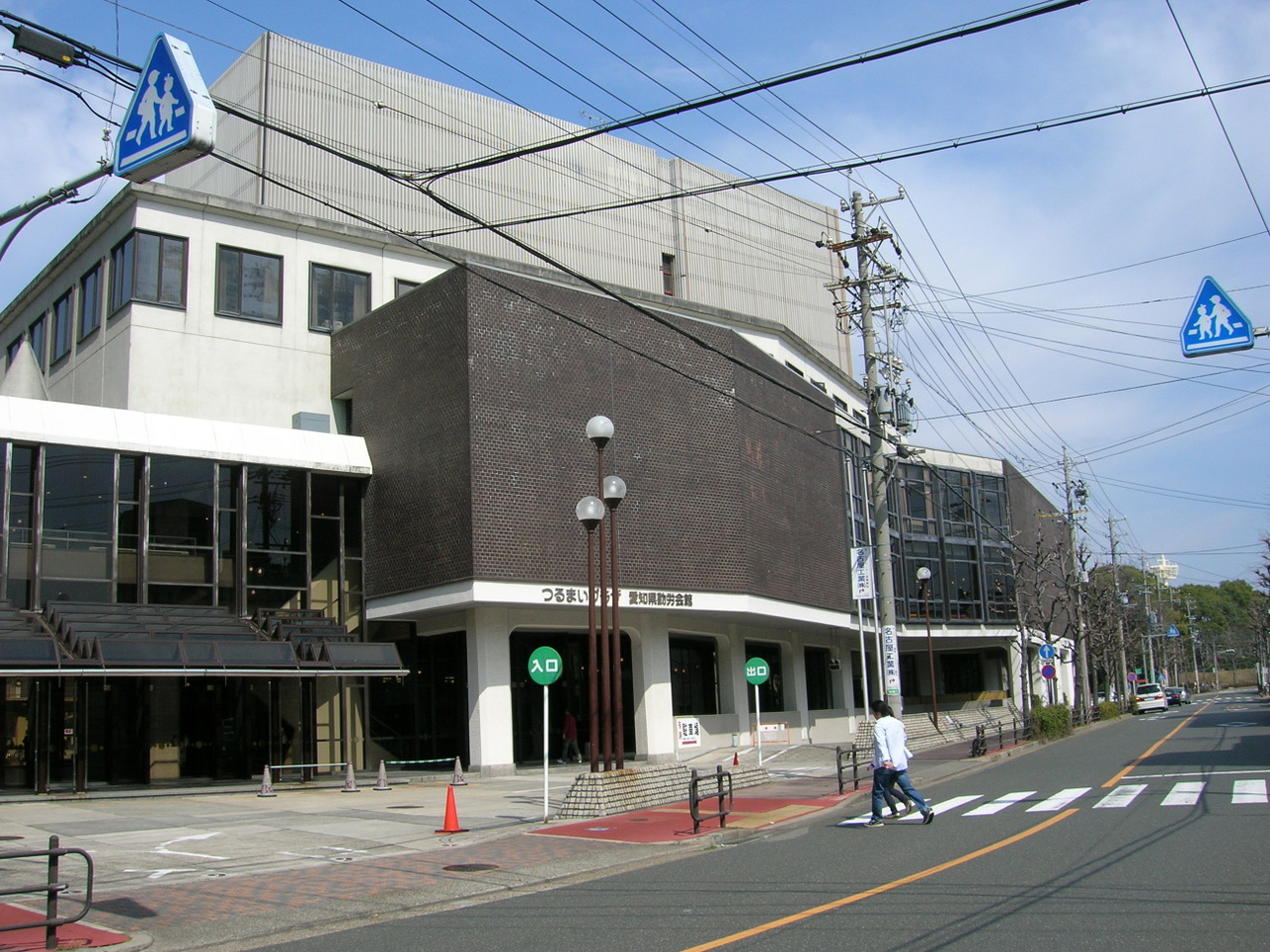
Aichi Kinro Kaikan in March 2008

Aichi-ken Kinrō Kaikan (愛知県勤労会館; also known as Tsurumai Plaza) was a community centre, exhibition centre and concert venue located in Shōwa-ku, Nagoya, Japan. Kinrō Kaikan can be translated as "workers' hall".

It had a large auditorium and several smaller rooms, including a library. Notable past performers include Metallica, Creedence Clearwater Revival, and Tom Petty.

Building was completed in June 1970. It included a large hall and a small hall, and eight conference rooms. The ~1,700-seat auditorium was called Tsurumai Hall (鶴舞ホール), and was used for events such as concerts and presentations. The building was also used for employment-related consultations, and provided labour-related books and resources. There was also a labour reading room. In 2008, the halls' utilization rate was 88.4%.

In October 2009, Aichi Prefecture, which owned Aichi Kinro Kaikan, opened a substitute facility, the Aichi Industry and Labor Center.
