= Kanata Irei =

Japanese singer-actor

kanata Irei
- Also known as: Irei Kanata (伊礼彼方)
- Born: February 3, 1982 (age 44); Argentina
- Occupation: actor
- Website: https://kanata-ltd.com

kanata Irei (伊礼彼方, Irei) is a Japanese actor. He was born February 3, 1982, in Argentina as irei (伊礼), but uses the stage name "Kanata." He is half-Okinawan and half-Chilean. He was brought up in Yokohama, Kanagawa Prefecture, Japan since he was six.

== Appearances ==
=== TV dramas ===
- Ranman (2023), Masanari Takatō
- Anpan (2025), Goro Mano
- Brothers in Arms (2026), Endō Naotsune

=== Stage ===
Year	Title	Info
2006	Musical Tennis no Ōjisama – Advancement Match Rokkaku feat. Hyōtei Gakuen	acted as Saeki Kojirō: Ran from August 3–13 in Tokyo; Followed by four performances in Osaka (August 17–19); Later on performances in Nagoya (August 23–25)
2006–2007	Musical Tennis no Ōjisama – Absolute King Rikkai feat. Rokkaku ~ First Service	acted as Saeki Kojirō: Ran in Tokyo (December 13–25) and in Osaka (December 28, 2006 – January 8, 2007)
2007	Musical Tennis no Ōjisama – Dream Live 4th	acted as Saeki Kojirō: Ran in Yokohama (March 30–31); Extra Performance in Ôsaka (May 17–20)
2007–2008	Musical Tennis no Ōjisama – The Progressive Match Higa Chuu feat. Rikkai	acted as Saeki Kojirō: Ran December 12 – February 11
2008	California Story	as Suwena Lanbâdo: Ran February 27 – March 9
2008–2010	Elisabeth	as Crown Prince Rudolf: Ran August 2008 – October 2010
2009	Aida	as Radames: Ran August–October
2010	Side Show	as Buddy Foster: Ran all April
2010–2011	Anna Karenina	as Vronsky: Ran December 2010 – March 2011
2012	Hamlet	as Laertes: Ran From February until March
2014	Thrill Me	as Richard Loeb: Ran From November 7–24
2014	The Two Gentlemen of Verona	as Speed: Ran From December 7–28
2015	Wuthering Heights	as Edgar Linton: Ran From May 6–26
2016	Grand Hotel	as Baron Felix Von Gaigern: Ran All April
2016	Crest of the Royal Family	as Ryan Reed: Ran All August
2017-2020	Beautiful: The Carole King Musical	as Gerry Goffin: Ran 2017 till 2020
2017	Memphis	as Bobby: Ran all December 2017
2018	Jersey Boys	as Tommy DeVito: Ran June 16 – October 3
2019–2021, 2024–2025	Les Misérables	as Javert: Ran From Spring 2019 until Autumn 2021; Ran From December 16, 2024 until June 7, 2025
2020–2022	Miss Saigon	as The Engineer: Ran 2020 until 2022
2022	Blood Brothers	as The Narrator: Ran sometime in 2022
2023–2024	Moulin Rouge!	as The Duke of Monroth: Ran All Summer 2023 till All Summer 2024
2023	Noises Off	
