= Koji Date =

Japanese actor and singer

- Also known as: DK
- Born: November 23, 1987 (age 37)
- Origin: Japan
- Genres: Rock
- Years active: 2007–present
- Labels: Avex Group (Japan)
- Website: www.avexnet.or.jp/joker/index.html

Koji Date (伊達 幸志, Date Kōji; born November 23, 1987) is a Japanese actor and singer. He played Ootori Chotarou in The Prince of Tennis movie and The Prince of Tennis musicals.

His first CD, named 逆光, was released on 7 November 2007, and contained 9 songs, all written and produced by Koji. He also played guitar in a band called Joker. Their first single, 'No.1', was released on 7 December 2011.

== Discography ==
Album

- 逆光(Gyakkou) (2007)
- こんな時代だから (2009)
- どーも。 (2010)

Single/EP

- 青春なんて (2010)
- No.1 (2011)(in Joker)

== Stage performances ==
- The Imperial Match Hyoutei as Ootori Choutarou
- The Imperial Match Hyoutei in Winter as Ootori Choutarou
- Dream Live 3rd as Ootori Choutarou
- Advancement Match Rokkaku feat. Hyoutei Gakuen as Ootori Choutarou
- ROCK'N JAM MUSICAL 2 as Koutarou
- Dream Live 4th as Ootori Choutarou

== Live performances ==
- FIRST DATE at Yokohama - November 23, 2005
- Second Live『Love2』DATE in Yokohama
- Date Kouji One Man Live in Shinjuku Space Zero - 24 December 2006

== TV shows ==
- Regular on Yokohama Music Explorer

== Musicals ==
- The Prince of Tennis as Ootori Choutarou
