= Kotaro Yanagi =

Japanese actor (born 1985)

- 柳 浩太郎
- Born: December 21, 1985 (age 40); Berlin, Germany
- Occupations: Actor, model
- Years active: 2002-2014, 2019-present

Kotaro Yanagi (柳 浩太郎, Yanagi Kōtarō; born December 21, 1985) is a Japanese actor.

== Early life ==
Yanagi was born on December 21, 1985, in Berlin, Germany. He lived in Germany for three years before moving back with his family to Japan. His family moved to India for work, and he lived there for three years. However, in the fourth grade, he attended an American boarding school. Yanagi's family moved back to Japan where he finished school.

== Career ==
=== D-BOYS ===
Yanagi is a member of the young men's stage acting troupe, D-BOYS, which act in skit-like performances. He acted in the web drama, Hice Cool! (Japanese: 沖縄ボーイズ), and had a supporting role in the movie Aa~! Izakaya Puroresu (Japanese: あゝ！一軒家プロレス), a wrestling film. He also acted in the drama Rocket Boys. Yanagi acted in the D-BOYS TV drama DD-Boys. His first major film role is as the otaku lead character in Chikan Otoko (Japanese: 痴漢男) In 2007, Yanagi acted in a drama named Puzzle(Japanese: パズル), where he played a prominent role with a couple of other D-boys.

In 2007, he appeared as the main character in the musical Cooky Clown (Japanese: ミュージカル Cooky Clown). In March of the same year, he participated as a guest in "Out of Order".

Yanagi originated the role of Ryoma Echizen in Musical: The Prince of Tennis (commonly known as Tenimyu). After recovering from his 2003 car accident, he continued to play his role along with the second generation Seigaku cast, which featured most of the D-BOYS members. On March 29, 2006, Yanagi graduated from the role after his performance in Dream Live 3rd. Yanagi reprised his role as Echizen and reunited with the first Seigaku cast to perform in Tenimyu's Dream Live 7th concert to celebrate the end of the series' first season.

Yanagi starred in the stage play Taikan Kisetsu. He is currently the lead character in the drama Tadashii Ōji no Tsukurikata.

In November 2014, Yanagi announced he was taking a long-term hiatus due his health.

== Personal life ==
In 2003, after leaving a rehearsal for Remarkable 1st Match: Fudomine, Yanagi was involved in a car accident. The accident resulted in head trauma from subarachnoid hemorrhage and he was in a coma for three weeks.

== Filmography ==
=== Film ===
| Year | Title | Role | Other notes |
|---|---|---|---|
| 2004–2005 | Aa~! Izakaya Puroresu | | movie |
| 2005 | Chikan Otoko | | movie |
| 2006 | Rocket Boys | | TV Tokyo |
| 2006 | DD-Boys | as himself | |
| 2007 | Puzzle | | TV Asahi |
| 2008 | Tadashii Oji no Tsukurikata | Shinozaki Tatsuya | TV Tokyo |
| 2009 | Ikemen Bank the Movie | Nashitaro Kanezoko | movie |

=== Theatre ===
| Title | Year |
|---|---|
| The Prince of Tennis Musical | 2003 |
| The Prince of Tennis Musical: Side Fudomine ~Special Match~ | 2004–2005 |
| The Prince of Tennis Musical: Dream Live 2nd | 2005 |
| The Prince of Tennis Musical: The Imperial Match Hyotei Gakuen | 2005 |
| The Prince of Tennis Musical: The Imperial Match Hyotei Gakuen in Winter | 2005–2006 |
| The Prince of Tennis Musical: Dream Live 3rd | 2006 |
| D-BOYS STAGE | 2007 |
| D-BOYS STAGE: The Last Game | 2008 |
| The Prince of Tennis Musical: Dream Live 7th | 2010 |
| The Prince of Tennis Musical: Dream Live | 2013 |
