= Hiroshima City Cultural Exchange Hall =

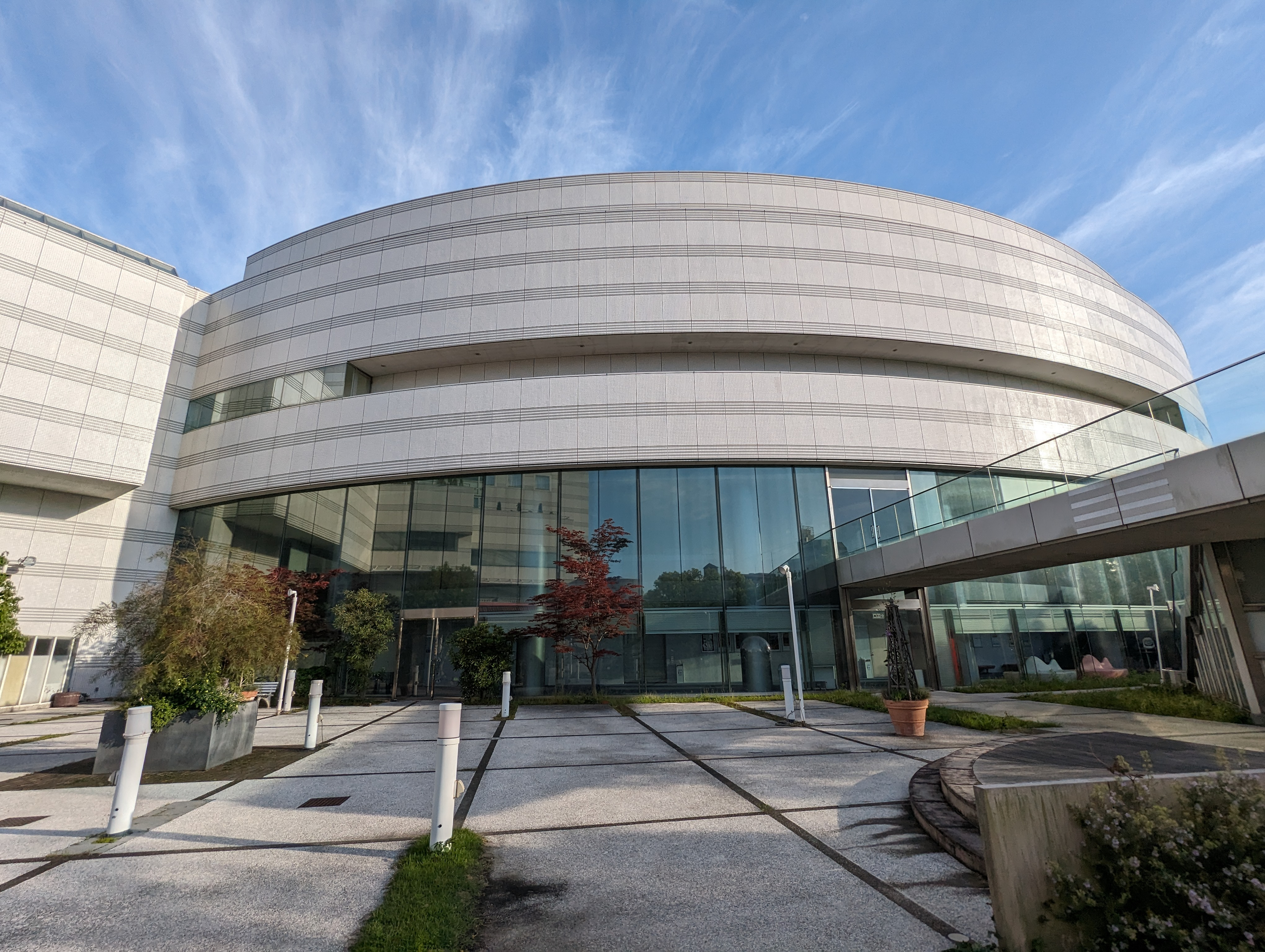
Hiroshima City Cultural Exchange Hall

The Hiroshima City Cultural Exchange Hall (formerly Hiroshima Kōsei Nenkin Kaikan) is a 2,100-seat multi-purpose facility located in Naka-ku, Hiroshima, Japan. It opened in 1985 and has hosted notable artists such as David Bowie and Def Leppard.

On September 4, 2012, Hiroshima announced that the Hiroshima Bunka Gakuen Educational Foundation purchased the naming rights of the hall section, and thus they confirmed that this hall would use the name "Hiroshima Bunka Gakuen HBG Hall" from November 1 of the same year until March 31, 2017. In March 2017, the contract was extended for the next five years.
