= Naoya Gomoto =

Japanese actor (born 1980)

- 郷本 直也
- Born: April 25, 1980 (age 46); Osaka, Japan
- Occupation: Actor
- Agent: Nano Square

Naoya Gomoto (郷本 直也, Gōmoto Naoya; born April 25, 1980 in Osaka, Japan) is a Japanese actor.

He originated the role of Kaoru Kaidoh as part of the first generation Seigaku cast in The Prince of Tennis musical series (commonly called Tenimyu). He also played Shūhei Hisagi in Rock Musical Bleach. He also did voice work for Eyeshield 21 as Seijuro Shin.

Gomoto reprised his role as Kaidoh and reunited with the majority first Seigaku cast to perform in Tenimyu's Dream Live 7th concert to celebrate the end of the series' first season.

== Notable works ==
=== Television ===
- Tokusou Sentai Dekaranger – Bileezian Vino/Gigantes
- Yowamushi Pedal Live Action – Shingo Kinjou

=== Anime ===
- Eyeshield 21 – Seijuro Shin
- Reborn! – Zakuro

=== Movie ===
- Aichaku – Ryosuke

=== Musical ===
- Rock Musical Bleach – Shuhei Hisagi
- Musical Hakuouki: Kazama Chikage Arc – Amagiri Kyuujuu
- Yowamushi Pedal Stage – Shingo Kinjou

Tenimyu: The Prince Of Tennis Musical Series (as Kaoru Kaidoh)

- The Prince of Tennis Musical (2003)
- The Prince of Tennis Musical: Remarkable 1st Match Fudomine (2003–2004)
- The Prince of Tennis Musical: Dream Live 1st (2004)
- The Prince of Tennis Musical: More Than Limit St. Rudolph Gakuen (2004)
- The Prince of Tennis Musical: Side Fudomine ~Special Match~ (In Winter of 2004–2005)
- The Prince of Tennis Musical: Dream Live 7th (2010)

=== Stage ===
- Cherry Magic! Thirty Years of Virginity Can Make You a Wizard?! – Asahina
