= List of Blood-C characters =

The Blood-C anime, sequel anime film, manga series, a stage play and three live-action films features an extensive cast of characters co-created by studio Production I.G and manga artist group CLAMP. The series is set in a fictionalized version of different areas in Japan.

The central character is Saya Kisaragi, an ordinary school girl and a shrine maiden living near Lake Suwa, who at night, hunts an ancient demonic race called the Elder Bairns. (Note: Also referred to as Furukimono (古きもの; lit. The Old Ones/Ancient Ones), and they replace "Chiropterans", the vampiric creatures that were promininent in the Blood franchise.) Her life changes drastically, as she finds out that she's been living a lie as she is an Elder Bairn in human form that was given false memories and actors that were staged to play the townspeople, her friends and family. The café owner, Fumito Nanahara, is revealed to be the mastermind behind the experiment, releases the Elder Bairns and kills off the actors, and shoots Saya on the head. Determined for revenge, she sets off to pursuit Fumito.

== Organizations ==
=== Tower ===
The Tower (塔, Tō) is a covert group led by Mahito Nanahara, and later taken over by Fumito Nanahara. The Tower is formed by Nanahara-clan and Mogari-clan, and both families controls the Shrovetide, a covenant which allows and gives the Elder Bairns to eat humans. After Mahito's death, Fumito killed both of the families to control the Tower for his own ambitions. Other members include Kūto, Fumito's bodyguard.

=== SIRRUT ===
SIRRUT is a covert group that appears in The Last Dark film, resisting Fumito Nanahara's new Youth Ordinace Bill, which enforces a curfew for minors and regulates the usage of the internet. It was formed by Kuroto Mogari, which was first formed as a small internet group. The main members consist Kuroto himself, Itsuki Tomofusa, Haruno Yanagi, Mana Hīragi, Shun Fujimura, Iori Matsuno, and Hiro Sukiyama.

== Main characters ==
=== Saya Kisaragi ===
- Voiced by: Nana Mizuki (Japanese); Alexis Tipton (English)
- Portrayed by Kanon Miyahara (Live-action)

Saya Kisaragi (更衣 小夜, Kisaragi Saya) is the main protagonist of the series. She is an Elder Bairn who was abandoned and was raised by humans, and hunts her own kind. Since the beginning of time, she protected the humans from her own kind, but as the time passed, she was shunned by the humans and buried herself in an empty coffin. During the events of Demonic Moonlight, she is then woken up by an American military officer named Lucy and started working for her. After finding out Lucy and Tower's scheme, she went berserk and tried to kill them, but Mahito Nanahara uses his magic to not only rewrite her memories, but seals her desire to kill humans. Few years later, she is captured and brainwashed by Fumito and renamed her "Saya Kisaragi".

In the events of the 2011 anime series, Saya Kisaragi is living as a high school girl and a shrine maiden with a man named Tadayoshi as her father, and defends the town at night from the Elder Bairns. Her battle with the Elder Bairns becomes difficult as they accuse her and the humans violating a covenant called "Shrovetide", and starts attacking during the day. She also meets a talking dog, who is an owner of a shop that grants wishes, and is here in town to grant someone's wish. Near the end of the series, Kanoko, her teacher and her thought-to-be-fallen friends, forces her to drink the blood of the Elder Bairn. She not only regaining all of her memories, but learns the truth of Fumito's experiment: The town was created as a feeding ground for Saya, and to see whether her "false memories" were to be altered so the oath can be broken. After Saya regains her old personality, she is forced to kill berserk Tadayoshi, who is actually an Elder Bairn-human hybrid. Fumito releases the Elder Bairns and causes a massacre on the entire town. Saya tries to stop Fumito, but she gets shot in the head. Recovering, the dog reveals that Saya made a wish to be herself. Determined for revenge, Saya sets off to pursuit Fumito.

In the events of The Last Mind, an amnesic Saya is woken up in a shopping district near Tokyo, by an unlicensed doctor named Haru, who reveals to be her fiancée. During her recovery, she meets Ran, a girl who hunts Elder Bairns. In the end, while both girls are rescuing Haru, Saya encounters Fumito again, who reveals that the town is another one of his experiment: Haru was cast as fake fiancée, Ran was the girl she killed in the long distant past. In order to save Haru from being turned into a full Elder Bairn, she lets Fumito escape, but leaving Haru with no memories of the event. She leaves her allies behind and continues her pursuit.

In Asura Girl, in a pre-World War II-era, Saya is seen with Tadayoshi, who encounters a village conflict with Special Political Police force. She is forced to kill both Ran after her uncontrollable transition into an Elder Bairn, and later Ren.

In Blood-Club Dolls 1 and 2, while still on a pursuit for Fumito to Tokyo, Saya engages in an underground fightclub called "Blood-Club", ran by Fumito's henchman, Sōen.

In The Last Dark, after she saves Mana Hīragi from an Elder Bairn in Tokyo, she meets Kuroto and SIRRUT, an internet group opposing Fumito's new ordinance law, where they help Saya achieve her goals in finding Fumito. After saving Mana again from Tsuji Private Academy ambush caused by Fumito, they bond over their loneliness. Reaching Tower's headquarters, Fumito and Kuroto reveals that they've been working together to lure Saya, and the reason why Saya's blood has been collected numerous times is that it breaks the pact between the Elder Bairns and humans. After Fumito revealing her killing Mana's dad during her arrival to Tokyo, Saya battles him, who transformed into a giant-Elder Bairn with Kuroto. Fumito reveals that he experimented himself long ago to see if he can lift his grandfather's oath on Saya. He kisses her and fades away, and she laments she's alone again.

=== Fumito Nanahara ===
- Voiced by: Kenji Nojima (Japanese); Robert McCollum (English)
- Portrayed by Keisuke Minami (Live-action)

Fumito Nanahara (七原 文人, Nanahara Fumito) is the main antagonist of the series. He is the grandson of Mahito Nanahara, who eventually takes over his grandfather's role as the leader of "Tower". In Demonic Moonlight prequel manga, he recruits Kagekiri (and renames him Tadayoshi), and both capture Saya. He takes many blood samples from her, and later brainwashes her and renames her "Saya Kisaragi".

In the 2011 anime series, he is seen as a café owner that prepares breakfast, lunch box and guimauve for Saya. In the end, he is revealed to be the mastermind of the town experiment: The town was created as a feeding ground for Saya, as well as a test to see if she reverts to her old self, and a bet to see who's the winner and a loser. He kills off the actors and shoot Saya on the head.

In The Last Mind stage play, Fumito appears as he helds Haru hostage. Fumito reveals that the town they're currently in near Tokyo was an experiment prior to Ukishima, and Haru and Ran were his test subjects. Fumito later escapes with Yūka. It is revealed through Saya's flashback that Fumito was the source to Saya's dependence on blood by his grandfather, Mahito, but changed as he developed an obsession with her.

In Blood-Club Dolls 1 and 2, Fumito is a governor of Tokyo, and is seen with Yūka in the streets of Tokyo, as she comments on his diabolical plan. He also disguised himself as a café owner once again.

In The Last Dark, Fumito is as a head of the company called "The Seventh Heaven" that controls Tokyo and its watchmen. He is seen guiding Yūka to her position as the governor, and warned by Kutō of Saya's presence in the city. He appears at Tsuji Private Academy, and revealing to be a fake as Saya tries to slice him. Near the end, Fumito reveals Kuroto, his cousin that leads SIRRUT, was working with him, and turns him into an eyeball-Elder Bairn. He battle Saya as he fuses with eyeball-Elder Bairn to turn into a giant-Elder Bairn, and he later stabs himself. He declares Saya a winner on their bet, and disintegrates.

== Ukishima experiment ==
=== Tadayoshi Kisaragi ===
- Voiced by: Keiji Fujiwara (Japanese); Bill Jenkins (English)
- Portrayed by Eiji Takigawa (Live-action)

Tadayoshi Kisaragi (更衣 唯芳, Kisaragi Tadayoshi) is an Elder Bairn-human hybrid. During the events of Demonic Moonlight prequel manga, Tadayoshi was a swordless swordsman named Kagekiri (景切, Kagekiri), who teamed up with David on investigating many mysterious cases on Elder Bairns killing humans. As both men solved the mystery of Tower and stopping Saya's rampage, both depart, promising to meet again. Century later, after David's death, Fumito recruits him and renames him Tadayoshi, and orders him to capture Saya.

In the events during the 2011 anime series, Tadayoshi is a father to Saya Kisaragi, acting as a head of the Shinto shrine, and supervises her role as a slayer of Elder Bairns. Near the end of the series, Tadayoshi is driven berserk by Fumito, due to an overdose of Saya's blood. Saya is forced to kill Tadayoshi, and he told Saya's real feelings before dying.

In The Last Mind, he appears in both flashback and as a ghost to Saya. In the flashback (as Kagekiri), he watched over Saya with Mahito to see whether she was reverting to her old self or not, and was present when Mahito made Saya promise to watch over Fumito on his deathbed. As a ghost, he acknowledges to Saya that even though it was an act, he fully embraced his role as her father, admitting his joy.

He was mentioned briefly in The Last Dark during Saya's conversation with Mana, as she said she had a father figure, who was a kind man.

=== Yūka Amino ===
- Voiced by: Masumi Asano (Japanese); Martha Harms (English)
- Portrayed by Asami Yoshikawa (Live-action)

Yūka Amino (網埜 優花, Amino Yūka) is a member of Saya's class who acts as an older sister figure, chastising Saya for being late or distracted while caring about her. In reality, Yūka is an ally to Fumito who joined his experiment in exchange for political power in Tokyo. She's the only cast member of the Ukishima experiment to survive.

In The Last Mind, it was revealed that she was the one who overdosed Tadayoshi with Saya's blood back in Ukishima, and later doing the same to Haru.

In Blood-Club Dolls 1 and 2, she is seen with Fumito, and comment on his diabolical plan.

In The Last Dark, her age is revealed to be a twenty eight year old, and still working with Fumito. At the end, she becomes the governor of Tokyo, and repeals Fumito's Youth Ordinance Bill.

=== Nene & Nono Motoe ===
- Voiced by: Misato Fukuen (Japanese); Lindsay Seidel (English)

Nene & Nono Motoe (求衛 ねね&のの, Motoe Nene & Nono) are pair of identical twins in Saya's class, who acts mischievous and often speak in unison. Nene is killed in at the shrine by the Centipede-Elder Bairn when visiting Saya, and Nono was killed by Shadow-Elder Bairn a day later. Near the end of the series, they're revealed to be alive, and to be former criminals who participated in Fumito's experiment to have their records erased, so they could find work. They're later killed by Fumito for their betrayal.

=== Itsuki Tomofusa ===
- Voiced by: Atsushi Abe (Japanese); Chris Burnett (English)

Itsuki Tomofusa (鞘総 逸樹, Tomofusa Itsuki) is the class president at Saya's school. He has an unspoken feelings for Saya, which she is oblivious to. In the end of the series, he admits that even though it was an experiment, he developed feelings for her, even if she herself wasn't "her".

In The Last Dark, it is revealed that he was one of SIRRUT members that was sent in to spy on Fumito and the whole Ukishima experiment before his death.

=== Shinichirō Tokizane ===
- Voiced by: Tatsuhisa Suzuki (Japanese); Scott Freeman (English)

Shinichirō Tokizane (時真 慎一郎, Tokizane Shinichirō) is a taciturn classmate of Saya, whom she develops a crush during the course of the series. In the end of the series, he's a mercenary taking part of the experiment on promise of a high payment. He's the first one to be killed by Fumito for their betrayal.

=== Kanako Tsutsutori ===
- Voiced by: Miho Miyagawa (Japanese); Lydia Mackay (English)

Kanako Tsutsutori (筒鳥 香奈子, Tsutsutori Kanako) is Saya's homeroom teacher and a woman with a casual joking attitude, and liking for Saya. She has a fascination towards old stories and folklore. In the end of the series, she reveals that she's a scholar who agreed to participate on Fumito's experiment and learn about Saya and prove the Elder Bairns' existence. After being saved by Saya, she is immediately killed by berserk Tadayoshi.

== SIRRUT ==
=== Mana Hīragi ===
- Voiced by: Ai Hashimoto (Japanese); Jad Saxton (English)

Mana Hīragi (柊 真奈, Hīragi Mana) is a seventeen-year-old girl, who is a member of SIRRUT that encounters Saya during the events of The Last Dark. Mana first follows Saya to Watanuki's shop, where he comments a bond between the two, and where she and Saya infiltrate Tsuji Private Academy, but ambushed by Fumito's traps. Mana opens up to Saya that she first joined SIRRUT to search for her missing father. Motivated by their heart-to-heart conversation, she helps Saya infiltrate Tower's main base by hacking. In the end, despite not knowing her father's death and Kuroto's fate, Mana begins searching for Saya.

=== Kuroto Mogari ===
- Voiced by: Hiroshi Kamiya (Japanese); Mike McFarland (English)

Kuroto Mogari (殯 蔵人, Mogari Kuroto) is the leader of Sysnet and SIRRUT, who is a cousin of Fumito Nanahara. Initially, a kind man who wanted to avenge his family's death caused by Fumito, and later revealed to be an act as he worked with Fumito, as he planned on framing Saya for Fumito's death. Planning to kill Fumito himself, it backfires as Fumito turns him into an eyeball-Elder Bairn.

=== Iori Matsuo ===
- Voiced by: Yuichi Nakamura (Japanese); Justin Cook (English)

Iori Matsuo (松尾 伊織, Matsuo Iori) is a nineteen year old SIRRUT member and a driver. Iori initially distrusts Saya, due to her stoic personality, and later warms up to her. He later falls in love with Haruno Yanagi, and both later engaged.

=== Shun Fujimura ===
- Voiced by: Yuki Kaji (Japanese); Jessie James Grelle (English)

Shun Fujimura (藤村 駿, Fujimura Shun) is an eighteen year old SIRRUT member and a former classmate to Mana Hīragi. Shun is revealed to have a slight crush on Saya, and occasionally teases Iori's crush towards Haruno.

=== Hiro Tsukiyama ===
- Voiced by: Kana Hanazawa (Japanese); Tia Ballard (English)

Hiro Tsukiyama (月山 比呂, Tsukiyama Hiro) is a thirteen year old SIRRUT member. She is a skilled hacker, and is capable of hacking from two computers simultaneously with both hands and feet. She cares deeply for Mana, as she's the one that taught her hacking abilities. Hiro has a deep love for lolita, and her favorite mascot is Mokona.

=== Haruno Yanagi ===
- Voiced by: Yuko Kaida (Japanese); Colleen Clinkenbeard (English)

Haruno Yanagi (矢薙 春乃, Yanagi Haruno) is a twenty four year old SIRRUT member and Kuroto's secretary member of Sysnet. She falls in love with Iori Matsuo, and the two later gets engaged.

== Recurring characters ==
=== Mahito Nanahara ===
- Portrayed by Keisuke Minami (The Last Mind)

Mahito Nanahara (七原 真人, Nanahara Mahito) is a character that appears in Demonic Moonlight prequel manga and The Last Mind stage play. He is Fumito Nanahara's grandfather, and the one responsible for giving Saya's false memories, as well as her curse of not being able to kill humans. In Demonic Moonlight, it was explained that Mahito's original body was kept in the coffin in order for Shrovetide to last, and his spirit possessing a body of a young man. In The Last Mind, appearing flashback, in his deathbed, he makes Saya promise to protect his grandson, Fumito, who believe has the source to her dependence on Elder Bairn blood.

=== Ran ===
- Portrayed by Kaede Aono

Ran (蘭, Ran) is a character that appears in both The Last Mind stage play and Asura Girl film. In Asura Girl, Ran is a girl who lived in an era before World War II and was diagnosed with a rare blood disease. She had a brother named Ren, and both longed for the world outside of the town. Unknown to her, the hospital used her as an experiment by turning her into a successful Elder Bairn in human form. Unable to control her berserk personality, Saya kills her. It is revealed that she and Ren are descended from the Elder Bairns, and are shown to be alive after the village is set on fire.

In The Last Mind, during the present day, Ran is now an Elder Bairn huntress. She encounters Saya again and becomes her ally as they rescue Haru.

=== Sōen ===
- Portrayed by Ryūnosuke Matsumura

Sōen (蒼炎) is one of Fumito's henchman that appears in The Last Mind. He kills off his subordinates as they fail to kill Saya. Sōen is later shot by Fumito.

In Blood-Club Dolls 1 and 2, he is seen to be alive and runs an underground fight club called "Blood-Club". He recruits the winner named Aiba, and makes him his loyal servant. He is later revealed to have a connection to a woman named Michiru Arisugawa, and related to Fumito, as his full name is revealed as Sōen Nanahara (七原 蒼炎, Nanahara Sōen).

=== Kutō ===
- Voiced by: Junichi Suwabe (Japanese); J. Michael Tatum (English)

Kutō (九頭) is Fumito's bodyguard that appears in Demonic Moonlight prequel manga and The Last Dark film. He is the head of the Tower's task force unit, and his family has been serving Fumito's family for generations. In Demonic Moonlight, he is responsible for resurrecting Mahito Nanahara through the body of a child, and assisting his plan.

In The Last Dark, he informs Fumito that the experiment escaped, and is seen ambushing and fighting Saya at Tsuji Private Academy. Later, at Tower's headquarters, Kutō uses the talisman to turn into a dog-Elder Bairn, and Saya kills him.

=== Dog ===
- Voiced by: Jun Fukuyama (Japanese); Todd Haberkorn (English)

Dog (犬, Inu) is a character that converses with Saya during the course of the anime series, being the one responsible for granting her wish to remain herself. Its true identity is a familiar of Kimihiro Watanuki, a character from xxxHOLiC manga series (by CLAMP). He later reappears in The Last Dark (both dog and human form), as he gives Saya a new sword, and notices a close bond with her and Mana Hīragi.

== Other characters ==
=== David ===
David is a character that only appears in Demonic Moonlight prequel manga. He is an American military soldier stationed in Japan in 1946. He meets and befriends with Kagekiri as he investigates his late-father's old case of the Elder Bairns.

=== Lucy ===
Lucy is a character that only appears in Demonic Moonlight prequel manga. She is an American military officer and former friend of David. She acts as a handler to Saya, and she's the one responsible for awakening Saya from her coffin. It was later revealed that she secretly partnered with Mahito Nanahara and the Tower.

=== Haru ===
- Portrayed by Mashu Ishiwatari

Haru (陽) is a character that appears in The Last Mind stage play. He is an unlicensed doctor and Saya's fiancé, later revealed to be false as he is one of Fumito's victims. He later gets kidnapped by Fumito and he is forced to turn into an Elder Bairn. After Saya rescues him, he loses his memories of the event.

=== Ren ===
- Portrayed by Ryūnosuke Matsumura

Ren (蓮) is a character that appears in Asura Girl prequel film. He is Ran's younger brother. Although he longs for the world outside the village, he cannot abandon his sister, Ran, who is his only relative, and stays in the village. He learns about the existence of the Elder Bairns from the villagers and Saya. Near the end, after Ran is killed, the blood of the Elder Bairn awakens within him, which causes his blood to boil, and asks Saya to kill him and dies. It is later revealed that he and Ran come from a lineage of the Elder Bairns, and a similar being to Saya.

=== Mokuren ===
- Portrayed by Miki Mizuno

Mokuren (木蓮) is a character that appears in Asura Girl prequel film. She is a doctor who has been experimenting on her patients for six years by turning them into Elder Bairns. She was also responsible for suppressing Ren's seizures to prevent his awakening, and successfully turns Ran into an Elder Bairn.

=== Aiba ===
- Portrayed by Ryō Kitazano

Aiba (藍刃) is a character that appears in Blood-Club Dolls 1 and 2. Aiba is a young man who is said to be the culprit of a certain incident. He appears in the underground "Blood-Club" fight club and is one of the contestants.

=== Michiru Arisugawa ===
- Portrayed by Maon Kurosaki

Michiru Arisugawa (有栖川みちる, Arisugawa Michiru) is a character that appears in Blood-Club Dolls 1 and 2. She is the daughter of the Arisugawa family, and the only survivor of a certain incident, and suffers from amnesia, which she chases towards the truth. Michiru has some kind of connection between Sōen and Aiba.

== Elder Bairns ==
The Elder Bairns (also known as the Old Ones) are a demonic race that silently preys on humans and eats their flesh, whose feedings are under control by an ancient agreement called "Shrovetide". Many different appearances are shown throughout the series. Different Elder Bairns have different abilities and traits; Some can fly (Bat, Gryphon, Statue), some can manipulate prey/humans (Shadow, Train), and some have the ability to speak (Train, Samurai, Skeleton).

Multiple types of Elder Bairns appear within the series:

- Jizō: Appears in first episode of the anime. A statue that can levitate, and later reveals its two raptorial arms to move and make big leaps.
- Bat: Appears in the beginning of the first episode, flashback in the tenth episode, and the climax of The Last Dark film. Another bat-Elder Bairn appears during the beginning of the second episode, where its head resembles a dead animal and its claws resemble a tree branch.
- Flower: Appears near the end of the second episode of the anime. Underneath a giant flower bud, a set of teeth is revealed.
- Train: Appears in the third episode of the anime, where its sluggish body guises of a train to lure its prey. This is the first Elder Bairn to talk.
- Gryphon: Appears in the fourth episode of the anime. The bird-like creature has two other Elder Bairns under its control. The creature is the first to mention Shrovetide.
- Monk: Appears in the fifth episode, where it is mistaken as a regular monk, but has an anthropomorphic eyeball as its head.
- Centipede: Appears at the end of the fifth episode and beginning of the sixth episode of the anime. A large Crustacean with a bulky front, two arms, and a large mouth. The creature kills Nene.
- Shadow: Appears at the end of the sixth episode, where a shapeless creature that takes any form and kills anything standing in its way. The creature is known for killing townspeople in broad daylight, and its death also kills Nono.
- Samurai: A gigantic humanoid samurai with six arms that appears in the seventh episode.
- Spider: Appears at the end of the eighth, and beginning of the ninth episode.
- Skeleton: Appears in the tenth episode of the anime. It has a human head with long hair, and only a spinal cord below her neck. She kills Tokizane, and taunts Saya by alluding she feeds on worse things than herself.
- Cerberus: Appears at the end of the eleventh episode and twelfth episode. The cerberus uses its ears that are also two arms to kill Tokizane, Nene and Nono.
- Bunny: Appears at the end of the twelfth episode, where it multiplies and kills the latter townspeople.
- Giant: Appears at the climax of The Last Dark film.
