= Blood-Club Dolls 2 =

2020 film by Shutaro Oku

- Theatrical release poster
- Directed by: Shutaro Oku
- Screenplay by: Junichi Fujisaku; Shutaro Oku
- Based on: Blood-C by Production I.G and CLAMP
- Produced by: Sennosuke Okumura
- Starring: Ryūnosuke Matsumura; Ryō Kitazano; Kanon Miyahara; Keisuke Minami; Maon Kurosaki
- Cinematography: Akinaga Fujii
- Music by: Kōsuke Nishimoto
- Distributed by: NEGA; MOVIC
- Release date: July 11, 2020
- Running time: 75 minutes
- Country: Japan
- Language: Japanese

Blood-Club Dolls 2 (Note: Stylized as BLOOD-CLUB DOLLS 2) is a 2020 Japanese action horror film written and directed by Shutaro Oku with Junichi Fujisaku as a co-writer based on the 2011 anime television series Blood-C co-created by studio Production I.G and manga artist group CLAMP. Co-distributed by NEGA and MOVIC, Club Dolls 2 is the sequel to Blood-Club Dolls 1 (2018), and is also set before the events of Blood-C: The Last Dark anime film (2012), as Saya Kisaragi is continuing her pursuit to find Fumito Nanahara; in the universe Blood-C, humanity are secretly preyed upon a race called the Elder Bairns, (Note: 古きもの, Furukimono; lit. "The Old Ones/Ancient Ones") whose feeding is kept under control by an ancient agreement called Shrovetide. The film focuses on Sōen (who was introduced in Blood-C: The Last Mind stage play), and his underground fightclub called "Blood-Club". The film stars Ryūnosuke Matsumura, Ryō Kitazano, Keisuke Minami, and Maon Kurosaki with Kanon Miyahara as Saya. Club Dolls 2 was released in Japan on July 11, 2020.

The film marks the third live-action film adaptation for the Blood-C series, and a fourth for the Blood franchise since Blood: The Last Vampire (2009).

== Plot ==
The next day after the "Blood-Club" incident, Aiba remembers that he was hypnotized by Sōen and his men to kill off innocent people. As he is sedated with Elder Bairn blood, Saya barges in the room where he is held captive, and urges him to fight off Fumito's influences. Meanwhile, Sōen kidnaps Michiru to have her answer of her actions, and Fumito and his assistant Yūka disguises as café owners to keep Mana and Mito from reaching her brother.

The other contestants are held in a remote location, and are sedated by the Elder Bairn blood for combat purposes. They battle Aiba, but he still bests them in a sword combats. As Michiru demands Sōen why they are in Tokyo, Fumito shoots back of her head. Sōen grieves, but shocked as Michiru is revealed to be an Elder Bairn. Mito learns of Aiba's whereabouts, but Saya kills him, as Fumito had slipped an Elder Bairn blood in his drink. Saya later battles Aiba, with Fumito watching both in the distance.

== Cast ==
- Ryūnosuke Matsumura as Sōen, the mafia-boss who's running an underground fight club called "Blood-Club" in Tokyo. The character was first introduced in The Last Mind stage play.
- Ryō Kitazano as Aiba, a young man who went missing, later seen participating in "Blood-Club" underground event.
- Kanon Miyahara as Saya Kisaragi, a humanoid Elder Bairn that wears a sailor-suited school uniform with a katana that is currently hunting down Fumito in Tokyo. The character was first introduced in the anime series.
- Keisuke Minami as Fumito Nanahara, governor of Tokyo, and Saya's arch-nemesis. The character was first introduced in the anime series.
- Asami Yoshikawa as Yūka Amino, a woman who works with Fumito in order to gain political power. The character was first introduced in the anime series.
- Maon Kurosaki as Michiru Arisugawa, the daughter of the Arisugawa family.
- Tomohito Yashima as Detective Mito, a detective who's investigating "Blood-Club", and searching for Aiba.
- Aki Asakura as Mana, Aiba's little sister who is searching for her brother.

Other cast includes Takuya Kawahara as Melody, Judai Shirakashi as Kisanuki, Naoya Gomoto as Ginroku, Junji Shimizu as Higawa Mizunashi, Rie Sakurai as Yumi, Kō Hosokawa as Karajishi, Ren Yagami as Sogabe, Shōta Takasaki as Kōhan, Taishi Sugie as Reiji, Ryosei Tanaka as Kuroda, Yuya Asato as Sukegawa, Dai Hasegawa as Kada, and Yōji Tanaka as Kuzū. Takumi Kizu, Takeshi Maeda, Narushi Ikeda and Bernard Ackah also appear in an undisclosed roles.

== Production ==
=== Development ===
In February 2018, it was announced that Blood-C was receiving another live-action film adaptation with a new story. In August 2018, the website announced that Blood-Club Dolls is a two-part film project. The staff members such as director and screenwriter Shutaro Oku, and co-screenwriter Junichi Fujisaku resumed their roles from Blood-Club Dolls 1, while Sennosuke Okumura now acted as a sole producer, with Akinaga Fujii in charge of the cinematography.

=== Casting ===
The majority of the actors from The Last Mind stage play, Asura Girl and Blood-Club Dolls 1 returned, with Ryūnosuke Matsumura, Kanon Miyahara, Keisuke Minami, and Asami Yoshikawa reprising their respective roles as Sōen, Saya, Fumito Nanahara and Yūka Amino, with Ryō Kitazono and singer Maon Kurosaki as Aiba and Michiru Arisugawa respectively. Takumi Kizu, Narushi Ikeda, and martial artist Bernard Ackah was also cast for this film.

=== Filming ===
The principal photography was done back in 2018 while filming Blood-Club Dolls 1, and was filmed in various areas of Tokyo, Japan.

=== Music ===
Kōsuke Nishimoto composed the music for Blood-Club Dolls 2. Ryō Kitazano provided the theme song for the film, titled "Over the little night".

== Release ==
The film was released in Japanese theaters on July 11, 2020.
