= Saya Kisaragi =

Fictional character from the Blood-C anime television series

- Blood-C character
- Saya Kisaragi, as illustrated by CLAMP
- Created by: Production I.G and CLAMP
- Based on: Saya (Blood: The Last Vampire) by Production I.G
- Adapted by: Junichi Fujisaku; Nanase Ohkawa
- Designed by: CLAMP
- Portrayed by: Kanon Miyahara
- Voiced by: Nana Mizuki (Japanese); Alexis Tipton (English)

In-universe information
- Species: Elder Bairn
- Gender: Female
- Weapon: Katana
- Family: Tadayoshi Kisaragi (adoptive father)
- Nationality: Japanese

Saya Kisaragi (Japanese: 更衣 小夜, Hepburn: Kisaragi Saya) is the main protagonist of the Blood-C anime television series co-created by studio Production I.G and manga artist group CLAMP. Saya Kisaragi is first portrayed by her false life as an innocent and clumsy girl who acts as a shrine maiden at her father's shrine, going out at night to hunt Elder Bairns as part of sworn duty. In reality, she is an Elder Bairn who was raised by humans, and her personality is very stone cold and stoic.

Besides the anime series and the 2012 sequel anime film, Blood-C: The Last Dark, Saya Kisaragi made appearances in multiple related adaptations within the Blood-C universe.

Saya Kisaragi was designed by manga artist group CLAMP, who changed Saya's character overall from previous incarnations of the Blood franchise, with her last name being "Kisaragi" and not "Otonashi", and an appearance of a meganekko (眼鏡っ娘; lit. "glasses-wearing girl"). Director Tsutomu Mizushima, CLAMP's leader and series' lead writer Nanase Ohkawa handled her character with series supervisor Junichi Fujisaku. Saya Kisaragi is voiced by Nana Mizuki, and Alexis Tipton voices her in the English dub. Kanon Miyahara portrays her for the live-action appearances.

== Creation and design ==
When designing Saya Kisaragi for the anime series, director Tsutomu Mizushima wanted Saya to be portrayed as a gentle character and something different from previous incarnations of Saya in the Blood franchise. The only character trait that they kept for Saya Kisaragi was her name, and a katana (Note: Named the Sacred Sword (御神刀, Goshintō)) that she uses to defeat monsters, while the latter was changed: Her last name was "Kisaragi" opposed to "Otonashi", and physical appearance of a meganekko (眼鏡っ娘; lit. "glasses-wearing girl") with CLAMP's unique character designs. This was due to series supervisor Junichi Fujisaku wanting the viewers to distinguish the portrayal of this version and previous incarnations of Saya.

Both CLAMP member Nanase Ohkawa and series supervisor Junichi Fujisaku handled the anime series and sequel anime film's scripts. During the anime series, Ohkawa portrayed Saya as a normal girl that is a town's protector beginning to intrude this very life. Towards the end of the series as it broke conventions of a hero-focused anime to a twist to a lie, Ohkawa portrays Saya with more storic and cold personality like the previous incarnations, as she regained her true self. This comes true as they were developing the sequel anime film, while her core character hasn't changed from the anime series.

Saya's school outfit is also different from previous incarnations, as she sports a black and red uniform in both the anime and The Last Mind stage play. For latter majority of her appearances, she wears her blue sailor-suit school uniform similar to her first incarnation.

=== Casting ===
Nana Mizuki voices Saya Kisaragi in the animated appearances. In the 2011 anime series, Mizuki described Saya as she is portrayed in the anime as an easy-going girl who enjoys her school life and shares a strong bond with Tadayoshi. In the sequel anime film, Mizuki initially thought she would need to reimagine the entire character for her performance as Saya in the movie. It was later decided that the core character had changed little despite the events of the series finale, so Mizuki did not have to adjust her performance by much. Mizuki worked with the staff to help portray Saya's strained condition and deliberate isolation from others after the trauma of the series' events, although the sense of love still formed a strong part of Saya's character. In the English dub, Saya is voiced by Alexis Tipton.

For her live-action appearances, she is portrayed by Kanon Miyahara.

== Appearances ==
=== Anime appearances ===
==== Blood-C (2011) ====
In the events of the 2011 anime television series, Saya Kisaragi is living as a high school student and a shrine maiden with her father named Tadayoshi, and defends the town at night from the Elder Bairns. Her battle with the Elder Bairns becomes difficult as they accuse her and the humans violating a covenant called "Shrovetide", and starts attacking during the day. She also meets a talking dog, who is an owner of a shop that grants wishes, and is here in town to grant someone's wish. Near the end of the series, Kanako, her teacher and her thought-to-be-fallen friends, forces her to drink the blood of the Elder Bairn. She not only regains all of her memories, but learns the truth of Fumito Nanahara's experiment: The town was created as a feeding ground for Saya, and to see whether her "false memories" were to be altered so the oath can be broken. After Saya regains her old personality, she is forced to kill berserk Tadayoshi, who is actually an Elder Bairn-human hybrid. Fumito releases the Elder Bairns and causes a massacre on the entire town. Saya tries to stop Fumito, but she gets shot in the head. Recovering, the dog reveals that Saya made a wish to be herself. Determined, Saya sets off to pursuit Fumito.

==== Blood-C: The Last Dark (2012) ====
In the sequel anime film, Blood-C: The Last Dark, which act as a conclusion to the series, while arriving to Tokyo, Saya saves a girl named Mana Hīragi from a man that transformed into an Elder Bairn. Along the way, she encounters Kuroto Mogari and the internet rebel group called SIRRUT, where they're opposing Fumito's new youth ordinace bill. She joins them, as Kuroto makes a promise to help her find Fumito. After saving Mana again from Tsuji Private Academy ambush caused by Fumito, the two have a talk as Mana reveals she joined SIRRUT to find her missing father. Reaching Tower's headquarters, Fumito and Kuroto reveals that they've been working together to lure Saya, and the reason why Saya's blood has been collected numerous times is that it breaks the pact between the Elder Bairns and humans. After Fumito reveals that she killed Mana's father during her arrival to Tokyo, Saya battles him, who transformed into a giant-Elder Bairn with Kuroto. Fumito reveals that he experimented himself long ago to see if he can lift the curse from Saya. He kisses her and fades away, and she laments she's alone again. She does not return to SIRRUT, but is seen walking somewhere in a midst of a crowded street.

=== Live-action appearances ===
==== Blood-C: The Last Mind (2015) ====
In Blood-C: The Last Mind stage play, set shortly after the events of the twelfth episode of the anime, Saya, in an amnesic state, wakes up in a hospital in an unnamed town near Tokyo, by an unlicensed doctor named Haru, who reveals to be her fiancée. During her recovery, she meets Ran, a girl who hunts Elder Bairns. In the end, while both girls are rescuing Haru, Saya encounters Fumito again, who reveals that the town is another one of his experiment: Haru was cast as fake fiancée, Ran was the girl she killed in the long distant past. In order to save Haru from being turned into a full Elder Bairn from Fumito, she lets him escape, but leaving Haru with no memories of the event. She leaves her allies behind and continues her pursuit.

==== Asura Girl: Blood-C Another Story (2017) ====
In Asura Girl: Blood-C Another Story, which takes place in a pre-World War II era, Saya arrives at a small village near Tokyo City, and saves a boy named Ren from the Special Political Police force in the woods. He offers her hospitality, and she tells him about herself and the Elder Bairns. Saya meets Ren's sister, Ran, who has a rare blood disease. She discuss with her companion, Tadayoshi about Ran, whom he fears something bad will happen to her. When Ran goes berserk, Saya pleads her to regain her senses, but after brutal sword fight, she kills Ran. After killing Ren, she expresses her regret to Tadayoshi that she couldn't save the townspeople and the siblings.

==== Blood-Club Dolls (2018, 2020) ====
In both Blood-Club Dolls 1 and Blood-Club Dolls 2, taking place few days before the events of The Last Dark film, Saya is still on a pursuit in finding Fumito. As she takes her first step to Tokyo, she finds and participates in the underground fightclub called "Blood-Club", led by Fumito's former bodyguard, Sōen.

=== In other media ===
In the novelizations of the anime and the sequel film (written by Junichi Fujisaku), it was expanded that Saya was an Elder Bairn that was abandoned by her own kind and was raised by humans. Due to her humanoid appearance, as an infant, she drank human breast milk instead of blood.

In the audio drama, "Hot Summer Day" (written by Junichi Fujisaku, and character voiced by Nana Mizuki), when the main cast first arrives on Ukishima, they encounter Saya, who's chained up and angry towards Fumito. Few days later, Itsuki later meets Saya again, now as "Saya Kisaragi" in her false persona and memories, whom greets him and they'll see each other again at school.

In the direct manga adaptation of the anime and the sequel film (written and illustrated by Ranmaru Kotone), Saya Kisaragi has the same personality and storyline from both the twelve-episode anime series and The Last Dark film, with the only difference is that her gunshot wound from Fumito heals much later.

In Blood-C: Demonic Moonlight prequel manga (written and illustrated by Ryō Haduki), set in 1946, Saya is seen with an American officer named Lucy, who act has her handler, and appears multiple occasions to Kagekiri and David. It is revealed that Saya existed since the beginning of time, as she protected humans from her own kind. As time went on, she was shunned by the people that she protected, and buried herself in an empty coffin until Lucy woke her up. After finding out Lucy and Tower's scheme, she turns berserk and tries to kill them, but Mahito Nanahara uses his magic to both implant her with false memories, and seals her desire to kill humans. She lives a peaceful life for a century, until she is captured and brainwashed by Mahito's grandson, Fumito and renames her "Saya Kisaragi".

== Reception ==
The fans and audience's reception of Saya Kisaragi during the 2011 anime series was mostly negative, as how different this incarnation of Saya was compared other incarnations in the Blood franchise. However, Bradley Meek of THEM Anime Reviews praised Saya's fighting skills, and wrote "Saya is an agile fighter, instantly shedding her bumbling schoolgirl persona; becoming as we knew her in the OVA: a quick, smart, and merciless hunteress.". Kotaku gave a mixed review, as they praised CLAMP's design and Saya's appearance, they critiqued Saya's false sense of security. Comic Book Resources said that Saya could not live up the popularity of her predecessors due to simplicity of her premise of fighting monsters on a weekly schedule while her false identity ruins her character as the staff rushes it in favor of creating violent scenes for the final episodes rather than develop the protagonist comparing it to The Truman Show. On the other hand, Capsule Monster praised the premise of the series due to how aggressive is Saya in combat as well as when questioning her own world due to the twist shown in final episodes.

However, her characterization in The Last Dark was given a positive response. Aiden Foote of THEM Anime Review said "Saya herself is a bit different from the character we knew from Blood-C, i.e. more like the character we know from the rest of the franchise, and I was worried that the stony faced, cold-blooded, revenge thirsty routine would get a bit tiresome. Happily, the character development kicks in before that happens and she becomes fairly well-rounded and sympathetic by the end of it.". UK Anime Network enjoyed Saya's characterization in the movie as well as how she manages to live up the popularity of the original Saya from Blood: The Last Vampire in scene that serves as an homage. Anime News Network claims that the film managed to change the issues from the television series by turning Saya into the fierce fighter who appeared only in the opening sequence of such series. However, her rivalry with Fumito was felt lacking by the reviewer. Anime Super Hero also felt the Saya and Fumito's rivalry had issues as the protagonists share few scenes to the point Fumito looked like he was only waiting to be murdered in a film that completely centered on Saya's revenge. Kotaku also criticized her apparent romantic relationship Mana for having poor chemistry and that the morals of the Saya's not killing humans are not properly executed due to her revenge quest against Fumito.

There was also commentary on Saya's voice actresses. Alexis Tipton was praised by Capsule Monsters for her deliveries as Saya with Anime News Network finding her superior to the Japanese actress, Nana Mizuki; Anime News Network felt that Tipton sounded less overheaded than Mizuki. For the film, Mizuki's portrayal as Saya was also praised for her darker personality by UK Anime Network.

== See also ==
- List of female action heroes and villains
