= Asura Girl: Blood-C Another Story =

2017 film by Shutaro Oku

- Japanese: 阿修羅少女〜BLOOD-C異聞〜
- Revised Hepburn: Ashura Shojō: Buraddo-Shī Ibun
- Directed by: Shutaro Oku
- Screenplay by: Junichi Fujisaku
- Based on: Blood-C by Production I.G and CLAMP
- Produced by: Sennosuke Okumura
- Starring: Kaede Aono; Ryūnosuke Matsumura; Arata Furuta; Kanon Miyahara; Eiji Takigawa
- Narrated by: Kaito Ishikawa
- Cinematography: Masayuki Yonoha
- Music by: Kentarō Nakao
- Distributed by: NEGA
- Release date: August 26, 2017
- Running time: 90 minutes
- Country: Japan
- Language: Japanese

Asura Girl: Blood-C Another Story (Japanese: 阿修羅少女〜BLOOD-C異聞〜, Hepburn: Ashura Shojō: Buraddo-Shī Ibun) (Note: Also referred to as Asura Girl (Japanese: アシュラガール, Hepburn: Ashura Gāru)) is a 2017 Japanese action horror film directed by Shutaro Oku and written by Junichi Fujisaku based on the 2011 anime television series Blood-C, co-created by studio Production I.G and manga artist group CLAMP. Distributed by NEGA, Asura Girl is set in the pre-World War II era before the events of Blood-C; in the universe Blood-C, humanity is secretly preyed upon by a race called the Elder Bairns, (Note: 古きもの, Furukimono; lit. "The Old Things/Ancient Ones") whose feeding is kept under control by an ancient agreement called Shrovetide. Asura Girl follows the backstory for Ran (who was introduced in 2015's Blood-C: The Last Mind stage play), and a bloody conflict between a small village and Special Political Police force. The film stars Kaede Aono as Ran, with Kanon Miyahara as Saya Kisaragi, alongside Ryūnosuke Matsumura, Arata Furuta and Eiji Takigawa. Asura Girl was released in Japan on August 26, 2017.

The film marks the first live-action film adaptation for Blood-C series, and the second live-action film adaptation for the Blood franchise, following Blood: The Last Vampire (2009).

== Plot ==
In a pre-World War II era, a Special Political Police is investigating the mysterious death of one of their captains that happened within a peaceful remote village near Tokyo. Meanwhile, one of the villagers named Ren is taking care of his sister Ran in a hospital, who is suffering from a rare blood disease. Both siblings longs to explore the world outside of the village once the sickness is healed.

A girl in a sailor-suited school uniform with a katana named Saya, who is taking orders from a man named Tadayoshi, arrives at the village. Ren invites Saya his hospitality, after saving him from few of the police forces in the woods. During her stay, Ren learns from Saya and the villagers about the existence of the Elder Bairns, the ancient creatures that stalk up on humans and feed on their blood. Ran wanders into the woods alone, and one of the policemen named Akayama tries to have an intimate moment with her, but her eyes turn red, bites his neck and runs off. While running from pain, Akayama turns into a blood thirsty Elder Bairn. He arrives at the headquarters and tries kill his fellow policemen, but is killed by the deputy chief. Moments later in the woods, Ren finds his sister feeding on one of the villagers.

Few days later, Ran's condition worsens, and Ren allows her sister to feed on his blood. Amakatsu, the deputy chief of the SPP, reaching his decision, orders his men to kill off the villagers that night, accusing all of them as monsters. During the conflict, Ran, who is now a full Elder Bairn in human form, kills all of the police force, including Amakatsu with a katana. Saya arrives and pleads Ran to regain her senses, but the two faces off with each other, and she ends up killing Ran. While grieving his dead sister, Ren slowly transitions into an Elder Bairn, as the blood within him boils within him. He pleads Saya to kill him during his transition, and she does. As both Saya and Tadayoshi are about to leave, she expresses her regrets to him that she couldn't save all of the villagers.

Moments later, at the hospital, one of the doctors, Mokuren, reveals to her colleague that she has been experimenting with her patients for six years by turning them into Elder Bairns, but they all died shortly after. However, Ran, one of her patient, was a successful test subject as she completed her transformation into a humanoid Elder Bairn. Moments later, Fumito Nanahara arrives on a boat with Yūka Amino and few of his men to burn the village to the ground, erasing any trace of evidence of the events and escapes. As the fire consumes the village, Ran rises from the dead with a stone cold look in her eyes.

== Cast ==
- Kaede Aono as Ran, a village girl who is hospitalized, due to her rare-blood disease. The character was first introduced in The Last Mind stage play. When returning to her role as Ran, Aono was surprised that her character was the main lead, opposed to Saya, who have been the main lead in every entry in the Blood franchise.
- Ryūnosuke Matsumura as Ren, a village boy and Ran's brother.
- Kanon Miyahara as Saya Kisaragi, a humanoid Elder Bairn girl in a sailor-suited school uniform that hunts her own kin. The character was first introduced in the anime series.
- Eiji Takigawa as Tadayoshi Kisaragi, Saya's mentor. The character was first introduced in the anime series.
- Arata Furuta as Amakatsu, deputy chief of the Special Political Police.
- Naoya Gomoto as Akayama, one of the Special Political Policemen.
- Miki Mizuno as Mokuren, the doctor that works at Ran's hospital.

Other cast includes Guin Poon Chaw as Naichō, Takashi Yuki as Hirada, Mashu Ishiwatari as Yō, Takeshi Nakayama as Furuya, Judai Shirakashi as Commander, Kodai Miyahi as Okita, Kaname Kohakura as Satake, Yoji Tanaka as Takiji, Keisuke Minami as Fumito Nanahara, and Asami Yoshikawa as Yūka Amino.

== Production ==
=== Development ===
In January 2017, it was announced that a live-action film adaptation for Blood-C was in the works, with a brand new story that acted as a prequel to the series. Shutaro Oku from Nega Design Works directed the film at NEGA, who also directed Blood-C: The Last Mind stage play (2015). Junichi Fujisaku, who directed 2005's Blood+ anime series, supervised and co-wrote the scripts for the twelve episode anime series and The Last Dark anime film, returned as a screenwriter for the film after providing the script for The Last Mind. Kentarō Nakao composed the music for the film, and Sennosuke Okumura from The Last Mind stage play returned to produce the film.

=== Casting ===
Majority of the cast from Blood-C: The Last Mind stage play returned to Asura Girl to play different characters, while Kaede Aono, Kanon Miyahara, Eiji Takigawa, Keisuke Minami, and Asami Yoshikawa reprised their respective roles as Ran, Saya Kisaragi, Tadayoshi Kisaragi, Fumito Nanahara and Yūka Amino. Arata Furuta and Naoya Gomoto joined the cast as Amakatsu and Akayama respectively. Kaito Ishikawa was announced as a narrator for the film.

=== Filming ===
Kaede Aono, the lead actress of the film, confirmed that the principal photography took place from June to December 2016.

== Release ==
The film was released in theaters in Japan on August 26, 2017.
