= Adam Kendall =

Adam Kendall may refer to:

- Adam Kendall, member of Neurosis (band)
- Adam Kendall, character on Little House on the Prairie (TV series)
- Adam Kendall, character on Friday Night Lights, played by Chris Burnett (actor)
