= Kazuchika Kise =

Japanese director & animator

- 黄瀬和哉
- Born: March 6, 1965 (age 61); Osaka, Japan
- Occupations: Director, animator, and character designer
- Years active: 1989–present
- Employer: Production I.G
- Known for: Blood-C; Ghost in the Shell: Arise; Made in Abyss

Kazuchika Kise (Japanese: 黄瀬和哉, Hepburn: Kise Kazuchika; born March 6, 1965) is a Japanese director, animator, and character designer. He started working in the anime industry in 1989 with Patlabor: The Movie. In 2015, he made his directorial debut with Ghost in the Shell: Arise.

== Biography ==
Kazuchika Kise was born in Osaka on March 6, 1965. After graduating from High School, he joined AnimeR and studied under Hiromi Muranaka. Later, he joined Production I.G and was involved in his first project, Patlabor: The Movie. Following the film's release, Kise continued to work with Production I.G and started directing series with Ghost in the Shell: Arise in 2013.

In 2013, Kise did the character designs with Clamp for Blood-C, which won the Reaper Award for best animation that year. In 2018, Kise designed the characters for Made in Abyss, which won anime of the year at the Crunchyroll Anime Awards in the same year.

== Works ==
=== TV series ===
- Blue Seed (1994–1998) (character designer)
- Otogi Zoshi (2004–2005) (character designer)
- xxxHolic (2006–2008) (character designer)
- Blood-C (2011) (character designer with Clamp)
- Ghost in the Shell: Arise (2013–2015) (director)
- Made in Abyss (2017–present) (character designer)
- Platinum End (2021–2022) (second part director)

=== Films ===
- Blood: The Last Vampire (2000) (animation director)
- Blood-C: The Last Dark (2011) (character designer with Clamp)
- Ghost in the Shell: The New Movie (2015) (character designer)
- Fate/Grand Order - Divine Realm of the Round Table: Camelot (2020–2021) (character designer)

=== Original video animation ===
- The Heroic Legend of Arslan (1991) (animation director)
- Combustible Campus Guardress (1994) (character designer)
