= Shutaro Oku =

Japanese director born in 1975

- 奥 秀太郎
- Born: 1975 (age 50–51); Tokyo, Japan
- Occupations: Film director, Stage director

Shutaro Oku (Japanese: 奥 秀太郎, Hepburn: Oku Shūtarō; born in 1975) is a Japanese film and stage director.

== Biography ==
Shutaro Oku was born in 1975 in Tokyo, Japan. From 2000 to 2009, Oku directed many theatrical films, notably The Labor Cop, Japanese Naked Tribe, Aka-sen, Cain's Descendant, and USB. He also participated stage productions as visual planner, like Elisabeth and MOZART! for TOHO Musical, The Bee and Egg for NODA MAP productions, 1789, Casablanca for the Takarazuka Revue, and more.

In 2015, Oku directed the stage play based on 2011 anime series Blood-C, titled Blood-C: The Last Mind. That same year, he directed the stage play of Ghost in the Shell, titled Ghost in the Shell: Ghost is Alive.

In 2017, Oku directed the first live-action film adaptation for Blood-C, titled Asura Girl: Blood-C Another Story. Oku later returned to direct the two live-action films for Blood-C, Blood-Club Dolls 1 and Blood-Club Dolls 2. He also co-wrote the screenplay with Junichi Fujisaku.

In November 2019, Oku directed Battles Without Honor and Humanity: On'na-tachi no Shitō-hen, a stage adaptation of the Battles Without Honor and Humanity yakuza film series starring members of the female pop idol group AKB48.

== Works ==
=== Film ===
Year	Title	Credit	Note
2000	KAI-ON	Director	
2002	The Labor Cop	Director	
2003	Japanese Naked Tribe	Director	
2004	AKA-SEN	Director	
2006	Cain's Descendant	Director	
2007	Death of Domomata	Director	
2009	USB	Director	
2014	Typhoon Family	Director	
2014	SEIZA	Director	
2017	Asura Girl: Blood-C Another Story	Director	
2018	Blood-Club Dolls 1	Director, Screenplay	Co-written with Junichi Fujisaku
2020	Blood-Club Dolls 2	Director, Screenplay	Co-written with Junichi Fujisaku

=== Stage ===
Year	Title	Credit	Note
2005	Tap Man	Director	
2006	Tap Man × Piano Man	Director	
2006	Boys Electone Conspiracy	Director	
2006	Tap man × Piano Man × Movie Man	Director	
2007	Hibiki Inamoto + Souun Takeda Live	Director	
2008	Yoshida Brothers Live 2008 Yu-Shun	Director	
2008	Kuroneko	Director	
2010	Red Shoes	Director	
2010	Kimidori	Director	
2010	Freaks	Director	
2011	South Of Heaven	Director	
2011	Byakuya	Director	
2011	Silver Spoon	Director	
2012	Persona 4 the EVOLUTION	Director	
2013	Constellation	Director	
2014	Persona 4 Arena	Director	
2015	Blood-C: The Last Mind	Director	
2015	Ghost in the Shell ～GHOST is ALIVE～	Director	
2016	TERROR IN RESONANCE	Director	
2016	Persona 4 Arena Ultimax	Director	
2017	The Legend of Heroes: Trails of Cold Steel	Director	
2017	Spectacle 3DNŌ Heike story「Kumano」「Funabenkei」	Director	
2019	Battles Without Honor and Humanity: On'na-tachi no Shitō-hen	Director	
