= Kamen Rider Amazons the Movie: The Last Judgement =

- Kanji: 仮面ライダーアマゾンズ THE MOVIE 最後ノ審判
- Revised Hepburn: Kamen Raidā Amazonzu Za Mūbī Saigo no Shinpan
- Directed by: Hidenori Ishida
- Written by: Yuya Takahashi; Yasuko Kobayashi (Plot Supervision)
- Starring: Tom Fujita; Masashi Taniguchi; Rena Takeda; Ayu Higashi; Kota Miura; Mitsutoshi Shundo; Yoshito Momiki; Kazuya Tanabe; Kanon Miyahara; Katsuya; Nobuo Kyo; Seina Kokufuda; Yuu Kamio; Takako Katou; Takashi Fujiki
- Music by: Kuniaki Haishima
- Production companies: Toei Company; TV Asahi; Toei Video; Toei Agency; Bandai
- Distributed by: Toei Company
- Release date: May 19, 2018
- Running time: 101 Minutes
- Country: Japan
- Language: Japanese

Kamen Rider Amazons the Movie: The Last Judgement (仮面ライダーアマゾンズ THE MOVIE 最後ノ審判, Kamen Raidā Amazonzu Za Mūbī Saigo no Shinpan) is a film set to conclude the story of Kamen Rider Amazons, which aired on Amazon Prime over two seasons in 2016 and 2017. It was released in the Japanese theaters on May 19, 2018.

It was announced in a teaser shown following the premiere of Kamen Rider Heisei Generations Final: Build & Ex-Aid with Legend Rider. A teaser trailer was shown during the broadcast of 20th episode of Kamen Rider Build. The first official trailer was released on March 3, 2018.

== Plot ==
After two years on the run, Haruka Mizusawa / Kamen Rider Amazon Omega is cornered by a Competitive Creatures Control Center (4C) squad led by Takeshi Kurosaki. Mizuki Mizusawa, a member of 4C and Haruka’s estranged foster sister, intervenes before he can be killed. The pair escapes into a nearby lake.

Haruka and Mizuki are found by a group of orphans and taken to their orphanage; The orphan Muku tends to Mizuki’s wounds. Haruka meets orphanage director Einosuke Mido, who offers him a permanent home but warns him of an off-limits room in the facility. Within the off-limits room, the orphans offer their blood to a chained-up man.

As Mido and the children see off a newly-adopted orphan, a group of Amazons attacks the orphanage. Haruka transforms and fights them, and is shocked to see Mido fight alongside him as a mechanical Amazon Rider. The 4C squad finds the pair and attempts to kill them, but they are saved by the former members of the original Amazon Extermination Team. The Extermination Team reveals themselves to have been sent by Haruka and Mizuki’s mother, Reika. Not wanting to endanger the orphanage, Haruka and Mizuki depart with the team.

Haruka crosses paths with the couple that had adopted an orphan, and discovers that they have killed and eaten her - the orphanage is in reality a farm where Amazons are being raised as livestock. He attempts to warn the children, but discovers they’re aware of their purpose. Enraged, Haruka enters the off-limits room and discovers they had been farming Amazon cells from his rival, Jin Takayama / Kamen Rider Amazon Alpha.

The original Extermination Team comes across a group of runaways from the orphanage living in an abandoned home. The children attempt to eat the Team, but are dissuaded by stories of their former Amazon teammates Haruka and Mamoru; As they prepare to take the children to safety, however, 4C attacks and causes the Amazons to become hostile. The Extermination Team is forced to help kill the runaways.

Yugo Tachibana, 4C’s chief, convinces a politician to adopt and eat Muku in an attempt to gather support for the Amazon Livestock Project. Muku, who had previously welcomed her status as livestock, regains her will to live and kills everyone in the restaurant except Tachibana. Haruka arrives and consoles Muku, convincing her to live for herself. The two return to the orphanage and convince the children to escape. Angered, Mido begins killing the children; Haruka and Muku attempt to oppose him, but are overpowered.

Takayama tricks an orphan into freeing him, and prepares to kill the remaining children himself. Haruka tries to stop him, but is severely wounded. Muku, herself on the verge of death, asks Haruka to heal himself by eating her. Meanwhile, Takayama murders Mido as revenge for his imprisonment. Haruka stops Takayama from killing the remaining children and criticizes his obsession with killing Amazons in place of protecting lives. The pair clash, and Haruka kills Takayama.

Haruka, guilty for having eaten Muku, attempts suicide by drowning. A vision of Mizuki, however, convinces him to live on as a protector. Meanwhile, the Extermination Team and Reika inform Kurosaki of the Amazon Livestock Project. Reika and Kurosaki prepare to remove Tachibana from 4C.

Mizuki takes over as director of the orphanage and cares for the surviving children, waiting for Haruka to return. Haruka looks at her through the window and departs.

== Cast ==
- Haruka Mizusawa (水澤 悠, Mizusawa Haruka) Tom Fujita (藤田 富, Fujita Tomu)
- Jin Takayama (鷹山 仁, Takayama Jin): Masashi Taniguchi (谷口 賢志, Taniguchi Masashi)
- Mizuki Mizusawa (水澤 美月, Mizusawa Mizuki): Rena Takeda (武田 玲奈, Takeda Rena)
- Nanaha Izumi (泉 七羽, Izumi Nanaha): Ayu Higashi (東 亜優, Higashi Ayu)
- Takeshi Kurosaki (黒崎 武, Kurosaki Takeshi): Kota Miura (三浦 孝太, Miura Kōta)
- Makoto Shido (志藤 真, Shidō Makoto): Mitsutoshi Shundo (俊藤 光利, Shundō Mitsutoshi)
- Ichiro Fudamori (札森 一郎, Fudamori Ichirō): Yoshito Momiki (籾木 芳仁, Momiki Yoshito)
- Kota Fukuda (福田 耕太, Fukuda Kōta): Kazuya Tanabe (田邊 和也, Tanabe Kazuya)
- Nozomi Takai (高井 望, Takai Nozomi): Kanon Miyahara (宮原 華音, Miyahara Kanon)
- Kazuya Misaki (三崎 一也, Misaki Kazuya): Katsuya (勝也)
- Einosuke Mido (御堂 英之助, Midō Einosuke): Nobuo Kyo (姜 暢雄, Kyō Nobuo)
- Muku (ムク): Seina Kokufuda (国府田 聖那, Kokufuda Seina)
- Itsumi (イツミ): Rion Okamoto (岡本 莉音, Okamoto Rion)
- Goro (ゴロウ, Gorō): Yumeto Okuda (奥田 夢叶, Okuda Yumeto)
- Haichi (ハイチ): Toma Onishi (大西 統眞, Ōnishi Tōma)
- Shinsaku Sakoshima (佐古島 晋作, Sakoshima Shinsaku): Nobuo Shimazaki (嶋崎 伸夫, Shimazaki Nobuo)
- Mina (ミナ): Tsukushi Suzuki (鈴木 つく詩, Suzuki Tsukushi)
- Sango (サンゴ): Haruhi Kawano (かわの はるひ, Kawano Haruhi)
- Yoji (ヨージ, Yōji): Takeru Hayashi (林 タケル, Hayashi Takeru)
- Yugo Tachibana (橘 雄悟, Tachibana Yūgo): Yuu Kamio (神尾 佑, Kamio Yū)
- Reika Mizusawa (水澤 令華, Mizusawa Reika): Takako Katou (加藤 貴子, Katō Takako)
- Takaaki Tenjo (天条 隆顕, Tenjō Takaaki): Takashi Fujiki (藤木 孝, Fujiki Takashi)

== Theme song ==
- "EAT, KILL ALL"
  - Lyrics: Mike Sugiyama (マイクスギヤマ, Maiku Sugiyama)
  - Composition: Nobuo Yamada (山田 信夫, Yamada Nobuo)
  - Arrangement: Project.R (Tetsuya Takahashi (高橋 哲也, Takahashi Tetsuya), Shogo Ohnishi (大西 省吾, Ōnishi Shōgo))
  - Artist: Project.R (Taro Kobayashi (小林 太郎, Kobayashi Tarō), NoB)
