= Eiji Takigawa =

Japanese actor, singer, and entertainer

- Born: 24 March 1979 (age 47); Hirakata, Osaka Prefecture, Japan
- Occupation: Actor
- Years active: 2002–2020

Eiji Takigawa (滝川 英治, Takigawa Eiji) is a Japanese former actor. Hailed from Osaka, Takigawa graduated from the law department of Kounan Daigaku (Konan University) at Kobe, before he pursued his career in the entertainment industry.

During the filming of Yowamushi Pedal 2 in 2017, Takigawa was involved in a biking accident that resulted in a spinal cord injury that left him paralyzed from the waist down. On March 9, 2020, he announced his retirement from the entertainment industry.

== Career ==
He made his first big break on 2002, as the official icon of the energy drink, Lipovitan D, along with long-time icon, Kane Kosugi, the son of the legendary martial art actor, Sho Kosugi. The company which produces LipoD felt that Takigawa offered the right aspects for the younger target market for the drink: passion, determination, cheerfulness, youth and intelligence.

He graduated as the Lipovitan D icon on 29 March 2007.

=== As Kunimitsu Tezuka in the Prince of Tennis musicals ===
Takigawa is probably best known for originating the role of Kunimitsu Tezuka, the stoic captain of the Seigaku Middle School's tennis club, in the Prince of Tennis musical series, Tenimyu, as part of the first generation Seigaku cast. He first appeared in the series in 2003, and ended on the graduation show, Side Fudomine, in the beginning of 2005. He did not appear in the More Than Limit St. Rudolph Gakuen musical as he was in America at the time, and actor Kengo Ohkuchi filled in as Tezuka for the show.

Since his graduation, the role of Tezuka has been played by Yuu Shirota, Keisuke Minami, Daisuke Watanabe, and by Ryoma Baba.

Takigawa reprised his role as Tezuka and reunited with the first Seigaku cast to perform in Tenimyu's Dream Live 7th to celebrate the end of Tenimyu's first season.

=== Other work ===
Takigawa released a DVD called Treasure of Age (and some sites also call it as 'Treasure of Eiji') on 2004, which was produced by Marvelous Entertainment.

He reunited with Tenimyu castmates Kimeru, Sota Aoyama, and Naoya Gomoto to appear in the PV of Kimeru's single, TIMELESS, on 4 October 2006. The PV is only on the Type A Limited Edition of the single. There's also a short movie, TIMELESS ~The Movie, that was released on DVD on 18 November 2006.

On TeniMyu Supporters DVD vol. 5 that was released on 28 April 2007, Takigawa appeared along with his first generation Seigaku castmates. He then went on to play the role of Hidemi Tsukamoto on the live-action movie adaptation of the manga series Fujoshi Rumi by Natsumi Konjo.

On 27 January 2008, Takigawa took on the part of Riki in Kamen Rider Kiva, the human form of Dogga, the Frankenstein's monster that assists Kiva in fighting the enemies. Since 1 April 2008, Takigawa's career is being managed by Shochiku Entertainment, the talent, stage-play, and actors' subsidiary of Shochiku.

He participated in the Opening Ceremony of the 2020 Paralympic Games in Tokyo on August 24, 2021.

== Injury ==
On September 20, 2017, Eiji had an accident while filming the second season of the live-action drama adaptation of the manga Yowamushi Pedal. He lost control of his bicycle during filming and hit a curb on the road which sent him flying off his bike. The crash resulted in a severe spinal injury and Eiji was rushed to the hospital by helicopter.

== Filmography ==
=== Film ===
- Fujoshi Rumi – Hidemi Tsukamoto (2007)
- Kamen Rider Kiva: King of the Castle in the Demon World – Riki / Dogga (2008)
- Cho Kamen Rider Den-O & Decade Neo Generations: The Onigashima Warship – Riki / Dogga (2009)
- Asura Girl: Blood-C Another Story – Kisaragi Tadayoshi (2017)
- The Blood of Wolves – Katsushi Mori (2018)

=== Television ===
- Kamen Rider Kiva – Riki (2008–2009)
- Yowamushi Pedal Live Action – Juichi Fukutomi (2016)

== Stage work ==
=== Musicals ===
Tenimyu: The Prince of Tennis Musical series (as Kunimitsu Tezuka)

- The Prince of Tennis Musical (2003)
- The Prince of Tennis Musical: Remarkable 1st Match Fudomine – Ryoma Echizen (2003–2004)
- The Prince of Tennis Musical: Dream Live 1st (2004)
- The Prince of Tennis Musical: Side Fudomine ~Special Match~ (In Winter of 2004–2005)
- The Prince of Tennis Musical: Dream Live 7th (2010)
