= Blood-C =

2011 Japanese anime television series

- Key art, featuring Saya Kisaragi.
- Type: Anime television series
- Genre: Action; Dark fantasy; Thriller
- Created by: Production I.G and CLAMP
- Directed by: Tsutomu Mizushima
- Series composition: Nanase Ohkawa
- Character designers: CLAMP (original); Kazuchika Kise
- Music by: Naoki Satō
- Country of origin: Japan
- Original language: Japanese
- No. of episodes: 12 (list of episodes)

Production
- Art director: Hiromasa Ogura
- Sound director: Yoshikazu Iwanami
- Cinematographer: Eiji Arai
- Color designer: Narumi Sakai
- CG director: Noriko Tsukamoto
- Editor: Junichi Uematsu
- Animation producer: Yuma Ōue
- Studios: Production I.G
- Executive producers: Hiroyuki Shimizu; Katsuji Morishita; Seiji Takeda; Takeshi Yasuda; Tetsuya Endo; Yoshirō Kataoka
- Producers: Hiroo Maruyama; Tooru Kawaguchi; Makoto Furukawa; Ikuko Enomoto; Kyōko Uryū; Motohisa Katō
- Production companies: Project BLOOD-C TV (Note: Production committee consists of Production I.G, Aniplex, Kadokawa Shoten, Dentsu, Dwango and MBS)

Original release
- Networks: MBS, TBS, CBC, RKK, Wowow
- Release: July 8 – September 30, 2011

Related
- Manga
- Written by: Ranmaru Kotone
- Published by: Kadokawa Shoten
- Magazine: Monthly Shōnen Ace
- Original run: 2011 – 2012
- Volumes: 4
- Manga

Blood-C: Demonic Moonlight
- Written by: Ryo Haduki
- Published by: Kadokawa Shoten
- Magazine: Newtype Ace
- Original run: 2011 – 2012
- Volumes: 2
- Novel
- Written by: Junichi Fujisaku
- Published by: Kadokawa Shoten
- Published: October 4, 2011 (Blood-C); June 2, 2012 (Blood-C: The Last Dark)
- Anime film
- Blood-C: The Last Dark (2012)
- Stage play
- Blood-C: The Last Mind (2015)
- Live-action films
- Asura Girl: Blood-C Another Story (2017); Blood-Club Dolls 1 (2018); Blood-Club Dolls 2 (2020)
- Related
- Blood: The Last Vampire (2000 anime film); Blood+ (2005–2006 anime series); Blood: The Last Vampire (2009 live-action film)

Blood-C (stylized in all caps) is a 2011 Japanese anime television series co-created by studio Production I.G and manga artist group CLAMP. Directed by Tsutomu Mizushima, written by Nanase Ohkawa, character designed by Kazuchika Kise from an original character concept by CLAMP and music composed by Naoki Satō, it is the second anime series in the Blood franchise following Blood+ (2005–2006). Blood-C focuses on Saya Kisaragi, an outwardly normal teenage high school girl who serves as a shrine maiden to a country town; in reality, she is a skilled swordswoman charged by her father to defeat Elder Bairns, monsters who feed on human blood. As her battles grow more desperate and more people she cares for fall victim to the Elder Bairns, Saya begins finding faults in her reality, and eventually uncovers a disturbing truth about herself, the town and her surviving friends. It aired on MBS and other networks between July 8 and September 30, 2011.

Blood-C was designed to share only thematic similarities with earlier Blood projects. CLAMP was brought on board to both design the characters and help create the scenario. It featured several new elements to the Blood franchise, such as being primarily set within a high school environment. The Elder Bairns were inspired by the Great Old Ones from H. P. Lovecraft's Cthulhu Mythos, and modeled after traditional Japanese monsters. Its bloody violence, a stylistic choice following the series' themes, resulted in censorship in Japan and eventual blacklisting in China. The series has received mixed to positive reviews from journalists. A sequel film, Blood-C: The Last Dark released in Japan on June 2, 2012. Blood-C became its own franchise, with two manga, a 2011 novelization, a 2015 stage play, and three live-action films.

== Plot ==
Blood-C is set in an isolated rural town on the shore of Lake Suwa in Nagano Prefecture. Saya Kisaragi is a shrine maiden of the Shinto shrine run by her father Tadayoshi, and is outwardly a friendly and clumsy high school girl. Her circle of friends include neighbor and cafe owner Fumito Nanahara; school friends Yūka Amino, identical twins Nene and Nono Motoe, class president Itsuki Tomofusa, the taciturn Shinichirō Tokizane; and Saya's schoolroom teacher Kanako Tsutsutori.

While living a normal school life by day, Saya spends the night defending the village against Elder Bairns, (Note: Furukimono (古きもの; lit. "Old Things", also called "Ancient Ones")) monsters who feed on humans. Saya's skills in the "art of the sword" enable her to defeat the Elder Bairns, but those capable of speech accuse Saya and the humans of violating a covenant dubbed "Shrovetide". Saya also encounters a talking dog, which says it is here to grant someone's wish. She suffers from blanks in her memory and is pained by headaches whenever she tries to remember.

Saya's battles with the Elder Bairns become increasingly desperate as they begin attacking during the day. Both Nene and Nono are killed, leaving Saya deeply hurt. Shinichirō learns of Saya's burden and offers to help, but is later killed himself. An attack on Saya's school results in everyone but Saya, Itsuki and Kanako dying. Saya later realizes that only her class was present at the school. Due to the blanks in her memory and comments from the Elder Bairns, she begins questioning her identity and mission.

Kanako asks Saya to see Tadayoshi's library, which contains information on the Elder Bairns. They find that the library is a fake. Kanako confronts Saya with the living Nono, Nene and Shinichirō before forcing her to drink Elder Bairn blood. It is revealed that the town's entire population, including those close to Saya, were actors in an experiment organized by Fumito, and that Saya is actually an Elder Bairn in human form. She had sworn an oath not to kill humans and in turn hunted her own kind, but Fumito captured her and implanted her with false memories of a past "human life," with the goal of seeing whether her inner self could be altered so the oath could be broken. Whenever Saya began relapsing and remembering her past, Fumito used drugs and hypnosis to make her docile again, and all the Elder Bairns she faced were controlled by Fumito using her blood. Kanako had wanted to use Saya to prove the existence of Elder Bairns, suborning Nono, Nene, and Shinichirō to help her.

Fumito, Itsuki, and Yūka confront them, with Fumito unleashing an Elder Bairn that brutally kills Nono, Nene and Shinichirō for their treachery. Saya saves Kanako from the Elder Bairn and kills it, but Kanako is then killed by Tadayoshi, revealed to be a human-Elder Bairn hybrid driven berserk by an overdose of Saya's blood Fumito gave him. Saya—now back to her true self—is forced to kill Tadayoshi, and witnesses Fumito release an artificial Elder Bairn that slaughters the town's population before Saya kills it. Fumito's soldiers attempt to shoot Saya, but Itsuki sacrifices himself to save her, as he had grown to love her. Fumito and Yūka—who participated to achieve political power with Fumito's help—escape on a helicopter. When Saya tries to stop them, Fumito shoots her. Recovering on the lakeside, Saya learns from the dog that her wish was to remain herself when in Fumito's experiment, and that she must now pursue her next wish. Saya sets off in pursuit of Fumito.

== Characters ==
- Saya Kisaragi (更衣 小夜, Kisaragi Saya): The main protagonist—she is unrelated to any previous entry in the Blood franchise aside from her first name, chosen weapon and abilities. Outwardly, Saya is an innocent and clumsy girl who acts as a shrine maiden at her father's shrine, going out at night to hunt Elder Bairns as part of a sworn duty. In reality, she is an Elder Bairn who was abandoned and raised by humans. Due to an oath she swore, she is unable to feed on humans herself, and the experiment was designed to see if her nature could be altered. Saya is voiced by Nana Mizuki in Japanese. Mizuki described Saya as she is portrayed in the anime as an easygoing girl who enjoys her school life and shares a strong bond with Tadayoshi. In the English dub, she is voiced by Alexis Tipton.
- Tadayoshi Kisaragi (更衣 唯芳, Kisaragi Tadayoshi): Saya's father, and the owner of the Shinto shrine where Saya acts as shrine maiden. He also supervises her role as a slayer of Elder Bairns. In truth, he is a human-Elder Bairn hybrid used by Fumito to capture and manipulate Saya due to their strong similarity. Tadayoshi is voiced in Japanese by Keiji Fujiwara. Fujiwara described Tadayoshi as a stern character who hides the depths of his fatherly feelings for Saya. In the English dub, he is voiced by Bill Jenkins.
- Fumito Nanahara (七原 文人, Nanahara Fumito): The owner of a cafe just opposite Saya's home, who acts as cook for Saya and her father, preparing Saya's school lunches. Fumito is revealed to the mastermind behind the entire experiment and the main antagonist, manipulating events in an attempt to rewrite who Saya is. Fumito is voiced in Japanese by Kenji Nojima. Nojima described Fumito's character as a mysterious, friendly and knowledgeable figure. In the English dub, he is voiced by Robert McCollum.
- Yūka Amino (網埜 優花, Amino Yūka): A member of Saya's class who acts as an older sister figure, chastising Saya for being late or distracted while also caring about her. In reality, Yūka is an ally of Fumito who joins his experiment in exchange for political power in Tokyo. She is the only member of the "main cast" to survive. Yūka was voiced in Japanese by Masumi Asano. Asano described Yūka's initial character as a rough and loud person with a kind heart. In the English dub, she is voiced by Martha Harms.
- Itsuki Tomofusa (鞘総 逸樹, Tomofusa Itsuki): The class president for Saya's class, he is considered the class' star and has unspoken feelings for Saya that she is oblivious to. He is also part of the experiment, but develops genuine feelings for Saya that lead to his death when he tries to defend her from Fumito's men. It is later revealed that he was a spy sent by enemies of Fumito to observe and report on the experiment. Itsuki is voiced in Japanese by Atsushi Abe. Abe described Itsuki as a distinguished figure who is overly quiet about his feelings. In the English dub, he is voiced by Chris Burnett.
- Shinichirō Tokizane (時真 慎一郎, Tokizane Shin'ichirō): A taciturn classmate of Saya for whom she develops a crush during the course of the series. While he feigns affection for Saya, he is in revealed to be a mercenary taking part in the experiment on promise of a high payment. Shinichirō is voiced in Japanese by Tatsuhisa Suzuki. Suzuki defined Shinichirō as a silent character with an air of importance surrounding him. In the English dub, he is voiced by Scott Freeman.
- Nene & Nono Motoe (求衛 ねね&のの, Motoe Nene & Nono): A pair of identical twin girls in Saya's class, who act in a mischievous way and often speak in unison. In reality, they are former criminals who participated in the charade to have their records erased so they could find work. The pair are voiced in Japanese by Misato Fukuen. Fukuen described the duo as the anime's "mascot characters". In the English dub, they are voiced by Lindsay Seidel.
- Kanako Tsutsutori (筒鳥 香奈子, Tsutsutori Kanako): Saya's homeroom teacher, a woman with a casual and sometimes joking attitude, and a liking for Saya. She is also fascinated by old stories and folklore. In reality, she is a scholar who agreed to participate in Fumito's scheme to learn about Saya and prove the Elder Bairns' existence. Kanako is voiced in Japanese by Miho Miyagawa. In the English dub she is voiced by Lydia Mackay.
- Dog (犬, Inu): A character who converses with Saya over the course of the series, being the one responsible for granting her wish to remain herself. Its true identity is the familiar of Kimihiro Watanuki, a character from the manga series xxxHolic. The dog is voiced by Jun Fukuyama in Japanese. When he was recording his dialogue for the series, Fukuyama was surprised that the very last line of the final episode was given to a dog. In the English dub, the dog is voiced by Todd Haberkorn.

== Production ==
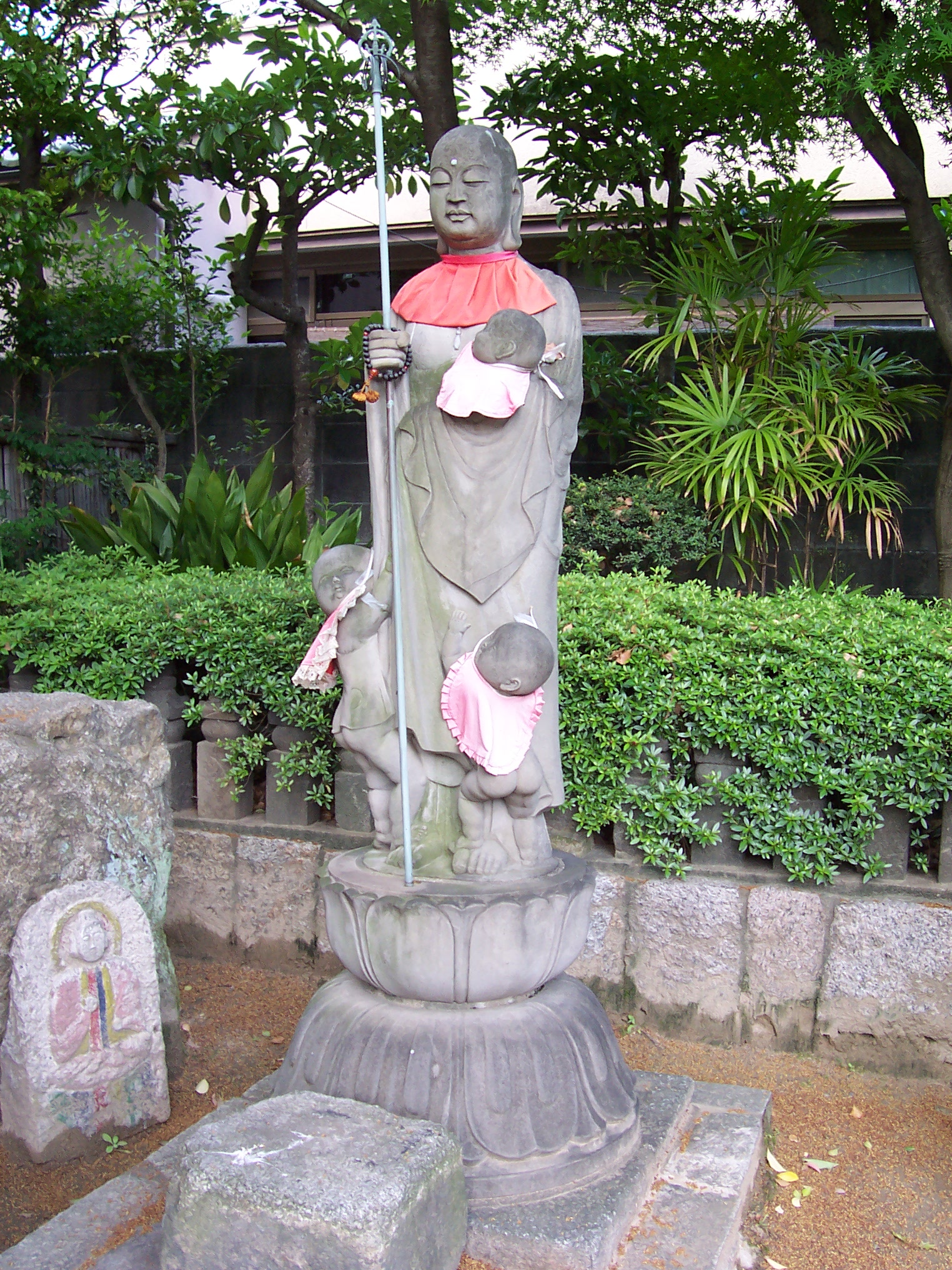
The Yōkai-based designs of the Cthulhu Mythos-inspired Elder Bairns were decided upon after the creation of the first episodes' Elder Bairn, modeled after a Jizo statue.

Blood-C was a collaborative production between Production I.G and CLAMP. Production I.G is an animation studio that had created the Blood franchise with the 2000 film Blood: The Last Vampire, which was the studio's first attempt at an original in-house project. CLAMP is an all-female manga artist group made up of writer Nanase Ohkawa and artists Mokona, Tsubaki Nekoi, and Satsuki Igarashi. The main staff included both newcomers and people who had worked on previous entries in the Blood franchise. These included concept supervisor and co-writer Junichi Fujisaku, one of the original creators of the Blood franchise; and director Tsutomu Mizushima, whose most notable recent work was the anime adaptation of CLAMP's manga xxxHolic. Background artwork was created by Hiromasa Ogura, and setting artwork was created by Kazuo Kanpei of Kusanagi. 3D CGI was handled by Tsukamoto Mori. The music was composed by Naoki Satō, whose previous work included Sword of the Stranger. The opening theme "Spiral" was performed by Dustz, who worked hard to make the song a suitable addition to the Blood canon and incorporated both Japanese and French lyrics. The ending theme, "Junketsu Paradox", was sung by Nana Mizuki—the voice actress for Saya—who used the anime's story as inspiration and incorporated archaic phrases for the lyrics. The production team was dubbed "Project BLOOD-C TV".

When developing plans for Blood-C, it was decided to shift its setting based on positive feedback from the change of setting between Blood: The Last Vampire and the franchise's first anime series Blood+. The only elements to be retained were the first name of the main character, having a katana as her weapon, and the basic premise of her defeating monsters with that sword. The wish for the project to be distinct from earlier entries was what spurred the collaboration with CLAMP, which became a large part of the anime's marketing campaign. Fujisaku, when asked in an interview to describe his one creative ambition for the series, said that it was to fully expand and build upon the basic concept established in Blood: The Last Vampire. The choice of a school setting, the first of its kind to be featured in the Blood franchise, was chosen because Mizushima wanted to portray a school life for Saya. When asked, Mizushima did not find the change from his previous comedy anime-based turnout a barrier to his work, but did feel pressure when handling a project within the Blood franchise.

The scripts were written by Ohkawa and Fujisaku. While Ohkawa took charge of each episode's dialogue, Fujisaku handled fight sequences. Fujisaku pointedly avoided contributing too much to the dialogue as Ohkawa's writing had a very distinctive style, his alterations made only due to story inconsistencies. The series was composed in a way that gradually revealed the central mystery while pitting Saya against progressively stronger foes. The setting's intensely "normal" appearance was designed to make viewers feel uneasy as faults begin appearing in Saya's everyday life. According to Ohkawa, the main theme of the series was examination of the hero's role as a lonely protector of the innocent. Alongside this was the portrayal of Saya's seemingly normal life and now her role as the town's protector began intruding upon this everyday life. The final episodes were intended to evoke viewer sympathy for Saya due to the terrible ordeal she had been subjected to. The series broke from conventions of a hero-focused anime by portraying the relationships between Saya and those close to her in a very shallow way during the opening episodes. For the final few episodes, when the truth is revealed about Saya and her school life, the supporting cast were generally portrayed as "hateful" people that the viewers would wish to see die. So as to keep the series' twist ending a secret, the entire voice cast including Mizuki and Nojima—the respective voice actors of Saya and Fumito—were told nothing about the final episode's events. A different interview revealed that each cast member was only given the scripts for three episodes at any one time to preserve secrecy. The subtitle of each episode was drawn from the Japanese poetry anthology Ogura Hyakunin Isshu. The series made regular use of bloody violence, which was exaggerated to distance viewers from the show's horrific elements. Despite this, the director said the show was not deliberately focused on bloody violence.

The design of the main cast was handled by CLAMP. According to Mizushima, the team wanted to portray Saya in a far more human way than her previous incarnations, ending up creating a character more human than even the true human characters. Saya's character as a long-haired, song-singing meganekko (girl in glasses) almost entirely created by CLAMP. Due to the stark differences between this version of Saya and previous versions, Fujisaku did not use her original surname "Otonashi", so viewers could clearly distinguish Saya's portrayal from previous entries. When deciding upon her strength, Mizushima decided to use Hit-Girl from the movie Kick-Ass as a role model, making Saya stronger than Hit-Girl while also putting her into a high school environment. The animation character designer was Kazuchika Kise, who worked on Blood: The Last Vampire. Yasuomi Umetsu directed and worked on the storyboard for the game's opening along with Kise. A key part of the opening was a layer of blood peeling away from Saya's naked form. While compared by many to the opening of Ghost in the Shell, Umetsu said that it represented Saya's personal evolution during the course of the show.

The Elder Bairns were designed by Tomohiro Shinoda. They were initially conceived by Ohkawa as Japanese versions of the Great Old Ones, figures from the Cthulhu Mythos created by H. P. Lovecraft, but this was changed. While some elements remained from the initial concept, the final Elder Bairns' physical forms as faced by Saya were inspired by yokai from Japanese folklore at Mizushima's insistence—this design choice was decided upon after storyboarding finished for the fight against the first episode's Elder Bairn, which was modeled after a Jizo statue. This initial concept was expanded upon by Mizushima, Ohkawa and Fujisaku. The disguised form of the Elder Bairn from the fifth episode was based on train carriages from the Kamikōchi Line in Nagano Prefecture that Mizushima had enjoyed traveling on as a boy. The Elder Bairn from the ninth episode was intended for the second episode, but the staff felt it was too strong to appear so early, so it was shifted to a later episode. All the Elder Bairns were designed to give the impression of a "vivid, flesh-and-blood texture".

== Broadcast ==
Blood-C was first announced in March 2011, with its core staff and its approximate air date in July. The series began broadcasting on July 7, 2011. While scheduled for June 7, its late night slot meant that the first episode's actual broadcast was on July 8. In celebration of the anime's release, an autographed copy of the first episode's script was offered in a competition through the anime's official website. A special web radio series featuring actors from the show also began broadcast in July alongside the series. Dubbed "Blood-R", it ran for eleven episodes. It first began broadcasting on MBS TV on July 7 and Tokyo Broadcasting System Television on July 8. Several episodes were repeated during the original broadcast in a three-day successive broadcast in August. Its twelve-episode run ended on September 30, 2011. During the original broadcast, scenes where Saya's friends or other humans characters were killed by the Elder Bairns—the process of which invariably involved extensive blood and gore—were censored with areas of light and darkness. The deaths of Elder Bairns and mild erotic elements during a bathing scene with Saya were left uncensored.

During its original run, it was broadcast simultaneously in North America, the United Kingdom, Canada, Australia, New Zealand and South Africa through the Western branch of Niconico. In addition to this, the series broadcast on Chubu-Nippon Broadcasting from July 13, and Kumamoto Asahi Broadcasting RRK station from July 31. Blood-C would later debut on Wowow in 2013: Episodes 1 to 10 were broadcast back to back on September 22, while the final two episodes broadcast on September 29. In 2015, Niconico's Japanese channel ran a marathon broadcast of all twelve episodes starting from June 28. Blood-C was one of three anime cited—alongside Highschool of the Dead and Terror in Resonance—in a warning given by the Chinese Ministry of Culture to video streaming sites due to the series high violence. Blood-C was later put on a blacklist by the Ministry of Culture alongside 37 other anime and manga series in 2015, prohibiting its physical and online distribution in mainland China.

=== Home media ===
The series' Blu-ray and DVD releases were handled in Japan by Aniplex. The series released in six volumes between September 28, 2011, and February 22, 2012. The series' English dub and North American licensing was handled by Funimation. A box set containing the whole series released for Blu-ray and DVD on January 22, 2013. In Australia, the series was licensed by Madman Entertainment, releasing as a box set for DVD and Blu-ray on April 17, 2013. In the United Kingdom, the series was licensed by Manga Entertainment and released as a box set on DVD and Blu-ray on June 10, 2013. Anime Limited later rescued the series and released it on Blu-ray on August 29, 2022.

== Related media ==
=== Films ===
==== Blood-C: The Last Dark (2012) ====
A theatrical anime film was announced shortly after the anime series, acting as a conclusion to the story of Blood-C. Titled Blood-C: The Last Dark, it released in Japanese theaters on June 2, 2012.

==== Asura Girl: Blood-C Another Story (2017) ====
A live-action prequel film titled Asura Girl: Blood-C Another Story, was announced in January 2017. The film was directed by Shutaro Oku and written by Junichi Fujisaku. Kentarō Nakao is the music composer, while Sennosuke Okumura produced the film. It was released in Japanese theaters on August 26, 2017. The movie is set on a village near Tokyo in a Pre-World War II era, where bloody conflict between the villagers and Japan's Special Higher Police forces erupts. The film focuses on Ran, who was introduced in The Last Mind stage play.

==== Blood-Club Dolls (2018, 2020) ====
A second live-action movie, Blood-Club Dolls 1 was announced in February 2018. Oku returned as a director and co-wrote the screenplay with Fujisaku. Kōsuke Nishimoto is the music composer, and Okumura returned as a producer. The film was released in Japanese theaters on October 13, 2018. A third live-action movie and a sequel, Blood-Club Dolls 2 was announced in December 2019, along with the returning staff and casts. The film was released in Japanese theaters on July 11, 2020. The two films focuses on Soēn, Fumito's henchman that was also introduced in The Last Mind stage play, and takes place before the events of The Last Dark film.

=== Stage play ===
==== Blood-C: The Last Mind (2015) ====
Blood-C: The Last Mind
- Company: Nega Design Works
- Genre: Action, Horror, Dark fantasy
- Show type: Melodrama, Tragedy
- Date of premiere: July 2, 2015
- Final show: July 5, 2015
- Location: Setagaya Public Theater

Creative team
- Creator: Production I.G. and CLAMP (based on Blood-C)
- Director: Shutaro Oku
- Script: Junichi Fujisaku
- Official website

A stage play titled Blood-C: The Last Mind was produced by Nega Design Works, being staged at the Setagaya Public Theater between July 2 to July 5, 2015. The stage play was directed by Shutaro Oku, who also created stage plays based on Persona series, and written by Junichi Fujisaku, who co-wrote the scripts for 12-episode TV anime and the feature film. Set between the events of Blood-C and The Last Dark, it expands upon Fumito's backstory. Several actors from the play reprised their perspective roles for the live-action movies, mainly Kanon Miyahara as Saya Kisaragi, and Keisuke Minami as Fumito Nanahara.

=== Print ===
==== Novelization ====
A novelization of the series was released on October 4, 2011, and novelization of the feature film on June 2, 2012, written by Junichi Fujisaku and published by Kadokawa Shoten.

==== Manga ====
A manga adaptation of Blood-C was announced alongside the anime. Adapted by manga artist Ranmaru Kotone, it debuted in the June issue of Monthly Shōnen Ace on May 26. The manga ended in August 2012, having run for over a year. The manga was released in four volumes between July 26, 2011, and November 21, 2012, by Kadokawa Shoten. The manga covered the events of the 12-episode anime series and The Last Dark film. The manga was licensed for the West by Dark Horse Comics. Its four volumes released between March 6, 2013, and December 30, 2015.

A second spin-off manga series titled Blood-C: Demonic Moonlight began serialization in the debut issue of Newtype Ace in September 2011. It was written and illustrated by Ryo Haduki, with Junichi Fujisaku as a story consultant. Set in post-war Japan in 1946, the story of Demonic Moonlight acts as a prequel to Blood-C. The manga focuses on David, who works alongside a mysterious swordless swordsman named Kagekiri on a mysterious cases of humans being killed by Elder Bairns, Fumito's family and Saya's origin. The manga ended in May 2012. It was released in two volumes on December 17, 2011, and May 23, 2012. As with the series' manga adaptation, Dark Horse Comics licensed the manga for Western publication. The two volumes released on May 18 and August 3, 2016.

===== Volumes =====
====== Blood-C ======
No.	Original release date	Original ISBN	North American release date	North American ISBN
1	July 26, 2011	978-4-04-715754-5	December 11, 2013	978-1-61655-097-4
Chapter 1; Chapter 2; Chapter 3; Chapter 4
2	December 26, 2011	978-4-04-120047-6	January 8, 2014	978-1-61655-154-4
Chapter 5; Chapter 6; Chapter 7; Chapter 8
3	May 26, 2012	978-4-04-120235-7	March 5, 2014	978-1-61655-314-2
Chapter 9; Chapter 10; Chapter 11; Chapter 12
4	November 26, 2012	978-4-04-120499-3	January 20, 2016	978-1-61655-851-2
Chapter 13; Chapter 14; Chapter 15; Chapter 16

====== Blood-C: Demonic Moonlight ======
No.	Original release date	Original ISBN	English release date	English ISBN
1	December 17, 2011	978-4-04-120048-3	June 1, 2016	978-1-61655-909-0
First Night (第一夜, Dai Ichi Yoru); Second Night (第二夜, Dai Ni Yoru); Third Night (第三夜, Dai San Yoru); Fourth Night (第四夜, Dai Yon Yoru)
2	May 23, 2012	978-4-04-120277-7	August 24, 2016	978-1-61655-975-5
Fifth Night (第五夜, Dai Go Yoru); Sixth Night (第六夜, Dai Roku Yoru); Seventh Night (第七夜, Dai Nana Yoru); Eighth Night (第八夜, Dai Hachi Yoru); Ninth Night (第九夜, Dai Kyu Yoru)

== Reception ==
During its opening week, the first DVD/Blu-ray volume failed to reach a high position in the charts against many anime and live-action releases, selling only 727 copies according to Oricon. In contrast, at its release in the United Kingdom, the Complete Series release reached #4 in the anime charts. At the Reaper Award awards show, Blood-C was awarded the 2013 for "Best Animation".

Richard Eisenbeis of Kotaku praised the character and Elder Bairn designs, and also enjoyed the questions the anime posed about where Blood-C fit in both the overall Blood franchise and the works of CLAMP. He was more mixed about the odd juxtaposition of innocent school life with the high violence of Elder Bairn encounters. He was also unsure about the ending, saying it tidied up the series' mysteries but required watching the movie to understand the story. He ended his review by calling Blood-C "a beautifully drawn show with excellent action and a legitimately compelling mystery".

Bradley Meek, writing for THEM Anime, gave the series 3/5 stars. He praised the way the series maintained its horror-based atmosphere in between the action sequences. He greatly enjoyed the horror and action aspects, but felt that the character-driven segments in early episodes threatened to drag down the whole experience due to mundane content and poor characters. Talking about the anime's second half, he said that it drastically altered the pace and content to the point that viewers might be put off with its conscious bending of the rules of handling characters and viewers alike—Meek was ultimately angry at the series' brutal ending, but it also left him eager to see its movie conclusion.

Anime News Network's Carlo Santos gave the subtitled version a score of "B−" and the dubbed version as score of "C+". He found the darker elements hidden so well in early episodes that it made the series boring to watch, and that the ending would divide opinion due to its drastic alteration of how events in the series played out and its discussion of both horror tropes and the standard elements of the Blood franchise. The action scenes came in for regular praise for their choreography and many monster designs, but the school life segments were seen as boring and overly slender character designs. Santos unreservedly praised the music's quality and recurring melodies despite calling the opening and ending themes "typical angst-ridden rock numbers". He called the English dub "understated (but not emotionless)", finding that it reinforced the overall atmosphere and only suffered due to the original writing.
