= Keisuke Minami =

Japanese actor and singer

- 南 圭介
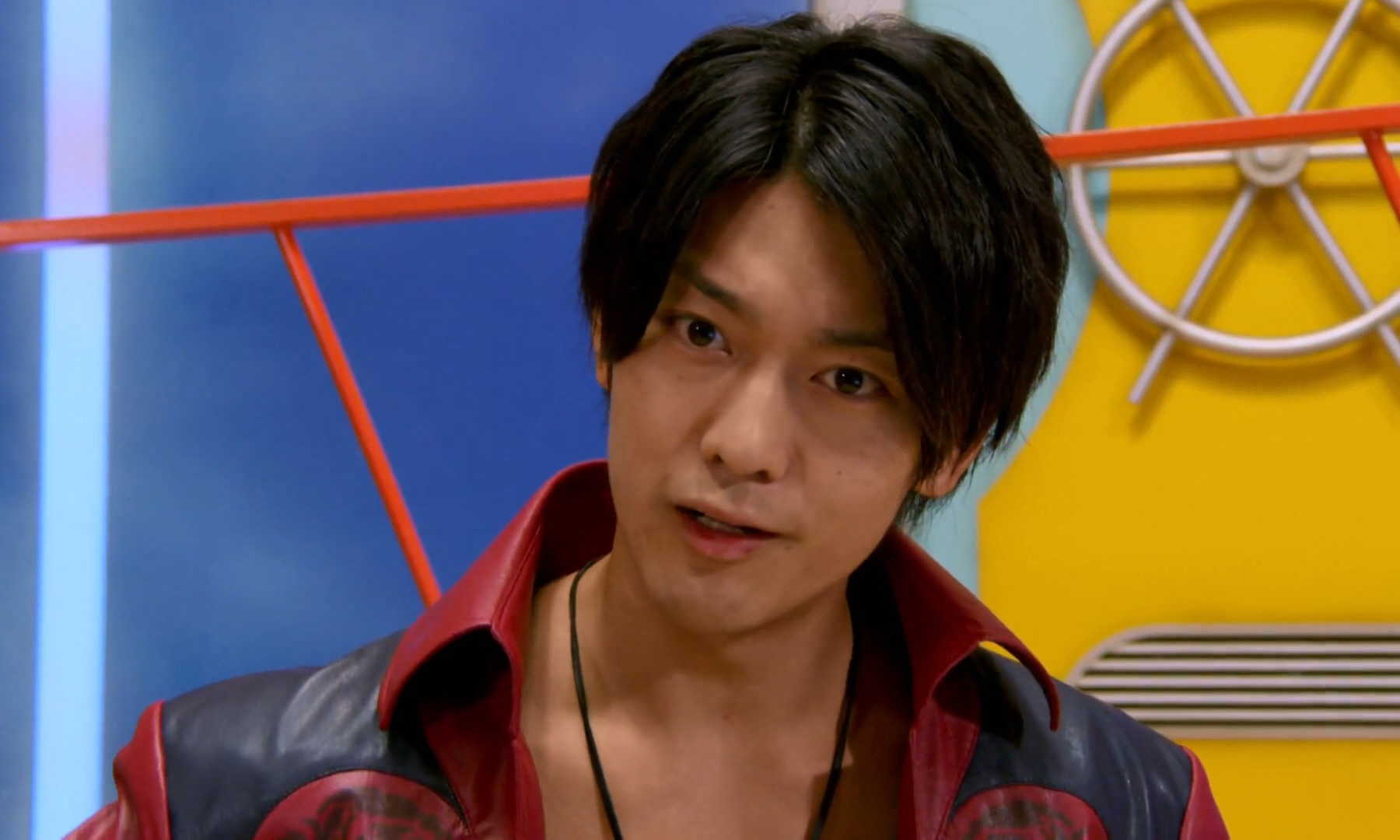
- Keisuke Minami
- Born: 3 July 1985 (age 41); Yokohama, Japan
- Occupation: Actor
- Years active: 2004–present
- Height: 183 cm (6 ft 0 in)

Keisuke Minami (南 圭介, Minami Keisuke) (born 3 July 1985) is a Japanese actor and singer. He is best known for his role as Kunimitsu Tezuka in the Prince of Tennis musical series, Tenimyu, of the third generation Seigaku cast, Tsurugi Ohtori/HououSoldier in Uchu Sentai Kyuranger, and a live-action portrayal of Fumito Nanahara in Blood-C series. He is one of PureBoys.

== Career ==
In 2006, Keisuke won the role of Kunimitsu Tezuka, the stoic captain of Seigaku Middle School's tennis club, as part of the third generation Seigaku cast, becoming the fourth actor to play Tezuka in The Prince of Tennis musicals, Tenimyu. He made his debut as Tezuka on 3 August 2006 in the Advancement Match Rokkaku feat. Hyotei Gakuen performance in Osaka.

In 2007, after the Absolute King Rikkai feat. Rokkaku ~ Second Service performance, he, along with the majority of the third generation Seigaku cast, graduated from their roles. Since his graduation, the role of Tezuka has been played by Daisuke Watanabe and Ryoma Baba.

In 2015, Minami was cast as Fumito Nanahara in Blood-C anime's stage play, Blood-C: The Last Mind. He later reprised his role for the three live-action films: Asura Girl: Blood-C Another Story in 2017, Blood-Club Dolls 1 in 2018, and Blood-Club Dolls 2 in 2020.

In 2017, ten years since his graduation from the TeniMyu musicals, Keisuke would go on to play Tsurugi Ohtori/Houou Soldier in Uchu Sentai Kyuranger.

== Filmography ==
=== Film ===
Year	Title	Role	Note
2017	Asura Girl: Blood-C Another Story	Fumito Nanahara	
2018	Blood-Club Dolls 1	Fumito Nanahara	
2020	Blood-Club Dolls 2	Fumito Nanahara	

=== Tokusatsu ===
- Uchu Sentai Kyuranger – as Tsurugi Ohtori/Houou (2017)

=== Stage Work ===
- Tenimyu: The Prince of Tennis Musical Series (as Kunimitsu Tezuka)
  - The Prince of Tennis Musical: Advancement Match Rokkaku feat. Hyotei Gakuen (2006)
  - The Prince of Tennis Musical: Absolute King Rikkai feat. Rokkaku ~ First Service (In Winter of 2006–2007)
  - The Prince of Tennis Musical: Dream Live 4th (2007)
  - The Prince of Tennis Musical: Dream Live 4th ~extra~ (2007)
  - The Prince of Tennis Musical: Absolute King Rikkai feat. Rokkaku ~ Second Service (2007)
- K The Stage (as Reisi Munakata):
  - K The Stage (2014)
  - K The Stage II -Arousal of King- (2015)
- Blood-C: The Last Mind – as Fumito Nanahara (2015)

Preceded by Yu Shirota	Kunimitsu Tezuka in the Prince of Tennis Musicals; 2006–2007	Succeeded by Daisuke Watanabe
