= Kanon Miyahara =

Japanese model and actress (born 1996)

- 宮原 華音
- Born: April 8, 1996 (age 30); Akita Prefecture, Japan
- Occupations: Model, actress
- Years active: 2011–present
- Agent: Tambourine Artists
- Height: 1.7 m (5 ft 7 in)
- Website: Official agency profile

Kanon Miyahara
- Height: 170 cm (5 ft 7 in)
- Weight: 52.0 kg (114.6 lb; 8.19 st)
- Style: Karate, Kickboxing
- Stance: Orthodox
- Fighting out of: Tokyo, Japan
- Team: TARGET SHIBUYA/FIRSTORDER AGENT
- Years active: 2023 - present

Kickboxing record
- Total: 1
- Wins: 1
- By knockout: 1
- Losses: 0

Kanon Miyahara (宮原 華音, Miyahara Kanon; born April 8, 1996) is a Japanese model, actress and professional kickboxer. She is known for her role as Sakura Yamanami in the 2014 film High Kick Angels, and a live-action portrayal of Saya Kisaragi in Blood-C series.

She was born in Akita Prefecture but raised in Tokyo. She graduated from Nihon Newart High School and Nippon Sport Science University. She is a first dan holder in karate and judo.

== Professional kickboxing career ==
Miyahara made her professional kickboxing debut against fellow debutante Kumiko Kaneko at RISE 167 on April 21, 2023. She won the fight by technical knockout, 39 seconds into the round.

== Filmography ==
=== Film ===
Year	Title	Role	Note
2014	Death Blog	Yui Akasaka	
2014	High Kick Angels	Sakura Yamanami	
2015	Assassination Classroom	Megu Kataoka	
2015	Tag	Chihiro	
2016	Assassination Classroom: Graduation	Megu Kataoka	
2017	Asura Girl: Blood-C Another Story	Saya Kisaragi	
2018	Kamen Rider Amazons the Movie: The Last Judgement	Nozomi Takai	
2018	Blood-Club Dolls 1	Saya Kisaragi	
2019	Blackfox: Age of the Ninja	Uto	
2020	Blood-Club Dolls 2	Saya Kisaragi	
2026	Ninja Wars: Blackfox vs. Shogun's Ninja	Okyo	

=== Tokusatsu ===
- Kamen Rider Amazons – Nozomi Takai (2016–17)
- Ultraman Z – Alien Pitt "Fa" (2020)
- Akari – Akari (2022)
- Kamen Rider Gotchard – Clotho (2023–24)

== Stage ==
Year	Title	Role	Note
2015	Blood-C: The Last Mind	Saya Kisaragi	

== Professional Kickboxing record ==
Kickboxing record
1 Win (1 (T)KO's), 0 Loss, 0 Draw, 0 No Contest
Date	Result	Opponent	Event	Location	Method	Round	Time
2023-04-21	Win	(Japan) Kumiko Kaneko	RISE 167	Tokyo, Japan	TKO (Punches)	1	0:39
Legend: Win Loss Draw/No contest Notes
