= Junichi Fujisaku =

Japanese anime director and screenwriter (born 1967)

- 藤咲 淳一
- Born: August 6, 1967 (age 59); Ibaraki Prefecture, Japan
- Occupations: Anime director, screenwriter, novelist
- Notable work: Blood franchise; Ghost in the Shell: Arise

Japanese name
- Kanji: 藤咲 淳一
- Hiragana: ふじさく じゅんいち
- Romanization: Fujisaku Jun'ichi

Junichi Fujisaku (Japanese: 藤咲 淳一, Hepburn: Fujisaku Jun'ichi; born August 6, 1967) is a Japanese anime director, screenwriter and novelist that mostly known for his work on the Blood franchise and Ghost in the Shell: Arise series, produced by Production I.G.

== Career ==
Junichi Fujisaku started working at Production I.G in the late 1990s. He acted as a planning assistant when Blood: The Last Vampire anime film was in development. The film was released in 2000, and that same year, he chief directed, written and edited the video game adaptation of The Last Vampire. A year later, Fujisaku wrote two novelizations based on the anime film.

In 2005, Fujisaku directed and wrote the spin-off anime of Blood: The Last Vampire, titled Blood+. He created the series to expland the Blood universe that wasn't explored in The Last Vampire film. The anime ran for fifty episodes, and became its own franchise with two light novel adaptations, three manga adaptations, and two video games. That same year, Fujisaku co-wrote the screenplay for both xxxHolic: A Midsummer Night's Dream and Tsubasa Reservoir Chronicle the Movie: The Princess in the Birdcage Kingdom.

In 2010, Fujisaku debuted his film directorial work, Loups=Garous.

In 2011, Fujisaku was a head writer for both Moshidora and Appleseed XIII. That same year, Fujisaku, with studio Production I.G, collaborated with manga artist group CLAMP in the new anime entry of the Blood franchise, titled Blood-C. He acted as a creative supervisor, and co-wrote the scripts with CLAMP member and leader Nanase Ohkawa. The anime ran for twelve episodes, and continued with the sequel anime film, Blood-C: The Last Dark the following year, with Fujisaku as a co-writer once again. The anime received two novelizations and two manga adaptations within those two years, and Fujisaku wrote the novel adaptations, and story consulted the prequel manga, Blood-C: Demonic Moonlight.

In 2015, Fujisaku was a head writer for Pikaia!. Around the same year, Fujisaku wrote the script for a stage play adaptation of Blood-C, titled Blood-C: The Last Mind. The play was set between the twelve episode anime and The Last Dark film. Fujisaku also wrote the first stage adaptation for Ghost in the Shell series, titled Ghost in the Shell Arise: Ghost is Alive.

In 2017, Fujisaku wrote a novelization of Blood+ anime titled Blood#, which takes place after the series finale, focusing on Diva's grown children, Hibiki and Kanade. That same year, he was in charge of writing the script for the first live-action film adaptation of Blood-C, titled Asura Girl: Blood-C Another Story, acting as a prequel to the series.

In 2018, Fujisaku co-wrote the script with director Shutaro Oku on the second live-action film adaptation for Blood-C, titled Blood-Club Dolls 1, and its sequel, Blood-Club Dolls 2 in 2020. Both films take place before the events of The Last Dark anime film.

In 2020, Fujisaku collaborated with director Oku once again on VR Noh stage play of Ghost in the Shell, simply titled VR Noh: Ghost in the Shell.

In 2021, Fujisaku was a head writer for the anime adaptation of Mars Red. That same year, it was announced that he will chief direct and screenwrite for Deemo: Memorial Keys anime film, which was released in February 2022. That same year, Fujisaku acted as a head writer for the live-action GaruGaku series.

== Filmography ==
=== TV Anime ===
Year	Title	Credit	Notes
2002	Ghost in the Shell: S. A. C. 2nd GIG	Script (eps. 30, 32–33)	
2005-06	Blood+	Director, Series Composition, Script (eps. 1), Episode Director (eps. 45)	
2011	Appleseed XIII	Series Composition, Script (eps. 1–2, 6–7, 11–12)	
2011	Blood-C	Script (eps. 1–12), Series Concept Supervisor	Co-written with Nanase Ohkawa of CLAMP
2011	Moshidora	Series Composition, Script (eps. 1, 3, 6–7, 9–10)	
2015	Pikaia!	Series Composition, Script (eps. 1–2, 5–7, 10–13)	
2015	Ghost in the Shell: Arise - Alternative Architecture	Script (eps. 9–10)	
2016	Pocket Monsters: Sun & Moon	Script (eps. 28, 33, 39, 45, 51, 57, 64, 68, 76, 79, 82, 85, 93, 95, 104, 109, 112, 117, 121, 126, 129, 133)	
2019	Pocket Monsters	Script (eps. 26)	
2020	Attack on Titan: The Final Season	Planning, Production	
2020–21	GaruGaku: Saint Girls Square Academy	Series Composition, Script (eps. 1-50)	
2021	Mars Red	Series Composition, Script (eps. 1–13)	
2022	GaruGaku II: Lucky Stars	Series Composition, Script (eps. 1–10)	
2024–2026	Himitsu no AiPri	Director, Script (eps. 7, 12, 24), Storyboard (eps. 2, 6, 12, 24)	Co-directed with Kentaro Yamaguchi
2026–present	Onegai AiPri	Director	Co-directed with Masahiro Matsunaga

=== Anime film ===
Year	Title	Credit	Notes
2000	Blood: The Last Vampire	Planning Assistant ("Oshii Juku")	
2005	xxxHolic: A Midsummer Night's Dream	Screenplay	Co-written with Yoshiki Sakurai
2005	Tsubasa Reservoir Chronicle the Movie: The Princess in the Birdcage Kingdom	Screenplay	Co-written with Midori Goto
2010	Loups=Garous	Director	
2012	Blood-C: The Last Dark	Screenplay	Co-written with Nanase Ohkawa of CLAMP
2015	Ghost in the Shell: The New Movie	Supervisor	
2022	Deemo: Memorial Keys	Chief Director, Screenplay	

=== OVA (Original Video Animations) ===
Year	Title	Credit	Notes
2013-15	Ghost in the Shell: Arise	Supervisor	

=== Video games ===
Year	Title	Credit	Note
2000	Blood: The Last Vampire	Chief Director, Script, Editor	

=== Live-action drama ===
Year	Title	Credit	Notes
2021	GaruGaku: Girls Garden	Series Composition, Script (eps. 1–3, 8)	

=== Live-action film ===
Year	Title	Credit	Notes
2017	Asura Girl: Blood-C Another Story	Screenplay	
2018	Blood-Club Dolls 1	Screenplay	Co-written with Shutaro Oku
2020	Blood-Club Dolls 2	Screenplay	Co-written with Shutaro Oku

== Stage ==
Year	Title	Credit	Notes
2015	Blood-C: The Last Mind	Script	
2015	Ghost in the Shell Arise: Ghost is Alive	Script	
2020	VR Noh: Ghost in the Shell	Script	

== Bibliography ==
=== Novels ===
- Blood: The Last Vampire
  - Fujisaku, Junichi (January 25, 2001). Blood The Last Vampire: Yami o Izanau Chī BLOOD THE LAST VAMPIRE 闇を誘う血 [Blood: The Last Vampire: The Blood Which Invites the Darkness] (in Japanese). Fujimi Shobo. ISBN 4-8291-6109-4.
  - Fujisaku, Junichi (July 1, 2001). Blood The Last Vampire: Shanhai Aibyō BLOOD THE LAST VAMPIRE 上海哀儚 [Blood: The Last Vampire: A Tragic Dream in Shanghai] (in Japanese). Fujimi Shobo. ISBN 4-8291-7474-9.
- Blood+
  - Fujisaku, Junichi (February 28, 2017). Blood# BLOOD# [Blood Hash] (in Japanese). Mag Garden. ISBN 978-4-80-000657-8.
- Blood-C
  - Fujisaku, Junichi (October 4, 2011). Blood-C BLOOD-C [Blood-C] (in Japanese). Kadokawa Shoten. ISBN 978-4-04-394477-4.
  - Fujisaku, Junichi (June 2, 2012). Blood-C: The Last Dark BLOOD-C The Last Dark [Blood-C The Last Dark]. Kadokawa Shoten. ISBN 978-4-04-100300-8.
- Ghost in the Shell: Stand Alone Complex
  - Fujisaku, Junichi (May 24, 2006). Ghost in the Shell: Stand Alone Complex: The Lost Memory. Dark Horse Comics. ISBN 1-59582-072-8.
  - Fujisaku, Junichi (September 26, 2006). Ghost in the Shell: Stand Alone Complex: Revenge of the Cold Machine. Dark Horse Comics. ISBN 1-59582-073-6.
  - Fujisaku, Junichi (January 2, 2007). Ghost in the Shell: Stand Alone Complex: White Maze. Dark Horse Comics. ISBN 978-1-59582-074-7.

=== Manga ===
Year	Title	Credit	Notes
2011	Blood-C: Demonic Moonlight	Story Consultant	Written & illustrated by Ryo Haduki
2019	Ghost in the Shell ARISE: Sleepless Eye	Story, Writer	
2018	Zombie of Mars	Story, Writer	
2019	Ghost in the Shell: The Human Algorithm	Story, Writer	
