= Blood-C: The Last Dark =

2012 film by Naoyoshi Shiotani

- Theatrical release poster
- Japanese: 劇場版「BLOOD-C The Last Dark」
- Revised Hepburn: Gekijōban Buraddo-Shī: Za Rasuto Dāku
- Directed by: Naoyoshi Shiotani; Norihiro Naganuma (Note: Unit Direction Chief (演出チーフ).)
- Screenplay by: Nanase Ohkawa; Junichi Fujisaku
- Based on: Blood-C by Production I.G and CLAMP
- Produced by: Hiroyuki Shimizu; Tooru Kawaguchi; Asuka Yamazaki; Fumi Teranishi; Ikuko Enomoto
- Starring: Nana Mizuki; Kenji Nojima; Ai Hashimoto; Hiroshi Kamiya; Yuki Kaji; Yuichi Nakamura; Kana Hanazawa; Yūko Kaida; Masumi Asano; Junichi Suwabe; Jun Fukuyama
- Cinematography: Eiji Arai
- Edited by: Yoshinori Murakami
- Music by: Naoki Satō
- Production company: Production I.G
- Distributed by: Shochiku Co., Ltd.
- Release date: June 2, 2012
- Running time: 110 minutes
- Country: Japan
- Language: Japanese
- Budget: US$650,000
- Box office: US$846,261

Blood-C: The Last Dark (Note: Japanese: 劇場版「BLOOD-C The Last Dark」, Hepburn: Gekijōban Buraddo-Shī: Za Rasuto Dāku; lit. "Theatrical Feature Blood-C: The Last Dark") is a 2012 Japanese animated action horror film directed by Naoyoshi Shiotani and co-written by Nanase Ohkawa and Junichi Fujisaku; the film is based on the 2011 anime television series Blood-C co-created by studio Production I.G and manga artist group CLAMP, which the former also produced the film. Distributed by Shochiku, The Last Dark is set six months after the events of Blood-C; in the universe of Blood-C humanity is secretly preyed upon by a race called the Elder Bairns, (Note: 古きもの, Furukimono; lit. "Old Things", also called "Ancient Ones") whose feeding is kept under control by an ancient agreement called Shrovetide. The Last Dark follows Saya as she pursues Fumito Nanahara—the human guardian of Shrovetide who manipulated and betrayed her—through Tokyo with the help of an underground organization called SIRRUT. The film stars Nana Mizuki as the voice of Saya and Kenji Nojima as Fumito, alongside Ai Hashimoto, Hiroshi Kamiya, Yuki Kaji, Yuichi Nakamura, Kana Hanazawa, Yūko Kaida, Masumi Asano, Junichi Suwabe and Jun Fukuyama. The Last Dark was released in Japan on June 2, 2012.

The Last Dark was planned from the outset of the Blood-C project, and once plans were finalized it developed alongside the series. While it concluded the Blood-C storyline, the film adopted a very different tone, and included thematic and visual references to Blood: The Last Vampire. The movie also featured a character from CLAMP's manga series xxxHolic as a cameo. Its home media releases were respectively handled by Aniplex (Japan), Funimation (North America), Manga Entertainment and Anime Limited (United Kingdom), and Madman Entertainment (Australia). Reception to the film was mixed, receiving praise for its animation and music, while many faulted its story as being underdeveloped or straying too far from the series it concluded.

== Plot ==
Blood-C: The Last Dark, which follows the events of Blood-C, is set in a version of Earth where humans are preyed upon by monsters called Elder Bairns; to keep humans safe, the Elder Bairns honor a covenant dubbed Shrovetide, a contract between humans and Elder Bairns that allows Elder Bairns to feed on humans for a limited period of time. During the events of Blood-C, Saya fights Elder Bairns attacking her village. It is eventually revealed that Saya is an Elder Bairn barred from drinking human blood by an oath—captured by Fumito Nanahara, head of the organization that supervises Shrovetide, she entered a wager in which she would subject herself to an experiment, with her prize being the reneging of her oath. The experiment fails, and everyone involved is massacred aside from Fumito, his ally Yūka Amino, and Saya herself. Betrayed by Fumito, Saya swears vengeance against him. By the events of The Last Dark, Fumito—operating through his covert group Tower and its puppet corporation Seventh Heaven—has gained control of Tokyo's government and implemented the Youth Ordinance Bill, a law which enforces curfews for minors and regulates the use of the internet.

Six months later in Tokyo, Saya saves a girl named Mana Hīragi from a berserk humanoid Elder Bairn. Mana and Saya are rescued by Mana's comrades in SIRRUT, a covert group resisting Fumito's group who heard about Saya's past through Itsuki Tomofusa, a spy who died following the experiment. The group is led by Fumito's relative Kuroto Mogari, whose family was killed so Fumito could have control over the Shrovetide. Kuroto offers Saya SIRRUT's aid finding Fumito in exchange for her help. Hunted by Tower, and after saving Mana from Youth Ordinance Bill enforcers, Saya agrees to help. Saya and Mana infiltrate a private academy funded by Fumito when he is scheduled to give a lecture. When Saya attacks, it is revealed to be a trap baited with a false version of Fumito, and she must fight off an Elder Bairn before they can escape. In the aftermath, Mana reveals that her father disappeared after she helped him with his research into Tower. Regaining her confidence as a hacker, Mana locates Tower's main base, allowing Saya to infiltrate the base.

Facing the task force unit, she fights the head of Tower's security forces Kutō, killing him after he uses a vial of Saya's blood to transform into an Elder Bairn hybrid. Finding Fumito in the building's basement, she also finds Kuroto with him, before succumbing to a drug given by Kuroto. Fumito and Kuroto—whose family has the power to control Elder Bairns—were working together, with each killing the others' families to take control of Tower and Seventh Heaven. Saya also learns that the Elder Bairn who tried to kill Mana was Mana's father. When Kuroto attempts to kill him to control Shrovetide, Fumito stabs him with a phial of Saya's blood, transforming Kuroto into an Elder Bairn seed and killing him.

Fumito reveals his intent to dissolve Shrovetide using Saya's blood as the ratio of humans to Elder Bairns has shifted drastically due to the Elder Bairn seemingly dying out. As Saya recovers from the drug, Fumito fuses with the seed, which hatches into a giant Elder Bairn which Saya slays. A weakened Fumito reveals that he transformed himself into an Elder Bairn hybrid to become closer to Saya and free her from her oath not to feed on humans. Accepting that he has lost their wager, he impales himself on Saya's sword. Saddened at being left alone again, Saya does not return to SIRRUT, instead opting to disappear. In the aftermath, Yūka becomes Tokyo's governor and repeals the Youth Ordinance Bill, the members of SIRRUT return to a normal life, and Mana begins searching for Saya as the glimpse of her appears on the street of Tokyo.

== Voice cast ==
Character	Japanese voice cast	English voice cast
Saya	Nana Mizuki	Alexis Tipton
Fumito Nanahara	Kenji Nojima	Robert McCollum
Yūka Amino	Masumi Asano	Martha Harms
Mana Hīragi	Ai Hashimoto	Jad Saxton
Kuroto Mogari	Hiroshi Kamiya	Mike McFarland
Iori Matsuo	Yuichi Nakamura	Justin Cook
Shun Fujimura	Yūki Kaji	Jessie James Grelle
Hiro Tsukiyama	Kana Hanazawa	Tia Ballard
Haruno Yanagi	Yūko Kaida	Colleen Clinkenbeard
Kutō	Junichi Suwabe	J. Michael Tatum
Dog / Kimihiro Watanuki	Jun Fukuyama	Todd Haberkorn
Tadayoshi Kisaragi	Keiji Fujiwara	Bill Jenkins
Nene & Nono Motoe	Misato Fukuen	Lindsay Seidel
Itsuki Tomofusa	Atsushi Abe	Chris Burnett
Shinchirō Tokizane	Tatsuhisa Suzuki	Scott Freeman
Kanako Tsutsutori	Miho Miyagawa	Lydia Mackay

== Production ==
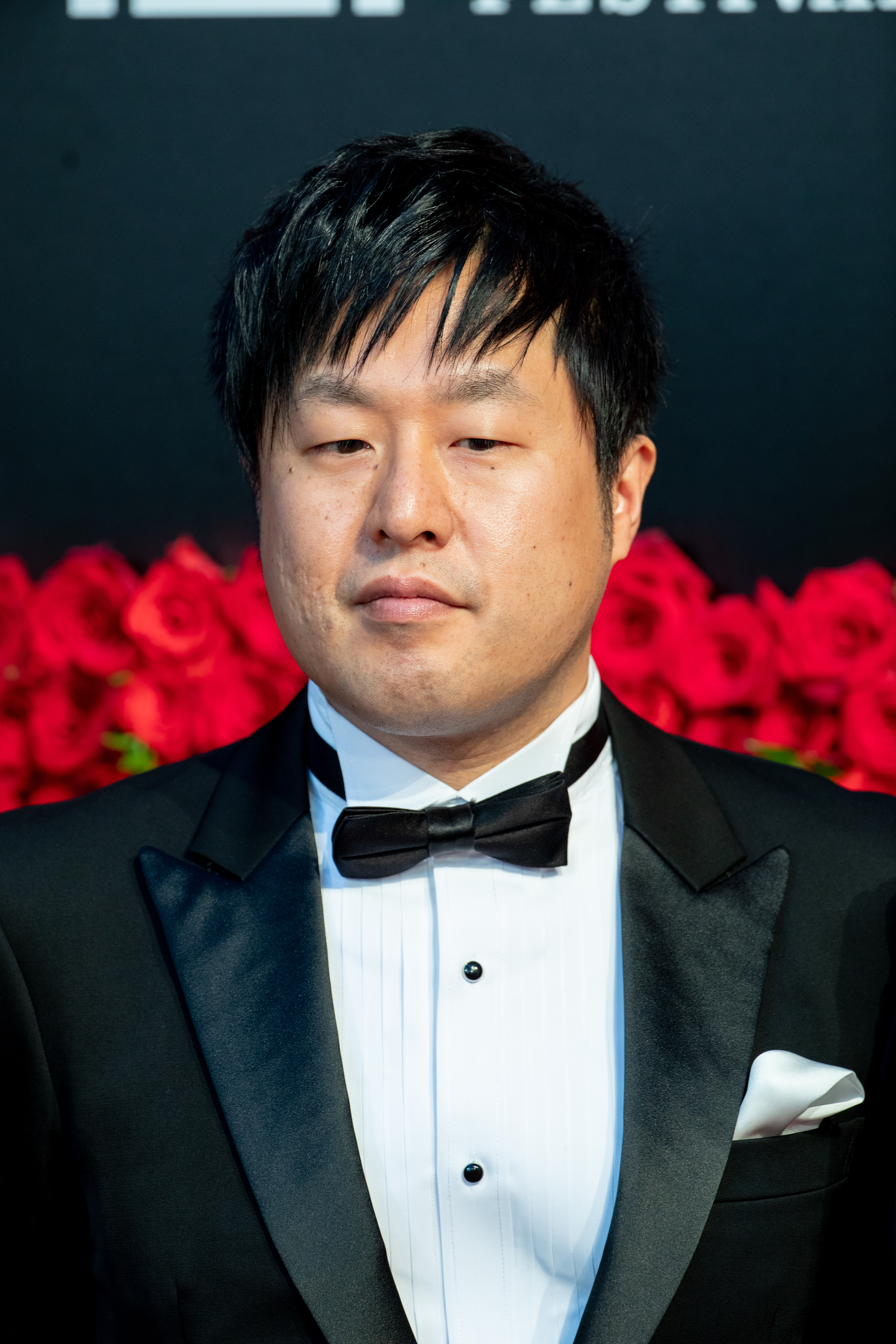
The film was directed by Naoyoshi Shiotani.

The concept for Blood-C: The Last Dark originated during the concept stages for the Blood-C project. During early planning, it was either going to be an original video animation or a theatrical movie. When the team decided to partner with manga artist group CLAMP and had solidified plans and content for the project, it was decided that the series and movie would be developed by separate teams using the same world and characters as a base. Compared to Blood-C, The Last Dark adopted a darker tone and setting with a focus on action. According to director Naoyoshi Shiotani, the film's tone and visuals were designed to be similar to the original Blood movie Blood: The Last Vampire. This impression was communicated through Saya's more stoic portrayal, and in particular the opening ten minutes focusing on action-based storytelling over exposition. Saya's outfit was even modeled after the school girl uniform adopted by the main protagonist of Blood: The Last Vampire.

The script was co-written by Nanase Ohkawa and Junichi Fujisaku, who also worked on the series. According to Fujisaku, the narrative of The Last Dark focused on Saya both seeking revenge and searching for purpose after discovering she was being used by cruel humans. The process of writing The Last Dark ran parallel to Blood-C, and as Ohkawa was preoccupied with the series, Fujisaku put together a basic story and script draft which he expanded and adjusted based on Shiotani's desires for the movie. When Ohkawa came on board, she and Fujisaku worked together to write and polish the final script. Saya's relationships with others despite her non-human status formed a key part of the movie's themes. According to Ohkawa, one of her main issues was keeping the storytelling as tight as possible within the movie's planned runtime, meaning that some elements of Saya's backstory needed to be cut. While the series took place in a fictional location, the movie used the real-world location of Tokyo, so Ohkawa took extra care to insert realistic details into the script. She found it difficult accommodating the wishes of both Shiotani and Fujisaku alongside her own ideas in the script.

Blood-C: The Last Dark was produced by Production I.G, creator of the Blood franchise. As with Blood-C, the project was a collaboration between Production I.G and CLAMP. The movie's production was funded by the Agency for Cultural Affairs as part of the 2011 Support Program for International Co-Production. The funding came to ¥50 million JPY—approximately US$650,000. CLAMP created the initial story draft and designed the characters. The music was composed by Naoki Satō. The production team was dubbed "Project BLOOD-C Movie". Yasuomi Umetsu, who handled the opening for the original anime, was also involved in the movie's production, handling a nude bathing scene. Aside from a shared worldview and characters, and a few staff members—Ohkawa, Fujisaku, Satō, Umetsu, and animation character designer Kazuchika Kise—the staff for the series were not involved in the production of the movie. The theme song, "Metro Baroque", was written and sung by Saya's voice actress Nana Mizuki. The song's title and lyrics drew from the movie's setting, story and characters.

Speaking about her role in voicing Saya, Mizuki said that she initially thought she would need to reimagine the entire character for her performance as Saya in the movie. It was later decided that the core character had changed little despite the events of the series finale, so Mizuki did not have to adjust her performance by much. Mizuki worked with the staff to help portray Saya's strained condition and deliberate isolation from others after the trauma of the series' events, although the sense of love still formed a strong part of Saya's character. Hashimoto's role as Mana was her first role in an anime movie, which proved challenging as Hashimoto needed to adjust to a new work environment, in particular, performing convincingly without acting physically. She accepted the part based on her liking for CLAMP's manga work, recording all her lines separate from the rest of the cast. Fukuyama voiced Watanuki, making a cameo appearance from CLAMP's manga series xxxHolic. For the character's role in The Last Dark, Fukuyama needed to portray Watanuki as a mature character despite not aging from his appearance in xxxHolic.

== Release ==
A film conclusion to the series was announced in April 2011, just a month after the series was announced. The film's theatrical release date—June 2, 2012—was announced in a post-credit teaser during the final episode of Blood-C. Its official title was announced in late 2011. The opening minutes of the film were streamed by Yahoo! Japan in May 2012. It was distributed by Shochiku. A novelization written by Fujisaku was released on June 2, 2012. The cover illustration was handled by CLAMP. Western screenings of the film took place at the Scotland Loves Animation film festival in 2012, and in France at the Annecy International Animated Film Festival and L'Étrange Festival in 2013.

=== Home media ===
The film's home video release in Japan was handled by Aniplex. It released on DVD and Blu-ray on February 27, 2013. In North America, the anime was licensed by Funimation, who also created the English dub. The DVD and Blu-ray versions released in North America on October 22, 2013. It was released in Australia by Madman Entertainment on January 15, 2014. In the United Kingdom, it was released by Manga Entertainment on March 24, 2014. A special release exclusive to HMV featured the movie on a Blu-ray/DVD double play in a slip case, a poster, and four art cards featuring visuals from the movie. In 2020, Anime Limited announced that it had relicensed the movie, and released it alongside the TV series on Blu-ray on August 29, 2022.

== Reception ==
=== Box office ===
The Last Dark opened in 24 cinemas in Japan. During its debut weekend in Japanese theaters, The Last Dark opened at #10 in Box Office Mojo's cinema charts, making ¥32,037,000—approximately $409,000, with a per-screen average taking of $16,667. The following weekend, the movie had dropped to #14 with further takings of $202,875, bringing its total gross to $846,261. The movie was awarded the jury's L'Écran Fantastique Prize at the 2012 Fantasia International Film Festival.

=== Critical reception ===
Carl Kimlinger of Anime News Network gave the movie's subbed and dubbed versions a "B+". He praised the narrative for its tone and efforts to "roll back" from the tone and gruesome violence of the series, but felt that it was impacted by the need to conclude the story of Blood-C and the incorporation of emotional scenes negatively impacted the movie's pacing in the second half. Kimlinger gave unreserved praise for Production I.G's illustration and animation, only faulting the CGI segments and expression limitations of CLAMP's character designs. He also praised Satō's musical score. THEM Anime gave the film 3/5 stars, enjoying its animation quality and action choreography despite some pacing issues. Despite this, he found the whole experience lacking and referred to the overall plot as "by-the-numbers".

Kotaku's Richard Eisenbeis was critical of the movie's tonal shift from the original series and the implied lesbian elements in Saya and Mana's character arc, and criticized the crossover with xxxHolic as low-quality fan service. He also panned the supporting cast as weak and faulted the lack of character motivation. He praised the movie's animation and the way it worked despite the predominantly dark setting, but found the CGI segments jarring. He concluded his review by calling the movie "an incredible disappointment". Paul Risker of Starburst gave The Last Dark a score of 6/10, calling the movie "a perfectly adequate sequel and even a decent enough standalone film", but advised that it should be watched as the conclusion to Blood-C rather than a standalone project. He praised the animation and Saya's characterization, but found the ending lackluster and the overall movie disappointing when compared to the original Blood: The Last Vampire.

Toon Zone noted Shiotani's lack of a particular directing style, saying that it ultimately hurt the script and added nothing to the movie: main praise was given to the animation, aside from the CGI sequences, and Satō's more forceful and heroic musical score. It praised the story as "moving yet intense" despite Fumito's lack of presence, saying that it provided suitable closure for Saya and the storyline of Blood-C, but noting that it seemed to be designed as an apology to fans who were upset by the series' unconventional tone—this was noted in both the more sympathetic supporting cast, Saya's altered presentation, and the general toning down of blood and gore. The site ultimately felt that this attitude meant the conclusion was rushed and that the final battle was an unwise departure from the Blood franchise's previous realism.

Kimlinger found the English dub serviceable despite being "fueled more by fidelity and professionalism than affection or enthusiasm", and noted a lack of extra features for series fans. Toon Zone praised both the original Japanese voice track and the English dub, but also noted the meager extras despite praising McFarland's commentary as informative about the dubbing process.
