= Chris Burnett =

American voice actor

- Other name: Patrick W. Reid
- Occupation: Voice actor
- Years active: 2002–present
- Spouse: Janna Burnett
- Website: www.chrisburnettvoiceactor.com

Chris Burnett is an American voice actor. He has provided voices for a number of English-language versions of Japanese anime. He can be seen, alongside Marisha Ray, as one of the hosts for GameStop TV. He is best known for playing Romeo in Romeo x Juliet and Koichi Aizawa in Nabari no Ou.

== Filmography ==
=== Anime ===
List of dubbing performances in anime
Year	Title	Role	Notes	Source
2015	Assassination Classroom	Hiroto Maehara		
2012	Blood-C	Itsuki Tomofusa		
2016	Divine Gate	Aoto		
2016	First Love Monster	Kota Shinohara		
2014	Hal	Hal		
2018	Junji Ito Collection	Yuji	Ep. 4	
2014	Kamisama Kiss	Kotaro Urashima		
2013	Last Exile: Fam, the Silver Wing	Dinesh		
2009	Nabari no Ou	Koichi Aizawa		
2014	Red Data Girl	Masumi Sōda		
2010	Rideback	Dota Kawai		
2009	Romeo x Juliet	Romeo Montague		
2012	Shiki	Toru Muto		
2015	Unbreakable Machine-Doll	Loki		
2017	Yamada-kun and the Seven Witches	Shinichi Tamaki		
