= Blood: The Last Vampire =

2000 film by Hiroyuki Kitakubo

- Theatrical release poster
- Type: Anime film
- Genre: Action; Horror
- Created by: Production I.G
- Directed by: Hiroyuki Kitakubo
- Screenplay by: Kenji Kamiyama
- Character designer: Katsuya Terada
- Music by: Yoshihiro Ike
- Voices of: Youki Kudoh
- Country of origin: Japan
- Original language: English; Japanese

Production
- Art director: Yūsuke Takeda
- Sound director: Keiichi Momose
- Cinematographer: Miki Sakuma
- Color designer: Katsue Inoue
- CG director: Tokumitsu Kifune
- Editor: Hiroshi Okuda
- Studios: Production I.G; IG Plus
- Executive producers: Akira Sato; Mitsuhisa Ishikawa; Ryūzo Shirakawa
- Producers: Ryuji Mitsumoto; Yukio Nagasaki
- Production companies: Production I.G; Aniplex; IPA; Sony Computer Entertainment
- Distributor: Sony Pictures Entertainment
- Runtime: 48 minutes

Original release
- Release: November 18, 2000

Related
- Manga

Blood the Last Vampire 2002
- Written by: Benkyo Tamaoki
- Published by: Kadokawa Shoten
- English publisher: NA: Viz Media
- Magazine: Monthly Ace Next
- Published: April 2001
- Light novel

Night of the Beasts
- Written by: Mamoru Oshii
- Published by: Kadokawa
- English publisher: NA: Dark Horse Press
- Published: November 2000
- Light novel

The Blood Which Invites the Darkness
- Written by: Junichi Fujisaku
- Published by: Kadokawa
- Published: January 2001
- Light novel

A Tragic Dream in Shanghai
- Written by: Junichi Fujisaku
- Published by: Kadokawa
- Published: December 2005
- Video game
- Developer: Sony Computer Entertainment Japan
- Publisher: Sony Computer Entertainment
- Genre: Horror, Adventure
- Platform: PlayStation 2, PlayStation Portable
- Released: December 21, 2000; January 26, 2006 (PSP)
- Related
- Blood+ (2005–06 anime television series); Blood: The Last Vampire (2009 live-action film adaptation); Blood-C (2011 anime television series)

Blood: The Last Vampire (Note: In katakana: ブラッド•ザ•ラスト•ヴァンパイア (Buraddo Za Rasuto Vanpaia)) (stylized in all caps) is a 2000 Japanese animated action horror film directed by Hiroyuki Kitakubo and written by Kenji Kamiyama; the film is created by Production I.G, who also produced the film alongside their IG Plus division. Distributed by Sony Pictures Entertainment, a girl named Saya (Youki Kudoh), who hunts the hematophagous-bat-like creatures called Chiropterans, is tasked to eliminate the creatures at Yokota Air Base by her handlers.

Blood: The Last Vampire first premiered at Fantasia International Film Festival on July 27, 2000, and later in Japan on November 18. Manga Entertainment licensed the film and released it theatrically in the United States in Summer 2001, and later on August 3 through home video release.

Blood: The Last Vampire spawned a sequel manga, three light novels and a video game from 2001 to 2006. It also spawned two anime series: Blood+, which aired from 2005 to 2006, and Blood-C in 2011. A live-action film adaptation with the same title was released in 2009.

== Plot ==
The story is set in 1966. Its main protagonist is a girl named Saya, who hunts bat-like vampiric creatures called Chiropterans. Saya is introduced on a subway train, where she assassinates a man in a suit. Her American contacts or handlers arrive. One of them, David, begins to brief Saya on another mission, while the other, Louis, discovers that the man Saya has just killed was probably not a Chiropteran.

Saya's next mission begins at the American Yokota Air Base, which is active in the buildup to the Vietnam War. At least one Chiropteran has managed to infiltrate the air base, and it is only a matter of time before they feed again, go into hibernation, and become untraceable. Saya is to pose as a school girl, infiltrate the high school adjacent to the base, and then track and kill the Chiropterans.

At the school, Saya runs into a meek nurse, Amino Makiho, on the eve of the school's annual Halloween party. Two of Saya's classmates, Sharon and Linda, make a visit to Makiho at the nurse's office. Suddenly, Saya bursts into the room, killing Linda and wounding Sharon, breaking her sword in the process. Both girls are revealed to be Chiropterans. Makiho goes into shock at the revelation. Meanwhile, a third Chiropteran reveals itself and begins making its way to the base. Back at the school, Makiho regains her nerve and pursues Sharon into a room full of dancing Americans in costume, where she finds Sharon transformed. Saya saves her and both flee into a nearby motor pool. The Chiropterans trap them inside and attack.

David delivers a new sword, and Saya uses it to kill Sharon. The final Chiropteran then decides to flee, attempting to stow away on a departing cargo plane. David and Saya give chase and she manages to strike the Chiropteran and mortally wound it. She then stands over the dying creature and lets some of her blood trickle into its mouth. Louis arrives and recovers Makiho before the local police reach her.

Afterward, Makiho is seen in an interview with government officials who question her about the night's events. However, it's revealed that all evidence of the battle between Saya and the Chiropterans has been covered up and both David and Saya have disappeared, leaving Makiho with nothing to prove the veracity of her story. Her interviewer then asks her to identify Saya in a picture which has a girl that looks identical to her, except the picture was taken in 1892. The only other description of the picture is the word "VAMPIRE". Makiho then returns to the school, where she narrates that she never really discovered the full truth behind Saya and the Chiropterans, and wonders if she's still out there fighting them.

== Characters ==
- Saya (小夜, Saya) hunts chiropterans using a katana. It is implied that she is the last remaining vampire and called "the only remaining original". Saya has no weakness to sunlight, although it is unknown if she has any of the other vulnerabilities often attributed to vampires. However, she does, become distressed when she encounters religious paraphernalia and angry when people mention God in her presence. Saya displays superhuman senses and strength, as well as cunning, resourcefulness, and skill. The manga series suggests that she was a human-vampire hybrid. Her age is unknown, but a picture of her with nine other people is shown in the film with the date 1892 and the word "vampire" attached to it. Though she holds most humans in contempt, she seems to have some sort of respect for David. Voiced by Youki Kudoh.
- David is a man working for the U.S. government. He relays missions to Saya and helps her at various points in the film. He is a Korean War veteran. Voiced by Joe Romersa.
- Lewis is David's partner that works for the U.S. Government. Voiced by Stuart Robinson.
- Amino Makiho, a stout, soft-spoken, middle-aged nurse working at the High School. Initially a target of the Chiropterans posing as students, she manages herself well despite her abject terror, pursuing the monster Sharon and even being the one to save herself and Saya from the burning jeep hangar. Voiced by Saemi Nakamura.
- Chiroptera (chiropterans or, as spoken in the film, chiropterates), from the Greek for "hand wings" (翼手 (yokushu) in Japanese), are hematophagous bat-like creatures, comparable to humans in intelligence. They disguise themselves as people and can gradually transform, becoming large, monstrous, and long-limbed. In this form, a further transformation produces leathery wings that allow the creature to glide, but not fly freely. Chiroptera live by feeding on human blood. They possess extraordinary speed and strength. They heal almost instantly from any non-lethal wound. Because of this, the only way to easily kill them is to cause them to lose a sufficiently large amount of blood from one attack.

== Production ==
Production I.G's president Mitsuhisa Ishikawa wanted to produce a new project that was an original concept rather than being an adaptation of an existing anime or manga series. He approached Mamoru Oshii, who ran a series of lectures known as the "Oshii Jyuku" for teaching new filmmakers how to create their own projects, about his idea and asked him to have his students submit ideas. The submissions of Kenji Kamiyama and Junichi Fujisaku became the basis for the upcoming film: a girl in a sailor suit wielding a samurai sword. Ishikawa suggested Yokota Air Base for the film's setting, referring to it as the "state of California within Japan". Hiroyuki Kitakubo was selected as the film's director, a position he accepted on the condition he be given artistic license with the material.

After titling the work Blood: The Last Vampire, Kitakubo chose video game designer Katsuya Terada to work on the character designs, and Kazuchika Kise as the animation director. When asked why he chose Terada instead of a regular character designer, Kitakubo stated "I personally felt he had an amazing talent; his characters have a feel to them that is universal and that is probably why he has drawn characters for video games played by people all over the world." He goes on to note that he wanted both Terada and Kise together, and would not have hired Terada had Kise not agreed to work on the project. The resulting film uses completely digital animation. Rather than following the tradition of using animation cels, the entire film was inked, colored, and then animated with computers. It also uses primarily "low light" settings, with much of the film featuring large amounts of grey and brown.

In directing the film, Kitakubo notes that his having read Dracula and watched the American television series Buffy the Vampire Slayer, they may have had some influence on the film as the rest of his life experiences have. Production I.G broke new ground in Blood: The Last Vampire by being the first company to film an anime series almost entirely in English, with Japanese subtitles, feeling that it would help the film reach foreign markets more easily.

The resulting film is very short for a theatrical work, spanning only 45 minutes. Kitakubo stated in a 2001 interview with Animerica that he had the remaining story of "Saya's past present and future [sic]" in his own mind, but that it was up to the others involved in its making as to whether there would be a sequel. Production I.G noted that they deliberately intended for it to be a three part story, with the rest of Saya's story to be carried through in a light novel trilogy and a two-volume video game.

== Release ==
The film first premiered at the 5th annual International Festival of Fantasy, Action and Genre Cinema, nicknamed Fantasia 2000, in Montreal, Quebec, Canada where it was screened for attendees on July 29, 2000. The film aired in Australia on August 26, 2000, at the Sydney 2000 Olympic Arts Festival. It made its theatrical debut in its home country of Japan on November 16, 2000.

Manga Entertainment released the film theatrically in North America in the summer of 2001, followed by VHS and DVD releases on August 26, 2001.

== Reception ==
Blood: The Last Vampire received multiple awards at various film festivals around the world. In 2000, it was selected as "Public's Prize Best Asia Feature Film" at the Montreal Fantasia Film Festival where it debuted, it won the Grand Prize in the animation category at the Japanese Agency for Cultural Affairs' Media Arts Festival, and it won the Ofuji Noburo Award at the Mainichi Film Competition. In 2001, it won Special Prize at the akasaki Film Festival and it was selected as the Best Theatrical Feature Film at the World Animation Celebration. Director Hiroyuki Kitakubo won an award for his work on the film at 6th Animation Kobe. It received the Grand Prize for animation at the 2000 Japan Media Arts Festival.

In the first week of its North American release, more than 70,000 DVD and 30,000 VHS copies of Blood: The Last Vampire had been sold. Within the first month after its release, it became Manga Entertainment's top selling title in the company's history. The film also appeared on both the Video Business, Billboard, Video Store Magazine and Entertainment Weekly lists of top DVD sales. The company attributes this success to their use of two unconventional marketing methods: a limited theatrical release before the DVD release to market the title and offering the entire film for free on the day the DVD was released through a streaming video broadcast on Sputnik7.com where it was downloaded by more than 61,000 viewers. Marvin Gleicher, then president of Manga Entertainment, stated that the film's "success has proven to be a landmark time in the history of Manga Entertainment."

Michael Stroud of Wired News praised the film's blend of 2D and 3D elements and quoted Academy Award winning director James Cameron as saying: "Digital imaging has entered a new era. The world will come to consider this work as the standard of top quality in digital animation." In The Anime Encyclopedia, Jonathan Clements and Helen McCarthy praised the film for its groundbreaking use of English, its "stunning animation" and its high end action sequences, but criticized its short length and lack of a conclusion. Animerica reviewer Urian Brown called it a "piece of superb animation" that a "pretty and gritty ... sleek, dark, and sexy" film that will make a viewer forget its lack of "story, depth, and character development."

According to Electronic Gaming Monthly, Blood: The Last Vampire was one influence behind the "striking visuals" of the video game Crackdown. Cinefantastique listed the anime as one of the "10 Essential Animations".

The review aggregator website Rotten Tomatoes reported that 50% of critics have given the film a positive review based on 16 reviews, with an average rating of 5.03/10. On Metacritic, the film has a weighted average score of 44 out of 100 based on 6 critics, indicating "mixed or average" reviews.

== Related media ==
=== Manga ===
Using a concept from Mamoru Oshii, Production I.G had Benkyo Tamaoki write a sequel to Blood: The Last Vampire to complete the story. It brings Saya to the year 2002, with a new generation of handlers and continuing her quest to destroy chiropterans. Appropriately named Blood: The Last Vampire 2000 (ブラッド ザ・ラストヴァンパイア2000, Buraddo Za Rasuto Vanpaia 2000), the single-volume title was published in Japan by Kadokawa Shoten on May 1, 2001. It was licensed and released in English in North America by Viz Media under the title Blood: The Last Vampire 2002 on November 5, 2002. In the manga, David has retired and Saya has a new handler who makes it abundantly clear that he has no respect for her. He sends her to Jinkōsen Shūritsu Valley High School under the name of "Saya Otonashi". There, she learns that chiropterans co-existed with humans, until humans began experimenting on them in the 19th century to try to gain immortality. The experiments increased the chiropterans' killing instinct and removed their former regard for humanity. Scientists, in turn, developed twin anti-chiropteran weapons. Maya, a prototype, still required blood and could transform like other chiropteran. The second, Saya, did not need to drink blood and had no transformation abilities so she was considered the perfected weapon. Maya searches for Saya, desiring to have Saya eat her so they can become one pure-blood chiropteran. After this meeting, Maya's body cannot be found, but it is never shown if Saya granted her request. Saya kills her handler and walks off into the night.

=== Light novels ===
A trilogy of light novels have been created in relation to Blood: the Last Vampire and published by Kadokawa. Published in Japan in October 2000, Blood: The Last Vampire: Night of the Beasts (ブラッド・ザ・ラストバンパイヤ 獣たちの夜, Kemonotachi no Yoru) was written by Mamoru Oshii. It was published in English in North America by DH Press on November 23, 2005.

The second novel, Blood: The Last Vampire: The Blood Which Invites the Darkness (ブラッド・ザ・ラストバンパイヤ 闇を誘う血, Yami o Izanau Chi) was written by Junichi Fujisaku, who also directed the spin-off Blood+ anime series. This was published in January 2001.

The third novel, also written by Fujisaku, is Blood: The Last Vampire: A Tragic Dream in Shanghai (ブラッド・ザ・ラストバンパイヤ 上海哀儚, Shanhai Aibyō) and was published in July 2001.

=== Video games ===
In 2000, Production I.G and Sony Computer Entertainment Japan co-produced a two-volume Blood: The Last Vampire video game. The game features a musical score by Yuki Kajiura with Youki Kudoh reprising her role as the voice of Saya, and over two hours of theater quality animation. It is a graphical adventure that brings Saya and her hunt for Chiropterans to Tokyo in 2000. There she meets a seventeen-year-old boy who begins wondering about Saya and the history of "Blood". Both volumes of the game were released to the PlayStation 2 in Japan on December 21, 2000. Famitsu magazine scored the first volume a 33 out of 40. Animerica's Dr. Brown called the original game "boring", but did compliment it for having "beautifully animated sequences".

In 2006, Production I.G and Sony re-released the game. Both volumes were combined into a single game for the PlayStation Portable (PSP). The game was called Yarudora Series Vol. 5: Blood: The Last Vampire (やるドラ ポータブル Blood the Last Vampire, Yarudora Potaburu: Buraddo: Za Rasuto Vanpaia; lit. "Yarudora Portable: Blood: The Last Vampire") and was released in Japan on January 26, 2006. The combined game included new cover art and additional features, including a strategy flow chart, a digital art gallery, and some exclusive films.

=== Live-action film ===
In May 2006, Bill Kong, producer of Crouching Tiger, Hidden Dragon and Hero, announced that he was producing a live-action film adaptation of Blood: The Last Vampire, directed by Ronny Yu, and, like the source anime film, primarily filmed in English rather than Japanese. The film's setting is 1970 at a United States Air Force Base in Tokyo, during the Vietnam War. Early reports indicated that the film's plot will feature Saya as a 400-year-old half human-half vampire who hunts full blooded vampires, both to rid the world of them and as they are her only source for food. She works with an organization known only as "The Council". Normally a loner, Saya forms a friendship with a young girl she meets at an American military base while preparing to battle Onigen, the highest ranking of the vampires.

Kong and Yu originally planned to finance the project themselves, but in November 2006, Production I.G officially consented to the film and began offering financial support. Through ties to Manga Entertainment, the French company Pathé became the film's production company. Yu was retained as its producer, but Chris Nahon took over as the film's director. Korean actress Jun Ji-hyun, who adopted her English screen name Gianna Jun for the release, plays the role of Saya. Rather than being paid a straight license, Production I.G will receive a percentage of all revenues generated by the film.

Originally slated to be released worldwide in spring 2008, the film premiered in Japan on May 29, 2009, under the title Last Blood (ラスト・ブラッド, Rasuto Buraddo). The film was released in the United Kingdom on June 26, 2009. Sony Pictures licensed the film for release in North America, where it was released to theaters by Samuel Goldwyn Films on July 10, 2009.

=== Spin-off anime series ===
In 2005, Sony and Production I.G announced the creation of Blood+, a fifty-episode anime television series. It is held to be an alternate universe telling of Blood: The Last Vampire; it has only minor connections and similarities to the film, and many differences. Blood+ premiered in Japan on October 8, 2005, on MBS/TBS and aired until September 23, 2006. The series was written and directed by Junichi Fujisaku and features original character designs by Chizu Hashii. Through Sony's international division, Blood+ was licensed for distribution in multiple regions. In the United States, the series was broadcast as part of Cartoon Network's Adult Swim from March 11, 2007, until March 23, 2008. The anime became its own franchise, with two light novel series adaptations, three manga adaptations, and two video games.

In 2011, manga artist group CLAMP and Production I.G announced their collaboration of the twelve-episode anime television series called Blood-C. This spin-off series is also set in different universe from the film and the previous anime, and only shares the main character, having katana as her main weapon, and basic premise of her defeating monsters with that sword. CLAMP provided the story and original character designs, Tsutomu Mizushima directed the series, Nanase Ohkawa of CLAMP handled the series' scripts, and Junichi Fujisaku co-wrote the scripts and supervised the series. The series aired on Japanese television from July 8, 2011, to September 30, 2011. The sequel anime film, Blood-C: The Last Dark was released in theaters on June 2, 2012. The anime also became its own franchise, with two novelizations, two manga adaptations, a stage play, and three live-action films.

== See also ==
- Vampire film
