= Watanabe Productions =

Multimedia management company in Japan

Watanabe Productions Co., Ltd.
- Native name: 株式会社渡辺プロダクション
- Type: Kabushiki gaisha (Joint-stock company)
- Traded as: Unlisted
- Industry: Service industry (entertainment)
- Genre: Tarento management Entertainment
- Founded: April 3, 1959
- Founder: Shin Watanabe
- Headquarters: Shibuya Infos Annex, 12-10, Sakuragaokacho, Shibuya, Tokyo, Japan; ZIP 150-0091
- Area served: Japan
- Key people: Masaki Yoshida (Representative chairman); Mayumi Watanabe (Representative president)
- Subsidiaries: Watanabe Entertainment Co., Ltd. TOP COAT Co., Ltd. THE WORKS Co., Ltd. and more
- Website: www.watanabe-group.com

Watanabe Productions Co., Ltd. (株式会社渡辺プロダクション, Kabushiki-gaisha Watanabe Purodakushon) is a multimedia management company in Japan dealing in recordings, films, television, music publishing and artist management as well as the main subsidiary of the Watanabe Production Group.

Formed by bandleader Shin Watanabe and his wife Misa Watanabe in 1955, the company has become one of the most influential of its kind in Japan. It is referred to informally in Japanese as Nabe-pro (ナベプロ, nabepuro).

== Talent clients ==
=== Current ===
- Sayaka Aoki
- Mickey Curtis
- D-Boys

- Hirofumi Araki
- Takahisa Maeyama
- Masashi Mikami
- Shuto Miyazaki
- Masaki Nakao
- Jun Shison
- Hiroki Suzuki
- Masahiro Usui
- Masato Wada
- Yuki Yamada

- Ryo Fukawa
- Taizo Harada
- Nora Hirano
- Ayako Imoto
- Yuki Kashiwagi
- Masaki Kaji
- Yoshiko Kuga
- Tamiyo Kusakari
- Little Glee Monster
- Sei Matobu
- Akiko Matsumoto
- Toshiaki Megumi
- Shoko Nakagawa
- Mie Nakao
- Nokko
- Rag Fair
- Saori Seto
- Yuichi Tsuchiya
- Hitoshi Ueki

=== Former ===
- Osamu Adachi
- Candies
- Yuya Endo
- Shunji Igarashi
- Yukiko Iwai
- Sonoko Kawai
- The Lillies
- Takahisa Maeyama
- Tetsuya Makita
- Alan Merrill
- Shingo Nakagawa
- Masaya Nakamura
- Yūichi Nakamura
- The Peanuts
- Kenji Sawada
- Kōji Seto
- Atsushi Shiramata
- Yu Shirota
- Ryuki Takahashi
- Kei Tani
- Kotaro Yanagi
- Tomo Yanagishita
- Reiko Ohara

=== Foreign publishing and licensing rights ===
- David Bowie
- Deep Purple
- Golden Half
- Led Zeppelin
- Queen

== Group subsidiaries ==
- Watanabe Entertainment Co., Ltd.
- Watanabe Music Publishing Co., Ltd.
- Watanabe Kikaku Co., Ltd.
- Izawa Office Co., Ltd.
- Iwappara Ski Resort
- The Works Co., Ltd.
- Sound City Co., Ltd.
- Watanabe Enterprise Co., Ltd.
- Mates Co., Ltd.
- Mania Mania Inc.
- Top Coat Co., Ltd.
- Watanabe Music Culture Forum Foundation
