= Hiroki Suzuki (actor, born 1983) =

Japanese actor

- 鈴木 裕樹
- Born: October 3, 1983 (age 42); Iwate Prefecture, Japan
- Occupation: Actor
- Years active: 2004–present
- Height: 180 cm (5 ft 11 in)
- Website: www.watanabepro.co.jp/mypage/10000021/

Hiroki Suzuki (鈴木 裕樹, Suzuki Hiroki; born October 3, 1983) is a Japanese actor from Kitakami, Iwate. He is best known for his roles as Shuichiro Oishi in The Prince of Tennis (musical series, Tenimyu, live film adaptation), and as Jyan Kandou (Geki Red) in the tokusatsu television series, Juken Sentai Gekiranger. He is also part of a young men's stage acting troupe, D-Boys, which perform in various skit-like performances.

== Career ==
He has appeared in a various number of TV shows.

On January 1, 2006, Suzuki, with fellow D-Boys member Masaki Kaji, appeared on the broadcast of Secret New Years' Performance Tournament "Young Man Colosseum", where both boys were able to display their acrobatic abilities. In 2007, Suzuki will again appear on the New Year's Day 44th broadcast of Secret New Years' Performance Tournament's "Chinese Lion Dance" segment, with Masaki Kaji and fellow D-Boys members Yuya Endo, Masato Wada, and Yuuma Minakawa.

Next, he appeared as a member of The Tigers, in the TV drama The Hit Parade, which aired May 26, 2006 on Fuji TV and co-starred fellow D-Boys members Masato Wada, Yuu Shirota, Masaki Kaji, Hirofumi Araki, Yuya Endo, and Kōji Seto.

=== With the D-Boys ===
In October 2004, Suzuki joined the Watanabe Entertainment group named the D-Boys.

As a member of the D-Boys, Suzuki also keeps a blog, which he updates occasionally.

On August 6, 2005, Suzuki, along with fellow D-Boys member Masaki Kaji, appeared on the radio program Marvelous Radio Vibration, hosted by fellow D-Boys members Yuu Shirota and Kotaro Yanagi.

The D-Boys so far have released two Photobooks. The first photobook released on April 27, 2005, was self-titled D-Boys, while the second, released on March 15, 2006, was called Start, both of which contain many photos of Suzuki.

The D-Boys have also starred in their own drama documentary variety series called, DD-Boys in which Suzuki's appeared in various episodes as himself. The show was 24 episodes long and ran from April 10 to September 25, 2006.

In June 2007, the D-Boys starred in their very own musical together called, D-Boys Stage, which ran from June 3 to June 10 at the Space Zero theater in Tokyo. Suzuki appeared in the musical as a guest performer, making select appearances on June 6 and June 9.

=== As Shuichiro Oishi in The Prince of Tennis musicals ===
Suzuki won the role of Shuichiro Oishi, the motherly vice-captain regular of Seigaku Middle School's tennis club, in The Prince of Tennis musicals, Tenimyu. From 2005 to 2006, he became the second actor to play Oishi as part of the second generation Seigaku cast. He made his debut as Oishi on January 8, 2005 in the Side Yamabuki performance in Osaka. That same year, his role as Oishi was carried into the live adaptation film of the manga. During his run in the musicals, he was able to work with fellow D-Boys members Yuya Endo, Kotaro Yanagi, Masaki Kaji, Osamu Adachi, Hirofumi Araki, Masato Wada, and former member Yuu Shirota.

On March 29, 2006, in the Dream Live 3rd concert, Suzuki, along with the majority of the Seigaku cast, graduated from their roles. Since his graduation, the role of Oishi has been played by Yukihiro Takiguchi, Yuya Toyoda and Yuki Tsujimoto, and currently by actor Jin Hiramaki.

=== As Shuichiro Oishi in The Prince of Tennis live-action film ===
Suzuki was able to carry on his role from the musicals to the live-adaptation film of the manga series of The Prince of Tennis. He, along with most of the principal cast members for the Seigaku Regulars, were able to reprise their roles in the movie. The only major casting change was the casting of Kanata Hongo as Ryoma Echizen, the main protagonist. The Prince of Tennis was released on May 13, 2006 and opened on the tenth spot in the Japanese Box Office and marked Suzuki's first appearance in the film industry.

=== In June Bride ===
Suzuki's next movie, the June Bride (Jyun Bride) opened on May 27, 2006. He played one of the supporting characters, costarring with fellow D-Boys members Yuu Shirota and Hirofumi Araki. The movie's based on the original manga Jun Bride, by Yoshida Satoshi.

=== In Limit~ What's Your Story? ===
From June 2 to June 4, 2006, Suzuki starred in the play, Limit~ What's Your Story?~ (limit〜あなたの物語は何ですか?〜, Limit~ anata no monogatari wa nan desu ka?~), as one of the main characters, appearing alongside fellow D-Boys Araki Hirofumi and Yuichi Nakamura.

=== As Geki Red in Juken Sentai Gekiranger ===
On February 18, 2007, Suzuki starred as Jyan Kandou aka Geki Red, a Gekiranger who was brought up by tigers and befriended by pandas so that his senses have become sharply enhanced to feel with his body, rather than the brain in the Super Sentai series called Juken Sentai Gekiranger (adapted as Power Rangers: Jungle Fury in America), which premiered on TV Asahi. The show also costars Suzuki's fellow D-Boys member, Hirofumi Araki, as Jyan's rival, Rio, the "Black Lion".

=== Photobook and Idol DVD ===
It was announced then that Suzuki, along with Hirofumi Araki and Kōji Seto would be getting solo photobooks and DVDs called the "Prince Series." Suzuki's solo photobook would be released on April 19, 2007 while his solo idol DVD would be released on May 16, 2007. The three of them will be following Yuu Shirota, Yuya Endo, Kotaro Yanagi and Shunji Igarashi as the only D-Boys that have released an idol DVD while following Kotaro Yanagi, Shunji Igarashi and later, Yuu Shirota, as the only D-Boys to have released a solo photobook.

== Personal life ==
Suzuki keeps a blog on his D-Boys webpage, which he updates occasionally. Some years ago, in his blog entries, he liked to call himself "Snufkin" after one of his favorite animated characters, but he is most often called Zukki (a nickname created by Masato Wada) by fans and other D-Boys.

== Filmography ==
Title	Role	Broadcast date	Network	Notes
The Prince of Tennis	Shuichiro Oishi	2006, May		Movie
The June Bride		2006, May		Movie
DD-Boys	Various characters	2006, April ~ September		TV series - Appears in episodes 2, 4, 6, 10-11, 17-19, 22, 23
The Hit Parade	Member of The Tigers	2006, May		TV drama
Silent	Yuu Sudou	2006, July		Direct-to-video film
Shinrei Shashin Kitan (心霊写真奇譚)	Kojima	2006, July		Direct-to-video film - Appears in Omoide no Polaroid, story 3
Regatta		2006, July		TV drama - Appears in episode 3
Cupid no Itazura	Kurogi Uke	2006, October		TV drama
Juken Sentai Gekiranger	Jyan Kandou/Geki Red	2007, February ~ 2008, February		TV series (Tokusatsu)
Juken Sentai Gekiranger: Nei-Nei! Hou-Hou! Hong Kong Decisive Battle	Jyan Kandou/Geki Red	2007, August		Movie (Tokusatsu)
Juken Sentai Gekiranger Special DVD: Gyun-Gyun! Kensei Daiundoukai	Jyan Kandou/Geki Red	2007, December		Special DVD (Tokusatsu)
Juken Sentai Gekiranger vs Boukenger	Jyan Kandou/Geki Red	2008, March		Direct-to-video film (Tokusatsu)
Ando Natsu	Masato Morita	2008, July		TV drama - Appears in episode 4
Shakariki!	Hirohiko Yuta	2008, September		Movie
Team Batista no Eiko	Toshiki Sakai	2008, October ~ December		TV drama
Suzuki Hiroki in Making of Hyakkaryouran	himself	2008, October		Making of DVD
Ooku Hyakkaryoran	Tokugawa Iemitsu	2008, November		Movie - from the Taiga Roman Series Trilogy
Zeni Geba	Jun Sugeta	2009, January ~ March		TV drama
Engine Sentai Go-onger vs. Gekiranger	Jyan Kandou/Geki Red	2009, January		Movie (Tokusatsu)
Ju-on: Shiroi Rojo	Hagimoto Fumiya	2009, June		Movie
Tonari no Shibafu		2009, July		TV drama - Appears in episodes 1 and 3
Karei Naru Spy	Boy in swimming club	2009, August		TV drama - Appears in episode 4
Ikemen Shin Sobaya Tantei: Iindaze!		2009, August		TV drama - Appears in episode 8
Sono Otoko, Fukushocho	Takeshi Miyashita	2009, October ~ December		TV drama - Season 3
GeGeGe no Nyōbō	Taichi Kobayashi	2010, April ~ September		TV drama
Koi no Tadashii Hōhō wa Hon nimo Sekkeizu nimo Notteinai	Neru Yonetani	2010, October		Mobile drama/Online drama/Movie
Kaizoku Sentai Gokaiger	Jyan Kandou	2011, April		TV series (Tokusatsu) - Guest appearance in episode 7
Moshidora	Masayoshi Nikai	2011, June		Movie
Sengyō Shufu Tantei: Watashi wa Shadow	Shinichi Yokozawa	2011, November		TV drama - Appears in episode 4
QP	Kono	2011, November		TV drama - Appears in episodes 7-11
Anata mo Artist	himself	2011, December ~ 2012, January		TV series
Suzuko no Koi	Ryōta Sakamaki	2012, January ~ March		TV drama
Taiyō wa Mattekurenai	Hikari Eguchi	2012, May		TV drama/Online drama/Movie - Second story of the DxTown series
Hanchō 5: Keishichō Azumihan	Shuuji Kadowaki	2012, May		TV drama - Appears in episode 8
Keishichō Sōsa Ichikachō	Kazuma Amagasa	2012, July		TV drama
Kanshiki Tokusōhan - Kujō Reiko 2	Sarumata	2012, October		TV drama
Hyakunen no Tokei	Kenji Mizobuchi	2012, October		Movie
Himawari - Okinawa wa Wasurenai, Ano Nichi no Sora o		2013, January		Movie
Yakō Kanransha		2013, January		TV drama - Appears in episodes 1, 3 and 5
Suzuki Hiroki no Hatsuchōsen! Nanatsu no Undōnōryoku o Kitaeru Coordination-training	himself	2013, January		TV program
Kami no Maioriru Yama ~ Hayachinesan to Kagurashu		2013, March		TV program
Zuki Ara: Don't Trust Over 30	himself	2013, April		TV series
Zuki Ara: Don't Think, Just Feel	himself	2013, August		TV series
Oretachi no Ashita		2013, autumn		Movie
Taishibōkei Tanita no Shainshokudō		2013, May		Movie
Garasu no Ie	Morita Fumihiko	2013, September ~ October		TV drama
Tetsujin Ganriser NEO	Hitakami Arata	2014, July ~ October		TV series (Tokusatsu)
Bittersweet ~Otona no Kousaten~	manager of a musician	2014, October		Online short movie - Appears on the episode called "Akikohen"
Suteki na Sen TAXI		2014, December		TV drama - Appears in episode 10
Aibō - Season 13	Yuichiro Kaji	2014, October ~ 2015, March		TV drama - Appears in episode 19
Kyoto Ninjou Sousa Fairu		2015, April ~ June		TV drama - Appears in episode 5
Tetsujin Ganriser NEO 2	Hitakami Arata	2015, August ~ November		TV series (Tokusatsu)
Kasouken no Onna - Season 15	Yuuma Gotou	2015, October ~ 2016, March		TV drama - Appears in episode 10
Keishichō Sōsa Ichikachō	Kazuma Amagasa	2016, April ~ June		TV drama
Ie Uru Onna (Your Home is my Business)	Hachinohe Daisuke	2016, July ~ September		TV drama
Tetsujin Ganriser Heroes	Hitakami Arata	2016, July ~ October		TV series (Tokusatsu)
Hagure Shochou no Satsujin Kyuukou		2016, December		TV drama - Appears in episode 1 ("Kujuukurihama Meikyuu Daiya")
Hakkutsu! Otakara Gareria	himself	2016		TV series
Kirawareru Yuuki	Yuusuke Sano	2017		TV drama - Appears in episode 8
Keishichō Sōsa Ichikachō - Season 2	Kazuma Amagasa	2017, April ~ June		TV drama
Happiness	Inoue	2017		Movie
Kaette Kita Ie Uru Onna	Hachinohe Daisuke	2017, May		TV drama
Sugamo Kyukyu 2030		2017		Short movie
Ultraman Geed	Kuruto	2017, July ~ December		TV series (Tokusatsu) - Appears in episodes 14 and 15
Joshi Teki Seikatsu (Life as a Girl)	Toshio Ogawa	2018, January	NHK	TV drama - Appears in episode 3
Unnatural	Keigo Tachibana	2018, January	TBS	TV drama - Appears in episode 6
Keishichō Sōsa Ichikachō - Season 3	Kazuma Amagasa	2018, April ~ June	TV Asahi	TV drama
Chat Lady no Kiseki	Canon / Fujiki	2018, May		Movie
Keishichō Sōsa Ichikachō Special (2018)	Kazuma Amagasa	2018, July	TV Asahi	Special TV episode
Maji de Koukai Shitemasu ~Second Season~		2018, August		TV drama - Appears in episode 3
Nishimura Kyotaro Suspense Totsugawa Keibu Series		2018, September		TV drama - Appears in episode 6 ("Nikkou · Koi to Uragiri no Kinugawa")
Ten: Tenhōdōri No Kaidanji	a security guard	2018, October		TV drama - Appears in episodes 1-4
Dai Ren'ai ~ Boku wo Wasureru Kimi to	a doctor	2018, October 12 ~ December 14	TBS	TV drama - Appears in episodes 3 and 4
Keishichō Sōsa Ichikachō Special (January 2019)	Kazuma Amagasa	2019, January 6	TV Asahi	Special TV episode
Ie Uru Onna no Gyakushu	Hachinohe Daisuke	2019, January 9 ~ March 13	Nippon TV	TV drama
Ano Yoru Kara Kimi ni Koishiteta	Tachibana	2019, March 7		Mini drama featured in the Japanese app Watchy
Keishichō Sōsa Ichikachō Special (April 2019)	Kazuma Amagasa	2019, April 21	TV Asahi	Special TV episode
Kesennuma city promotional video	himself	2019, May 26		Promotional video - available on Youtube
Keishichō Sōsa Ichikachō New Special I (July 7th, 2019)	Kazuma Amagasa	2019, July 7	TV Asahi	Special TV episode
Keishichō Sōsa Ichikachō New Special II (July 14th, 2019)	Kazuma Amagasa	2019, July 14	TV Asahi	Special TV episode
Keishichō Sōsa Ichikachō Special (October 2019)	Kazuma Amagasa	2019, October 13	TV Asahi	Special TV episode
ZukiAra Fukkatsu	himself	2019, October 14	AbemaTV Special 2	Streaming TV show
Tetsujin Ganriser NEO Saga	Hitakami Arata	2019, October 20 (ongoing)	TV Iwate	TV series (Tokusatsu) - Episodes 1 and 2 available on Ganriser official YT channel
Keishichō Sōsa Ichikachō Special (December 2019)	Kazuma Amagasa	2019, December 15	TV Asahi	Special TV episode
Obento Letter	himself	2019, December 22	TV Asahi	TV program
Keishichō Sōsa Ichikachō New Year Special	Kazuma Amagasa	2020, January 3	TV Asahi	Special TV episode
The Toppa File		2020, January 9	Nippon TV	TV Variety show
Keishichō Sōsa Ichikachō 2020	Kazuma Amagasa	2020, April 9	TV Asahi	TV drama
The Quiet Don		2023, May 12		Live-action film

== Stage ==
Title	Role	Performance date
The Prince of Tennis Musical: Side Yamabuki feat. St Rudolph	Shuichiro Oishi	Winter of 2004-2005
The Prince of Tennis Musical: Dream Live 2nd	Shuichiro Oishi	2005
The Prince of Tennis Musical: The Imperial Match Hyotei Gakuen	Shuichiro Oishi	Winter of 2005-2006
The Prince of Tennis Musical: The Imperial Match Hyotei Gakuen in Winter	Shuichiro Oishi	2006
The Prince of Tennis Musical: Dream Live 3rd	Shuichiro Oishi	2006
Limit: What Is Your Story?		2006, June 2–4
Sophistry (ソフィストリー~Philosophism~ (ソフィストリー〜詭弁〜))		2006, August 31 - September 10
Out of Order Live Entertainment Show		2007, March 24
D-Boys Stage Vol.1 - Kanbai Orei	Saburō Nagatsuka / Ryōma Sakamoto	2007, June 6 and June 9
D-Boys Stage Vol.2 - Last Game	Kazuya Kasai	2008, June 20–27 and July 5–6
D-Boys Stage Vol.3 - Karasu 04	Hosoya Jūdayū Naohide	2009, April 12–18 and 23-25
D-Boys Stage 2010 trial-2 - Last Game	Kazuya Kasai	2010, August 26 - September 5 and September 9–12
D-Boys Stage 2010 trial-3 - America	Ikeda	2010, September 29 - October 3, October 19–20, 22-24, 31 and November 3–7
D-Boys Stage 2011 - Venice no Shōnin	Lorenzo	2011, April 29 - May 8 and May 13–15
Gekidan Baccas - "Stand by My"	Buchi (script by Hiroki Suzuki)	2011, June 1–4
Love Letters 2012 Spring Special with Erina Mano	Andrew Makepeace Ladd III	2012, March 12
D-Ste 11th - Cool no Tanjō	Keisuke Yabe	2012, August 25–26, September 4–10 and 12-17
Ukauka Sanjū Chorochoro Yonjū	Gonzu	2013, May 8 - June 2
D-Ste 14th - Jūniya	Sir Andrew Aguecheek	2013, October 4–13 and 17-20
Yuhiden	Madara	2015, October 22 - November 1 and November 21–22
Intaiya Lily		2016, February 18 - March 7
Kansu Domino		2017, October 4–15, 21, 22, 24, 26, November 5, 6 and 10-12
Otamajakushi	Ken'ichi Komori	2018, February 1–12 and 15-18
Reader's theatre Cyrano	Cyrano de Bergerac	2018, August 8
LOOSER ~ Ushinai Tsuzuketeshimau Album ~	Hijikata Toshizō and other roles	2019, June 6–9 and 15-16
Reader's theatre Dragon Zakura	Kuriyama Shouta	2019, July 13
Reader's theatre Yose Kara Hajimaru Koibanashi		2019, October 31
Cliche	Sam Akaike	2020, January 29 - February 2
Takufes - Hotoke no Kao mo Warau Made		scheduled for 2020, April 22–29, May 9, 10, 14, 16, 20-24 - Cancelled due to Covid-19

== Radio ==
- D-Radio Boys Super (October - December, 2011), with Hirofumi Araki
- Koi no Daisōsasen (November 23, 2012) - "Gekiraji! Live" (NHK Radio 1)
- JFN Saturday Drama House "Bidanshi Gekijyou" (December, 2016) - "Tsurugi no Chikai"

== Official DVDs ==
Year	DVD	Release date
2007	Prince Series D-Boys Collection - Hiroki Suzuki	May 16, 2007
2009	D-Boys Boy Friend Series Vol.3 Peace Maker	September 18, 2009
2010	D-Boys Boy Friend Series Vol.7 7 Heroes	February 24, 2010

== Official photobooks ==
- Prince Series D-Boys Collection - Hiroki Suzuki (April 19, 2007)
- Kimi ga Warattekurerunara... (May 29, 2008)
- 360° (August 25, 2009)

== Events ==
- Araki Hirofumi - History EP2 - ZukiAra ~ Otona no 32129 Halloween ~ (October 19, 2019)

== Television commercials ==
- Bandai Charadeco Christmas (2007)
- Gerolsteiner mineral water (2008)
- Sukiya Kinpira Konnyaku Gyudon (2012)
