= Yuya Endo =

Japanese actor and singer

- 遠藤 雄弥
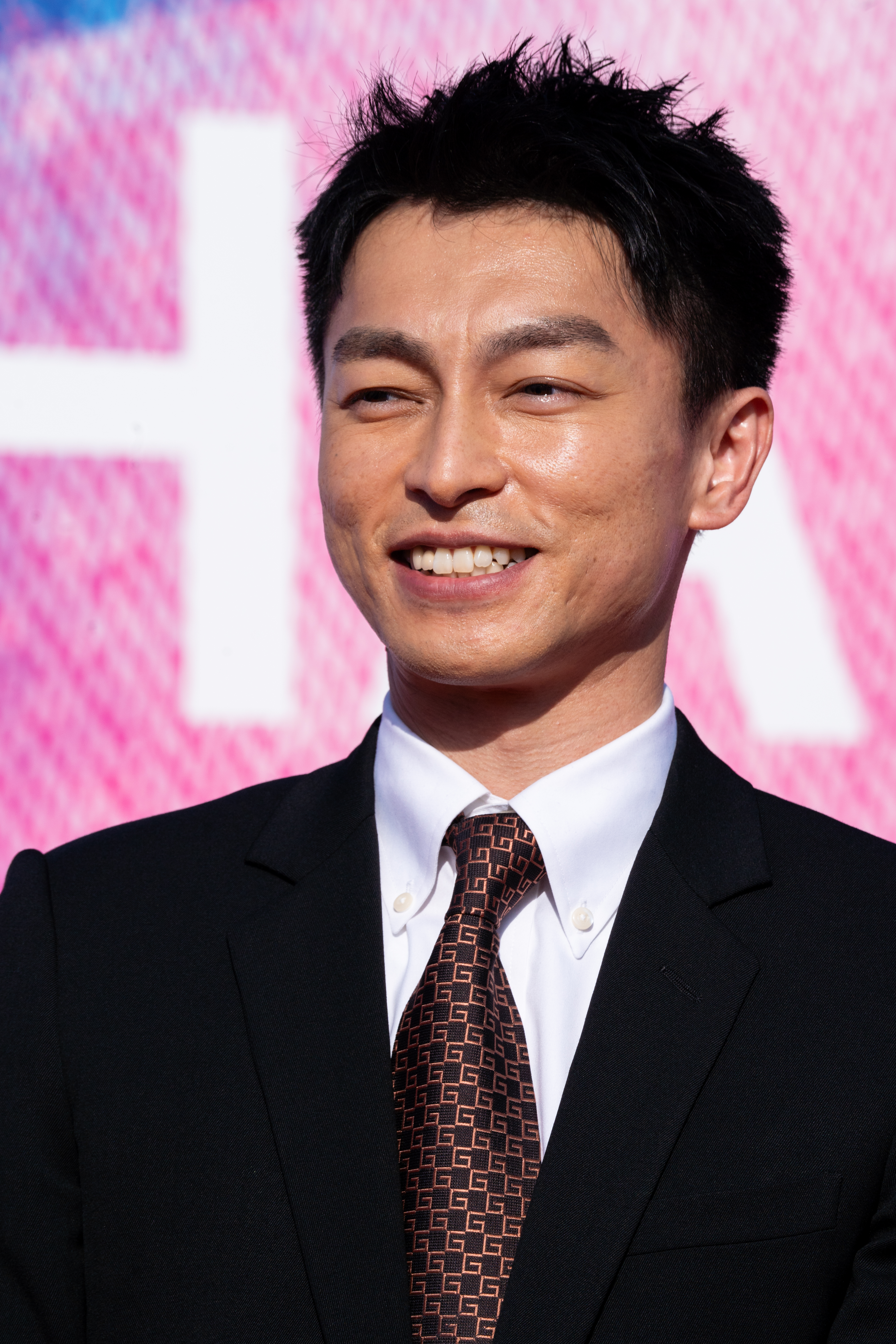
- Endo at the Yokohama International Film Festival 2024
- Born: March 20, 1987 (age 39)
- Occupation: Actor
- Years active: 1998–present
- Website: https://meteora-pro.com/artists/%e9%81%a0%e8%97%a4-%e9%9b%84%e5%bc%a5-2/

Yuya Endo (遠藤 雄弥, Endō Yūya; born March 20, 1987) is a Japanese actor and singer under Meteora. He is best known for his role as Ryoma Echizen in The Prince of Tennis musical series (commonly known as Tenimyu). He was also part of a young men's stage acting troupe, D-BOYS, which perform in various skit-like performances.

== Early life ==
Endo was born in Atsugi, Kanagawa. His mother encouraged him to enter the entertainment career by joining a children's theater troupe, as he was perceived as an introvert, hoping that that immersion with children of his own age would make him open up. He didn't go voluntarily, until he was in upper Elementary, when he was moved by Issei Ishida's performance in the drama March of the Saints. He then started to actively seek auditions.

== Career ==
=== Acting career ===
Endo's major onscreen debut was for the 2000 film, Juvenile. He also was a part of the Watanabe net drama, Hice Cool (2005), appearing alongside fellow D-Boy members, Kotaro Yanagi, Yuu Shirota, and Osamu Adachi.

Endo also appeared, as a member of The Tigers in the TV drama, The Hit Parade, which aired May 26, 2006, on Fuji TV and co-starred fellow D-BOYS members Masato Wada, Shirota, Masaki Kaji, Hirofumi Araki, Hiroki Suzuki and Kōji Seto.

The D-boys have also starred in their own documentary variety series called, DD-Boys with fellow D-BOYS member, Kotaro Yanagi also playing himself, as they try to live in the D-house while the other D-Boys drop by. The show was 23 episodes long and ran from April 10 to September 25, 2006.

=== Music career ===
On November 16, 2005, Endo released an Idol DVD called Ao no Kiseki.

In September 2006, he, along with Shirota, appeared in the music video for Rag Fair's "Kimi no Tame ni Boku ga Tate ni Naro", playing a DJ in love with his co-host.

In June 2007, the D-BOYS starred in their very own musical together called, D-BOYS STAGE, which ran from June 3 to June 10 at the Space Zero theater in Tokyo.

Endo was brought into Tenimyu in 2004 as a replacement for fellow D-BOY member Kotaro Yanagi, who had been injured in a car accident, as the main protagonist Ryoma Echizen. Endo made his debut as Echizen during the Dream Live 1st concert and would play the role while Yanagi was recovering. He also shared the role with Yanagi after his recovery as the so-called "Double Echizen", in two shows: Side Fudomine ~Special Match~ and Dream Live 2nd; Endo did all of the dance and tennis match choreography while Yanagi did stand still scenes due to his injuries. During his run in the musicals, Endo was able to work with other D-BOYS members: Kaji, Suzuki, Adachi, Araki, Wada, and former member Shirota. On May 4, 2005, after the final performance for the Dream Live 2nd concert, Endo graduated from his role. Yanagi would carry on as Echizen with the second generation Seigaku cast.

== Photobooks ==
The D-BOYS released two Photobooks. The first photobook released on April 27, 2005, was self-titled D-Boys, while the second, released on March 15, 2006, was called Start, both which contain many photos of Endo.

== Personal life ==
Endo announced on August 17, 2015, on his blog, his marriage in 2014 to a woman who he met through an acquaintance. They have a daughter born in July 2015.

== SNS ==
Endo kept a blog with occasional updates on his D-Boys webpage.

Endo opened in 2021 a YouTube channel where he shares anything from videos with his cat, to travelogues, to unboxings.

== Filmography ==
=== Television ===
Year	Title	Role	Other notes	Ref.
2000	Friday Night Drama Yasha	Young Sei, Young Rin (twin boys)		
2000	Minimoni de Bremen no Ongaku-tai	Kenji		
2004	Medaka	Nemoto Yuya		
2005	Rocket Boys	Kajishin	Lead role	
2005	Hice Cool! ~Okinawa Boys! 2005 ja	Nobu	Web Drama	
2005	1 Litre no Namida	Takeda Makoto		
2005	min.Jam: Gakkou no Kaidan		Web Drama (episode "Bunkasai-hen")	
2006	Nodame Cantabile	Okochi Mamoru		
2006	The Hit Parade	Kenji Sawada of The Tigers		
2007	First Kiss	Hideki	Episode 2	
2008	Atsuhime	Arimura Jizaemon	Taiga drama	
2008	Nodame Cantabile in Europe (live-action special)	Ookuchi Mamoru	TV movie	
2008	Isshun no Kaze ni Nare		Mini drama	
2008	Hokaben	Totsuka Genichi	Episode 7	
2008	Dageki Tenshi Ruri	Soma Kenichiro		
2009	Voice: Inochi naki mono no koe	Kirihata Teppei		
2009	Shiroi Haru	Kojima Yuki		
2012	Man of Destiny	Kaneda		
2025	Last Samurai Standing	Gion Sansuke		
2026	Brothers in Arms	Sakuma Morimasa	Taiga drama	

=== Film ===
Year	Title	Role	Other notes	Ref.
2000	Juvenile	Yusuke Sakamoto		
2004	L'amant (Japanese film)	Kojin Karatani		
2006	Drift	Koji Hokuto		
2014	Hot Road	Nagayama		
2019	Soredemo, boku wa yume o miru[ja]	Makoto Mikami		
2021	Onoda: 10,000 Nights in the Jungle	Young Hiroo Onoda	Lead role	
2022	Yokaipedia	Itsuki's father		
2022	No Hō e, Nagareru	Tomonori	Lead role	
2023	Godzilla Minus One	Saitō		
2024	Tatsumi	Tatsumi	Lead role	
2024	Sakura	Hiroki Asaba		
2024	The Gesuidouz	Hayato Takamura		
2024	Faceless	Yuta Miyamura		
2025	Muromachi Outsiders	Akama Seishiro		
2025	The Hungry God	Wada	Lead role	
2025	Welcome Back	Takuto Aoyama		
2025	Tiger	Koji	Lead role	
2026	Busshi	Naoya	Lead role	
2026	Road To Vendetta	Yuto	Hong Kong-Japanese film	

== Official DVDs ==
Year	DVD	Release date
2005	Ao no Kiseki (Blue Miracle)	November 16, 2005

== Stage ==
- March 21 to April 1, 2007, in the Out of Order Live Entertainment Show

D-BOYS

- June 3 to June 10, 2007, as a regular performer in the D-BOYS STAGE Musical

=== Musicals ===
TENIMYU: THE PRINCE OF TENNIS MUSICAL SERIES (as Ryoma Echizen)

- The Prince of Tennis Musical: Dream Live 1st (2004)
- The Prince of Tennis Musical: More Than Limit St. Rudolph Gakuen (2004)
- The Prince of Tennis Musical: Side Fudomine ~Special Match~ (shared the role with a returning Kotaro Yanagi) (In Winter of 2004-2005)
- The Prince of Tennis Musical: Side Yamabuki feat. St. Rudolph (In Winter of 2004-2005)
- The Prince of Tennis Musical: Dream Live 2nd (he again shared the role with Yanagi) (2005)

== See also ==
- D-Boys
- Tenimyu
- Juvenile
- The Prince of Tennis
- Ryoma Echizen
