= Osamu Adachi =

Japanese actor (born 1987)

- Born: December 22, 1987 (age 38); Tokyo, Japan
- Years active: 2004—present
- Website: Official site

Osamu Adachi (足立 理, Adachi Osamu; born December 22, 1987) is a Japanese actor and a former member of the acting group D-BOYS. He is best known for his role as Eiji Kikumaru in The Prince of Tennis musical series, Tenimyu, and in the live film adaptation.

== Career ==
In October 2004, Adachi joined the Watanabe Entertainment group named the D-BOYS. He took part in TV shows and has appeared in Glay's "White Road" (2005) music video. He was also a part of the Watanabe net drama "Hice Cool" (2005) and "DD-BOYS", appearing alongside fellow D-Boys members. But, by the end of January 2007, it was announced to fan club members that while Adachi was still being represented by Watanabe Pro, both he and Yuma Minakawa had officially withdrawn from the group. In April 2008, however, it was announced that Adachi would be re-joining the D-BOYS and participating in the second D-Stage.

=== As Eiji Kikumaru in The Prince of Tennis Musicals ===
In 2004, Adachi won the role of Eiji Kikumaru, the acrobatic player of Seigaku Middle School's tennis club, in the Prince of Tennis musicals, Tenimyu. From 2005 to 2006, he became the third actor to play Kikumaru as a member of the second generation Seigaku cast. He made his debut as Kikumaru on January 8, 2005 in the Side Yamabuki performance in Osaka. That same year, his role as Kikumaru was carried into the live adaptation film of the manga. During his run in the musicals, he was able to work with fellow D-BOYS members Yuya Endo, Kotaro Yanagi, Masaki Kaji, Hiroki Suzuki, Hirofumi Araki, Masato Wada, and former member Yuu Shirota.

On March 29, 2006, in the Dream Live 3rd live concert, Adachi, along with the majority of the Seigaku cast, graduated from their roles. Since his graduation, the role of Kikumaru has been played by D-BOYS member Kōji Seto, Kyousuke Hamao, Shouta Takazaki, Yuta Koseki and currently by Kuroba Mario.

=== As Eiji Kikumaru in The Prince of Tennis live-action film ===
Adachi was able to carry on his role from the musicals to the live-adaptation film of the manga series of The Prince of Tennis. He, along with most of the principal cast members for the Seigaku Regulars, were able to reprise their roles in the movie. The only major casting change was the casting of Kanata Hongo as Ryoma Echizen, the main protagonist.

The Prince of Tennis was released on May 13, 2006 and opened on the tenth spot in the Japanese Box Office and marked Adachi's first appearance in the film industry.

== Filmography ==
Year	Title	Role	Other notes
2005	Hice Cool	Takashi	(Web Drama)
2005	Boku to kanojo no xxx (Me and Her xxx)		(Web Drama/Episode 1)
2006	The Prince of Tennis	Eiji Kikumaru	
2006	Shinrei Shashin Kitan	Junichi Yamamoto	(in Story #2 "Miteiru")
2006	DD-BOYS (TV documentary)	Himself	(Episode 5, 9, 11, 22, 23)
2006	Princess Princess D (Drama)	Akira Sakamoto	
2006	My Boss My Hero (Drama)	Shinichi Maki	
2008	Bra bra Ban ban (movie)		
2010	Higanjima (movie)	Nishiyama	
2010	General Rouge no Gaisen (Drama)	Yasutomo Nagayama	
2010	Sayonara, Aruma	Lance Corporal Kawamura	a TV movie special
2011	Shibatora		Appears in Special 2
2012	DxTOWN (Drama)	Nada	in Story #1 "Spiders Now"
2012	Iryu Sousa 2	Mitsuo Kamata	Episode 2
2018	Kamen Rider Build	Fu Washio/Remocon Bro's/Hell Bro's	

== Stage work ==
TENIMYU: THE PRINCE OF TENNIS MUSICAL SERIES (as Eiji Kikumaru)

- The Prince of Tennis Musical: Side Yamabuki feat. St. Rudolph (In Winter of 2004-2005)
- The Prince of Tennis Musical: Dream Live 2nd (2005)
- The Prince of Tennis Musical: The Imperial Match Hyotei Gakuen (2005)
- The Prince of Tennis Musical: The Imperial Match Hyotei Gakuen in Winter (In Winter of 2005-2006)
- The Prince of Tennis Musical: Dream Live 3rd (2006)

D-BOYS

- D-BOYS STAGE: The Last Game (June 2008)
- D-BOYS STAGE vol 3: Karasu 04 (April 2009) as Ryu
- D-BOYS STAGE vol 4: The Last Game (August 2010)
- D-BOYS STAGE 2011: The Merchant of Venice (April 2011) as Nerissa

== Discography ==
- 2005 - Tenimyu - in Winter: Side Yamabuki - Featuring St Rudolph OST
- 2005 - Tenimyu - Dream Live 2nd OST
- 2005 - Tenimyu - The Imperial Match Hyotei OST
- 2006 - Tenimyu - Hyoutei in Winter OST
- 2006 - Tenimyu - Dream Live 3rd OST

== Official DVDs ==
- 2005 - Tenimyu - in Winter: Side Yamabuki - Featuring St Rudolph
- 2005 - Tenimyu - Dream Live 2nd
- 2005 - Tenimyu - The Imperial Match Hyotei
- 2006 - Princess Princess D
- 2006 - My Boss My Hero
- 2006 - Tenimyu - Hyoutei in Winter
- 2006 - Tenimyu - Dream Live 3rd
- 2007 - DD-BOYS Vol. 1 - 6 (+ special DVD)
- 2009 - D- Boys Stage vol. 3 ~ Karasu ~04

== Photobooks & Calendar ==
- 2005 D-BOYS - Start!
- 2005 D-BOYS Desktop Calendar ´06
- 2006 D-BOYS Desktop Calendar ´07
