= D-Date =

Japanese boy band

- Origin: Tokyo, Japan
- Genres: J-pop
- Years active: 2010–2013
- Labels: Universal Music Japan; Avex Entertainment
- Spinoff of: D-Boys
- Members: Kōji Seto; Hirofumi Araki; Arata Horii
- Past members: Yuichi Nakamura; Shunji Igarashi; Tomo Yanagishita
- Website: www.d-date.jp/index.php

D-Date (stylized as D☆DATE) was a Japanese boy band and sub-group of D-Boys, a male performance troupe associated with Watanabe Entertainment. The group was created to celebrate Watanabe Entertainment's 10th anniversary. The members consist of Kōji Seto, Hirofumi Araki, and Arata Horii. Previous members of D-Date include Yuichi Nakamura, Shunji Igarashi, and Tomo Yanagishita.

D-Date made their debut on December 1, 2010 through Universal Music Japan, with their first single "Ato 1 cm no Mirai." Following Igarashi's retirement from D-Date in 2013, the group has become inactive, as all the members have returned to focus on their individual acting careers.

== Career ==
=== Predebut ===
On March 20, 2010, Watanabe Entertainment announced at their 10th anniversary event that they were putting together a 5-member boy group based on their male performance troupe, D-Boys, then known as the 2010 D-Boys Project. The fifth member would be chosen through a series of auditions beginning on April 4 in 10 cities across Japan. On April 16, 2010, Watanabe Entertainment announced that four members of the group would be D-Boys members Kōji Seto, Hirofumi Araki, Yuichi Nakamura, and Shunji Igarashi. On July 4, 2010, a late-night variety show, D-Boys Be Ambitious, was broadcast on TV Tokyo and starred Seto, Araki, Igarashi, and Nakamura. D-Boys Be Ambitious would also document the group's formation and provide information on voting for the group's name and fifth member. Approximately 30,000 people applied for the audition, and by August 2010, seven finalists were chosen. Video clips of them were broadcast through D-Boys Be Ambitious for the viewers to vote on D-Boys' website. Nakamura soon went on hiatus in August 2010 due to health problems and, as a result, he was absent from D-Date's activities, including their CD debut.

On September 5, 2010, the name of the group was revealed to be "D-Date" on D-Boys Be Ambitious. On September 19, 2010, during a live judging event hosted by Seto, Igarashi, and Araki, and attended by 500 fans, Arata Horii was announced as D-Date's fifth member. D-Date were to make their CD debut through Universal Music Japan.

=== 2010–2012: Debut ===
D-Date later made their CD debut on December 1, 2010, with their first single "Ato 1 cm no Mirai." Seto explained that the title of the song came from the idea that "starting is the hardest part" of achieving a goal. The B-side of the single, "Omoi (D-Date version)" was later included on the compilation album Ai no Uta, a charity album by Universal Music Japan's recording artists for relief for the 2011 Tōhoku earthquake and tsunami.

On April 6, 2011, D-Date released their second single, "Change My Life." The song was produced by Hiroki from Dragon Ash and Cell no9. "Change My Life" was featured in a commercial for Nescafé Excella and as the opening theme song to the television program Happy Music. It was released with the B-side "Dear Friends (Boku-tachi no Yūki)".

On July 27, 2011, D-Date released their third single, "Day By Day." The song was described as a "summer song" that focused on "friends" and "music" as the themes. Much like "Change My Life", it was also released as a tie-in for a commercial for Nestle Excella and as the opening theme song to Happy Music. It was released with the B-side "All For One." The music video for the song takes place at a resort. It includes a guest star appearance from former professional boxer Yoko Gushiken as a disgruntled customer and featured 200 extras. On July 30, 2011, D-Date embarked on their first tour, "Summer Date Live: Te o Tsunaide." In August 2011, Watanabe Entertainment announced that Nakamura would be leaving D-Date.

During a fan event in December 2011, D-Date announced that they were releasing two singles, "Love Heaven" and "Joker", in two consecutive months. To prepare for the release of "Love Heaven", D-Date revealed at the event that they went on a training camp after their first tour for dance and vocal training. In addition, "Love Heaven" was released as the group's first love song, with lyrics written by Araki. "Love Heaven" was released on January 21, 2012 and served as a tie-in song to a LeTao commercial. It was released with the B-side "Ordinary."

"Joker" was released on February 22, 2012. Seto described the song as a "slightly more mature love song" compared to "Love Heaven." The song was produced by Jin and featured a theme of betrayal. "Joker" also served as the ending theme song to the television program Onegai! Ranking. It was released with the B-sides "See You Later... Good Night", a solo song by Araki, on the limited edition A version and "Your Magic" on the limited edition B and normal versions. "Joker" was promoted with a 30-minute short film based on the song that was directed by Takashi Kubota, starring the members of D-Date and featuring a guest appearance by actress Aya Ōmasa. Igarashi, who had co-starred with Ōmasa in the 2011 film Paradise Kiss, had offered her to make an appearance in the short film. The short film was released as a DVD accompanied with the limited edition B version. It was also serialized as five short episodes as late-night bumpers under the title Who is Joker? on TV Tokyo between February 13 to February 21, 2012. For a limited time, a campaign was held on their website for the viewers to determine the identity of the traitor from the short film.

=== 2012–2013: 1st Date, member line-up changes ===
On April 25, 2012, D-Date released their first album, 1st Date, which compiled all the songs they had released. A new song from the album, "Catch a Train!", was used as the opening theme song to D × Town, a television drama series starring six members from D-Boys. To promote the album, D-Date embarked on their second tour in four locations across Japan in June. On June 29, 2012, during the final date of their second tour, D-Date announced that D-Boys member Tomo Yanagishita would be added to the group as their newest member. In October 2012, D-Date changed labels to Avex Entertainment.

On June 10, 2013, D-Date released their sixth single, "Glory Days", which served as the opening theme song to the second season of the anime series Kingdom. The song is described as an "up-tempo" song. From October 13 to November 17, 2013, D-Date went on their third live tour in five cities across Japan. On November 4, 2013, during one of their final stops, Igarashi announced that he was leaving the group and retiring from the entertainment industry to inherit his father's company. Following this, D-Date became inactive as a group; in January 2015, Araki stated that the members of D-Date have returned to focus on their individual acting careers, and, because of that, it was difficult for them to hold activities as a group. On September 30, 2020, Yanagishita announced he was leaving the agency and retiring from the entertainment industry after his marriage.

== Members ==
- Hirofumi Araki - leader
- Kōji Seto
- Arata Horii

=== Former ===
- Yuichi Nakamura (2010–2011)
- Shunji Igarashi (2010–2013)
- Tomo Yanagishita (2012–2020)

== Discography ==
=== Studio albums ===
List of studio albums, with selected chart positions, sales figures and certifications
Title	Album details	Peak chart positions		Sales
Title	Album details	JPN Oricon	JPN Albums	Sales
1st Date	Released: April 25, 2012; Label: Universal Music; Formats: CD	11	11	JPN: 61,437

=== Singles ===
Title	Year	Peak chart positions		Sales	Album
Title	Year	JPN	JPN Hot	Sales	Album
"Ato 1 cm no Mirai" (あと1cmのミライ)	2010	7	34	—N/a	1st Date
"Change My Life"	2011	7	19	—N/a	1st Date
"Day By Day"	2011	7	78	—N/a	1st Date
"Love Heaven"	2012	6	11	—N/a	1st Date
"Joker"	2012	7	22	—N/a	1st Date
"Glory Days"	2013	7	9	—N/a	Non-album single
"—" denotes releases that did not chart or were not released in that region.

=== Concert DVDs ===
Title	Year	Details	Peak chart positions	Sales
Title	Year	Details	JPN	Sales
D-Date 1st Tour 2011 Summer Date Live: Te wo Tsunaide (D☆DATE 1st Tour 2011 Summer DATE LIVE～手をつないで～)	2011	Released: December 21, 2011; Label: Milestone Crowds; Format: DVD	—	—
D-Date Tour 2012: Date a Live	2013	Released: January 30, 2013; Label: Avex Entertainment; Format: DVD	16	—
D-Date Tour 2013: Glory Five Final	2014	Released: September 10, 2014; Label: Avex Trax; Format: DVD	14	—
"—" denotes releases that did not chart or were not released in that region.
