= Masato Wada =

Japanese actor and singer

Masato Wada (和田正人)
- Born: August 25, 1979 (age 46); Kōchi Prefecture, Japan
- Occupations: Actor, singer
- Years active: 2004–present
- Spouse: Risa Yoshiki (m. 2017)
- Children: 2
- Website: Wada's Official Blog

Masato Wada (和田 正人, Wada Masato) is a Japanese actor and singer. He is known for his role as Sengoku Kiyosumi in The Prince of Tennis musical series, Tenimyu (and making a cameo in the Prince of Tennis live action film adaptation). He is also part of a young men's stage acting troupe, D-BOYS, which perform in various skit-like performances. He starred as Nobuo Akagi/Akiba Red in the 2012 Super Sentai parody series Unofficial Sentai Akibaranger.

== Career ==
He has appeared in a various number of TV shows.

Wada portrayed the real-life Keijiro Yamashita, in the TV drama special, The Hit Parade, starring fellow D-BOYS members Yu Shirota, Masaki Kaji, Hiroki Suzuki, Hirofumi Araki, Yuya Endo and Kōji Seto. The show aired May 26, 2006 on Fuji TV.

On January 1, 2007, Wada appeared on the 44th annual broadcast of the Secret New Years' Performance Tournament's "Chinese Lion Dance" segment, with fellow D-BOYS members Yuya Endo, Masaki Kaji, Hiroki Suzuki and former D-Boys member, Yuma Minakawa.

=== With the D-BOYS ===
In October 2004, Wada joined the Watanabe Entertainment group named the D-BOYS. He is currently, the oldest member in the group. As a member of the D-BOYS, Wada also keeps a blog, which he updates regularly. Being a part of the D-BOYS provides Wada with a lot of opportunities. Among them is to perform with the group of boys and expand his experience as a performer. The D-BOYS so far have released two photobooks. The first photobook released on April 27, 2005, was self-titled D-Boys, while the second, released on March 15, 2006, was called Start, both which contain many photos of Wada.

The D-BOYS starred in their own drama documentary variety series called, DD-Boys in which Wada's appeared in many episodes as himself. The show was 24 episodes long and ran from April 10 to September 25, 2006. In June 2007, the D-BOYS starred in their very own musical together called, D-BOYS STAGE, which ran from June 3 to 10 at the Space Zero theater in Tokyo. Wada only appeared in the musical as a guest performer, making select appearances on June 4 and 7.

=== As Sengoku Kiyosumi in The Prince of Tennis Musicals ===
In 2005, Wada won the role of Sengoku Kiyosumi, the "lucky" 3rd year regular of Yamabuki Middle School's tennis club in the Prince of Tennis musical series, Tenimyu. From 2005 to 2007, he was the first and only actor to play Sengoku. He made his debut on January 8, 2005 in the Side Yamabuki performance in Osaka. The musical marked his first major debut on stage. During his run in the musicals, he was able to work with fellow D-BOYS members Yuya Endo, Kotaro Yanagi, Masaki Kaji, Hiroki Suzuki, Hirofumi Araki, Osamu Adachi, Tomo Yanagishita, Kōji Seto, and former member Yuu Shirota. His last musical appearance as Sengoku was in the fourth Dream Live concert in 2007.

=== As Kintarou Tooyama in the Prince of Tennis Live-Action Film ===
Wada was not able to carry on his role from the musicals to the live-adaptation film of the manga series, because the character of Sengoku, as well as the entire Yamabuki team, does not appear in the film; however, he was able to make a small cameo in the film as Kintarou Tooyama, a member of Seigaku's rival team, Shintenhouji. The cameo appearance marked Wada's first film debut.

The Prince of Tennis was released on May 13, 2006 and opened in the tenth spot in the Japanese Box Office.

=== As Toshiya Nogami in Fushin no toki -Woman Wars- ===
Then, Wada appeared in the TV drama, Fushin no toki -Woman Wars (だめんず・うぉ~か~) as a minor character, named Toshiya Nogami, which premiered on Fuji TV July 6, 2006 and broadcast until September 21, 2006.

=== As Ichitarou Fukuyama in Damens Walker ===
Afterwards, Wada appeared in the TV drama, Damens Walkers (だめんず・うぉ~か~) as a businessman, named Ichitarou Fukuyama, which premiered on TV Asahi October 12, 2006 and broadcast until December 7, 2006. The drama was based on a popular comic book by Mayumi Kurata, about beautiful women that end up having relationships with worthless men that cheat and lie.

=== As Atsushi Baba in Konshuu, Tsuma ga Uwaki Shimasu ===
Wada appeared as a businessman, named Atsushi Baba, in the TV drama, Konshuu, Tsuma ga Uwaki Shimasu (今週､妻が浮気します), which premiered on Fuji TV, January 16, 2007.

=== In the Hit Parade Musical ===
In 2006, Wada had appeared in the TV drama special, The Hit Parade, starring as Keijiro Yamashita.

Then, in 2007, it was announced that Wada would also be starring in the Watanabe special musical, The Hit Parade, the musical version of the TV drama special, Hit Parade that Wada had starred in. Performances will run from July 10–31, 2007 at the Aoyama Theater in Tokyo and will also run from March 31, 2007 to April 1, 2007 at the Le Theatre Ginza in Tokyo.

=== As Shinjuro Mamiya in Shigeshoshi ===
Shigeshoshi (a.k.a. The Embalmer) became Wada's first opportunity to take the lead role in a television serial. Based on the manga of the same name by Mitsukazu Mihara, the series centered around embalmer Shinjuro Mamiya, and the understanding of the nature of life and death that he gains through his work. Shigeshoshi aired on TV Tokyo from October to December 2007, and also featured fellow D-Boys, Shunji Igarashi and Masaki Kaji.

== Personal life ==
Wada keeps a blog on his D-BOYS webpage, which he updates regularly. In his blog entries he often writes about his personal thoughts and feelings on various subjects in his life. Despite the fact that he has stated in his blog that he does not often connect his work relationships with private relationships, he is very close friends with fellow D-BOYS members, Masaki Kaji (often regarding Kaji as a best friend and younger brother) and Hiroki Suzuki.

== Filmography ==
=== Films ===
Year	Title	Role	Other notes	Ref.
2017	Sekigahara	Kuroda Nagamasa		
2022	Dreaming of the Meridian Arc			
2022	Kaigan-dōri no Neko-mimi Tantei	Kōsuke Saruwatari	Lead role	
2023	The Legend and Butterfly	Maeda Inuchiyo		
2023	A Life with My Alzheimer's Husband	Kōichi	Lead role	
2023	Winny			
2024	Sisam	Zensuke		
2024	Symphony of Smoldering Chaos	Kōhei Ōnami	Lead role	
2025	Under the Big Onion	Mochizuki		
2026	Kyojo: Reunion			
2026	Kyojo: Requiem			

=== Television ===
Year	Title	Role	Other notes	Ref.
2016	Specialist	Nozomu Nogata		
2017	Naotora: The Lady Warlord	Matsushita Jōkei	Taiga drama	
2019	Idaten	Teru Yamamoto	Taiga drama	
2022	Bakumatsu Aibō-den	Nakaoka Shintarō	TV movie	
2024	Laughing Matryoshka	Hatade Kentaro		
2024	The Tiger and Her Wings	Tokio Endō	Asadora	
2026	Water Margin	Cao Zheng		
2026	Brothers in Arms	Imai Sōkyū	Taiga drama	
2026	Shadows of the Ten Ninja	Ōno Harunaga		

== Stage ==
- March 21, March 23, and March 26, 2007 as a guest performer in the Out of Order Live Entertainment Show

=== Musicals ===
TENIMYU: THE PRINCE OF TENNIS MUSICAL SERIES (as Sengoku Kiyosumi)

- The Prince of Tennis Musical: Side Yamabuki feat. St. Rudolph (In Winter of 2004–2005)
- The Prince of Tennis Musical: Dream Live 2nd (2005)
- The Prince of Tennis Musical: The Imperial Match Hyotei Gakuen (2005)
- The Prince of Tennis Musical: The Imperial Match Hyotei Gakuen in Winter (In Winter of 2005–2006)
- The Prince of Tennis Musical: Dream Live 4th ~Extra~ (2007)

=== Plays ===
- April 2005 in Putting a Ribbon on the Little Box of Dreams
- June 4 and 7, 2007 as a guest performer in the D-BOYS STAGE Musical
- July 10 to 31, 2007 in the Watanabe special Musical The Hit Parade
- June 2008 as a performer in "D-BOYS STAGE vol 2: The Last Game"
- October 2009 as a performer in "D-BOYS STAGE vol 3: Karasu 10"
- April 2010 as performer in "D-BOYS STAGE vol 4: Now Loading"
- April 29 to May 15, 2011, played as Antonio in "D-BOYS STAGE: The Merchant of Venice"

== See also ==
- D-Boys
- Tenimyu
- The Prince of Tennis Movie
- The Prince of Tennis
- Yamabuki
