= Hirofumi Araki =

Japanese actor and singer (born 1983)

- 荒木 宏文
- Born: June 14, 1983 (age 43); Hyōgo Prefecture, Japan
- Occupations: Actor; talent; singer
- Years active: 2004–present
- Height: 174 cm (5 ft 9 in)
- Musical career
- Formerly of: D-Boys; D-Date; Avex
- Website: Official profile

Japanese name
- Kanji: 荒木 宏文
- Hiragana: あらき ひろふみ
- Katakana: アラキ ヒロフミ
Transcriptions
- Romanization: Araki Hirofumi

Hirofumi Araki (荒木 宏文, Araki Hirofumi; born June 14, 1983) is a Japanese actor and singer associated with Watanabe Entertainment. He is a member of the acting troupe D-Boys and the leader of its pop unit D-Date. As an actor, Araki has been involved in many theater and television projects, notably starring in Musical: The Prince of Tennis, Juken Sentai Gekiranger, and Musical: Touken Ranbu. In 2015, Araki made his solo debut with his single Next Stage. On June 14, 2023, Araki changed his name to 新木 宏典, but it is still read the same way.

== Career ==
In October 2004, Araki joined the Watanabe Entertainment group named the D-Boys. On April 27, 2005, they have released a photobook entitled D-Boys, while the second, released on March 15, 2006, was called Start. Araki has appeared in various TV shows, debuting in the TV drama The Hit Parade as a member of The Tigers. The show, which aired on May 26, 2006 on Fuji TV, also starred his fellow D-Boys members Masato Wada, Yuu Shirota, Masaki Kaji, Hiroki Suzuki, Yuuya Endo and Kōji Seto. Araki also appeared on a Japanese radio program for BAY FM with fellow D-Boys member Kōji Seto on October 14, 2006.

Araki's acting career took off when he portrayed Sadaharu Inui, the "data-tennis" regular of Seigaku Middle School's tennis club in the Prince of Tennis musicals, Tenimyu. He became the second actor to play Inui as part of the second-generation Seigaku cast. He made his debut on January 8, 2005 in the Side Yamabuki performance in Osaka. During his run in the musicals, he worked with fellow D-Boys members Yuya Endo, Kotaro Yanagi, Masaki Kaji, Hiroki Suzuki, Osamu Adachi, Masato Wada, and former member Yu Shirota. Araki reprised his role in the live-adaptation film of the Prince of Tennis manga series. He, along with most of the principal cast members for the Seigaku Regulars, reprised their roles in the movie, while Kanata Hongō was cast as Ryoma Echizen, the main protagonist. On March 29, 2006, at the end of the final Dream Live 3rd show, Araki and majority of the Seigaku cast graduated from their roles. After his graduation, he was succeeded by Masei Nakayama in portraying Inui.

The D-Boys starred in their own drama documentary variety series called, DD-Boys in which Araki has appeared in a few episodes as himself. The show has 24 episodes and ran from April 10 to September 25, 2006. Araki appeared in the film June Bride based on the manga of the same name by Yoshida Satoshi. He played one of the supporting characters and co-starred with fellow D-Boys members Shirota and Suzuki.

In June 2006, Araki acted onstage in the play Limit: What Is Your Story?, where he appeared with fellow D-Boys members Suzuki and Yuichi Nakamura. On February 18, 2007, Araki starred in the Super Sentai series Juken Sentai Gekiranger as the main villain Rio, a former student of the Gekijuken Beast Arts whose motivation of becoming strong resulted in him turning his back on his teacher as he becomes leader of the revived Rinjuken Akugata. The show also co-stars Hirofumi's fellow D-Boys member Suzuki as Rio's rival and the series protagonist, Jan Kandō/GekiRed.

It was announced in early 2007 that Araki, along with D-Boys members Suzuki and Kōji Seto would be getting solo photobooks and DVDs called the "Prince Series". Araki's solo photobook was released on April 19, 2007, while his solo idol DVD was released on May 16, 2007. A "Prince Series" trading card set featuring all three boys shortly followed the release of the books and DVDs. In June 2007, the D-Boys starred in their very own musical together called, D-Boys Stage, which ran from June 3 to 10 at the Space Zero theater in Tokyo. Araki appeared in the musical as a guest performer, making select appearances on June 6 and 9.

Araki's second photobook, entitled "Always By Your Side" was released in May 2008. It was brought out simultaneously with Suzuki's second photobook despite being separate from the "Prince Series", most likely to highlight on the boys' success in Juken Sentai Gekiranger. A limited-edition trading card set featuring both Araki and Suzuki was released on September 27, 2008 to coincide with their recent books.

== Personal life ==
Araki keeps a blog on his D-Boys webpage, which he updates frequently. He is very close friends with fellow D-Boys members Hiroki Suzuki, Kōji Seto, Masaki Kaji, Masato Wada, and Osamu Adachi.

== Filmography ==
=== Film ===
Year	Title	Role	Notes	Ref.
2004	Kwaidan: Eternal Love	Townsman		
2006	The Prince of Tennis	Sadaharu Inui		
2006	June Bride	Yoshitake		
2007	Juken Sentai Gekiranger: Nei-Nei! Hou-Hou! Hong Kong Decisive Battle	Rio / Black Lion Rio		
2008	Juken Sentai Gekiranger vs Boukenger	Rio / Black Lion Rio		
2008	Asymmetry	Shin'ichirō Tatsumi	Lead role	
2008	Shakariki!	Bandman		
2008	1 Month Like Summer Vacation	Junya Kashiwagi	Lead role	
2008	Ōoku Ukie Hiren	Ukishima	Lead role; part of Taiga Roman Trilogy	
2009	20th Century Boys 2: The Last Hope	Britney		
2009	BeatRock☆Love	Aki	Lead role	
2009	Engine Sentai Go-onger vs. Gekiranger	Rio / Black Lion Rio		
2009	Battle of Demons	Kaki Kitō	Lead role	
2009	Battle of Demons 2	Kaki Kitō	Video appearance	
2009	Battle of Demons 3	Kaki Kitō		
2010	X Game	Hideaki Kokubo	Lead role	
2017	Stray Dogz 5	Rei Gojo		
2018	Uchu Sentai Kyuranger vs. Space Squad	Rio / Black Lion Rio	Voice only; video appearance	
2022	Bungo Stray Dogs The Movie: Beast	Ango Sakaguchi		
2022	Jet Black Ten: The Ending Story	Nameless	Lead role	

=== Television ===
Year	Title	Role	Broadcast	Notes	Ref.
2006	The Hit Parade	The Tigers	Fuji TV		
2006	Regatta	Imai	TV Asahi	Episode 3	
2007	Juken Sentai Gekiranger	Rio / Black Lion Rio	TV Asahi / Toei		
2008	The Negotiator	Takashi Sakai	TV Asahi	Episodes 7–8	
2008	Eisei Damashī 2: Ikenai Tashizan A+B	Makoto	BS Japan	Episode 4	
2008	Love 17	Makoto Takeshita	Mētele		
2009	Deadly Work People 2009	Jiro	Asahi Broadcasting / TV Asahi / Shōchiku	Episode 1	
2009	GodHand Teru	Manabu Nishimura	TBS		
2009	No Angel No Luck	Kataoka	TV Tokyo		
2009	Love Game	Hayato Aoyagi	Nippon TV	Episode 13	
2009	Urban Myths: Sepia	Kimihiko Sakita	WOWOW	Segment: Dead Love	
2010	Shinsengumi Peace Maker	Toshimaro Yoshida	MBS / TBS		
2010	Team Batista 2: The Triumphant Return of General Rouge	Hiroyuki Tsukada	Fuji TV	Episode 3	
2010	Uchū Inu Sakusen	Bakuto	TV Tokyo	Episode 2	
2010	Cold Cases	Naoki Tsukamoto	TV Asahi	Episode 6	
2010	Gachiban: Ultimatum 2	Hiroyuki Tsukuda		Episode 3	
2010	Ushijima the Loan Shark	Yoshinori	MBS / TBS	Episodes 5–8	
2011	Heaven's Flower: The Legend of Arcana	Yuichiro Manaka	TBS		
2011	The Amazing Race: Unfinished Business	Rio / Black Lion Rio	CBS	Voice dub; Episode 2	
2012	Good Life: Thank You, Dad, Goodbye	Ryoji Hosokawa	Kansai TV / Fuji TV		
2012	Keigo Higashino Mysteries	Ato	Fuji TV	Episode 4	
2012	High School Opera Company: Men's Team	Yūji Machida	Nippon TV / TBS		
2012	Sugarless	Mita Minoru / Santa	Nippon TV	Episodes 6–7, 11	
2012	High School Entrance Exam	Tetsuya Sawamura	Fuji TV / Fuji TV Next		
2015	Watashitachi ga Propose Sarenai no ni wa, 101 no Riyū ga Atte da na 2	Kuro	LaLa TV	Episode 1	
2015	Oretachi ga Propose Dekinai no ni wa, 3ttsu no Riyū shika nakuteda na	Kataoka	LaLa TV		
2016	Seifukusōsa 2	Yoshio Sugawara	TBS		
2016	Bakumatsu Prince	Izō Okada	Chukyo TV		
2018	Ochanomizu Rock	Junya Kiriyama	TV Tokyo	Episode 8	
2020	King of Dance	Osamu Tokimoto	Yomiuri TV		
2020	Crazy Rain	Iguchi	Asahi Broadcasting	Lead role	

=== TV animation ===
Year	Title	Role	Broadcast	Notes	Ref.
2021	Dinosaur Biyori	Alamosaurus; Quetzalcoatlus	Tokyo MX; BS11		

== Stage ==
Year	Title	Role	Location	Notes	Ref.
2005	Musical The Prince of Tennis: Side Yamabuki feat. St. Rudolph Gakuen	Sadaharu Inui	Osaka Mielparque Hall; Tokyo Mielparque Hall		
2005	Musical The Prince of Tennis: Concert Dream Live 2nd	Sadaharu Inui	Tokyo Bay NK Hall		
2005	Musical The Prince of Tennis: The Imperial Match Hyotei Gakuen	Sadaharu Inui	Japan Youth Hall; Osaka Mielparque Hall		
2005	Musical The Prince of Tennis: The Imperial Match Hyotei Gakuen In Winter	Sadaharu Inui	Japan Youth Hall; Osaka Mielparque Hall		
2006	Limit: What Is Your Story?	Og	Theater V Akasaka		
2006	Musical The Prince of Tennis: Concert Dream Live 3rd	Sadaharu Inui	Zepp Tokyo		
2006	Yume no Kobako ni Ribonwokakete: Kaichōban		Omotesando Fab	Director	
2007	Out of Order: Daijin Denshin	Himself	Aoyama Theatre	Daily appearance	
2007	D-Boys Stage Vol.1: Kanbai Orei	Saburō Nagatsuka / Ryōma Sakamoto	Zenrosai Hall Space Zero		
2008	D-Boys Stage Vol.2: Last Game	Yoshihiko Aimoto	Aoyama Theatre; Theatre Brava!	Lead role	
2008	Château	Sōichi Fujieda	New National Theatre (Small Theatre)	Lead role	
2009	Run with the Wind	Kōsuke Sakaki	Le Theatre Ginza; Toyamaken Kyōikubunka Hall; Meitetsu Hall; Denryoku Hall; Osaka Kōseinen Kinkaikan Geijutsu Hall; Fukuoka Sunpalace		
2009	Reading Stage: Love Letters	Andrew	Le Theatre Ginza		
2009	D-Boys Stage Vol.3: Karasu	Torakichi	Aoyama Theatre; Theatre Brava!		
2010	D-Boys Stage 2010 Trial-3: America	Kiyoshi Katō	Honda Theatre; Meitetsu Hall; Morinomiya Piloti Hall; Ryutopia Theatre; Kinokuniya Hall		
2011	D-Boys Stage 9th The Witness for the Prosecution: Azabu Hiroo Town Murder Case	Shin'nosuke Tōdō	Aoyama Theatre; Theatre Brava!		
2012	D-Boys Stage 10th Lonely Magnet Blues	Tōru	Bunkamura Theatre Cocoon; Theatre Brava!		
2012	Yoshimoto Hyakkunen Monogatari: Taishō to Goryōn-san Futari no Yume	Clerk	Namba Grand Kagetsu	Guest appearance	
2012	Legend of the Eight Samurai	Genpachi Inukai	New National Theatre (Middle Theatre); NHK Osaka Hall		
2013	Reading Stage: Shippo no Nakamatachi 3		The Galaxy Theatre		
2014	Handsome Rakugo: Act III	Performer	Akasaka Red Theatre		
2014	Tumbling: Final	Yūya Nishii	Kanagawa Arts Theatre; Theatre Brava! Akasaka ACT Theatre		
2014	Musical Black Butler: Lycoris that Blazes the Earth	Lau	Roppongi Blue Theatre; Umeda Arts Theatre Drama City		
2014	My Host: Blood Battle! Fukuoka Nakasu Edition	Tokio	Japan Youth Hall; Morinomiya Piloti Hall		
2015	Garantido	Yoshimura / Katsuo Sekikawa	Tokyo Metropolitan Theatre Playhouse; Hyogo Performing Arts Center Hankyū-chū Hall	D-Boys Stage 16th × TS Musical Foundation	
2015	Musical Black Butler: Lycoris that Blazes the Earth 2015	Lau	Umeda Arts Theatre Main Hall; Natori City Cultural Center Main Hall; Akasaka ACT Theatre; Canal City Theatre; Shanghai Art Theatre; Beijing Exhibition Center Theatre; Shenzhen Poly Theatre		
2015	Orange	Takashi Yamakura	Morinomiya Piloti Hall; Sunshine Theatre; Meitetsu Hall; Alpha Anabuki Hall; Koriyama City Cultural Center; Hitachi Systems Hall Sendai; Akita Prefectural Children's Hall; Doshin Hall	Amuse × People Purple	
2015	Mononofu Series: Mononofu White Tiger	Toshizō Hijikata	The Galaxy Theatre; Artopia Hall; Umeda Arts Theatre Drama City		
2016	My Host: The Final – Crash! Sakae Nagoya Edition	Tokio	The Galaxy Theatre	Guest appearance	
2016	Live Fantasy Fairy Tail	Jellal Fernandes	Sunshine Theatre; Shanghai Art Theatre		
2016	Opera Meiji Tokyo Love Song: Black Cat of the Hazy Moon	Ōgai Mori	Hakuhinkan Theatre		
2016	Mitsuru Matsuoka presents Daydream Babys	Arako Mama / Hirofumi Araki	Akasaka Blitz; Namba Hatch		
2016	Mononofu Series: Meditating Wolf Black Duck	Toshizō Hijikata	The Galaxy Theatre; Morinomiya Piloti Hall; Kitakyushu Arts Theatre Main Hall		
2016	Reading Stage: Gege	Takayuki Takano	Rikkō-kai Hall		
2016	The Smile Mermaid	Kent	Theatre 1010; Umeda Arts Theatre Drama City		
2017	My Host: Reborn	Tokio	Sunshine Theatre	Guest appearance	
2017	Musical Touken Ranbu: 300-Year Lullaby	Nikkari Aoe	AiiA 2.5 Theatre; Umeda Arts Theatre Main Hall; Zhuhai Grand Theatre		
2017	Ghostly	Tōsen	Japan Youth Hall; Hongqiao Artistic Center		
2017	Office Shika Produce Vol.M: Futodoki	Kageyama / Sadayū Murakaki	The Galaxy Theatre; Sankei Hall Breeze		
2017	ACCA: 13-Territory Inspection Dept.	Jean Otus	Shinagawa Club eX	Lead role	
2017	Musical Touken Ranbu: Shinken Ranbu Festival 2017	Nikkari Aoe	Nippon Budokan; Osaka-jō Hall; Saitama Super Arena; Guangzhou Gymnasium		
2018	My Host: Reborn – Sequel! Osaka Minami Edition	Tokio	Sunshine Theatre	Guest appearance	
2018	Mononofu Series: Kake Hayabusa Hito Yamato	Toshizō Hijikata	The Galaxy Theatre; Morinomiya Piloti Hall		
2018	Ochanomizu Rock: The Live Stage	Junya Kiriyama	AiiA 2.5 Theatre		
2018	Musical The Prince of Tennis: Dream Live 2018	Sadaharu Inui	Kobe World Memorial Hall	Guest appearance	
2018	Ran: Koan Ogata's Case Files	Musician / Wakasa	Osaka Shochikuza Theatre; Shinbashi Enbujō		
2018	Want-to-Know More about History Series: John Manjirō	Takechi Hanpeita / Jolly	Ex Theatre Roppongi		
2018	Opera Meiji Tokyo Love Song: Moonbow of My Fiancé	Ōgai Mori	Morinomiya Piloti Hall; Theatre 1010	Lead role	
2018	Bungo Stray Dogs on Stage: The Dark Age (Note: Alternatively subtitled Black Period)	Ango Sakaguchi	Sunshine Theatre; Morinomiya Piloti Hall		
2018	Musical Touken Ranbu: Shinken Ranbu Festival 2018	Nikkari Aoe	Fukui Sun Dome; Nippon Budokan; Sekisui Heim Super Arena; Osaka-jō Hall; Makuhari Messe International Exhibition Hall 9–11		
2019	Musical Touken Ranbu: 300-Year Lullaby 2019	Nikkari Aoe	The Galaxy Theatre; Sankei Hall Breeze; Kyoto Theatre; Tokyo Dome City Hall		
2019	Trump Series: Cocoon	Raffaello Delico	Sunshine Theatre; Sankei Hall Breeze	Appears in Dark of the Moon and Upon One of the Stars	
2019	Ginga: Nagareboshi Gin – Kizuna	Akame	The Galaxy Theatre; AiiA 2.5 Theatre Kobe		
2019	Reading Stage: Lily and Rose	Hikaru Amano	Shinagawa Club eX		
2019	Koi wo Yomu Vol.2: Running Away is Shameful but Useful	Hiramasa Tsuzaki	Hulic Hall Tokyo		
2019	Yu Yu Hakusho	Koenma	Theatre 1010; Morinomiya Piloti Hall; Momochi Palace; Ichinomiya Community Hall		
2019	Musical Touken Ranbu: Utago Ranbu Frenzy 2019	Nikkari Aoe	Big Hat; Sekisui Heim Super Arena; Hokkai Kitayell; Fukuoka Kokusai Center; Hiroshima Green-Arena; Saitama Super Arena; Aichi Sky Expo Exhibition Hall A Osaka-jō Hall; Musashino Forest Sport Plaza Main Hall		
2020	My Host: The Last Live – Love to the End!	Tokio	Japan Youth Hall	Guest appearance	
2020	Touken Ranbu Online 5th Anniversary Touken Ranbu: The Great Performance	Nikkari Aoe	Tokyo Dome	Canceled	
2020	Hypnosis Mic – Division Rap Battle – Rule the Stage: Track.2	Hifumi Izanami / Gigolo	Shinagawa Prince Hotel Stellar Ball	May run canceled	
2020	King of Dance	Osamu Tokimoto	Cool Japan Park Osaka WW Hall; Hulic Hall Tokyo; Nagoya Civic Assembly Hall		
2020	Ginga: Nagareboshi Gin – Gajō Kessen-hen	Akame	The Galaxy Theatre		
2020	Yu Yu Hakusho: Act 2	Koenma	Shinagawa Prince Hotel Stellar Ball; Cool Japan Park Osaka WW Hall; Kyoto Theatre	Also director	
2021	Hypnosis Mic – Division Rap Battle – Rule the Stage: Track.4	Hifumi Izanami / Gigolo	Tokyo Dome City Hall; Osaka Mielparque Hall; Fukuoka Sunpalace		
2021	Hypnosis Mic – Division Rap Battle – Rule the Stage: Track.2 Replay	Hifumi Izanami / Gigolo	Shinagawa Prince Hotel Stellar Ball		
2021	Bungo Stray Dogs on Stage: Dead Apple	Ango Sakaguchi	Cool Japan Park Osaka WW Hall; Nippon Seinen-kan Hall	Video appearance	
2021	Musical Touken Ranbu: Nikkari Aoe Solo Performance – 2021 Spring Run	Nikkari Aoe	Hakodate Citizen Hall, Main Hall; Kyara Hall/Tonan Public Hall; Omagari Civic Center, Main Hall; Shibata Civic Center; Toyama Prefectural Hall; Komatsu Urara Theater, Main Hall; Sabae City Culture Center; Umeda Arts Theater, Main Hall; Nara Prefecture Cultural Hall, International Hall; Yonago City Cultural Center; Izumo Civic Hall; Momochi Palace; Arao General Cultural Center, Main Hall; Houzan Hall	Lead role	
2021	Hypnosis Mic – Division Rap Battle – Rule the Stage: Battle of Pride	Hifumi Izanami / Gigolo	Maruzen Intec Arena Osaka; Pia Arena MM		
2021	Koi wo Yomu in Crea: Running Away is Shameful but Useful	Hiramasa Tsuzaki	Theater Creation		
2021	Musical Touken Ranbu: Nikkari Aoe Solo Performance – 2021 Autumn Run	Nikkari Aoe	Minamisoma Civic Cultural Hall, Main Hall; Yuki Civic Culture Center ACROSS, Main Hall; Yamanashi Prefectural Citizen's Culture Hall, Small Hall; Ichinomiya Civic Hall; Otsu Civic Hall, Main Hall; Kinan Cultural Hall, Main Hall; Okayama Civic Hall; Susaki Seaside Stage; Yahatahama Civic Cultural Hall, Main Hall; J:COM HorutoHall OITA, Main Hall; Miyazaki Municipal Culture Hall, Main Hall	Lead role	
2022	Musical Touken Ranbu: Nikkari Aoe Solo Performance – 2022 Spring Run	Nikkari Aoe	Okinawa Civic Hall; Isahaya Culture Hall; Tosu Civic Hall; Shimonoseki City Lifelong Learning Plaza, Main Hall; Uji Culture Center, Main Hall; Kobe Kokusai Hall; Nagaragawa Convention Center; Hamamatsu Hamakita Culture Center, Main Hall; Sagami Women's University Green Hall; Shibukawa Civic Hall, Main Hall; Sano Culture Center, Main Hall; Aomori Civic Hall; Natori Performing Arts Center, Main Hall	Lead role; Natori run canceled	
2022	Hypnosis Mic – Division Rap Battle – Rule the Stage: Rep LIVE side M.T.C	Hifumi Izanami / Gigolo	KT Zepp Yokohama	Guest appearance	
2022	Jet Black Ten: The Beginning Story	Yōnosuke Udai / Kutarō	Sunshine Theatre; Umeda Arts Theatre Drama City	Lead role	
2022	Musical Touken Ranbu: Nikkari Aoe Solo Performance – 2022 Autumn Run	Nikkari Aoe	Showa Women's University, Hitomi Memorial Hall; Wako Civic Culture Center; Chiba City Civic Hall; Sendai Denryoku Hall; Yamagata Citizens' Hall, Main Hall; Hokuto Culture Hall, Middle Hall; Echizen Culture Center, Main Hall; Kakiyasu City Hall (Kuwana Civic Center); JMS Aster Plaza, Main Hall; Tokushima Arts Foundation for Culture; Minoh Theatre for the Performing Arts, Main Hall; Rexxam Hall, Main Hall	Lead role	
2022	Hypnosis Mic – Division Rap Battle – Rule the Stage: Bad Ass Temple VS Matenrō	Shinagawa Prince Hotel Stellar Ball	Hifumi Izanami / Gigolo		
2025	Musical Fate/Zero: The Sword of Promised Victory	Kiritsugu Emiya	Theater Milano-za, Tokyo; Sky Theater MBS, Osaka	Lead role	

== Official DVDs ==
Year	DVD	DVD cover	Release date	JPN certification
2007	Prince Series D-BOYS Collection – Hirofumi Araki		May 16, 2007	
