= Tetsuya Makita =

Japanese actor (born 1984)

- Born: June 7, 1984 (age 41); Aichi Prefecture, Japan
- Occupation: Actor
- Years active: 2006–present

Tetsuya Makita (牧田 哲也, Makita Tetsuya; born June 7, 1984) is a Japanese actor, best known for the role of Takeshi Momoshiro of the fourth generation Seigaku cast in The Prince of Tennis musical series, Tenimyu. Makita was a member of the acting unit D-Boys, produced by Watanabe Entertainment.

== Career ==
Makita started his career as a fashion and promotional model, working campaigns for Dariya's Men's Party, Nissen Holdings and NTT DoCoMo, among others. In July 2006 Makita took part in Watanabe Entertainment's 3rd D-Boys open audition, winning the second place, after Grand Prix winner Tomo Yanagishita, as well as De-View Magazine's Oricon Entertainment award. He was formally added to D-Boys in July 2007. Makita's first television role as a regular cast member was in the 2007 tokusatsu comedy series Bishōjo Celebrity Panchanne, in the role of Kiyoshi Shinjō, a young police officer investigating the identity of title heroine Panchanne.

=== As Takeshi Momoshiro in The Prince of Tennis Musicals ===
Soon after Panchanne's end, Makita won the role of Takeshi Momoshiro, the friendly 2nd year regular of Seigaku Middle School's tennis club, in the Prince of Tennis musical series, Tenimyu, as part of the fourth generation Seigaku cast. He has become the fourth actor to play Momoshiro, making his debut in The Progressive Match Higa Chuu feat. Rikkai performance on December 12, 2007. The role was previously played by Shinpei Takagi in third cast and by fellow D-Boys member Masaki Kaji in the cast's second formation. Makita graduated from the series in 2009 after the final performance of Dream Live 6th; his role was carried on by actor Toshihiro Nobeyama.

In his run of the series, Makita was able to work alongside fellow D-Boys member Tomo Yanagishita.

== Filmography ==
=== Television ===
- Shinigami no Ballad, episodes 2, 5 and 6 (TV Tokyo, 2007)
- Bishōjo Celebrity Panchanne, as Kiyoshi Shinjō (TV Tokyo, 2007)
- Kamen Rider Decade, Arata/Kamen Rider Gatack, episodes 16 and 17 (TV Asahi, 2009)

=== Movies ===
- Takumi-kun Series: Soshite Harukaze ni Sasayaite as Daisuke Nozaki (2008)
- Hoshisuna no Shima no Chiisana Tenshi ~Mermaid Smile~ (2010)
- Vampire Stories: CHASERS as Asagi (2011)
- "Itazura na kiss the movie: proposal (2017)

== Other media ==
=== Theatre ===
D-Boys

- D-Boys Stage Vol.1: Kanbai Onrei (2007)
- D-Boys Stage Vol.2: Last Game (2008, in pre-production)

Tenimyu: The Prince of Tennis Musical Series (as Takeshi Momoshiro)

- The Prince of Tennis Musical: Progressive Match Higa feat. Rikkaidai (In Winter of 2007–2008)
- The Prince of Tennis Musical: Dream Live 5th (2008)
- The Prince of Tennis Musical: The Imperial Presence Hyotei Gakuen feat. Higa Chuu (2008)
- The Prince of Tennis Musical: The Treasure Match Shitenhouji feat. Hyotei Gakuen (2008–2009)
- The Prince of Tennis Musical: Dream Live 6th (2009)
