= Shingo Nakagawa =

Japanese actor

- Born: May 8, 1983 (age 43); Tochigi Prefecture, Japan
- Occupation: Actor
- Years active: 2005-present
- Website: http://www.watanabepro.co.jp/nakagawasingo/

Shingo Nakagawa (中川 真吾, Nakagawa Shingo; born May 8, 1983) is a Japanese stage and screen actor from Tochigi Prefecture.

Nakagawa was affiliated with the acting group D-BOYS, produced by Watanabe Entertainment. He joined D-BOYS on the group's second open audition in July 2005, receiving the Judge's Choice special award.

== Acting career ==
=== Theatre ===
- Mori no Maerchen, as Cain (2006)
- Cooky Crown, as Tazawa Minoru (2007)
- Out of Order (2007)
- D-BOYS STAGE vol.1: Kanbai Onrei, as Takumi/Nagakura Shinpachi (2007)
- Sukedachi (2007)
- D-BOYS STAGE vol.2 (2008, in pre-production)

=== Television ===
- Hanbun no Tsuki ga Noboru Sora live action, as Tamotsu Yamanishi (TV Tokyo, 2006)
- DD-BOYS, as himself (TV Asahi, 2006)
- Puzzle, as Kentaro Kamiya (TV Asahi, 2007)
- Tsubasa no Oreta Tenchi Tachi 3 (Fuji TV, 2007)
- Tadashii Ouji no Tsukuri Kata (TV Tokyo, 2008)
- Kamen Rider W live action, as Shun Makura (TV Asahi, 2009)

=== Cinema ===
- Drift 5 (2008, in pre-production)

=== Voice acting ===
- Kemono no Gotoku Hisoyaka Ni: Kotodama Tsukai, as Shigyou (2007)
