= Masahiro Usui =

Japanese actor

- 碓井 将大
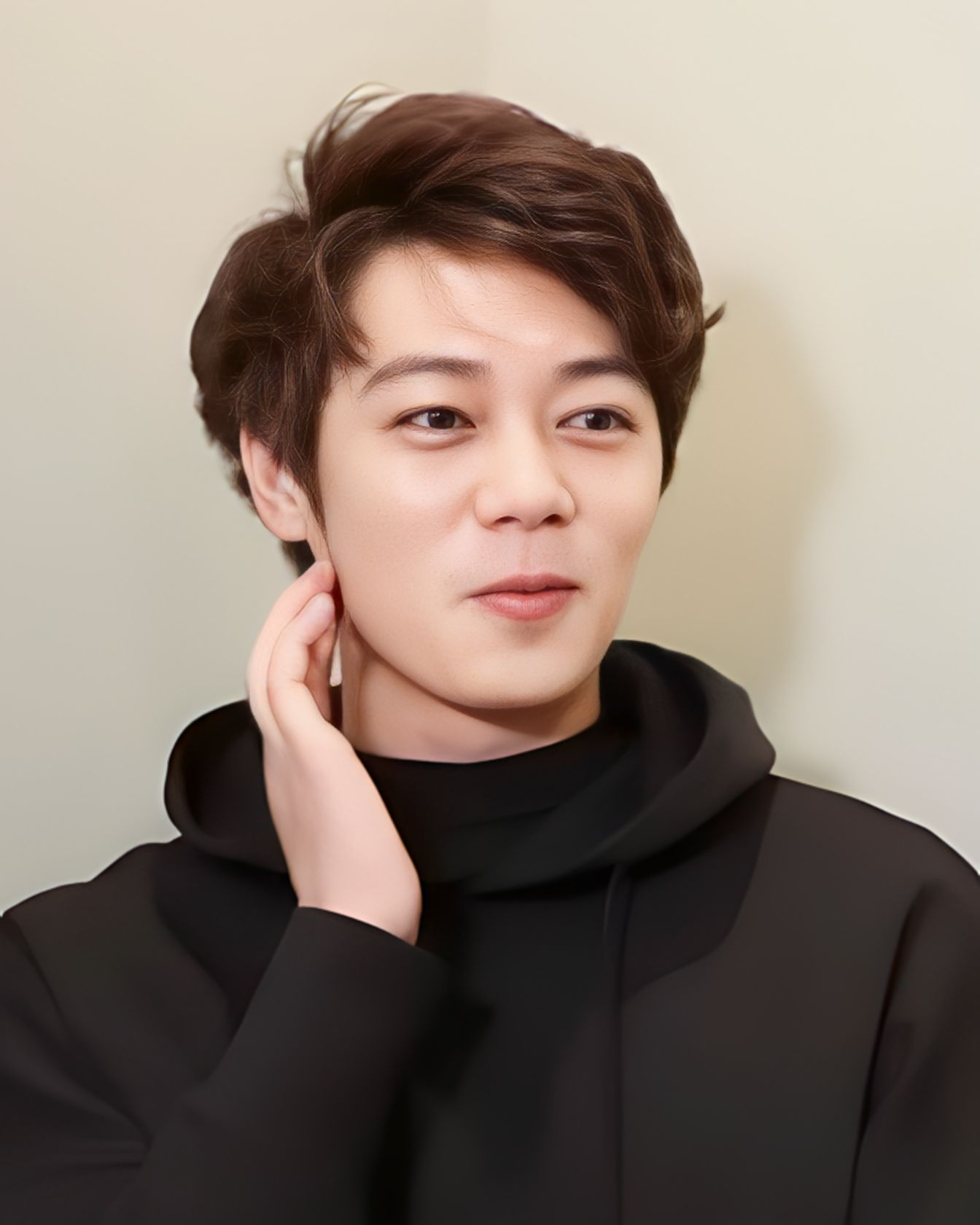
- Usui in 2023
- Born: December 3, 1991 (age 34); Tokyo, Japan
- Years active: 2007–present
- Website: View profile

Masahiro Usui (碓井 将大, Usui Masahiro; born December 3, 1991) is a Japanese actor and member of the acting troupe D-BOYS, produced by Watanabe Entertainment.

== Biography ==
Usui joined D-BOYS through the 4th D-BOYS open audition, held on May 28, 2007. Winner of the audition's Grand Prix, Usui was officially added to the group on December 30, 2007, after making his entertainment debut on the TV Tokyo comedy series ChocoMimi.

== Filmography ==
=== Film ===
- The Degrees of Pain (2026)
