= Masashi Mikami =

Japanese actor

Masashi Mikami (三上 真史, Mikami Masashi) is a Japanese actor. He has appeared in several dramas, with one of his most notable roles being Souta Mogami/Bouken Blue in the Super Sentai series GoGo Sentai Boukenger. He has recently been accepted into the D-Boys acting troupe. He also acted in the movie Kindan no koi. A gardening enthusiast, Mikami currently hosts the gardening show Shumi no Engei on NHK Educational TV.

== Career ==
=== Television ===
- Kyōryū Sentai Zyuranger: Satoshi's friend (TV Asahi, 1992/1993)
- GoGo Sentai Boukenger: Souta Mogami/Bouken Blue (2006/2007)
- Bihada Sentai Sparanger: SpaYellow (2007)
- Shumi no Engei: Host
- Kamen Rider Drive: Hiroki Nikaido (2015)
- Kamen Rider Saber: Kenshin Nagamine (2020)

=== Cinema ===
- Worst By Chance - Minor Role (2003)
- Swing Girls - Yusuke (2004)
- GoGo Sentai Boukenger The Movie: The Greatest Precious - Souta Mogami/Bouken Blue (Toei, 2006)
- GoGo Sentai Boukenger vs. Super Sentai - Souta Mogami/Bouken Blue (Toei, 2007)
- Juken Sentai Gekiranger vs Boukenger - Souta Mogami/Bouken Blue (Toei, 2008)
- Kindan no Koi - Ritsu (2008)
- Hoshisuna no Shima no Chiisana Tenshi ~Mermaid Smile~ (2010)

=== Internet Series ===
- Tokyo Prom Queen - Takeshi (2008)
