= Masaya Nakamura (actor) =

Japanese actor (born 1986)

- Born: April 30, 1986 (age 40); Osaka, Japan
- Occupation: actor
- Years active: 2007–present
- Height: 1.92 m (6 ft 4 in)
- Spouse: Mari Yaguchi (m. 2011; div. 2013)
- Website: http://www.watanabepro.co.jp/nakamuramasaya

Masaya Nakamura (中村 昌也, Nakamura Masaya; born April 30, 1986) is a Japanese stage and screen actor from Osaka.

Nakamura was affiliated with the acting group D-BOYS, produced by Watanabe Entertainment. He joined the D-BOYS group in July 2007.

== Personal life ==
Nakamura married television personality and singer Mari Yaguchi in May 2011. The two had planned to marry in March of that year, but postponed to May due to the Tōhoku earthquake and tsunami. On May 21, 2013, Josei Seven reported that Yaguchi and Nakamura had been living apart since late February after Nakamura discovered she was having an extramarital affair with model Kenzo Umeda through used bedsheets and Umeda hiding in the closet naked. In the following days there were more press reports about multiple instances of alleged infidelity by Yaguchi; however, Yaguchi alleged that Nakamura had been physically abusive towards her. On May 30, 2013, the public relations firm for Yaguchi and Nakamura announced that they had submitted their divorce papers.

== Filmography ==
=== Television ===
- Puzzle, as Tetsuya Tanno (TV Asahi, 2007)
- Gakumon no Susume, as Shun Tokunaga (TV Asahi, 2007)
- Hatachi no Koibito (TBS, 2007)
- Ouran High School Host Club, as Morinozuka Takashi (TBS, 2011)
- Hana Moyu, as Kondō Isami (NHK, 2015)

=== Cinema ===
- Arakure Knight (2007)

=== Theatre ===
- Musical Dear Boys, as Shinichi Takeuchi (2007)
- D-BOYS STAGE vol.2 (2008, in pre-production)
