= Hosoya Jūdayū =

Japanese samurai (1839–1907)

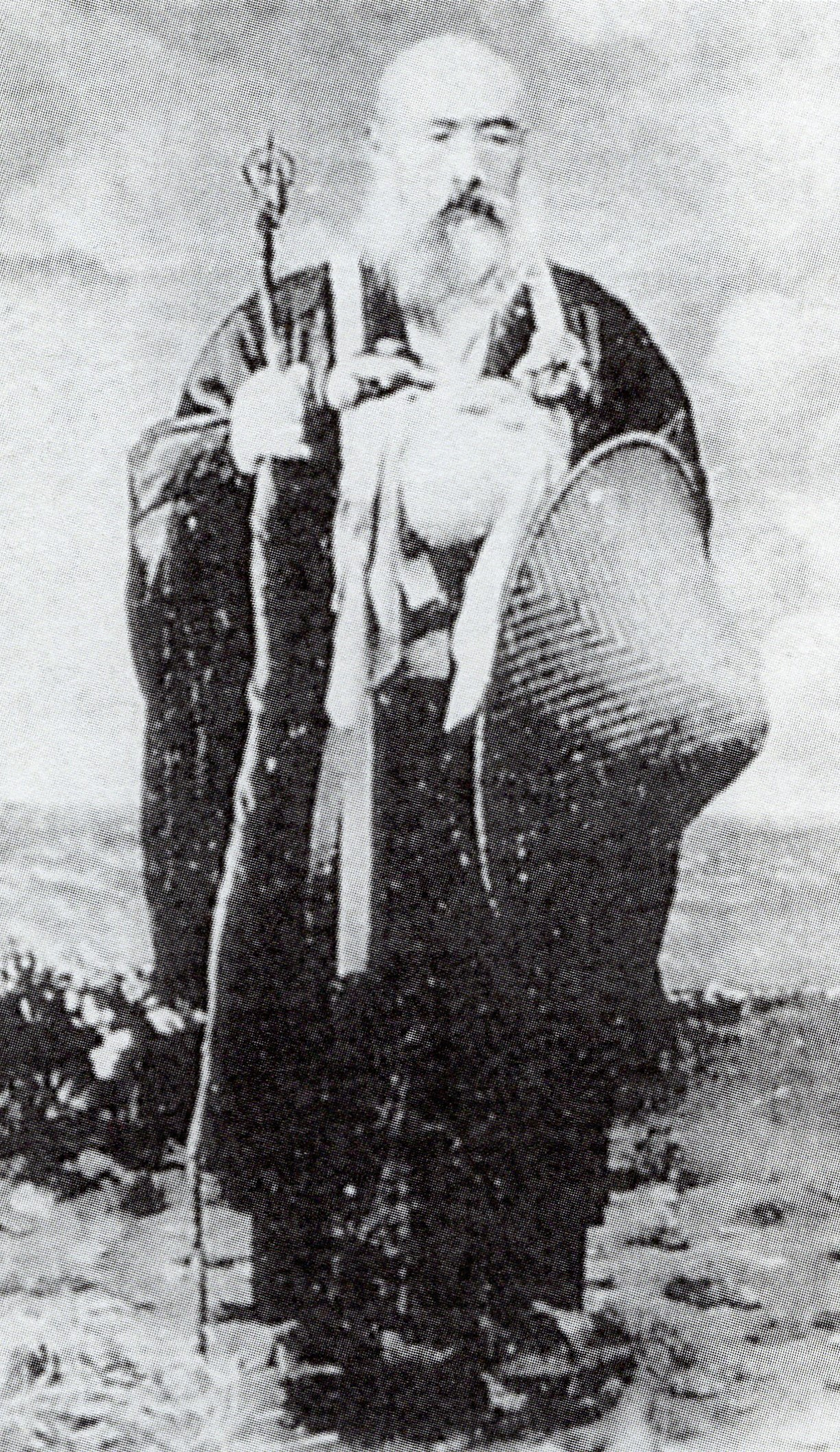
Hosoya Jūdayū

Hosoya Jūdayū (細谷 十太夫; 1839–1907) was a Japanese samurai of the late Edo period, who served the Date clan of Sendai han, and was famous for his role in the Boshin War. He was also known as Naohide 直秀 and Buichiro 武一郎.

== Biography ==
The Hosoya family claimed descent from Hosoya Jinbei, a man of Yamashiro, who took his name from Hosoya village in Date district. For generations they served the Date clan as senior guardsmen, with a stipend of 50 koku. Hosoya's date of birth is uncertain; some believe he was born in 1840, while others say 1845. Hosoya lost his father and mother at a young age, ending up in the care of his grandfather, Sanjūrō. During his youth, he studied sword, spear, archery, gunnery, and bugyō (believed to be a form of aikido). His first job, as per his grandfather's wishes, was as a temple acolyte at Chūrenji Temple in Shiogama. Later, he became a construction officer, as well as briefly serving in the Sendai security force in Kyoto, at the gates of the Imperial Palace.

After the outbreak of the Boshin War, he was appointed a scout officer, and was active everywhere from Shōnai, to Shirakawa, to Yonezawa, even as far south as Mito. Led a group of militia informally known as the Karasugumi ("Crow Brigade"), because of their black clothing. In praise for his skill in guerilla warfare, Sendai lord Date Yoshikuni appointed him Captain of Pages, and bestowed on him the honorary name of Buichirō. After the dissolution of the domains, Hosoya entered the field land reclamation, working together with such famous figures as Enomoto Takeaki, Nagai Naoyuki, and Sawa Tarōzaemon. Entering the Imperial Japanese Army in the mid-1870s, he served as a lieutenant in the Seinan War, receiving the Order of the Rising Sun for his distinguished service in combat. Later served in the First Sino-Japanese War before returning to Sendai and becoming a monk by the name of Asen (鴉仙); this combined the character for "crow" (鴉) with the "Sen" (仙) of "Sendai".

Hosoya died at his hermitage in Sendai, in 1907. His son Hosoya Jūtarō (1862–1933) was also famous, and a farmer, as his father once was.

Today, Hosoya's jinbaori (armor surcoat) is on display in the Tōhoku History Museum, in Miyagi Prefecture.
