= D-Boys =

- Origin: Tokyo, Japan
- Occupation: Actors
- Years active: 2004–present
- Labels: Watanabe Entertainment
- Spinoffs: D2; D-Date
- Website: www.d-boys.com

D-Boys (stylized as D-BOYS) is a Japanese acting troupe affiliated with Watanabe Entertainment. The D in the group's name stands for "Drama" (acting work), "Dream", "Debut", "Discovery" and "Development" (growth and advancement).

Although the D-Boys are promoted as a group and members occasionally work together on the same projects, each actor develops his career independently from his fellow members in their own television, cinema and theatre projects. New D-Boys members are regularly selected through public audition events with interactive participation of fan club members.

== Members ==
=== Current members ===
- Masato Wada (和田 正人, Wada Masato; born August 25, 1979)
- Hiroki Suzuki (鈴木 裕樹, Suzuki Hiroki; born October 3, 1983)
- Hirofumi Araki (荒木 宏文, Araki Hirofumi; born June 14, 1983)
- Kōji Seto (瀬戸 康史, Seto Kōji; born May 18, 1988)
- Masahiro Usui (碓井 将大, Usui Masahiro; born December 3, 1991)
- Arata Horii (堀井 新太, Horii Arata; born June 26, 1992)
- Syo Jinnai (陳内 将, Jin'nai Shō; born January 16, 1988)
- Ryosuke Ikeoka (池岡 亮介, Ikeoka Ryōsuke; born September 3, 1993)
- Yuki Yamada (山田 裕貴, Yamada Yūki; born September 18, 1990)
- Shotaro Okubo (大久保 祥太郎, Ōkubo Shōtarō; born August 27, 1995)
- Jun Shison (志尊 淳, Shison Jun; born March 5, 1995)
- Masaki Nakao (中尾 暢樹, Nakao Masaki; born November 27, 1996)

=== Former members ===
- Ichitaro Yamazaki (一太郎, Yamazaki Ichitarō; born July 19, 1980)
- Katsuki Nakamura (中村 勝樹, Nakamura Katsuki; born March 23, 1990)
- Shintaro Tetsu (鐵 進太郎, Tetsu Shintarō; born September 29, 1986)
- Yuma Minakawa (皆川 佑馬, Minakawa Yūma; born October 1, 1984)
- Yu Shirota (城田 優, Shirota Yū; born December 26, 1985)
- Kouhei Kumai (熊井 幸平, Kumai Kōhei; born July 27, 1990)
- Masaya Nakamura (中村 昌也, Nakamura Masaya; born April 30, 1986)
- Shingo Nakagawa (中川 真吾, Nakagawa Shingo; born May 8, 1983)
- Yūichi Nakamura (中村 優一, Nakamura Yūichi; born October 8, 1987)
- Yuya Endo (遠藤 雄弥, Endō Yūya; born March 20, 1987)
- Masaki Kaji (加治 将樹, Kaji Masaki; born January 29, 1988)
- Osamu Adachi (足立 理, Adachi Osamu; born December 22, 1987)
- Shunji Igarashi (五十嵐 隼士, Igarashi Shunji; born August 7, 1986)
- Toru Kamitsuru (上鶴 徹, Kamitsuru Tōru; born June 26, 1989)
- Taito Hashimoto (橋本 汰斗, Hashimoto Taito; born November 1, 1991)
- Kenki Yamaguchi (山口 賢貴, Yamaguchi Kenki; born July 17, 1986)
- Yoichiro Omi (近江 陽一郎, Ōmi Yōichirō; born April 5, 1989)
- Ryuki Takahashi (高橋 龍輝, Takahashi Ryūki; born March 28, 1993)
- Shintaro Akutsu (阿久津 愼太郎, Akutsu Shintarō; born June 21, 1995)
- Kotaro Yanagi (柳 浩太郎, Yanagi Kōtarō; born December 21, 1985)
- Shion Tsuchiya (土屋 シオン, Tsuchiya Shion; born July 7, 1992)
- Takuya Negishi (根岸 拓哉, Negishi Takuya; born March 12, 1996)
- Atsushi Shiramata (白又 敦, Shiramata Atsushi; born March 22, 1994)
- Tetsuya Makita (牧田 哲也, Makita Tetsuya; born June 7, 1984)
- Tomo Yanagishita (柳下 大, Yanagishita Tomo; born June 3, 1988)
- Masashi Mikami (三上 真史, Mikami Masashi; born June 20, 1983)
- Yukito Nishii (西井 幸人, Nishii Yukito; born June 14, 1995)
- Ryo Mitsuya (三津谷 亮, Mitsuya Ryō; born February 11, 1988)
- Atsushi Arai (荒井 敦史, Arai Atsushi; born May 23, 1993)
- Takahisa Maeyama (前山 剛久, Maeyama Takahisa; born February 7, 1991)
- Shuto Miyazaki (宮崎 秋人, Miyazaki Shūto; born September 3, 1990)
- Yusuke Yamada (山田 悠介, Yamada Yūsuke; born July 29, 1987)

=== D2 members ===
In 2009, D2 was formed as D-Boys' younger brother group. In October 2013, D2 joined D-Boys to become its sub-group.

Current members

- Yukito Nishii
- Ryo Mitsuya
- Syo Jinnai
- Atsushi Arai
- Ryosuke Ikeoka
- Yuki Yamada
- Takahisa Maeyama
- Shotaro Okubo
- Jun Shison

Former members

- Ryotaro Konno (今野 良太郎, Kon'no Ryōtarō; born August 23, 1993)
- Toru Kamitsuru
- Kenki Yamaguchi
- Yoichiro Omi
- Shintaro Akutsu
- Shion Tsuchiya
- Takuya Negishi
- Atsushi Shiramata

== Group projects ==
In addition to their individual careers, the D-Boys are also involved in collective projects, as part of the group promotion work.

=== DD-Boys ===
DD-Boys was a drama-documentary variety series, featuring the D-Boys members as themselves. Each episode had a short staged section following the plot of the members living in the fictional D-House and seeking ways to raise money for rent, followed by a documentary section showing the members undertaking tasks or challenges to raise that money. Some tasks were inspired by the actor's own personality -e.g., a member who was known to enjoy singing or dancing would have a task related to that hobby, etc. The show was 23 episodes long and aired from 10 April 2006 to 25 September 2006 on TV Asahi.

=== Stage works ===
Series	Title		Year / date	Stage Info	Cast	
D-Live	1st D-Live		2004	Live entertainment show	All members	
D-Live	2nd D-Live		2004	Live entertainment show	All members	
D-Live	3rd D-Live		March 2005	Live entertainment show	All members	
D-Live	4th D-Live		May 2006	Live entertainment show	All members	
Out of Order	Out of Order		March 2007	Live entertainment show	Regular Performers: Yuya Endo; Masaki Kaji; Kouhei Kumai; Guest performances by all other members	
D-Boys Stage	Vol 1. Kanba Onrei		June 2007	Musical	All members with guest performers: Yu Shirota; Masato Wada; Shunji Igarashi; Hiroki Suzuki; Hirofumi Araki	
D-Boys Stage	Vol 2. The Last Game		June 2008	Musical	All members plus guest cast A: Endo Yuya; Yuichi Nakamura; Kouhei Kumai	All members plus guest aast B: Shunji Igarashi; Koji Seto; Masahiro Usui
D-Boys Stage	Vol 3.	Karasu 04	April 2009	Musical	Cast A	Hiroki Suzuki; Shunji Igarashi; Masaki Kaji; Kotaro Yanagi; Tomo Yanagishita; Osamu Adachi; Masaya Nakamura; Ryuki Takahashi; Taito Hashimoto; Yusuke Yamada
D-Boys Stage	Vol 3.	Karasu 10	October 2009	Musical	Cast B	Endo Yuya; Hirofumi Araki; Shingo Nakagawa; Masato Wada; Yuichi Nakamura; Koji Seto; Masashi Mikami; Masahiro Usui; Tetsuya Makita; Kenki Yamaguchi (D2 member); Toru Kamitsuru (D2 member); Ryo Mitsuya (D2 member); Syo Jinnai (D2 member)
D-Boys Stage	Vol 4.	Now Loading	April 28, 2010	Musical	Cast A	Endo Yuya; Shunji Igarashi; Masato Wada; Yusuke Yamada
D-Boys Stage	Vol 4.	The Last Game	August 26, 2010	Musical	Cast B	Koji Seto; Yuichi Nakamura; Kotaro Yanagi; Osamu Adachi; Shingo Nakagawa; Tetsuya Makita; Ryuki Takahashi; Masashi Mikami; Masahiro Usui
D-Boys Stage	Vol 4.	America	November 3, 2010	Musical	Cast C	Hiroki Suzuki; Hirofumi Araki; Masaki Kaji; Tomo Yanagishita

=== Fan club events ===
The D-Boys hold special events where fan club members have the opportunity to meet the actors in person and interact with them in camp activities and games such as cook-offs, tug-of-war, etc., in which the members are split into teams, leading groups of fans to compete with each other.

- Official Fan club Day Camp Bus Tour (November 13, 2005)
- Official Fan club Limited Bus Tour (August 25 to August 27, 2006)
- Official Fan club 3rd Anniversary Bus Tour (September 6 to 8, 2007)

=== Live tours ===
During the summer of 2009, 19 D-Boys members, including Yu Shirota participated in performances for fans at Akiba Plaza called "Kotoshi no Natsu wa Mainichi Dokoka de D-Boys Uki-uki Yatta Hohohoy" or for short, Natsu Doko. There were 49 performances in total of dances, songs and skits. New D-Boys member, Yusuke Yamada, was introduced to fans during these performances. Three CD+DVD sets featuring different recorded audio theater by separate groups of D-Boys members and footage of Natsu Doko were released on December 16, 2009.

Due to the success and demand of Natsu Doko, a live tour called Fuyu Doko 2009 was held in the winter of 2009 with 19 D-Boys members and Yu Shirota visiting major cities in Japan to promote the Natsu Doko 2009 CD+DVD release. It was the first live tour around the nation for the group.

=== Radio ===
- Marvelous Radio Vibration (May 5, 2005 - April 1, 2006) - weekly radio show hosted by Yu Shirota, Kotaro Yanagi and Yukki.
- D-Radio Boys (October 2007/present) - weekly radio show hosted by Masato Wada and Shunji Igarashi, featuring guest D-Boys members.

=== Other ===
- 43rd Secret New Years' Performance Tournament "Young Man Colosseum" (January 1, 2006) - television guest appearance, performed by Masaki Kaji and Hiroki Suzuki.
- 44th Secret New Years' Performance Tournament "Chinese Lion Dance" (January 1, 2007) - television guest appearance, performed by Yuya Endo, Masaki Kaji, Hiroki Suzuki, Masato Wada and Yuma Minakawa.
- 45th Secret New Years' Performance Tournament "Ikemen Jumpers" (January 1, 2008) - television guest appearance, performed by Masaki Kaji, Kouhei Kumai, Koji Seto, and Shingo Nakagawa.
- 45th Secret New Years' Performance Tournament "Kakushi Gei Dancing Ikemen" (Fuji TV - January 1, 2009) - television guest appearance, performed by Tomo Yanagishita, Endo Yuya, Masaki Kaji, Makita Tetsuya, Taito Hashimoto, and Ryuki Takahashi.

== Media ==
D-Boys members have released merchandise in the form of photobooks, DVDs and CDs individually, or in relation to a work project (e.g. character image CDs/photobooks). As a group, they have released a calendar featuring all D-Boys members and the following items:

=== Official photobooks ===
Year	Title	Description	Publisher	Release date	ISBN
2005	D-Boys	D-Boys First Photobook	Tokyo News Agency	April 27, 2005	ISBN 4-924566-42-X
2006	Start!	D-Boys 2nd Photobook	Gakken Co., Ltd.	March 15, 2006	ISBN 4-05-403035-1
2008	Dash	D-Boys Third Photobook	Kadokawa Marketing Co., Ltd.	December 2008	ISBN 978-4-04-895035-0
2010	Darling	D-Boys Fourth Photobook	Shufu-to-Seikatsu Sha, Ltd.	March 2010	ISBN 978-4-04-895035-0

=== DVD series ===
Series	Title	DVD info	Members	Release date
D-Boys Boy Friend Series	No Fiction	Volume 1	Shunji Igarashi	June 24, 2009
D-Boys Boy Friend Series	Self-Discovery	Volume 2	Yuichi Nakamura	August 21, 2009
D-Boys Boy Friend Series	Peacemaker	Volume 3	Hiroki Suzuki	September 18, 2009
D-Boys Boy Friend Series	Sugao	Volume 4	Hirofumi Araki	October 23, 2009
D-Boys Boy Friend Series	Tomorrow	Volume 5	Tomo Yanagishita	November 26, 2009
D-Boys Boy Friend Series	Yu Channel	Volume 6	Yu Shirota	December 23, 2009
D-Boys Boy Friend Series	7 Heroes	Volume 7	Yuichi Nakamura; Shunji Igarashi; Koji Seto; Hiroki Suzuki; Hirofumi Araki; Masahiro Usui; Masashi Mikami	February 24, 2010
D-Boys Boy Friend Series	Super Rookie	Volume 8	Ryuki Takahashi	March 25, 2010
D-Boys Boy Friend Series	Tight Rizm	Volume 9	Taito Hashimoto	April 21, 2010
D-Boys Boy Friend Series	Set Out	Volume 10	Koji Seto	May 26, 2010
Natsu Doko 2009	Natsu Doko 2009 Kaze - Team Wind version	DVD for D-Boys Natsu Doko 2009	All members with Yu Shirota	December 16, 2009
Natsu Doko 2009	Natsu Doko 2009 Yama - Team Mountain version	DVD for D-Boys Natsu Doko 2009	All members with Yu Shirota	December 16, 2009
Natsu Doko 2009	Natsu Doko 2009 Kawa - Team River version	DVD for D-Boys Natsu Doko 2009	All members with Yu Shirota	December 16, 2009
Haru Doko 2010	Haru Doko 2010: Momo	DVD for D-Boys Haru Doko 2010	Momo members	July 14, 2010
Haru Doko 2010	Haru Doko 2010: Sakura	DVD for D-Boys Haru Doko 2010	Sakura members	July 14, 2010

=== Discography ===
The D-Boys have released on December 16, 2009, three CD+DVD sets featuring different recorded audio theater by separate groups of D-Boys members on CD and footage of Natsu Doko on DVD. Natsu Doko 2009 debuted on the Oricon Charts in 11th.

Year	Title	CD info	Members	Chart debut	Track listings
2009	Natsu Doko 2009 Kaze - Team Wind version	Audio Theater album by D-Boys	Team Wind members: Tomo Yanagishita; Endo Yuya; Masato Wada; Hiroki Suzuki; Masaya Nakamura	11	D-Boys CD and DVD: Natsu no Kakehashi
2009	Natsu Doko 2009 Yama - Team Mountain version	Audio Theater album by D-Boys	Team Mountain members: Shunji Igarashi; Kotaro Yanagi; Osamu Adachi; Masashi Mikami; Yusuke Yamada	11	D-Boys CD and DVD: Natsu no Kakehashi
2009	Natsu Doko 2009 Kawa - Team River version	Audio Theater album by D-Boys	Team River members: Yuichi Nakamura; Hirofumi Araki; Masaki Kaji; Tetsuya Makita; Masahiro Usui	11	D-Boys CD and DVD: Natsu no Kakehashi
