= Shunji Igarashi =

Japanese actor

- 五十嵐 隼士
- Born: August 7, 1986 (age 39); Nagano-ken, Japan
- Occupation: Actor
- Years active: 2004-2013
- Website: http://blog.watanabepro.co.jp/igarashishunji/

Shunji Igarashi (五十嵐 隼士, Igarashi Shunji; born August 7, 1986) is a Japanese entrepreneur and former actor known for his role as Mirai Hibino/Ultraman Mebius in the 2006-2007 tokusatsu series Ultraman Mebius and several spin-offs in the Ultra Series following that. Igarashi was affiliated with the acting unit D-BOYS, produced by Watanabe Entertainment.

== Career ==
Igarashi started his entertainment career auditioning for D-BOYS in the group's first open audition, held on July 27, 2004. Winner of the Grand Prix second place, Igarashi joined the group shortly after, along with first placer Yuichi Nakamura and third placer Katsuki Nakamura.

In early 2006, Igarashi conquered his first lead role as Mirai Hibino/Ultraman Mebius in the tokusatsu series Ultraman Mebius, the 40th anniversary production in the Ultraman series. He was chosen for the role for being able to convey the part of a "rookie" hero well, being at the time a new actor with little experience in demanding lead roles himself. A fan of the Ultraman series, Igarashi has declared that the desire to play the role of Ultraman was one of the reasons he entered the entertainment world, and that being able to work with the same actors who had played his childhood heroes was one of his highest personal accomplishments. Igarashi was so fond of his work in the series that he eventually incorporated the Möbius strip sign "∞" to his autograph.

With the end of Mebius in March 2007, Igarashi turned his focus to television series and invested on broadening his work. The heroic Mirai of Mebius was followed by diverse characters such as the young psychopath Otoya in the adult drama Watashitachi no Kyokasho, the naive otaku Shinji in the teenage comedy Hana-Kimi and the lively street musician Mitsuru in the late night suspense Shigeshoshi, allowing Igarashi to develop his acting through various genres and different character types.

June 2007 marked Igarashi's theatre debut, guest-starring in the musical D-BOYS STAGE Volume 1: Kanbai Onrei, a D-BOYS project featuring all group members, in the same manner of the 2006 drama/documentary series DD-BOYS. In 2008 he will again guest star in D-BOYS STAGE Volume 2: Last Game. In October 2007 came Igarashi's radio debut with D-RADIO BOYS, another D-BOYS project. Igarashi hosts the weekly show with Shigeshoshi co-star Masato Wada, featuring guest D-BOYS members in each show.

He has also been chosen as a member of D-BOYS special unit D*DATE. After the successful release of D*Date's 2013 single "Glory Days", Igarashi Shunji declared his retirement by the end of November 2013 from the Entertainment Industry in one of the D8Date live performances. At the beginning of November prior Igarashi announcing his retirement, this announcement was officially introduced in the D-Boys official page.

On March 4, 2021 Igarashi has expressed in interest in returning to the entertainment industry.

== Filmography ==
=== Television ===
Title	Character	Year	Network
Ruri no Shima	n/a	2005	NTV
Hatsukare	Tabane	2006	GyaoNet Cinema
DD-BOYS	Himself	2006	TV Asahi
Ultraman Mebius	Mirai Hibino/Ultraman Mebius	2006/2007	TBS
Hanazakari no Kimitachi e	Noe Shinji	2007	Fuji TV
Kuuneru to koro sumu to koro	Keita Aoki	2007	ktv
Watashitachi no Kyokasho	Otoya Ameki	2007	Fuji TV
Shigeshoshi	Mitsuru Natsui	2007	TV Tokyo
Oishii Depachika	Kensaku Kashiwagi	2008	TV Asahi
Isshun no Kaze ni Nare	Kagiyama	2008	Fuji TV
Rookies	Tetsuro Yufune	2008	TBS
Ando Natsu	Kenji	2008	TBS
Giragira	Eagle	2008	TV Asahi
Ninkyo Helper	Kurosawa Goro	2009	Fuji TV
Paradise Kiss Movie	Isabella	2010	
Answer	Hasebe	2012	

=== Cinema ===
Title	Character	Year
Neo Horror Series: Oresama Dai Kouzui	Takumi	2005
Ultraman Mebius & Ultraman Brothers	Mirai Hibino/Ultraman Mebius	2006
Drift 3: Taka	Hayato	2007
Drift 4: Hayato	Hayato	2007
Superior Ultraman 8 Brothers	Mirai Hibino/Ultraman Mebius	2008
Mega Monster Battle: Ultra Galaxy	Mirai Hibino/Ultraman Mebius	2009
Ultraman Zero: The Revenge of Belial	Mirai Hibino/Ultraman Mebius	2010
Paradise Kiss	Daisuke Yamamoto/Isabella Yamamoto	2011

== Other media ==
=== Theatre ===
- Out of Order (2007)
- D-BOYS STAGE Vol.1: Kanbai Onrei (2007)
- D-BOYS STAGE Vol.2: Last Game (2008, in pre-production)

=== Radio ===
- D-RADIO BOYS (2007–2011, Bay FM)

== Promotional media ==
Igarashi has been featured in the following promotional releases:

CDs

- Ultraman Mebius/Run through! -CREW GUYS- - Project DMM with Ultra Bouei-tai (Ultraman Mebius)

Photobooks

- D-BOYS: D-BOYS (2005/04, ISBN 4-924566-42-X)
- D-BOYS: START! (2006/03, ISBN 4-05-403035-1)
- mirai (2006/09, ISBN 4-8470-2962-3) - solo photobook
- Hanazakari no Kimi Tachi e - Ikemen Paradise Making Book (2007/09, ISBN 4-8470-1739-0)
