= Rag Fair =

Japanese male a cappella band

RAG FAIR
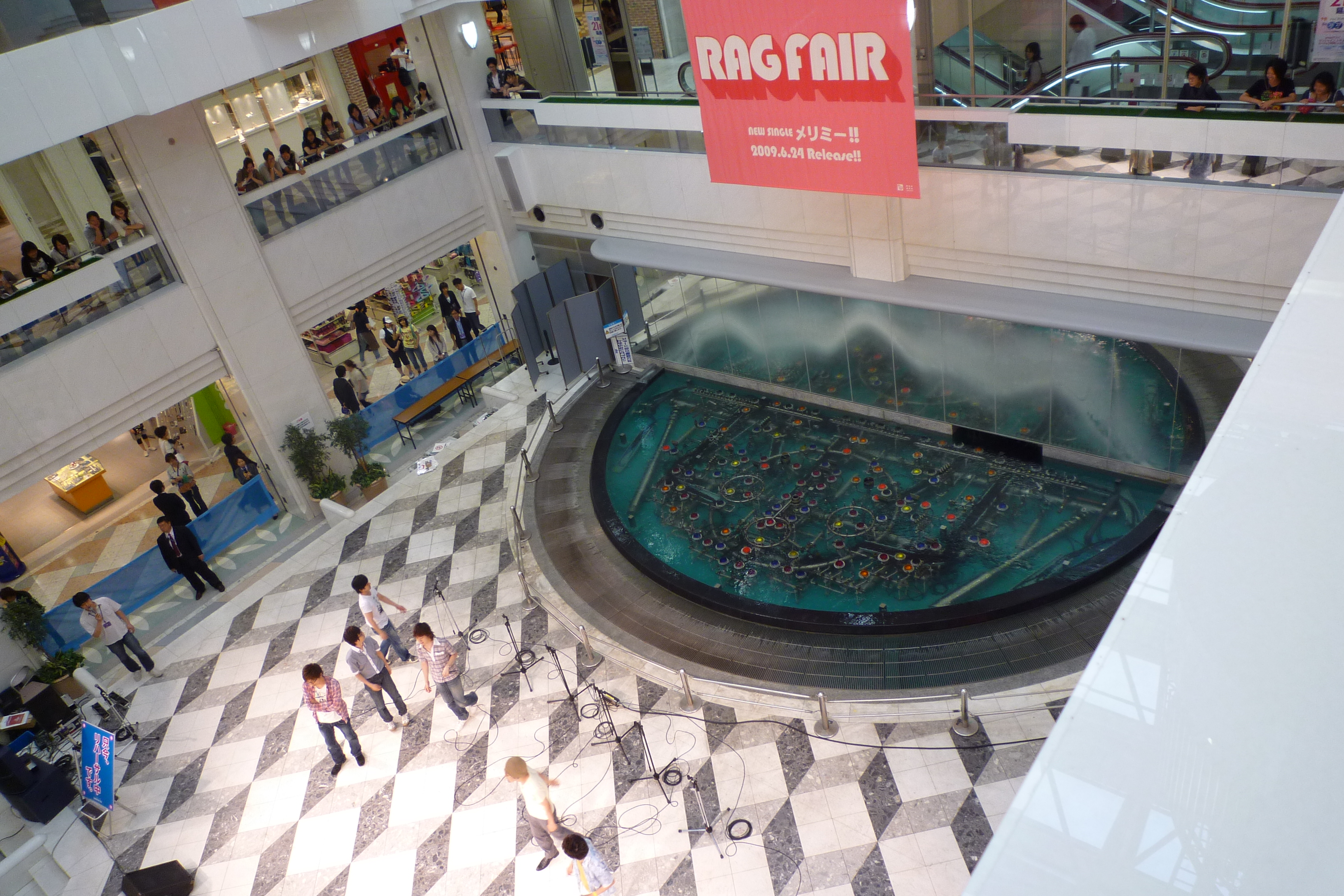
- Rag Fair gets ready to perform at Sunshine City in 2009.

Background information
- Origin: Saitama, Japan
- Genre: a cappella
- Years active: 2002–present
- Label: Oricon
- Members: Reo Tsuchiya; Yosuke Hikichi; Kenichi Arai; Yoshiyuki Kato; Takamasa Kano; Masayoshi Okamura
- Website: http://www.ragfair.jp/index.html

RAG FAIR (ラグフェアー Ragu Feā) is a Japanese male a cappella group. Its current members include Reo Tsuchiya, Yosuke Hikichi, Kenichi Arai, and Yoshiyuki Kato. Former members include Takamasa Kano and Masayoshi Okumura.

== History ==
The band members met each other at Saitama University. An a cappella circle named "chocoletz" (チョコレッツ) was formed in Saitama University in 1997, and RAG FAIR emerged from this in 1999. They developed streetlives in those days around Ōmiya Station and Musashi-Urawa Station.

In 2001, RAG FAIR debuted with album "I RAG YOU."

In 2002, two singles were released simultaneously, "Koi no mileage" (恋のマイレージ) and "She side story" (Sheサイドストーリー). The singles achieved the first and second places, respectively, in the singles' first appearances in the Oricon Weekly Ranking charts. RAG FAIR participated for the first time in the 53rd annual NHK Kouhaku Uta Gassen in 2002, performing "Koi no mileage."

In October 2003, their comedy program "Omatase! RAG Teishoku" (おまたせ！ラグ定食) began airing on Fuji TV. The program ran until March 2004. At the end of the program, the members announced a second "renewal" comedy program, entitled RAG&PEACE. This program ran for another six months in 2004.

A commercial the band shot for McDonald's "Fish Mac Dipper" aired in March 2004. It received the McDonald's Excellent Advertising Award for 2004.

The band performed their first live at the Nippon Budokan publicly on December 10, 2005, and they released the DVD "streetlive! in Budoukan."

In January 2011, RAG FAIR announced that they would take an indefinite dormancy period starting March 2011, concluding their performance career with a live tour named "THAT'S RAG FAIR."

== Discography ==
=== Singles ===
Original Japanese Title	Romanized Name	Translation of Title	Release date
ラブラブなカップル フリフリでチュー	RABU RABU na KAPPURU FURIFURI de CHU-	Couple in Love Kiss Frilly	March 21, 2002
恋のマイレージ	Koi no MAIRE-JI	Love's Mileage	June 19, 2002
She サイド ストーリー	She SAIDO SUTO-RI	She Side Story	June 19, 2002
あさってはSunday	Asatte wa Sunday	The Day after Tomorrow is Sunday	October 23, 2002
空がきれい	Sora ga Kirei	The Sky is Beautiful	January 6, 2003
七転び八起き	Nana Korobi ya Oki	Falling Down Seven Times and Getting Up Eight Times	June 18, 2003
白い天使が降りてくる	Shiroi Tenshi ga Orite Kuru	A White Angel is Coming Down	November 12, 2003
Old Fashioned Love Song			April 21, 2004
HANA		Flower	June 30, 2004
君でなければ	Kimi de Nakereba	If it isn’t You...	September 8, 2004
ハレルヤ	HARERUYA	Hallelujah	February 23, 2005
Summer Smile			July 13, 2005
降りそうな幾億の星の夜	Furisona Ikuoku no Hoshi no Yoru	Many Hundred Million Stars About to Rain In the Night	June 14, 2006
君のために僕が盾になろう	Kimi no Tame ni Boku ga Tate ni Naro	Let Me Become Your Shield For You	September 20, 2006
夏風便り	Natsukazedayori	Summer Wind News	April 18, 2007
赤い糸／LIVEラリー	Akai Ito/LIVE Rarii	A Red Thread/Live Rally	October 3, 2007
早春ラプソディ	Soshun Rapusodi	Early Spring Rhapsody	January 9, 2008
Good Good Day!			October 15, 2008
メリミー！	Merimi-	Marry Me!	June 24, 2009

== Albums ==
- I RAG YOU (December 19, 2001)
- AIR (January 22, 2003)
- PON (July 2, 2003)
- CIRCLE (September 8, 2004)
- RAGood STORY (RAGッ STORY) (November 30, 2005)
- Okurimono (オクリモノ) (October 4, 2006)
- Colours (カラーズ) (January 30, 2008)
- Magical Music Train (August 26, 2009)
- おもたせ (October 15, 2023)
