= Yu Shirota =

Japanese actor and singer (born 1985)

- 城田 優
- Born: December 26, 1985 (age 40); Tokyo, Japan
- Other names: Yu Shirota Fernández; U
- Occupations: Actor; singer
- Years active: 2002–present
- Musical career
- Genres: J-pop
- Years active: 2004–present
- Labels: Watanabe Entertainment (Note: As a member of D-BOYS only.); Avex Trax (2011–present)
- Formerly of: D-BOYS
- Website: yu-shirota.com

Yu Shirota (城田 優, Shirota Yū; born December 26, 1985) is a Japanese actor and singer. Shirota began his acting career in 2002, performing as Tuxedo Mask in the Sailor Moon Musicals and as Kunimitsu Tezuka in Musical: The Prince of Tennis. From 2004 to 2020, he was a member of D-Boys, a male performance troupe by Watanabe Entertainment. He later appeared on television dramas such as Makoto Kagurazaka in Hana-Kimi (2007) and Kei Shinjo in Rookies (2008). In 2009, he was named one of the most promising actors and actresses, placing 8th in a poll conducted by Oricon.

== Early life ==
Shirota was born on December 26, 1985, to a Spanish mother, Pepi (née Fernández) and a Japanese father, Mitsuo Shirota (城田 光男). Shirota lived in Barcelona, Spain from when he was three to about seven years old. He returned to Japan for elementary school and can still speak Spanish in ordinary conversation. He attended high school at Horikoshi High along with NEWS member Tomohisa Yamashita, WaT's Teppei Koike, Japanese actor Toma Ikuta and KAT-TUN's Jin Akanishi and Koki Tanaka.

According to Shirota, when he was little, his family liked to sing songs, so he would borrow his older sister's keyboard, while his mother taught him piano. Thus spawned Shirota's love for composing. He composed his first piece when he was in the fourth grade, titled "The Tear".

== Career ==
Yu Shirota's acting career began from 2003 to 2004, when Shirota became the 7th actor to play Tuxedo Mask in the Sailor Moon Musicals. His first official performance as Tuxedo Mask was on January 2, 2003, in the 2003 Winter Special Mugen Gakuen – Mistress Labyrinth (Kaiteiban). He also demonstrated his ability to play acoustic guitar on stage live, during the Starlights – Ryuusei Densetsu performances. The 2004 New Legend of Kaguya Island was Shirota's last performance as Tuxedo Kamen. That night, on September 5, 2004, after he performed his final rendition of "Prince of Earth", he announced his graduation from the role and received flowers from Kousei Amano who had previously played Tuxedo Mash in the original 1999 Kaguya Island musical. He also began working for a year on the Japanese program, Hanamaru Cafe, as part of the Hanamaru apron team, often leaving set for locations and displaying prizes for viewers during game corners.

During this time, Shirota won the role of Kunimitsu Tezuka, the stoic captain of Seigaku Middle School's tennis club, in the Prince of Tennis musicals series, Tenimyu. From 2005 to 2006, he became the third actor to play Tezuka as a member of the second-generation Seigaku cast. He made his debut as Tezuka on January 8, 2005, in the Side Yamabuki performance in Osaka. That same year, his role as Tezuka was carried into the live adaptation film of the manga and marked his first major film appearance. He also released a Best Actor's album in 2005, for his role as Tezuka. On March 29, 2006, in the Dream Live 3rd Live concert, he along with the majority of the second generation Seigaku cast, graduated from their roles.

Through 2006, Shirota began appearing in a couple dramas and movies including the 2005 Watanabe net drama, Hice Cool, the TV drama special, The Hit Parade, portraying the real-life Mickey Curtis and the June Bride movie in which he played the title character, Natsumi, based on the original manga Jyun Bride by Satoshi Yoshida, resulted in a made for DVD release sequel, Zoku June Bride. In 2007, after nearly a year away from musicals, Shirota returned to stage and starred as Anthony Hope, the cheerful young sailor, in the Japanese stage production of Sweeney Todd. The musical opened on January 5, 2007 and ran through January 29, 2007, at the Nissay Theatre with additional performances during February in Osaka. Shirota then began appearing in a string of dramas, the first being the TV drama, Dignity of Haken, featured Shirota as the half-Spanish Ryuto Amaya, premiered on January 10, 2007, on NTV and ended its run on March 21, 2007. Shirota next appeared in his second TV drama appearance, in the April 2007 drama, Seito Shokun!, which is an adaptation of the manga series, Seito Shokun. He played Ken Mizuhara, a physical education teacher. In his third TV drama role of the year, Shirota appeared in the popular adaptation of Hanazakari No Kimitachi e, which began on July 3, 2007, playing the character of Kagurazaka Makoto, a high-jumping rival to Sano Izumi.

Shirota also appeared in a string of films in 2007. The first being Arakure KNIGHT, the live-action movie adaptation of the 1982 to 1988 manga series, Aratanaru Shobaku by Satosi Yoshida. The film opened in limited release, premiering at Cinema GAGA on April 28, 2007. The second of his three films, Shirota played a main supporting actor in the film adaptation of Gettsu Itaya's semi-autobiographical novel, Waruboro and was released on September 8, 2007, as principal filmography began on September 20, 2006. Before October 2006, Shirota finished filming for his third movie, Heat Island, which was released on October 20, 2007, and is based on the book of the same title written by Kakine Ryuosuke. Shirota played Aki, a street gangster who moves around Shibuya (a district in Tokyo) causing trouble and accidentally obtains a large sum of money that belongs to a crime group; however, the money once belonged to an illegal casino operated by the Yakuza and both groups are after the money.

After Shirota's run as Charles Lindbergh in the 2007 year-end Japanese production of the Take Flight musical, Shirota starred in the January 2008 TV drama, Koshonin – The Negotiator, portraying Mariya Kyousuke, a condemned criminal. Next, Shirota starred in Rookies, the successful baseball drama based on the manga of the same name by Morita Masanori, playing Kei Shinjo. The series first aired on April 19, 2008, and ended July 26, 2008. after 11 episodes. He would reprise his role as Kagurazaka Makoto in the 2008 Hana Kimi special episode. In 2009, Shirota starred in the made-for-television movie, Go Ape, reprised his role as Shinjo Kei in the feature film for Rookies – Sotsugyou, and co-starred with Haruma Miura in Samurai High School as the soft-spoken, Nakamura Tsuyoshi. He also reprised his role as Mariya Kyousuke for the second season of Koshonin – The Negotiator and the 2010 feature film release of Koshonin – The Movie. He is also set to be in the Japanese stage production of Elisabeth as Der Tod from August 2010 to October 2010.

He also played Ryuji Danma in the 2012 live-action version of Great Teacher Onizuka.

Shirota made his solo singing debut as "U" in May 2011 under Avex Trax, releasing his debut triple A-side single, "U/Heart of glass/Sisyphus". His first album is called UNO.

For the Japanese edition of his solo debut album, BACK TO ME, Backstreet Boys member Howie D (aka Howard Dorough) sought out Japanese idol Shirota for one of the bonus tracks, "If I Say" which was digitally released as a single on October 12, 2011.

=== With the D-BOYS ===
Shirota joined the Watanabe Entertainment group, the D-BOYS in October 2004. As a member, he participated in photobook releases, stage performances, radio show hosting, event and meeting greetings, and filming variety shows.

With the D-BoYS, he was featured in their first two photobooks, the self-titled D-Boys and the second called Start. He hosted a radio show called "Marvelous Radio Vibration" with fellow D-BOYS member Kotaro Yanagi and Yukki. The show aired on May 5, 2005, and ended its run on April 1, 2006. The D-BOYS then starred in their own drama documentary variety show called, DD-Boys in which Shirota's appeared in multiple episodes as himself. The show was 23 episodes long and ran from April 10 to September 25, 2006.

In June 2007, the D-BOYS starred in their first musical together called, D-BOYS STAGE, which ran from June 3 to 10 at the Space Zero theater in Tokyo. Shirota appeared in the musical only as a guest performer, making select appearances on June 3, June 8 and 10, due to his busy schedule. The D-BOYS then starred in their 2nd musical, The Last Game to which on June 27, 2008, Shirota announced his graduation during the encore of the play while assuring the media that he would still remain under the Watanabe Entertainment management and still participate in certain D-BOYS projects and events. He officially graduated from the group on July 6, 2008.

Despite having graduated from the D-BOYS, in December 2009, he was featured in both the sixth DVD release of the D-BOYS' Boy Friend series, called YU Channel and their "Kotoshi no Natsu wa Mainichi Dokoka de D-BOYS ☆Uki-uki♪Yatta♪Hohohoy♪" performance events, resulting in appearances in all three Natsu Doko 2009 CD and DVD releases, as well as appearances for promoting their second tour, Fuyu Doko 2009.

== Personal life ==
In April 2006, Shirota experienced language study studying abroad for 1 week in the Australian Gold Coast. His experiences were recorded in the Language Study studying abroad 2007 journal series and covered in detail over 13 pages of his thoughts after the experience and the return home. In June 2006, he then visited New York to see five Broadway musicals: The Producers, Rent, Spelling Bee, Sweeney Todd, and The Phantom of the Opera. Shirota appears regularly in many magazines and journals. In January 2007, Wink up Magazine (Wanibooks) started a monthly column written by Shirota. This column is titled "How are you?" and usually features one picture taken by Shirota.

He, with Hirofumi Araki, also attended the opening night for the Advancement Side Rokkaku feat. Hyotei Gakuen of Tenimyu on August 3, 2006, to support Hiroki Aiba and Kousuke Kujirai.

Shirota has dated "Seventeen" model Keiko Kitagawa and actress Misako Yasuda.

In October 2011, he became an honorary fan of FC Barcelona.

Shirota has an older brother named Jun Shirota, who is also an actor and a singer. His other siblings are Maria, Rina and Dai.

== Selected filmography ==
=== Film ===
Year	Title	Role	Notes	Ref.
2006	Jun Bride	Natsumi	Leading role	
2009	A Good Husband	Ken Nishida		
2012	Arakawa Under the Bridge	Sister		
2013	SPEC: Close	Satoshi Chii		
2015	Akegarasu	Aoi		
2020	The Untold Tale of the Three Kingdoms	Lü Bu		
2021	Remain in Twilight	Matsuoka		
2022	The Confidence Man JP: Episode of the Hero	Gerard González		
2022	Violence Action	Michitaka-kun		
2025	Salary Man Kintaro	Takatsukasa		
2025	Salary Man Kintaro 2	Takatsukasa		
2026	Angel Flight: The Movie	Shusuke Hiiragi		

=== Television ===
Year	Title	Role	Notes	Ref.
2008	Rookies	Kei Shinjo		
2009	Tenchijin	Sanada Yukimura	Taiga drama	
2011	Arakawa Under the Bridge	Sister		
2021	Komi Can't Communicate	Shisuto Naruse		
2021–22	Come Come Everybody	Narrator	Asadora	
2023	What Will You Do, Ieyasu?	Mori Nagayoshi	Taiga drama	
2023	Angel Flight	Shusuke Hiiragi		
2025	1972: Nagisa no Keika	Jack Shinsuke Ikezawa	Miniseries	
2026	Plastic Beauty			

=== Video games ===
Year	Title	Role	Notes	Ref.
2027	Stranger Than Heaven	Makoto Daito		

=== Japanese dub ===
Year	Title	Role	Notes	Ref.
2020	Onward	Barley Lightfoot		

=== Music videos ===
Year	Title	Artist	Notes	Ref.
2006	Kimi no Tame ni Boku ga Tate ni Naro	Rag Fair		

== Stage ==
- March 22 and 23, 2007, as a guest performer in the Out of Order Live Entertainment Show

Japanese Original Musicals/Plays

SERAMYU: Sailor Moon Musical Series (as Chiba Mamoru / Tuxedo Kamen)

- Musical Bishoujo Senshi Sailor Moon Aki no Fan Kansha Event (2002)
- Winter Special Musical Bishoujo Senshi Sailor Moon Mugen Gakuen – Mistress Labyrinth (Kaiteiban) (2003)
- Musical Bishoujo Senshi Sailor Moon GW Fan Kansha Event (2003)
- Summer Special Musical Bishoujo Senshi Sailor Moon Starlights * Ryuusei Densetsu (2003)
- Musical Bishoujo Senshi Sailor Moon Aki no Fan Kansha Event (2003)
- Winter Special Musical Bishoujo Senshi Sailor Moon Kakyuu-Ouhi Kourin THE SECOND STAGE FINAL (2004)
- Summer Special Musical Bishoujo Senshi Sailor Moon Shin – Kaguya Shima Densetsu Golden Week Fan Kansha Event (2004)
- Summer Special Musical Bishoujo Senshi Sailor Moon Shin – Kaguya Shima Densetsu NEW LEGEND OF KAGUYA ISLAND (2004)

TENIMYU: The Prince of Tennis Musical Series (as Kunimitsu Tezuka)

- The Prince of Tennis Musical: Side Yamabuki feat. St Rudolph (In Winter of 2004–2005)
- The Prince of Tennis Musical: Dream Live 2nd (2005)
- The Prince of Tennis Musical: The Imperial Match Hyotei Gakuen (In Winter of 2005–2006)
- The Prince of Tennis Musical: The Imperial Match Hyotei Gakuen in Winter (2006)
- The Prince of Tennis Musical: Dream Live 3rd (2006)
- The Prince of Tennis Musical: Dream Live 7th (2010, guest appearance)

D-BOYS STAGE Series

- vol. 1 Sold-out Thanks – Nagatsuka Saburo (on June 6 and 9, 2007)
- vol. 2 The Last Game – Aimoto Shinichiro (June to July 2008)

Earth Gorgeous Produce Series

- vol. 14 The Love Bugs – Thinklemans (2016.1.9~2.24 TBS Akasaka ACT Theater, 3.1~3.3 Aichi Arts Center, 3.11~3.13 Fukuwoka Sun Palace, 3.19~3.29 Festival Hall)

European and American Musicals/Plays under Japanese Production

Sweeney Todd the Musical: The Demon Barber of Fleet Street – Anthony Hope (January 5 to 29, 2007)

Take Flight the Musical – Charles Lindbergh (2007.11.24~12.9 Tokyo International Forum Hall C, 12.14~12.16 Kita-kyushu Art Theater, 12.19~12.21 Chunichi Theater, 2008.1.3~1.5 Umeda Art Theater)

Elisabeth Das Musical – Der Tod

- Triple Cast with Yamaguchi Yuichiro, Ishimaru Kanji (2010.8.9~10.30 Imperial Theater)
- Double Cast with Inoue Yoshio (2015.6.11~8.26 Imperial Theater)
- Double Cast with Inoue Yoshio (2016.6.28~7.26 Imperial Theater, 8.6~9.4 Hakataza Theater, 9.11~9.30 Umeda Art Theater MainHall, 10.8~10.23 Chunichi Theater)

Roméo et Juliette -

- as Romeo, Double Cast with Yamazaki Ikusaburo (2011.9.7~10.2 TBS Akasaka ACT Theater, 10.8~10.20 Umeda Art Theater MainHall)
- as Romeo, with other 2 actors understudy / Tybalt (2013.9.3~10.5 Tokyu Theater Orb, 10.12~10.27 Umeda Art Theater MainHall)

Phantom the Musical – Phantom/Eric (2014.9.13~9.29 TBS Akasaka ACT Theater, 10.5~10.15 Umeda Art Theater MainHall)

Miss Julie the Straight Play – Jean (2017.3.10~4.1 Bunkamura Theater Cocoon)

Bullets over Broadway the Musical – Cheech (2018.2.7~2.28 Nissay Theater, 3.5~3.20 Umeda Art Theater MainHall, 3.24~4.1 Hakataza Theater)

Kinky Boots – Lola (Spring till Summer 2022 at New National Theatre in Tokyo, the Orix Theater in Osaka and the Tokyu Theatre Orb in Shibuya)

Dance of the Vampires – Graf von Krolock (Spring till Summer 2025 at New National Theatre in Tokyo, the Orix Theater in Osaka and the Tokyu Theatre Orb in Shibuya)

== Live & Concert ==
Live

- U 1st LIVE (2011.12.17 Umeda Art Theater Dramacity, 12.25~12.26 Tokyo Akasaka BLITZ)
- Love & Peace Tour 2012 (2012.3.2 Tokyo SHIBUYA-AX, 2012.3.4 Nagoya Diamond Hall, 2012.3.9 Osaka Morinomiya Piloti Hall)
- YU SHIROTA LIVE 2012「Segundo」 (2012.12.21~12.22 Tokyo Akasaka BLITZ, 2012.12.26 Osaka Namba Hatch)

Concert

- 「Meet in Beijing Arts Festival(12th)」Shirota Yu Concert (2012.5.9 Beijing Haidian Theater)
- 「4Stars One World Broadway Musicals」Concert (2013.6.15~6.23 Aoyama Theater, 6.27~6.30 Umeda Art Theater Main Hall)

*** The other three performers are Ramin Karimloo, Sierra Boggess and Lea Salonga. ***

- Yu & Musical Lovers 2013 (2013.12.26~12.27 Tokyo Nihonbashi Mitsui Hall)
- Umeda Art Theater 10th Anniversary Concert「Golden Songs」(2015.2.19 Tokyo International Forum Hall C) – Guest performer
- Iwatani Tokiko Memorial Concert (2015.10.1 Nakano Sun Plaza Hall)
- Friends of Disney Concert 2016 (2016.4.9 Tokyo International Forum Hall A)
- Iwatani Tokiko Memorial Concert－Forever－Vol.2 (2017.11.7 Nakano Sun Plaza Hall)
- 4Stars 2017 Concert (2017.12.14~12.17 Umeda Art Theater Main Hall, 12.20~12.28 Tokyo International Forum Hall C)

*** The other three performers are Ramin Karimloo, Sierra Boggess and Cynthia Erivo. ***

== Discography ==
Shirota has currently released two solo EP albums with Avex Trax, one solo album for the Prince of Tennis musical and three with the D-BOYS in Japan (JPN), only.

Year	Cover	Info	Chart positions	Track Listings
Year	Cover	Info	JPN	Track Listings
2005		Musical Tennis no Ohjisama (The Prince of Tennis); Imperial Match Hyotei Gakuen Best Actor's Series 001; Yu Shirota as Kunimitsu Tezuka: Release date: December 19, 2005; 1st Studio album; Formats: CD	N/A	1. "Owarinaki Stage"; 2. "Ashita Fuku Kaze"; 3. "Tachitsukusu Kanata"; 4. "Instrumental – Tezuka vs Inui"; 5. "Yudan Sezu ni Ikou – Kunimitsu Solo Edition"; 6. "Instrumental – Kikumaru/Momoshiro vs Oshitari/Mukahi"; 7. "Semero, Tsuyoku Nare"; 8. "Instrumental – Fuji vs Akutagawa"; 9. "Omae wa Seigaku no Hashira ni Nare – Kunimitsu Solo Edition"; 10. "Yuu Shirota Message for you"
2011		U: Release date: May 4, 2011; 1st Extended play album; Formats: CD	17	1. "Sisyphus"; 2. "U"; 3. "Heart of Glass"; 4. "Ama Se Cuando"; 5. "Instrumental – Sisyphus"; 6. "Instrumental – U"; 7. "Instrumental – Heart of Glass"
2011		Setsuna ~ A Sandglass of Fate (Type C): Release date: September 7, 2011; 2nd Extended play album; Formats: CD	43	1. "Setsuna ~ A Sandglass of Fate"; 2. "La Flor Abandonada"; 3. "Love & Peace"; 4. "Instrumental – Setsuna ~ A Sandglass of Fate"; 5. "Instrumental – La Flor Abandonada"; 6. "Instrumental – Love & Peace"

Year	Title	CD Info	Track List
2003	Seramyu – Starlights – Ryuusei Densetsu	OST of the Musical as Tuxedo Kamen	Kaze no Shijin; Prince of the Earth; Get Across the Moon; What For!? Shinjitsu no Kajitsu
2004	Seramyu – New Legend of Kaguya Island	OST of the Musical as Tuxedo Kamen	Dark Menorah; Moonlight Justice; What is a Mother?; And Believe in All (2004 summers Ver.); Everyone is Loved by Someone
2004	Seramyu – Marinamoon Special Edition	OST of the Musical as Tuxedo Kamen	Moonlight Justice
2005	Tenimyu – Side Yamabuki Feat. St. Rudolph Gakuen in Winter	OST of the Musical as Kunimitsu Tezuka	Track List
2005	Tenimyu – Dream Live 2nd	OST of the Musical as Kunimitsu Tezuka	Track List
2005	Tenimyu – The Imperial Match Hyoutei Gakuen	OST of the Musical as Kunimitsu Tezuka	Track List
2006	Tenimyu – Dream Live 3rd	OST of the Musical as Kunimitsu Tezuka	Track List
2006	Musical Tennis no Ohjisama Complete CD Box	OST of the Musical as Kunimitsu Tezuka	Track List

== Official DVDs ==
On November 16, 2005, Shirota released an Idol DVD called With U. The DVD includes an acoustic performance for the song "Natsu no Owari ~ Mou Kako no Koi", for which he had composed and written lyrics. Despite having graduated from the D-BOYS, in December 2009, he was featured in both the sixth DVD release of the D-BOYS' Boy Friend series, called YU Channel and their "Kotoshi no Natsu wa Mainichi Dokoka de D-BOYS Ukiuki Yatta Hohhohoi" event, resulting in appearances in all three Natsu Doko CD and DVD releases.

Year	Series	DVD title	DVD cover	DVD Info	Release date	Label / Distributor
2005	Men's DVD Series	With U		First Solo DVD	November 16, 2005	MMV
2009	Natsu Doko 2009	Natsu Doko 2009 Kaze – Team Wind version		Memorial Footage	December 16, 2009	SonyMusic
2009	Natsu Doko 2009	Natsu Doko 2009 Yama – Team Mountain version		Memorial Footage	December 16, 2009	SonyMusic
2009	Natsu Doko 2009	Natsu Doko 2009 Kawa – Team River version		Memorial Footage	December 16, 2009	SonyMusic
2009	D-BOYS Boy Friend Series	YU Channel		Vol 6.	December 23, 2009	Geneon

== Bibliography ==
Besides appearing in the first two photobooks with the D-BOYS, on September 26, 2007, he released his first solo photobook collection. This included childhood pictures of him as well as photos taken by Shirota himself.

Year	Photobook Title	Description	Release date	Publisher	ISBN
2005	D-BOYS	D-BOYS First Photobook	April 27, 2005	Tokyo News Agency	ISBN 4-924566-42-X
2006	START	D-BOYS Second Photobook	March 15, 2006	Gakken Co., Ltd.	ISBN 4-05-403035-1
2007	Yu Shirota	Yu Shirota First Solo Photobook	September 26, 2007	Wani Books Co., Ltd.	ISBN 978-4-8470-4020-7
2009	Rookies – Sotsugyo – Perfect Book	Rookies Cast Photobook	May 28, 2009	Shueisha Publishing Co., Ltd.	
2009	Sugao	Yu Shirota Second Solo Photobook	June 27, 2009	Kodansha, Ltd.	ISBN 978-4-06-353711-6

== See also ==
- D-Boys
- Tenimyu
- The Prince of Tennis Movie
- The Prince of Tennis
- Kunimitsu Tezuka
- Sailor Moon musicals
- Tuxedo Kamen

== Notes ==
Preceded by Kenji Urai	Mamoru Chiba/Tuxedo Mask in the Sailor Moon Musicals; 2003–2004	Succeeded by Gyo Miyamoto
Preceded by Eiji Takigawa	Kunimitsu Tezuka in the Prince of Tennis Musicals; 2005–2006	Succeeded by Keisuke Minami
