= Takumi-kun =

Novel series by Shinobu Gotō

- Cover of the first volume, Soshite Harukaze ni Sasayaite (1992)
- See below
- Author: Shinobu Gotoh
- Original title: タクミくん
- Cover artist: Kazumi Ohya
- Country: Japan
- Language: Japanese
- Genre: Boys' love
- Publisher: Kadokawa Shoten
- Published: April 23, 1992 – February 1, 2014
- Media type: Print (paperback); Audio drama; E-book
- No. of books: 28

The Takumi-kun series (Japanese: タクミくんシリーズ, Hepburn: Takumi-kun shirīzu) is a novel series written by Shinobu Gotoh. The series was published from 1992 to 2014 by Kadokawa Shoten, spanning 28 volumes in total.

The novel was adapted into two manga series in the boys' love manga magazine Ciel: a 1998 adaptation by Billy Takahashi, and a second adaptation by the novel's original illustrator, Kazumi Ohya, that ran from 2000 to 2008. The novels were also adapted into several live-action films.

== Plot ==
Takumi Hayama is a high school student at Shidō Academy, a private elite boarding school in the mountains. Unlike the other students, Takumi is not from a prestigious background and attends the school to escape from a past psychological trauma that leaves him repulsed by people touching him, and as a result, he is perceived as emotionless and unsociable by his classmates. The only person who doesn't see him as such, besides his roommate, is Giichi "Gui" Saki, is a popular, attractive boy who has returned from the United States. As Takumi and Gui begin their second year at the school, one day, Gui surprises Takumi by confessing that he has been in love with him for some time. As Takumi learns more about Gui, he also must learn to overcome his past and rivals who threaten to break up their newfound relationship.

== Characters ==
Takumi Hayama (葉山 託生, Hayama Takumi)
Voiced by: Yasunori Matsumoto (drama cassette book), Katsumi Toriumi (drama CD vols. 1-6), Makoto Aoki (drama CD vols. 7-8), Soichiro Hoshi (drama CD vols. 9-10), Showtaro Morikubo (Ruby ni Kuchizuke radio show), Shinnosuke Tachibana (novel omnibus drama CD)
Takumi is a second-year student. He is seen by his classmates as unapproachable and unsociable due to his indifferent nature. However, Takumi fears getting close to other people after his family blamed him for making advances on his older brother, when in reality, his brother had been grooming and sexually abusing him since elementary school. After meeting Gui, Takumi confronts his past and open towards other people.
Giichi Saki (崎 義一, Saki Giichi)
Voiced by: Kazuhiko Inoue (drama cassette book & drama CD vols. 1-6, 9, 10), Ryotaro Okiayu (drama CD vols. 7-8), Toshihiko Seki (Ruby ni Kuchizuke radio show), Toshiyuki Morikawa (novel omnibus drama CD)
Nicknamed Gui (ギイ, Gī), he is Takumi's classmate. Gui is a quarter-French and spent his childhood growing up in the United States. Gui is one of the most popular boys in school due to his friendly nature and unique beauty.
Shōzō Akaike (赤池 章三, Akaike Shōzō)
Akaike is Gui's friend and part of the student discipline committee. The student body is intimidated by him, and he initially antagonizes Takumi at first due to Takumi not taking Gui's feelings seriously. Since his mother died when he was young, he grew up doing household chores for his father. He is the only character in the series who identifies as straight and his childhood friend Mamiko is in love with him.
Arata Misu (三洲 新, Misu Arata)
Misu is a popular student, but is overwhelmed by his popularity that it causes him to be stressed, which he often takes out on Shingyōji. The two eventually date.
Kanemitsu Shingyōji (真行寺 兼満, Shingyōji Kanemitsu)
Shingyōji is a calm boy from the kendo club.
Toshihisa Katakura (片倉 利久, Katakura Toshihisa)
Toshihisa was Takumi's roommate during their first year.
Masashi Iwashita (岩下 政史, Iwashita Masashi)
Iwashita is Toshihisa's new roommate beginning their second year, and they eventually begin dating.
Izumi Takabayashi (高林 泉, Takabayashi Izumi)
Izumi is Shidō Academy's "princess", known for his androgynous good looks and spoiled behavior. He is in love with Gui and targets Takumi after discovering Gui's feelings for him. Eventually, he comes to accept Yoshizawa's feelings for him instead.
Michio Yoshizawa (吉沢 道雄, Yoshizawa Michio)
Yoshizawa is Izumi's good-natured roommate, who is in love with him.
Masaki Yagura (矢倉 柾木, Yagura Masaki)
Yagura is a student who fell in love with Yatsu during their school entrance exams.
Hiromi Yatsu (八津 宏海, Yatsu Hiromi)
Yatsu is a popular student and is slow to trust others after being betrayed. He eventually begins dating Yagura.
Masataka Nozawa (野沢 政貴, Nozawa Masataka)
Nozawa is a gentle boy who is unable to refuse requests.
Eiji Komazawa (駒沢 瑛二, Komazawa Eiji)
Komazawa falls in love with Nozawa during their first year.

== Media ==
=== Novels ===
Shinobu Gotoh published the Takumi-kun series from 1992 to 2014, which were published by Kadokawa Shoten under the Kadokawa Ruby Bunko imprint. The novels were all illustrated by Kazumi Ohya.

==== Volumes ====
No.	Title	Japanese release date	Japanese ISBN
1	Soshite Harukaze ni Sasayaite (そして春風にささやいて)	April 23, 1992	978-4044336011
2	Cauliflower Dream (カリフラワードリーム)	July 27, 1992	978-4044336028
3	Canon (CANON -カノン-)	December 1, 1992	978-4044336035
4	Farewell (FAREWELL -フェアウェル-)	January 29, 1993	978-4044336042
5	Niji-iro no Glass (虹色の硝子)	November 30, 1993	978-4044336066
6	Koibumi (恋文)	March 31, 1994	978-4044336073
7	Tōri Sugita Kisetsu (通り過ぎた季節)	November 29, 1994	978-4044336097
8	Opening wa Sawayaka ni (オープニングは華やかに)	June 29, 1995	978-4044336103
9	Sincerely... (Sincerely... -シンシアリ-)	November 28, 1995	978-4044336110
10	Valentine Rhapsody (バレンタインラプソディ)	November 26, 1996	978-4044336127
11	Ano, Hareta Aozora (あの、晴れた青空)	November 20, 1997	978-4047001985
12	Bibō no Detail (美貌のディテイル)	November 28, 1997	978-4044336134
13	Midori no Yubisaki (緑のゆびさき)	December 25, 1998	978-4044336158
14	Hana Chiru Yori ni Kimi o Omoeba (花散る夜にきみを想えば)	December 25, 1999	978-4044336165
15	Kare to Tsuki no Kyori (彼と月との距離)	December 25, 2000	978-4044336172
16	Pure (Pure -ピュア-)	November 30, 2001	978-4044336189
17	Fairytale: Otogi Banashi (フェアリーテイル おとぎ話)	November 30, 2002	978-4044336196
18	Natsu no Zanzō (夏の残像)	April 28, 2004	978-4044336219
19	Kakusareta Niwa: Natsu no Zanzō 2 (隠された庭 -夏の残像・2-)	November 30, 2004	978-4044336226
20	Akatsuki o Matsu Made (暁を待つまで)	August 31, 2006; April 28, 2010 (re-release)	978-4041010723; ISBN 978-4044336288 (re-release)
21	Bara no Shita de: Natsu no Zanzō 3 (薔薇の下で -夏の残像・3-)	November 30, 2006	978-4044336233
22	Koi no Kakera: Natsu no Zanzō 4 (恋のカケラ -夏の残像・4-)	November 30, 2007	978-4044336240
23	Prologue (プロローグ)	April 26, 2008	978-4044336257
24	Yūwaku (誘惑)	November 29, 2008	978-4044336264
25	Dareka ga Kare ni Koishiteru (誰かが彼に恋してる)	November 28, 2009	978-4044336271
26	Risk (リスク)	August 31, 2010	978-4044336295
27	Kaze to Hikari to Tsuki to Inu (風と光と月と犬)	August 31, 2011	978-4048742382
28	Station	February 1, 2014 (special booklet bundle); March 1, 2014 (regular edition)	978-4041010723 (special booklet bundle); ISBN 978-4041012383 (regular edition)

==== Omnibus ====
In 2016, Kadokawa published omnibus editions of all the novels in kanzenban format, which also included new unpublished stories. The 11th volume of the omnibus edition came with a drama CD.

No.	Title	Japanese release date	Japanese ISBN
1	Takumi-kun Series: Kanzen-ban 1 (タクミくんシリーズ 完全版 (1))	February 27, 2016	978-4041039458
2	Takumi-kun Series: Kanzen-ban 2 (タクミくんシリーズ 完全版 (2))	March 31, 2016	978-4041039502
3	Takumi-kun Series: Kanzen-ban 3 (タクミくんシリーズ 完全版 (3))	April 28, 2016	978-4041043028
4	Takumi-kun Series: Kanzen-ban 4 (タクミくんシリーズ 完全版 (4))	May 31, 2016	978-4041043059
5	Takumi-kun Series: Kanzen-ban 5 (タクミくんシリーズ 完全版 (5))	June 30, 2016	978-4041043066
6	Takumi-kun Series: Kanzen-ban 6 (タクミくんシリーズ 完全版 (6))	July 30, 2016	978-4041043073
7	Takumi-kun Series: Kanzen-ban 7 (タクミくんシリーズ 完全版 (7))	August 31, 2016	978-4041043080
8	Takumi-kun Series: Kanzen-ban 8 (タクミくんシリーズ 完全版 (8))	October 1, 2016	978-4041047200
9	Takumi-kun Series: Kanzen-ban 9 (タクミくんシリーズ 完全版 (9))	November 1, 2016	978-4041047187
10	Takumi-kun Series: Kanzen-ban 10 (タクミくんシリーズ 完全版 (10))	December 1, 2016	978-4041047194
11	Takumi-kun Series: Kanzen-ban 11 (タクミくんシリーズ 完全版 (11))	February 1, 2017	978-4041049457 (regular edition); ISBN 978-4041049464 (limited edition drama CD bundle)

=== Manga ===
Several manga adaptations have been serialized in the magazine Ciel. The first manga series, which adapted the novel Soshite Harukaze ni Sasayaite, was illustrated by Billy Takahashi and published in August 1998. The manga adaptations were then subsequently illustrated by Kazumi Ohya, the original illustrator for the novels, which were published under the Asuka Comics CL-DX imprint. The first three volumes of Ohya's manga adaptation were licensed for English distribution by Tokyopop under their Blu imprint.

No.	Title	Original release date	English release date
—	Soshite Harukaze ni Sasayaite (そして春風にささやいて)	August 28, 1998; 978-4048529921	—
1	Takumi-kun series vol. 1 June Pride; Takumi-kun shirīzu: June Pride Roku-gatsu no Jisonshin (タクミくんシリーズ June Pride 6月の自尊心)	February 1, 2001; 978-4048533256	September 11, 2007; 978-1427802804
2	Takumi-kun series vol. 2 Barefoot Waltz; Takumi-kun shirīzu: Hadashi no Warutsu (タクミくんシリーズ 裸足のワルツ)	February 1, 2002; 978-4048534727	December 11, 2007; 978-1427804334
3	Takumi-kun series vol. 3 Tales Out of Season; Takumi-kun shirīzu: Kisetsu Hazure no Kaidan (タクミくんシリーズ 季節はずれのカイダン)	December 1, 2003; 978-4048537001	April 8, 2008; 978-1427806130
4	Takumi-kun shirīzu: Bibō no Diteiru (タクミくんシリーズ 美貌のディテイル)	November 29, 2004; 978-4048537858	—
5	Takumi-kun shirīzu: Jealousy (タクミくんシリーズ jealousy)	November 29, 2005; 978-4048541428	—
6	Takumi-kun shirīzu: Hana Chiru Yoru ni Kimi o Omoeba (タクミくんシリーズ 花散る夜にきみを想えば)	November 28, 2006; 978-4048540605	—
7	Takumi-kun shirīzu: Pure (タクミくんシリーズ Pure)	November 29, 2007; 978-4048541428	—
8	Takumi-kun shirīzu: Pure 2 (タクミくんシリーズ Pure 2)	November 28, 2008; 978-4048542692	—

=== Films ===
In 2007, Soshite Harukaze ni Sasayaite was adapted into a live-action film, starring Tomo Yanagishita as Takumi and Keisuke Katō as Gui. Following the film's release, four more adaptations were produced, with Kyousuke Hamao as Takumi and Daisuke Watanabe as Gui. After the release of the fifth film, Ano, Hareta Aozora, Hamao and Watanabe announced they were leaving the project and would not be reprising their roles for any future sequels.

In January 2023, a new film adaptation titled Takumi-kun Series: Nagai Nagai Monogatari no Hajimari no Asa was announced for release later in the year to celebrate the 30th anniversary of the series.

1. Takumi-kun Series: Soshite Harukaze ni Sasayaite (2007)
2. Takumi-kun Series: Niji-iro no Glass (2009)
3. Takumi-kun Series: Bibō no Detail (2010)
4. Takumi-kun Series: Pure (2010)
5. Takumi-kun Series: Ano, Hareta Aozora (2011)
6. Takumi-kun Series: Nagai Nagai Monogatari no Hajimari no Asa (2023)

=== Stage play ===
A stage play adaptation of Soshite Harukaze ni Sasayaite ran in December 2009. The DVD was released on April 16, 2010.

== Reception ==
The novel series was successful during its run, becoming one of the most popular boys' love novels. In 2007, the novel series had sold a cumulative total of 4 million copies. By 2016, the novels had sold a cumulative total of 5 million copies.
