= Kōji Seto =

Japanese actor and singer (born 1988)

Koji Seto
- 瀬戸 康史
- Born: May 18, 1988 (age 38); Kama, Fukuoka, Japan
- Occupations: Actor; singer
- Years active: 2005–present
- Agent: Watanabe Entertainment
- Spouse: Mizuki Yamamoto (m. 2020)
- Children: 1
- Relatives: Saori Seto (sister); Shuto Miyazaki (brother-in-law)
- Website: Official website

Kōji Seto (瀬戸 康史, Seto Kōji; born May 18, 1988) is a Japanese actor and singer associated with D-Boys, an acting troupe produced by Watanabe Entertainment. His major works include lead roles as Wataru Kurenai in Kamen Rider Kiva; and supporting roles as Satoru Okura in Atashinchi no Danshi, Ariake Yamato in Otomen, and Eiji Kikumaru in Musical: The Prince of Tennis. He starred as Mori Ranmaru in the drama, Gō: Hime-tachi no Sengoku.

In 2010, he was named one of the most promising actors and actresses, placing 7th in a poll conducted by Oricon. Through his role with Kamen Rider Kiva, he was also the lead vocalist of their promotional rock band Tetra-Fang.

== Life and career ==
Born in 1988 in Kyushu, Kōji Seto grew up as the oldest child with two younger sisters. His childhood dream of becoming a vet changed suddenly with the end of his Junior High School time, when he watched with 15 years the TV series Orange Days. The praised drama and performance by Satoshi Tsumabuki inspired his wish to become an actor. After discussing his plans with his parents, they decided to support their son and enrolled him to a local acting school.

After one year in training, he was cast in 2005 as Makoto Kanno in the television series Rocket Boys. After the filming ended, he was accepted final round of Watanabe Entertainment's 2nd official D-Boys audition. With his interpretation of Masaharu Fukuyama's song "Himawari" won Seto the Grand Prix 2nd Winner Award on July 31, 2005. He debuted as a Junior member just shortly afterwards in December at the 3rd D-Live Event - an entertainment show featuring only D-Boys members.

In spring 2006, at the age of 17, he finally moved after constant commuting from his rural and idyllic hometown in Fukuoka to live by himself in Tokyo. Seto starred together with all his fellow D-Boys members in their first own TV production "DD-Boys" and won, at the same time, the audition for Eiji Kikumaru in Musical: The Prince of Tennis and played him until September 9, 2007. He and his stage partner Yukihiro Takiguchi were honored with a Best Actors Album and praised by the creator of the original work Takeshi Konomi as perfect cast.

Seto's official D-Boys logo is a chameleon, in reference to his versatility. In late 2006 he was chosen as Thursday's-face of Oha Suta, a children's TV show airing live every morning on TV Tokyo. He co-hosted the show constantly from then, once a week together with Kōichi Yamadera, until his graduation on April 28, 2008. He starred in his first leading part in spring 2007 as Kyoichi Segawa in Happy Boys. Right after this series, he played Tibe-kun in the live-action film adaptation of Tonari no Yaoi-chan.

The part of Izamu Hayama in the feature film Tenshi ga Kureta Mono was his first cinema production in autumn 2007. He then co-starred in winter 2007 with Aya Ueto and Yo Oizumi in his first Golden Time TV series Abarenbo Mama as a kindergarten teacher. From January 2008 to 2009 he starred as one of Toei's Tokusatsu Heros, the young violinist and half-vampire Wataru Kurenai, the protagonist in Kamen Rider Kiva. About the same time, was Seto chosen among 1000 competitors in an audition for the leading part as the rebel Hiroki "Hiro" Sakurai, in the TV series adaption of Koizora (after the bestseller book by Mika), making him the leading actor for two TV series filmed and broadcast at the same time. Both works earned him a nomination for the renowned Elan d'Or award as Best Newcomer of the Year 2009.

In early 2009, Seto started filming for the latest Ju-On movie Ju-On - Black Girl. He reprised his role as Wataru Kurenai for the first and last episode of Kamen Rider Decade, as well as in Decade: Last Story, the last part of the storyline, as a guest star. Afterwards, he starred as the hotheaded genius-magician Satoru Okura in the Fuji TV drama Atashinchi no Danshi as one of Maki Horikita's six sons, followed by his part as the cheerful, but delusional junior Ariake Yamato in the drama adaption of the Hit-Manga Otomen in Summer. At the end of October, he finished filming with Yusuke Yamamoto for their roles as brothers (having previously starred as brothers in Atashinchi no Danshi) in the award-winning TV movie Rinne no Ame, in which Seto portrayed the mentally disabled, autistic Shuhei Mikami.

In early 2010, he played Shunta Matsumoto, a young medical student in the BeeTV drama Gift, a part that was written for him, as an alternative version of himself. In the spring TBS TV series Tumbling, Seto is starring as Yuta Takenaka, captain to the boy's rhythmic gymnastics team at Karasumori High, alongside Yusuke Yamamoto again. For the 10th anniversary commemoration of Watanabe Entertainment, he was selected with fellow D-Boys members Shunji Igarashi, Yuichi Nakamura, and Hirofumi Araki to represent all members of the group in a special unit with a new fifth member determined through the 2010 D-Boys Audition. Recently, he's been filming and played as Mori Ranmaru for the latest Taiga drama Gō for 2011.

== Personal life ==
On 7 August 2020, Seto married his costar in TV dramas Hope: Kitai Zero no Shinnyu Shain and Perfect World, Mizuki Yamamoto.

On 29 January 2022, his wife, Yamamoto, made the announcement that she was expecting their first child. The couple's first child was born on 16 May 2023.

== Filmography ==
=== Film ===
Year	Title	Role	Notes	Ref.
2008	Kamen Rider Kiva: King of the Castle in the Demon World	Wataru Kurenai / Kiva(Lead)	Motion picture	
2011	Runway Beat	Biito "Beat" Mizorogi	Lead role	
2014	Haganai	Kodaka Hasegawa	Lead role	
2018	Asako I & II	Kushihashi		
2019	No Longer Human	Harube Ima		
2021	Daughter of Lupin the Movie	Kazuma Sakuraba		
2022	The Confidence Man JP: Episode of the Hero	Marcel Marimura		
2022	Love Nonetheless	Kōji Tada	Lead role	
2023	Maboroshi	Akimune Kikuiri (voice)		
2023	Fly Me to the Saitama: From Biwa Lake with Love	Kenta Wakatsuki		
2024	Worlds Apart	Shingo Kasamachi		
2024	All About Suomi	Morio Koiso		
2025	Dollhouse	Tadahiko		
2026	Samurai Vengeance	Ippachi		

=== Television ===
Year	Title	Role	Notes	Ref.
2008	Kamen Rider Kiva	Wataru Kurenai / Kiva	Lead role	
2011	Gō	Mori Ranmaru	Taiga drama	
2015	Burning Flower	Yoshida Toshimaro	Taiga drama	
2016	Hope: Kitai Zero no Shinnyu Shain	Shinji Kiriake		
2018	Princess Jellyfish	Kuranosuke Koibuchi		
2019	Daughter of Lupin	Kazuma Sakuraba		
2019	Perfect World	Hirotaka Koreeda		
2022	The 13 Lords of the Shogun	Hōjō Tokifusa	Taiga drama	
2026	Grass for My Pillow	Minoru Kuwano	Television film	

== Discography ==
Year	Title	CD details	Track list
2006	Tenimyu - Advancement Match Rokkaku feat. Hyotei Gakuen	OST of the Musical as Eiji Kikumaru	Track list
2006	Tenimyu - Absolute King Rikkai feat. Rokkaku: First Service	OST of the Musical as Eiji Kikumaru	Track list
2007	Happy Boys Image Collection 1: Yasashisa	Single as Kyoichi Segawa	Yasashisa; Yasashisa unplugged Version; Voice Message
2007	Tenimyu - Dream Live 4th	OST of the Musical as Eiji Kikumaru	Track list
2007	Finalist	Special Single for the Tenimyu Hit	Finalist; Finalist - Forever With You Version; Finalist - Instrumental
2007	Tenimyu Best Actor's Album 007	As Eiji Kikumaru together with Yukihiro Takiguchi as Syuichirou Oishi	Track list
2007	Tenimyu - Absolute King Rikkai feat. Rokkaku: Second Service	OST of the Musical as Eiji Kikumaru	Track list
2007	Tenimyu Best Actor's Collection 010	Extra Seigaku Memorial Edition	Track list
2008	Destiny's Play	Tetra-Fang (Kamen Rider Kiva ED Single)	Destiny's Play; Destiny's Play NEO Romanesque Guitar Edit; Destiny's Play Additional Kivat-bat the 3rd Edit; Destiny's Play instrumental
2008	Individual-System	Tetra-Fang (Kamen Rider Kiva ED Single)	Individual-System; Individual-System technical guitar fist; Individual-System instrumental; Individual-System Nago advance fist
2008	Circle of Life	Solo Vocalist (Kamen Rider Kiva Movie ED-Single)	With you - Wataru feat. Crimson Fang
2008	Supernova	Tetra-Fang (Kamen Rider Kiva Mini-Album)	Entrance Procession; Supernova (Tribute to Emperor form); Shout in the Moonlight (Tribute to Garulu); Innocent Trap (Tribute to Basshaa); Silent Shout (Tribute to Dogga); Message (Tribute to Father)
2008	Roots of the King	Tetra-Fang (Kamen Rider Kiva ED-Single)	Roots of the King; Individual-System acoustic fist; Roots of the King instrumental; Individual-System acoustic fist instrumental
2008	Destiny	Tetra-Fang (Kamen Rider Kiva Album)	Mind Garden; Destiny's Play; Roots of the King; Lightning to Heaven; Exterminate Time; Eternity Blood; Supernova; Individual-System; Rainy Rose; Prayer: Message2; No matter who You are
2009	Kamen Rider Kiva Re-Union	Tetra-Fang (Kamen Rider Kiva Album)	Destiny's Play Re-Union; This love never ends (Emperor Edit.); Roots of the King (Acoustic Edit.); Beginning: Message 3

== Official photobooks ==
Year	Photobook title	Description	Publisher	Release date	ISBN
2005	D-Boys	D-Boys First Photobook	Tokyo News Agency	April 27, 2005	ISBN 4-924566-42-X
2006	Start!	D-Boys 2nd Photobook	Gakken Co., Ltd.	March 15, 2006	ISBN 4-05-403035-1
2007	Kōji Seto	Kōji Seto First Solo Photobook	Gakken Co., Ltd.	April 2007	ISBN 4-05-403376-8
2008	Dash	D-Boys Third Photobook	Kadokawa Marketing Co., Ltd.	December 2008	ISBN 978-4-04-895035-0
2009	SetoBook	Kōji Seto Second Solo Photobook	Shufu-to-Seikatsu Sha, Ltd.	April 2009	ISBN 978-4-391-13765-1
2010	Darling	D-Boys Fourth Photobook	Shufu-to-Seikatsu Sha, Ltd.	March 2010	ISBN 978-4-04-895035-0
2010	Et Cetera	Kōji Seto Third Photobook	Tokyo News Mook, TV Guide	11 November 2010	ISBN 978-4-86336-116-4

== Official DVDs ==
Series	Title	DVD details	Distributor	Release date
Prince Series D-Boys Collection	Koji Seto	Volume 2	Pony Canyon	May 16, 2007
D-Boys Boy Friend Series	Set Out	Volume 10	Geneon Entertainment	May 26, 2010

== Awards ==
Year	Award	Category	Work(s)	Result	Ref.
2023	44th Yokohama Film Festival	Best Actor	Love Nonetheless	Won	

== See also ==
- The Prince of Tennis

Preceded by Osamu Adachi	Eiji Kikumaru in the Prince of Tennis Musicals; 2006-2007	Succeeded by Kyousuke Hamao
