= Tetra-Fang =

Japanese band

- Origin: Japan
- Genres: Power pop; alternative metal
- Years active: 2008-2009
- Label: Avex Trax
- Members: Koji; Shuhei; Yuji; Roy; Ume; Ayano

Tetra-Fang (stylized as TETRA-FANG) is a Japanese pop-rock band considered a "limited rock unit" and was formed to perform songs on the soundtrack for the 2008 Kamen Rider Series Kamen Rider Kiva.

== History ==
Tetra-Fang was formed in 2008 to serve as a promotional band for Kamen Rider Kiva. The group composes music in a rock style and features a rotating line-up of members for each of their singles. Koji Seto who portrays Wataru Kurenai, the lead character in Kamen Rider Kiva, serves as Koji, the lead vocalist of the group for the single releases of "Destiny's Play" and "Individual-System". "Destiny's Play" was released on April 23, 2008, and came with a DVD containing a music video for the song. The single ranked 25th on the Japanese Oricon Weekly Single's Charts in its first week. "Individual-System" was released on June 25, 2008, and was the second ending theme for Kamen Rider Kiva.

An arrangement of "Individual-System" was released one month after the initial release of the original version on July 30, 2008, and featured Keisuke Kato on vocals, known as "Fight for Justice: Individual-System Nago Ver.". Also, on August 6, 2008, a mini-album was released, Supernova, after the song of the same name used as Emperor Form's theme song. It also features character songs for Garulu, Basshaa, and Dogga, two of which have been featured as the ending theme in the series.

In early December, the band released their first and only fully original album entitled Destiny. The album contained numerous character songs written by previous tokusatsu songwriters including Ryo and Shuhei Naruse. The album also included the tracks Destiny's Play, Individual System, Roots of the King and Supernova from previous releases.

Also in December, another album was released called Inherited System, which contained character songs sung by actors who have used the IXA System in the TV series. Two Tetra-Fang songs were included in the release, which were Individual System and Fight for Justice.

The group officially disbanded after Kamen Rider Kiva had completed its broadcasting, however both keyboardist Shuhei and guitarist Ayano continue to be involved in the musical side of the Kamen Rider franchise. Shuhei and Ayano reunited as part of the Kamen Rider Decade series, producing three albums of cover versions of previous Kamen Rider theme songs. The songs arranged by Shuhei featured Ayano on guitar. Both musicians have since continued providing their musical services for the franchise, composing and performing several songs featured in the various series.

The popularity of the group however resulted in a reunion for a final album consisting mostly of covers of previous Tetra-Fang songs. The album however, entitled Masked Rider Kiva Destiny's Play Re-Union, did include three original songs; two sung by Kivat and the final track sung by Wataru and Otoya as a duet.

== Members ==
- Koji Seto as Koji: vocals
- Shuhei Naruse as Shuhei: keyboard
- Yuji: lead guitar ("Destiny's Play")
- Roy: bass ("Destiny's Play")
- Ume: bass ("Individual-System" & Supernova)
- Ayano: lead guitar ("Individual-System" & Supernova)

== Discography ==
=== Singles ===
- "Destiny's Play" - April 23, 2008
1. "Destiny's Play"
2. "Destiny's Play Neo Romanesque Guitar Edit"
3. "Destiny's Play Additional Kivat-bat the 3rd Edit"
4. "Destiny's Play Instrumental"
- "Individual-System" - June 25, 2008
1. "Individual-System"
2. "Individual-System Technical Guitar Fist"
3. "Individual-System Instrumental"
4. "Individual-System Nago Advance Fist"
- "Roots of the King" - November 12, 2008
1. "Roots of the King"
2. "Individual-System Acoustic Fist"
3. "Roots of the King Instrumental"
4. "Individual-System Acoustic Fist Instrumental"

=== Mini-albums ===
- Supernova - August 6, 2008
  - CD
  1. "Entrance Procession"
  2. "Supernova [Tribute to Emperor Form]"
  3. "Shout in the Moonlight [Tribute to Garulu]"
  4. "Innocent Trap [Tribute to Basshaa]"
  5. "Silent Shout [Tribute to Dogga]"
  6. "Message [Tribute to Father]"
  - DVD
  1. "Entrance Procession" Music Clip
  2. "Supernova" Music Clip
  3. "Message" Music Clip

=== Albums ===
- Destiny - December 3, 2008
1. "Mind Garden"[Tribute to Wataru]
2. "Destiny's Play"
3. "Roots of the King"
4. "Lightning to Heaven" [Tribute to Rook]
5. "Exterminate Time" [Tribute to King]
6. "Eternity Blood" [Tribute to Bishop]
7. "Supernova"
8. "Individual-System"
9. "Rainy Rose" [Tribute to Queen]
10. "Prayer: Message2"
11. "No Matter Who You Are"

=== Other ===
- "Fight For Justice: Individual-System Nago Ver." by Keisuke Nago (Keisuke Kato) - July 30, 2008
  - For the appearance of Kamen Rider Rising IXA in the series, Keisuke Kato was asked to record a new arrangement/cover of "Individual-System" in the character of Nago. This version of the song features all new lyrics and keeps the melody of "Individual-System".
  1. "Fight for Justice"
  2. "Fight for Justice Keisuke Nago Dialog Ver. (名護啓介セリフVer., Nago Keisuke Serifu Ver.) Story Fist"
  3. "Fight for Justice Keisuke Nago Dialog Ver. (名護啓介セリフVer., Nago Keisuke Serifu Ver.) Justice Fist"
  4. "Fight for Justice Instrumental"
- "Circle of Life" by Crimson-Fang - August 6, 2008
  - Crimson-Fang was a limited rock group formed for the performance of the soundtrack of the motion picture Kamen Rider Kiva: King of the Castle in the Demon World. It featured rock/pop vocalist Nanase Aikawa and former Megadeth guitarist Marty Friedman in addition to the line-up of Tetra-Fang. "Circle of Life" was released as two singles, a 2008 version and a 1986 version, that only differed in their album cover and their B-side track.
1. "Circle of Life"
2. "Circle of Life Violin Re-Connection Ver."
3. "With You" (featuring Wataru Kurenai (紅 渡, Kurenai Wataru; Koji Seto)) on "Circle of Life 2008 Ver."/"With Me" (featuring Otoya Kurenai (紅 音也, Kurenai Otoya; Kouhei Takeda)) on "Circle of Life 1986 Ver."
4. "Circle of Life: Instrumental"
5. "With You: Instrumental" on "Circle of Life 2008 Ver."/"With Me: Instrumental" on "Circle of Life 1986 Ver."
- Inherited-System by Masked Rider IXA - December 3, 2008
  - This is a tribute album to Kamen Rider IXA and features songs performed by any actor (in character) whose character transformed into IXA. It also includes two songs by Tetra-Fang.
1. "Fight for Justice" performed by Keisuke Nago (名護 啓介, Nago Keisuke; Keisuke Kato)
2. "This Love Never Ends" performed by Otoya Kurenai (紅 音也, Kurenai Otoya; Kouhei Takeda)
3. "Feel the Same" performed by Yuri Aso & Megumi Aso (麻生 ゆり・麻生 恵, Asō Yuri & Asō Megumi; Yu Takahashi & Nana Yanagisawa)
4. "Keep Alive" performed by Jiro (次狼, Jirō; Kenji Matsuda)
5. "Don't Lose Yourself" performed by Keisuke Nago
6. "Individual-System" performed by Tetra-Fang
7. "Destiny's Play" performed by Ikemens (イケメンズ, Ikemenzu) feat. Kengo Eritate (襟立 健吾, Eritate Kengo; Kouhei Kumai)
8. "Inherited-System" performed by the Wonderful Blue Sky Organization (素晴らしき青空の会, Subarashiki Aozora no Kai; Kato, Takeda, Takahashi, Yanagisawa)
9. "Don't Lose Yourself Nago Bakugen (名護爆現) Fist1"
10. "Don't Lose Yourself Nago Bakugen (名護爆現) Fist2"
11. "IXA-cise"
- Kiva Radio
  - Kiva Radio 1
    - "Kivatte! Nichiyōbi" (キバって！にちようび, Kibatte! Nichiyōbi; "Let's Kiva! Sunday") performed by Kivat-bat the 3rd (Tomokazu Sugita)
    - "Kivatte! Nichiyōbi, Kivat to Utaou Karaoke" (キバって！にちようび キバットと歌おうカラオケ, Kibatte! Nichiyōbi Kibatto to Utaou Karaoke; "Let's Kiva! Sunday, Sing with Kivat Karaoke")
  - Kiva Radio 2
    - "Kivatte! Ofuro" (キバって！おふろ, Kibatte! Ofuro; "Let's Kiva! Bath") performed by Kivat-bat the 3rd (Sugita)
    - "Kivatte! Ofuro, Kivat to Utaou Karaoke" (キバって！おふろ, Kibatte! Ofuro Kibatto to Utaou Karaoke; "Let's Kiva! Bath, Sing with Kivat Karaoke")
- Masked Rider Kiva Destiny's Play Re-Union - June 24, 2009
1. "Destiny's Play Re-Union" performed by Tetra-Fang
2. "Supernova Love Edit" performed by Otoya Kurenai with Tetra-Fang (Kouhei Takeda)
3. "This Love Never Ends Relation Edit" performed by Wataru Kurenai (Koji Seto)
4. "Roots of the King Acoustic Edit" performed by Wataru Kurenai & Taiga Nobori (Seto & Shouma Yamamoto)
5. "IXA-cise Body Rhythm Edit" performed by Keisuke Nago
6. "Rainy Rose Queen Edit" performed by Queen Maya (Saki Kagami)
7. "Kivatte! Date" (キバって！デート, Kibatte! Dēto; "Let's Kiva! Date") performed by Kivat-bat the 3rd (Tomokazu Sugita)
8. "Kivatte! Getsuyōbi" (キバって！げつようび, Kibatte! Getsuyōbi; "Let's Kiva! Monday") performed by Kivat-bat the 3rd (Sugita)
9. "Beginning: Message 3" performed by Wataru Kurenai & Otoya Kurenai (Seto & Takeda)
