= Tomo Yanagishita =

Japanese actor

- 柳下 大
- Born: June 3, 1988 (age 38); Kanagawa Prefecture, Japan
- Years active: 2005 - 2020

Tomo Yanagishita (柳下 大, Yanagishita Tomo; born June 3, 1988) is a Japanese former actor. He was a member of the acting group D-Boys. Yanagishita joined the unit D-Date (D☆DATE) of the same agency as a new member. It was announced at the last performance of the live tour in Tokyo Dome City Hall on June 29, 2012.

== Biography ==
In 2006, Yanagishita won the Watanabe Entertainment's 3rd official D-Boys audition with the Grand Prix and became an official member of the group. In Winter of the same year, Yanagishita won the role of Kaoru Kaidoh, the viper-like 2nd year regular of Seigaku Middle School's tennis club, in the Prince of Tennis musical series, Tenimyu, as part of the third generation Seigaku cast. Prior to his casting, Kousuke Kujirai, who had played the role before him with the second Seigaku cast, had filled in as Kaidoh with the third cast due to actor Takahiro Tasaki's withdrawal from the show. Yanagishita debuted as Kaidoh in the Absolute King Rikkai feat. Rokkaku ~ First Service musical on December 13, 2006.

After the Absolute King Rikkai feat. Rokkaku ~ Second Service show, Yanagishita did not to graduate with his fellow third cast members, and instead stayed as an alternative with the fourth generation cast. He shared the role with Yuuichirou Hirata, who was cast as the new Kaidoh, for two shows: The Progressive Match Higa Chuu feat. Rikkai and Dream Live 5th, taking turns for different performances. Yanagishita graduated from his role as Kaidoh after the last performance of the Dream Live 5th live concert. During his run of the series, he got to work with fellow D-Boys members Tetsuya Makita, Kōji Seto, and Masato Wada. He and Kujirai have both played Kaidoh the longest.

In 2020, Yanagishita got married and announced his retirement from the entertainment industry.

== Filmography ==
=== Television ===
Year	Title	Role	Other notes
2007	Sunadokei	Yousuke Sonoda	TV Series (Episodes 18-21, 26, 31, 33, 38, 41 and 43)
2007	Nozokiya	Takeshi	TV Series (Episodes 10-12)
2007	Renai Shindan ~Tsubasa no Kakera~	Tsubasa	TV Series (Episodes 1-3)
2007	Yonimo Kimyona Monogatari	Ichinose	TV Series (Fall '07 Special Edition "Alumni Future" episode)
2008	Mikon Six Sisters 2	Takashi	TV Series
2008	100 Views of Romantic Love	Himself	TV Series (Episode 98, TV Asahi)
2008	Akai Ito	Fujiwara Natsuki	TV Series
2008	Ijiwaru Baasan	Guest Actor	TV Series (January 9 episode)
2009	Inochi no Baton ~ Saikou no Jinsei no Owarikata ~	Hayato Ito	TV Series
2009	Samurai High School	Wada Daisuke	TV Series
2010	Shinsengumi Peacemaker	Okita Soji	TV Series
2010	Tumbling	Mizusawa Taku	TV Series (TBS)
2011	Hanazakari no kimitachi e °	Kayashima Taiki	TV Series
2012	Akko to Bokura ga Ikita Natsu	Nakane Yoshiyuki	TV Series

=== Movies ===
Year	Title	Role	Other notes
2006	Detective Conan: Kudo Shinichi's Written Challenge	Shinichi's Classmate	TV Movie
2007	Takumi-kun Series: Soshite Harukaze ni Sasayaite	Takumi Hayama	DVD Release
2008	Bura bura ban ban	N/A	Motion Picture Film
2008	Taiga Roman: Danjo Gyakuten Yoshiwara Yuukaku	Kojiro / Takao	DVD Release
2008	Drift 05	N/A	DVD Release
2008	Shakariki	Uncredited	Motion Picture
2008	SAKURA no SONO	Machida Shuu	Motion Picture Film
2008	Akai Ito	Fujiwara Natsuki	Motion Picture Film
2009	Sho no Michi	Jinchi	DVD Release
2011	Vampire Stories - Brothers	Sei	DVD Release

== Stage Work ==
TENIMYU: THE PRINCE OF TENNIS MUSICAL SERIES (as Kaoru Kaidoh)

- The Prince of Tennis Musical: Absolute King Rikkai feat. Rokkaku ~ First Service (In Winter of 2006-2007)
- The Prince of Tennis Musical: Dream Live 4th (2007)
- The Prince of Tennis Musical: Dream Live 4th ~extra~ (2007)
- The Prince of Tennis Musical: Absolute King Rikkai feat. Rokkaku ~ Second Service (2007)
- The Prince of Tennis Musical: Progressive Match Higa feat. Rikkaidai (shared the role with Yuuichirou Hirata) (In Winter of 2007-2008)
- The Prince of Tennis Musical: Dream Live 5th (shared the role again with Hirata) (2008)

D-Boys

- 2007 - D-BOYS STAGE Volume 1 as Yagishita Kiyoshi
- 2008 - D-BOYS STAGE: The Last Game Volume 2 as Kanemoto Akio
- 2009 - D-BOYS STAGE: Karasu Volume 3 (April Performances) as Hutoshi Hazime

Other stage work

- 2007 - SWITCH WO OSUTOKI 2 ~Kimitachi wa naze ikiteirunda?~

=== Guest Star appearances ===
- 2007 - Out of Order (Live Entertainment Stage Show) as Guest Star

== Discography ==
Year	DVD	DVD cover	Release date
2006	Tenimyu - Absolute King Rikkai feat. Rokkaku ~ First Service	OST of the Musical as Kaoru Kaidoh	Track List
2007	Tenimyu - Dream Live 4th	OST of the Musical as Kaoru Kaidoh	Track List
2007	Tenimyu - Absolute King Rikkai feat. Rokkaku - Second Service	OST of the Musical as Kaoru Kaidoh	Track List
2007	Tenimyu - The Best Actors Series 010 Extra - Seigaku 3rd Regulars Memorial Edition	OST of the Musical as Kaoru Kaidoh	Track List
2007	Tenimyu - Progressive Match Higa feat. Rikkaidai	OST of the Musical as Kaoru Kaidoh	Track List
2008	Tenimyu - Dream Live 5th	OST of the Musical as Kaoru Kaidoh	Track List
2009	Natsu Doko 2009 Kaze - Team Wind version	Audio Theater for D-BOYS "Kotoshi no Natsu wa Mainichi Dokoka de D-BOYS Ukiuki Yatta Hohhohoi" event	D-BOYS CD and DVD: Natsu no Kakehashi
2009	Natsu Doko 2009 Kawa - Team River version	Audio Theater for D-BOYS "Kotoshi no Natsu wa Mainichi Dokoka de D-BOYS Ukiuki Yatta Hohhohoi" event	D-BOYS CD and DVD (as Guest): Natsu no Kakehashi

== Official DVDs ==
- 2006 - Tenimyu - Absolute King Rikkai feat. Rokkaku ~ First Service DVD as Kaoru Kaidoh
- 2007 - Tenimyu - Dream Live 4th DVD as Kaoru Kaidoh
- 2007 - D-BOYS Stage Volume 1
- 2007 - Renai Shindan ~Tsubasa no Kakera~ DVD (release date 21 November 2007)
- 2007 - Tenimyu - Absolute King Rikkai feat. Rokkaku - Second Service DVD as Kaoru Kaidoh (release date 22 November 2007)
- 2007 - Tenimyu - Supporter DVD Vol. 6 ~ Seigaku's 3rd Generation ~ (in production/release 22 December)
- 2008 - D-BOYS Stage Volume 2 ~ The Last Game
- 2009 - D-BOYS BOY FRIEND DVD series vol.5 TOMORROW

== Official Photobooks ==
Year	Photobook Title	Description	Publisher	Release date	ISBN
2008	Yanagishita Tomo	Tomo Yanagishita First Solo Photobook	Wani Books Co., Ltd.	May 14, 2008	ISBN 978-4-8470-4093-1
2008	DASH	D-BOYS Third Photobook	Kadokawa Marketing Co., Ltd.	December 2008	ISBN 978-4-04-895035-0
2010	DARLING	D-BOYS Fourth Photobook	Shufu-to-Seikatsu Sha, Ltd.	March 2010	ISBN 978-4-04-895035-0

== Special events ==
- 2007 - Tenimyu Press conference

== See also ==
- D-Boys
- D-Date
- Tenimyu
- The Prince of Tennis
- Kaidoh Kaoru
