= Takumi-kun Series: Pure =

Takumi-kun Series 4: Pure
- Directed by: Kenji Yokoi
- Based on: Pure by Shinobu Gotoh
- Starring: Kyousuke Hamao; Daisuke Watanabe
- Release date: 18 December 2010 (Japan)
- Running time: 79 minutes
- Country: Japan
- Language: Japanese

Takumi-kun Series: Pure (タクミくんシリーズ「Pure～ピュア～」) is a 2010 Japanese film based on the novel of the same name by Shinobu Gotoh. It is directed by Kenji Yokoi.

== Plot ==
Kanemitsu Shingyoji (Taiki Naito) first met Arata Misu (Ryōma Baba) when he took the school entrance examination at Shidou High School two years ago and fell in love with Misu at first sight. Although they are a couple now, Shingyoji seems to be the only one who expresses his love for Misu while Misu always treats Shingyoji coldly. When a senpai of Misu, Takahiro Sagara (Yusuke Irose), appears, it becomes a problem between them. Feeling dejected, Shingyoji moves further away from his boyfriend. Can Takumi Hayama (Kyousuke Hamao) and Giichi "Gui" Saki (Daisuke Watanabe) help the lovers?

At the same time, problem also arises between the relationship of Izumi Takabayashi (Ryo Mitsuya) and Michio Yoshizawa (Yutaka Kobayashi) when both are unable to express what they truly feel. When Yoshizawa finds that Takabayashi goes to Gui, he misunderstands him and becomes jealous.

== Cast ==
- Ryōma Baba as Arata Misu
- Taiki Naito as Kanemitsu Shingyoji
- Kyousuke Hamao as Takumi Hayama
- Daisuke Watanabe as Giichi "Gui" Saki
- Ryo Mitsuya as Izumi Takabayashi
- Yutaka Kobayashi as Michio Yoshizawa
- Yusuke Irose as Takahiro Sagara
- Yukihiro Takiguchi as Shōzō Aikaike
