= Takumi-kun Series: Soshite Harukaze ni Sasayaite =

- Directed by: Kazuhiro Yokoyama
- Screenplay by: Hiroko Kanasugi
- Based on: Soshite Harukaze ni Sasayaite by Shinobu Gotoh
- Produced by: Kōji Morimoto; Katsuji Umezawa; Takeshi Katayama; Kazumi Kawashiro; Satoshi Komatsu
- Starring: Tomo Yanagishita; Keisuke Katō; Yasuka Saitō; Yukihiro Takiguchi; Tetsuya Makita; Ryō Sakaguchi; Wataru Hatano; Hiroki Aiba; Hiroki Kōno; Orie Tōjō
- Cinematography: Hiroko Kanasugi
- Music by: Wanogen
- Production companies: Trinet Entertainment; Video Planning
- Distributed by: Bandai Visual
- Release date: 22 December 2007 (Japan)
- Running time: 75 minutes
- Country: Japan
- Language: Japanese

Takumi-kun Series: Soshite Harukaze ni Sasayaite (タクミくんシリーズ「そして春風にささやいて」; lit. And Then, I Whisper into the Spring Breeze) is a 2007 Japanese film based on the novel of the same name by Shinobu Gotoh. The film is directed by Kazuhiro Yokoyama and stars Tomo Yanagishita as Takumi Hayama and Keisuke Katō as Giichi Saki. The film was released in Japan on December 22, 2007. It is the first movie of five.

== Plot ==
Set at Shidō Academy, a boys' boarding school, the story focuses on Takumi Hayama, a lonely and shy boy who suffers from an extreme phobia of human contact and cannot bear being touched by other people. In his second year at school, Takumi is paired in a room with Giichi "Gui" Saki. Gui was brought up abroad and is the school idol with his exceptional academic performance, as well as his good looks. One day, Gui confesses to Takumi that he has been in love with him for some time. This unexpected truth of events unsettles Takumi. However, he comes to realize the true sensitivity of Gui's personality.

== Cast ==
- Tomo Yanagishita as Takumi Hayama
- Keisuke Katō as Giichi "Gii" Saki
- Yasuka Saitō as Izumi Takabayashi
- Yukihiro Takiguchi as Shōzō Aikaike
- Tetsuya Makita as Daisuke Nozaki
- Ryō Sakaguchi as Toshihisa Katakura
- Wataru Hatano as Michio Yoshizawa
- Hiroki Aiba as Sachi Inoue
- Hiroki Kōno as Takumi's Brother
- Orie Tōjō as Takumi's Mother

== Production ==
The music was composed by Wanogen. The theme used for the end credits is "Going Under Ground" by Sō Matsumoto.
