= Musical: The Prince of Tennis discography =

Series of stage musicals

Musical: The Prince of Tennis is a series of stage musicals based on the manga series The Prince of Tennis by Takeshi Konomi. Throughout the plays' run, several soundtrack albums have been released, as well as character albums released by the actors.

== Release information ==
Each soundtrack that has been released for each musical is a live recording of the performances.

Year	Title	Info
2003	Musical Tennis no Ohjisama	Live-recorded from April 30 to May 5, 2003, at Tokyo Metropolitan Art Space.: Release date: July 24, 2003.
2003-2004	Musical Tennis no Ohjisama - Remarkable 1st Match Fudomine	Live recording of the Remarkable 1st Match Fudomine musical.: Release date: April 21, 2004.
2004	Musical Tennis no Ohjisama - Dream Live 1st	Recorded live at Tokyo Metropolitan Gymnasium on June 13, 2004.: Release date: September 1, 2004.
2004	Musical Tennis no Ohjisama - More Than Limit St. Rudolph Gakuen	Live recording of the More Than Limit musical.: Release date: November 20, 2004.
2004	Musical Tennis no Ohjisama - in winter 2004-2005 side Fudomine ~special match~	Recorded live at Tokyo Metropolitan Art Space from December 29, 2004, to January 2, 2005.: Release date: March 21, 2005.
2004-2005	Musical Tennis no Ohjisama - in winter 2004-2005 side Yamabuki feat. St. Rudolph Gakuen	Recorded live at Tokyo Mielparque Hall from January 20 to 23, 2005.: Release date: April 21, 2005.
2005	Musical Tennis no Ohjisama - Dream Live 2nd	Recorded live at Tokyo Bay NK Hall on May 4, 2005.: Release date: August 10, 2005.
2005	Musical Tennis no Ohjisama - The Imperial Match Hyoutei Gakuen	Live recording of the Imperial Match Hyoutei Gakuen from August 8 to 14, 2005 and August 17 to 20, 2005.: Release date: November 20, 2005.
2005-2006	Musical Tennis no Ohjisama - The Imperial Match Hyoutei Gakuen in winter 2005-2006	No soundtrack was released for this musical (because it was a return of the Imperial Match). The CD for this musical was only released with the Musical Tennis no Ohjisama Complete CD Box set that was released on July 26, 2006. A CD single for the song, "On My Way", performed by the entire cast was also released for this musical.: Release date for the "On My Way" CD Single: March 22, 2006.
2006	Musical Tennis no Ohjisama - Dream Live 3rd	Recorded live at the Dream Live 3rd live-concert on March 29, 2006, at Zepp Tokyo.: Release date: June 14, 2006.
2006	Musical Tennis no Ohjisama - Advancement Match Rokkaku feat. Hyotei Gakuen	Live recording of Advancement Match Rokkaku from August 3 to August 13 in Tokyo, August 17 to August 19 in Osaka and August 23 to August 25 at the Meitetsu Hall in Nagoya.: Release Date: November 15, 2006.
2006-2007	Musical Tennis no Ohjisama - Absolute King Rikkai feat. Rokkaku	Live recording of the hit "Musical Prince of Tennis Abosolute King Rikkai feat. Rokkaku - First Service" performances held between December and January 2006 – 2007. Includes 15 completely new songs plus three additional songs with the complete Rikkai cast.: Release date: March 28, 2007
2007	Musical Tennis no Ohjisama - Dream Live 4th	Fourth live concert, featuring members of Fudomine, St. Rudolph, Yamabuki Chuu, Hyotei Gakuen, Rokkaku Chuu and Rikkai Daigaku Fuzoku as special guests.: Ran from March 30 to March 31, 2007, in Pacifico Yokohama.
2007	Musical Tennis no Ohjisama - Dream Live 4th ~Extra~	Additional performances in Osaka featuring all members of Rikkai Daigaku Fuzoku and Rokkaku Chuu. Guest starring Yamabuki Chuu's Kiyosumi Sengoku and Kentarou Minami, as well as Hyotei Gakuen's Gakuto Mukahi and Hiyoshi Wakashi.: Ran from May 17 to May 20, 2007

== The Musicals (first season) ==
=== Musical Tennis no Ohjisama ===
- Musical Tennis no Ohjisama
1. This is The Prince of Tennis
2. Kore ga Seigaku no Tennis-bu nanoda!
3. Kore ga Seigaku no Regular-jin nanoda!
4. Ore wa Momo-chan ~ Seigaku no Abarenbou
5. I'm Always Winner
6. Haji wo Kake! Ryoma
7. I'm Always Winner
8. The Regulars
9. Ore wa Mamushi
10. Ore wa Burning
11. Eiji vs Fuji ~ Rival na Futari
12. The Regulars
13. You Got Game?

=== Remarkable 1st Match Fudomine ===
- Musical Tennis no Ohjisama — Remarkable 1st Match Fudomine
1. The Regulars ~This is the Prince of Tennis~ Victory
2. Yappa Otoko wa Doubles Deshou!
3. Chiku Yosen 1
4. Makezugirai
5. Chiku Yosen 2
6. Victory
7. Golden Pair
8. Shinken Shoubu to wa Sou Iu Koto
9. Challenge ~ Subete wa Shori no Tameni
10. Rhythm ni Noru ze
11. Tough
12. Spot wo Nerae
13. Victory (Reprise)
14. Omae wa Seigaku no Hashira ni Nare
15. Challenge ~ Subete wa Shori no Tameni (Reprise)
16. Victory ~ Omae wa Seigaku no Hashira ni Nare
17. You Got Game?

=== Dream Live 1st ===
- Musical Tennis no Ohjisama - Dream Live 1st
1. Dream Come True
2. Kore ga Seigaku Regular-jin nanoda!
3. Makezu Kirai
4. Ore wa Momo-chan ~ Seigaku no Abarenbou
5. Tough
6. Kikumaru vs Fuji ~ Rival na Futari
7. Golden Pair
8. This is The Prince of Tennis
9. I'm Always Winner
10. The Regulars
11. Ore wa Burning!
12. Shinkenshoubu to wa Sou Iu Koto (Acoustic Version)
13. Now & Forever
14. Victory
15. Chiku Yosen
16. Challenge ~ Subete wa Shori no Tameni
17. Victory ~ Omae wa Seigaku no Hashira ni Nare
18. Make You Free

=== More Than Limit St. Rudolph Gakuen ===
- Musical Tennis no Ohjisama - More Than Limit St. Rudolph Gakuen
1. Kore ga Totaikai da!
2. Aoku Moeru Honoo
3. Erabareshi Elite Shuudan
4. Rival Ijou Teki Miman
5. Bunseki
6. Tennis ni Scenario wa nai
7. Depend On Me
8. Jyuuden Kanryou
9. Sanjuushou
10. Golden Pair Part 2
11. Hand In Hand
12. Ore wa Ore no Namae de Yobaretai
13. Omae wa Seigaku no Hashira ni Nare
14. Ore wa Ue ni Iku yo
15. Shizukanaru Toushi
16. Aoku Moeru Honoo 2
17. Dream Maker
18. Dream Come True (instrumental)
19. Jyuuden Kanryou (instrumental)
20. Now & Forever

=== In Winter 2004-2005 Side Fudomine ~Special Match~ ===
- Musical Tennis no Ohjisama - in winter 2004-2005 Side Fudomine ~Special Match~
1. To Victory
2. Yappa Otoko wa Doubles Deshou!
3. Chiku Yosen 1
4. Makezugirai
5. I'm Always Winner
6. Chiku Yosen 2
7. Victory
8. Golden Pair
9. Shinken Shoubu to wa Sou Iu Koto
10. Challenge ~ Subete wa Shouri no Tameni
11. Rhythm ni Noruze
12. Tough
13. Spot wo Narae
14. Victory (Reprise)
15. Omae wa Seigaku no Hashira ni Nare
16. Challenge ~ Subete wa Shouri no Tameni (Reprise)
17. Victory ~ Omae wa Seigaku no Hashira ni Nare~
18. You Got Game?
19. Now & Forever

=== Side Yamabuki Feat. St. Rudolph Gakuen ===
- Musical Tennis no Ohjisama - in winter 2004-2005 side Yamabuki feat. St. Rudolph Gakuen
1. Run Run Run
2. Ore ni Sashizu Suru na!
3. Shouri no Kami wa Dochira ni Hohoemu?
4. Ore wa Ore no Namae de Yobaretai
5. Ore wa Ue ni Iku yo
6. Power Up de Ikou!
7. Semero, Tsuyoku Nare!
8. Iyoiyo Keshhou, Totaikai
9. Ikuze!
10. Oretachi Jimi's
11. Good Combination
12. Yuuki vs Iji
13. Kagayake, Motto
14. Run Run Run (Reprise)

=== Dream Live 2nd ===
- Musical Tennis no Ohjisama - Dream Live 2nd
  - Disc 1
  1. Jubilee ~ Run Run Run
  2. Erabareshi Elite Shuudan
  3. Shinkenshoubu to wa Souiu Koto
  4. Ikuze! (Yamabuki Version)
  5. Kore ga Seigaku Regular-jin nanoda!
  6. Ore wa Ue ni Iku yo
  7. Shouri no Kami wa Dochira ni Hohoemu?
  8. Power Up de Ikou!
  9. Semero, Tsuyoku Nare!
  10. The Regulars
  - Disc 2
  1. Aoku Moeru Honoo
  2. Challenge ~ Subete wa Shouri no Tameni
  3. Bunseki
  4. Rhythm ni Noruze
  5. Oretachi Jimi's
  6. Good Combination
  7. Ore wa Ore no Namae de Yobaretai ~Acoustic Version~
  8. Ore ni Sashizu Suru na!
  9. Yuuki vs Iji
  10. Victory ~ Ikuze!
  11. Kagayake, Motto
  12. Crystal
  13. Jubilee ~ Final Dance Version
  14. Endo's Graduation Speech

=== The Imperial Match Hyoutei Gakuen ===
- Musical Tennis no Ohjisama - The Imperial Match Hyoutei Gakuen
1. Do Your Best!
2. Kounai Ranking Sen ~ Versus
3. Data wa Uso o Tsukanai yo
4. Yudan Sezu ni Ikou
5. Sorezore no Omoi
6. Koori no Emperor
7. Kumiawase Chusenkai
8. Sorezore no Omoi II ~ Yudan Sezu ni Ikou II
9. Yume wo Tsunage
10. Katsu no wa Hyotei
11. Sannin de Doubles
12. Moeruze BURNING!
13. Koori no Emperor II
14. Oresama no Bigi ni Bugi Wugi
15. Aitsu Koso ga Tennis no Oujisama
16. Yume no Tsunage II
17. Do Your Best! (Reprise)

=== The Imperial Match Hyoutei Gakuen in Winter ===
- Musical Tennis no Ohjisama - The Imperial Match Hyoutei Gakuen in winter 2005-2006

While no actual soundtrack was released for this musical (because it was a rerun of the previous performance), there were three additional songs ("Ikkiuchi", "Crystal" and "On My Way") for this performance that weren't included in the previous soundtrack, but a CD single was released for the song, "On My Way".

1. Do Your Best!
2. Kounai Ranking Sen ~ Versus
3. Data wa Uso o Tsukanai yo
4. Yudan Sezu ni Ikou
5. Sorezore no Omoi
6. Koori no Emperor
7. Kumiawase Chusenkai
8. Sorezore no Omoi II ~ Yudan Sezu ni Ikou II
9. Yume wo Tsunage
10. Katsu no wa Hyotei
11. Sannin de Doubles
12. Moeruze Burning!
13. Koori no Emperor II
14. Oresama no Bigi ni Bugi Wugi
15. Ikkiuchi
16. Aitsu Koso ga Tennis no Oujisama
17. Yume no Tsunage II
18. Do Your Best! (Reprise)
19. Crystal
20. On My Way

=== Dream Live 3rd ===
- Musical Tennis no Ohjisama - Dream Live 3rd
1. On My Way (Opening Version, Instrumental)
2. Do Your Best! (Rap, Hyoutei Version)
3. Do Your Best!
4. Data wa Uso Tsukanai Yo
5. Sannin de Doubles
6. Good Combination
7. Moeruze Burning!
8. Koori no Emperor
9. Makezugirai
10. Sorezore no Omoi - Yudan Sezu ni Ikou
11. Katsu no wa Hyotei
12. Sakaki no Heya
13. Koori no Emperor II
14. Ore-sama no Bigi ni Boogie Woogie
15. Season
16. Aitsu koso ga Tennis no Oujisama
17. Yume wo Tsunage
18. Ichinen Trio Medley
19. Crystal
20. On My Way
21. Run Run Run
22. Run Run Run (Encore)

=== Advancement Match Rokkaku feat. Hyotei Gakuen ===
- Musical Tennis no Ohjisama - Advancement Match Rokkaku feat. Hyoutei Gakuen
1. Try Again Seigaku
2. Gekokujou
3. My Best Tension
4. Forward, My Men!
5. Kantou Taikai Junkesshou da ze!
6. Court de ao!
7. Yudan Sezu ni Ikou
8. Shaba daba dabide
9. Power is the Best
10. Remember Hyoutei
11. Kantou Taikai Junkesshou da ze! 2
12. Acrobatics & Genius
13. Kagami no Naka no Ore
14. Kagami no Naka no Ore 2
15. Onnanoko to Chuu
16. Pressure
17. ROAD
18. Forward, My Men! ~ Try Again Seigaku
19. Season
20. On My Way

=== Absolute King Rikkai feat. Rokkaku ~ First Service ===
- Musical Tennis no Ohjisama - Absolute King Rikkai feat. Rokkaku ~ First Service
1. Must Be Strong!
2. Hijou no Tennis
3. Must Be Strong! II
4. Kiken na Game
5. Kiken na Game II
6. Bloodshot
7. Kyou made... Soshite Ashita kara
8. Yuujuou no Tennis
9. Hijou no Tennis II
10. Katsu tameni
11. Finalist
12. Climax
13. Haiagare Kaidou
14. Fukkatsu! Golden Pair
15. Petenshi daa? Nan to demo i.e.
16. Oishi no Territory
17. Kore ga Shoubu toiu mono
18. Mou mayoi wa nai
19. Next
20. Must be Strong! III ~ Finalist II
21. On My Way

=== Dream Live 4th ===
- Musical Tennis no Ohjisama - Dream Live 4th
  - Disk One
  1. Overture ~ Opening
  2. My Best Tension
  3. Oishi no Territory
  4. Fukkatsu! Golden Pair
  5. Depend on Me
  6. Haiagare Kaidou
  7. Hijou no Tennis
  8. Bloodshot
  9. Petenshi daa Nan todemo Ie
  10. Kore ga Shoubu to iu Mono
  11. Court de Aou!
  12. Onnanoko to Chuu
  13. Acrobatics & Genius
  - Disk Two
  1. Dream Maker
  2. Yume wo Tsunage
  3. Ikuze!!
  4. Kagayake, Motto
  5. ROAD
  6. Climax
  7. Shabadaba Davide
  8. Power is the Best ~ Moeruze Burning!
  9. Kiken na Game
  10. Mou Mayoi wa Nai
  11. Must be Strong! ~ Finalist
  12. TOP OF THE STAGE FOR THE TENNIS
  13. F・G・K・S
  14. On My Way

=== Absolute King Rikkai feat. ~ Second Service ===
- Musical Tennis no Ohjisama - Absolute King Rikkai feat. ~ Second Service
1. Omaera...Gakeppuchi Giri Giri
2. Koko kara ga...Ore-tachi
3. Yo nen to Ni ka getsu to Jyu go Nichi
4. Ore wa Kakou wo Ryou ga suru
5. Yo nen to Ni ka getsu to Jyu go Nichi II
6. Cha Cha ttoTsubusuze ~Bloodshot
7. Kachi ni Shyuchaku suru
8. Makeru koto no Yurusarenai Oujya ~ Hijou no Tennis
9. Kamigakari no Tennis ~ Dakara Katsu no wa...
10. Kimi wo Shinjiteru
11. Fu Rin Ka Zan
12. Ore wo Taose ~ Omae wa Seigaku Hashira ni nare
13. Samurai
14. TOP OF THE STAGE FOR THE TENNIS
15. Minami no Shima Kita Shikyaku
16. Koko kara ga Ore-tachi II
17. F.G.K.S

=== The Progressive Match Higa Chuu feat. Rikkai ===
- Musical Tennis no Ohjisama - The Progressive Match Higa Chuu feat. Rikkai
1. Iyo Iyo Zenkokutaikai
2. Yomigaerishi mono
3. Brand new Seigaku
4. Fight & Win
5. Ore-tachi no Jisho ni Haiboku wa Nai
6. Dark Horse
7. Hitotsu yari nokoshita koto
8. Maku wa Kitte Otosareta
9. Be Cool
10. Heat up
11. Tennis to wa...
12. Viking horn
13. Kourin Suru Ouja
14. Ore wa Koroshiya to Yobareru Otoko
15. Hyakuren Jitoku no Kiwami
16. Reunion ~ Heat Up II
17. F. G. K. S

=== Dream Live 5th ===
- Musical Tennis no Ohjisama - Dream Live 5th
  - Disk One
  1. Overture ~ Opening
  2. Seigaku Medley: Aoku Moeru Honoo ~ Run・Run・Run ~ THIS IS THE PRINCE OF TENNIS ~ Brand New Seigaku
  3. Ore-tachi no Jisho ni Haiboku wa Nai
  4. Makeru koto no Yurusarenai Oujya ~ Hijou no Tennis
  5. Fuurinkazan
  6. Minami no Shima Kita Shikyaku ~ Dark Horse
  7. Tennis to wa...
  8. Hitotsu yari nokoshita koto
  9. Yomigaerishi mono
  10. Ore wa Koroshiya to Yobareru Otoko
  11. Ore wa Ue ni Iku yo ~ Be Cool
  12. Ore ni sashizu suruna!
  13. Omaera Gakeppuchi Giri Giri ~ Koko kara ga... Ore-tachi
  14. Semero, tsuyoku nare!
  15. Bonus Track : Erabareshi Elite Shuudan
  - Disk Two
  1. Viking Horn
  2. Petenshi daa Nan todemo Ie
  3. Golden Pair
  4. Jyuuden Kanryou
  5. Ore wa Mamushi
  6. The Regulars
  7. Kimi wo Shinjiteru ~ Mou Mayoi wa Nai
  8. Oretachi no Aikotoba
  9. Forward, my Men ~ Try Again
  10. Reunion ~ Heat Up II
  11. F・G・K・S
  12. On My Way

=== The Imperial Presence Hyotei feat. Higa Chuu ===
- The Imperial Presence Hyotei feat. Higa Chuu - Hyotei A Cast
1. Hyoutenka no Jounetsu
2. Zengoku taikan Junjun kesshou da!
3. The Top
4. Versus - VS
5. Poker Face Fighter ~ Active Volcano
6. Sekkachi
7. Kazu to Gekiryuu
8. Jimonjitou
9. Futoufukusu e no Homage
10. Heavy Rain
11. The Top II
12. Synchro
13. Koori no Sekai
14. Ore Wa Moeru
15. Tie Break
16. Refresh Arata na Jibun e
17. Hyoutenka no Jounetsu II - The Top III
18. F. G. K. S

=== The Treasure Match Shitenhouji feat. Hyotei Gakuen ===
- Musical Tennis no Oujisama - The Treasure Match Shitenhouji feat. Hyotei Gakuen
1. One More Step
2. Kejime
3. Katta Mon Gachi Ya
4. Ecstasy
5. Boku Wa Kawaru
6. GO GO FUJI! GO SHIRAISHI!
7. Isshin Doutai
8. Bukiyou'ssu Kara
9. Isshou Ippai
10. Yuzurenai Priority - One More Step
11. Shinu Ki De Burning!
12. Hyakuren Jitoku No Kiwami VS Saiki Kanpatsu No Kiwami
13. Tenimuhou No Kiwami Ichiban Chikai Otoko
14. Koitsu Wo Taoshitai
15. This Is My Best
16. Ore-tachi No Aikotoba
17. F. G. K. S

=== Dream Live 6th ===
- Musical Tennis no Ohjisama - Dream Live 6th
  - Disk One
1. Overture
2. Do Your Best!
3. Koori no Emperor ~Hyoutenka no Jounestu
4. Katta Mon Gachi Ya
5. Ecstasy ~GO GO FUJI! GO SHIRAISHI!
6. Boku Wa Kawaru
7. Kore ga Shoubu to iu Mono ~Hijou no Tennis
8. Ore wa Koroshiya to Yobareru Otoko
9. Yudan Sezu ni Ikou
10. SAMURAI
11. Koori no Sekai
12. Ore wa Moeru
13. Omae wa Seigaku no Hashira ni Nare
14. Isshin Doutai
15. Bukiyou'ssu Kara
16. Kikumaru vs Fuji~Rival na Futari~Good Combination
17. Koitsu Wo Taoshitai
  - Disk Two
1. Kejime
2. Shinu Ki De Burning!
3. Pokerface Fighter ~ Active Volcano
4. REMEMBER HYOTEI
5. Heavy Rain
6. Challenge ~Sube Wa Shouri no Tameni
7. Ore-tachi no Aikotoba
8. Now & Forever
9. One More Step ~ The Top
10. This is my Best!
11. Refresh Arata na Jibun e
12. On My Way
13. F.G.K.S

=== Final Match Rikkai First feat. Shitenhouji ===
1. WINNING ROAD
2. CHECKMATE!
3. FuuRinKaInZanRai
4. Tezuka PHANTOM
5. Yudan sezu ni ikou 2009
6. Sago he no CANON
7. Ore no Senpai
8. Akai DEVIL
9. Ore no Senpai/ Ore no Kohai
10. Sanrenpa ni shikaku nashi
11. Uchira no HEART wa PERCUSSION
12. PINCH
13. Kokoro no Hitomi ~ CLOSED EYE!
14. ILLUSION
15. PLATINUM PAIR
16. Saigo no GOLDEN PAIR
17. Omoidase Echizen!
18. CHECKMATE! ~ WINNING ROAD
19. F.G.K.S.

=== Final Match Rikkai Second feat. the Rivals ===
1. MATCH POINT
2. HIGHLIGHT
3. Boku wa dare?
4. Omoidase, Echizen! 2
5. Arata na sekai he
6. RIVALS
7. Seisei Doudou
8. RIVALS - Atobe
9. RIVALS (reprise)
10. Kami no Ko
11. DEAD END
12. Ore wa iku
13. Shinogi wo Kezuru monotachi
14. Saishuu kessen
15. Kore de mou owari kai?
16. LEVEL UP
17. Yukimura no TENNIS
18. Kurayami ~ Boku wa dare? (reprise)
19. Ten'imuhou no Kiwami
20. Omae wa PRINCE
21. BANZAI
22. GRADUATION
23. FINAL MEDLEY
24. DESTINY
25. On My Way
26. F・G・K・S

=== Dream Live 7th ===
- Disc one
1. Overture
2. ON MY WAY (opening version)
3. WINNING ROAD
4. Seigaku MEDLEY - For Dream Live 7th (MATCH POINT ~ Aoku Moeru Honoo ~ RUN RUN RUN ~ BRAND NEW SEIGAKU ~ DO YOUR BEST! ~ MATCH POINT)
5. Rikkai MEDLEY (Oretachi no Jisho ni Haiboku wa nai ~ Makeru koto no Yurusarenai Ouji ~ Hijou no TENNIS)
6. Omaera...gakeppuchi Girigiri
7. DEAD END
8. Uchira no HEART wa PERCUSSION
9. RIVALS For Dream Live 7th ~ Shinogi wo Kezuru monotachi (Rivals ~ SPOT wo nerae ~ Shinken Shoubu to wa sou iu koto ~ Ore ni sashizusuruna ~ Yuuki VS Iji ~ ore wa ore no namae de yobaratai ~ COURT de aou! ~ DARK HORSE ~ Rivals - Atobe ~ Aitsukoso TENNIS no Oujisama ~ Rivals (reprise) ~ Shinogi wo kezuru monotachi)
10. Yudan sezu ni ikou 2009
11. VICTORY ~ Omae wa Seigaku no Hashira ni nare
12. Semero, Tsuyoku Nare!
13. Kagayake, Motto
- Disc Two
1. Katta Mon Gachi ya ~ Isshin Doutai
2. ECSTASY
3. ILLUSION
4. Kokoro no Hitomi ~ CLOSED EYE
5. Yukimura no TENNIS
6. FuuRinKaInZanRai ~ FuuRinKaZan
7. Omoidase, Echizen! For Dream Live 7th
8. Boku wa dare? (reprise) ~ Ten'imuhou no Kiwami
9. Kore ga Seigaku regular jin na no da!
10. Shodai MEDLEY For Dream Live 7th (Ore wa momo-chan~Seigaku no abaren bou ~ Tough ~ ore wa BURNING ~ Kikumaru VS Fuji~RIVAL na Futari)
11. THIS IS THE PRINCE OF TENNIS
12. DESTINY
13. Forward, my men!
14. Saigo no GOLDEN PAIR
15. Aitsukoso ga TENNIS no oujisama ~ I'M ALWAYS WINNER
16. GRADUATION
17. This is my best! ~ REUNION ~ Heat Up II
18. BANZAI ~ Omae wa PRINCE
19. Season
20. F.G.K.S
21. On my Way

== The Musicals (second season) ==
=== Seigaku VS Fudomine ===
1. THIS IS THE PRINCE OF TENNIS
2. Kore ga Seigaku no TENNIS bu na no da
3. Ore wa Momo-chan ~ Seigaku no abaran bou
4. Kore ga Seigaku regular jin na no da! (2nd Season ver.)
5. I'M ALWAYS WINNER ~ The Regulars
6. Ore wa Mamushi
7. The Regulars (Reprise)
8. Makezugirai
9. Chiku yosen (2nd season ver.)
10. VICTORY
11. Challenge ~ subete wa shouri no tame ni
12. Golden Pair
13. Shinken Shoubu to wa sou iu koto
14. Rhythm ni noruze
15. SPOT wo nerae
16. Ore no touzen
17. VICTORY (reprise)
18. Omae wa Seigaku no hashira ni nare
19. Challenge ~ Subete wa shouri no tame ni (reprise)
20. Jumping up! High touch!

=== Seigaku VS St.Rudolph/Yamabuki ===
1. 24 - 365
2. Erabareshi Elite shuudan
3. Rivals ijou teki miman
4. Medley - Depend on me ~ Jyuuden kanryou
5. Scenario wo buchi kowase!
6. Medley - Hand in Hand ~ Marionette
7. Ore ni sashizu suru na!
8. ore wa ue ni iku yo
9. Marionette (reprise)
10. Shizuka naru toushi
11. Dream Maker
12. Medley - ikuze ~100% no kokoro
13. oretachi jimii's
14. Lucky Sengoku
15. Yuuki VS Iji
16. Kagayake, motto
17. 24 - 365 (reprise)
18. Jumping up! High touch!

=== Seigaku VS Hyoutei ===
1. Get The Victory!
2. Kounai Ranking sen
3. Data wa uso wo tsukanai yo
4. Yudan sezu ni yukou 2011
5. Itetsuku mono no atsuki omoi short ver.
6. Ore wo regular ni
7. Sorezore no omoi ~ Yudan sezu ni yukou
8. Yume wo tsunage
9. Katsu no wa Hyoutei
10. Sannin de doubles
11. Moeru ze Burning!
12. Itetsuku mono no atsuki omoi
13. Yoishirero bolero
14. Ikki uchi
15. Shin · Aitsu koso ga Tennis no oujisama
16. Tomorrow For You & I
17. Get The Victory! II
18. Jumping up! High touch!

=== Dream Live 2011 ===
1. Opening 24／365
2. Get The Victory！
3. Erabareshi elite shuudan
4. 100% no kokoro
5. Koori no emperor
6. Shinken shoubu to wa souiu koto
7. Yudan sezu ni yukou~Yudan sezu ni yukou 2011
8. Katsu no wa Hyoutei
9. Ore wo regular ni
10. Oresama no bigi ni boogie woogie
11. ore wa ue ni iku yo~Ore no touzen ~My best tension
12. Lucky Sengoku
13. Rhythm ni noru ze
14. Juuden kanryou
15. a.Koori no emperor (acoustic ver.)/ b.Hand in Hand & Marionette
16. Shizukanaru toushi
17. Dream Maker
18. Tomorrow For You & I
19. Do Your Best！
20. Data wa uso wo tsukanai yo
21. Rival ijou tekimiman feat. Ore wa momo-chan/ Tough
22. Yappa otoko wa doubles deshou
23. Golden pair
24. Yume wo tsunage
25. Itetsuku mono no atsuki omoi
26. Yoishirero Bolero
27. Challenge ~ Subete wa shouri no tame ni
28. The regulars
29. VICTORY
30. Season
31. That's My Future！Let's Go！
32. Jumping up! High touch!

=== Seigaku VS Rokkaku ===
1. The best players
2. Renshuu Insuto ~ Omae wa Seigaku no hashira ni nare
3. Kantou taikai junkesshou daze!
4. Court de aou!
5. Wasuregataki tatakai
6. Forward, my men!
7. Bane-Davi Sukatto scat
8. Power is the best (new version)
9. Remember Hyoutei
10. Kantou taikai junkesshou daze! II
11. Acrobatic & Genius (new version)
12. Kagami no naka no ore (ballad)
13. Kagami no naka no ore II
14. Onna no ko to chuu (new version)
15. Onna no ko to chuu II
16. Pressure
17. Standby
18. Forward, my men!～TRY AGAIN
19. ROAD
20. That's my future！ Let's go ！
21. Jumping Up！High touch！

=== Seigaku VS Rikkai ===
1. Hijou no Tennis
2. Must be strong!
3. Kiken na game
4. Bloodshot
5. Yuujou no tennis
6. Hijou no tennis II
7. Katsu tame ni
8. Climax
9. Haiagare Kaidoh
10. Mattero yo Momoshiro
11. Pentenshi daa? Nanto demo i.e.
12. Ooishi no territory ~Fukkatsu! Golden Pair
13. Kore ga shoubu to iu mono
14. NEXT
15. Makeru koto no yurusarenai ouja ~ Hijou no tennis
16. Omaera.. gakeppuchi girigiri
17. Koko kara ga... oretachi
18. yonen to nikagetsu to juugonichi
19. Oretachi wa kako wo ryougasuru
20. yonen to nikagetsu to juugonichi II
21. Kachi ni shuuchaku otoko
22. Dakara katsu no wa...
23. Shinjiteru ~ mou mayoi wa nai
24. Fuurinkazan
25. ore wo taose ~ Omae wa Seigaku no hashira ni nare
26. SAMURAI
27. Good Bye Today
28. Koko kara ga... oretachi II
29. That's my future！ Let's go ！

=== Seigaku Farewell Party ===
1. Kore ga Seigaku regular jin na no da!
2. Get the Victory! ~ The best players
3. Standby
4. Shizukanaru toushi
5. Data wa uso wo tsukanai yo
6. Court de aou!
7. Omaera...gakepucchi girigiri
8. Bloodshot
9. Do your best!
10. Yudan sezu ni yukou 2011
11. SAMURAI
12. Haiagare Kaidoh ~ Mattero yo Momoshiro
13. Ore wa burning
14. Yume wo tsunage
15. Sannin de doubles
16. Acrobatic & genius (new version)
17. Mou mayoi wa nai
18. Tomorrow For You & I
19. Ichinen trio medley
20. Good Bye Today
21. Forward, my men!～TRY AGAIN
22. ROAD
23. NEXT～Must Be Strong！～Finalist
24. That's My Future！Let's Go！～Jumping up！ High touch！

=== Seigaku VS Higa ===
1. Iyoiyo zenkoku taikai
2. Yomigaerishi mono
3. Brand New Seigaku 2012
4. Fight & Win
5. Oretachi no jisho ni haiboku wa nai
6. Dark Horse 2012
7. Hitotsu yarinokoshita koto
8. Maku wa kitte otosareta
9. Be Cool
10. Heat Up
11. Tennis to wa...
12. Viking
13. Hitori de doubles
14. Shuunen no homura
15. Ore wa koroshiya to yobareru otoko
16. Tezuka Zone
17. Reunion~Heat Up II
18. WE ARE ALWAYS TOGETHER

=== Dream Live 2013 ===
1. Iyoiyo zenkoku taikai
2. Opening~24/365
3. Run Run Run
4. Makeru koto no yurusarenai ouja~Hijou no tennis
5. Koori no emperor~Itetsuku mono no atsuki omoi
6. Minami no shima kara kita shikaku~Dark Horse 2012
7. Be Cool
8. Tough
9. Power up de ikou!
10. Yomigaerishi mono
11. Hitotsu yarinokoshita koto~court de aou!
12. Tennis to wa...
13. Kagami no naka no ore~Kagami no naka no ore II
14. Semero, Tsuyoku nare!
15. Koko kara ga... oretachi
16. Petenshi daa? Nanto demo i.e.
17. Ore wa koroshiya to yobareru otoko
18. Kikumaru VS Fuji~Rival na futari
19. Hitori de doubles
20. Depend on me
21. Kore ga shoubu to iu mono
22. Fuurinkazan
23. Brand New Seigaku 2012
24. REMEMBER HYOUTEI
25. Viking
26. Kimi wo shinjiteru ~ Mou mayoi wa nai
27. Kourin suru ouja
28. I'M ALWAYS WINNER
29. Challenge ~ Subete wa shouri no tame ni
30. Reunion ~ Heat Up
31. Kagayake Motto
32. On My Way～Jumping up! High touch!
33. WE ARE ALWAYS TOGETHER
34. You got game?
35. Shinken shoubu wa souiu koto
36. THAT'S MY FUTURE ! LET'S GO!～F・G・K・S

== The Musical Prince of Tennis - Best Actor's Series ==
=== Shirota Yuu as Tezuka Kunimitsu ===
- Musical Prince of Tennis The Best Actors Series 001 - Shirota Yuu as Tezuka Kunimitsu (The Imperial Match Hyotei Gakuen Memorial Album)

Released on December 19, 2005.

1. Owari Naki Stage
2. Ashita Fuku Kaze
3. Tachitsukusu Kanata
4. Instrumental ~ Tezuka vs Inui
5. Yudan Sezu ni Ikou (Kunimitsu Solo Edition)
6. Instrumental ~ Kikumaru・Momoshiro vs Oshitari・Mukahi
7. Semero, Tsuyoku Nare
8. Instrumental ~ Fuji vs Akutagawa
9. Omae wa Seigaku no Hashira ni Nare (Kunimitsu Solo Edition)
10. Yuu Shirota Message for You

=== Katou Kazuki as Atobe Keigo ===
- Musical Prince of Tennis The Best Actors Series 002 - Kazuki Katou as Atobe Keigo (The Imperial Match Hyotei Gakuen Memorial Album)

Released on December 19, 2005.

1. Koori no Emperor (Keigo Solo Edition)
2. Instrumental ~ Inui・Kaidou vs Shishido・Ohtori
3. Instrumental ~ Kawamura vs Kabaji
4. Oresama no Bigi ni Boogie-Woogie
5. Instrumental ~ Tezuka vs Atobe
6. Do Your Best! (Keigo Solo Edition)
7. Higher!
8. Solitaire
9. Kazuki Katou Message for you
10. Flaming Ice

=== Aiba Hiroki as Fuji Syuusuke ===
- Musical Prince of Tennis The Best Actors Series 003 - Hiroki Aiba as Fuji Syuusuke

Released on July 26, 2006.

1. Tsubasa no Kizuna
2. Shootin' your smile
3. Yume no Kidou
4. Instrumental ~ Fuji vs Ryoma
5. Yume wo Tsunage ... Syuusuke Solo Edition
6. HAND IN HAND
7. Instrumental ~ Fuji vs Akutagawa Jirou DL3. KIRA★KIRA ver.
8. Instrumental ~ Fuji vs Mizuki
9. Run Run Run — Brother's Edition
10. Aiba Hiroki & KENN Message for You

=== Saitou Takumi as Oshitari Yuushi & Aoyagi Ruito as Mukahi Gakuto ===
- Musical Prince of Tennis The Best Actors Series 004 - Saitou Takumi as Yuushi Oshitari & Aoyagi Ruito as Gakuto Mukahi

Released on July 26, 2006.

1. Instrumental ~ On My Way DL3 ver.
2. Katsu no wa Hyoutei
3. Do Your Best! RAP! ver.
4. Instrumental ~ Kounai RANKING Sen
5. Instrumental ~ Kawabe ni Te
6. Makezugirai ~ Yuushi and Gakuto Edition
7. Bohemian Blue
8. Jump to it!
9. Missing Piece
10. Saitou Takumi & Aoyagi Ruito Message for You

=== Sakurada Doori as Echizen Ryoma ===
- Musical Prince of Tennis The Best Actors Series 005 - Sakurada Doori as Ryoma Echizen

Released on December 16, 2006.

1. I want it all
2. NO MYSELF NO LIFE
3. Eien no Baton
4. Instrumental ~ Ryoma vs Hiyoshi
5. My Best Tension
6. Instrumental ~ Kawamura・Momoshiro vs Amane・Kurobane II
7. Instrumental ~ Kaidou vs Aoi
8. Forward, my men! ... RK Edition
9. ROAD
10. Sakurada Doori & Minami Keisuke Message for you

=== IRE as Amane Hikaru and Shindou Gaku as Kurobane Harukaze ===
- Musical Prince of Tennis The Best Actor's Series 006 - IRE as Hikaru Amane and Shindou Gaku as Harukaze Kurobane

Released on December 16, 2006.

1. DABIBANE DANSU
2. Gouin ni GOING MY WAY
3. Blast
4. Court de Aou ~ D2 Edition
5. Instrumental ~ Kawamura・Momoshiro vs Amane・Kurobane
6. SHABADABA DABIDE
7. Instrumental ~ Fuji・Kikumaru vs Saeki・Itsuki
8. Instrumental ~ ACROBATIC & GENIUS
9. Forward, my men!～TRY AGAIN ... DA・VI・BA・NE Edition
10. IRE & Shindo Gaku Message for you

=== Takiguchi Yukihiro as Oishi Syuuichirou & Seto Kouji as Kikumaru Eiji ===
Title	Year	Details	Peak chart positions	Sales
Title	Year	Details	JPN	Sales
Musical: The Prince of Tennis Best Actors Series 007: Yukihiro Takiguchi as Shuichiro Oishi & Koji Seto as Eiji Kikumaru (Yukihiro Takiguchi & Koji Seto)	2007	Released: July 25, 2007; Label: Index Music; Format: CD; Track listing: 1. Long and Winding Road; 2. GOLDEN SMILE; 3. Answer; 4. Instrumental ~ Ano hi ano toki 5. Fukkatsu! Golden Pair; 6. Instrumental ~ Momoshiro・Kaidou vs Kuwahara・Marui II; 7. Instrumental ~ Echizen vs Kirihara II; 8. Good Combination; 9. Depend on me 10. Takiguchi Yukihiro & Seto Kouji Message for you	62	—

=== Nakagauchi Masataka as Niou Masaharu and Baba Tooru as Yagyuu Hiroshi ===
- Musical Prince of Tennis The Best Actors Series 008 - Nakagauchi Masataka as Niou Masaharu and Baba Tooru as Yagyuu Hiroshi

Released on July 25, 2007.

1. SUMMER BREEZE
2. Jibun wo Shinjite
3. I SHOULD
4. Depend on me ... Rikkai D1 Edition
5. Instrumental ~ Ryoma vs Kirihara I
6. Instrumental ~ Momoshiro & Kaidou vs Kuwahara & Marui I
7. Petenshi daa? Nan To De Mo Ie
8. Instrumental ~ Oishi & Kikumaru vs Niou & Yagyuu II
9. Must Be Strong ~ Finalist ... Rikkai D1 Edition
10. Nakagauchi Masataka & Baba Tooru Message for you

=== Kanesaki Kentarou as Sanada Genichirou and Yagami Ren as Yukimura Seiichi ===
- Musical Prince of Tennis The Best Actors Series 009 - Kanesaki Kentarou as Sanada Genichirou and Yagami Ren as Yukimura Seiichi

Released on December 22, 2007.

1. Galaxy
2. HOLIDAY
3. Hatsukoi
4. Instrumental ~ Inui vs Yanagi
5. Makeru Koto no Yurusarenai Ouja ~ Hijou no Tennis ... 2-TOP Edition
6. Instrumental ~ Fuji vs Kirihara
7. Instrumental ~ Ryoma vs Sanada
8. Kimi Wo Shinjiteru
9. Mou Mayoi wa Nai
10. Kanesaki Kentarou & Yagami Ren Message for you

=== 3rd Generation Seigaku Regulars ===
- Musical Prince of Tennis The Best Actors Series 010 Extra - Seigaku 3rd Regulars Memorial Edition

Released on December 22, 2007.

1. ALWAYS
2. TRY AGAIN SEIGAKU
3. Power is the best
4. Yonnen to Nikagetsu to Juugonichi
5. Kachi ni Shuuchaku Suru Otoko
6. Ore Wa Taose ~ Omae wa Seigaku no Hashira ni Nare
7. SAMURAI
8. Koko Kara Ga... Ore-tachi II
9. TOP OF THE STAGE FOR THE TENNIS
10. Seigaku 3rd Generation Regulars Message for you

=== Daisuke Watanabe as Tezuka Kunimitsu ===
- Musical Prince of Tennis The Best Actors Series 011 - Watanabe Daisuke as Tezuka Kunimitsu

Released on July 30, 2008.

1. DASH!
2. Jewel in my heart
3. Blazing Shine
4. Instrumental ~ Tezuka vs Kite
5. Yomi ga erashi mono
6. Instrumental ~ Ryoma Echizen vs Kei Tanishi II
7. Instrumental ~ Fuji. Kawamura vs Chinen. Rin Hirakoba I
8. Semero, tsuyoku nare! ... Kunimitsu Solo Edition
9. Aoku moeru honoo ... Kunimitsu Solo Edition
10. Watanabe Daisuke Message for you

=== Luke.C as Kite Eishirou ===
- Musical Prince of Tennis The Best Actors Series 012 - Luke.C as Kite Eishirou

Released on July 30, 2008.

1. DEAD OR ALIVE
2. Minami no Shima kara kita Shikaku
3. Instrumental ~ Ryoma Echizen vs Kei Tanishi I
4. Dark Horse
5. Ore wa koroshi ya to yobareta otoko
6. Instrumental ~ Kikumaru Eiji vs Kai Yuujirou
7. Instrumental ~ Fuji ・ Kawamura VS Chinen ・ Hirakoba Rin II
8. Buddies
9. No Tears
10. Luke C. Message for you
