= Takumi-kun Series: Niji-iro no Glass =

- Directed by: Kenji Yokoi
- Based on: Niji-iro no Glass by Shinobu Gotoh
- Starring: Kyousuke Hamao; Daisuke Watanabe
- Release date: 25 April 2009 (Japan)
- Running time: 74 minutes
- Country: Japan
- Language: Japanese

Takumi-kun Series: Niji-iro no Glass (タクミくんシリーズ「虹色の硝子」) is a 2009 Japanese film based on the novel of the same name by Shinobu Gotoh. The film is directed by Kenji Yokoi and stars Kyousuke Hamao as Takumi Hayama and Daisuke Watanabe as Giichi Saki.

== Plot ==
Takumi Hayama (Kyousuke Hamao) and Giichi "Gui" Saki (Daisuke Watanabe) are now a couple. Their relationship becomes rocky when Gui starts paying attention to first-year student Tooru Morita (Yuki Hiyori). Unaware that Gui is trying to bring together Takeshi Suzuki (Yūta Takahashi) and Morita, who are attracted to each other, before Suzuki leaves school for hospital due to his deteriorating terminal illness condition, Takumi begins to doubt Gui's love and thinks that he has given up on him.

== Cast ==
- Kyousuke Hamao as Takumi Hayama
- Daisuke Watanabe as Giichi "Gui" Saki
- Yukihiro Takiguchi as Shōzō Aikaike
- Yūta Takahashi as Takeshi Suzuki
- Kei Hosogai as Izumi Takabayashi
- Yuki Hiyori as Tooru Morita
