= PureBoys =

Former J-pop group

- Origin: Tokyo Prefecture, Japan
- Genres: J-pop
- Years active: 2007–2012
- Labels: Pull Up Records
- Past members: Toru Baba; Keisuke Kato; Masei Nakayama; Yukihiro Takiguchi; Kouhei Takeda; Ryosuke Miura; Keisuke Minami; Hiromi Sakimoto; Yuichi Sato; Ren Yagami; Takuya Nagaoka; Kenta Itogi
- Website: www.pureboys.jp

PureBoys (stylized PureBOYS from 2007–08) was a Japanese project group formed in 2007 by Ameba. PureBoys was conceived as an endorsement featuring young actors from various talent agencies to promote Ameba's blogging service, Ameba Blogs, but soon included several acting and singing projects for the members. The group's music is released through the indie label Pull Up Records. After releasing several singles and stage plays together, PureBoys disbanded in 2012.

== History ==
The group formed in June 2007 and opened its official website July 20, 2007.

Released of its debut single Kampai Je T'aime September 26, 2007, released Back Stage File #1 DVD October 3, 2007, staging of Act.1: 7Cheers! ~Jibun to iu Daichi Kara~ October 3–8, 2007 re-release of Kampai Je T'aime CD October 10, 2007, released First Photobook November 16, 2007, released 7Cheers! DVD December 21, 2007.

On December 28, 2007 it announced two new members: Sakimoto and Sato. On March 21, 2008 Takiguchi, Kato and Nakayama announced their graduation from the group via blog entry. March 28, 2008 was the graduation ceremony during the PureBOYS internet broadcast show Harajuku AmeSuta Gakuen.

released second single Kimi no Te / Psyche na Heart June 25, 2008, staging of Act.2: 7Dummy's Blues August 20–27, 2008.

On August 31, 2008 Takeda graduated from PureBOYS and on September 12, 2008 Itogi was introduced as the newest member.

released 7Dummy's Blues DVD November 5, 2008, released third single CAUTION June 10, 2009 and released of fourth single Zenkaidansu November 25, 2009.

On September 13, 2012, PureBoys announced through their official website that they were disbanding after their final event on October 27.

== Members ==
=== Current ===
- Keisuke Minami (南圭介)
- Sakimoto Hiromi (崎本 大海)
- Yuichi Sato (佐藤 雄一)
- Ren Yagami (八神 蓮)
- Takuya Nagaoka (永岡 卓也)
- Kenta Itogi (絲木 建太)

=== Former ===
- Toru Baba (馬場 徹)
- Keisuke Kato (加藤 慶祐)
- Masei Nakayama (中山 麻聖)
- Yukihiro Takiguchi (滝口 幸広)
- Kouhei Takeda (武田 航平)
- Ryosuke Miura (三浦涼介)

== Discography ==
=== Studio albums ===
Title	Year	Details	Peak chart positions	Sales
Title	Year	Details	JPN	Sales
Pure Vox	2010	Released: April 14, 2010; Label: Pull Up Records; Format: CD; Track listing: 1. "Kanpai Je T'aime" (乾杯ジュテーム); 2. "Zenryaku, Michi no Ue Yori" (前略、道の上より); 3. "Bambina" (バンビーナ); 4. "Love & Joy"; 5. "Kimi no Te" (君の手); 6. "Psyche na Heart" (サイケなハート); 7. "Caution"; 8. "Ai Got You" (愛Got You); 9. "Zenkai Dance" (ゼンカイダンス); 10. "Season"; 11. "One Kiss (Ashita wa Kyō yori Kimi ga Suki)" (One Kiss～明日は今日より君がスキ～); 12. "PreGo!"	—	—
"—" denotes releases that did not chart or were not released in that region.

=== Singles ===
Title	Year	Peak chart positions	Sales	Album
Title	Year	JPN	Sales	Album
"Kanpai Je T'aime" (乾杯ジュテーム)	2007	31	—	Pure Vox
"Kimi no Te" (君の手) / "Psyche na Heart" (サイケなハート)	2008	34	—	Pure Vox
"Caution"	2009	86	—	Pure Vox
"Zenkai Dance" (ゼンカイダンス)	2009	187	—	Pure Vox
"—" denotes releases that did not chart or were not released in that region.

=== DVDs ===
DVD	Release	Description
Back Stage File #1	October 3, 2007 PCBP-11567	Assorted clips from dance lessons for the Kampai Je T'aime PV, their weekly internet radio show Harajuku AmeSuta Gakuen, recording the tracks for the first single, filming the PV. Includes Self Videos made by the members themselves and interviews.
Act.1: 7Cheers! ~Tobe! Jibun to iu Daichi Kara~	December 21, 2007 PCBP-11585	Recording of their stage play, which ran October 3–8, 2007. Includes rehearsal videos and a special tour of the theater and props.
Back Stage File #2	August 20, 2008 PCBP-11589	Assorted clips from the CD sale commemoration event, dance lessons, recording the tracks for the second single, filming the PV. Includes interviews.
Act.2: 7Dummy's Blues	November 5, 2008 PCBP-11597	Recording of their stage play, which ran August 20–27, 2008. Includes backstage rehearsal videos.
