= Takumi-kun Series: Ano, Hareta Aozora =

- Directed by: Kenji Yokoi
- Based on: Ano, Hareta Aozora by Shinobu Gotoh
- Starring: Kyousuke Hamao; Daisuke Watanabe
- Release date: June 15, 2011
- Running time: 89 minutes
- Country: Japan
- Language: Japanese

Takumi-kun Series: Ano, Hareta Aozora (タクミくんシリーズ「あの、晴れた青空」) is a 2011 Japanese film based on the novel of the same name by Shinobu Gotoh. The film is directed by Kenji Yokoi and stars Kyousuke Hamao and Daisuke Watanabe.

== Plot ==
The death anniversary of Takumi's older brother is approaching and when Gui tells Takumi that he wishes to visit his brother's grave with him, it makes Takumi very happy as he has intended to invite Gui too. However, on the same day, there is a snooker tournament organised by the school to welcome new students. When Takumi finds out that Gui will be taking part in the tournament, he feels betrayed and upset, believing Gui has broken his promise and that he has never intended to go with him. Can Gui participate in the tournament and yet not break his promise to Takumi?

== Cast ==
- Kyousuke Hamao as Takumi Hayama
- Daisuke Watanabe as Giichi "Gui" Saki
- Yukihiro Takiguchi as Shōzō Aikaike
- Ryōma Baba as Arata Misu
