= Takumi-kun Series: Bibō no Detail =

- Directed by: Kenji Yokoi
- Based on: Bibō no Detail by Shinobu Gotoh
- Starring: Kyousuke Hamao; Daisuke Watanabe
- Release date: 30 January 2010 (Japan)
- Running time: 81 minutes
- Country: Japan
- Language: Japanese

Takumi-kun Series: Bibō no Detail (タクミくんシリーズ「美貌のディテイル」) is a 2010 Japanese film based on the novel of the same name by Shinobu Gotoh. It is directed by Kenji Yokoi and stars Kyousuke Hamao and Daisuke Watanabe.

== Plot ==
This is the beginning of third-year school and Takumi Hayama (Kyousuke Hamao) is looking forward to see Giichi "Gui" Saki (Daisuke Watanabe) after the school break. Takumi will no longer be Gui's roommate, and Gui, who is now the third floor's dorm head, has his own room. He soon discovers that since Gui's return from New York, not only has his appearance changed but also his attitude towards him and the others. Besides being cold and avoiding him on purpose, Gui even suggests they stop seeing each other for a while. Deeply affected by the sudden change in Gui's attitude and rejection, Takumi's human contact phobia relapses. Takumi's roommate Arata Misu (Ryōma Baba), who dislikes Gui, informs Gui of Takumi's relapse and his intention to cure Takumi of his phobia if they were to break up.

== Cast ==
- Kyousuke Hamao as Takumi Hayama
- Daisuke Watanabe as Giichi "Gui" Saki
- Yukihiro Takiguchi as Shōzō Aikaike
- Ryōma Baba as Arata Misu
- Bishin Kawasumi as Kanemitsu Shingyouji
- Mio Akaba as Toshihisa Katakura
- Yasuka Saitō as Masataka Nozawa
