= Daisuke Watanabe (actor) =

Japanese actor, headed by BMI Inc (born 1982)

- 渡辺 大輔
- Born: November 6, 1982 (age 43); Kanagawa Prefecture, Japan
- Occupation: Actor
- Years active: 2006-present
- Height: 182 cm (6 ft 0 in)
- Spouse: Ami Norimatsu (m. 2020)
- Website: www.watanabe-daisuke.net

Daisuke Watanabe (渡辺 大輔, Watanabe Daisuke; born November 6, 1982) is a Japanese actor, headed by BMI Inc. Watanabe is best known for his role as Kunimitsu Tezuka of the fourth generation Seigaku cast in The Prince of Tennis musical series, Tenimyu. In 2016 he made his first appearance on the boards of the Imperial Theatre in musical 1789 - Bastille no Koibitotachi.

He married actress Ami Norimatsu in 2020.

== TV ==
- Ultraman Mebius (2006) as George Ikaruga
- Danshiing!!(男子ing!!)(2012.9.14 TOKYO MX)
- NHK Umai (2010–present)

== Movie ==
- Ultraman Mebius & Ultraman Brothers (2006) as George Ikaruga
- Takumi-kun Series 2: Nijiiro no Garasu (2009) as Saki Giichi
- Takumi-kun Series 3: Bibou no Detail (2010) as Saki Giichi
- Takumi-kun Series 4: Pure (2010) as Saki Giichi
- Battle of Demons (2010) as Mitsuaki Shizuma
- Gachinko kenka joto (2010) as Jiro
- Takumi-kun Series 5: Ano, Hareta Aozora (2011) as Saki Giichi
- Fumoukaigi (2013)
- Bokutachi No Kougen Hotel (2013) as Ryuuya Sawashiro
- Magic Knight (2014)
- Kabadieen! Gekitotsu Dokuro Koko hen (2014) as Atsushi Fushimi

== Stage ==
- The Prince of Tennis Musical Series (Tenimyu) as Kunimitsu Tezuka
  - The Prince of Tennis Musical: The Progressive Match Higa Chuu feat Rikkai (In Winter of 2007-2008)
  - The Prince of Tennis Musical: Dream Live 5th (2008)
  - The Prince of Tennis Musical: The Imperial Presence Hyotei Gakuen feat. Higa Chuu (2008)
  - The Prince of Tennis Musical: The Treasure Match Shitenhouji feat Hyotei Gakuen (2008-2009)
  - The Prince of Tennis Musical: Dream Live 6th (2009)
- SAKURA (2009)
- Rock'n Jam Musical (2009)
- BUTLER×BATTLER (2010)
- Jinsei wa Showtime (2010)
- Miracle Train (2010, 2012)
- Cantarella Musical (2011) as Giovanni
- The Prince of a Wonderful Town (2012) as Ichijou Ran
- The Prince of a Wonderful Town - Chapter 2 (2013)
- Fumoukaigi (2013)
- Dracula (2013) as Jack Seward
- LIVING ADV「STEINS;GATE」 (2013) as Okabe Rintarou
- CLUB SLAZY The 2nd invitation～Sapphire～ (2013) as King
- Musical - Uchoten Kazoku (The Eccentric Family): Atelier Duncan (2014)
- Blood Brothers (2015)
- South Pacific (2015, 2016)
- Honganji (2016)
- 1789 - Bastille no Koibitotachi (2016) as Camille Desmoulins
- Musical Biohazard ~Voice of Gaia~ (2016) as Dan Gibson
- Romeo & Juliette (2017) as Tybalt

== DVD ==
- Men's DVD "With the Wind" (released August 29, 2008)
- Acedeuce - Watanabe Daisuke "Search for my roots" (2009)
- Real Faces - Watanabe Daisuke (2015)
- SLF - Watanabe Daisuke "Third Photobook 'ROAD' - Making DVD"

== CD ==
- Musical Prince of Tennis The Best Actors Series 011 - Watanabe Daisuke as Tezuka Kunimitsu (released July 30, 2008)
- 1789 - Bastille no Koibitotachi - Version d'égalité (2016)
- 1789 - Bastille no Koibitotachi - Version de liberté (2016)

== Photobook ==
- Men's Photobook "Prologue" (released September 17, 2008)
- Day & Night - Watanabe Daisuke in Vietnam (released January 2013)
- Watanabe Daisuke - Third Photobook "ROAD" (released February 2016)

== Commercials ==
- 2006 "Japan Airlines Hawaii 2006 SPORTS × SMILE
- November 2011: LION "GUEST & ME"
- "March 2012 LION "GUEST & ME"
- June 2012 LION "SmileCosmetique"
- April 2014 Zelia Health Way "inner cosmetic 5000"

Preceded by Keisuke Minami	Kunimitsu Tezuka in the Prince of Tennis Musicals; 2008	Succeeded by Ryoma Baba
