= Juken Sentai Gekiranger vs Boukenger =

Juken Sentai Gekiranger vs. Boukenger

Japanese name
- Kanji: 獣拳戦隊ゲキレンジャーＶＳボウケンジャー
Transcriptions
- Revised Hepburn: Jūken Sentai Gekirenjā tai Bōkenjā
- Directed by: Noboru Takemoto
- Written by: Naruhisa Arakawa
- Starring: Hiroki Suzuki; Mina Fukui; Manpei Takagi; Riki Miura; Sotaro; Yuka Hirata; Hirofumi Araki; Mitsuomi Takahashi; Yasuka Saito; Masashi Mikami; Chise Nakamura; Haruka Suenaga; Masayuki Deai
- Release date: March 14, 2008
- Running time: 46 minutes
- Country: Japan
- Language: Japanese

Juken Sentai Gekiranger vs. Boukenger (獣拳戦隊ゲキレンジャーＶＳボウケンジャー, Jūken Sentai Gekirenjā tai Bōkenjā) is team up crossover, film featuring Gekiranger vs Boukenger. It was directed by Noboru Takemoto and written by Naruhisa Arakawa. The film was released on March 14, 2008. It is the first team-up to be in wide-screen, appropriate as Boukenger and Gekiranger were the first Sentai series to be themselves shown in wide-screen. The film is dedicated to Machiko Soga who died in 2006.

== Plot ==
Dark Shadow's Shizuka of the Wind sneaks into SCRTC to steal a mysterious red jewel, leading to the Gekirangers confronting her. When BoukenBlack, BoukenYellow, and BoukenBlue appear, a battle among the two groups over the jewel occurs at Shizuka attempts to retreat until BoukenSilver retrieves from her. However, Satoru Akashi arrives and takes the jewel, to his former teammates' dismay. Soon after, Master Xia Fu reveals that the red jewel in his possession is one of two that belonged to the Cosmic Kenpō Master Pachacamac (宇宙拳法の使い手パチャカマック, Uchū Kenpō no Tsukaite Pachakamakku), who gave them to Bruce Ee after their lengthy 200-day battle. While this occurred, Sakura goes after the blue jewel in the Rin Jū Hall, and with Satoru, they battle Rio and Mere, who join them soon after to gain the power that the Cosmic Kenpō style offers. The Gekirangers and Boukengers head to South America where they race towards the Darkness Pathway ruins as Bouken Silver, Geki Violet, and Geki Chopper battle Rin Jū Hippotamus-Ken Bākā. But once at the top, after they're too late to stop the villains from getting to the Cosmic Kenpō's secrets, Satoru reveals that Sakura was actually possessed by Pachacamac's descendant, the evil Cosmic Kenpō Master Pachacamac XII (宇宙拳法の使い手パチャカマック１２世, Uchū Kenpō no Tsukaite Pachakamakku Jū Ni Sei), who uses his power to turn Rio, Mere, and Bākā into his pawns. The Gekirangers and Boukengers team up to free Rio and Mere before all 13 stop Pachacamac XII in an epic battle on the moon.

== Cast ==
- Hiroki Suzuki as Jyan Kandou
- Mina Fukui as Ran Uzaki
- Manpei Takagi as Retu Fukami
- Riki Miura as Gou Fukami
- Sotaro as Ken Hisatsu
- Yuka Hirata as Mele
- Hirofumi Araki as Rio
- Mitsuomi Takahashias Satoru Akashi
- Yasuka Saito as Masumi Inou
- Masashi Mikami as Souta Mogami
- Chise Nakamura as Natsuki Mamiya
- Haruka Suenaga as Sakura Nishihori
- Masayuki Deai as Eiji Takaoka
- Kazue Itō as Miki Masaki
- Naoki Kawano as Long
- Mami Yamasaki as Shizuka
- Shigeru Saiki as Morio Makino

=== Voice cast ===
- Ichirô Nagai as Master Xia Fu
- Akira Ishida as Bae
- Hideyuki Hori as DaiKenjin Zubaan
- Yuji Kishi as Baka
- Shoma Kai as Bruce Ee

== Theme Song ==
Opening theme

- "Juken Sentai Gekiranger" (獣拳戦隊ゲキレンジャー Jūken Sentai Gekirenjā?)
- Lyrics: Neko Oikawa
- Composition: Takafumi Iwasaki
- Arrangement: Seiichi Kyōda
- Artist: Takayoshi Tanimoto with Young Fresh on chorus

Ending theme

- "Tao" (道（タオ） Tao?)
- Lyrics: Shoko Fujibayashi
- Composition: Katsuki Maeda (前田 克樹 Maeda Katsuki?)
- Arrangement: Kazunori Miyake (三宅 一徳 Miyake Kazunori?)
- Artist: Ichirou Mizuki with Young Fresh (Chorus)
