= Tokumei Sentai Go-Busters the Movie: Protect the Tokyo Enetower! =

- The shared poster for Fourze the Movie and Go-Busters the Movie

Japanese name
- Kanji: 特命戦隊ゴーバスターズ THE MOVIE 東京エネタワーを守れ!
Transcriptions
- Revised Hepburn: Tokumei Sentai Gōbasutāzu Za Mūbī Tōkyō Enetawā o Mamore!
- Directed by: Takayuki Shibasaki
- Written by: Yasuko Kobayashi
- Based on: Tokumei Sentai Go-Busters by Yasuko Kobayashi
- Produced by: Motoi Sasaki; Naomi Takebe; Koichi Yada; Akihiro Fukada
- Starring: Katsuhiro Suzuki; Ryouma Baba; Arisa Komiya; Hiroya Matsumoto
- Narrated by: Shoo Munakata
- Cinematography: Fumio Matsumura
- Music by: Megumi Ōhashi
- Production companies: TV Asahi; Toei Company; Toei Video; Toei Agency; Bandai
- Distributed by: Toei Company
- Release date: August 4, 2012
- Running time: 27 minutes
- Country: Japan
- Language: Japanese

Tokumei Sentai Go-Busters the Movie: Protect the Tokyo Enetower! (特命戦隊ゴーバスターズ THE MOVIE 東京エネタワーを守れ!, Tokumei Sentai Gōbasutāzu Za Mūbī Tōkyō Enetawā o Mamore!) is the theatrical release for the 36th Super Sentai Series Tokumei Sentai Go-Busters. The film was released on August 4, 2012, double-billed with the Kamen Rider Fourze film Kamen Rider Fourze the Movie: Space, Here We Come!. Tokyo Tower's mascot character Noppon (ノッポン) will also make an appearance in the film.

== Plot ==
Meeting Ryuji Iwasaki, Yoko Usami, and their Buddyroid partners, Hiromu Sakurada and Cheeda Nick join them in the maiden voyage of the FS-0O, an original Buster Machine, and its Buddyroid Ene-tan. But upon being altered to an Enetron disruption in the Akeisho District, where the Enetron regulation system Tokyo Enetower (東京エネタワー, Tōkyō Enetawā) is located, Hiromu takes control of the FS-0O to finds a group of Bulgers gathering water for the Metaloid Steamloid. The Go-Busters battle the Buglers with the Buddyroids covering the civilians before Steamloid shoots off a steam that corrodes the Buddyroids' bodies. As the Buddyroids are being tended to, learning of their enemy's ability that explained why no Valgass Megazord is being transported, the Go-Busters find that Tokyo Enetower is emitting transport energy. By then, Masato Jin arrives and points the team to an item on the tower that would teleport the surrounding area to Hyper Space for its Enetron Tanks once fully powered. With Masato unable to help as Beet J. Stag falls victim to Steamloid's steam, Ene-tan offers her aid to get the Go-Busters to Tokyo Enetower to defeat the Metaloid before deploying the Buster Machines.

Though Enter states their futility against the legions of Buglers, Blue Buster purposely overheats to take out the Buglers so Red Buster and Yellow Buster can fight their way through with the former battling Steamloid and managing to plug the Metaloid's pipes. But when the Go-Busters' Weak Points take effect, they are nearly killed when the FS-0O comes to their aid to take the Go-Busters to safety. After having their wounds tended to, with Steamloid's mist fading so their Megazords can fight, the Go-Busters learn that Enter is using some of the Enetron amassed in the Tokyo Enetower to bring in the four Megazord archetypes and a fifth mysterious model. With three minutes left, the Go-Busters quickly destroy Steamloid with forty seconds left to get into their Buster Machines before the four Valgass Megazords arrive.

With two minutes left, GT-02 Gorilla knocks the Vaglass Megazords down to climb the tower while Go-Buster Ace uses the RH-03 to take the tower from above. However, Enter counters by piloting Megazord Type Epsilon and sends Go-Buster Ace and the GT-02 into the bay. Luckily, with the SJ-05 aiding them, Go-Buster Ace and the GT-2 combined with the FS-0O into Go-Buster Kero-Oh. Engaging Megazord Epsilon after taking out Megazord Gamma, Go-Buster Kero-Oh breaks up with Go-Buster Ace destroys Megazord Epsilon while the other Busters destroy the Vaglass Megazords as the FS-0O destroys the teleportation device before the time runs out. However, a new problem rises from the FS-0O damaging Tokyo Enetower with the other Buster Machines repairing the tower. As Enter washes ashore while vowing revenge, the Go-Busters and their Buddyroids go sight seeing at Tokyo Enetower.

== Cast ==
- Hiromu Sakurada: Katsuhiro Suzuki (鈴木 勝大, Suzuki Katsuhiro)
- Ryuji Iwasaki: Ryoma Baba (馬場 良馬, Baba Ryōma)
- Yoko Usami: Arisa Komiya (小宮 有紗, Komiya Arisa)
- Cheeda Nick (Voice): Keiji Fujiwara (藤原 啓治, Fujiwara Keiji)
- Gorisaki Banana (Voice): Tesshō Genda (玄田 哲章, Genda Tesshō)
- Usada Lettuce (Voice): Tatsuhisa Suzuki (鈴木 達央, Suzuki Tatsuhisa)
- Masato Jin: Hiroya Matsumoto (松本 寛也, Matsumoto Hiroya)
- Beet J. Stag (Voice): Yuichi Nakamura (中村 悠一, Nakamura Yūichi)
- Ene-tan (Voice): Nozomi Tsuji (辻 希美, Tsuji Nozomi)
- Takeshi Kuroki: Hideo Sakaki (榊 英雄, Sakaki Hideo)
- Toru Morishita: Naoto Takahashi (高橋 直人, Takahashi Naoto)
- Miho Nakamura: Fuuka Nishihira (西平 風香, Nishihira Fūka)
- Enter: Syo Jinnai (陳内 将, Jinnai Shō)
- Steamloid (Voice): Taiten Kusunoki (楠 大典, Kusunoki Taiten)
- Narration: Shoo Munakata (宗方 脩, Munakata Shū)

== Songs ==
Ending theme

- "Kizuna ~ Go-Busters! (2012 Summer MOVIE UNIT)" (キズナ～ゴーバスターズ! (2012 Summer MOVIE UNIT), Kizuna ~ Gōbasutāzu! (Nisenjūni Samā Mūbī Yunitto); "Bonds ~ Go-Busters! (2012 Summer MOVIE UNIT)")
  - Lyrics: Shoko Fujibayashi
  - Composition, Arrangement: Kenichiro Oishi
  - Artist: Katsuhiro Suzuki & Keiji Fujiwara, Ryouma Baba & Tesshō Genda, Arisa Komiya & Tatsuhisa Suzuki
