= Ai no Kotodama =

Japanese manga series

- Cover of the Japanese version of vol. 1, released on July 22, 2000

愛の言霊
- Genre: Boys' love
- Manga
- Written by: Keiko Konno
- Published by: Frontier Works
- Imprint: Daria Comics
- Magazine: Daria
- Original run: 2000 – 2003
- Volumes: 2
- Live-action film
- Directed by: Satoshi Kaneda
- Produced by: Satoshi Kaneda
- Written by: Rie Yokota
- Music by: Moku
- Studio: Video Planning
- Released: October 27, 2007
- Runtime: 72 minutes
- Live-action film

Ai no Kotodama: Sekai no Hate Made
- Directed by: Satoshi Kaneda
- Produced by: Satoshi Kaneda
- Written by: Hiroko Kanasugi
- Studio: Video Planning
- Released: June 12, 2010
- Runtime: 89 minutes
- icon

Ai no Kotodama (愛の言霊; lit. 'The Power of Love Language') is a Japanese manga series by Keiko Konno. It was serialized in the boys' love manga magazine Daria from 2000 to 2003. A live-action film adaptation was released on October 27, 2007. A live-action film sequel titled Ai no Kotodama: Sekai no Hate Made, based on the short story Sekai no Hate Made compiled with Ai no Kotodama's volumes, was released on August 7, 2010.

== Plot ==
Shinya Otani and Miyako Tachibana have been inseparable since high school. Now college students, both live together in a small rented apartment in the city while keeping their relationship as a secret, in order to avoid unnecessary complications. However, their happy life begins to fall apart after they meet Yukiko Mizusawa, an old friend from high school. While Tachibana welcomes her with open arms, Otani is not as excited as he is, mainly because at school there used to be rumors that Tachibana and Mizusawa were dating. As time goes by, Otani can not help feeling more and more jealous of Mizusawa, especially after realizing how perfect she was and believing that she was in love with Tachibana. His jealousy only gets stronger when she gives Tachibana a perfume for his birthday called "Jealousy", which turns out to be the same one that she uses. Otani becomes hostile and unfriendly, even beginning to doubt about the feelings of his lover for him and treating him coldly. This situation continues until, due to a series of misunderstandings after another, both argue and decide to separate for a while.

Otani refuges in the apartment of Shougo Sunochi, a college friend who deals with a long-distance relationship with a young American boy named Alfred. Tachibana, meanwhile, tries to fix the things between them and sends Otani a text message citing him to talk, but he does not see it as his cell phone stops working after getting wet. Believing that Otani had ignored him, Tachibana begins to fall into depression. Mizusawa, aware that something bad was happening between the two, finds the courage to confess to Otani that it was really him and not Tachibana who had always been in love with, only to come to the shocking realization that Otani and Tachibana were in fact, a couple.

After clarifying things, Otani and Tachibana make up again. Otani, feeling sorry for his behavior, invites Mizusawa to throw fireworks with them at their university, where Mizusawa concludes that her feelings for Otani would never be reciprocated, but that was okay because she had always enjoyed seeing them together. The film ends with Otani and Tachibana being a happy couple again and enjoying their company, with Otani hoping that one day his words of devotion, having so much power, will reach Tachibana.

== Characters ==
- Yasuka Saitō as Miyako Tachibana
- Hidenori Tokuyama as Shinya Otani
- Rinako Matsuoka as Yukiko "Yuki" Mizusawa
- Masashi Kagami as Shougo Sunochi
- Junko Ōkura as Kana Morikawa
- Yui Iwata as Yūko Kitagaki
- Kentarō Sakai as Ramen Shop's Owner
- Kimiaki Tasaka
- Shiomi Andō

== Media ==
=== Manga ===
Ai no Kotodama is written and illustrated by Keiko Konno. It was serialized in the boys' love manga magazine Daria. The chapters were later released in two bound volumes by Frontier Works under the Daria Comics imprint.

| No. | Japanese release date | Japanese ISBN |
|---|---|---|
| 1 | July 22, 2000 | 978-4861340338 |
| 2 | November 20, 2003 | 978-4861340116 |

=== Film ===
A live-action film adaptation of Ai no Kotodama was produced by Video Planning and released in theaters nationwide across Japan on October 27, 2007. The film stars Yasuka Saitō as Miyako Tachibana and Hidenori Tokuyama as Shinya Ōtani. Prior to the film's release, a DVD containing behind-the-scenes footage was released on October 24, 2007. The film was later released on DVD on January 25, 2008. The film's theme song is "Eve" by Hidenori Tokuyama. Tokuyama also performed the song "Life" as an insert song for the film.

A sequel titled Ai no Kotodama: Sekai no Hate Made was released in select theaters nationwide on August 7, 2010. The story is based on the short story Sekai no Hate Made released in the tankōbon of Ai no Kotodama. The film stars Makoto Uenobori as Hirofumi Sasaki and Ryunosuke Kawai as Shinji Tamura. Yasuka Saitō reprised his role as Miyako Tachibana from the previous film. Several elements of the story were changed for the film adaptation, such as making the characters into working-class adults when they were high school students in the original manga. Kawai composed and performed the theme song to the film. Prior to the film's release, a DVD containing behind-the-scenes footage was released on June 23, 2010. The film was later released on DVD on October 22, 2010.
