= Yasuka Saitō =

Japanese actor

- Born: Yasuka Saitō (齋藤 康嘉); June 29, 1987 (age 38); Kanagawa, Japan
- Occupations: Actor, Model
- Years active: 2005–present
- Height: 173 cm (5 ft 8 in)

Yasuka Saitō (齋藤 ヤスカ, Saitō Yasuka; born June 29, 1987) is a Japanese actor, best known for the role of Masumi Inou in the 2006–2007 tokusatsu series GoGo Sentai Boukenger.

== Entertainment career ==
=== Television ===
- Hana Yori Dango (TBS, 2005, episode 1)
- GoGo Sentai Boukenger as Masumi Inou/Bouken Black (TV Asahi, 2006/2007)
- Fuuma no Kojirou as Byakko (TV Tokyo, 2007)

=== Cinema ===
- The Prince of Tennis as Shinji Ibu (Animate, 2006)
- Mirrorman: REFLEX as Takashi (Tsuburaya, 2006)
- GoGo Sentai Boukenger The Movie: The Greatest Precious as Masumi Inou/Bouken Black (Toei, 2006)
- GoGo Sentai Boukenger vs. Super Sentai as Masumi Inou/Bouken Black (Toei, 2007)
- Juken Sentai Gekiranger vs Boukenger as Masumi Inou/Bouken Black (Toei, 2008)
- Kamen Rider Den-O: I'm Born! as Newt Imajin (voice) (Toei, 2007)
- Ai no Kotodama as Tachibana Miyako (Frontier Works, 2007)
- Takumi-kun Series: Soshite Harukaze ni Sasayaite (2007) as Izumi Takabayashi
- SS as Akira (Toho, 2008)
- Takumi-kun Series 3: Bibou no Detail as Masataka Nozawa (2010)
- Love Place: Shiawase no Katachi as Souta (2013)

=== Theatre ===
- The Prince of Tennis Musical: The Progressive Match Higa Chuu feat. Rikkai – Rin Hirakoba (2007)
- Magdala na Maria Musical (2009) as Clara
- Air Gear Musical 3: Top Gear Remix – Aeon Clock (2010)
- Saint Seiya Super Musical – Lyra Orpheus (2011)
