= Atashinchi no Danshi =

- Genre: Drama/Comedy/Family
- Starring: Maki Horikita; Osamu Mukai; Yoshinori Okada; Yusuke Yamamoto; Koji Seto; Tomoki Okoyama
- Opening theme: Infinity by GIRL NEXT DOOR
- Country of origin: Japan
- Original language: Japanese
- No. of episodes: 11

Production
- Running time: 54 minute episodes

Original release
- Network: Fuji Television
- Release: April 14 – June 23, 2009

Atashinchi no Danshi (アタシんちの男子, Atashinchi no Danshi) is a Japanese drama produced by Fuji Television starring actress Maki Horikita. The producer, director, and screenwriter for the series consists of the same team that created the successful 2007 drama Hanazakari no Kimitachi e. The series ran from Tuesday, April 14 to June 23, 2009, in the 9:00 PM time slot.

== Plot summary ==
Chisato Mineta (Maki Horikita), a 20-year-old homeless girl who moves about from parks to net cafes. Her mother died of illness, and when her father disappears after earning an incredible 100 million Yen debt, she is chased out of her home. Chisato spends her life running from debt collectors living as a homeless person. One day she gets caught by debt-collectors to force her to pay the 100 million Yen debt her father left behind. Where then a president of a huge toy company (Okura Shinzo) comes and rescues her by paying off the debt but then tricks her into marrying him. She then finds out that he only has one month to live and is in need of a "wife" to take care of him. If she stays married to him then she does not have to pay back the debt but if she leaves then all the money has to be returned immediately in cash.

A month later, she finds out that the president actually has more conditions than just being his wife. She must also live in the Trick Heart Castle with his six sons, all adopted to be successors of the company, and act as their mother for three months in order for the debt to be fully paid. However, each son has hidden himself away from the rest of the family and treat each other as mere strangers that live in the same household. Will Chisato be able to open up their hearts and turn these strangers into a loving family?

== Cast ==
Group	Cast	Role	Note
Lead Role	Maki Horikita	Mineta/Chisato Okura	20 years old Chisato lost her mother to illness at a young age. Her father, an impulsive gambler, has disappeared, leaving her with a 100 million Yen debt. After marrying Shinzo Okura, she becomes the stepmother of his six sons. Over time, she comes to get along with all six sons, but later discovers that she is actually Shinzo's daughter and Fu's little sister. It was revealed that she was never legally Shinzo's wife.
Lead Role	Jun Kaname	Fū Ōkura	30-years-old first son, Fū is a free person, but unemployed. His real father is Okura Shinzo. His mother was a hostess at a bar, so his father could not publicly reveal that Fū was his son. At one point, Fū wanted Chisato to become his girlfriend, but the real purpose of it was to keep his many girlfriends at bay. He has fifty different licenses, including one for boxing. Fu is revealed to be Chisato's older half brother.
Lead Role	Yoshinori Okada	Takeru Ōkura	27 years old second son, Takeru is a member of a delinquent bike gang, yet is kind-hearted. Originally, Takeru believed that his father wanted him to become Shinzo's son so that Takeru could inherit money and send it to his father, but in time, it becomes apparent that was not the real reason why Takeru's father sent him to the Okura household. He seems to be developing a romantic interest in Chisato but seeing his brothers also feeling the same way, particularly after seeing both Sho and Chisato, he holds his feelings inside.
Lead Role	Osamu Mukai	Shō Ōkura	25 years old third son, Sho works as a host who moves from establishment to establishment to maintain his status as number one host based on his outward appearance and his conversational abilities. Initially living outside the Ōkura household, he cares for Riki, his son, and works as door-to-door salesman at day and as host in night. He is the mastermind of the Ōkura brothers. He develops a romantic interest in Chisato.
Lead Role	Yusuke Yamamoto	Masaru Ōkura	22 years old fourth son, Masaru is the charismatic model of an exclusive magazine. He is very popular among the ladies, but something in his past caused him to have a phobia of women so severe that he can't be within one meter of a woman. Because his parents died after rescuing from a fire when he went in to retrieve a toy, he believes that he killed them. His sister also survived. He too, falls for Chisato.
Lead Role	Koji Seto	Satoru Ōkura	17 years old fifth son, Satoru is a high school student and seems to be one of the more aggressive brothers. At a young age, he was marked as a genius magician, but because of scandals his parents caused he was bullied in school, therefore he locked himself up in his room for a year after getting being adopted by Okura Shinzo. He too, falls for Chisato.
Lead Role	Okayama Tomoki	Akira Ōkura	12 years old sixth son. He is extremely intelligent and has no interest in the family inheritance because he makes plenty of money via the stock market. He always falls asleep at exactly 9.00PM. He is the only one of the six sons who actually feels Chisato is his mother.
Miracle Toymaker	Koji Yamamoto	Shuji Tokita	Company Director
Miracle Toymaker	Reiko Takashima	Kyoko Koganei	Legal Adviser
Others	Masao Kusakari	Shinzo Okura	Company President. He adopted all of his six sons.
Others	Takeshi Tsuruno	Yutaka Kokudo	Works at a Net Cafe. He has a crush on Chisato and is always helping her with her problems.
Others	Shingo Tsurumi	Toru Mineta	He is Chisato's father. He racked up a 100 million Yen debt and ran away, leaving Chisato to deal with the debt. It is revealed that he gambled to raise money to pay for Chisato's mother's medical bills. He truly loves Chisato's mother.
Others	Noriko Eguchi	Rosemary Inoue	Housekeeper
Others	Kento Nagayama	Heiji Majima	Works at Net Cafe. He has a crush on Chisato and always trying to help.
Others	Ayumu Maruyama	Riki Okura	Sho's son
Others	Reina Asami	Saki	Sho's ex-girlfriend

== Audience Rating ==
Episode	On Air (Japan)	Title	Rating (Japan)	Remark
Ep 01	April 14, 2009	Homeless Mother VS Six Strange Sons	14.1%	10 Mins Extra
Ep 02	April 21, 2009	Trust, Be Trusted	11.0%	-
Ep 03	April 28, 2009	Saving First Love	9.6%	-
Ep 04	May 5, 2009	Kidnapping Project!	9.4%	-
Ep 05	May 12, 2009	Kiss From Fuu?!	12.3%	-
Ep 06	May 19, 2009	Fuu's Girlfriend is Chisato?!	12.0%	-
Ep 07	May 26, 2009	Closer Moment!	9.5%	-
Ep 08	June 2, 2009	From Thriftiness Comes Love!?	11.3%	-
Ep 09	June 9, 2009	Goodbye, Takeru?!	10.4%	-
Ep 10	June 16, 2009	The Surprising Truth!	9.8%	-
Ep 11	June 23, 2009	A Treasure Called Family	10.4%	-
