= Keisuke Katō =

Japanese actor (born 1988)

- 加藤 慶祐
- Born: September 2, 1988 (age 38); Wakō, Saitama, Japan
- Occupation: Actor
- Years active: 2006-2017, 2018-present
- Agent: G-Star.Pro
- Height: 184 cm (6 ft 0 in)

Keisuke Katō (加藤 慶祐, Katō Keisuke; born September 2, 1988) is a Japanese actor. He is best known for his roles as Kousuke Kitamura (Ivory) in TV Tokyo's drama Happy Boys and Keisuke Nago/Kamen Rider Ixa in TV Asahi's tokusatsu series Kamen Rider Kiva. Also, he is one of PureBoys, though on March 21, 2008 he announced his graduation from the group alongside colleagues Yukihiro Takiguchi and Masei Nakayama. This graduation was made official on March 31, 2008; the "graduation ceremony" was on March 28, 2008 during the PureBoys' weekly school-themed internet broadcast show. He graduated from Nihon University.

In 2016, he launched his apparel brand "StarLean". On March 31, 2017, he left the talent agency Box Corporation to retire from the entertainment business, but from 2018, he is affiliated with the talent agency G-Star.Pro.

== Filmography ==
=== TV ===
- Happy! 2 (TBS, 2006)
- Happy Boys (TV Tokyo, 2007) as Kousuke Kitamura (Ivory)
- Hanazakari no Kimitachi e / Ikemen Paradise (Fuji TV, 2007) as Hikaru Yao
- Hontou ni Atta Kowai Hanashi Summer Special 2007 (FujiTV, 2007)
- Tadashii Ouji no Tsukurikata (TV Tokyo, 2008) as Tamon Sakura [ep. 12]
- Kamen Rider Kiva (TV Asahi, 2008) as Keisuke Nago/Kamen Rider Ixa
- Mei-chan no Shitsuji (Fuji TV, 2009) as Roppongi
- Buzzer Beat! (Fuji TV, 2009) as Yoichi Oze

=== Film ===
- The Death Game Park(2010)
- Madafakutori (lead role) as Akira
- Ongakubito (2010)
- Takumi-kun Series: Soshite Harukaze ni Sasayaite (2007) as Giichi Saki (Gii)
- Kamen Rider Kiva: The King of Hell Castle (2008) as Keisuke Nago/Kamen Rider Ixa
- Kamen Rider × Kamen Rider Gaim & Wizard: The Fateful Sengoku Movie Battle (2013) as Kiva Army Warlord

=== Stage ===
- 7Cheers!~Tobe! Jibun To Iu Daichi Kara~ [with PureBOYS] (October 3–8, 2007)
- Masked Rider Kiva Live&Show @Zepp Tokyo [with Kiva cast] (August 7, 2008)
- Masked Rider Kiva Christmas Live&Show: Holy Fang Party [with Kiva cast] (December 25, 2008)

=== CD ===
- "Happy Boys Image Collection 3 ~In the Future~" as Ivory (Kousuke Kitamura), 2007
- "Kampai Je T'aime" [with PureBOYS], 2007
- "Fight for Justice ~Individual-System NAGO ver.~" as Keisuke Nago, 2008
- "Inherited-System Masked Rider IXA Tribute Album" as Keisuke Nago, 2008
- "Don't lose yourself" as Keisuke Nago, 2008
- "IXA-cise" as Keisuke Nago, 2008
- "IXA-cise2 (Body rhythm Edit.)" as Keisuke Nago, 2009
- "Kato Keisuke Pieces of Dream"
