= Ryōma Baba =

Japanese actor

- 馬場 良馬
- Born: December 15, 1984 (age 41); Chiba Prefecture, Japan
- Occupation: Actor
- Years active: 2008–present
- Agent: Toki Entertainment
- Height: 180 cm (5 ft 11 in)
- Website: Official profile

Ryōma Baba (馬場 良馬, Baba Ryōma; born December 15, 1984 in Chiba Prefecture) is a Japanese actor who is affiliated with Toki Entertainment. He played the role of Ryuji Iwasaki (Blue Buster) in the 2012 Super Sentai TV series Tokumei Sentai Go-Busters. His blood type is B.

== Biography ==
Baba was a scout in office officials at the local entertainment industry.

In April 2008, his full-fledged debut was in the television drama Tokyo Ghost Trip. From the same year, Baba made five appearances as Kunimitsu Tezuka in Tenimyu. Later on, he was active in theater and films.

In 2011, his first main role was in the film Crazy-ism. The film was officially exhibited in the 35th Montreal World Film Festival "Focus on World Cinema Department".

In 2012, Baba appeared in Tokumei Sentai Go-Busters as Ryuji Iwasaki/Blue Buster.

His hobbies are watching films and he is good at cooking.

== Filmography ==
=== TV series ===
Year	Title	Role	Other notes
2008	Here is Greenwood	Nagata	Episode 8
2012-13	Tokumei Sentai Go-Busters	Ryuji Iwasaki/Blue Buster	
2015	Shuriken Sentai Ninninger	Kiroku Ise	Episode 30
2016	Yowamushi Pedal Live Action	Yuusuke Makishima	
2020	Kamen Rider Zero-One	Enmusubi Match	Episode 23
2025	No.1 Sentai Gozyuger	Rei Gushima	Episode 21-23, 28-34

=== Films ===
Year	Title	Role	Other notes
2010	Takumi-kun Series 3: Bibou no Detail	Ararat Misu	
2010	Takumi-kun Series 4: Pure	Ararat Misu	
2011	Takumi-kun Series 5: Ano, Hareta Aozora	Ararat Misu	
2012	Kaizoku Sentai Gokaiger vs. Space Sheriff Gavan: The Movie	Blue Buster (voice)	
2012	Fujimi Orchestra	Cop	
2012	Kamen Rider × Super Sentai: Super Hero Taisen	Ryuji Iwasaki / Blue Buster	
2012	Tokumei Sentai Go-Busters the Movie: Protect the Tokyo Enetower!	Ryuji Iwasaki / Blue Buster	
2013	Hanako-san	Tatsuya Saeki	
2013	Tokumei Sentai Go-Busters vs. Kaizoku Sentai Gokaiger: The Movie	Ryuji Iwasaki / Blue Buster	
2013	Kamen Rider × Super Sentai × Space Sheriff: Super Hero Taisen Z	Ryuji Iwasaki / Blue Buster	
2013	Tokumei Sentai Go-Busters Returns vs. Doubutsu Sentai Go-Busters	Ryuji Iwasaki / Blue Buster / Blue Gorilla	
2014	Zyuden Sentai Kyoryuger vs. Go-Busters: The Great Dinosaur Battle! Farewell Our Eternal Friends	Ryuji Iwasaki / Blue Buster	
2014	Uchuu Keiji Sharivan NEXT GENERATION	Seigi	
2017	Alley Cat	Kengo Hashimoto	
2018	Futari no Uketorinin		
2022	Nagisa ni Saku Hana		
