= Kyosuke Hamao =

Japanese former actor, singer, and model (born 1991)

- 浜尾 京介
- Born: Kyosuke Hamao (濱尾 京介, Hamao Kyōsuke); June 25, 1991 (age 35); Tokyo, Japan
- Education: Parsons School of Design
- Occupations: Actor; singer; model
- Years active: 2007–2014
- Agent: Tani Promotion (2005-2014)
- Notable work: Musical: The Prince of Tennis as Eiji Kikumaru; Takumi-kun Series as Takumi Hayama; Tensou Sentai Goseiger as Agri/Gosei Black
- Height: 177 cm (5 ft 10 in)
- Musical career
- Genres: J-pop
- Instrument: Vocals
- Label: Marvelous AQL
- Website: www.kyosukehamao.store

Kyosuke Hamao (浜尾 京介, Hamao Kyōsuke; also spelled Kyousuke Hamao, born June 25, 1991) is a Japanese former actor, singer, and model. Hamao debuted as an actor in the role of Eiji Kikumaru in Musical: The Prince of Tennis from 2007 to 2009. He has since then appeared in multiple film and television projects, such as Takumi Hayama in the Takumi-kun film adaptations and Agri/Gosei Black in Tensou Sentai Goseiger. In addition to his acting career, Hamao has released the songs "Kimi o Mitsuketai" and "Shine", along with his 2011 debut studio album, 7 Colors.

In 2013, Hamao announced that he was retiring from the entertainment industry at the end of February 2014. Since his retirement, he has been working as a photographer.

== Career ==
=== Acting career ===
At the age of 16, Hamao was cast as Eiji Kikumaru in Musical: The Prince of Tennis in 2007, who he played until 2009. In 2008, he appeared in his first television role on Gokusen 3. From 2009, Hamao starred in the Takumi-kun Series: Niji-iro no Glass film adaptation as Takumi Hayama.

In 2010, Hamao was cast as Agri/Gosei Black in Tensou Sentai Goseiger. After the series' run, he continued to appear as the character in other Super Sentai series. Hamao also reprised his role in the Takumi-kun film adaptations until the fifth film, Takumi-kun Series: Ano, Hareta Aozora, after which he announced that he was leaving the project.

On October 25, 2013, Hamao announced on his Niconico live-stream that he was retiring from acting at the end of February 2014. In November 2013, he posted on his blog that he was planning on pursuing interior design. In a 2016 blog post, Hamao reaffirmed that he had no intentions of returning to the entertainment industry.

=== Music career ===
Throughout his career, Hamao briefly pursued singing and released music through the label Marvelous AQL. He released his debut single, "Kimi o Mitsuketai", on August 5, 2009. On May 25, 2011, he released both his second single "Shine" and debut studio album, 7 Colors, on an independent record label.

== Personal life ==
After retiring from the entertainment industry, Hamao studied at Parsons School of Design from 2015 to 2021. In 2024, through an interview with Ricoh, Hamao revealed that he is working as a freelance photographer.

== Discography ==
=== Studio albums ===
Title	Year	Details	Peak chart positions	Sales
Title	Year	Details	JPN	Sales
7 Colors	2011	Released: May 25, 2011; Label: —; Format: CD; Track listing: 1. "Hajimaru Asa" (始まる朝); 2. "Beyond"; 3. "Big Bright Sky"; 4. "Awake"; 5. "Kyōhansha" (共犯者); 6. "Moongrow"; 7. "Extra Name"; 8. "My Funeral Rehearsal"	—	—
"—" denotes releases that did not chart or were not released in that region.

=== Singles ===
Title	Year	Peak chart positions	Sales	Album
Title	Year	JPN	Sales	Album
"Kimi o Mitsuketai" (君を見つけたい)	2009	161	—	Non-album single
"Shine"	2011	—	—	Non-album single
"—" denotes releases that did not chart or were not released in that region.

== Filmography ==
=== Television ===
Year	Title	Role	Network	Note
2008	Gokusen 3	Kyosuke Terauchi	NTV	Recurring role
2009	Ore-tachi wa Tenshi da! No Angel No Luck		TV Tokyo	Episode 6
2010	Tensou Sentai Goseiger	Agri/Gosei Black	TV Asahi	Lead role

=== Films ===
- Gokusen Movie (2009) as Kyosuke Terauchi
- Takumi-kun Series 2: Nijiiro no Garasu (2009) as Takumi Hayama
- Takumi-kun Series 3: Bibou no Detail (2010) as Takumi Hayama
- Takumi-kun Series 4: Pure (2010) as Takumi Hayama
- Takumi-kun Series 5: Ano, Hareta Aozora (2011) as Takumi Hayama
- Samurai Sentai Shinkenger vs. Go-onger: GinmakuBang!! Agri/Gosei Black (voice only)
- Tensou Sentai Goseiger: Epic on the Movie (2010) as Agri/Gosei Black
- Tensou Sentai Goseiger vs. Shinkenger: Epic on Ginmaku (2011) as Agri/Gosei Black
- Gokaiger Goseiger Super Sentai 199 Hero Great Battle (2011) as Agri/Gosei Black
- Gal Basara: Sengoku Jidai wa Kengai Desu (2011) as Youhei
- Joshidaisei Kaiki Club (2012)
- Musashino-sen no Shimai (2012)
- Messiah Movie (2013) as Shiba Shuusuke
- Our Kogen Hotel/Bokutachi no Kogen Hotel (2013) as Ayumu Aizawa
- Kujira no Ita Natsu (2014)
- Fumoukaigi - A Barren Conference (2014)
- Taekwondo Damashii: Rebirth (2014)
- Gakuen no Kuroba (2014) as Natsume sensei

=== DVD ===
- Frame17 (2008)
- Maokore 2009: Kimi ni Yell o (2009)
- Sugao no Kyosuke (2010)

=== Theatre ===
- The Prince of Tennis Musical: The Progressive Match Higa Chuu feat. Rikkai (In Winter of 2007-2008)
- The Prince of Tennis Musical: Dream Live 5th (2008)
- The Prince of Tennis Musical: The Imperial Presence Hyotei Gakuen feat. Higa Chuu (2008)
- The Prince of Tennis Musical: The Treasure Match Shitenhouji feat. Hyotei Gakuen (2008–2009)
- The Prince of Tennis Musical: Dream Live 6th (2009)
- Peacemaker (2011) as Souji Okita
- Angel Eyes (2011)
- Sengoku Basara 3 (2011) as Chosokabe Motochika
- Working!! (2012) as Souta Takanashi
- The Prince of a Wonderful Town (2012)
- The Prince of a Wonderful Town - Chapter 2 (2013)
- Messiah Stage (2013) as Shiba Shuusuke
- Fumoukaigi - A Barren Conference (2014)

== Publications ==
=== Photo books ===
Year	Title	Publisher	ISBN
2010	Mao Travel (マオトラ～mao travel～)	Wani Books	ISBN 978-4-8470-4307-9
