= Yukihiro Takiguchi =

Japanese actor (1985–2019)

- 滝口幸広
- Yukihiro Takiguchi on November 11, 2019
- Born: May 29, 1985; Chiba Prefecture, Japan
- Died: November 13, 2019 (aged 34); Tokyo, Japan
- Occupations: Actor; singer
- Years active: 2004–2019
- Employer: Stardust Promotion (2004–2019)
- Known for: Musical: The Prince of Tennis; Kamen Rider Drive
- Height: 179 cm (5 ft 10 in)
- Musical career
- Genres: J-pop
- Instrument: Vocals
- Formerly of: PureBoys
- Website: www.stardust.co.jp/section3/profile/takiguchiyukihiro.html

Yukihiro Takiguchi (滝口 幸広, Takiguchi Yukihiro; May 29, 1985 – November 13, 2019) was a Japanese actor, singer, and model affiliated with Stardust Promotion. After modeling in various campaigns, he made his acting debut in the 2004 television series Water Boys 2 and later appeared as Fumizō Sōma from Tadashii Ōji no Tsukurikata, Shōzō Akaike from the Takumi-kun film adaptation series, and Akira Hayase from Kamen Rider Drive.

In addition to television and film projects, Takiguchi has appeared in multiple stage plays. He played Shuichiro Oishi in Musical: The Prince of Tennis (2006). After leaving production, Takiguchi played the roles of Yūzō Kashima in Mankai Stage: A3! and Miroku in InuYasha. In addition to acting, Takiguchi was part of the project boy band PureBoys from 2007 to 2008.

== Career ==
Takiguchi attended an all-boys high school, and, during his senior year, he was scouted to become a model. Takiguchi accepted the offer, after concluding that the job would be more rewarding than "graduating out of college to become a salaryman." He was signed on to Stardust Promotion in Section 3. In 2004, he debuted as an actor in the television series Water Boys 2.

From 2006 to 2007, Takiguchi played Shuichiro Oishi in Musical: The Prince of Tennis. In June 2007, Takiguchi became a member of the project group PureBoys. In March 2008, he announced he was leaving the group and continued to make appearances on their online show until June 27, 2008.

His final appearance before his death was in the musical Seishun Aoharu Tetsudō, which ended its run on November 4, 2019.

== Personal life ==
Takiguchi's father is a chef. In December 2008, Takiguchi became a certified chef.

== Death ==
Takiguchi died from heart failure on November 13, 2019, at the age of 34. Prior to his death, Takiguchi had been preparing to appear in the stage plays Meijiza no Hen: Kirin ni No-ru in December 2019 and Mankai Stage: A3! August 2020 in January 2020. Takiguchi's funeral was held privately with close relatives.

== Discography ==
=== Soundtrack appearances ===
Title	Year	Peak chart positions	Sales	Album
Title	Year	JPN	Sales	Album
"Shinpi no Rasen" (神秘の螺旋)	2008	—	—	Haruka: Beyond the Stream of Time 4: Amesora no Sho
"—" denotes releases that did not chart or were not released in that region.

== Filmography ==
=== TV series ===
Year	Title	Role	Other notes
2004	Water Boys 2	Toba	Episode 12
2005	Chakushin Ari	Honda Tetsuya	Episode 01
2005	Mahou Sentai Magiranger	Takayaki-san	Episode 39
2006	Unfair	Seta Tooru	Episode 01
2007	Koisuru Nichiyoubi		
2007	Asakusa Fukumaru Ryokan		Episode 07
2007	Omo☆San		April 25/29 and May 2/6
2008	Tadashii Ōji no Tsukurikata	Fumizō Sōma	Lead
2008	Bomb-bee Men (Binbou Danshi)	Abe	
2008	Tokyo Ghost Trip	Ryū Inui	
2008	Gokusen 3		Episode 08
2008–2009	Pochitama	regular	
2009	Atashi-tachi no Momoiro Nikki—Cappucino ~Otouto no Tomodachi~	Jun	Episode 05, March 30
2009	Koishite Akuma	Vampire (episode 1)	
2009	Buzzer Beat		Episode 07
2010	Arienai		Episode 07(?)
2011	Sengoku Danshi	Date masamune, Main Role	Episode 26
2012	Haisukuru Kagekidan Otokogumi	Kiryu Akira	
2013	Nekketsu Kōha Kunio-kun	Riki, Main Role	Episode 17
2014	Kamen Rider Drive	Akira Hayase	
2015	Taikomochi no Tatsujin	Teruhiko Jinguji	Episode 12
2015	Platinum Age		
2017	The World Yamizukan	Unspecified role	Voice in anime
2017	Silver Soul / Gintama		

=== Theatre ===
Year	Title	Role	Notes
2005	Kurotokage		
2006	Shokyū Kyōshitsu		Lead role
2006–2007	Musical: The Prince of Tennis	Shuichiro Oishi	
2007	PureBOYS 7Cheers! ~ Tobe! Jibun to iu Daichi Kara	Kōta Tsukiura	
2008	Oishii Timing		
2008	Typhoon No. 14 Monshiro	Shōta	
2009	Boukensha-tachi	Shichirō	
2009	*pnish* produce vol.5 Reverse Historica		
2009	Koroshiya Syuu ~Shoot Me~		
2010	Byakkotai The Idol		
2010	Boukensha-tachi (saien)	Shichirō	
2011	*pnish* produce Panic Cafe		
2011	Kōrin Fight	Sanada Yukimura	
2011	Peacemaker Kurogane	Tatsunosuke Ichimura	
2011	Letter		
2017	InuYasha	Miroku	
2018	Mankai Stage: A3! Spring & Summer 2018	Yūzō Kashima	
2018	Mankai Stage: A3! Autumn & Winter 2019	Yūzō Kashima	
2019	Seishun Aoharu Tetsudō	Seibu Chichibu Line	

=== Movies ===
Year	Title	Role	Other notes
2007	Water	Ryouun	BL, shown only in cinemas
2007	Yoshimoto Director's 100: Akatsuki ni Shi, Dakishimete	Lead role	
2007	Takumi-kun Series: Soshite Harukaze ni Sasayaite	Shōzō Akaike	
2009	Ani to Boku no Fuufugenka		
2009	Takumi-kun Series: Niji-iro no Glass	Shōzō Akaike	
2009	Ikemen Bank The Movie		
2010	Takumi-kun Series: Bibō no Detail	Shōzō Akaike	
2010	Tsuki to Uso to Satsujin	Okudera Kousuke	
2011	Takumi-kun Series: Pure	Shōzō Akaike	BL
2011	Gangsta		Film by Fuyuki Shindo
2011	Takumi-kun Series: Ano, Hareta Aozora	Shōzō Akaike	BL
2014	Kamen Rider Drive Episode 0: Countdown To Global Freeze	Akira Hayase	
2015	Seven Days: Friday – Sunday		
2015	Seven Days: Monday – Thursday		
2019	A.I. Tantei		Released posthumously

=== Radio/Webcast ===
Year	Title	Date	Other notes
2007	Pure☆Radio	August 4	With the PureBOYS
2007	Yahoo! Live Talk「Natsu no Owari no IKEMEN NIGHT」	September 3	With Takagi Shinpei, Ono Kento, Yuuki Jutta
2007	ENTERMAX	October 11	TOKYO-FM
2007–2008	Harajuku Amesuta☆Gakuen	every Friday, 7pm Japan Time	With the PureBOYS
2008	Excella presents Omotesandou Cafe 「T-TIME」	January 8	Odoroku TV
2008	Energy Premium Pure☆Factory	January 7 and 14	Energy 701; With Katou Keisuke
2011	Heat-up Eve	every other Tuesday	NicoVideo; With Hamao Kyousuke and Furukawa Yuuta

=== PVs ===
Year	Title	Artist
2005	Garden	FLOW
2009	eternal~towanin	JEMSTONE
2009	Loving You...	Miyawaki Shion
