= List of Engine Sentai Go-onger characters =

Engine Sentai Go-onger (炎神戦隊ゴーオンジャー, Enjin Sentai Gōonjā) is a Japanese tokusatsu series that serves as the 32nd installment in the Super Sentai franchise and the 20th entry in the Heisei era. The series follows the titular team in their battles against the Gaiark Clan, who have conquered several Braneworlds and now seek to do the same to the Human World.

== Main characters ==
=== Go-ongers ===
The main heroes of Engine Sentai Go-onger. From left to right: Hiroto and Miu Sutō, Hanto Jō, Renn Kōsaka, Sōsuke Esumi, Saki Rōyama, and Gunpei Ishihara.

The eponymous Go-ongers are a team of five humans partnered with inhabitants of the Braneworld of Machine World called Engines based in an RV called the Ginjiro-go (ギンジロー号, Ginjirō-gō). Their arsenal revolves around a series of Soul (ソウル, Sōru) microchips, such as Change Souls (チェンジソウル, Chenji Sōru) that allow them to transform and Engine Souls (炎神ソウル, Enjin Sōru) that hold the Engines' souls. While transformed, each member carries a Mantan Gun (マンタンガン, Mantan Gan) (Note: The name comes from the Japanese phrase for "fill 'er up" (満タン, mantan).) sidearm, which can switch between Gun Mode (ガンモード, Gan Mōdo) and Rod Mode (ロッドモード, Roddo Mōdo), and wield unique Go-on Gear (ゴーオンギア, Gōon Gia) weapons. Later in the series, they acquire the Kankan Bar (カンカンバー, Kankan Bā) (Note: "Kan kan" (カンカン, Kankan) is a Japanese mimetic word for a clanging noise, like that of a crossing gate's.) club, which can combine with a Mantan Gun to form the Kankan Mantan Gun (カンカンマンタンガン, Kankan Mantan Gan) and use in conjunction with the Ancient Engines' Souls to scrap human-sized Barbaric Machine Beasts.

The primary members composed of Sōsuke, Renn, and Saki utilize blue-colored Change Souls in conjunction with Go-Phones (ゴーフォン, Gōfon) to transform. By combining their personal Go-on Gear, they form the Highway Buster (ハイウェイバスター, Haiwei Basutā) and use it in conjunction with one of their partners' Engine Souls to scrap human-sized Barbaric Machine Beasts. They can also use the secondary Go-ongers' personal Go-on Gear and the Go-on Wings' Rocket Daggers to perform the Go-on Bond Spirits (ゴーオンキズナスピリッツ, Gōon Kizuna Supirittsu) attack.

The secondary members composed of Hanto and Gunpei utilize green-colored Change Souls in conjunction with Shift Changer (シフトチェンジャー, Shifuto Chenjā) bracelets to transform. By combining their personal Go-on Gear, they form the Junction Rifle (ジャンクションライフル, Jankushon Raifuru), which can further combine with the primary Go-ongers' Highway Buster to form the Super Highway Buster (スーパーハイウェイバスター, Sūpā Haiwei Basutā), and use it in conjunction with one of their partners or Carrigator's Engine Souls to scrap human-sized Barbaric Machine Beasts.

During the events of the crossover film Engine Sentai Go-onger vs. Gekiranger, after losing their Engine Souls, the Go-ongers learn the Engine Fist (炎神拳, Enjinken) fighting style to compensate for the brief loss of their partners and gain the ability to perform the Super-Super Special Highway Buster (超超スペシャルハイウェイバスター, Chō Chō Supesharu Haiwei Basutā) finisher.

==== Sōsuke Esumi ====
Sōsuke Esumi (江角 走輔, Esumi Sōsuke), nicknamed the "Speed King", was a former race car driver who possesses a sunny disposition and was known amongst his racing team as "Miracle Esumi" for his belief in miracles. Unyielding to the point of obstinacy and confident to a fault, he confronts all obstacles without hesitation and is highly protective of his teammates. Following the Gaiark's defeat, Sōsuke returns to racing, albeit as a go-kart driver.

Sōsuke can transform into Go-on Red (ゴーオンレッド, Gōon Reddo). While transformed, he wields the Road Saber (ロードサーベル, Rōdo Sāberu), which allows him to perform the Saber Straight (サーベルストレート, Sāberu Sutorēto) attack. During the events of the crossover film Engine Sentai Go-onger vs. Gekiranger, he learns the Engine Fist moves Geki Speedor Saber Straight (ゲキスピードルサーベルストレート, Geki Supīdoru Sāberu Sutorēto) and Drrr-Drrr Bullet (ドルドル弾, Doru Doru Dan). With Geki Red and Rio, he can perform the Geki-Rin Engine Bullet (激臨炎神弾, Gekirin Enjin Dan) attack.

During the events of the crossover film Samurai Sentai Shinkenger vs. Go-onger: GinmakuBang!!, Sōsuke uses Shinken Red's Dinosaur Disk in conjunction with his Mantan Gun to transform into Hyper Go-on Red (ハイパーゴーオンレッド, Haipā Gōon Reddo) where the aforementioned sidearm's Rod Mode gains similar capabilities as the Kyoryumaru.

Sōsuke Esumi is portrayed by Yasuhisa Furuhara (古原 靖久, Furuhara Yasuhisa). As a child, Sōsuke is portrayed by Hiroto Terui (照井 宙斗, Terui Hiroto).

==== Renn Kōsaka ====
Renn Kōsaka (香坂 連, Kōsaka Ren), nicknamed the "Cyclopedia" for his attention to the smallest detail and "mother" (オカン, okan) for his doting personality and cooking expertise, is the Go-ongers' talkative second-in-command and chief technician who formerly worked as a bus driver. Over the course of the series, he builds or fine-tunes many of the Go-ongers' weaponry and helps the Engines combine into stronger forms. Following the Gaiark's defeat, Renn becomes Sōsuke's mechanic in the go-kart racing circuit.

Renn can transform into Go-on Blue (ゴーオンブルー, Gōon Burū). While transformed, he wields the Garage Launcher (ガレージランチャー, Garēji Ranchā), which allows him to perform the Launcher Starter (ランチャースターター, Ranchā Sutātā) attack. During the events of the crossover film Engine Sentai Go-onger vs. Gekiranger, he learns the Engine Fist move On-on Bullet (オンオン弾, On'on Dan).

Renn Kōsaka is portrayed by Shinwa Kataoka (片岡 信和, Kataoka Shinwa). As a child, Renn is portrayed by Shunpei Ijuin (伊集院 竣平, Ijūin Shunpei).

==== Saki Rōyama ====
Saki Rōyama (楼山 早輝, Rōyama Saki), nicknamed the "Sweet Angel", was a concessions vendor who worked the stands of the Twin Ring Motegi racetrack and is known for her cheerful, eager personality, which stemmed from an encounter with a woodland spirit who taught her to always "smile, smile". Amidst the Go-ongers' fight with the Gaiark, Saki briefly breaks off from her teammates to form the G3 Princess (G３プリンセス, Jī Surī Purinsesu) and Go-on Princess (ゴーオンプリンセス, Gōon Purinsesu) idol groups to defeat a separate foe on two separate occasions. Following the Gaiark's defeat, Saki goes on to fulfill her dream of opening a cake shop.

Saki can transform into Go-on Yellow (ゴーオンイエロー, Gōon Ierō). While transformed, she wields the Racing Bullet (レーシングバレット, Rēshingu Baretto), which allows her to perform the Bullet Crash (バレットクラッシュ, Baretto Kurasshu) attack. During the events of the crossover film Engine Sentai Go-onger vs. Gekiranger, she learns the Engine Fist move V-V Bullet (ブイブイ弾, Bui Bui Dan).

Saki Rōyama is portrayed by Rina Aizawa (逢沢 りな, Aizawa Rina). As a child, Saki is portrayed by Asumi Kikuchi (菊池 和澄, Kikuchi Asumi).

==== Hanto Jō ====
Hanto Jō (城 範人, Jō Hanto), nicknamed the "Vagabond", is an enthusiastic, kind-hearted, but immature freeter working part-time at the Doki Doki Pizzeria who became a Go-onger after helping Gunpei return the original Go-ongers' Engine Casts. Following Gaiark's defeat, Hanto resumes working at the Doki Doki Pizzeria.

Hanto can transform into Go-on Green (ゴーオングリーン, Gōon Gurīn). While transformed, he wields the Bridge Axe (ブリッジアックス, Burijji Akkusu), which allows him to perform the Axe Tooling (アックスツーリング, Akkusu Tsūringu) attack. During the events of the crossover film Engine Sentai Go-onger vs. Gekiranger, he learns the Engine Fist move Bir-Bir Bullet (バルバル弾, Baru Baru Dan).

Hanto Jō is portrayed by Masahiro Usui (碓井 将大, Usui Masahiro).

==== Gunpei Ishihara ====
Gunpei Ishihara (石原 軍平, Ishihara Gunpei), nicknamed the "Chaser", is an insecure and buffoonish former police officer with excellent marksmanship and a passion for justice who tries to put on a cool and serious front. After witnessing the original Go-ongers during their initial battles with Gaiark, Gunpei quits the police force after they refuse to help. Upon discovering the Go-ongers' identities, he goes to extreme lengths to join them, going so far as to kidnap their ally, Bomper, and steal their Engine Casts. Upon learning of how they were chosen, Gunpei returns the Engine Casts and becomes a Go-onger. Following the Gaiark's defeat, Gunpei returns to the police force and becomes a detective.

Gunpei can transform into Go-on Black (ゴーオンブラック, Gōon Burakku). While transformed, he wields the Cowl Laser (カウルレーザー, Kauru Rēzā), which allows him to perform the Laser Highbeam (レーザーハイビーム, Rēzā Haibīmu) attack. During the events of the crossover film Engine Sentai Go-onger vs. Gekiranger, he learns the Engine Fist move Ganga Ganga Bullet (ガンガガンガ弾, Ganga Ganga Dan).

Gunpei Ishihara is portrayed by Kenji Ebisawa (海老澤 健次, Ebisawa Kenji).

=== Go-on Wings ===
The Go-on Wings (ゴーオンウイングス, Gōon Uingusu) are an elite two-man fighting force composed of the Sutō siblings, who came from a Plutocratic lifestyle. They were chosen by the rare Wing Race (ウイング族, Uingu Zoku) of Engines because of their esper abilities and brought to Machine World to become the Go-on Wings under Jum-bowhale's guidance before the Go-ongers came to be. Due to their training, they initially view the Go-ongers as too inexperienced to protect Earth until Jum-bowhale teaches the pair about what truly makes them Go-ongers, leading to the Sutō siblings becoming their allies. Following Gaiark's defeat, they resume their familial duties as members of high class society, though Hiroto was reluctant to do so.

Utilizing red-colored Change Souls in conjunction with Wing Triggers (ウイングトリガー, Uingu Torigā), the Sutō siblings can transform into the Go-on Wings. While transformed, each member carries a Rocket Dagger (ロケットダガー, Roketto Dagā) (Note: Following the Akihabara massacre, the toy version of the Rocket Dagger was renamed the "Switch Jet Sword Rocket Booster" (スイッチ噴射剣ロケットブースター, Suitchi Funshaken Roketto Būsutā).) sidearm, which allows them to fly via the Jet Dagger (ジェットダガー, Jetto Dagā) function and perform varying Dagger (ダガー, Dagā) attacks, such as the Lightning Dagger (ライトニングダガー, Raitoningu Dagā), the Shining Dagger (シャイニングダガー, Shainingu Dagā), and the Shooting Dagger (シューティングダガー, Shūtingu Dagā). By combining their Wing Triggers and Rocket Daggers, they form Wing Booster (ウイングブースター, Uingu Būsutā) firearms and use them in conjunction with their partners' Engine Souls to scrap human-sized Barbaric Machine Beasts.

During the events of the crossover film Engine Sentai Go-onger vs. Gekiranger, the Sutō siblings use the Geki Jūken Beast Arts fighting style they learned at a young age from Gorie Yen to assist Master Xia Fu in temporarily reviving Rio and Mele.

==== Hiroto Sutō ====
Hiroto Sutō (須塔 大翔, Sutō Hiroto), nicknamed the "Philosopher", is the cool and aloof leader of the Go-on Wings who is proficient in combat. He trains extensively in boxing and kickboxing, and possesses an esper ability that allows him to sense nearby danger. Despite his cold exterior, he possesses a fiery passion and a willingness to put his life on the line to protect those he cares about. Due to this, he became known as the Go-ongers' father figure.

Hiroto can transform into Go-on Gold (ゴーオンゴールド, Gōon Gōrudo). While transformed, he primarily uses the Rocket Dagger to perform the Burning Dagger (バーニングダガー, Bāningu Dagā) attack.

Hiroto Sutō is portrayed by Hidenori Tokuyama (徳山 秀典, Tokuyama Hidenori). As a child, Hiroto is portrayed by Shogo Ehara (江原 省吾, Ehara Shōgo).

==== Miu Sutō ====
Miu Sutō (須塔 美羽, Sutō Miu), nicknamed the "Lovely Sensation", is Hiroto's younger sister with a "princessy" attitude, skill in aikido, and an esper ability that allows her to see things through the flowers she tends to. She displays an over-dependence on her brother, who she refers to as "ani", (Note: "Ani" is a shortened form of "aniki", the Japanese honorific expression for "older brother" or "partner".) along with a desire to improve those she perceives as lesser than her. Over the course of the series, she develops a close friendship with Saki and a hesitant crush on Sōsuke. Additionally, she temporarily breaks off from Hiroto to form the G3 Princess and Go-on Princess idol groups to defeat a separate foe on two separate occasions.

Miu can transform into Go-on Silver (ゴーオンシルバー, Gōon Shirubā). While transformed, she primarily uses the Rocket Dagger to perform the Freezing Dagger (フリージングダガー, Furījingu Dagā) attack.

Miu Sutō is portrayed by Yumi Sugimoto (杉本 有美, Sugimoto Yumi). As a child, Miu is portrayed by Airi Yoshida (吉田 愛里, Yoshida Airi).

=== Engines ===
The Engines (炎神, Enjin) are the Go-ongers' mecha and denizens of Machine World who pursued the Gaiark Clan to the Human World. Due to being unable to maintain their true giant sizes for longer than 10 minutes without suffering from fatal rusting, they are forced to separate their Engine Souls from their Engine Casts (炎神キャスト, Enjin Kyasuto) and choose the Go-ongers to assist them in keeping both safe. Through their bonds with their partners, the Engines are able to combine into stronger humanoid giant robot forms.

With the Shinkengers' Origami, the Engines can perform the Modikara Cannonball (モヂカラキャノンボール, Mojikara Kyanonbōru) attack.

1. Engine Speedor (炎神スピードル, Enjin Supīdoru): Go-on Red's race car/condor-themed partner who forms the arms, head, and upper torso of Engine-Oh. While in his true size, he possesses incredible speed and an "Accel Full Throttle" mode, which allows him to glide and use his talons, and can perform the Speedor Burst (スピードルバースト, Supīdoru Bāsuto) attack. Speedor is voiced by Daisuke Namikawa (浪川 大輔, Namikawa Daisuke).
2. Engine Bus-on (炎神バスオン, Enjin Basuon): Go-on Blue's bus/lion-themed partner who forms the hips and legs of Engine-Oh. While in his true size, he possesses incredible strength and Bus-on Missiles (バスオンミサイル, Basuon Misairu). Bus-on is voiced by Hisao Egawa (江川 央生, Egawa Hisao).
3. Engine BearRV (炎神ベアールＶ（ブイ）, Enjin Beārubui): Go-on Yellow's 4WD vehicle/bear-themed gutsy and spunky partner who forms the midsection of Engine-Oh. While in her true size, she possesses V V Missiles (ブイブイミサイル, Bui Bui Misairu) and can perform the BearR Attack (ベアールアタック, Beāru Atakku) and BearR Press (ベアールプレス, Beāru Puresu) attacks. As a member of Go-on Princess, she can perform the Princess Triple Attack and Princess Triple Punch alongside her fellow members. BearRV is voiced by Miki Inoue (井上 美紀, Inoue Miki).
4. Engine Birca (炎神バルカ, Enjin Baruka): Go-on Green's motorcycle/orca-themed easy-going partner who forms the left arm of GunBirOh. While in his true size, he possesses the Bircutter (バルカッター, Barukattā) tail. He displays a fondness for foreign words, having used Spanish, Italian, French, English, and Mandarin Chinese terms throughout the series. Birca is voiced by Sōichirō Hoshi (保志 総一朗, Hoshi Sōichirō).
5. Engine Gunpherd (炎神ガンパード, Enjin Ganpādo): Go-on Black's police car/German Shepherd-themed justice seeking partner who forms the right arm of GunBirOh. While in his true size, he possesses the Gunpherd Gun (ガンパードガン, Ganpādo Gan) nose. Gunpherd is voiced by Kenji Hamada (浜田 賢二, Hamada Kenji).
6. Engine Carrigator (炎神キャリゲーター, Enjin Kyarigētā): A semi-trailer truck/alligator-themed member of the powerful Gian Race (ジャイアン族, Jaian Zoku) of Engines who forms the head, torso, and legs of GunBirOh. While in his true size, he can carry two Engines on his back. He displays a samurai-esque personality and does not require a partner, though he requires the most time to recharge his Engine Soul. Carrigator is voiced by Kyousei Tsukui (津久井 教生, Tsukui Kyōsei).
7. Engine Toripter (炎神トリプター, Enjin Toriputā): Go-on Gold's helicopter/rooster-themed lively partner and a member of the Wing Race who forms the right arm of SeikuOh. While in his true size, he possesses rotor blades and turrets loaded with an infinite supply of energy bullets that allow him to perform the Toripter Batariot (トリプターバタリオット, Toriputā Batariotto) attack. Toripter is voiced by Shizuka Ishikawa (石川 静, Ishikawa Shizuka).
8. Engine Jetras (炎神ジェットラス, Enjin Jettorasu): Go-on Silver's fighter jet/tiger-themed calm partner and a member of the Wing Race who forms the left arm of SeikuOh. While in his true size, he possesses Jetras Torahawk (ジェットラストラホーク, Jettorasu Torahōku) cruise missiles and can perform the Jetras Phantom (ジェットラスファントム, Jettorasu Fantomu) attack. Jetras is voiced by Kiyotaka Furushima (古島 清孝, Furushima Kiyotaka).
9. Engine Jum-bowhale (炎神ジャン・ボエール, Enjin Janboēru): A Boeing 747/baleen whale-themed veteran member and leader of the Wing Race who forms the head, torso, and legs of SeikuOh. While in his true size, he possesses a flying wing-like Jet Mode (ジェットモード, Jetto Mōdo) for increased speed and can perform the Bowhale Beam (ボエールビーム, Boēru Bīmu) attack. Jum-bowhale is voiced by Tomomichi Nishimura (西村 知道, Nishimura Tomomichi).
10. Engine Kishamoth (炎神キシャモス, Enjin Kishamosu): A steam locomotive/mammoth-themed peaceful member of the Ancient Engines (古代炎神, Kodai Enjin) who forms the head, torso, and arms of KyoretsuOh. While in his true size, he can perform the Ice Age Express (アイスエイジエクスプレス, Aisu Eiji Ekusupuresu) attack. He is incapable of speaking human languages due to arriving in the Human World, then called Dino World (ダイナワールド, Daina Wārudo), during the Mesozoic to battle the Horonderthal before going into hibernation and reawakening in the present.
11. Engine Tyrain (炎神ティライン, Enjin Tirain): A Shinkansen/Tyrannosaurus-themed primitive member of the Ancient Engines who forms the right leg of KyoretsuOh. He is also incapable of speaking human languages and displays an intense hatred for the Savage Machine Clans.
12. Engine Cerain (炎神ケライン, Enjin Kerain): A Shinkansen/Triceratops-themed member of the Ancient Engines who forms the left leg of KyoretsuOh. He is also incapable of speaking human languages and specializes in breaking through enemy defenses with his horns.

==== Engine Combinations ====
The Engines can be assembled into giant robots via Engine Combination (炎神合体, Enjin Gattai). In combinations piloted by all five Go-ongers, they reconfigure their Handle Blaster (ハンドルブラスター, Handoru Burasutā) control systems from Handle Mode (ハンドルモード, Handoru Mōdo) to Blaster Mode (ブラスターモード, Burasutā Mōdo) and use them in conjunction with Blaster Souls (ブラスターソウル, Burasutā Sōru) to perform the corresponding giant robot's Grand Prix (グランプリ, Guran Puri) finisher.

- EngineOh (エンジンオー, Enjin'ō): The Go-ongers' first giant robot, nicknamed the "Giant King of Engines" (巨大なる炎神の王, Kyodai naru Enjin no Ō), composed of Engines Speedor, Bus-on, and BearRV that wields the Go-on Sword (ゴーオンソード, Gōon Sōdo) and the V Shield (Vシールド, Bui Shīrudo). Its finisher is the Go-on Grand Prix (ゴーオングランプリ, Gōon Guran Puri). Additionally, EngineOh can combine with other Engines through Engine Armaments (炎神武装, Enjin Busō), which are as follows:
  - EngineOh Birca (エンジンオーバルカ, Enjin'ō Baruka): A combination of EngineOh and Engine Birca. Its finisher is the Bircutter Slash (バルカッタースラッシュ, Barukattā Surasshu).
  - EngineOh Gunpherd (エンジンオーガンパード, Enjin'ō Ganpādo): A combination of EngineOh and Engine Gunpherd. Its finisher is the Gunpherd Gunfire (ガンパードガンファイヤー, Ganpādo Ganfaiyā).
  - EngineOh Jetripter (エンジンオージェットリプター, Enjin'ō Jettoriputā): A combination of EngineOh and Engines Toripter and Jetras. Its finisher is the Jetori Bullseye (ジェットリブルズアイ, Jettori Buruzuai).
  - EngineOh Jetras (エンジンオージェットラス, Enjin'ō Jettorasu): A combination of EngineOh and Engine Jetras. Its finisher is the Go-On Bullseye (ゴーオンブルズアイ, Gōon Burūzuai).
- GunBirOh (ガンバルオー, Ganbaruō): The Go-ongers' second giant robot, nicknamed the "Another King of Engines" (さらなる炎神の王, Sara naru Enjin no Ō), composed of Engines Birca, Gunpherd, and Carrigator that can perform the Bircutter Storm (バルカッターストーム, Barukattā Sutōmu) and Bircutter Wrist Return (バルカッター小手返し, Barukattā Kote Gaeshi) attacks. Its finisher is the GunBir Grand Prix (ガンバルグランプリ, Ganbaru Guran Puri). Like EngineOh, GunBirOh can combine with other Engines through Engine Armaments, which are as follows:
  - GunBirOh Toripter (ガンバルオートリプター, Ganbaruō Toriputā): A combination of Engines Gunpherd, Carrigator, and Toripter. Its finisher is the Toripgun Batariot (トリプガンバタリオット, Toripugan Batariotto).
  - GunBirOh Jetras (ガンバルオージェットラス, Ganbaruō Jettorasu): A combination of Engines Birca, Carrigator, and Jetras. Its finisher is the Trabircutter Slash (トラバルカッタースラッシュ, Torabarukattā Surasshu).
- EngineOh G6 (エンジンオーG6, Enjin'ō Jī Shikkusu): A combination of EngineOh and GunBirOh that can perform the G6 Kick (G６キック, Jī Shikkusu Kikku) attack. Its finisher is the G6 Grand Prix (G６グランプリ, Jī Shikkusu Guran Puri).
- SeikuOh (セイクウオー, Seikūō): (Note: "SeikuOh" (セイクウオー, Seikūō) comes from the Japanese word seikū (制空, "air superiority").) The Go-on Wings' personal giant robot, nicknamed the "Sky Punching Aerial King" (空を制する天空の王, Sora o Seisuru Tenkū no Ō), composed of the Wing Race Engines that can perform the Toripcutter (トリプカッター, Toripukattā), Jetras Boomerang (ジェットラスブーメラン, Jettorasu Būmeran), Jetori Turbulence (ジェットリタービュランス, Jettori Tābyuransu), and Seiku Sonic (セイクウソニック, Seikū Sonikku) attacks. Its finisher is the Seiku Impulse (セイクウインパルス, Seikū Inparusu). Like EngineOh and GunBirOh, SeikuOh can combine with other Engines through Engine Armaments, which are as follows:
  - SeikuOh Birca (セイクウオーバルカ, Seikūō Baruka): A combination of Engines Birca, Jetras, and Jum-bowhale. Its finisher is the Birtras Torahawk (バルトラストラホーク, Barutorasu Torahōku).
  - SeikuOh Gunpherd (セイクウオーガンパード, Seikūō Ganpādo): A combination of Engines Gunpherd, Toripter, and Jum-bowhale. Its finisher is the Guntori Gunfire (ガントリーガンファイヤー, Gantorī Ganfaiyā).
- EngineOh G9 (エンジンオーG9, Enjin'ō Jī Nain): A combination of EngineOh, GunBirOh, and SeikuOh. Its finisher is the G9 Grand Prix (G９グランプリ, Jī Nain Guran Puri).
- KyoretsuOh (キョウレツオー, Kyōretsuō): (Note: "KyoretsuOh" comes from the Japanese words for kyōryū (恐竜, "dinosaur") and ressha (列車, "train"). Additionally, the contraction of the two words is a homophone of the word for "intense" (強烈, kyōretsu).) The Go-ongers' third giant robot, nicknamed the "Powerful King of Trains" (強大な列車の王, Kyōdai na Ressha no Ō), composed of the Ancient Engines that can perform the Railway Chop (電車道チョップ, Denshamichi Choppu), Dinosaur Kick (ダイナソーキック, Dainasō Kikku), Kyoretsu Dino Bite (キョウレツダイナバイト, Kyōretsu Daina Baito), and KishamoSteam (キシャモスチーム, Kishamosuchīmu) attacks. Its finisher is the Kyoretsu Express (キョウレツエクスプレス, Kyōretsu Ekusupuresu).
- EngineOh G12 (エンジンオーG12, Enjin'ō Jī Tuerubu): A combination of all the Engines, nicknamed the "Ultimate King Who Triumphs Over Evil" (全ての悪を制する究極の王, Subete no Aku o Seisuru Kyūkyoku no Ō), that can perform the G12 Punch (G12パンチ, Jī Tuerubu Panchi) and G12 Kick (G12キック, Jī Tuerubu Kikku) attacks. Its finisher is the G12 {Final) Grand Prix (G12 (ファイナル) グランプリ, Jī Tuerubu (Fainaru) Guran Puri). During the events of the crossover film Engine Sentai Go-onger vs. Gekiranger, EngineOh G12 performs the Engine Beast Grand Prix (炎神ビーストグランプリ, Enjin Bīsuto Guran Puri) finisher alongside the Gekirangers' mecha SaiDaiGekiRinTohja.
- Samurai Formation 23 (サムライフォーメーション23, Samurai Fōmēshon Tuentisurī): A formation in which EngineOh G9, KyoretsuOh, ShinkenOh, DaiKaiOh, and MouGyuDaiOh use the IkaTenku Buster to perform the Samurai Engine Super Grand Release (侍・炎神・スーパー大開砲, Samurai Enjin Sūpā Daikaihō) finisher. This formation appears exclusively in the crossover film Samurai Sentai Shinkenger vs. Go-onger: GinmakuBang!!.
- EngineOh G7 (エンジンオーG7, Enjin'ō Jī Sebun): The Miracle Engine Combination (ミラクル炎神合体, Mirakuru Enjin Gattai) of EngineOh and Engines Birca, Gunpherd, Toripter, and Jetras. Its finisher is the 10 Years Grand Prix (10 Years グランプリ, Ten Iyāzu Guran Puri). This combination appears exclusively in the anniversary film Engine Sentai Go-onger: 10 Years Grand Prix.
- Byunbyum Mach Robo Go-on Custom (ビュンビュンマッハーロボ ゴーオンカスタム, Byunbyun Mahhā Robo Gōon Kasutamu): A combination of Byunbyum Mach and Engine Speedor that wields the Bakuage Charger. Its finisher is the Byunbyum Grand Prix Finish (ビュンビュングランプリフィニッシュ, Byunbyun Guran Puri Finisshu). This combination appears exclusively in Bakuage Sentai Boonboomger.

=== Go-Roader GT ===
Armored Wheel Go-Roader GT (装甲車輪ゴローダーGＴ, Sōkō Sharin Gorōdā Jī Tī) (Note: "Go-Roader GT" comes from the Japanese phrase gorogoro (ゴロゴロ, "rolling about").) is a wheel-like robot created by Hiroto and Jum-bowhale. Starting out in a palm-sized Wheel Mode (ホイールモード, Hoīru Mōdo), it can enlarge and transform into the humanoid Action Mode (アクションモード, Akushon Mōdo) via the Tokon Soul (トーコンソウル, Tōkon Sōru), (Note: The name comes from the Japanese phrase for "fighting spirit" (闘魂, tōkon).) which Renn developed. In Action Mode, it can perform the Go-Roader Kick (ゴローダーキック, Gorōdā Kikku) and the Go-Roader Strike (ゴローダーストライク, Gorōdā Sutoraiku) attacks. In a human-sized Wheel Mode, it can perform the Go-Roader Attack (ゴローダーアタック, Gorōdā Attaku) finisher. Additionally, the Engines' Souls are compatible with the Go-Roader GT, allowing them to effectively assume a humanoid form. However, doing so will drain their Engine Souls of energy.

== Recurring characters ==
=== Bomper ===
Bomper (ボンパー, Bonpā), short for "Born-to Outerdimension and Mechanic × Pitcrew-type ENGINE-support Robot", is a pink radar robot from Machine World who was created by Jum-bowhale and supports the Go-ongers by creating their arsenal and performing maintenance on the Engines.

Bomper is voiced by Akiko Nakagawa (中川 亜紀子, Nakagawa Akiko).

=== Gaiark ===
The Barbaric Machine Clan Gaiark (蛮機族ガイアーク, Bankizoku Gaiāku), (Note: Also spelt as Barbaric Machine Aristocrat Gaiark.) (Note: "Gaiark" comes from the Japanese word for "harm" (害悪, gaiaku).) are machine-men from the Machine World who seek to pollute the Braneworlds and whose numbers were scattered during their war with the Engines.

==== Pollution Ministers ====
Originally thought to be the last of the Gaiark, the three Pollution Ministers end up on Earth to pollute it to serve as an ideal paradise for them and based themselves at Hellgailles Palace (ヘルガイユ宮殿, Herugaiyu Kyūden), which is powered by the Deus Haguru Magear (デウス・ハグル・マギア, Deusu Haguru Magia), an inexhaustible energy source that Yogostein brought with him from Machine World. Amidst their battle with Yogoshimacritein, the Go-ongers destroy the gear, causing Hellgailles Palace to self-destruct. During the events of the crossover film Samurai Sentai Shinkenger vs. Go-onger: GinmakuBang!!, the Pollution Ministers are rebuilt, but choose not to continue the Gaiark Clan's plans and run off to the bottom of the Sanzu River. As of the events of the anniversary film Engine Sentai Go-onger: 10 Years Grand Prix, the ministers settle down in Junk World, but accidentally give rise to the Zontark Clan and join forces with the Go-ongers to stop them.

===== Yogostein =====
Land Pollution Minister Yogostein (害地大臣ヨゴシュタイン, Gaichi Daijin Yogoshutain), (Note: Yogostein's name comes from the Japanese word yogosu (汚す, "to soil").) short for Baron Yogorex de Stein (バロン・ヨゴレックス・ド・シュタイン, Baron Yogorekkusu do Shutain), is a serious-minded pumpjack/Roman soldier-themed general who leads the Gaiark's Land Pollution Barbaric Machine Beasts and wields the Yogospear (ヨゴシュピア, Yogoshupia). After suffering a string of failures amidst his battles against the Go-ongers and losing his vice-minister, Hiramechimedes, whom he had total faith in, Yogostein goes into self-imposed exile to mourn and find himself before returning to personally seek violent revenge against the Go-ongers. Desiring the Horonderthal Clan's power, he awakens one of its members, lets the Go-ongers scrap it, and uses its parts to upgrade himself into the Horonderthal King in a failed attempt to kill Go-on Red and rust all of Japan. Despite his newfound power, he is weakened by EngineOh G12 and scrapped by Go-on Red in a final duel.

Yogostein is voiced by Kiyoyuki Yanada (梁田 清之, Yanada Kiyoyuki), who also voices Yogoshimacritein.

===== Kitaneydas =====
Air Pollution Minister Kitaneydas (害気大臣キタネイダス, Gaiki Daijin Kitaneidasu) (Note: Kitaneydas' name comes from the Japanese word for "filthy" (汚い, kitanai).) is the factory-themed leader of the Gaiark's Air Pollution Barbaric Machine Beasts who wields the Kitaneybar (キタネイバー, Kitaneibā), can transform into smog, and perform the Air Pollution Attack (害気アタック, Gaiki Attaku). Amidst the Gaiark's war with the Engines, he experimented with Bikkurium's potent properties before using it on the Barbaric Machine Beasts. He arrives in the Human World with Yogostein and Kegalesia, but following the former's death, Yogoshimacritein's arrival, and being reduced to a living shield, a frustrated Kitaneydas and Kegalesia destroy the Bottomless Wastebin to weaken Yogoshimacritein, who scraps them in retaliation.

Kitaneydas is voiced by Mitsuaki Madono (真殿 光昭, Madono Mitsuaki).

===== Kegalesia =====
Water Pollution Minister Kegalesia (害水大臣ケガレシア, Gaisui Daijin Kegareshia) (Note: Kegalesia's name comes from on the Japanese word kegareru (汚れる, "to get dirty").) is the tap-themed leader of the Water Pollution Barbaric Machine Beasts who wields the Kegastick (ケガスティック, Kegasutikku), possesses regenerating artificial human-like skin, and can shoot steam from pipes on her back whenever she gets angry, which can cause her to enlarge if excess steam is produced. Amidst the Gaiark's fight with the Go-ongers, Kegalesia briefly breaks off from her fellow ministers to form the G3 Princess idol group to defeat a separate foe. Following Yogostein's death and Yogoshimacritein reducing her to a living shield, Kegalesia leads the Go-ongers to the Deus Haguru Magear before helping Kitaneydas destroy the Bottomless Wastebin to weaken Yogoshimacritein, who scraps them in retaliation.

Due to her nature as a Water Pollution branch member, she can perform the Water Pollution Fusion (害水合身, Gaisui Gasshin) technique with any member of the same branch to boost both parties' power.

During the events of Engine Sentai Go-onger: 10 Years Grand Prix, amidst the Pollution Ministers' efforts to stop the Zontark Clan, Kegalesia borrows Go-on Yellow's transformation equipment and briefly transforms into Kega Yellow (ケガイエロー, Kega Ierō).

Kegalesia is portrayed by Nao Oikawa (及川 奈央, Oikawa Nao).

==== Hiramechimedes ====
Land Pollution Vice-Minister Hiramechimedes (害地副大臣ヒラメキメデス, Gaichi Fukudaijin Hiramekimedesu) (Note: Hiramechimedes' name is a combination of the Japanese word hirameki (閃き, "flash; brilliance") and "Archimedes" (アルキメデス, Arukimedesu).) is Yogostein's mathematician/instrumentation-themed subordinate and the Gaiark's top tactical genius. Originally a second-rate inventor who developed much of the Gaiark's arsenal, he plotted to assassinate Yogostein and take his position. However, the latter recognized the former's brilliance and awarded him with the yardstick-like Hacalibur (ハカリバー, Hakaribā) sword and promoted him to Vice-Minister. This caused Hiramechimedes to loyally devote himself to Yogostein's cause and he would go on to inspire fear in the Engines after achieving numerous victories.

On the day the Gaiark were expelled from Machine World, Hiramechimedes disappeared to mount a failed attack on the Wing Race before resurfacing in the Human World months later to serve under Yogostein once more. When the Wing Race Engines pursue him and gain help from the Go-on Wings, Hiramechimedes stages his banishment from the Gaiark in a plot to deceive the Go-ongers and kill Go-on Gold. When the heroes foil him, an ashamed Hiramechimedes refuses to return to Yogostein and spends several days calculating a new plan to kill the Go-ongers. Eventually concluding he needs raw power instead of his intellect, he sneaks back into the Hellgailles Palace and infuses himself with one hundred times the Bikkurium required for a regular Barbaric Machine Beast to undergo an Industrial Revolution. However, the stress of his upgrade breaks his mind as he undergoes a "Big Industrial Revolution" and transforms into the insane Detaramedes (デタラメデス, Detaramedesu). (Note: Detaramedes' name comes from Archimedes and the Japanese word detarame (出鱈目, "nonsense").) He overpowers the Go-ongers, but is eventually scrapped by Go-on Red.

Despite this, his grudge against the Go-ongers keeps him from passing on. Unable to retake physical form and referring to himself as Urameshimedes (ウラメシメデス, Urameshimedesu), (Note: Urameshimedes' name comes from Archimedes and the Japanese word urameshii (恨めしい, "grudge").) he travels to the Braneworld of Samurai World, possesses a monstrous inhabitant named Bakki, and transforms further into Hirameki Bakki (ヒラメキ伐鬼, Hirameki Bakki) to take revenge on the Go-ongers, only to be exorcised by them.

Hiramechimedes is voiced by Kazuya Nakai.

==== Yogoshimacritein ====
Crime Minister Yogoshimacritein (総裏大臣ヨゴシマクリタイン, Sōridaijin Yogoshimakuritain) (Note: Yogoshimacritein's name comes from the Japanese word yogoshimakuru (汚しまくる, "to pollute").) is the Gaiark's prime minister/industrial machinery-themed Insurgent Highness (デンカノボウトウ, Denka no Bōtō) and Yogostein's father who wields a two-headed Kanabō-like weapon. As the most ruthless member of the Gaiark Clan, he desired to rule over all of the Braneworlds, having oversaw the near-extinction of the Engines' Gian Race and the destruction of three Braneworlds. After Kireizky arrives in the Human World, Yogoshimacritein uses the former's Bottomless Wastebin to enter the Human World himself and use it to power his Justice Dissolution (正義解散, Seigi Kaisan) attack, which can convert targets into wavelengths so long as the Deus Haguru Magear is active. When he uses his Puppet Regime (傀儡傀儡政権, Kugutsu Kairaiseiken) ability to turn Kitaneydas and Kegalesia into his puppets and reveals his willingness to sacrifice them, the Pollution Ministers assist the Go-ongers in destroying the Bottomless Wastebin and the Deus Haguru Magear to weaken Yogoshimacritein. He destroys his traitorous subordinates and uses the Third Industrial Revolution (第三次産業革命, Daisanji Sangyō Kakumei) ability to enlarge himself, but is scrapped by EngineOh G12.

Yogoshimacritein is voiced by Kiyoyuki Yanada, who also voices Yogostein.

==== Other members ====
- Barbaric Machine Clan Arelunbra Family (蛮機族アレルンブラ家, Bankizoku Arerunbura-ke): Preceding the Gaiark as the Engines' mortal enemies, the Arelunbra Family were sea-based androids who terrorized Machine World with their Water Pollution Machine Knights (害水機士, Gaisui Kishi) before their leader Nigorl left for the Human World and the Arelunbra faded into legend.
  - Water Pollution Machine Knight Uzumaquixote (害水機士ウズマキホーテ, Gaisui Kishi Uzumakihōte): (Note: Uzumaquixote is named after the Japanese word uzumaki (渦巻, "spiral" and "whirlpool") and Don Quixote (ドン・キホーテ, Don Kihōte).) A servant of Nigorl who wields a jousting lance and shield with the ability to consume anything. After arriving in the Human World with Nigorl, Uzumaquixote became exposed to its clean surroundings, miniaturized, and trapped as a stone statue that a young Renn would find, assuming it to be a Ksitigarbha (地蔵, Jizō) statue. In the present, the Gaiark and Go-on Wings discover and fight over the statue until Kegalesia revives Uzumaquixote and has him attack the Go-ongers. After ingesting Bikkurium and enlarging himself, Uzumaquixote is scrapped by SeikuOh, GunBirOh, and EngineOh. Uzumaquixote is voiced by Naomi Kusumi (楠見 尚己, Kusumi Naomi).
  - Water Pollution Prince Nigorl zo Arelunbra (害水王子ニゴール・ゾ・アレルンブラ, Gaisui Ōji Nigōru zo Arerunbura): (Note: His name comes from the Japanese word nigoru (濁る, "to get impure").) The prince of the Arelunbra who wields the Nigorl Rapier (ニゴールレイピア, Nigōru Reipia), possesses mastery in fencing, and the ability to summon rain clouds. Unlike other Gaiark members, he displays a liking towards things he considers beautiful. After pining for and being spurned by Kegalesia, he arrived in the Human World, but entered suspended animation. The Gaiark revive Nigorl in the present, who turns his affections towards BearRV and attempts to marry her. Using his Water Pollution Fusion ability, he enlarges himself without Bikkurium and forcibly interfaces with Kegalesia to transform into Mix Kegalegorl (ミックス・ケガレゴール, Mikkusu Kegaregōru), with Kegalesia as a battery to increase his power. Despite this, he is defeated by the Go-ongers and left to die by Kegalesia. Nigorl is voiced by Kenji Nojima (野島 健児, Nojima Kenji).
- Barbaric Machine Clan Horonderthal (蛮機族ホロンデルタール, Bankizoku Horonderutāru): (Note: Their name comes from the Japanese word for "extinct" (滅ぶ, horobu) and "Neanderthal" (ネアンデルタール, Neanderutāru).) A clan of ancient, giant clockwork Savage Machine Beasts that caused the extinction of the dinosaurs on Earth 65 million years ago with their violence-inducing Horonden Wave (ホロンデン波, Horondenpa) attack. The Ancient Engines battled the Horonderthal until they and an individual clan member were fossilized within a mountain. In the present, Yogostein seeks out the Horonderthal and eventually succeeds despite freeing the Ancient Engines as well. After Yogostein upgrades the Horonderthal with modern Gaiark technology, it defeats the Ancient Engines, but is scrapped by EngineOh G12 while Yogostein claims the Horonderthal's power for himself.
- Cleaning Minister Kireizky (掃治大臣キレイズキー, Sōji Daijin Kireizukī): (Note: Kireizky's name comes from the Japanese word kireizuki (綺麗好き, "tidiness").) A Gaiark minister who "cleans" the slate of Braneworlds he has visited to acquire a special form of energy called Dokkirium (ドッキリウム, Dokkiriumu). He wields Seven Cleaning Tools (オソウジ七つ道具, Osōji Nanatsu Dōgu): the Duster Blade (ハタキブレード, Hataki Burēdo), the Broom Shotgun (ホウキショットガン, Hōki Shottogan), the Anti-Soul Rag (アンチソウルゾーキン, Anchi Sōru Zōkin), which can be wrung out into the Rag Grenade (ゾウキングレネード, Zōkin Gurenēdo), the Dustpan Shield (チリトリシールド, Chiritori Shīrudo), the Cotton Swab Kunai (メンボークナイ, Menbō Kunai), the Bottomless Wastebin (ムゲンゴミバコ, Mugen Gomibako), and the Bucket Bazooka (バケツバズーカ, Baketsu Bazūka). After destroying the Braneworlds of Sound World, Magic World, and Prism World (プリズムワールド, Purizumu Wārudo) as part of his quest, he arrives in the Human World to battle the Go-ongers until he loses his Wastebin. He ingests the Dokkirium he had collected and undergoes a Super Industrial Revolution (超産業革命, Chōsangyō Kakumei) to overpower the Go-ongers and Engines, but they form EngineOh G12 to defeat Kireizky. However, the Wastebin would later allow Yogoshimacritein to enter the Human World. Kireizky is voiced by Eiji Takemoto (竹本 英史, Takemoto Eiji).
- Danger Cabinet-Director Chirakasonne (危官房長官チラカソーネ, Kikanbō Chōkan Chirakasōne): (Note: Chirakasonne's name comes from the Japanese word chirakasu (散らかす, "to litter").) Yogoshimacritein's boiler-themed right-hand and practitioner of the Natural Litter Constitution Kenpō (天地羅苛死憲法, Tenchirakashi Kenpō) fighting style. Chirakasonne ingests Dokkirium and enlarges, but is scrapped by GunBirOh. Chirakasonne is voiced by Bin Shimada (島田 敏, Shimada Bin).

==== Arsenal ====
- Barbaric Machine Soldiers Ugatts (蛮機兵ウガッツ, Bankihei Ugattsu): (Note: "Ugatts" comes from the Japanese word for "dig" (穿つ, ugatsu).) Android foot soldiers built to support the Barbaric Machine Beasts and pilot the Barbaric Dohmas. Additionally, Nigorl possesses a feminine variant called Beauty Ugatts (ビューティウガッツ, Byūti Ugattsu), which are stronger than regular Ugatts. During the events of the crossover film Samurai Sentai Shinkenger vs. Go-onger: GinmakuBang!!, Batcheed uses Ugatts capable of transforming into motorcycles.
- Barbaric Dohma (蛮ドーマ, Bandōma): Cave cricket-like jet fighters invented by Hiramechimedes that can assume a frog-like walking mode.
  - Barbaric Dohma SP (Special) (蛮ドーマSP, Bandōma Supesharu): Cave cricket and mantis-like jet fighters that serve as Hiramechimedes and the Pollution Minsters' personal transports that are each able to carry up to four Barbaric Dohma.

==== Barbaric Machine Beasts ====
The Barbaric Machine Beasts (蛮機獣, Bankijū) are monsters created by the Pollution Ministers to pollute the Earth and are, as such, usually divided into four types: Order Land Pollution (害地目, Gaichi-moku), Order Water Pollution (害水目, Gaisui-moku), Order Air Pollution (害気目, Gaiki-moku), and Order Land/Water/Air Special (害地水気スペシャル目, Gaichisuiki Supesharu-moku). The Barbaric Machine Beasts are infused with a special energy called Bikkurium (ビックリウム, Bikkuriumu) that is capable of enlarging them in a process called Industrial Revolution (産業革命, Sangyō Kakumei) and are based on machines or inventions that were present at the turn of the twentieth century. If they are scrapped, the dead Barbaric Machine Beasts shrink back to normal size and end up at the Barbaric Machine Beast Graveyard. In the film Engine Sentai Go-onger: Boom Boom! Bang Bang! GekijōBang!!, Yogostein takes advantage of this by developing the Barbaric Machine Beast program to use Ugatts souls to reanimate the Barbaric Machine Beasts into the Recycled Barbaric Machine Beast Army (リサイクル蛮機獣軍団, Risaikuru Bankijū Gundan), only for them to be re-scrapped by the Engines due to being much weaker than they used to be.

===== Land Pollution Barbaric Machine Beasts =====
- Scoop Banki (スコップバンキ, Sukoppu Banki): A shovel-themed Barbaric Machine Beast equipped with a pair of shovel-like gauntlets. He is sent by Yogostein to attack Neo Tokyo Hills, only to be defeated by the Go-ongers. Scoop Banki enlarges, but is scrapped by EngineOh. Scoop Banki is voiced by Tamotsu Nishiwaki (西脇 保, Nishiwaki Tamotsu).
- Jishaku Banki (ジシャクバンキ): A magnet-themed Barbaric Machine Beast capable of manipulating electromagnetic forces. He is sent by Yogostein to attack the Go-ongers, who manage to defeat him. Following this, Jishaku Banki is upgraded into the electromagnet-themed Denjishaku Banki (デンジシャクバンキ, Denjishaku Banki) and uses his increased power to overwhelm the Go-ongers until Go-on Green destroys his power source. Denjishaku Banki enlarges, but is scrapped by EngineOh Birca. Jishaku and Denjishaku Banki are voiced by Toshiharu Sakurai (桜井 敏治, Sakurai Toshiharu).
- Boring Banki (ボーリングバンキ, Bōringu Banki): A boring machine-themed Barbaric Machine Beast sent by Yogostein to destroy Japan by extracting magma, only to be defeated by the Go-ongers. Boring Banki enlarges, but is scrapped by EngineOh and GunBirOh. Boring Banki is voiced by Naoki Imamura (今村 直樹, Imamura Naoki).
- Hatsuden Banki (ハツデンバンキ): An electric generator-themed Barbaric Machine Beast who possesses electrokinesis. Following a mishap wherein he accidentally switches bodies with Go-on Red before the Go-ongers reverse the process, Hatsuden Banki enlarges, but is weakened by a cold that Go-on Red was suffering from and scrapped by EngineOh G6. Hatsuden Banki is voiced by Nobuyuki Hiyama (檜山 修之, Hiyama Nobuyuki).
- Happa Banki (ハッパバンキ): (Note: Happa Banki's name comes from the Japanese word for "rock blasting" (発破, happa).) A dynamite-themed Barbaric Machine Beast and Yogostein's "number one hooligan" with destructive capabilities. Yogostein sends him to destroy the city, but is foiled by the Go-on Wings. Despite receiving help from Yogostein and Hiramechimedes, Happa Banki is scrapped by Go-on Gold, who takes his Bikkurium to prevent him from enlarging. Happa Banki is voiced by Masaharu Satō (佐藤 正治, Satō Masaharu).
- Nokogiri Banki (ノコギリバンキ): A saw-themed Barbaric Machine Beast equipped with a saw blade arm capable of cutting through any material. He is sent by Yogostein to attack the city, but he focuses on attacking objects that are taller than him instead until the Go-ongers exploit the loose bolt holding his saw arm together. Nokogiri Banki enlarges, but is scrapped by EngineOh G6. Following this, Hiramechimedes collects his remains, rebuilds him into the stronger Chainsaw Banki (チェーンソーバンキ, Chēnsō Banki) to remove his weaknesses, and tasks him with attacking the Go-ongers and Go-on Wings while polluting the skies. However, Jum-bowhale thwarts Chainsaw Banki's plans. The latter enlarges, but is scrapped by SeikuOh. Nokogiri and Chainsaw Banki are voiced by Takayuki Godai (五代 高之, Godai Takayuki).
- Bōseki Banki (ボーセキバンキ): A spinning mule-themed Barbaric Machine Beast capable of firing streams of yarn to immobilize targets. She is tasked by Yogostein with aiding Hiramechimedes in staging a false attempt on his life. After undergoing an "Original Industrial Revolution" (元祖産業革命, Ganso Sangyō Kakumei) however, she is scrapped by EngineOh G9. Bōseki Banki is voiced by Rica Matsumoto (松本 梨香, Matsumoto Rika).
- Hammer Banki (ハンマーバンキ, Hanmā Banki): A namesake-themed Barbaric Machine Beast that Yogostein infused with his hatred. As a result, the former is compelled to destroy everything in sight, to the point of disobeying Yogostein. Hammer Banki enlarges, but is scrapped by EngineOh G9 and the Go-Roader GT. Hammer Banki is voiced by Riki Kitazawa (北沢 力, Kitazawa Riki).
- Drill Banki (ドリルバンキ, Doriru Banki): A namesake-themed Barbaric Machine Beast and the strongest of the Savage Land models who wields a drill horn. He is sent by Yogostein to locate the Horonderthal, only to accidentally awaken the Ancient Engines. Drill Banki enlarges, but is scrapped by KyoretsuOh. Drill Banki is voiced by Chihiro Suzuki (鈴木 千尋, Suzuki Chihiro).

===== Air Pollution Barbaric Machine Beasts =====
- Shoukyaku Banki (ショウキャクバンキ, Shōkyaku Banki): An incinerator-themed Barbaric Machine Beast capable of placing objects in his forehead furnace and converting it into smog for use in his attacks, with flowers and any objects he considers pretty improving the smog's toxicity. He is sent by Kitaneydas to use his abilities on Japan, but is foiled by the Go-ongers, forcibly enlarged by the Pollution Ministers, and scrapped by EngineOh. Shoukyaku Banki is voiced by Takashi Nagasako (長嶝 高士, Nagasako Takashi).
- Speaker Banki (スピーカーバンキ, Supīkā Banki): A namesake-themed Barbaric Machine Beast capable of converting beautiful sound waves into noise pollution with his microphone spear before producing the resulting sound waves from his speakers. After receiving an upgrade that allows him to generate a sound barrier capable of blocking most attacks, Speaker Banki enlarges, only to be scrapped by EngineOh Gunpherd. Speaker Banki is voiced by Issei Futamata (二又 一成, Futamata Issei).
- Lens Banki (レンズバンキ, Renzu Banki): A camera lens-themed Barbaric Machine Beast capable of teleporting targets to the Braneworld of Junk World and using the Braneworld's ability to mechanize people. Kitaneydas creates Lens Banki to assist in his plan to create new Ugatts. Despite enlarging and being scrapped by EngineOh and GunBirOh, Lens Banki takes pictures of the mecha, which the Pollution Ministers incorporate into Kagami Banki. Lens Banki is voiced by Kōichi Tōchika (遠近 孝一, Tōchika Kōichi).
- Antenna Banki (アンテナバンキ, Antena Banki): A namesake-themed Barbaric Machine Beast capable of firing lasers and interfering with television signals and replacing them with his own hypnotic signals capable of forcing people to pollute their surroundings. He is sent by Kitaneydas to drive the Go-ongers apart, only to be thwarted by the latter. Antenna Banki enlarges, but is scrapped by GunBirOh. Antenna Banki is voiced by Hideaki Kusaka (日下 秀昭, Kusaka Hideaki).
- Vacuum Banki (バキュームバンキ, Bakyūmu Banki): A vacuum cleaner-themed Barbaric Machine Beast. He is sent by Kitaneydas to kill the Go-on Wings, only to be defeated by them and Go-on Red. Vacuum Banki enlarges, but is scrapped by EngineOh Jetripter. Vacuum Banki is voiced by Taiki Matsuno (松野 太紀, Matsuno Taiki).
- Fūsen Banki (フーセンバンキ): A balloon-themed Barbaric Machine Beast nicknamed the "Tiger of Balloons" who possesses a rubbery body that makes him immune to physical attacks, the ability to inflate targets, and weaponized smog-filled balloons. He is sent by Kitaneydas to distribute his balloons to children, but the Go-on Wings foil his plot. Fūsen Banki enlarges, but is scrapped by SeikuOh. Fūsen Banki is voiced by Ippei Hara (原 一平, Hara Ippei).
- Dowsing Banki (ダウジングバンキ, Daujingu Banki): A dowsing rod-themed Barbaric Machine Beast who wields a pair of tonfa that double as dowsing rods. She is sent by Kitaneydas to locate an object that landed in the mountains and distract the Go-ongers while he uses the object to bury the Human World in trash. She enlarges, but is scrapped by EngineOh G9. Dowsing Banki is voiced by Harumi Edo (エド・はるみ, Edo Harumi).
- Heater Banki (ヒーターバンキ, Hītā Banki): A namesake-themed Barbaric Machine Beast who wields the Burning Coil (灼熱コイル, Shakunetsu Koiru) batons. He is sent by Kitaneydas to cause heat waves and target Japan's gas tanks, only to be foiled by the Go-ongers. Heater Banki enlarges, but is scrapped by KyoretsuOh. Heater Banki is voiced by Atsushi Imaruoka (伊丸岡 篤, Imaruoka Atsushi).
- Engine Banki (エンジンバンキ, Enjin Banki): A giant namesake/truck-themed Barbaric Machine Beast created to resemble EngineOh who possesses a trucker-esque personality and the ability to transform into a gas guzzling dekotora. He is sent by Kitaneydas to avenge Yogostein by polluting the Human World with his exhaust fumes. However, Engine Banki is shrunk by Go-on Gold and scrapped by Go-on Red. Engine Banki is voiced by Tetsu Inada (稲田 徹, Inada Tetsu).
- Yatai Banki (ヤタイバンキ): A namesake-themed Barbaric Machine Beast that Kitaneydas tasks with capturing children for the latter's plot to subjugate the world to endless festive fun before tasking him with capturing two boys from the Braneworld of Samurai World instead. Yatai Banki enlarges, but is scrapped by EngineOh, GunBirOh, and SeikuOh. Yatai Banki is voiced by Kōichi Sakaguchi (坂口 候一, Sakaguchi Kōichi).
- Dumbbell Banki (ダンベルバンキ, Danberu Banki): A namesake-themed Barbaric Machine Beast built to be the strongest of the Savage Sky models capable of polluting the air with carbon dioxide through his heavy breathing and aided by a pair of Ugatts who remotely operate his arms, which he cannot lift by himself. He enlarges, but is scrapped by SeikuOh and the Go-Roader GT. Dumbbell Banki is voiced by Yūji Kishi (岸 祐二, Kishi Yūji).

===== Water Pollution Barbaric Machine Beasts =====
- Pipe Banki (パイプバンキ, Paipu Banki): A drainage pipe-themed Barbaric Machine Beast capable of producing sludge from his pipework body. Kegalesia sends him to test his powers at a dam before he enlarges to pollute Shindaiba, only for the latter to be scrapped by EngineOh. Pipe Banki is voiced by Takayuki Kondō (近藤 孝行, Kondō Takayuki).
- Spray Banki (スプレーバンキ, Supurē Banki): A clumsy yet overeager spray bottle-themed Barbaric Machine Beast capable of shooting acid from his mouth. He is sent by Kegalesia to steal Birca's Engine Cast, only to be wounded by his target and Gunpherd. Spray Banki enlarges, but is scrapped by EngineOh. Spray Banki is voiced by Antoki no Inoki (アントキの猪木).
- Bombe Banki (ボンベバンキ, Bonbe Banki): (Note: Bombe Banki's name comes from the German bombe.) A gas cylinder-themed Barbaric Machine Beast capable of firing a Red Rust Beam. Kegalesia sends him to eliminate EngineOh, but is thwarted by Carrigator. Refusing to give up, he allows himself to be defeated to enlarge and try again, only to be scrapped by GunBirOh. Bombe Banki is voiced by Masato Hirano (平野 正人, Hirano Masato).
- Hikigane Banki (ヒキガネバンキ): A trigger-themed Barbaric Machine Beast who is reputed to be the Gaiark Clan's top sniper. Kegalesia sends him to capture an alien girl named Būkorin and bring her back to her father Gego in exchange for weapons, only to be defeated by the Go-ongers. Hikigane Banki enlarges, but is scrapped by EngineOh G6. Hikigane Banki is voiced by Yasuaki Takumi (内匠 靖明, Takumi Yasuaki).
- Kama Banki (カマバンキ): A bath heater-themed Barbaric Machine Beast capable of shrinking and teleporting people to the miniature hot springs on his head via mist emitted from his nostrils. He is sent by Kegalesia to remove any interference to the Gaiark Clan's operations, during which he gains increased power after attaining enlightenment. Despite this, he is defeated by a love-filled Go-on Green. Kama Banki enlarges, but is scrapped by EngineOh G6. Kama Banki is voiced by Tamio Ōki (大木 民夫, Ōki Tamio).
- Oil Banki (オイルバンキ, Oiru Banki): A namesake-themed Barbaric Machine Beast capable of producing slippery oil slick that can incapacitate normal vehicles and the land-based Engines. After being defeated by Toripter and Jetras, Hiramechimedes gives Oil Banki wings to combat them. Despite enlarging, EngineOh and GunBirOh use giant mops to scrap Oil Banki. Oil Banki is voiced by Taketora (武虎).
- Manhole Banki (マンホールバンキ, Manhōru Banki): A manhole cover-themed Barbaric Machine Beast capable of moving at superhuman speed and shooting manhole covers. Kegalesia sends him to kidnap pen spinners as part of Kitaneydas' plan to power his Destructive Sound Machine and destroy the city. Manhole Banki enlarges, but is scrapped by EngineOh G9. Manhole Banki is voiced by Kentarō Itō (伊藤 健太郎, Itō Kentarō).
- Straw Banki (ストローバンキ, Sutorō Banki): A drinking straw-themed Barbaric Machine Beast capable of forcing targets to breathe out poisonous gas and three bottles that grant the ability to produce explosive soap bubbles, a smokescreen, and a bubble prison. Kegalesia develops a drink capable of enhancing his abilities and evil tendencies, but Straw Banki is defeated by Go-on Red and Speedor via the Go-Roader GT. Straw Banki enlarges, but is scrapped by BearRV, Bus-on, SeikuOh, and GunBirOh. Straw Banki is voiced by Yasuhiro Takato (高戸 靖広, Takato Yasuhiro).
- Shower Banki (シャワーバンキ, Shawā Banki): A namesake-themed Barbaric Machine Beast created by Kegalesia with the intention of producing acid rain, only to temporarily freeze men and sentient male organisms instead. Upon realizing what happened, Kegalesia gives Shower Banki "Super Ultra Gorgeous Acid Rain" and tasks her with killing the male Go-ongers, only for the latter to be defeated by Go-on Yellow, Silver, and BearRV via the Go-Roader GT. Shower Banki enlarges, but is scrapped by GunBirOh Jetras and SeikuOh Gunpherd. Shower Banki is voiced by Hiromi Tsuru (鶴 ひろみ, Tsuru Hiromi).
- Bin Banki (ビンバンキ): A weak bottle-themed Barbaric Machine Beast who can produce hot water. In light of his weakness, Kegalesia manipulates Manabu Yushima into upgrading Bin Banki into the magic-capable, thermos-themed Mahōbin Banki (マホービンバンキ). After being depowered and enlarging however, Mahōbin Banki is scrapped by KyoretsuOh. Bin and Mahōbin Banki are voiced by Wataru Takagi (高木 渉, Takagi Wataru).

===== Land/Water/Air Special Barbaric Machine Beasts =====
- Kagami Banki (カガミバンキ): A mirror-themed Barbaric Machine Beast created by all three Pollution Ministers who is capable of reflecting the Engines' attacks via Lens Banki's pictures. After being upgraded with extra Bikkurium and enlarging, Kagami Banki is scrapped by EngineOh G6. Kagami Banki is voiced by Junpei Morita (森田 順平, Morita Junpei).
- Kettei Banki (ケッテイバンキ; Definitive Banki): A draconic, chimeric Barbaric Machine Beast that Kitaneydas and Kegalesia modeled after all of its Barbaric Machine Beast predecessors, whose powers Kettei Banki is capable of using. Kettei Banki enlarges, but is scrapped by EngineOh, KyoretsuOh, and SeikuOh. Kettei Banki is voiced by Daisuke Gōri (郷里 大輔, Gōri Daisuke).

===== Other Barbaric Machine Beasts =====
- Mic Banki (マイクバンキ, Maiku Banki): A microphone-themed Air Pollution Barbaric Machine Beast who is scrapped by EngineOh and appears exclusively in the special drama sessions of the first Engine Sentai Go-onger soundtrack.
- Hedoro Banki (ヘドロバンキ): A sludge-themed Water Pollution Barbaric Machine Beast who is scrapped by EngineOh and GunBirOh and appears exclusively in the special drama sessions of the first Engine Sentai Go-onger soundtrack.
- Kussaku Banki (クッサクバンキ): An excavator-themed Land Pollution Barbaric Machine Beast who is scrapped by EngineOh G6 and appears exclusively in the Engine Sentai Go-onger tie-in manga.
- Okunote Banki (オクノテバンキ): (Note: Okunote Banki's name comes from the Japanese word for "trump" (奥の手, oku no te).) A Barbaric Machine Beast who appears exclusively in the stage show Aerial Warriors! The Go-on Wings Appear!! (天空の戦士！ゴーオンウイングス登場！！, Tenkū no Senshi! Gōon Uingusu Tōjō!!).
- Nunchaku Banki (ヌンチャクバンキ): A namesake-themed Land/Water/Air Special Barbaric Machine Beast created by Rin Jūken Akugata engineer Meka capable of performing Ringi fighting techniques. After receiving the Dōkokugan Soul, Nunchaku Banki gains increased power until he is defeated by Go-on Red and Geki Red and possessed by Long. Nunchaku Banki is voiced by Takahiro Yoshimizu (吉水 孝宏, Yoshimizu Takahiro).

== Guest characters ==
- Samurai World (サムライワールド, Samurai Wārudo): A Braneworld that resembles Feudal Japan and was under the dictatorship of Empress Maki and her Yōma until the Go-ongers end up in the Braneworld by accident and help overthrow her during the events of the film Engine Sentai Go-onger: Boom Boom! Bang Bang! GekijōBang!!. The Go-ongers would later learn that Samurai World contains doppelgangers of Human World inhabitants, with the corresponding pairs' souls being linked to each other.
  - Bakki (伐鬼（ばっき）): A deforestation-themed Yōma recruited by the spectral Urameshimedes to help him kill the Go-ongers in exchange for being allowed to destroy Human World's forests. Urameshimedes later possesses Bakki to fulfill his revenge, but the latter is killed by EngineOh G9.
  - Rairaiken (雷々剱) and Gokugokumaru (獄々丸): A pair of crimson Yōma and Maki's servants, the former a leonine monster who wields a kusarigama/kusarifundo-like weapon and the latter an ursine monster who wields sharp claws and a large shuriken. Following Maki's death, they pursue a pair of brothers from their world to the Human World to steal the Engine Sword and use Engine Dai-Shogun for evil. After the Go-ongers foil their plan, the Yōma ingest Bikkurium to perform their Fukoku Kyohei (富国強兵, Fukoku Kyōhei) enlargement technique, only to be killed by Engine Dai-Shogun. Rairaiken and Gokugokumaru are voiced by Naoya Uchida (内田 直哉, Uchida Naoya) and Masaya Matsukaze (松風 雅也, Matsukaze Masaya) respectively.
  - Harunosuke (晴之助) and Akinosuke (昭之助): Young brothers who came to the Human World to protect the Engine Sword. Harunosuke and Akinosuke are portrayed by Shohei Yamauchi (山内 翔平, Yamauchi Shōhei) and Hiroto Araki (荒木 博斗, Araki Hiroto) respectively.
- Osen (オーセン, Ōsen): (Note: Her name comes from the Japanese word osen (汚染, "pollution").) A tech-sorceress from Junk World (ジャンクワールド, Janku Wārudo), a Braneworld that resembles a junkyard due to an invention of Osen's that can multiply garbage and turns any organic into scrap metal. She travels to the Human World and assumes a human form after being deceived by Kitaneydas into thinking that her Braneworld was in danger of an invasion from the Human World and use her machine to give the Gaiark Clan an advantage. After meeting Hanto and seeing his kindness however, she reverses her machine's polarity and helps the Go-ongers defeat the Gaiark before returning to Junk World. Osen is portrayed by Hana Kino (木野 花, Kino Hana).
- Lumbiaco (ロムビアコ, Romubiako): An octopus-like monster from the Braneworld of Sound World (サウンドワールド, Saundo Wārudo) who comes to the Human World to feed on its noises, growing in size in the process. Due to the threat of it becoming large enough to crush Earth, the Go-ongers and Gaiark make repeated attempts to shrink it via a beautiful sound, only to fail until Saki, Miu, and Kegalesia form the G3 Princess idol group to destroy Lumbiaco.
- Wameikle (ワメイクル, Wameikuru): (Note: Wameikle's name comes from the Japanese word wameku (喚く, "to cry").) An amphibian-like monster from Stormy World (ストーミーワールド, Sutōmī Wārudo), a Braneworld bombarded by endless wind storms. After ending up in the Human World due to the Gaiark Clan's influence, Hiroto finds a Wameikle egg, with the hatching creature imprinting on him. Due to Gaiark attacks, the baby immediately grows into its adult form and goes on a rampage before using its high-pitched sonic cries to break the dimensional barrier between the Human World and Stormy World. Once Hiroto calms it down, Wameikle returns to its native Braneworld. Wameikle is voiced by Chika Sakamoto (坂本 千夏, Sakamoto Chika).
- Manabu Yushima (湯島 学, Yushima Manabu): An intelligent high school student who by chance found a Mage's Wand (魔法の杖, Mahō no Tsue) and its accompanying spell book, both of which came from Magic World (マジックワールド, Majikku Wārudo), a Braneworld that was home to many sorcerers until Kireizky destroyed it. After using his laptop to decipher the spell book and falling in love with Miu, Yushima attempts to win her over by magically infusing Bin Banki with magical powers. While working with Miu to de-power Bin Banki however, Yushima accidentally destroys his laptop. Manabu Yushima is portrayed by Ren Mori (森廉, Mori Ren).
- Santa Claus (サンタクロース, Santa Kurōsu): A being from Christmas World (クリスマスワールド, Kurisumasu Wārudo), a Braneworld where the holiday season is endless, everyone dresses like Santa, and are able to travel to other Braneworlds by train. Using the Different Dimension Present Bag (異次元プレゼント袋, Ijigen Purezento Bukuro) he carries with him, Santa can take out presents from Christmas World and bring them into other Braneworlds. Santa Claus is portrayed by Kinzo Sakura (桜 金造, Sakura Kinzō).

== Spin-off characters ==
- Empress Maki (女帝・魔姫, Jotei Maki): The heartless ruler of Samurai World who commands an army of Yōma to terrorize her Braneworld and appears exclusively in the film Engine Sentai Go-onger: Boom Boom! Bang Bang! GekijōBang!!. She attained her power after tricking the Honōshū into separating themselves from their Engine Casts, which she used to purge herself and Samurai World's denizens of all feelings except for rage and violence. However, the Go-ongers stumble onto her tyranny, with Go-on Red joining forces with the Honōshū to defeat her. In retaliation, she fuses herself with Retsu-Taka's Engine Cast to transform into a giant centipede-headed hydra until Go-on Red recovers the Engine Cast, forcing Maki into her true form before she is killed by Engine Dai-Shogun. Empress Maki is portrayed by Sonim (ソニン, Sonin).
  - Raiken (雷剱, Raiken) and Gokumaru (獄丸, Gokumaru): Two of Maki's strongest Yōma who were created from Shishi-no-Shin and Tsuki-no-Wa's respective Engine Casts and can assume vehicle forms as a result. Individually, Raiken is a blue leonine monster who wields a kusarigama/kusarifundo-like weapon while Gokumaru is a golden ursine monster who wields sharp claws and a large shuriken. The pair assist Maki in her tyranny until they are killed by Go-on Blue, Yellow, Green, Black, and the Go-on Wings. Raiken and Gokumaru are voiced by Naoya Uchida (内田 直哉, Uchida Naoya) and Masaya Matsukaze (松風 雅也, Matsukaze Masaya) respectively.
- Wandering Engines (流れ炎神, Nagare Enjin): Three Samurai World Engines and the counterparts of Engines Speedor, Bus-on, and BearRV who have lost their Engine Casts and hearts to Maki's magic and appear exclusively in the film Engine Sentai Go-onger: Boom Boom! Bang Bang! GekijōBang!!. In an attempt to gain the strength needed to fight back and restore themselves, their Engine Souls assumed human forms called Honōshū (炎衆; Flame People). After encountering the Go-ongers, the Honōshū successfully regain their Engine Casts and use the "Engine Entering Soul" (炎神入魂, Enjin Nyūkon) technique to merge into Engine Dai-Shogun (炎神大将軍, Enjin DaiShōgun), the Samurai World equivalent of the Go-ongers' EngineOh, where its wields the flaming Engine Sword (炎神剣, Enjinken). Its finisher is the Roaring Crimson Slash (轟音紅蓮斬り, Gōon Guren Giri). After defeating Maki however, the trio exhaust their energy, causing their Engine Souls to fade away while their Engine Casts turn to stone.
  - Retsu-Taka (烈鷹, Retsutaka; "Burning Falcon"): A young samurai and the leader of the Honōshū whose true form is Engine Retsu-Taka (炎神烈鷹, Enjin Retsutaka), Speedor's Samurai World counterpart. Prior to forming Engine Dai-Shogun, he transferred part of his Engine Soul into the Engine Sword and entrusted it to two brothers to ensure his Engine Cast can never be used for evil. Retsu-Taka is portrayed by Kento Handa (半田 健人, Handa Kento).
  - Shishi-no-Shin (獅子之進, Shishinoshin; "Moving Lion"): An older samurai who wields a naginata and whose true form is Engine Shishi-no-Shin (炎神獅子之進, Enjin Shishinoshin), Bus-on's Samurai World counterpart. Shishi-no-Shin is portrayed by Jyunichi Haruta (春田 純一, Haruta Jun'ichi).
  - Tsuki-no-Wa (月之輪, Tsukinowa; "Crescent Moon"): A young kunoichi whose true form is Engine Tsuki-no-Wa (炎神月ノ輪, Enjin Tsukinowa), BearRV's Samurai World counterpart. Tsuki-no-Wa is portrayed by Mika Kikuchi (菊地 美香, Kikuchi Mika).
- Kokorootomedes (ココロオトメデス, Kokorootomedesu): (Note: Kokorootomedes' name comes from "Archimedes" and the Japanese words kokoro (心, "heart") and otome (乙女, "maiden").) Hiramechimedes' effeminate, flamboyant, cross dressing, older brother who wields the Kiradecolibur (キラデコリバー, Kiradekoribā) and appears exclusively in the DVD-exclusive special It's a Seminar! Everyone GO-ON!!. He challenges Go-On Red in an attempt to avenge his younger brother. After being defeated however, Kokorootomedes upgrades himself into a berserker form with a Yakuza-inspired personality that allows him to use a dirty fighting style, only to be scrapped by Go-on Red. Kokorootomedes is voiced by Kazuya Nakai, who also voices Hiramechimedes.
- Pollution President Batcheed (害統領バッチード, Gaitōryō Batchīdo): (Note: Batcheed's name comes from the Japanese word batchii (ばっちい, "dirty").) The new leader of Gaiark who appears exclusively in the crossover film Samurai Sentai Shinkenger vs. Go-onger: GinmakuBang!!. While conquering the Western-themed Braneworld of Gunman World (ガンマンワールド, Ganman Wārudo), he encounters and battles the Go-ongers before using a dimensional rift to enter the Human World, where he joins forces with the Gedoushu so he can use their Sanzu River's water to complete his Batchrium Plant (バッチリウムプラント, Batchiriumu Purant) and pollute all of the Braneworlds. After enlarging himself and combining with the Batchrium Plant, he is scrapped by the Go-ongers and Shinkengers' Samurai Formation 23. Batcheed is voiced by Banjō Ginga (銀河 万丈, Ginga Banjō).
- Eleki Clan Zontark (エレ機族ゾンターク, Erekizoku Zontāku): (Note: "Zontark" comes from the Japanese word sontaku (忖度, "surmise").) A clan born from Junk World's electronic waste and the revived Gaiark Pollution Ministers who had conquered the Braneworld three years prior to the events of Engine Sentai Go-onger: 10 Years Grand Prix.
  - Noizun (ノイーズン, Noīzun): The leader of Zontark who assumes a human form called Shinichiro Noizumi (野泉 進一郎, Noizumi Shin'ichirō), Japan's Minister of Defense. In an attempt to conquer the Human World, he isolates it with the Country-Closing Barrier (鎖国バリア, Sakoku Baria) and gives out N Chips (Nチップ, Enu Chippu) to turn people into his servants, Noizumi Children (野泉チルドレン, Noizumi Chirudoren). However, the Go-ongers foil his schemes and, after he enlarges, scrap him with EngineOh G7. Noizun is voiced by Satoshi Jinbo (神保 悟志, Satoshi Jinbo), who also portrays his human form.
  - Grayzky (グレイズキー, Gureizukī): The deputy leader of Zontark who assumes a human form called Taku Kurei (暮井 拓, Kurei Taku), the leader of a special police force. He is scrapped by Go-on Green and Black. Grayzky is voiced by Yuu Kamio (神尾 佑, Kamio Yū), who also portrays his human form.
