= Samurai Sentai Shinkenger vs. Go-onger: GinmakuBang!! =

Japanese name
- Kanji: 侍戦隊シンケンジャーVSゴーオンジャー 銀幕BANG!!
Transcriptions
- Revised Hepburn: Samurai Sentai Shinkenjā tai Gōonjā Ginmakuban
- Directed by: Shōjirō Nakazawa
- Written by: Yasuko Kobayashi
- Produced by: Saburo Yatsude
- Starring: Tori Matsuzaka; Hiroki Aiba; Rin Takanashi; Shogo Suzuki; Suzuka Morita; Keisuke Sohma; Yasuhisa Furuhara; Shinwa Kataoka; Rina Aizawa; Masahiro Usui; Kenji Ebisawa; Akiko Nakagawa; Hidenori Tokuyama; Yumi Sugimoto
- Cinematography: Fumio Matsumura
- Edited by: Ren Sato
- Music by: Hiroshi Takagi; Megumi Ōhashi
- Distributed by: Toei Co. Ltd
- Release date: January 30, 2010
- Running time: 64 minutes
- Country: Japan
- Language: Japanese

Samurai Sentai Shinkenger vs. Go-onger: GinmakuBang!! (侍戦隊シンケンジャーVSゴーオンジャー 銀幕BANG!!, Samurai Sentai Shinkenjā tai Gōonjā Ginmakuban; (Note: The subtitle "GinmakuBang!!" (銀幕BANG!!, Ginmakuban) is a pun as it is pronounced the same as Ginmakuban (銀幕版, "Silver Screen Version" or "The Movie"). The Go-onger film Engine Sentai Go-onger: Boom Boom! Bang Bang! GekijōBang!! was similarly subtitled "GekijōBang!!" (劇場BANG!!, Gekijōban) which was a pun on the word Gekijōban (劇場版, "Theatrical Version" or "The Movie").)) is a Japanese superhero film released in theaters on January 30, 2010, featuring a crossover between the Samurai Sentai Shinkenger and Engine Sentai Go-onger casts and characters. The heroes of Tensou Sentai Goseiger also make a cameo appearance in the film. The catchphrase for the movie is "Two Sentai! On the Road of Justice, Go Forth!!" (2大戦隊! 正義のロードへ、いざ参る!!, Nidai sentai! Seigi no rōdo e, iza mairu!!). Its plot and footage were used in the Power Rangers Samurai team up with Power Rangers RPM Clash of the Red Rangers the Movie.

== Plot ==
A year after defeating Yogoshimacritein, the Go-ongers head to the wild western realm of Gunman World (ガンマンワールド, Ganman Wārudo) to defeat Gaiark's Pollution President Batcheed (害統領バッチード, Gaitōryō Batchīdo) in a final confrontation. However, after defeating EngineOh G9, Batcheed opens up a dimensional rift that sucks the Go-ongers and Engines to other Braneworlds. Soon after, while finding themselves fighting Ugatts, the Shinkengers encounter Go-on Red as he helps takes out the Ugatts on his own, much to the Shinkengers' shock. Soon after, the Shinkengers bring Sōsuke and Bomper to the Shiba House, but Takeru and Sōsuke are unable to work together due to their conflicting personalities. Elsewhere, Batcheed arrives onto the Rokumon Junk to make the Gedoushu an offer to hand him their waters to bring to the mortal realm in order to power his Batchrium Plant. With the Ayakashi Homurakogi supporting him, Batcheed then asks for Yogostein, Kitaneydas, and Kegalesia to support him. However, the trio raid the Gold Zushi cart before they tell the president they want nothing to do with his plan. They then ditch Shinken Gold as they retreat into the Sanzu River while he fights the Ugatts before Go-on Red and the other Shinkengers arrive to support him. The battle ends with the vassals getting sucked into a dimensional rift to save Shinken Red and Go-on Red from Batcheed's attack. While Genta and Mako meet the Sutō Siblings in Christmas World, Kotoha and Chiaki are jailed with Renn and Gunpei by DaiGoyou in Samurai World, and Ryunosuke ends up in Junk World alone until he is found by Saki and Hant as they cheer him up.

Back in the Human World, as Takeru and Sōsuke manage to resolve their differences, the two learn that Hikoma Kusakabe and Bomper have been kidnapped and are being held at Mount Aguruma where an entire army of Nanshi and Ugatts under Batcheed await them. However, when Takeru disregards the safety of the hostages for the sake of the world, Go-on Red is forced to fight Shinken Red. As Batcheed watches on that his enemies are fighting each other, he soon discovers that the fight is only a diversion to allow the Shishi Origami to help Jii and Bomper escape as the Engines arrive with the other Go-ongers and Shinkengers. Together, the two Super Sentai teams defeat the grunts while Shinken Red and Go-on Red take to the road to battle Homurakogi. Akumaro even attempts to get involved in the fight alongside Juzo and Tayu. However, they are prevented by an unfamiliar force claiming to be the 34th Super Sentai, Tensou Sentai Goseiger, who easily dispatches the three monsters. Giving Go-on Red the Dinosaur Disk so he can become Hyper Go-on Red as Shinken Red becomes Super Shinken Red, the two are joined by the others as they slay Homurakogi. Enlarging with his revived aide, Batcheed escapes to the Moon where the Batchrium Plant is, using Homurakogi as a shield to escape the Engine/Origami team attack as he hooks himself up to his Batchrium Plant to achieve his full power. The two teams configure themselves into Samurai Formation 23 to destroy Batcheed before performing a victory clap. Soon after, the Go-ongers head off to the other Braneworlds to find any more surviving Gaiark officers, wishing the Shinkengers luck in keeping their world safe. In the ending theme, we get to see the Shinkenger's origami in "soul form" and Shinkenger's dance number in Samurai World.

== Cast ==
- Takeru Shiba/Shinken Red: Tori Matsuzaka (松坂 桃李, Matsuzaka Tōri)
- Ryunosuke Ikenami/Shinken Blue: Hiroki Aiba (相葉 弘樹, Aiba Hiroki)
- Mako Shiraishi/Shinken Pink: Rin Takanashi (高梨 臨, Takanashi Rin)
- Chiaki Tani/Shinken Green: Shogo Suzuki (鈴木 勝吾, Suzuki Shōgo)
- Kotoha Hanaori/Shinken Yellow: Suzuka Morita (森田 涼花, Morita Suzuka)
- Genta Umemori/Shinken Gold: Keisuke Sohma (相馬 圭祐, Sōma Keisuke)
- Hikoma Kusakabe: Goro Ibuki (伊吹 吾郎, Ibuki Gorō)
- Juzo Fuwa: Mitsuru Karahashi (唐橋 充, Karahashi Mitsuru)
- Sōsuke Esumi/Go-on Red: Yasuhisa Furuhara (古原 靖久, Furuhara Yasuhisa)
- Renn Kōsaka/Go-on Blue: Shinwa Kataoka (片岡 信和, Kataoka Shinwa)
- Saki Rōyama/Go-on Yellow: Rina Aizawa (逢沢 りな, Aizawa Rina)
- Hant Jō/Go-on Green: Masahiro Usui (碓井 将大, Usui Masahiro)
- Gunpei Ishihara/Go-on Black: Kenji Ebisawa (海老澤 健次, Ebisawa Kenji)
- Hiroto Sutō/Go-on Gold: Hidenori Tokuyama (徳山 秀典, Tokuyama Hidenori)
- Miu Sutō/Go-on Silver: Yumi Sugimoto (杉本 有美, Sugimoto Yumi)
- Kegalesia: Nao Oikawa (及川 奈央, Oikawa Nao)
- Child Santa: Tadashi Ōmori (大森 唯詩, Ōmori Tadashi)
- Guard Santa: Hideaki Kusaka (日下 秀昭, Kusaka Hideaki)
- Okappikki: Michitoshi Yamamoto (山本 道俊, Yamamoto Michitoshi)

=== Voice actors ===
- Narrator, Sushi Changer, Inromaru: Hironori Miyata (宮田 浩徳, Miyata Hironori)
- DaiGoyou: Kōichi Tōchika (遠近 孝一, Tōchika Kōichi)
- Doukoku Chimatsuri: Rintaro Nishi (西 凛太朗, Nishi Rintarō)
- Tayu Usukawa: Romi Park (朴 璐美, Paku Romi)
- Shitari of the Bones: Chō (チョー)
- Akumaro Sujigarano: Ryō Horikawa (堀川 りょう, Horikawa Ryō)
- Homurakogi: Hiroyuki Yoshino (吉野 裕行, Yoshino Hiroyuki)
- Engine Speedor: Daisuke Namikawa (浪川 大輔, Namikawa Daisuke)
- Engine Bus-on: Hisao Egawa (江川 央生, Egawa Hisao)
- Engine BearRV: Miki Inoue (井上 美紀, Inoue Miki)
- Engine Birca: Sōichirō Hoshi (保志 総一朗, Hoshi Sōichirō)
- Engine Gunpherd: Kenji Hamada (浜田 賢二, Hamada Kenji)
- Engine Carrigator: Kyousei Tsukui (津久井 教生, Tsukui Kyōsei)
- Engine Toripter: Shizuka Ishikawa (石川 静, Ishikawa Shizuka)
- Engine Jetras: Kiyotaka Furushima (古島 清孝, Furushima Kiyotaka)
- Engine Jum-bowhale: Tomomichi Nishimura (西村 知道, Nishimura Tomomichi)
- Bomper: Akiko Nakagawa (中川 亜紀子, Nakagawa Akiko)
- Yogostein: Kiyoyuki Yanada (梁田 清之, Yanada Kiyoyuki)
- Kitaneydas: Mitsuaki Madono (真殿 光昭, Madono Mitsuaki)
- Batcheed: Banjō Ginga (銀河 万丈, Ginga Banjō)
- Gosei Red (Alata): Yudai Chiba (千葉 雄大, Chiba Yūdai)
- Gosei Pink (Eri): Rika Sato (さとう 里香, Satō Rika)
- Gosei Black (Agri): Kyousuke Hamao (浜尾 京介, Hamao Kyōsuke)
- Gosei Yellow (Moune): Mikiho Niwa (にわ みきほ, Niwa Mikiho)
- Gosei Blue (Hyde): Kento Ono (小野 健斗, Ono Kento)
- Tensouder Voice: Ikuya Sawaki (沢木 郁也, Sawaki Ikuya)

== Theme song ==
- "Samurai First Rap ~GinmakuBang!!~" (侍ファーストラップ ～銀幕BANG!!～, Samurai Fāsuto Rappu ~Ginmakuban!!~)
  - Lyrics: Shoko Fujibayashi and Mike Sugiyama
  - Composition: Kenichiro Ōishi, YOFFY, and Hideaki Takatori
  - Arrangement: Project.R (Kenichiro Ōishi)
  - Artist: YOFFY, Sister MAYO, and Hideaki Takatori (Project.R)
