= Engine Sentai Go-onger vs. Gekiranger =

Japanese name
- Kanji: 劇場版 炎神戦隊ゴーオンジャー VS ゲキレンジャー
Transcriptions
- Revised Hepburn: Gekijōban Enjin Sentai Gōonjā tai Gekirenjā
- Directed by: Satoshi Morota
- Written by: Junko Kōmura; Naruhisa Arakawa
- Produced by: Hajime Sasaki; Atsushi Hikasa; Ken'ichi Wasano; Kazuo Katō; Kōichi Yada
- Starring: Yasuhisa Furuhara; Shinwa Kataoka; Rina Aizawa; Hiroki Suzuki; Mina Fukui; Manpei Takagi; Masahiro Usui; Kenji Ebisawa; Hidenori Tokuyama; Yumi Sugimoto; Riki Miura; Sotaro
- Cinematography: Fumio Matsumura
- Edited by: Ren Sato
- Music by: Megumi Ōhashi; Kazunori Miyake
- Distributed by: Saburo Yatsude; Toei Co. Ltd
- Release date: January 24, 2009
- Running time: 57 minutes
- Country: Japan
- Language: Japanese

Engine Sentai Go-onger vs. Gekiranger the Movie (劇場版 炎神戦隊ゴーオンジャー VS ゲキレンジャー, Gekijōban Enjin Sentai Gōonjā tai Gekirenjā) is the second superhero film adaptation of the 2008 Japanese Super Sentai series Engine Sentai Go-onger. Initially planned to be a V-Cinema release on DVD March 21, 2009, it was announced on December 7, 2008, that it would be released to Japanese theaters on January 24, 2009, to commemorate the fifteenth entry in the Super Sentai VS Series. The film features a team up between the characters of both Engine Sentai Go-onger and its predecessor Juken Sentai Gekiranger. This is the first time that any Super Sentai series has had a film beyond the double-feature with the Kamen Rider Series film during the summer. In its first weekend of release, the film opened at #3 in Japanese box offices and earned the equivalent of US$964,079, showing on 292 screens.

== Plot ==
The story begins when Geki Red battles Nunchaku Banki after returning from his trip around the world for Natsume's birthday, with Geki Yellow and Geki Blue arriving to provide backup. After sending the Gekirangers into another dimension, the Go-ongers arrive before the Barbaric Machine Beast departs after his quarry. After clearing a misunderstanding with Geki Violet and Geki Chopper, the two bring them to SCRTC to see Master Xia Fu, with Hant revealing he met Miki at one of his past jobs at the Kyoryuya Curry Shop. After taking Xia Fu to the site, realizing the Gaiark are after Dōkokugan, he opens the path for them to follow as the Gekirangers are overwhelmed by Nunchaku Banki, who demands the sealed Long from Jan. After the Gekirangers' reunion and meeting the Go-ongers, they take out the Ugatts and overwhelm Nunchaku Banki. In retaliation, he steals the Engine Souls as the Pollution Ministers arrive with the mastermind of their scheme, Meka, who reveals himself as the last of Rinjū Hall's fighters. Using the Engine Souls as his hostages, Meka tricks Jan in giving up the Dōkokugan to save the Engine Souls before sending the Rangers back to their world. As Meka pounds the Dōkokugan into an Engine Soul that is implanted into Nunchaku Banki, the Gekirangers attempt to teach the Go-ongers the ways of the Gekijūken style. Nunchaku Banki arrives to test his new-found power with Meka overseeing it to take in the suffering. The Go-on Wings arrive to take the two trouble makers out of the city before fighting them with what they learned from Gorie.

Although he was unable to endure Jan's teachings, Go-on Red runs to Hiroto and Miu's aid as he battles Nunchaku Banki and gets Speedor back with his newly acquired Engine Ken. After mastering their own Engine Ken style, the other Go-ongers arrive to support Go-on Red and Geki Red while getting back their Engine Souls. After scrapping Nunchaku Banki, the Pollution Ministers retreat to have Meka fend for himself. However, Long breaks from his seal, discarding his robot vessel with intent to get his revenge to be completely free. However, the Go-on Wings arrive with the resurrected Rio and Mele to turn the tables as Long converts Nunchaku Banki into a new form for him in inhabit, Long Banki. While the reds and Rio battle Long Banki, Mele and the Go-on Wings deal with Meka before the teams use a Super-Super Special combo on them. Although Meka is destroyed, Long Banki enlarges with EngineOh G9 and GekiRinTohja Wolf fighting him; Bae would return all the way from India to give commentary. Although the teams are initially overpowered by the immortal, EngineOh G12 and SaiDaiGekiRinTohja are formed and manage to destroy Long Banki with Long resealed. After giving the Dōkokugan back to Jan, Rio and Mele depart for purgatory, with Rio telling Jan he hasn't forgotten his promise. The movie ends with both teams throwing a birthday party for Natsume later that night.

== Characters ==
New characters for the film are Rin Jū Tortoise-Ken Meka (臨獣トータス拳メカ, Rinjū Tōtasuken Meka), an engineer and last surviving Beast-Man of the Rin Jū Hall, and Barbaric Machine Beast Nunchaku Banki (蛮機獣ヌンチャクバンキ, Bankijū Nunchaku Banki), a Barbaric Machine Beast created by Meka who has the powers of the Akugata and the Gaiark.

== Cast ==
- Sōsuke Esumi: Yasuhisa Furuhara (古原 靖久, Furuhara Yasuhisa)
- Renn Kōsaka: Shinwa Kataoka (片岡 信和, Kataoka Shinwa)
- Saki Rōyama: Rina Aizawa (逢沢 りな, Aizawa Rina)
- Hant Jō: Masahiro Usui (碓井 将大, Usui Masahiro)
- Gunpei Ishihara: Kenji Ebisawa (海老澤 健次, Ebisawa Kenji)
- Hiroto Sutō: Hidenori Tokuyama (徳山 秀典, Tokuyama Hidenori)
- Miu Sutō: Yumi Sugimoto (杉本 有美, Sugimoto Yumi)
- Kegalesia: Nao Oikawa (及川 奈央, Oikawa Nao)
- Jan Kandou: Hiroki Suzuki (鈴木 裕樹, Suzuki Hiroki)
- Ran Uzaki: Mina Fukui (福井 未菜, Fukui Mina)
- Retsu Fukami: Manpei Takagi (高木 万平, Takagi Manpei)
- Gou Fukami: Riki Miura (三浦 力, Miura Riki)
- Ken Hisatsu: Sotaro (聡太郎, Sōtarō; Sotaro Yasuda)
- Miki Masaki: Kazue Itō (伊藤 かずえ, Itō Kazue)
- Natsume Masaki: Sakina Kuwae (桑江 咲菜, Kuwae Sakina)
- Rio: Hirofumi Araki (荒木 宏文, Araki Hirofumi)
- Mele: Yuka Hirata (平田 裕香, Hirata Yuka)
- Long: Naoki Kawano (川野 直輝, Kawano Naoki)

=== Voice actors ===
- Speedor: Daisuke Namikawa (浪川 大輔, Namikawa Daisuke)
- Bus-on: Hisao Egawa (江川 央生, Egawa Hisao)
- BearRV: Miki Inoue (井上 美紀, Inoue Miki)
- Birca: Sōichirō Hoshi (保志 総一朗, Hoshi Sōichirō)
- Gunpherd: Kenji Hamada (浜田 賢二, Hamada Kenji)
- Carrigator: Kyōsei Tsukui (津久井 教生, Tsukui Kyōsei)
- Toripter: Shizuka Ishikawa (石川 静, Ishikawa Shizuka)
- Jetras: Kiyotaka Furushima (古島 清孝, Furushima Kiyotaka)
- Jum-bowhale: Tomomichi Nishimura (西村 知道, Nishimura Tomomichi)
- Bomper: Akiko Nakagawa (中川 亜紀子, Nakagawa Akiko)
- Yogostein: Kiyoyuki Yanada (梁田 清之, Yanada Kiyoyuki)
- Kitaneydas: Mitsuaki Madono (真殿 光昭, Madono Mitsuaki)
- Master Xia Fu: Ichirō Nagai (永井 一郎, Nagai Ichirō)
- Bae: Akira Ishida (石田 彰, Ishida Akira)
- Nunchaku Banki: Takahiro Yoshimizu (吉水 孝宏, Yoshimizu Takahiro)
- Meka: Hidenari Ugaki (宇垣 秀成, Ugaki Hidenari)
