= Engine Sentai Go-onger: Boom Boom! Bang Bang! GekijōBang!! =

- Film poster for both Engine Sentai Go-onger: Boom Boom! Bang Bang! GekijōBang!! and Kamen Rider Kiva: King of the Castle in the Demon World
- Kanji: 炎神戦隊ゴーオンジャー BUNBUN！BANBAN！劇場BANG!!
- Revised Hepburn: Enjin Sentai Gōonjā Bunbun! Banban! Gekijōban!!
- Directed by: Noboru Takemoto
- Written by: Sho Aikawa
- Based on: Engine Sentai Go-Onger by Junki Takegami
- Produced by: Saburō Hatsude; Toei
- Starring: Yasuhisa Furuhara; Shinwa Kataoka; Rina Aizawa; Masahiro Usui
- Cinematography: Fumio Matsumura
- Edited by: Ren Sato
- Music by: Megumi Ōhashi
- Distributed by: Toei Co. Ltd
- Release date: August 9, 2008
- Running time: 35 minutes
- Country: Japan
- Language: Japanese

Engine Sentai Go-onger: Boom Boom! Bang Bang! GekijōBang!! (炎神戦隊ゴーオンジャー BUNBUN！BANBAN！劇場BANG!!, Enjin Sentai Gōonjā Bunbun! Banban! Gekijōban!!) is the theatrical film adaptation of the Japanese 2008 Super Sentai series Engine Sentai Go-onger.

As with all of the Super Sentai films, Boom Boom! Bang Bang! GekijōBang!! is a double bill with the film for the 2008 Kamen Rider series Kamen Rider Kiva, Kamen Rider Kiva: King of the Castle in the Demon World. Both films premiered in Japanese theaters on August 9, 2008. The film features guest star J-pop singer Sonim, portraying the antagonist Empress Maki.

== Plot ==
The film begins as Gaiark Pollution Ministers attempt to break the dimensional barriers that separate the Braneworlds, recycling 13 Barbaric Machine Beasts to help them out. The Go-ongers intercept the Recycle Barbaric Machine Beast Army in their Engines, managing to scrap the 13. However, trio of mysterious warriors appear and their actions result with the Go-ongers losing the primary Engine Casts while being sucked into the Braneworld known as Samurai World (サムライワールド, Samurai Wārudo), a dimension similar to Edo Japan where power is essential. Attempting to find the missing Engine Casts of Speedor, Bus-on and BearRV while Jumboale and Carrigator work hard to keep the portal between the two worlds open, the Go-ongers pursue the Honōshū.

After escaping a group of Samurai, the primary Go-ongers run for their lives before being saved by Tsuki-no-Wa, who brings them to the others. But Raiken and Gokumaru arrive with Hant and Gunpei after taking Birc and Gunpherd's Engine Souls, forcing the Honōshū to reveal themselves as Engine Souls. However, they are unable to bond with the primary Engine Casts with the Yōma taking them. After learning the Honōshū's story, the Go-ongers offer their aid in storming Maki's castle the day, finding the Sutō siblings who pretend to work for Maki in order to return the Engine Casts to them.

As the others destroy Maki's Yōma servants with Hyper Cannonball to get back Shishi-no-Shin & Tsuki-no-Wa's Engine Casts, Go-on Red is overwhelmed by Maki until the Honōshū arrive. However, with Engine-Oh and the other Engines fighting Maki in her monstrous form before being broken down. But Sōsuke manages to grab on to one of Maki's heads, fighting his way to Retsu-Taka's Engine Cast. Once getting the Engine Cast, Maki assumes her true form as the Honōshū risk themselves to form Engine Daishougun with Sōsuke piloting them to destroy Maki and burn her castle to the ground. With the battle over, as Samurai World's denizens return to normal, Engine Daishogun turns to stone much to Sōsuke's dismay. The Go-on teams soon return to their world.

== Internet spin-off film ==
On June 2, 2008, Toei announced on its various official websites that there would be a series of short five-minute internet movies that are spin-offs of both King of the Castle in the Demon World and Boom Boom! Bang Bang! GekijōBang!! to be accessed by a mobile phone service. In the case of Boom Boom! Bang Bang! GekijōBang!!, the featurettes are called Engine Sentai Go-onger: Bom Bom! Bom Bom! Net de Bong!! (炎神戦隊ゴーオンジャーBONBON！BONBON！ネットでBONG!!, Enjin Sentai Gōonjā Bonbon! Bonbon! Netto de Bon!!), released on July 11, 2008. In "Bom Bom! Bom Bom! Net de Bong", the Gaiark Pollution Ministers begin setting up their plan break the dimensional barriers that separate the Braneworlds in order to create their Gaiark haven, setting up the opening sequences for the actual movie. However, while the Go-ongers are trapped in Samurai World, the Ministers attempt to take advantage of the event by subduing Bomper, who battles them personally when they attempt to set a trap for the Go-ongers as they return to their dimension.

=== Webisodes ===
1. Dimensions Mingling? Bom-Bom (次元が混ざる？ボンボン, Jigen ga Mazaru? Bonbon)
2. The Barbaric Machine Beasts' Great Revival? Bom-Bom (蛮機獣が大復活？ボンボン, Bankijū ga Dai Fukkatsu? Bonbon)
3. Mysterious Three-Man Group? Bom-Bom (謎の三人組？ボンボン, Nazo no Sanningumi? Bonbon)
4. The Go-ongers Missing? Bom-Bom (ゴーオンジャー行方不明？ボンボン, Gōonjā Yukuefumei? Bonbon)
5. The Returning Heroes? Bom-Bom (ヒーロー帰還？ボンボン, Hīrō Kikan? Bonbon)

== Cast ==
- Sōsuke Esumi: Yasuhisa Furuhara (古原 靖久, Furuhara Yasuhisa)
- Renn Kōsaka: Shinwa Kataoka (片岡 信和, Kataoka Shinwa)
- Saki Rōyama: Rina Aizawa (逢沢 りな, Aizawa Rina)
- Hant Jō: Masahiro Usui (碓井 将大, Usui Masahiro)
- Gunpei Ishihara: Kenji Ebisawa (海老澤 健次, Ebisawa Kenji)
- Hiroto Sutō: Hidenori Tokuyama (徳山 秀典, Tokuyama Hidenori)
- Miu Sutō: Yumi Sugimoto (杉本 有美, Sugimoto Yumi)
- Kegalesia, Landlady: Nao Oikawa (及川 奈央, Oikawa Nao)
- Empress Maki: Sonim (ソニン, Sonin)
- Retsu-Taka: Kento Handa (半田 健人, Handa Kento).
- Shishi-no-Shin: Jyunichi Haruta (春田 純一, Haruta Jun'ichi)
- Tsuki-no-Wa: Mika Kikuchi (菊地 美香, Kikuchi Mika)
- Samurai: Seizō Fukumoto (福本 清三, Fukumoto Seizō)

=== Voice actors ===
- Speedor: Daisuke Namikawa (浪川 大輔, Namikawa Daisuke)
- Bus-on: Hisao Egawa (江川 央生, Egawa Hisao)
- BearRV: Miki Inoue (井上 美紀, Inoue Miki)
- Birca: Sōichirō Hoshi (保志 総一朗, Hoshi Sōichirō)
- Gunpherd: Kenji Hamada (浜田 賢二, Hamada Kenji)
- Carrigator: Kyōsei Tsukui (津久井 教生, Tsukui Kyōsei)
- Toripter: Shizuka Ishikawa (石川 静, Ishikawa Shizuka)
- Jetras: Kiyotaka Furushima (古島 清孝, Furushima Kiyotaka)
- Jum-bowhale: Tomomichi Nishimura (西村 知道, Nishimura Tomomichi)
- Bomper: Akiko Nakagawa (中川 亜紀子, Nakagawa Akiko)
- Yogostein, Ronin: Kiyoyuki Yanada (梁田 清之, Yanada Kiyoyuki)
- Kitaneydas, Young samurai: Mitsuaki Madono (真殿 光昭, Madono Mitsuaki)
- Raiken: Naoya Uchida (内田 直哉, Uchida Naoya)
- Gokumaru: Masaya Matsukaze (松風 雅也, Matsukaze Masaya)

== Songs ==
Opening theme

- "Engine Sentai Go-onger (GekijōBang Edition) (炎神戦隊ゴーオンジャー（劇場BANG Edition）, Enjin Sentai Gōonjā (Gekijōban Edishon))
  - Lyrics: Mike Sugiyama
  - Composition: Takafumi Iwasaki
  - Artist: Hideyuki Takahashi (Project. R)

Ending theme

- "Engine Formation Rap -GekijōBang! Custom-" (炎神フォーメーションラップ-劇場BANG! CUSTOM-, Enjin Fōmēshon Rappu -Gekijōban! Kasutamu-; 25, Movie)^{*}
  - Lyrics: Mike Sugiyama
  - Composition & Arrangement: Kenichiro Ōishi
  - Artist: Project. R (Takayoshi Tanimoto, Hideaki Takatori, Sister MAYO, Hideyuki Takahashi, Takafumi Iwasaki, YOFFY, Mayumi Gojo, Kenichiro Ōishi) with Engine Kids

"Engine Formation Rap -GekijōBang! Custom-" was also used as the ending theme for episode 25 of the series.
