= Kyousei Tsukui =

Japanese retired voice actor)

Kyōsei Tsukui
- 津久井 教生
- Born: Norio Tsukui; Shinjuku, Tokyo, Japan
- Occupation: Voice actor
- Years active: 1983–2023

Kyōsei Tsukui (津久井 教生, Tsukui Kyōsei) is a Japanese retired voice actor who worked for 81 Produce.

On October 1, 2019, Tsukui revealed that he has been diagnosed with ALS and has been using a cane and wheelchair to help with his mobility. On February 17, 2023, Tsukui revealed that he has lost his voice and has retired from voice acting as a result of undergoing a tracheotomy. He is also no longer able to use his arms or legs and only communicates through digital software.
During 2025, he wrote a book on his life, typed using eye-tracking technology. In February 2026, it was announced to be published later that year, on April 27, 2026.

== Filmography ==
=== Television animation ===
- Chibi Maruko-chan (1990), Shinji Sekiguchi, Mamoru Kawada, Yamane's Father, Alien
- Dororonpa! (1991), Takashi
- Mobile Fighter G Gundam (1994), Michelo Chariot
- Azuki-chan (1995), Makoto Sakaguchi
- Neighborhood Story (1995), Jiro Nishino
- Detective Conan (1996), Naoya Nishitani
- You're Under Arrest (1996), Daisuke
- Bubu Chacha (1999), Mary's Father, Bobby
- Dr. Slump (1999), Majito
- Ojamajo Doremi (1999), Kouji Senoo
- s-CRY-ed (2001), Straight Cougar
- Rozen Maiden (2004), Detective Kun-kun and Laplace's Demon
- He Is My Master (2005), Pochi
- Black Blood Brothers (2006), Johan Tsang
- Zombie-Loan (2007), Hakka
- The Idolmaster (2011), Program Director
- Hunter × Hunter (2013), Baro, Bihorn, Flutter
- Fantasista Doll (2013), Rinto Mikasa
- Wish Upon the Pleiades (2015), Nanako's father

=== Theatrical animation ===
- Dorami & Doraemons: Robot School's Seven Mysteries!? (1996), El Matadora
- Tekken: The Motion Picture (1998), Baek Doo San
- Digimon Tamers: Battle of Adventurers (2001), Labramon, Shisamon

=== Tokusatsu ===
- Ninja Sentai Kakuranger (1994), Yokai
- Chouriki Sentai Ohranger (1995), Bara Cactus 2 (ep. 5)
- Gekisou Sentai Carranger (1996), Deputy Leader Zelmoda
- Seijuu Sentai Gingaman (1998), Chainzaws (ep. 45)
- Kyuukyuu Sentai GoGo-V (1999), Fighting Psyma Beast Spartan (ep. 36)
- Hyakujuu Sentai Gaoranger (2001), Cellphone Org (ep. 9)
- Bakuryuu Sentai Abaranger (2003), Trinoid 12: Yatsudenwani (eps. 18 - 50)
- Tokusou Sentai Dekaranger (2004), Wandean Niwande (ep. 27)
- GoGo Sentai Boukenger (2006), Tsukumogami Kanadegami (ep. 12)
- Kamen Rider Den-O (2007), Crust Imagin (ep. 5 & 6)
- Juuken Sentai Gekiranger (2007), Mythical Beast Afanc-Fist Sojo (ep. 41 & 42)
- Engine Sentai Go-Onger (2008), Engine Carrigator (eps. 7 - 47 & 50)
- Engine Sentai Go-onger: Boom Boom! Bang Bang! GekijōBang!! (2008), Carrigator
- Engine Sentai Go-onger vs. Gekiranger (2009), Carrigator
- Samurai Sentai Shinkenger vs. Go-onger: GinmakuBang!! (2010), Carrigator
- Tensou Sentai Goseiger (2010), Namono-Gatari of Orthturos Headder (Gatari (Namono Voice by Takahiro Imamura)) (ep. 46)
- Kaizoku Sentai Gokaiger vs. Space Sheriff Gavan: The Movie (2012), Trinoid 12: Yatsudenwani
- Tokumei Sentai Go-Busters (2012), Keshigomuloid (ep. 26)
- Tokumei Sentai Go-Busters vs. Kaizoku Sentai Gokaiger: The Movie (2013), Trinoid 12: Yatsudenwani
- Ressha Sentai ToQger Vs. Kamen Rider Gaim Spring Vacation Combining Special (2014), Moguraroid
- Uchu Sentai Kyuranger (2017), Goneshi (ep. 15 & 25)

=== Video games ===
- Psychic Force (1995), Gates Oltman, Keith Evans
- Gunbird 2 (1998), Pom-Pom
- GA Geijutsuka Art Design Class (2010), Takuma Sotoma
- Everybody's Golf 6 (2011), Edge

=== Dubbing roles ===
==== Live-action ====
- Broken Arrow, Giles Prentice (Frank Whaley)

==== Animation ====
- Cars 2, Acer
- Mutant Turtles: Superman Legend, Bebop
- Inspector Gadget
- Thomas the Tank Engine & Friends, Donald and Douglas (Season 11 onwards succeeding Hiroyuki Satō and Takeshi Endo)
