= Kenji Ebisawa =

Japanese actor (born 1986)

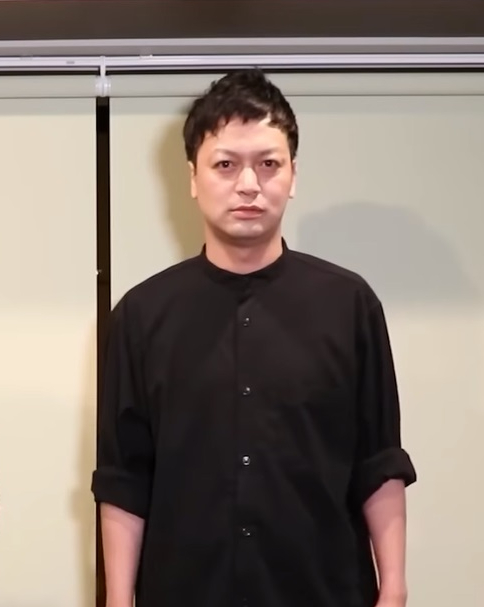
- Ebisawa in 2022
- Born: October 22, 1986 (age 39); Okinawa Prefecture, Japan
- Occupation: Actor
- Years active: 2005-current
- Height: 180 cm (5 ft 11 in)
- Website: http://www.cubeinc.co.jp/members/prf/108.html

Kenji Ebisawa (海老澤 健次, Ebisawa Kenji; born October 22, 1986) is a Japanese actor, best known for the role of Gunpei Ishihara/Go-on Black in the 2008 tokusatsu series Engine Sentai Go-onger.

== Filmography ==
=== Television ===
- Mirai Souzoudou as Kazuo Watanabe (NTV, 2006)
- Uramiya Honpo as Kazuo Misato (TV Tokyo, 2006)
- Picnic no Junbi (2006)
- Shinuka to Omotta in Case 3 (NTV, 2007)
- Top Caster (Fuji TV, 2006)
- Kami wa Saikoro wo Furanai (NTV, 2006)
- Engine Sentai Go-onger as Gunpei Ishihara/Go-On Black (TV Asahi, 2008)
- Yako no Kaidan as Jun Hasegawa (TV Asahi, 2009)
- Ikemen Sobaya Tantei~Iin da ze!~ as Kenji (Nihon TV, 2009)
- Ikemen Shin Sobaya Tantei~Iin da ze!~ as Kenji (Nihon TV 2009)
- Zyuden Sentai Kyoryuger as Shiro Mifune (TV Asahi, 2013)

=== Cinema ===
- Yoru no Picnic (2006)
- Engine Sentai Go-onger: Boom Boom! Bang Bang! GekijōBang!! (2008 Toei) as Gunpei Ishihara/Go-On Black
- Engine Sentai Go-onger vs. Gekiranger (2009 Toei) as Gunpei Ishihara/Go-On Black
- Samurai Sentai Shinkenger vs. Go-onger: GinmakuBang!! (2010 Toei) as Gunpei Ishihara/Go-On Black

== Other media ==
=== Stage ===
- GODSPELL (2005)
- Sophistry (2006)

=== Endorsements ===
- Nivea-KAO
- Aoyama Trading
- NTT DoCoMo
