= Mina Fukui =

Japanese idol, actress and model

- 福井 未菜
- Born: November 3, 1984 (age 40); Nabari, Mie Prefecture, Japan
- Occupations: Actress; television personality; gravure idol
- Years active: 2003–2010
- Spouse: Tomohiro Hara (m. 2011)
- Children: 1

Mina Fukui (福井 未菜, Fukui Mina, November 3, 1984) is a Japanese former actress, television personality and gravure model from Nabari, Mie Prefecture. She worked under the Horipro talent agency.

== Career ==
Even though she had been featured as a guest or assistant in several shows during the 1990s and early 2000s, it was after the first Mōdoru Audition (a portmanteau of the words "Mode", "Model" and "Idol") in 2003 that she effectively broke into the world of entertainment. Since then she's been featured in several commercials (such as 7-Eleven or ECC), magazines and variety shows, as well as the 2007 Super Sentai Series Juken Sentai Gekiranger. As a gravure idol she's also released a photobook and three image DVDs, but she eventually retired in 2010 for unknown reasons.

After retiring, she married with Tomohiro Hara in 2011. She gave birth to her first child, a baby girl in 2013.

== Television ==
- Juken Sentai Gekiranger as Ran Uzaki/Geki Yellow (2007)
- Garo (TV series) as Asami Shinohara (2005)

== Film ==
- Juken Sentai Gekiranger: Nei-Nei! Hou-Hou! Hong Kong Decisive Battle as Ran Uzaki/Geki Yellow (2007)
- Juken Sentai Gekiranger vs Boukenger as Ran Uzaki/Geki Yellow (2008)
- Engine Sentai Go-onger vs. Gekiranger as Ran Uzaki/Geki Yellow (2009)
