= Rina Aizawa =

Japanese actress

- 逢沢 りな
- Born: July 28, 1991 (age 35); Tokyo, Japan
- Occupations: Actress; Gravure model
- Years active: 2008–present
- Agent: Box Corporation
- Spouse: Hiroshi Kamiya (m. 2025)

Rina Aizawa (逢沢 りな, Aizawa Rina; born July 28, 1991) is a Japanese actress and gravure idol signed under Box Corporation. She is best known for her role Saki Royama/Go-on Yellow in Super Sentai series Engine Sentai Go-Onger.

== History ==
She debuted in 2008 in the TV Asahi's tokusatsu series Engine Sentai Go-onger as Saki Rōyama/Go-on Yellow.

She is ranked 249th out of 422001 people according to Oricon Style's page.

She was selected to be the support manager for the 87th All Japan High School Soccer Tournament. Previous managers were idols like Maki Horikita, Yui Aragaki, and Kie Kitano.

== Personal life ==
On January 1, 2025, Aizawa announced through her Twitter/X account that she had registered her marriage with voice actor Hiroshi Kamiya.

== Filmography ==
=== Film ===
Year	Title	Role	Producer	Other notes
2008	Engine Sentai Go-onger: Boom Boom! Bang Bang! GekijōBang!!	Saki Rōyama/Go-on Yellow	Toei	
2009	Engine Sentai Go-onger vs. Gekiranger	Saki Rōyama/Go-on Yellow	Toei	November 21
2009	Battle of Demons	Kanna Asagiri	Jolly Roger	
2010	Samurai Sentai Shinkenger vs. Go-onger: GinmakuBang!!	Saki Rōyama/Go-on Yellow	Toei	
2011	Koukou Debut - High School Debut	Asami Komiyama	Asmik Ace Entertainment	
2011	Gokaiger Goseiger Super Sentai 199 Hero Great Battle	Saki Rōyama/Go-on Yellow	Toei	
2011	Kaizoku Sentai Gokaiger the Movie: The Flying Ghost Ship	Saki Rōyama/Go-on Yellow	Toei	
2018	50 First Kisses		Sony Pictures	
2018	Engine Sentai Go-onger: 10 Years Grand Prix	Saki Rōyama/Go-on Yellow	Toei	

=== TV Drama ===
Year	Title	Role	Network	Other notes	Ref.
2008	Engine Sentai Go-Onger	Saki Rōyama/Go-on Yellow	TV Asahi		
2009	Honcho Azumi	Sayaka Takazawa	TBS	Episode 11	
2009	Tenchijin	Omatsu	NHK	Episode 39 - 44	
2009	I am GHOST	Kana	BEE TV	Mobile Drama	
2010	Yagyu Bugeicho	Tahime	TBS		
2010	Liar Game: Season 2	Reiko Okabe	Fuji TV	Episode 9	
2010	Hidarime Tantei	Haruka Yoshinaga	NTV	Episode 4	
2010	Kioku no Umi	Mari Tsukamoto	TBS		
2010	Sunao ni Narenakute	Yuki Maeda	Fuji TV		
2010	TRICK Shinsaku Special 2	Reiko Ishisaka	TV Asahi		
2010	Hammer Session!	Mayu Mizuno	TBS		
2012	My Summer Vacation	Chika Mochizuki			
2013	Galileo 2	Misaki Tono	Fuji TV		
2013	Iryu Sousa 3	Eri Nagasawa	TV Asahi	Episode 2	
2014	Kuu Neru Futari Sumu Futari	Marie Morizono	NHK		
2014	ST Aka to Shiro no Sōsa File	Yuko Mizuki	NTV	Episode 5	
2014	Dear Sister	Machiko	Fuji TV	OL Group	
2014	Kurofuku Monogatari	Aoi	TV Asahi		
2015	Taikomochi no Tatsujin	Misako Kawai	TV Tokyo	Introspective Woman	
2015	Hondana Shokudo	Sumire Kurata	NHK		
2015	Busu to Yajuu	Azusa Kamijō	Fuji TV		
2015	Shin Botan to Bara	Miwako Kohinata	Tokai TV		
2016	Good Partner	Nao Sakurai	TV Asahi	Episode 5	
2016	Onnatachi no Tokusō Saizensen	Yū	TV Asahi	Episode 3	
2016	Yowamushi Pedal		BS SKY PerfecTV!	Episode 7	
2016	Sennyū Sōsa Idol Deka Dance	Arisu Sunaga	TV Tokyo		
2017	Scum's Wish	Akane Minagawa	Fuji TV		
2017	Code Blue 3	Mio Oshima	Fuji TV	Episode 7	
2018	Keiji 7-nin Season 4	Mayu Inoue	TV Asahi	Episode 4	
2018	Silent Voice	Kasumi Yatabe	BS Japan	Episode 10	
2018	Legal V	Kasumi Fujiwara	TV Asahi	Episode 6	
2018	Bōkyaku no Sachiko	Rena Hashimoto	TV Tokyo		
2019	Miki Kurinikku de Kanpai o	Kumiko Serizawa	TV Tokyo, BS Japan	Episode 9	
2021	Ultraman Trigger: New Generation Tiga	Yurika Shizuma	Tsuburaya Productions	Episode 9	

=== CD ===
- G3 Princess Rap: Pretty Love Limited (G3プリンセス ラップ～PRETTY LOVE♡Limited～)
- G3 Princess CD Box Limited Release

=== Live Matches ===
- 87th All Japan High School Soccer Tournament Support Manager

=== CM ===
- Kowa [Puchiuna Kowa] Summer CM
- Kowa [Goruken Kowa] CM
- Japan Kentucky Fried Chicken [Your Support, Pizza Hut's Pizza Fight!] CM
- Kowa [Puchiuna ALPHA] CM
- Shunkado [Unagipai50] CM

== DVD ==
- Rina Aizawa: Smile (Released July 21, 2008 Toei)
- Rina Aizawa: Holiday (Released September 25, 2009 Wani)
- RINA'S WONDERLAND 19Graffiti (Released July 23, 2010 Takeshobo)
- LINA Jump (Released June 23, 2010 Liverpool)

== Photobook ==
- Engine Sentai Go-Onger Photobook Mahha Zenkai! <炎神戦隊ゴーオンジャー写真集 マッハ全開！>(Released August 2008 Ichijinsha)
- G3 Princess Picture Book <G3プリンセスビジュアルBOOK> (Released October 2008 Gakken)
- Engine Sentai Go-Onger Character Book Let's Go On!!!! <炎神戦隊ゴーオンジャーキャラクターブック Let's GO ON!!!!> (Released February 2009 Tokyo News Service)
- 『Rina』 First Official Photobook <逢沢りな写真集『Rina』> (Released July 28, 2009 Wani)
- 「Welina ‐a girl's memory in her teens‐」 Second Official Photobook <逢沢りな写真集/「Welina ‐a girl's memory in her teens‐」> (Released April 21, 2011 Shueisha)

== Calendar ==
- Rina Aizawa Try-X 2009 Calendar (Released September 27, 2008)
- Rina Aizawa Try-X 2010 Calendar (Released October 10, 2009)
- Rina Aizawa Try-X 2011 Calendar (Released October 2, 2010)
