= Shinwa Kataoka =

Japanese actor (born 1985)

- 片岡 信和
- Occupation: Actor
- Years active: 2008–present
- Height: 183.6 cm (6 ft 0 in)
- Website: http://www.promage.co.jp/kataoka.htm

Shinwa Kataoka (片岡 信和, Kataoka Shinwa) is a Japanese actor, who began his acting career as Renn Kōsaka/Go-On Blue in the 2008 tokusatsu series Engine Sentai Go-onger. He is currently works as weather forecast presenter for TV Asahi morning news and featured in television advertisements for Takara Tomy's children's game Kurohige Kiki Ippatsu (Pop-up Pirate).

== Filmography ==
=== Drama television ===
- Boys Esté (TV Tokyo, 2007)
- Engine Sentai Go-onger (TV Asahi, 2008 - 2009) - Renn Kousaka / Go-on Blue
- Kaoruko - Empress of the Night ( Jotei Kaoruko ) ([TV Asahi], 2010) - Minoru Yoshikawa
- Kokuhatsu~Kokusen Bengonin(TV Asahi,2011)- bartender
- Nakase no Onna (TV Asahi,2011)eps.1- Ryuichi
- Sengoku Danshi (TV Yokohama,2011) - Sadatsuna Oouchi

=== Films ===
- Juken no Cinderella (2008)
- Engine Sentai Go-onger: Boom Boom! Bang Bang! GekijōBang!! (Toei, 2008) - Renn Kousaka / Go-on Blue
- Engine Sentai Go-onger vs. Gekiranger (Toei, 2009) - Renn Kousaka / Go-on Blue
- Gakkou Ura-Site (2009) - Shin'ichiro Kamiya
- Slackers: Kizudarake no Yuujou (December 2009) - Shigeru Nihei
- Kemuri wo meguru Bouken (2010) - Nobuyuki Kiyasu
- Samurai Sentai Shinkenger vs. Go-onger: GinmakuBang!! (Toei, 2010) - Renn Kousaka / Go-on Blue
- Hard Life(2011)
- Ano Sora no Ao(2012) - Ayumu Tono
- Go-Onger:10 Years after GrandPrix (2018)/Go-on Blue

=== CM ===
- Goodwill: Mobaito dot Com (2006)
- Takara Tomy: Pop-up Pirate (2009)
- Kao (2009)

=== DVD ===
- Engine Sentai Go-onger: Bon Bon! Bon Bon! Net de Bong!! (2008) - Renn Kousaka / Go-on Blue
- DVD Spesial di Engine Sentai Go-onger: It's a Seminar! Everyone GO-ON!! (2008) - Renn Kousaka / Go-on Blue
- Engine Sentai Go-onger vs. Gekiranger (Toei, 2009) - Renn Kousaka / Go-on Blue

=== Theatre ===
- Back Stage (versi teater) (2009)
- Boku wa, Kimi no tame ni koso Shi ni niiku (2009)
- Sengoku Basara (versi teater) (2009) - Sanada Yukimura
- Musikal Nintama Rantaro (2010) - Tomesaburo Kema

=== PV ===
- May: "Sarai no Kaze" (2007)
- Tee with Crystal Kay: "Answer" (2012)

== Other media ==
TV Commercials

- Tomy Takara
- goodwill
