= Engine Sentai Go-onger =

Japanese television series

- Title card
- Genre: Tokusatsu; Sport; Superhero fiction Adventure; Science fiction Comedy
- Created by: Toei Company
- Developed by: Junki Takegami
- Directed by: Katsuya Watanabe
- Starring: Yasuhisa Furuhara; Shinwa Kataoka; Rina Aizawa; Masahiro Usui; Kenji Ebisawa; Hidenori Tokuyama; Yumi Sugimoto; Nao Oikawa
- Opening theme: "Engine Sentai Go-onger" by Hideyuki Takahashi (Project.R)
- Ending theme: "Engine First Lap -Type Normal-" by Project.R with Engine Kids "Engine Second Lap -TURBO CUSTOM-" by Project.R with Engine Kids "Engine Third Lap -AERO-Dynamic CUSTOM-" by Project.R with Engine Kids "Engine Final Rap -Type Evolution-" by Project.R with Engine Kids
- Composers: Megumi Ohashi; Kenichiro Ōishi
- Country of origin: Japan
- No. of episodes: 50 (list of episodes)

Production
- Producers: Masashi Yagi; Jun Hikasa; Kenichi Wasano(Toei); Kōichi Yada (Toei Agency)
- Production location: Tokyo, Japan (Greater Tokyo Area)
- Running time: 24–25 minutes
- Production companies: TV Asahi; Toei Company; Toei Agency

Original release
- Network: TV Asahi; UX
- Release: February 17, 2008 – February 8, 2009

Related
- Juken Sentai Gekiranger; Samurai Sentai Shinkenger

Engine Sentai Go-onger (炎神戦隊ゴーオンジャー, Enjin Sentai Gōonjā; Engine Squadron Go-onger) (Note: Enjin (炎神) literally translates as "Flame God", but the program uses the English word "Engine" rather than the romanization "Enjin".) (Note: "Go-onger" (ゴーオンジャー, Gōonjā) is a portmanteau of the Japanese words for "thunderous sound" (轟音, gōon) and "Ranger" (レンジャー, Renjā). It is also related to the English words "go on".) is Toei Company's 32nd installment in the Super Sentai metaseries of Japanese tokusatsu television series. It aired from February 17, 2008 to February 8, 2009, replacing Juken Sentai Gekiranger and was replaced by Samurai Sentai Shinkenger. The program was part of TV Asahi's 2008 Super Hero Time block alongside Kamen Rider Kiva. Its footage was used for the American series, Power Rangers RPM and was dubbed into Korean as Power Rangers Engine Force (파워레인저 엔진포스).

== Synopsis ==
Machine World (マシンワールド, Mashin Wārudo) is one of the 11 Braneworlds (ブレーンワールド, Burēnwārudo) other than our own, which is referred as the Human World (ヒューマンワールド, Hyūman Wārudo), and it is home to giant vehicular beings called Engines who wage a war against the Gaiark who desire to pollute their world. Losing, Gaiark's three Pollution Ministers' escape leaves them on Earth, seeing the Human World as an easier location to create their ideal paradise. The six Engines manage to pursue them, selecting five humans to become their partners, the Go-ongers. The team are joined by Go-on Wings and their Wing Engines, as well as the Ancient Engines, as they all together battle the Gaiark as well as other evil villains from other Braneworlds.

== Episodes ==
The episodes (whose titles contain a kanji phrase followed by a katakana phrase) are titled as Grand Prix (グランプリ, Guran Puri), or "GP" for short.

No.	Title	Written by	Original release date
1	"Allies of Justice"; Transliteration: "Seigi no Mikata" (Japanese: 正義ノミカタ)	Junki Takegami	February 17, 2008
2	"Reckless Guys"; Transliteration: "Mucha na Yatsura" (Japanese: 無茶ナヤツラ)	Junki Takegami	February 24, 2008
3	"Basic Investigation"; Transliteration: "Sōsa no Kihon" (Japanese: 捜査ノキホン)	Junki Takegami	March 2, 2008
4	"Engine Trouble"; Transliteration: "Enjin Toraburu" (Japanese: 炎神トラブル)	Junki Takegami	March 9, 2008
5	"Sometimes a Mother!?"; Transliteration: "Tokidoki Okan!?" (Japanese: 時々オカン！？)	Junki Takegami	March 16, 2008
6	"The Maiden's Heart"; Transliteration: "Otome no Kokoro" (Japanese: 乙女ノココロ)	Junki Takegami	March 23, 2008
7	"Partner Amigo"; Transliteration: "Aibō Amīgo" (Japanese: 相棒アミーゴ)	Shō Aikawa	March 30, 2008
8	"The Greatest Miracle"; Transliteration: "Saikō no Kiseki" (Japanese: 最高ノキセキ)	Shō Aikawa	April 6, 2008
9	"Tomorrow is There"; Transliteration: "Ashita ga Arusa" (Japanese: 明日ガアルサ)	Junki Takegami	April 13, 2008
10	"Starting Alright"; Transliteration: "Hassha Ōrai" (Japanese: 発車オーライ)	Junki Takegami	April 20, 2008
11	"Airwave Jack"; Transliteration: "Denpa Jakku" (Japanese: 電波ジャック)	Kenji Konuta	April 27, 2008
12	"Sōsuke Banki!?"; Transliteration: "Sōsuke Banki!?" (Japanese: 走輔バンキ！？)	Jun'ichi Miyashita	May 4, 2008
13	"Tank Full of Chivalry"; Transliteration: "Otokogi Mantan" (Japanese: 侠気マンタン)	Naruhisa Arakawa	May 11, 2008
14	"Doki Doki Every Day"; Transliteration: "Mainichi Doki Doki" (Japanese: 毎日ドキドキ)	Shō Aikawa	May 18, 2008
15	"Engine Stall"; Transliteration: "Enjin Sutōru" (Japanese: 炎神ストール)	Junki Takegami	May 25, 2008
16	"Honor Recovery"; Transliteration: "Meiyo Bankai" (Japanese: 名誉バンカイ)	Junki Takegami	June 1, 2008
17	"Wings of Justice"; Transliteration: "Seigi no Tsubasa" (Japanese: 正義ノツバサ)	Junki Takegami	June 8, 2008
18	"Commoner Hero"; Transliteration: "Shomin Hīrō" (Japanese: 庶民ヒーロー)	Junki Takegami	June 15, 2008
19	"Gunpei's True Intentions"; Transliteration: "Gunpei no Honne" (Japanese: 軍平ノホンネ)	Jun'ichi Miyashita	June 22, 2008
20	"Sibling Battle!?"; Transliteration: "Kyōdai Batoru!?" (Japanese: 兄妹バトル！？)	Naruhisa Arakawa, Junko Kōmura	July 6, 2008
21	"Childish Guys"; Transliteration: "Yōchi na Yatsura" (Japanese: 幼稚ナヤツラ)	Junki Takegami	July 13, 2008
22	"Final Request"; Transliteration: "Saigo no Nozomi" (Japanese: 最後ノノゾミ)	Junki Takegami	July 20, 2008
23	"Reckless Flash"; Transliteration: "Bōsō Hirameki" (Japanese: 暴走ヒラメキ)	Kenji Konuta	July 27, 2008
24	"First Smile"; Transliteration: "Saisho no Egao" (Japanese: 最初ノエガオ)	Kenji Konuta	August 3, 2008
25	"Goodbye Mother"; Transliteration: "Okan Sayonara" (Japanese: 母上(オカン)サヨナラ)	Shō Aikawa	August 10, 2008
26	"Love Affair"; Transliteration: "Ren'ai Kankei" (Japanese: 恋愛カンケイ)	Shō Aikawa	August 17, 2008
27	"Granddaughter Hant!?"; Transliteration: "Magomusume Hanto!?" (Japanese: 孫娘ハント！？)	Junki Takegami	August 24, 2008
28	"Partner Gunpei"; Transliteration: "Aibō Gunpei" (Japanese: 相棒グンペイ)	Junki Takegami	August 31, 2008
29	"Stop Hiroto"; Transliteration: "Hiroto o Tomero" (Japanese: 大翔ヲトメロ)	Shō Aikawa	September 7, 2008
30	"Friendship's Punch"; Transliteration: "Yūjō no Panchi" (Japanese: 友情ノパンチ)	Shō Aikawa	September 14, 2008
31	"Idol Debut"; Transliteration: "Aidoru Debyū" (Japanese: 歌姫(アイドル)デビュー)	Naruhisa Arakawa	September 21, 2008
32	"Search for a treasure" Transliteration: "Hihō o Sagase" (Japanese: 秘宝ヲサガセ)	Junki Takegami	September 28, 2008
33	"Primeval Engines"; Transliteration: "Genshi Enjin" (Japanese: 原始エンジン)	Junki Takegami	October 5, 2008
34	"Devilish Woman"; Transliteration: "Akuma na Onna" (Japanese: 悪魔ナオンナ)	Junki Takegami	October 12, 2008
35	"Engines' Bonds"; Transliteration: "Enjin no Kizuna" (Japanese: 炎神ノキズナ)	Jun'ichi Miyashita	October 19, 2008
36	"Sōsuke… Eternally"; Transliteration: "Sōsuke… Towa ni" (Japanese: 走輔…トワニ)	Jun'ichi Miyashita	October 26, 2008
37	"Engine Banki!?"; Transliteration: "Enjin Banki!?" (Japanese: 炎神バンキ！？)	Kenji Konuta	November 2, 2008
38	"The Maidens' Seriousness"; Transliteration: "Otome no Honki" (Japanese: 乙女ノホンキ)	Junki Takegami	November 9, 2008
39	"Nostalgic Children"; Transliteration: "Kyōshū no Kodomo" (Japanese: 郷愁ノコドモ)	Shō Aikawa	November 16, 2008
40	"Shogun Revival"; Transliteration: "Shōgun Fukkatsu" (Japanese: 将軍フッカツ)	Shō Aikawa	November 23, 2008
41	"Advanced Childcare"; Transliteration: "Ikuji no Susume" (Japanese: 育児ノススメ)	Jun'ichi Miyashita	November 30, 2008
42	"Campus Secret"; Transliteration: "Gakuen no Himitsu" (Japanese: 学園ノヒミツ)	Junki Takegami	December 7, 2008
43	"Year-End Big Cleanup"; Transliteration: "Nenmatsu Osōji" (Japanese: 年末オソウジ)	Junki Takegami	December 14, 2008
44	"Protect Christmas Eve"; Transliteration: "Seiya o Mamore" (Japanese: 聖夜ヲマモレ)	Kenji Konuta	December 21, 2008
45	"Hatsuyume Plans!?"; Transliteration: "Hatsuyume Kikaku!?" (Japanese: 初夢キカク！？)	Miyako Hatano	January 4, 2009
46	"Runaway Bomper"; Transliteration: "Iede Bonpā" (Japanese: 家出ボンパー)	Satoko Yoshimoto	January 11, 2009
47	"Ministry Shake-Up"; Transliteration: "Naikaku Kaizō" (Japanese: 内閣カイゾウ)	Junki Takegami	January 18, 2009
48	"Justice Dissolution"; Transliteration: "Seigi Kaisan" (Japanese: 正義カイサン)	Satoko Yoshimoto	January 25, 2009
49	"Final Battle"; Transliteration: "Saishū Kessen" (Japanese: 最終ケッセン)	Junki Takegami	February 1, 2009
50 (Final)	"Road of Justice"; Transliteration: "Seigi no Rōdo" (Japanese: 正義ノロード)	Junki Takegami	February 8, 2009

== Films and Specials ==
=== Theatrical ===
==== Boom Boom! Bang Bang! GekijōBang!! ====
Engine Sentai Go-onger: Boom Boom! Bang Bang! GekijōBang!! (炎神戦隊ゴーオンジャー ＢＵＮＢＵＮ！ＢＡＮＢＡＮ！劇場ＢＡＮＧ！！, Enjin Sentai Gōonjā Bunbun! Banban! Gekijōban!!) was released in theaters on August 9, 2008, as a double bill with Kamen Rider Kiva: King of the Castle in the Demon World. The film features guest stars Sonim, Jyunichi Haruta (previously in Kagaku Sentai Dynaman and Dai Sentai Goggle V), Kento Handa (previously in Kamen Rider 555), Mika Kikuchi (previously in Tokusou Sentai Dekaranger), Naoya Uchida (previously in Denshi Sentai Denziman), and Masaya Matsukaze (previously in Denji Sentai Megaranger).

==== Shinkenger vs. Go-onger: GinmakuBang!! ====
Samurai Sentai Shinkenger vs. Go-onger: GinmakuBang!! (侍戦隊シンケンジャーVSゴーオンジャー銀幕BANG!!, Samurai Sentai Shinkenjā Bui Esu Gōonjā Ginmakuban) was released in theaters on January 30, 2010, featuring a crossover between the Samurai Sentai Shinkenger and Go-onger casts and characters. The heroes of Tensou Sentai Goseiger also make a cameo appearance in the film.

=== V-Cinema ===
==== Go-onger vs. Gekiranger ====
Engine Sentai Go-onger vs. Gekiranger (炎神戦隊ゴーオンジャーVSゲキレンジャー, Enjin Sentai Gōonjā tai Gekirenjā), released on DVD on May 24, 2009, features the return of Hiroki Suzuki, Mina Fukui, Manpei Takagi, Riki Miura, Sotaro, Hirofumi Araki, Yuka Hirata, Naoki Kawano, and Kazue Itoh reprising their roles as Jyan Kandou, Ran Uzaki, Retu Fukami, Gou Fukami, Ken Hisatsu, Rio, Mere, Long, and Miki Masaki from Juken Sentai Gekiranger. The story features the Three Gaiark Ministers and their Nunchaku Banki (ヌンチャクバンキ) teaming up with the last remaining member of the Confrontation Beast Hall (臨獣殿, Rinjūden), Meka (メカ), practicer of the Confrontation Beast Tortoise Fist (臨獣トータス拳, Rinjū Tōtasuken) who is after the golden orb that Long was sealed in. To defeat their common foes, the Go-ongers, the Go-on Wings, and the Gekirangers team up with the revived Rio and Mere to fight the new evil team and stop them from releasing Long.

==== 10 Years Grand Prix ====
Engine Sentai Go-onger: 10 Years Grand Prix (炎神戦隊ゴーオンジャー 10 YEARS GRANDPRIX, Enjin Sentai Gōonjā Ten Iyāzu Guran Puri) was released direct-to-video on September 26, 2018, to commemorate the 10th anniversary of the premiere of the series, unlike the two other 10 Years After films Ninpuu Sentai Hurricaneger: 10 Years After and Tokusou Sentai Dekaranger: 10 Years After which take place 10 years after the finale.

=== Other Specials ===
==== It's a Seminar! Everyone Go-on!! ====
It's a Seminar! Everyone Go-on!! (ゼミナールだよ！全員GO-ON!!, Zemināru da yo! Zen'in Gō On!!) is a special DVD in which Bomper lets each of the Go-ongers do their own special seminar on ecology and also tie into the three Gaiark Pollution Ministers. Sōsuke and Gunpei start by helping Renn show how water and oil can't be mixed as Speedor covers Kegalesia and her Water Pollution Barbaric Machine Beasts. Then Hanto shows how clean air is essential for people in an exercise experiment that nearly suffocates Gunpei from breathing in too much polluted air and being saved by inhaling helium by mistake as Speedor explains about Kitaneydas and his Air Pollution Barbaric Machine Beasts along with the Go-on Wings. After Gunpei's voice returns to normal, Saki begins her lesson though unaware she was supposed to teach a lesson though she grew strawberries from polluted soil and made a cake from strawberries that she grew in clean soil. As Sōsuke and Gunpei get the tea for her, Speedor talks about Yogostien and his Land Pollution Barbaric Machine Beasts, as well Hiramechimedes and all the events leading to Yogostein's death. The last seminar is cut short when Hiramechimedes' cross-dressing older brother Kokorootomedes goes after Sōsuke out of revenge, but is destroyed by Go-on Red's Kankan Kong Express Speedor Version after a tough fight. Just as Gunpei decides to give a seminar on how to be cool like himself, Bomper says that they are out of time and the seminars are over. The events of the specials take place between GPs 37 and 38.

== Cast ==
The first kana in the Go-ongers' surnames spell ecology (「え・こ・ろ・じ・い」（エコロジー） "E-Ko-Ro-Ji-I" (ekorojī)). Given that the additional two rangers, the Go-On Wings, share the surname of Suto, the word that the kana spells out then becomes Ecologist (「え・こ・ろ・じ・い・すとう」（エコロジスト） "E-Ko-Ro-Ji-I-Sutō" (ekorojisuto)).

- Sōsuke Esumi (江角 走輔, Esumi Sōsuke): Yasuhisa Furuhara (古原 靖久, Furuhara Yasuhisa)
- Renn Kōsaka (香坂 連, Kōsaka Ren): Shinwa Kataoka (片岡 信和, Kataoka Shinwa)
- Saki Rōyama (楼山 早輝, Rōyama Saki): Rina Aizawa (逢沢 りな, Aizawa Rina)
- Hanto Jō (城 範人, Jō Hanto): Masahiro Usui (碓井 将大, Usui Masahiro)
- Gunpei Ishihara (石原 軍平, Ishihara Gunpei): Kenji Ebisawa (海老澤 健次, Ebisawa Kenji)
- Hiroto Sutō (須塔 大翔, Sutō Hiroto): Hidenori Tokuyama (徳山 秀典, Tokuyama Hidenori)
- Miu Sutō (須塔 美羽, Sutō Miu): Yumi Sugimoto (杉本 有美, Sugimoto Yumi)
- Water Pollution Minister Kegalesia (害水大臣ケガレシア, Gaisui Daijin Kegareshia): Nao Oikawa (及川 奈央, Oikawa Nao)
  - Oikawa also had a cameo appearance in the final episode as Nao Shimizu (清水 奈央, Shimizu Nao), a customer, at Saki's bakery.

=== Voice cast ===
- Engine Speedor (炎神スピードル, Enjin Supīdoru): Daisuke Namikawa (浪川 大輔, Namikawa Daisuke)
- Engine Bus-on (炎神バスオン, Enjin Basuon): Hisao Egawa (江川 央生, Egawa Hisao)
- Engine BearRV (炎神ベアールV(ブイ), Enjin Beārubui): Miki Inoue (井上 美紀, Inoue Miki)
- Engine Birca (炎神バルカ, Enjin Baruka): Sōichirō Hoshi (保志 総一朗, Hoshi Sōichirō)
- Engine Gunpherd (炎神ガンパード, Enjin Ganpādo): Kenji Hamada (浜田 賢二, Hamada Kenji)
- Engine Carrigator (炎神キャリゲーター, Enjin Kyarigētā): Kyousei Tsukui (津久井 教生, Tsukui Kyōsei)
- Engine Toripter (炎神トリプター, Enjin Toriputā): Shizuka Ishikawa (石川 静, Ishikawa Shizuka)
- Engine Jetras (炎神ジェットラス, Enjin Jettorasu): Kiyotaka Furushima (古島 清孝, Furushima Kiyotaka)
- Engine Jum-bowhale (炎神ジャン・ボエール, Enjin Janboēru): Tomomichi Nishimura (西村 知道, Nishimura Tomomichi)
- Bomper (ボンパー, Bonpā): Akiko Nakagawa (中川 亜紀子, Nakagawa Akiko)
- Land Pollution Minister Yogostein (害地大臣ヨゴシュタイン, Gaichi Daijin Yogoshutain), Crime Minister Yogoshimacritein (総裏大臣ヨゴシマクリタイン, Sōridaijin Yogoshimakuritain): Kiyoyuki Yanada (梁田 清之, Yanada Kiyoyuki)
- Air Pollution Minister Kitaneydas (害気大臣キタネイダス, Gaiki Daijin Kitaneidasu): Mitsuaki Madono (真殿 光昭, Madono Mitsuaki)
- Land Pollution Vice-Minister Hiramechimedes (害地副大臣ヒラメキメデス, Gaichi Fukudaijin Hiramekimedesu): Kazuya Nakai (中井 和哉, Nakai Kazuya)

=== Guest cast ===
- Seiji Ogawa (小川征爾, Ogawa Seiji; 6): Keisuke Minami (南 圭介, Minami Keisuke)
- Tōjirō Fuji (冨士 東次郎, Fuji Tōjirō; 8): Ryū Manatsu (真夏竜, Manatsu Ryū)
- Boss Dokkūgo (ドックーゴ親分, Dokkūgo-oyabun; 13): Shun Sugata (菅田 俊, Sugata Shun)
- Nokogiri Banki (ノコギリバンキ, Nokogiri Banki; Voice; 19, 20): Takayuki Godai (五代 高之, Godai Takayuki)
- Osen (オーセン, Ōsen; 27): Hana Kino (木野花, Kino Hana)
- Rairaiken (雷々剱; Voice; 39, 40): Naoya Uchida (内田 直哉, Uchida Naoya)
- Gokugokumaru (獄々丸, G; Voice; 39, 40): Masaya Matsukaze (松風 雅也, Matsukaze Masaya)
- Retsu-Taka (烈鷹, Retsutaka; 40): Kento Handa (半田 健人, Handa Kento)
- Dumbbell Banki (ダンベルバンキ, Danberu Banki; Voice; 46): Yuji Kishi (岸 祐二, Kishi Yūji)

== Songs ==
Opening theme

- "Engine Sentai Go-onger" (炎神戦隊ゴーオンジャー, Enjin Sentai Gōonjā)
  - Lyrics: Mike Sugiyama (マイク スギヤマ, Maiku Sugiyama)
  - Composition: Takafumi Iwasaki
  - Arrangement: Project. R (Keinichiro Ōishi & Takafumi Iwasaki)
  - Artist: Hideyuki Takahashi (高橋 秀幸, Takahashi Hideyuki; Project.R)

Ending themes

- "Engine First Lap -Type Normal-" (炎神ファーストラップ-Type Normal-, Enjin Fāsuto Rappu -Taipu Nōmaru-; 1-21, 26 & 47-49) (Note: In Japanese, there is no phoneme for what resembles the English L or the English R, but a consonant in between. The word rappu (ラップ) may be translated as both lap and rap.)
  - Lyrics: Mike Sugiyama & Saburo Yatsude (八手 三郎, Yatsude Saburō)
  - Composition & Arrangement: Kenichiro Ōishi (Project. R)
  - Artist: Project.R (Takayoshi Tanimoto (谷本 貴義, Tanimoto Takayoshi), Sister MAYO, Kenichiro Ōishi (大石 憲一郎, Ōishi Ken'ichirō)) with the Engine Kids (炎神キッズ, Enjin Kizzu)

Starting with episode 9 to 13, and 15 to 17, the second verse from "Engine First Lap -Type Normal-" was used as the ending theme, switching from the verse about Speedor to the verse about Bus-on. BearRV's verse was used as the ending theme in episode 18.

- "Engine Second Lap -TURBO CUSTOM-" (炎神セカンドラップ-TURBO CUSTOM-, Enjin Sekando Rappu -Tābo Kasutamu-; 22, 27-30, 32-35 & 46)
  - Lyrics: Mike Sugiyama & Saburo Yatsude (八手 三郎, Yatsude Saburō)
  - Composition & Arrangement: Kenichiro Ōishi (Project. R)
  - Artist: Project. R (Hideaki Takatori (高取 ヒデアキ, Takatori Hideaki), Mayumi Gojo (五條 真由美, Gojō Mayumi), Takayoshi Tanimoto, Sister MAYO, Kenichiro Ōishi) with the Engine Kids

Starting with episode 22, the third verse from "Engine Second Lap -TURBO CUSTOM-", Carrigator's verse, was used as the ending theme as a way to promote the movie. It was played again, from episodes 27 to 30, with Birca's verse. It then was resumed, in episode 32, with Gunpherd's verse.

- "Engine Eco Lap -Recycle Custom-" (炎神エコラップ-Recycle Custom-, Enjin Eko Rappu -Risaikuru Kasutamu-; 23 & 24, It's a Seminar! Everyone GO-ON)
  - Lyrics: Mike Sugiyama
  - Composition & Arrangement: Kenichiro Ōishi
  - Artist: Engine Kids with Project. R (Takayoshi Tanimoto, Sister MAYO, Kenichiro Ōishi)

This version of the ending theme, first used at the end of episode 23 and later used as the ending theme to the It's a Seminar! Everyone GO-ON DVD features the Engine Kids singing and members of Project. R singing back up. As the title suggests, the song discusses ecology and recycling.

- "Engine Formation Lap -GekijōBang! Custom-" (炎神フォーメーションラップ-劇場BANG! CUSTOM-, Enjin Fōmēshon Rappu -Gekijōban! Kasutamu-; 25 & Movie)
  - Lyrics: Mike Sugiyama
  - Composition & Arrangement: Kenichiro Ōishi
  - Artist: Project. R (Takayoshi Tanimoto, Hideaki Takatori, Sister MAYO, Hideyuki Takahashi, Takafumi Iwasaki, YOFFY, Mayumi Gojo, Kenichiro Ōishi) with Engine the Kids

This version of the ending theme, first used at the end of episode 25, is also the ending theme for the movie.

- "G3 Princess Lap ~PRETTY LOVE♡Limited~" (G3プリンセス ラップ～PRETTY LOVE♡Limited～, Jī Surī Purinsesu Rappu ~Puriti Rabu Rimiteddo~; 31)
  - Lyrics: Mike Sugiyama
  - Composition & Arrangement: Kenichiro Ōishi
  - Artist: "G3 Princess" (G3プリンセス, Jī Surī Purinsesu; Saki Rōyama Rina Aizawa, Miu Sutō Yumi Sugimoto, Kegalesia Nao Oikawa)

This version of the ending theme is used in episode 31 as both an insert song and an ending theme, featuring the G3 Princess idol group (Saki, Miu, and Kegalesia) singing. Included in G3 Princess CD Box set, there will be an arrangement of "G3 Princess Lap ~PRETTY LOVE☆Limited~" for each of the members of G3 Princess as well as their character songs. The G3 Princess Lap ~PRETTY LOVE☆Limited~ mini-album also includes the title song, the character songs, as well as "Engine Sentai Go-onger," "Engine First Lap -Type Normal," and "Engine Eco Lap -RECYCLE CUSTOM-."

- "Engine Third Lap -AERO-Dynamic CUSTOM-" (炎神サードラップ-AERO-Dynamic CUSTOM-, Enjin Sādo Rappu -Earo-Dainamikku Kasutamu-; 36-41)
  - Lyrics: Mike Sugiyama & Saburo Yatsude (八手 三郎, Yatsude Saburō)
  - Composition & Arrangement: Kenichiro Ōishi (Project.R)
  - Artist: Project.R (YOFFY, Takafumi Iwasaki (岩崎 貴文, Iwasaki Takafumi), Hideaki Takatori, Mayumi Gojo, Takayoshi Tanimoto, Sister MAYO, Kenichiro Ōishi) with the Engine Kids

Starting with episode 36 to 37, the first verse, Toripter's verse, was used. Then as of episodes 38 and 39, the second verse, Jetras' verse, was used as the ending theme. In episode 40, the third verse, Jum-bowhale's verse, was used. Psychic Lover (サイキックラバー, Saikikku Rabā) is also noted as the artist of the song on the complete song collection.

- "Engine Final Lap -Type Evolution-" (炎神ファイナルラップ-Type Evolution-, Enjin Fainaru Rappu-Taipu Eboryūshon-; 42-44)
  - Lyrics: Mike Sugiyama & Saburo Yatsude (八手 三郎, Yatsude Saburō)
  - Composition & Arrangement: Kenichiro Ōishi (Project.R)
  - Artist: Project.R (Hideyuki Takahashi, Takayoshi Tanimoto, Sister MAYO, Kenichiro Ōishi) with the Engine Kids

Starting with episode 42, the first verse, Kishamoth's verse, was used. In episode 43, it was switched to T-line's verse, the second verse. Then K-line's verse, the third verse, was used in episode 44. It was included on the complete song collection, released on January 14, 2009, which came with a toy Engine Soul that plays the ending theme melody.

- "G5 Prince Lap ~Bombaye★Limited~" (G5プリンスラップ～BONバイエ★Limited～, Jī Faibu Purinsu Rappu ~Bonbaie★Rimiteddo; 45)
  - Lyrics: Mike Sugiyama & Saburo Yatsude (八手 三郎, Yatsude Saburō)
  - Composition & Arrangement: Kenichiro Ōishi (Project.R)
  - Artist: G5 Prince (G5プリンス, Jī Faibu Purinsu; Sōsuke Esumi [Yasuhisa Furuhara], Renn Kōsaka [Shinwa Kataoka], Hant Jō [Masahiro Usui], Gunpei Ishihara [Kenji Ebisawa], Hiroto Sutō [Hidenori Tokuyama]) with Bomper (Akiko Nakagawa)
- "Engine Winning Run -Type Formula-" (炎神ウイニングラン-Type Formula-, Enjin Uiningu Ran -Taipu Fōmyura-; 50)
  - Lyrics: Mike Sugiyama & Saburo Yatsude (八手 三郎, Yatsude Saburō)
  - Composition & Arrangement: Kenichiro Ōishi (Project.R)
  - Artist: Project.R (Hideyuki Takahashi, Takayoshi Tanimoto, Sister MAYO, Hideaki Takatori, Mayumi Gojo, YOFFY, Takafumi Iwasaki, IMAJO, Kenichiro Ōishi) with Engine Kids

The single of the opening and ending themes comes in two versions, one of which is the limited edition "Engine Soul Set" (炎神ソウルセット, Enjin Sōru Setto) version that includes a limited edition toy Engine Soul that plays the opening theme melody. It is the first Super Sentai theme song single to ever make it onto the Oricon charts' top ten list, reaching #4 on the weekly singles chart by selling 22,000 records in its first week. It had started out at #3 on the daily singles chart on its first day of sale, March 19, 2008, peaking at #2 on March 20, 2008. It had remained in the top 20 of the weekly charts for four weeks, and became the #113 top selling single on the Oricon's yearly rankings. As part of a Kodomo no Hi report, the Oricon listed "Engine Sentai Go-onger" as the #1 tokusatsu hero karaoke request, ahead of songs such as AAA DEN-O form's "Climax Jump" for Kamen Rider Den-O and V6's "TAKE ME HIGHER" for Ultraman Tiga.

A final album was released for Go-onger on March 18, 2009, which included all of the character songs in the series, including versions of "G3 Princess Lap" performed as a group and by each individual member, "Smile×Smile" performed by Rina Aizawa, "Yume no Tsubasa" (夢の翼; "Dream Wings") performed by Yumi Sugimoto, "Utopia" (桃源郷（ユートピア）, Yūtopia) performed by Nao Oikawa, "G5 Prince Rap", versions of "Kimi to Gyutto♪" (君とギュッと♪; "Holding You Tight♪") performed by G5 Prince and each of the individual members, "miss you" performed by Hidenori Tokuyama for episode 31, and "Engine Special Lap" (炎神スペシャルラップ, Enjin Supesharu Rappu) by Project.R, featuring "Engine First Lap", "Engine Second Lap", "Engine Third Lap", "Engine Final Lap", and "Engine Winning Run" as a single song.
