= Juken Sentai Gekiranger: Nei-Nei! Hou-Hou! Hong Kong Decisive Battle =

2007 Japanese-Hong Kong film by Shōjirō Nakazawa

- Film poster for both Juken Sentai Gekiranger: Nei-Nei! Hou-Hou! Hong Kong Decisive Battle and Kamen Rider Den-O: I'm Born!

Japanese name
- Kanji: 電影版 獣拳戦隊ゲキレンジャー ネイネイ!ホウホウ!香港大決戦
Transcriptions
- Revised Hepburn: Den'eiban Jūken Sentai Gekirenjā: Nei-Nei! Hō-Hō! Honkon Daikessen
- Directed by: Shōjirō Nakazawa
- Written by: Naruhisa Arakawa
- Based on: Juken Sentai Gekiranger by Michiko Yokote
- Produced by: Toei Company
- Starring: Hiroki Suzuki; Mina Fukui; Manpei Takagi; Hirofumi Araki; Yuka Hirata; Mayumi Ono; Yinling; Masashi Ishibashi
- Narrated by: Kei Grant
- Cinematography: Fumio Matsumura
- Edited by: Ren Sato
- Music by: Kazunori Miyake
- Distributed by: Toei Company; Shaw Brothers
- Release date: August 4, 2007
- Running time: 33 minutes
- Countries: Japan; Hong Kong
- Languages: Japanese; Cantonese; English

Movie Edition Juken Sentai Gekiranger: Nei-Nei! Hou-Hou! Hong Kong Decisive Battle (電影版 獣拳戦隊ゲキレンジャー ネイネイ!ホウホウ!香港大決戦, Den'eiban Jūken Sentai Gekirenjā: Nei-Nei! Hō-Hō! Honkon Daikessen) is the theatrical superhero film adaptation of the Super Sentai series' Juken Sentai Gekiranger television tokusatsu drama directed by Shōjirō Nakazawa and written by Naruhisa Arakawa. It premiered in Japanese theaters on August 4, 2007, with the Kamen Rider Series' film Kamen Rider Den-O: I'm Born!. The movie's title comes from the Cantonese pronunciation of Ni hao (Mandarin for "hello"), as Cantonese is the de facto dialect of Hong Kong.

== Plot ==
While in the middle of fighting, the Gekirangers and Mere are teleported to Hong Kong, along with Rio and various other martial artists around the world. Just as Rio and Jyan were about to fight, they meet the mysterious Lao Fan before seeing others brought to the island as well. They all then meet Miranda, the secretary to Yang, a media mogul who brought them all together for the Kenkonitteki Martial Arts Tournament (乾坤一擲武術会, Kenkonitteki Bujutsukai) to prove who's the strongest of them all. The first round of fighting leaves the Gekirangers, their Rinjūken rivals, Lao, Barnard Koyama, and Big the Goto as the winners. At the banquet hall, Ran, Retu, Rio, and Mere meet Yang Lo himself while Jyan follow Lao Fan and learns she's actually a member of the Hong Kong police who is investigating Yang, who founded Mechung Fu and used his tournament to gather strongest fighters as part of his plan to rule the world, finding the ideal Ki he needs: from the Jūken users. Geki Blue, Geki Yellow, Rio, and Mere attempt to fight off Miranda as Yang takes his leave, finding Jyan and Lao in his base of operations before they restrained him. However, the Ki Miranda collected before she died transfers to Yang's computer, transforming Yang into a cyborg Beastman before he starts absorbing more Ki to become a supreme being. The Gekirangers battle Yang Lo, refusing to give up in spite of him being stronger than them. Evading his defeat, Yan activates his giant robot Mechannon to terrorize the city. When GekiTohja proves no match for Mechannon, Rio and Mere take offense to Yang's comments on the Jūken style and are forced to help the Gekirangers by summoning Rin Lion and Rin Chameleon to combine with GekiTohja to form GekiRinTohja to destroy Mechannon, killing Yang in the process. Once the fight is over, in spite of the Gekirangers' amazement at the power of the united Jūken schools, Rio takes his leave with Mere telling them that nothing changed between them. The next day, Lao thanks the Gekirangers as they were about to leave for Japan when Miki, Natsume, and Xia Fu arrive for a vacation in Hong Kong.

== Characters ==
=== From series ===
- Jyan Kandou (漢堂 ジャン, Kandō Jan) / Geki Red (ゲキレッド, Geki Reddo)
- Ran Uzaki (宇崎 ラン, Uzaki Ran) / Geki Yellow (ゲキイエロー, Geki Ierō)
- Retsu Fukami (深見 レツ, Fukami Retsu) / Geki Blue (ゲキブルー, Geki Burū)
- Master Xia Fu (マスター・シャーフー, Masutā Shā Fū)
- Miki Masaki (真咲 美希, Masaki Miki)
- Natsume Masaki (真咲 なつめ, Masaki Natsume)
- Rio (理央) / Black Lion Rio (黒獅子リオ, Kurojishi Rio)
- Mere (メレ, Mere)
- Bae (バエ, Bae)

=== Film only ===
- Hong Kong Interpol Officer Lao Fan (香港国際警察ラオファン, Honkon Kokusai Keisatsu Rao Fan): A local Interpol officer who meets the Gekirangers, Rio, and Mere on Yan's island where she is trying to discover Yan's plans. She uses nunchaku to fight, like Jyan.

==== Mechung Fu ====
Practitioners of Mechung Fu (銘功夫（メカンフー）, Mekanfū) are composed of robots with the exception of their founder Yang, who claims his creation is superior to Jūken.

- Hong Kong Media King Yang (香港のメディア王ヤン, Honkon Media Ō Yan): Founder of Mechung Fu and master of Mechung Fu Antlion-Ken (銘功夫アントライオン拳, Mekanfū Antoraionken). He uses his position to hide his true intent: gathering the Qi of the fighters as part of his plan to become the strongest being and rule the world. He succeeds and becomes a cyborg Beastman as a result. His fighting style includes Sand Castle (砂楼閣, Sarōkaku), creating a sandpit to drag his opponents into. He ends up dying in Mechanon when it was destroyed by GekiRinTohja.
- Yang's Secretary Miranda (ヤンの秘書ミランダ, Yan no Hisho Miranda): Yang's assistant who is actually a Machine-Man that mastered the Mechung Fu Sea Anemone-Ken (銘功夫シーアネモネ拳, Mekanfū Shīanemoneken), able to use her Petal Missile (花弁ミサイル, Kaben Misairu) for offense and to find martial artists to bring to Yang. Form there, she uses her Super Absorbing Qi (超吸気, Chōkyūki) to drain her opponents dry of their qi, to power Yang's transformation, getting the last amount from Rio as he killed her.
- Machine-Men (機械人, Kikaijin): Robots created by Yang.
- Mechannon (銘観音（メカンノン）, Mekannon): The giant antlion robot piloted by Yang, hidden in plain sight as stone statue of Guan Yin. Mechung Drop (銘観落とし, Mekan Otoshi) and Mechung Violent Wind Slash (銘観烈風斬, Mekan Reppū Zan) are used before GekiRinTohja scrapped it.

== Cast ==
- Jyan Kandou/Geki Red: Hiroki Suzuki (鈴木 裕樹, Suzuki Hiroki)
- Ran Uzaki/Geki Yellow: Mina Fukui (福井 未菜, Fukui Mina)
- Retu Fukami/Geki Blue: Manpei Takagi (高木 万平, Takagi Manpei)
- Xia Fu (Voice): Ichirō Nagai (永井 一郎, Nagai Ichirō)
- Miki Masaki: Kazue Itō (伊藤 かずえ, Itō Kazue)
- Natsume Masaki: Sakina Kuwae (桑江 咲菜, Kuwae Sakina)
- Rio: Hirofumi Araki (荒木 宏文, Araki Hirofumi)
- Mere: Yuka Hirata (平田 裕香, Hirata Yuka)
- Bae (Voice): Akira Ishida (石田 彰, Ishida Akira)
- Lao Fan: Mayumi Ono (小野 真弓, Ono Mayumi)
- Miranda: Yinling (インリン・オブ・ジョイトイ, Inrin obu Joitoi)
- Yang: Masashi Ishibashi (石橋 雅史, Ishibashi Masashi)
- Narrator: Kei Grant (ケイ・グラント, Kei Guranto)
