= Mayumi Ono =

Mayumi Ono may refer to:

- Mayumi Ono (field hockey)
- Mayumi Ono (actress)
