= List of Juken Sentai Gekiranger episodes =

This is a list of Juken Sentai Gekiranger episodes. Each episode is called a Lesson (修行, Shugyō) and contains a word from Jyan's personal vocabulary and features a Chinese character's seal script in the titles.

== Episodes ==
No.	Title	Directed by	Written by	Central character	Original release date
1	"Niki-Niki! Geki Jūken"; Transliteration: "Niki-Niki! Geki Jūken" (Japanese: ニキニキ！激獣拳)	Shojiro Nakazawa	Michiko Yokote	Jyan or whole Gekiranger team	February 18, 2007
On a lunar eclipse that occurs every 500 years, the Kenma Bracelet must be sealed at area surrounding the Jūken Life Tree. But, Geki Jū Leopard-Ken user Miki Misaki encounters a wild child named Jyan Kandou before she is attacked by a group of Akugata martial artists led by Rin Jū Mantis-Ken user Makirika, who steals the Bracelet. Then, the leader of Rin Jū Hall, Rio, obeying the souls of the long dead founders of the Rin Jūken style, starts their plans to conquer the world by first amassing Rinki energy from the terror inflicted on humans. However, the Grand Master of the Geki Jūken style, Kensei Xia Fu, along with Miki have been prepared for this coming battle and were training two young fighters: Geki Jū Cheetah-Ken practitioner Ran Uzaki and Geki Jū Jaguar-Ken user Retsu Fukami. Jyan joins the other two warriors in forming the Gekiranger team. However, they face Makirika, now a Beast-Man after absorbing enough Rinki. Though Jyan manages to defeat Makirika with Geki Jū Tiger-Ken, the Beast-Man soon grows into a giant.
2	"Waki-Waki! Jūken Combination"; Transliteration: "Waki-Waki! Jūken Gattai" (Japanese: ワキワキ！獣拳合体)	Shojiro Nakazawa	Michiko Yokote	Jyan or whole Gekiranger team	February 25, 2007
Xia Fu uses the Geki Waza Double-Double Clone Fist to create a giant version of himself that blew Giant Makirika away. Having seen this, Ran and Retsu ask Xia Fu to teach them the Geki Waza technique. Xia Fu responds saying that the way to obtain it is to first teach Jyan the Beast Arts. The two reluctantly start the training, but Jyan, bored with basic training, ran off with the Geki Nunchaku as Makirika makes his move by flooding the city with Rin Jū Chameleon-Ken Mistress Mele to overview his progress. However, the three managed to master the Double-Double Clone Fist by joining their unique attributes to create the Geki Beasts and formed GekiTohja, who defeated Makirika with Mele and her captive, Geki Jū Fly-Ken user Bae, as witnesses (Bae commentates on the fight). With that settled, Jyan decides to stay with SCRTC until his birth parents are found.
3	"Shio-Shio! Cleaning Power"; Transliteration: "Shio-Shio! Sōjiryoku" (Japanese: シオシオ！そうじ力)	Katsuya Watanabe	Michiko Yokote	Rio	March 4, 2007
Jyan, unbearably happy from the Geki Jūken training, receives a special "training exercise" from Xia Fu that would let him fully master his Geki Waza: Cleaning. Meanwhile, Rin Jū Buffalo-Ken user Gyuuya, has just passed the challenges within the Chamber of Trials and begins his assault on the city once he perfected himself. Though Gyuuya had the upper hand in their first encounter, Jyan defeated him with "Cleaning Power" he obtained from his training. But despite GekiTohja defeating Gyuuya with the Great Firm Kick, Rio called forth the elite Rinrinshi known as the Five Venom-Ken to defeat the Gekirangers.
4	"Zowa-Zowa! The Five Venom-Ken"; Transliteration: "Zowa-Zowa! Godokuken" (Japanese: ゾワゾワ！五毒拳)	Katsuya Watanabe	Michiko Yokote	Ran	March 11, 2007
Jyan and company are brought to a skating rink where they must acquire a difficult lesson, meeting professional skater Junko Yaginuma to master the Kaleido Spiral Jump. However, the Five Venom-Ken begin their fight against the Gekirangers, overpowering them until Xia Fu saved them. However, it was a ploy set up by Rio to deal with Xia Fu himself with his Rin Jū Lion-Ken style, revealing the link between them as not only master and apprentice but rivals based on his dream visions. However, Rio soon learns that his destined rival is not Xia Fu, but Jyan. To confirm this, he had Jyan poisoned, forcing him and the others to fight all Five Venom-Ken members at once in GekiTohja for the antidote. But the Gekirangers managed to master the Kaleido Spiral Jump in time to get the cure, with Rio calling off the attack for now.
5	"Uja-Uja! What Should I Do?"; Transliteration: "Uja-Uja! Dōsuryaīno?" (Japanese: ウジャウジャ！どーすりゃいいの？)	Noboru Takemoto	Michiko Yokote	Retsu	March 18, 2007
Jyan is uneased by both the Venom-Ken and especially Rio. To remedy the anxiety, Xia Fu has Jyan undergo another training session by learning from Ran. However, Rin Jū Centipede-Ken user Kademu of the Five Venom-Ken begins to attack people with his high-speed fists and poisoned Retu. With Jyan forced to watch, Ran challenges Kademu in a duel of high-speed martial arts, the Thousand-Kens Many Strikes competition. Though he won, postponing his fight with Ran on account of wind, Ran was the true winner as she was more accurate than Kademu. Enraged, Kademu fights the Gekirangers in full fury and was destroyed by GekiTohja. Even more, with Kademu dead, the remaining four are suspected of possessing the Ringi Rio needs to hear the Kenma once more.
6	"Juwān! What's That?"; Transliteration: "Juwān! 'tte, Nani?" (Japanese: ジュワーン！って、何？)	Noboru Takemoto	Michiko Yokote	Jyan or whole Gekiranger team	March 25, 2007
A strange picture dealer named Pierre Fujishiro comes to SCRTC to obtain a painting from Retu, which is still incomplete. As Retu's past is unveiled, Rin Jū Gecko-Ken user Moriya of the Five Venom-Ken arrives to cause havoc. The Gekirangers intervene, but are overwhelmed by Moriya's unpredictable tactics and fighting style, forcing them to retreat. During another training session involving window-washing, Ran reveals to Jyan that just fighting to win is not always Retu's goal; to him, true victory is obtained when he beats his opponent at their own game. In their second encounter, Retu manages to knock Moriya off his wall with artistic feeling at his side, forcing a fight between him and GekiTohja. Moriya reveals his Secret Ringi, Rapid-Growth Arm, much to the chagrin of Mere, as she assumed that Moriya was the True Poison user. Regardless, he is destroyed much to Mere's dismay, with only three left to spy on. Retu soon completed his painting afterward with Pierre asking to have it.
7	"Shuba-Shuba Dancing!"; Transliteration: "Shuba-Shuba Odorou!" (Japanese: シュバシュバ踊ろう！)	Shojiro Nakazawa	Naruhisa Arakawa	Jyan or whole Gekiranger team	April 1, 2007
Miki's daughter Natsume visits the SCRTC offices before her dance lessons, saying she has quit the team. At the same time, Rin Jū Scorpion-Ken user Sorisa of the Five Venom-Ken wreaks havoc on the city, using her troop of dancing Rinshis to incite fear among the humans. The Gekirangers attempt to fight Sorisa with little luck before Rin Jū Toad-Ken user Maga (who has feelings for Sorisa) intervened because he thought Retu and Sorisa were making out. Though GekiTohja was unable to kill him, Maga retreated upon learning Sorisa walked off in a huff during the fight, with Mere deciding to help him. To oppose the dance-styles of Sorisa, the Gekirangers must learn some dancing moves themselves from Natsume's teacher. Once the Gekirangers get the hang of dancing with Jyan's Shuba-Shuba style, they take a rest and watch Natsume's class practice. They all notice that Natsume is not dancing like the others, and Jyan realizes that it is because she does not have "Shuba-Shuba" or feeling in her dancing. Natsume storms out and Miki tries to reassure her, until they are attacked by Sorisa and her Rinshis. Miki holds them off until the Gekirangers arrive and counter with their dancing. At first, the Gekirangers were able to counter Sorisa, but when Maga arrives with love-confidence from Mere, he and Sorisa quickly gain the upper hand by bringing his defense and her offense together into a devastating tag-team.
8	"Koto-Koto… Intently Koto-Koto"; Transliteration: "Koto-Koto… Hitasura Koto-Koto" (Japanese: コトコト・・・ひたすらコトコト)	Shojiro Nakazawa	Naruhisa Arakawa	Mele	April 8, 2007
With the combined defense of Maga and offense of Sorisa, the Gekirangers were overwhelmed. To counter the powerful tag-team, the Geki Bazooka needs to be used despite still being incomplete. However, to perform the Geki Waza Fierce-Fierce Cannon, it must be charged within two minutes, leaving the Gekirangers open to attack. Thus Jyan must train so he can hold off both two Venom-Ken at once while Ran and Retu charge the weapon up with their Geki . But Jyan's need not to be "Boko-Boko" (beaten up) resulted with the first try a bust. But as Xia Fu endures the pain of training Ran and Retu himself, he has Natsume train Jyan in the wait department. When the Gekiranger encountered Maga and Sorisa once again, Jyan was able to hold them off long enough for the Geki Bazooka to fully charge up. The Gekirangers used the new weapon to destroy Maga and later fought and destroyed the irate Sorisa with GekiTohja's Great Spin-Spin Leg. Now only Rin Jū Snake-Ken user Braco of the Five Venom-Ken remains, and Rio's dreams are getting stronger by the minute to the snake's advantage.
9	"The Kena-Kena Woman"; Transliteration: "Kena-Kena no Onna" (Japanese: ケナケナの女)	Satoshi Morota	Genki Yoshimura	Jyan or whole Gekiranger team	April 15, 2007
After remembering her first meeting with Rio, Mere is encountered by Braco, who reveals his plans to assassinate Rio and offers her to join him. Mere refuses and angrily kills Braco, only to learn that he is the True Poison user when he used his power to revive himself after receiving the deathblow. After revealing that the True Poison can resurrect the dead, Braco easily defeats Mere while gloating that he will kill Rio during his most vulnerable state, while he is in deep meditation, with aid from the newly resurrected Moriya and Kademu. Mere, having survived the attack, purposely attacks the Gekirangers while they were training in order to goad them into using the Geki Bazooka on her to perfect herself for Rio's sake. Once she managed to learn how to deflect their attack, Jyan realizes that she is "Kena-Kena" (ambiguous in terms of affiliation). Meanwhile, Mere hurries to Rio's aid and holds herself until Rio awakens and effortlessly destroys Kademu. While Mere goes after Braco, a fearful Moriya flees to attempt to gather Rinki until the Gekirangers found him and defeated him for good. As for Mere, she managed to defeat Braco with her training until he explained why Rio wants the True Poison and how only three remain. Though swayed by the notion of being truly alive, Mere snaps Braco's fingers off and kills him on the spot while telling him she gets that feeling of "true life" by staying at Rio's side. Now with the three True Poison fangs, Rio is a step closer to his goal: To revive the Kenma and become stronger.
10	"Jara-Jara Attack! The First Errand"; Transliteration: "Jara-Jara Shūgeki! Hajimete no Otsukai" (Japanese: ジャラジャラ襲撃！はじめてのおつかい)	Satoshi Morota	Michiko Yokote	Ran	April 22, 2007
We open to the three Gekirangers walking through the forest to deliver a package to an old friend of Xia Fu's. Prior to it, the Gekirangers were fighting Rin Jū Pangolin-Ken user Muzankose who defeated GekiTohja before resuming his task of causing an earthquake. To stop Muzankose, Xia Fu sends them on an errand to a hut somewhere on Shibe Mountain, said to be haunted. But on their way, they encounter the Mononoke, who tied them up and took the package. Now mad, the Gekirangers change and pursue the Mononoke, forced to fight him to regain the package. But the mononoke's playful (and perverted) moves overwhelmed the Gekirangers. But despite losing to him, the three refused to give up and managed to turn the tables and regained the package. They soon learn the Mononoke is actually the Kensei known as Master Elehung Kam Po, a grand master of the Geki Jū Elephant-Ken. Elehung also revealed the item they had delivered to him was the Geki Hammer which Ran is to master to fight Muzankose. During all of this, Rio begins to travel to an ominous mountain where one of the Three Kenma rests while Mere has Muzankose to start the earthquake that would destroy the city.
11	"Ukya-Ukya! Jūken Armament"; Transliteration: "Ukya-Ukya! Jūken Busō" (Japanese: ウキャウキャ！獣拳武装)	Noboru Takemoto	Michiko Yokote	Rio	April 29, 2007
Ran begins to master the Elephant-Ken and the Geki Hammer under Master Elehung. However, Elehung's ideals and training methods differ from Xia Fu's own, thus confusing Ran while Jyan and Retu attempt to fight Muzankose without her. But the antics of Elehung managed to make Ran laugh while she was fly fishing, a part of her training, finally making a hit. Learning that happiness is a needed element in any situation, a "different" Ran uses the Geki Hammer to help her friends and defeat Muzankose in time. When Muzankose grew, Elehung tells the Gekirangers to use Ran's training to summon the legendary Geki Beast Geki Elephant, which combines with GekiTohja, forming Geki ElephanTohja and defeating Muzankose. However, as Xia Fu sensed, Rio managed to destroy the barrier that kept him from reviving the Sky Kenma: Rin Jū Hawk-Ken grand master Kata.
12	"Zowan-Zowan! Rin Jūken Training Starts"; Transliteration: "Zowan-Zowan! Rin Jūken, Shugyō Kaishi" (Japanese: ゾワンゾワン！臨獣拳、修行開始)	Noboru Takemoto	Shō Aikawa	Retsu	May 6, 2007
While wandering through the city, Jyan finds Natsume at a bathhouse looking at the carp windsocks. When the bathhouse's owner Gen-san confronts Jyan when he is trying to take down one of the windsocks, Natsume is accidentally sent flying towards the street as a result of Rin Jū Eel-Ken user Nagiu's Ringi. The Gekirangers try to fight, but he is too slippery to be hit by their attacks. Xia Fu sends the trio to train at the bathhouse, where they re-encounter Elehung and Gen-san who is revealed to be a master of "towel-style." Jyan learns how to use the "towel-style" and in the next fight with Nagiu, Jyan uses one of the carp windsocks to dry the Beast-Man of the slippery mucus, followed by the Geki Bazooka. Nagiu soon grows to his giant size, and the Gekirangers fight first as GekiTohja and then Geki ElephanTohja. Nagiu is ultimately defeated by the Great Firm-Firm Ball of Geki ElephanTohja. Elsewhere, Rio was trying to learn how to attain ultimate power from Kata in a battle to the death, and in the process is blasted by the Hawk-Ken master's Darkness Cannon and is placed within the event of his past that started his path in becoming a Rin Jūken user. Rio was able to absorb his own despair and breaks Kata's illusion, sparing Kata for enabling him to become stronger. By being beaten, Kata accepted Rio as a pupil to learn the full power of Rin Jūken Akugata.
13	"Shin-Shin! The Spirit's Dance"; Transliteration: "Shin-Shin! Seirei no Mai" (Japanese: シンシン！精霊の舞い)	Masato Tsujino	Genki Yoshimura	Retsu	May 13, 2007
To obtain the despair he needs to teach Rio to channel his hatred as power, Kata sends up his two bodyguards, the two Flying-Ken, to be his eyes while providing him more Rinki. Meanwhile, Xia Fu takes the Gekirangers to the ballet much to the dismay of Jyan (who falls asleep in boredom) and Ran and to the delight of Retu. In the middle of the performance, Jyan woke up and sensed the Flying-Ken attacking people, turning their fear into lightning for their plan to destroy the city and get more Rinki from it. The Flying-Ken, Rin Jū Crane-Ken user Rūtsu and Rin Jū Crow-Ken user Rasuka, defeat the Gekirangers as well as overpowering Geki ElephanTohja. When the team asks Xia Fu on a technique to fly to counter the two flying martial artists, he sends them to a mysterious appreciation festival where they meet Kensei Bat Li, a grand master of the Geki Jū Bat-Ken style. Though he refused at first, Bat Li changes his mind when Retu shows him his abilities. While Jyan and Ran attempt to stop the Flying-Ken, Retu begins learning Geki Jū Bat-Ken and the art of the war fan from Bat Li, whose lesson is simple: "Abandon all techniques to master this fighting style."
14	"Netsu-Netsu! Forget the Technique"; Transliteration: "Netsu-Netsu! Waza wo Sutero" (Japanese: ネツネツ！技を捨てろ)	Masato Tsujino	Genki Yoshimura	Ran	May 20, 2007
Ran and Jyan arrive to fight the Flying-Ken, who overpower them until Rasuka is offended by them and has Rūtsu fly off while he beats the two Gekirangers by himself, wounding Ran's leg. While Ran is being tended to, Miki brings out the new weapon for Retu and tells Jyan and Ran to give it to him once he has completed his training. This training, in his eyes, is attempting to dance just like Bat Li. He initially has trouble, but he eventually realizes that Bat Li's dancing has no technique. Once Jyan and Ran find Retu and Bat Li, Retu has mastered the Bat-Ken style while in a trance, and he is given the Geki Fan. With the Geki Fan, Geki Blue defeats the Flying-Ken singlehandedly. The Flying-Ken enlarge themselves and are able to unleash their attack, but on Bat Li's words, the Gekirangers enter a trance to bring out legendary Geki Beast Geki Bat, with whom GekiTohja combines to form Geki BatTohja to battle the Flying-Ken in an aerial dogfight. The fight ends with Rūtsu slamming into the side of a mountain and Rasuka destroyed. Meanwhile, after surviving Kata's training to channel his hatred, a bloodthirsty, berserk Rio attacks the Rinshis with rage to amplify his malice even more until Rio's hatred became new Rinki, to Mere's horror. That same hatred awakened Rūtsu as he emerges from the rubble of the battlefield with intend on getting revenge on the Gekirangers for the death of his partner.
15	"Howa-Howa! Mama Skills"; Transliteration: "Howa-Howa! Mama Gyō" (Japanese: ホワホワ！ママ業)	Satoshi Morota	Michiko Yokote	Mele	May 27, 2007
After watching a sparring fight between Rio and Kata. Mere offered to look and revive the other Kenma in Rio's place, as their training can help. Rio allows it as an irate Kata decides to further Rio's lesson with the aid of the "now-insane" Rūtsu. At SCRTC, Ran got angry at Jyan and Retu's lack of order until Rūtsu shows up in the city, again. While he fights the guys, taking two energy orbs out of them, throwing them to the ground. Geki Yellow attacks Rūtsu, knocking the orbs away. When Ran finds Retu after the fight, she's shocked to see him as an infant and Jyan is a young child. Xia Fu reveals the orbs to be the Pulse, a qi tied to a person's age and without it, the two have no memory of their older selves. But the two can find their Pulse, so Ran has to care for them as their mother until then. During this, Ran loses Jyan while changing Retu. She finds Jyan scaling a building, learning he was aiding a baby bird back to its nest with Jyan calling Ran "Howa-Howa". Rūtsu then appears, with intend to kill them in the most hateful way possible. The Gekiranger "family" runs away, eventually finding the Pulse orbs. Ran tries to fight Rūtsu, but she is unable to defeat him, until Jyan henshins into Geki Red and sends Rūtsu flying to protect his "mama". Ran used the power of motherly love to overpower Rūtsu's hate, then turning Jyan and Retu back into adults. A furious Rūtsu enlarged, only to be destroyed by Geki BatTohja. Soon after, Ran learns that Retu and Jyan have no memory while without their kodou, with Ran a bit sadden by it. While this was all happening, Mere is having trouble finding the Kenma' gravesites until it is revealed that her actual goal was not to just revive the remaining Kenma, but to replace Kata with a teacher for Rio who was more to her liking. Upon this revelation, a Kenma speaks to her, complimenting her about this, as well as informing Mere of her final resting place. Making her way to the beach on instructions, Mere managed to tear down the barrier and used the True Poison Fang, being blasted back on land by the shockwave of the resurrection of the revived Sea Kenma: Rin Jū Jelly-Ken grand mistress Rageku.
16	"Jiri-Jiri! Rin Jū Hall, Extracurricular Class"; Transliteration: "Jiri-Jiri! Rin Jūden, Kagai Jugyō" (Japanese: ジリジリ！臨獣殿、課外授業)	Satoshi Morota	Michiko Yokote	Jyan or whole Gekiranger team	June 3, 2007
The revived Rageku arrives at the Rin Jū Hall to meet Rio. However, much to Kata's distaste, Rageku favors Mere more than Rio. When Mere refuses to prove herself by fighting Rio, Rageku poisons Rio as her way to start Rio on the path of suffering and to start Mere's training with a foe of her choosing. Rageku then attacks the city and easily defeats GekiTohja, with Xia Fu's appearance leading to a revelation on the origins of the Seven Kensei and the Three Kenma as the first Jūken Masters, until they assumed their current forms and founded the two opposing schools before the Geki -Rin Rebellion that led to the Demons' defeat. Rageku then forces Mere to fight Xia Fu, immobilizing the Gekirangers to ensure no interference. In order to win, Mere uses Infinite Waves on herself to fight at full strength despite her own internal pain. Rio watches while the poison courses through him, until he overpowers Rageku's Ringi and save Mere from sacrificing herself to kill Xia Fu. After a brief fight, Rio defeats Rageku, though she reveals that she was only testing him for his jealousy of Mere being able to overwhelm Xia Fu. Rageku then took Rio and Mere as her disciples while as the Gekirangers start training harder.
17	"Goro-Goro! Teacher and Student Love"; Transliteration: "Goro-Goro! Shitei Ai" (Japanese: ゴロゴロ！師弟愛)	Katsuya Watanabe	Shō Aikawa	Jyan or whole Gekiranger team	June 10, 2007
In order to combat Rageku, Xia Fu sends the team to the isolated Aozame Island to meet the Kensei Sharkie Chan, Grand Master of the Geki Jū Shark-Ken style. In a series of tests which comprised paddling a canoe through several traps, Sharkie becomes impressed by Jyan's strength and chooses him as his pupil for learning how to master his style and the Geki Sabers. In this training, Jyan becomes attached to his teacher, and they form a bond. Meanwhile, Rin Jū Hermit Crab-Ken user Dokariya closed in on the group's location, and uses his Ringi Base-Form Robbing Strike to take over Sharkie Chan to have him suffer as Rageku intended: By having him attack the Gekirangers. But Jyan's bond with Sharkie allows the Kensei to overpower Dokariya's Ringi, with an enraged Jyan using the Geki Sabers on the Beast-Man before the gang fires Geki Bazooka on him. When he becomes a giant, the Gekirangers call upon GekiTohja and use Jyan's training to summon the Legendary Geki Beast, Geki Shark. They send Geki Shark at Dokariya, who is seemingly destroyed, only to be attacked by Geki Shark upon its return to everyone's shock.
18	"Sharkin-Kīn! The Body is Strong"; Transliteration: "Shakkin-Kīn! Karada, Tsuyoi" (Japanese: シャッキンキーン！身体、強い)	Katsuya Watanabe	Shō Aikawa	Rio	June 24, 2007
It is revealed that Geki Shark is possessed by Dokariya, and it takes an attack from Bat Li and Elehung to tell the Gekirangers to use Geki ElephanTohja to defeat Geki Shark for the time being. The two Kensei berate Sharkie, because they feel that he was not up to the task of teaching a student due to his ideals of a strong body being foolish, before Xia Fu arrived and suggested that they all go back to the group's campsite to try to continue the training. Sharkie tries to impress Elehung and Bat Li, but they further scold Sharkie's ideals, and he leaves, disheartened as he renounces Jyan as his student out of failing him. That night, someone uses one of Sharkie's swords to attack Xia Fu, and Miki assumes that it must be Sharkie, with Bat Li, Elehung, and the Gekirangers pursuing him. The next morning, the two Kensei, Retu, and Ran find/capture Sharkie, while Miki and Xia Fu clean up the campsite. While Xia Fu is distracted, Miki picks up one of tent's pins and charges at him, only to be stopped by Jyan who knew something was wrong all along. Dokariya reveals himself after being defeated in Miki's body by Xia Fu and then jumps into Jyan to use him to kill Xia Fu as Rageku wished. However, Jyan overpowers the Hermit Crab-Ken user and forces him out of his body, revealing that Sharkie's training allowed him to overcome the Ringi. Jyan then uses the techniques Sharkie taught him to defeat Dokariya with the Geki Waza Wave-Wave Slash. Dokariya then enlarges and jumps into the sea. But GekiTohja follows by summoning Geki Shark and combine to form Geki SharkTohja. The battle underwater ends with Geki SharkTohja's Great Firm-Firm Slash destroying Dokariya. After the battle, Xia Fu approves of Sharkie as a true master, bringing the Kensei to tears. Back at the Rin Jū Hall, Rio reveals his one true rival to Rageku: a man with a "White Tiger" Geki named Byakko.
19	"Gokin-Gokin! Showdown with Rio"; Transliteration: "Gokin-Gokin! Rio to Taiketsu" (Japanese: ゴキンゴキン！理央と対決)	Noboru Takemoto	Michiko Yokote	Jyan or whole Gekiranger team	July 8, 2007
While Confrontation Toad-Ken user Eruka fights the Gekirangers, Rio undergoes a rite of passage to become even more powerful. Eruka is defeated by the Jūken Armament Triangle Attack of GekiTohja armaments as Kata and Rageku give life to two statues in the Rin Jū Hall, the Confrontation Machine Soldiers Butoka and Wagataku, to assist Rio. When he arrives in the outskirts of the city, he challenges the Gekirangers to battle, assuming Black Lion form and using the Confrontation Machine Soldiers to keep Jyan and Retu at bay while he faces off with Ran. She does her best to try to defeat Rio, but not even her Geki Hammer Bullet-Bullet Ball nor her Mom-Mom Strike can defeat Rio. Retu then fights Rio with his Double Geki Fans, but his Air-Air Slash does nothing against Rio. With Retu defeated, Jyan enters the fray, unable to defeat Rio with either his Geki Saber Thin-Thin Slash or Wave-Wave Slash attacks. He then calls upon Ran and Retu to try to defeat Rio with the Geki Bazooka's Fierce-Fierce Cannon, but even it cannot harm Rio, as he sends an even stronger blast of Rinki at them, leaving Ran and Retu back in their civilian clothing. Jyan is left standing as he staggers towards Rio who uses the Brave-Roar Wave Ringi on Jyan that burns the remnants of his Gekiranger suit off. Rio attempts to finish Jyan off, but Jyan begins to burn with an intense white Geki as he attempts to give Rio a finishing punch. Before he can go through with it, he burns himself out and passes out, saying that Rio is "Gokin-Gokin." Rio recognizes this Geki as the same Geki as that of the White Tiger as Xia Fu shows up and explains that it is the Kageki. Xia Fu adds that it would be more of a victory for Rio to defeat the Gekirangers when they all obtain the Kageki. He agrees to go with Rio as his prisoner, and Rio gives the Gekiranger three days to obtain Kageki or Xia Fu will be executed. The Gekirangers have lost all hope, but Miki shows up later in the night to bring the team back into their senses. She tells them that they will have to be trained by the final three Kensei, who just have arrived to Japan, to achieve the Kageki.
20	"Gicho-Gicho! Triangle Opposition Match"; Transliteration: "Gicho-Gicho! Toraianguru Taikō Sen" (Japanese: ギチョギチョ！トライアングル対抗戦)	Noboru Takemoto	Michiko Yokote	Jyan or whole Gekiranger team	July 15, 2007
To obtain the Kageki, the Gekirangers seek out the Kensei that will help them, but they are attacked by the very Kensei that they are looking for. The Gekirangers are defeated, and the Kensei introduce themselves: Gorie Yen of the Geki Jū Gorilla-Ken, Michelle Peng of the Geki Jū Penguin-Ken, and Bion Biao of the Geki Jū Gazelle-Ken styles. Miki then explains that they must compete with the Kensei of the Master Triangle in the Three Peaks Battle, three competitions based on each Gekiranger's own flaws. First, Jyan and Gorie Yen compete in a challenge of the "Heart" where the first to stack 500 yen coins on their edges wins. Jyan has difficulty, while Gorie asks him why he fights to which Jyan does not have a suitable answer. Gorie completes his stack, while an upset Jyan was too frustrated to get one to stand. Soon after, he and Retu fight due to the loss until Ran gets them to stop. Next, she competes with Michelle Peng in a challenge of "Technique" where they skateboard in two turns on a half pipe erected on the roof of SCRTC headquarters with an electronic scoreboard. Michelle performs multiple spins on her first turn, not seeing a need for a second. When Ran attempts the same challenge, she falls on her first try, but Retu's advice to mentally draw a picture in her mind allows her to ties with Michelle on the second try. The last competition is one of "Body" between Bion Biao and Retu, where they must grapple to take a bandana off of the other's arm. Retu attempts to use his Technique, but Biao counters easily. Jyan yells at Retu to forget about the techniques and beauty and just fight. The competition lasted until dawn with Retu managing to take Biao's bandana at sunrise. The Gekirangers win the competition, realizing that by supporting each other, they can do anything. While the competition had occurs, Xia Fu reveals to Rio that the factor of friendship will allow his pupils to obtain Kageki unlike Rio himself, who loses his temper upon hearing this fact and burns the cage with his Rinki, telling Xia Fu that he will face them now. Jyan senses Rio on the move as the Master Triangle provide the Gekirangers with the Super Geki Claws, which will allow them to access the Kageki, before they head off to face Rio.
21	"Biki-Biki-Biki-Biki! Extremely Kageki"; Transliteration: "Biki-Biki-Biki-Biki! Kageki ni Kageki" (Japanese: ビキビキビキビキ！カゲキに過激気)	Satoshi Morota	Michiko Yokote	Jyan or whole Gekiranger team	July 22, 2007
Though the Gekirangers completed their training, they have yet to obtain Kageki and Jyan is still disheartened by Gorie Yen's statement and starts rethinking what he is fighting for. But in spite of these facts, the trio made their way to Rio, whom Xia Fu asked why he wants to be stronger. While the fight occurs, Kata and Rageku are collecting Rinki from the people of the city with intend on destroying it once their student wins. Ran attempts to use her fast fists but Rio used the Jelly-Ken style to evade her attempt before swiftly defeating her. Retu tries his hand, but Rio uses the Flying-Ken style which Retu is unable to counter. Jyan attempts to fight Rio, again, but even with the Geki Sabers, he is not a match for Rio. With Jyan's Gekiranger suit burned off, Rio states to Xia Fu that it is his choice to be stronger that is his reason to fight. However Xia Fu reveals that deep down, Rio is still afraid of his past. Refusing to accept that truth, Rio attacks Ran and Retu, leaving them bloodied to Jyan's horror. It was then Jyan realizes that his true reason to fight is to protect everyone. This allows Jyan to finally use his Super Geki Claw and transform into Super Geki Red, negating the Kenma' attack on the city and knocking Rio into a cliff face. Mere sends the Confrontation Machine Soldiers to aid Rio, with Ran and Retu following Jyan's example and become Super Geki Yellow and Super Geki Blue. With their new power, Restu and Ran are able to destroy Butoka and Wagataku while Jyan deals a finishing blow to Rio, defeating him. As the gang pursue to free Xia Fu, Mere attempts to hold a furious Rio back. At Mere's behest, Kata and Rageku use the Rinki they gathered to reconstruct Butoka and Wagataku into giants. The Super Gekirangers call upon their new Super Geki Beasts along with the other Geki Beasts and they destroy Wagataku. Butoka is all that remains, and it absorbs its partner's Rinki before dissipating all of the older Geki Beasts. The Super Geki beasts then form GekiFire to destroy Butoka. As the Gekirangers celebrate their victory, an enraged Rio realizes Jyan is the White Tiger's successor and is more intent on destroying them.
22	"Kyui-Kyui! Date with a Celebrity"; Transliteration: "Kyui-Kyui! Serebu to Dēto" (Japanese: キュイキュイ！セレブとデート)	Satoshi Morota	Shō Aikawa	Ran	July 29, 2007
Still maddened by his defeat, Rio's rage attracts the attention of the third and final Kenma. Upon reaching the final resting place, Rio attempts to resurrect him against Kata and Rageku's wishes out of fear of what would occur, only to learn that the final True Poison fang has no effect. He then learns that the final Kenma's heart, the Ikigimo, was removed from his body after his defeat. Refusing to accept defeat, Rio sends out Mere to find the Ikigimo, with her enlisting Rin Jū Pig-Ken user Tabū. Meanwhile at SCRTC, Xia Fu calls in Sharkie, whom the Ikigimo was entrusted to. However, Sharkie reveals that he had lost it when a tsunami hit Aozame Island. But, the item was found by the Nanboku family and in the possession of a celebrity girl named Alice Nanboku. Jyan found her and the gang tries to get the Ikigimo from her, but both Retu and Ran's offerings failed to get Alice's favor as she takes Jyan out on the town until he shows Alice the "Kyui-Kyui", or natural beauty of things. When he asks about her "Kyui-Kyui", Alice explains she has none. Jyan finds a large amethyst stone and gives it her, only for her to throw it away when he asked for the Ikigumo. She is then captured by Tabū and Mere takes the Ikigimo from her. Jyan, unable to become Super Geki Red, tries to fight Mere in vain. Jyan is forced to save Alice from becoming Tabū's lunch rather go after Mere. By the time he arrives, he still cannot become Super Geki Red and is overpowered by Tabū. But when he sees that she is about to fall, he is finally able to transform into Super Geki Red and saves her from certain doom. Ran and Retu arrive with Gorie Yen and Sharkie, and the Super Gekirangers use the Geki Bazooka to destroy Tabū, but he survives and grows. The Super Gekirangers call upon GekiFire, but it first is not enough so the team calls upon Geki Shark and forms Geki SharkFire, whose blades finally destroy Tabū. Her experience with Jyan that allowed Alice to find her own "Kyuikyui". Back at the Rin Jū Hall, Rio succeeds in bringing back to life the Land Kenma Maku, the Confrontation Bear-Ken grand master. However, as the others feared, Maku is enraged of the changes that occurs in his absence. The shockwaves of Maku's rage alerts the others at SCRTC with Xia Fu seeing the only course of action is the enlisting of a new Gekiranger to counter Maku's rebirth. Meanwhile, the very same shockwave also awakens a mysterious young man with a silver cross around his neck from a cave.
23	"Gure-Gure! Sukeban Captain"; Transliteration: "Gure-Gure! Sukeban Kyaputen" (Japanese: グレグレ！スケ番キャプテン)	Katsuya Watanabe	Naruhisa Arakawa	Retsu	August 5, 2007
Xia Fu believes that with another Gekiranger coming, a team captain is necessary and he selects Ran to be that suitable leader. She tries to teach some sense into Jyan and Retu by reviewing their past battles until Rin Jū Porcupine-Ken user Mārashiya begins his attack on the city. Ran tries to order Jyan and Retu in the battle, but they are attacked and Ran is hit by Mārashiya's Ringi Needle-Sword Mountain, turned into a sukeban with no cure in sight. She wreaks havoc in the SCRTC office, with everyone attempting to restraint her in vain as she jumps out of the building, taking off on a motorcycle while Natsume watches. But while the rest of the group tries to figure out what to do, Jyan and Restsu run off to intercept Mārashiya, briefly encountering a werewolf who went after Restu before eluding. No sooner did the werewolf leave then Mārashiya arrive and the two Gekirangers fight him. Meanwhile, being a sukeban in her youth, Miki tracks Ran in an underground club, easily taking her down and dragging her back to SCRTC to force her to remember her heart and regain her oldself, allowing Ran to help Jyan and Retu, as well as have her use her Kageki to burn the Ringi off her. The Gekiranger managed to destroy Mārashiya by using Ran's experience as a Sukeban in the new Geki ElephantFire formation. While this all occurs, Maku overthrows Rio while showing off his Dorinki, which Rio is determined to learn at the cost of his dignity. A sadden Mere would leave the chamber and be confronted the mysterious Long, who offers her good news. Back in Tokyo, after making their peace, the Gekirangers see the werewolf, who reverts to human form. Then the figure turned around, Retu realizes that it is his supposedly dead older brother: Gou Fukami.
24	"Garu-Garu! What's This, Little Brother!?"; Transliteration: "Garu-Garu! Nante Kotta, Otōto ga!?" (Japanese: ガルガル！なんてこった、弟が！？)	Katsuya Watanabe	Michiko Yokote	Gou	August 12, 2007
Learning the werewolf to be his older brother Gou, Retu confronts him, using his silver cross to identify himself. At the Rin Jū Hall, refusing to rely on Rio and Mere in his campaign, Maku calls upon his bodyguard, Hihi of the Rin Jū Baboon-Ken, to herald the new Fierce-Confrontation Rebellion. Mere, remembering Long's words, decides to follow Hihi to understand the cryptic news he told her. Back at SCRTC, Xia Fu reveals that Gou used a forbidden Geki Waza in an attempt to seal Rio. When he learns that Rio evaded the attempt and now leads the Akugata, Gou is angered at hearing the news. But Gou is more vexed that Retesu is a Jūken artist, leaving SCRTC in a huff and confronting HiHi with his Shigeki until the presence of a golden aura causes him to transform into a werewolf as the Gekirangers arrive. Retu stays with Gou to try to calm him down while Jyan and Ran go to fight Hihi. Once Gou becomes human again, he refuses to let Retu go after Hihi and brings him to the church where they grew up to remember the events of their last meeting: with Gou having Retu vow to never practice the Jūken and focus on his art. Gou then attempts to reason and then punch Retu, but both failed as Retu tells him that he has chosen his path long ago, before being informed by Miki that Ran and Jyan are in trouble. Gou chases after Restu, witnessing his fight against Hihi as Super Geki Blue, who realizes the error of his ways in preventing Retu from his true calling in seeing his fighting style. Though defeated, Hihi enlarged himself and was soon knocked off into the nearby mountain by Geki BatFire. Gou later apologizes to Retu, and they leave the battlefield. However, thanks to an upset Mere, Hihi regains consciousness and assumes a Dorinki-empowered form, attacking the Gekirangers in full-fury.
25	"Hine-Hine! Just My Shigeki"; Transliteration: "Hine-Hine! Ore Dake no Shigeki" (Japanese: ヒネヒネ！俺だけの紫激気)	Noboru Takemoto	Shō Aikawa	Jyan or whole Gekiranger team	August 19, 2007
After being injured by the "Dorinki"-powered Hihi, the Gekirangers learn from Xia Fu of the Dorinki and were advised not to access the Kageki in their injured state. Retu believes that his brother Gou will assist them as the new Gekiranger, but he refuses, revealing he does not fight for justice and showing his Shigeki as proof before leaving the SCRTC office. At the Rin Jū Hall, Rio is marveled by Hihi's new form as Mere reveals that Maku infused the Rinrinshi with his power, attempting to ask the Kenma to give some to Rio too. This resulted with Maku physically rebuffing her, as well as Rio's disappointment at Mere for suggesting that he takes the easy road. Mere leaves in tears, confronted by Long who tells her that Rio's greatest rival, Gou, would be an issue should he become a Gekiranger unless she kills him first. Gou visits a beach before being hit by the mysterious gold cloud and turns into the werewolf. But Natsume was there and managed to calm Gou down back to human form. Gou evaded Natsume only to run into Mere, telling her he has no intent to be a Gekiranger while defending himself until he has to save Natsume from an attack. Miki soon arrives and after Gou realizes that he has a sense of justice, he gains the GongChanger, an item commissioned by Xia Fu long ago. Using it, Gou becomes Geki Violet to defeat Mere. While this occurs, the Gekiranger battle Hihi in their regular forms. However, once enlarged, Hihi overpowers GekiTohja and focuses his attacks on the right leg until Geki Violet arrives in Geki Wolf. When Geki Cheetah disappears due to Ran's own injuries, Geki Wolf becomes a replacement limb, forming GekiTohja Wolf and defeating Hihi with the Geki Waza Great Wolf-Wolf Leg. With the fight over, Xia Fu is glad that Gou found his path and is truly home. With Rio feeling Gou still alive and with greater strength like the others, this incites him to access the Dorinki within himself, just as Long had planned.
26	"Mohe-Mohe! Consulting your Worries"; Transliteration: "Mohe-Mohe! Onayami Sōdan" (Japanese: モヘモヘ！お悩み相談)	Noboru Takemoto	Shō Aikawa	Jyan or whole Gekiranger team	August 26, 2007
During a spar training, Gou negates the Geki Waza Fierce-Fierce Cannon with his equally strong Geki Waza Rigid-Rigid Fist. However, Gou ignores Jyan's praises, making him feel "Mohe-Mohe" and runs off for reasons the others cannot figure out. Meanwhile, Maku unearths an army of Confrontation Machine Soldiers hidden within the mountainside, empowering a Butoka/Wagataku pair with his Dorinki to have them destroy the city as his vanguards. Rio, seeing that his Dorinki is a spark compared to Maku's, soon leaves while telling Mere not to follow him. Back at SCRTC, Michelle Peng shows up to ask about the new team, revealing that she took Jyan to see Gorie Yen. At Gou's behest, she takes the gang to Gorie's Jūken Consultation Office shack in the dark woods. Gorie reveals he finished consulting Jyan, sending him off, and then speaks to Gou about how he feels about fitting in with the team. While looking for Jyan, Ran and Retu encounter Butoka and Wagataku, with Gou arriving at the battle just as the two have been nearly defeated, with Gou intend to fight on his own to protect their Triangle. But Jyan shows up and reveals that he wants them all to work as a group of four instead of solely the Triangle. As the four Gekirangers, they are able to destroy Butoka and Wagataku with their team Geki Waza Geki Union. However, Maku's rage recreates Dorinki Soldiers into giants and the gang calls upon GekiFire and Geki Wolf, but are unable to do much until Gou manages to summon GekiTohja Wolf, and they win. Elsewhere, Rio pays Gorie a visit, inquiring if he is powerful enough to defeat Maku and what Gorie knows of the Dark Forest Path. Rio manages to defeat Gorie, who reveals that Maku is too powerful for Rio to fight. As a result, Rio learns of the Jūken Sacred Grounds of Beast-Origin Village, where he would find the means to destroy Maku and the Geki Jūken.
27	"Beran-Beran! Burn, Commentator"; Transliteration: "Beran-Beran! Moeyo Jikkyō" (Japanese: ベランベラン！燃えよ実況)	Shojiro Nakazawa	Kazuki Nakashima	Jyan or whole Gekiranger team	September 2, 2007
During a fight with Pouōte of the Rin Jū Archerfish-Ken style, Long intervenes and creates a mist from his qi to transform Gou into his werewolf form while in GekiTohja Wolf, turning him on the others inside GekiFire. The two giants defeat each other, with the resulting blast sending both Gou and Bae flying to the same location. Though he needed to return to Mere, Bae felt he had to follow Gou. When he returns to SCRTC headquarters, the other Gekirangers are being treated for their wounds, and Bion Biao brings in Bae, who is labeled a traitor. Bae formally introduces himself to the gang and reveals that he, like Gou used the imperfect version of forbidden Geki Waza Beast-Beast Full-Body Change in a battle with Mere during the Fierce-Confrontation Rebellion, but he was defeated and eaten by Mere. It is then that Gou is overcome by his beast side and attacks the others, just as Pouōte restarts his rampage. Jyan stays to try to keep Gou at bay while Ran and Retu go to fight Pouōte. Jyan is able to keep his ground with Xia Fu revealing that an evil Ki is within Gou's body that evokes the change. Not wanting to stand on the sideline, Bae begins to speak to Gou's human heart, freezing the werewolf Gou in his tracks. But he starts to feel his life starting to fade, as he was brought back by the residual Rinki that Rio used to revived Mere ten years prior. Bent on saving him despite dying, Bae uses his Geki Waza Speak-Speak Soul to have Gou undergo a metaphysical battle with his beast side, ending up victorious. He and Jyan join Ran and Retu in defeating Pouōte, with GekiTohja Wolf dealing the final blow. However, Bae dies and everyone is saddened until Mere arrives, her Rinki revitalizing him as they leave. Meanwhile, a mysterious young man in a white and orange tracksuit returns from traveling abroad.
28	"With Bishi-Bishi Pikīn Osu!"; Transliteration: "Bishi-Bishi Pikīn de Osu!" (Japanese: ビシビシピキーンで押忍！)	Shojiro Nakazawa	Michiko Yokote	Ken	September 9, 2007
At SCRTC, Master Xia Fu tells the team that they are going to be getting a fifth team member. At the same time, Jyan is out in town buying some menchi katsu, but a young man in a white jumpsuit buys the last one before Jyan can. They fight over the food until Jyan senses Niwa of the Rin Jū Crocodile-Ken as he is fighting Ran, Retu, and Gou. Jyan tries to join them in the fight, but because he had the menchi katsu, the other man interrupts the battle by driving a truck towards Jyan and allow Niwa to leave. When Xia Fu shows up, he greets the man, Ken Hisatsu, the fifth Gekiranger. They all visit the SCRTC Meisters workshop, home to Ken's family, but his father is angry at him for leaving the country during training. Ken realizes that he has alienated himself from the other Gekirangers, with Xia Fu giving him a chance to redeem himself by successfully befriending one of his teammates. Ken decides to befriend Jan by giving him menchi katsu, but it does not work, as despite this Jan will not accept him, upset by this, Ken tries to take the menchi katsu back from him When he senses Niwa on the attack again, Jyan attempts to go but is hindered when Ken's sister Sachiko tries to defend her brother. But when Ken admits defeat, she gives up and was going to run off when a sign nearly crushes her. Ken uses his Geki Hard Diamond technique to save her from the sign, and Xia Fu arrives with the repaired Geki Changers designed for Ken. At the battle with Niwa, Jyan distracts him long enough for Ken to summon the SaiBlade and transform into Geki Chopper and destroys Niwa with his Geki Waza Sharp-Sharp Blade. Back at SCRTC, the gang celebrate until Xia Fu asks Ken about the SoZyuTo which he gave him, to which Ken avoids the subject. Elsewhere, Rio is making his way to the Beast Origin Village, until Long arrives in various guises to inform him of the Sevenfold Barrier of Seven Sages that only the SoZyuTo can break.
29	"Guda-Guda Here-Here! Shopping"; Transliteration: "Guda-Guda Here-Here! Shoppingu" (Japanese: グダグダヘレヘレ！ショッピング)	Satoshi Morota	Naruhisa Arakawa	Ken	September 16, 2007
Though Ken now on the team, it turned out that he lost SoZyuTo and left to find it. Ken took Retu with him, revealing that he actually sold it as they arrive to Chinatown. Once they arrive to the store he sold the SoZyuTo to, they are confronted by its shopkeeper, Hanyon: an elderly woman with a hatred for Geki Jūken users. When Ken asked for it back, Hanyun refused to sell it back with her many traps keeping the two at bay. Elsewhere, Kata sends his student, Chouda of the Rin Jū Ostrich-Ken to collect more suffering for Maku as Rio returns, giving Mere instructions to find the SoZyuTo. As Chouda begins his attack on the city, Jyan, Ran, and Gou intervene, only to fall for Chouda's deception. When they dispatch with her latest trap, Ken and Retu find an old photograph of a young woman with Bat Li when the Kensei himself appears and attacks the two. However, Ken realizes it is not Bat Li and uses his Geki Hard Diamond grind to reveal that it was actually Hanyun. She tells her story of how she fell in love with Bat Li when he saved her, but he did not fulfill his vow to remain by her side as he promised. The battle with Chouda continues, as he is defeated by the three others in an attempt to destroy him and then grows to his giant size. Gou fights in GekiTohja Wolf, as Ran and Jyan cannot do anything until Retu arrives to the battlefield in Geki Gazelle. Chouda is defeated by both, but not before he created an egg that burrowed underground as he died. Meanwhile, Ken then brings Hanyun to see Bat Li, who thanks her for the charm she made for him long ago and Hanyun is brought to tears as she gives Ken the SoZyuTo to thank him. Ken returns to the group with the SoZyuTo in hand, but Xia Fu scolds him for having sold it in the first place but forgives him for helping Hanyun. Meanwhile, Rio gets into a confrontation with Maku over his whereabouts and a question of loyalty leads to a fight between them.
30	"The Sei-Sei and Dou-Dou Woman"; Transliteration: "Sei-Sei de Dō-Dō no Onna" (Japanese: セイセイでドウドウの女)	Satoshi Morota	Naruhisa Arakawa	Ken	September 23, 2007
When Mere returns to the Rin Jū Hall after finding the SoZyuTo's whereabouts, she finds Rio fighting Maku and forced to reveal how strong he became. However, even with Dorinki, Rio is still unable to best Maku in combat. At the last second, Mere intervenes by shielding Rio, promising him that she will retrieve the SoZyuTo if he stands down for now. Rio reluctantly accept defeat and soon was in a cell while Maku ponders a suitable punishment. At SCRTC, though offered the SoZyuTo, Xia Fu allows Ken to keep it. However, the rest of the team scolded Ken for having sold it in the first place and his laidback nature. He escapes to meet Sachiko and give her a birthday present, noticing Mere watching him. Once Sachiko leaves, Mere demands the SoZyuTo from Ken, preferring to win it in a fight. But the other Gekirangers intervene and Mere leaves just as Jyan senses a "Zowa-Zowa". This leads the team to the new Chouda born from his parents' final Ringi and thus immune to the all attacks but Geki Chopper's. Just as he was about to finish the Beast-Man, Ken sees Sachiko, only to realize it is someone else who tells him that Mere kidnapped the real Sachiko and that she will be returned in exchange for the SoZyuTo. Knocking out Gou, Ken arrives to where Mere is holding his sister hostage, offering that they finish their fight to settle this. Mere accepts and over-powers Ken, who wins barely and Mere accepts defeat. However, Long's prodding forces Mere to send Sachiko to a watery grave and steal the SoZyuTo from Ken. Upon realizing what she has just done, she begins to burn Dorinki, much to Long's approval. After finding Sachiko saved by Gou, Ken and Gou arrive back at the battle with Chouda. The five Gekirangers overwhelm Chouda with their multiple attacks, ending with Geki Chopper's Many-Many Slash. When Chouda uses Wicked Body Overpowering Heavenly Change, the Super Gekirangers defeat him in GekiFire. Though Ken was ashamed of losing the SoZyuTo, Xia Fu ensures him that he and the other Kensei will handle it as Mere returns to the Rin Jū Hall, freeing Rio as they both go to the Beast Origin Village.
31	"We Muni-Muni!"; Transliteration: "Oretachi Muni-Muni!" (Japanese: 俺たちムニムニ！)	Katsuya Watanabe	Yūji Kobayashi	Jyan or whole Gekiranger team	September 30, 2007
At Natsume's school, the star player of the basketball team, Shinichi, was winning the game until his selfishness resulted with the team losing. On his way home, he sees Tsuneki of the Rin Jū Fox-Ken style and holds his own for a short time until the Gekirangers arrive to help him. However, he still does not wish to have any help and is captured by Tsuneki as a shield. Geki Chopper is about to save him, but Geki Red stops him to ensure Shinichi's safety. The boy does manage to escape, but so does Tsuneki, who fires an arrow into the air to begin his plan. Jyan tries to befriend Shinichi with Ken, trying to show him the meaning of "Muni-Muni" (teamwork), but it ends badly as they are trapped in Tsuneki's Secret Ringi Fox Dimension Great Bomb, which would explode from amassing the energy of those who suffer within it. Ken attempts to hold the stronger Tsuneki him off as Jyan and Shinichi run away. Shinichi learns the meaning of Muni-Muni, as Ken saves him and Jyan from certain doom. The two transform into Super Geki Red and Geki Chopper and use Shinichi's planning to deliver the final blow with the Geki Waza Sharp-Sharp Kageki Slash, negating the Ringi as a result in time. Tsuneki then grows to giant size and fights Geki ElephantFire and GekiTohja Wolf, with Shinichi and Geki Chopper cheering on. With a basketball like shoot with the EleHammer, Tsuneki is destroyed. At a later basketball game, Shinichi's team wins because he passes the ball to Seiji. Meanwhile, with Rio and Mere gone, Maku takes out his frustration on Kata and Rageku before deciding to go after the two. However, Long confronts Maku over the Rin Jūken's leadership, which results in a fight. But Long takes his leave after dodging all of Maku's attacks easily, revealing that the fight was a distraction as Rio and Mere have already arrived at the site of the Beast Origin Village. But before they can tear down the Sevenfold Barrier of Seven Sages with the SoZyuTo, they are confronted by Xia Fu.
32	"Zowangi-Zowango! The Gathering, Beast Origin Village"; Transliteration: "Zowangi-Zowango! Shūketsu, Jūgenkyō" (Japanese: ゾワンギゾワンゴ！集結、獣源郷)	Katsuya Watanabe	Michiko Yokote	Jyan or whole Gekiranger team	October 7, 2007
Rio and Mere managed to arrive at the Beast Origin Village thanks to the SoZyuTo. However, they are hindered by all seven Kensei, who have no choice but to make a stand to keep Rio away from the Jūken God that dwells within. Though the two had Dorinki, the Kensei overpowered Rio and Mere. However, the Kenma arrive on Maku's cloud, with Maku bent on punishing Rio for his disrespect towards him. But Xia Fu chided Maku as he himself was the same with their mentor, Brusa Ee, revealing how Maku and the other First Demons murdered their master with the Seven Kensei stopping them from achieving world dominion. Though Maku was bent on finishing their fight, Kata got curious of the importance behind their old training grounds and used his Ringi to probe Sharkie's mind to learn that after the fight, the Seven Kensei created SaiDain, to hold their master's soul. When Xia Fu questions Maku's reason for betraying Brusa, he infuriates the Kenma to enlarge and attempt to kill the Kensei, only to hindered by GekiFire. But even through Geki Bat and Geki Shark, GekiFire was easily defeated by the stronger Maku, who intends to teach the Gekirangers a lesson in respect. The Kensei restrain Maku and the Kenma, allowing the Gekirangers to pursue Rio and Mere, facing them within SaiDain's chamber. But Rageku arrives during their fight and uses her Ringi on the seven to send them all back in time as Maku ordered.
33	"Fure-Fure Gatchiri! Kung Fu Chūshingura"; Transliteration: "Fure-Fure Gatchiri! Kanfū Chūshingura" (Japanese: フレフレガッチリ！カンフー忠臣蔵)	Shojiro Nakazawa	Naruhisa Arakawa	Ken	October 14, 2007
Rageku's Secret Ringi sends the Gekirangers to January 30, 1703 at the time of the Edo Era, with Rio and Mere nowhere to be found. But a scream attracted their attention and found Rin Jū Anglerfish-Ken user Mukoua as he emerged from the body of Kira Yoshinaka and wounded Mōri Koheita to take the item he had, revealing that he is here on orders to keep the gang trapped in time. The Gekirangers take the boy's scroll to Lady Yōzeiin, the wife of the late Asano Naganori (who bears a striking resemblance to Miki), who reveals that Ōishi Yoshio and his 47 Ronin followers are to finally avenge their master this night. Hearing the rumors of Kira's possession true, Yōzeiin pleas the Gekirangers to remove the "evil spirit" before the Akō Rōshi Raid begins. While getting ready, the guys find Mere who is tending to Rio and his memory loss, revealing SoZyuTo gone. Realizing the item Mukoa stole is the SoZyuTo, the Gekirangers arrive to find Kira, fighting their way through Kira's houseguard with their kung-fu skills. The search seemed hopeless until Mere arrives alongside Rio (whose memory was restored by Long), who easily finds Mukoua. While Ken and Gou tend to Kira, the others fight Mukoua. But Mukoua eats the SoZyuTo before enlarging himself. On Rio's suggestion, the gang form GekiRinTohja once again, who battles Mukoua and wins, with SoZyuTo expelled in the explosion. With SoZyuTo back, Rio, Mere, and the Gekirangers return to their time as the Akō Rōshi Raid begins. However, once back, they find the Beast Origin Village in flames.
34	"Gowan-Gowan's Dain-Dain! Jūken Giant, Kenzan"; Transliteration: "Gowan-Gowan no Dain-Dain! Jūken Kyojin, Kenzan" (Japanese: ゴワンゴワンのダインダイン！獣拳巨神、見参)	Shojiro Nakazawa	Michiko Yokote	Jyan or whole Gekiranger team	October 21, 2007
When the Gekirangers returned from the past back to the Beast Origin Village, they find it consumed in flames. Ken, refusing to accept SaiDain being destroyed in the fire, runs off to the remains of the site with Rio and Mere following. Jyan and the others were about to follow when Kata arrived, revealing that Maku defeated the Kensei before he and the other Kenma had sealed the Kensei into a Dōkokugan so Maku can siphon their lives. While the other Gekirangers battle Kata, Ken battles Rageku after learning she started the fire. But both battles were going horrible for the Gekirangers as Jyan's group proved no match for Kata and were in by Kata's genjutsu Secret Ringi Illusionary Death Prison while Ken was unable to penetrate Rageku's defense. But Ken and Jyan refused to accept defeat, managing to defeat their respective opponents. Infuriated for being humiliated, Kata enlarges and overpowers both GekiFire and GekiTohja Wolf. But having fulfilled his vow, Ken regains SoZyuTo and SaiDain emerges from the ruins to battle the Kenma. Geki Chopper then invokes SaiDain's true power, empowering the Gekirangers with the Beast Power Bloom before defeating Kata in SaiDaiOh. However, the Kensei are still trapped in stone and SaiDain's effect were double-edged as Rio and Mere become even stronger. As for Maku, he isn't bothered by Kata's death, and drinks the life energy he managed to take from the Kensei to become more powerful.
35	"Gyuon-Gyuon! Beast Power Bloom"; Transliteration: "Gyuon-Gyuon! Jūriki Kaika" (Japanese: ギュオンギュオン！獣力開花)	Satoshi Morota	Michiko Yokote	Retsu	October 28, 2007
Due to SaiDain's awakening, the Gekirangers' full power awakens, along with Rio and Mere. However, the Kensei still encased in the Dōkokugan makes Jyan feel guilty and he runs off in haste to find Maku to break the Ringi. After drinking the siphoned lifeforce of the Kensei, Maku is challenged by Rio, whom manages to match him without even turning into Black Lion Rio. Maku however, still considers himself superior decides to handle the Gekirangers himself while allowing Rio to live long enough to see his rivals' demise. He uses the entire Rinshi army to attack the city to lure them out, with the Gekirangers fighting the hordes of Rinshi. Jyan sensed a power what he thought to be Maku, but was actually Rio. Rio informs Jyan that if he was the power he sense then he must have surpassed Maku, and the two fight. As Rio thought, they both had become stronger than before due to being affected by the Beast Power Bloom. With that, Rio tells Geki Red to kill Maku and end their masters' war before they settle their own. Back at the city, Maku easily overpowers the four Gekirangers and was about to kill them when Super Geki Red arrives in time and turns the tables with using the Super SaiBlade to beat the Kenma in a one-on-one battle with his own Kageki Hard Diamond. After encouraging the others to feel their full power, the five Gekirangers combine their qi and signature attacks to defeat Maku. However, Maku enlarges and GekiFire and GekiTohja Wolf are overpowered by him. SaiDaiOh enters and it and Maku prove to be equals as sun sets on the battlefield. But the Gekirangers' refusal to give up results with a new formation: SaiDaiGekiFire. With all three Geki Jūken qi combined, Maku is finally destroyed. Maku's death releases the Kensei from the Dōkokugan Ringi. While the fight occurs, Rageku is horrified that Maku was outmatched by weaker opponents. Long then appears, telling her that she served her purpose and liquifies her before taking her staff to present to Rio. With the Three Kenma dead and Rio mastering their lessons, Long offers him the chance to master a power greater than both Jūken schools: the Gen Jūken.
36	"Mukyu-Mukyu! The Three Thief Sisters"; Transliteration: "Mukyu-Mukyu! Kaitō San Shimai" (Japanese: ムキュムキュ！怪盗三姉妹)	Satoshi Morota	Yūji Kobayashi	Ran	November 4, 2007
At SCRTC, Ken gets frustrated that the other Gekirangers minus Retu want to use SoZyuTo themselves. While this occurs, Retu helps Sharkie in moving Elehung's things until they find a diamond he got from a Hong Kong starlet he dated in the past. This turns out to be the Raspberry Diamond, which costs 20 billion yen and attracts the attention of the Blossom-Storm Sisters, a trio of jewel thieves who seek to take the diamond for its beauty. During the fight, one of the sisters, Cherry, saved Retu from getting hurt. But the sisters are later attacked by a Rinshi who is also after the diamond to bribe Mere into promoting him to the Rinrinshi rank. Retu comes to their rescue, driving the Rinshi away as the two Kensei arrive. Taking them to a Chinese restaurant, Rose and Lily attempt to steal the diamond though using sake, with Cherry refusing to go along and intends to quit. But Rose and Lily refuse to lose the diamond and are over-powered by Retu using his Jaguar-Drunk Fist style. During the fight, the Rinshi returns wearing Butoka armor, succeeding in stealing the gem. Once giving it to Mere, she awards him with her Infinite Violent Waves, but messed up and cause him to enlarge instead. By then, Ken runs in to fight the giant Butoka in SaiDaiOh to prove that SaiDaiOh is his, easily defeating the Butoka-Rinshi. Once the other Gekirangers arrive, the three sisters decide to take their leave while Mere realized the Raspberry Diamond was a fake. Once she returns to Rin Jū Hall, Long introduces to Rio two of the Four Gen Jū Generals, one in a coffin while being dragged in by the other: Gen Jū Baslisk-Ken master Sanyo.
37	"Gyan-Gyan! Useless Arranged Marriage Interview"; Transliteration: "Gyan-Gyan! Omiai Mondō Muyō" (Japanese: ギャンギャン！お見合い問答無用)	Hiroyuki Kato	Michiko Yokote	Retsu	November 11, 2007
Ran's high society past is revealed when her mother, Reiko Uzaki, arrives to SCRTC. After years of searching, Ran's mother found an ideal husband for her daughter. Ran is forced to undergo a marriage interview to meet her ideal husband, with Jyan and the others attempting to stop the interview. But at the Rin Jū Hall, Long explains to Rio and Mere of the Gen Jūken and how they are destined to become its key members before Mere allows Long to convert her Rinki into Genki. Under Rio's orders, Sanyo sends one of his disciples, Gouyu of the Gen Jū Ceto-Ken style, to gather screams and despair. While their plans to stop the marriage interview fail, Jyan senses a "zowazowa" but the scent is different. Ran is halted by her mother, who intends to have her child be happy, but Ran apologizes for not accepting her mother's notion but her path is to protect and takes Reiko to the battlefield. While this occurs, the four Gekirangers were battling Gouyu, only to be greatly outmatched by the new enemy. until Ran arrives at the last second and the team defeats Gouyu with Reiko was watching and understood her daughter feelings. But Gouyu enlarges and overpowers SaiDaiOh, GekiTohja Wolf, and GekiFire single handed. But with her mother's words of encouragement, Ran calls Geki Elephant and uses Geki ElephantFire to knock Gouyu down. SaiDaiOh was overpowered when Sanyo arrives and easily defeat the Gekirangers then they fled. Though they lost, Ran did win her mother's approval of the path she chosen and to remain at SCRTC. Back at the Rin Jū Hall, Mere returns to Rio, reborn as the third Phantom General upon fully embracing the Phantom Ki in her evoked by witnessing Sanyo's power.
38	"Biba-Biba! Another Retsu"; Transliteration: "Biba-Biba! Mō Hitori no Retsu" (Japanese: ビバビバ！もう一人のレツ)	Hiroyuki Kato	Michiko Yokote	Jyan or whole Gekiranger team	November 18, 2007
Though Mere appraised the Phantom Jūken's power, Rio remains unconvinced of it with to undergo the blood-oath. Sanyo decides to send his other disciple, Gen Jū Minotaur-Ken user Shiyuu, to provide further proof for Long. Meanwhile at SCRTC, Retu and Gou get into an argument over Chashu until Shiyuu begins his attack, with Retu cracking his armor. While the Gekirangers were outmatched by Mere testing her newfound powers on them, Shiyuu took advantage to get revenge on Retu. Though hit by Shiyuu's Gengi, Retu is not physically harmed. Gou warns his brother that an attack is always significant no matter how hard the initial blow is. This turns out true when Retu's reflection comes to life and drags Retu into the mirror world so he can take the original's place, with Retu becoming the reflection. While this occurs, Shiyuu enlarged himself and the gang arrive to fight in SaiDaiOh and GekiFire. However, Mirror Retu reveals himself to be a clone of Shiyuu, using GekiFire to attack SaiDaiOh. Though the others fell for Shiyuu's deception, Gou was not as easily fooled and saves Retu, destroying Shiyuu's reflection-clones. The real Shiyuu overpowers until Geki BatTohja Wolf arrives, wounding Shiyuu to be destroyed by SaiDaiOh. While Retu and Gou enjoy a victory meal after the fight, Rio criticizes the Gen Jūken more until Long awakens the Mythical General resting within the coffin Sanyo brought with him: the mysterious Gen Jū Chimera-Ken master Suugu.
39	"Uro-Uro! The Children Don't Return"; Transliteration: "Uro-Uro! Kaeranai Kodomotachi" (Japanese: ウロウロ！帰らない子供たち)	Shojiro Nakazawa	Yūji Kobayashi	Jyan or whole Gekiranger team	November 25, 2007
After getting into a fight with her mother, Natsume runs away and bunks with Jyan with Miki fine with it. The next day, a tired Jyan brings Miki to his room when Natsume starts acting strange, only to find her gone. While searching for her daughter, Miki learns that many other children in the city had mysteriously disappeared without a trace, with horns on their forehead. Jyan and Miki follow some children to find Mere's student, Haku of the Gen Jū Unicorn-Ken style, using his Gengi to control the children. While the other Gekirangers hold Mere off, Geki Red and Miki find the abducted children and Haku himself, who reveals his schemes. Jyan assumes Super Form, only to be overwhelmed by Natsume and the other children under Haku's control. But, by eating her daughter's favorite food, Miki manages to get Natsume to break Haku's hold over her, canceling the Gengi on the others. Without his children army, Haku is defeated by Super Geki Red. But Haku enlarges himself, intending to destroy "the filth".GekiFire attempts to fight in vain until Miki personally pilots SaiDaiOh to extract her maternal wrath on Haku. With Natsume cheering her on, Miki destroys Haku. The Gekirangers see Miki and Natsume off, with Jyan feeling warm. While this all occurs, Rio confronts Suugu, asking if they met before. But Suugu's silence provokes him to assume Black Lion form to fight him to confirm his thoughts. Though he lost to Suugu, Rio sees without doubt that Suugu is the one he had vowed to surpass, the man with white tiger's Geki: Dan.
40	"Head, Bakān! The Shocking Truth"; Transliteration: "Atama, Bakān! Shōgeki no Jijitsu" (Japanese: 頭、バカーン！衝撃の事実)	Shojiro Nakazawa	Michiko Yokote	Jyan or whole Gekiranger team	December 2, 2007
While Gou goes looking for him in the woods as they were looking for mushrooms, Jyan finds Suugu playing an ocarina and feels a "Wafu-Wafu" from him. Jyan attempts to befriend him, but Gou arrives and battles Suugu to Jyan's dismay. Gou is shocked to find that Suugu's fighting stance is the same as Dan, a Beast Arts master who both he and Rio learned from in the past. At SCRTC, Xia Fu cannot believe that Dan still lives as he was killed by Rio long ago. However, Long reveals to Rio that he revived Dan as a puppet that would serve only the Gen Jū King, with the masterless Suugu going on a berserk rampage. He overpowers the Jūken giants single-handedly before being defeated by SaiDaiGekiFire as Rio arrives before the team, revealing that his battle with Dan had not truly ended. On the night Rio was to end his rivalry with him, Dan was already gravely wounded prior to the fight, thus Rio was robbed of a true victory. A dying Dan tells Rio that his true rival is one who will defeat him: Dan's own son, Jyan. Jyan is horrified and confused of this new information as Suugu attempted to kill him. Though the others attempt to keep Suugu from killing his son, Jyan expresses his feelings about family while taking Suugu's beating until Rio emerges in a new form, embracing his destiny as the Gen Jū King. The four Gekirangers battle the Mythical Generals, only to be overpowered by them before Rio blasts them, allowing Jyan time to train for their final confrontation. Rio and his group take their leave, with the war between the Geki Jūken and a fully powered Gen Jūken beginning as Jyan is now in a state of utter pandemonium.
41	"Zushi-Zushi! No More"; Transliteration: "Zushi-Zushi! Mō Yada" (Japanese: ズシズシ！もうやだ)	Noboru Takemoto	Naruhisa Arakawa	Jyan or whole Gekiranger team	December 9, 2007
After Rio assumes his rightful place as the Gen Jū King, Jyan suffers nightmares tied to the recent revelations he learned, placing him in a state of pandemonium. The gang at SRCTC worry for Jyan's sake and mental wellbeing, but Jyan's hestitation and nervous breakdown irrates Gou, who is outraged that Rio didn't see him as his destined rival. At Rin Jū Hall, in spite of Long's intent for world domination, Rio sends Long by himself to prove himself. To that end, Long gives the task to his Twin Phantoms: Mythical-Beast Capricorn-Ken Dorou & Gen Jū Addanc-Ken Sojo. As the Gekirangers fight Sojo, Jyan loses his concentration and runs off as the gang brought out Geki Bazooka. Though Sojo escapes, the fight was actually part of Dorou's master plan to use the Rangers' qi in his alchemy to create his Dorou Grain. Ran manages to catch up with Jyan, who quits being a Gekiranger and runs away back to his forest home near the Beast Origin Village. Knowing where he was running to, Xia Fu decides to reason with Jyan for the team's sake by taking him to an important place to help him understand Dan. While this occur, the Gekirangers find Sojo using the Dorou Grains as Dorou arrive enlarged. While Dorou battles GekiTohja Wolf and SaiDaiOh, Geki Blue uses the SaiBlade to deal with Sojo. But at the last second, the Twin Phantoms tag each other using Sojo's illusion to evade their opponents' respective deathblows. While this occurs, Mere confronts Jyan and Xia Fu as they head to Dan's hometown, refusing to accept Jyan as Rio's rival.
42	"Wasshi-Wasshi Moving On!"; Transliteration: "Wasshi-Wasshi de Norikoero!" (Japanese: ワッシワッシで乗り越えろ！)	Noboru Takemoto	Naruhisa Arakawa	Ken	December 16, 2007
The four Gekirangers are defeated by Long's Twin Phantoms, who use stronger Dorou Grains to seal the four into a gourd like the others for Dorou's Scream Program. Meanwhile, reporting his minions' success, Long advises Rio that his rivalry with Jyan is pointless, only to be knocked down for overestminating Jyan. After surviving their encounter with Mere, Jyan and Xia Fu arrive to Dan's hometown where the Geki Jūken began. Once there, the two find the place in ruins from a landslide, just after Dan is killed by Rio, as Jyan finds a locket with a picture of himself as a baby and the parents he never knew. With Xia Fu speculating Dan's feelings for his son, enabling Jyan to decide not to run away from his troubles and face them head on as a Gekiranger. Regaining his Geki Changer, Jyan assumes Super Form and frees everyone from the gourds. Super Geki Red then battles Long's Twin Phantoms until the others join in. But Long, annoyed that Jyan could defeat his minons, attacks Jyan personally before re energizing his Twin Phantoms to enlarge, use their tag-team to overwhelm the Gekirangers until the tables turn. While Dorou is destroyed by the Geki Beasts, Sojo was destroyed by SaiDaiGekiTohja. Although Jyan is staying with the team with a "wasshiwasshi" feeling, Xia Fu is worried about the golden scale he found in the ruins.
43	"Hapi-Hapi! Merry Christmas, Osu"; Transliteration: "Hapi-Hapi! Merī Kurisumasu, Osu" (Japanese: ハピハピ！メリークリスマス、押忍)	Satoshi Morota	Yūji Kobayashi	Jyan or whole Gekiranger team	December 23, 2007
While Christmas shopping, Ken and Bion Biao meet a young American child named Carl who hates Christmas. But Ken, misunderstanding Carl, brings him to SCRTC's Christmas party. Eventually fed up with everyone, Carl exits SCRTC in a hurry after knocking down the Christmas tree with Miki the only one who knows the truth. Meanwhile, Mere is thinking of a Christmas present for Rio until Long arrives with one of Suugu's Twin Phantoms, Mythical-Beast Hanuman-Ken user Shuen, sent to cause mayhem across the city with his clones to gather screams from the populace. While Ken and Bion Biao attempt to understand Carl's issues in spite of the language barriers, the other Gekirangers battle the massive army of Shuens while the real one escapes to commit arson. While it all occurs, Ken learns from Carl's father, a North Korean diplomat, that the boy's hatred for Christmas stems losing his mother in a car accident, with Ken reasoning with Carl with his similar path before Shuen arrives. While Bion Biao protects Carl, Ken transforms into Geki Chopper and defeats Shuen with the Super SaiBlade, but Shuen enlarges and the Gekirangers bring out SaiDaiOh, GekiFire, and GekiTohja Wolf to battle with Bae commenting while Mere is wearing a special Santa outfit for Rio. Once Shuen is frozen, SaiDaiGekiFire destroys Shuen. Later, the SCRTC gang resume their party at Carl's house, with SaiDaiOh creating an image of Carl's mother as Ken's present to the boy.
44	"Wafu-Wafu! Father's Melody"; Transliteration: "Wafu-Wafu! Tōchan no Merodi" (Japanese: ワフワフ！父ちゃんのメロディ)	Satoshi Morota	Michiko Yokote	Jyan or whole Gekiranger team	January 6, 2008
The SCRTC gang heads to a Shinto Shrine on New Years, with Jyan praying for Suugu to become Dan once more, but Xia Fu says such a wish is impossible due to Suguu's nature. Jyan then vows that if his father can never return, then, at the very least, he will defeat/free him on his own. Meanwhile, Long, fearing Jyan's effect on Rio would halt his true power, receives his permission to "test" Jyan with Suugu and use it as an excuse to kill him. But Mere begins to ponder Long's motives after hearing Sanyo muttering of a new Rio to come soon, until she is ambushed by Gen Jū Cerberus-Ken user Kou, who reveals he's the younger brother of Braco before heading out to attack people to gain a place among the Gen Jū Generals. But as Geki Chopper, Super Geki Blue, and Super Geki Yellow battle Kou and defeat him with SaiDaiOh, Jyan finds Suugu and battles him with Long watching the fight while Mere watched him from behind to know his true intent. Jyan's refusal to give up allows him to defeat Suugu, yet couldn't land the deathblow due to the feelings for his father. But, due to Jyan's desire to hear him play his ocarina one last time, Suugu reawakens as Dan much to Long's shock. Seeing Jyan to be more trouble than he thought, Long decides to kill him himself. But Suugu took the fatal hit and drove Long away before he collapses in near death. While this all occurs, Gou goes to Michelle Peng to ask for a favor, to master Brusa Ee's most powerful Geki Waza to end the Gekirangers' battle against Rio: the Heaven and Earth Disaster Strike.
45	"Pikīn! Showdown of Destiny"; Transliteration: "Pikīn! Shukumei no Taiketsu" (Japanese: ピキーン！宿命の対決)	Satoshi Morota	Michiko Yokote	Jyan or whole Gekiranger team	January 13, 2008
After being mortally wounded by the attack Long intended for Jyan, Suugu/Dan pleas Jyan to kill him. Though reluctant, Jyan deals the deathblow, freeing Dan from his physical form as he tells Jyan to continue his own path, departing into the afterlife. As the others and Xia Fu arrive to comfort a devastated Jyan as he decides to honor his father's wish by fighting Rio, who leaves Rin Jū Hall after feeling a strong surge of Ki, believing it to be Jyan's, only to learn that it's Gou, who had mastered the Heaven and Earth Disaster Strike with intent to settle things. However, Gouyu arrives to protect Rio, only for Geki Violet to easily kill him with the Heaven and Earth in three seconds, receiving Rio's attention. Once in Mythical Beast King Form, Rio and Gou resume the fight that started a decade ago, with Rio easily defeating Gou (the Heaven and Earth Disiaster not working against Rio because he figured out how to counter after seeing it used on Gouyu) and giving him a reality check that they'll never be rivals. Jyan arrives after the fight to end his battle with Rio once and for all, fighting in their most powerful forms, with Rio holding the upper-hand. But while Super Geki Red and Rio have their final battle, Mere arrives too late to stop the fight as Jyan defeats Rio, causing Rio to awaken as the true Gen Jū King Long has envisioned: the mindless Destroyer bent on destroying everything. Though he easily defeated SaiDaiOh after enlarging himself, Mere manages to snap Rio out of it to Long's dismay, returning to normal. After revealing what she learned from interrogating Sanyo, that Long's been using them, Mere takes Rio away with Long pursuing them.
46	"Gyawa-Gyawa Memories"; Transliteration: "Gyawa-Gyawa no Kioku" (Japanese: ギャワギャワの記憶)	Noboru Takemoto	Naruhisa Arakawa	Jyan or whole Gekiranger team	January 20, 2008
Though Rio has awakened as the Gen Jū King as Long intended, Mere manages to snap him out of it and takes him away. Later that night, after Gou returns from a physical check up, the gang were curious about Rio's condition until Jyan sniffs out the scale Xia Fu found at ruins of Dan's hometown, feeling he saw it before. Wanting to know what happened, Xia Fu has Gorie use his Geki Waza Sleep-Sleep Fist on Jyan to have himrelive his memories of when he first felt "gyawa-gyawa". In his trance, Jyan's hidden memory is unsealed as he reveals that a dragon wiped out village and its inhabitants before assuming a human form: Long, who then personally murdered Jyan's mother. Meanwhile, Sanyo hunts down Rio under Long's orders, but the interference of Mere's apprentice, Gen Jū Pixie-Ken mistress Hisho, allows them to escape and make their way to where Rio lost his family, which the Gekirangers came after Xia Fu had a horrific feeling that Rio's past is tied to Jyan's. Long reveals that he isn't human, he is an immortal dragon that is bored with world and sets out to create entertainment for himself in the form of the Destroyer, and that he was responsible for creating the Rin Jūken with Maku. After learning of Long's part in Jyan's past, "Hisho" reveals herself to be Long in disguise and explains his intent for Rio to become the Destroyer, revealing Maku was to assume the role until the Kensei sealed him. Answering Rio's demands, Long reveals that he did murdered Rio's family, and wounded Dan, setting up the path for Rio to be conditioned without any emotion but the desire to fight. Rio is horrified by the startling revelation as the Gekirangers were enraged by Long's sick ideology, but the real Hisho arrives and takes the Gekirangers away while Long forces Rio to reveal his last attachment, with Mere arrives to battles Long for Rio's sake. While this occurs, the Gekirangers use the Geki Beasts to destroy Hiso. By the time the gang arrive, Long is about to deal the deathblow on Mere, when Rio takes the hit meant for her. Seeing Mere to be Rio's true final attachment, taking her so Rio can become the Destroyer for good.
47	"Pika-Pika! My Path"; Transliteration: "Pika-Pika! Ore no Michi" (Japanese: ピカピカ！俺の道)	Noboru Takemoto	Naruhisa Arakawa	Jyan or whole Gekiranger team	January 27, 2008
The truth is finally revealed; the Gen Jūken was a front by Long to use Rio, whose path he set up to bring about the end of the world. After Mere was taken, Rio loses his fighting spirit and runs off in a desperate state of mind on his purpose. At SCRTC, as they ask Xia Fu for the whereabouts of Rin Jū Hall to save Mere, Bae arrives to show them the way for Mere's sake as Long tortures her. While Jyan leaves to find Rio, the others head off to rescue Mere, with Gou and Ken facing Sanyo while Ran and Retu reach Mere before having to fight Long in vain. While this occurs, after words fail, Jyan manages to beat some sense into Rio to show him he's no pawn, giving him a path of his own and a true reason to fight, to stop Long's cruelty. The two arrive in time as Long was about to torture Mere some more, freeing her and Retu and Ran. After Rio and Mere finally express their feelings to each other, they force their Genki out of their bodies to Long's horror as he runs out to tell Sanyou to kill them all so they can start anew. While the others defeat Sanyo, Jyan and Rio battle Long together for all the wrongs he committed against them, combining their powers to deliver the deathblow. But Long reforms into a giant as the Gekirangers and their rivals form SaiDaiGekiRinTohja to seemingly destroy him. Soon after, with Rio and Mere having nowhere to go now, Jyan invites them to live at SCRTC, to Ran's and Retu's dismay. But by nightfall, Sanyo emerges with intent to get them for this before he suddenly starts to feel sick.
48	"Saba-Saba! Crucial Fist Judgement"; Transliteration: "Saba-Saba! Iza Ken-Dan" (Japanese: サバサバ！いざ拳断)	Shojiro Nakazawa	Michiko Yokote	Jyan or whole Gekiranger team	February 3, 2008
After defeating Long with the Gekirangers, Rio returns to SCRTC much to the happiness of his teammates Miki and Gou. But the only ones who are not happy with Rio and Mere living with them are Ran and Retu, who cannot forgive the two for the acts they have committed. To settle this, Rio and Mere set out to perform the Fist Judgement, a ceremonial battle where the judge and sinner would battle to the death. While Retu and Ran spend three days training for the Fist Judgement, Jyan attempts to talk Rio and Mere out of it. Rio tells Jyan that he has found a new purpose, to bring the two branch schools together by first burning Rin Jū Hall to the ground. By the third day, the Fist Judgement begins, with Retu fighting Rio while Ran battles Mere. In the middle of the fight, as Rio and Mere deliberately lower their guard, Sanyo immediately stops the proceedings as a revived Long reveals himself. Long then devours Sanyo, an extension of his being, and assumes his true form, the Infinity Dragon, before going after Jyan first for being the one to ruin his schemes. At the last second, Mere takes full brunt of Long's wrath when she shoves Jyan, Ran, Retu from his jaws while being fatally wounded. Jyan asks why Mere would do such a thing, she reveals that she and Rio intend to sacrifice themselves anyway, even if Long had not interfered, thanking Jyan for what he did for them. GekiTohja Wolf and SaiDaiOh battle Long, but are no match for him. After comforting Mere in her final moments, promising to follow her within minutes, Rio infuses the Gekirangers with the Rinki of the entire Akugata, promising Jyan a rematch, before entering Long's body to destroy him from the inside, killing himself in the process. The Gekirangers' mourning for Rio is cut short as Long regenerates and mocks Rio's sacrifice, saying that he can never die. Swearing on Rio and Mere's sacrifice while putting on the Kenma' Bracelet, Jyan intends to stop Long once and for all.
49	"Zun-Zun! Jūken Will Continue…"; Transliteration: "Zun Zun! Jūken wa, Zutto…" (Japanese: ズンズン！獣拳は、ずっと…)	Shojiro Nakazawa	Michiko Yokote	Jyan or whole Gekiranger team	February 10, 2008
After Long survives Rio's attempt on his life, the Gekiranger battle him for the sake of Rio and Mere, bent on defeating him in spite of the fact that he's immortal. Long assumes his fighting form and overpowers the Gekirangers before attacking the city to take on the task of destroying the world himself. The Gekirangers follow, but Jyan, Ran, and Retu are suddenly overcome as the Ringi Rio had placed on them earlier finally takes effect. The three find themselves in a dream version of the Rin Jū Hall, where Rio and Mere reveal the three Kenma in human form. The three Kenma then teach the Gekirangers to master their fighting styles and ultimate technique. Meanwhile, Gou and Ken battle Long on their own, losing to him until the seven Kensei arrive to restrain him in vain as obligated by their Jūken way. But Long breaks loose of their Geki Waza and defeat all seven singlehandedly. But Sha Fu reveals they were a distraction as the three Gekirangers arrive, mastering the Kenmas' power to finish Rio's plan and the means to defeat Long: bringing the two Jūken schools back into one. Combining their Geki with the Rinki Rio provided them, the three Gekirangers manage to turn the tables on Long, though he still isn't concerned because they can't kill him. The Gekirangers reveal that they don't need to as they use the Ringi of Kenma, Dōkokugan, to seal Long away into a golden orb. After pondering on what to do with the sealed Long, Jyan suggests to be his jailer, with him, Ran, and Retu deciding to take their own students to ensure Long would never be freed. Three months later, both Ran and Retu become teachers, teaching the Jūken to their own pupils with Natsume as Retu disciple as Jyan gives them, Miki, and Xia Fu his goodbyes before taking his leave to see the world and teach the Jūken. He then visits Ken at SCRTC Meisters, and then Gou as he and Bae take their own leave to make up for lost time, before beginning his journey. Months later, while showing his skills to a group of children in Hong Kong, Jyan meets a boy who looks similar to a young Rio, taking him under his wing.
