= Sotaro =

Japanese actor and model (1986-)

- 聡太郎
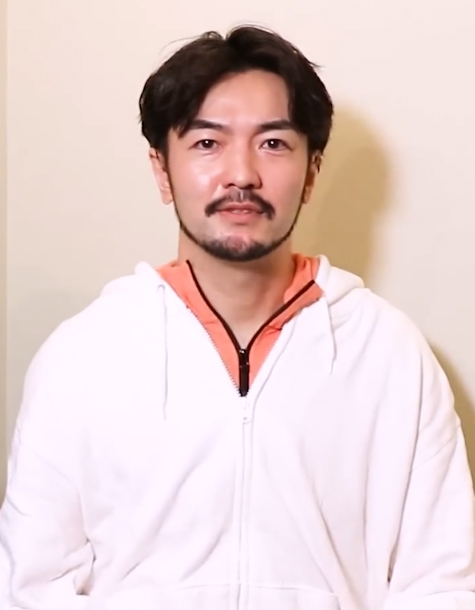
- Sotaro in 2022
- Born: Sotaro Yasuda; January 29, 1986 (age 40); Newport Beach, California, U.S.
- Citizenship: Japan
- Occupations: actor, model
- Years active: 2004–present
- Height: 180 cm (5 ft 11 in)
- Website: www.umarts.net/sotaro/

Sotaro Yasuda (Japanese: 保田 聡太郎, Hepburn: Yasuda Sōtarō; born January 29, 1986), known mononymously as Sotaro (聡太郎, Sōtarō), is an American-born actor and model based in Japan. He was born in Newport Beach, California. He is best known for his portrayal of Ken Hisatsu/GekiChopper in the 2007 Super Sentai series Juken Sentai Gekiranger.

== Biography ==
Sotaro was born in Newport Beach, California to a Japanese-American family. He attended Corona del Mar High School and University High School in Irvine, where he was the club president for the Japanese Club. He is attended at Keio University in Japan as an economics major.

He is the youngest of three brothers, one of which is Naohisa Adachi (足立 直久, Adachi Naohisa), who was known for his role as Kengo Tachibana/B-Fighter Kuwaga (橘健 吾／ビーファイタークワガー, Tachibana Kengo/Bīfaitā Kuwagā) in B-Fighter Kabuto.

== Filmography ==
Year	Title	Role	Other notes	References
2005	Into the Sun	Maitre D'		
2006	Nishimura Kyōtaro Suspense Totsukawa Keibu Series 37 (西村京太郎サスペンス 十津川警部シリーズ37 特急『あずさ』殺人事件)			
2007	Elite Yankee Saburou (エリートヤンキー三郎 Elite Yankee Saburou)	Yuzuru Fukushi	TV series	
2007	Hotaru no Hikari (ホタルノヒカリ Hotaru no Hikari)		Guest appearance in Episode 1	
2007	Juken Sentai Gekiranger (獣拳戦隊ゲキレンジャー Jūken Sentai Gekiranger)	Ken Hisatsu/Geki Chopper		
2008	"Namida no Saki ni" by Crystal Kay (涙のさきに)	Male lead	Music video	
2015 - 2016	Kamen Rider Ghost (仮面ライダーゴースト Kamen Raidā Gōsuto)	Jabel		
