= Yuka Hirata =

Japanese actress

- 平田 裕香
- Born: September 15, 1983 (age 42); Sapporo, Hokkaido, Japan
- Occupations: Actress; voice actress; gravure idol; tarento
- Years active: 1998–present
- Agent: Across Entertainment
- Height: 158 cm (5 ft 2 in)

Yuka Hirata (平田 裕香, Hirata Yuka; born September 15, 1983) is a Japanese actress, voice actress, tarento, and gravure idol from Hokkaido. She portrayed Mele in the Super Sentai Series Juken Sentai Gekiranger. She has also appeared in Food Fight, an episode of Carlos, and several idol videos.

In 2010, she appeared in the live-action film, Wonderful World, with voice actors, Mamoru Miyano, Tomokazu Sugita, Tomokazu Seki, Showtaro Morikubo and Daisuke Namikawa.

== Filmography ==
=== Movies ===
- Juken Sentai Gekiranger: Nei-Nei! Hou-Hou! Hong Kong Decisive Battle - Mele (2007)
- Juuken Sentai Gekiranger vs. Boukenger - Mele (2008)
- Engine Sentai Go-onger vs. Gekiranger - Mele (2009)
- Kamen Rider Ghost: The 100 Eyecons and Ghost's Fated Moment - Himiko (2016)
- Uchu Sentai Kyuranger vs. Space Squad - Mele (2018)

=== Television dramas ===
- Rokubanme no Sayoko - Tōko Hirabayashi (2000)
- Juken Sentai Gekiranger - Mele (2007)
- Kamen Rider W - Kyoko Todoroki (2010)
- Unofficial Sentai Akibaranger - Nurse Hirata (2013)

=== Television animation ===
- Shikabane Hime: Aka - Ruo Minai (2008)
- Cross Game - Risa Shido (2009)
- Hajime No Ippo: New Challenger - Kumi Mashiba (2009)
- Sengoku Otome: Momoiro Paradox - Masamune Date (2011)
- Yu-Gi-Oh! Arc-V - Melissa Claire (2015)

=== Original video animation (OVA) ===
- Nozoki Ana - Makiko Terakado (2013)

=== Japanese dub ===
==== Live-action ====
- The Gentlemen - Rosalind Pearson (Michelle Dockery)
- Legends of Tomorrow - Zari Tomaz (Tala Ashe)
- Sunflower (2022 TV Osaka edition) - Masha (Ludmila Savelyeva)
- The Woman King - Shante (Jayme Lawson)

==== Animation ====
- Goat - Olivia Burke
- Trolls World Tour - Satin and Chenille

== Radio ==
=== Radio drama ===
- Nissan A, Abe Reiji: Beyond the Average - Satsuki Himekawa (2009–)
- River Side Cafe - Saki Nonomiya (2013–14)

=== Presenter ===
- Music Line (2014–15)
