= Mayumi Ono (actress) =

Japanese actress

- 小野 真弓
- Born: March 12, 1981 (age 44); Nagareyama, Chiba Prefecture, Japan
- Education: Jumonji Junior College
- Occupations: Actress; entertainer; gravure idol; singer
- Years active: 1999–present
- Agent: Sun Music Production
- Height: 1.6 m (5 ft 3 in)

Mayumi Ono (小野 真弓, Ono Mayumi; born March 12, 1981 in Nagareyama, Chiba Prefecture) is a Japanese actress, entertainer, gravure idol, and singer represented by Sun Music Production. She graduated from Jumonji Junior College.

== Filmography ==
=== Dramas ===
Year	Title	Role	Network	Notes
1999	Hagure Keiji Junjō-ha dai 12 Series	Waitress	TV Asahi	Debut role
2002	Sakura	Magazine reporter	NHK	
2002	Oba-han Keiji! Sasuga Himego 7 Yokohama-kō Namida no Renzoku Satsujin	Department store clerk	TV Asahi	
2003	Mukodono! 2003		Fuji TV	
2003	Dokushin 3!!	Komiya	TV Asahi	
2004	Cosme no Mahō	Mayumi Mizuno	TBS	
2004	Suiyō Premiere	Mother	TBS	
2004	Hontoni Atta Kowai Hanashi Dai 2 Series	Maki Sato	Fuji TV	Episode 9
2006	Yaoh	Meron	TBS	Episodes 2 and 9
2006	Tokumei Kakarichō Hitoshi Tadano	Yukino Kurasawa	TV Asahi	
2007	Sand Chronicles	Shindo Akane	TBS	
2008	Mirai Kōshi Meguru		TV Asahi	
2008	Fukuoka Renai Hakusho	Asami Saito	KBC	
2008	Konkatsu Rikatsu	Yui Nakatani	NHK	
2008	7-ri no Onna Bengoshi	Sanae Iinuma	TV Asahi	2nd Series, Episode 5
2008	Tantei Susumu Samonji		TBS	
2009	Onsen (hi) Dai Sakusen	Saki Shironouchi	TV Asahi, ABC	
2009	Atashinchi no Danshi	Mao Yoshida	Fuji TV	Episode 3
2009	Misa Yamamura Suspense Akai Reikyūsha 24 Shisha Kara no Okurimono	Yuko Oda	Fuji TV	
2009	Kenji Yoko Asahina	Yuriko Nakagawa	TV Asahi	
2009	Mitsuhiko Asami Series		TBS	
2009	Untouchable		ABC, TV Asahi	Episode 3
2010	Arienai!		MBS	Episode 1
2010	Shin Keishichō Sōsaikka 9 Kakari Season 2	Futaba Aizawa	TV Asahi	Episode 8
2010	Tenshi no Dairinin	Tamayo Ishimori	THK	
2011	Sakura Shinjū	Toyoko Oshikawa	THK	
2011	Shihō Kyōkan Yoshiko Hotaka	Natsuko Hiraishi	TV Asahi	
2011	Kasōken no Onna Dai 11 Series	Mai Azusa	TV Asahi	Episode 9
2012	Watashi wa Daikō-ya!	Mizuki Hirose	TV Asahi	
2012	Home Doctor Ai Kamimura		TBS	
2012	Shokatsu Deka	Sanae Izumi	Fuji TV	
2012	Nana-ri no Teki ga Iru!: Mama-tachi no PTA Funtō-ki	Reiko Igarashi	THK	
2012	Kazoku Lesson	Kyoko Nakata	ABC	Episode 5
2012	Iryū Sōsa	Risa Tateishi	TV Asahi	2nd Series Episode 2
2013	Kyotaro Nishimura Travel Mystery	Mayumi Hashiguchi	TV Asahi	
2013	Keishichō Sōsaikkachō 2: Hira Kara Nariagatta Saikyō no Deka	Juri Kokin	TV Asahi	
2013	Ko Kyōto Renzoku Satsujin Jiken × Gekai Shugoro Hatomura	Yuki Miyamoto	Fuji TV	
2013	Tengoku no Koi	Hinako Ebihara	THK	
2013	Da Mashiwe Utamaro III	Oyuki	TV Asahi	
2013	Kumogiri Nizaemon	Oyae	NHK BS Premium	
2014	Kōmuin Yonaoshi the Kōshōjin	Mika Hasabe	TBS	
2014	Ekiben Keiji Tokunosuke Jinbo	Mariko Fukudome	TBS	
2014	Watashi no Kiraina Tantei	Maki Gotokuji	TV Asahi	Episode 7
2014	Kon'ya wa Kokoro Dake Daite	Masami Tamura	NHK BS Premium	Episode 5
2015	Bar Lemon Heart		BS Fuji	Episode 4
2017	Idol x Warrior Miracle Tunes!	Mayumi Yuzuhara	TV Tokyo	

=== Variety series ===
Year	Title	Network	Notes
2007	Emiko Kaminuma no Oshaberi Cooking	ABC	
2008	Sumai Jibun-ryū: DIY Nyūmon	NHK E	
2009	Sumai Jibun-ryū Alpha	NHK E	
2009	Kyō no Ryōri	NHK E	
2009	Chū's Day Comics	MBS	
2009	Asada! Namadesu Tabi Salad	ABC	Monthly guest
2011	Ajiwai Buraritabi	RKB	

=== Radio series ===
Year	Title	Network	Notes
2003	Kazumi to Mayu no Hyper Smile	NCB	
2004	Picha Ran	Nack5	
2006	My Story	MBS Radio, TBS Radio, CBC Radio	
	Kensaku Morita Seishun Spirits	Bay FM	

=== Films ===
Year	Title	Role	Notes
2003	Shin Kage no Gundan	Ayame	
2003	Shin Kage no Gundan II	Ayame	
2003	Shin Kage no Gundan III Jiraika	Kikyo	
2003	Shin Kage no Gundan IV Jiraika	Kikyo	
2006	I am Nihonjin	Saori Miyamoto	
2007	Juken Sentai Gekiranger: Nei-Nei! Hou-Hou! Hong Kong Decisive Battle	Lao Fan	
2007	Kabe Otoko	Kyoko Kanazawa	
2008	Chīsana Koi no Monogatari	Yuki Ogasawara	Lead role
	Kōshō Hito the Movie Time Limit Kōdo 10,000 m no Zunō-sen	Risa Mizuhara	
2012	Route42		
