= Juken Sentai Gekiranger =

Japanese television series

- The title card for Juken Sentai Gekiranger
- Genre: Tokusatsu; Superhero fiction Martial arts Science fantasy Action
- Created by: Toei
- Written by: Michiko Yokote; Naruhisa Arakawa; Genki Yoshimura; Kazuki Nakashima; Yuji Kobayashi; Sho Aikawa
- Directed by: Shojiro Nakazawa; Hiroyuki Kato; Katsuya Watanabe; Masato Tsujino; Noboru Takemoto; Satoshi Morota
- Starring: Hiroki Suzuki; Mina Fukui; Manpei Takagi; Riki Miura; Sotaro; Yuka Hirata; Hirofumi Araki; Naoki Kawano; Kazue Itō; Ichirō Nagai
- Narrated by: Kei Grant
- Opening theme: "Juken Sentai Gekiranger" by Takayoshi Tanimoto
- Ending theme: "Tao" by Ichirou Mizuki
- Composer: Kazunori Miyake
- Country of origin: Japan
- No. of episodes: 49 (list of episodes)

Production
- Producers: Masashi Yagi (TV Asahi); Hideaki Tsukada; Takaaki Utsunomiya (Toei); Kōichi Yada (Toei Agency)
- Production location: Tokyo, Japan (Greater Tokyo Area)
- Running time: 24–25 minutes
- Production companies: TV Asahi; Toei Company; Toei Agency

Original release
- Network: TV Asahi; UX
- Release: February 18, 2007 – February 10, 2008

Related
- GoGo Sentai Boukenger; Engine Sentai Go-onger

Juken Sentai Gekiranger (獣拳戦隊ゲキレンジャー, Jūken Sentai Gekirenjā; Beast Fist Squadron Gekiranger) (Note: "Gekiranger" (ゲキレンジャー, Gekirenjā) is a portmanteau of the Japanese words for "fierce" (激（ゲキ）, geki) and "ranger" (レンジャー, renjā).) is Toei Company's 31st entry in the Super Sentai metaseries. Production began on September 29, 2006, with principal photography beginning on October 6, 2006. It aired on TV Asahi's 2007 Super Hero Time programming block with Kamen Rider Den-O from February 18, 2007, to February 10, 2008, replacing GoGo Sentai Boukenger and was replaced by Engine Sentai Go-onger.

Its footage was used for the American television series, Power Rangers Jungle Fury. Gekiranger was subtitled into Korean as Power Rangers Wild Spirits for South Korean television.

== Story ==
4000 years ago in ancient China, a form of Chinese styled kenpō martial art called Jūken (獣拳; Beast-Fist) was created by a man named Bruce Ee, who came to Japan and built the hidden village Jūgenkyō (獣源郷; Beast Origin Village). Jūken is a martial art in which one mimics the abilities of animals as well as trying to attain spiritual peace. However, dissent grew among the creator's ten students; three of them believed that they should use the suffering and hatred harnessed within humans to increase their power, using their power to assume the monstrous Three Kenma. After Bruce Ee was murdered, the Kenma gathered followers to practice an evil form of the Jūken style known as Rin Jūken Akugata. The other seven students believed that true strength should come from within and engaged their former friends in a great war, ending the fight with a forbidden technique to seal the Kenma powers at the cost of losing their human forms in the process, becoming the Seven Kensei. Followers of the Kensei created the Geki Jūken Beast Arts school: the Jūken of justice whose sport discipline enhances the human body with the self-produced positive Qi (Note: "Qi" (simplified Chinese: 气; traditional Chinese: 氣; Korean: 기; Japanese: 気; Mongolian: хий; traditional Mongolian:ᠬᠡᠢ; Thai: ชี่; Lao: ຊີວິດ; Khmer: ឈី; Burmese: အသက်) is a concept in Chinese, Vietnamese, Korean, Japanese, Mongolian, Thai, Lao, Khmer, Burmese, Filipino, Malaysian, Bruneian, Indonesian and Tetum cultures that relates to one's life force. It is pronounced as "ch'i" in Chinese, "khí" in Vietnamese, "gi" in Korean, "ki" in Japanese, "khii" in Mongolian, "chi" in Thai, "sivid" in Lao, "chhi" in Khmer, "aasaat" in Burmese, "gi" in Tagalog, "chi" in Malaysian, "chi" in Indonesian and "qi" in Tetum.) called "Geki." It is taught by Grand Master Sha Fu, one of the Seven Kensei, using a sports goods company named SCRTC (スクラッチ, Sukuratchi) (Note: SCRTC is pronounced like the English word scratch.) as a front. Presently, a fallen student from the Geki Jūken school named Rio turned to the Rin Jūken style. He rebuilds the Rinjū Hall and brings the long-dead Rin Jūken users back to life as kyonshi to collect Rinki, Geki's polar opposite Qi, to resurrect the Three Kenma so that through them, he can become stronger. To fight the new Rinjū Hall, Sha Fu trained two youths: Ran Uzaki and Retsu Fukami. Along with Jan Kandou, a feral boy raised by tigers in the woods near Jūgenkyō, the Gekiranger team is formed and later joined by two other Geki Jūken users, Gou Fukami, Retsu's brother and master of the Geki Jū Wolf-Ken style, and Ken Hisatsu, a genius master of the Geki Jū Rhinoceros-Ken style, to save the world from the Akugata's ambitions. However, an even greater evil uses the two sides for its plan.

== Characters ==
=== Main ===
- Gekirangers: The eponymous students and associates of the Geki Jūken Beast Arts martial arts school. Each primary member utilizes a pair of Geki Changer (ゲキチェンジャー, Geki Chenjā) bracers, which harness and amplify their Geki, to transform and store their weapons, such as the Geki Bazooka (ゲキバズーカ, Geki Bazūka) that allows them to destroy human-sized Beast-Men. With the exception of Ken, the entire team when facing off against giant-sized Beast-Men can use their Geki to manifest the auras of their fighting styles' totem animals into physical Geki Beasts (ゲキビースト, Geki Bīsuto) and combine them to form Kenpō Giants (拳法巨人, Kenpō Kyojin). After completing their Kageki training, the primary Gekirangers can use the Super Geki Claws (スーパーゲキクロー, Sūpā Geki Kurō) to become Super Gekirangers (スーパーゲキレンジャー, Sūpā Gekirenjā) where they gain eight jet engine-like vents on their suits, allowing them to channel their Kageki and perform various feats of speed and aerial maneuverability.
  - Jan Kandou (漢堂 ジャン, Kandō Jan): A feral child raised by tigers in the forest outside the Beast Origin Village (獣源郷, Jūgenkyō) who narrowly survived an attack by Long, who intended to kill him due to his lineage, and repressed the memories of the incident. As a result of his upbringing, Jan's speech is impeded. In the present, Master Xia Fu (マスター・シャーフー, Masutā Shā Fū) begins training Jan as the latter embodies the "Unbreakable Body" (アンブレイカブル・ボディ, Anbureikaburu Bodi) aspect of Geki Jūken, which allows him to withstand most forms of pain. Soon after, Jan joins the Gekirangers as Geki Red (ゲキレッド, Geki Reddo) and becomes a practitioner of the Geki Jū Tiger-Ken (激獣タイガー拳, Geki Jū Taigāken) style. He later receives training from Gorie Yen (ゴリー・イェン, Gorī Yen) to master his Heart. In battle, he wields the Geki Nunchaku (ゲキヌンチャク, Geki Nunchaku) sidearm and the twin Geki Saber (ゲキセイバー, Geki Seibā) dao, which can switch between their two-piece Twin Sword Mode (双剣モード, Sōken Mōdo) and their one-piece Twin Sword Combination Mode (双剣合身モード, Sōken Gasshin Mōdo).
  - Ran Uzaki (宇崎 ラン, Uzaki Ran): An employee of SCRTC from a high-class family who initially focuses heavily on her willpower and keeping Heart as the highest part of her training, to the point where she embodies the "Honest Heart" (オネスト・ハート, Onesuto Hāto) aspect of Geki Jūken as Geki Yellow (ゲキイエロー, Geki Ierō), and is a practitioner of the Geki Jū Cheetah-Ken (激獣チーター拳, Geki Jū Chītāken) style. However, a combination of these and her inability to attend to small details leaves her Technique lacking until she receives training from Michelle Peng (ミシェル・ペング, Misheru Pengu). Ran is later appointed leader of the Gekirangers. In battle, she wields the twin Geki Tonfa (ゲキトンファー, Geki Tonfā) sidearms, which can combine to access their bō-like Long Baton (ロングバトン, Rongu Baton) mode, and the Geki Hammer (ゲキハンマー, Geki Hanmā).
  - Retsu Fukami (深見 レツ, Fukami Retsu): An intelligent yet solitary, selfish, and seemingly cold SCRTC employee who holds a grudge against Rio, who he believes killed his brother Gou when he was a child. In pursuit of seeking revenge, he set aside painting to study his brother's fighting style, but believes winning should be like a painting; complete and inspirational. Due to prioritizing Technique in his training, to the point where he embodies the "Fantastic Technique" (ファンタスティック・テクニック, Fantasutikku Tekunikku) aspect of Geki Jūken as Geki Blue (ゲキブルー, Geki Burū), and being a practitioner of the Geki Jū Jaguar-Ken (激獣ジャガー拳, Geki Jū Jagāken) style, Retsu's attention to beauty costs him stamina, leaving his Body at a disadvantage until he receives training from Bion Biao (ピョン・ピョウ, Pyon Pyō). In battle, he wields the Geki Tonfa and the Geki Fan (ゲキファン, Geki Fan), which can produce a second for dual wielding.
  - Gou Fukami (深見 ゴウ, Fukami Gō): Retsu's overprotective older brother and a student in Jūken alongside Miki Masaki and Rio. Despite this, he initially lacks passion for justice and fights only for himself. This resulted in him developing and mastering a dangerous form of Geki called Shigeki (紫激気（しげき）; Violet Fierce Qi) and reinventing the Geki Jū Wolf-Ken (激獣ウルフ拳, Geki Jū Urufuken) style into his personal Fukami Style (深見流, Fukami-ryū). After their parents died, Gou forced Retsu to never practice Jūken before leaving to fight Rio using an imperfect form of a forbidden Geki Waza in an attempt to defeat and seal him. However, he was transformed into a feral werewolf and wandered the world for 15 years until he eventually regains his human form and reluctantly joins the Gekirangers as Geki Violet (ゲキバイオレット, Geki Baioretto). Unlike the primary Gekirangers, Gou embodies the "Iron Will" (アイアン・ウィル, Aian Wiru) aspect of Geki Juken and utilizes the Gong Changer (ゴングチェンジャー, Gongu Chenjā) bracelet to transform due to his Shigeki being incompatible with the Geki Changers.
  - Ken Hisatsu (久津 ケン, Hisatsu Ken): A free-spirited martial arts prodigy who trained at the Beast Origin Village and mastered one of the oldest fighting styles in the Beast Arts, the Geki Jū Rhinoceros-Ken (激獣ライノセラス拳, Geki Jū Rainoserasuken), to overcome the pain of losing his mother at a young age. He was originally meant to join Ran and Retsu as their third teammate, but left to travel abroad due to his Geki Changers being broken and his desire to not restrict himself to the Geki Jūken school. He eventually returns in the present to aid the Gekirangers in their battle against the Rin Jūken Akugata and Gen Jūken schools as the white-colored Geki Chopper (ゲキチョッパー, Geki Choppā) before returning to work at SCRTC Meisters once the aforementioned battle is over. Unlike the primary Gekirangers, Ken embodies the "Amazing Ability" (アメイジング・アビリティ, Ameijingu Abiriti) aspect of Geki Jūken and utilizes the SaiBlade (サイブレード, Saiburēdo) sidearm, which can switch between its handgun-like SaiBlade Finger (サイブレードフィンガー, Saiburēdo Fingā) and blade-like SaiBlade Cutter (サイブレードカッター, Saiburēdo Kattā) modes, to transform. In battle, either he or one of the Super Gekirangers can combine the SaiBlade and a Super Geki Claw to form the Super SaiBlade (スーパーサイブレード, Sūpā Saiburēdo).
- Rio (理央): The leader of the Rin Jūken Akugata school and a practitioner of the Rinjū Lion-Ken (臨獣ライオン拳, Rin Jū Raionken) style who seeks to gain strength so he can never suffer pain again. He initially joined the Geki Jūken school, trained under Master Xia Fu, and formed a close bond with Gou, but was dissatisfied with his progress and left to join the Akugata. During this time, he harnessed the power of Rinki to manifest an armored form called Black Lion Rio (黒獅子リオ, Kurojishi Rio). Throughout the series, Rio forms a rivalry with Jan and cultivates Rinki from his fear, hatred, and jealousy before he is overthrown by Land Kenma Maku (大地の拳魔マク, Daichi no Kenma Maku) and manifests Dorinki from his self-hatred. After receiving more power and killing Maku to regain his position, Rio falls under Long's influence and uses the Gen Jūken school's power to transform into Genjū King Rio (幻獣王リオ, Genjūō Rio), gaining mastery over the Genjū Gryphon-Ken (幻獣グリフォン拳, Gen Jū Gurifonken) style. Eventually, he discovers Long's treachery and joins forces with the Gekirangers to defeat him, sacrificing himself in the process.
- Mele (メレ, Mere): A cruel and malevolent practitioner of the Rinjū Chameleon-Ken (臨獣カメレオン拳, Rinjū Kamereonken) style who possesses an extendable tongue. In battle, she dual wields a pair of sai. Having died in the Geki-Rin Rebellion, Rio used Rinki to revive Mele as a Rinrinshi and grant her a human form a decade prior to the series due to their similar objectives. As a result, she became highly devoted to him and developed an initially unrequited love for him. She aids Rio in his plans throughout the series, during which she becomes a Vermilion Bird/rooster-themed Genshou with mastery over the Genjū Phoenix-Ken (幻獣フェニックス拳, Genjū Fenikkusuken) style while working with the Gen Jūken school, before discovering Long is manipulating Rio and joins the latter in helping the Gekirangers defeat him, sacrificing herself in the process.

=== Recurring ===
- Geki Jūken Beast Arts (激獣拳ビーストアーツ, Geki Jūken Bīsuto Ātsu; Fierce Beast-Fist Beast Arts): A fictional martial arts school that uses a form of Qi (Note: "Qi" (simplified Chinese: 气; traditional Chinese: 氣 and Japanese: 気 is a concept in Chinese and Japanese, among other Asian, cultures that relates to one's life force. It is pronounced "ch'i" in Chinese and "ki" in Japanese.) called Geki (激気（げき; Fierce Qi) as a source of power that manifests from the user's passion for justice and emphasizes the concepts of Heart, Technique, and Body (心技体, Shin-Gi-Tai). The ultimate form of Geki is Kageki (過激気（かげき）; Extreme Qi), which can manifest if the user has mastered the Heart-Technique-Body triangle and possesses a selfless desire to protect others. The sporting goods company SCRTC (スクラッチ, Sukuratchi; pronounced like the English word scratch) serves as a front for the martial arts school, specifically its Gekirangers.
  - Miki Masaki (真咲 美希, Masaki Miki): An assistant to Master Xia Fu, a student of the Geki Jūken Beast Arts, practitioner of the Geki Jū Leopard-Ken (激獣レオパード拳, Geki Jū Reopādoken) style, and the head of SCRTC's special development department who is responsible for designing most of the Gekirangers' weapons. Before training in Geki Jūken, Miki was an infamous sukeban in her youth and former leader of the Kanto Sukeban Alliance.
  - Seven Kensei (七拳聖, Shichi Kensei; Seven Fist Sages): Legendary creators of the Geki Jūken style and students of Bruce Ee (ブルーサ・イー, Burūsa Ī). After three of their fellow students broke off to found the Rin Jūken Akugata as the Three Kenma and killed Bruce Ee, the Kensei battled them in what would later be called the Geki-Rin Rebellion (激臨の大乱, Gekirin no Tairan). The Kensei used a forbidden Geki Waza to seal the Kenmas' bodies, but forcibly turned them into anthropomorphic versions of their fighting styles' totem animals. Following the battle, the Kensei swore a Jūken Oath of nonviolence, only using their skills in defense, established the Geki Jūken in the Beast Origin Village, and created the Sevenfold Barrier of Seven Sages (七重七聖の関, Nanae Nanasei no Seki) to prevent Akugata members from entering its sacred grounds. Following this, three of their members have become the Master Triangle (マスタートライアングル, Masutā Toraianguru) after fully mastering one of the three major aspects of the Geki Jūken Beast Arts while one, Master Xia Fu, has mastered all three.
  - Dan Kandou (漢堂 ダン, Kandō Dan): Jan's father, a practitioner of the Geki Jū Tiger-Ken capable of accessing white tiger-based Geki, star pupil of Master Xia Fu's, and senior master of Rio, Gou, and Miki who is also known as Byakko (ビャッコ, Byakko). When Rio left to join the Akugata, Dan attempted to save him, but was fatally wounded by Long, who used his Geki Soul to create Suugu. While Suugu initially serves Long loyally, Dan's soul would eventually awaken inside the Genshou and rescue his son, who kills him to release his soul.
- Rin Jūken Akugata (臨獣拳アクガタ, Rin Jūken Akugata; Opposing Beast-Fist Akugata): (Note: "Akugata" is made up of the Japanese words aku-gata (悪形, "Evil-Style").) A fictional martial arts school and the Geki Jūken Beast Arts' rival school based in the Rin Jū Hall (臨獣殿, Rin Jū Den), a dojo located on the remote Rin Jū Mountain (臨獣山, Rin Jū Zan), with a natural selection-based philosophy, believing that only those strong enough can survive their harsh and inhuman training methods. Rin Jūken practitioners use a form of Qi called Rinki (臨気（りんき）; Opposing Qi), which is powered by the user's darkness and is used to perform fighting techniques called Ringi (リンギ（臨技）, Ringi; Confrontation Techniques), with the ultimate form of Rinki being Dorinki (怒臨気（どりんき）; Anger Opposing Qi), which manifests through infinite rage and a desire to destroy everything.
  - The Three Kenma (三拳魔, San Kenma; Three Fist Demons): The Akugata's founders and counterpart to the Geki Jūken's Seven Kensei who mastered the Beast-Man Wicked Body Change technique to transform themselves into monstrous anthropomorphic versions of their respective fighting style's totem animals, though they require high amounts of Rinki. Several years prior, they studied under Bruce Ee alongside the Kensei before their desire to use fear and rage to power themselves combined with Maku's grudge against Ee led to them murdering the latter, breaking off to found the Akugata, and starting the Geki-Rin Rebellion. However, the Kenma were defeated by the Kensei, who sealed their souls in three Kenma Bracelets (拳魔の腕輪, Kenma no Udewa) while their bodies were sealed separately. In the present, Rio gains possession of the Kenma Bracelets and steadily resurrects them throughout the series. While they are killed by Long, Jan gets ahold of the Kenma Bracelets and receives their help in defeating Long.
- Bae (バエ): A practitioner of the Geki Jū Fly-Ken (激獣フライ拳, Gekijū Furaiken) style, which turns his vocalizations into Geki, who fought Mele during the Geki-Rin Rebellion, during which he assumed an imperfect anthropomorphic fly-like form, only to be swallowed by Mele before she died. After Rio resurrected her, Bae was resurrected as well and became dependent on her for his survival. Throughout the series, he impulsively serves as a commentator for battles between the Gekirangers' Kenpō Giants and enlarged Beast-Men (獣人, Jūjin) and serves as an unwanted confidante for Mele before she eventually sees him as an equal. When she underwent the Fist Judgment to cleanse herself of her Genki, it entered Bae and fully resurrected him.
- Gen Jūken (幻獣拳; Mythical Beast Fist): A fictional martial arts group who utilize golden Qi called Genki (幻気（げんき）; Mythical Qi), practice Gengi (ゲンギ（幻技）, Mythical Techniques), and seek to exceed the power of natural beasts by mastering the power of mythical creatures via thirteen fighting styles based on the Chinese zodiac and the Four Symbols, the latter of which being represented by the group's leaders, the Four Genshou (四幻将, Shi Genshō).
  - Infinite Dragon Long (無間龍ロン, Mugen Ryū Ron): The malicious Azure Dragon-themed coordinator and leader of the Gen Jūken, the self-proclaimed master of the Gen Jū Dragon-Ken (幻獣ドラゴン拳, Gen Jū Doragonken), and an immortal whose true form is a many-headed golden dragon with terrible power who manipulates humanity on a whim. Because of his immortality and evil nature, he found the world dull and decided to create the "Destroyer", a mindless monster capable of destroying the world. To this end, he manipulated Maku in a failed attempt at turning him into the Destroyer before turning his attention to Rio and attempted to kill the Kandou family for fear that their ability to enhance their Qi would threaten his plans. In the present, Long reveals himself to personally oversee Rio's training until Mele discovers his true intentions and convinces the latter to join her in helping the Gekirangers defeat Long by sealing him in the Dōkokugan (慟哭丸; Wailing Ball), which Jan takes possession of to protect it. During the events of the crossover film Engine Sentai Go-onger vs. Gekiranger, Akugata engineer Meka steals the Dōkokugan and converts it into the Dōkokugan Soul (慟哭丸ソウル, Dōkokugan Sōru) in order to empower Nunchaku Banki as part of his plan to rule the world with the dragon's power. After Jan and Go-on Red defeat Nunchaku Banki, the Dōkokugan's seal is partially undone, allowing Long to emerge and convert Nunchaku Banki into Long Banki (ロンバンキ, Ron Banki) so he can seek revenge on the Gekirangers. He enlarges, but is defeated by the Gekirangers and Go-ongers, which restores the Dōkokugan to normal.
  - Sanyo (サンヨ, San'yo): A talkative, immortal Black Tortoise/snake-themed Genshou, Long's right hand, and master of the Gen Jū Basilisk-Ken (幻獣バジリスク拳, Gen Jū Bajirisukuken) style, which emphasizes gravity-based attacks, that Long created from his own body. After inadvertently revealing Long's true plans to Mele, Sanyo battles her and Geki Yellow, Blue, Violet and Chopper. Despite surviving the battle, Sanyo helps recreate Long, who reabsorbs his subordinate after assuming his true form.
  - Suugu (スウグ, Sūgu): A White Tiger/tiger-themed Genshou and master of the Gen Jū Chimera-Ken (幻獣キメラ拳, Gen Jū Kimeraken) style, which allows him to use Geki and Rin Jūken styles, that Long created from Dan's Geki soul. While he initially lacked Dan's mind, Suugu slowly takes on aspects of the latter's personality and gains access to his memories. This would lead to Suugu overcoming Long's control and sacrificing himself to save Jan.

== Production ==
The trademark for the series was filed by Toei Company on September 19, 2006.

In a final message to the fans, producer Hideaki Tsukada (塚田 英明, Tsukada Hideaki) cites various items he thanks for inspiring the series, including the past Sentai series and the essayist Tatsuru Uchida (内田 樹, Uchida Tatsuru) for teaching them about manga that they reference in the series. The manga mentioned are Fist of the North Star (北斗の拳, Hokuto no Ken), Dragon Ball (ドラゴンボール, Doragon Bōru; 45), Slam Dunk (スラムダンク, Suramu Danku; 31), Judo-bu Monogatari (柔道部物語, Jūdō-bu Monogatari), Ranma ½ (らんま１／２, Ranma nibun-no-ichi), Shigurui (シグルイ), and others. They also thank Sammo Hung, Jet Li, Jackie Chan, Donnie Yen, Michelle Yeoh, and Yuen Biao for allowing them to use their names.

== Episodes ==
At the end of each Lesson (修行, Shugyō), from the first 38 episodes and resuming at the 46-48th episodes, there is a short Beast Arts Academy segment that explains the many pieces of the Gekiranger arsenal, such as the capabilities of the Geki Changers or the performing of Geki Waza.

No.	Title	Directed by	Written by	Central character	Original release date
1	"Niki-Niki! Geki Jūken"; Transliteration: "Niki-Niki! Geki Jūken" (Japanese: ニキニキ！激獣拳)	Shojiro Nakazawa	Michiko Yokote	Jyan or whole Gekiranger team	February 18, 2007
2	"Waki-Waki! Jūken Combination"; Transliteration: "Waki-Waki! Jūken Gattai" (Japanese: ワキワキ！獣拳合体)	Shojiro Nakazawa	Michiko Yokote	Jyan or whole Gekiranger team	February 25, 2007
3	"Shio-Shio! Cleaning Power"; Transliteration: "Shio-Shio! Sōjiryoku" (Japanese: シオシオ！そうじ力)	Katsuya Watanabe	Michiko Yokote	Rio	March 4, 2007
4	"Zowa-Zowa! The Five Venom-Ken"; Transliteration: "Zowa-Zowa! Godokuken" (Japanese: ゾワゾワ！五毒拳)	Katsuya Watanabe	Michiko Yokote	Ran	March 11, 2007
5	"Uja-Uja! What Should I Do?"; Transliteration: "Uja-Uja! Dōsuryaīno?" (Japanese: ウジャウジャ！どーすりゃいいの？)	Noboru Takemoto	Michiko Yokote	Retsu	March 18, 2007
6	"Juwān! What's That?"; Transliteration: "Juwān! 'tte, Nani?" (Japanese: ジュワーン！って、何？)	Noboru Takemoto	Michiko Yokote	Jyan or whole Gekiranger team	March 25, 2007
7	"Shuba-Shuba Dancing!"; Transliteration: "Shuba-Shuba Odorou!" (Japanese: シュバシュバ踊ろう！)	Shojiro Nakazawa	Naruhisa Arakawa	Jyan or whole Gekiranger team	April 1, 2007
8	"Koto-Koto… Intently Koto-Koto"; Transliteration: "Koto-Koto… Hitasura Koto-Koto" (Japanese: コトコト・・・ひたすらコトコト)	Shojiro Nakazawa	Naruhisa Arakawa	Mele	April 8, 2007
9	"The Kena-Kena Woman"; Transliteration: "Kena-Kena no Onna" (Japanese: ケナケナの女)	Satoshi Morota	Genki Yoshimura	Jyan or whole Gekiranger team	April 15, 2007
10	"Jara-Jara Attack! The First Errand"; Transliteration: "Jara-Jara Shūgeki! Hajimete no Otsukai" (Japanese: ジャラジャラ襲撃！はじめてのおつかい)	Satoshi Morota	Michiko Yokote	Ran	April 22, 2007
11	"Ukya-Ukya! Jūken Armament"; Transliteration: "Ukya-Ukya! Jūken Busō" (Japanese: ウキャウキャ！獣拳武装)	Noboru Takemoto	Michiko Yokote	Rio	April 29, 2007
12	"Zowan-Zowan! Rin Jūken Training Starts"; Transliteration: "Zowan-Zowan! Rin Jūken, Shugyō Kaishi" (Japanese: ゾワンゾワン！臨獣拳、修行開始)	Noboru Takemoto	Shō Aikawa	Retsu	May 6, 2007
13	"Shin-Shin! The Spirit's Dance"; Transliteration: "Shin-Shin! Seirei no Mai" (Japanese: シンシン！精霊の舞い)	Masato Tsujino	Genki Yoshimura	Retsu	May 13, 2007
14	"Netsu-Netsu! Forget the Technique"; Transliteration: "Netsu-Netsu! Waza wo Sutero" (Japanese: ネツネツ！技を捨てろ)	Masato Tsujino	Genki Yoshimura	Ran	May 20, 2007
15	"Howa-Howa! Mama Skills"; Transliteration: "Howa-Howa! Mama Gyō" (Japanese: ホワホワ！ママ業)	Satoshi Morota	Michiko Yokote	Mele	May 27, 2007
16	"Jiri-Jiri! Rin Jū Hall, Extracurricular Class"; Transliteration: "Jiri-Jiri! Rin Jūden, Kagai Jugyō" (Japanese: ジリジリ！臨獣殿、課外授業)	Satoshi Morota	Michiko Yokote	Jyan or whole Gekiranger team	June 3, 2007
17	"Goro-Goro! Teacher and Student Love"; Transliteration: "Goro-Goro! Shitei Ai" (Japanese: ゴロゴロ！師弟愛)	Katsuya Watanabe	Shō Aikawa	Jyan or whole Gekiranger team	June 10, 2007
18	"Sharkin-Kīn! The Body is Strong"; Transliteration: "Shakkin-Kīn! Karada, Tsuyoi" (Japanese: シャッキンキーン！身体、強い)	Katsuya Watanabe	Shō Aikawa	Rio	June 24, 2007
19	"Gokin-Gokin! Showdown with Rio"; Transliteration: "Gokin-Gokin! Rio to Taiketsu" (Japanese: ゴキンゴキン！理央と対決)	Noboru Takemoto	Michiko Yokote	Jyan or whole Gekiranger team	July 8, 2007
20	"Gicho-Gicho! Triangle Opposition Match"; Transliteration: "Gicho-Gicho! Toraianguru Taikō Sen" (Japanese: ギチョギチョ！トライアングル対抗戦)	Noboru Takemoto	Michiko Yokote	Jyan or whole Gekiranger team	July 15, 2007
21	"Biki-Biki-Biki-Biki! Extremely Kageki"; Transliteration: "Biki-Biki-Biki-Biki! Kageki ni Kageki" (Japanese: ビキビキビキビキ！カゲキに過激気)	Satoshi Morota	Michiko Yokote	Jyan or whole Gekiranger team	July 22, 2007
22	"Kyui-Kyui! Date with a Celebrity"; Transliteration: "Kyui-Kyui! Serebu to Dēto" (Japanese: キュイキュイ！セレブとデート)	Satoshi Morota	Shō Aikawa	Ran	July 29, 2007
23	"Gure-Gure! Sukeban Captain"; Transliteration: "Gure-Gure! Sukeban Kyaputen" (Japanese: グレグレ！スケ番キャプテン)	Katsuya Watanabe	Naruhisa Arakawa	Retsu	August 5, 2007
24	"Garu-Garu! What's This, Little Brother!?"; Transliteration: "Garu-Garu! Nante Kotta, Otōto ga!?" (Japanese: ガルガル！なんてこった、弟が！？)	Katsuya Watanabe	Michiko Yokote	Gou	August 12, 2007
25	"Hine-Hine! Just My Shigeki"; Transliteration: "Hine-Hine! Ore Dake no Shigeki" (Japanese: ヒネヒネ！俺だけの紫激気)	Noboru Takemoto	Shō Aikawa	Jyan or whole Gekiranger team	August 19, 2007
26	"Mohe-Mohe! Consulting your Worries"; Transliteration: "Mohe-Mohe! Onayami Sōdan" (Japanese: モヘモヘ！お悩み相談)	Noboru Takemoto	Shō Aikawa	Jyan or whole Gekiranger team	August 26, 2007
27	"Beran-Beran! Burn, Commentator"; Transliteration: "Beran-Beran! Moeyo Jikkyō" (Japanese: ベランベラン！燃えよ実況)	Shojiro Nakazawa	Kazuki Nakashima	Jyan or whole Gekiranger team	September 2, 2007
28	"With Bishi-Bishi Pikīn Osu!"; Transliteration: "Bishi-Bishi Pikīn de Osu!" (Japanese: ビシビシピキーンで押忍！)	Shojiro Nakazawa	Michiko Yokote	Ken	September 9, 2007
29	"Guda-Guda Here-Here! Shopping"; Transliteration: "Guda-Guda Here-Here! Shoppingu" (Japanese: グダグダヘレヘレ！ショッピング)	Satoshi Morota	Naruhisa Arakawa	Ken	September 16, 2007
30	"The Sei-Sei and Dou-Dou Woman"; Transliteration: "Sei-Sei de Dō-Dō no Onna" (Japanese: セイセイでドウドウの女)	Satoshi Morota	Naruhisa Arakawa	Ken	September 23, 2007
31	"We Muni-Muni!"; Transliteration: "Oretachi Muni-Muni!" (Japanese: 俺たちムニムニ！)	Katsuya Watanabe	Yūji Kobayashi	Jyan or whole Gekiranger team	September 30, 2007
32	"Zowangi-Zowango! The Gathering, Beast Origin Village"; Transliteration: "Zowangi-Zowango! Shūketsu, Jūgenkyō" (Japanese: ゾワンギゾワンゴ！集結、獣源郷)	Katsuya Watanabe	Michiko Yokote	Jyan or whole Gekiranger team	October 7, 2007
33	"Fure-Fure Gatchiri! Kung Fu Chūshingura"; Transliteration: "Fure-Fure Gatchiri! Kanfū Chūshingura" (Japanese: フレフレガッチリ！カンフー忠臣蔵)	Shojiro Nakazawa	Naruhisa Arakawa	Ken	October 14, 2007
34	"Gowan-Gowan's Dain-Dain! Jūken Giant, Kenzan"; Transliteration: "Gowan-Gowan no Dain-Dain! Jūken Kyojin, Kenzan" (Japanese: ゴワンゴワンのダインダイン！獣拳巨神、見参)	Shojiro Nakazawa	Michiko Yokote	Jyan or whole Gekiranger team	October 21, 2007
35	"Gyuon-Gyuon! Beast Power Bloom"; Transliteration: "Gyuon-Gyuon! Jūriki Kaika" (Japanese: ギュオンギュオン！獣力開花)	Satoshi Morota	Michiko Yokote	Retsu	October 28, 2007
36	"Mukyu-Mukyu! The Three Thief Sisters"; Transliteration: "Mukyu-Mukyu! Kaitō San Shimai" (Japanese: ムキュムキュ！怪盗三姉妹)	Satoshi Morota	Yūji Kobayashi	Ran	November 4, 2007
37	"Gyan-Gyan! Useless Arranged Marriage Interview"; Transliteration: "Gyan-Gyan! Omiai Mondō Muyō" (Japanese: ギャンギャン！お見合い問答無用)	Hiroyuki Kato	Michiko Yokote	Retsu	November 11, 2007
38	"Biba-Biba! Another Retsu"; Transliteration: "Biba-Biba! Mō Hitori no Retsu" (Japanese: ビバビバ！もう一人のレツ)	Hiroyuki Kato	Michiko Yokote	Jyan or whole Gekiranger team	November 18, 2007
39	"Uro-Uro! The Children Don't Return"; Transliteration: "Uro-Uro! Kaeranai Kodomotachi" (Japanese: ウロウロ！帰らない子供たち)	Shojiro Nakazawa	Yūji Kobayashi	Jyan or whole Gekiranger team	November 25, 2007
40	"Head, Bakān! The Shocking Truth"; Transliteration: "Atama, Bakān! Shōgeki no Jijitsu" (Japanese: 頭、バカーン！衝撃の事実)	Shojiro Nakazawa	Michiko Yokote	Jyan or whole Gekiranger team	December 2, 2007
41	"Zushi-Zushi! No More"; Transliteration: "Zushi-Zushi! Mō Yada" (Japanese: ズシズシ！もうやだ)	Noboru Takemoto	Naruhisa Arakawa	Jyan or whole Gekiranger team	December 9, 2007
42	"Wasshi-Wasshi Moving On!"; Transliteration: "Wasshi-Wasshi de Norikoero!" (Japanese: ワッシワッシで乗り越えろ！)	Noboru Takemoto	Naruhisa Arakawa	Ken	December 16, 2007
43	"Hapi-Hapi! Merry Christmas, Osu"; Transliteration: "Hapi-Hapi! Merī Kurisumasu, Osu" (Japanese: ハピハピ！メリークリスマス、押忍)	Satoshi Morota	Yūji Kobayashi	Jyan or whole Gekiranger team	December 23, 2007
44	"Wafu-Wafu! Father's Melody"; Transliteration: "Wafu-Wafu! Tōchan no Merodi" (Japanese: ワフワフ！父ちゃんのメロディ)	Satoshi Morota	Michiko Yokote	Jyan or whole Gekiranger team	January 6, 2008
45	"Pikīn! Showdown of Destiny"; Transliteration: "Pikīn! Shukumei no Taiketsu" (Japanese: ピキーン！宿命の対決)	Satoshi Morota	Michiko Yokote	Jyan or whole Gekiranger team	January 13, 2008
46	"Gyawa-Gyawa Memories"; Transliteration: "Gyawa-Gyawa no Kioku" (Japanese: ギャワギャワの記憶)	Noboru Takemoto	Naruhisa Arakawa	Jyan or whole Gekiranger team	January 20, 2008
47	"Pika-Pika! My Path"; Transliteration: "Pika-Pika! Ore no Michi" (Japanese: ピカピカ！俺の道)	Noboru Takemoto	Naruhisa Arakawa	Jyan or whole Gekiranger team	January 27, 2008
48	"Saba-Saba! Crucial Fist Judgement"; Transliteration: "Saba-Saba! Iza Ken-Dan" (Japanese: サバサバ！いざ拳断)	Shojiro Nakazawa	Michiko Yokote	Jyan or whole Gekiranger team	February 3, 2008
49	"Zun-Zun! Jūken Will Continue…"; Transliteration: "Zun Zun! Jūken wa, Zutto…" (Japanese: ズンズン！獣拳は、ずっと…)	Shojiro Nakazawa	Michiko Yokote	Jyan or whole Gekiranger team	February 10, 2008

== Specials ==
=== Nei-Nei! Hou-Hou! Hong Kong Decisive Battle ===
Juken Sentai Gekiranger: Nei-Nei! Hou-Hou! Hong Kong Decisive Battle (電影版 獣拳戦隊ゲキレンジャー ネイネイ！ホウホウ！香港大決戦, Den'eiban Jūken Sentai Gekirenjā Nei-Nei! Hō-Hō! Honkon Daikessen) aired alongside Kamen Rider Den-O: I'm Born! starting August 4, 2007. The plot revolves on the Gekirangers, Rio, and Mele fighting the school of Mechung Fu (銘功夫（メカンフー）, Mekanfū) to prevent them from destroying Hong Kong. The events of the movie take place between Lessons 9 and 10.

=== Gekiranger vs. Boukenger ===
In Juken Sentai Gekiranger vs. Boukenger (獣拳戦隊ゲキレンジャーＶＳボウケンジャー, Jūken Sentai Gekirenjā tai Bōkenjā), the Gekiranger team meets up with the team from GoGo Sentai Boukenger. The DVD was released on March 14, 2008, for rental and March 21, 2008, for purchase. This is the first team-up to be in wide-screen, appropriate as Boukenger and Gekiranger were the first Sentai series to be themselves shown in wide-screen. The events of the movie take place between Lessons 35 and 36. The film is dedicated to Machiko Soga who died in 2006

=== Go-onger vs. Gekiranger ===
Initially scheduled for DVD release on March 21, 2009, Engine Sentai Go-onger vs. Gekiranger (炎神戦隊ゴーオンジャーVSゲキレンジャー, Enjin Sentai Gōonjā tai Gekirenjā) features the return of Hiroki Suzuki, Mina Fukui, Manpei Takagi, Riki Miura, Sotaro, Hirofumi Araki, Yuka Hirata, Naoki Kawano, and Kazue Itō reprising their roles as Jan Kandou, Ran Uzaki, Retu Fukami, Gou Fukami, Ken Hisatsu, Rio, Mele, Long, and Miki Masaki from Juken Sentai Gekiranger. The story features the Three Gaiark Ministers and their Nunchaku Banki (ヌンチャクバンキ) teaming up with the last remaining member of the Rin Jū Hall (臨獣殿, Rin Jūden), Meka (メカ), practicer of the Rin Jū Tortoise-Ken (臨獣トータス拳, Rin Jū Tōtasuken) who is after the golden orb that Long was sealed in. To defeat their common foes, the Go-ongers, the Go-on Wings, and the Gekirangers team up with the revived Rio and Mele to fight the new evil team and stop them from releasing Long.

On December 6, 2008, several of the cast members of Go-onger announced on their blogs that there is going to be a second Go-onger movie. The next day, Toei announced on its Go-onger website that the film was going to be Go-onger vs. Gekiranger, and that it was to commemorate the 15th of the Super Sentai V-Cinema VS Series, having started initially with J.A.K.Q. Dengekitai vs. Gorenger in 1978 and revived annually with Chouriki Sentai Ohranger vs. Kakuranger in 1996. The film was released to theaters on January 24, 2009.

=== Kyuranger vs. Space Squad ===
Uchu Sentai Kyuranger vs. Space Squad (宇宙戦隊キュウレンジャーVSスペース・スクワッド, Uchū Sentai Kyūrenjā Bāsasu Supēsu Sukuwaddo) is a V-Cinema special released on August 8, 2018 that features a crossover between Uchu Sentai Kyuranger and Space Squad. Aside from the main cast of Kyuranger, Yuma Ishigaki and Hiroaki Iwanaga (Geki Jumonji and Shu Karasuma in Space Sheriff Gavan: The Movie), Yuka Hirata (Mele), Mitsuru Karahashi (Fuwa Juzo in Samurai Sentai Shinkenger), Kei Hosogai (Basco ta Jolokia in Kaizoku Sentai Gokaiger) and Ayame Misaki (Escape in Tokumei Sentai Go-Busters) return to reprise their respective roles.

== Cast ==
- Jan Kandou: Hiroki Suzuki (鈴木 裕樹, Suzuki Hiroki)
- Ran Uzaki: Mina Fukui (福井 未菜, Fukui Mina)
- Retsu Fukami: Manpei Takagi (高木 万平, Takagi Manpei)
- Gou Fukami: Riki Miura (三浦 力, Miura Riki)
- Ken Hisatsu: Sotaro (聡太郎, Sōtarō; Sotaro Yasuda)
- Rio: Hirofumi Araki (荒木 宏文, Araki Hirofumi)
- Mele: Yuka Hirata (平田 裕香, Hirata Yuka)
- Infinite Dragon Long: Naoki Kawano (川野 直輝, Kawano Naoki)
- Miki Masaki: Kazue Itō (伊藤 かずえ, Itō Kazue)
- Natsume Masaki (真咲 なつめ, Masaki Natsume): Sakina Kuwae (桑江 咲菜, Kuwae Sakina)
- Kentaro Hisatsu (久津 権太郎, Hisatsu Kentarō): Taro Ishida (石田 太郎, Ishida Tarō)
- Sachiko Hisatsu (久津 幸子, Hisatsu Sachiko): Juri Ihata (井端 珠里, Ihata Juri)

=== Voice cast ===
- Master Xia Fu: Ichirō Nagai (永井 一郎, Nagai Ichirō)
- Elehung Kam Po (エレハン・キンポー, Erehan Kinpō): Yū Mizushima (水島 裕, Mizushima Yū)
- Bat Li (バット・リー, Batto Rī): Shūichi Ikeda (池田 秀一, Ikeda Shūichi)
- Sharkie Chan (シャッキー・チェン, Shakkī Chen): Hiroya Ishimaru (石丸 博也, Ishimaru Hiroya)
- Gorie Yen: Ryūzaburō Ōtomo (大友 龍三郎, Ōtomo Ryūzaburō)
- Michelle Peng: Atsuko Tanaka (田中 敦子, Tanaka Atsuko)
- Bion Biao: Takeshi Kusao (草尾 毅, Kusao Takeshi)
- Bae: Akira Ishida (石田 彰, Ishida Akira)
- Sky Kenma Kata (空の拳魔カタ, Sora no Kenma Kata): Rokurō Naya (納谷 六朗, Naya Rokurō)
- Sea Kenma Rageku (海の拳魔ラゲク, Umi no Kenma Rageku): Naoko Kouda (幸田 直子, Kōda Naoko)
- Land Kenma Maku: Hidekatsu Shibata (柴田 秀勝, Shibata Hidekatsu)
- Sanyo: Hideyuki Umezu (梅津 秀行, Umezu Hideyuki)
- Suugu, Dan Kandou (39–40, 42, 45): Kenji Ohba (大葉 健二, Ōba Kenji)
- Narrator: Kei Grant (ケイ・グラント, Kei Guranto)

=== Guest cast ===
- Fake Retsu (38): Shinpei Takagi (高木 心平, Takagi Shinpei)
- Jan's Hong Kong Student (49): Shogo Ehara (江原 省吾, Ehara Shōgo)

== Songs ==
=== Opening theme ===
- "Juken Sentai Gekiranger" (獣拳戦隊ゲキレンジャー, Jūken Sentai Gekirenjā)
  - Lyrics: Neko Oikawa
  - Composition: Takafumi Iwasaki
  - Arrangement: Seiichi Kyōda
  - Artist: Takayoshi Tanimoto with Young Fresh on chorus

=== Ending theme ===
- "Tao" (道（タオ）, Tao)
  - Lyrics: Shoko Fujibayashi
  - Composition: Katsuki Maeda (前田 克樹, Maeda Katsuki)
  - Arrangement: Kazunori Miyake (三宅 一徳, Miyake Kazunori)
  - Artist: Ichirou Mizuki with Young Fresh (Chorus)

=== Character songs ===
Beginning with Lesson 39 and ending with Lesson 45, the Character Songs replaced the Jūken Academy segments and "Tao" as the ending theme. The Juken Sentai Gekiranger Character Song Album was released on December 19, 2007, and includes the following songs and karaoke versions of each song.

- "Susume no Susume" (進めのススメ; "Pursuing Future") performed by Jan Kandou (Geki Red)/Hiroki Suzuki (漢堂 ジャン（ゲキレッド）／鈴木 裕樹, Kandō Jan (Geki Reddo)/Suzuki Hiroki)
- "Run" performed by Ran Uzaki (Geki Yellow)/Mina Fukui (宇崎 ラン（ゲキイエロー）／福井 未菜, Uzaki Ran (Geki Ierō)/Fukui Mina)
- "Just make it out!" performed by Retu Fukami (Geki Blue)/Manpei Takagi (深見 レツ（ゲキブルー）／高木 万平, Fukami Retu (Geki Burū)/Takagi Manpei)
- "Wandering Wolf" performed by Gou Fukami (Geki Violet)/Riki Miura (深見 ゴウ（ゲキバイオレット）／三浦 力, Fukami Gō (Geki Baioretto)/Miura Riki)
- "Sōiu Koto mo, Aru Daro yo" (そういうコトも あるだろよ; "That's it for Me") performed by Ken Hisatsu (Geki Chopper)/Sotaro (久津 ケン（ゲキチョッパー）／聡太郎, Hisatsu Ken (Geki Choppā)/Sōtarō)
- "Chigireta Hane" (ちぎれた羽根; "The Torn Feather") performed by Mele/Yuka Hirata (メレ／平田 裕香, Mere/Hirata Yuka)
- "Kuroki Kodō ~Yuruginai Omoi~" (黒き鼓動～揺るぎない想い～; "Dark Pulse ~Unwavering Desire~") performed by Rio/Hirofumi Araki (理央／荒木 宏文, Rio/Araki Hirofumi)
