= The Dinner Table Detective (2011 TV series) =

- Promotional poster
- Also known as: The After-Dinner Mysteries
- Genre: Mystery drama Comedy
- Based on: The Dinner Table Detective by Tokuya Higashigawa
- Written by: Kuroiwa Tsutomu
- Directed by: Hijikata Masato, Ishikawa Junichi
- Starring: Sho Sakurai; Keiko Kitagawa
- Opening theme: Love Me Back by Koda Kumi
- Ending theme: Meikyu Love Song by Arashi
- Composer: Yugo Kanno
- Country of origin: Japan
- Original language: Japanese
- No. of seasons: 1
- No. of episodes: 10 (1 special)

Production
- Executive producers: Hiroaki Narikawa; Misato Sato
- Producer: Nagai Reiko
- Running time: 54 minutes
- Production companies: Fuji Television; Kyodo Television

Original release
- Network: FNS (Fuji TV)
- Release: October 18 – December 20, 2011

The Dinner Table Detective (謎解きはディナーのあとで, Nazotoki wa Dinā no Ato de; lit. "The After-Dinner Mysteries") is a Japanese television drama series based on the mystery novel series of the same name by Japanese author Tokuya Higashigawa. It premiered on Fuji TV on October 18, 2011. This drama series was subsequently followed two-hour long special episode, then a film sequel.

== Plot ==
Reiko is a rich heiress to a zaibatsu, but she chose to work as a detective. She resents her superior, Kazamatsuri, who always seem to be making illogical deductions that causes murder cases to become cold cases. One day, her butler suddenly announces his retirement, and he chooses Kageyama as his replacement. Reiko realizes that Kageyama's deduction skills are very good after Kageyama solved a seemingly unsolvable mystery. After that, whenever Reiko meets an unsolvable case, she would lay out the details of the case for Kageyama, and he would explain to her how that particular case is solved after dinner. After every case, Kageyama also explains to Reikko some universal truth or human nature that led to each crime being committed.

== Cast ==
- Sho Sakurai as Kageyama, Reiko Hosho's new butler. He has a special interest in solving mysteries, and helps his mistress solve seemingly unsolvable cases. However, he often shames her whenever she asks for help or when she makes a wrong deduction. He is seemingly good at everything, and has a wide range of general knowledge. Coupled with his observant nature, Kageyama manages to solve every single case almost in his first try.
- Keiko Kitagawa as Reiko Hosho, a rich heiress who has begun working undercover as a police detective. As she lacks deductive skills, she is often forced to turn to Kageyama for help. The young Reiko is played by child actress Cocoa Ito.
- Kippei Shiina as Kyoichiro Kazamatsuri, the head of the Serious Crimes Unit at Kunitachi Police Precinct’s Criminal Affairs Division. A bachelor and quasi career detective, he is also Reiko’s superior. He was promoted to be an inspector at a young age, and is known to show off his status as the son of the millionaire owner of Kazamatsuri Motors. Despite his position, he has a tendency of making ridiculous theories and taking credit for others' more-relevant ideas as if he'd thought them up. However, his ridiculous theories sometimes play an important role in helping Kageyama solve cases.
- Toru Nomaguchi as Seiichi Namiki, an assistant detective under Kazamatsuri. He has a cool personality, which sharply contrasts him with Kazamatsuri.
- Katsuo Nakamura as Satoru Yamashige, a crime scene investigator who is an expert in crime scene forensics.
- Anri Okamoto as Azumi Munemori, a female police inspector. Together with Ejiri, they form a duo that worships Kazamatsuri and can be seen serving him during investigation.
- Konatsu Tanaka as Yuka Ejiri, a female police inspector.

== Episodes ==
	Episode title	Romanized title	Translation of title	Broadcast date	Ratings
Ep. 1	殺人現場では靴をお脱ぎください	Satsujingenba de ha kutsu wo o-negi kudasai	Please remove your shoes at a crime scene	October 18, 2011	18.1%
Ep. 2	殺しのワインはいかがでしょう	Koroshi no wain ha ikagadeshou	Would you fancy some deadly wine?	October 25, 2011	16.1%
Ep. 3	二股にはお気をつけください	Futamata ha o-ki wo tsuke kudasai	Please be careful of infidelity	November 1, 2011	16.4%
Ep. 4	花嫁は密室の中でございます	Hanayome ha misshitsu no naka de gozaimasu	The bride is inside the locked room	November 8, 2011	16.7%
Ep. 5	アリバイをご所望でございますか	Aribai o goshomou de gozaimasu ka	Do you require an alibi?	November 15, 2011	15.9%
Ep. 6	綺麗な薔薇には殺意がございます	Kireina bara ni ha satsui ga gozaimasu	The beautiful roses are murderous	November 22, 2011	14.9%
Ep. 7	殺しの際は帽子をお忘れなく	Koroshi no sai ha boushi wo o-wasurenaku	After committing murder please do not forget to take your hat	November 29, 2011	15.1%
Ep. 8	殺意のパーティにようこそ	Satsui no pāti ni youkoso	Welcome to the murderous party	December 6, 2011	15.4%
Ep. 9	聖夜に死者からの伝言をどうぞ	Seiya ni shisha kara no dengon wo douzo	Here is the message from the deceased on this holy night	December 13, 2011	15.2%
Ep. 10	聖夜に死者からの伝言をどうぞ	Seiya ni shisha kara no dengon wo douzo	Here is the message from the deceased on this holy night	December 20, 2011	15.4%
Ratings for Kanto region (average rating: 15.93%)
Special	謎解きはディナーのあとで スペシャル	Nazotoki ha dinā no ato de supesharu	Solve the Mystery after Dinner SP	March 27, 2012	14.7%

Preceded by Zettai Reido (12/07/2011 – 20/09/2011)	Fuji Television Kakku dramas 火曜9時枠; Tuesdays 21:00 – 21:54 (JST)	Succeeded by Strawberry Night (10/01/2012 – 20/03/2012)
