= Tough Nights of Club Indigo =

- Drama poster for Tough Nights of Club Indigo
- Written by: Hayashi Mori; Rika Nezu; Naoya Takayama; Yuki Takeda
- Directed by: Miyako Yasoshima; Manabu Kitagawa; Yoshiko Hoshida
- Country of origin: Japan
- Original language: Japanese

Original release
- Release: January 5 – April 2, 2010

Tough Nights of Club Indigo (インディゴの夜, Indigo no Yoru) is a 2010 Japanese comic drama

== Cast ==
- Yoko Moriguchi as Takahara Akira
- Seiji Rokkaku as Shioya Iwao
- Manpei Takagi as Moichi
- Shinpei Takagi as Mosaku
- Kazuki Kato as Yuya
- Koutaro Tanaka as Yoshida
- Motoki Fukami as Alex
- Masato Wada as Junta
- Takeshi Masu as Nagisa-mama
- Kanna Mori as Tetsu
- Tatsuya Gashuin as Mameshiba
- Akihiro Mayama as Itsuki
- Hironari Amano as Inuman
- Masaki Kaji as DJ Maji
- Hidenori Tokuyama as Kuya
