= Hana Awase =

Japanese video game series

華アワセ (Hana Awase)
- Genre: Otome game
- Video game

Hana Awase: Mizuchi Volume
- Developer: Enterbrain
- Publisher: Kadokawa Group Publishing
- Designed by: Yura (illustrator)
- Genre: Visual novel
- Platform: Windows XP; Windows Vista; Windows 7
- Released: JP: December 5, 2012
- Video game

Hana Awase: Himeutsugi Volume
- Developer: Enterbrain
- Publisher: Kadokawa Group Publishing
- Designed by: Yura
- Genre: Visual novel
- Platform: Windows XP; Windows Vista; Windows 7
- Released: JP: February 26, 2014
- Video game

Hana Awase: Karakurenai/Utsutsu Volume
- Developer: Enterbrain
- Publisher: Kadokawa Group Publishing
- Designed by: Yura
- Genre: Visual novel
- Platform: Windows XP; Windows Vista; Windows 7
- Released: JP: August 19, 2015
- Video game

Hana Awase: Iroha Volume
- Developer: Enterbrain
- Publisher: Kadokawa Group Publishing
- Designed by: Yura
- Genre: Visual novel
- Platform: Windows XP; Windows Vista; Windows 7
- Released: JP: November 22, 2019
- Video game

Hana Awase New Moon
- Developer: Enterbrain
- Publisher: JP: Kadokawa Group Publishing; WW: MangaGamer
- Designed by: Yura
- Genre: Visual novel
- Platform: Nintendo Switch; Windows 10; Windows 11
- Released: WW: October 26, 2023 (Switch); WW: September 12, 2024 (Windows)

Hana Awase (華アワセ; lit. 'Flower Matching') is a series of Japanese otome games developed by Enterbrain and distributed by Kadokawa Group Publishing.

The games were part of Enterbrain's 10th anniversary and are based off the Hanafuda card game.

== Plot ==
Kansen (華遷; lit. 'Flower Shift') is a card game using the Hanafuda cards. Only a select few, known as Kaei (華詠; lit. 'Flower Singers') can draw out the special power of these Hana cards. Most of them are men, and the five with the greatest power within the academy are revered as the Five Brights (五光, Gokou). This story unfolds at Kasen National Academy (華遷国立学園, Kasen Kokuritsu Gakuen), a school that produces rare talents and individuals, and follows the men striving to become the Five Brights and the maidens who dedicate themselves to them.

=== Story ===
The protagonist, Mikoto, unexpectedly transfers to Kasen National Academy. The students at the academy strive every day to become the best Kaei and the Minamo (水妹) who serve them. Amidst this, the protagonist learns that she is a candidate for the legendary Minamo, Senki (華遷). Through Kasen, she interacts with the Five Brights and those around her, and both her abilities and her inner self awaken.

== Characters ==
=== Protagonist ===
Mikoto (みこと, Mikoto)
She transfers to Hanazono after a certain incident. She's not particularly skillful, but easily becomes engrossed in things. She learns about the world of Kasen and becomes absorbed in it. Her hobbies are cooking, sewing, and card games.
In the story, she is depicted as a beautiful girl with a great figure, and is frequently pursued by Karakurenai. She also emits the characteristic allure of the Water Maidens that attracts the opposite sex.
She possesses the potential to become Izumihime, the strongest Water Maiden. While seemingly mature, she acts like a girl her age in front of close friends. Having lived with her grandfather during her childhood, she has a slightly old-fashioned side and is very attached to her grandfather. After her grandfather's death, she lived with her parents, but they passed away when she was in middle school. She has lived alone ever since.
In the Karakurenai/Utsutsu arc, before her involvement with Hanazono in the opening of the story, it is revealed that she attended Kaibyaku High School (公立の開闢高校, Kōritsu no Kaibyaku Kōkō), a public school that was her father's alma mater. Later, it is revealed that her mother and grandfather are also graduates of Hanazono.

=== Five Brights ===
Iroha (いろは, Iroha)
Voiced by Takuma Terashima
A third-year student in the Earth Immortal Class of Kasen National Academy.
He is a Kaei. possessing the greatest power in the academy. One of the Five Chosen Brights, and an object of admiration. He exudes sensuality, captivating those who meet his gaze. He possesses a moon in his eyes, and its power is so great that it causes women around him to faint (however, it doesn't work on the protagonist or Momotose).
He is stoic and has little interest in the secular world. In the Himeutsugi arc, he acts without common sense, such as casually undressing in public. He also has poor life skills, and his room is terribly messy. He rarely shows his emotions. He has a huge sweet tooth and always carries sweets with him (he says that sweets are efficient).
He desires Izumihime's awakening. To achieve this, he possesses a dangerous side, willing to resort to forceful means.
Mizuchi (蛟, Mizuchi)
Voiced by Jun Fukuyama
A second-year student in the Koukoku (鴻鵠; lit. 'Majestic Bird') class at Kasen National Academy. He is the member of the Koukoku class and one of the Five Brights. He has a serious and inflexible personality. He has a passionate side and will go to great lengths for the one he loves, but he shows no mercy to traitors, relentlessly pursuing them to the point of ruthlessness.
He is the son of a prestigious family that has produced priests for generations. He is neurotic and cannot tolerate anything that is not done properly. He and Himeutsugi became Five Brights at the same time and are close friends. He worships Iroha and considers his word absolute, while at the same time clashing with Karakurenai due to their differing values.
He has the moon in his left eye, but wears an eyepatch over his right eye, which does not contain the moon. He takes psychiatric medication to suppress his emotions.
Although clumsy, his sincere personality has earned him the respect of the other girls in the Koukoku Group. He is very naive, being unfamiliar with the outside world and having no experience interacting with women.
In the Karakurenai/Utsutsu arc, he enters Kaibyaku High School as an exchange student from Hanazono and meets Himeutsugi, who becomes his best friend there as well.
Himeutsugi (姫空木, Himeutsugi)
Voiced by Shinnosuke Tachibana
A second year of the Koukoku class at Kasen National Academy. A Kaei belonging to the Gekkou Class (月光, Gekkou; lit. 'Moonlight'), and one of the Five Brights. He has a friendly personality and can get along with anyone, regardless of gender. He tends to prioritize others' feelings over his own, sometimes becoming overly empathetic.
He is best friends with Mizuchi, another of the Five Brights. He transferred to Kasen Academy in his second year of high school. He can manipulate water powers. Perhaps because he is worldly, he gives various advice to Mizuchi, who is inexperienced in matters of love. He has androgynous features and is affectionately called "Princess" by the water girls of the Moonlight Class. He is skilled at tennis and possesses inter-high school level abilities.
In the Himeutsugi arc, it is revealed that he lived in Hokkaido during her childhood and, due to his mother's Mizunoto bloodline (癸の血筋, Mizunoto no Chisuji), he can manipulate water like the Water Maiden in Kasen and also possesses the ability to absorb the souls of others and separate them from their bodies.
When he was younger, he couldn't control his abilities properly, which confused his own parents. However, when he was a child, the president of Ginger TV recognized her ability and adopted her along with the sisters Hanagami and Marika, leaving her parents behind. Later, his ability went out of control, separating Marika's soul from her vessel, and he was forced by Hanagami to search for Marika's vessel, suffering frequent punishments. Because of this, although he usually acts kindly to hide it, he is actually afraid of women.
In the Karakurenai/Utsutsu arc, he is not enrolled at Hanazono, but appears as a second-year student at Kaibyaku High School. She belongs to the tennis club and is affectionately called "Hime-senpai" by her juniors. Due to his looks and personality, he is popular among all the students, both boys and girls, and is known as the "Prince of Creation." He is good friends with Shou and also becomes close friends with Mizuchi, who came to Kaibyaku as an exchange student from Hanazono.
Karakurenai (唐紅, Karakurenai)
Voiced by Satoshi Hino
A third-year student in the Ouka class of Hanasen National Academy. He is a Kaei belonging to the Ouka class (桜花, Ouka), and one of the Five Brights. He has a belligerent personality, enjoying battle and bloodshed. He is confident and takes a testing stance. He is self-centered in everything and possessive.
Although his conduct is bad, his academic performance is excellent, so the academy does not take any action and observes quietly. He is a military officer serving the Emperor, the son of the Tora family, and a distant relative of Kintoki Hana and Awa Hana, the chairmen of the Hanaen board. Due to an incident at home, he cannot eat cooked food.
He shows interest in Mikoto when she comes to Hanaen. He has many enemies due to his womanizing and outrageous behavior, but he is very manly and is greatly admired by the Sakura-gumi's water maidens and users. He harbors animosity towards Utsutsu.
Utsutsu (うつつ, Utsutsu)
Voiced by Noriaki Sugiyama
A third-year student in the Houou Class (鳳凰, Houou; lit. 'Phoenix') of Kasen National Academy.
A Kaei belonging to the Phoenix Class, and one of the Five Brights. He was selected as one of the Five Lights when he advanced to his second year, but then went missing. Currently, few people know him, and his background is shrouded in mystery.
He only appears by name in the Mizuchi Arc and Himeutsugi Arc. In the Karakurenai/Utsutsu Arc, Ime (夢, Ime), a male student from the Ouka Class who looks exactly like him, appears.
He has an exceptionally strong attachment to the protagonist, but his true intentions are unknown. He harbors hostility towards Karakurenai.

== Development and release ==
The series was developed as part of Enterbrain's 10-year anniversary.

The original games were originally released as mooks (packaged as physical magazines). All the illustrations in the games were done by Yura (illustrator).

The first game, Hana Awase: Mizuchi-hen (華アワセ 蛟編; lit. 'Hana Awase: Mizuchi Arc') was released on 5 December 2012.

The second game, Hana Awase: Himeutsugi-hen (華アワセ「姫空木編」; lit. 'Hana Awase: Himeutsugi Arc') was released 26 February 2014.

The third game, Hana Awase: Karakurenai/Utsutsu-hen (華アワセ 唐紅/うつつ編; lit. 'Hana-Awase: Karakurenai/Utsutsu Arc') was released on 19 August 2015.

The fourth and final game, titled Hana Awase: Iroha-hen (華アワセ「いろは編」; lit. 'Hana Awase: Iroha Arc') was announced in August 2015 with the release date planned for 2016. However, the game was delayed and released on 22 November 2019.

A compilation game combining all four volumes, titled Hana Awase New Moon (華アワセ 朔, Hana Awase Saku) was announced on 20 March 2023. The game was released on 26 October 2023 worldwide for the Nintendo Switch. The new game features Japanese, English, and Chinese (both Simplified and Traditional) languages. The English version was released by MangaGamer, who originally announced their licensing of the game at Anime Expo 2023. New Moon was also released on Steam on 12 September 2024.

== Stage play ==
A stage play officially titled Stage Play Hana Awase: Based on Hana Awase: Mizuchi-hen (舞台華アワセ ～based on『華アワセ 蛟編』～, Butai hana awase ~ based on “hana awase mizuchi-hen”~) was performed at The Galaxy Theatre in Tokyo from 21 till 26 January 2014. The stage play has an entirely male cast, with the female main character not appearing.

Cast
Character	Actor
Mizuchi	Manpei Takagi
Iroha	Seijiro Nakamura
Himeutsugi	Hiromu Iizuka
Karakurenai	Masakatsu Nemoto
Ono no Sadakuro	Kenichiro Yasui
???	Shinichi Hashimoto
Coin	Masayasu Yagi (Gekidan EXILE)

== Web radio ==
Titled Web Radio Hana Awase (Webラジオ 華アワセ), it began airing on 20 April 2012 on Nippon Cultural Broadcasting's AG-ON channel. Takuma Terashima and Shinnosuke Tachibana were featured on it.

Two DJCDs (disk jockey compact discs) were released on 10 August 2012, and 29 December 2012 respectively.
