= Chisato Morishita =

Japanese politician and actress (born 1981)

- 森下 千里
- Official portrait, 2026

Member of the House of Representatives
- Incumbent
- Assumed office 1 November 2024
- Preceded by: Multi-member district
- Constituency: Tohoku PR (2024–2026); Miyagi 4th (2026–present)

Personal details
- Born: 1 September 1981 (age 45) Nakamura, Nagoya, Japan
- Party: Liberal Democratic
- Height: 166 cm (5 ft 5 in)
- Education: Nagoya Gakuin University
- Occupation: Politician
- Website: www.morishitachisato.com ameblo.jp/morishitachisato

Chisato Morishita (森下千里, Morishita Chisato; born 1 September 1981) is a Japanese politician, former gravure idol, tarento, actress and race queen from Nagoya, Aichi Prefecture, Japan. Her popularity as race queen opened the doors for her singing and acting career. She has been Parliamentary Vice-Minister of Environment within Prime Minister Sanae Takaichi's cabinet since 2025. She is also a member of the House of Councillors representing Tohoku PR since 2024.

In 2004, she portrayed Zero Suit Samus in a series of commercials for Metroid: Zero Mission in Japan. She also wrote a "Play Diary" for the Metroid: Zero Mission official site, which was a strategy guide for the first part of Zero Mission, and also contributed signed flyers and standees, which were distributed as rewards for a speedrun contest.

In 2019, Morishita retired from the entertainment industry.

== Political career ==
In April 2021, Morishita was elected Chief of the 5th Election District Branch in the Miyagi Prefecture for Japan's Liberal Democratic Party. She ran on that district during the House of Representatives election on 31 October, but lost to Jun Azumi from CDP. On 27 October 2024, she ran again in the general election, and she was elected at second place in the Tohoku proportional representative block constituency.

On 21 October 2025, Morishita was appointed as Parliamentary Vice-Minister of Environment (under Minister of the Environment Hirotaka Ishihara) by Prime Minister Sanae Takaichi.

In the 2026 Japanese general election, fueled by the popularity of Sanae Takaichi, a "giant killing" was achieved by defeating Jun Azumi, the Secretary-General of the Centrist Reform Alliance.

== Filmography ==
=== TV series ===
- 2002: Omiai Hourouki (NHK)
- 2002: Kamen Rider Ryuki as Megumi Asano
- 2010: Genya (WOWOW)
- 2011: Kamen Rider OOO (cameo)

=== TV movies ===
- 2006: The School of Water Business (NTV)

=== Anime films ===
- 2006: Bleach: Memories of Nobody

=== Movies ===
- 2003: The Locker
- 2003: Suicide Manual
- 2004: The Locker 2 as Yuna
- 2005: Mail
- 2005: Gurozuka as Ai
- 2006: Kamen Rider Kabuto: God Speed Love as Shura Hokuto
- 2007: Tsubaki Sanjuro
- 2009: Long Caravan
- 2009: Departed to the Future
- 2014: High Kick Angels as J Rose
