= Kakku =

Japanese television time slot

Kakku (火9) is a Japanese abbreviation for Kayō Ku-ji (火曜9時), meaning Tuesday at 9PM. This is a popular time-slot which airs Japanese television dramas. Kakku is Fuji TV's second best-rated time-slot for TV dramas, behind Getsuku (Monday at 9PM). Prior to airing dramas, the time-slot was occupied by the popular quiz show Naruhodo! The World, which ran for a period of fourteen years. The first drama to air on this time-slot was Minikui Ahiru no Ko (1996), starring Goro Kishitani and Takako Tokiwa.

== List of Kakku television dramas ==
=== 1990s ===
1996

- Minikui Ahiru no Ko
- Nurse no Oshigoto
- Konna Watashi ni Dare ga Shita

1997

- Odoru Daisōsasen
- Sōri to Yobanaide
- Tsuki no Kagayaku Yoru Dakara
- Nurse no Oshigoto 2

1998

- Kirakira Hikaru
- With Love
- Kamisama, Mō Sukoshi Dake
- Naguru Onna

1999

- Kyūmei Byōtō Nijūyoji
- Furuhata Ninzaburō (Season 3)
- Shōshimin Kane
- Out: Tsumatachi no Hanzai

=== 2000s ===
2000

- Omiai Kekkon
- Nurse no Oshigoto 3
- Henshūō

2001

- Joshi Ana.
- Shin Omizu no Hanamichi
- Kyūmei Byōtō Nijūyoji (Season 2)
- Sayonara, Ozu-sensei

2002

- Hatsutaiken
- Seikei Bijin
- Nurse no Oshigoto 4
- Double Score

2003

- Okaa-san to Issho
- Kao
- Water Boys
- Anata no Tonari ni Dareka Iru

2004

- Fire Boys: Megumi no Daigo
- Wonderful Life
- Water Boys 2
- Medaka

2005

- Kyūmei Byōtō Nijūyoji (Season 3)
- Rikon Bengoshi: Handsome Woman
- Umizaru Evolution
- 1 Litre no Namida

2006

- Ns' Aoi
- Attention Please
- Dandori: Dance Drill
- Yakushadamashii!

2007

- Konshū, Tsuma ga Uwaki Shimasu
- Hanayome to Papa
- Hanazakari no Kimitachi e
- Abarenbō Mama

2008

- Honey and Clover
- Zettai Kareshi: Kanzen Muketsu no Koibito Robot
- Shibatora: Dougan Keiji Shibata Taketora
- Celeb to Binbo Tarō

2009

- Mei-chan no Shitsuji
- Atashinchi no Danshi
- Kyūmei Byōtō Nijūyoji (Season 4)
- Otomen: Aki
- Liar Game 2

=== 2010s ===
2010

- Nakanai to Kimeta Hi
- Zettai Reido: Mikaiketsu Jiken Tokumei Sōsa
- Joker: Yurusarezaru Sōsakan
- Freeter, Ie o Kau.

2011

- Control: Hanzai Shinri Sōsa
- Namae o Nakushita Megami
- Zettai Reido: Tokushu Hanzai Sennyū Sōsa
- Nazotoki wa Dinner no Ato de

2012

- Strawberry Night
- Legal High
- Iki mo Dekinai Natsu
- Osozaki no Himawari ~Boku no Jinsei, Renewal~

2013

- Last Hope
- Kamo, Kyoto e Iku.
- Kyūmei Byōtō Nijūyoji (Season 5)
- Miss Pilot

2014

- Fukuie Keibuho no Aisatsu
- Bitter Blood
- Asunaro 337 Byoshi
- Subete ga F ni Naru

2015

- Ghost Writer
