= Zettai Reido =

- poster for Zettai Reido
- Genre: Police procedural Drama
- Starring: Aya Ueto; Hiroyuki Miyasako; Sayaka Yamaguchi; Tomomi Maruyama; Hiromi Kitagawa; Ryo Kimura; Takeo Nakahara; Tetta Sugimoto; Kin'ya Kitaōji; Akira Nagata; Keisuke Minami; Megumi Saito; Kenta Kiritani; Takashika Kobayashi; Rie Minemura
- Theme music composer: Love Psychedelico
- Opening theme: "Shadow Behind"
- Ending theme: "Dry Town (Theme of Zero)" "It's You" (Season 2)
- Composer: Yuki Hayashi
- Country of origin: Japan
- Original language: Japanese
- No. of seasons: 5
- No. of episodes: 56

Production
- Executive producers: Aya Moriyasu; Satoko Kashikawa
- Running time: 47 minutes
- Production company: Kyodo Television

Original release
- Network: FNS (Fuji TV)
- Release: April 13, 2010 – December 15, 2025

Zettai Reido (絶対零度; Absolute Zero) is a Japanese police procedural television drama.. The first season, subtitled Mikaiketsu Jiken Tokumei Sōsa (未解決事件特命捜査; lit. "Special Cold Case Investigation"), was set in a fictional version of the Tokyo Metropolitan Police Department division that specializes in investigating cold cases, which is based on an actual division established in Japan in 2009. The first season aired from April 13 to June 22, 2010 on Fuji TV's Kakku time-slot. It premiered to an 18% rating. A special two-hour-long episode which served as conclusion to the first series was aired on July 8, 2011.

Season two of Zettai Reido, subtitled Tokushu Hanzai Sennyū Sōsa (特殊犯罪潜入捜査; lit. "Special Undercover Crime Investigation") takes place a year after the events of the special episode, after Sakuragi and her fellow detectives have been transferred to the undercover investigation division which deals with current crimes. The second season aired from July 12 to September 20, 2011 on Fuji TV's Kakku time-slot. It premiered to a 15.4% rating and ended with a season-high rating of 16.3%. The last leg of the second season featured guest star appearances by Yūsuke Santamaria and You Yokoyama.

Season three of Zettai Reido, subtitled Mizen Hanzai Sennyū Sōsa (未然犯罪潜入捜査; lit. "Pre-emptive Undercover Crime Investigation") takes place when Izumi suddenly disappeared during a special mission (leading to the disbandment of the Special Crimes Investigation Unit following her disappearance). Norito Izawa, who was the ace of Pre-Crime Investigation Team" (known as "Mihan"), a secret experimental unit led by career police officer Sadaharu Todo. Their mission was to prevent future crimes before they occurred, acting on intelligence regarding dangerous individuals identified. The third season aired from July 9 to September 10, 2018 on Fuji TV's Getsuku time-slot. It premiered to a 10.6% rating and ended with a rating of 10.8%. The season four also uses the same subtitle, and aired from January 6 to March 16, 2020. It premiered to a 10.6% rating and ended with a rating of 9.7%.

Season five of Zettai Reido, subtitled Jōhō Hanzai Kinkyū Sōsa (情報犯罪緊急捜査; lit. "Cybercrime Emergency Investigation") aired from October 6 to December 15, 2025 on Fuji TV's Getsuku time-slot. It premiered to a 6.5% rating and ended with a rating of 5.2%.

The opening and ending themes for season one and two are performed by rock duo Love Psychedelico, while the ending theme for season three and four are performed by Leo Ieiri.

== Series synopsis ==
Izumi Sakuragi (Aya Ueto) is an energetic rookie detective assigned to the Tokyo Metropolitan Police Department's special investigations office. This newly established division uses DNA analysis and the latest in forensics science to investigate unresolved cases and cases suspected to involve missing persons.

== Cast and characters ==
=== Season 1 and Season 2 ===
- Aya Ueto as Izumi Sakuragi, a rookie detective with the special investigations office. Due to her inexperience, she is nicknamed Kame (カメ; turtle).
- Hiroyuki Miyasako as Keigo Tsukamoto, a police sergeant who is often partnered with Sakuragi.
- Sayaka Yamaguchi as Ryōko Takamine, the special investigations office's resident criminal profiler.
- Tomomi Maruyama as Yūki Fukazawa, a police inspector with the special investigations office. In season two, he is promoted to the position of Chief Investigator of the eighth section. In season five, he was transferred to the first investigation office.
- Hiromi Kitagawa as Sae Ōmori, the crime lab chief and main technician.
- Ryo Kimura as Shō Takebayashi, the crime lab technician in charge of computer forensics.
- Takeo Nakahara as Shintarō Shiraishi, a detective with the special investigations office.
- Tetta Sugimoto as Takumi Kurata, a senior detective with the special investigations office.
- Kin'ya Kitaōji as Hideo Nagashima, the Director General of the special investigations office.
- Akira Nagata as Yukinari Michio (Season 2)
- Keisuke Minami as Tōru Akiyama (Season 2)
- Megumi Saito as Tomomi Mitsui, a staff with the special investigation office.
- Kenta Kiritani as Shinjirō Takigawa, a detective with the special undercover crime investigations office and Sakuragi's partner.
- Takashika Kobayashi as Ryōhei Isomura, a detective with the special undercover crime investigations office. (Season 2)
- Rie Minemura as Megumi Inohara, a staff with the special investigation office. (Season 2)

=== Season 3 and Season 4 ===
- Ikki Sawamura as Norito Izawa, a police sergeant and a former elite detective from the Public Security Bureau who was transferred to the pre-crime investigation office. While outwardly appearing carefree and nonchalant, he harbors a hidden side that deeply loathes criminals. He also takes command of operations in the field. In season four, he was promoted as the leader of the team.
- You Yokoyama as Toru Yamauchi, a police sergeant with the pre-crime investigation office. Due to his quiet and blunt personality, he is nicknamed Usagi (ウサギ; Rabbit). In season five, he was transferred to the first investigation office and promoted to the position as inspector.
- Tsubasa Honda as Yui Odagiri, a detective with martial arts skills
- Tokio Emoto as Minami Hikotaro
- Mitsuru Hirata as Kaoru Tamura, a veteran police sergeant who was moved between the different divisions within the police. Through his experience, he has acquired various skills.
- Atsushi Ito as Sadaharu Todo
- Yuki Morinaga as Takumi Yoshioka, a police sergeant with the pre-crime investigation office. (Season 4)
- Miki Mizuno as Akari Kosaka, a Ministry of Justice official and chief of pre-crime investigation office. (Season 4)
- Akira Emoto as Sosuke Kagami, a world-renewed white-hat hacker with a track record of arresting the world's most notorious cracker. (Season 4)
- Magy as Seiji Hayakawa, a police sergeant with the first investigation office.
- Michiko Tanaka as Mai Itakura, a detective with the first investigation office who has the feelings with Minami. At the end of season 3, she is married to Minami and retire from the police. (Season 3)
- Soshina as Shun Kadota, a police sergeant with the first investigation office. (Season 4)
- Shuhei Uesugi as Toshiya Kitami, a Ministry of Justice official. (Season 4)
- Manabu Hamada as Masato Sonezaki, chief of Public Security Bureau. (Season 4)
- Mahiro Takasugi as Hiroki Shinoda (his real name was Ayumu Mizushima), a sports photographer. (Season 4)

=== Season 5 ===
- Yasuko Sawaguchi as Nami Ninomiya, a police sergeant with the information-related crime special task force.
- Yuina Kuroshima as Sae Shimizu, an investigator with the information-related crime special task force who was previously worked as a system engineer.
- Hayate Ichinose as Mutsurō Minakata, a police sergeant with the information-related crime special task force.
- Azusa Babazono as Tomoyo Tanabe, a police sergeant with the information-related crime special task force who possesses a wide network of contacts.
- Satoshi Kaneda as Kei Kakegawa, a police sergeant with the information-related crime special task force.
- Yohei Matsukado as Hiroshi Hayami, chief of the information-related crime special task force.
- Ken Yasuda as Shinjirō Sashō, the Deputy Chief Cabinet Secretary
- Yuka Itaya as Kyōko Kiritani, the first female Prime Minister of Japan
- Maya Miura as Mika Sakai, a detective from the first investigation office.
- Ayana Shiramoto as Kana Kiritani, Kyōko's only daughter

== Episodes ==
=== Season 1 (2010–11) ===
No.	Title	Directed by	Written by	Original release date	Rating (Kantō)
1	"The Day to Melt Sadness" "Kanashimi o Tokasu Hi" (悲しみを溶かす日)	Shōsuke Murayama	Masaaki Sakai	April 13, 2010	18.0
2	"The Demon of Having 7 Days till the Statute of Limitation" "Jikō Nanokamae no Mamono" (時効7日前の魔物)	Shōsuke Murayama	Masaaki Sakai	April 20, 2010	14.5
3	"Connection" "Rensa" (連鎖)	Kazuyuki Iwata	Hideya Hamada	April 27, 2010	15.5
4	"Secret" "Himitsu" (秘密)	Kazuyuki Iwata	Masaaki Sakai & Takeru Nakamura	May 4, 2010	12.9
5	"Cold Case Hell" "Mikaiketsu Jiken to Iu Na no Jigoku" (未解決事件という名の地獄)	Shōsuke Murayama	Kazutoshi Tani	May 11, 2010	14.7
6	"The Heartache Left by a Cold Case" "Mikaiketsu Jiken ga Nokosu Kokoro no Itami" (未解決事件が遺す心の痛み)	Shōsuke Murayama	Kazutoshi Tani	May 18, 2010	14.8
7	"Light and Darkness: IT CEO Murder Case" "Hikari to Yami: IT Shachō Satsujin Jiken" (光と闇〜IT社長殺人事件)	Kazuyuki Iwata	Hideya Hamada	May 25, 2010	12.7
8	"Cry" "Dōkoku" (慟哭)	Kazuyuki Iwata	Masaaki Sakai	June 1, 2010	14.4
9	"Release" "Kaihō" (解放)	Shōsuke Murayama	Masaaki Sakai	June 8, 2010	14.6
10	"Devotion" "Kenshin" (献身)	Kazuyuki Iwata	Hideya Hamada	June 15, 2010	13.3
11	"The Day to Shatter Sadness" "Kanashimi o Uchikudaku Hi" (悲しみを打砕く日)	Shōsuke Murayama	Masaaki Sakai	June 22, 2010	12.8
SP	"The Devil Whispers to a Tragedy-stricken Couple: Behind the Death of an OB/GYN doctor, the 14-year-old Murder Case of a Woman and Organ Trade: A Father's Time-transcending Prayer, a Mother's Regret: When the Truth Is Revealed, the Ultimate Cold Case and a Death in the Line of Duty!?" "Higeki no Fuufu ni Akuma no Sasayaki: Sanfujinka Ishi no Shi no Ura ni Juuyonenmae no Josei Satsujin Jiken to Zouki Baibai: Toki o Koeta Chichi no Inori to Haha no Koukai: Shinjitsu o Shiru Toki, Saidai no Mikaiketsu to Shougeki no Junshoku ga!?" (悲劇の夫婦に悪魔の囁き～産婦人科医師の死の裏に14年前の女性殺人事件と臓器売買～時を越えた父の祈りと母の後悔～真実を知る時、最大の未解決と衝撃の殉職が!?)	Shōsuke Murayama	Masaaki Sakai	July 8, 2011	13.9

=== Season 2 (2011) ===
No.	Title	Directed by	Written by	Original release date	Rating (Kantō)
1	"Run Kame! You Slowpoke" "Hashiridase! Noroma na Kame" (走り出せ！のろまなカメ)	Kazuyuki Iwata	Hideya Hamada	July 12, 2011	15.4
2	"Decision" "Ketsudan" (決断)	Kazuyuki Iwata	Hideya Hamada	July 19, 2011	14.2
3	"Sincere Lies" "Seii no Uso" (誠意の嘘)	Genta Satō	Masaaki Sakai	July 26, 2011	13.1
4	"Detective Failure" "Keiji Shikkaku" (刑事失格)	Genta Satō	Tsutomu Kuroiwa	August 2, 2011	11.3
5	"No Intent to Kill" "Mu no Satsui" (無の殺意)	Manabu Kitagawa	Hideya Hamada	August 9, 2011	11.9
6	"Three Lies" "Mittsu no Uso" (3つの嘘)	Kazuyuki Iwata	Masaaki Sakai	August 16, 2011	13.1
7	"Town of Lies" "Itsuwari no Machi" (偽りの街)	Genta Satō	Tsutomu Kuroiwa	August 23, 2011	12.7
8	"An Enemy Appears" "Teki, Arawareru" (敵、現る)	Manabu Kitagawa	Hideya Hamada	August 30, 2011	10.7
9	"The Real Enemy Is" "Shin no Teki wa" (真の敵は)	Kazuyuki Iwata	Hideya Hamada	September 6, 2011	11.0
10	"Showdown Trap" "Taiketsu no Wana" (対決の罠)	Kazuyuki Iwata	Hideya Hamada	September 13, 2011	13.5
11	"What I Saw Upon the Last Day" "Saigo no Hi, Sono Saki ni Mita Mono" (最期の日、その先に見たもの)	Kazuyuki Iwata	Masaaki Sakai	September 20, 2011	16.3

=== Season 3 (2018) ===
No.	Title	Directed by	Written by	Original release date	Rating (Kantō)
1	"Stop the Future Heinious Crime" "Mirai no Kyōaku Hanzai wo Tomero" (未来の凶悪犯罪を止めろ)	Yūichi Satō	Hideya Hamada	July 9, 2018	10.6
2	"A Tragic Revenge: Stop the Murder" "Kanashiki Fukushū Satsujin wo Habame" (悲しき復讐 殺人を阻め)	Yūichi Satō	Hideya Hamada	July 16, 2018	9.6
3	"A Dangerous Individual in a Coma" "Konsui Jōtai no Kiken Jinbutsu" (昏睡状態の危険人物)	Hidenori Jōhō	Shōta Koyama	July 23, 2018	10.8
4	"Murder Along with Bank Robbery" "Satsujin wa Ginkō Gōtō to Tomoni" (殺人は銀行強盗と共に)	Michio Mitsuno	Seiji Inoue	July 30, 2018	11.7
5	"The Beautiful Boy Murderer" "Utsukushiki Shōnen Satsujin-sha" (美しき少年殺人者)	Yūichi Satō	Hideya Hamada	August 6, 2018	10.4
6	"The Tragic Truth Behind Sanctioned Killings" "Seisai Satsujin no Kanashiki Shinjitsu" (制裁殺人の悲しき真実)	Yūichi Satō	Hideya Hamada	August 13, 2018	10.6
7	"A Killer Lurking in the Apartment Complex" "Shūgō Jūtaku ni Hisomu Satsujin-sha" (集合住宅に潜む殺人者)	Hidenori Jōhō	Shōta Koyama	August 20, 2018	10.3
8	"Murder for the Bride" "Satsujin wa Hanayome no Tame ni" (殺人は花嫁のために)	Genta Satō	Keisuke Uyama	August 27, 2018	10.0
9	"The Tragic Killing by the Ultimate Bodyguard" "Saikyō SP no Kanashiki Satsujin" (最強SPの悲しき殺人)	Yūichi Satō	Hideya Hamada	September 3, 2018	11.3
10	"Pity for the Avenger" "Fukushū-sha ni Awaremi wo" (復讐者に憐れみを)	Hidenori Jōhō	Hideya Hamada	September 10, 2018	10.8

=== Season 5 (2025) ===
No.	Title	Directed by	Written by	Original release date	Rating (Kantō)
1	"Information-Related Crime: Keep Breaking Through the Vast, Invisible Net" "Jōhō Hanzai: Mienai Ōkina Ami wo Yaburi Tsuzukero" (情報犯罪 ―見えない大きな網を破り続けろ―)	Ryō Tanaka	Yōsuke Suzuki	October 6, 2025	6.5
2	"A Tragic Revenge: Stop the Murder" "Kanashiki Fukushū Satsujin wo Habame" (悲しき復讐 殺人を阻め)	Yūichi Satō	Hideya Hamada	July 16, 2018	9.6
3	"A Dangerous Individual in a Coma" "Konsui Jōtai no Kiken Jinbutsu" (昏睡状態の危険人物)	Hidenori Jōhō	Shōta Koyama	July 23, 2018	10.8
4	"Murder Along with Bank Robbery" "Satsujin wa Ginkō Gōtō to Tomoni" (殺人は銀行強盗と共に)	Michio Mitsuno	Seiji Inoue	July 30, 2018	11.7
5	"The Beautiful Boy Murderer" "Utsukushiki Shōnen Satsujin-sha" (美しき少年殺人者)	Yūichi Satō	Hideya Hamada	August 6, 2018	10.4
6	"The Tragic Truth Behind Sanctioned Killings" "Seisai Satsujin no Kanashiki Shinjitsu" (制裁殺人の悲しき真実)	Yūichi Satō	Hideya Hamada	August 13, 2018	10.6
7	"A Killer Lurking in the Apartment Complex" "Shūgō Jūtaku ni Hisomu Satsujin-sha" (集合住宅に潜む殺人者)	Hidenori Jōhō	Shōta Koyama	August 20, 2018	10.3
8	"Murder for the Bride" "Satsujin wa Hanayome no Tame ni" (殺人は花嫁のために)	Genta Satō	Keisuke Uyama	August 27, 2018	10.0
9	"The Tragic Killing by the Ultimate Bodyguard" "Saikyō SP no Kanashiki Satsujin" (最強SPの悲しき殺人)	Yūichi Satō	Hideya Hamada	September 3, 2018	11.3
10	"Pity for the Avenger" "Fukushū-sha ni Awaremi wo" (復讐者に憐れみを)	Hidenori Jōhō	Hideya Hamada	September 10, 2018	10.8

== Ratings ==
Season	Average rating (Kantō)
1	14.4
2	13.0
3	10.6

== Awards ==
Year	Award	Category	Nominee	Result
2011	Nikkan Sports Drama Grand Prix	Best Lead Actress	Aya Ueto	Nominated
2012	Nikkan Sports Drama Grand Prix	Best Lead Actress	Aya Ueto	Nominated

== See also ==
- The Enigma Files, UK / BBC Two, 1980
- Cold Squad, CAN / CTV, 1998
- Waking the Dead, UK / BBC One, 2000
- New Tricks, UK / BBC One, 2003
- Cold Case, USA / CBS, 2003
- Signal, South Korea / tvN, 2016
- Signal, Japan / Fuji TV, 2018
