= Dry Town (Theme of Zero)/Shadow Behind =

Single by Love Psychedelico
- Released: May 19, 2010
- Genre: Folk, blues rock
- Length: 15:28
- Label: Victor Entertainment
- Songwriter(s): Love Psychedelico
- Producer(s): Love Psychedelico

Love Psychedelico singles chronology
"Aha! (All We Want)" (2006)	"Dry Town (Theme of Zero)/Shadow Behind" (2010)	"It's You" (2011)

"Dry Town (Theme of Zero)/Shadow Behind" is the twelfth single by Japanese rock duo Love Psychedelico. It was released on May 19, 2010 as their first double A-side and first re-cut single.

== Background ==
"Dry Town (Theme of Zero)" is a newly arranged version of the song "Dry Town" from their second album Love Psychedelico Orchestra, while "Shadow Behind" is the same version that was included on Love Psychedelico's fifth studio album Abbot Kinney, released four months prior to the single. The two songs were chosen as the main and opening themes for the Aya Ueto-led police procedural drama Zettai Reido, respectively. Love Psychedelico's involvement with Zettai Reido marked their first drama tie-in in over six years. "Dry Town (Theme of Zero)" was later included on the band's sixth album, In This Beautiful World (2013).

== Track listing ==
All tracks are written by Love Psychedelico

No.	Title	Arranger(s)	Length
1.	"Dry Town -Theme of Zero-"	Strings arranged by Jun Abe & Love Psychedelico	4:31
2.	"Shadow Behind"		4:16
3.	"Freedom" (Live Version)		6:41
Total length:			15:28

== Charts ==
Chart (2010)	Peak position
Billboard Japan Hot 100 ("Dry Town (Theme of Zero)")	28
Billboard Japan Hot 100 ("Shadow Behind")	76
Billboard Japan Hot Top Airplay ("Dry Town (Theme of Zero)")	27
Billboard Japan Hot Top Airplay ("Shadow Behind")	70
Billboard Japan Hot Singles Sales	37
Oricon Daily Singles	27
Oricon Weekly Singles	37
