= Saiyūki (TV series) =

- 西遊記
- Genre: Fantasy; Shenmo; Action; Adventure
- Created by: Yuji Sakamoto
- Starring: Shingo Katori; Eri Fukatsu; Atsushi Itō; Teruyoshi Uchimura; Asami Mizukawa
- Country of origin: Japan
- No. of episodes: 11

Production
- Running time: 84 minutes (Ep.1,11); 54 minutes (Ep.2-10)

Original release
- Network: Fuji TV
- Release: 9 January – 20 March 2006

Saiyūki (西遊記) is a 2006 Japanese historical TV drama based on the 16th-century Chinese novel Journey to the West. It is a successor to the popular 1970s TV show Saiyūki, known outside Japan as Monkey. There have been three dramas and one special based on Journey to the West that have aired previously, making this one the fifth adaptation in Japan.

Fuji TV made an unusual decision to air this on 9pm every Monday, a primetime slot usually reserved for romantic dramas, hoping to capture both the young and the old by making this choice. While the series started off with viewership nearly reaching 30%, its rating gradually sank, barely making it at 20% at one point; the last episode finished off with 24.7%.

Rather than producing a second season, Fuji TV and Toho produced a feature film version of Saiyūki, that was released in Japan on 14 July 2007. The film was a box office success, becoming the 8th highest-grossing film of 2007 in Japan. The whole plot of the film is loosely based on chapters 32-35 of Journey to the West, Son Gokū trying to save a kingdom (with the help of a young princess) usurped by King Gold Horn and Silver Horn. The DVD was released on 1 January 2008, in two formats: a single disc version with audio commentary and trailers, and a 2-Disc limited collector's edition with documentaries and making-of featurettes; it has also been released to both DVD and Blu-ray Disc in the United Kingdom, under the title Monkey Magic: The Movie.

== Cast ==
- Son Gokū - Shingo Katori
- Sanzōhōshi - Eri Fukatsu
- Cho Hakkai - Atsushi Itō
- Sha Gojō - Teruyoshi Uchimura
- Princess Rin Rin - Asami Mizukawa

== Notable guests ==
- Kadono Takuzo
- Takuya Kimura
- Rieko Miura
- Keiji Mutoh
- Hitomi Takahashi
- Shaku Yumiko
- Ayumi Ishida
- Masaaki Sakai—Portrayed Son Goku in the original Monkey TV series, appeared here as Buddha.

== List of episodes ==
#	Translated title in English	Original title in Japanese	Directed by	Japanese viewership	Original air date
1	Land of Fire	火の国	Kamasaku Sawada	29.2%	9 January 2006
2	Land of Hot Springs	温泉の国	Kamasaku Sawada	24.8%	16 January 2006
3	Land of Dreams	夢の国	Kamasaku Sawada	23.8%	23 January 2006
4	Land of Sands	砂の国	Gaku Narita	22.5%	30 January 2006
5	Land of Children	子供の国	Gaku Narita	22.1%	6 February 2006
6	Land of Forest	森の国	Kamasaku Sawada	20.6%	13 February 2006
7	Land of Ghosts	幽霊の国	Hiromasa Kato	21.2%	20 February 2006
8	Land of Time	時の国	Gaku Narita	20.9%	27 February 2006
9	Land of Flowers	花の国	Gaku Narita	20.7%	6 March 2006
10	Land of Separate Existence	滅法国	Kentaro Takagi	20.5%	13 March 2006
11	Tenjiku	天竺	Kamasaku Sawada	24.7%	20 March 2006

== Soundtrack ==
Selected pieces of score from the series, as composed by Satoshi Takebe, were released on 1 March 2006 by Avex Trax.

The Original Soundtrack to the film, also composed by Satoshi Takebe, was released on 1 August 2007 by Rhythm Zone.

== See also ==
- Saiyuki
- Patalliro Saiyuki!
