= Yoko Mitsuya =

Japanese gravure idol and actress (born 1984)

- Born: 8 November 1984 (age 41); Niiza, Saitama, Japan
- Occupations: Gravure idol; actress
- Years active: 2003–present

Yoko Mitsuya (三津谷 葉子, Mitsuya Yōko; born 8 November 1984) is a Japanese gravure idol and actress.

== Biography ==
Yoko Mitsuya was born in Tokyo but moved to Saitama shortly after she was born. She began practicing ballet as a first grader; her dream was to become a ballerina. When she was in sixth grade, she applied for the Horipro Talent Scout Caravan and was awarded a prize for her work. From there, she made her debut in the photobook Baby Kiss.

Even though Mitsuya was now aiming to become an actress, because of her large bust size for her age, she began doing gravure work at a steady pace. She had been in several publications and photobooks by the time she was 15, and was chosen as the Visual Queen of the year for 2000. Because of her bust size and overall body appearance, Mitsuya was considered chubby and this pressured her to crash diet when she was 16. During this time she stopped gravure work. Furthermore, since her dream of becoming an actress was being deterred due to her gravure work, she considered leaving Horipro and even sent a resume to Starbucks.

Mitsuya made a comeback when she was 18 as a lingerie model and had her first movie role in the 2004 film 69 ~ Sixty Nine. Also in 2004, she appeared in the Kamen Rider Blade movie, Missing Ace as Kamen Rider Larc, a role she would later reprise in the 2009 Kamen Rider Decade. In 2006 she played in a live action movie of Tatsuya Egawa's (semi hentai manga) Tokyo Daigaku Monogatari.

Also in 2006 Mitsuya starred in a ("Electra" like) super hero movie called "Cool Dimension". She played a robot girl in the mini series "Sakura 2 Go" (2007), about a love-torn scientist who recreates his lost love in a robot. In 2007 she also had a role as a supporting actress in "Drift Special - Beauty Battle Deluxe Edition".

Another 2007 role was in the movie "IT Bubble to Neta Onna Tachi " about a girl, dreaming of becoming a star, who travels from the country to Tokyo where she discovers young IT startups and falls in love. In 2008 she played in the movie "Sunshine Days", and was a supporting actress in the series K-tai Investigator 7 and Metal Samurai.

She played in movie "Taksu" (2014), directed by Sugino Kiki, as a wife of a married couple who spends some times staying in Bali, Indonesia. This is the first movie that she was in that included her nude and had a sex scene.

== Filmography ==
=== Film ===
- Seventh Anniversary (2003)
- Kamen Rider Blade: Missing Ace (2004) - Natsumi Miwa
- 69 (2004) - Yumi Sato
- Kazuo Umezu's Horror Theater: Present (2005) - Kaena
- Jam Films S (2005)
- Noriko's Dinner Table (2005) - Tangerine
- Gurozuka (2005) - Maki
- Tokyo University Story (2006) - Haruka Mizuno
- Cool Dimension: Innocent Assassin (2006) - Shiori
- IT Bubble to Neta Onna Tachi (2007)
- Curling Love (2007)
- Sunshine Days (2008)
- 108 (2008)
- Love's Whirlpool (2014) - office lady
- Hanayoi Dochu (2014)
- Taksu / Yokudo (2014) - Yuri
- I Want to Be Loved (2020) - Kaori
- Kyoto Camaro Detective (2022)

=== Television ===
Year	Title	Role
2006	He Who Can't Marry (Kekkon Dekinai Otoko)	
2006	Scum of Lawyers (Bengoshi no Kuzu)	
2007	Time Limit Investigator, Season 2 (Kaette kita jiko keisatsu)	(ep. 3)
2007	Over-the-Shoulder Lover (Katogoshi no Koibito)	
2007	Near Death	
2008-2009	Ketai Sosakan 7	
2009	Kamen Rider Decade	
2009	Woman of the Crime Lab 09	(ep.8)
2011	Onmitsu Happyaku Yacho	(ep. 5-6)
2011	Shitsuren Hoken	Mari Kitamura (ep. 8)
2011	Detective Conan: Kudo Shinichi e no Chousenjou (Meitantei Conan: Kudo Shinichi e no Chousenjou)	
2011	Erika the Secret Agent (Himitsu Chouhouin Erika)	Yuka Yoshikawa (ep. 4)
2012	Detective Kurokawa Suzuki (Deka Kurokawa Suzuki)	Mikage Ichijo (ep. 9)
2013	I Love You	Meiko

== Other works ==
=== DVDs ===
- [2000.03.17] Mai-go
- [2000.06.25] Final Beauty Yoko Mitsuya
- [2000.08.19] Summer Holiday
- [2000.11.15] Pure Girl Duo (with Saori Nara)
- [2001.08.24] Mix Juice (with Mao Miyaji)
- [2001.12.29] Seventeen's Map
- [2002.03.20] Horipro Best Selection 1
- [2002.10.20] Aquatic
- [2003.08.20] On the Roof
- [2003.10.24] No Memory Woman
- [2003.11.25] Su-Ha-Da
- [2004.03.25] Kirakira
- [2004.09.30] Yumeiro no Kaze ~Hazuki no Sou hide~
- [2005.02.28] Gekkan Mitsuya Yoko
- [2005.05.25] Only One Room
- [2005.07.25] Siesta
- [2005.10.22] Gurozuka

=== Photobooks ===
- [1998.04.xx] Pure Girl Duo (with Saori Nara)
- [1998.10.xx] Zinnia
- [1999.03.xx] Mitsuya Yoko
- [1999.09.xx] Vacation
- [2000.11.xx] Dear
- [2001.08.xx] Mix Juice (with Mao Miyaji)
- [2001.12.xx] 思春記
- [2003.08.05] Mystery
- [2004.01.31] Rabuho My Love
- [2004.03.21] Sukinshippu
- [2004.09.22] On the Way
- [2005.01.xx] Gekkan Mitsuya Yoko Shincho Mook 65
