= Loving You (2007 film) =

- Directed by: Kei Horie
- Screenplay by: Saika Kunieda
- Based on: Itsuka Ame ga Furu Yō ni by Saika Kunieda
- Produced by: Kei Horie; Kazushi Miki; Akihiro Itō; Kenji Komatsu
- Starring: Takumi Saitoh; Ryūnosuke Kawai; Yutsuki Katō; Makoto Sakamoto; Yu Tokui; Kanji Tsuda; Yumiko Oka
- Cinematography: Kei Horie; Yūsei Naruse
- Music by: Moku
- Production companies: Trinet Entertainment; Video Planning
- Distributed by: Video Planning
- Release date: 28 July 2007 (Japan)
- Running time: 67 minutes
- Country: Japan
- Language: Japanese

Loving You (いつかの君へ, Itsuka no Kimi e; lit. 'Someday You') is a 2007 Japanese film directed by Kei Horie and based on the manga Itsuka Ame ga Furu Yō ni (いつか雨が降るように; lit. 'Someday It Will Rain') by Saika Kunieda. The film stars Takumi Saitoh as Noboru Fukami and Ryūnosuke Kawai as Kōhei Hayase. The film was released on July 28, 2007.

== Plot ==
Noboru Fukami is a lonely and introverted college student who saves one of his classmates, Kōhei Hayase, from drowning on a lake. Hayase had never paid attention to Noboru before, but after being saved by him he begins to feel confused about his feelings towards the very mysterious Noboru. And if this was not enough, Hayase soon meets Noboru's twin brother, Ryū, who has a very different personality from his brother.

== Cast ==
- Takumi Saitoh as Noboru Fukami/Ryū Fukami
  - Tsubasa and Jun Ogasawara (young Noboru and Ryū)
- Ryūnosuke Kawai as Kōhei Hayase
- Yutsuki Katō as Sayuri Tadokoro
- Makoto Sakamoto as Classmate
- Goki as Classmate
- Yū Tokui as Bartender
- Kanji Tsuda as Teacher
- Yumiko Oka as Classmate
- Shirō Namiki
- Himeko Tōya
- Choi Cheol-ho
- Yoshihiro Ishizuka
- Shūji Ōtsuki

== Production ==
The music was composed by Moku. The theme used for the end credits is "Karatsu youthful" by Jamgo Five.
