= Asami Mizukawa =

Japanese actress (born 1983)

- 水川 あさみ
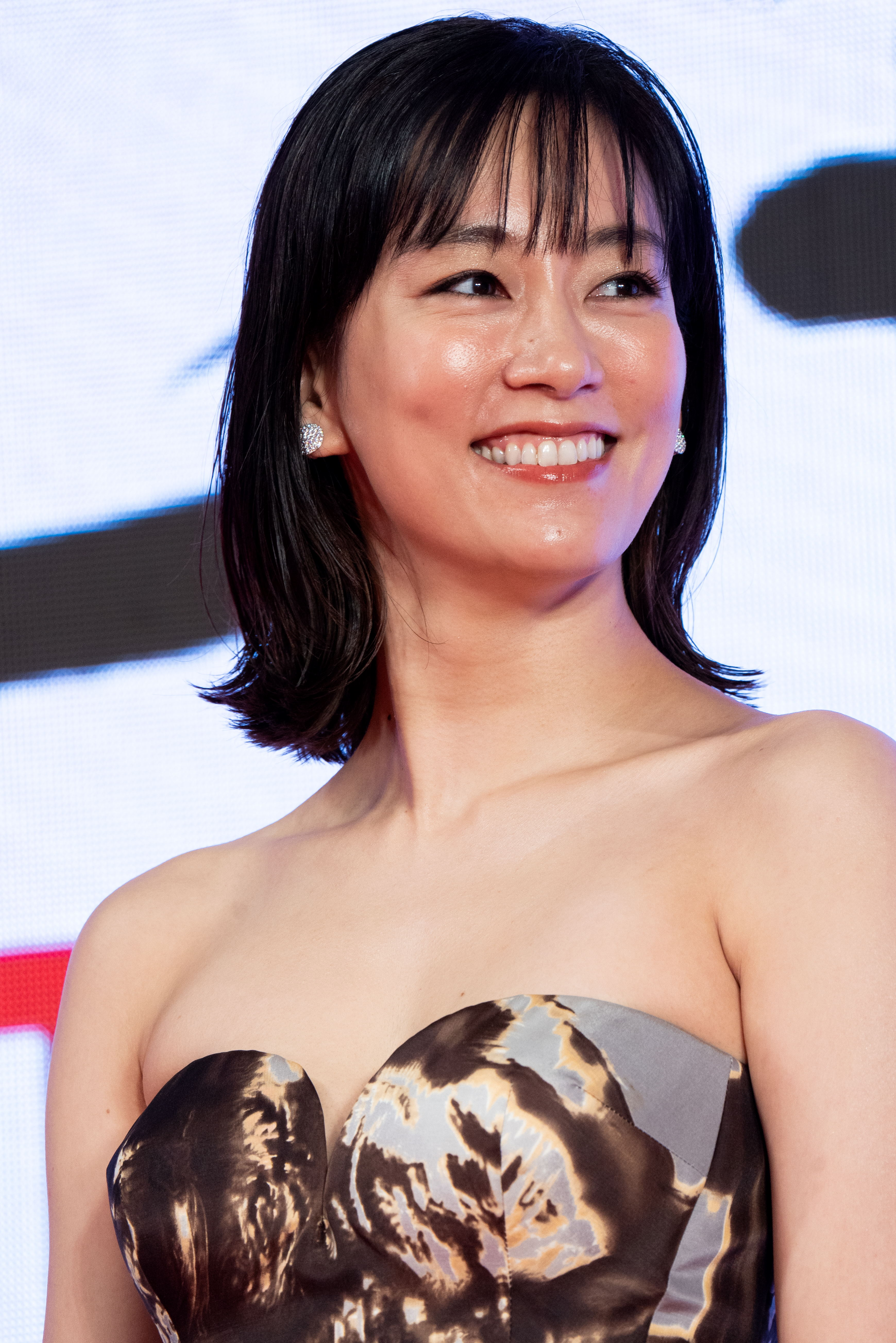
- Mizukawa at Tokyo International Film Festival in 2019
- Born: 水川 啓子 (Keiko Mizukawa); July 24, 1983 (age 42); Kyoto, Japan
- Years active: 1996–present
- Agent(s): Atlantis Cast (1996–2016) sucre (2016–present)
- Height: 1.63 m (5 ft 4 in)
- Spouse: Masataka Kubota (m. 2019)
- Website: am-sucre.com

Asami Mizukawa (水川 あさみ, Mizukawa Asami; born July 24, 1983) is a Japanese actress.

She made her debut in 1996 at age 13 in an advertisement for Asahi Kasei's "Hebel Haus". In 2000, she won the Grand Prix at the “3rd Miss Tokyo Walker” competition (the first winner was Chiaki Kuriyama) and gained the supporting role in the 2002 J-horror film Dark Water. She has since appeared in many films, television dramas, and commercials.

== Personal life ==
Mizukawa married fellow actor Masataka Kubota, their agencies jointly announced that two were engaged to be married. They registered their marriage on September 21, 2019.

== Filmography ==
=== Film ===
Year	Title	Role	Notes	Ref
1997	Tokimeki Memorial			
1997	Shanghai Mermaid Legend Murder Case	Yeung Lailei		
2001	Last Scene			
2001	Go	Korean girl at train station		
2001	Hashire! Ichirō	Arisa Shimada		
2002	Dark Water	16-year-old Ikuko Hamada		
2003	Saru	Ayako Iinuma		
2003	The Locker	Rieka Yajima	Lead role	
2004	Pika**nchi Life is Hard Dakara Happy	Yayoi Kamogawa		
2004	69	Emi Nagayama		
2004	[Is A.]	Usagi		
2004	The Locker 2	Rieka Yajima		
2005	Madamada Abunai Deka	Risa Yūki		
2005	Under The Same Moon		Cameo appearance	
2005	Nagurimono	a prostitute		
2005	Shinku	Miho Tuzuki		
2005	Pray	Maki	Lead role	
2005	School Daze	Natsumi		
2006	Memories of Tomorrow	Keiko Ikuno		
2008	Chameleon	Keiko Koike		
2010	A Good Husband	Ranko Yoshizawa		
2010	Higanjima	Aoyama Rei		
2010	I am		Lead role	
2011	A Honeymoon in Hell: Mr. and Mrs. Oki's Fabulous Trip	Saki Ooki		
2013	Bilocation	Shinobu Takamura	Lead role	
2014	Close Range Love			
2014	Fuku-chan of Fukufuku Flats	Chiho Sugiura		
2016	Black Widow Business	Mayumi Miyoshi		
2018	Roupeiro's Melancholy			
2020	A Beloved Wife	Chika	Lead role	
2020	Good-Bye	Kayo		
2020	Runway	Midori	Lead role	
2020	Midnight Swan			
2020	Underdog			
2023	The Silent Service	Takako Hayami		
2023	Six Singing Women			

=== Television drama ===
Year	Title	Role	Notes	Ref
1997	Bayside Shakedown	Middle school student		
1998	P.A. Private Actress			
1999	Shōshimin Kēn	Taeko Yamamoto		
1999	Abunai Hōkago	Fūka Ishii		
2000	Hanamura Daisuke	Eri Kuroda		
2001	Sayonara Ozu Sensei	Eri Shinoda		
2002	The Long Love Letter	Kaoru Ichinose		
2003	Et Alors	Noriko Sugi		
2003	Stand Up!!	Miyuki		
2004	Mother and Lover	Kei Nagano		
2005	Kaze no Haruka	Nanae Kiuchi	Asadora	
2006	Saiyūki	Rin Rin		
2006	Team Medical Dragon	Miki Satohara		
2006	Nodame Cantabile	Kiyora Miki		
2007	Fūrin Kazan	Hisa	Taiga drama	
2007	Saiyūki	Rin Rin		
2007	Oishii Gohan: Kamakura Kasugai Kometen	Kaede Kasugai		
2007	Team Medical Dragon 2	Miki Satohara		
2008	Nodame Cantabile in Europe	Kiyora Miki	Two-part drama	
2008	Last Friends	Eri Takigawa		
2008	33pun Tantei	Rikako Mutō		
2008	Yume o Kanaeru Zō	Asuka Hoshino	Lead role	
2009	Kaettekosaserareta 33pun Tantei	Rikako Mutō		
2009	GodHand Teru	Kozue Shinomiya		
2009	Orthros no Inu	Nagisa Hasebe		
2011	Gō	Hatsu	Taiga drama	
2012	Tsumi to Batsu: A Falsified Romance	Echika Ameya		
2012	Sarutobi Sansei	Oichi		
2013	3-in-1 House Share	Shio Tsuyama	Lead role	
2014	Shitsuren Chocolatier	Kaoruko Inoue		
2016	Never Let Me Go	Miwa Sakai		
2017	Fugitive Boys	Natsumi Tachibana		
2018	Double Fantasy	Natsu	Lead role	
2018	Segodon	Oryō	Taiga drama	
2022	Don't Call It Mystery	Yoshikazu Miyoshi	Special appearance	
2023	Boogie Woogie	Tsuya Hanada	Asadora	
2024	Laughing Matryoshka	Kanae Michiue	Lead role	
TBA	Shōgun	Aya	Season 2	

=== Other television ===
Year	Title	Role	Notes	Ref
2020	Terrace House: Tokyo 2019–2020	Herself	Guest studio commentator for episodes 39 and 40	

=== Web series ===
Year	Title	Role	Notes	Ref
2016	Tōkyō Joshi Zukan	Aya	Tokyo Women's Guidebook; re-released in 2018 as Tokyo Girl with English subtitles	
2022	Modern Love Tokyo	Mari	Lead role; episode 1	
2024	The Silent Service	Takako Hayami		

== Other work ==
=== Stage ===
- 2005 Soldier's Mind (歩兵の本領, Hohei no Honryō)

=== Music video ===
- 2004 EXILE - "Heart of Gold"

=== Commercials ===
- Asahi Kasei - Hebel Haus (1996)
- 123 Commercial TV stations - Atlanta Olympic (1996)
- Nissan - Ichiro's Nissan (1999)
- NTT West - Area Plus (1999)
- Yotsuya Gakuin - Boat Version (2000)
- Fujiya - Look Chocolate (2000)
- Sega - Phantasy Star Online (2000)
- Eisai - Chocola BB Pure (2000–2002)
- Kadokawa Shoten - Weekly "The Television" (2001)
- Coca-Cola - Sōken Bicha (2002)
- Mos Burger - Vegetable Tsukune Burger (2002)
- NTT docomo Kyūshū - FOMA (2003–2004)
- NHK - Sports Campaign (2004)
- P&G - Pantene (2003-ongoing)
- Kanebo - T'Estimo (2007)
- Casio - Exilim (2007-ongoing)
- Yuna Ito - "Heart" (2007)
- Ito En - Tennen Bikō Jasmine Tea (2007-ongoing)
- Subaru - Stella (2007)
- Nippon Oil - New Slogan Announcement Version (2008-ongoing)
- Sharp - Sharp Naruhodo Gekijō (2008-ongoing)
- Toyota - Zanka Settei Type Plan (2009)
- Ito En - Tea's Tea Bergamot and Orange Black Tea (2009)
- Nippon Oil - Ene-Farm (2009)
- Meiji Seika - Meiji Sweets Gum (2009)
- Toyota - 20 Years Later : Live Action Doraemon : Shizuka (2011)
- Wolt - Who's Wolt? (2021)

== Awards ==
Year	Award	Category	Nominated work(s)	Result	Ref
2020	45th Hochi Film Awards	Best Actress	A Beloved Wife	Won	
2021	75th Mainichi Film Awards	Best Actress	A Beloved Wife	Won	
2021	63rd Blue Ribbon Awards	Best Actress	A Beloved Wife	Nominated	
2021	42nd Yokohama Film Festival	Best Actress	A Beloved Wife and Runway	Won	
2021	94th Kinema Junpo Awards	Best Actress	A Beloved Wife and Runway	Won	
