= Kabadieen! Gekitotsu Dokuro Koko hen =

- Film poster for Kabadieen! Gekitotsu Dokuro Koko hen

Japanese name
- Kanji: カバディーン!!!!!!! 激突・怒黒高校篇
Transcriptions
- Revised Hepburn: Kabadieen! Gekitotsu Dokuro Koko hen
- Directed by: Yuichi Abe
- Starring: Daisuke Watanabe; Manpei Takagi; Syuusuke Saito; James Takeshi Yamada; Ryusuke Nakamura; Ken Ogasawara; Toshihiko Tanaka; Shungo Takasaki
- Release date: October 11, 2014
- Running time: 92 min.
- Country: Japan
- Language: Japanese

Kabadieen! Gekitotsu Dokuro Koko hen (カバディーン!!!!!!! 激突・怒黒高校篇, Kabadieen! Gekitotsu Dokuro Koko hen) is a 2014 Japanese youth sports film directed by Yuichi Abe.

== Cast ==
- Daisuke Watanabe as Atsushi Fushimi
- Manpei Takagi as Kido
- Syuusuke Saito as Minami
- James Takeshi Yamada as Kiryu
- Ryusuke Nakamura as Hattori
- Ken Ogasawara as Zenji
- Toshihiko Tanaka as Kyoshiro
- Shungo Takasaki as Mask
