= Ryūnosuke Kawai =

Japanese actor (born 1983)

- 河合 龍之介
- Born: May 23, 1983 (age 41); Fuchū, Tokyo, Japan
- Occupation: Actor
- Years active: 2003–present
- Known for: Murder on D Street; Hanareushi; Kokka: Giden, Kanmu to Saichō to sono Jidai
- Height: 1.78 m (5 ft 10 in)

Ryūnosuke Kawai (河合 龍之介, Kawai Ryūnosuke, born 23 May 1983, in Fuchū, Tokyo, Japan) is a Japanese actor. He was represented by T-artist and Riche Management and later, in May 2016, became a freelancer.

Kawai graduated from Waseda Jitsugyo Gakko High School and Waseda University School of Social Sciences.

== Filmography ==
=== TV drama ===
Year	Title	Role	Network	Notes
2004	Koinu no Waltz	Student	NTV	Episode 2
2004	Aijō Ippon!	Ryuichi Murakami	NTV	Episode 8
2005	Pink no Idenshi	Morio Kinoshita	TV Tokyo	Episode 8
2006	Junjō kirari	Akira Wakatsuki	NHK	Episode 52
2006	Ultraman Mebius	Jun Susaki	CBC	Episode 28
2006	Aibō		TV Asahi	Season 5 Episode 10 and Season 9 Final Episode
2007	Otona no Megane: Go-maru-ni	Yutaka Kitajima	CTC	Quasi-lead role
2007	Delicious Gakuin	Toshiki Hijikata	TV Tokyo	
2007	Renai Shindan: Unmei no Kodou	Kei Katsuragi	TV Tokyo	
2007	Ai no Meikyū	Haruki Ayukawa	THK	
2008	Tadashii Ouji no Tsukuri Kata	Kyota Yamazaki	TV Tokyo	
2008	Wild Strawberry	Magician Kaneko	TV Asahi Channel	Episode 2
2008	Tomica Hero: Rescue Force	Yuto Fukuzawa	TVA	Episode 20
2009	Shitsuji Kissa ni Okaerinasaimase	Naruhane	MBS	
2009	Sono Otoko, Fuku Shochō	Tomokazu "Kimihiko Senzaki" Tsuji	TV Asahi	Series 3 Episode 3
2010	Tomica Hero: Rescue Fire	Kentaro	TV Tokyo	Episodes 40 to 42
2010	Kamen Rider W	Makoto Uesugi / Jewel Dopant	TV Asahi	Episodes 41 and 42
2010	Shin Keishichō Sōsaikka 9 Kakari	Ryutaro Koda	TV Asahi	2nd Series Episode 3
2011	Hitori janai	Kuroki	BS Fuji	Episode 3
2013	Cosmic Front: Tenmon Shōgun Tokugawa Yoshimune	Yoshimune no Sobashū	NHK	
2014	Naze Tōdō-in Seiya 16-sai wa Kanojo ga Dekinai no ka?	Takeda	NBN	Episodes 8 and 9
2015	The Last Witness	Miura	TV Asahi	
2016	Good-bye Debussy: Pianist Tantei Yosuke Misaki	Orthopedic surgeon	NTV	

=== Films ===
Year	Title	Role	Notes	Ref.
2006	The Prince of Tennis	Student		
2006	Death Note	College student		
2006	Yo-Yo Girl Cop	Classmate		
2007	Fuzoroina Himitsu	Yoji Yamaji		
2007	Itsuka no Kimi e	Kohei Hayase	Quasi-lead role	
2008	Yūbae Shōjo: Asakusa no Shimai	Aoyama		
2008	Saikyō Heiki Mesukōsei: Rika	Yuji		
2008	Topless	Kenta Kobayashi		
2008	Kizumomo	Ryo Satomi		
2009	Kirakira Movies: Shinjuku-ku Kabukichō Hoikuen	Susumu		
2009	18-rin	Sawakura-shachō		
2009	Sho no Michi	Tatsuhiko Ichihara		
2010	Tenohira no Shiawase	Kenichi Tanaka		
2010	Ai no Kotodama: Sekai no Hate made	Shinji Tamura		
2010	Love & Loathing & Lulu & Ayano	Takashi		
2010	Aisuru toki, Aisa reru toki	Ryuji Ishii		
2010	Zero Yon Fighter	Shinnosuke Kudo	Lead role	
2012	Real Onigokko 5	Sakuya Kawasaki		
2012	Jikū Keisatsu Wrecker Deadly Night Shade	Shinya Sawaguchi		
2012	Boku no Naka no Otoko no Musume	Noboru Nakamura		
2012	Zombideo	Courier man		
2013	Yoake Zen: Asayake-chū	Noriaki Matsumoto		
2014	Live	Yoshimaza Yamazaki		
2015	Irol Girl: Ultimate Weapon	Dongcheng "Kill" Tetsuya		
2015	Murder on D Street	Saburo Goda		
2016	Watcher in the Attic	Saburo Goda		

=== Short films ===
Year	Title	Role	Notes
2007	Hodōkyō no Umi	Umi	"Harbie Live Talk DVD Talking Face Vol. 1 ni Shūroku"

=== Music videos ===
Year	Title	Notes
2013	TVXQ "Scream"	As the escaping man

=== Documentaries ===
Year	Title	Network	Notes
2005	Sekai Ururun Taizai-ki	MBS	"Germany, Lert"

=== TV variety ===
Year	Title	Network
2016	Honoo-no Taiiku-kai TV	TBS

=== Advertisements ===
Title
NTT DoCoMo Tohoku
MannanLife
Paris Miki Holdings

=== Stage ===
Year	Title	Role	Notes
	Tenimyu	Waka Hiyoshi	
2005	The Imperial Match: Hyotei Gakuen		
2005	The Imperial Match: Hyotei Gakuen in winter 2005-2006		
2006	Dream Live 3rd		
2006	Slab Boys	Alan	
2006	Advancement Match: Rokkaku feat. Hyotei Gakuen		
2007	Kenshūi Damashī!	Kotaro Mizoguchi	
2007	Dream Live 4th		
2007	Adult na Onna-tachi	Takuya	Guest
2007	Taikan Kisetsu	Kusunohito Mishima	
2008	Psychic Detective Yakumo	Yakumo Saito	
2008	The Imperial Presence: Hyotei feat. Higa		
2009	Onna Nobunaga	Azai Nagamasa	
2010	Australia Makondō 1st Australia: San Gatsu no 5-kakan	Minobe	
2012	Space Travelers Side:summers		
2012	Cuckoo no Su no Ue de		Part of the A Cast; Otoko-tō Version
2013	Kokka: Giden, Kanmu to Saichō to sono Jidai	Emperor Kanmu	
2013	Liberus Produce Tokyo Girotin Club Daiichikai Kōen: Tokyo Kijin Hakurankai	Yamada-shōsa	
2013	Dharma	Dharma	Lead role
2013	Radio 311	Shunsuke Onodera (A Cast), Shinobu Ito (B Cast)	
2013	Neko to Inu to Yakusoku no To	Mitsu Koyano	Lead role
2013	Australia Makondō Shōwa Makondō Kunio Kishida Gensaku Collection 2: Chronic-Monoroge	Tatsuo Hideshima	Lead role
2013	Osaero	Asai	Part of the AB Group
2013	Saimatsu Meijizaru Fair Nenmatsuda yo! Minna Shūgō!!	Jiro Suruga	
2014	Anata to Sumunara	Tatsuya	Lead role
2014	Masshiro na Zumen to Time Machine	Miki Imagawa	
2014	Hanareushi	Takasugi Shinsaku	Lead role
2014	Sokkyō Shibai × Preview: potlock 2nd(night)		
2014	Bokura no Shinya Kōsoku	Konishi	
2015	Jidai ni Nagasa rero!	Novelist	
2015	Rōdoku-nō Theater: Kanyō Kyū	Shinbuyo	
2015	Taikan suru Nō: Kanyōkyū	Navigator	
2015	Makai Ren Tōkai: Makai Gōka	Daishuku Yasusha	
2015	Makai Ren Tōkai: Makai Aika	Takasugi Shinsaku	
2015	Makai Ren Tōkai: Makai Zanki	Emperor Sutoku	
2015	Makai Ren Tōkai: Makai Sōkoku	Emperor Sutoku	
2015	Makai Ren Tōkai: Makai Shinobu Hōjō	Emperor Sutoku	
2015	Makai Ren Tōkai: Makai Zetsumei	Emperor Sutoku	
2015	Ryunosuke Kawai Tandoku Live: Hito Mushi –Shin Yotsuya Kaidan Sono Ichi–		
2015	Ryunosuke Kawai Tandoku Live: Hito Mushi –Shin Yotsuya Kaidan Sono Ni–		
2015	Ryunosuke Kawai Tandoku Live: Hito Mushi –Shin Yotsuya Kaidan Sono San–		
2015	Ryunosuke Kawai Tandoku Live: Hito Mushi –Shin Yotsuya Kaidan Sono Shi–		
2015	Ryunosuke Kawai Tandoku Live: Hito Mushi –Shin Yotsuya Kaidan Sono Go–		
2015	Nansō Satomi Hakkenden	Inuyama Michibushi Tadashiazuka	Part of the Akaiwa Ikkaku Taketō
2015	Atchikyū to kotchikyū	Masahiro	
2016	Night on the Galactic Railroad		
2016	Sakebedomo Sakebedomo, kono Yoru no Gaite	Shippo	
2016	Australia Makondō: Gō	Orihara	
2016	Uchū ni Ame no Furugotoku	Cash trader	Video appearance
2016	"Straydog" Produce Kōen: Kanashiki Tenshi	Shigeru	
2016	Australia Makondō: Iki ga Kurushiku naru hodo ni Tobu		
2024	Kageki Shojo!!	Kozaburо̄ Shirakawa	

=== Internet series ===
Title	Website
A! Tōdoroku Hōsōkyoku	T-Time

=== DVD ===
Year	Title	Role	Notes
2006	Ki Saber Dai Ichi Fumi	Masaki Hinata	Lead role
2006	Ki Saber Dai Ni Fumi	Masaki Hinata	Lead role
2007	Harbie Live Talk DVD Talking Face Vol. 1		
2007	Ki Saber Dai San Fumi	Masaki Hinata	Lead role
2007	Ki Saber Dai Yon Fumi	Masaki Hinata	Lead role
2008	Blanca		
2009	Kirakira Actors TV		
2011	Kiss & Hug		

=== Photobooks ===
Year	Title
2006	Ryunosuke Kawai
2007	Ambitious

=== Others ===
Year	Title	Notes
	Visual Boy	Mobile site
2014	Chara Full Stars	Idol training simulation movie
