= This Is Love Psychedelico =

This is Love Psychedelico

Compilation album by Love Psychedelico
- Released: May 20, 2008
- Genre: Rock music
- Label: HackTone Records; Victor Records
- Producer: Love Psychedelico

Love Psychedelico chronology
Golden Grapefruit (2007)	This is Love Psychedelico (2008)

This is Love Psychedelico is Love Psychedelico's American debut album which was released on May 20, 2008. The official Japanese release album title is This is Love Psychedelico ~U.S. Best~, released on June 18, 2008.

== Overview ==
This album was announced for its release in the United States on April 23, 2008, on the official website along with the track listings. Many songs in the track listing are the same as songs featured on an earlier album Early Times released in 2005, however, the track listings on this American debut album only contains songs that were previously released as singles and albums and do not include new songs. Only the Japanese version contains the bonus tracks "dry town" and "Mind across the universe", nicknaming them "Bonus Tracks for Japan", however the bonus track "Mind across the universe" is available when purchasing the album through iTunes.

== Critical reception ==
In a review for OffBeat, Alex Rawls wrote that the album "dares you to sing along" with its catchy melodies.

== Track listing ==
All tracks are written by Love Psychedelico.

CD
No.	Title	Length
1.	"Standing Bird"
2.	"Your Song"
3.	"Everybody needs somebody"
4.	"Lady Madonna~Yūutsu naru Spider~(~憂鬱なるスパイダー~; ~The melancholy Spider~)"
5.	"fantastic world"
6.	"unchained"
7.	"My last fight"
8.	"Last Smile"
9.	"all over love"
10.	""O""
11.	"These days"
12.	"neverland"
13.	"A Day For You"
14.	"dry town"
15.	"Mind across the universe"
