= It's You (Love Psychedelico song) =

Single by Love Psychedelico
- A-side: "It's You"
- B-side: "Lay Down Sally"
- Released: August 10, 2011
- Genre: Folk, blues rock
- Length: 3:48
- Label: Victor Entertainment
- Songwriter(s): Love Psychedelico
- Producer(s): Love Psychedelico

Love Psychedelico singles chronology
| "Dry Town (Theme of Zero)/Shadow Behind" (2010) | "It's You" (2011) |

Alternative cover
- Cover artwork for the limited edition

"It's You" is the thirteenth single by Japanese rock duo Love Psychedelico. It was released on August 10, 2011.

== Background ==
"It's You"
A 28-second sample of first chorus of "It's You."

"It's You" is Love Psychedelico's first original single in five years, since "Aha! (All We Want)" (2006). The song was written for the second season of the Aya Ueto-led police procedural drama Zettai Reido, for which it serves as main theme. A cover of the Eric Clapton song "Lay Down Sally," was recorded for the single and included as a B-side. The limited edition of the single, titled "It's You: Zettai Reido Complete Edition" (It's You 〜絶対零度コンプリートエディション〜) includes both the title track and B-side, the first season's main theme, "Dry Town (Theme of Zero)," and "Shadow Behind," the opening theme for both seasons. "It's You" was digitally released in ringtone format on July 12, 2011, the premiere date of Zettai Reido: Tokushū Hanzai Sennyū Sōsa.

== Composition ==
In a press release, Kumi commented, "I am happy to have been asked to partake in this project once again. This time around we wrote the song after having talked about the concept and visuals of the show. It felt like a genuine collaboration. We recorded this song with a string orchestra, which is a little something different from us to look forward to." "From our talks with the producer, we determined that "hope" was the keyword for the concept of the drama [...] 'It's You' turned out to be a rooter's song not only for the drama's protagonist, but for all the people in Japan," added Naoki.

The show's producer, Hiroaki Narikawa, also issued a comment on their ongoing collaboration:

When the second season of Zettai Reido was confirmed, I knew I wanted Love Psychedelico to sing the main theme again. In the first season, the drama and the music worked together perfectly to create the world of Zettai Reido. This time, in order for the music and the drama to share an even deeper connection, I made sure to discuss the concept thoroughly with the two of them. Thus "It's You" was born. I'm really thankful to them for this song because it encloses a message of "hope," which is the theme of the series, and portrays the drama with accuracy and emotion.

== Chart performance ==
"It's You" debuted at number 26 on the Oricon Daily Singles Chart on August 9, 2011. It peaked at number 34 on the Oricon Weekly Singles chart with 3,120 copies sold in its first week. The single has charted for four weeks, selling 6,156 copies in total.

== Track listing ==
All tracks are written by Love Psychedelico, except track 2

| No. | Title | Writer(s) | Arranger(s) | Length |
|---|---|---|---|---|
| 1. | "It's You" | | Strings arranged by Jun Abe & Love Psychedelico | 3:48 |
| 2. | "Lay Down Sally" (cover version) | Eric Clapton, Marcy Levy, George Terry | Love Psychedelico | 3:58 |
| Total length: | | | | 7:49 |

Limited Edition CD
| No. | Title | {{{extra_column}}} | Length |
|---|---|---|---|
| 3. | "Dry Town (Theme of Zero)" | Strings arranged by Jun Abe & Love Psychedelico | 4:29 |
| 4. | "Shadow Behind" | | 4:12 |
| Total length: | | | 16:35 |

Limited Edition DVD
| No. | Title | Length |
|---|---|---|
| 1. | "It's You" (Music Video) |
| 2. | "Dry Town (Theme of Zero)/Shadow Behind (2 Songs Complete Version)" (Music Video) |
| 3. | "Dry Town (Theme of Zero)" (Music Video) |
| 4. | "Shadow Behind" (Music Video) |

== Charts ==
| Chart (2011) | Peak position |
|---|---|
| Billboard Japan Hot 100 | 7 |
| Billboard Japan Hot Top Airplay | 5 |
| Billboard Japan Adult Contemporary Airplay | 4 |
| Billboard Japan Hot Singles Sales | 28 |
| Oricon Daily Singles | 26 |
| Oricon Weekly Singles | 34 |
