= Gurozuka =

- DVD released by Synapse Films
- Directed by: Yoichi Nishiyama
- Screenplay by: Ao Murata
- Story by: Tadayoshi Kubo
- Produced by: Kenta Yagi; Ikki Katashima
- Starring: Yuko Ito; Keiko Saito; Yukari Fukui; Yoko Mitsuya; Nozomi Ando; Yuko Kurosawa; Chisato Morishita
- Cinematography: Norio Teranuma
- Music by: Ryuji Murayama
- Production company: Groduca Production Committee
- Distributed by: Synapse Films
- Release date: October 22, 2005 (Japan)
- Running time: 84 minutes
- Country: Japan
- Language: Japanese

Gurozuka (グロヅカ) is a 2005 slasher film directed by Yoichi Nishiyama, and written by Ao Murata and Tadayoshi Kubo.

== Plot ==
In Japan, a school's movie club was shut down when one member disappeared and another was hospitalized after suffering a nervous breakdown. Seven years later, two students, Maki and Ai, restart the club with the intention of making a horror film based on the events that led to the organization's closure. Three other girls (Natsuki, Yayoi, and Yuka) join the club, and they, Maki and Ai are taken to a secluded lodge called the Yuai House by Maki's sister Yoko, a teacher and former club member, who has brought along the awkward Takako.

Once everyone has set up at the Yuai House, Maki and Ai show the other girls an old 8mm tape Maki found while cleaning out the club room at the school. The video, titled Gurozuka, is set at the lodge, and depicts someone wearing a Noh mask killing their co-star with a meat cleaver. The students debate over whether the murder shown on the tape was real, and the next day the car fails to start, and all the food, cell phones, and wallets disappear, along with the Noh mask and cleaver that were going to be used in the film project.

When night falls, Natsuki disappears, and Takako and Yuka are non-fatally poisoned, prompting Yoko to leave in search of aid. In the morning, Ai looks over footage shot by Natsuki, which shows her being assaulted by someone wearing the Noh mask. Ai runs outside and finds Maki, who claims to have seen the masked woman just moments ago. The two then find all the missing food dumped in the woods, along with the Noh mask and now bloodied cleaver. The girls return to the house, and discover Takako and Yayoi are gone, so they go in search of them along with a recovered Yuka, soon stumbling onto the bodies of Natsuki and Yayoi. The trio returns to the lodge (where Takako has been hiding) and decide to hold out until the morning. A bloodied Yoko appears banging on the door, begging for help, moments before the Noh-masked figure breaks in.

Ai is chased outside by the killer, and finds Yuka's corpse, and a delusional and dying Takako. The murderer catches up to Ai, and pulls off the Deigan mask to reveal she is Maki. Maki explains that after finding the Gurozuka tape she became obsessed with it, and that it made her want to kill. Ai escapes, and Maki gives chase to her once again, after stabbing Yoko in the head. When Maki finds Ai, she professes her love for her, and then claims she is going to cannibalize her body to become her. Before Maki can make the killing blow, Ai stabs her in the chest with a nail the two had earlier found stuck in a tree.

Ai wakes up at the Yuai House, and joins Yoko (who she had found alive, and saved) in watching Gurozuka, which Yoko muses seems to drive people insane. When Ai tries to destroy the tape, Yoko grabs her, and repeats Maki's line "You're such a good girl. I want to be you, Ai."

== Cast ==
- Chisato Morishita as Ai
- Nozomi Ando as Takako
- Yukari Fukui as Yuka
- Yuko Ito as Yoko
- Yuko Kurosawa as Natsuki
- Yoko Mitsuya as Maki
- Keiko Saito as Yayoi

== DVD release ==
Gurozuka was released on DVD by Synapse Films on January 10, 2012. The disc's extras included a trailer, and a behind the scenes featurette.

== Reception ==
The film received mixed to negative reviews, the main criticisms against it being that it suffered from limp direction, and a dull plot. DVD Verdict wrote, "Gurozuka isn't exactly a bad film, but it doesn't light up the screen with excitement, either". Moria said, "Nishimiya's camera seems to be merely anonymously observing scenes with no interest in style or mood. In other words, what we have is a J-horror film that has been bled of all atmosphere. This also makes for a dull film – we end up waiting for over half the running time for something out of the ordinary to happen. Most of the time is taken up by the bitcheries between the six girls and petty debates over who stole the food and wallets." Justin Felix of DVD Talk said that the film is too boring for mainstream audiences and is suited more to enthusiasts of Japanese horror.
