= Sentimental Yasuko =

- Film poster for Sentimental Yasuko

Japanese name
- Kanji: センチメンタルヤスコ
Transcriptions
- Revised Hepburn: Senchimentaru Yasuko
- Directed by: Kei Horie
- Written by: Kei Horie
- Produced by: Kei Horie, Chikako Nakabayashi, Masahiro Yoshida
- Starring: Azusa Okamoto; Narushi Ikeda; Masato Wada; Kenichi Takito; Manpei Takagi; Miwako Wagatsuma; Tadashi Sakata; Takashi Nishina; Hajime Yamazaki
- Cinematography: Mitsuaki Fujimoto
- Distributed by: Le Himawari
- Release date: April 21, 2012
- Running time: 87 min
- Country: Japan
- Language: Japanese

Sentimental Yasuko (センチメンタルヤスコ, Senchimentaru Yasuko) is a 2012 Japanese mystery drama film directed by Kei Horie. The film is based on the 2006 Japanese play of the same name.

== Cast ==
- Azusa Okamoto as Yasuko Hata
- Narushi Ikeda as Detective Yamanaka
- Masato Wada as Satoshi Yuminaga
- Kenichi Takito as Junpei Tendo
- Manpei Takagi as Kazuki Komagata
- Miwako Wagatsuma as Akira Yokoyama
- Tadashi Sakata as Sokyu Akagi
- Takashi Nishina as Daikichi Kobayashi
- Hajime Yamazaki as Keisuke Ijima

== Production ==
The Sentimental Yasuko was the first theaterical production of Corcflases by Takahiro Horie released in 2006. The film adaptation was released in April 21, 2012. In an interview with Eiga.com, Horie reveals that some of the film's plot was based on his own experiences such as the divorcing of his parents when he was young and the Great East Japan Earthquake. He also revealed that he rewrote the story to be more "comedic".
