= Kei Horie =

Japanese creative (born 1978)

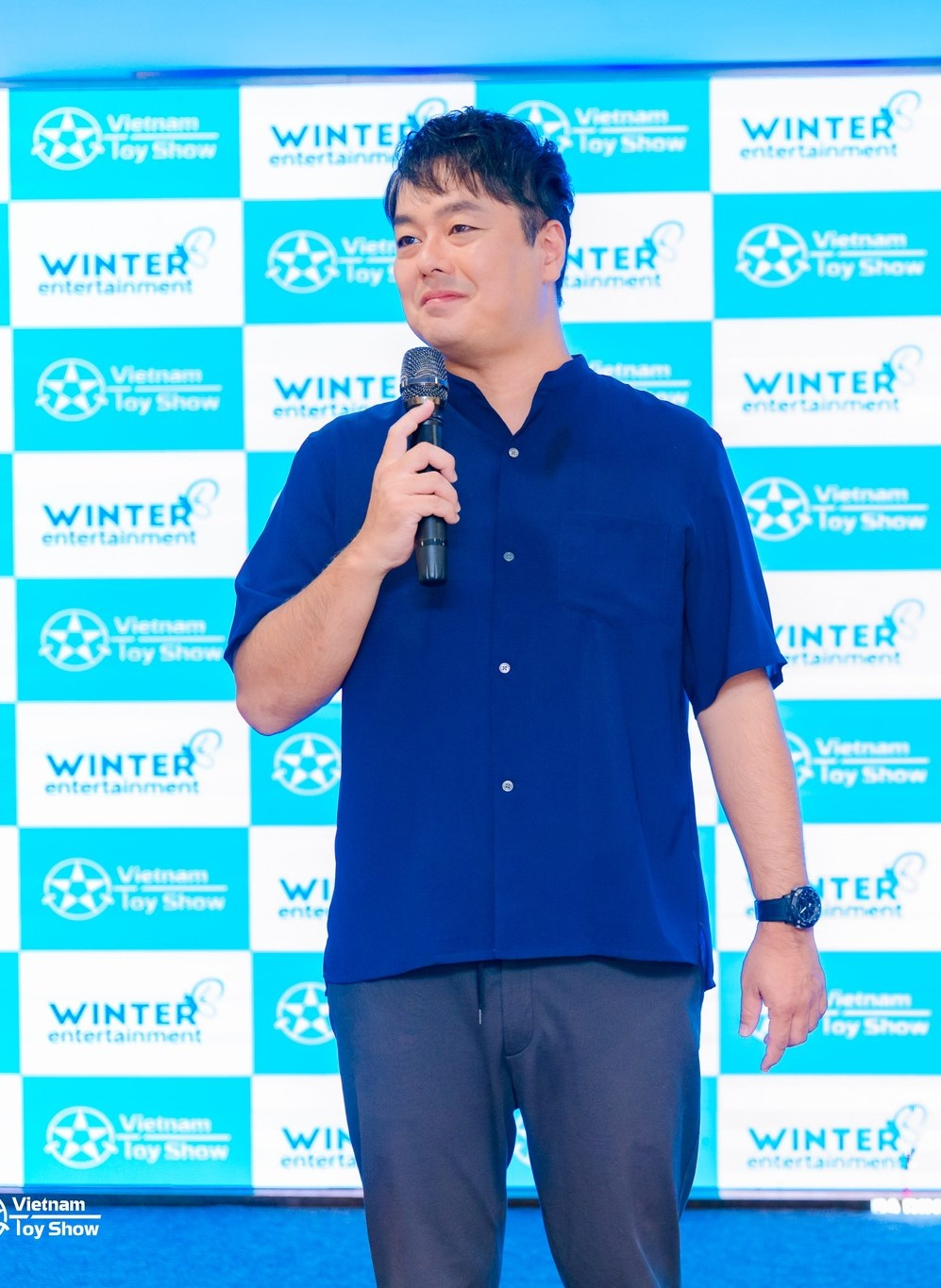
- Actor Horie Kei at the Vietnam Toy Show event
- Born: 4 October 1978 (age 47); Tokyo, Japan
- Occupations: Director, producer, editor, writer, actor
- Years active: 1997–present
- Children: 2
- Relatives: Kazuma Horie (brother)

Kei Horie (堀江 慶, Horie Kei; born 4 October 1978 in Tokyo, Japan) is a Japanese writer, film producer, director, editor and former actor. He is known as Gaku Washio/GaoYellow in 2001's Super Sentai's series, Hyakujuu Sentai GaoRanger. He reprised his role on one more occasion in the Super Sentai teamup, Hurricanger vs Gaoranger in 2003. His older brother, Kazuma Horie, is a voice actor.

== Filmography ==
=== Acting roles ===
- 2004 – Ai no Sorea a.k.a. The Stormy Waves of Love; as Kyoichi Ozaki
- 2003 – Jisatsu Manyuaru; a.k.a. Suicide Manual; as Police Detective Nishiyama
- 2003 – Ju-on: The Grudge 2; as Noritaka Yamashita
- 2001 – Hyakujuu Sentai Gaoranger; as Gaku Washio/GaoYellow
- 1999 – Gamera 3: Revenge of Iris; as Shigeki Hinohara
- 1998 – Tomei Shojo Air; as Ryota Kasugai

=== Stage shows ===
- 2021 – Kikai Sentai Zenkaiger vs. Hyakujuu Sentai Gaoranger, as Gaku Washio/GaoYellow

=== Directing ===
- 2001 – Glowing, Growing
- 2003 – Shibuya Kaidan (a.k.a. The Locker)
- 2004 – Veronica wa Shinu Koto ni Shita a.k.a. Veronica Decides to Die
- 2004 – Kisu to Kizu
- 2004 – Shibuya Kaidan 2 (a.k.a. The Locker 2)
- 2005 – Taga Kokoro Nimo Ryu wa Nemuru
- 2007 – Itsuka no Kimi e
- 2012 – Sentimental Yasuko
- 2013 – Ku no Kyoukai
- 2015 – Forget Me Not
- 2025 – Fake Out

=== Writing ===
- 2005 – Life on the Longboard

== Awards ==
=== 2002 Mannheim-Heidelberg International Filmfestival ===
- Won the Prize of the Ecumenical Jury - Special Mention of the movie, Glowing Growing for his radical analysis of the sensitive subject 'suicide of the young'. The uncompromising way the narration is offered encourages us to debate.

=== 2001 Vancouver International Film Festival ===
- Won the Dragons and Tigers Award (Special Mention) of the movie, Glowing Growing
- Nominated for the Dragons and Tigers Award of the movie, Glowing Growing
