= Naruhodo! The World =

Japanese television series

- Country of origin: Japan

Original release
- Network: Fuji TV
- Release: October 6, 1981 – March 26, 1996

Naruhodo! The World (なるほど!ザ・ワールド) is a travelogue and information quiz show that was broadcast from October 6, 1981, until March 26, 1996 on Fuji TV.

== Format ==
The show was hosted by Kinya Aikawa and Eriko Kusuta. The game would be played by eight celebrity contestants in teams of two. After an initial quiz, the teams would be ranked in order 1 to 4. Subsequent questions would be posed to the lowest team first; if they could not answer it, the next higher ranking team would have a shot. Correct answers enabled a team to rise in rank, and cause the next higher rank team to fall in rank. The team that finished in the number 1 position would win the game. Questions were posed by reporters in video-taped reports from exotic locations throughout the world, with the questions being about that location. The location reports could be events in themselves, with some from places like the Arctic, and were central to the show's success.

== Reception ==
Over a total of 723 episodes, the series averaged 21.4% in audience ratings. It garnered its top rating of 36.4% on 27 December 1983.

== Video game ==
A Super Famicom game based on the show was released in 1994 by Tomy. The cover art features Kinya Aikawa and Eriko Kusuta.

== See also ==
- Kakku
