= The Locker =

- Directed by: Kei Horie
- Written by: Osamu Fukutani
- Produced by: Yôichi Iwasa; Kengo Kaji; Issei Shibata
- Starring: Asami Mizukawa; Shūji Kashiwabara; Chisato Morishita; Mayuka Suzuki; Tomohisa Yuge; Fumina Hara; Maki Horikita; Kanji Tsuda; Joe Hyūga; Kei Horie; Amiko Kanaya
- Cinematography: Takahiro Hyakusoku
- Edited by: Kazushige Matsuda
- Music by: Tsukazaki Yohei
- Release date: 7 February 2004
- Running time: 71 min.
- Country: Japan
- Language: Japanese

The Locker (Japanese: 渋谷怪談, Hepburn: Shibuya kaidan) is a 2004 Japanese horror and thriller film directed by Kei Horie. The film stars Asami Mizukawa, Shūji Kashiwabara, Chisato Morishita, and Mayuka Suzuki in the lead roles.

== Cast ==
- Asami Mizukawa as Reika Yajima
- Shūji Kashiwabara
- Mayuka Suzuki
- Tomohisa Yuge
- Fumina Hara
- Maki Horikita as Ayano Kubo
- Kanji Tsuda
- Chisato Morishita
- Joe Hyūga
- Kei Horie
- Amiko Kanaya
