= Love Psychedelico =

Japanese rock band

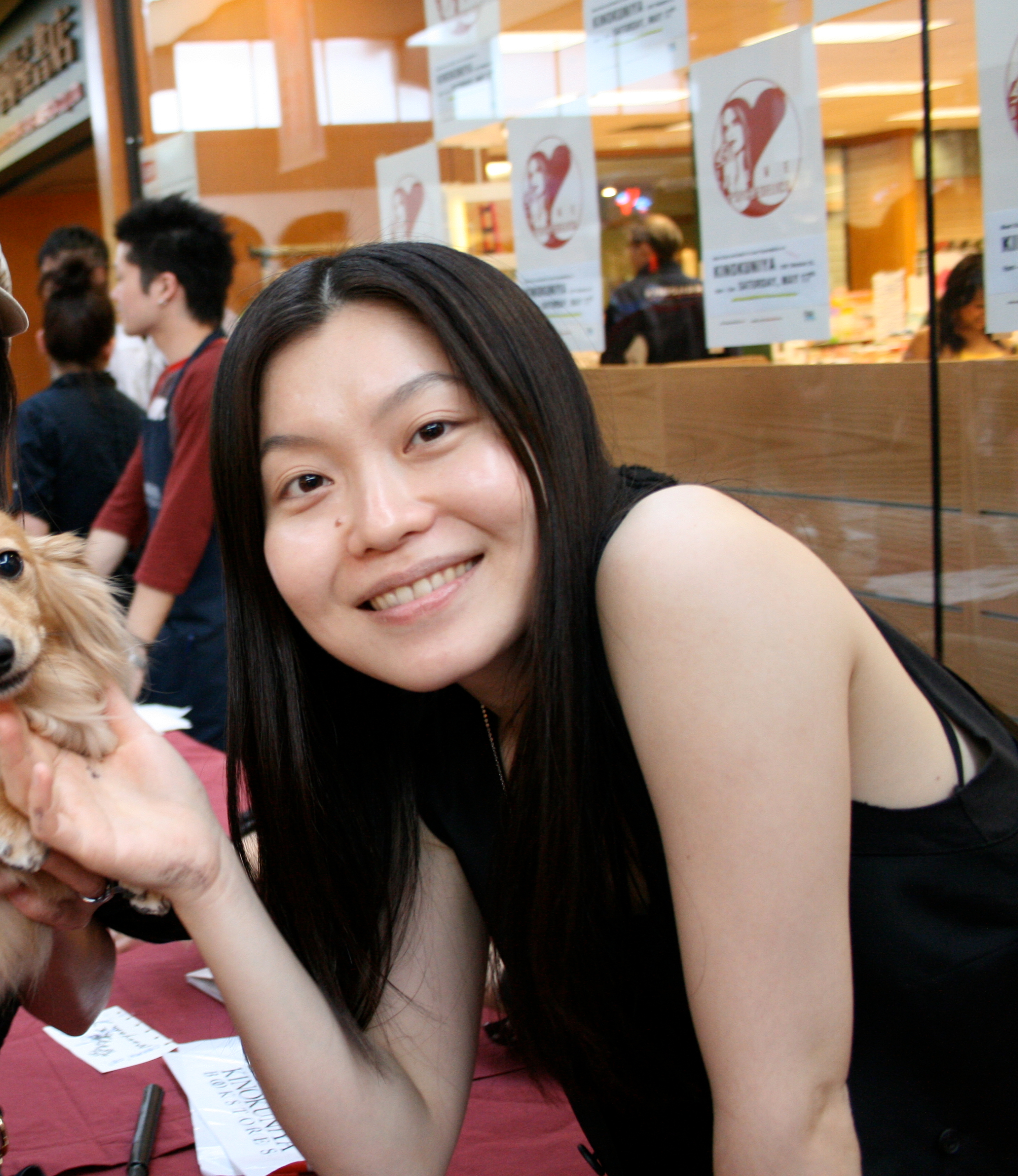
- Love Psychedelico vocalist Kumi, 2008

Background information
- Also known as: Delico
- Origin: Tokyo, Japan
- Genres: Psychedelic rock; pop rock; folk rock; blues rock
- Years active: 1997–present
- Labels: Victor, Hacktone
- Members: Kumi; Naoki
- Website: http://www.lovepsychedelico.net

Love Psychedelico (Japanese: ラブ・サイケデリコ, Hepburn: Rabu Saikederiko), sometimes abbreviated as Delico (デリコ, Deriko), is a Japanese rock duo formed in Tokyo in 1997. Consisting of vocalist and rhythm guitarist Kumi and lead guitarist Naoki, they have been signed to Victor Entertainment their entire career. Their first studio album, The Greatest Hits (2001), was a major success, debuting at number one and selling over two million copies. They are popular not only in Japan, but also in Hong Kong and Taiwan.

== History ==
Love Psychedelico was formed in January 1997 by vocalist Kumi and guitarist Naoki Sato, who met as members of the music club at Aoyama Gakuin University in Tokyo. Kumi stated that the two hit it off immediately as Naoki was the first person she had met that had the same passion for music as her. The group's original name was "Love Psychedelic Orchestra", but the third word was eventually dropped and its first letter added to the end of the second word. It went through several member lineups, with people coming and going, until Kumi and Naoki were the only two remaining. In 1997, a song they submitted to an FM radio station garnered the attention of various music executives, who began to offer them recording contracts in 1999.

Love Psychedelico signed with major record label Victor Entertainment and released "Lady Madonna (Yūutsu Naru Spider)" as their debut single on April 21, 2000. It is the first song that the duo ever wrote together. Their first album, The Greatest Hits, was released on January 11, 2001. Naoki explained that it was created as a demo to recruit more band members, but the label liked it and released it largely as it was. They only re-recorded the vocals and acoustic guitar. The album sold one million copies in three days, and went on to sell over two million. It won Best Rock Album of the Year at the 15th Japan Gold Disc Awards, while Love Psychedelico were also recipients of New Artist of the Year. The duo visited America that March when they headlined Japan Nite at South by Southwest. They also toured the club and bar circuit in the United States, garnering largely positive reactions. American cities the band has said to have enjoyed playing were Nashville, Austin, and Kumi's childhood home of San Francisco. Love Psychedelic Orchestra, their second album, followed a year later on January 9, 2002, and sold 800,000 copies. Love Psychedelico were nominated for Best Rock Video at the 2002 MTV Video Music Awards Japan.

The group's third album, Love Psychedelico III, was released on February 25, 2004 and later certified Double Platinum for sales of 500,000. It was the first album that the band produced themselves, and they have continued to self-produce all of their subsequent recordings. In November, they went on their first tour of Asia, with concerts in South Korea and Hong Kong. The following year saw the February 9, 2005 release of the duo's first compilation album, Early Times. It received a positive response in Taiwan, where they held a concert in June of that year.

Golden Grapefruit, their fourth studio album released on June 27, 2007, was the first recorded at the band's private studio of the same name. Love Psychedelico made their first televised music program appearance on Bokura no Ongaku to promote it. They were interviewed by their friend Yoko Ono for the show. In 2008, the compilation album This is Love Psychedelico was released in the United States on May 20 by HackTone Records. David Gorman, president of the label, wanted a contract with the band after hearing a record he got from an acquaintance in 2005. It was released in Japan on June 18. Love Psychedelico are featured on the song "Mood" from Curly Giraffe's 2009 self-cover album Thank You for Being a Friend.

The band released their fifth album Abbot Kinney on January 13, 2010. Named after Abbot Kinney Boulevard, where HackTone Records was located, it was created based on their experiences living on the West Coast of the United States for a few months in 2008, and inspired by West Coast rock and country music. They also wrote the August 2010 single "This Is Love" for the boy band SMAP. The duo's album In This Beautiful World was released on April 17, 2013. The album's tour saw American percussionist Lenny Castro as part of their backing band. The following year saw the first acoustic Love Psychedelico concert in Japan to only feature the duo of Kumi and Naoki. The group also covered "Hikari" for the 2014 Hikaru Utada tribute album Utada Hikaru no Uta. 2015 marked the 15th anniversary of Love Psychedelico's debut. They celebrated by releasing The Best I and The Best II compilation albums in February and holding an anniversary tour from May to July, where they were supported by Yukihiro Takahashi on drums. An Asian tour followed in November, which included a performance at the Clockenflap festival in Hong Kong and a one-man anniversary live in Taiwan.

Love Your Love, the band's seventh studio album, was released on July 5, 2017. 2019 saw Kumi and Naoki take their "Two of Us" acoustic performances as a duo on the road for the first time with a national tour. In 2020, Love Psychedelico celebrated their 20th anniversary with four releases, including the compilation album Complete Singles 2000–2019. A tour was also planned, but it was postponed until May 2021. They also provided Takuya Kimura with the song "My Life" for his 2020 album Go with the Flow. The band's first album in five years, A Revolution, was released on October 5, 2022. In 2024, they collaborated with Glim Spanky on the song "Ai ga Michiru Made" for their All the Greatest Dudes compilation album.

== Musical style ==
"It's You"
Love Psychedelico are known for seamlessly switching between Japanese and English lyrics, like those heard in "It's You" (2011).

Stylistically, Love Psychedelico's music is reminiscent of the British Invasion of the late 1960s. Both members have cited The Beatles and Led Zeppelin as influences, though the influence of American folk and blues is also present. Kumi has named Janis Joplin and Sheryl Crow as influences, while Sato likes Bob Dylan. When writing songs, Naoki first brings the guitar riffs and the duo imagine the groove and beat and "just keep jamming until we feel, 'this is it'." Naoki explained, "In the 60's, rock n' roll music was dance music, or that's my understanding. It's important that the music makes the body move, so in order to get the groove going, we just keep jamming." Kumi said that they work on one song at a time, and although she has an idea of what she wants the album to look like as a whole, people are not required to listen to their albums in their entirety. They sometimes have song titles that are similar to already famous songs, such as "Lady Madonna" and "Your Song". The duo have described this as a coincidence that "just happens". Love Psychedelico have self-produced all of their recordings since 2004's Love Psychedelico III. Almost all of their material is recorded at their own private studio, Golden Grapefruit Recording Studio.

An identifiable trait of Love Psychedelico's music is their mix of Japanese and English lyrics and Kumi's pronunciation of them. While mixing the two languages is common in popular Japanese music, Kumi's singing is marked not only by fluent English pronunciation, but also an English-inflected pronunciation of Japanese. (Her spoken Japanese does not display the same affectations.) According to Andrew Moody, this pronunciation makes the group's songs difficult to reproduce in karaoke performances in contrast to bands such as Superfly, who have a similar stylistic approach but without the English-affected Japanese. Additionally, Kanara Ty wrote that Love Psychedelico's English proficiency allows them to produce "well-thought out lyrics" in the language, which sets them apart from the other Japanese artists who use English without having such a command of it. Kumi has said that most of her thoughts come to her in both languages, and that she and Naoki write lyrics together by gathering them from the sound of each song.

== Members ==
- Kumi (Born April 11, 1976, in Chiba Prefecture) – lead vocals, guitars, etc.
  - Kumi speaks English because she lived in San Francisco, California between the ages of two and seven. She was married to a non-celebrity man from March 9, 2010, until getting divorced in 2015. In 2018, she married musician Motoaki Fukunuma, who had been working as a support member for Love Psychedelico. The couple formed the band Uniolla in 2021 with Koji Hayashi (Triceratops) and Hideaki Iwanaka (Barbars, I Love You Orchestra, Brainchild's).
- Naoki (Born July 21, 1973, in Shizuoka Prefecture) – guitars, bass, backing vocals, etc.
  - Naoki was credited by his full name, Naoki Sato (佐藤直樹), in their early works. He produces The Bawdies.

=== Backing band ===
Current support members

- Nobumasa Yamada (Amp'box Recording Studio): recording engineer, drums (2004–present)
- Kiyoshi Takakuwa (Curly Giraffe, ex-Great3): bass (2004–present)
- Satoshi Bandoh (T-Square): drums (2015–present)
- Motoaki Fukanuma (Plagues, Mellowhead, Gheee): guitar (2017–present)
- Masahiko Tomita: drums (2017–present)
- Keiji Matsumoto (ex:T-Square): keyboards (2017–present)
- Masao Fukunaga: percussion (2017–present)

Former support members

- Hirohisa Horie (Neil & Iraiza): keyboards, guitar (2004–2015)
- Kenichi Shirane (Great3): drums (2004–2015)
- Tomohiko Gondo (Metafive): programming (2004–2015)
- Ryosuke Nagaoka (Tokyo Jihen): guitar (2015)
- Hiroki Chiba (Kinetic, Rabbitoo): bass (2015)

== Discography ==
=== Studio albums ===
Year	Album information	Oricon Albums Chart peak	Sales	Certifications
2001	The Greatest Hits: Released: January 11, 2001; Label: Victor (VICL-60666); Formats: CD, LP, digital download	1	2,000,000	*RIAJ: Quadruple Platinum
2002	Love Psychedelic Orchestra: Released: January 9, 2002; Label: Victor (VICL-60888); Formats: CD, LP, digital download	1	800,000	*RIAJ: Double Platinum
2004	Love Psychedelico III: Released: February 25, 2004; Label: Victor (VICL-61290); Formats: CD, LP, digital download	2	500,000	*RIAJ: Double Platinum
2007	Golden Grapefruit: Released: June 27, 2007; Label: Victor (VICL-62431); Formats: CD, LP, digital download	5	200,000	*RIAJ: Gold
2010	Abbot Kinney: Released: January 13, 2010; Label: Victor (VICL-63480); Formats: CD, LP, digital download	7	67,000	—
2013	In This Beautiful World: Released: April 17, 2013; Label: Victor (VICL-64007); Formats: CD, LP, digital download	5	—	—
2017	Love Your Love: Released: July 5, 2017; Label: Victor (VICL-64802); Formats: CD, 2CD, digital download	10	—	—
2022	A Revolution: Released: October 5, 2022; Label: Victor (VICL-65727); Formats: CD, CD+7-vinyl, digital download	20	—	—

=== Other albums ===
Year	Album information	Oricon Albums Chart peak	Sales	Certifications
2005	Early Times: Compilation album; Released: February 9, 2005; Label: Victor (VICL-61579); Formats: CD, digital download	1	500,000	*RIAJ: Double Platinum
2006	Live Psychedelico: Live album; Released: March 22, 2005; Label: Victor (VICL-61883); Formats: CD, digital download	35	14,000	—
2008	This Is Love Psychedelico: Compilation album for U.S. market; Released: May 20, 2008; Label: Victor (VICL-62840); Formats: CD, digital download	16	27,000	—
2010	Remasters Box: Compilation box set; Released: June 9, 2010; Label: Victor (VIZL-430); Formats: 5CD	139	700	—
2015	The Best I: Compilation album; Released: February 18, 2015; Label: Victor (VICL-64273); Formats: CD	8	—	—
2015	The Best II: Compilation album; Released: February 18, 2015; Label: Victor (VICL-64274); Formats: CD	9	—	—
2015	The Best Special Box: Compilation box set; Released: February 18, 2015; Label: Victor (VIZL-795); Formats: 3CD	—	—	—
2015	15th Anniversary Tour -The Best- Live: Live album; Released: December 23, 2015; Label: Victor (VIZL-892); Formats: 2CD and 2CD+Blu-ray	—	—	—
2018	Live Tour 2017 Love Your Love at the Nakano Sun Plaza: Live album; Released: May 9, 2018; Label: Victor (VIZL-1349); Formats: 2CD and 2CD+Bonus disc	—	—	—
2020	Complete Singles 2000–2019: Compilation album; Released: March 25, 2020; Label: Victor (VICL-65323〜6); Formats: 4CD	47	—	—
2022	20th Anniversary Tour 2021 Live at Line Cube Shibuya: Live album; Released: March 30, 2022; Label: Victor (VICL-65667/8); Formats: 2CD	—	—	—
2023	Live Tour 2022 "A Revolution" at Showa Women's University Hitomi Memorial Hall: Live album; Released: March 29, 2023; Label: Victor (VICL-65790); Formats: 2CD	—	—	—
2026	Love Psychedelico Naked Songs: Remix album; Released: April 21, 2026; Label: Victor (VICL-66126); Formats: CD	23	1,978	—

=== Singles ===
Year	Title	Notes	Oricon Singles Chart peak	Sales	Certifications	Album
2000	"Lady Madonna (Yūutsu Naru Spider)" (LADY MADONNA 〜憂鬱なるスパイダー〜; "Depressed Spider")	A different recording of the song was previously released independently at Tower Records stores in January 2000.	88	19,000		The Greatest Hits
2000	"Your Song"		17	140,000	—	The Greatest Hits
2000	"Last Smile"		11	270,000	RIAJ: Gold	The Greatest Hits
2001	"Free World"		5	200,000	RIAJ: Gold	Love Psychedelico Orchestra
2001	"I Will Be with You"		10	62,000	—	Love Psychedelico Orchestra
2002	"Hadaka no Ōsama" (裸の王様; "Naked King")		14	24,000	—	Love Psychedelico III
2003	"I Am Waiting for You"		26	14,000	—	Love Psychedelico III
2003	"My Last Fight"		12	100,000	RIAJ: Gold	Love Psychedelico III
2004	"Fantastic World"		30	9,000	—	—
2005	"Right Now"		28	11,000	—	—
2006	"Aha! (All We Want)"		25	10,000	—	Golden Grapefruit
2010	"Dry Town (Theme of Zero)/Shadow Behind"	Re-cut single	37	6,000	—	In This Beautiful World ("Dry Town (Theme of Zero)"); Abbot Kinney ("Shadow Behind")
2011	"It's You"		34	—	—	In This Beautiful World
2012	"Beautiful World/Happy Xmas (War Is Over)"		33	—	—	In This Beautiful World
2014	"Good Times, Bad Times"	Digital-only single	—	—	—	Love Your Love
2015	"Love Is All Around"	Digital-only single	—	—	—	Love Your Love
2015	"Merry Xmas to You"	Digital-only single; a Christmas "jingle" recorded as part of a 2015 collaboration campaign with the Shibuya Mark City shopping center. The only lyrics in the song are its title.	—	—	—	—
2016	"This Moment/C'mon, It's My Life"	Digital-only single; "This Moment" was used in a commercial campaign in April 2016 for JACCS Co, Ltd.. "C'mon, It's My Life" was used in a commercial campaign in March 2016 for Goodyear Tires.	—	—	—	Love Your Love
2018	"Sally"	Digital-only single	—	—	—	A Revolution
2020	"Swingin'"	Digital-only single	—	—	—	A Revolution
2022	"It's Not Too Late"	Digital-only single	—	—	—	A Revolution
2022	"A Revolution"	Digital-only single	—	—	—	A Revolution
2023	"All the Best to You"	Digital-only single	—	—	—	—

=== Home videos ===
- The Film 1999.12–2002.05 (November 21, 2002)
- In Concert at Budokan (December 7, 2005)
- Golden Grapefruit Box (June 18, 2008)
- Love Psychedelico Live Tour 2017 Love Your Love at the Nakano Sun Plaza (May 9, 2018)
- "Two of Us" Acoustic Session at Recording at Victor Studio 302 (May 26, 2019)
- Premium Acoustic Live "Two of Us" Tour 2019 at EX Theater Roppongi (March 25, 2020)
- Live the Greatest Hits 2020 (May 15, 2021)
- 20th Anniversary Tour 2021 Live at Line Cube Shibuya (March 30, 2022)
- Live Tour 2022 "A Revolution" at Showa Women's University Hitomi Memorial Hall (March 29, 2023)
