= Mei-chan no Shitsuji =

Japanese manga series

- Cover of the first volume of manga.

メイちゃんの執事
- Manga
- Written by: Riko Miyagi
- Published by: Shueisha
- Magazine: Margaret
- Original run: November 21, 2006 – January 25, 2013
- Volumes: 20
- Manga

Mei-chan no Shitsuji DX
- Written by: Riko Miyagi
- Published by: Shueisha
- Magazine: Margaret
- Original run: September 5, 2014 – June 5, 2023
- Volumes: 20
- Television drama
- Directed by: Junichi Ishikawa; Takao Kinoshita; Hidenori Jōhō; Kazuyuki Iwata
- Produced by: Fumi Hashimoto
- Written by: Kazunao Furuya
- Music by: Shin Kono; Yū Takami
- Studio: Fuji TV; Kyodo Television
- Original network: Fuji TV
- Original run: January 13, 2009 – March 17, 2009
- Episodes: 10

Mei-chan no Shitsuji (メイちゃんの執事; "Mei-chan's Butler") is a Japanese manga series written and illustrated by Riko Miyagi. The manga was serialized in Shueisha's Margaret magazine. The manga is licensed and published in Chinese in Taiwan by Tong Li Publishing. The manga has been adapted into a live-action Japanese television drama, which was broadcast on Fuji TV between January 13 and March 17, 2009.

== Media ==
=== Manga ===
Mei-chan no Shitsuji is written and illustrated by Riko Miyagi. The manga is serialised in Shueisha's Margaret magazine. The individual chapters have been collected into 20 tankōbon by Shueisha. The series ended on January 25, 2013, and was followed by a sequel called Mei-chan no Shitsuji DX in 2014. The sequel ended on June 5, 2023.

The manga is licensed and published in Taiwan by Tong Li Publishing.

=== Drama ===
The manga has been adapted into a live-action Japanese television drama, which was broadcast on Fuji TV between January 13 and March 17, 2009. The Region 2 DVD Box set for the series was released on June 17, 2009.

==== Cast ====
Group	Cast	Role	Note
Lead Role	''Nana Eikura''	Mei Shinonome	Hongo's successor
Lead Role	Hiro Mizushima	Rihito Shibata	Butler, Older brother
Lead Role	Takeru Sato	Kento Shibata	Butler's Apprentice, Younger brother
Lead Role	''Yu Yamada'': Rio Sasaki	Lucia (Shiori Hongo): young Shiori Hongo	Hongo's foster granddaughter, Hongo's successor
Lead Role	Osamu Mukai	Shinobu	Butler
St. Lucia Girl's Academy	''Keiko Horiuchi''	Sister Rose	Principal
St. Lucia Girl's Academy	Kosuke Suzuki	Sakuraba	Principal's Butler
St. Lucia Girl's Academy	''Mitsuki Tanimura''	Tami Yamada	Master
St. Lucia Girl's Academy	Shinnosuke Abe	Kanda	Butler
St. Lucia Girl's Academy	''Mayuko Iwasa''	Izumi Ryuonji	Master, Class President
St. Lucia Girl's Academy	Jutta Yuki	Kiba	Butler
St. Lucia Girl's Academy	''Aya Omasa''	Rika Kayama	Master
St. Lucia Girl's Academy	Akihiro Mayama	Aoyama	Butler
St. Lucia Girl's Academy	''Aoi Nakabeppu''	Fujiko Natsume	Master
St. Lucia Girl's Academy	Nobuo Kyo	Nezu	Butler
St. Lucia Girl's Academy	''Riko Yoshida''	Miruku Mamahara	Master
St. Lucia Girl's Academy	Ryohei Suzuki	Daimon	Butler
St. Lucia Girl's Academy	''Shiori Kutsuna''	Rin Amo	Master
St. Lucia Girl's Academy	Tomomi Maruyama	Yotsuya	Butler
Sun (Sole) Rank	Usuda Asami	Daichi Yuma	
Sun (Sole) Rank	Chiaki Horan	Satomi Mizusawa	
Sun (Sole) Rank	Ayano Yamamoto	Eriko Hino	
Sun (Sole) Rank	Ishibashi Natsumi	Kazama Ai	
Hongo's Family	Masahiko Tsugawa	Kintaro Hongo	Grandfather of Mei and Shiori, Chairman
Hongo's Family	Manpei Takagi	Ukon Akabane	Assistant
Hongo's Family	Shinpei Takagi	Sakon Akabane	Assistant
Hongo's Family	Jun Hashizume	Shutaro	Mei's father
Hongo's Family	Yorie Yamashita	Yu	Mei's mother
Nakamoto's Family	Nanase Hoshii	Natsumi Nakamoto	Younger sister
Nakamoto's Family	Hiromi Kitagawa	Mifuyu Nakamoto	Older sister
Nakamoto's Family	Mako Ishino	Akiko Nakamoto	Mother
Nakamoto's Family	Tetta Sugimoto	Shunpei Nakamoto	Father
Others	Kaori Yamaguchi	Miwako Ryuonji	Izumi's mother
Others	Yu Kamio	an agent	Episode 5

== Awards ==
Year	Award	Category	Recipient
2009	60th Television Drama Academy Awards	Best Drama	
2009	60th Television Drama Academy Awards	Best Supporting Actor	Takeru Sato
2010	Élan d'Or Award	Newcomer of the Year	Nana Eikura

== Reception ==
The Mei-chan no Shitsuji series was ranked 6th best selling manga series in Japan in the first half of 2009 with an estimated 2,580,155 copies sold between November 17, 2008, to May 17, 2009. The first volume of Mei-chan no Shitsuji was ranked the 36th best selling manga in Japan in the first half of 2009 with 334,536 copies sold from November 17, 2008, to May 17, 2009. The Mei-chan no Shitsuji series was ranked 7th best-selling manga series in 2009 with 3,076,659 copies sold. The first volume was ranked 12th on the Tohan charts between January 13 and 19, 2009. It was ranked 12th again between January 27 and February 2, 2009, and was ranked 10th between February 10 and 16, 2009. The second volume was ranked 13th between January 13 and 19, 2009. The third volume was ranked 19th. The fourth volume was ranked 37th. The fifth volume was ranked 24th. The sixth volume was ranked 25th. The seventh volume was ranked 23rd and 30th. The ninth volume was ranked 1st, 5th and 16th. The tenth volume was ranked 2nd, 14th and 30th.

All 10 episodes of Mei-chan no Shitsuji drama have been listed on the Japanese Anime TV rankings. The DVD box for the drama series was ranked the second best selling DVD between June 8–14, 2009, with 11,170 copies sold. Mei-chan no Shitsuji was awarded two prizes at the 60th Japanese Drama Academy Awards on April 22, 2009. Mei-chan no Shitsuji was awarded best drama and Takeru Satoh was awarded best supporting actor.
