= Shinpei Takagi (actor, born 1985) =

Japanese actor

Takagi Shinpei
- 高木 心平
- Born: October 22, 1985 (age 40); Seto, Aichi, Japan
- Education: Nagoya University
- Occupation: Actor
- Years active: 2006–2017
- Agent: Stardust Promotion
- Relatives: Manpei Takagi (brother)

Shinpei Takagi (高木 心平, Takagi Shinpei; born October 22, 1985) is a Japanese former actor from Seto, Aichi. He is the twin brother of actor Manpei Takagi; both are affiliated with Stardust Promotion.

== Filmography ==
=== TV drama ===
- Juken Sentai Gekiranger as Fake Retsu (2007; episode 38)
- Mei-chan no Shitsuji as Akabane Sakon (2009)
- Drifting Net Cafe (2009)
- Meitantei no Okite as Okawara in highschool (ep9) (2009)
- Ninkyō Helper as Koga Kosuke (2009)
- Indigo no Yoru (2010)
- Ouran High School Host Club as Hitachiin Hikaru (2011)
- Shirato Osamu no Jikenbo (2012)
- Unofficial Sentai Akibaranger as Takuma Tsuzuki/New Akiba Red (2012; episodes 10–11)

=== Stage ===
- The Prince of Tennis Musical (2006-2007)
- Kazegatsu yoku Fuiteiru (2009)

=== Film ===
- Arena Romance (2007)
- Ouran High School Host Club as Hitachiin Hikaru (2012)

=== Anime ===
- Yu-Gi-Oh! Arc-V - Yugo
