= The Dinner Table Detective =

Japanese novel series

- First novel volume cover, featuring (from top to bottom) Kageyama, Reiko Hosho, and Kyoichiro Kazamatsuri

謎解きはディナーのあとで (Nazotoki wa Dinā no Ato de)
- Genre: Mystery
- Novel series
- Written by: Tokuya Higashigawa
- Illustrated by: Yūsuke Nakamura
- Published by: Shogakukan
- Original run: September 2, 2010 – December 12, 2012
- Volumes: 3
- Manga
- Written by: Tokuya Higashigawa
- Illustrated by: Aya Kawase
- Published by: Shogakukan
- Imprint: Flowers Comics α
- Magazine: Petit Comic
- Original run: April 8, 2011 – November 10, 2011
- Volumes: 2
- Novel series

Shin Nazotoki wa Dinner no Ato de
- Written by: Tokuya Higashigawa
- Illustrated by: Yūsuke Nakamura
- Published by: Shogakukan
- Original run: March 31, 2021 – September 18, 2024
- Volumes: 2
- Anime television series
- Directed by: Mitsuyuki Masuhara
- Written by: Mariko Kunisawa
- Music by: Takeshi Hama
- Studio: Madhouse
- Licensed by: Amazon Prime Video
- Original network: FNS (Fuji TV)
- Original run: April 4, 2025 – June 20, 2025
- Episodes: 12 (15 segments)
- Television drama
- The Dinner Table Detective (2011)
- icon

The Dinner Table Detective (謎解きはディナーのあとで, Nazotoki wa Dinā no Ato de; lit. 'The After-Dinner Mysteries') is a Japanese mystery novel series written by Tokuya Higashigawa and illustrated by Yūsuke Nakamura. Shogakukan have published three volumes from September 2010 to December 2012. A manga adaptation illustrated by Aya Kawase was serialized in Shogakukan's josei manga magazine Petit Comic from April to November 2011, with its chapters collected into two tankōbon volumes. A sequel novel series by the same author and illustrator, titled Shin Nazotoki wa Dinner no Ato de, was published by Shogakukan in two volumes from March 2021 to September 2024.

A 10-episode television drama adaptation aired from October to December 2011 on Fuji TV and its affiliates. An anime television series adaptation produced by Madhouse aired from April to June 2025 on the same television network's Noitamina programming block.

== Plot ==
Reiko Hosho, a wealthy heiress of the Hosho Group, secretly works as a rookie detective for the Kunitachi Police Department under Inspector Kyoichiro Kazamatsuri, who himself is the heir of Kazamatsuri Motors. At home, Reiko wears an elegant dress while she eats dinner. Whenever she seeks advice from her butler Kageyama concerning a difficult case, he questions her inability to solve mysteries before he proceeds to figure it out for her.

== Characters ==
Reiko Hosho (宝生 麗子, Hōshō Reiko)
Voiced by: Kana Hanazawa (Japanese); Celeste Loots, Nicole Malcomson (young) (English)
Kageyama (影山)
Voiced by: Yuki Kaji (Japanese); Jock Kleynhans (English)
Kyoichiro Kazamatsuri (風祭 京一郎, Kazamatsuri Kyōichirō)
Voiced by: Mamoru Miyano (Japanese); Conradie van Heerden (English)
Kuninyan (くにニャン)
Voiced by: Yui Horie (Japanese); Nicole Malcomson (English)
Yaho Ranger Red (やほレンジャーレッド, Yaho Renjā Reddo)
Voiced by: Satoshi Nakao (Japanese); Luke Bollman (English)
Yaho Ranger Blue (やほレンジャーブルー, Yaho Renjā Burū)
Voiced by: Taichi Takeda (Japanese); Rob Coutts (English)
Yaho Ranger Yellow (やほレンジャーイエロー, Yaho Renjā Ierō)
Voiced by: Kōsuke Echigoya (Japanese); Gavin Gomes (English)

== Media ==
=== Novels ===
==== Volumes ====
===== The Dinner Table Detective =====
No.	Release date	ISBN
1	September 2, 2010	978-4-09-386280-6
2	November 10, 2011	978-4-09-386316-2
3	December 12, 2012	978-4-09-386347-6

===== Shin Nazotoki wa Dinner no Ato de =====
No.	Release date	ISBN
1	March 31, 2021	978-4-09-386608-8
2	September 18, 2024	978-4-09-386735-1

=== Manga ===
==== Volumes ====
No.	Release date	ISBN
1	November 10, 2011	978-4-09-134168-6
2	August 9, 2012	978-4-09-134609-4

=== Drama ===
In 2011, a drama aired on Fuji TV, protagonized by Sho Sakurai as butler Kageyama and Keiko Kitagawa as his heiress–turned–detective employer Reiko Hosho. Koda Kumi and Arashi sing the opening and main theme songs, respectively. In 2012, the drama was followed by a special and movie.

=== Stage play ===
A stage play adaptation ran at The Galaxy Theatre in Tokyo from August 31 to September 9, 2012. It starred Daigo as Kageyama, Maki Nishiyama as Reiko, and Eiji Wentz as Kazamatsuri.

A musical adaptation was announced in June 2025, which ran at the Nippon Seinenkan in Tokyo from September 9 to September 23, 2025, and at the Sky Theater MBS in Osaka from September 27 to October 1 of the same year. It starred Tatsuya Ueda as Kageyama, Shiori Tamai as Reiko, and Ryosuke Hashimoto as Kazamatsuri.

=== Anime ===
An anime television series adaptation was announced on November 25, 2024. It was produced by Madhouse and directed by Mitsuyuki Masuhara, with series composition by Mariko Kunisawa (with Masuhara co-writing Episodes 5B and 6), original character designs by Oreco Tachibana, animation character designs by Izumi Kawada and music composed by Takeshi Hama. The series aired from April 4 to June 20, 2025, on the Noitamina programming block on all FNS affiliates, including Fuji TV. The opening theme song is "Montage", composed by Hiroyuki Sawano and performed by Kento Nakajima, while the ending theme song is "Rhapsody", performed by Billy Boo. Amazon Prime Video is streaming the series worldwide.

==== Episodes ====
No.	Title	Directed by (Note: Production staff information is taken from the ending credits of each episode.)	Storyboarded by	Animation directed by	Original release date
1	"Welcome to the murderous party File 1"; Transliteration: "Satsui no Pāti ni Yōkoso File 1" (Japanese: 殺意のパーティにようこそ File 1)	Masaki Matsumura	Mitsuyuki Masuhara	Masaki Hinata; Izumi Kawada (chief)	April 4, 2025
2	"Welcome to the murderous party File 2"; Transliteration: "Satsui no Pāti ni Yōkoso File 2" (Japanese: 殺意のパーティにようこそ File 2)	Masaki Matsumura	Mitsuyuki Masuhara	Soonyoung Seo, Han Eun-mi, Bongdeok Kim & Jinyoung Jeong; Izumi Kawada & Takashi Muratani (chief)	April 11, 2025
2	"Here's a message from the dead File 1"; Transliteration: "Shisha Kara no Dengon o Dōzo File 1" (Japanese: 死者からの伝言をどうぞ File 1)	Tohru Ishida & Park Sihoo	Kenichi Shimizu	Soonyoung Seo, Han Eun-mi, Bongdeok Kim & Jinyoung Jeong; Izumi Kawada & Takashi Muratani (chief)	April 11, 2025
3	"Here's a message from the dead File 2"; Transliteration: "Shisha Kara no Dengon o Dōzo File 2" (Japanese: 死者からの伝言をどうぞ File 2)	Tohru Ishida, Yang Jeong-hee & Soonyoung Seo	Kenichi Shimizu	Han Eun-mi, Song Hyeon-ju, Mubon Hyung-jun, Jeong Ji-moon & Ha Yeon Jeong; Izumi Kawada & Takashi Muratani (chief)	April 18, 2025
4	"Please be aware of two-timing affairs File 1"; Transliteration: "Futamata ni wa o-ki o tsuke kudasai File 1" (Japanese: 二股にはお気をつけください File 1)	Yuuki Morishita	Yuuki Morishita & Aiko Wakatsuki	Yoshiko Shimizu, Nana Yamaguchi & Mayu Murakata; Izumi Kawada (chief)	April 25, 2025
5	"Please be aware of two-timing affairs File 2"; Transliteration: "Futamata ni wa o-ki o tsuke kudasai File 2" (Japanese: 二股にはお気をつけください File 2)	Yuuki Morishita	Yuuki Morishita & Aiko Wakatsuki	Airi Takahashi, Yoshiko Shimizu & Kim Jong Nam; Izumi Kawada (chief)	May 2, 2025
5	"The person who dropped it is a VTuber File 1"; Transliteration: "Otoshinushi wa Vtuber de Gozaimasu File 1" (Japanese: 落とし主はVtuberでございます File 1)	Mitsuyuki Masuhara	Mitsuyuki Masuhara	Airi Takahashi, Yoshiko Shimizu & Kim Jong Nam; Izumi Kawada (chief)	May 2, 2025
6	"The person who dropped it is a VTuber File 2"; Transliteration: "Otoshinushi wa Vtuber de Gozaimasu File 2" (Japanese: 落とし主はVtuberでございます File 2)	Mitsuyuki Masuhara	Mitsuyuki Masuhara	Masaki Hinata; Izumi Kawada (chief)	May 9, 2025
7	"There is no such thing as a completely locked room File 1"; Transliteration: "Kanzen na Misshitsu Nado Gozaimasen File 1" (Japanese: 完全な密室などございません File 1)	Kōki Mori, Hwang Il-jin & Seo Sun-yeong	Tatsuo Sato	Kim Bo-kyoung, Ha Seung-hee, Song Hyun-ju, Yoon Jung-hye, Park Ae-lee, Song Seung-taek, Lee Seung-hee, Song Hyeon-ju, Choi Eun-yeong, Kim Sung-bum & Yoon Seung-hyun; Izumi Kawada, Yoshiko Shimizu & Takashi Muratani (chief)	May 16, 2025
8	"There is no such thing as a completely locked room File 2"; Transliteration: "Kanzen na Misshitsu Nado Gozaimasen File 2" (Japanese: 完全な密室などございません File 2)	Tatsunori Miyake & Kim Bong-duk	Tatsuo Sato	Kim Bong-duk, Shin Sung-min, Kim Hyun-kyung, Ko Yu-il, Kim Hee-jung, Cho Mi-jung, Park Jae-suk, Hong Da-young & Airi Takahashi; Izumi Kawada, Yoshiko Shimizu & Takashi Muratani (chief)	May 23, 2025
8	"Please don't drown in this river File 1"; Transliteration: "Kono Kawa de Oborenaide Kudasai File 1" (Japanese: この川で溺れないでください File 1)	Tōru Takahashi & Kim Bong-duk	Koji Sawai	Kim Bong-duk, Shin Sung-min, Kim Hyun-kyung, Ko Yu-il, Kim Hee-jung, Cho Mi-jung, Park Jae-suk, Hong Da-young & Airi Takahashi; Izumi Kawada, Yoshiko Shimizu & Takashi Muratani (chief)	May 23, 2025
9	"Please don't drown in this river File 2"; Transliteration: "Kono Kawa de Oborenaide Kudasai File 2" (Japanese: この川で溺れないでください File 2)	Tōru Takahashi & Gang Tae-sik	Koji Sawai	Han Eun-mi, Kim Ran-yeong, Choi Eun-yeong, Park Yeong-hee, Lee Gyeoung-soon, Park Soo-in, Hong Mi-gyeong & Airi Takahashi; Izumi Kawada & Takashi Muratani (chief)	May 30, 2025
10	"Murder lies in a beautiful rose" Transliteration: "Kireina Bara ni wa Satsui ga Gozaimasu" (Japanese: 綺麗な薔薇には殺意がございます)	Shiro Suzuki	Masaki Matsumura	Shiro Suzuki; Izumi Kawada (chief)	June 6, 2025
11	"The bride is behind locked doors" Transliteration: "Hanayome wa Misshitsu no Naka de Gozaimasu" (Japanese: 花嫁は密室の中でございます)	Yuuki Morishita	Kazuhiro Soeta	Airi Takahashi, Yoshiko Shimizu, Masaki Hinata, Hiroyuki Kasugai & Mayu Murakata; Izumi Kawada (chief)	June 13, 2025
12	"What is it that you have lost?" Transliteration: "Ubawareta no wa Nani de Gozaimasu ka" (Japanese: 奪われたのは何でございますか)	Masaki Matsumura	Masaki Matsumura	Masaki Hinata, Kim Jong Nam, Izumi Kawada, Nana Yamaguchi, Mayu Murakata & Masatsune Noguchi; Izumi Kawada (chief)	June 20, 2025
