= Manpei Takagi =

Japanese actor (born 1985)

Takagi Manpei
- 高木 万平
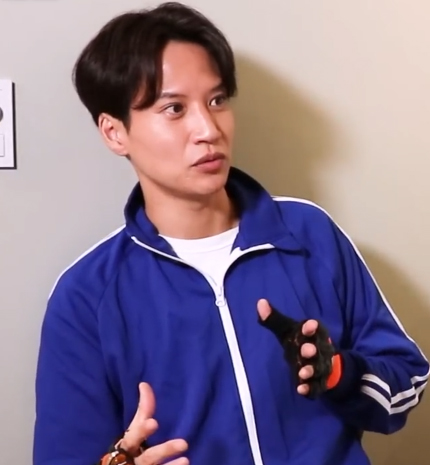
- Takagi in 2022
- Born: October 22, 1985 (age 40); Seto, Aichi, Japan
- Education: Nagoya University
- Occupation: Actor
- Years active: 2007-2017
- Agent: Stardust Promotion
- Relatives: Shinpei Takagi (brother)

Manpei Takagi (高木 万平, Takagi Manpei; born October 22, 1985) is a Japanese former actor and model from Seto, Aichi. He is best known for portraying Retsu Fukami/Geki Blue in the Super Sentai series Juken Sentai Gekiranger. He is the twin brother of actor Shinpei Takagi.

He and Shinpei quit acting in 2017 and is now a freelance photographer.

== Filmography ==
Year	Title	Role	Notes
2007	Juken Sentai Gekiranger: Nei-Nei! Hou-Hou! Hong Kong Decisive Battle	Retsu Fukami/Geki Blue	
2008	Juken Sentai Gekiranger vs Boukenger	Retsu Fukami/Geki Blue	
2009	Engine Sentai Go-onger vs. Gekiranger	Retsu Fukami/Geki Blue	
2012	Ouran High School Host Club (Live Action)	Kaoru Hitachiin	
2012	Sentimental Yasuko	Komagata Kazuki	
2014	Shippu Nijimaru-gumi	Nijikawa Jun	
2014	Kabadieen! Gekitotsu Dokuro Koko hen	Kido	

=== Television ===
Year	Title	Role	Notes
2007	Juken Sentai Gekiranger	Retsu Fukami/Geki Blue	Debut role
2008	Cafe Kichijoji de	Minakawa Hifumi	
2009	Mei-chan no Shitsuji	Akabane Ukon	
2009	Meitantei no Okite	Kaneda in highschool (ep 9)	
2009	Ninkyo Helper	Koga Kensuke	
2010	Tough Nights of Club Indigo	Moichi	
2011	Ouran High School Host Club	Kaoru Hitachiin	
2013	Garo: Yami o Terasu Mono	A random high school student	guest starred (ep 10)
2014	Yu-Gi-Oh! Arc-V	Yuto	Voice
