= List of Twin Spica episodes =

Cover art of the Twin Spica anime adaptation DVD box set released by King Records

Cover image of the Twin Spica live-action adaptation DVD box set released by Geneon Universal Entertainment

The Japanese science fiction manga series Twin Spica (ふたつのスピカ, Futatsu no Supika), written and illustrated by Kou Yaginuma, was adapted into a 20-episode anime series in 2003 and a 7-episode live-action series in 2009. All three productions tell a coming-of-age story of teenager Asumi Kamogawa as she trains to become an astronaut at a fictional space academy in the near future.

Japanese animation studio Group TAC produced Twin Spica's anime adaptation, which was broadcast by NHK. The series premiered on November 1, 2003, and aired until its conclusion on March 27, 2004. Tomomi Mochizuki directed the anime series, and Rika Nakase wrote its screenplay. Masako Goto designed the characters for animation. When the series reached its conclusion, fewer than 30 chapters of the manga had been published. Chapter 25 concludes the story of Asumi and her classmates undergoing a test of their survival skills, was the final chapter to be adapted for the anime. Consequently, the series concludes prematurely with Asumi's ghost companion Lion-san leaving when he no longer has anything to teach her and her friends. The manga, however, continues with Lion-san appearing in subsequent chapters and ended serialization on August 5, 2009. The anime series also aired in Japan, other parts of Asia, and Latin America on Animax. The song "Venus Say" by female pop musical group Buzy (band) was used as the opening theme. Male pop group Begin adapted Kyu Sakamoto's 1963 single "Miagete Goran Yoru no Hoshi o" (見上げてごらん夜の星を; lit. 'Look Up at the Stars at Night') as the ending theme.

NHK announced a live-action Twin Spica adaptation on March 30, 2009, produced in cooperation with the Japan Aerospace Exploration Agency, the country's national aerospace agency. Sixteen-year-old actress Nanami Sakuraba was cast for the role of Asumi Kamogawa. Filming for the series began on April 2, and it was scheduled to air on June 11 but was eventually postponed by one week until June 18. The series aired weekly on NHK General TV and NHK BS Hi-Vision until its conclusion on July 30. The screenplay for the series was written by Shūko Arai and Daigo Matsui. While writing the script, Arai found himself encouraged by the characters who must overcome various struggles in order to achieve their dreams. He also specified hopes and dreams as central themes in the story. Among the changes made in this adaptation is the removal of Lion-san as a central character. Alternative rock band Orange Range's 2009 single "Hitomi no Saki ni" (瞳の先に; lit. 'Ahead of Eyes') was used as the ending theme.

The anime adaptation was released in both VHS and DVD formats by King Records. Both were released in five compilation volumes containing four episodes each. A special DVD collection containing the five flashback episodes—episodes 1, 5, 9, 12, and 16—from the anime was released on May 26, 2004, and a five-disc DVD box set was released on July 22, 2004. A three-disc DVD compilation box set of the live-action adaptation will be released by Geneon Universal Entertainment on December 23, 2009.

== Episode list ==
=== Anime (2003/04) ===
Five of the anime's 20 episodes are told as flashbacks that explore events in Asumi Kamogawa's childhood. The anime series opens with an adaptation of Kou Yaginuma's debut work "The Fireworks of 2015" (2015年の打ち上げ花火, 2015 Nen no Uchiage Hanabi). The remaining flashback episodes—episodes 5, 9, 12, and 16—adapt the short stories "Asumi" (アスミ), "Campanella's Forest" (カムパネルラの森, "Kamupanerura no Mori"), "Our Star, the Leaf Star" (ふたりの星 はっぱ星, "Futari no Hoshi, Happa Hoshi"), and "Asumi's Cherry Tree" (アスミの桜, "Asumi no Sakura"), respectively. The anime adapts the manga's story up to chapter 25, but chapters introducing Kiryū as an additional character are not included in this production.

No.	Title	Directed by	Written by	Original release date	English air date
1	"Fireworks"; Transliteration: "Uchiage Hanabi" (Japanese: 打ち上げ花火)	Kazuhiro Sasaki	Tomomi Mochizuki	November 1, 2003	January 24, 2005
Japan launches its first crewed spaceflight mission, Shishigō, but the rocket explodes after liftoff and crashes into nearby Yuigahama. The accident puts the mother of a young girl named Asumi Kamogawa into a coma. Following her mother's death five years later, Asumi takes the cremated ashes to a shrine where she meets a ghost wearing a lion head costume. She names him Lion-san. On the following day, Asumi's elementary school teacher Yūko Suzunari visits the grave of her astronaut boyfriend who gave her a keychain of the Shishigō mascot—a lion—before dying in the mission. Yūko receives a phone call later that evening from Asumi telling her to open the keychain. She finds an engagement ring inside and also catches a glimpse of Lion-san, who reveals himself as Yūko's deceased boyfriend before disappearing. Asumi declares the next day that she will become a rocket pilot.
2	"Asumi's Dream"; Transliteration: "Asumi no Yume" (Japanese: アスミの夢)	Katsutoshi Sasaki	Rika Nakase	November 8, 2003	January 25, 2005
Years later, Asumi is studying for an entrance examination into the Tokyo Space Academy's inaugural astronaut training course. She hides the desire to enroll from her father due to the family's financial restrictions and worries about leaving him alone. Asumi's father later discovers the application forms and becomes angry, but Asumi tells him that she is withdrawing from the process. Lion-san tells Asumi that her father is not angry at the application but because she stopped talking about her dreams to him. When Asumi visits her father at his workplace that night, he tells her not to withdraw and gives his savings to pay for the application fee. He also reminds her of the space travel ticket she made for him years earlier.
3	"One Step Toward the Stars"; Transliteration: "Hoshi e no Ippo" (Japanese: 星への一歩)	Yūsuke Yamamoto	Rika Nakase	November 15, 2003	January 26, 2005
Asumi finds out that her childhood friend and classmate Shinnosuke Fuchūya is also an applicant to the academy. At the end of the examination, they are taken by bus to another facility in order to take a second examination in a closed environment. Asumi is assigned a room with Kei Ōmi and another girl who does not reveal her name and acts condescendingly toward the two. Fuchūya is grouped with Shū Suzuki and another applicant. Once in their rooms, the teams find out they will be locked in for one week with the provided supplies. They are also assigned a project that is stored in a safe with an electronic lock. The lock, which can only be opened by typing in the randomly assigned room numbers, baffles those who have already forgotten them, but Asumi remembers the numbers clearly. Inside the safe, they find that the project involves dominoes.
4	"Memory of a Distant Day"; Transliteration: "Tooi Hi no Kioku" (Japanese: 遠い日の記憶)	Hiroyuki Yanase	Rika Nakase	November 22, 2003	January 27, 2005
All teams are instructed to line up several thousand tiles for a successful domino effect. Asumi and Kei try to find a nickname for their teammate, but the girl reveals her name as Marika Ukita and asks how Asumi remembered their room number. Asumi tells them that each room number is the distance to a star, and their room number indicates the distance to her favorite star, Spica. Meanwhile, Fuchūya's and Shū's teammate becomes frustrated and threatens to fail the three of them from the examination, but Shū warns him off. On the fourth day, the room experiences a sudden decompression, and the tremor causes all tiles to collapse. Many applicants withdraw when they are unable to withstand the decompression sickness. The incident triggers Asumi's memory as a toddler when she witnessed the Shishigō accident.
5	"My Mother's Face"; Transliteration: "Okāsan no Kao" (Japanese: おかあさんの顔)	Rokō Ogiwara	Tomomi Mochizuki	November 29, 2003	January 28, 2005
Several weeks after the funeral of her mother, Asumi receives an assignment in elementary school to draw a family member. She begins drawing her mother, whose head is entirely wrapped in bandages. That night, Asumi's father tells her that those who have died must cross the Sanzu River into the afterlife. At the riverbank the next day, Asumi's sketchbook falls into the water, and she also falls in while attempting to retrieve it. Fuchūya discovers her unconscious downstream and alerts her father. Asumi enters the spirit world and finds Lion-san but does not recognize him without the lion head costume. He warns Asumi not to reveal her name while in the spirit world. She also encounters a woman whose entire body is wrapped in bandages and realizes it is her mother. The woman asks for Asumi's name, but she lies and says she has forgotten it. Asumi decides to draw her mother again and gives it to her. The woman later regains her sight realizes she was helped by her daughter upon seeing the drawing. She tells Asumi to continue on living, at which point Asumi wakes up in the hospital.
6	"Test Complete"; Transliteration: "Tesuto Shūryou" (Japanese: テスト終了)	Kaori Mokurin	Rika Nakase	December 6, 2003	January 31, 2005
7	"Space Academy Entrance Ceremony"; Transliteration: "Uchū Gakkō Nyūgakushiki" (Japanese: 宇宙学校入学式)	Hong Heon-pyo	Rika Nakase	December 13, 2003	February 1, 2005
8	"One Person's Dream, Everyone's Dream"; Transliteration: "Hitori no Yume, Minna no Yume" (Japanese: ひとりの夢 みんなの夢)	Katsutoshi Sasaki	Rika Nakase	December 20, 2003	February 2, 2005
9	"Campanella's Forest"; Transliteration: "Kamupanerura no Mori" (Japanese: カムパネルラの森)	Shin Ōnuma	Tomomi Mochizuki	January 10, 2004	February 3, 2005
10	"Even Underwater, There is Space"; Transliteration: "Mizu no Nakani mō Uchū" (Japanese: 水の中にも宇宙)	Ken Katō	Rika Nakase	January 17, 2004	February 4, 2005
11	"Wounded Wings"; Transliteration: "Kizutsuita Tsubasa" (Japanese: 傷ついた翼)	Rokō Ogiwara	Rika Nakase	January 24, 2004	February 7, 2005
12	"Our Star, the Leaf Star"; Transliteration: "Futari no Hoshi, Happa Hoshi" (Japanese: ふたりの星 はっぱ星)	Hong Heon-pyo	Tomomi Mochizuki	January 31, 2004	February 8, 2005
13	"The Promised Five"; Transliteration: "Yakusoku no Gonin" (Japanese: 約束の5人)	Kaori Mokurin	Rika Nakase	February 7, 2004	February 9, 2005
14	"Sad Smiling Face"; Transliteration: "Kanashī Egao" (Japanese: 悲しい笑顔)	Katsutoshi Sasaki	Rika Nakase	February 14, 2004	February 10, 2005
15	"All Alone"; Transliteration: "Hitoribocchi" (Japanese: ひとりぼっち)	Tomoaki Ōta	Rika Nakase	February 21, 2004	February 11, 2005
16	"Asumi's Cherry Tree"; Transliteration: "Asumi no Sakura" (Japanese: アスミの桜)	Hideyo Yamamoto	Tomomi Mochizuki	February 28, 2004	February 14, 2005
17	"Survival Training"; Transliteration: "Sabaibaru Kunren" (Japanese: サバイバル訓練)	Rokō Ogiwara	Rika Nakase	March 6, 2004	February 15, 2005
18	"Marika & Marika"; Transliteration: "Marika to Marika" (Japanese: マリカとまりか)	Kaori Mokurin	Rika Nakase	March 13, 2004	February 16, 2005
19	"What You Can Do Now"; Transliteration: "Ima Kimi ni Dekiru Koto" (Japanese: いま君にできること)	Hong Heon-pyo	Rika Nakase	March 20, 2004	February 17, 2005
20	"Look for Tomorrow"; Transliteration: "Ashita o Mitsumete" (Japanese: 明日を見つめて)	Tomomi Mochizuki	Tomomi Mochizuki	March 27, 2004	February 18, 2005

=== Drama (2009) ===
Unlike the anime, flashbacks are only used sparingly in the live-action adaptation. While the story remains true to the primary plot points of the manga, several characters were changed for this production. The removal of Lion-san as a central character that contributes to Asumi's growth and the modification to Marika Ukita's background story are particular examples. Additionally, while the manga spans the four years during which Asumi attends school, the main story in this production spans only several months from the time of their entry into the school in April until their first summer.

No.	Title	Directed by	Written by	Original release date
1	"I Want to Go to Space!"; Transliteration: "Uchū ni Ikitai!" (Japanese: 宇宙に行きたい!)	Takeyoshi Yamamoto	Shūko Arai	June 18, 2009
In the early 21st century, Japan launches its first human spaceflight mission, Shishigō, near the town of Yuigahama. Grade schooler Asumi Kamogawa witnesses the launch with her mother and classmate Shinnosuke Fuchūya, but the rocket explodes moments after liftoff. Ten years later, Asumi and Fuchūya enter the Tokyo Aerospace School.
2	"Astronaut Qualifications"; Transliteration: "Uchū Hikōshi no Shikaku" (Japanese: 宇宙飛行士の資格)	Ayuko Tsukahara	Shūko Arai	June 25, 2009
3	"The Earth is Blue"; Transliteration: "Chikyū wa Aokatta" (Japanese: 地球は青かった)	Ayuko Tsukahara	Daigo Matsui	July 2, 2009
4	"Distance to Space"; Transliteration: "Uchū Made no Kyori" (Japanese: 宇宙までの距離)	Takeyoshi Yamamoto	Daigo Matsui	July 9, 2009
5	"Rivalries Toward Space"; Transliteration: "Uchū e no Raibaru" (Japanese: 宇宙へのライバル)	Takeyoshi Yamamoto	Daigo Matsui	July 16, 2009
6	"Piano to Play in Space"; Transliteration: "Uchū de Hiku Piano" (Japanese: 宇宙で弾くピアノ)	Ayuko Tsukahara	Shūko Arai	July 23, 2009
Shū is diagnosed with acute pancytopenia.
7	"Farewell Aerospace School"; Transliteration: "Sayonara Uchū Gakkō" (Japanese: さよなら宇宙学校)	Takeyoshi Yamamoto	Shūko Arai	July 30, 2009

== See also ==
- List of Twin Spica chapters
