= List of Twin Spica chapters =

Cover art of the first volume of Twin Spica featuring lead character Asumi Kamogawa

Twin Spica (ふたつのスピカ, Futatsu no Supika) is a science fiction manga series written and illustrated by Kou Yaginuma in 89 chapters. The series tells a coming-of-age story of high school students in the early 21st century training to participate in one of Japan's first human spaceflight missions. It centers around the lead character Asumi Kamogawa, whose decision to become an astronaut is influenced by a family tragedy and a mentor figure from her past.

Prior to writing Twin Spica, Yaginuma had written several short stories depicting Asumi's childhood, beginning with "2015:Fireworks" (2015年の打ち上げ花火, 2015 Nen no Uchiage Hanabi). These stories were serialized by Media Factory from the July 2000 issue (released June 5, 2000) of the seinen manga magazine Comic Flapper until June 5, 2002. The Asumi story arc sets the stage for Twin Spica by introducing figures from her childhood that will affect her growth at the fictional Tokyo Space Academy. The main story arc at the space academy was first serialized in the October 2001 issue (released September 5, 2001) of Comic Flapper. It continued until the publication of the 89th chapter on August 5, 2009. Both story arcs have been compiled into 16 bound volumes, with chapters of the Asumi story arc interspersed among several volumes. The series is licensed by Tong Li Publishing for Chinese-language release in Taiwan under the title Dream of Spica (Chinese: 麥穗星之夢; pinyin: Màisuìxīng zhī mèng).

Following a three-week contract negotiation, New York City-based Vertical Inc announced on September 25, 2009, that it had acquired the license to publish Twin Spica in English. Vertical marketing director Ed Chavez explained that the motivation to acquire Twin Spica came about from the company's desire to license works from Japanese publishers that have yet to form a partnership with major American publishers. Chavez proposed that Vertical continued its previous partnership with Media Factory, a smaller publishing company from which Vertical licensed the Guin Saga manga in 2007. In assessing the series for possible licensing, Chavez, a fan of science fiction, found Twin Spica's story "technically sound" and noted it as "possibly one of the most heartfelt series I've read in ages". Vertical expected that the series would help broaden its reader base. Twin Spica would also introduce science fiction to readers in anticipation of future Vertical licenses of works by Osamu Tezuka and the Year 24 Group. While the series was originally published in a seinen magazine, Chavez expected that it would also appeal to fans of shōjo manga. Beginning with the seventh volume of the manga, the American publisher Vertical Inc started including more chapters in each volume compared to their Japanese counterparts. Volume 12, released in March 2012 is the final English volume, collecting together volumes 15 and 16 of the Japanese release.

== Volume list ==
No.	Original release date	Original ISBN	North American release date	North American ISBN
1	January 23, 2002	978-4-8401-0428-9	May 4, 2010	978-1-934287-84-2
Chapters: "Mission:01"; "Mission:02"; "Mission:03"; "Mission:04"; Flashbacks: "2015:Fireworks" (2015年の打ち上げ花火, "2015 Nen no Uchiage Hanabi"); "Asumi" (アスミ); Anecdote: "Another Spica" (もうひとつのスピカ, "Mō Hitotsu no Supika")
In the year 2024, 15-year-old Asumi Kamogawa applies for entrance into the Tokyo Space Academy to fulfill her dream of becoming an astronaut. Asumi hides her intentions from her father, Tomoro Kamogawa, and pays for the examination fee herself, but he discovers an application packet sent by the school. Although initially angered by his daughter's actions, Tomoro supports Asumi and promises to pay for her tuition fees. Asumi and her childhood friend, Shinnosuke Fuchūya, complete the written portion of the entrance examination, but they are then taken with the other applicants to another location for a practical examination. Applicants are divided by gender into groups of three and confined to isolation chambers for one week. Asumi is assigned to a group with Kei Oumi and Marika Ukita, and Fuchūya is assigned to a group with Shū Suzuki and another applicant. Each group must complete an assigned task: line up several thousand domino pieces to create a successful domino effect. Throughout the week, each group must overcome differences among the members and endure a case of decompression sickness. Both Asumi's and Fuchūya's groups decide not to sleep for the final two nights in order to complete the task. In a flashback to the year 2010, Japan launches the Lion (獅子号, Shishigō) in the country's first human spaceflight mission, but the fuel catches fire 72 seconds after liftoff and the rocket crashes into nearby Yuigahama. Asumi's mother, who has been in a coma since the incident, dies five years later. Asumi meets the ghost of an astronaut who was on board the Lion, whom she calls Mr. Lion, and buries her mother's ashes with his help. Asumi later falls into a river but is rescued by Fuchūya. While unconscious, Asumi finds her mother in the spirit world and helps her cross the Sanzu River before waking up.
2	April 23, 2002	978-4-8401-0440-1	July 6, 2010	978-1-934287-86-6
Chapters: "Mission:05"; "Mission:06"; "Mission:07"; "Mission:08"; Flashbacks: "Campanella's Forest" (カムパネルラの森, "Kamupanerura no Mori"); "Our Stars, Leaf Stars" (ふたりの星 はっぱ星, "Futari no Hoshi, Happa Hoshi"); Anecdote: "Another Spica" (もうひとつのスピカ, "Mō Hitotsu no Supika")
Asumi, Fuchūya, Kei, and Marika attend the Tokyo Space Academy entrance ceremony as members of the inaugural astronaut training program, but Shū skips it despite being appointed the new student representative. Asumi's father visits Tokyo that evening and gives Asumi a hair clip her mother had kept for her. Students in the astronaut program undergo extensive physical training and attend courses ranging from astrophysics to space medicine. Although Marika distances herself from the group, Asumi continues to reach out to her. Marika initially questions Asumi's motives but begins to see the value Asumi places on friendship and her dedication to training. Because Asumi has a smaller body compared to her classmates, the academy must order a new space suit for her. Takahito Sano, a teacher in the astronaut training program who blames Asumi's father for the Lion incident, uses this as an excuse to ask the school board to dismiss Asumi from the academy to limit "unnecessary" expenditures. The board rejects Sano's proposal, but he tells Asumi that her father is responsible for the crash of the Lion. Disturbed by this revelation, Asumi distances herself from her friends and decides to return to Yuigahama. In a flashback, Asumi goes on a hiking trip with her class during elementary school but runs into the forest alone. Her teacher Yuko Suzunari and Fuchūya find Asumi hiding in a makeshift rocket built by Mr. Lion while he was still alive. Another flashback shows Tomoro Kamogawa being transferred from his duties as a rocket engineer to a division responsible for compensating families who lost relatives in the Lion incident. He is despised by them and meets Kasane Shibata, a girl who bears scars as a result of the accident and befriends Asumi. Kasane finds out that Tomoro is Asumi's father and stops meeting her. Asumi later discovers that Kasane is moving away from Yuigahama and bids her farewell at the train station while promising to remain her friend.
3	November 20, 2002	978-4-8401-0468-5	September 7, 2010	978-1-934287-90-3
Chapters: "Mission:09"; "Mission:10"; "Mission:11"; "Mission:12"; "Mission:13"; Flashback: "Asumi's Cherry Blossoms" (アスミの桜, "Asumi no Sakura"); Anecdote: "Another Spica" (もうひとつのスピカ, "Mō Hitotsu no Supika")
Asumi returns home and finds an invitation to her elementary school teacher's wedding. She finds Mr. Lion, who planned to marry Yuko before his death, on the ridge overlooking the wedding chapel. Mr. Lion tells Asumi that no one truly knows what caused the Lion accident and that everyone involved with the project feels the same responsibility. Asumi returns to Tokyo the next day with Mr. Lion. Following a marathon race during physical training, Asumi and her four friends make a promise that none of them will leave the academy until they have graduated. Sano resigns from the academy after he tells his students that not everyone will become an astronaut. Sano recalls that Tomoro Kamogawa's design for the Lion was chosen over his but finds out that Tomoro was fired when the project faced a budget cut. Kei proposes a summer trip for the group, and Asumi expresses her desire to visit a new observatory in Chiba Prefecture. Asumi invites Marika along, but she declines. Asumi and Kei go to Marika's house on the day of the trip to invite her once again and find Marika in a fight with her father. The three escape and meet with Fuchūya and Shū for their journey. Marika falls unconscious during the hike to the observatory and recalls the solitary life imposed upon her as a child. She regains consciousness but slips off a ridge with Asumi, who attempts to catch her fall. They are rescued several hours later and find out that the observatory is closed. In a flashback to Asumi's first year in middle school, a dying classmate named Takashi Shimazu befriends Asumi. She becomes close to Takashi, only to distance herself from him after classmates circulate rumors about their relationship. Takashi dies soon after and leaves a drawing of Asumi as a gift, and Asumi finally realizes her affection for him.
4	May 23, 2003	978-4-8401-0490-6	November 2, 2010	978-1-934287-93-4
Chapters: "Mission:14"; "Mission:15"; "Mission:16"; "Mission:17"; "Mission:18"; Flashback: "This Star Spica" (コノ星スピカ, "Kono Hoshi Supika"); Anecdotes: "Sentimental" (センチメンタル, "Senchimentaru"); "Another Spica" (もうひとつのスピカ, "Mō Hitotsu no Supika")
Back at school after the holidays, Asumi, Kei and Marika are introduced to the EVA training pool. Asumi discovers that due to an injury she received while falling off the cliff during the summer break, the grip strength in her left hand has reduced, and she recalled some of the training that Mr. Lion had put her through. Back at the Seagull Dormitory, she is introduced to a new resident - Marika. The students are taken to watch a rocket launch at the launch centre. On the ferry home, Asumi sees some people who are protesting the amount of money going towards the space program, one of whom is the spitting image of Takashi Shimazu, her deceased friend from middle school. Kei comes to visit Asumi at the dormitory, but she is out. However, Marika's father comes to speak to her. She refuses to return home with him, and he leaves medicine and money for her. While on his part-time job, Shū finds Asumi standing in the street crying for her lost friend, and he takes her stargazing to cheer her up. In Marika's room, Asumi finds a photo showing Marika, but dated 2007, seventeen years previously. While Asumi and Marika go for a new year's shrine visit together, Mr. Lion tries to reconcile the existence of Marika with his memories of a girl he met while he was alive, who was identical in both appearance and name. He remembers meeting his father in the spirit world and helping him to reach the Sanzu River. The girls perform zero-g training on the vomit comet. The boy from the protest finds a keychain that Asumi dropped, and promises to return it to her. In a flashback to elementary school, Miss Suzunari pressures Fuchūya to be a friend for Asumi, and he lets her play on his scooter. In another side story, two old school friends - a boy, Kamoi, and a girl, Kasumi Tsushima - meet on a train, and remember their school days together. Kamoi once had a tiny harmonica and dreamed about playing it in space like Wally Schirra, which Tsushima used to tease him about, but he'd lost it. Tsushima tells Kamoi she is getting married, and as they part ways, she reveals that he has his lost harmonica, having stolen it from him all those years ago.
5	October 23, 2003	978-4-8401-0906-2	January 4, 2011	978-1-935654-02-5
Chapters: "Mission:19"; "Mission:20"; "Mission:21"; "Mission:22"; "Mission:23"; "Mission:24"; Anecdote: "Another Spica" (もうひとつのスピカ, "Mō Hitotsu no Supika")
At the boys' school, some bullies steal Asumi's keychain and crush it, thinking it to be his. Unsure of how to get her keychain back from the boy, Asumi and Kei go to find his school. He tells her that he threw it away, and that he considers rockets as weapons. Asumi runs away in tears, but Kei encounters the bullies, who tell her that his name is Kiriu. Thinking that he might be a victim of the Lion incident, Kei recruits Shū to help her search the victim records. They find that Kiriu lost his parents and elder brother, but Kei also find's Asumi's mother's name. Kei warns Kiriu not to speak ill of Asumi, and gives Asumi a map to the orphanage where Kiriu is living. Asumi finds Kiriu and tells him that space is her one dream. The next day, he returns her keychain, found and repaired. Asumi meets some of the other children from the orphanage, and they tell her about Kiriu, while she shows them a bottle rocket and teaches them about space. As the students start their second year of the astronaut course, their numbers have reduced from twenty-six to fourteen. They are told to enter escape pods to try them out, but while they're inside, they're taken into wilderness for survival training. Asumi is self-sufficient, despite lacking a compass in her survival kit, but fails to see Marika sitting despondently by a tree, with blood smeared on her face. She does, however, find an empty escape pod with a bloody hand print. Meanwhile, Mr. Lion returns to Yuigahama to investigate his memories of a girl who looked like Marika. He flashes back to when he was a boy, building the rocket ship hideout in the mountains, where he meets a girl who is not allowed to leave her room because she's suffering from a disease. Having learnt that she wants to dance like in Beauty and the Beast, he makes a beast mask, and sneaks into her room. She thinks the mask looks more like a lion, and they dance. She reveals that for a long time, she's been sneaking out to watch him build the fort. However, her disease takes a turn for the worse, and her father takes her away to Switzerland. In the present day, Mr. Lion finds the girl's name scratched onto the rocket ship - Marika.
6	April 23, 2004	978-4-8401-0944-4	March 1, 2011	978-1-935654-03-2
Chapters: "Mission:25"; "Mission:26"; "Mission:27"; "Mission:28"; "Mission:29"; Flashback: "Tiny, Tiny Aqua Star" (小さな小さな水の星, "Chiisana Chiisana Mizu no Hoshi"); Anecdote: "Another Spica" (もうひとつのスピカ, "Mō Hitotsu no Supika")
A search team finds Marika by following her tracking beacon, and Asumi finds her way to the goal - the rest had already arrived a day earlier, but Shū is humbled by the fact that not only did she manage to return without the aid of a compass, but she did it using only half her food rations. Meanwhile, Kiriu finds one of the other orphanage kids, Akane, waiting outside in the hot sun in case Asumi passes by. She eventually develops heat stroke, and Kiriu rushes her to a clinic. Asumi invites Kiriu to watch a meteor shower with her. That Sunday, the students head to school for a special visit from an astronaut, Ryohei Haijima. They are all disappointed with the Haijima's brief replies to questions, but Mr. Lion recognizes him as a former classmate - and the man who should have been on the Lion in Mr. Lion's place, had he not become sick. With Asumi's help, Mr. Lion is able to play his harmonica for Haijima. During a simulator test, Asumi and Fuchūya fail when he mistakes a red button for a green one. As the summer holidays approach, the children all plan a trip to Yuigahama. Shū moves into the school archive building, which used to be his grandfather's house, while Fuchūya tells Asumi that his own grandfather has died. In a flashback to elementary school, the girls in Asumi's class tease her for claiming to have seen a ghost, Mr. Lion, and to have seen her mother in the spirit world. Fuchūya defends her in secret, and Fuchūya's grandfather gives her a sparkler to cheer her up. A few nights later, though, one of the bullies, Yuzu, comes to Asumi's house - she wants to see her mother, who had just died, and wants to find out how Asumi did it. Asumi shows Yuzu the river where she almost drowned. Yuzu tries to throw herself into the river, but Asumi holds her back, and tells her she made up the whole thing. Just then, a swarm of fireflies appears. The next day, Yuzu and Asumi make up.
7	December 22, 2004	978-4-8401-0984-0	May 3, 2011	978-1-935654-12-4
Chapters: "Mission:30"; "Mission:31"; "Mission:32"; "Mission:33"; "Mission:34"; "Mission:35"; Anecdote: "Another Spica" (もうひとつのスピカ, "Mō Hitotsu no Supika"); Note: The English volume 7 contains Missions 30 to 38, and the Anecdote chapters from the Japanese volumes 7 and 8.
The children arrive in Yuigahama, and head to the Lion incident memorial to pay their respects. Kei and Marika sleep with Asumi in her room, while Shū stays with Fuchūya. The next day, they go swimming at the beach, but when Kei tries to goad Marika into telling a secret about herself, Marika heads back to Asumi's house alone. Asumi recalls Mr. Lion telling her about his suspicions regarding Marika - that there are two of them. While waiting for Asumi to return with the key, Marika hears the sound of music and follows it into the forest. Asumi and Kei spend the night searching the town for her. In the morning, Marika finds Mr. Lion's rocket ship in the forest, and remembers watching its construction, despite never having been there before. Asumi and the others find her there, and she admits to them all that she's an illegally created clone of the other Marika. Sano visits Asumi's father, wanting to find out the truth of the Lion incident. Concerned for Marika's health, the children end their holiday early, and take Marika back to her father. Worried that she won't be able to return to school after the summer break, they come to her house and shine a planetarium through her bedroom window. School resumes, and the students train with a robotic arm. Kiriu invites Asumi to a concert he'll be performing in with a volunteer group, and she accepts, but the next day at school, she is informed that everyone will be doing special training for a week at a different location - a prison.
8	May 23, 2005	978-4-8401-1307-6	July 5, 2011	978-1-935654-13-1
Chapters: "Mission:36"; "Mission:37"; "Mission:38"; "Mission:39"; "Mission:40"; "Mission:41"; Anecdote: "Another Spica" (もうひとつのスピカ, "Mō Hitotsu no Supika"); Note: The English volume 8 contains Missions 39 to 46, and the Flashback and Anecdote chapters from the Japanese volume 9.
The students are divided into groups, locked into separate cells and given a week to escape. Marika, Kei, Fuchūya and Shū resolve to try to escape sooner, so that Asumi can make it to Kiriu's concert. Meanwhile, Mr. Lion helps Kiriu practice for the concert by drawing easier arrangements for the part he has to play in the dirt. While locked in their cells, both Asumi and Fuchūya dream of Takashi. On the third day, the girls are allowed to meet together to confer. They're not able to devise any escape plans, but a comment that Asumi makes gives Marika an idea. On the fifth day, Asumi discovers she can hear Kei's voice coming through the floor of her cell, and realises the cells must be connected underneath. Marika comes up with a plan to pry up the floorboards, and the three of them work all night, getting into a tunnel below the floors and escaping. Shū and Fuchūya also escape later in the day, but it's too late for Asumi to make it back in time for the concert. Fuchūya takes Asumi to the orphanage, where the concert is long over, but Kiriu is waiting for Asumi, and plays the harmonica for her. Later, Asumi tells Mr. Lion that she's always regretted her last words to Takashi. Asumi's favourite planetarium closes, and Kei, Asumi and Marika go stargazing on the school's roof. Kei catches a cold, so Asumi and Marika go to visit her. Behind a photo of Kei's middle-school crush that's in Kei's room, they accidentally discover a photo of Shū. Shiomi tells Shū the school is planning to recommend him for a position on the American space program. The others find him playing a piano in an empty room - Kei requests he play "The Flea Waltz". As Christmas nears, Kiriu tells Asumi he's planning on leaving Japan.
9	December 22, 2005	978-4-8401-1349-6	September 6, 2011	978-1-935654-23-0
Chapters: "Mission:42"; "Mission:43"; "Mission:44"; "Mission:45"; "Mission:46"; Flashback: "Giovanni's Ticket" (ジヨバンニの切符, "Jiyobanni no Kippu"); Anecdotes: "Konohana Cherry Tree" (コノハナ桜, "Konohana Sakura"); "Another Spica" (もうひとつのスピカ, "Mō Hitotsu no Supika"); Note: The English volume 9 contains Missions 47 to 55, and the Anecdote chapters from the Japanese volumes 10 and 11.
Kiriu tells Asumi he was accepted into an overseas volunteer group, helping orphans in disaster areas. Asumi wishes him luck. As exam time approaches, the students turn to study, but Asumi discovers she has an exam on the day that Kiriu is leaving. Later, Asumi finds the young children from the orphanage folding origami stars for Kiriu. During the exam, Fuchūya shouts at Asumi that she should go see him off if she cares about him, and she arrives at the train station just as his train leaves. One of the children gives her a letter from Kiriu, where he explains how his feelings have changed since they first met and thanks Asumi. As Fuchūya and Asumi prepare for a make-up exam, Fuchūya remembers a time when he saw a mysterious green star with Asumi. Shū tries to get his father to sign a permission form to allow him to study overseas, and recalls the death of his mother from a disease, having been abandoned by his father. By his mother's grave, his father gives him the signed permission form, but disowns him. While studying for the test, Shū has a nosebleed. Shū goes to take the astronaut selection test, and his friends give him an origami star as a lucky charm. In a brief flashback chapter, Asumi and Kasane go for a ride on a trolley built by Fuchūya. Mr. Lion showers bags of leaf-shaped stars over them. In a side story, a woman named Kasumi Suzuki remembers her time at school. In a book named "Guide to Cherry Blossoms", she found that someone had drawn on the edges of the pages, so that when they're fanned out, they formed an image of a cherry blossom tree. She found out it was drawn by a boy named Yusuke Kamoi. She talked to him, and he gave her a sketchbook. Before she could confess her love for him, they graduated from school, and he moved away. In the present day, Kasumi has come to an art gallery to see a work by Kamoi, who has become famous - the work is named "Guide to Cherry Blossoms". She returns to her school, where she is now teaching, and finds the original book. The drawing on the pages shows herself, sketching beneath the cherry blossom tree.
10	March 23, 2006	978-4-8401-1377-9	November 1, 2011	978-1-935654-24-7
Chapters: "Mission:47"; "Mission:48"; "Mission:49"; "Mission:50"; "Mission:51"; "Mission:52"; Anecdote: "Another Spica" (もうひとつのスピカ, "Mō Hitotsu no Supika"); Note: The English volume 10 contains Missions 56 to 64, and the Anecdote chapters from the Japanese volume 12.
Asumi dreams of a time in elementary school, when she buried a time capsule containing an essay about her dream to be a rocket driver - and another, secret dream - beneath a tree in the school playground. In the present day, Shū has become famous, and a large group of reporters have gathered outside the school. One of them, Ichimura, sees Marika, and recognizes her. While on his part-time job, Fuchūya accidentally discovers Marika working in a coffee shop. Kei gets into a fight with a group of boys who were criticizing Shū, and she tells Asumi that she's fallen in love with him. Asumi's dorm has a new resident, a first-year named Mikan, but Asumi is saddened when Mikan thinks Asumi is also a first-year. The students do decompression testing, and Kei is determined to beat Shū's time. Fuchūya tells Asumi where Marika is working, and Mr. Lion discovers one of his hands is fading. Sano returns to the school, to confront the school chairman over his role in the Lion incident - in order to cut costs, he purchased equipment, including the main engine, from a foreign company. Enraged at the chairman's callous attitude, Sano beats him up, and is dragged away by the police. On the way out, he gives Asumi a package to deliver to her father - a CD, containing all of the work that the two of them did at college. Sano has a flashback to his girlfriend, who was in Yuigahama to watch the launch, and died in the crash. Sano visits Asumi's father, who is sitting on Yuigahama beach launching rockets. Asumi's father jokingly suggests that the two of them should form an aeronautics company together. Asumi has been drawing stars on the ground in the back alley behind Marika's work, to cheer her up. Mr. Lion muses as to why he is stuck in the world of the living, and how much longer he has, and Asumi finds a strange girl sleeping in her bed. In the morning, the girl is gone, but Mikan sees her sitting in a park that evening, and Asumi goes to see her - it's Kasane Shibata, her friend from childhood. She tells Asumi she's in Tokyo for classes, but Mr. Lion sees her in the park during the day.
11	November 22, 2006	978-4-8401-1635-0	January 10, 2012	978-1-935654-33-9
Chapters: "Mission:53"; "Mission:54"; "Mission:55"; "Mission:56"; "Mission:57"; "Mission:58"; Anecdote: "Another Spica" (もうひとつのスピカ, "Mō Hitotsu no Supika"); Note: The English volume 11 contains Missions 65 to 75, and the Anecdote chapters from the Japanese volumes 13 and 14.
Kasane tells Asumi she's been enjoying school, and Asumi shows her a planetarium that Fuchūya made. Fuchūya sees Kasane in the park during the day and tells Asumi. To cheer her up, Asumi draws a field of stars in the dirt. Kasane admits the truth to Asumi - she's run away, because she's been hating school. Asumi tells her to look up at the sky more, and Kasane goes to ask a favour from Fuchūya. Kasane returns home, resolved to be more like Asumi. She has a planetarium that Fuchūya taught her how to make, and when she uses it back at her school, the head of the astronomy club sees it and asks her to join. Back at school, the next intensive training project is announced - they'll be performing EVA in a pool, but competing against a robot. Asumi wonders if robots will replace human astronauts someday. Meanwhile, Ichimura remembers his time as a child in Yuigahama, when the child Mr. Lion came to his house with a sick girl on his back - the first Marika. They took Marika to hospital, but her father came and took her away. In the present day, Ichimura recognizes the present Marika's father as being the same man. At the EVA training pool, the children are divided into groups. The goal is to complete a task before the robots can. Kei and Fuchūya's group is up first, but they are soundly beaten by the robots. Shū suggests a debriefing session, so that they can help the later groups perform better. On the final day, it's Marika and Asumi's turn in the pool. The robot engineers scoff at Asumi's size, so Marika makes a bet that the humans will win, and she'll leave the school if they lose. Later, he admits to the school's gym teacher that as the son of the man who captained the Lion, he wants to develop the robots so that no one else has to die. The notes collected by Kei have helped the group, and they're much faster than the robots. However, with just a short time to go before they win, the communications line breaks down, and they decide to abort rather than continue, thus losing. Marika and Asumi explain that if this were in space, it'd be dangerous to continue, and they're not willing to put their lives on the line for that. On the bus, Asumi asks Marika not to threaten quitting, even as a joke, and Marika replies that it's only natural for her stand up for a friend.
12	March 23, 2007	978-4-8401-1687-9	March 6, 2012	978-1-935654-34-6
Chapters: "Mission:59"; "Mission:60"; "Mission:61"; "Mission:62"; "Mission:63"; "Mission:64"; Anecdote: "Another Spica" (もうひとつのスピカ, "Mō Hitotsu no Supika"); Note: The English volume 12 contains Missions 76 to 89, and the Anecdote chapters from the Japanese volumes 15 and 16. This is the final volume for the English-language version.
The group start to plan their summer vacation. So that the choice will be fair, Kei announces that they will each write their suggestion, and they'll draw one out of a bag. To their collective surprise, they discover that all five of them wrote "Yuigahama". After paying their respects at the Lion memorial, they all promise to meet up at Yuigahama every year, no matter where their lives take them. The group go to a summer festival, with Marika borrowing Asumi's mother's yukata. Shū wins a necklace for Kei at the shooting game. The next day, they go to the beach together, and that night, while out stargazing, Shū tells the others he passed the astronaut selection test. Marika tells them about her disease - and that unless a cure is found, she could never become an astronaut. At the space school, the news has broken that Shū has been selected, and the reporters are out in force. Ichimura meets a freelance writer, Yamaji, who asks him about Marika. When Shū is absent from an assembly called to congratulate him, the others find him sleeping on the roof of the school building. That evening, he leaves the school to begin training. Fuchūya has a flashback to a time in elementary school. Trying to show off to his friends, he made a dragonfly firework, but it misfired, going off in his face and damaging his vision. Three weeks after Shū left, Asumi receives a phone call from Shū's little sister, who tells Asumi that her brother has died.
13	December 22, 2007	978-4-8401-1984-9	n/a	—
Chapters: "Mission:65"; "Mission:66"; "Mission:67"; "Mission:68"; "Mission:69"; Anecdote: "Another Spica" (もうひとつのスピカ, "Mō Hitotsu no Supika")
In a flashback to Shū's last days, he was getting settled into training, when he suddenly started coughing up blood. He was hospitalized, and his father tells the doctors that Shū's mother died of the same disease. Shū's younger half-sister Sakura came to visit him, and he told her not to give up on her dreams. He asked her to buy a drink for him, but when she returned, he had died. A great number of people attend the memorial service for Shū, but there is no sign of Fuchūya. During the service, Sakura plays "The Flea Waltz" on the piano, to satisfy Shū's last request to her. Later, Asumi reminds Kei that she once asked Shū to play that song. Marika goes to find Fuchūya, and finds him mourning on his own. Kei recalls that during the summer festival in Yuigahama, she confessed her love to him, but he turned her down, since he was about to start the astronaut training course. Kei and Asumi mourn him together. Back in training at school, Kei tells Asumi that she's not going to whine or complain any more. Yamaji calls Ichimura - he's uncovered evidence that Marika is an illegally created clone. Marika returns home to meet her father - he tells her that Shū had the same disease that she does. She refuses to withdraw from the space school, shouting at him and storming out. Ichimura asks Yamaji to not release his findings to the press, as having the circumstances behind her birth made public would end her dreams, even though she herself had done nothing wrong. Yamaji refuses, because if they don't expose Marika's father now, there's nothing preventing him from doing it again. Marika tells the others what her father told her, and they promise to keep helping her up, even if she stumbles.
14	March 22, 2008	978-4-8401-2205-4	n/a	—
Chapters: "Mission:70"; "Mission:71"; "Mission:72"; "Mission:73"; "Mission:74"; "Mission:75"; Anecdote: "Another Spica" (もうひとつのスピカ, "Mō Hitotsu no Supika")
Ichimura has discovered that Marika's father visits a grave in Yuigahama on the same day every year, and heads there so he can meet him. They talk, Ichimura reminding Marika's father that they'd met in the past. Ichimura is satisfied that Marika's father will never clone her again, and convinces Yamaji to drop the story. Asumi, Kei, Marika and Fuchūya meet together in a park to do stargazing, and the four of them reaffirm the promise that they'd all made together in their first year - even without Shū, none of them will leave the academy until they have graduated. The space school students are taken to this year's intensive training - round-the-clock training on a remote island, with only four hours' sleep per night. At the end of the week, the students are all put onto a bus. In the middle of nowhere, the bus stops, and the gym teacher gives Asumi and envelope and tells her to get off. The envelope contains a map and instructions - reach the marked goal before sunset. She must stay on the marked course, and cannot help other students. Further along the course, Fuchūya theorizes that Asumi was let off first because she was judged to be the strongest of the students - and she soon overtakes him. Even further along, Kei missteps and almost slips down a hill. Asumi reaches her and tries to help, but knowing that would disqualify her, Fuchūya stops her. He tells her that he has colour-blindness, and would never be able to become an astronaut. Sending Asumi on her way, he helps Kei. Later on, Asumi reaches Marika, but she has already become exhausted and pressed an emergency distress button. Asumi continues on, but then comes back to help Marika, reasoning that since Marika has already been disqualified, helping her won't count against Asumi. In the end, none of the students were able to reach the goal in time. Fuchūya returns home to Yuigahama to discuss his future with his parents, but en route, the train he's on is buried in a landslide.
15	June 23, 2009	978-4-8401-2576-5	n/a	—
Chapters: "Mission:76"; "Mission:77"; "Mission:78"; "Mission:79"; "Mission:80"; "Mission:81"; "Mission:82"; Anecdotes: "Three-Dimensional Spica" (三次元のスピカ, "Sanjigen no Supika"); "Another Spica" (もうひとつのスピカ, "Mō Hitotsu no Supika")
Fuchūya is awakened in the overturned carriage by a voice, which directs him to a boy buried in dirt at the back of the carriage. Fuchūya digs him out and performs CPR. After a time, they are saved by rescue workers. Kei, looking for Marika, accidentally overhears her telling Shiomi about her disease. Asumi teaches the children at the orphanage about space. The three of them go to a new year's shrine visit together, then decide to do something for fun. They climb a tall building that Marika once climbed as a child, and go stargazing together. The next day, after a sleepless night, the remaining students assemble to hear which of them will advance to the fourth year of the course - the rest of them would be graduating, or could transfer to other courses. Only one student is chosen to advance: Asumi Kamogawa. All of the other students gather together after school and congratulate her. Marika decides to try the extremely difficult exam to transfer to the medical course. Fuchūya has already decided to enrol at a public college to study flame colours, while Kei researches university entrance exams. Marika meets her father, and the two of them come to a greater understanding of each other. After a conversation with Marika, Kei has regained her confidence, and has decided to enrol in a college with a photography major. As Asumi packs up and prepares to move out of the dormitory, the others have all passed their entrance exams. While Asumi is talking with Mr. Lion, she sees him fade out of sight completely, but he returns to focus when she calls for him. Kei and Fuchūya graduate, and the gym teacher, as their year advisor, gives them all a farewell message. Kei and Marika take Asumi to the train station to see her off, and give her a laptop so that she can keep in touch.
16	October 23, 2009	978-4-8401-2923-7	n/a	—
Chapters: "Mission:83"; "Mission:84"; "Mission:85"; "Mission:86"; "Mission:87"; "Mission:88"; "Mission:89"; Anecdote: "Another Spica" (もうひとつのスピカ, "Mō Hitotsu no Supika")
Six months have passed, and Asumi has been selected to the crew of the new Lion as an EVA specialist. At eighteen, she is the world's youngest astronaut. In Yuigahama, Asumi's father gets a visit from Sano, who has a list of tasks for him to do - Sano has started a private aerospace company, as Asumi's father suggested, and wants him to be a part of it. Kei has been visiting Asumi's favourite stargazing spots in order to take photographs, while Marika has been studying hard in the medical course. On the night before Asumi's launch, the two of them stay in Marika's room together, but neither of them can sleep. The next morning, Asumi's launch goes off without a hitch. Asumi performs her duties well, but is starting to feel incredibly homesick. The crew of the ship give her some time off to look at the Earth. She wears her mother's hairpin. The ship returns to Japan safely. In Yuigahama, the four friends are making plans to meet together. Fuchūya gives Asumi an access pass to a front-row vantage point for the town fireworks display. Asumi, with Mr. Lion alongside, arrives first. He tells her it's his time to go, and starts floating into the air. Fuchūya, Kei and Marika all see him from a distance, and Fuchūya realises it's Mr. Lion's voice that he'd heard on the train. Mr. Lion rises out of sight, but the others tell Asumi not to mourn - she's not alone. Another year passes. In a letter written to Mr. Lion, Asumi says that she is now living in an apartment behind her old dormitory. Her father has been working hard with Sano, Kei has had her astronomy photographs published in magazines, Marika is researching a cure for her own disease, and Fuchūya has been learning about rocket fuels and combustibles, and helping Asumi's father's company in his free time. In Tokyo, a mysterious figure wearing a rabbit costume head meets Akane, and she helps him fold an origami star. Asumi herself is studying for a teaching degree, and has been lecturing at elementary schools about space. Today, she has returned to her own elementary school in Yuigahama, where she finds a group of children - who don't recognize her - looking for a place to bury their time capsule. When digging in a potential spot, they accidentally uncover Asumi's time capsule. They read her dream to become a rocket driver, and are surprised when she recounts the rest from memory: her second dream is to become Mr. Lion wife, so that they can be together forever. This year, like they promised, the four friends have gathered together in Yuigahama, each of them, in their own ways, still working towards their dreams.

== See also ==
- List of Twin Spica episodes
