= Yaginuma =

Yaginuma (written: 柳沼 or 八木沼) is a Japanese surname. Notable people with the surname include:

- Hiroka Yaginuma (柳沼 寛香; born 1981), Japanese professional wrestler
- Junko Yaginuma (八木沼 純子; born 1973), Japanese figure skater
- Kou Yaginuma (柳沼 行; born 1973), Japanese manga artist
