= Yuko Takayama =

Japanese actress (born 1992)

- 高山 侑子
- Born: October 13, 1992 (age 33); Niigata Prefecture, Japan
- Years active: 2008–present
- Agent: Stardust Promotion
- Height: 165 cm (5 ft 5 in)
- Website: www.stardust.co.jp/section3/profile/takayamayuko.html

Yuko Takayama (高山 侑子, Takayama Yūko; born October 13, 1992 in Niigata Prefecture) is a Japanese actress known for her role as Rei in Mutant Girls Squad and also Rinko Daimon in the 2012 Kamen Rider series Kamen Rider Wizard. She is affiliated with Stardust Promotion.

== Filmography ==
=== TV series ===
Year	Title	Role	Other notes
2008	Guren Onna	Miyuki Nakagawa	
2009	Twin Spica	Kei Oumi	live-action adaptation
2010	Mitsudomoe	Ryuuta Sugisaki	also in Mitsudomoe Zouryouchuu!
2010	Hammer Session!	Mashio Nitta	
2011	URAKARA	Saki	
2011	Piece Vote	Midori Kashiwabara	
2012	Kamen Rider Wizard	Rinko Daimon	
2013	Public Affairs Office in the Sky	Kamitani	
2015	Detective vs. Detectives	Ryoko Ine	
2016	Nigeru wa Haji da ga Yaku ni Tatsu	Aoi Moriyama	

=== Films ===
Year	Title	Role	Other notes
2008	Yomigaeru Sora – Rescue Wings	Haruka Kawashima	Main Role
2009	Hana no Asuka-gumi Neo!	Asuka Kuraku	Main Role
2009	Your Story — 女の子ものがたり (onna no ko monogatari, Girl Story)	Misa	
2010	Mutant Girls Squad	Rei	
2010	Kamen Rider × Kamen Rider × Kamen Rider The Movie: Cho-Den-O Trilogy	Miku Uehara	Episode Blue
2012	Kamen Rider × Kamen Rider Wizard & Fourze: Movie War Ultimatum	Rinko Daimon	
2013	Travelers: Jigen Keisatsu	Haruka	
2013	Kamen Rider × Super Sentai × Space Sheriff: Super Hero Taisen Z	Rinko Daimon	
2013	Kamen Rider Wizard in Magic Land	Rinko Daimon/Kamen Rider Mage (voice)	
2013	Kamen Rider × Kamen Rider Gaim & Wizard: The Fateful Sengoku Movie Battle	Rinko Daimon	
2016	Kamen Rider Ghost: The 100 Eyecons and Ghost's Fated Moment	Jay/Kamen Rider Dark Necrom Y (voice)	
