= From Far Away =

Japanese manga series

- Cover of the first manga volume

彼方から (Kanata kara)
- Genre: Isekai; Romance; Supernatural
- Manga
- Written by: Kyoko Hikawa
- Published by: Hakusensha
- English publisher: NA: Viz Media
- Imprint: Hana to Yume Comics
- Magazine: LaLa
- Original run: September 24, 1991 – October 24, 2002
- Volumes: 14
- Anime television series
- Directed by: Noriyuki Abe
- Written by: Rika Takasugi
- Music by: Takeshi Hama
- Studio: Studio Deen
- Licensed by: Crunchyroll
- Original network: Tokyo MX
- Original run: October 5, 2026 – present
- Episodes: 5
- icon

From Far Away (Japanese: 彼方から, Hepburn: Kanata kara) is a Japanese manga series written and illustrated by Kyoko Hikawa. The manga was serialized in Hakusensha's shōjo manga magazine LaLa from September 1991 to October 2002 and collected in 14 tankōbon volumes. It is licensed in North America by Viz Media. The story follows a high-school girl who is sent to a medieval-like fantasy world after encountering an explosive paper bag. There, she meets a mysterious warrior, and the two are dragged in a conflict between nations seeking to control an all powerful dragon. An anime television series adaptation produced by Studio Deen premiered in October 2026.

== Story ==
Noriko, an ordinary schoolgirl, has slipped into a mysterious world of magic and flying dragons, which is in chaos due to the ancient foresaying of The Awakening. Every kingdom in the world is in search for the Awakening as they believe that it has the power to control the Sky Demon, the most destructive monster. Noriko meets Izark, the lonesome warrior, and accompanies him. Izark was born with a mysterious power that makes people hate him and causes him to travel alone. He came here in order to change his fate by trying to kill the Awakening only to find out that the Awakening is Noriko. As she travels with him, it's hard for them to talk as they speak different languages.

Izark realizes that Noriko knows nothing at all about her being the Awakening and can't leave her alone in the middle of nowhere. He decides to take her to his old and only friend Gaya. During the journey to Gaya's place, he is struck by a mysterious illness: the sign of his physical transformation to the Sky Demon, as he turns out to be the Sky Demon in human form. Noriko has no clue about his illness as well as his frustration with her, but tries her best to nurse him. Rachef, the young ruler of Rienka, sends his best warrior Keimos to search for the Awakening. Finally Keimos catches up with them, and he and Izark start to duel in which Izark won.

The story continues on about Izark and his transformations, and his growing love for clueless Noriko. Noriko also realizes her feelings for Izark and a battle between Light and Dark commences as Rachef, Leader of Rienka, tries to take over.

== Characters ==
=== Protagonists ===
Izark Kia Tarj (イザーク・キア・タージ, Izāku Kia Tāji)
Voiced by: Shin-ichiro Miki (drama CD), Kentarō Kumagai (anime)
A wandering swordsman who helps people in need (with payment, of course). He is the reincarnation of the greatest evil, the Sky Demon. He is much stronger than the average person. He can jump higher, run faster, and also summon fire and wind. Ever since he was small, Izark was shunned by his mother, who called him a monster and rejected having given birth to him, which in turn results in his insecurity about being the Sky Demon and does not easily trust others. Noriko was the first person to really open up to him, as she did not know of his being. He quickly comes to care for Noriko, and the feeling soon turns into undeniable love, but because he believes himself to be an abomination, he hides his feelings because he thinks he can only hurt Noriko.
Noriko Tachiki (立木 典子, Tachiki Noriko)
Voiced by: Masami Suzuki (drama CD), Tomoyo Kurosawa (anime)
High school student. She is an ordinary, slightly unconfident girl, who was transported to a strange world by a bomb explosion. Izark was the first person she met and taught her to speak his language. Noriko did not know that she was The Awakening, who was wanted by many countries. Many neighboring countries believed that by capturing The Awakening, they could also control the Sky Demon. Noriko falls in love with Izark quite early into the story.
Gaya il Biska (ガーヤ・イル・ビスカ, Gāya Iru Bisuka)
Voiced by: Ai Satō (drama CD), Kimiko Saitō (anime)
Izark's friend. In the past, she was a soldier of the Gray Bird tribe, which was forced to disband. She taught Izark swordplay, allowing him to control his inner demon better. Izark trusts Gaya to look after Noriko for a short period in the manga. She has a twin sister named Zena.
Barago (バラゴ)
Voiced by: Kunihiko Yasui (drama CD)
Initially a guardian of Lord Nada, whose primary source of entertainment is to gather strong men and make them fight. Barago is ordered by Lord Nada to fight Izark and gauge Izark's strength. Barago loses, and seeing the ills of his ways, became Izark's friend and helped Izark to escape from Zago. He likes to tease Izark and Noriko.
Jeida De Girene (ジェイダ・デ・ギレネー, Jeida De Girenē)
Voiced by: Yukitoshi Hori (drama CD)
An ex-leader who is persecuted for his opinions. He and his sons were jailed by Lord Nada and tries to escape from Zago. While hiding in Gaya's house, he and his sons, Rontarna and Koriki were caught by Zago's soldiers.
Agol Dena Ofa (アゴル・デナ・オーファ, Agoru Dena Ōfa)
Voiced by: Kenyu Horiuchi (drama CD), Taisuke Nakano (anime)
He became a mercenary soldier of Rienka in order to earn money to heal his daughter's blindness. He was ordered by Rachef to search for The Awakening. Noriko met him while trying to escape from miscreants. He suspected Noriko and Izark as The Awakening and the Sky Demon, respectively, but decided to leave Rachef and not turn them in.
Geena Haas (ジーナハース, Jīna Hāsu)
Voiced by: Sakura Tange (drama CD), Miku Itō (anime)
She is Agol's daughter. Although she is blind, she can see the future through her guardian stone, a precious item of her deceased mother. She is an exceptionally powerful Seer, despite the fact that she is a young girl. Her father had asked her to investigate Noriko and Izark's history, but the images Geena received were always unclear or frightening.
Irktule (イルクツーレ, Irukutsūre)
Voiced by: Hiroshi Kamiya (drama CD)
Known as Irk, he is the morning mist tree spirit, who asked for Noriko's help in restoring the forest where he lived. Then he and his villagers help Noriko and Izark in their journey. He usually can only be seen by Noriko.
Doros (ドロス, Dorosu)
Voiced by: Akimitsu Takase (drama CD)
A mistreated chimo breeder who works for Rachef. He realizes that he is deceived by Rachef and betrays Rachef, helping Noriko to escape. He keeps the two chimos that Rachef spared.

=== Antagonists ===
Keimos Lee Goda (ケイモス・リー・ゴーダ, Keimosu Rī Gōda)
Voiced by: Kazuhiko Inoue (drama CD), Eiji Takeuchi (anime)
Arrogant, but powerful swordsman. When he is defeated by Izark, his mind is consumed with revenge, as he cannot accept being inferior to any man. He would have been killed by Izark had Rachef not interfered and taken him out of the battle to safety. He accepts Rachef's help in making him stronger and uses moonstones to achieve this. Through the power of the darkness, he becomes a monster when fighting seriously, but in the end he is consumed by the same darkness and dies.
Rachef (ラチェフ, Rachefu)
Voiced by: Show Hayami (drama CD), Yūichirō Umehara (anime)
Leader of Rienka. When Keimos is defeated by Izark, Rachef brings Keimos to safety and grants Keimos power, enough to be considered Izark's equal. He has an incredibly dark childhood. He greatly resented his mother and purposefully killed her by pushing her off a flight of stairs. Witnesses to the event believe that it was an accident. Tazasheena reminds him of his mother and therefore, Rachef dislikes her, as well.
Tazasheena (タザシーナ, Tazashīna)
Voiced by: Emi Shinohara (drama CD)
A beautiful but wicked woman who replaces Zena as Mokumen's prophetess. She betrays Mokumen as its appearance disgusts her. She wants to live a life of luxury by Rachef's side. She does not like to be ignored or put down by Rachef and his Seer. Noriko learns that she is The Awakening from Tazasheena.
Goriya (ゴーリヤ, Gōriya)
Voiced by: Masaharu Satō (drama CD), Tadashi Miyazawa (anime)
Rachef's prophet who discovers that Izark and Noriko are the Sky Demon and Awakening

== Media ==
=== Manga ===
Written and illustrated by Kyoko Hikawa, the manga was serialized in Hakusensha's shōjo manga magazine LaLa from September 24, 1991, to October 24, 2002. Its chapters were compiled into 14 tankōbon volumes released under the Hana to Yume Comics imprint from December 11, 1992, to April 5, 2003.

In September 2004, Viz Media announced that it had licensed the series for English-language publication. The volumes were released from November 10, 2004, to January 9, 2007.

No.	Original release date	Original ISBN	North American release date	North American ISBN
1	December 11, 1992	4-592-12351-4	November 10, 2004	978-1-59116-599-6
2	February 19, 1993	4-592-12352-2	January 11, 2005	978-1-59116-601-6
3	May 19, 1993	4-592-12353-0	March 8, 2005	978-1-59116-603-0
4	November 19, 1993	4-592-12354-9	May 10, 2005	978-1-59116-770-9
5	February 17, 1995	4-592-12355-7	July 12, 2005	978-1-59116-835-5
6	February 5, 1996	4-592-12356-5	September 6, 2005	978-1-59116-972-7
7	October 5, 1996	4-592-12357-3	November 8, 2005	978-1-4215-0088-1
8	January 7, 1998	4-592-12358-1	January 10, 2006	978-1-4215-0220-5
9	December 5, 1998	4-592-12359-X	March 14, 2006	978-1-4215-0322-6
10	December 4, 1999	4-592-12360-3	May 9, 2006	978-1-4215-0537-4
11	November 4, 2000	4-592-17541-7	July 11, 2006	978-1-4215-0538-1
12	September 5, 2001	4-592-17542-5	September 12, 2006	978-1-4215-0539-8
13	August 5, 2002	4-592-17543-3	November 14, 2006	978-1-4215-0540-4
14	April 5, 2003	4-592-17544-1	January 9, 2007	978-1-4215-0541-1

=== Anime ===
An anime television series adaptation was announced on March 18, 2026. It will be produced by Studio Deen and directed by Noriyuki Abe, with series composition handled by Rika Takasugi, characters designed by Eiji Abiko, and music composed by Takeshi Hama. The series premiered on Tokyo MX on October 5, 2026. Genin wa Jibun ni Aru will perform the opening theme song "Tōkōkō" (逃光行), and Nanashi no Tarō will perform the ending theme song "Hikari no Gawa de" (光の側で; 'At the Side of Light'). Crunchyroll is streaming the series.

== Reception ==
In 2004, the manga won the 35th annual Seiun Award for best science fiction comic. By March 2026, the series had over four million copies in circulation.
