= The Marshmallow Times =

Japanese manga series

マシュマロ通信 (Mashumaro Taimusu)
- Genre: Comedy
- Manga
- Written by: Lunlun Yamamoto
- Published by: Asahi Gakusei Shimbun
- Magazine: Asahi Shōgakusei Shimbun; Asahi Chūgakusei Weekly
- Original run: January 2004 – January 2006
- Volumes: 9
- Anime television series
- Directed by: Hiroshi Fukutomi; Seung Il Lee
- Produced by: Eiji Kaneoka (TV Osaka); Kazuya Watanabe (Yomiko Advertising); Hideyuki Kachi (We've); Jeong Hun Song
- Written by: Rika Nakase
- Music by: Satoru Miwa
- Studio: Studio Comet; Seoul Movie
- Original network: TXN (TV Osaka)
- Original run: April 4, 2004 – March 27, 2005
- Episodes: 52

The Marshmallow Times (マシュマロ通信, Mashumaro Taimusu) is a manga by Lunlun Yamamoto. It was first published from 2004 to 2006 in the magazines Asahi Shōgakusei Shimbun and Asahi Chūgakusei Weekly (Asahi Shimbun group), and subsequently adapted into anime series directed by Hiroshi Fukutomi and Seung Il Lee, with Rika Nakase writing the scripts, Hiroshi Kanazawa and Ji Woon Ha designing the characters and Satoru Miwa composing the music. Consisting of a total 52 episodes, the series was broadcast every Sunday from April 4, 2004, until March 27, 2005, on the TV Osaka and the TX Network in Japan.

The series focuses on seven children and a sheep-like character who hang out together and work as a team. Each character is depicted with a varying hairstyle and flavor of fashion.

== Plot ==
Sandy, a girl who lives in Marshmallow Town, whose pet is a sheep-like creature named Cloud, and 6 other children—Jasmine, Lime, Basil, Clove, Nuts and Cinnamon—become friends and form a journalism team and adventure their world together.

== Characters ==
=== Main characters ===
Sandy (サンディ, Sandi)
Voiced by: Misato Fukuen
A girl with orange braided hair who lives with her mother, father and twin brothers. Sandy is a tomboy who is extremely dedicated to her role as editor-in-chief of the Marshmallow Times. Although she can be smart and hard-working, she can also be quite stubborn and has a habit of taking her friends and family for granted, though she does care about them deep down, even if she's not the best at showing it.
Jasmine (ジャスミン, Jasumin)
Voiced by: Kana Ueda
A pink-haired girl with flowers in her hair and the most popular girl in town. She is obsessed with being "beautiful" and follows a strict training regimen in order to maintain her looks.
Lime (ライム, Raimu)
Voiced by: Kenji Nojima
A green-haired boy. He loves to flirt with girls and is constantly going on dates. While most girls find him fun to hang out with, they also see him as too much of a "show-off" for them to consider a serious relationship with him.
Basil (バジル, Bajiru)
Voiced by: Akiko Kobayashi
A yellow-haired girl who is usually seen with a camera. She is very cheerful and is always looking for "scoops" to photograph. However, due to her poor photography skills, her pictures almost always come out blurry. Because of this, as well as her general disregard for people's privacy, Sandy does not consider her an official member of the Marshmallow Times.
Clove (クローブ, Kurōbu)
Voiced by: Takayuki Yamaguchi
A blue-haired boy who always wears headphones. He loves computers and has a stereo in his room. He mostly wears striped clothes.
Nuts (ナッツ, Nattsu)
Voiced by: Nobuo Tobita
A black-haired boy who has hair covering his eyes. He usually wears a bandanna on his head. He owns a vegetable garden and is a gardener.
Cinnamon (シナモン, Shinamon)
Voiced by: Nobuko Sakuma
A light-blue-haired girl. She has a passion for fortune-telling and will often try to use her crystal ball to predict the outcome of events, though her predictions vary in accuracy.
Cloud (クラウド, Kuraudo)
Voiced by: Reiko Takagi
A living doll based on Sheep Cloud, the mascot of Cloud Cereal. Sandy won the "Wake-Up Cloud" doll in a contest, only for him to mysteriously come to life. Shortly after, he was accepted into Sandy's family. Cloud behaves similarly to a young child in that he's innocent, cheerful and eager to help others. His extreme optimism and desire to be "useful" often gets him into trouble, as he has a bad habit of biting off more than he can chew, much to the ire of his adoptive sister Sandy.

=== Minor characters ===
Sandy's Family
The people that live with Sandy. Her mother is a sweet and caring woman. Her father is much shorter

== Episodes ==
No.	Title	Directed by	Written by	Original release date
1	"Cloud Is Here!"; Transliteration: "Kuraudo ga yattekita!" (Japanese: クラウドがやってきた！)	Hiroshi Fukutomi; Seung Il Lee	Rika Nakase	April 4, 2004
2	"First Errand!"; Transliteration: "Hajimete no otsukai!" (Japanese: 初めてのおつかい！)	Hiroshi Harada; Wang Yeb Kim	Kiyoko Yoshimura	April 11, 2004
3	"Terror! Doppelganger!"; Transliteration: "Kyōfu! Dopperugengā!" (Japanese: 恐怖！ドッペルゲンガー！！)	Makoto Moriwaki; Seung Il Lee	Yōichirō Hayama	April 18, 2004
4	"Nuts's Flower Movement?"; Transliteration: "Nattsu no furawā mūbumento?" (Japanese: ナッツのフラワームーブメント？)	Masayuki Iimura; Woo Yong Jung	Kuniaki Kasahara	April 25, 2004
5	"Basil's Scoop?"; Transliteration: "Bajiru no sukūpu?" (Japanese: バジルのスクープ？)	Jōhei Matsuura; Seung Il Lee	Masahiro Yokotani	May 2, 2004
6	"Jasmine's Secret"; Transliteration: "Jasumin no himitsu" (Japanese: ジャスミンの秘密)	Masayuki Iimura; Wang Yeb Kim	Rika Nakase	May 9, 2004
7	"Cinnamon Into Fortune-Telling?"; Transliteration: "Shinamon wa uranai ni muchū?" (Japanese: シナモンは占いに夢中？)	Makoto Moriwaki; Seung Il Lee	Kiyoko Yoshimura	May 16, 2004
8	"Snail, the Symbol of the City"; Transliteration: "Machi no shinboru, Suneiru-kun" (Japanese: 街のシンボル、スネイルくん)	Hiroshi Ishiodori; Woo Yong Jung	Kuniaki Kasahara	May 23, 2004
9	"Lime's First Love"; Transliteration: "Raimu no hatsukoi" (Japanese: ライムの初恋)	Makoto Moriwaki; Seung Il Lee	Yōichirō Hayama	May 30, 2004
10	"Clove Is a Music Producer"; Transliteration: "Kurōbu wa ongaku purodyūsā" (Japanese: クローブは音楽プロデューサー)	Masayuki Iimura; Wang Yeb Kim	Kuniaki Kasahara	June 6, 2004
11	"Dad About to Be Laid Off?"; Transliteration: "Papa, risutora no kiki?" (Japanese: パパ、リストラの危機？)	Takaomi Kanasaki; Seung Il Lee	Kiyoko Yoshimura	June 13, 2004
12	"Sandy Is Cursed?!"; Transliteration: "Sandi, norowareru!?" (Japanese: サンディ、呪われる！？)	Jōhei Matsuura; Woo Yong Jung	Masahiro Yokotani	June 20, 2004
13	"Sunny Under the Rain"; Transliteration: "Doshaburi Sanī-san" (Japanese: どしゃ降りサニーさん)	Hisaya Takabayashi; Seung Il Lee	Rika Nakase	June 27, 2004
14	"Find Miss Marshmallow!"; Transliteration: "Misu Mashumaro o sagase!" (Japanese: ミス・マシュマロをさがせ！)	Makoto Moriwaki; Wang Yeb Kim	Yōichirō Hayama	July 4, 2004
15	"Devil Angelica"; Transliteration: "Akuma no Anjerika" (Japanese: 悪魔のアンジェリカ)	Akira Shimizu; Seung Il Lee	Michiko Yokote	July 11, 2004
16	"Operation Test"; Transliteration: "Tesuto daisakusen" (Japanese: テスト大作戦)	Masayuki Iimura; Woo Yong Jung	Kiyoko Yoshimura	July 18, 2004
17	"Donut Wars!"; Transliteration: "Dōnattsu wōzu!" (Japanese: ドーナッツ戦争(ウォーズ)！)	Jōhei Matsuura; Seung Il Lee	Kuniaki Kasahara	July 25, 2004
18	"Let's Go Camping!"; Transliteration: "Go! Go! Kyanpu!" (Japanese: GO！GO！キャンプ！)	Hisaya Takabayashi; Wang Yeb Kim	Rika Nakase	August 1, 2004
19	"Lime's Love, Part 2"; Transliteration: "Raimu no koi PART II" (Japanese: ライムの恋 PARTII)	Makoto Moriwaki; Seung Il Lee	Masahiro Yokotani	August 8, 2004
20	"Midsummer Dream Tour"; Transliteration: "Manatsu no dorīmu tsuā" (Japanese: 真夏のドリームツアー)	Akira Shimizu; Woo Yong Jung	Kiyoko Yoshimura	August 15, 2004
21	"The Secret Rabbit Dog"; Transliteration: "Himitsu no usagi inu" (Japanese: ひみつのウサギイヌ)	Takaomi Kanasaki; Seung Il Lee	Kuniaki Kasahara	August 22, 2004
22	"Cloud Runs Away"; Transliteration: "Kuraudo, iede suru" (Japanese: クラウド、家出する)	Makoto Moriwaki; Wang Yeb Kim	Kiyoko Yoshimura	August 29, 2004
23	"Mysterious Space Family"; Transliteration: "Nazo no supēsu famirī" (Japanese: 謎のスペース・ファミリー)	Hisaya Takabayashi; Seung Il Lee	Michiko Yokote	September 5, 2004
24	"Cinnamon Is a Witch?!"; Transliteration: "Shinamon wa majo!?" (Japanese: シナモンは魔女！？)	Jōhei Matsuura; Woo Yong Jung	Rika Nakase	September 12, 2004
25	"Ghost Stories From the Academy"; Transliteration: "Gakuin no kaidan" (Japanese: 学院の怪談)	Akira Shimizu; Seung Il Lee	Yōichirō Hayama	September 19, 2004
26	"Farewell, Marshmallow Times?!"; Transliteration: "Sayonara, Mashumaro Taimusu!?" (Japanese: さよなら、マシュマロ通信！？)	Takaomi Kanasaki; Wang Yeb Kim	Kuniaki Kasahara	September 26, 2004
27	"Leave It to Marshmallow Times"; Transliteration: "Mashumaro Taimusu ni omakase" (Japanese: マシュマロ通信(タイムス)におまかせ)	Makoto Moriwaki; Seung Il Lee	Rika Nakase	October 3, 2004
28	"Cloud Drawing"; Transliteration: "Oekaki Kuraudo" (Japanese: お絵かきクラウド)	Jōhei Matsuura; Woo Yong Jung	Kiyoko Yoshimura	October 10, 2004
29	"Crazy, Crazy Race"; Transliteration: "Okashina okashina mōrēsu" (Japanese: おかしなおかしな猛レース)	Hisaya Takabayashi; Seung Il Lee	Masahiro Yokotani	October 17, 2004
30	"Halloween in Marshmallow Town!"; Transliteration: "Mashumaro Taun no Harowīn!" (Japanese: マシュマロタウンのハロウィーン！)	Hisaya Takabayashi; Wang Yeb Kim	Michiko Yokote	October 24, 2004
31	"I Turned Into Sandy?!"; Transliteration: "Sandi ni natchatta!?" (Japanese: サンディになっちゃった！？)	Makoto Moriwaki; Seung Il Lee	Yōichirō Hayama	October 31, 2004
32	"Pansy Is Here!"; Transliteration: "Panjī ga yattekita" (Japanese: パンジーがやってきた)	Makoto Moriwaki; Woo Yong Jung	Kuniaki Kasahara	November 7, 2004
33	"Nervous Basil"; Transliteration: "Tokimeki Bajiru" (Japanese: ときめきバジル)	Jōhei Matsuura; Seung Il Lee	Masahiro Yokotani	November 14, 2004
34	"Cloud House-Sitting"; Transliteration: "Kuraudo no orusuban" (Japanese: クラウドのおるすばん)	Makoto Moriwaki; Wang Yeb Kim	Kiyoko Yoshimura	November 21, 2004
35	"It's Pansy!"; Transliteration: "Panjī yanen!" (Japanese: パンジーやねん！)	Takaomi Kanasaki; Seung Il Lee	Rika Nakase	November 28, 2004
36	"Escape From the Department Store!"; Transliteration: "Depāto o dasshutsu seyo!" (Japanese: デパートを脱出せよ！)	Hisaya Takabayashi; Woo Yong Jung	Akatsuki Yamatoya	December 5, 2004
37	"Christmas in Wonderland"; Transliteration: "Fushigi no kuni no Kurisumasu" (Japanese: 不思議の国のクリスマス)	Hiroshi Fukutomi; Seung Il Lee	Hiroshi Fukutomi	December 12, 2004
38	"Back to the Proposal"; Transliteration: "Bakku tu za puropōzu" (Japanese: バック・トゥ・ザ・プロポーズ)	Makoto Moriwaki; Wang Yeb Kim	Masahiro Yokotani	December 19, 2004
39	"Dark Cloud Descends!"; Transliteration: "Dāku Kuraudo kōrin!" (Japanese: ダーク・クラウド降臨！)	Jōhei Matsuura; Seung Il Lee	Yōichirō Hayama	December 26, 2004
40	"Angelica's First Love?"; Transliteration: "Anjerika no hatsukoi?" (Japanese: アンジェリカの初恋？)	Makoto Moriwaki; Woo Yong Jung	Natsuko Takahashi	January 2, 2005
41	"So Many Principals?!"; Transliteration: "Kōchō sensei ga ippai!?" (Japanese: 校長先生がいっぱい！？)	Kiyoshi Egami; Seung Il Lee	Kuniaki Kasahara	January 9, 2005
42	"Lime's Longest Day"; Transliteration: "Raimu no ichiban nagai hi" (Japanese: ライムの一番長い日)	Takaomi Kanasaki; Wang Yeb Kim	Kiyoko Yoshimura	January 16, 2005
43	"Marshmallow Town's Day Off"; Transliteration: "Mashumaro Taun no kyūjitsu" (Japanese: マシュマロタウンの休日)	Hisaya Takabayashi; Seung Il Lee	Masahiro Yokotani	January 23, 2005
44	"Cloud and the Snow Fairy"; Transliteration: "Kuraudo to yuki no yōsei" (Japanese: クラウドと雪の妖精)	Makoto Moriwaki; Woo Yong Jung	Kiyoko Yoshimura	January 30, 2005
45	"Assault! The Billionaire Next Door"; Transliteration: "Totsugeki! Tonari no okumanchōja" (Japanese: 突撃！となりの億万長者)	Jōhei Matsuura; Seung Il Lee	Akatsuki Yamatoya	February 6, 2005
46	"Welcome to the Forest."; Transliteration: "Mori e irasshai." (Japanese: 森へいらっしゃい。)	Yasuo Ejima; Wang Yeb Kim	Kiyoko Yoshimura	February 13, 2005
47	"Run, Sandy!"; Transliteration: "Hashire! Sandi!!" (Japanese: 走れ！サンディ！！)	Kazuo Yamada; Seung Il Lee	Michiko Yokote	February 20, 2005
48	"My Jasmine"; Transliteration: "Watashi no Jasumin" (Japanese: 私のジャスミン)	Kiyoshi Egami; Woo Yong Jung	Natsuko Takahashi	February 27, 2005
49	"Graceful Basil"; Transliteration: "Shitoyaka Bajiru" (Japanese: しとやかバジル)	Hisaya Takabayashi; Seung Il Lee	Kuniaki Kasahara	March 6, 2005
50	"Operation Hospital Visit!"; Transliteration: "Omimai daisakusen!" (Japanese: お見舞い大作戦！)	Jōhei Matsuura; Wang Yeb Kim	Akatsuki Yamatoya	March 13, 2005
51	"Good Night, Cloud"; Transliteration: "Oyasumi Kuraudo" (Japanese: おやすみクラウド)	Takaomi Kanasaki; Seung Il Lee	Masahiro Yokotani	March 20, 2005
52	"Let's Ring the Bell of Happiness"; Transliteration: "Shiawase no kane o narasou" (Japanese: 幸せの鐘を鳴らそう)	Hiroshi Fukutomi; Woo Yong Jung	Rika Nakase	March 27, 2005
