= Mutant Girls Squad =

- Film poster
- Directed by: Noboru Iguchi; Yoshihiro Nishimura; Tak Sakaguchi
- Written by: Noboru Iguchi; Jun Tsugita
- Produced by: Yoshinori Chiba; Toshiki Kimura; Gen Satō
- Starring: Yumi Sugimoto; Yuko Takayama; Suzuka Morita; Naoto Takenaka; Chiharu Kawa
- Cinematography: Shu G. Momose
- Edited by: Tsuyoshi Wada
- Music by: Takashi Nakagawa
- Production company: Nikkatsu
- Distributed by: Toei
- Release date: May 22, 2010 (Japan)
- Running time: 85 minutes
- Country: Japan
- Language: Japanese

Mutant Girls Squad (Japanese: 戦闘少女 血の鉄仮面伝説, Hepburn: Sentō Shōjo: Chi no Tekkamen Densetsu; literally translated as "Fighting Girls: Legend of the Blood of the Iron Mask") is a Japanese film by Noboru Iguchi, Yoshihiro Nishimura and Tak Sakaguchi. The film is about Rin, a sixteen-year-old mutant girl who meets a gang of rebel mutants who aim to take revenge on humans for persecuting their race. The film had its international premiere at the New York Asian Film Festival in 2010. Most of the actors and actresses later went on to star in Super Sentai and Kamen Rider shows.

== Plot ==
Rin (Yumi Sugimoto) is an unassuming and awkward high school student who is bullied at school. One day, while being bullied, she feels a sharp pain in her hand. Later, Rin learns that she is a descendant of the ancient Hiruko clan, whose members are mutants gifted with superpowers. A group of anti-Hiruko soldiers raids her home and kills her parents, while Rin barely escapes.

After killing an entire shopping district out of misunderstanding and grief-fueled rage, Rin meets Rei (Yuko Takayama), another mutant. Rei introduces Rin to a small rag-tag group of mutant rebels led by a transvestite samurai named Kisaragi (Tak Sakaguchi), who is bent on restoring the Hiruko clan.

Under the instructions of Kisaragi and Rei, Rin wears an iron mask until she can control her powers and begins training. The tentacle-armed Yoshie (Suzuka Morita) tells Rin about Rei's past. Until three years ago, Rei had been a freak at a circus, with the only person to show her compassion and acceptance being a boy who gave her a gold cross necklace. When the townsfolk killed the boy for loving her, Rei's hatred for humans was born. Rin later finds the necklace after Rei accidentally drops it after a training session.

When Rin achieves control over her powers much sooner than Kisaragi had expected, he orders her, along with Yoshie, to infiltrate an anti-Hiruko conference and attack a high-ranking general named Koshimizu. Rin and Yoshie successfully take out Koshimizu but are unwilling to kill innocent surviving humans. Rei, under Kisaragi's orders, kills the survivors.

Eventually, Rin realizes that, in spite of everything that has happened, she cannot turn against her human side. She persuades Yoshie to join in her cause to protect innocent humans rather than kill or subjugate them. Meanwhile, other Hiruko schoolgirls are being brainwashed to carry out suicide bomb attacks at various locations to kill humans. Kisaragi kidnaps and drains the blood of the fervently anti-Hiruko prime minister, which grants him a grotesque super-powered body. Yoshie takes on the brainwashed mutant schoolgirls while Rin faces off against Rei. Rin returns Rei's treasured gold cross necklace and triggers fond memories of the human boy who loved her. With it Rin convinces Rei to stop her war on humans.

Rin, Rei, and Yoshie team up to defeat Kisaragi and rescue the prime minister. However, after the man insults them, the three girls kill him as the credits roll.

== Cast ==
- Yumi Sugimoto as Rin
- Yuko Takayama as Rei
- Suzuka Morita as Yoshie
- Kanji Tsuda as Rin's father
- Maiko Ito as Sayuri, Rin's mother
- Tak Sakaguchi as Kisaragi
- Asami Sugiura as Female samurai with eyepatch
- Hikaru Shida as Nonoko
- Kentarō Shimazu as Nonagase
- Naoto Takenaka as Defence Minister Koshimizu Hiroaki
- Miyu Wagawa as Tadokoro Mina
- Rie Hayasaka as Sumire
- Naoi Nagano as Chiako
- Cay Izumi as Sachie
- Maki Mizui as Astro-mutant

== Production ==
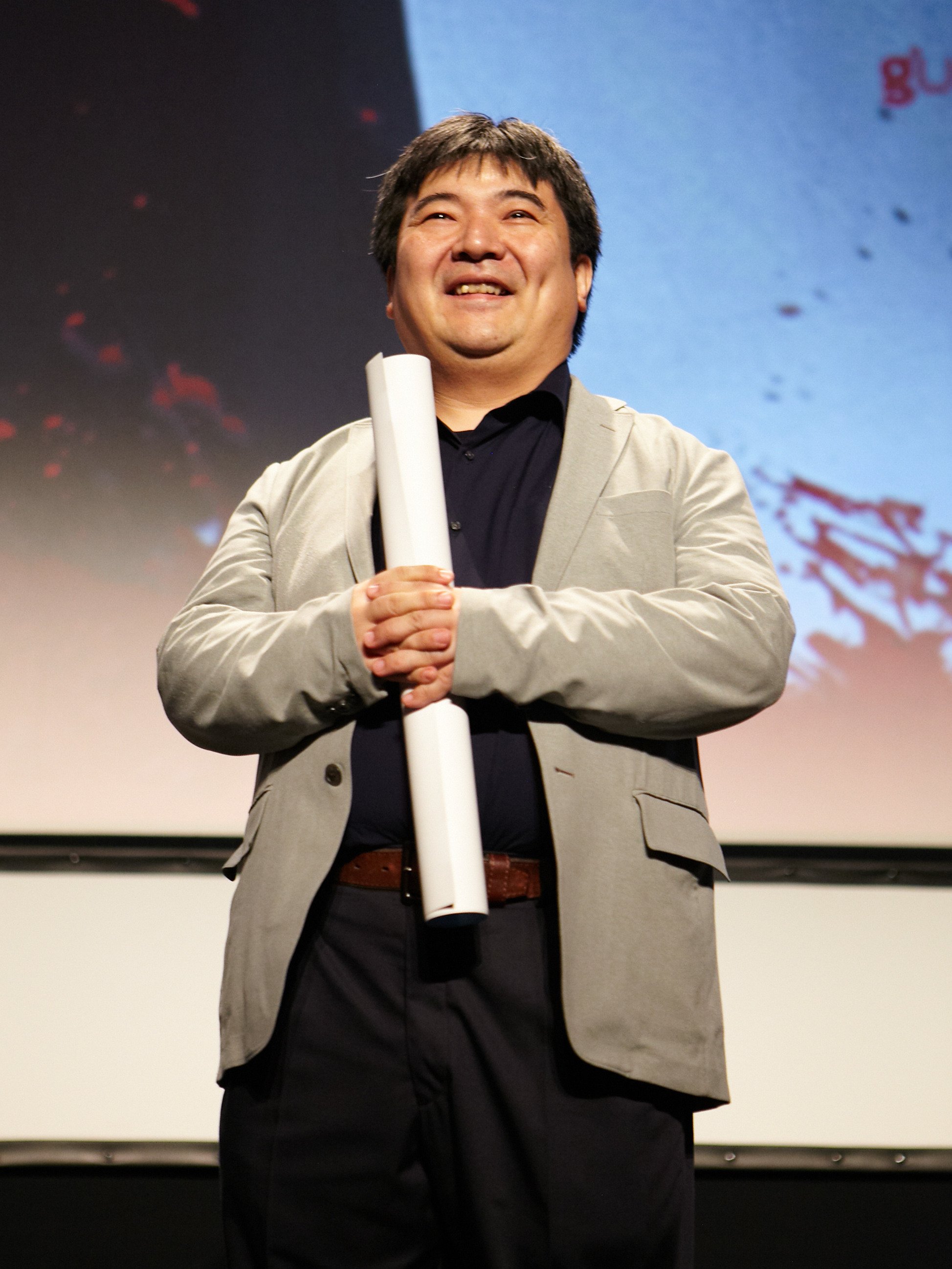
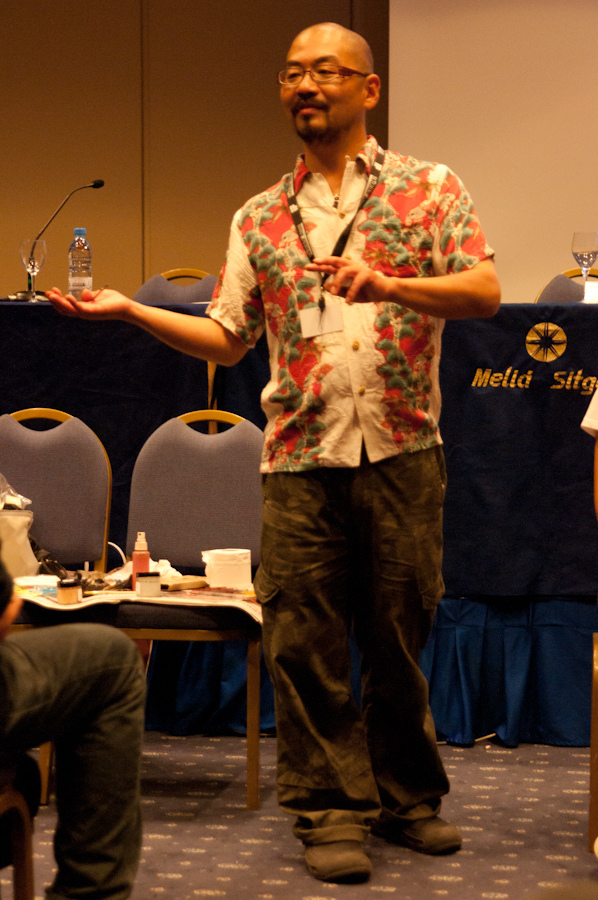
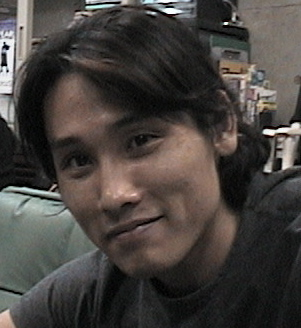
The three directors of Mutant Girl Squad. From left to right: Noboru Iguchi, Yoshihiro Nishimura, and Tak Sakaguchi.

At the 2009 New York Asian Film Festival, directors Noboru Iguchi, Yoshihiro Nishimura and Tak Sakaguchi met and agreed to make a film together. Each director directed one third of the film with Sakaguchi directing the first part, Iguchi the second and Nishimura the third. A year later they finished work on Mutant Girls Squad.

For the Japanese DVD release of the film, Noboru Iguchi created a short prequel film titled Yoshie Zero that focuses on Suzuka Morita's character.

== Release ==
Mutant Girls Squad was the second film to go into production, but the first to be released from Nikkatsu's cult film label Sushi Typhoon. The film was first shown in Japan on May 22, 2010. The film had its American premiere at the New York Asian Film Festival on July 3, 2010. Its Canadian premiere was at the Fantasia Festival on July 10, 2010. At the Sitges Film Festival, Mutant Girls Squad won the award for Best Motion Picture in the Midnight X-Treme section.

== Reception ==
Fangoria gave the film a positive rating of three out of four, calling the film "a must-see just for the experience, and those audiences who do find themselves reveling in its madness will find a flick they’ll happily revisit." Twitch Film gave a positive review, saying that "The film features ridiculous, completely over the top and borderline offensive content that may not be for everybody" and "Mutant Girls Squad may feel a little too familiar, but fortunately there are enough unique comedic elements scattered throughout the film that make it still totally enjoyable." Variety gave the film a positive review, praising the directors as filmmakers who "execute a virtually nonstop exhibition of over-the-top violence with considerable creativity and visual flair.". The review went on to praise screenwriter Jun Tsugita who included a "wealth of zingy lines" and the actors "Sugimoto, Takayama and Morita credibly negotiate the dialogue and show plenty of zest while lopping the limbs off all comers" A review in The Montreal Gazette said he could not "assign a rating to Mutant Girls Squad...if you like this sort of extreme, gonzo gore then you'll be pleased with the carnival of tongue-in-cheek, perverted horrors on display here. If not, you'll probably dismiss it as Grand Guignol put on in a reform school, before you throw up." Film Business Asia gave the film a seven out of ten rating, describing the film as being both part of and a parody of its genre and that if the film "is remembered for anything, it will be for the character of a girl who can produce a chainsaw from her arse."
