= Takayuki Yamaguchi (voice actor) =

Japanese voice actor (born 1975)

- Born: 28 December 1975 (age 50); Chiba Prefecture, Japan
- Occupation: Voice actor
- Years active: 1998–present

Takayuki Yamaguchi (山口 隆行, Yamaguchi Takayuki; born 28 December 1975 in Chiba) is a Japanese voice actor who works for 81 Produce. 2022

== Notable voice roles ==
- Avenger (TV)
- Bakuman. (TV 3) as Mamoru Tamiya; Manager (ep 23)
- Battle Spirits: Shōnen Toppa Bashin (TV) as Man (ep 12)
- Cardfight!! Vanguard (TV) as Yūta Izaki
- Cardfight!! Vanguard: Asia Circuit Hen (TV) as Yūta Izaki
- Cardfight!! Vanguard: Legion Mate-Hen (TV) as Yūta Izaki
- Cardfight!! Vanguard: Link Joker Hen (TV) as Yūta Izaki
- D.Gray-man (TV) as Cheetah (ep 32)
- Dual! Parallel Trouble Adventure (TV) as Kazuki Yotsuga
- Dual! Parallel Trouble Adventures Special as Kazuki Yotsuga
- Early Reins (OAV) as Assistant Engineer; Henchman
- G-Saviour (live-action TV movie) as Computer
- Gekito! Crush Gear Turbo (TV) as Shinomiya Rai
- Glass Mask (TV 2/2005) as Hiroshi Yoshizawa (ep 30)
- Golgo 13 (TV) as Marty's man (ep 4)
- .hack//Legend of the Twilight (TV) as Tom
- Hanaukyo Maid-tai (TV) as exercise dept. A (ep 6); host B (ep 4); male student B (ep 2); man C (ep 5)
- Hanaukyo Maid-tai OAV as bear (ep 2); student (ep 1); subordinate (ep 3)
- Hand Maid May (TV) as Kazuya Saotome
- Hikaru no Go (TV) as Chinese Pro (ep 67); Ryo Iijima
- His and Her Circumstances (TV) as Leader of Kento team; Male Student (ep 2); Yoshida (ep 5)
- Initial D: Fourth Stage (TV) as Todo Student (ep 3)
- Kaikan Phrase (TV) as Lucy May member (eps 2, 37); Shin-chan (ep 40)
- Kure-nai (OAV) as Criminal 1 (OVA 1)
- Kurenai (TV) as Man 2 (ep 1); Student C (ep 3)
- Maburaho (TV) as Male Student; Takashi Yamaguchi
- Magical Warfare (TV) as Makoto Hitouji
- (The) Marshmallow Times (TV) as Clove
- Massugu ni Ikō (TV) as Student (ep 1)
- Nagasarete Airantou (TV) as Teruteru Machou (Machi's shikigami; eps 12, 20, 24)
- Ojamajo Doremi Na-i-sho (OAV) as Manabu Takagi
- Panyo Panyo Di Gi Charat (TV) as Conceited Man
- Parappa the Rapper (TV) as Hockey Player (ep 26); Voice on the Phone (ep 20)
- Petite Princess Yucie (TV) as Arc
- Pokémon (TV) as Boat driver (ep 192); Toy shop employee (ep 138)
- Pokémon Chronicles (TV) as Jubei (ep 12)
- Restol, The Special Rescue Squad (Korean TV) as Kang Maru
- Samurai Deeper Kyo (TV) as Shindara
- Starship Operators (TV) as Taishi Kase
- Steel Angel Kurumi (TV) as Townsperson (ep 9)
- Strawberry Eggs (TV) as Kyousuke Aoki
- Tokyo Underground (TV) as Raichi
- Zoids: Fuzors (TV) as Malloy
- Tom in .hack//Legend Of The Twilight
- Kazuki Yotsuga in Dual! Parallel Trouble Adventure
- Leonhart (Leon) in Final Fantasy II (PlayStation version)
- Brother, Clasko, Keepa, and Wantz in Final Fantasy X
- Brother and Clasko in Final Fantasy X-2
- Potato-kun in Hamtaro
- Kazuya Saotome in Hand Maid May
- Takashi Yamaguchi in Maburaho
- Arc in Petite Princess Yucie
- Kang Maru in RESTOL, The Special Rescue Squad
- Kyousuke Aoki in Strawberry Eggs
- Clove in The Marshmallow Times
- Shindara in Samurai Deeper Kyo

== Dubbing ==
- Bob the Builder as Muck
- CatDog as Lube Catfield McDog
