= List of Twin Spica characters =

Main characters of the Twin Spica manga (clockwise from top right): Asumi Kamogawa, Mr. Lion, Shinnosuke Fuchuya, Shu Suzuki, Marika Ukita, and Kei Oumi.

Twin Spica (ふたつのスピカ, Futatsu no Supika) is a Japanese manga, anime, and live-action television series which features a cast of six main characters and numerous other supporting characters.

== Main characters ==
=== Asumi Kamogawa ===
Asumi Kamogawa (鴨川 アスミ, Kamogawa Asumi) is the story's main character. After her mother died when she was young, she grew up with her father. She is the only one who can see Mr. Lion, whom she met soon after her mother's death. After meeting Mr. Lion, she becomes resourceful and determined to become an astronaut. When her name is written in kanji (her name is in katakana), asu means "tomorrow" (or in this case "future") and mi means "look". She is very dedicated to her friends, willing to risk her life to help them. She also seems to enjoy making new friends and making others happy, even those who she has not yet considered her friends, seeing how she offered for Mr. Lion to ride in her rocket when she grew up(even before she officially knew him), and wanted to give one of her eyes to the blind, bandaged woman she met in the spirit world(even though she did know that it was her mother but unable to tell her real name on instructions from lion san to not tell her real name in spirit world). To sum it up, Asumi is kind, resourceful, loyal, and likable.

Asumi Kamogawa is voiced by actress Akiko Yajima in the anime series and is portrayed by actress Nanami Sakuraba in the live-action adaptation.

=== Mr. Lion ===
Mr. Lion (ライオンさん, Raion-san) meets Asumi when she is young and introduces himself as a ghost. He wears a large lion mask that covers his entire head. He comforts Asumi during the difficult time after her mother's death, and fosters her interest in space. He had a relationship with Asumi's elementary teacher, Yuko Suzunari and gave her a small lion doll with a wedding ring inside before he died. His real name is Takano. In the anime, he has a degree of memory loss, only by the end of the series does he regain part of it. He has only minor supernatural abilities, such as jumping high. He does fatigue himself like a normal living human. His missing memories include a brief relationship as a child with the "first" Marika Ukita. At the end of the anime series, Mr. Lion plays his harmonica which Asumi's friends are able to hear. They witness Mr. Lion as he removes his lion mask and wishes Asumi goodbye, leaving his harmonica behind for her.

Mr. Lion is voiced by actor Takehito Koyasu in the anime series; he does not appear in the live-action adaptation.

=== Shinnosuke Fuchuya ===
Shinnosuke Fuchuya (府中野 新之介, Fuchūya Shinnosuke) is Asumi's childhood friend who ends up following her to take the astronaut course. He likes Asumi and always looks after her but hasn't really revealed his feelings to her. His friends refer to him by family name only. He also responds to the nickname Fucchī (ふっちー) given to him by Kei.

Shinnosuke Fuchuya is voiced by actor Toshiyuki Toyonaga in the anime series and is portrayed by actor Shunsuke Daito in the live-action adaptation.

=== Shu Suzuki ===
Shu Suzuki (鈴木 秋, Suzuki Shū) is the top student of their course. He is often depicted as a laid-back, easy going guy. Despite the facade, he tries his best to reach for his dream—to become an astronaut. His friends refer to him simply as Shu (シュウ). At the end of the series, we can conclude that he is "Mr. Bunny."

Shu Suzuki is voiced by actress Yuki Kaida in the anime series and is portrayed by actor Yuichi Nakamura in the live-action adaptation.

=== Kei Oumi ===
Kei Oumi (近江 圭, Ōmi Kei) is the first girl Asumi meets during the Space School entrance exam. Sociable, gregarious and frank, she is Asumi's first female friend in the astronaut course.

Kei Oumi is voiced by actress Fuyuka Oura in the anime series and is portrayed by actress Yuko Takayama in the live-action adaptation.

=== Marika Ukita ===
Marika Ukita (宇喜多 万里香, Ukita Marika) is a classmate of Asumi's who is portrayed as a loner and generally treats her peers coldly. She justifies her attitude by reflecting on the difficult childhood she endured, which consisted mostly of studying in isolation. In the manga and the anime, Marika is in a bad relationship with her controlling father, trying to make her act like the "first" Marika Ukita. Marika also suffers from an illness which she hides from the others.

Marika Ukita is voiced by actress Akiko Kimura in the anime series and is portrayed by actress Rika Adachi in the live-action adaptation.

== Supporting characters ==
=== Tomorō Kamogawa ===
Tomorō Kamogawa (鴨川 友朗, Kamogawa Tomorō) is Asumi's father.

Tomorō Kamogawa is voiced by actor Ken'yū Horiuchi in the anime series and is portrayed by actor Masahiro Takashima in the live-action adaptation.

=== Takahito Sano ===
Takahito Sano (佐野 貴仁, Sano Takahito) is one of the teachers in the space school. Sano attempts to sabotage Asumi because he falsely believes her father was partially responsible for the Lion disaster. He gets in trouble for this and resigns. He resurfaces in the manga with insights on the Lion incident and, once again, gets in trouble for it. However, he eventually reconciles with Asumi's father.

Takahito Sano is voiced by actor Yasunori Masutani in the anime series and is portrayed by actor Seiichi Tanabe in the live-action adaptation.

=== Ringo Sakashita ===
Ringo Sakashita (坂下 リンゴ, Sakashita Ringo)

- Voiced by: Junko Ishī

Ringo is the dorm manager for the Kamome dorms.

=== Toshiko Shiomi ===
Toshiko Shiomi (塩見 敏子, Shiomi Toshiko)

In the anime and manga, Shiomi-sensei becomes the voice of reason when Sano creates trouble for Asumi. In the drama, his gender was changed.

Takahito Sano is voiced by actor Yasunori Masutani in the anime series and is portrayed by actress Kazuko Katou in the live-action adaptation.

=== Nishida ===
Nishida-sensei (西田先生, Nishida sensei)

- Voiced by: Masaya Takatsuka

=== Kiriu ===
Kiriu (桐生) is an orphan and is initially shown as an activist against space exploration. He closely resembles Takashi Shimazu, Asumi's junior high friend. He first meets Asumi at a rally against a rocket launch and gets mad at her. Their relationship, absent from the anime, develops in the manga. In the end, however, Kiriu leaves to do volunteer work elsewhere.

In the drama, his full name is given as Kiriu Haruki (桐生春樹, Haruki Kiriu), and he studies at the aerospace school.

Kiriu does not appear in the anime series; he is portrayed by actor Osamu Mukai in the live-action adaptation.

=== Senri Ukita ===
Senri Ukita (宇喜多 千里, Ukita Senri) is Marika's father.

- Voiced by: Bin Sasaki

Senri Ukita does not appear in the anime series and is portrayed by actress Rikako Murakami in the live-action adaptation.

=== Haruo Suzuki ===
Haruo Suzuki (鈴木 春夫, Suzuki Haruo) is Shu's father, who owns Suzuki Corporation. He blocks Shu's dreams of becoming an astronaut. In the end, he lets Shu alone.

- Voiced by: Bin Sasaki

Haruo Suzuki does not appear in either the anime series or the live-action adaptation.

=== Sakura Suzuki ===
Sakura Suzuki (鈴木 さくら, Suzuki Sakura) is Shu's stepsister.

Sakura Suzuki does not appear in the anime series; she is portrayed by actress Hikari Kikuzato in the live-action adaptation.

=== Mikan Tokushima ===
Mikan Tokushima (徳島 みかん, Tokushima Mikan) is Asumi's underclasswoman in the space school.

Mikan Tokushima does not appear in either the anime series or the live-action adaptation.

=== Yamamoto ===
Yamamoto (山本) is the third applicant that was with Shu and Fuchuya during the Space School's entrance exam.

Yamamoto is voiced by actor Hiroshi Shimozaki in the anime series; he does not appear in the live-action adaptation.

== Other characters ==
=== Kyōko Kamogawa ===
Kyōko Kamogawa (鴨川 今日子, Kamogawa Kyōko) is Asumi's late mother, who was severely injured by in the Lion (獅子号, Shishigō) spacecraft disaster. She was in a coma until she died five years later, when Asumi was six years old.

Kyōko Kamogawa is voiced by actress Hiroko Kasahara in the anime series and is portrayed by actress Fumina Hara in the live-action adaptation.

=== Yuko Suzunari ===
Yuko Suzunari (鈴成 由子, Suzunari Yūko) is Asumi and Fuchuya's grade school teacher. She was also Mr. Lion's ex-fiancée.

Yuko Suzunari is voiced by actress Risa Mizuno in the anime series; she does not appear in the live-action adaptation.

=== Takashi Shimazu ===
Takashi Shimazu (島津 タカシ, Shimazu Takashi) is a classmate of Asumi in junior high school. He was also her classmate in elementary school but was too sickly to regularly attend school. His story is mainly shown in the flashback episode/chapter, "Asumi's Sakura".

Takashi Shimazu is voiced by actor Daisuke Fujita in the anime series; he does not appear in the live-action adaptation.

=== Kasane Shibata ===
Kasane Shibata (柴田 かさね, Shibata Kasane) is Asumi's childhood friend and a survivor of the Lion incident. Because of the crash, she has a horrible burn mark on her left arm. In the present, Kasane goes to an all-girls school. In the manga, her first reappearance shows her sleeping in Asumi's dorm room, which is a few volumes after her reappearance in the anime.

Kasane Shibata is voiced by actress Tomoe Hanba in the anime series; she does not appear in the live-action adaptation.

=== Ryōko Haijima ===
Ryōko Haijima (拝島 涼子, Haijima Ryōko)

Ryōko Haijima is portrayed by actress Manami Honjo in the live-action adaptation.
