= Yumi Sugimoto =

Japanese model, actress, and singer (born 1989)

- 杉本 有美
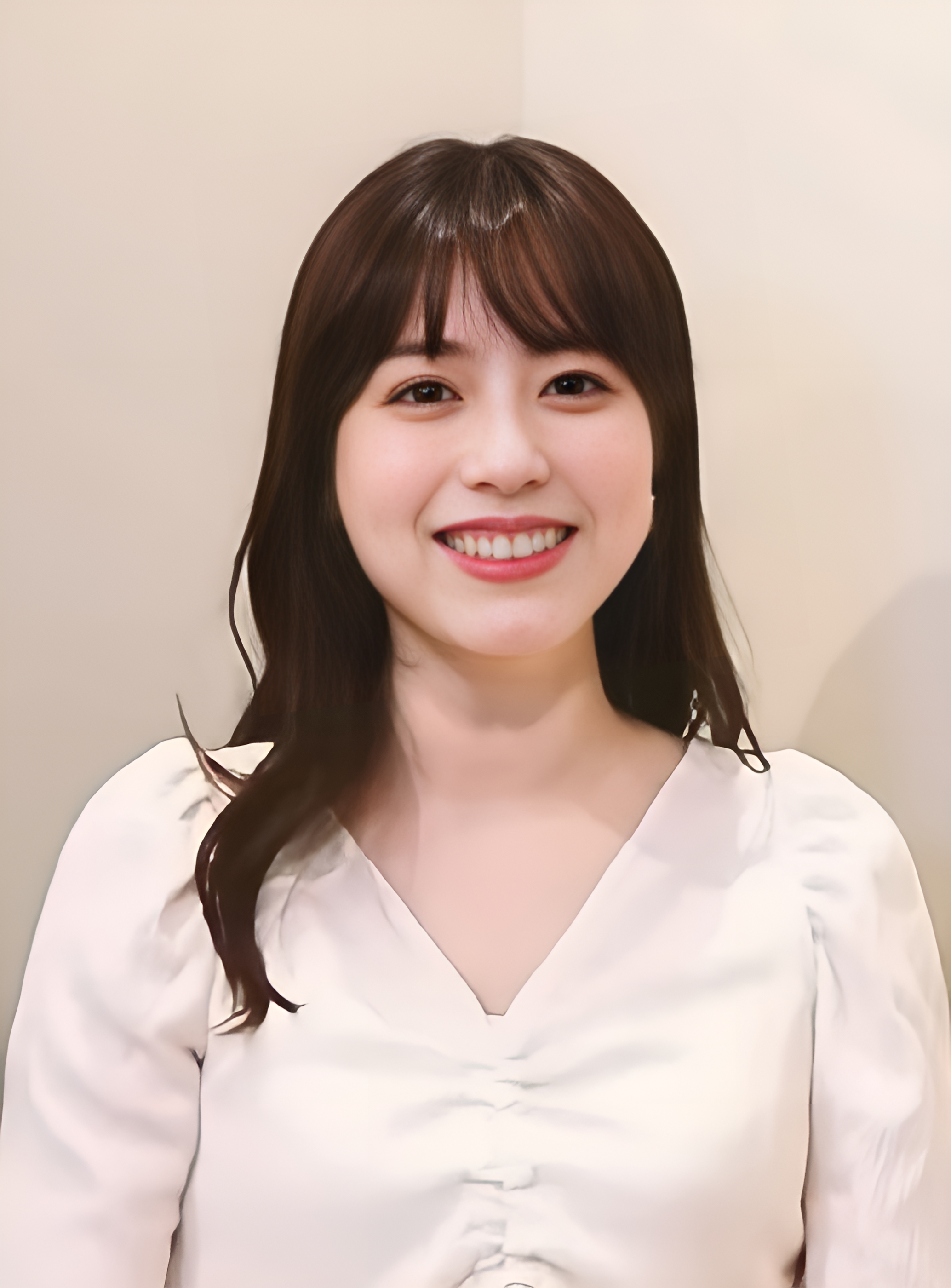
- Sugimoto in 2023
- Born: April 1, 1989 (age 37); Osaka, Osaka Prefecture, Japan
- Occupations: Actress; model; singer
- Years active: 2002 – present
- Height: 168 cm (5 ft 6 in)
- Children: 1
- Website: www.4biz.jp

Yumi Sugimoto (杉本 有美, Sugimoto Yumi; born April 1, 1989) is a Japanese model, actress, and singer. She is currently under contract with the talent agency Face Planning.

== Career ==
=== Modeling career ===
Sugimoto began her career in modeling during elementary school, when she was chosen in a Grand-Prix semi-audition for the girls manga magazine Ribon.

=== Acting career ===
In July 2007 she received her first lead role in TV Tokyo's late TV drama series Boys Esté. Her latest role is Miu Sutō/Go-on Silver in the 2008 TV Asahi's tokusatsu series Engine Sentai Go-onger. She stars also in Mutant Girls Squad under the direction from Tak Sakaguchi, Noburu Iguchi and Yoshihiro Nishimura.

=== Music career ===
Aside from singing character portrayal songs in Engine Sentai Go-onger, Sugimoto has expressed an interest in producing music. She released her debut single, "Harukoi", composed by Tomosuke Funaki, on February 17, 2010.

== Personal life ==
Sugimoto married a non-celebrity man in 2016, but they divorced in July 2019. She announces her remarriage and pregnancy of her first child on May 13, 2026. She gave birth to her first child on October 1.

== Filmography ==
=== Film ===
| Year | Title | Role | Distributor | References |
|---|---|---|---|---|
| 2008 | Engine Sentai Go-onger: Boom Boom! Bang Bang! GekijōBang!! | Miu Sutō/Go-on Silver | Toei | |
| 2009 | Engine Sentai Go-onger vs. Gekiranger | Miu Sutō/Go-on Silver | | |
| 2010 | Samurai Sentai Shinkenger vs. Go-onger: GinmakuBang!! | Miu Sutō/Go-on Silver | | |
| 2010 | Mutant Girls Squad | Rin | Nikkatsu | |

=== TV drama ===
| Year | Title | Role | Network | Other notes | References |
|---|---|---|---|---|---|
| 2007 | Boys Esté | Shizuka Koiwai | TV Tokyo | | |
| 2008 | Coin Locker Monogatari | | TV Asahi | Guest, ep. 2 | |
| 2008 | Engine Sentai Go-onger | Miu Sutō/Go-on Silver | | | |
| 2009 | Buzzer Beat | Saori Akita | Fuji TV | Support Role | |
| 2012 | Kaizoku Sentai Gokaiger | Miu Sutō/Go-on Silver | | Ep. 51 | |
| 2012 | Cleopatra na Onnatchi | Ayaka Satō | NTV | | |
| 2012 | Nemureru Mori no Jukujo | Mayuko Watanabe | NHK | | |
| 2014 | Kurofuku Monogatari | Akemi | TV Asahi | | |
| 2015 | Keiji 7-nin | Yuuna Tanaka | TV Asahi | Guest, Episode 6 | |
| 2015 | Tenshi to Akuma | Natsumi Nozama | TV Asahi | Guest, Episode 1 | |

=== Mobile drama ===
| Year | Title | Role | Network | Other notes | References |
|---|---|---|---|---|---|
| 2007 | 100 Scene no Koi (100 Love Scenes) [100シーンの恋] | | | | |

=== Web drama ===
| Year | Title | Role | Network | Other notes | References |
|---|---|---|---|---|---|
| 2008 | Spring and Fall Frog Prince [春と秋のカエルの王子] | | | June | |

=== Anime ===
| Year | Title | Role | Network | Other notes | References |
|---|---|---|---|---|---|
| 2009 | Kūchū Buranko | Mayumi | Fuji TV | Nurse, live-action appearance. | |

== Stage ==
- Nakano Blondys Musical (12–20 March 2008, Space Zero)

== DVD ==
- Yumi Sugimoto -Flowering- (Released May 2006)
- Yumi Sugimoto -Morning Star- (Released January 2007)
- Yumi Sugimoto -Journey Hitori Sugimoto Yumi 19-year-old- (Released September 2008)

== Discography ==
- Harukoi Hana Taipu (ハルコイ 花タイプ) (released February 17, 2010)
