= Rika Nakase =

Japanese anime screenwriter

Rika Nakase (中瀬 理香, Nakase Rika) is a Japanese anime screenwriter. She has participated in anime of various genres either as a scriptwriter or in series composition, and tends to work more with series in which girls are the main characters. Although she is credited as Rika Nakase for many of her works, she has been using the name Rika Takasugi (たかすぎ 梨香, Takasugi Rika) since 2023. When she co-writes with Masashi Sogo, she uses the name Rika Sogo (十川 梨香, Sogo Rika).

== Works ==
- Kodocha (1996–1998) – Script
- Hamtaro (2000–2006) – Script
- Fruits Basket (2001) – Series composition
- Ask Dr. Rin! (2001–2002) – Script
- Princess Tutu (2002–2003) – Script
- Full Moon o Sagashite (2002–2003) – Script
- Samurai Deeper Kyo (2002) – Script
- Monkey Typhoon (2003) – Series composition (eps 21–26)
- Yami to Bōshi to Hon no Tabibito (2003) – Script
- Gad Guard (2003) – Script
- Rumic Theater (2003) – Script
- Kaleido Star (2003) – Script
- Twin Spica (2002–2003) – Script
- Mermaid Melody Pichi Pichi Pitch (2003–2004) – Script
- Di Gi Charat Nyo! (2003–2004) – Script
- Croket! (2003–2005) – Script
- Genshiken (2004) – Script
- Burst Angel (2004) – Script
- The Marshmallow Times (2004–2005) – Series composition
- AM Driver (2004–2005) – Script
- Bleach (2004) – Script
- Gallery Fake (2004–2006) – Script
- Twin Princess of Wonder Planet (2005–2006) – Series composition
- Eyeshield 21 (2005–2008) – Script
- Ginban Kaleidoscope (2005) – Script
- To Heart 2 (2005) – Script
- Ginga Densetsu Weed (2005) – Script
- When They Cry (2006) – Script
- Kirarin Revolution (2006–2009) – Script
- Twin Princess of Wonder Planet Gyu! (2006) – Series composition
- Higurashi no Naku Koro ni (2006) – Script
- Ghost Hunt (2006) – Script
- Rocket Girls (2007) – Series composition
- Engage Planet Kiss Dum (2007) – Script
- Tōka Gettan (2007) – Script
- When They Cry: Kai (2007) – Script
- Junjou Romantica (2008) – Series composition
- The Familiar of Zero (2008) – Script
- Shaolin Girl (2008) – Script
- Junjou Romantica 2 (2008) – Series composition
- Kanamemo (2009) – Series composition
- Working!! (2010) – Script
- The World's Greatest First Love (2011) – Series composition
- The World's Greatest First Love 2 (2011) – Series composition
- Mobile Suit Gundam AGE (2011) – Script
- Hiiro no Kakera: The Tamayori Princess Saga (2012) – Script
- Hiiro no Kakera: The Tamayori Princess Saga 2 (2012) – Script
- From the New World (2012) – Script
- Kyousougiga (2013) – Script
- Tamagotchi! Miracle Friends (2013–2014) – Script
- Phi Brain: Puzzle of God (season 3) (2014) – Script
- GO-GO Tamagotchi! (2014) – Script
- Dance with Devils (2015) – Script
- Rilu Rilu Fairilu: Yōsei no Door (2016) – Script
- Number24 (2020) – Series composition
- Ōoku: The Inner Chambers (2023) – Series composition
- Yakuza Fiancé (2024) – Series composition
- From Far Away (2026) – Series composition
