= Twin Spica =

Japanese manga and anime series

- Cover art of the first Twin Spica manga volume featuring lead character Asumi Kamogawa

ふたつのスピカ (Futatsu no Supika)
- Genre: Coming-of-age, science fiction
- Manga
- Written by: Kou Yaginuma
- Published by: Media Factory
- English publisher: NA: Vertical
- Magazine: Comic Flapper
- Original run: September 5, 2001 – August 5, 2009
- Volumes: 16
- Anime television series
- Directed by: Tomomi Mochizuki
- Written by: Rika Nakase
- Music by: Kazunori Miyake
- Studio: Group TAC
- Original network: NHK BS2
- English network: SEA: Animax Asia
- Original run: November 1, 2003 – March 27, 2004
- Episodes: 20
- Television drama
- Directed by: Takeyoshi Yamamoto; Ayuko Tsukahara
- Written by: Shūko Arai; Daigo Matsui
- Music by: Atsushi Umehori
- Original network: NHK General TV, NHK BS Hi-Vision
- Original run: June 18, 2009 – July 30, 2009
- Episodes: 7
- icon

Twin Spica (Japanese: ふたつのスピカ, Hepburn: Futatsu no Supika) is a Japanese manga series written and illustrated by Kou Yaginuma. The "realistic, slice-of-life science fiction series" tells the story of a group of Japanese high school students training to become astronauts in the early 21st century after the country's first human spaceflight launch ends in a disaster that causes many civilian casualties. It was serialized in the seinen manga magazine Comic Flapper from September 2001 to August 2009 and was later published in 16 tankōbon volumes by Media Factory from January 2002 to October 2009.

The series is named after Spica, a binary star system and the brightest star in the constellation Virgo. In the manga, Yaginuma includes many references to historical events related to the development of human spaceflight as well as literary works such as Kenji Miyazawa's novel Night on the Galactic Railroad. American publishing company Vertical announced acquisition of the manga's license for English-language translation at the New York Anime Festival in September 2009, and the translated first volume was published in May 2010. The series was described by Vertical marketing director Ed Chavez as "technically sound" and "heartfelt" during its initial assessment.

The manga was adapted into an anime television series by animation studio Group TAC. It premiered on November 1, 2003, on Japan's NHK BS2 satellite channel. Twenty episodes of the anime aired until March 27, 2004, when the series concluded prematurely before the manga was completed. Satellite television network Animax has broadcast the anime in multiple regional language releases, including English. A live-action adaptation was produced by NHK in cooperation with the Japan Aerospace Exploration Agency and aired between June 18 and July 30, 2009.

== Story ==
Author and creator Kou Yaginuma began writing the back-story of Twin Spica in 2000 with his debut work "2015:Fireworks" (2015年の打ち上げ花火, "2015 Nen no Uchiage Hanabi"). In it and in subsequent writings, Yaginuma constructed a future history of the development of Japan's spaceflight program. He introduces readers to a future following the launch of Japan's first crewed spaceflight mission, the Lion (獅子号, Shishigō), in 2010. The mission ends in disaster when the liquid rocket booster fuel catches fire 72 seconds after liftoff. Mission controllers are unable to activate the craft's abort sequence, and the rocket crashes into the city of Yuigahama, causing many casualties among residents.

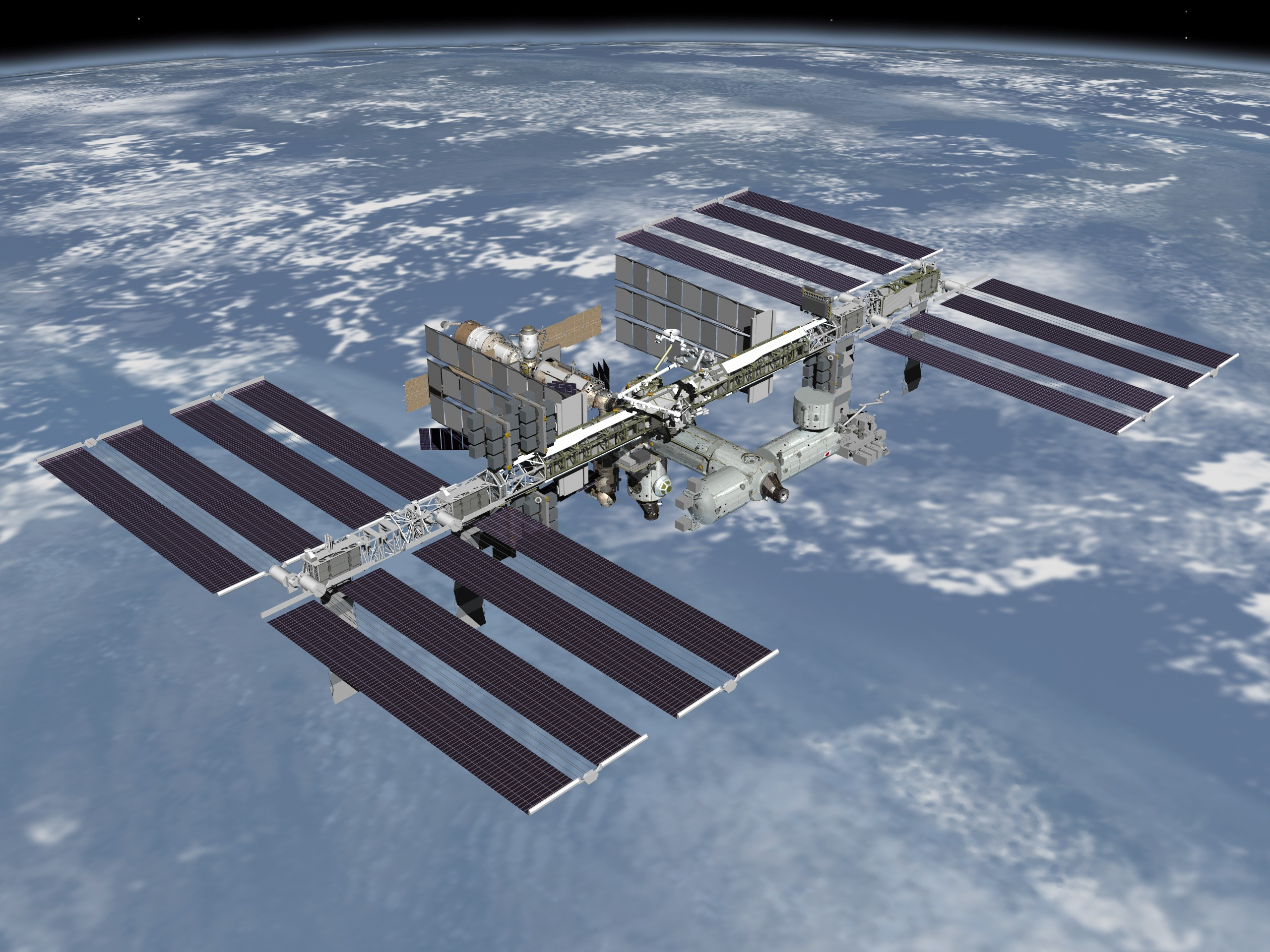
In Twin Spica, the International Space Station is de-orbited in 2024.

The Lion's explosion becomes one of the major accidents in spaceflight history and sets Japan's spaceflight program back by over a decade. In the years following the accident, the public accuses those involved with the Lion program of negligence. Rumors also begin to circulate about the offshore outsourcing of the rocket's production despite the government's claims that it was developed domestically. To promote recovery from the tragedy, the Ministry of Education, Culture, Sports, Science and Technology establishes the Tokyo National Space School in 2014 as a vocational high school dedicated to training a new generation of students in the space sciences. Japan's spaceflight program is finally reactivated ten years later with the admission of students into the academy's astronaut training program. In the same year, the last operating module of the International Space Station is retired and destroyed by atmospheric reentry following completion of the station's long-term mission. Subsequent development projects are to be completed by individual countries with active spaceflight programs. Of the students in the inaugural class of the astronaut training program, one is selected to join Japan's second crewed mission in 2027. It is the final mission toward completing a space-based solar power satellite.

== Main characters ==
Asumi Kamogawa and Mr. Lion in the prequel "2015:Fireworks"

Yaginuma's work prior to serialization introduces readers to Asumi Kamogawa and her mentor, the ghost of a Lion astronaut whom she calls Mr. Lion. Their friendship develops in several short stories in which, throughout her childhood, he nurtures Asumi's interest in space. As her interest and dreams grow, Asumi is often ridiculed by classmates, especially because she immerses herself in books about space and rarely engages in classroom activities. When she decides to apply for admission to the Tokyo Space Academy, her teachers urge her to reconsider because she is below average height. Her friendship with Mr. Lion continues to grow after Asumi successfully enters the academy, and she often consults him during periods of self-doubt.

Asumi's elementary and middle school classmate Shinnosuke Fuchuya also enters the academy much to her surprise. He defended Asumi from ridicule by other classmates throughout their childhood despite occasionally teasing her as well, and it has been suggested that he sees her as a romantic interest. The two eventually befriend three other students in the astronaut training program. Shu Suzuki, who is named student representative for the astronaut program, has an easygoing personality. He wears a distinctive face by shaving his eyebrows as a symbol of defiance against his father. Kei Oumi befriends Asumi during the academy's entrance examination and is portrayed with an outgoing personality and a deep sense of loyalty toward her friends. Marika Ukita initially responds coldly toward gestures of friendship, but she moves into Asumi's dormitory following an argument with her father. The five students later make a promise to complete the astronaut program together as their friendship grows stronger. After three years in the astronaut program, Asumi is chosen out of eleven remaining students to take part in Japan's second human spaceflight mission, making her, at the age of eighteen, the youngest person to go into space.

Throughout their time at the academy, astronaut candidates must overcome numerous physical and mental trials. Readers discover from a pre-serialization story that Asumi's mother dies following the Lion disaster, but this is not known to Asumi's friends until Kei discovers the obituary listing in a newspaper article. Marika is revealed to be the genetic copy of a deceased Marika Ukita despite a standing ban on human cloning. Fuchuya suffers from red-green color blindness after his eyes are exposed to an exploding firework at close range in a childhood accident. Unknown to the group, Shu suffers from hereditary hemoptysis (coughing up of blood) and dies from the condition soon after his selection as an exchange student to the American space program. This tragedy reveals Kei's feelings for him, which she keeps hidden for much of the series.

== Production ==
=== Writing ===
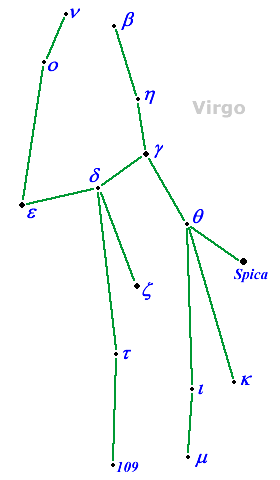
The constellation Virgo as it appears in the manga.

The series is named after Spica, a binary star system in the constellation Virgo and one of the brightest stars in the nighttime sky. It appears as one star because of the relatively low center-to-center distance between the two component stars, estimated at an average of 11 million miles (17.7 million km). Astronomical observations also suggest that there may be additional stars in the Spica system. In the story, Asumi mentions Spica's distance to Earth as 350 light-years. This figure is also cited by the Japan Aerospace Exploration Agency; however, other sources indicate a distance of approximately 260 light-years.

Kou Yaginuma's initial inspiration for the story came from a statement he once read describing the Hohner Little Lady harmonica as one of the first musical instruments taken into space. However, as an aspiring manga artist, Yaginuma had neither resources to conduct research on nor knowledge pertaining to spaceflight. He also hesitated to write the series because his own life experiences did not reflect the dreams of his characters. Despite these challenges, Yaginuma found comfort in the determination of his characters, especially that of Asumi Kamogawa.

Although Twin Spica began serialization in the October 2001 issue of Media Factory's Comic Flapper magazine, its lead character Asumi had appeared in Yaginuma's debut work "2015:Fireworks". This short story published in the July 2000 issue of Comic Flapper also introduced readers to Asumi's father, her elementary school teacher Yuko Suzunari, and the astronaut ghost Mr. Lion. Four additional short stories that predate the series also feature Asumi as the central character: "Asumi" (アスミ), "Campanella's Forest" (カムパネルラの森, "Kamupanerura no Mori"), "Our Stars, Leaf Stars" (ふたりの星 はっぱ星, "Futari no Hoshi, Happa Hoshi"), and "Asumi's Cherry Tree" (アスミの桜, "Asumi no Sakura"). These slice-of-life stories eventually served as prequels to Twin Spica.

=== Cultural references ===
Twin Spica and its prequel stories make various references to historical figures and events in space exploration. Throughout the manga and the anime, Mr. Lion carries with him a harmonica, one of the first musical instruments to be played in space. A harmonica and bell set was carried aboard the Gemini 6A spaceflight in December 1965 by American astronauts Wally Schirra and Thomas Patten Stafford. During the mission, the two men used these instruments to play "Jingle Bells". Asumi is nicknamed "Seagull" by Shu Suzuki in the anime. The same name was used as the call sign of Soviet cosmonaut Valentina Tereshkova, the first woman in space, during her 1963 mission aboard Vostok 6. Prior to Shu's death in the live-action adaptation, he reveals to his friends that the New Horizons spacecraft destined for Pluto carries the cremated ashes of the dwarf planet's discoverer, Clyde Tombaugh. Asumi later brings Shu's ashes during her first journey into space.

There are also various references to real-world literary and musical works. The titles of two short stories in the manga, "Campanella's Forest" and "Giovanni's Ticket" (ジヨバンニの切符, "Jiyobanni no Kippu"), refer to the two main characters of Kenji Miyazawa's novel Night on the Galactic Railroad. It appears in the penultimate episode of the anime and is also a favorite book of the original Marika Ukita. In both the manga and the live-action adaptation, Kei makes a request for Shu to play the piano piece "Der Flohwalzer", known in Japan as "Neko Funjatta" (猫踏んじゃった; lit. 'I Stepped on the Cat'), if he becomes the first in their group to go into space.

== Media ==
=== Manga ===
Cover of Comic Flapper magazine dated September 2009 containing the final chapter of Twin Spica. Note that Mr. Lion is present here, while he leaves at an earlier point in the story in the anime adaptation.

Twin Spica began serialization in the October 2001 issue of the seinen (aimed at younger adult men) manga magazine Comic Flapper. It continued until the publication of the 89th chapter on August 5, 2009. The series was also published in tankōbon format in 16 volumes, with the final volume being published on October 23, 2009. Yaginuma's prequel short stories published prior to serialization are interspersed throughout these compilations. Two were included in the first volume; two were included in the second volume; and one was included in the third volume. Three additional prequel stories were also written by Yaginuma during serialization and published in the fourth, sixth, and ninth volumes, respectively. On March 23, 2006, Media Factory published the 80-page Twin Spica Illustration Book (ふたつのスピカイラストブック, Futatsu no Supika Irasutobukku; ISBN 978-4-8401-1380-9) featuring color art from the manga. It also included a 24-month calendar and an interview with Kou Yaginuma.

The series is licensed by Tong Li Publishing for Chinese-language release in Taiwan under the title Dream of Spica (Chinese: 麥穗星之夢; pinyin: Màisuìxīng zhī mèng). It was translated by Li Lin-hui (Chinese: 李臨麾; pinyin: Lǐ Línhuī), and the first volume was released in May 2005. Following a three-week contract negotiation, the American publishing company Vertical announced at the 2009 New York Anime Festival that it had acquired the license to publish the series in English. Marketing director Ed Chavez explained that the motivation to acquire Twin Spica came from the company's desire to license works from Japanese publishers that have yet to form committed partnerships with major American publishers. He proposed continuing a previous partnership with Media Factory, from which Vertical licensed The Guin Saga's manga adaptation. Vertical's distributor Random House announced a release date of May 4, 2010, for the first translated volume, contrary to the initial announcement that it will be released in August 2010. Chavez later confirmed via Twitter that Vertical would condense its North American releases into 12 volumes.

=== Anime ===
Japanese animation studio Group TAC produced Twin Spica's anime adaptation, which was broadcast by NHK. The 20-episode series premiered on November 1, 2003, and aired until its conclusion on March 27, 2004. Tomomi Mochizuki directed the anime series, and Rika Nakase wrote its screenplay. Masako Goto designed the characters for animation. When the series reached its conclusion, only 30 chapters of the manga had been published. Chapter 25, which concludes the story of Asumi and her classmates undergoing a test of their survival skills, was the final chapter to be adapted for the anime. Consequently, the series concludes prematurely with Asumi's ghost companion Lion-san leaving when he no longer has anything to teach her and her friends. The manga, however, continues with Lion-san appearing in subsequent chapters until his eventual departure in chapter 88. The anime series also aired in other parts of Asia on Animax. It was released in VHS and DVD formats by King Records in five compilation volumes each. A special DVD collection containing the five flashback episodes—episodes 1, 5, 9, 12, and 16—was released on May 26, 2004, and a five-disc DVD box set was released on July 22, 2004. A two-part novelization of the anime and an official guide book to the adaptation were published in April 2004. The English-language dubbing of the Twin Spica anime premiered on Animax Asia on January 24, 2005.

=== Drama ===
NHK announced a seven-episode live-action television drama adaptation on March 30, 2009, produced in cooperation with the Japan Aerospace Exploration Agency, the country's national aerospace agency. Sixteen-year-old actress Nanami Sakuraba was cast for the role of Asumi Kamogawa, and filming for the series began on April 2. The drama was scheduled to air on June 11 but was eventually postponed by one week until June 18. Its airing coincided with the celebration of the International Year of Astronomy. Screenplay for the series was written by Shūko Arai and Daigo Matsui. While writing the script, Arai found himself encouraged by the characters who must overcome various struggles in order to achieve their dreams. He also specified hopes and dreams as central themes in the story. Among the changes made in this adaptation is the removal of Lion-san as a central character. Yaginuma did not make any restrictions for Arai and Matsui as he believed they knew the television audience best. "Nevertheless," he said, "I think the little Asumi I know and the Asumi portrayed by Ms. Nanami are both looking at the same sky." A three-disc DVD compilation box set of the adaptation was released by Geneon Universal Entertainment on December 23, 2009.

=== Music ===
The song "Venus Say" by female pop musical group Buzy (band) was used as the anime's opening theme, and it was released as a maxi single with two other songs on March 3, 2004. The single remained on the Oricon music charts for seven weeks with a peak position at 29th place. Male pop group Begin adapted Kyu Sakamoto's 1963 single "Miagete Goran Yoru no Hoshi o" (見上げてごらん夜の星を; lit. "Look Up at the Stars at Night") as the ending theme song. A full soundtrack containing the two theme songs and 33 additional instrumental tracks by composer Kazunori Miyake was released on May 26, 2004. Alternative rock band Orange Range's song "Hitomi no Saki ni" (瞳の先に; lit. 'Ahead of Eyes') was used as the ending theme for the live-action series. It was released as a maxi single with two other songs on July 8, 2009, and remained on the Oricon music charts for six weeks with a peak position at 5th place. A full soundtrack for the series containing 21 instrumental tracks was released by Harbor Records on August 5, 2009.

== Reception ==
In an interview with the Yomiuri Shimbun, Japanese astronaut Koichi Wakata named Twin Spica, because of its nostalgic story, as one of five manga series which highlight the dream of reaching space. While assessing the series for licensing in English, Vertical marketing director Ed Chavez, a fan of science fiction, found its story "technically sound" and noted it as "possibly one of the most heartfelt series I've read in ages". He hoped that the series would rank in top 10 of The New York Times Graphic Books Best Seller List for manga and believed that it would make Vertical a "known name, not only amongst better comic shops and independent book stores, but also with anime fans and casual graphic novel readers". While the series was originally published in a seinen magazine, Chavez expected that it would also appeal to fans of shōjo manga. He believed that the word seinen "means adult and does not make reference to gender". He hoped Twin Spica will prove to be a financial success and enable Vertical to fund future licenses of classic works by Osamu Tezuka and the Forty-Niners. The first volume in English was listed by Publishers Weekly as one of the most anticipated graphic novels of 2010.

Jennifer Berman of THEM Anime Reviews rated the anime adaptation of Twin Spica five out of five stars but told readers, "Subtract a star if you don't like anime that have a somewhat slow pace." Berman praised its artistic design and noted that the character designs reminded her of works by Studio Ghibli. She found the characters "likeable" and saw Marika Ukita as the most intriguing character. Despite her praises, Berman noted one weakness in the anime adaptation. She observed the ending as "a rather open-ended one, and while it wasn't a bad ending, they probably should have thought of something better". Similar to the manga, the anime series was seen as gender neutral. Sony Pictures Entertainment vice president Todd Miller stated that Twin Spica was one of the titles aired on Animax which appealed to both genders. The first episode of the drama series aired with a 3.4 percent domestic viewership rating. Reviewers from the Yomiuri Shimbun rated the live-action adaptation an average two out of three stars and ranked it third overall among 11 series airing in Q3 2009.

== See also ==
- Human spaceflight
- Japan Aerospace Exploration Agency
- Space Shuttle Challenger disaster
