= Kou Yaginuma =

Japanese manga artist

- Born: February 14, 1973 (age 53); Iidabashi, Tokyo, Japan
- Occupation: Manga artist

Kou Yaginuma (柳沼 行, Yaginuma Kō; born February 14, 1973) is a Japanese manga artist. In June 2000, his debut work, "The Fireworks of 2015" (2015年の打ち上げ花火, "2015 Nen no Uchiage Hanabi"), began serialization in the Comic Flapper manga magazine.

"The Fireworks of 2015" would serve as a prequel to his later and most notable work, Twin Spica, which began serialization in September 2001 in Comic Flapper. Twin Spica was adapted in 2003 into an anime television series, animated by Group TAC and directed by Tomomi Mochizuki, which premièred in Japan on NHK.

== Works ==
- Twin Spica (2001–2009)
- Hoshi no Koe (2002), novel illustrations
- Gunryoku no Jiu (2010–2013)
