= Tensou Sentai Goseiger Returns =

- Kanji: 帰ってきた天装戦隊ゴセイジャー last epic ～護星天使が国民的アイドルに？！～
- Revised Hepburn: Kaettekita Tensō Sentai Goseijā: Rasuto Epikku ~Gosei Tenshi ga Kokuminteki Aidoru ni?!~
- Directed by: Takao Nagaishi
- Written by: Miyako Hatano; Michiko Yokote (uncredited)
- Produced by: Motoi Sasaki; Takaaki Utsunomiya; Jun Hikasa; Go Wakamatsu; Takahito Ōmori; Kōichi Yada; Akihiro Fukada
- Starring: Yudai Chiba; Rika Sato; Kyousuke Hamao; Mikiho Niwa; Kento Ono; Mayuko Iwasa
- Music by: Kazunori Miyake
- Distributed by: Toei Co. Ltd
- Release date: June 21, 2011
- Running time: 44 minutes
- Country: Japan
- Language: Japanese

Tensou Sentai Goseiger Returns: Last Epic - The Gosei Angels are National Idols!? (帰ってきた天装戦隊ゴセイジャー last epic ～護星天使が国民的アイドルに？！～, Kaettekita Tensō Sentai Goseijā: Rasuto Epikku ~Gosei Tenshi ga Kokuminteki Aidoru ni?!~) is a V-Cinema release for Tensou Sentai Goseiger, serving as an epilogue for the series, prior to the Legendary War in the series' successor Kaizoku Sentai Gokaiger. The direct-to-video film was released on June 21, 2011.

== Plot ==
After defeating Brajira, foiling his plot to destroy Earth, and erasing all memory of it from humanity's minds, the Goseigers go their separate ways while continuing to protect Earth. (Note: As depicted in the Tensou Sentai Goseiger episode "Protecting the Planet is an Angel's Mission".) While changing bills at a bank, Alata reveals his powers to stop a trio of bank robbers before attempting to erase the memories of everyone present, only to find that the card he needs to do so is not working. After escaping his newfound fans, Alata reunites with his allies, who reveal he exposed them all and that their memory-erasing cards have also stopped working. Soon enough, their ally Datas joins them to reveal that a strange cloud formation is negating the cards and is spreading quickly. The Goseigers' leader Master Head advises them to return to Gosei World, but they opt to stay and locate the cloud's source before Alata convinces them to go public. Following an emergency press conference, they encounter talent agent Sakai, who offers to become their manager.

They accept, though their celebrity status quickly wears thin on them and detracts from their investigation. Complicating matters, they end up being framed for trespassing on the Prime Minister's estate before their ally Gosei Knight returns to save them before they get arrested. Nonetheless, much of the public have turned against them. While watching the news, the Goseigers theorize someone from Sakai Entertainment framed them. Upon reaching the building, they find that nearly every human there is emitting the darkness in their hearts in the form of black mist, which is feeding the strange cloud, and that it is tied to Brajira's Beebe Bugs. Before long, they discover the culprit is Sakai's aide, Yumeko Hoshino, a struggling actress who became possessed by the King Beebe Bug and willingly helped him seek revenge on the Goseigers. Forming over her, King Beebe overpowers them, taking advantage of their unwillingness to harm a civilian in the hopes of defeating them on live television. With Datas' help, the Goseigers' ally Nozomu Amachi establishes a pirate broadcast to remind the city's inhabitants of all the good that the Goseigers did, causing King Beebe's hold on them to fade. With an arriving Gosei Knight's help, the Goseigers reach out to Yumeko, redeeming her and causing the cloud to disappear and King Beebe to separate from her. After being defeated by the Gosei warriors, he uses the last of the darkness he absorbed to enlarge himself, but is killed by their mecha.

Afterward, the Goseigers ensure Yumeko's safety and encourage her to continue following her dreams before successfully using their memory-erasing cards to remove all memory of King Beebe's attack and returning to their lives.

== Cast ==
- Alata: Yudai Chiba (千葉 雄大, Chiba Yūdai)
- Eri: Rika Sato (さとう 里香, Satō Rika)
- Agri: Kyousuke Hamao (浜尾 京介, Hamao Kyōsuke)
- Moune: Mikiho Niwa (にわ みきほ, Niwa Mikiho)
- Hyde: Kento Ono (小野 健斗, Ono Kento)
- Gosei Knight: Katsuyuki Konishi (小西 克幸, Konishi Katsuyuki; Voice)
- Nozomu Amachi: Sakuya Nakamura (中村 咲哉, Nakamura Sakuya)
- Professor Shuichiro Amachi: Louis Yamada LIII (山田ルイ53世, Yamada Rui Gojūsan-sei)
- Datas: Kōki Miyata (宮田 幸季, Miyata Kōki; Voice)
- Yumeko Hoshino: Mayuko Iwasa (岩佐 真悠子, Iwasa Mayuko)
- Sakai: Kenji Anan (阿南 健治, Anan Kenji)
- MC Matsu Tomioka: Michael Tomioka (マイケル富岡, Maikeru Tomioka)
- King Beebe: Kenji Nomura (乃村 健次, Nomura Kenji; Voice)
