= Gokaiger Goseiger Super Sentai 199 Hero Great Battle =

- Official movie poster

Japanese name
- Kanji: ゴーカイジャー ゴセイジャー スーパー戦隊199ヒーロー 大決戦
Transcriptions
- Revised Hepburn: Gōkaijā Goseijā Sūpā Sentai Hyakukyūjūkyū Hīrō Daikessen
- Directed by: Noboru Takemoto
- Written by: Naruhisa Arakawa
- Based on: Himitsu Sentai Gorenger by Shotaro Ishinomori Super Sentai concept by Toei Company
- Produced by: Motoi Sasaki; Takaaki Utsunomiya; Takahiro Omori; Koichi Yada; Akihiro Fukada; Tsuyoshi Nakano
- Starring: Ryota Ozawa; Yuki Yamada; Mao Ichimichi; Kazuki Shimizu; Yui Koike; Yudai Chiba; Rika Sato; Kyousuke Hamao; Mikiho Niwa; Kento Ono
- Narrated by: Tomokazu Seki
- Cinematography: Shingo Osawa
- Edited by: Ren Sato
- Music by: Kosuke Yamashita; Kazunori Miyake
- Production companies: TV Asahi; Toei Company; Toei Agency; Ishinomori Productions; Bandai; Kinoshita Komuten
- Distributed by: Toei Company
- Release date: June 11, 2011
- Running time: 81 minutes
- Country: Japan
- Language: Japanese
- Budget: ¥2.5 billion (Japan); US$3.5 million
- Box office: ¥11.4 billion (Japan); US$10.7 million

Gokaiger Goseiger Super Sentai 199 Hero Great Battle (Note: Japanese: ゴーカイジャー ゴセイジャー スーパー戦隊199ヒーロー 大決戦, Hepburn: Gōkaijā Goseijā Sūpā Sentai Hyakukyūjūkyū Hīrō Daikesse) is a Japanese tokusatsu superhero film originally set for release on June 11, 2011 to commemorate the 35th anniversary of the Super Sentai Series. The film was directed by Noboru Takemoto and written by Naruhisa Arakawa, and primarily features the casts of Kaizoku Sentai Gokaiger and Tensou Sentai Goseiger, among the 199 total heroes from the Super Sentai series to appear.

== Plot ==
Sometime prior, amidst the Legend War, the Goseigers and Gosei Knight are overwhelmed by the Zangyack Empire's first invasion force until they are saved by the Gorengers and J.A.K.Q. team's leaders, Akarenger and Big One respectively, who came to assemble the 34 Sentai teams. With the Sentai teams' supporting heroes giving them safe passage, Akarenger, Big One, and the Goseigers convene with the other 33 Sentai teams to battle the Zangyack army before Akarenger calls for everyone to sacrifice their powers to destroy the armada, dispersing them across the universe. As the depowered Sentai teams regroup and part ways, Aka Red, having seen the Legend War from space, goes on to collect the powers, turn them into Ranger Keys, and contribute to the Gokaigers' formation.

In the present, the Gokaigers battle the Zangyack Empire's second invasion force until the Goseigers take their powers back. While the Zangyack forces retreat, the Goseigers demand Gosei Knight's key, but the Gokaigers, unaware that they have it, refuse to listen and withdraw. Meanwhile, Zangyack commander Warz Gill is visited by the Black Cross King, the embodiment of the 34 Sentai teams' defeated enemies, who proposes an alliance so he can take revenge on the Sentai teams and their allies in exchange for allowing Zangyack to have Earth.

As Warz agrees, the Gokaigers familiarize themselves with the Sixth Hero Ranger Keys they recently acquired (Note: As depicted in the Kaizoku Sentai Gokaiger episode "Clash! Sentai vs. Sentai".) before the Goseigers use their mecha to attack them. The Gokaigers form their own mecha to fight back, during which the Gokaigers' Captain Marvelous realizes it is a distraction and stops the Goseigers' leader Alata from taking Gosei Knight's key. However, both teams are attacked by the Black Cross King, who steals most of the Gokaigers' Ranger Keys and resurrects Brajira of the Messiah, Crime Minister Yogoshimacritein, and Hades God Dagon, who subsequently teleport the Sentai teams to other locations. While investigating the disappearances, the Gokaigers' ally Navi discovers the Gosei Knight Key.

Finding themselves scattered across various locations, the Gokaigers and Goseigers reluctantly join forces to defeat the resurrected monsters, regroup, and return to their original location, where they are met by Navi and a restored Gosei Knight. The two teams agree to work together to stop the Black Cross King, who brings the Gokaigers' Ranger Keys to life to stop them. After a grueling battle, the Gokaigers and Goseigers eventually defeat and recover the Ranger Keys. Taking advantage of their weakened states, the Black Cross King enlarges himself, but the Sentai teams are suddenly engulfed by a bright light, during which representatives of the J.A.K.Q. team, Denjimen, Goggle-V, Dynamen, Biomen, Turborangers, Dairangers, Boukengers, and Go-ongers give them their blessings as Sentai teams and the Gokaigers access to their respective teams' Great Powers. Marvelous asks for their aid, which they answer by creating the Super Sentai Bazooka.

The Gokaigers and Goseigers use it to defeat the Black Cross King, who transforms into his true form, the Black Cross Colossus, and wreaks havoc on Tokyo. The Sentai teams summon their mecha to fight him, but he overpowers them and defeats Gosei Knight. On the ground, the Goseigers' ally Nozomu Amachi urges Tokyo's citizens not to give up hope and cheer for the Sentai teams. This support miraculously restores the Gokaigers and Goseigers' mecha and summons their Sentai predecessors' mecha as well. The Black Cross Colossus resurrects an army of the Sentai teams' defeated enemies, but the Sentai mecha kill them once more. With his warriors gone, the Gokaigers receive the Gorengers' Great Power, the Variblune, and use it to kill the Black Cross Colossus.

With the battle over, the preceding Sentai mecha vanish as the crowd thanks the Gokaigers and Goseigers, who give their powers back to the Gokaigers and entrust them with their Great Power. As the Gokaigers sail off, Gokai Silver watches them from afar.

== Cast ==
- Captain Marvelous: Ryota Ozawa
- Joe Gibken: Yuki Yamada
- Luka Millfy: Mao Ichimichi
- Don Dogoier: Kazuki Shimizu
- Ahim de Famille: Yui Koike
- Navi: Yukari Tamura (voice)
- Alata: Yudai Chiba
- Eri: Rika Sato
- Agri: Kyousuke Hamao
- Moune: Mikiho Niwa
- Hyde: Kento Ono (小野 健斗, Ono Kento)
- Gosei Knight: Katsuyuki Konishi (小西 克幸, Konishi Katsuyuki; Voice)
- Nozomu Amachi: Sakuya Nakamura (中村 咲哉, Nakamura Sakuya)
- Chiaki Tani: Shogo Suzuki (鈴木 勝吾, Suzuki Shōgo)
- Genta Umemori: Keisuke Sohma (相馬 圭祐, Sōma Keisuke)
- Saki Rōyama: Rina Aizawa (逢沢 りな, Aizawa Rina)
- Satoru Akashi: Mitsuomi Takahashi (高橋 光臣, Takahashi Mitsuomi)
- Koume "Umeko" Kodou: Mika Kikuchi (菊地 美香, Kikuchi Mika)
- Ryo of the Heavenly Fire Star: Keiichi Wada (和田 圭市, Wada Keiichi)
- Riki Honoo: Kenta Sato (佐藤 健太, Satō Kenta)
- Shirō Gō: Ryosuke Sakamoto (坂元 亮介, Sakamoto Ryōsuke)
- Rei Tachibana: Sayoko Hagiwara (萩原 佐代子, Hagiwara Sayoko)
- Kanpei Kuroda: Jyunichi Haruta (春田 純一, Haruta Jun'ichi)
- Daigoro Oume: Kenji Ohba (大葉 健二, Ōba Kenji)
- Big One/Sokichi Banba, Aorenger Voice: Hiroshi Miyauchi (宮内 洋, Miyauchi Hiroshi)
- Tsuyoshi Kaijo: Naoya Makoto (誠 直也, Makoto Naoya)
- Ninja Red, Black Knight (Hyuuga): Teruaki Ogawa (小川 輝晃, Ogawa Teruaki; Voice)
- Signalman: Hōchū Ōtsuka (大塚 芳忠, Ōtsuka Hōchū; Voice)
- Anubian Chief Doggie "Boss" Kruger / Deka Master: Tetsu Inada (稲田 徹, Inada Tesu; Voice)
- Wolzard Fire: Tsutomu Isobe (磯部 勉, Isobe Tsutomu; Voice)
- Salaryman: Yoshiyuki Tsubokura (坪倉 由幸, Tsubokura Yoshiyuki) of Wagaya (我が家)
- Bandsman: Hiroyuki Sugiyama (杉山 裕之, Sugiyama Hiroyuki) of Wagaya
- Bank Clerk: Shun Yatabe (谷田部 俊, Yatabe Shun) of Wagaya
- Warz Gill: Hirofumi Nojima (野島 裕史, Nojima Hirofumi; Voice)
- Damarasu: Kōji Ishii (石井 康嗣, Ishii Kōji; Voice)
- Insarn: Kikuko Inoue (井上 喜久子, Inoue Kikuko; Voice)
- Barizorg: Gaku Shindo (進藤 学, Shindō Gaku; Voice)
- Brajira: Nobuo Tobita (飛田 展男, Tobita Nobuo; Voice)
- Yogoshimacritein: Kiyoyuki Yanada (梁田 清之, Yanada Kiyoyuki; Voice)
- Dagon: Akio Ōtsuka (大塚 明夫, Ōtsuka Akio; Voice)
- Black Cross King: Akira Kamiya (神谷 明, Kamiya Akira; Voice)
- Tensouder Voice: Ikuya Sawaki (沢木 郁也, Sawaki Ikuya)
- Narration, Mobilate Voice, Gokai Sabre Voice, Gokai Gun Voice, Kirenger Voice, Red Falcon Voice, Zubaan Voice: Tomokazu Seki (関 智一, Seki Tomokazu)

== Production ==
On March 16, 2011, Toei released a statement concerning the effects the 2011 Tōhoku earthquake and tsunami have had on the filming schedule, and the film's release was postponed to June 11, 2011. A combination of all the main 35 Giant Robots, entirely done in CG, was planned to be included in the climactic scene of the movie, but it was ultimately not included in the theatrical cut.

== Theme song ==
- "Super Sentai Hero Getter ~ 199 ver." (スーパー戦隊 ヒーローゲッター〜199ver., Sūpā Sentai Hīrō Gettā ~ Hyakukyūjūkyū Bājon)
  - Lyrics: Shoko Fujibayashi & Naruhisa Arakawa
  - Composition: Kenichiro Ōishi
  - Arrangement: Project.R (Kenichiro Ōishi)
  - Artist: Project.R

== Reception ==
The film entered the number 2 in the Japanese box office behind Pirates of the Caribbean: On Stranger Tides and earned a total of ¥288,610,400 (approximately US$3.6 million) on its opening weekend and despite the competition from Pirates of the Caribbean: On Stranger Tides, X-Men: First Class, Thor, From Up on Poppy Hill, Cars 2, Transformers: Dark of the Moon, Harry Potter and the Deathly Hallows – Part 2 and Pokémon the Movie: Black—Victini and Reshiram and White—Victini and Zekrom during its theatrical run the film was a box office success with ¥11.4 billion.
