= Tensou Sentai Goseiger vs. Shinkenger: Epic on Ginmaku =

Japanese name
- Kanji: 天装戦隊ゴセイジャーVSシンケンジャー エピック on 銀幕
Transcriptions
- Revised Hepburn: Tensō Sentai Goseijā tai Shinkenjā Epikku on Ginmaku
- Directed by: Noboru Takemoto
- Written by: Kento Shimoyama
- Produced by: Hirashiro Takashi; Hideyuki Fukuhara; Takeyuki Suzuki; Hidefumi Matsuda; Naoya Kinoshita
- Starring: Yudai Chiba; Rika Sato; Kyousuke Hamao; Mikiho Niwa; Kento Ono; Tori Matsuzaka; Hiroki Aiba; Rin Takanashi; Shogo Suzuki; Suzuka Morita; Keisuke Sohma
- Cinematography: Fumio Matsumura
- Edited by: Ren Sato
- Music by: Kazunori Miyake; Hiroshi Takaki
- Production companies: Toei Company; TV Asahi; Toei Video; Toei Company; Kinoshita Komuten
- Distributed by: Toei Company
- Release date: January 22, 2011
- Running time: 62 minutes
- Country: Japan
- Language: Japanese
- Box office: US$4.04 million

Tensou Sentai Goseiger vs. Shinkenger: Epic on Ginmaku (天装戦隊ゴセイジャーVSシンケンジャー エピック on 銀幕, Tensō Sentai Goseijā tai Shinkenjā Epikku on Ginmaku) is a "versus" superhero film in the Super Sentai Series long-standing tradition of crossover films known collectively as the "VS Series". The film, released on January 22, 2011, features a meeting of the casts and characters of Tensou Sentai Goseiger and Samurai Sentai Shinkenger. The heroes of Kaizoku Sentai Gokaiger also make a cameo appearance in the film, their cameo explained in their show's 40th episode. The film was first announced on Toei's Twitter feed on October 21, 2010. The catchphrases for the movie are "Move out, Samurai! Take off, Angels!" (いざゆけ、侍! はばたけ、天使たち!, Iza yuke, samurai! Habatake, tenshi-tachi!) and "A samurai-angel collaboration no one has ever seen" (誰も見た事のないサムライ、天使のコラボレーション!!, Dare mo mita koto no nai samurai, tenshi no koraborēshon!!). This is the first Super Sentai VS entry released on Blu-ray, which was out on March 21, 2011, along with the DVD. The movie takes place between epics 32 and 33 with the events taking place on October 2, 2010.

== Plot ==
While running errands for his fellow Goseigers, Alata fights a Gedoushu group led by an Ayakashi called Madokodama, who overwhelm him until Alata receives aid from the Shinkengers' leader Takeru Shiba and Madokodama retreats. Believing his nemesis Doukoku Chimatsuri has returned, Takeru calls for his teammates to return as well and establishes a base at the Amachi Institute against Alata's wishes. After being rejoined by his mentor Hikoma Kusakabe and fellow Shinkenger Ryunosuke Ikenami, Takeru informs the Goseigers of the Gedoushu before helping them fight a returning Madokodama.

Chiaki Tani returns to aid the Shinkengers and Goseigers, but the Gedoushu's new leader and Doukoku's self-proclaimed heir, Buredoran of Chimatsuri, reveals himself and kidnaps Takeru. As Alata attempts to raise Ryunosuke and Chiaki's spirits, his team pick up Mako Shiraishi and Kotoha Hanaori. Due to several misunderstandings however, the Shinkengers are skeptical of the Goseigers. During a later fight with Buredoran's forces, the Sentai teams are shocked to discover Takeru has been brainwashed into serving him. After Alata gets injured taking an attack meant for the Shinkengers, Gosei Knight and Genta Umemori arrive to help them escape. In light of Madokodama's ability to redirect their elemental powers, Gosei Knight suggests the Goseigers should augment their attacks while the Shinkengers agree to help them further.

The next day, the two teams undergo training to combine their powers while Alata recovers and is met by Takeru's foster mother Kaoru Shiba, who provides a means of freeing him. As Buredoran prepares his plot to transfer the Sanzu River's waters to Gosei World, he is confronted by the Goseigers and Shinkengers, who free Takeru from his brainwashing and overpower Madokodama. Meanwhile, a lost DaiGoyou spots Shitari secretly preparing an army of Doukoku loyalists to ambush the Sentai teams and Buredoran before Shitari and his group are killed by the Gokaigers, who ask DaiGoyou not to reveal their presence.

After thwarting his plot, the Goseigers and Shinkengers battle an enlarged Buredoran and Madokodama with their mecha. They kill the latter and combine their powers to kill him. Following this, the two teams part ways on good terms.

== Cast ==
- Alata/Gosei Red: Yudai Chiba
- Eri/Gosei Pink: Rika Sato
- Agri/Gosei Black: Kyousuke Hamao
- Moune/Gosei Yellow: Mikiho Niwa
- Hyde/Gosei Blue: Kento Ono
- Nozomu Amachi: Sakuya Nakamura
- Professor Shuichiro Amachi: Louis Yamada LIII
- Gosei Knight: Katsuyuki Konishi (Voice)
- Datas: Kōki Miyata
- Buredoran: Nobuo Tobita
- Tensouder Voice: Ikuya Sawaki
- Takeru Shiba/Shinken Red: Tori Matsuzaka
- Ryunosuke Ikenami/Shinken Blue: Hiroki Aiba
- Mako Shiraishi/Shinken Pink: Rin Takanashi
- Chiaki Tani/Shinken Green: Shogo Suzuki
- Kotoha Hanaori/Shinken Yellow: Suzuka Morita
- Genta Umemori/Shinken Gold: Keisuke Sohma
- Kaoru Shiba: Runa Natsui
- Hikoma Kusakabe: Goro Ibuki
- DaiGoyou: Kōichi Tōchika (Voice)
- Shitari of the Bones: Chō (Voice)
- Madokodama: Tesshō Genda (Voice)
- Gokai Red (Captain Marvelous): Ryota Ozawa (Voice)
- Gokai Blue (Joe Gibken): Yuki Yamada (Voice)
- Gokai Yellow (Luka Millfy): Mao Ichimichi (Voice)
- Gokai Green (Don "Doc" Dogoier): Kazuki Shimizu (Voice)
- Gokai Pink (Ahim de Famille): Yui Koike (Voice)
- Mobirates Voice: Tomokazu Seki

== Theme song ==
- "Gotcha Ginmaku: Goseiger VS Shinkenger" (ガッチャ☆銀幕～ゴセイジャーVSシンケンジャー～, Gatcha Ginmaku ~Goseijā Bui Esu Shinkenjā~)
  - Lyrics: Shoko Fujibayashi
  - Composition: Takafumi Iwasaki
  - Arrangement: Project.R (Kenichiro Ōishi)
  - Artist: Hideyuki Takahashi
