= List of Tensou Sentai Goseiger characters =

Tensou Sentai Goseiger (天装戦隊ゴセイジャー, Tensō Sentai Goseijā) (Note: "Tensou" (天装, Tensō), when literally translated, means "Celestial Armament".) is a Japanese tokusatsu series that serves as the 34th installment in the Super Sentai franchise and the 22nd entry in the Heisei era. Much of the series takes inspiration from Japanese and Buddhist mythology in addition to western films for the antagonist factions.

== Main characters ==
=== Goseigers ===
The eponymous Goseigers are young members of the Gosei Angel (護星天使, Gosei Tenshi) race, humans born with mysterious powers who moved to the Gosei World (護星界, Goseikai) 10,000 years ago so as not to cause trouble for regular humans. Using the Heaven's Tower (天の塔, Ten no Tō) as a bridge between the dimensions, the Gosei Angels made it their mission to protect Earth. They are divided into three tribes: the optimistic Skick Tribe (スカイック族, Sukaikku Zoku) with power over the element of wind, the tough Landick Tribe (ランディック族, Randikku Zoku) with power over the element of earth, and the calm-headed Seaick Tribe (シーイック族, Shīikku Zoku) with power over the element of water.

To carry out their mission, the Gosei Angels use the mystical Gosei Power (ゴセイパワー, Gosei Pawā) sealed away in Gosei Cards that are stored in the Gosei Buckles (ゴセイバックル, Gosei Bakkuru). The tiki-like Tensouder (テンソウダー, Tensōdā) device allows them to transform and perform Tensou Techniques. Additionally, each member carries a Gosei Blaster (ゴセイブラスター, Gosei Burasutā) sidearm, which allows them to perform varying Bullet (バレット, Baretto) attacks after combining with a Gosei Headder, and wield unique Gosei Weapons (ゴセイウェポン, Gosei Uepon), which they can either use to perform the Gosei Super Sonic (ゴセイスーパーソニック, Gosei Sūpā Sonikku) team attack or combine to form the Gosei Buster (ゴセイバスター, Gosei Basutā) composed of the Sky Buster (スカイバスター, Sukai Basutā), the Skick Goseigers' combined weapons, and the Land-Sea Buster (ランドシーバスター, Rando Shī Basutā), the Landick Goseigers and Gosei Blue's combined weapons.

The Goseigers later acquire the Miracle Gosei Headders and Gosei Tenswords (ゴセイテンソード, Gosei Tensōdo), which allow them to become the armored Super Goseigers (スーパーゴセイジャー, Sūpā Goseijā). With their Gosei Tenswords, they can perform either standalone Super Dynamic (スーパーイダイナミック, Sūpā Dainamikku) finishers, the combined Super Sky-Land-Sea Dynamic (スーパースカイランドシーダイナミック, Sūpā Sukai Rando Shī Dainamikku) finisher, or the Super Sky-Land-Sea-Knight Dynamic (スーパースカイランドシーナイトダイナミック, Sūpā Sukai Rando Shī Naito Dainamikku) finisher with Gosei Knight's Dynamic Leon Laser. They can also combine their Gosei Tenswords and Tensouders to form the Super Tenswords (スーパーテンソード, Sūpā Tensōdo).

In the crossover film Gokaiger Goseiger Super Sentai 199 Hero Great Battle, the Goseigers and Gokaigers use the power of their 33 Super Sentai predecessors to summon the Super Sentai Bazooka (スーパー戦隊バズーカ, Sūpā Sentai Bazūka).

==== Alata ====
Alata (アラタ, Arata) is a male Skick Tribe representative and the partner of his childhood friend Eri who possesses the innate ability to see the true essence of things. Like Eri, he has a cheerful and positive personality. Unlike her, Alata is ten times more sensitive to the wind and can easily pick up and track evil around the area. Whenever he is in a pinch, he never gives up and fights his way through. Alata truly believes in protecting the Earth and everyone. He is also the first to befriend and truly trust Nozomu. However, despite being a strong leader for the group, Alata is usually an airhead who often does things before thinking about them.

As Gosei Red (ゴセイレッド, Gosei Reddo), Alata wields the Skick Sword (スカイックソード, Sukaikku Sōdo), which allows him to perform either the Red Break (レッドブレイク, Reddo Bureiku) attack on his own or the Red Dynamic (レッドダイナミック, Reddo Dainamikku) attack with help from the other Goseigers.

Alata is portrayed by Yudai Chiba (千葉 雄大, Chiba Yūdai). As a child, he is portrayed by Yusuke Akiyama (秋山 悠介, Akiyama Yūsuke).

==== Eri ====
Eri (エリ) is a female Skick Tribe representative and the partner of her childhood friend Alata who is the most maternal of the group and optimistic about life. She excels in assessing situations and is a very bold fighter. Her personality is that of a cheerful and bubbly girl, as she always thinks positively and never gives up. However, Eri lacks common sense and often clashes with her teammates, especially Moune, due to her capriciousness and being an airhead.

As Gosei Pink (ゴセイピンク, Gosei Pinku), Eri wields the Skick Shot (スカイックショット, Sukaikku Shotto), which allows her to perform the Pink Trick (ピンクトリック, Pinku Torikku) attack. In the crossover films Tensou Sentai Goseiger vs. Shinkenger: Epic on Ginmaku and Gokaiger Goseiger Super Sentai 199 Hero Great Battle, she performs the Pink Double Attack (ピンクダブルアタック, Pinku Daburu Atakku) with Shinken Pink and the Pink Double Attack Part 2 (ピンクダブルアタックパート２, Pinku Daburu Atakku Pāto Tsū) with Gokai Pink respectively.

Eri is portrayed by Rika Sato (さとう 里香, Satō Rika). As a child, she is portrayed by Mutsumi Aou (栗生 睦未, Aō Mutsumi).

==== Agri ====
Agri (アグリ, Aguri) is a male Landick Tribe representative and the partner of his younger sister Moune who is the most hot-blooded of the group. He likes to act cool and prides himself on being the strongest fighter out of the five Goseigers.

As Gosei Black (ゴセイブラック, Gosei Burakku), Agri wields the Landick Axe (ランディックアックス, Randikku Akkusu), which allows him to perform the Black Attack (ブラックアタック, Burakku Atakku).

Agri is portrayed by Kyousuke Hamao (浜尾 京介, Hamao Kyōsuke).

==== Moune ====
Moune (モネ, Mone) is a female Landick Tribe representative and the partner of her older brother Agri who is the youngest member of the group. Despite having a childish nature about her, Moune has a very strict nature, which often clashes with Eri's capricious nature, though she can also be loving and always sticks to the battle ahead.

As Gosei Yellow (ゴセイイエロー, Gosei Ierō), Moune wields the Landick Claw (ランディッククロー, Randikku Kurō), which allows her to perform the Yellow Shock (イエローショック, Ierō Shokku) attack.

Moune is portrayed by Mikiho Niwa (にわ みきほ, Niwa Mikiho).

==== Hyde ====
Hyde (ハイド, Haido) is the lone Seaick Tribe representative after the death of his partner Magis who is the oldest member of the group. Wise and usually calm, he often pays very close attention to every detail, no matter how trivial. Hyde also serves in keeping the team together.

As Gosei Blue (ゴセイブルー, Gosei Burū), Hyde wields the Seaick Bowgun (シーイックボウガン, Shīikku Bōgan), which allows him to perform the Blue Check (ブルーチェック, Burū Chekku) attack.

Hyde is portrayed by Kento Ono (小野 健斗, Ono Kento).

=== Gosei Knight ===
Gosei Knight (ゴセイナイト, Gosei Naito) is a mysterious silver-colored warrior of which the Gosei World has no record. Ten thousand years ago, he was originally the lion-themed Groundion Headder (グランディオンヘッダー, Gurandion Heddā) and battled the Yuumajuu alongside Brajira until they got separated. Ending up in a glacier, Groundion made a pact with the Earth itself, which granted him the means to transform into a humanoid form to fight the revived Yuumajuu and cleanse the Earth of any threat to it. Gosei Knight's motivations initially put him at odds with the current Goseigers, as he does not care for Earth's inhabitants who pollute the planet. Over time however, he comes to realize the Goseigers share his mission and works alongside them to defeat the Yuumajuu.

When the Matrintis Empire attacks, Gosei Knight's life force starts to dwindle, leaving him unsure of whether he should continue fighting alongside the Goseigers. After Nozomu helps him realize humans have the potential to redeem themselves and protect the planet, Gosei Knight renews his resolve to support the Goseigers in their battles.

However, Brajira resurfaces and captures Gosei Knight in order to use the latter's Final Power for his Earth Salvation Plan. Using his Dark Gosei Power, Brajira reprograms Gosei Knight into Dark Gosei Knight of the Groundion Headder (グランディオンヘッダーのダーク・ゴセイナイト, Gurandion Heddā no Dāku Gosei Naito) to serve him, but Alata uses his Gosei Power to expel the dark energy in Gosei Knight and replenish that of his ally's. Following Brajira's defeat, Gosei Knight leaves to rest and regain his full power.

During the events of the series Kaizoku Sentai Gokaiger, Gosei Knight supports the Goseigers and their Super Sentai predecessors during the Legend War before they sacrifice their powers to defeat Zangyack's first invasion force. In Gokaiger Goseiger Super Sentai 199 Hero Great Battle, Gosei Knight briefly regains his powers to help the Goseigers and Gokaigers fight the Black Cross King.

Unlike the Goseigers, Gosei Knight possesses the mysterious Knightick Power (ナイティックパワー, Naitikku Pawā), which allows him to utilize all three of Gosei World's tribal elements. He can also switch between his humanoid and Groundion Headder forms via the Leon Cellular (レオンセルラー, Reon Serurā) device, which like the Tensouder allows him to perform Tensou Techniques. In battle, he wields the Leon Laser (レオンレイザー, Reon Reizā) sidearm, which can either be reconfigured into the Leon Laser Sword (レオンレイザーソード, Reon Reizā Sōdo) and perform the Knight Metallic (ナイトメタリック, Naito Metarikku) attack or combine with the Leon Cellular and Vulcan Headder to form the Dynamic Leon Laser (ダイナミックレオンレイザー, Dainamikku Reon Reizā). With the Super Goseigers, Gosei Knight can perform the Miracle Gosei Knight Dynamic (ミラクルゴセイナイトダイナミック, Mirakuru Gosei Naito Dainamikku) finisher.

As the Groundion Headder, Gosei Knight can combine with a haul truck body to transform into Groundion (グランディオン, Gurandion), which forms the head, torso, and arms of Gosei Ground. As Groundion, he can perform the Groundion Eraser (グランディオンイレイザー, Gurandion Ireizā) attack.

Gosei Knight is voiced by Katsuyuki Konishi (小西 克幸, Konishi Katsuyuki).

=== Gosei Cards ===
The Gosei Cards (ゴセイカード, Gosei Kādo) allow the Goseigers and Gosei Knight to perform Tensou Techniques (天装術, Tensō Jutsu) when used in conjunction with a Tensouder and/or the Leon Cellular, with each member possessing their own copy. In Gosei Knight's case, scanning his Gosei Cards into the Leon Cellular is accompanied by him inputting a three digit code into the device. The Gosei Angels can only use the cards associated with their respective tribe while Gosei Knight has the ability to use all three elements via the Knightick Power. In the crossover film Tensou Sentai Goseiger vs. Shinkenger: Epic on Ginmaku, the Goseigers train alongside the Shinkengers to combine their Tensou Techniques and Modikara in order to fight against the resurfaced Gedoushu and the Ayakashi Makodama, who has the ability to counteract the Goseigers' abilities.

- Change (チェンジ, Chenji): Allows the Gosei Angels to transform into Goseigers and/or Gosei Knight to transform into the Groundion Headder and vice versa.
  - Super Change (スーパーチェンジ, Sūpā Chenji): Allows the Gosei Angels to transform directly into Super Goseigers. A Super Modikara Power (スーパーモヂカラパワー, Sūpā Mojikara Pawā) version of this card appears in the crossover film Tensou Sentai Goseiger vs. Shinkenger: Epic on Ginmaku, which allows the Shinkengers to transform into Super Shinkengers without the Inromaru.
- Summon (サモン, Samon): Allows the Goseigers to summon the Gosei Weapons, Gosei Headders, and Gosei Machines and/or Gosei Knight to summon the Vulcan Headder and Knight Brothers.
  - Miracle Gosei Power (ミラクルゴセイパワー, Mirakuru Gosei Pawā): Summons the Gosei Tenswords.
  - Ultimate Power (アルティメットパワー, Arutimetto Pawā): Summons Gosei Ultimate.
  - Wonder Power (ワンダーパワー, Wandā Pawā): Summons Gosei Wonder. This card first appears in the film Tensou Sentai Goseiger: Epic on the Movie.
- Dynamic (ダイナミック, Dainamikku): Initiates the Goseigers and Gosei Knight's finishers.
  - Gosei Dynamic (ゴセイダイナミック, Gosei Dainamikku): Initiates the Goseigers' eponymous finisher when used in conjunction with the Gosei Buster.
  - Land-Sea Dynamic (ランドシーダイナミック, Rando Shī Dainamikku): Initiates the Landick Goseigers and Gosei Blue's eponymous finisher when used in conjunction with the Land-Sea Buster.
  - Knight Dynamic (ナイトダイナミック, Naito Dainamikku): Initiates Gosei Knight's eponymous finisher when used in conjunction with the Dynamic Leon Laser.
  - Miracle Gosei Dynamic (ミラクルゴセイダイナミック, Mirakuru Gosei Dainamikku): Initiates the Super Goseigers' eponymous finisher when used in conjunction with the Super Tenswords.
  - Sky Dynamic (スカイダイナミック, Sukai Dainamikku): Initiates the Skick Goseigers' eponymous finisher when used in conjunction with the Sky Buster and/or Gosei Red's Red Dynamic when used in conjunction with the Skick Sword.
- Combine (コンバイン, Konbain): Combines the Goseigers' personal Gosei Machines to form Gosei Great and/or Groundion and the Knight Brothers to form Gosei Ground.
  - Dual Combine (デュアルコンバイン, Dyuaru Konbain): Combines Gosei Great with either Datas Hyper and the Skick, Landick, and Seaick Brothers to form Hyper Gosei Great or Gosei Ground to form Ground Gosei Great.
  - Ultimate Combine (アルティメットコンバイン, Arutimetto Konbain): Combines Gosei Great and Gosei Ultimate to form Ultimate Gosei Great.
  - Wonder Combine (ワンダーコンバイン, Wandā Konbain): Combines Gosei Wonder and its corresponding Gosei Machines to form Wonder Gosei Great. This card first appears in the film Tensou Sentai Goseiger: Epic on the Movie.
  - Miracle Combine (ミラクルコンバイン, Mirakuru Konbain): Combines Gosei Great, Datas Hyper, the Groundion Headder, and the Skick, Landick, Seaick, and Knight Brothers to form Ground Hyper Gosei Great. This card appears exclusively in the crossover film Tensou Sentai Goseiger vs. Shinkenger: Epic on Ginmaku.
- Charge (チャージ, Chāji): Initiates the Tensou Giants' finishers.
  - Victory Charge (ビクトリーチャージ, Bikutorī Chāji): Initiates Gosei Great and Gosei Ground's finishers.
  - Ultimate Charge (アルティメットチャージ, Arutimetto Chāji): Initiates Gosei Ultimate's finisher.
  - Wonder Charge (ワンダーチャージ, Wandā Chāji): Initiates Wonder Gosei Great's finisher. This card first appears in the film Tensou Sentai Goseiger: Epic on the Movie.
  - Modikara Victory Charge (モヂカラビクトリーチャージ, Mojikara Bikutorī Chāji): Initiates Ground Hyper Gosei Great's finisher. This card appears exclusively in the crossover film Tensou Sentai Goseiger vs. Shinkenger: Epic on Ginmaku.
- Outbreak (アウトブレイク, Autobureiku): An enhancement card type.
  - Invisibreeze (インビジブリーズ, Inbijiburīzu): A Skick Power (スカイックパワー, Sukaikku Pawā) card that turns the user into a whirlwind to move without being detected.
  - Waterlens (ウォーターレンズ, Wotārensu): A Seaick Power (シーイックパワー, Shīikku Pawā) card that clears any form of interference, interstellar or otherwise.
  - Roplant (ロープラント, Rōpuranto): A Landick Power (ランディックパワー, Randikku Pawā) card that produces ivy from the ground to ensnare a target.
- Splash (スプラッシュ, Supurasshu): An elemental card type.
  - Presshower (プレッシャワー, Puresshawā): A Seaick Power card that summons several jets of water from the ground.
  - Windrive (ウィンドライブ, Windoraibu): A Skick Power card that allows the user to bring another object or person to him or her via a whirlwind.
  - Istop (アイストップ, Aisutoppu): A Seaick Power card that blasts a frost cone capable of freezing anything in its path.
  - Freezedrive (フリーズドライブ, Furīzudoraibu): A Knightick Power card that blasts a frost cone capable of freeze-drying anything in its path. Its effects can be duplicated through the simultaneous use of the Windrive and Istop cards.
- Expand (イクスパンド, Ikusupando): A spell card type.
  - Defenstorm (ディフェンストーム, Difensutōmu): A Skick Power card that summons a wall of wind.
  - Defenstone (ディフェンストーン, Difensutōn): A Landick Power card that summons a wall of stones.
  - Defenstream (ディフェンストリーム, Difensutorīmu): A Seaick Power card that summons a wall of water.
  - Memoryfly (メモリーフライ, Memorīfurai), Memorybury (メモリーベリー, Memorīberī), and Memorywash (メモリーウォッシュ, Memorīwosshu): A set of Skick, Landick, and Seaick Power cards respectively that the Gosei Angels use to erase people's memories of them.
  - Reflecloud (リフレクラウド, Rifurekuraudo), Reflequartz (リフレクォーツ, Rifurekuōtzu), and Refleclear (リフレクリア, Rifurekuria): A set of Skick, Landick, and Seaick Power cards respectively that all share shielding abilities. These cards appear exclusively in the crossover film Kamen Rider × Super Sentai: Super Hero Taisen where they are used by Kamen Riders Decade, Ryuki, and Blade respectively.
- Explosion (エクスプロージョン, Ekusupurōjon): An elemental attack card type.
  - Rockrush (ロックラッシュ, Rokkurasshu): A Landick Power card that lifts up giant rocks from the ground.
  - Twistornado (ツイストルネード, Tsuisutorunēdo): A Skick Power card that summons a large transparent whirlwind.
  - Kaentornado (カエントルネード, Kaentorunēdo): A Modikara Skick Power (モヂカラスカイックパワー, Mojikara Sukaikku Pawā) card created from Kaoru Shiba's Modikara that imbues the user's attacks with the element of fire. This card appears exclusively in the crossover film Tensou Sentai Goseiger vs. Shinkenger: Epic on Ginmaku.
- Focus (フォーカス, Fōkasu): A perception-affecting card type.
  - Camoumirage (カモミラージュ, Kamomirāju): A Seaick Power card that allows the user to assume a disguise.
  - Trianglobal (トライアングローバル, Toraiangurōbaru): A Knightick Power card that merges Skick, Landick, and Seaick Tribe energies. Its effects can be duplicated through the simultaneous use of the Twistornado, Sparquake, and Presshower cards.
- Spark (スパーク, Supāku): A thunder element card type.
  - Comprethunder (コンプレッサンダー, Konpuressandā): A Skick Power card that summons a storm cloud capable of firing lightning bolts.
  - Sparquake (スパークェイク, Supākweiku): A Landick Power card that produces electricity from vibrations in the ground.

=== Gosei Headders and Gosei Machines ===
The Gosei Headders (ゴセイヘッダー, Gosei Heddā) are living head-like items that help the Goseigers, serving only those who share their common attributes. Normally dormant on Headder Island (ヘッダーアイランド, Heddā Airando), the Goseigers can call upon them with their Gosei Cards. Groups of Headders that are summoned together from different tribes are usually known as Brothers (ブラザー, Burazā). The Goseigers can also summon robotic bodies for the Headders to attach onto, turning them into the Gosei Machines (ゴセイマシン, Gosei Mashin). Using the Ptera and Tyranno Headders at once allow Gosei Pink and Yellow to perform the Ultimate Dinosaur Trick (最強恐竜トリック, Saikyō Kyōryū Torikku) finisher, also known as the Dinosaur Bullet (ダイナソーバレット, Dainasō Baretto), while using the Taka, Crow, Kuwaga, Sai, and Sawshark Headders at once allow all five Goseigers to perform the Sky-Land-Sea Bullet (スカイランドシーバレット, Sukai Rando Shī Baretto) finisher.

- Dragon Headder (ドラゴンヘッダー, Doragon Heddā): Gosei Red's personal Headder that allows him to perform the Dragon Bullet (ドラゴンバレット, Doragon Baretto) attack. After combining with an airliner body, it transforms into Gosei Dragon (ゴセイドラゴン, Gosei Doragon), gaining the use of missiles and fire breath, which forms the head and torso of Gosei Great.
- Phoenix Headder (フェニックスヘッダー, Fenikkusu Heddā): Gosei Pink's personal Headder that allows her to perform the Phoenix Bullet (フェニックスバレット, Fenikkusu Baretto) attack. After combining with a fighter aircraft body, it transforms into Gosei Phoenix (ゴセイフェニックス, Gosei Fenikkusu), gaining the use of the Phoenix Beam, which forms the left arm of Gosei Great.
- Snake Headder (スネークヘッダー, Sunēku Heddā): Gosei Black's personal Headder that allows him to perform the Snake Bullet (スネークバレット, Sunēku Baretto) attack. After combining with a Shinkansen body, it transforms into Gosei Snake (ゴセイスネーク, Gosei Sunēku), which forms the waist, right leg, and upper left leg of Gosei Great.
- Tiger Headder (タイガーヘッダー, Taigā Heddā): Gosei Yellow's personal Headder that allows her to perform the Tiger Bullet (タイガーバレット, Taigā Baretto) attack. After combining with a bulldozer body, it transforms into Gosei Tiger (ゴセイタイガー, Gosei Taigā), which forms the lower left leg of Gosei Great.
- Shark Headder (シャークヘッダー, Shāku Heddā): Gosei Blue's personal Headder that allows him to perform the Shark Bullet (シャークバレット, Shāku Baretto) attack. After combining with a submarine body, it transforms into Gosei Shark (ゴセイシャーク, Gosei Shāku), gaining the use of torpedoes, which forms the right arm of Gosei Great.
- Seaick Brothers (シーイックブラザー, Shīikku Burazā): A trio of aquatic animal-themed Headders consisting of the Manta Headder (マンタヘッダー, Manta Heddā), the Sawshark Headder (ソーシャークヘッダー, Sōshāku Heddā), and the Hammershark Headder (ハンマーシャークヘッダー, Hanmāshāku Heddā). When used alongside the Shark Headder, they allow Gosei Blue and three other Goseigers to perform the Seaick Bullet (シーイックバレット, Shīikku Baretto) finisher.
- Landick Brothers (ランディックブラザー, Randikku Burazā): A trio of terrestrial animal-themed Headders consisting of the Kuwaga Headder (クワガヘッダー, Kuwaga Heddā), the Sai Headder (サイヘッダー, Sai Heddā), and the Tyranno Headder (ティラノヘッダー, Tirano Heddā) that can perform the Landick Brothers Attack (ランディックブラザーアタック, Randikku Burazā Atakku). When used alongside the Snake and Tiger Headders, they allow the Goseigers to perform the Landick Bullet (ランディックバレット, Randikku Baretto) finisher.
- Exotic Brothers (エキゾチックブラザー, Ekizochikku Burazā): A quartet of Headders resembling differently colored Dragon Headders in aqua, purple, orange, and chartreuse. They appeared only once as a result of Alata's Tensou Techniques being affected by Fandaho of the Nonsense and disappeared once the alien was destroyed.
- Skick Brothers (スカイックブラザー, Sukaikku Burazā): A trio of flying animal-themed Headders consisting of the Taka Headder (タカヘッダー, Taka Heddā), the Crow Headder (クロウヘッダー, Kurō Heddā), and the Ptera Headder (プテラヘッダー, Putera Heddā) that can perform the Skick Tornado (スカイックトルネード, Sukaikku Torunēdo) attack. When used alongside the Dragon and Phoenix Headders, they allow the Goseigers to perform the Skick Bullet (スカイックバレット, Sukaikku Baretto) finisher.
- Hyper Change Headder (ハイパーチェンジヘッダー, Haipā Chenji Heddā): A bullet-themed Headder that transforms Datas into Datas Hyper.
- Mystic Brothers (ミスティックブラザー, Misutikku Burazā): A duo consisting of the green ostrich-themed Mystic Runner (ミスティックランナー, Misutikku Rannā) mecha and the two-in-one Egg Headder (エッグヘッダー, Eggu Heddā), the latter of which doubles as a soccer ball.
- Vulcan Headder (バルカンヘッダー, Barukan Heddā): A lion/Gatling gun-themed Headder that increases the Leon Laser's firepower.
- Knight Brothers (ナイトブラザー, Naito Burazā): A duo of lion-themed Gosei Machines consisting of the blue cruise ship-themed Sealeon (シーレオン, Shīreon) and the red blimp-themed Skyon (スカイオン, Sukaion), which form the respective right and left legs of Gosei Ground.
- Miracle Gosei Headders (ミラクルゴセイヘッダー, Mirakuru Gosei Heddā): A series of golden Headders that allow the Goseigers to become Super Goseigers and can combine with Gosei Ultimate.
  - Miracle Dragon Headder (ミラクルドラゴンヘッダー, Mirakuru Doragon Heddā): Owing to its vast power, the Miracle Dragon Headder gained a fearsome reputation and was originally known as the Abare Headder (アバレヘッダー, Abare Heddā). Brajira attempts to use it against the Goseigers, but Gosei Red bonds with the Headder, convincing it to assume its true form and become Super Gosei Red's personal Miracle Headder.
  - Miracle Phoenix Headder (ミラクルフェニックスヘッダー, Mirakuru Fenikkusu Heddā): Super Gosei Pink's personal Miracle Headder.
  - Miracle Snake Headder (ミラクルスネークヘッダー, Mirakuru Sunēku Heddā): Super Gosei Black's personal Miracle Headder.
  - Miracle Tiger Headder (ミラクルタイガーヘッダー, Mirakuru Taigā Heddā): Super Gosei Yellow's personal Miracle Headder.
  - Miracle Shark Headder (ミラクルシャークヘッダー, Mirakuru Shāku Heddā): Super Gosei Blue's personal Miracle Headder.
- Gosei Ultimate (ゴセイアルティメット, Gosei Arutimetto): A Gosei Machine originally intended to be the foundation of the new Heaven's Tower that combines the Miracle Gosei Headders' powers and possesses the ability to travel between dimensions. It can also change from its flying vehicle-like Machine Mode (マシンモード, Mashin Mōdo) to a humanoid form via Tensou Transformation (天装変形, Tensō Henkei) where it dual wields the twin Ultimate Swords (アルティメットソード, Arutimetto Sōdo). Its finisher is the Ultimate Strike (アルティメットストライク, Arutimetto Sutoraiku). While the Super Goseigers primarily pilot Gosei Ultimate themselves, Master Head can also remotely operate it.
- Gosei Wonder (ゴセイワンダー, Gosei Wandā): A blue jet-themed Gosei Machine consisting of five Headders that can separate into five Gosei Machines. This Gosei Machine first appears in the film Tensou Sentai Goseiger: Epic on the Movie
  - Bird Headder (バードヘッダー, Bādo Heddā): The main component of Gosei Wonder that attaches itself to the eagle-themed Gosei Bird (ゴセイバード, Gosei Bādo), piloted by Gosei Red, which carries the rest of Gosei Wonder's Headders and forms the head and torso of Wonder Gosei Great.
  - Kabuto Headder (カブトヘッダー, Kabuto Heddā): A rhinoceros beetle-themed Headder that can combine with a fighter aircraft body to transform into Gosei Kabuto (ゴセイカブト, Gosei Kabuto), piloted by Gosei Pink, which forms the left arm of Wonder Gosei Great.
  - Crocodile Headder (クロコダイルヘッダー, Kurokodairu Heddā): A namesake-themed Headder that can combine with a Shinkansen body to transform into Gosei Crocodile (ゴセイクロコダイル, Gosei Kurokodairu), piloted by Gosei Black, which forms the waist, right leg, and upper left leg of Wonder Gosei Great.
  - Elephant Headder (エレファントヘッダー, Erefanto Heddā): A namesake-themed Headder that can combine with a bulldozer body to transform into Gosei Elephant (ゴセイエレファント, Gosei Erefanto), piloted by Gosei Yellow, which forms the lower left leg of Wonder Gosei Great.
  - Dolphin Headder (ドルフィンヘッダー, Dorufin Heddā): A namesake-themed Headder that can combine with a submarine body to transform into Gosei Dolphin (ゴセイドルフィン, Gosei Dorufin), piloted by Gosei Blue, which forms the right arm of Wonder Gosei Great.

==== Tensou Giants ====
The Tensou Giants (天装巨人, Tensō Kyojin) are giant robots formed by the combination of Gosei Headders and Gosei Machines through Tensou Combinations (天装合体, Tensō Gattai).

- Gosei Great (ゴセイグレート, Gosei Gurēto): The Goseigers' first Tensou Giant composed of the five main Gosei Machines that wields the Dragon Sword (ドラゴンソード, Doragon Sōdo). Its finisher is the Great Strike (グレートストライク, Gurēto Sutoraiku).
  - Seaick Gosei Great (シーイックゴセイグレート, Shī'ikku Gosei Gurēto): A combination of Gosei Great and the Seaick Brothers that grants analytical capabilities and arm-mounted weapons. Its finisher is the Seaick Strike (シーイックストライク, Shīikku Sutoraiku).
  - Landick Gosei Great (ランディックゴセイグレート, Randikku Gosei Gurēto): A combination of Gosei Great and the Landick Brothers that grants increased speed and leg-mounted weapons. Its finisher is the Landick Strike (ランディックストライク, Randikku Sutoraiku).
  - Exotic Gosei Great (エキゾチックゴセイグレート, Ekizochikku Gosei Gurēto): A combination of Gosei Great and the Exotic Brothers that grants increased defensive capabilities. Its finisher is the Exotic Strike (エキゾチックストライク, Ekizochikku Sutoraiku).
  - Skick Gosei Great (スカイックゴセイグレート, Sukaikku Gosei Gurēto): A combination of Gosei Great and the Skick Brothers that grants aerial combat proficiency and wing-mounted sonic weapons. Its finisher is the Skick Strike (スカイックストライク, Sukaikku Sutoraiku).
  - Hyper Gosei Great (ハイパーゴセイグレート, Haipā Gosei Gurēto): A combination of Gosei Great, Datas Hyper, and the Skick, Landick, and Seaick Brothers. Its finisher is the Hyper Headder Strike (ハイパーヘッダーストライク, Haipā Heddā Sutoraiku).
  - Mystic Gosei Great (ミスティックゴセイグレート, Misutikku Gosei Gurēto): A combination of Gosei Great and the Mystic Brothers that uses the latter as a left shoulder-mounted flail. Its finisher is the Mystic Strike (ミスティックストライク, Misutikku Sutoraiku).
  - Ground Gosei Great (グランドゴセイグレート, Gurando Gosei Gurēto): A combination of Gosei Great and Gosei Ground that wields the Gosei Lancer (ゴセイランサー, Gosei Ransā) lance, which can switch between using the Kuwaga, Manta, and Taka Headders to perform enhanced elemental attacks. Its finisher is the Ground Great Strike (グランドグレートストライク, Gurando Gurēto Sutoraiku).
  - Ultimate Gosei Great (アルティメットゴセイグレート, Arutimetto Gosei Gurēto): A combination of Gosei Great and Gosei Ultimate that grants a flight boost and the use of the Ultimate Swords, which can combine into a bow. Its finisher is the Ultimate Great Strike (アルティメットグレートストライク, Arutimetto Gurēto Sutoraiku).
  - Sky-Land-Sea Gosei Great (スカイランドシーゴセイグレート, Sukai Rando Shī Gosei Gurēto): A hastily made combination of Gosei Great, the Landick Brothers, and the Taka, Sawshark, and Hammershark Headders. Its finisher is the Sky-Land-Sea Strike (スカイランドシーストライク, Sukai Rando Shī Sutoraiku).
  - Ground Hyper Gosei Great (グランドハイパーゴセイグレート, Gurando Haipā Gosei Gurēto): The Miracle Tensou Combination (ミラクル天装合体, Mirakuru Tensō Gattai) of Gosei Great, Datas Hyper, the Groundion Headder, and the Skick, Landick, Seaick, and Knight Brothers. Its finisher is the Modikara Headder Strike (モヂカラヘッダーストライク, Mojikara Heddā Sutoraiku). This combination appears exclusively in the crossover film Tensou Sentai Goseiger vs. Shinkenger: Epic on Ginmaku.
- Gosei Ground (ゴセイグランド, Gosei Gurando): Gosei Knight's personal Tensou Giant composed of Groundion and the Knight Brothers that, in addition to physical attacks, can fire Eraser Missiles (イレイザーミサイル, Ireizā Misairu). Its finisher is the GrounDrastic (グランドラスティック, Gurandorasutikku).
- Wonder Gosei Great (ワンダーゴセイグレート, Wandā Gosei Gurēto): The Goseigers' second Tensou Giant composed of Gosei Wonder and its corresponding Gosei Machines that wields the Gosei Bird Axe (ゴセイバードアックス, Gosei Bādo Akkusu). Its finisher is the Wonderful Strike (ワンダフルストライク, Wandafuru Sutoraiku). This combination first appears in the film Tensou Sentai Goseiger: Epic on the Movie.

== Recurring characters ==
=== Gosei World ===
==== Master Head ====
Master Head (マスターヘッド, Masutā Heddo) is the leader of Gosei World and the Goseigers' contact to their home world who provides them with information to fight Warstar and later the Yuumajuu. To help the Goseigers defeat the latter, Master Head sacrifices himself to provide them with Gosei Ultimate. However, his spirit endures and ends up in another dimension. Playing a role in giving Gosei Knight the power to help the Goseigers defeat the Matrintis Empire, Master Head reveals himself when he temporarily possesses Professor Amachi to give the Goseigers insight about the Yuumajuu's sealing and Brajira. During the execution of Brajira's Nega End, Master Head possesses Gosei Ultimate in a vain attempt to halt the wedges alongside Gosei Ground and Datas Hyper.

Master Head is voiced by Ikuya Sawaki (沢木 郁也, Sawaki Ikuya), who also voices the Tensouder, and serves as the series' narrator.

==== Datas ====
Datas (データス, Dētasu) is a Super Sentai Battle: Dice-O arcade machine-esque support robot that Master Head sent to Earth prior to the destruction of the Heaven's Tower to serve as an emergency system and means for communication between Gosei World and Earth. Usually sleeping when not needed, he can also pinpoint the likely location of villain activity.

When facing giant-sized monsters, Datas is capable of enlarging and combining with the Hyper Change Headder to become a Tensou Giant called Datas Hyper (データスハイパー, Dētasu Haipā) via Hyper Change (ハイパーチェンジ, Haipā Chenji). In battle, he specializes in boxing attacks, such as the Datas Punch (データスパンチ, Dētasu Panchi) and the Hyper Uppercut (ハイパーアッパーカット, Haipā Appākatto). His finisher is the Datas Dynamic Crash (データスダイナミッククラッシュ, Dētasu Dainamikku Kurasshu).

- Mystic Datas Hyper (ミスティックデータスハイパー, Misutikku Dētasu Haipā): A combination of Datas Hyper and the Mystic Brothers that grants flight capabilities and the ability to fire energy bullets.

Datas is voiced by Kōki Miyata (宮田 幸季, Miyata Kōki).

=== Amachi Astronomical Institute ===
The Amachi Astronomical Institute (天知天文研究所, Amachi Tenmon Kenkyūjō) is the home of the Goseigers' friend Nozomu and his father Professor Shuichirou Amachi, whom the Goseigers work for part-time.

==== Nozomu Amachi ====
Nozomu Amachi (天知(あまち) 望(のぞむ), Amachi Nozomu) is a grade four student and Alata's good friend. He first meets Alata when the Goseiger stops a baby carriage from rolling down a flight of stairs. After their first encounter, Alata leaves to rejoin his teammates, but forgets his Change Card, which Nozomu returns later during the Goseigers' first fight with Warstar's forces. While the Goseigers are meant to keep their existence a secret, Alata convinces his teammates not to erase Nozomu's memory. Following this, Nozomu becomes a close ally to the Goseigers amidst their later battles with Warstar, the Yuumajuu, the Matrintis Empire, and Brajira.

Nozomu is portrayed by Sakuya Nakamura (中村 咲哉, Nakamura Sakuya).

==== Shuichirou Amachi ====
Shuichirou Amachi (天知(あまち) 秀一郎(しゅういちろう), Amachi Shūichirō) is an amateur astronomer who runs the Amachi Institute, Nozomu's father, and only present parent as his wife Hiroko (裕子, Hiroko) works away from home and rarely comes home. He hires the Goseigers as part-time workers, unaware of their actions. Regardless, Amachi aids them on certain occasions and eventually learns the truth about the Gosei Angels from Master Head after agreeing to be the latter's medium.

Shuichirou is portrayed by Louis Yamada LIII (山田ルイ53世, Yamada Rui Gojūsan-sei), the tsukkomi of the Hige Danshaku (髭男爵, Hige Danshaku) manzai duo.

=== Wicked Souls ===
Unlike most Super Sentai installments, this series lacks a permanent antagonist faction as the Goseigers fight three different villain groups that appear one after another before Brajira rises up as the series' final antagonist. All of the villains in this series are named after popular films, with each faction representing different film genres. While they lack a collective name, the Goseigers referred to them as "wicked souls" (悪しき魂, ashiki tamashi) before they executed them in reference to their roles as Gosei Angels to punish the wicked.

==== Warstar ====
The Universal Annihilation Army Warstar (宇宙虐滅軍団ウォースター, Uchū Gyakumetsu Gundan Wōsutā; 1–16) are insect-themed aliens based in the Universal Mothership Indevader (宇宙母船インデベーダー, Uchū Bosen Indebēdā) who seek to steal the life force of other planets. After targeting Earth, they run afoul of the Goseigers. Their members' home worlds are anagrams of the type of Earth insect they are modeled after while all Warstar-related names are modifications of the Japanese names of American science fiction films.

===== Mons Drake =====
The Great King Mons Drake (大王モンス・ドレイク, Daiō Monsu Doreiku), also known as Mons Drake of the Planet (惑星のモンス・ドレイク, Wakusei no Monsu Doreiku), is a Mons Alien (モンス星人, Monsu Seijin) and the leader of Warstar. Before invading Earth, his new follower Brajira informs him of the Gosei Angels and the threat that they pose to his plans, so Mons Drake tasks Dereputa with destroying Heaven's Tower in an attempt to bar the Gosei Angels from Earth. Upon learning five Gosei Angels were on the planet at the time, Mons Drake orders his forces to stop them. Eventually, due to the Goseigers' constant interference, Mons Drake performs the Gravity Fall to make the Moon collide with Earth, only for the Goseigers to foil this plan and seemingly kill Dereputa. Following this, Mons Drake attempts to transfer Earth's oxygen into the Indevader and have it crash into the Earth to burn every human and enlarge himself to ensure the Goseigers cannot stop him, but the Goseigers blast him into the Indevader, which consumes Mons Drake in the resulting explosion.

In battle, Mons Drake wields the Drake Tomahawk (ドレイクトマホーク, Doreiku Tomahōku) and can perform the Planet Bullet (惑星弾, Wakusei Dan) and Syzygial Bullet (惑星直列弾, Wakusei Chokuretsu Dan) attacks. His most powerful technique is the Gravity Fall (引力落とし, Inryoku Otoshi) ceremony, wherein he uses stored dark matter in his body to cause a nearby natural satellite to impact the planet he is currently on.

Mons Drake is voiced by Shōzō Iizuka (飯塚 昭三, Iizuka Shōzō).

===== Dereputa =====
Dereputa of the Meteor (流星のデレプタ, Ryūsei no Dereputa) is a Zutinma Alien (ズティンマ星人, Zutinma Seijin) and a former foot soldier whose fighting spirit attracted the attention of Mons Drake, who promoted him to combat commander and his right hand. Dereputa personally destroys Heaven's Tower to facilitate Warstar's invasion, but is severely injured in battle with Alata and develops a vendetta against him. Dereputa goes on to fight the Goseigers until he is seemingly killed while helping Mons Drake enact the Gravity Fall. Narrowly surviving, Dereputa temporarily goes into hiding, realizing he needs to act alone to prove his superiority. Following Mons Drake's demise, Dereputa resurfaces to attack the Goseigers and settle his rivalry with Alata. Dereputa is killed in battle, but unknowingly releases the Yuumajuu.

In battle, Dereputa possesses arm blades and can perform the Meteor Bullet (流星弾, Ryūsei Dan), Super Meteor Bullet (超流星弾, Chō Ryūsei Dan), Meteor Dimensional Bullet (流星縦横弾, Ryūsei Jūō Dan), and Super-Galactic Meteor Bullet (超銀河流星弾, Chō Ginga Ryūsei Dan) attacks.

Dereputa is voiced by Rikiya Koyama (小山 力也, Koyama Rikiya).

===== Aliens =====
The Aliens (星人, Seijin) are monsters from different planets that serve Warstar whose full names relate to their talents. With the use of Brajira's Beebe Bugs, they are able to enlarge.

- Mizogu of the Clump (塊のミゾーグ, Katamari no Mizōgu): A Brasca Alien (ベラスカ星人, Berasuka Seijin) capable of absorbing rubble into his stomach grinder to create boulders to attack or capture opponents. He is summoned for Warstar's initial attack on Earth before the Goseigers kill him. Mizogu is voiced by Hidenari Ugaki (宇垣 秀成, Ugaki Hidenari).
- Zaruwaku of the UFO (ＵＦＯのザルワック, Yūfō no Zaruwakku): A Gubydal Alien (グバイデレ星人, Gubaidere Seijin) who can transform into a UFO and duplicate himself so he can abduct people in order to make money off of them. He is defeated by the Goseigers, enlarged by Brajira, and killed by Gosei Great. Zaruwaku is voiced by Mitsuru Ogata (小形 満, Ogata Mitsuru).
- Yuzeikusu of the Ice & Snow (氷雪のユウゼイクス, Hyōsetsu no Yūzeikusu): A Garyusu Alien (ガリュース星人, Garyūsu Seijin) who possesses cryokinesis. He is defeated by the Goseigers, enlarged by Brajira, and killed by Gosei Great. Yuzeikusu is voiced by Hiroki Yasumoto (安元 洋貴, Yasumoto Hiroki).
- Mazuarta of the Music (ミューズィックのマズアータ, Myūzikku no Mazuāta): A Teckric Alien (トッケリク星人, Tokkeriku Seijin) who considers himself the universe's best musician even though the sound he produces is painful to human ears and more so to the Skick Gosei Angels. With Brajira as his manager, Mazuarta almost kills everyone with his music until Eri's singing negates his sound. Mazuarta is destroyed by the Goseigers, enlarged by Brajira, and killed by Gosei Great. Mazuarta is voiced by Ryuzou Ishino (石野 竜三, Ishino Ryūzō).
- Ucyuseruzo of the Influenza (流感のウチュセルゾー, Ryūkan no Uchuseruzō): A Bugntes Alien (バグンテス星人, Baguntesu Seijin) capable of producing a virus that changes smart students into Beebe soldiers. After the Goseigers devise an antidote, they defeat Ucyuseruzo, who is enlarged by Brajira and killed by Seaick Gosei Great. Ucyuseruzo is voiced by Ryūsei Nakao (中尾 隆聖, Nakao Ryūsei).
- Hidou of the Swift Runner (韋駄天のヒドウ, Idaten no Hidō): A Ylabungora Alien (イラブンゴラ星人, Irabungora Seijin) who possesses superhuman speed. While Alata is able to counter him with his enhanced hearing, Dereputa separates the Gosei Angel from the others. In response, the remaining Goseigers train to master Alata's hearing ability so they can counter Hidou's speed. Hidou is defeated by the Goseigers, enlarged by Brajira, and killed by Landick Gosei Great. Hidou is voiced by Wataru Takagi (高木 渉, Takagi Wataru).
- Abauta of the Research (研究のアバウタ, Kenkyū no Abauta): A Zuteramedorop Alien (ズテラメドロプ星人, Zuteramedoropu Seijin) capable of observing and researching an opponent in order to counter them. Abauta is killed by Landick Gosei Great. Abauta is voiced by Akio Nojima (野島 昭生, Nojima Akio).
- Fandaho of the Nonsense (出鱈目のファンダホー, Detarame no Fandahō): A Totsneho Alien (トツネホ星人, Totsuneho Seijin) capable of scrambling targets with his back-mounted antennae. Going to Earth on his own, Fandaho attempts to make an impression on Mons Drake by causing chaos. Despite being enlarged by Brajira to prevent the Goseigers from negating his powers, Fandaho is killed by Exotic Gosei Great. Fandaho is voiced by Yasuhiro Takato (高戸 靖広, Takato Yasuhiro).
- Irian of the Queen Bee (女王蜂のイリアン, Joōbachi no Irian): A Bswa Alien (ブスワ星人, Busuwa Seijin) capable of producing a fluid that paralyzes male targets, allowing her to use them as material for her furniture. Irian is defeated by Gosei Pink and Yellow, enlarged by Brajira, and killed by Skick Gosei Great. Irian is voiced by Yukana (ゆかな).
- Kurasunigo of the 5000°C (５０００°Cのクラスニーゴ, Gosendo no Kurasunīgo): A Luview Alien (ルビーウ星人, Rubīu Seijin) capable of exuding heat from his armor, which he can use to perform the Spin Crisis (スピンクライシス, Supin Kuraishisu) and Corona Crisis (コロナクライシス, Korona Kuraishisu) attacks. While Dereputa was sent to destroy the Heaven's Tower, Kurasunigo was sent to boil the Earth's oceans before he was seemingly killed by Magis. Despite this, Kurasunigo reemerges months later to resume his mission. Kurasunigo is defeated by the Goseigers, enlarged by Brajira, and killed by Seaick Gosei Great. Kurasunigo is voiced by Tomoaki Maeno (前野 智昭, Maeno Tomoaki).
- Yokubabanger of the Electric Shock (電撃のヨークババンガー, Dengeki no Yōkubabangā): A Daicaci Alien (ダイケシ星人, Daikeshi Seijin) who can absorb and manipulate electricity and is considered one of Mons Drake's top soldiers. He is sent to Earth to commit acts of destruction via his powers, but the Goseigers defeat him. After being enlarged by Brajira, Yokubabanger siphons Gosei Great's power before he is killed by Datas Hyper. Yokubabanger is voiced by Kōzō Shioya (塩屋 浩三, Shioya Kōzō).
- Powereddark of the Mutation (変わり種のパワードダーク, Kawaridane no Pawādodāku): A Hognlo Alien (ホグンロ星人, Hogunro Seijin) who uses modified Power Seeds (パワーシード, Pawā Shīdo) created by Brajira to counter the Goseigers' attacks and wields his own version of the Skick Sword. After being defeated by the Mystic Brothers, an enlarged Powereddark is killed by Mystic Gosei Great. Powereddark is voiced by Yasunori Matsumoto (松本 保典, Matsumoto Yasunori).
- Targate of the Satellite (衛星のターゲイト, Eisei no Tāgeito): A Thailago Alien (スアイラゴ星人, Suairago Seijin) who specializes in teleportation and is also considered one of Mons Drake's top soldiers. Targate offers his aid in eliminating the Goseigers after being promised the apparently fallen Dereputa's position as his leader's right hand. After Targate withstands the Gosei Buster, the Goseigers use the Sky-Land-Sea Bullet to defeat him before Brajira enlarges him and the Goseigers use Mystic Gosei Great and Datas Hyper to kill Targate. Targate is voiced by Tetsu Inada (稲田 徹, Inada Tetsu).

====== Other Aliens ======
- Dorunpasu of the Revival (再生のドルンパス, Saisei no Dorunpasu): An Alien capable of resurrecting fallen monsters who is also considered one of Mons Drake's top soldiers. He uses his powers to resurrect several fallen Aliens, only to be killed by Gosei Great. Dorunpasu appears exclusively in the special drama sessions of the first original soundtrack.

==== Yuumajuu ====
The Earth Condemnation Group Yuumajuu (地球犠獄集団 幽魔獣, Chikyū Gigoku Shūdan Yūmajū; 17–32) (Note: "Yuumajuu" (幽魔獣, Yūmajū) can be translated as "Spectral Demon Beast". It also comes from the Japanese title for the film Rise of the Gargoyles (U.M.A（ユーマ） 2010, Yūma Nisenjū), which in turn uses a Japanese term for cryptid: "U.M.A. (Unidentified Mysterious Animal)".) are a group of cryptid/horror film creature/arthropod-themed monsters who seek to pollute the Earth and make it an ideal paradise for themselves. Similarly to the Warstar, each of the Yuumajuu's names are anagrams of monster movie titles.

Ten thousand years prior, the Yuumajuu battled the ancient Gosei Angels until an undercover Brajira sealed their two leaders in the Erurei Box (エルレイの匣, Erurei no Hako), the source of the Yuumajuu's power. In the present, Dereputa unknowingly exposes the Erurei Box, allowing Brajira to secretly break the seal and rejoin them in his Buredoran guise.

===== Makuin =====
Makuin of the Blob (ブロブの膜イン, Burobu no Makuin) is the earthworm-themed leader of the Yuumajuu who wishes to reform the world in his image so his kind can flourish and takes delight in human suffering. While enacting the Yuumajuu's final plan, Makuin is apparently destroyed by Ground Gosei Great. However, he intended for his apparent demise in order to absorb the full brunt of their Gosei Power before his remains are transferred into the Erurei Box to regenerate and create the Yuuma Hole (幽魔ホール, Yūma Hōru) to destroy the Earth. After the box is enlarged and placed on top of the Tokyo Metropolitan Government Building, Makuin attempts to absorb the Earth. However, the Goseigers travel inside the box and eventually reach his core so they can permanently kill him.

In battle, Makuin can use his Dorodorod (泥ドロッド, Dorodoroddo) cane to perform spells and manipulate his gelatinous body. He can also convert himself into the Yuuma Buster (幽魔バスター, Yūma Basutā) for Kinggon to use in their Yuuma Dynamic (幽魔ダイナミック, Yūma Dainamikku) attack.

Makuin is voiced by Chafurin (茶風林, Chafūrin).

====== Kinggon ======
Kinggon of the Bigfoot (ビッグフットの筋グゴン, Biggufutto no Kingugon) is the tarantula-themed military leader of the Yuumajuu and one of their strongest warriors who tends to say certain words in a sentence three times. Due to Kinggon and Makuin's combat efficiency while working together, Brajira secretly manipulates the former into proving his superiority over the latter by fighting the Goseigers alone in the hopes of eliminating Kinggon. However, Kinggon sees through the deception, goes into hiding to locate the Beebe Bugs' hive, and eventually resurfaces to kill Brajira before attempting to assist Makuin in their plan to absorb the Earth. After the Goseigers kill Makuin, Kinggon uses the Beebe Bugs to enlarge himself, only to killed by Gosei Ultimate.

In battle, Kinggon possesses incredible strength and wields the Kingbō (金グ棒, Kingubō) kanabō.

Kinggon is voiced by Kosuke Takaguchi (高口 公介, Takaguchi Kōsuke).

===== Minor Yuumajuu =====
The minor Yuumajuu (幽魔獣（ユーマじゅう）, Yūmajū) are monsters who avoided Makuin and Kinggon's fates by hiding within different parts of the Earth before resurfacing once their leaders are released. Their full name relates to the cryptids on which they are based. Like the aliens of Warstar, the Yuumajuu are also able to enlarge with the use of Brajira's Beebe Bugs.

- Tomarezu of the Tsuchinoko (ツチノコのト稀ヅ, Tsuchinoko no Tomarezu): A common pill-bug-themed Yuumajuu who can burrow underground and spew a green slime that can melt humans down into a toxic sludge which will seep into the Earth and taint it unless he is killed. After being defeated by Gosei Knight, Tomarezu is enlarged by Brajira, gaining the ability to assume a tank-themed alternate form. However, he is killed by Groundion. Tomarezu is voiced by Takashi Nagasako (長嶝 高士, Nagasako Takashi).
- Zeibu of the Mummy (ミイラのゼイ腐, Miira no Zeibu): A centipede-themed Yuumajuu who wields the Cursed Sand and the Cursed Whip and is capable of turning people into his mummified slaves. He plots to use a television broadcast to turn more humans into his slaves and mummify the entire planet until the Goseigers and Gosei Knight stop him. Following this, Zeibu is enlarged by Brajira and killed by Hyper Gosei Great. Zeibu is voiced by Norio Wakamoto (若本 規夫, Wakamoto Norio).
- Giemurou of the Kappa (河童のギエム郎, Kappa no Giemurō): A tick-themed Yuumajuu warrior with the ability to absorb moisture and a sumo wrestler-esque fighting style. After being found by Brajira, Giemurou is used in a scheme to use Gosei Knight's power to convert humans into kappas and have them convert others as well, all while draining the planet. However, Gosei Knight escapes his confines and defeats Giemurou. While Brajira enlarges the latter, Giemurou is killed by Gosei Ground. Giemurou is voiced by Ryūzaburō Ōtomo (大友 龍三郎, Ōtomo Ryūzaburō).
- Pesaranza of the Kesaran-Pasaran (ケサランパサランのペサラン挫, Kesaran-Pasaran no Pesaranza): A leech-themed Yuumajuu who feeds off of the persistent love between humans, possesses superhuman speed, and can break up his body into several fluff balls. After Makuin reconstructs him, Pesaranza drives humans to become obsessive and suitable for feeding. However, Pesaranza is defeated by the Goseigers and Gosei Knight, enlarged by Brajira, and killed by Gosei Ground and Skick Gosei Great. Pesaranza is voiced by Norihisa Mori (森 訓久, Mori Norihisa).
- Waraikozou of the Gremlin (グレムリンのワライコ僧, Guremurin no Waraikozō): A childish flea-themed Yuumajuu capable of destroying mechanical objects. He is defeated by the Goseigers, enlarged by Brajira, and killed by Gosei Ground and Gosei Great. Waraikozou is voiced by Chihiro Suzuki (鈴木 千尋, Suzuki Chihiro).
- Uobouzu of the Nessie (ネッシーのウオボ渦, Nesshī no Uobōzu): A snail-themed Yuumajuu who speaks in poems and eats shadows, leaving his victims in a state of paralysis that becomes fatal over time. Having battled Groundion in the past, Makuin finds Uobouzu in the present and asks for his help in settling the battle. Uobouzu is defeated by Gosei Knight, enlarged by Brajira, and killed by Ground Gosei Great. Uobouzu is voiced by Junpei Morita (森田 順平, Morita Junpei).
- Zaigo of the Skyfish (スカイフィッシュのザイ粉, Sukaifisshu no Zaigo): A stick insect-themed Yuumajuu able to raise humans' temperature via spark attacks, such as the Zaigo Stardust (ザイ粉スターダスト, Zaigo Sutādasuto) and the Spacy Shower (スペイシーシャワー, Supeishī Shawā). He is defeated by Gosei Red, Black, and Blue, enlarged by Brajira, and killed by Ground Gosei Great. Zaigo is voiced by Anri Katsu (勝 杏里, Katsu Anri).
- Semattarei of the Brocken Spectre (ブロッケン妖怪のセマッタ霊, Burokken Yōkai no Semattarei): A harvestman-themed Yuumajuu capable of casting illusions. Brajira uses him to manipulate the Goseigers into locating the Abare Headder, which he uses to enhance Semattarei's powers and make his illusions tangible. Despite this, Semattarei is killed by the Super Goseigers. Semattarei is voiced by Juji Matsuda (松田 重治, Matsuda Jūji).
- Sarawareteiru of the Fairy (妖精のサラワレテ居, Yōsei no Sarawareteiru): A leaf insect-themed Yuumajuu who uses golden pixie dust to assume disguises. Makuin tasks her with pretending to be Moune's mother. However, Moune eventually sees through the deception with Gosei Knight's help. Sarawareteiru is defeated by the Super Goseigers and Gosei Knight, enlarged by Brajira, and killed by Ground Gosei Great. Sarawareteiru is voiced by Yū Sugimoto (杉本 ゆう, Sugimoto Yū).
- Hit of the Tengu (天狗のヒッ斗, Tengu no Hitto): A scorpion-themed Yuumajuu who is equipped with a pair of feathered gauntlets, which allow him to perform the Tickling Wind attack, and carries a gourd capable of engulfing anyone who laughs in its presence. Despising human laughter, Hit enacts a scheme to rid the world of laughter. After the Skick and Landick Goseigers are captured, Gosei Blue and Knight trick the Yuumajuu into breaking his gourd and freeing his captives before defeating him. After being enlarged, Hit is weakened by Seaick Gosei Great and killed by Gosei Ground. Hit is voiced by Toshihiro Ogura (おぐら としひろ, Ogura Toshihiro).
- Jogon of the Ningyo (人魚のジョ言, Ningyo no Jogon): A silverfish-themed Yuumajuu and an old friend of Kinggon's who wields seashells that, when latched onto a victim, target one of their flaws and make them believe everyone around them is talking about it behind their back. Kinggon brings in Jogon to replace Brajira for failing the Yuumajuu, but Brajira attempts to use Jogon to kill Kinggon. Jogon is defeated by the Super Goseigers, enlarged by Brajira, and killed by Landick Gosei Great. Jogon is voiced by Taiki Matsuno (松野 太紀, Matsuno Taiki).
- Pikarime of the Shakōkidogū (遮光器土偶のピカリ眼, Shakōkidogū no Pikarime): An ant-themed Yuumajuu and an old friend of Makuin's with hypnotic powers. Makuin summons her to abduct children and make them jump off a cliff with the promise of becoming his new second-in-command. After Shuichirou Amachi breaks her spell, Pikarime is defeated by the Super Goseigers, enlarged by Brajira, and killed by Ground Gosei Great. Pikarime is voiced by Kanae Oki (沖 佳苗, Oki Kanae).
- Elmgaim of the Baku (獏のエルムガイ夢, Baku no Erumugaimu): A velvet worm-themed Yuumajuu capable of eating sleeping victims' dreams. After Makuin and Kinggon use the Erurei Box to enhance his powers, Elmgaim gains the ability to eat souls and leave his victims trapped in a nightmare world while their comatose bodies sprout roots capable of rotting the planet. Elmgaim is defeated by Super Gosei Pink and Gosei Knight, enlarged by Brajira, and killed by Ground Gosei Great. Elmgaim is voiced by Atsushi Imaruoka (伊丸岡 篤, Imaruoka Atsushi).

====== Other Yuumajuu ======
- Beetuice of the Poltergeist (ポルターガイストのビートゥース, Porutāgaisuto no Bītūsu): A Yuumajuu who possesses aerokinesis and invisibility. He is defeated by Gosei Knight, enlarged by Brajira, and killed by Ground Gosei Great. Beetuice appears exclusively in the special drama sessions of the series' third original soundtrack.

==== Matrintis ====
The Machine Onslaught Empire Matrintis (機械禦鏖帝国マトリンティス, Kikai Gyo'ō Teikoku Matorintisu; 33–44) is the remnants of an ancient empire that had sunk 4500 years ago, from which its cybernetically modified sole survivor and his marine invertebrate-themed robotic creations established a new base, the Machine Fortress Terminel (機械要塞ターミネル, Kikai Yōsai Tāmineru), and plotted against humanity before resurfacing in the present to enslave them. Similarly to Warstar and the Yuumajuu, Matrintis' forces are named after films that feature robots or cyborgs and their names feature non-Japanese characters.

===== Robogorg =====
Robogorg of the 10-sai (10（テン）サイのロボゴーグ, Tensai no Robogōgu) (Note: Robogorg's title "10-sai" (10（テン）サイ, Tensai) can be translated as "genius" (天才, tensai) or "disaster" (天災, tensai).) is the shrimp-themed leader of the Matrintis Empire who was originally a human scientist who perfected a method of immortality through cybernetics and uploading his mind into a Matroid body. Though he was ostracized for his methods prior to converting himself, the Matrintians begged him for his help when their city sank into the sea. Since then, Robogorg believes all organic life have no purpose other than to serve him and his machines due to their emotions. While he uses other Matroids to fight for him, he is not above getting personally involved if it benefits his desire to gather data on his opponents. Using his creations to gather intel on the Goseigers and Gosei Knight, Robogorg eventually moves in to finish them off by using Brajira to seal their Tensouders and Leon Cellular. However, Brajira secretly ensured the latter device remained functional, allowing Gosei Knight to foil Robogorg's plot to kill the Goseigers. Robogorg enlarges and attempts to use his self-destruct function to destroy the Goseigers, only to be scrapped by Gosei Ultimate. While his head survives and orders Brajira to repair him, the latter obliterates him instead.

Robogorg's title comes from his 10 built-in abilities: the Genius Brain (鬼才ブレイン, Kisai Burein), which allows him to create and improve Matroid designs, the Punishment Bomb (制裁ボム, Seisai Bomu) to discipline his subordinates, the Fortress Armor (要塞アーマー, Yōsai Āmā), the Devastation Vulcan (撃砕バルカン, Gekisai Barukan), the Blasting Missile (爆砕ミサイル, Bakusai Misairu), the Lumbering Saber (伐採セイバー, Bassai Seibā), the Dictatorship Hurricane (独裁ハリケーン, Dokusai Harikēn), and the Salvation Cell (救済セル, Kyūsai Seru), which allows another party to rebuild him. His most powerful attacks are the Calamity Destruction (厄災デストラクション, Yakusai Desutorakushon) cannon, an all-out attack that causes earthquakes and can only be used once, and the Suicide Crusher (玉砕クラッシャー, Gyokusai Kurasshā) self-destruct function, which has enough power to destroy a continent.

Robogorg is voiced by Jūrōta Kosugi (小杉 十郎太, Kosugi Jūrōta).

===== Metal Alice =====
Metal Alice of the Agent (エージェントのメタルA（アリス）, Ējento no Metaru Arisu) is Robogorg's basket star-themed personal attendant, a Matrintis marshal, and the first high-spec Matroid that Robogorg created. Amidst Matrintis' battles with the Goseigers, she develops a rivalry with Gosei Knight, but loses Robogorg's favor following Wonder Gosei Great defeating her. As a result of the latter event, he installs a Punishment Bomb into her to stop her from failing him again. After reviving Brajira as Buredo-RUN, who later saves her, Metal Alice takes interest in the concept of friendship and realizes the Goseigers cannot be underestimated. Upon learning Robogorg only kept her around to perfect Buredo-RUN, Metal Alice restores the latter's full memories and conspires with him to eliminate Robogorg. During Robogorg's final battle with the Goseigers, he orders Buredo-RUN to become a suicide bomber, but Metal Alice takes Buredo-RUN's place, taking a kill shot from Super Gosei Red in order to detonate her Punishment Bomb. While she narrowly survives, Buredo-RUN destroys her.

In battle, Metal Alice possesses the G Cup Buster (Gカップバスター, Jī Kappu Basutā) breast missiles and wields the Alice Pad (A（アリス）パッド, Arisu Paddo), which can convert into the Alice Pad Sword (A（アリス）パッドソード, Arisu Paddo Sōdo), allow her to summon Beebe Soldiers and Beebe Bugs, and convert the latter into Beebe Nails (ビービネイル, Bībi Neiru) to enlarge the Matroids.

Metal Alice is voiced by Marina Inoue (井上 麻里奈, Inoue Marina).

===== Matroids =====
The Matroids (マトロイド, Matoroido) are the Matrintis Empire's robotic soldiers programmed to follow three protocols: conquer humans, punish humans, and protect themselves from any hostility. Their full name refers to their model type and main functionality. With the use of Metal Alice's Beebe Nails, the Matroids are able to enlarge.

- Zan-KT of the Shield (シールドのザンKT, Shīrudo no Zan Kē Tī): A scallop-themed Matroid able to create a shield from surrounding materials. He is sent to capture humans, only to be defeated by the Super Goseigers, enlarged by Metal Alice, and scrapped by Gosei Ultimate. Zan-KT is voiced by Taketora (武虎).
  - Zan-KT2 of the Shoot (シュートのザンKT2, Shūto no Zan Kē Tī Tsū): An upgraded version of Zan-KT with blasters in place of his shield ability. Zan-KT2 is defeated by the Super Goseigers and Gosei Knight, enlarged by Metal Alice, and scrapped by Gosei Ultimate and Gosei Ground. Zan-KT2 is voiced by Taketora.
  - Zan-KT3 of the Short (ショートのザンKT3, Shōto no Zan Kē Tī Surī): Three mass-produced Matroids that combine attributes of the previous models, though the Goseigers and Gosei Knight easily destroy them. The Zan-KT3s are voiced by Ibuki (勇吹輝).
  - Zan-KT0 of the Shot (ショットのザンKT0, Shotto no Zan Kē Tī Zero): A prototypical version of Zan-KT of the Shield. Zan-KT0 is deployed to destroy the Negakure Temple and obtain the power source Metal Alice detected within it. However, he is defeated by the time-travelling Gokaigers, enlarged by Metal Alice, and scrapped by GouZyuJin. Zan-KT0 appears exclusively in episode 40 of Kaizoku Sentai Gokaiger.
- Zuteru-S of the Mach (マッハのズテルS, Mahha no Zuteru Esu): A copepod-themed Matroid able to fly at blinding speeds and perform the Mach Extreme (マッハエクストリーム, Mahha Ekusutorīmu) attack. He is sent to gather humans for labor, only to be defeated by the Super Goseigers, enlarged by Metal Alice, and scrapped by Ultimate Gosei Great. Zuteru-S is voiced by Isshin Chiba (千葉 一伸, Chiba Isshin).
- Bazaruso-LJ of the Scan (スキャンのバザルソLJ, Sukyan no Bazaruso Eru Jē): A cuttlefish-themed Matroid sent to find and capture physically fit humans in order to convert into cyborg soldiers, only to be defeated by Super Gosei Black and Gosei Knight, enlarged by Metal Alice, and scrapped by Ultimate Gosei Great. Bazaruso-LJ is voiced by Toshitsugu Takashina (高階 俊嗣, Takashina Toshitsugu).
- Adoborute-G of the Vital (バイタルのアドボルテG, Baitaru no Adoborute Jī): A coral-themed Matroid with optical camouflage technology that allows him to disguise himself as a human in a pink rabbit suit. He is sent to test his petrifying Vital Meter on humans in a scheme to ensure Matrintis' human slaves are less likely to rebel. He is defeated by Super Gosei Yellow, enlarged by Metal Alice, and scrapped by Gosei Ultimate. Adoborute-G is voiced by Mitsuaki Hoshino (星野 充昭, Hoshino Mitsuaki).
- Bakutofuji-ER of the Timer (タイマーのバクトフージER, Taimā no Bakutofūji Ī Āru): A horseshoe crab-themed Matroid capable of rewinding time by 10 seconds via his Time Reverse (タイムリバース, Taimu Ribāsu) ability. Metal Alice sends him to lure the Goseigers into a trap so Buredo-RUN can destroy them. After she enlarges him to cover Buredo-RUN, Bakutofuji-ER battles Gosei Ultimate and Gosei Ground. Unbeknownst to Metal Alice however, Buredo-RUN fires a beam into the Matroid and giant robots' colliding attacks, which causes a time warp that sends Alata and Bakutofuji-ER back in time and shrinks the Matroid. They eventually return to the present, where Bakutofuji-ER is re-enlarged by Metal Alice and scrapped by Ground Gosei Great. Bakutofuji-ER is voiced by Kōichi Sakaguchi (坂口 候一, Sakaguchi Kōichi).
- Ain-I of the Neutral (ニュートラルのアインI, Nyūtoraru no Ain Ai): A starfish-themed Matroid that Metal Alice designs to help her understand the concept of friendship and equipped with a remote-controlled Alice Bomb (A（アリス）ボム, Arisu Bomu), which has a 300-meter blast radius. She leaves him in Eri's care, with the Gosei Angel nicknaming him "Koro". While Ain-I learns much about humanity and friendship, Metal Alice deems the experiment a waste of time, wipes his memory, and activates his battle mode to destroy the Goseigers. Metal Alice enlarges Ain-I and activates the Alice Bomb. Eri uses Gosei Ultimate to transport Ain-I into the stratosphere, but he reactivates and knocks her away before exploding. Ain-I is voiced by Kappei Yamaguchi (山口 勝平, Yamaguchi Kappei).
- Saroge-DT of the Imitation (イミテイションのサロゲDT, Imiteishon no Saroge Dī Tī): A sponge-themed, Datas Hyper-esque Matroid who ends his sentences with "death" (デス, desu) and was personally built by Robogorg after kidnapping and researching Datas' schematics and data on the Goseigers. While Saroge-DT overpowers the Goseigers, Gosei Blue uses his Camoumirage Card to throw the Matroid off-guard before the Super Goseigers and Gosei Knight defeat him. Metal Alice enlarges the Matroid, but he is scrapped by Datas Hyper and Gosei Ultimate. Saroge-DT is voiced by Takahiro Miyauchi (宮内 尊寛, Miyauchi Takahiro).

====== Other Matroids ======
- Estworl-D of the Download (ダウンロードのエストワールD, Daunrōdo no Esutowāru Dī): An octopus-themed Matroid who creates the Dark Goseigers (ダークゴセイジャー, Dāku Goseijā) team through analysis of the Goseigers' data and abilities. Estworl-D appears exclusively in the series' tie-in stage show.

==== Earth Salvation Plan ====
The Earth Salvation Plan (地球救星計画, Chikyū Kyūsei Keikaku; 45–50) is the name of an operation and movement launched by Brajira to destroy the Earth based in the Matrintis Empire's underwater base Terminel, renamed Labyrindel (ラビリンデル, Rabirinderu), and serves as the final villain faction faced by the Goseigers.

===== Brajira =====
Brajira of the Messiah (救星主のブラジラ, Kyūseishu no Burajira) is a fallen Gosei Angel (元護星天使, moto Gosei Tenshi) and the series' primary antagonist with a messiah complex who assumes several "Buredoran" (ブレドラン, Buredoran) guises to battle the Goseigers.

Brajira was originally the most powerful of the ancient Gosei Angels, able to use all three elements at once after killing his teammates to take their powers for his own. While working undercover within the Yuumajuu as Buredoran of the Chupacabra, he sealed their leaders Makuin and Kinggon within the Erurei Box and became obsessed with his mission as a Gosei Angel to the point of fashioning the Earth Salvation Plan to destroy the world and remake it in his own image. To this end, Brajira used the incomplete Timetrouble (タイムトラブル, Taimutoraburu) Tensou Technique to travel from his time to the present, which mutated him. As the Warstar had just arrived on Earth as well, Brajira joined them as Buredoran of the Comet and provided them with his inventions - the Beebe Soldiers and the Beebe Bugs - along with his knowledge of the Gosei Angels to manipulate Warstar into disabling his former allies with the intention of disposing of the aliens personally once the job was done.

When the Goseigers defeat Warstar however, Brajira unseals the Yuumajuu's leaders and returns to their ranks to continue his fight against the Goseigers, though he briefly returns to Warstar when their remnants come to Earth to destroy it. After losing the Abare Headder to the Goseigers, Brajira falls out of favor with the lead Yuumajuu and attempts to eliminate them and the Goseigers simultaneously, only to be killed by them.

During the events of the crossover film Tensou Sentai Goseiger vs. Shinkenger: Epic on Ginmaku, Brajira revives himself as Buredoran of Chimatsuri, assumes leadership of the Gedoushu, and brainwashes Shinken Red in a scheme to transfer the Sanzu River's waters into the Gosei World. However, the Goseigers and Shinkengers join forces to kill him once more.

Amidst their own battles with the Goseigers, the Matrintis Empire find Brajira's near-lifeless body, rebuild him as Buredo-RUN of the Cyborg, and remove most of his memories. Robogorg intends to use Brajira's powers to seal the Goseigers' Tensouders, but Metal Alice takes pity on Brajira and restores his memories. With this, Brajira destroys Robogorg and Metal Alice before temporarily going into hiding to restore his original mutated form. Upon resurfacing and revealing his true identity to the Goseigers, Brajira captures and reprograms Gosei Knight to serve him while using Warstar's military might, the Yuumajuu's magic, and the Matrintis Empire's technology to enact the Nega End Ceremony. He battles the Goseigers a final time before using the last of his Dark Gosei Power to activate the ceremony, intending to take Earth with him. However, the Goseigers use the Gosei Global (ゴセイグローバル, Gosei Gurōbaru) Tensou Technique to foil his plans.

In battle, Brajira wields the Dark Sword (ダークソード, Dāku Sōdo) and possesses a perverted form of Gosei Power called Dark Gosei Power (ダークゴセイパワー, Dāku Gosei Pawā), which is sealed away in Orbs (オーブ, Ōbu) instead of cards, that allow him to perform ancient, crude versions of the Goseigers' Tensou Techniques. Additionally, he mastered the forbidden End (エンド, Endo) Tensou Technique, which allows the user to resurrect Earth's creatures, and used it as the basis for the Nega End (ネガー・エンド, Negā Endo) Tensou Technique, which has the opposite effect and causes a mass extinction.

Throughout the series, Brajira wears different armor to fit into several villainous organizations as their strategists and substitute leaders. He can also produce duplicates of his past forms and/or use the Camoumirage Tensou Technique to shapeshift between them.

- Buredoran of the Comet (彗星のブレドラン, Suisei no Buredoran): Brajira's treehopper-themed Warstar form, which he first assumed after he traveled to the present and joined the aforementioned organization in their attack against Earth, fighting the Goseigers personally whenever their Tensou Techniques or weaknesses are exploited. In this form, he wields the Buredolancer (ブレドランサー, Buredoransā) and can perform the Comet Bullet (彗星弾, Suisei Dan) attack.
- Buredoran of the Chupacabra (チュパカブラの武レドラン, Chupakabura no Buredoran): Brajira's house centipede-themed Yuumajuu form, which he assumed while operating as their strategist. In this form, he wields the Buredolicer (武レドライサー, Bredoraisā) claws.
- Buredo-RUN of the Cyborg (サイボーグのブレドRUN, Saibōgu no Buredoran): Brajira's ammonite-themed Matrintis form. In this form, he wields the BuredoLaunchers (ブレドランチャー, Buredoranchā) and the Buremerangs (ブレメラン, Buremeran).
- Buredoran of Chimatsuri (血祭のブレドラン, Chimatsuri no Buredoran): Brajira's antlion-themed Gedoushu form that resembles their fallen leader, Doukoku Chimatsuri, which he used to assume leadership of the aforementioned organization during the events of Tensou Sentai Goseiger vs. Shinkenger: Epic on Ginmaku. In this form, he wields a broadsword similar to Doukoku's Shōryū Bakuzantō and can perform the Gedou Chimatsuri Bullet (外道血祭弾, Gedō Chimatsuri Dan) attack.

Brajira is voiced by Nobuo Tobita (飛田 展男, Tobita Nobuo).

===== Beebe =====
The poisonous, cycloptic, bat-like Beebe Bugs (ビービ虫, Bībi Mushi) are living products of the dark aspects of previous alien races that Warstar conquered. They are usually deployed to enlarge targets, both living creatures and inanimate objects such as the Erurei Box alike. By merging with dolls, the Beebe Bugs transform into the humanoid Demon Bug Soldiers Beebe (魔虫兵ビービ, Machūhei Bībi) who wield various weapons to support the evil organizations that Brajira aligns himself with. Over the course of the series, Brajira keeps the Beebe Bugs' hive in order to utilize them for Warstar and the Yuumajuu until Kinggon takes it. Following the Yuumajuu's death, Metal Alice claims the hive and modifies the Beebe Bugs into Beebe Nails for the Matrintis Empire's purposes.

While most of the Beebe Bugs are destroyed following Brajira's death, during the events of the special Tensou Sentai Goseiger Returns, one surviving specimen called the King Beebe Bug (キングビービ虫, Kingu Bībi Mushi) possesses Yumeko Hoshino in an attempt to seek revenge on the Goseigers and feed on the darkness in humans' hearts. He gains the ability to evolve into a humanoid form called King Beebe (キングビービ, Kingu Bībi), but the Goseigers foil his plans before destroying him with Ground Gosei Great.

King Beebe is voiced by Kenji Nomura (乃村 健次, Nomura Kenji).

===== Dark Headders =====
Similarly to the Gosei Angels, Brajira utilizes Dark Headders (ダークヘッダー, Dāku Heddā), multi-headed monsters meant to become wedges as part of their master's Nega End (ネガー・エンド, Negā Endo) ceremony. Like normal Headders, the Dark Headders can also serve as armaments. They are each based on two mythological beasts and one weapon, and named after a fantasy film series, with the heads' individual names divided in Japanese by the interpunct.

- Namono-Gatari of the Ortaurus Headder (オルトウロスヘッダーのナモノ・ガタリ, Orutōrosu Heddā no Namono Gatari): The two-headed, Orthrus/Minotaur/ono-themed Namono (ナモノ) and Gatari (ガタリ) are the first of the Dark Headders to fight the Goseigers. They possess incredible teamwork and regenerative properties unless their horns are cut off simultaneously. After they are destroyed by the Landick siblings and enlarged by the Beebe Bugs, Namono-Gatari allow themselves to be destroyed by Landick Gosei Great so they can transform into the Land Wedge (土の楔, Tsuchi no Kusabi) for the Nega End ceremony. Namono-Gatari are voiced by Takahiro Imamura (今村 卓博, Imamura Takahiro) and Kyōsei Tsukui (津久井 教生, Tsukui Kyōsei) respectively.
- Bari-Boru-Dara of the Uniberus Headder (ユニベロスヘッダーのバリ・ボル・ダラ, Yuniberosu Heddā no Bari Boru Dara): The three-headed, unicorn/Cerberus/yari-themed Bari (バリ), Boru (ボル), and Dara (ダラ) who possess the ability to transform into a right-handed gauntlet. After being weakened by the Skick and Landick Super Goseigers and enlarged by the Beebe Bugs, Bari-Boru-Dara allow themselves to be destroyed by Seaick Gosei Great so they can transform into the Sea Wedge (海の楔, Umi no Kusabi) for the Nega End ceremony. Bari-Boru-Dara are voiced by Hisao Egawa (江川 央生, Egawa Hisao).
- Lo-O-Za-Ri of the Hydrapan Headder (ヒドラパーンヘッダーのロー・オ・ザー・リ, Hidorapān Heddā no Rō O Zā Ri): The four-headed, hydra/Pan/drill-themed Lo (ロー, Rō), O (オ), Za (ザー, Zā), and Ri (リ) who possess the ability to transform into a left-handed drill, arm blades that they can shoot off, and green eye beams. After being enlarged by the Beebe Bugs, Ro-O-Za-Ri allow themselves to be destroyed by Datas Hyper and Gosei Ultimate so they can transform into the Sky Wedge (空の楔, Sora no Kusabi) for the Nega End ceremony. Ro-O-Za-Ri are voiced by Hiroshi Yanaka (家中 宏, Yanaka Hiroshi).

== Guest characters ==
- Magis (マジス, Majisu): A member of the Seaick Tribe and Hyde's former partner who could transform into Gosei Green (ゴセイグリーン, Gosei Gurīn). Prior to the beginning of the series, he was killed by Kurasunigo of the 5000 °C after sacrificing himself to save Hyde. Magis is portrayed by Yousuke Itou (伊藤 陽佑, Itō Yōsuke).

== Spin-off characters ==
- Rasil (ラシル, Rashiru): An alien girl and the sole survivor of an unnamed planet that was destroyed by an alien weapon called the Horn of Ragnarok (ラグナロクの角笛, Ragunaroku no Tsunobue), which is capable of ending planets through a series of cataclysmic disasters and inspired myths surrounding Gjallarhorn and Ragnarök after landing on Earth millennia prior, who appears exclusively in the film Tensou Sentai Goseiger: Epic on the Movie. Upon learning the horn landed on Earth and that the Warstar army wants to use it, Rasil attempts to retrieve it first before it can be used to destroy other planets. After the Goseigers learn of her mission, they help her defeat Warstar, during which she gives them the power to summon Gosei Wonder. Once Warstar is defeated, Rasil leaves with another survivor to rebuild her homeworld. Rasil is portrayed by Sayaka Isoyama (磯山 さやか, Isoyama Sayaka).
- Gyōten'ō of the Supernova (超新星のギョーテンオー, Chōshinsei no Gyōten'ō): A Doditake Alien (ドッディテケ星人, Dodditeke Seijin) who refers to himself as Warstar's strongest officer, seeks the Horn of Ragnarok, and appears exclusively in the film . After arriving on Earth and locating the horn, Gyōten'ō swallows it to ensure the end of the world, gaining the ability to resurrect deceased Warstar members in the process. Despite damaging the Dragon Headder, he is killed by Wonder Gosei Great, which shatters the horn in the process. Gyōten'ō is voiced by Hidekatsu Shibata (柴田 秀勝, Shibata Hidekatsu).
- Deinbaruto of the Morning Star (明星のデインバルト, Myōjō no Deinbaruto): A Desapoda Alien (デサプオダ星人, Desapuoda Seijin), Gyōten'ō's right-hand man, and one of the last remaining members of Warstar following Mons Drake's death who wields the twin Shmoke Blade (シュモク刀, Shumoku Tō) katars and appears exclusively in the film Tensou Sentai Goseiger: Epic on the Movie. He assists his commanding officer in retrieving the Horn of Ragnarok until he is killed by Gosei Pink and Yellow. Deinbaruto is voiced by Bin Shimada (島田 敏, Shimada Bin).
- Sakai (サカイ): A talent agent from and namesake of Sakai Entertainment who becomes the Goseigers' manager after they become celebrities and appears exclusively in the V-Cinema Tensou Sentai Goseiger Returns. Sakai is portrayed by Kenji Anan (阿南 健治, Anan Kenji).
- Yumeko Hoshino (星野 ユメコ, Hoshino Yumeko): A struggling actress who appears exclusively in the V-Cinema Tensou Sentai Goseiger Returns. Due to her depression over her failing career, she becomes possessed by King Beebe and willingly aids him in his scheme to undermine the Goseigers by turning them into celebrities before framing them for robbing the Prime Minister. Throughout the scheme, she poses as an aide to the Goseigers' manager, Sakai, until they realize what happened and reach out to her, separating her from King Beebe. After defeating him, they tell her to keep following her dream. Yumeko Hoshino is portrayed by Mayuko Iwasa (岩佐 真悠子, Iwasa Mayuko)
