= Yudai Chiba =

Japanese actor and model

- 千葉雄大
- Born: March 9, 1989 (age 37); Miyagi, Tagajō, Japan
- Occupation: Actor
- Years active: 2009 –present
- Agent: Japanese Music Entertainment
- Website: chibayudai.com (in Japanese)

Yudai Chiba (千葉 雄大, Chiba Yūdai; March 9, 1989) is a Japanese actor and model. He is under the Japanese talent Agency Japan Music Entertainment. He is known for playing as Alata (Gosei Red) in Tensou Sentai Goseiger and its movies. He reprised this role in a voice-only appearance in Kamen Rider × Super Sentai: Super Hero Taisen.

== Filmography ==
=== TV series ===
- Tensou Sentai Goseiger (2010–2011), Alata/Gosei Red
- Ouran High School Host Club (2011), Mitsukuni Haninozuka
- Runaway: For Your Love (2011), Toshio Inui
- Fallen Angel (2012), Kuma-chan
- Shirato Osamu no Jikenbo (2012), Shirato Osamu
- Princess of the Frog (2012), Shinobu Takagaki
- Kuro no Onna Kyoshi (2012), Ryohei Mochizuki
- Taira no Kiyomori (2012), Emperor Takakura
- Resident - 5-nin no Kenshui (2012), Minato Miyama
- Take Five (2013), Yano Shoutarou
- Summer Nude (2013), Yoneda Haruo
- Eve in Love (2013)
- Shitsuren Chocolatier (2014), Daisuke Nakamura
- Water Polo Yankees (2014), Tomoki Kimura
- The File Of Young Kindaichi Neo (2014), Kentaro Kato (Ep 3–4)
- I'm Taking the Day Off (2014)
- Kazoku no Katachi (2016), Haruto Irie
- Your Home Is My Business! (2016), Satoshi Adachi
- Warotenka (2017), Shin'ichi Fujioka
- Ani ni Ai Saresugite Komattemasu (2017), Takane Serikawa
- Final Fantasy XIV: Dad of Light (2017), Akio Inaba
- The Kitazawas: We Mind Our Own Business (2018)- Matsuya Kusunoki
- Pocket Monsters: Sun & Moon (2018), Ilima (voice)
- Ieyasu, Edo wo Tateru (2019)
- The Sunflower on the Shogi Board (2019), Keisuke Kamijō
- Ossan's Love: In the Sky (2019), Ryu Naruse
- Likes! Mr. Genji (2020), Hikaru Genji
- Double (2022), Takara
- The Laughing Salesman (2025)
- Strobe Edge (2025–26)

=== Films ===
- Samurai Sentai Shinkenger vs. Go-onger: GinmakuBang!! (2010), Alata/Gosei Red (voice only)
- Tensou Sentai Goseiger: Epic on the Movie (2010), Alata/Gosei Red
- Tensou Sentai Goseiger vs. Shinkenger: Epic on Ginmaku (2011), Alata/Gosei Red
- Gokaiger Goseiger Super Sentai 199 Hero Great Battle (2011), Alata/Gosei Red
- Tensou Sentai Goseiger Returns (2011), Alata/Gosei Red
- Kamen Rider × Super Sentai: Super Hero Taisen (2012), Gosei Red (voice only)
- Gekijoban Oran Koko Hosutobu (2012), Mitsukuni Haninozuka
- Ao Haru Ride (2014), Kikuchi Toma
- Bakumatsu Kokosei (2014), Shintaro Numata
- Mr. Maxman (2015), Masayoshi Taniguchi
- Tsuugaku Series Tsuugaku Densha (2015), Harukawa Tanaka
- Tsuugaku Series Tsuugaku Tochu (2015), Harukawa Tanaka
- Kurosaki-kun no Iinari ni Nante Naranai (2016), Takumi Shirakawa
- The Magnificent Nine (2016), Chūnai Chisaka
- Unrequited Love (2016), Kaname
- My Brother Loves Me Too Much (2017), Takane Serikawa
- The Dark Maidens (2017)
- Teiichi: Battle of Supreme High (2017), Okuto Morizono
- ReLIFE (2017), Ryō Yoake
- Ajin: Demi-Human (2017), Masumi Okuyama
- Yo-kai Watch Shadowside: Oni-ō no Fukkatsu (2017), Touma Tsukinami (voice)
- Louder!: Can't Hear What You're Singin', Wimp (2018), Sakaguchi
- Run! T High School Basketball Club (2018)
- Stolen Identity (2018), Manabu Kagaya
- The 47 Ronin in Debt (2019), Isoda Takedayū
- No Longer Human (2019), Kaoru Ōta
- Stolen Identity 2 (2020), Manabu Kagaya
- One Summer Story (2021), Akihiro Moji
- To the Supreme! (2022), Tomu Hoshikawa
- Stolen Identity: Final Hacking Game (2024), Manabu Kagaya
- Mr. Osomatsu: Project Slackers (2026)

=== Japanese dub ===
- Hop (2011), Fred O'Hare
- Peter Rabbit (2018), Peter Rabbit
- Peter Rabbit 2: The Runaway (2021), Peter Rabbit

== Awards and nominations ==
Year	Award	Category	Work	Result	Ref.
2015	Best Styling Award	20's Male Category	Himself	Won	
2017	40th Japan Academy Film Prize	Newcomer of the Year	The Magnificent Nine	Won	
2017	The Best Beauty 2017	Male Actor Category	Himself	Won	
