= Ono (axe) =

Type of large axe

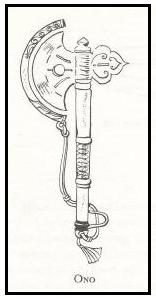
Illustration of an ono

Ono (斧) (historically wono, をの) or masakari is the Japanese word for "axe", and is used to describe various tools of similar structure. As with axes in other cultures, ono are sometimes employed as weapons. Many existing examples of this particular weapon are associated with the sōhei (warrior monks) or yamabushi, who also adapt other agricultural tools as weapons, although samurai are also pictured as using ono in woodblock prints. Ono that were specifically designed for military use are of extreme rarity. The weapon version of the ono is described as having "a very large head with a very convex cutting edge and a large scroll-shaped peen opposite it. It has a sheath covering only the edge of the blade. The entire length is nearly 6 ft (180 cm)".

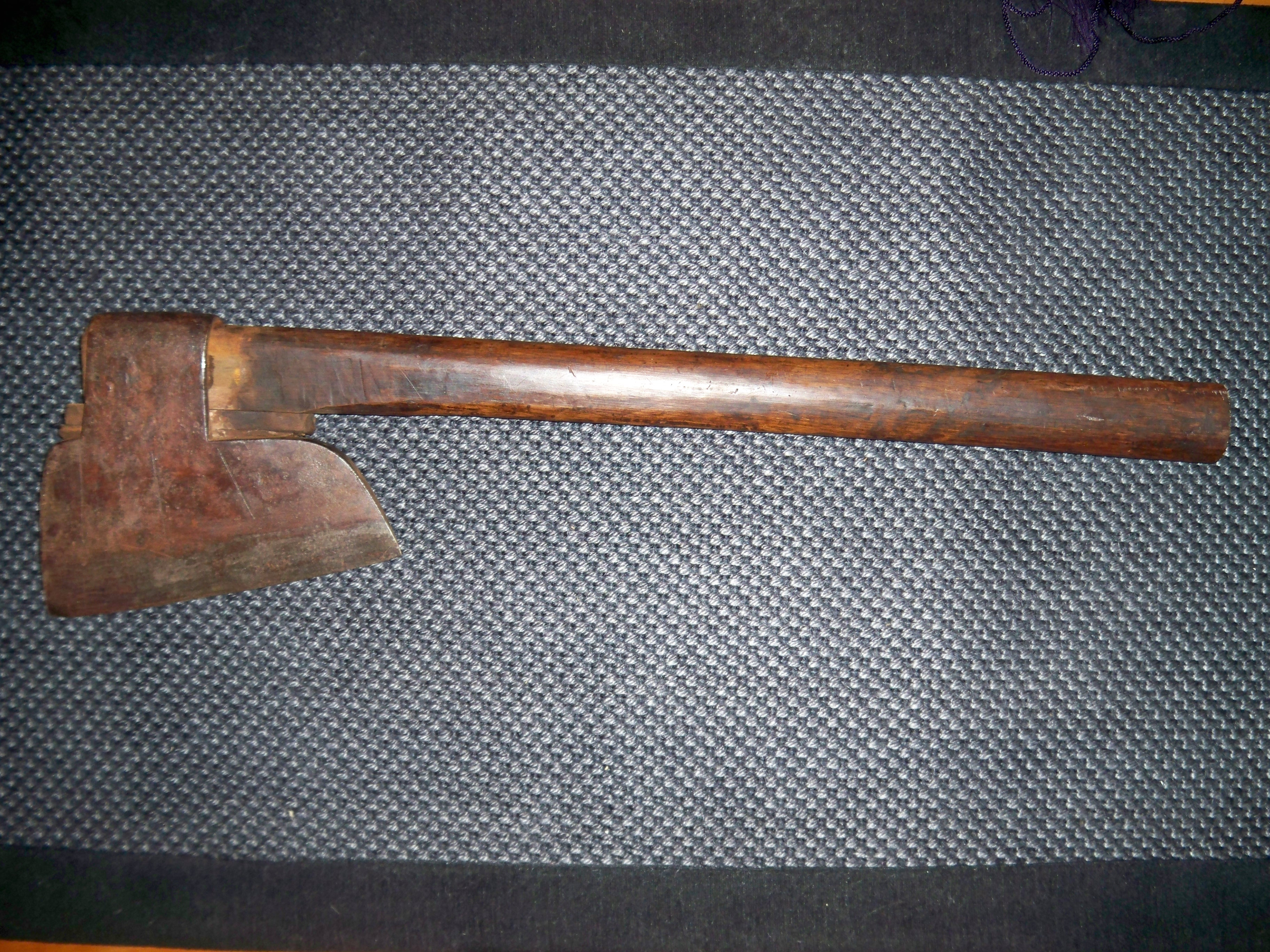
Antique Japanese ono

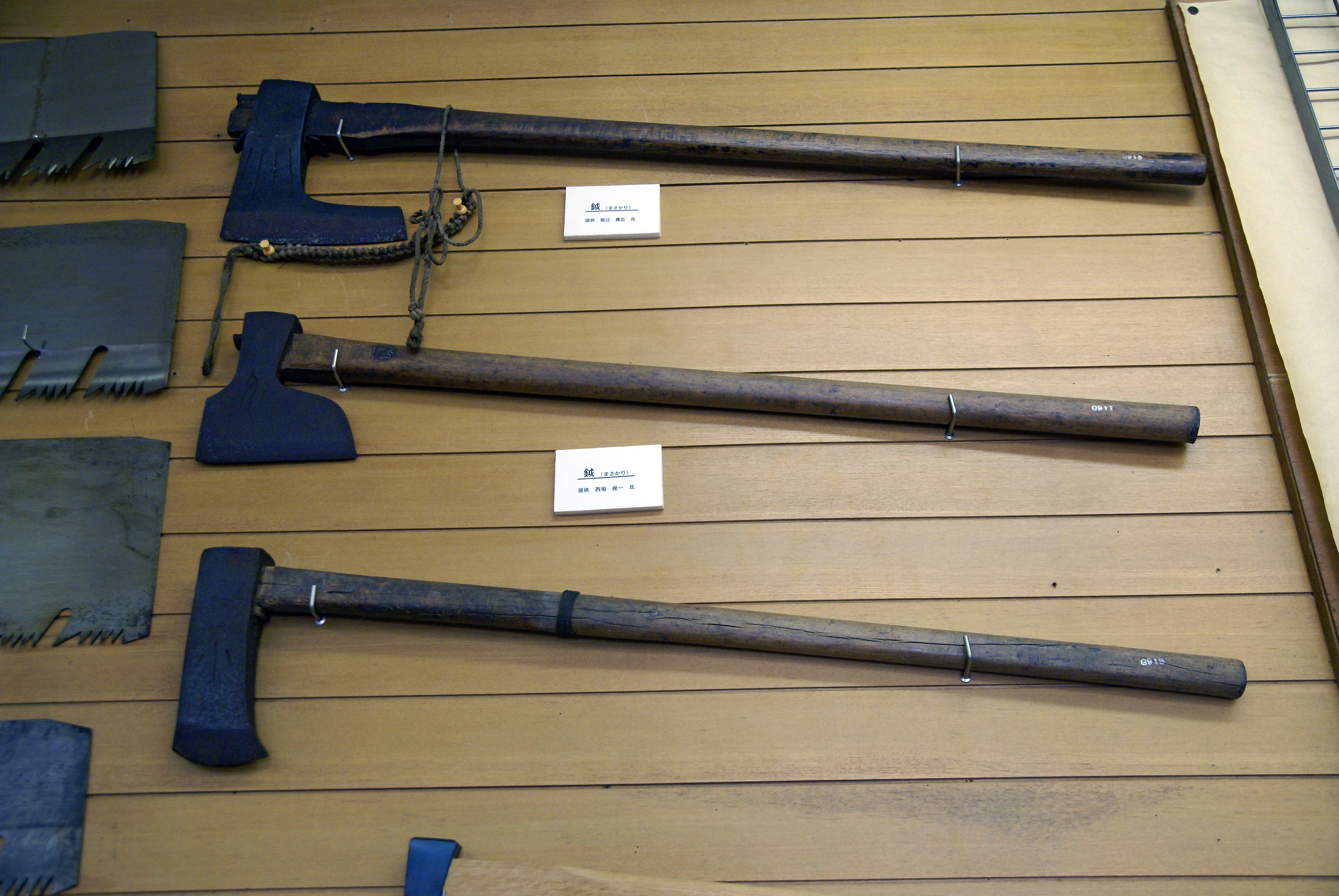
Some onos in the Miki City Hardware Museum
