= Kento Ono =

Japanese actor and model

- 小野 健斗
- Born: August 9, 1989 (age 36); Tokyo, Japan
- Occupations: Actor, model
- Years active: 2004–2014; 2015–present
- Agent: JJ Promotion
- Height: 185 cm (6 ft 1 in)
- Relatives: Maaya Ono (older sister)

Kento Ono (小野 健斗, Ono Kento; born August 9, 1989, in Tokyo) is a Japanese actor and model who is affiliated with Stardust Promotion, then later JJ Promotion. He played the role of Hyde (Gosei Blue) in the 2010 Super Sentai TV series Tensou Sentai Goseiger.

== Biography ==
Ono was born on August 9, 1989, in Tokyo, Japan. He has an older sister, Maaya, who also was an actress before his retirement from the entertainment industry in 2017. In 2004, Ono participated in the 17th Junon Super Boy Contest. He was a model for the magazine, Love Berry, and his acting debut was on the 2006 stage play, Tenimyu. Ono appeared on the same stage until 2008. In 2010, he appeared in Tensou Sentai Goseiger as Hyde/Gosei Blue. In his official blog on January 21, 2014, Ono announced that he left from Stardust Promotion and had a pause his activities. On February 13, 2015, he returned his entertainment activities with a new affiliation, JJ Promotion and appeared in the television drama, Messiah's Eisei no Fumi.

== Filmography ==
=== TV series ===
Year	Title	Role	Network	Other notes
2005	Ultraman Max	High school student	CBC	Episode 25
2006	Ultraman Mebius	Tatsumi Kazama	CBC	Episode 23
2006	Komyo ga Tsuji	Tokugawa Yorifusa	NHK	
2009	Uramiya Honpo Reboot	Shū	TV Asahi	
2009	Q.E.D.	Kota	NHK	Episode 3
2010–2011	Tensou Sentai Goseiger	Hyde/Gosei Blue	TV Asahi	Main cast: 50 episodes
2010	Super Sentai Versus Series Theater	Hyde/Gosei Blue	TV Asahi	Main cast: 29 episodes
2010	Manpuku Shōjo Dragonet	Yukito Azuma	tvk	Episode 11
2015	Messiah: Eisei no Shō	Mitsumi Haku	Tokyo MX	Main cast: 13 episodes
2016	Yoru Café	Kotaro	Tokyo MX2	

=== Films ===
Year	Title	Role	Other notes
2009	Hanamuko wa 18-sai	Kotaro Noborito	
2009	Beatrock Love	Roku	
2010	Samurai Sentai Shinkenger vs. Go-onger: GinmakuBang!!	Gosei Blue (Voice)	
2010	28 1/2 Mousou no Kyojin		
2010	Tensou Sentai Goseiger: Epic on the Movie	Hyde/Gosei Blue	
2011	Tensou Sentai Goseiger vs. Shinkenger: Epic on Ginmaku	Hyde/Gosei Blue	
2011	Gokaiger Goseiger Super Sentai 199 Hero Great Battle	Hyde/Gosei Blue	
2013	Messiah: Shikkoku No Shō	Mitsumi Haku	
2017	Messiah Gaiden: Kyokuya Polar Night	Mitsumi Haku	
2022	Residents of Evil		
2022	Residents of Evil 2		
