= Mikiho Niwa =

Japanese television presenter

- にわ みきほ
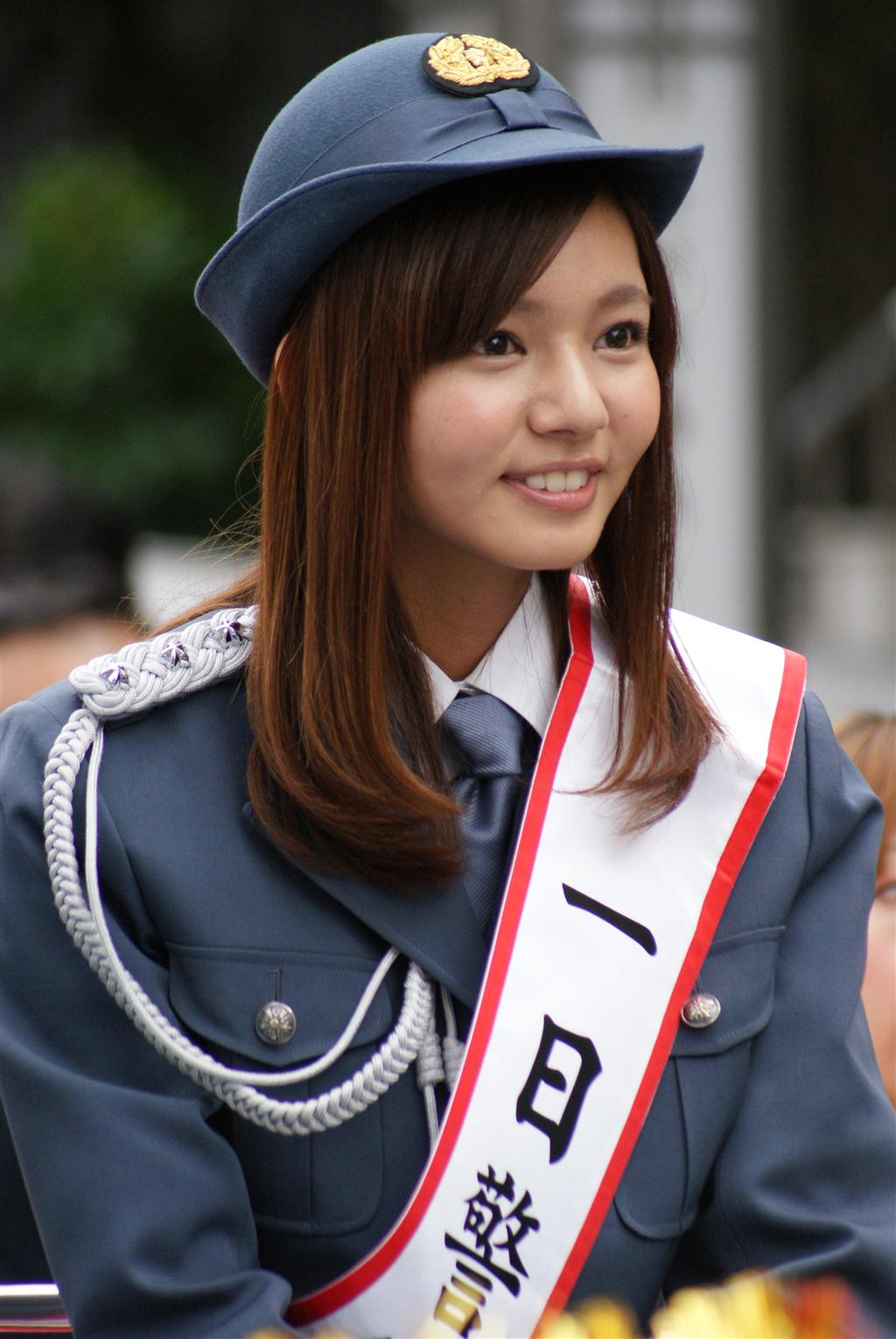
- Mikiho Niwa as the first chief at the Shingawa Police Station on September 25, 2011
- Born: September 27, 1989 (age 36); Aichi Prefecture, Japan
- Occupations: Actress; model; singer
- Height: 165 cm (5 ft 5 in)
- Spouse: Takeshi Tanaka (m. 2016)
- Children: 2

Mikiho Niwa (にわ みきほ, Niwa Mikiho; born September 27, 1989 in Aichi Prefecture) is a Japanese television presenter, and formerly an actress, model, and member of the Japanese idol group Canary Club. She played the role of Moune/GoseiYellow in the thirty-fourth Super Sentai series Tensou Sentai Goseiger, and appeared in the 2011 film Cheerfu11y. From 2011 to 2013 Niwa was a regular model for the magazine SEDA. In 2013 she became a weather presenter on the Nippon TV morning programme Zip!.

In November 2016 Niwa announced her marriage to a fellow NTV presenter, Takeshi Tanaka. She has 2 children.
