= Tensou Sentai Goseiger =

Japanese drama

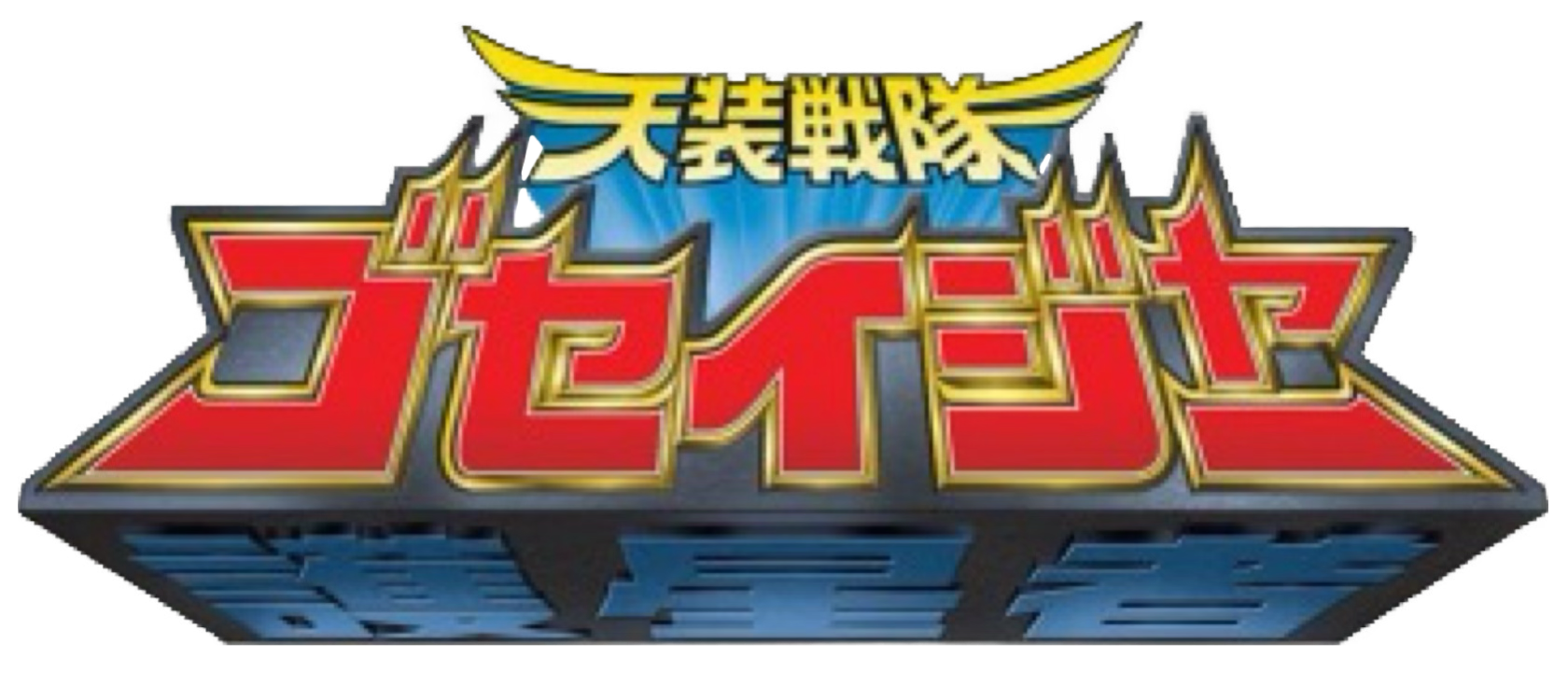
- The title card for Tensou Sentai Goseiger
- Genre: Tokusatsu; Superhero fiction Fantasy fiction Supernatural
- Created by: Toei Company
- Written by: Michiko Yokote; Naruhisa Arakawa; Kento Shimoyama; Junko Komura; Akatsuki Yamatoya; Daisuke Ishibashi; Saburo Yatsude
- Directed by: Takao Nagaishi; Shojiro Nakazawa; Noboru Takemoto; Hiroyuki Kato; Katsuya Watanabe; Nobuhiro Suzumura; Satoshi Morota
- Starring: Yudai Chiba; Rika Sato; Kyousuke Hamao; Mikiho Niwa; Kento Ono; Sakuya Nakamura; Louis Yamada LIII
- Voices of: Ikuya Sawaki; Kōki Miyata; Katsuyuki Konishi; Nobuo Tobita; Shōzō Iizuka; Rikiya Koyama; Chafurin; Kosuke Takaguchi; Jūrōta Kosugi; Marina Inoue
- Narrated by: Ikuya Sawaki
- Opening theme: "Tensou Sentai Goseiger" by NoB (Project.R)
- Ending theme: "Gotcha☆Goseiger" by Hideyuki Takahashi (Project.R); "Gotcha☆Goseiger TYPE 2 REMIX" by Hideyuki Takahashi; "Gotcha☆Goseiger (TYPE 2 Gosei Angel Version)" by Goseigers & Hideyuki Takahashi
- Composer: Kazunori Miyake
- Country of origin: Japan
- No. of episodes: 50 (list of episodes)

Production
- Producers: Motoi Sasaki (TV Asahi); Jun Hikasa; Go Wakamatsu; Takahito Ōmori (Toei); Kōichi Yada; Akihiro Fukada (Toei Agency)
- Production location: Tokyo, Japan (Greater Tokyo Area)
- Running time: 24–25 minutes
- Production companies: TV Asahi; Toei Company; Toei Agency

Original release
- Network: TV Asahi
- Release: February 14, 2010 – February 6, 2011

Related
- Samurai Sentai Shinkenger; Kaizoku Sentai Gokaiger

Tensou Sentai Goseiger (天装戦隊ゴセイジャー, Tensō Sentai Goseijā; Heavenly Armament Squadron Goseiger) (Note: "Tensou" (天装, Tensō) is literally translated as "Celestial Armament" while "Goseiger" (ゴセイジャー, Goseijā) is a portmanteau of the Japanese words for "Guard" (護, Go), "Star" (星, Sei) and "Ranger" (レンジャー, Renjā). Additionally, the kanji Goseija (護星者, Planet Guardians) is also featured in the series logo and the series' title can also be Romanized as Heavenly Squad Goseiger.) is the title of Toei Company's 34th entry in its long-running Super Sentai franchise. It follows an angelic motif as well as a trading card theme. It joined Kamen Rider W, and later Kamen Rider OOO, as a program featured in TV Asahi's Super Hero Time programming block. It aired from February 14, 2010 to February 6, 2011, replacing Samurai Sentai Shinkenger and was replaced by Kaizoku Sentai Gokaiger. The series ties in with the arcade game Super Sentai Battle: Dice-O, with the characters using cards resembling Carddass cards used in the game to transform and access various weapons, similar to the concept of Kamen Rider Decade and its link to Kamen Rider Battle: Ganbaride. Goseiger's footage was later used for the 2013 Power Rangers series Power Rangers Megaforce and its second season Super Megaforce.

The cast and characters were revealed at an event at Tokyo Dome City on January 30 and 31, 2010. The protagonists also had a cameo appearance in the film, Samurai Sentai Shinkenger vs. Go-onger: GinmakuBang!!.

== Story ==
Unknown to the people of Earth, there is a branch of humanity called the "Gosei Angels" whose mission is to protect the Earth. When the Earth is targeted by an evil alien invasion force called Warstar, they destroy the Heaven's Tower, the bridge between the Earth and the Gosei World, home of the Gosei Angels, to keep them from interfering. However, five apprentice Gosei Angels are on Earth at the time and, while finding a way to return home, they become the Goseigers to stop Warstar. After many hard battles the Warstar are defeated, but soon after, the monstrous Yuumajuu emerge from their slumber and the Goseigers receive aid from a special being called Gosei Knight who once fought against the Yuumajuu in the past. They defeat the Yuumajuu as well, but the evil robotic Matrintis Empire rises to take over the Earth with the data acquired from the last two factions. Once they are defeated, the Goseigers face their greatest enemy in the one who has been manipulating the other groups from the very beginning: a rogue Gosei Angel who took their mission to protect the Earth to a dangerous extreme by planning to destroy all life and recreate the world in his image.

== Episodes ==
Each episode of Tensou Sentai Goseiger is referred to as an "epic" (エピック, epikku).

No.	Title	Written by	Original release date
1	"The Gosei Angels Descend"; Transliteration: "Gosei Tenshi, Kōrin" (Japanese: 護星天使、降臨)	Michiko Yokote	February 14, 2010
2	"The Fantastic Goseigers"; Transliteration: "Fantasutikku Goseijā" (Japanese: ファンタスティック・ゴセイジャー)	Michiko Yokote	February 21, 2010
3	"Landick Power Divided"; Transliteration: "Randikku Pawā, Bunretsu" (Japanese: ランディックパワー、分裂)	Michiko Yokote	February 28, 2010
4	"Play the Angel's Song"; Transliteration: "Hibike, Tenshi no Uta" (Japanese: 響け、天使の歌)	Michiko Yokote	March 7, 2010
5	"Magical Hyde"; Transliteration: "Majikaru Haido" (Japanese: マジカル・ハイド)	Naruhisa Arakawa	March 14, 2010
6	"The Breakout Goseigers"; Transliteration: "Bureikuauto Goseijā" (Japanese: ブレイクアウト・ゴセイジャー)	Naruhisa Arakawa	March 21, 2010
7	"Protect the Land!"; Transliteration: "Daichi o Mamore!" (Japanese: 大地を護れ！)	Akatsuki Yamatoya	March 28, 2010
8	"Out of Control Gosei Power"; Transliteration: "Gosei Pawā, Bōsō" (Japanese: ゴセイパワー、暴走)	Akatsuki Yamatoya	April 4, 2010
9	"Gotcha☆Gosei Girls"; Transliteration: "Gatcha Gosei Gāruzu" (Japanese: ガッチャ☆ゴセイガールズ)	Michiko Yokote	April 11, 2010
10	"Hyde's Partner"; Transliteration: "Haido no Aibō" (Japanese: ハイドの相棒)	Michiko Yokote	April 18, 2010
11	"Spark, Landick Power"; Transliteration: "Supāku Randikku Pawā" (Japanese: スパーク・ランディックパワー)	Naruhisa Arakawa	April 25, 2010
12	"The Miraculous Gosei Headder Great Assembly"; Transliteration: "Mirakuru Gosei Heddā Daishūgō" (Japanese: ミラクル・ゴセイヘッダー大集合)	Naruhisa Arakawa	May 2, 2010
13	"Run! The Mystic Runner"; Transliteration: "Hashire! Misutikku Rannā" (Japanese: 走れ！ミスティックランナー)	Akatsuki Yamatoya	May 9, 2010
14	"Birth of the Ultimate Tag Team!"; Transliteration: "Saikyō Taggu Tanjō!" (Japanese: 最強タッグ誕生！)	Akatsuki Yamatoya	May 16, 2010
15	"Countdown! The Life of the Earth"; Transliteration: "Kauntodaun! Hoshi no Inochi" (Japanese: カウントダウン！地球の命)	Michiko Yokote	May 23, 2010
16	"Dynamic Alata"; Transliteration: "Dainamikku Arata" (Japanese: ダイナミックアラタ)	Michiko Yokote	May 30, 2010
17	"A New Enemy! The Yuumajuu"; Transliteration: "Aratana Teki! Yūmajū" (Japanese: 新たな敵！幽魔獣)	Naruhisa Arakawa	June 6, 2010
18	"The Earth Purifying Knight of Destiny"; Transliteration: "Hoshi o Kiyomeru Shukumei no Kishi" (Japanese: 地球を浄める宿命の騎士)	Naruhisa Arakawa	June 13, 2010
19	"Gosei Knight Will Not Allow It"; Transliteration: "Gosei Naito wa Yurusanai" (Japanese: ゴセイナイトは許さない)	Saburo Yatsude	June 20, 2010
20	"Fall In Love Goseigers"; Transliteration: "Fōrin Rabu Goseijā" (Japanese: フォーリンラブ・ゴセイジャー)	Kento Shimoyama	June 27, 2010
21	"Elegant Eri"; Transliteration: "Ereganto Eri" (Japanese: エレガント・エリ)	Michiko Yokote	July 4, 2010
22	"Over the Rainbow"; Transliteration: "Ōbā Za Reinbō" (Japanese: オーバー・ザ・レインボー)	Michiko Yokote	July 18, 2010
23	"Burn! Goseigers"; Transliteration: "Moero! Goseijā" (Japanese: 燃えろ！ゴセイジャー)	Naruhisa Arakawa	July 25, 2010
24	"The Miracle Attack Goseigers"; Transliteration: "Mirakuru Atakku Goseijā" (Japanese: ミラクルアタック・ゴセイジャー)	Naruhisa Arakawa	August 1, 2010
25	"Nostalgic Moune"; Transliteration: "Nosutarujikku Mone" (Japanese: ノスタルジック・モネ)	Kento Shimoyama	August 8, 2010
26	"The Laughing Gosei Angels"; Transliteration: "Gosei Tenshi, Bakushō!" (Japanese: 護星天使、爆笑！)	Kento Shimoyama	August 15, 2010
27	"Wake Up Agri!"; Transliteration: "Mezamero, Aguri!" (Japanese: 目覚めろ、アグリ！)	Michiko Yokote	August 22, 2010
28	"A Father's Treasure"; Transliteration: "Otōsan no Takaramono" (Japanese: おとうさんの宝物)	Michiko Yokote	August 29, 2010
29	"The Goseigers are Sealed!"; Transliteration: "Goseijā o Fūin seyo!" (Japanese: ゴセイジャーを封印せよ！)	Michiko Yokote	September 5, 2010
30	"Romantic Eri"; Transliteration: "Romantikku Eri" (Japanese: ロマンティック・エリ)	Junko Kōmura	September 12, 2010
31	"Never Give Up, Goseigers!"; Transliteration: "Nebā Gibu Appu! Goseijā" (Japanese: ネバーギブアップ！ゴセイジャー)	Naruhisa Arakawa	September 19, 2010
32	"Perform the Ultimate Miracle!"; Transliteration: "Kyūkyoku no Kiseki o Okose!" (Japanese: 究極の奇跡を起こせ！)	Naruhisa Arakawa	September 26, 2010
33	"The Dreadful Matrintis Empire"; Transliteration: "Kyōfu no Matorintisu Teikoku" (Japanese: 恐怖のマトリンティス帝国)	Saburo Yatsude	October 3, 2010
34	"Gosei Knight Justice"; Transliteration: "Gosei Naito Jasutisu" (Japanese: ゴセイナイト・ジャスティス)	Michiko Yokote	October 10, 2010
35	"Find the Perfect Leader!"; Transliteration: "Pāfekuto Rīdā o Sagase!" (Japanese: パーフェクトリーダーを探せ！)	Junko Kōmura	October 17, 2010
36	"Run, Agri!"; Transliteration: "Hashire, Aguri!" (Japanese: 走れ、アグリ！)	Daisuke Ishibashi	October 24, 2010
37	"Excited Moune"; Transliteration: "Ekisaito Mone" (Japanese: エキサイト・モネ)	Michiko Yokote	October 31, 2010
38	"Alice vs. Gosei Knight"; Transliteration: "Arisu Bāsasu Gosei Naito" (Japanese: アリスVSゴセイナイト)	Michiko Yokote	November 7, 2010
39	"Epic Zero"; Transliteration: "Epikku Zero" (Japanese: エピック･ゼロ)	Michiko Yokote	November 14, 2010
40	"Strong Alata"; Transliteration: "Sutorongu Arata" (Japanese: ストロング・アラタ)	Michiko Yokote	November 21, 2010
41	"Exploding Bonds of Friendship!"; Transliteration: "Bakuhatsu! Nakama no Kizuna" (Japanese: 爆発！仲間の絆)	Kento Shimoyama	November 28, 2010
42	"Passionate Hyde"; Transliteration: "Jōnetsu Teki Haido" (Japanese: 情熱的ハイド)	Junko Kōmura	December 5, 2010
43	"The Empire's All-Out Attack"; Transliteration: "Teikoku Sōkōgeki" (Japanese: 帝国総攻撃)	Kento Shimoyama	December 12, 2010
44	"The Ultimate Final Battle"; Transliteration: "Kyūkyoku no Saishū Kessen" (Japanese: 究極の最終決戦)	Kento Shimoyama	December 19, 2010
45	"The Messiah is Born"; Transliteration: "Kyūseishu, Tanjō" (Japanese: 救星主、誕生)	Michiko Yokote	December 26, 2010
46	"Gosei Knight is Targeted"; Transliteration: "Nerawareta Gosei Naito" (Japanese: 狙われたゴセイナイト)	Michiko Yokote	January 9, 2011
47	"The Trap of the Earth Salvation Plan"; Transliteration: "Chikyū Kyūsei Keikaku no Wana" (Japanese: 地球救星計画の罠)	Michiko Yokote	January 16, 2011
48	"The Fighting Gosei Power"; Transliteration: "Tatakau Gosei Pawā" (Japanese: 闘うゴセイパワー)	Michiko Yokote	January 23, 2011
49	"Fight Towards the Future"; Transliteration: "Mirai e no Tatakai" (Japanese: 未来への戦い)	Michiko Yokote	January 30, 2011
50	"Protecting the Planet is an Angel's Mission"; Transliteration: "Hoshi o Mamoru wa Tenshi no Shimei" (Japanese: 地球を護るは天使の使命)	Michiko Yokote	February 6, 2011

== Production ==
The trademark for the series was filed by Toei Company on August 12, 2009.

== Films and Specials ==
The Goseigers made their first appearance as a cameo in the crossover film Samurai Sentai Shinkenger vs. Go-onger: GinmakuBang!!.

=== Theatrical ===
==== Epic on the Movie ====
Tensou Sentai Goseiger: Epic on the Movie (天装戦隊ゴセイジャー エピックON THEムービー, Tensō Sentai Goseijā Epikku On Za Mūbī) was released on August 7, 2010, double-billed with Kamen Rider W Forever: A to Z/The Gaia Memories of Fate. The story of the film concerns the return of Warstar and two meteorites heading for Earth, among many other natural disasters taking place. The events of the movie take place between Epics 23 and 24.

==== Goseiger vs. Shinkenger ====
The film Tensou Sentai Goseiger vs. Shinkenger: Epic on Ginmaku (天装戦隊ゴセイジャーVSシンケンジャー エピック on 銀幕, Tensō Sentai Goseijā tai Shinkenjā Epikku on Ginmaku) was released in theaters on January 22, 2011, featuring a crossover between the Goseiger and Shinkenger casts and characters. The heroes of Kaizoku Sentai Gokaiger also make a cameo appearance in the film. The events of the movie take place between Epics 32 and 33.

==== Gokaiger Goseiger Super Sentai 199 Hero Great Battle ====
Gokaiger Goseiger Super Sentai 199 Hero Great Battle (ゴーカイジャー ゴセイジャー スーパー戦隊199ヒーロー 大決戦, Gōkaijā Goseijā Sūpā Sentai Hyakukyūjūkyū Hīrō Daikessen) is the film commemorating the 35th anniversary of the Super Sentai Series. The film primarily featured the casts of Goseiger and Kaizoku Sentai Gokaiger, among the 199 total heroes from the Super Sentai series to appear. The film was originally scheduled for release on May 21, 2011. However, due to the 2011 Tōhoku earthquake and tsunami, filming was affected and the film's release was postponed to June 11.

=== V-Cinema ===
==== Tensou Sentai Goseiger Returns ====
Tensou Sentai Goseiger Returns: Last Epic – The Gosei Angels are National Idols!? (帰ってきた天装戦隊ゴセイジャー last epic ～護星天使が国民的アイドルに？！～, Kaettekita Tensō Sentai Goseijā: Rasuto Epikku ~Gosei Tenshi ga Kokuminteki Aidoru ni?!~) is a V-Cinema release for Goseiger, serving as an epilogue for the series. The direct-to-video film also features Mayuko Iwasa (岩佐 真悠子, Iwasa Mayuko) in a guest starring role. Come Back! Tensou Sentai Goseiger became available for rental on June 10, 2011, and for sale on June 21, 2011. The events of the movie take place between Epic 50 and the events of Kaizoku Sentai Gokaiger.

== Cast ==
- Alata (アラタ, Arata): Yudai Chiba (千葉 雄大, Chiba Yūdai)
- Eri (エリ): Rika Sato (さとう 里香, Satō Rika)
- Agri (アグリ, Aguri): Kyousuke Hamao (浜尾 京介, Hamao Kyōsuke)
- Moune (モネ, Mone): Mikiho Niwa (にわ みきほ, Niwa Mikiho)
- Hyde (ハイド, Haido): Kento Ono (小野 健斗, Ono Kento)
- Nozomu Amachi (天知 望, Amachi Nozomu): Sakuya Nakamura (中村 咲哉, Nakamura Sakuya)
- Professor Shuichirou Amachi (天知 秀一郎博士, Amachi Shūichirō-hakase): Louis Yamada LIII (山田ルイ53世, Yamada Rui Gojūsan-sei)

=== Voice cast ===
- Narrator, Master Head (マスターヘッド, Masutā Heddo), Tensouder (テンソウダー, Tensōdā): Ikuya Sawaki (沢木 郁也, Sawaki Ikuya)
- Datas (データス, Dētasu): Kōki Miyata (宮田 幸季, Miyata Kōki)
- Gosei Knight (ゴセイナイト, Gosei Naito)/Groundion Headder (グランディオンヘッダー, Gurandion Heddā): Katsuyuki Konishi (小西 克幸, Konishi Katsuyuki)
- Brajira of the Messiah (救星主のブラジラ, Kyūseishu no Burajira)/Buredoran of the Comet (彗星のブレドラン, Suisei no Buredoran)/Bredoran of the Chupacabra (チュパカブラの武（ブ）レドラン, Chupakabura no Buredoran)/Bred-RUN of the Cyborg (サイボーグのブレドRUN, Saibōgu no Buredoran): Nobuo Tobita (飛田 展男, Tobita Nobuo)
- Great King Monsu Doreiku (大王モンス・ドレイク, Daiō Monsu Doreiku): Shōzō Iizuka (飯塚 昭三, Iizuka Shōzō)
- Dereputa of the Meteor (流星のデレプタ, Ryūsei no Dereputa): Rikiya Koyama (小山 力也, Koyama Rikiya)
- Makuin of the Blob (ブロブの膜（マク）イン, Burobu no Makuin): Chafurin (茶風林, Chafūrin)
- Kinggon of the Bigfoot (ビッグフットの筋（キン）グゴン, Biggufutto no Kingugon): Kosuke Takaguchi (高口 公介, Takaguchi Kōsuke)
- Robogorg of the 10-sai (10（テン）サイのロボゴーグ, Tensai no Robogōgu): Jūrōta Kosugi (小杉 十郎太, Kosugi Jūrōta)
- Metal-A of the Agent (エージェントのメタルA（アリス）, Ējento no Metaru Arisu): Marina Inoue (井上 麻里奈, Inoue Marina)

=== Guest cast ===
- Jotaro (丈太郎, Jōtarō; 7): Tetsu Watanabe (渡辺 哲, Watanabe Tetsu)
- Magis (マジス, Majisu; 10): Yousuke Itou (伊藤 陽佑, Itō Yōsuke)
- Himself (10): Sakana-kun (さかなクン)
- Satoshi Tamura (田村 聡, Tamura Satoshi; 19): Teruaki Ogawa (小川 輝晃, Ogawa Teruaki)
- Kyoko Tamura (田村 今日子, Tamura Kyōko; 19): Satomi Hirose (広瀬 仁美, Hirose Satomi)
- Mizuki Takazaki (高崎 みずき, Takazaki Mizuki; 20): Riria Kojima (小島 梨里杏, Kojima Riria)
- Moune's Mother (25): Maiko Itō (いとう まい子, Itō Maiko)
- Naoto Nakamura (中村直人, Nakamura Naoto; 36): Toru Baba (馬場徹, Baba Tōru)

== Songs ==
Opening theme

- "Tensou Sentai Goseiger" (天装戦隊ゴセイジャー, Tensō Sentai Goseijā)
  - Lyrics: Yumi Yoshimoto
  - Composition: YOFFY
  - Arrangement: Hiroaki Kagoshima
  - Artist: NoB (Project.R)

Ending theme

- "Gotcha☆Goseiger" (ガッチャ☆ゴセイジャー, Gatcha Goseijā)
  - Lyrics: Shoko Fujibayashi
  - Composition: Takafumi Iwasaki
  - Arrangement: Project.R (Kenichiro Ōishi)
  - Artist: Hideyuki Takahashi (Project.R)
  - Episodes: 1 – 7, 12, 15, 16, 22, 28, 31, 33, 39 – 41, 43 & 48 – 50
- "Gotcha☆Goseiger TYPE 2 REMIX" (ガッチャ☆ゴセイジャー TYPE 2 REMIX, Gatcha Goseijā Taipu Tsū Rimikkusu)
  - Lyrics: Shoko Fujibayashi
  - Composition: Takafumi Iwasaki
  - Arrangement: Project.R (Kenichiro Ōishi)
  - Artist: Hideyuki Takahashi
  - Episodes: 8 – 11, 13, 14, 17 – 21, 23 – 27, 29, 30, 32 & 34 – 38
- "Gotcha☆Goseiger (TYPE 2 Gosei Angel Version)" (ガッチャ☆ゴセイジャー（TYPE2護星天使ヴァージョン）, Gatcha Goseijā (Taipu Tsū Gosei Tenshi Vājon))
  - Lyrics: Shoko Fujibayashi
  - Composition: Takafumi Iwasaki
  - Arrangement: Project.R (Kenichiro Ōishi)
  - Artist: Goseigers & Hideyuki Takahashi
  - Episodes: 42 & 44 – 47

A single containing the opening theme, first ending theme, their karaoke variations, as well as two image songs, was released on March 17, 2010. A music video for the opening theme featuring NoB and Gosei Red was recorded and put on YouTube by Columbia Music Entertainment. In its first week of release, the single reached #6 on the Oricon Weekly Charts.
