= List of Samurai Sentai Shinkenger characters =

Samurai Sentai Shinkenger (侍戦隊シンケンジャー, Samurai Sentai Shinkenjā) is a Japanese tokusatsu series that serves as the 33rd installment in the Super Sentai franchise and the 21st entry in the Heisei era. The series incorporates heavy elements of Japan in terms of culture, mythology and Nihon Bukkyō.

== Main characters ==
=== Shinkengers ===
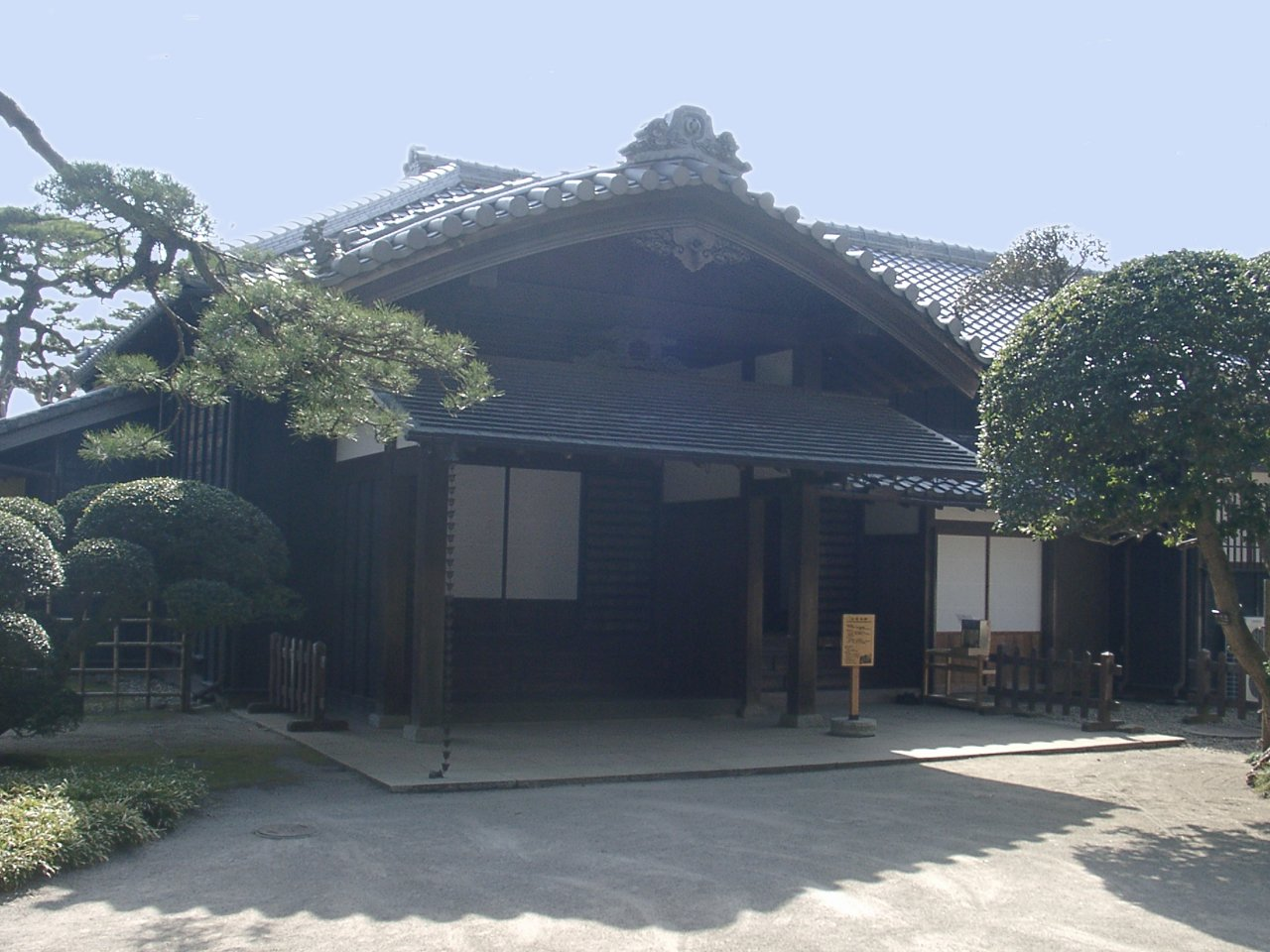
The historic household of the Hotta clan is the setting of the Shiba House.

The Shinkengers transformed. From left to right: Chiaki Tani, Kotoha Hanaori, Genta Umemori, Takeru Shiba, Mako Shiraishi, and Ryunosuke Ikenami.

The eponymous Shinkengers existed for 18 generations to protect the world from the Gedoushu, demonic beings from the Sanzu River. Based out of the Shiba House (志葉家, Shiba Ke) that originated from Mount Tsunobue (角笛の山, Tsunobue no Yama), the Shinkengers use a kanji-based power called Modikara (モヂカラ, Mojikara; Character Power), which is passed down from one generation to the next (currently on the 18th Generation). Once becoming a Shinkenger, they must renounce their past lives in order to keep their friends and family safe in case a member of the Gedoushu targets them. The Shiba House's manor is protected by a barrier of the "Protect" (守, Mamoru) Modikara, keeping the Shinkengers safe. They use a Gap Sensor (隙間センサー, Sukima Sensā) to detect the presence of a Gedoushu and its whereabouts.

The primary Shinkengers utilize the Shodo Phone (ショドウフォン, Shodō Fon) in Brush Mode (筆モード, Fude Mōdo) to gain access to Modikara powers, either for transformation purposes or to summon other items with the proper kanji. When not in use, it assumes Cellphone Mode (携帯モード, Keitai Mōdo) as a basic communication tool. Their sidearm is the Shinkenmaru (シンケンマル), a katana modeled after a praxinoscope that allows them to harness the power of Secret Disks and their personal elemental attacks. Using a personal Secret Disk allows a Shinkenger to perform a Spiral Sword (螺旋之太刀, Rasen no Tachi) attack depending on the element that the disk represents. Five Spiral Sword elemental attacks can be used in the Quintuple Sword (五重之太刀, Gojū no Tachi) and Five-Colored Dance (五色之舞, Goshiki no Mai; In OST vol.1) attacks while four can be used in the Four Continual Slash (四連斬り, Yonren Giri) and Quadruple Sword (四重之太刀, Yonjū no Tachi) attacks. With Shinken Gold, they can perform the Six Continual Slash (六連斬り, Rokuren Giri) attack.

After acquiring the Inromaru (インロウマル, Inrōmaru) from the Tengen Temple and having Genta complete the device, any one of the primary Shinkengers can utilize it to assume a white-coated Super Shinkenger (スーパーシンケンジャー, Sūpā Shinkenjā) form that allows them to keep up with the Gedoushu forces' increasing strength and use advanced elemental attacks. Upon transformation, the user combines the Inromaru and their Shinkenmaru to form the Super Shinkenmaru (スーパーシンケンマル, Sūpā Shinkenmaru), which allows them to perform upgraded versions of their Spiral Sword techniques. They also wield the Mougyu Bazooka (モウギュウバズーカ, Mōgyū Bazūka), which can combine with their Super Shinkenmaru to form the Super Mougyu Bazooka (スーパーモウギュウバズーカ, Sūpā Mōgyū Bazūka) and perform the Heretic Ruination (外道覆滅, Gedō Fukumetsu) finisher. In other media not within the series' canon, Shinken Gold is able to become Super Shinken Gold without the Inromaru.

==== Takeru Shiba ====
Takeru Shiba (志葉 丈瑠, Shiba Takeru) is the main protagonist of the series, a young man referred to by his vassals and servants as Lord (殿, Tono). He was raised since childhood by Hikoma Kusakabe to act the role of the 18th head of the Shiba House after his father gave him the Shishi Origami. His upbringing made him create a facade to look very arrogant and proud to others, claiming none can match his strength and greatness, while keeping his cool in any situation. Though he was reluctant to have the vassals fight by his side, as he wanted no one else to bear the burden, he allowed their involvement after giving them the choice to turn back or become Shinkengers out of want rather than need, as long as they are willing to finish their mission to the last detail. By the time Genta arrives, Takeru's facade is revealed as he now questions himself of how it makes him strong along with learning he shares similar attributes with Juzo before defeating him. While at times it may not appear so, Takeru does care greatly for his vassals and when Genta arrives, he becomes more open with them. However, in a fight against Juzo, it is revealed that Takeru started to value his life more which, in Juzo's opinion, makes him weaker and makes Takeru doubt himself. In reality, Takeru has been acting as a kagemusha for the true 18th head of the Shiba House, Kaoru, who was not yet born at the time of her father's death, having been chosen for his proficiency with Modikara and his swordsmanship. When Kaoru is injured while attempting to use the Sealing Character on Doukoku, she formally adopts Takeru, making him the 19th head of the Shiba House. After defeating Doukoku in the final battle, Takeru says goodbye to Kaoru and his vassals and stays in the Shiba House with Hikoma, resuming his days now as a true samurai.

As Shinken Red (シンケンレッド, Shinken Reddo), Takeru wields the Rekka Daizantou (烈火大斬刀, Rekka Daizantō; Raging Fire Great Slicing Sword), which allows him to perform the Many Fires Profusion (百火繚乱, Hyakka Ryōran) attack via its zanbatō-like Daizantou Mode (大斬刀モード, Daizantō Mōdo). It can also assume its cannon-like Ōzutsu Mode (大筒モード, Ōzutsu Mōdo) to hold the team's personal Secret Disks and perform the Five Rings Bullet (五輪弾, Gorindan) finisher as well as the Six Rings Bullet (六輪弾, Rokurindan) finisher by adding Shinken Gold's Ika Disk to the ammunition. Using a Secret Disk with the kanji for "twin" (双, sō) created by Tanba, it can be split into a pair of swords. During the Shinkengers' team up with Kamen Rider Decade, Shinken Red uses the Blade Blade (ブレイドブレード, Bureido Burēdo) broadsword in place of his Rekka Daizantou that he loaned to the aforementioned Rider in finishing off Chinomanako Diend.

In Tensou Sentai Goseiger vs. Shinkenger: Epic on Ginmaku, Takeru transforms into the black-coated Gedou Shinken Red (外道シンケンレッド, Gedō Shinken Reddo) after being brainwashed by Brajira's Dark Gosei Power to force him into cooperating with drowning Gosei World in the Sanzu River. Despite his appearance, Shinken Red retains access to his original weapons.

Takeru Shiba is portrayed by Tori Matsuzaka (松坂 桃李, Matsuzaka Tōri). As a child, Takeru is portrayed by Masaki Takaiwa (髙岩 雅輝, Takaiwa Masaki).

==== Ryunosuke Ikenami ====
Ryunosuke Ikenami (池波 流ノ介, Ikenami Ryūnosuke) is a young man who gave up becoming a kabuki actor to answer the call of serving the Shiba House. Due to his parents' upbringing, he is extremely enthusiastic and takes his role as Takeru's vassal seriously. Ryunosuke is also the engineer behind many of the Samurai Combinations, having figured out how to combine the Origami into Tenku ShinkenOh and later into SamuraiHaOh. He is initially unreceptive towards Genta, who he once called a "wannabe" samurai. As such, Ryunosuke is typically the one to lead the other vassals in Takeru's absence. When Kaoru reveals herself, Ryunosuke becomes confused about whom to follow, because he had pledged his life to the head of the Shiba family. After he receives some advice that clears his mind, he pledges his life to Takeru Shiba. After the final battle, Ryunosuke gives Takeru a kabuki-styled farewell dance and goes back to work as a kabuki actor.

As Shinken Blue (シンケンブルー, Shinken Burū), Ryunosuke wields the Water Arrow (ウォーターアロー, Wōtā Arō), which allows him to perform the Clear and Serene (明鏡止水, Meikyō Shisui) attack.

Ryunosuke Ikenami is portrayed by Hiroki Aiba (相葉 弘樹, Aiba Hiroki). As a child, Ryunosuke is portrayed by Takumi Horikiri (堀切 拓海, Horikiri Takumi).

==== Mako Shiraishi ====
Mako Shiraishi (白石 茉子, Shiraishi Mako) is a strong-willed girl who fights for her ideals. She loves children and worked at a kindergarten prior to becoming a Shinkenger. When she was a little girl, her childhood was pushed aside when her parents moved to Hawaii without a word and left her in the care of her grandmother, who schooled her in the ways of bushidō. Chiaki and Kotoha both regard her as an older sister figure; Chiaki even addresses her as such. Though she is a horrible cook (none of the boys can stomach her cooking), Mako tries her best in order to achieve her dream of becoming a good wife and mother. Eventually, Mako is reunited with her parents and learns that her mother had become paralyzed from the waist down as a result of her tenure as the previous Shinken Pink (シンケンピンク, Shinken Pinku). After the reunion and reconciliation with her mother, Mako gains a newfound conviction to defeat the Gedoushu. Because of her gentle nature, she can read other people well, especially Takeru, and readily gives her opinion regarding the situation in question. After the final battle, Mako goes to Hawaii to live with her parents.

As Shinken Pink, Mako wields the Heaven Fan (ヘブンファン, Hebun Fan), which allows her to perform the Whole Sky Impact (迫力満天, Hakuryoku Manten) attack. In Tensou Sentai Goseiger vs. Shinkenger: Epic on Ginmaku, she performs the Pink Double Attack (ピンクダブルアタック, Pinku Daburu Atakku) with Gosei Pink.

Mako Shiraishi is portrayed by Rin Takanashi (高梨 臨, Takanashi Rin). As a child, Mako is portrayed by Marina Nakajima (中島 まりな, Nakajima Marina).

==== Chiaki Tani ====
Chiaki Tani (谷 千明, Tani Chiaki) is a lazy, irresponsible, selfish, and arrogant rebel. Initially, Chiaki had no interest in becoming Takeru's vassal and often clashed with him. The only reason he even worked with Takeru was because he thought it would be fun and he wanted to protect people. He is a great strategist despite his delinquency, and comes to respect Takeru as a rival when he realizes the limits of his own abilities, pledging to pass Takeru in skill someday. Chiaki was without his mother from an early age and was raised solely by his father, who planted in him the seed of his interest in martial arts. Despite not being formally trained, he is an excellent strategist and adept with surprise attacks, thanks to his imagination and free-spiritedness. When Genta arrives, Chiaki is the first to accept him into the team. Chiaki is very protective of Kotoha and seems to be uncomfortable when Genta's friend shows an interest in her. Even though he often butts heads with Ryunosuke, Chiaki respects him immensely for his skill; in fact, they work together so well that they become able to execute tasks in sync with one another. During time off from his duties, or when he is troubled, he often plays Tekken 6: Bloodline Rebellion. He prefers American surf wear and skate wear brands like Vans and especially Gotcha, whose vintage shirts he wears in most episodes. After the final battle, Chiaki plans to take his college entrance exams.

As Shinken Green (シンケングリーン, Shinken Gurīn), Chiaki wields the Wood Spear (ウッドスピア, Uddo Supia), which allows him to perform the Large Tree Late Bloomer (大木晩成, Taiki Bansei) and Foliage Concealment (木の葉隠し, Konoha Kakushi) attacks.

Chiaki Tani is portrayed by Shogo Suzuki (鈴木 勝吾, Suzuki Shōgo).

==== Kotoha Hanaori ====
Kotoha Hanaori (花織 ことは, Hanaori Kotoha) is a clumsy and gentle 16-year-old girl who worked in a bamboo shop and speaks with a Kyoto accent (京都弁, Kyōtoben). Very much a crybaby as a child, she is close to her older sister, Mitsuba, who had been training to be Shinken Yellow (シンケンイエロー, Shinken Ierō). When Mitsuba became ill and unable to serve as Takeru's vassal, Kotoha stepped up to take her place. Kotoha is deeply respectful of Takeru and wants to help him in any way she can. She has rather low self-esteem; she genuinely believes that she is stupid (she claims that the only things that she is proficient at are her swordsmanship and her flute playing) and, despite her teammates' affection for her, often feels that she is a bother to them. She idolizes Mako and strives to become more like her. Kotoha often suggests that if Mitsuba never fell ill, the Shinkengers as a whole would probably be much stronger. However, her spirits are raised after she receives a letter from Mitsuba, in which Mitsuba says that Kotoha is the true Shinken Yellow. After the final battle, Kotoha returns home to Mitsuba.

As Shinken Yellow, Kotoha wields the Land Slicer (ランドスライサー, Rando Suraisā), which allows her to perform the All Out Earth Power (奮闘土力, Funtō Doryoku) attack.

Kotoha Hanaori is portrayed by Suzuka Morita (森田 涼花, Morita Suzuka). As a child, Kotoha is portrayed by Ayu Matsuura (松浦 愛弓, Matsuura Ayu).

==== Genta Umemori ====
Genta Umemori (梅盛 源太, Umemori Genta) is the son of a sushi chef who mysteriously disappeared prior to the beginning of the series, and a childhood friend of Takeru's. As a child, he often meddled in Takeru's training, which annoyed Hikoma greatly. Genta promised to help Takeru become a samurai, and in return, Takeru entrusted him with the Ika Disk. Years later, he is shown to have inherited the Gold Zushi (ゴールド寿司, Gōrudo Zushi) sushi cart and to have developed his own Electronic Modikara (電子のモヂカラ, Denshi no Mojikara), using the Sushi Changer (スシチェンジャー, Sushi Chenjā) cellphone to compensate for his lack of calligraphy training by typing the kanji needed. The other Shinkengers are initially suspicious of Genta until he makes his formal introduction as Shinken Gold (シンケンゴールド, Shinken Gōrudo), after he saves his teammates from a powerful Ayakshi. Though Takeru is reluctant at first, he eventually allows Genta to fulfill his promise and join the team. Genta considers himself Takeru's best friend, despite their personalities being complete opposites; Genta is as hyperactive and expressive as much as Takeru is reserved and stoic. When Kaoru reveals herself, Genta initially disapproves of her because of his relationship with Takeru, but later accepts her when he sees that she is very kind. After the final battle, Genta leaves to open a restaurant with DaiGoyou in Paris in hopes of fulfilling his lifelong dream of receiving a three-star rating by the Michelin Guide.

Unlike the primary Shinkengers, Genta utilizes the Sushi Disk in conjunction with the Sushi Changer to convert the latter from Shari Mode (シャリモード, Shari Mōdo) to Sushi Mode (スシモード, Sushi Mōdo) and transform into Shinken Gold. In battle, he uses sushi-themed accouterments, such as exploding chopsticks that he uses as projectile weapons. His sidearm is the Sakanamaru (サカナマル) a tantō modeled after a fish (魚, sakana) that allows him to take out an entire platoon of Nanashi through Iaido.

Genta Umemori is portrayed by Keisuke Sohma (相馬 圭祐, Sōma Keisuke). As a child, Genta is portrayed by Ryota Koshiba (小柴 亮太, Koshiba Ryōta).

=== Secret Disks ===
The Secret Disks (秘伝ディスク, Hiden Disuku) are a series of items that the Shinkengers use in conjunction with their respective weapons. When not in use, they are normally stored in the buckle of their belts.

- Shishi Disk (獅子ディスク, Shishi Disuku): Shinken Red's personal pyrokinetic Secret Disk that allows him to perform the (True) Fiery Dance ((真) 火炎之舞, (Shin) Kaen no Mai) attack.
- Ryu Disk (龍ディスク, Ryū Disuku): Shinken Blue's personal hydrokinetic Secret Disk that allows him to perform the (True) Current's Dance ((真) 水流之舞, (Shin) Suiryū no Mai) and Water Curtain (水之幕, Mizu no Maku) attacks.
- Kame Disk (亀ディスク, Kame Disuku): Shinken Pink's personal aerokinetic Secret Disk that allows her to perform the (True) Heavenly Dance ((真) 天空之舞, (Shin) Tenkū no Mai) attack.
- Kuma Disk (熊ディスク, Kuma Disuku): Shinken Green's personal chlorokinetic Secret Disk that allows him to perform the (True) Winter Wind's Dance ((真) 木枯之舞, (Shin) Kogarashi no Mai) and Wood Character Slash (木之字斬り, Moku no Ji Giri) attacks.
- Saru Disk (猿ディスク, Saru Disuku): Shinken Yellow's personal geokinetic Secret Disk that allows her to perform the (True) Dust Cloud's Dance ((真) 土煙之舞, (Shin) Tsuchikemuri no Mai), Earth Character Slash (土之字斬り, Tsuchi no Ji Giri), and (True) Monkey Spin ((真) 猿回し, (Shin) Saru Mawashi) attacks.
- Sushi Disk (寿司ディスク, Sushi Disuku): Shinken Gold's foldable personal photokinetic Secret Disk that allows him to transform and perform the Hundred Fillets (百枚おろし, Hyakumai Oroshi) and Thousand Fillets (千枚おろし, Senmai Oroshi) attacks.
- Common Disk (共通ディスク, Kyōtsū Disuku): Allows the primary Shinkengers to access their personal weapons.
- Secret Shield Disk (秘伝シールドディスク, Hiden Shīrudo Disuku): Allows control of the Origami and Samurai Giants, and loads the Daishinken with the "Slash" (斬, Zan) Modikara.
- Lightning Disk (雷撃ディスク, Raigeki Disuku): An electrokinetic Secret Disk that allows the user to perform the Thunderbolt Dance (雷電之舞, Raiden no Mai) attack.
- Kabuto Disk (兜ディスク, Kabuto Disuku): Shinken Green's secondary Secret Disk that allows him to summon the Kabuto Origami. When used in conjunction with the Rekka Daizantou, it allows Shinken Red to perform the Beetle Five Rings Bullet (兜五輪弾, Kabuto Gorindan) finisher. It was originally used by Shinken Red until he obtains the Tora Disk. Used once by Shinken Pink.
- Kajiki Disk (舵木ディスク, Kajiki Disuku): Shinken Blue's secondary Secret Disk that allows him to summon the Kajiki Origami. When used in conjunction with the Rekka Daizantou, it allows Shinken Red to perform the Marlin Five Rings Bullet (舵木五輪弾, Kajiki Gorindan) finisher. It was originally a white disk with the kanji for "to catch" (捕, toraeru). Used once by Shinken Yellow.
- Tora Disk (虎ディスク, Tora Disuku): Shinken Red's secondary Secret Disk that allows him to summon the Tora Origami. When used in conjunction with the Rekka Daizantou, it allows him to perform the Tiger Five Rings Bullet (虎五輪弾, Tora Gorindan) finisher. It was originally a disk with the kanji for "reverse" (反, han), used by Takeru to counter Hitomidama's control over Ryunosuke and the Tora Origami.
- Ika Disk (烏賊ディスク, Ika Disuku): Shinken Gold's foldable secondary Secret Disk that allows him to summon the Ika Origami. When used in conjunction with the Rekka Daizantou, it allows Shinken Red to perform the Squid Five Rings Bullet (烏賊五輪弾, Ika Gorindan). In childhood, Takeru gave it to Genta in secret from Hikoma.
- Ebi Disk (海老ディスク, Ebi Disuku): Shinken Gold's reversible secondary Secret Disk with an Ebi Origami Side (海老折神面, Ebi Origami Men) and a DaiKaiOh Side (ダイカイオー面, Daikaiō Men) that allows him to summon the Ebi Origami. When used in conjunction with the Rekka Daizantou, it allows Shinken Red to perform the Lobster Six Rings Bullet (海老六輪弾, Ebi Rokurindan) finisher.
- Super Disk (スーパーディスク, Sūpā Disuku): Allows one of the primary Shinkengers to assume a Super Shinkenger form when used in conjunction with the Inromaru. In other media not within the series' canon, a member of the Nanashi Company is able to use the Super Disk and Inromaru to become a Super Nanashi.
- True Samurai Combination Disk (真侍合体ディスク, Shin Samurai Gattai Disuku): A Secret Disk with the kanji for "true" (真, shin) that allows a Super Shinkenger to form DaiKai ShinkenOh.
- Kyoryu Disk (恐竜ディスク, Kyōryū Disuku): Allows one of the primary Shinkengers to assume a red-coated Hyper Shinkenger (ハイパーシンケンジャー, Haipā Shinkenjā) form, transform their Shinkenmaru into the extendable serrated Kyoryumaru (キョウリュウマル, Kyōryūmaru) katana, and summon the Kyoryu Origami. Their finishers in this form are the Flash of Heaven and Earth (天地一閃, Tenchi Issen) on their own and the True Six Swords (真六重之太刀, Shin Rokujū no Tachi) with five Super Shinkengers. In other media not within the series' canon, Shinken Gold and Go-on Red are able to use the Kyoryu Disk to become Hyper Shinken Gold and Hyper Go-on Red respectively. When used in conjunction with Go-on Red's Mantan Gun as the Kyoryu Soul (恐竜ソウル, Kyōryū Souru), it grants the aforementioned sidearm's Rod Mode the same powers as the Kyoryumaru. This Secret Disk first appears in the film Samurai Sentai Shinkenger the Movie: The Fateful War.
- Attack Disk (攻撃ディスク, Kōgeki Disuku): One of DaiGoyou's personal Secret Disks with the kanji for "spin" (回転, kaiten).
- Help Disk (助太刀ディスク, Sukedachi Disuku): One of DaiGoyou's personal Secret Disks with the kanji for "light" (光, hikari).
- Origami Beast Disk (折神獣ディスク, Origami Jū Disuku): Allows a Super Shinkenger to summon the Ushi Origami. A larger version of this disk acts as the right-hand side wheel of the Ushi Origami's gissha, which becomes MouGyuDaiOh's left foot, and is used in MouGyuDaiOh's finisher.
- All Samurai Combination Disk (全侍合体ディスク, Zen Samurai Gattai Disuku): A Secret Disk with the kanji for "all" (全, zen) that allows a Super Shinkenger to form SamuraiHaOh. Similarly to the Origami Beast Disk, a larger version of this disk acts as the left-hand side of the Ushi Origami's gissha, which becomes MouGyuDaiOh's right foot, and becomes the front disk of SamuraiHaOh's cannon.
- Final Secret Technique Disk (最終奥義ディスク, Saishū Ōgi Disuku): Powers the Mougyu Bazooka.
- Samurai Combination Disk (侍合体ディスク, Samurai Gattai Disuku): A Secret Disk with the kanji for "unite" (合, gō) which allows a Super Shinkenger to form ShinkenOh.
- Super Samurai Combination Disk (超侍合体ディスク, Chō Samurai Gattai Disuku): A Secret Disk with the kanji for "super" (超, chō) which allows a Super Shinkenger to form Tenku ShinkenOh.
- Shiba House Disk (志葉家ディスク, Shiba-ke Disuku): A Secret Disk with the kanji for "Shiba House" created by Kaoru.

=== Origami ===
The Shinkengers control sentient mecha called Origami (折神; Folding Spirits). (Note: The name "Origami" (折神) is a portmanteau of "origami" (折り紙) and "shikigami" (式神).) The five main Origami are normally in Emblem Mode (エンブレムモード, Enburemu Mōdo) until they assume Animal Mode (アニマルモード, Animaru Mōdo) to support their masters. With the "Big" (大, Dai) Modikara and the command Origami Big Transformation (折神大変化, Origami Daihenge), the Origami can be enlarged into giants with the Shinkengers using their Shinkenmaru as control sticks. The three support Origami, two of which were reclaimed after being lost in the last great battle with the Gedoushu, are summoned using each of their Secret Disks and require twice the amount of Modikara than the regular Origami.

With the Go-ongers and Go-on Wings' Engines, the Origami can perform the Modikara Cannonball (モヂカラキャノンボール, Mojikara Kyanonbōru) attack.

- Shishi Origami (獅子折神, Shishi Origami): Shinken Red's personal lion-themed Origami, normally in its pentagon-shaped Emblem Form, that forms the head and torso of ShinkenOh. In battle, it charges at opponents covered in flames in its Pentagon Grand Blaze (五角大火炎, Gokaku Daikaen) attack.
- Ryu Origami (龍折神, Ryū Origami): Shinken Blue's personal Japanese dragon-themed Origami, normally in its hexagon-shaped Emblem Form, that forms the helmet and left leg of ShinkenOh. In battle, it shoots a stream of blue fire in its Dragon Waterfall (龍瀑布, Ryū Bakufu) attack.
- Kame Origami (亀折神): Shinken Pink's personal sea turtle-themed Origami, normally in its circle-shaped Emblem Form, that forms the right arm of ShinkenOh. In battle, it can create a whirlwind while spinning towards opponents.
- Kuma Origami (熊折神): Shinken Green's personal bear-themed Origami, normally in its square-shaped Emblem Form, that forms the right leg of ShinkenOh. In battle, it is able to stand up and use its claws.
- Saru Origami (猿折神): Shinken Yellow's personal Japanese macaque-themed Origami, normally in its triangle-shaped Emblem Form, that forms the left arm of ShinkenOh. In battle, it uses its fists for punching attacks.
- Ebi Origami (海老折神): Shinken Gold's personal lobster-themed Origami that was created by Genta. It is initially inactive due to not having enough Modikara until the other Shinkengers empower it with their Modikara, using the character for "active" (活, katsu). In battle, it can use its claws to either grapple opponents or perform the Futomaki Halo (太巻き光輪, Futomaki Kōrin) attack. When not in use, it resides in an aquarium with the Ika Origami on Genta's sushi cart. Genta nicknamed this Origami "Ebizo" (エビゾー, Ebizō), a name Ryunosuke disliked at first because it is the same as a great figure of kabuki, but the reference was never brought up again.
- Kabuto Origami (兜折神): Shinken Green's secondary Hercules beetle-themed Origami summoned from the Kabuto Disk that forms the right wing, head, neck, and feather tips of DaiTenku. In battle, it can either spin its head to trip opponents with its horn or fire energy blasts from long distances.
- Kajiki Origami (舵木折神): Shinken Blue's secondary marlin-themed Origami summoned from the Kajiki Disk that forms the left wing and tail feathers of DaiTenku. In battle, it can either use its bill as a sword or fire Marlin Torpedoes (舵木魚雷, Kajiki Gyorai) at opponents. Lost in the previous war with the Gedoushu, the Kajiki Origami swam the ocean until Ryunosuke finds its location and fishes it out using a reel powered by a Secret Disk labeled with the kanji for "to catch", binding said Origami to it.
- Tora Origami (虎折神): Shinken Red's secondary white tiger-themed Origami summoned from the Tora Disk that forms the main body of DaiTenku. In battle, it uses its drill-like limbs as weapons. After ending up in the land of dead in the previous war with the Gedoushu, the Tora Origami was under the control of the Ayakashi Hitodama until Takeru uses the Shishi Origami to bring it back to its senses and binds the former to a Secret Disk labeled with the kanji for "reverse".
- Ika Origami (烏賊折神): Shinken Gold's secondary squid-themed Origami, nicknamed "Ika-chan" (イカちゃん, Ikachan), summoned from the Ika Disk. In battle, it spits ink at opponents in its Squid Ink Cannon (烏賊墨砲, Ikasumihō) attack. When not in use, it resides in an aquarium with the Ebi Origami on Genta's sushi cart.
- Kyoryu Origami (恐竜折神, Kyōryū Origami): Hyper Shinken Red's personal dinosaur-themed Origami summoned from the Kyoryu Disk that possesses sharp teeth and an elastic neck. This Origami first appears in the film Samurai Sentai Shinkenger the Movie: The Fateful War. (Note: At the time of Shinkenger, the exact species of the Kyoryu Origami was originally unknown. It resembles a Sauropoda and has characteristic of early, infamously erroneous, depictions of the Vulcanodon, but the Kamen Rider × Super Sentai × Space Sheriff: Super Hero Taisen Z movie established Kyoryu Origami as part of a team of past Tyrannosaurus-themed Sentai mecha that aided the Kyoryuzin Kick Strike.)
- Ushi Origami (牛折神): Super Shinken Red's personal ox-themed Origami that drags a gissha behind it. It was the first Origami created by chance more than three centuries ago by the people of Mount Tsunobue, but due to an excess of Modikara it was unable to be controlled in those days and was sealed within the mountain until the Origami Beast Disk was created in modern times. Once brought back to its senses, Shinken Red takes the Ushi Origami for the group. ShinkenOh can ride atop of the gissha with the Ushi Origami still pulling it.

==== Samurai Giants ====
The Samurai Giants (侍巨人, Samurai Kyojin) are giant robots formed from the Origami through either Samurai Combination (侍合体, Samurai Gattai) or Samurai Transformation (侍変形, Samurai Henkei). A Samurai Giant can also equip themselves with a support Origami through Samurai Armament (侍武装, Samurai Busō).

- ShinkenOh (シンケンオー, Shinken'ō): (Note: The names of the Samurai Giants can be translated as; ShinkenOh (真剣王, Shinken Ō; "True Sword King"), DaiTenku (大天空, Dai Tenkū; "Great Sky"), DaiKaiOh (大海王, Daikai Ō; "Ocean King"), MouGyuDaiOh (猛牛大王, Mōgyū Daiō; "Great Raging Bull King") and SamuraiHaOh (侍覇王, Samurai Haō; "Samurai Lord").) The Shinkengers' first Samurai Giant composed of the five main Origami when they write the kanji for "unite" that wields the Daishinken (ダイシンケン; Great Divine Sword) and a giant Shield Disk-like Secret Shield (秘伝シールド, Hiden Shīrudo). The Shishi Origami head on its body can breathe fire in the Lion's Blaze Roar (獅子火炎哮, Shishi Kaen Kō) attack, it can take to the air with the Dragon Rising Leg (龍昇り脚, Ryū Nobori Kyaku), separate from the Kame Origami to perform the Turtle Heavenly Fist (亀天空拳, Kame Tenkūken) attack, and separate from the Saru Origami to perform the Bear Triangle Kick (熊三角蹴り, Kuma Sankaku Geri) attack. Both of ShinkenOh's arms can also fold back up to unleash a beam attack. Its finisher is the Daishinken: Samurai Slash (ダイシンケン・侍斬り, Daishinken Samurai Giri).
  - Oden/Daruma Otoshi: Although not a real transformation, this was the first form the Shinkengers had made with their Samurai Combination. In episode 2, Ryunosuke gives a brief explanation of the Samurai Combination before initiating it. Unfortunately, not knowing that it required Takeru's command through the use of Modikara, the Origami Giants merely stacked one on top of the other, Chiaki's being the bottom, followed by Ryunosuke, Mako above, Kotoha on the top, and Takeru floating around. It is referred to as Oden by Kotoha and referred to as Daruma Otoshi by the Ayakashi Ootsumuji.
  - Kabuto ShinkenOh (カブトシンケンオー, Kabuto Shinken'ō): A combination of ShinkenOh and the Kabuto Origami through the "Beetle" (兜, Kabuto) Modikara that is equipped with the Beetle Cannon (兜砲, Kabutohō). Its finisher is the Beetle Great Revolving Cannon (兜大回転砲, Kabuto Daikaitenhō).
  - Kajiki ShinkenOh (カジキシンケンオー, Kajiki Shinken'ō): A combination of ShinkenOh and the Kajiki Origami through the "Marlin" (舵木, Kajiki) Modikara that grants the ability to convert the Daishinken into Naginata Mode (ナギナタモード, Naginata Mōdo). Its finisher is the Marlin Single Sweep (舵木一刀両断, Kajiki Ittō Ryōdan).
  - Tora ShinkenOh (トラシンケンオー, Tora Shinken'ō): A combination of ShinkenOh and the Tora Origami through the "Tiger" (虎, Tora) Modikara that is equipped with four upper back-mounted drills. Its finisher is the Tiger Drill Charge (虎ドリル突撃, Tora Doriru Totsugeki).
  - Tenku ShinkenOh (テンクウシンケンオー, Tenkū Shinken'ō): The Super Samurai Combination (超侍合体, Chō Samurai Gattai) of ShinkenOh and DaiTenku through the "Super" Modikara that grants aerial combat capabilities. Its finisher is the Daishinken: Tenku Bamboo Slice (ダイシンケン・天空唐竹割り, Daishinken Tenkū Karatake Wari).
  - Ika ShinkenOh (イカシンケンオー, Ika Shinken'ō): A combination of ShinkenOh and the Ika Origami through the "Squid" (烏賊, Ika) Modikara that wields a squid head-themed spear, which allows it to perform the Squid Spear Line (烏賊槍ぶすま, Ika Yaribusuma) attack, and a tentacle-themed shield, which allows it to spray the Squid Freezing (烏賊冷凍, Ika Reitō) gas. Its finisher is the Squid Flash (槍烏賊一閃, Yariika Issen).
  - DaiKai ShinkenOh (ダイカイシンケンオー, Daikai Shinken'ō): The True Samurai Combination (真侍合体, Shin Samurai Gattai) of ShinkenOh and the Ebi Origami that dual wields the Lobster Swords. Its finisher is the Niten Ichi-ryū Turbulence Slash (二天一流乱れ斬り, Niten Ichi-ryū Midaregiri).
  - Kyoryu ShinkenOh (キョウリュウシンケンオー, Kyōryū Shinken'ō): A combination of ShinkenOh and the Kyoryu Origami through the "Dinosaur" (恐竜, Kyōryū) Modikara that wields the Kyoryutou (恐竜刀, Kyōryūtō; Dinosaur Katana). Its finisher is the Heaven and Earth Flash (天地一閃, Tenchi Issen). This combination first appears in the film Samurai Sentai Shinkenger the Movie: The Fateful War.
- DaiTenku (ダイテンクウ, Daitenkū): The Shinkengers' second Samurai Gaint composed of the Kabuto, Kajiki, and Tora Origami into a bird-like combination for dogfighting with other aerial-oriented opponents. Its finisher is the DaiTenku: Grand Crash (ダイテンクウ・大激突, Daitenkū Daigekitotsu).
  - IkaTenku Buster (イカテンクウバスター, Ikatenkū Basutā): The True Samurai Armament (真侍武装, Shin Samurai Busō) of DaiTenku and the Ika Origami into a cannon and platform for another Samurai Giant to use as a weapon in performing the Origami Grand Release (折神大開放, Origami Daikaihō) finisher. However, due to the strain of the "Destroy" (滅, Metsu) Modikara used, it can only be fired once per battle.
- DaiKaiOh (ダイカイオー, Daikaiō): The Ebi Origami's humanoid form and Shinken Gold's personal Samurai Giant, initiated through the "Change" (変, Hen) Electronic Modikara, that has four modes signified by a different face and cardinal direction, each with a different Electronic Modikara.
  - DaiKaiOh Higashi (ダイカイオーヒガシ, Daikaiō Higashi): The red-faced primary combat mode accessed from the "Light" Electronic Modikara that can use the lobster claws on its shoulders as weapons. Its finisher is the Lobster Claw True Payback (海老ばさみ本手返し, Ebibasami Honte Gaeshi).
  - DaiKaiOh Nishi (ダイカイオーニシ, Daikaiō Nishi): A green-faced defensive mode accessed from the "Wind" (風, Kaze) Electronic Modikara that wields an iron fan for deflecting attacks.
  - DaiKaiOh Minami (ダイカイオーミナミ, Daikaiō Minami): The blue-faced secondary combat mode accessed from the "Heat" (熱気, Nekki) Electronic Modikara that dual wields the twin Lobster Swords (海老刀, Ebigatana). Its finisher is the Lobster Sword Daimyo Fillet (海老刀大名おろし, Ebigatana Daimyō Oroshi).
  - DaiKaiOh Kita (ダイカイオーキタ, Daikaiō Kita): A yellow-faced combination of the Ebi and Ika Origami, also known as Ika DaiKaiOh (イカダイカイオー, Ika Daikaiō), accessed from the "Thrust" (突, Tsuku) Electronic Modikara that wields a squid head-themed spear. Its finisher is the Squid Crash (槍烏賊突貫, Yariika Tokkan).
- MouGyuDaiOh (モウギュウダイオー, Mōgyūdaiō): The Ushi Origami's humanoid form and Super Shinken Red's personal Samurai Giant that is able to unleash a torrent of firepower from its shoulder cannons in its Bull Cannon (猛牛砲, Mōgyūhō) attack. It can also use the enlarged Mougyu Bazooka as its side weapon. Its finisher is the Bull Great Revolving Cannon (猛牛大回転砲, Mōgyū Daikaitenhō).
- SamuraiHaOh (サムライハオー, Samuraihaō): The All Samurai Combination (全侍合体, Zen Samurai Gattai) of ShinkenOh, DaiTenku, and the Ika, Ebi, and Ushi Origami that involves a Samurai Giant being moved by a platform formed by the Ushi Origami's gissha. Due to its massive size, SamuraiHaOh cannot move under its own power and instead moves along using the Ushi Origami's gissha. SamuraiHaOh can use the Daishinken to perform the Daishinken: Lord Slash (ダイシンケン・覇王斬り, Daishinken Haō Giri) and Daishinken: Big Spin Slash (ダイシンケン・大回転斬り, Daishinken Daikaiten Giri) attacks. Its finisher is the Modikara Great Shot Circle (モヂカラ大弾円, Mojikara Daidan'en).
  - Kyoryu SamuraiHaOh (キョウリュウサムライハオー, Kyōryū Samuraihaō): A combination of SamuraiHaOh and the Kyoryu Origami. Its finisher is the Twelve Origami Great Samurai Slash (十二折神大侍斬り, Jūni Origami Dai Samurai Giri).
- Samurai Formation 23 (サムライフォーメーション23, Samurai Fōmēshon Tuentisurī): A formation in which ShinkenOh, DaiKaiOh, MouGyuDaiOh, EngineOh G9, and KyoretsuOh use the IkaTenku Buster to perform the Samurai Engine Super Grand Release (侍・炎神・スーパー大開砲, Samurai Enjin Sūpā Daikaihō) finisher. This formation appears exclusively in the crossover film Samurai Sentai Shinkenger vs. Go-onger: GinmakuBang!!.

== Recurring characters ==
=== Hikoma Kusakabe ===
Hikoma Kusakabe (日下部 彦馬, Kusakabe Hikoma) is Takeru's retainer and guardian. He also serves as the Shinkengers' mentor; it is he who gathered the four vassals when the Gedoushu revived. The Shinkengers affectionately call him "Jii" (ジイ; translated as "old man" or "samurai"). Every year, he gets one day off, which he uses to visit his wife's grave and visit his daughter and granddaughter. His relationship with Takeru and his vassals runs deep; he takes great care to ensure that they are safe and that they are ready to fight, and he supplies them with information and weaponry. Though Genta frequently annoys him, Hikoma acknowledges the younger man's skill with Modikara and eventually does accept and connect with him. Like Mako, he is adept at reading people and often helps the vassals with their personal problems. When he goes to the hospital to be treated for a hip injury, he happens upon the Hikari Studio and gives invaluable advice to Tsukasa Kadoya during the meeting of the worlds of Kamen Rider Decade and Samurai Sentai Shinkenger. While Hikoma does not typically take up arms himself, his "battle" is to ensure that Takeru and his vassals remain safe and will always have someplace to which they can return. When Kaoru makes her appearance, Hikoma remains loyal to Takeru, but bears no ill will towards Kaoru; he respects her for both her title and for the kind and diligent young woman that she is. After the final battle, he stays with Takeru even when he insists that he go visit his family and encourages Takeru to join him to experience other lifestyles other than just the samurai life.

Hikoma Kusakabe is portrayed by Goro Ibuki (伊吹 吾郎, Ibuki Gorō).

=== Kuroko ===
The kuroko (黒子) are the Shiba House's servants who, like their namesakes, "set up" the scene during the Shinkengers' transformation. As they do not possess Modikara proficiency, they are not able to fight against the Gedoushu physically and as such, they are not directly involved in combat, although they do help evacuate civilians away from danger. They are skilled in many comparatively mundane things and are tasked with doing household chores, and help citizens in the nearby town to the best of their ability, when the Shinkengers are not in battle. Kaoru has her own group of kuroko, who wear slightly different robes bearing the Shiba family crest.

- Sakutaro Komatsu (小松 朔太郎, Komatsu Sakutarō): A former kuroko who had previously served Masataka, much like Ryunosuke serves Takeru. After the previous head of the Shiba House died, Sakutaro lost his will to continue as a servant of the Shiba House and took to the life of a fisherman. However, meeting Ryunosuke opens Sakutaro's eyes to the reason why he had served the Shiba House as he helps Ryunosuke in obtaining the Kajiki Origami. He later secretly resumes his duty as a kuroko; he helps Ryunosuke through his own crisis of confidence, and gives Kaoru a larger fan with which she can put Tanba in his place. Sakutaro Komatsu is portrayed by Gotaro Tsunashima (綱島 郷太郎, Tsunashima Gōtarō).

=== DaiGoyou ===
DaiGoyou (ダイゴヨウ, Daigoyō) is a support robot created by Genta during his temporary fear of sushi, infusing his Electronic Modikara into a lantern in his sushi cart to be able to fight for him when needed, referring to his creator as "Boss" (親分, oyabun). (Note: The name DaiGoyou (ダイゴヨウ, Daigoyō) can be translated as "Big Order" (大御用, Dai Goyō) or "Big Mistake" (大誤用, Dai Goyō).) He is normally in the splintered form of Paper Lantern Mode (提灯モード, Chōchin Mōdo), which fires Secret Disks as projectiles, and Jitte Mode (十手モード, Jitte Mōdo), which Shinken Gold uses as a weapon to perform the DaiGoyou Jitte Strike (ダイゴヨウ十手打ち, Daigoyō Jitte Uchi) attack. He also possesses the ability to fly in Paper Lantern Mode. Genta originally designed DaiGoyou after the lanterns carried by the Jitte-wielding okappiki (岡っ引き) guardsmen from old samurai films. Ryunosuke points out that these were mere guardsmen and not samurai, so the kanji for Samurai on DaiGoyou's lantern is actually a misrepresentation, much to the latter and Genta's chagrin.

Once enlarged by the "Big" Modikara, Daigoyou can change into a Samurai Giant by combining his Paper Lantern and Jitte Modes through DaiGoyou Big Transformation (ダイゴヨウ大変化, Daigoyō Daihenge). In battle, he can retract his head and compress his torso to dodge enemy attacks, and perform the DaiGoyou Big Lighting (ダイゴヨウ大点灯, Daigoyō Daitentō) and DaiGoyou Big Spin (ダイゴヨウ大回転, Daigoyō Daikaiten) attacks. However, he requires occasional Secret Disk jam-clearing, which is accomplished by simply slapping the bottom of the lantern's handle. His finisher is the Secret Disk Turbulence Shot (秘伝ディスク乱れ撃ち, Hiden Disuku Midareuchi).

- Shinken DaiGoyou (シンケンダイゴヨウ, Shinken Daigoyō): A combination of DaiGoyou and the Ryu, Kame, Kuma, and Saru Origami that wields the former's Jitte Mode parts as a weapon. Its finisher is the Jitte Straight (十手一直線, Jitte Itchokusen).

Daigoyou is voiced by Hironori Miyata (宮田 浩徳, Miyata Hironori).

=== Kaoru Shiba ===
Kaoru Shiba (志葉 薫, Shiba Kaoru) is the true 18th head of the Shiba House, a position that Takeru was holding in her place. She is referred to by her vassals and servants as Princess (姫, Hime). As the head of the Shiba House, Kaoru is the one who possesses the knowledge of the Sealing Character (封印の文字, Fūin no Moji) also known as the Gedou Seal (外道封印, Gedō Fūin), a Modikara passed along the Shiba bloodline. (Note: The kanji is fictional, but is composed of the kanji for Mon (門, "Gate"), A (亞, "Sub-"), Ken (剣, "Sword"), and Honō (炎, "Flame").) Because of this, she stayed in hiding while Takeru acted as her kagemusha to draw the Gedoushu away from her. When she grows tired of living in hiding, she masters the Sealing Character to defeat the Gedoushu and assumes her birthright. Even though she is kind and easy to work with, she underestimates the vassals' dedication to Takeru, and when she is injured in attempting to use the Sealing Character, she adopts Takeru and gives up her birthright to allow Takeru to lead the Shinkengers in defeating Doukoku. She makes another appearance in Tensou Sentai Goseiger vs. Shinkenger: Epic on Ginmaku, combining her Modikara with Alata's Gosei Power to create the Kaentornado card, which is used to free Takeru from his Gedou Shinken Red form, and allow all the Shinkengers to utilize Super Shinkenger forms.

Like Takeru, Kaoru possesses the ability to become Shinken Red, referred to as Princess Shinken Red (姫シンケンレッド, Hime Shinken Reddo) to differentiate from Takeru's version. Her secret training allows her to easily adopt all of the weaponry the others had used before her appearance, such as utilizing the Inromaru to become Super Shinken Red.

Kaoru Shiba is portrayed by Runa Natsui (夏居 瑠奈, Natsui Runa).

=== Gedoushu ===
The Gedoushu (外道衆, Gedōshū; "Heretic Party") are malevolent spirits who arise as the result of sin-tainted souls that enter into the Sanzu River within the land of the dead. (Note: "Gedoushu" literally translates as "Heretical Party" (外道衆, Gedōshū). Gedō (外道) is also a term for a state of existence outside the six realms of Buddhist cosmology. The "Kusare" in Kusare Gedoushu literally means "rotting" (腐れ, kusare).) The Gedoshu maintain their wretched existence with the water of the Sanzu, and in order to maintain the river's levels, they constantly enter into the human world with the intent of running amok in order to feed the river with the negative emotions of humans. If a Gedoshu spends too long in the human world, it eventually dries out, and petrifies if it can not return to the Sanzu. Cursed to be in a state between life and death, a Gedoushu can only be free of its existence if it is slain upon taking its Second Life, or if it is able to let go of the upādāna that damned it in the first place. The Gedoushu under Doukoku reside on the Rokumon Junk (六門船, Rokumonsen; "Six realms ship") that sails along the Sanzu River. Others spend their time within the River itself until Doukoku or some other powerful being calls them. Using their ability to enter the living world through cracks and narrow gaps, Doukoku's minions set up a plan to terrorize humans in any way possible so that the river overflows to the point of flooding into the mortal realm in order for them to invade in full fury. The Gedoushu can also become more powerful during the time of the Bon Festival.

In the world of Shinkenger, the Gedoushu are the inspiration of all the yōkai in Japanese mythology. The main Gedoushu characters are modeled after the Seven Lucky Gods and sea creatures.

==== Doukoku Chimatsuri ====
Doukoku Chimatsuri (血祭 ドウコク, Chimatsuri Dōkoku) is the Bishamonten/spiny lobster-themed leader of the Gedoushu. (Note: The names of the Gedoushu members can be translated as; Doukoku Chimatsuri (血祭慟哭, chimatsuri dōkoku; "bloodbath wailing"), Tayu Usukawa (薄皮太夫, usukawa tayū; "thin-skinned courtesan"), Shitari of the Bones (骨のしたり, hone no shitari; "triumphant bones"), Juzo Fuwa (腑破十臓, fu ha jū zō; "disemboweling ten organs"), Akumaro Sujigarano (筋殻の悪麿, sujigara no akumaro; "sinewy husked evil one"), Manpuku Aburame (脂目満腹, aburame manpuku; "greasy eye, full stomach"), Nanashi Company (名無し連中, nanashi renjū; "nameless grunts"), Nosakamata (逆叉, sakamata; "killer whale") and Susukodama (煤木霊; "soot kodama").) He is in a constant state of rage, originally endless until he heard the sound of Usuyuki's shamisen, becoming obsessed with her as he later takes her upon her rebirth into Tayu to soothe his rage along with sake. He targeted the Shiba House's previous Shinkengers, making it his goal to eliminate the Shiba House so no one would be able to stop him. However, while fighting the 17th head of the Shiba House, he was sealed away as the previous Shinken Red died. This seal was incomplete, and Doukoku was able to revive by the time of the next generation. To reach his goal again, Doukoku sends out Ayakashi to terrorize humans so the Sanzu River can overflow its banks into the mortal realm and enable him to unleash his full fury. This method of attack was later revealed to how he loses the rejuvenating qualities of its waters much faster than any other member of the Gedoushu and takes longer to soak the river's waters back into his body.

Learning of the seal placed on him, Doukoku briefly changes his plans to target Takeru as the death of the Shiba House would ensure that he would never be sealed again. But when that plan failed, Doukoku has his force carry on the original plan without giving wind of this knowledge to any Ayakashi with his own agenda. During the summer while in a comatose state that leaves him open to his enemies, Doukoku manages to suppress his magnified power. Later, after learning of Akamaro's true colors, Doukoku risks his life to enter the mortal realm to repair Tayu's shamisen after driving off Akumaro and defeating Shinken Red. As a result, he has to be submerged in the Sanzu River to rehydrate. But after the Shiba House's true 18th head is revealed, Doukoku's followers attempt to speed up his awakening by increasing the amount of suffering until Tayu uses Shinza's anguish to bring Doukoku back to the mortal realm. After absorbing Tayu's energy to heal his body, Doukoku gains immunity to the Sealing Character and can now endure being in the mortal realm without drying up. As a result, Doukoku overpowers the Shinkengers before bringing the Rokumon Junk into the mortal realm when the Sanzu River floods the city. Thinking he had broken the Shinkengers' spirits when they attempt to defeat him, Doukoku is immobilized before Shinken Blue delivers the final blow. Assuming his second life, Doukoku overpowers SamuraiHaOh, blasting it and throwing off its components until only ShinkenOh remains, then impales it on his sword. However, the Shinkengers take advantage of the events and mortally wound him before he explodes. He attempts to take the Shinkengers down with him, but this fails as they survive the explosion.

Doukoku's personal weapons are the Shōryū Bakuzantō (昇竜抜山刀; Rising Dragon Mountain-Removing Sword) and the Kōryū Gaiseitō (降竜蓋世刀; Descending Dragon World-Covering Sword). He also possessed the power to seal his fellow Gedoushu.

Doukoku is voiced by Rintarō Nishi (西 凛太朗, Nishi Rintarō).

==== Tayu ====
Tayu Usukawa (薄皮 太夫, Usukawa Dayū) is Doukoku's Benzaiten/sea slug/Futakuchi-onna-themed right hand and the only one he is kind to, provided she knows her place as his obedient, unquestioning servant. (Note: Because of the nature of rendaku in Japanese, her name is only Usukawa Dayu when it is said in full; otherwise, it is Tayu. Thus, the December 2009 issue of Hyper Hobby magazine lists her name in English as "Tayu".) Doukoku takes her in after her rebirth as a Gedoushu, giving her the name she now goes by and telling her that she has nowhere else to go but to him. But her unique origins set her apart from normal Gedoshu as she can move freely in the mortal realm. In life, she was Usuyuki (薄雪) a shamisen player who obsessed over a man named Shinza. Scorned that he loved another woman instead of her, Usuyuki set fire to the building holding his wedding ceremony, killing him, his bride, and the entirety of their wedding party, in a suicidal crime of passion. Seeing that her love would remain unrequited to the bitter end, Usuyuki's emotions corrupt her soul and caused her rebirth into Tayu.

Of all the Gedoushu, Tayu has the most trouble getting along with the Ayakashi because of her previous life as a human, which she makes attempts to reclaim. One failed attempt results with her being saved by Juzo, developing feelings for the Gedounin as she begins to defy Doukoku's orders with her shamisen damaged as a result. Though her feelings for Shinza had long died, Tayu refuses to give him up as it would end her existence and desires to know the purpose behind it. Leaving Doukoku, Tayu wanders aimlessly until she is found by Akumaro who recruits her to his group in return for her instrument's restoration. Upon learning that Akamaro never intended to repair her instrument, she attempts to reclaim her shamisen until Dokouku comes to her aid, using a piece of his body to restore the shamisen and reminding her of her place by his side. Soon after Akumaro's demise, Tayu returns to the Rokumon Junk to assist in Doukoku's reawakening. To that end, after finally having the answers to her questions, Tayu deliberately has Shinken Pink destroy her shamisen to not only discard her past life, but to also use Shinza's anguished soul to revive Doukoku. She later uses the last of her powers to restore Doukoku's body, giving him immunity to the Sealing Character and independence from the Sanzu River. With only her kimono remaining, Doukoku later throws it into the Sanzu River as a final respect to her.

Tayu's shamisen is forcefully bounded to Shinza's soul, creating the eerie and unsettling songs that serve to soothe Doukoku's rage. The shamisen's headstock also doubles as the hilt of a shortsword Tayu uses in battle. While her shamisen is under "repair" by Akumaro, Tayu uses the Sange Hankontō (散華斑痕刀; Glorious Death Spotted-Scars Sword) dagger as her alternative weapon.

Tayu is voiced by Romi Park (朴 璐美, Paku Romi), who also portrayed Usuyuki in her lone appearance on-screen.

==== Shitari ====
Shitari of the Bones (骨のシタリ, Hone no Shitari) is the Fukurokuju/squid-themed Gedoushu's strategist, a squid-headed demon with a shakujō who awaited for Doukoku's revival. Shitari sees humans as mere specimens for his research, uncovering means to overflow the Sanzu River. He also possessed texts from the Shiba House which he used to learn about the seal placed on Doukoku. Though he warns Doukoku not to trouble himself with the Shiba House's sealing character so not to attract attention from certain Ayakashi, Shitari recruits Isagitsune in an attempt to slake his curiosity on what the sealing character is. He later recruits Oinogare in an attempt to re-open a well the Gedoushu used in the past as their base of operations by sacrificing nine maidens, formally introducing himself to the Shinkengers as a result.

While Doukoku is in a vulnerable state struggling with his surging power, the rogue Ayakashi Gozunagumo bullies Shitari into extorting the sealing character from Shinken Red. Despite poisoning Takeru, Shitari fails to get him to reveal the sealing character due to the combined interference of Shinken Gold and Juzo. When Doukoku revives and punishes Gozunagumo, Shitari freely confesses that the one thing he values above Doukoku is his own life and gains forgiveness from his leader out of amusement with his honesty. When Akumaro arrives, Shitari expresses a great deal of distrust over the mysterious Gedoushu and not as much shocked when his impression of him was accurate yet was powerless to do anything against him as he realized Akumaro's intentions. After Tayu returns, Shitari decides to kill off Takeru, only to learn the truth behind him and the Shiba House's true leader and giving up one half of his life, in an attempt to speed up Doukoku's reawakening at the cost of having no second life should he be killed. He remains on the Rokumon Junk during Doukoku's final battle with the Shinkengers, going down with the ship as it sinks in response to its master's death while proclaiming that he will survive regardless of what happens.

Shitari later returns in Tensou Sentai Goseiger vs. Shinkenger: Epic on Ginmaku, becoming Brajira's right hand servant until learning his plan to drain the Sanzu River and refusing to go along with it. But during the climactic battle, gathering an army of followers to kill Buredoran and reclaim the Sanzu River, Shitari ends up facing the Gokaigers when they traveled from the near future and they mistakenly believe him to be a hindrance in their own affairs. With his army ultimately devastated, Shitari is destroyed by Gokai Red using the Go-On Red Ranger Key.

Shitari is voiced by Chō (チョー).

==== Juzo ====
Juzo Fuwa (腑破 十臓, Fuwa Jūzō) is a mysterious Shōjō/Jurōjin/skeleton-themed Gedoushu, regarded by the others as a lone wolf, yet he seems to know more than Doukoku about the Sanzu River's true potential. 200 years ago, Fuwa was a samurai in life who made a living as an assassin, disenchanted with the ways of bushidō and thriving more on the pleasure of killing his opponents in battle until he can no longer be physically able to wield a sword. He meets Akumaro who provides him with the Uramasa (裏正; Injustice) katana, seemingly unaware that the blade was forged from the souls of his family who tried to free him from his blood lust. When he contracts a fatal illness, Fuwa enters the Sanzu River to cheat death, completely discarding the goodness in his heart to become a Gedounin (外道人, Gedōnin), a half-Gedoushu that can freely exist in both realms and assume a human form. However, unlike other Gedounin who die out in a few years, Fuwa endured over the centuries and thus is condemned with an insatiable urge to find an ideal opponent, a fellow samurai who strays from the teachings of bushidō, to clash blades with. As a result, Fuwa mistakes the blade's cries of sadness for an equal lust for battle, believing that the souls of his family have lost their desire to stop him after he entered the Sanzu River.

He finds this opponent in Takeru Shiba, after witnessing his sword fighting as Shinken Red. This obsession with fighting Shinken Red leads Doukoku to seal Fuwa's Gedoushu powers, leaving him for dead in the Sanzu River. Although he barely survives with Tayu's aid, he continues to defy Doukoku by making sure that Takeru is at his strongest for their next fight, even curing him of Shitari's poisoning. After a long battle in which he manages to severely wound Shinken Red, Fuwa is defeated and falls off the cliff into the ocean below. However, Fuwa survives with Uramasa's blade snapped in half. He remains in the mountainside until Tayu finds him and relays Akumaro's offer to work for him in return for restoring his blade. To his chagrin, he has to rely on the replacement Bantō Dokuhōmatsu (蛮刀毒泡沫; Barbarian Sword Poisonous Bubbles) that hampers his normal fighting style. Later fed up waiting for the Uramasa to be repaired, Fuwa confronts Akumaro and learns his weapon's origins and that he is a pawn in Akumaro's plan. However, tricking Akumaro into giving him back his weapon and cutting him down, Fuwa reveals he knew the truth behind Uramasa from the first time he held it, thus preventing Akumaro from fulfilling his plan. Later, after the real Shiba House head is revealed, Fuwa gets Takeru to duel him once again before finally falling to him in battle with a delayed hit after Uramasa finally stops its master and denies him his only desire. Uramasa remains in the physical world after Fuwa fades away until the souls that formed it are finally able to depart into the afterlife.

Fuwa is portrayed and voiced by Mitsuru Karahashi (唐橋 充, Karahashi Mitsuru).

==== Akumaro ====
Akumaro Sujigarano (筋殻 アクマロ, Sujigarano Akumaro) is an Ebisu/shachihoko/crocodile-themed Gedoushu general with six slit eyes and rictus grin, whose ambition is to see Hell and savor the immense suffering that it holds. Akumaro's modus operandi is to set up far-reaching plots with dangerous consequences that would ultimately result in the completion of the Urami Gandōgaeshi (裏見がんどう返し; Reversed Look Next Scene Revelation), a spell that opens up the gates of Hell. To that end he needed a Gedonin, killing off Juzo's family to create Uramasa and setting up his descent into Gedou.

Having battled the original Shinkengers in the past, they left him immobilized at the bottom of the Sanzu River. But when Doukoku's power burst revives him, he offers his services to Doukoku as gratitude. However, Doukoku strikes him near his left shoulder, ultimately creating a vulnerable spot. While pretending to aid Dokoku's group in raising the levels of the Sanzu River, taking any abuse from Doukoku to keep up his act, Akumaro starts setting up markers and recruits Juzo and Tayu into his service to make use of them. Eventually found out to be using Doukoku for his own agenda, Akumaro falls back after Doukoku nearly destroys him. However, with Doukoku resting, Akumaro takes the Rokumon Junk as his own while making the finishing touches on his master plan by completing the final marker to open up Hell and finishing Uramasa's repairs. Although he comes close to his goal, Akumaro is left with nothing when he realizes Juzo can not complete the Urami Gandōgaeshi and goes into an enraged fury before the Shinkengers use the Rekka Daizantou and Super Mougyu Bazooka to slay him. After becoming a giant, Akumaro battles the Samurai Giants and DaiGoyou with his Kirigami before SamuraiHaOh uses the Kyoryu Origami to form Super SamuraiHaOh and destroy him, with Akumaro laughing as his desire to see Hell is finally granted with his death.

A master of the black arts, Akumaro can create monsters called Kirigami and teleport short distances to catch his opponents off guard. He also uses his iron claw hands, Sakushin Dantō Shaku (削身断頭笏; Sharpened Corpse Beheading Shaku), and kemari as weapons.

Akumaro is voiced by Ryō Horikawa (堀川 りょう, Horikawa Ryō).

==== Manpuku ====
Manpuku Aburame (脂目 マンプク, Aburame Manpuku) is the main antagonist of Samurai Sentai Shinkenger The Movie: The Fateful War, the Hotei/flapjack octopus-themed leader of the Kusare Gedoushu (クサレ外道衆, Kusare Gedōshū), a group of powerful Gedoushu that exudes a corpse-like stench that was sealed away three centuries ago by Retsudou Shiba. However, he is revived by Doukoku along with his followers during the summer-time and offers to kill off the Shinkengers for him with no intent on ruling the mortal realm. With his massive army, Manpuku overwhelmed the Shinkengers until Shinken Red breaks the seal on the Kusare Gedoushu's body to restore the Kyoryu Disk to its full power. After being slain by the primary Shinkengers, revived as a giant as he opens up into his true form with a serpentine creature sticking out of his stomach, Manpuku is destroyed by Kyoryu ShinkenOh.

Manpuku wields the Saihainonari Ikusaono (采配形戦斧; Saihai-Shaped Battle Axe).

Manpuku is portrayed and voiced by Shinya Owada (大和田 伸也, Ōwada Shin'ya).

==== Foot soldiers ====
- Nanashi Company (ナナシ連中, Nanashi Renjū; "Nameless Company"): The Gedoushu's coral/sea anemone-themed foot soldiers who wield bajō-zutsu, monk's spades, yumi, and daos. They can freely enter the mortal realm at whim. There is another group of Nanashi known as the Ōnanashi Company (大ナナシ連中, Ōnanashi Renjū; "Big Nameless Company"), who are naturally born giant with a flying variation called the Ōzora Nanashi Company (大空ナナシ連中, Ōzora Nanashi Renjū; "Sky Nameless Company").
  - In Samurai Sentai Shinkenger the Movie: The Fateful War, the Kusare Nanashi ("Rotten Nameless") and Kusare Ōnanashi Companies, part of the Kusare Gedoushu, resemble normal Nanashi and Ōnanashi but in purple-garbed attire.
  - In Samurai Sentai Shinkenger: The Light Samurai's Surprise Transformation, a rogue member of the Nanashi Company serves as the main antagonist after stealing the Inromaru and using it to become a Super Nanashi (スーパーナナシ, Sūpā Nanashi) before being destroyed by Shinken Red and Hyper Shinken Gold. He is the only member of the Nanashi Company who can speak clearly in Japanese. Super Nanashi is voiced by Bin Shimada (島田 敏, Shimada Bin).
  - In Tensou Sentai Goseiger vs. Shinkenger: Epic on Ginmaku, the Strengthened Nanashi (強化ナナシ, Kyōka Nanashi) and Strengthened Ōnanashi (強化大ナナシ, Kyōka Ōnanashi) Companies under Shitari resemble normal Nanashi and Ōnanashi but in black garbed attire. However, they, along with Shitari, are ultimately defeated by the Gokaigers.
- Nosakamata (ノサカマタ): Nozuchi/Shachinoko-themed monsters within the Sanzu River that are more powerful than the Nanashi. The Nosakamata resemble tremendous, skull-like, eyeless, crocodilian heads on two legs, and can shoot fireballs from their mouths. There are also some Nosakamata known as the Ōnosakamata (大ノサカマタ, Ōnosakamata) which are naturally born giant.
  - In Samurai Sentai Shinkenger the Movie: The Fateful War, the Kusare Nosakamata and the Kusare Ōnosakamata, part of the Kusare Gedoushu, resemble blue skinned Nosakamata and Ōnosakamata.
  - In Tensou Sentai Goseiger vs. Shinkenger: Epic on Ginmaku, the Strengthened Nosakamata (強化ノサカマタ, Kyōka Nosakamata) and the Strengthened Ōnosakamata (強化大ノサカマタ, Kyōka Ōnosakamata) under Shitari resemble black skinned Nosakamata and Ōnosakamata. However, they, along with Shitari, are ultimately defeated by the Gokaigers.
- Kirigami (切神; "Cut Spirits"): Monsters created by Akumaro from real kirigami he makes by using his claws to cut paper in the shape of a monster, which then transforms into a giant monster. The Kirigami have two variations: Those with metal pincers for hands, and those with normal hands that wield Matsuba Sōbokutō (松葉双朴刀; Pine Needle Paired Magnolia Swords).
- Bibi: See here

==== Susukodama ====
The Susukodama (スス木霊) are a furred ball-like Susuwatari settling in the roof of the Rokumon Junk's interior, appearing whenever Doukoku's infuriated enough for them to descend, annoyingly repeating people's words while giggling. One accompanies Tayu in her wandering after it is tossed out of the Rokumon Junk and into the mortal realm, singing in imitation of her shamisen. After Tayu sacrifices herself, Doukoku crushes the Susukodama by stepping on it.

==== Ayakashi ====
The Ayakashi (アヤカシ) are ancient spirits with nightmarish forms that serve the Gedoushu, dwelling within the depths of the Sanzu River until being summoned to go through a gap to the mortal world. However, they can only remain in the mortal world until they begin to dry up, returning to the Sanzu River to regain their moisture. Each Ayakashi has two lives, the human-sized first life (一の目, ichi no me), followed by the giant second life (二の目, ni no me) after they are slain in their first life.

- Kagekamuro (カゲカムロ): The first of the Ayakashi, an Ōkaburo-themed Ayakashi who wields the Hiki Sōgantō (悲喜双顔刀; Joy and Sorrow Paired Face Swords), two blades that double as guns. He is destroyed by Shinken Red in battle, Kagekamuro resurrects into a giant that is destroyed by the Origami. Voiced by Nobuo Tobita (飛田 展男, Tobita Nobuo).
- Ootsumuji (オオツムジ, Ōtsumuji): A Kamaitachi/centipede-themed Ayakashi who wields the Senpū Ōgamatō (旋風大鎌刀; Whirlwind Scythe Sword) and uses his hair to create gust of wind to hit his opponents in his Shinkūtsumuji Muchi (真空つむじ鞭; Vacuum-Whirl Whip) attack. Send to terrorize humans by causing massive damage and gathering all humans in the area, Ootsumuji is the first Ayakashi to be slain by ShinkenOh. Voiced by Daisuke Gōri (郷里 大輔, Gōri Daisuke).
- Rokuroneri (ロクロネリ): An arrogant Tsuchikorobi-themed Ayakashi with talent in Kaina Nobashi (かいなのばし; Stretching Arms), extending his arms to attack from long distances in the underground. Shinken Green manages to outwit Rokoruneri and destroy him, with ShinkenOh destroying the Ayakashi when revived. Voiced by Takashi Nagasako (長嶝 高士, Nagasako Takashi).
- Namiayashi (ナミアヤシ): A two-toned Shuihu/tiger-themed Ayakashi who wields the Aodake Dankatsusō (青竹断割槍; Green Bamboo Split Spear). Laidback and disturbing in personality, Namiayashi is sent by Shitari to increase the River by doing what he loves best, making others cry. Appearing in the mortal realm before a boy named Ryota, he accomplish his goal by tricking the boy with a false promise of seeing his grandfather again. His attack is the Tora Tsunami (虎津波; Tiger Tsunami), creating a tiger from the right half of his body and a Sanzu River wave from his left to take out two opponents. He is destroyed by Shinken Blue and Pink, and then destroyed by ShinkenOh. Voiced by Kōji Tobe (戸部 公爾, Tobe Kōji).
- Yanasudare (ヤナスダレ): An Ittan-momen/willow-themed Ayakashi who wields the Ryūshi Rendanjū (柳糸連弾銃; Slim-Thread Two-Handed Gun) and is immune to any physical attack. He attacks whatever he considers pointless to exist in order to send humans into a state of utter despair. But as he can be hurt with Modikara, Yanasudare is destroyed by Shinken Red using the Kabuto Disc's power and then destroyed by Kabuto ShinkenOh. Voiced by Hiroshi Tsuchida (土田 大, Tsuchida Hiroshi), who previously played Saizou/NinjaBlue, in Ninja Sentai Kakuranger.
- Zuboshimeshi (ズボシメシ): A Satori/mushroom-themed Ayakashi who wields the Shitasaki Sanjakutō (舌先三尺刀; Tip of the Tongue Three-Foot Sword). He is sent to raise the Sanzu River by tapping in the mind of his victims and finding the one word that best describes them negatively to turn their emotional pain into a physical one. Due to Shinken Yellow's upbringing, she is unaffected consciously and drives Zuboshimeshi off. Resurfacing later, he goes after Shinken Yellow until Shinken Green's meddling allows the Ayakashi's mouth to gagged, then immediately slain with the Kabuto Five Rings Bullet before destroyed again by Kabuto ShinkenOh. Voiced by Issei Futamata (二又 一成, Futamata Issei).
- Yamiororo (ヤミオロロ): A Kodama/cedar tree-themed Ayakashi who is born in the depths of the Sanzu River, able to breathe out a poison that kills the victim in a few days, and wields the Edamata Sensenken (枝又尖扇剣; Branching Sharp Fan Sword). Clinging to the Rokumon Junk and annoying Doukoku, Yamiororo is sent to the mortal realm to do as much damage as his predecessor had done in the past. However the power of the Kajiki Origami neutralizes his poison as he is destroyed by the Kajiki Five Rings Bullet and then destroyed by Kajiki ShinkenOh. Voiced by Hideyuki Umezu (梅津 秀行, Umezu Hideyuki).
- Hitomidama (ヒトミダマ): Hitomidama is an arrogant showy Hitotsume-kozō/oyster-themed Ayakashi who wields the Ōkainonari Tedate (大貝形手盾; Large Shell-Shaped Shield), a whip, and possesses the ability to take control over his opponents, making them puppets to his will. He used this ability on both Tora Origami and Ryunosuke, having them fight for him. But after Takeru frees Ryunosuke from Hitomidama's control, he frees the Tora Origami as the Ayakashi is destroyed by the vassals and then destroyed by Tora ShinkenOh. Voiced by Ryuzou Ishino (石野 竜三, Ishino Ryūzō).
- Okakurage (オカクラゲ): A Kasa-obake/jellyfish-themed Ayakashi who wields the Sakasarokkotsu Tansō (逆六骨短槍; Inversed Six-Boned Short-Spear), using it to conjure rain storms whose rain drops induce despair on those it rains on, calling it a blessing. Okakurage can also unfold the umbrella on his head to fly and thus have an advantage over his land-based opponents. Okakurage was destroyed by Shinken Green, overwhelming ShinkenOh as a giant until DaiTenku is formed to counter the Ayakashi in the air before finishing him off. Voiced by Hidenari Ugaki (宇垣 秀成, Ugaki Hidenari).
- Ushirobushi (ウシロブシ): An Otoroshi-themed Ayakashi and the most feared among the Ayakashi who wields the Onikōbe Sekkeitō (鬼首楔形刀; Oni's Head Wedge Sword) that he uses in his Oni Sword Two-Step Slash (鬼刀二段斬り, Onigatana Nidan Giri) attack. He is sent by Shitari to kill Shinken Red, but Juzo's interference forces him to fall back when he starts to dry up. Ushirobushi later resumes his task, only to be destroyed by the Tora Five Rings Bullet and finally destroyed by Tenku ShinkenOh. Voiced by Junichi Suwabe (諏訪部 順一, Suwabe Jun'ichi).
- Nakinakite (ナキナキテ): A Konaki-jiji/poison dart frog-themed Ayakashi who wields the Niekane Jigokukon (沸鉄地獄棍; Seething Iron Hellish Cane). He is sent to deploy his Shiro-Oniko (白鬼子, Shirooniko; "White Oni Child") to take over a child's place, placing the original in a state of sadness. Nakinakite can also create the deadly infantile Aka-Oniko (赤鬼子, Akaoniko; "Red Oni Child") that latch onto his opponents and slowly increase in weight over time if unhappy, eventually crushing his opponents. Nakinakite is destroyed by Shinken Pink and Yellow, and then destroyed by ShinkenOh after he was being weighed down by DaiTenku. Voiced by Rokuro Naya (納谷 六朗, Naya Rokurō).
- Hachouchin (ハチョウチン, Hachōchin): A Chōchin'obake/Komusō-themed Ayakashi that has the features of an elephant and is capable of breathing fire. Being extremely short tempered, he actually provoked Doukoku out of not being called forth before Tayu convinces him to turn his anger issue on the humans. When the Shinkengers attempt to fight him, they learn that only Shinken Blue's Modikara can wound him. He was first destroyed by the Kajiki Five Rings Bullet and then destroyed by Tenku ShinkenOh. Voiced by Yoshimitsu Shimoyama (下山 吉光, Shimoyama Yoshimitsu).
- Narisumashi (ナリスマシ): A happy go-lucky Noppera-bō/clown/bell pepper-themed Ayakashi with the ability to assume the guise of another who wields the Urizane Fukusōtō (瓜実複相刀; Melon Diploid Sword) that can split into two. His attack is the Finishing Darkness Slash (必殺暗黒斬り, Hissatsu Ankoku Giri) with his Urizane Fukusōtō. He assumed Chiaki's form to cause trouble among the team, intending to kill the confused and depressed Chiaki once he complete his plan. However, seeing his reflection, Chiaki tricks him in order to expose him to the others. He was first destroyed by the Kabuto Five Rings Bullet and then destroyed by Tenku ShinkenOh. Voiced by Masaru Ōbayashi (大林 勝, Ōbayashi Masaru).
- Marigomori (マリゴモリ): A whiny, introverted Sazae-oni/armadillo-themed Ayakashi with the ability to curl into his snail-like ironclad armor who's bent on making everyone more miserable than he is. But using a combination of heat and water, the Shinkengers manage to weaken the shell to use the Tora Five Rings Bullet to destroy him. Revived, he is weakened by the elemental attacks of ShinkenOh's Kabuto and Kajiki armor forms before it becomes Tora ShinkenOh to finish him off. Voiced by Mitsuhiro Ichiki (市来 光弘, Ichiki Mitsuhiro).
- Isagitsune (イサギツネ): A Tengu/Kitsune-themed Ayakashi master of the black arts with knowledge of 100 spells who wields the Teni Yōsenken (天為葉扇剣; Natural Leaf-Fan Sword). Using his Fox Concealment Spell (狐隠れの術, Kitsune Gakure no Jutsu), he steals a hair from Takeru to conduct his Mirror Reflection Spell (鏡映しの術, Kagami Utsushi no Jutsu) to spy on Takeru to look for the sealing character until his cover is blown. His other spells include Fox Whirling Spell (狐つむじの術, Kitsune Tsumuji no Jutsu), Foxfire Spell (狐火の術, Kitsunebi no Jutsu), Fox Throwing Stones (狐つぶて, Kitsune Tsubute), Fox Technique Reversal (狐技返し, Kitsune Waza Gaeshi), Copycat Fox (真似狐, Mane Gitsune), and Yatagarasu Spell (八咫烏の術, Yatagarasu no Jutsu). He is destroyed by Shinken Gold, and then destroyed by Tenku ShinkenOh with help from the Ika Origami. Voiced by Ikuya Sawaki (沢木 郁也, Sawaki Ikuya).
- Hyakuyappa (ヒャクヤッパ): A dangerous Amikiri-themed Ayakashi master of 100 blades who wields the Muradachi Senjintō (群立千刃刀; Standing Thousand-Blades Sword) and is able to use the bladed projections on his body as tendrils. His attacks include Full-Body Blades (全身刃, Zenshin Yaiba) and Shuriken Turbulence Shot (手裏剣乱れ撃ち, Shuriken Midareuchi). He goes to fight the Shinkengers to avenge Isagitsune, nearly killing the five before he falls back into the Sanzu River. By the time he resumes his campaign of vengeance, the Shinkengers have Shinken Gold by their side. He is destroyed by a Fiery Dance/Hundred Fillets combo, Hyakuyappa battled ShinkenOh upon being revived before Shinken Gold arrives in the Ika Origami to form Ika ShinkenOh who freezes the Ayakashi before finishing him off with Squid Flash. Voiced by Chihiro Suzuki (鈴木 千尋, Suzuki Chihiro).
- Oinogare (オイノガレ) (19): An Abura-sumashi-themed Ayakashi aiding Shitari in sacrificing schoolgirls who wields the Aburatsuki Nameribantō (油坏滑蛮刀; Oil Dish-Slip Barbarian Sword) and is able to slip his opponents' attacks. His attack is the Sanzu Oily Hell (三途の油地獄, Sanzu no Abura Jigoku), which allows him to disarm his opponents by making their weapons too slippery to be held in their hands. However, the attack was used against him when Shinken Red uses his Fiery Dance attack to ignite Oinogare's body in flames as Shinken Blue and Gold (with their Shinkenmaru and Sakanamaru tied to their hands) destroy him with their Current Hundred Fillets attack. In the end, the revived Ayakasahi is frozen by Ika ShinkenOh and destroyed with the Squid Flash. Voiced by Toshiharu Sakurai (桜井 敏治, Sakurai Toshiharu).
- Utakasane (ウタカサネ): An Uwan-themed Ayakashi who wields the Otomata Meikyōtō (音叉鳴響刀; Tuning Fork Echo Sword). He steals peoples' souls with his Soul Remove (魂離脱, Tamashii Ridatsu) and breaks up his body in his Hundred-Parts Separation (百体分離, Hyakutai Bunri) offense/defense combo. Acquiring a large number of 54 souls, including Kotoha's, Utakasane reveals the souless bodies have a day to live before falling back into the Sanzu River so that he wouldn't be destroyed before his mission is complete. However, Genta planted a Modikara on Utakasane that not only forces him back to the mortal realm when Ebi Orgami is brought to life, but also to keep him from utilizing his Hundred Separation move. He is destroyed by the Shinkengers, and then by DaiKaiOh Higashi. Voiced by Mitsuki Saiga (斎賀 みつき, Saiga Mitsuki).
- Sasamatage (ササマタゲ): A Kameosa/tortoise-themd Ayakashi who wields the Fukusui Chōgekiken (覆水長戟剣; Spilt Water Long Ji Sword). Finding the Rokumon Junk empty, Sasamatage decides to cause trouble on his own by placing his eggs on humans to make them violent. He is destroyed by the teamwork of Shinken Red, Blue and Yellow, Sasamatage enlarges and is quickly destroyed by the teamwork of Tenku ShinkenOh and DaiKaiOh. Voiced by Mitsuaki Hoshino (星野 充昭, Hoshino Mitsuaki).
- Urawadachi (ウラワダチ): An Ittan-momen/moth-themed Ayakashi who wields the Sanshi Hōtengeki (蚕糸方天戟; Silk-Thread Square Sky Ji), able to turn himself into a cloth. Lives to slurp up lives, acting out of the Gedoushu, while Doukoku is resting. He looks for a tasty life and finds it in Matsumiya, possessing the young man's clothing through his feelings for Kotoha. When Kotoha breaks Matsumiya's heart, Urawadachi is forced out before being destroyed by the Tora Five Rings Bullet and then destroyed by Ika DaiKaiOh. Voiced by Shinya Fukumatsu (ふくまつ 進紗, Fukumatsu Shinya).
- Gozunagumo (ゴズナグモ): An Ushi-oni-themed Ayakashi who is unwilling to continue taking orders from Doukoku. Gozunagumo recruits Shitari to aid him in disposing of Doukoku by finding out what the sealing character is. Though he overpowered the vassals, to give Shitari time to get the Sealing Character from Takeru, Gozunagumo is sucked back to the Rokumon Junk as the newly awakened Doukoku punishes him for his attempt on him by infusing him with his power, turning the Ayakashi into a mindless beast as he destroyed by Super Shinken Red and then destroyed by DaiKai ShinkenOh with the IkaTenku Buster. Voiced by Kunihiko Yasui (安井 邦彦, Yasui Kunihiko).
- Yumebakura (ユメバクラ): A man-eating Ayakashi Baku that looks like a rhinoceros-like monster with a sideways elephant-like head behind it. He was sent to put Tayu to sleep and remember her origin by exuding a sleep-inducing mist. Once his job is done, he then enters the dream world so he can eat the dream incarnations of his human victims (thereby killing them). However, Shinken Blue and Green enter the Dream World after him and force the Ayakashi out before breaking his hold over his victims. Appearing the next day with the Meimō Kyōmuken (迷妄凶夢剣; Delusion Nightmare Sword) and intent to eat humans after convincing by Doukoku and Shitari, Yumebakura is defeated by Super Shinken Blue and destroyed by DaiKai ShinkenOh with the IkaTenku Buster. Voiced by Jūrōta Kosugi (小杉 十郎太, Kosugi Jūrōta).
- Sogizarai (ソギザライ): A Yama-oroshi/shark-themed Ayakashi who ends his sentences with "shaka." He is able to spin around with destructive force. He is initially defeated by Super Shinken Yellow, and then destroyed by SamuraiHaOh. Voiced by Mitsuo Iwata (岩田 光央, Iwata Mitsuo).
- Mochibetori (モチベトリ): A Betobeto-san/larva-themed Ayakashi who wields the Shirahani Sukibanomata (白埴鋤歯叉; White-Clay Spade Teeth Fork). His attack is the Mochi Pellet (もちつぶて, Mochi Tsubute), firing a glob of glue which allows him to bind his opponents as long as he lives. After being slain by Shinken Blue and Green, he is destroyed by MouGyuDaiOh. Voiced by Rīchi (りーち).
- Ikusazure (イクサズレ): A Tsurubebi-themed Ayakashi who wields the Chōhazure Engaijū (帳外炎鎧銃; Peasant Fiery-Armored Gun) and is the commander of the Nanashi Rifle Squad (ナナシ鉄砲隊, Nanashi Teppōtai) and the Ōnanashi Ōzutsu Squad (大ナナシ大筒隊, Ōnanashi Ōzutsutai) formed by Shitari in response to Akumaro's constant failure. After being slain by Super Shinken Red, he is destroyed by MouGyuDaiOh. Voiced by Yōsuke Akimoto (秋元 羊介, Akimoto Yōsuke).
- Yomotsugari (ヨモツガリ): An Onmoraki-themed Ayakashi with a crow head-shaped appendage for a right hand who was summoned by Shitari for the task of killing the 18th head of the Shiba House: Takeru. To achieve that, she receives the Onibidama (鬼火弾; Onibi Bullets), created from the Sanzu River's Onibi which will cause the "Fire" (火, Hi) Modikara of its target to be consumed in flames. After being slain by Super Shinken Red, she is destroyed by the Shishi Origami when it is piloted by Kaoru Shiba, the true 18th head of the Shiba House. Voiced by Atsuko Yuya (湯屋 敦子, Yuya Atsuko).
- Oborojime (オボロジメ): Oborojime is an Enenra-themed Ayakashi who wields the Chikemuri Sakanokotō (血煙逆鋸刀; Blood-Spray Wicked Sawblade). Sent by Shitari to increase enough human suffering to wake Doukoku from his slumber, Oborojime was given half of Shitari's life force which gave him an additional third life (三の目, san no me), a serpentine mist-like form. His first two lives taken by the Mougyu Bazooka and Tenku ShinkenOh, it finally takes SamuraiHaOh to destroy Oborojime in his third life.. Voiced by Naomi Kusumi (楠見 尚己, Kusumi Naomi).

===== Akumaro's Ayakashi =====
These Ayakashi are used in Akumaro's plans to open the pathway between the mortal realm and Hell, each given an arena to cause enough anguish to create a marker.

- Abekonbe (アベコンベ): A Kasha/lion-themed Ayakashi who wields the Sujigumonokasane Nagamaki (筋雲重長巻; Cirrus Cloud-fold Nagamaki) and came into being around the same time as Doukoku, though he serves under Akumaro. Representing his master, Abekonbe emerges from bottom of the Sanzu River to offer his aid to Doukoku. Able to fire orbs from his mouth, Abekonbe possesses the power to switch people's souls with that of inanimate objects, intent on using this ability to turn the mortal realm where people unintentionally kill each other. After being forced to mortally wound his body to undo his spell upon being tricked, Abekonbe is destroyed by DaiKai ShinkenOh. Voiced by Nobuyuki Hiyama (檜山 修之, Hiyama Nobuyuki).
- Dokurobou (ドクロボウ, Dokurobō): A skull-faced Kyōkotsu-themed Ayakashi who serves under Akumaro, creepy and full of himself while wielding the Nuregami Itomayutō (濡髪糸眉刀; Wet Hair Thread Eyebrow Sword). Dokurobou has the ability to create shadow clones of himself, using them to weaken his opponents while he waits for them to falter and then make his move. But this ability is countered by DaiGoyou. Voiced by Dai Matsumoto (松本 大, Matsumoto Dai).
- Kugutsukai (クグツカイ): A Kosode-no-te/slug-themed Ayakashi who serves under Akumaro and is able to control people with strings like a puppeteer. Targeting the Takashiro Academy, Kugutsukai intends to create a puppet army out of the student body. Once he is discovered, the Ayakashi uses his army on the Shinkengers. He is slain by Super Shinken Blue before being destroyed again by Shinken DaiGoyou. Voiced by Taketora (武虎).
- Happouzu (ハッポウズ, Happōzu): A Raijū/barnacle-themed Ayakashi who wields the Shinen Ryōhotō (深淵稜堡刀; Abyss Bastion Sword) and can shoot fireballs from his body. Serving under Akumaro, he is sent to acquire the Ushi Origami by any means. When he fails, Happouzu decides to destroy the Origami instead. He is ultimately destroyed by MouGyuDaiOh. Voiced by Tetsu Inada (稲田 徹, Inada Tetsu).
- Futagawara (フタガワラ): A gluttonous Nurikabe-themed Ayakashi who serves under Akumaro, capable of consuming objects with his hands. Sent to the mortal realm, Futagawara eats everything in sight, including Ryunosuke's Shodo Phone. By the time he gets full, Futagawara is killed by Juzo and Tayu in order for Akumaro's plan to complete with the Ayakashi showing his true power. Once in his second life, Futagawara's arms are converted into two halves of a nearly impenetrable wall with a face whose eyes shoot beams. He manages to withstand DaiKai ShinkenOh's attacks before being destroyed once and for all by SamuraiHaOh, after breaching the wall and then using the Modikara Great Shot Circle. Voiced by Hisanori Koyatsu (小谷津 央典, Koyatsu Hisanori).
- Sunasusuri (スナススリ): A Preta-themed Ayakashi who wields the Kyōsa Kanbatsutō (凶砂旱魃刀; Evil Sand Drought Sword). He serves under Akumaro, using his sand to induce an insatiable appetite in humans to create the conditions of a Gaki Hell (餓鬼地獄, Gaki Jigoku) in the Kuroiwa Beach area. After being slain by Super Shinken Yellow, he is destroyed by SamuraiHaOh. Voiced by Taiki Matsuno (松野 太紀, Matsuno Taiki).
- Tsubotoguro (ツボトグロ): A Hitōban-themed Ayakashi who serves under Akumaro, sent to Kumocho to unleash a swarm of Pain Insects (絶痛虫, Zettsūchū) from his body to induce stomach pain in people. After being slain by Super Shinken Red, he is destroyed by DaiKai ShinkenOh with the IkaTenku Buster. Voiced by Keiichi Sonobe (園部 啓一, Sonobe Keiichi).

===== Other Ayakashi =====
- Chinomanako (チノマナコ): A multi-eyed Mokumokuren-themed Ayakashi who appears in Kamen Rider Decade episodes 24 and 25. He steals the DienDriver from Kamen Rider Diend and becomes the Kamen Rider-esque Chinomanako Diend (チノマナコ・ディエンド変身態, Chinomanako Diendo Henshintai), no longer dependent on the Sanzu River while able to summon Nanashi from the cracks on his body and summon monsters from cards. Causing a distortion in their world with his existence, the Shinkengers manage to destroy Chinomanako with help from Kamen Riders Decade and Kuuga. Voiced by Ryūzaburō Ōtomo (大友 龍三郎, Ōtomo Ryūzaburō).
- Azemidoro (アゼミドロ): A Dorotabō/leech-themed Kusare Ayakashi (クサレアヤカシ, Kusare Ayakashi) who wields the Suitetsu Shibyōkon (水蛭支鋲棍; Water Fluke Branched-Rivet Staff) and is the last surviving member of the Kusare Gedoushu. Intent on succeeding where Manpuku failed, Azemidoro sets up a trap for the Shinkengers, taking advantage of humans' selfless actions. In the end, he underestimates the Shinkengers and is defeated by Hyper Shinken Red before being destroyed by Kyoryu ShinkenOh and DaiKaiOh. Voiced by Kōichi Sakaguchi (坂口 候一, Sakaguchi Kōichi).
- Homurakogi (ホムラコギ): An Oboroguruma-themed Ayakashi who dual wields the twin Enma Daikarin (焔摩大火輪; Flame Mount Giant Fire Wheels), assigned by Doukoku to aid Pollution President Batcheed in Samurai Sentai Shinkenger vs. Go-onger: GinmakuBang!!. After being slain by the Shinkengers, Go-ongers, and Go-on Wings, he is used by Batcheed as a living shield and subsequently destroyed by the Origami and Engines. Voiced by Hiroyuki Yoshino (吉野 裕行, Yoshino Hiroyuki).
- Demebakuto (デメバクト): A maniacal Tenome-themed Ayakashi who wields the Saiten Tōrōsō (賽転灯籠槍; Rolling Dice Lantern Spear). After assuming his second life, Demebakuto uses his Enveloping Hands to trap the Shinkengers in a movie-based dream world with his revolving lantern and its dream-word counterparts keeping the illusion up. After breaking free, they use DaiKai ShinkenOh to turn his attack on him before finally destroying him. Voiced by Akio Suyama (陶山 章央, Suyama Akio). He appears in Samurai Sentai Shinkenger Returns.
- Guromaguro (グロマグロ): An Ayakashi who shoots water from his head and uses the Water Sealing Spell (封水の術, Fūsui no Jutsu) sealing an opponent into his water. He only appears in a manga adaptation of Samurai Sentai Shinkenger.
- Madakodama (マダコダマ): A Yamabiko-themed Ayakashi who appears in Tensou Sentai Goseiger vs. Shinkenger: Epic on Ginmaku. He aided Buredoran with his attempts to destroy the Goseigers' homeworld. He has the power to redirect the Goseigers' elemental attacks, but when the Shinkengers combined their power with the Goseigers', he was unable to redirect the attacks and was overwhelmed. After the Shinkengers, Goseigers, and Gosei Knight defeat him, he is destroyed by DaiKai ShinkenOh and Ground Gosei Great. He is the basis of the Yama-biko of Japanese myth. Voiced by Tesshō Genda (玄田 哲章, Genda Tesshō).
- Shura (修羅): An Ayakashi who appears in the Samurai Sentai Shinkenger tie-in novel. Prior to his Gedou transformation, Shura was an officer named Osamu Kujo (九条 修, Kujo Osamu), whose descent into madness started after losing his two daughters to an accident. He became a mass murderer in 2008 and was seemingly killed from a fall while on the run from the authorities. In the present day, he was resurrected into an Ayakashi and spread a virus that caused his victims to relieve the fear of losing their loved ones from their past. After being defeated in his first life, his residual thought manifests a giant version of himself which fought against Ika Shinken-Oh until he realizes the error of his ways and finally passes on to the afterlife.

=== Heads of the Shiba House ===
The previous heads of the Shiba House (Kaoru and Takeru's predecessors) are:

1. Shiba Retsudō (志葉 烈堂): Shiba Retsudō is the first Shinken Red (初代シンケンレッド, Shodai Shinken Reddo) who battled the Kusare Gedoushu, wielding the Kyoryumaru. After his death, he was buried at the Tengen Temple where the Inromaru is kept. Shiba Retsudō is portrayed by Masashi Goda (合田 雅吏, Gōda Masashi).
2. Resshin (烈心)
3. Iori (伊織)
4. Sakuya (朔哉)
5. Yukiyasu (行康)
6. Koshinari (越成)
7. Atsuhide (篤秀)
8. Katsunoshin (勝之進)
9. Akitsugu (明継)
10. Aritsugu (有継)
11. Arishige (有重)
12. Morinobu (守信)
13. Seisuke (誠輔)
14. Akira (晶)
15. Kōichirō (幸一郎)
16. Yōjirō (陽次郎)
17. Masataka Shiba (志葉 雅貴, Shiba Masataka): Kaoru's father and the 17th head of the Shiba family, he set up the idea to use a kagemusha to counter Doukoku's plans to wipe his family out of existence. Masataka sealed Doukoku using the imperfect Sealing Character just before his death; his then-newborn daughter was then taken into hiding and Takeru was presented as the new head of the Shiba House. Credited as the Previous Head (先代当主, Sendai Tōshu), Masataka Shiba is portrayed by Masaya Matsukaze (松風 雅也, Matsukaze Masaya).

== Other characters ==
- Takeru's Father (丈瑠 の父, Takeru no Chichi): Takeru's unnamed father and one of the Shiba House's vassals. He and his wife were killed in the crossfire between the 17th generation of Shinkengers and Gedoushu, entrusting Takeru with the role of kagemusha and the Shishi Origami. Takeru's father is portrayed by Kanji Tsuda (津田 寛治, Tsuda Kanji).
- Ryuzaburo Ikenami (池波 流三郎, Ikenami Ryūzaburō): Ryunosuke's father and the previous Shinken Blue, his teacher in both the ways of kabuki and bushidō. Ryuzaburo Ikenami is portrayed by Ryo Kamon (加門 良, Kamon Ryō).
- Mitsuba Hanaori (花織 みつば, Hanaori Mitsuba): Kotoha's older sister. She was meant to be Shinken Yellow, but when she suddenly falls ill, Kotoha takes her place to continue their family's support of the Shiba House. Mitsuba Hanaori is portrayed by Reika Shigehiro (重廣 礼香, Shigehiro Reika).
- Richard Brown (リチャード・ブラウン, Richādo Buraun): A foreigner who comes to idolize the Shinkengers after he is cured of the Yamiororo Poison in Act 7. He approaches Ryunosuke and asks to become his pupil in the ways of bushidō. Although Ryunosuke tries to deter Mr. Brown from becoming a samurai, his attempts fail and Ryunosuke is nearly killed after he must rescue Mr. Brown after a failed attack on Hachouchin. After Ryunosuke recovers and Mr. Brown reminds the other Shinkengers of the spirit of being a samurai, they defeat Hachouchin and Mr. Brown returns to his homeland to teach bushidō to his fellow citizens. Richard Brown is portrayed by John Kaminari (ジョン・カミナリ, Jon Kaminari).
- Kurando Tani (谷 蔵人, Tani Kurando): Chiaki's father and the previous Shinken Green. He was supposed to teach Chiaki the ways of bushidō, but instead of putting Chiaki through rigorous training, raised him to be a cheerful boy. In reality, his way of life was meant to inspire Chiaki to become a samurai on his own, rather than be conditioned into the role. Kurando Tani is portrayed by Kenichiro Kikuchi (菊池 健一郎, Kikuchi Ken'ichirō).
- Jōkan (浄寛): The chief priest of Tengen Temple, the family temple of the Shiba line, who has custody of the unfinished Inromaru. Jokan is portrayed by Gentaro Takahashi (高橋 元太郎, Takahashi Gentarō).
- Hiro Sakakibara (榊原 ヒロ, Sakakibara Hiro): A young boy who has the ability to produce Modikara that attracts wild Origami. Being of the Sakakibara clan, Hiro is entrusted with guarding the sealed Ushi Origami. Despite this, he attempts to produce a Secret Disk to control Ushi Origami, something his father attempted in vain. Hiro Sakakibara is portrayed by Yuki Sato (佐藤 勇輝, Satō Yūki). As a child, Hiro is portrayed by Sora Sato (佐藤 天, Satō Sora).
- Toji Sakakibara (榊原 藤次, Sakakibara Tōji): Hiro's grandfather, blaming the Ushi Origami for causing a landslide that resulted in the deaths of his son and daughter-in-law, so he has produced a Secret Disk with the kanji for "break" (砕, sai) that is designed to destroy it. Not only does he blame the Ushi Origami for the incident, but he also blames himself because he inspired his son to try to develop a Secret Disk that would control the rogue Origami. Toji Sakakibara is portrayed by Tetsuo Morishita (森下 哲夫, Morishita Tetsuo).
- Mamoru Shiraishi (白石 衛, Shiraishi Mamoru): Mako's father, a salaryman who transferred to a job position in Hawaii and brought Kyoko with him so she could recover from her battle ordeal. He later returns to Japan in order to bring Mako to Hawaii. He eventually comes to appreciate who his daughter has become and accepts her decision to remain with the Shinkengers in Japan. Mamoru Shiraishi is portrayed by Norimasa Fuke (冨家 規政, Fuke Norimasa).
- Kyoko Shiraishi (白石 響子, Shiraishi Kyōko): Mako's mother and the previous Shinken Pink, Kyoko was gravely injured during her group's final battle with Doukoku. Now a paraplegic, Mamoru had brought her with him to Hawaii to aid in her recovery. Though she left Mako without a word, Kyoko had never stopped thinking about her daughter. Kyoko Shiraishi is portrayed by Kazue Itoh (伊藤 かずえ, Itō Kazue).
- Kaori Sawada (沢田 香, Sawada Kaori): Hikoma's daughter, whom he left in order to fulfill his duties as retainer to the Shiba House. Understanding her father's duties, she lived a relatively normal life, later marrying Koichi Sawada (沢田 晃一, Sawada Kōichi). Kaori and Koichi have a daughter named Haruna (沢田 陽菜, Sawada Haruna). Kaori Sawada is portrayed by Maiko Kawamura (河村 舞子, Kawamura Maiko), Koichi by Yasunori Yokoe (横江 泰宣, Yokoe Yasunori), and Haruna by Kanon Kasuga (春日 香音, Kasuga Kanon).
- Toshizo Tanba (丹波 歳三, Tanba Toshizō): Kaoru's retainer. Arrogant and fiercely loyal to Kaoru, he is highly contemptuous of Takeru and, by extension, Hikoma, and demands that the Shinkengers support Kaoru without question. Tanba often speaks candidly without thinking, which sometimes annoys Kaoru; she hits him in the back of the head with a fan to express her displeasure on these occasions. Toshizo Tanba is portrayed by Kazuyuki Matsuzawa (松澤 一之, Matsuzawa Kazuyuki).

== Guest characters ==
- Daiki Kaito (海東 大樹, Kaitō Daiki): A traveling treasure hunter who can transform into Kamen Rider Diend (仮面ライダーディエンド, Kamen Raidā Diendo). He steals the Ika Origami from Genta until Chinomanako attacks them both and steals the DienDriver. Kimito Totani (戸谷 公人, Totani Kimito) guest stars as Daiki Kaito from Kamen Rider Decade.
- Tsukasa Kadoya (門矢 士, Kadoya Tsukasa): A traveling photographer who can transform into Kamen Rider Decade (仮面ライダーディケイド, Kamen Raidā Dikeido). He is assigned as one of the Shiba House's kuroko upon his arrival and helps the Shinkengers in their fight against Chinomanako. Masahiro Inoue (井上 正大, Inoue Masahiro) guest stars as Tsukasa Kadoya from Kamen Rider Decade.
- Eijiro Hikari (光 栄次郎, Hikari Eijirō): The owner of the Hikari Studio who helps treat Hikoma's hip injury. Renji Ishibashi (石橋 蓮司, Ishibashi Renji) guest stars as Eijiro Hikari from Kamen Rider Decade.
- Natsumi Hikari (光 夏海, Hikari Natsumi): Eijiro's granddaughter who works for him at the Hikari Studio. Kanna Mori (森 カンナ, Mori Kanna) guest stars as Natsumi Hikari from Kamen Rider Decade.
- Narutaki (鳴滝): A self-proclaimed prophet who tries to warn Takeru about Tsukasa. Tatsuhito Okuda (奥田 達士, Okuda Tatsuhito) guest stars as Narutaki from Kamen Rider Decade.
