= Samurai Sentai Shinkenger Returns =

Samurai Sentai Shinkenger Returns: Special Act
- Directed by: Shojiro Nakazawa
- Written by: Yasuko Kobayashi
- Produced by: Motoi Sasaki; Takaaki Utsunomiya; Takahito Ōmori; Kōichi Yada; Akihiro Fukuda
- Starring: Tori Matsuzaka; Hiroki Aiba; Rin Takanashi; Shogo Suzuki; Suzuka Morita; Keisuke Sohma; Runa Natsui; Goro Ibuki; Mitsuru Karahashi
- Music by: Hiroshi Takaki
- Production companies: TV Asahi; Toei Company; Toei Agency
- Distributed by: Toei
- Release dates: June 11, 2010 (Rental); June 21, 2010 (Sale)
- Running time: 48 minutes
- Country: Japan
- Language: Japanese

Samurai Sentai Shinkenger Returns: Special Act (帰ってきた侍戦隊シンケンジャー 特別幕, Kaettekita Samurai Sentai Shinkenjā: Tokubetsu Maku) is a V-Cinema release for the 33rd entry in the Super Sentai Series Samurai Sentai Shinkenger. It was released on DVD for rental on June 11, 2010, and for sale on June 21, 2010. An original soundtrack for the V-Cinema was released on April 28, 2010, composed by Hiroshi Takaki. The CD also features karaoke tracks of the main series' insert songs. Its footage was used in the Power Rangers Super Samurai Halloween episode Trickster Treat.

== Story ==
The film begins with the Shinkengers defeating the Ayakashi Demebakuto. As he assumes his second life, he captures the Shinkengers in mirrors as he sends them into a series of different dimensions (all different film genres) in order make them suffer for his amusement before actually killing them. First, the Shinkengers appear in the jidaigeki "Lord's Log of Notable Events", fighting a group of samurai, shortly followed by a Western showdown between Genta and Ginshirō (銀志郎), the owner of the rival sushi stand Silver Zushi, over whose food is better, in "Wild Grip". Then the scene changes again to the cop drama "Passionate Version" with the vassals as cops while Takeru is being held hostage as the Shinkengers starts to realize that something is wrong.

Before they fully remember as Ji's voice echoes, the scene changes to the high school romantic comedy where Kotoha poses a boy to be with a male Mako only to have trouble with the male Shinkengers who are also girls posing as boys. When they start to remember again, the scene changes once more to a Jungle film with the animal-themed "Forest Animal Sentai Shinkenger" fighting several Nanashi Company members to protect the forest creatures. Shinken Blue is leading the group as Super Shinken Blue until Ryunosuke remembers that he is not the leader of the Shinkengers.

The Shinkengers managed to remember their fight with Demebakuto and realize where they are as he sends them into Song where Mako is an idol with the other Shinkengers as her back up dancers before being attacked by a Nanashi upon remembering again as they end up in Disappear in Space where they battle alien versions of the Nanashi in a space ship. As each member stays behind to hold off the Nanashi, Takeru realizes a spin-related link across the movie worlds as he has everyone destroy a spinning light.

Coming to, the Shinkengers find Demebakuto once more and defeat him again. However, when he grows into a giant again, he is much larger than even Ika-ShinkenOh as he toys with them. They are unable to defeat Demebakuto until the Shinkengers realize that they have not yet escaped the dream as they manage to destroy a fan. Finally coming to, Jii tells them how the actual fight when prior to being taken in by Demebakuto's Enveloping Hands. With Super Shinken Red leading the attack, the Shinkengers form DaiKai ShinkenOh to defeat Demebakuto after trapping him in his own illusion. After the battle, the samurai thank Jii for saving them as they tell him of their experiences in the movie dimensions. Meanwhile, Takeru is upset at all of the lame roles he received in them as the group returns to the mansion.

== Cast ==
- Takeru Shiba: Tori Matsuzaka (松坂 桃李, Matsuzaka Tōri)
- Ryunosuke Ikenami: Hiroki Aiba (相葉 弘樹, Aiba Hiroki)
- Mako Shiraishi: Rin Takanashi (高梨 臨, Takanashi Rin)
- Chiaki Tani: Shogo Suzuki (鈴木 勝吾, Suzuki Shōgo)
- Kotoha Hanaori: Suzuka Morita (森田 涼花, Morita Suzuka)
- Genta Umemori: Keisuke Sohma (相馬 圭祐, Sōma Keisuke)
- Hikoma Kusakabe: Goro Ibuki (伊吹 吾郎, Ibuki Gorō)
- Ginshirō: Michael Tomioka (マイケル富岡, Maikeru Tomioka)
- Cameos: Rintarō Nishi (西 凛太朗, Nishi Rintarō), Chō (チョー)

=== Voice Actors ===
- Narrator: Hironori Miyata (宮田 浩徳, Miyata Hironori)
- DaiGoyou: Kōichi Tōchika (遠近 孝一, Tōchika Kōichi)
- Demebakuto: Akio Suyama (陶山 章央, Suyama Akio)
