= Hiroki Aiba =

Japanese actor and voice actor

- 相葉 裕樹
- Born: Hiroki Aiba (相葉 弘樹); October 1, 1987 (age 38); Funabashi, Chiba, Japan
- Occupation: Actor
- Years active: 2004–present
- Agent: Grand-Arts
- Height: 1.78 m (5 ft 10 in)

Hiroki Aiba (相葉 裕樹, Aiba Hiroki; born October 1, 1987) is a Japanese actor associated with Grand-Arts. He debuted as an actor in 2005 as Shusuke Fuji in Musical: The Prince of Tennis and also reprised his role in the live-action film The Prince of Tennis. Since then, he has appeared in other theater productions, television programs, and films, such as Ryunosuke Ikenami/Shinken Blue in Samurai Sentai Shinkenger.

== Filmography ==
| Year | Film/television | Role | Other notes |
|---|---|---|---|
| 2004 | Occult Tantei-dan Shiningyou no Hakaba | Takashi Hara | Movie |
| 2006 | Ie Kaidan | Hiroyuki Izawa | Movie, Volume 3 of the Kaidan series |
| 2006 | The Prince of Tennis | Shusuke Fuji | Movie |
| 2007 | Sukitomo | Yoshiki Saitō | Movie |
| 2007 | Delicious Gakuin | Rin Takasugi | TV drama |
| 2007 | Takumi-kun Series: Soshite Harukaze ni Sasayaite | Sachi Inoue | Movie |
| 2008 | Uramiya Honpo Special | Yūya Ōkubo | TV drama |
| 2008 | Tadashii Ouji no Tsukuri Kata | Shurinosuke Hata | TV drama |
| 2008 | Shiori to Shimiko no Kaiki Jikenbo | Ken Kurokawa | TV drama, Episode 7 |
| 2008 | Cafe Daikanyama: Sweet Boys | Hibiki Shibata | Movie |
| 2008 | Wild Strawberry | Chiaki | TV drama |
| 2008 | Teddy bear | Ryū | Mobile drama |
| 2008 | Bokura no Hōteishiki | Tomio Katō | Movie |
| 2008 | Cafe Daikanyama II: Yume no Tsuzuki | Hibiki Shibata | Movie |
| 2009 | Kasabata Hime | Kōichi Akikawa | Movie |
| 2009 | Samurai Sentai Shinkenger | Ryunosuke Ikenami/Shinken Blue | TV drama, the 33rd Super Sentai series |
| 2009 | Cafe Daikanyama III: Sorezore no Ashita | Hibiki Shibata | Movie |
| 2009 | Kamen Rider Decade | Ryunosuke Ikenami/Shinken Blue | TV drama, Episodes 24 and 25 |
| 2009 | Samurai Sentai Shinkenger the Movie: The Fateful War | Ryunosuke Ikenami/Shinken Blue | Movie |
| 2010 | Samurai Sentai Shinkenger vs. Go-onger: GinmakuBang!! | Ryunosuke Ikenami/Shinken Blue | Movie |
| 2010 | Samurai Sentai Shinkenger Returns | Ryunosuke Ikenami/Shinken Blue | Movie |
| 2011 | Tensou Sentai Goseiger vs. Shinkenger: Epic on Ginmaku | Ryunosuke Ikenami/Shinken Blue | Movie |
| 2011 | Hi wa Mata Noboru | Akira Nakasendō | TV drama |
| 2011 | Kaitō Royale | Keisuke Kurata | TV drama |
| 2012 | Saiko no Jinsei | Hiura | TV drama, Episode 5 |
| 2012 | Equal Sweets ~Okashi na Kankei | Sōya | Smartphone movie |
| 2012 | The Boy Inside | Tomonari | Movie |
| 2012 | Equal Sweets ~Okashi na Kankei | Sōya | Smartphone movie |
| 2012 | Aibō | Taishi Sakaki | TV drama, Episodes 9 and 10 of season 11 |
| 2013 | 35-sai no Koukousei | Ryuichiro Kitajima | TV drama |
| 2013 | Take Five ~Ore-tachi wa Ai o Nusumeru ka~ | Araki | TV drama, Episodes 5 and 6 |
| 2014 | Ushijima the Loan Shark 2 | Taisei Kizaki | Movie |
| 2014 | Kurofuku Monogatari | Kaoru Kasugai | TV drama |
| 2014 | Zenmō no Boku ga Bengoshi ni Natta Riyū | Shinpei Matsuda | TV drama |

Variety shows: Sengoku Nabe TV ~Nantonaku Rekishi ga Manaberu Eizō~

- SHICHIHON Yari as Fukushima Masanori
- Tenshou Kenou Shounen Shitetsu as Mancio Ito
- Bei'Z as Takenaka Hanbei
- Amakusa Shirō to Shimabara DE Midaretai as Amakusa Shirō

== Stage ==
| Year | Title | Role | Other notes |
|---|---|---|---|
| 2020 2023 | Anastasia | Dmitry | Most performances cancelled in 2020 |
| 2022 2024 | CROSS ROAD ~The Devil's Violinist Paganini~ | Niccolo Paganini | Lead role, original cast |
| 2024 | L'art Reste | Yi Sang | |
| 2025 | Wonder 3 | Nokko | |

== Voice acting ==
=== Anime ===
- The New Prince of Tennis (2012-present) - Kanata Irie

=== Video games ===
- Disney: Twisted-Wonderland (2020-present) - Vil Schoenheit

=== Dubbing ===
- S.W.A.T. (2018) - Officer III James "Jim" Street (Alex Russell)

== Awards ==
Then 16th Junon Boy Judge's Special Award (3rd Place)
