= Keisuke Sohma =

Japanese actor (born 1986)

- 相馬 圭祐
- Born: October 30, 1986 (age 39); Kanagawa Prefecture, Japan
- Occupation: Actor
- Years active: 2007–2024
- Height: 1.81 m (5 ft 11 in)

Keisuke Sohma (相馬 圭祐, Sōma Keisuke; born October 30, 1986, in Kanagawa Prefecture, Japan) is a former Japanese actor known for his portrayal as Genta Umemori/ ShinkenGold in Samurai Sentai Shinkenger.

== Biography ==
While longing to Aoi Miyazaki, Sohma sent a resume to the talent agency Hirata Office and debuted in 2007.

In 2009, he appeared in Samurai Sentai Shinkenger as Genta Umemori / Shinken Gold to raise his recognition.

In 2014, his first main role in a film was Taiyō kara Plancha.

In 2017, he left Hirata Office.

In 2021, he would join another tokusatsu series Kamen Rider Saber as the series villain Master Logos (Isaac) / Kamen Rider Solomon, as well as a posthumous supporting ally Original Master Logos.

His agency announced that Sohma would retire of the entertainment industry at the end of 2024, he retired in early 2025.

== Filmography ==
=== TV series ===
| Year | Title | Role | Network | Other notes |
|---|---|---|---|---|
| 2009 | Ghost Friends | Atsushi | NHK | Episode 7 |
| 2009 | Samurai Sentai Shinkenger | Genta Umemori / Shinken Gold | TV Asahi | |
| 2009 | Kamen Rider Decade | Genta Umemori / Shinken Gold | TV Asahi | Episodes 24 and 25 |
| 2010 | Tumbling | Jun Ishijima | TBS | |
| 2010 | Noda to Mōshimasu | Yamamoto | NHK One Seg 2 | |
| 2010 | Zeimu Chōsakan Madogiwa Tarō no Jikenbo 21 | Yūji Mimura | TBS | |
| 2011 | Noda to Mōshimasu: Season 2 | Yamamoto | NHK One Seg 2 and NHK Educational TV | |
| 2012 | Kekkon Dōsōkai: Seaside Love | | Fuji TV Two | Episode 1 |
| 2012 | Noda to Mōshimasu: Season 3 | Yamamoto | NHK One Seg 2 and NHK Educational TV | |
| 2013 | Bad Boys J | Ogi | NTV | |
| 2014 | Dr. DMAT | Tomoya Kawabata | TBS | Episode 7 |
| 2014 | Tetsuko no Sodatekata | Kaiji Hama | Mētele | |
| 2014 | Cinderella Date | Takashi Mizuno | Tokai TV | |
| 2015 | Do S Deka | Hidetoshi Nishikawa | NTV | Episode 3 |
| 2021 | Kamen Rider Saber | Isaac / Kamen Rider Solomon; Original Master Logos | TV Asahi | Isaac is credited as “Master Logos” in most episode |

=== Films ===
| Year | Title | Role | Other notes |
|---|---|---|---|
| 2008 | Fure Fure Shōjo | | |
| 2008 | Last Game: Saigo no Sōkeisen | Shunichi Nagao | |
| 2009 | Samurai Sentai Shinkenger The Movie: The Fateful War | Genta Umemori / Shinken Gold | |
| 2010 | Samurai Sentai Shinkenger vs. Go-onger: GinmakuBang!! | Genta Umemori / Shinken Gold | |
| 2010 | Hitori Kakurenbo Shin Gekijōban | Ryūji Shiraishi | |
| 2011 | Tensou Sentai Goseiger vs. Shinkenger: Epic on Ginmaku | Genta Umemori / Shinken Gold | |
| 2011 | Kyōfu Shinbun | Ryūta Nagamori | |
| 2011 | Gokaiger Goseiger Super Sentai 199 Hero Great Battle | Genta Umemori / Shinken Gold | |
| 2011 | Gal Basara: Sengoku Jidai wa Kengai Desu | Gosaku | |
| 2013 | Bakumatsu Kitan Shinsen 5 Ni: Fūun Iga Goe | Harada Sanosuke | |
| 2014 | Ore-tachi Shōkin Kasegidan | Renjirō Sawamura / Hells Face | |
| 2014 | Taiyō kara Plancha | Ryūta Ishihara | Lead role |

=== Direct-to-video films ===
| Year | Title | Role | Other notes |
|---|---|---|---|
| 2010 | Samurai Sentai Shinkenger Returns: Special Act | Genta Umemori / Shinken Gold | |
| 2012 | Gal Basara Gaiden | Shōgo | |

=== Music videos ===
| Year | Title | Artist |
|---|---|---|
| 2008 | Haru Sora | Natsuyo Ishinoda |
| 2011 | Cry For You | Kozue Ayuse |
| 2011 | Hotarubi | Kimaguren |
