= Gal Basara: Sengoku Jidai wa Kengai Desu =

- Directed by: Futoshi Sato
- Screenplay by: Jirō Kaneko; Kiyoto Takeuchi
- Starring: Kasumi Arimura; Hiroki Matsukata; Seika Taketomi; Mariko Shinoda; Shiori Ogiso; Yuria Kizaki
- Release date: November 26, 2011 (Japan)
- Running time: 110 minutes
- Country: Japan
- Language: Japanese

Gal Basara: Sengoku Jidai wa Kengai Desu (ギャルバサラ 戦国時代は圏外です) is a 2011 Japanese film directed by Futoshi Sato.

== Cast ==
- Kasumi Arimura as Asami Ōta
- Seika Taketomi as Yū
- Moe Arai as Hiroko Kikuchi
- Hiroki Matsukata as Oda Nobunaga
- Mariko Shinoda as Nene
- Kyousuke Hamao as Yohei
- Shiori Ogiso as Mayu
- Yuria Kizaki as Nao
- Kento Kaku as Kōhei
- Ren Mori as Takuya
- Shogo Suzuki as Rikichi
- Keisuke Sohma as Gosaku
