= Suzuka Morita =

Japanese actress and voice actress

- 森田 涼花
- Born: September 7, 1992 (age 34); Yamashina-ku, Kyoto, Japan
- Occupations: Actress; voice actress
- Years active: 2009-present
- Agent(s): Amity Promotion (formerly affiliated with Horipro and Mausu Promotion)
- Height: 1.57 m (5 ft 2 in)

Suzuka Morita (森田 涼花, Morita Suzuka; born September 7, 1992 in Yamashina-ku, Kyoto, Japan) is a Japanese actress and voice actress. She was a 7th generation member of Hop Club and a 2nd generation member, number 11, of Idoling!!!. She is best known for playing Kotoha Hanaori/Shinken Yellow in the TV series Samurai Sentai Shinkenger.

== Filmography ==
=== TV series ===
- Samurai Sentai Shinkenger as Kotoha Hanaori/Shinken Yellow ( 2009–2010)
- Kamen Rider Decade as Kotoha Hanaori/Shinken Yellow (24,25 episodes, TV Asahi, 2009)
- Strangers 6 (WOWOW [2011], Fuji TV [2012], MBC [2012])
- RUN60 (2 episodes, Tokyo MX, 2012)
- Tokumei Sentai Go-Busters as Shelly (31,32 episodes, TV Asahi, 2012)
- Story of Ishizaka Line as Kashiwazaki Wakako (main role, NHK, 2012)
- Iron Grandma as Aoshima Nana (guest - episode 3, NHK-BS, 2015)
- Kyoto gastronomic taxi murder recipe as Azusa Segawa (EX, 2015)
- Matsumoto Seijo Mystery (guest - episode 11, BS Japan, 2015)
- Ten Dark Women as Natsumi (YTV, 2016)
- Retake as Tachibana Marie (guest; episode 3, THK, 2016)
- Death Note: New Generation (guest; episode 2, Hulu Japan, 2016)
- Megadan ~ wearable Megane-kun (GYAO, 2017)
- Secret × Warrior Phantomirage! (guest; episode 4, TV Tokyo, 2019)

=== Movies ===
- Samurai Sentai Shinkenger The Movie: The Fateful War as Kotoha Hanaori/Shinken Yellow (2009)
- Samurai Sentai Shinkenger vs. Go-onger: GinmakuBang!! as Kotoha Hanaori/Shinken Yellow (2010)
- Mutant Girls Squad as Yoshie (2010)
- Come Back! Samurai Sentai Shinkenger as Kotoha Hanaori/Shinken Yellow (2010)
- Tensou Sentai Goseiger vs. Shinkenger: Epic on Ginmaku as Kotoha Hanaori/Shinken Yellow (2011)
- Mahō Shōjo o Wasurenai as Chika (2011)
- Hankyū Densha (2011)
- Space Sheriff Gavan: The Movie as Shelly (2012)
- The British Rule Attack as Queen Luka (2012)
- Anata no Shiranai Kowai Hanashi Gekijoban (2012)
- Ima, Yari ni Yukimasu as Nao (2012)
- Keitai Kareshi + (Mobile Boyfriend +) (2012)
- Kamen Rider × Super Sentai × Space Sheriff: Super Hero Taisen Z as Shelly, Kotoha Hanaori/Shinken Yellow (2013)
- Saitama Kazoku (2013)
- Live (2014)
- Kagekiha Opera (Extreme Opera) as Takemi Kudo (2016)
- Junpei, Think Again (2018)
- Kishiryu Sentai Ryusoulger The Movie: Time Slip! Dinosaur Panic!! as Museum Guide (2019)

=== Video games ===
- The 13th Month as The Princess (2022)

== Works ==
=== Photo albums ===
- Happy desuu!! (Saibunkan Publishing, December 2007) ISBN 978-4-7756-0274-4
- Hannari Suzuka (Wani Books, October 2009) ISBN 978-4-8470-4203-4
- Su-chan no Lovely Life (July 2010) ISBN 978-4-575-30243-1
- Natural 18 (Gakken Publishing, December 2010) ISBN 978-4-05-404745-7

=== DVDs ===
- Suu-chan to Natsuyasumi (Wani Books, September 2007)
- Happy desuu!! (Saibunkan Publishing, January 2008)
- Mabushi! (Line Communications, April 2008)
- Pure Smile Suzuka Morita (Takeshobo, August 2008)
- Suzuka Morita: Morita no Natsu Monogatari (E-Net Frontier, November 2008)
- Amakuchi Suzuka (Aqua House, March 2009)
- Angelica (Toei Video, July 2009)
- Okibariyasuu (Wani Books, December 2009)
- Driving Suzuka!!! (Takeshobo, May 2010)
- Hana no Shima kara (Line Communications, September 2010)
- Romance18 (Gakken, December 2010)
- Heartfulday (Shinyusha Co., April 2011)
- Tenshi no Kiss (E-Net Frontier, July 2011)
- Summer Color (I-One, October 2014)
- Yume Koi Utsutsu (I-One, July 2015)
- Omoide Horohoro (E-Net Frontier, December 2015)

=== Stage plays ===
- Story Girl (Onnanoko)] (April 30 - May 8, 2011)
- Peace Maker (June 3–12, 2011)
- MOTHER ~ tokkō no haha tori hama tome monogatari ~ (Dec 11-15, 2013)
- Lonely Heart Atom (Feb 5-9, 2014)
- Satoru mo no okite! as Kaoru (May 28 - June 1, 2014)
- Good Morning Ice Person (July 24–27, 2014)
- Kekkon no hensachi II DEAD OR ALIVE (September 10–23, 2014)
- Wedding Dress 2015 (March 5–15, 2015)
- Kuchiduke (October 7–18, 2015)
- TARO URASHIMA (August 11–15, 2016)
- Shin Royal (April 27 - May 14, 2017)
- Digimon Adventure Tri. (August 5–13, 2017)
