= Masashi Goda =

Japanese actor

- Born: Hadano, Kanagawa Prefecture, Japan
- Occupations: Actor and singer
- Years active: 1995–present

Masashi Goda (合田 雅吏, Gōda Masashi) is a Japanese actor from Kanagawa Prefecture. He is best known for his portrayal of Yuuji Mita/OHBlue in Chōriki Sentai Ohranger. In 2009, he joined the cast of Samurai Sentai Shinkenger in the recurring role of Shiba Retsudō, the first Shinken Red.

== Filmography ==
=== Television ===
- Chouriki Sentai Ohranger (1995- 1996)as Yuji Mita/ OhBlue
- Doremisora (2002)
- Mito Kōmon (2003–2010), Kaku-san
- Bewitched in Tokyo (2004), Kaku-san
- AIBOU (2012), Hijikata

=== Films ===
- Samurai Sentai Shinkenger the Movie: The Fateful War (2009), Shiba Retsudō
- Ninomiya Kinjirō (2018), Ninomiya Kinjirō
