= Samurai Sentai Shinkenger the Movie: The Fateful War =

- Film poster for both Kamen Rider Decade: All Riders vs. Dai-Shocker and Samurai Sentai Shinkenger The Movie: The Fateful War

Japanese name
- Kanji: 侍戦隊シンケンジャー 銀幕版 天下分け目の戦
Transcriptions
- Revised Hepburn: Samurai Sentai Shinkenjā Ginmakuban Tenkawakeme no Tatakai
- Directed by: Shōjirō Nakazawa
- Written by: Yasuko Kobayashi
- Based on: Samurai Sentai Shinkenger by Yasuko Kobayashi
- Starring: Tori Matsuzaka; Hiroki Aiba; Rin Takanashi; Shogo Suzuki; Suzuka Morita; Keisuke Sohma
- Cinematography: Fumio Matsumura
- Edited by: Ren Sato
- Music by: Hiroshi Takagi
- Distributed by: Saburo Yatsude; Toei Co. Ltd
- Release date: August 8, 2009
- Running time: 20 minutes
- Country: Japan
- Language: Japanese

Samurai Sentai Shinkenger the Movie: The Fateful War (侍戦隊シンケンジャー 銀幕版 天下分け目の戦, Samurai Sentai Shinkenjā Ginmakuban Tenkawakeme no Tatakai) is the film adaptation of the 2009 Super Sentai Series Samurai Sentai Shinkenger. The film was released in Japanese theaters on August 8, 2009, as a double-bill with the Kamen Rider Decade film Kamen Rider Decade: All Riders vs. Dai-Shocker. Some of its footage was used in the Power Rangers Samurai team up episode "Clash of the Red Rangers - The Movie".

== Plot ==
Taking place in between Shinkenger Acts 24 and 25, the Shinkengers battle the newly revived Kusare Gedoushu Aburame Manpuku and his army for three days. The wounded and tired Shinkengers nearly lose, had the Kusare Gedoushu not needed to regain energy by soaking in the Sanzu River. As their wounds are treated, Jii reveals that he has found the Secret Disk used by the first Shinken Red to seal Manpuku at the Genryu Temple, which lies in the middle of Kusare Gedoushu territory. Using Ryunosuke and Kotoha's plan to sneak in disguised as members of the Nanashi Company, Takeru gets the Founding Secret Disk only to see that it is actually a cryptic message left by the first Shinken Red Shiba Retsudō of obtaining power when facing it. Unable to decipher the riddle, the Shinkengers lose hope until they overhear children praying and decide to face the Kusare Gedoushu without the Disk. The next day, the Shinkengers confront the Kusare Gedoushu once more. The vassals hold off the Kusare Nanashi Company members as Shinken Red battles Manpuku. Elsewhere, not wanting his quarry to die by another's hand, Juzo attempts to join the fray as Genta intervenes and becomes Shinken Gold to fight Juzo. Losing to Manpuku, Shinken Red realizes the meaning behind Retsudō's message as he uses the Secret Disk to break the seal Retsudō placed on Manpuku's body to restore the Disk's full power. This turns it into the Dinosaur Disk and turns Shinken Red into Hyper Shinken Red, and his Shinkenmaru into the Kyoryumaru. With these newfound powers, Hyper Shinken Red single-handedly defeats the Kusare Nanashi before slaying Manpuku. Reviving into giant size, Manpuku opens up into his true form however, the Kyoryumaru transforms into the Kyoryu Origami and bites off the Kusare Gedoshu's snake head before combining with ShinkenOh to form Kyoryu ShinkenOh to destroy Manpuku once and for all.

== Cast ==
- Takeru Shiba: Tori Matsuzaka (松坂 桃李, Matsuzaka Tōri)
- Ryunosuke Ikenami: Hiroki Aiba (相葉 弘樹, Aiba Hiroki)
- Mako Shiraishi: Rin Takanashi (高梨 臨, Takanashi Rin)
- Chiaki Tani: Shogo Suzuki (鈴木 勝吾, Suzuki Shōgo)
- Kotoha Hanaori: Suzuka Morita (森田 涼花, Morita Suzuka)
- Genta Umemori: Keisuke Sohma (相馬 圭祐, Sōma Keisuke)
- Juzo Fuwa: Mitsuru Karahashi (唐橋 充, Karahashi Mitsuru)
- Hikoma Kusakabe: Gorou Ibuki (伊吹 吾郎, Ibuki Gorō)
- Shiba Retsudō: Masashi Goda (合田 雅吏, Gōda Masashi)
- Older sister: Rina Matsumoto (松本 梨菜, Matsumoto Rina)
- Younger brother: Amon Kabe (加部 亜門, Kabe Amon)
- Manpuku Aburame (Voice): Shinya Owada (大和田 伸也, Ōwada Shin'ya)
- Doukoku Chimatsuri (Voice): Rintaro Nishi (西 凛太朗, Nishi Rintarō)
- Tayu Usukawa (Voice): Romi Park (朴 璐美, Paku Romi)
- Shitari of the Bones (Voice): Chō (チョー)
- Narration, Sushi Changer Voice: Hironori Miyata (宮田 浩徳, Miyata Hironori)

=== Cast notes ===
Masashi Goda, previously Yūji Mita/OhBlue in Chouriki Sentai Ohranger, was brought onto the film to portray Shiba Retsudō (志葉 烈堂, Shiba Retsudō), the first Shinken Red (初代シンケンレッド, Shodai Shinken Reddo). Veteran jidaigeki actor Shinya Owada was brought onto the project to portray the evil leader of the Kusare Gedoushu (クサレ外道衆, Kusare Gedōshū; translated as "Rotten Heretic Party"), Manpuku Aburame (脂目 マンプク, Aburame Manpuku).

== Songs ==
Ending theme

- "Shirokujimuchū Shinkenger ~Ginmakuban~" (四六時夢中 シンケンジャー～銀幕版～, Shirokujimuchū Shinkenjā ~Ginmakuban~; "Dreaming 24/7, Shinkenger (Movie Version)")
  - Lyrics: Shoko Fujibayashi
  - Composition: Hideaki Takatori
  - Arrangement: Project.R (Hiroaki Kagoshima)
  - Artist: Shinkengers (Tori Matsuzaka, Hiroki Aiba, Rin Takanashi, Shogo Suzuki, Suzuka Morita, Keisuke Sohma) & Hideaki Takatori
