= Shogo Suzuki (actor, born 1989) =

Japanese actor and musician (born 1989)

Shōgo Suzuki
- 鈴木 勝吾
- Born: February 4, 1989 (age 37); Odawara, Kanagawa, Japan
- Occupation: Actor
- Years active: 2009–present
- Height: 1.72 m (5 ft 8 in)
- Website: http://www.hirata-office.jp/talent_profile/men/shogo_suzuki.html

Shōgo Suzuki (鈴木 勝吾, Suzuki Shōgo; born February 4, 1989) is a Japanese actor and musician from Odawara, Kanagawa. He is best known for his role in the 2009 Super Sentai series Samurai Sentai Shinkenger as Chiaki Tani/Shinken Green. He was the lead guitarist for the rock group Cocoa Otoko, and is represented by the Japanese agency Hirata Office.

== Filmography ==
=== Television ===
- Samurai Sentai Shinkenger as Tani Chiaki/Shinken Green (2009–2010)
- Kamen Rider Decade as Chiaki Tani/Shinken Green (2009, ep-24-25)
- Dosokai as Kōta (2010)
- Heaven's Rock as Ryuichi (2010)
- Kodai Shōjotai Dogoon V as Shōta Tsukimiya (2010)
- Crystal as Katsumi Oshima (2011)
- Accomplishment of Fudanshi Bartender as Iwai (2022)

=== Movies ===
- Samurai Sentai Shinkenger The Movie: The Fateful War - Chiaki Tani/Shinken Green (2009)
- Samurai Sentai Shinkenger vs. Go-onger: GinmakuBang!! - Chiaki Tani/Shinken Green (2010)
- Come Back! Samurai Sentai Shinkenger - Chiaki Tani/Shinken Green (2010)
- Tensou Sentai Goseiger vs. Shinkenger: Epic on Ginmaku - Chiaki Tani/Shinken Green (2011)
- BADBOYS - Tsukasa Kiriki (2011)
- Gokaiger Goseiger Super Sentai 199 Hero Great Battle - Chiaki Tani (2011)
- Gal Basara: Sengoku Jidai wa Kengai Desu - Rikichi (2011)
- Kamen Rider Saber + Kikai Sentai Zenkaiger: Super Hero Senki - Chiaki Tani/Shinken Green (2021)
- Bakumatsu Without Honor And Humanity - Date Tadaoshin (2023)

=== Stage play ===
- Musical "Hakuoki" - Kazama Chikage
  - Saito version (2012)
  - Okita Souji version (2013)
  - Hijikata Toshizo version (2013)
  - HAKU-MYU LIVE (2014)
  - Kazama Chikage version (2014)
  - Todo Heisuke version (2015)
  - HAKU-MYU LIVE 2 (2016))
  - Shinkai Kazue Souma version (2021)
  - Shinkai Saitou Hajime version (2022)
- Stage play "Tokyo Ghoul" (2015) - Nishio Nishiki
- Stage play "Tokyo Ghoul" (2017) - Nishio Nishiki
- Musical "Moriarty the Patriot" (2019) - William James Moriarty
- Musical "Moriarty the Patriot" Op.2: A Scandal In British Empire (2020) - William James Moriarty
- Musical "Moriarty the Patriot" Op.3: The Phantom Of Whitechapel (2021) - William James Moriarty
- Musical "Moriarty the Patriot" Op.4: The Two Criminals (2023) - William James Moriarty
- Musical "Moriarty the Patriot" Op.5: The Final Problem (2023) - William James Moriarty
- Musical "Moriarty the Patriot" Op.2: A Scandal In British Empire -Reprise- (2025) - William James Moriarty
- Musical "Moriarty the Patriot" Op.1: A Study In Scarlet -Reprise- (2026) - William James Moriarty
- Fullmetal Alchemist The Stage (2023) - Solf J. Kimblee and Ridel LeCoulte
- Bakumatsu Without Honor And Humanity (2023) - Date Tadaoshin
- Eternal Ghost Fish (2023)
- Musical "Tokyo Revengers #2 Bloody Halloween" (2025) - Keisuke Baji
