= Natsuyo Ishinoda =

Japanese singer-songwriter (born 1980)

- Born: 石野田 奈津代; April 28, 1980 (age 46); Kōzushima, Tokyo, Japan
- Genres: pop
- Occupation: Singer-songwriter
- Instruments: Vocals, guitar
- Years active: 1999–present
- Labels: Sony Music, Songlife, Milestone Crowds, BounDee
- Website: www.ishinoda.com

Natsuyo Ishinoda (石野田 奈津代, Ishinoda Natsuyo; born April 28, 1980), is a Japanese singer-songwriter from Kōzu-shima in the Izu Islands in Tokyo. She released her debut album Himawari in 1999. Her 2009 single "Haru Sora" is her most successful single, reaching number 39 on Oricon's singles charts.

== Biography ==
Ishinoda was born on Kōzu-shima in 1980. When she was 10, she first wanted to become a singer. She moved to mainland Tokyo for high school in 1996, and bought her first guitar. In 1997 and 1998, she created demos and busked on the streets of Tokyo, mostly performing in Yotsuya and Kichijōji.

In 1999 she released her debut album under Sony Music Japan, Himawari, and performed her first solo live on July 24, 1999. For her career with Sony, her name was spelt in hiragana (いしのだなつよ). She became a radio personality for All night Nippon R in 1999. After releasing four singles, she parted with Sony in 2000.

In the early 2000s, she formed a band called Kicca, with 100s members Masahiro Machida, Hiroo Yamaguchi and Tomu Tamada, and released the extended plays Tokyo Straw and Tokyo Straw 2 in 2003 and 2004 respectively. In 2005, she decided to change her stage name to kanji (石野田奈津代), and created her own independent music label, Songlife. On Songlife, she released her second studio album, Watashi no Uta. Her independently released single "Clover" was her first release to chart on Oricon's singles chart, peaking at number 182.

In 2009, she debuted for the second time under a major label, Universal Music Japan, with the single "Haru Sora," which was featured on the Nippon TV television show Dare mo Shiranai Nakeru Uta.

Ishinoda works as a tourism ambassador for Uken Island in Kagoshima, as well as a celebrity train conductor for the Izu Kyūkō Line on the Izu Peninsula.

== Songwriting ==
Ishinoda wrote two songs for the serialised drama Haruchan: "Wakiwaki My Friend" (ワキワキマイフレンド) which was released as a single by Hiromi Go in 2001, and "Irozuku Tabiji" (色づく旅路) performed by Yōko Nagayama.

== Discography ==
=== Studio albums ===
- Himawari (ひまわり; "Sunflower") (1999)
- Watashi no Uta (わたしのうた; "My Song") (2007)
- Kimi no Uta (きみのうた; "Your Song") (2008)
- Rokujū-oku no Namida (60億の涙; "Six Billion Tears") (2009)
- Sakura (さくら; "Cherry Blossoms") (2010) (self-cover album)
- Star Olympia 302 (スターオリンピア302) (2013)
- Star Olympia 302 2 (スターオリンピア302②) (2013)
- Star Olympia 302 3 (スターオリンピア302③) (2013)

=== Concept albums ===
- Kirakira (キラキラ☆; "Sparkle") (2006)
- Umi (うみ; "Sea") (2006)
- Love+ (2006)

=== Extended plays ===
- Tokyo Straw (トーキョー・ストロー) (2003) (as "Kicca")
- Tokyo Straw 2 (トーキョー・ストロー) (2004) (as "Kicca")

=== Singles ===
- "Ittōsei" (1等星; "First Magnitude Star") (1999)
- "Himawari" (ひまわり) (1999)
- "Ondo" (温度; "Temperature") (2000)
- "Sandglass" (2000)
- "Haru Sora" (春空 -ハルソラ-; "Spring Sky") (2008)
- "Clover" (クローバー) (2008)
- "Eien" (永遠; "Forever") (2009)
- "Hananari" (はななり) (2010)
