= Bajō-zutsu =

Japanese firearm

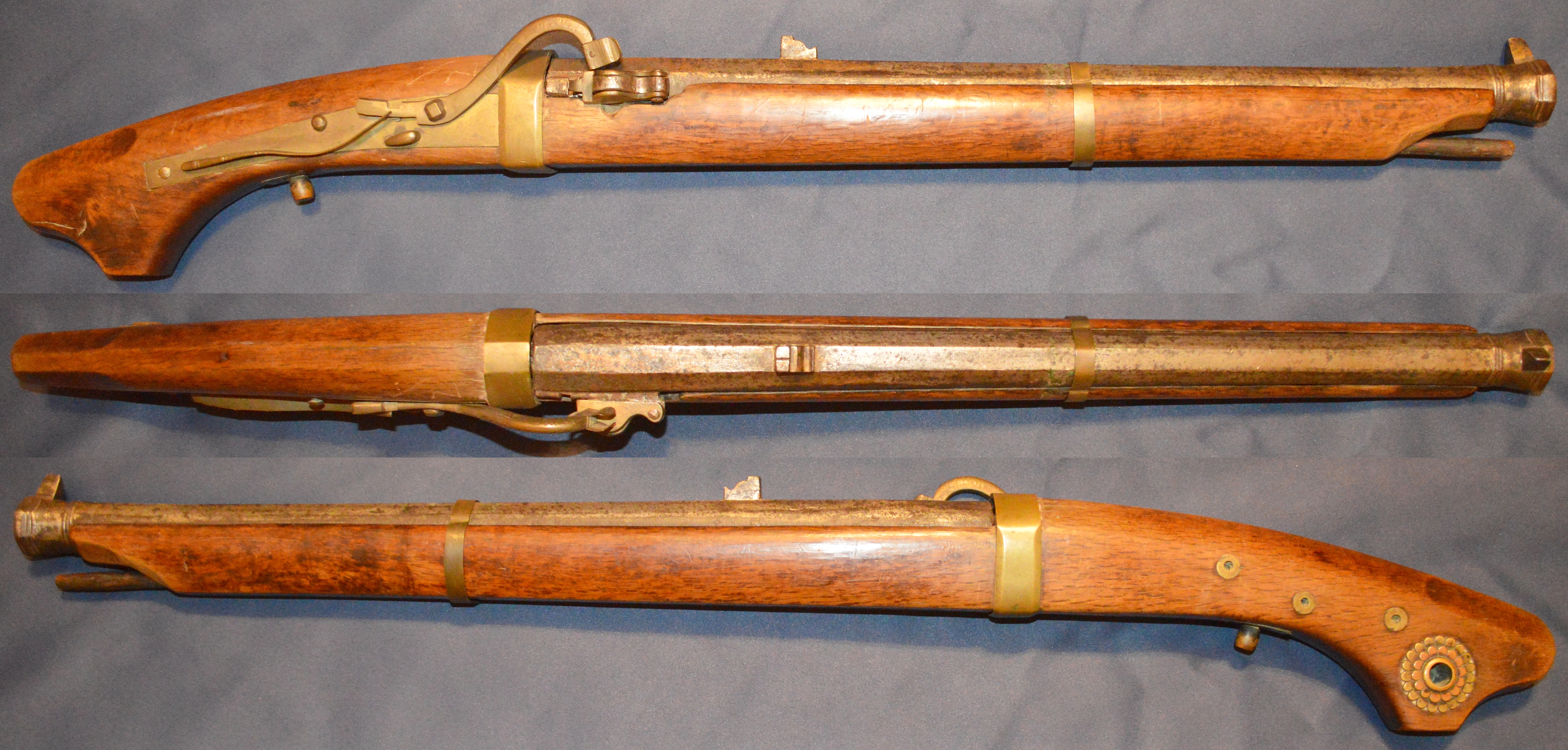
Bajōzutsu

The bajō-zutsu (馬上筒; literally "horseback(-riding) barrel") was a tanegashima in the form of a pistol. Bajō-zutsu were used by mounted samurai in feudal Japan.
