= Goro Ibuki =

Japanese actor (born 1946)

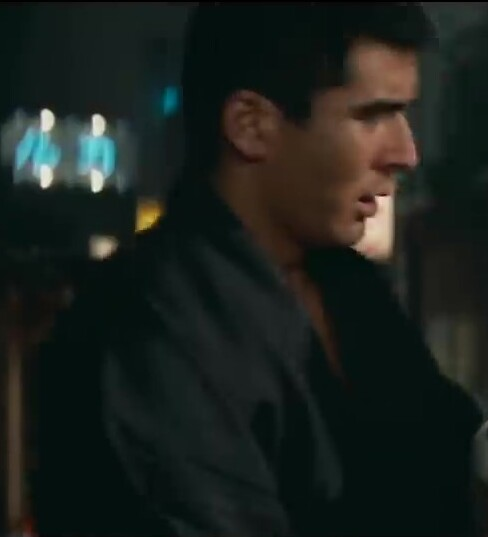

Goro Ibuki (伊吹 吾郎, Ibuki Gorō; born January 2, 1946) is a Japanese actor. He is known for his parts in jidaigeki television dramas, especially Kakusan in the Mito Kōmon series. He appeared in Samurai Sentai Shinkenger as Hikoma Kusakabe.

== Filmography ==
=== Film ===
- Bohachi Bushido: Code of the Forgotten Eight (1973)
- Bohachi Bushido Saburai (1974) - Kyushi Issho (Main role)
- Battles Without Honor and Humanity (1973)
- Battles Without Honor and Humanity: Final Episode (1974)
- The Homeless (1974)
- Hokuriku Proxy War (1977)
- Nichiren (1979)
- The Magic Hour (2008)
- Samurai Sentai Shinkenger The Movie: The Fateful War - Hikoma Kusakabe (2009)
- Samurai Sentai Shinkenger vs. Go-onger: GinmakuBang!! - Hikoma Kusakabe (2010)
- Tensou Sentai Goseiger vs. Shinkenger: Epic on Ginmaku - Hikoma Kusakabe (2011)
- Strawberry Night (2013)
- The Mole Song: Undercover Agent Reiji (2013)
- The Blood of Wolves - Kenji Odani (2018)

=== Television ===
- Shin Heike Monogatari (1972) - Hachirō Tametomo
- Kunitori Monogatari - Hosokawa Fujitaka (1973)
- Unmeitōge - Yagyū Jūbei Mitsuyoshi (1974)
- Kusa Moeru - Wada Yoshimori (1979)
- Hissatsu Shigotonin (1979-1981) - Samon
- Tokugawa Ieyasu (1983) - Katō Kiyomasa
- Mito Kōmon - Kakusan (1983-2000)
- Samurai Sentai Shinkenger - Hikoma Kusakabe (2009–10)
- Kamen Rider Decade - Hikoma Kusakabe (Guest star) (2009)
- Tenchijin - Hōjō Ujimasa (2009)
- Yae's Sakura - Tokugawa Nariaki (2013)
- Gunshi Kanbei - Hōjō Ujimasa (2014)
- Nobunaga Moyu - Shibata Katsuie (2016)
- Kirin ga Kuru - Taigen Sessai (2020)
