= Hironori Miyata =

Japanese voice actor (born 1960)

- Born: June 22, 1960 (age 66); Kōchi Prefecture, Japan
- Occupation: Voice actor
- Years active: 1986–present

Hironori Miyata (宮田 浩徳, Miyata Hironori; born June 22, 1960) is a Japanese voice actor from Kōchi Prefecture, who is currently affiliated with Arts Vision. He is best known for his roles in Chiisai Kojin Microman (as Gunbody) and The Legend of Zelda: Twilight Princess (as Ganondorf).

== Filmography ==
=== Television animation ===
- Argento Soma (xxxx) (Yōin Kyōiku)
- Chiisai Kojin Microman (xxxx) (Gunbody)
- Jungle King Tar-chan (xxxx) (Hunter)
- Makai Senki Disgaea (xxxx) (Vulcanus)
- Scrapped Princess (xxxx) (Roy)
- SD Gundam Sangokuden Brave Battle Warriors (xxxx) (Ryuuhyou Gundam)
- Shōnen Ashipe (xxxx) (Mao's Papa)
- Witch Hunter Robin (2002) (Ikeuchi)
- Dark Gathering (2023) (High Priest of the Evil Sutra)

=== OVA ===
- Konpeki no Kantai (xxxx) (Shōri Nihonyanagi)
- Legend of the Galactic Heroes (xxxx) (Disshu/Ottotēru)

=== Web animation ===
- Bakumatsu Kikansetsu Irohanihoheto (xxxx) (Peddler)

=== Tokusatsu ===
- Gosei Sentai Dairanger (1993) (Narration)
- Gekisou Sentai Carranger (1996) (Zoku Green (ep. 25))
- Denji Sentai Megaranger (1997) (Dokuga Nejire (ep. 16))
- Seijuu Sentai Gingaman (1998) (Kemuemon (ep. 15))
- Hyakujuu Sentai Gaoranger (2001) (Magic Flute Org (ep. 36))
- Ninpuu Sentai Hurricanger (2002) (Karaku Warrior Furaimaru, Narration)
- Bakuryuu Sentai Abaranger (2003) (Tsuribakatsuoribu (ep. 26))
- Samurai Sentai Shinkenger (2009) (Secret Analysis Case Inromaru Voice (ep. 24 - 49) Narration)
- Kaizoku Sentai Gokaiger (2011) (Furaimaru (eps. 25 - 50))
- Ninpuu Sentai Hurricanger 10 Years After (2013) (Zeroth Lance Bat Ze Runba, Narration)

=== Video games ===
- Disgaea: Hour of Darkness (Vulcanus)
- Flash Hiders (xxxx) (Dairufa)
- La Pucelle: Tactics (xxxx) (Elmesu)
- Donkey Kong: Jungle Beat (xxxx) (Karate Kong)
- The Legend of Zelda: The Wind Waker (xxxx) (Tingle)
- The Legend of Zelda: Twilight Princess (xxxx) (Ganondorf)
- Phantom Brave (xxxx) (Cauldron)
- Super Smash Bros. Brawl (xxxx) (Ganondorf, Tingle)
- Super Smash Bros. for Nintendo 3DS and Wii U (xxxx) (Ganondorf, Tingle)

=== Dubbing ===
- Anthropoid (Uncle Hajský (Toby Jones))
- The Mule (DEA Regional Manager (Pete Burris))
- Vigil (Colin Robertson (Gary Lewis))
