= Mojo =

Mojo may refer to:

- Mojo bag, a magical charm bag used in the African American Hoodoo tradition

== Arts, entertainment and media ==
=== Film and television ===
- Mojo (2017 film), a 2017 Indian Kannada drama film written and directed by Sreesha Belakvaadi
- Mojo (play), a 1995 play by English playwright Jez Butterworth
  - Mojo (1997 film) based on the play, directed by Butterworth
- Mojo HD, an American television network
- Mojo Jojo, the main villain in The Powerpuff Girls series

=== Games ===
- Mojo (board game)
- Mojo!, a 2003 video game
- Mojo (microconsole), an Android video game console by Mad Catz
- Mojo Rules System (RPG), created by Polymancer magazine
- Mojo, a character in Chrono Cross

=== Literature ===
- Mojo (comics), a Marvel Comics villain
- Mojo (magazine), a British music magazine
- Mother Jones (magazine) (MoJo)
- Mojo: Conjure Stories, an anthology edited by Nalo Hopkinson

=== Radio stations ===
- Mojo Radio (WPLJ), a New York City, US radio station
- Mojo Radio (CFMJ), a Toronto, Ontario, Canada radio station

=== Music ===
==== Artists ====
- The Mojos, a 1960s British beat group
- The Mojo Men, a 1960s American rock band

==== Companies ====
- Mojo Records, a 1990s California record label
- Mojo Records (UK), a record label
- Mojo Concerts, a Dutch subsidiary of Live Nation Entertainment

==== Recordings ====
- Mojo (Tom Petty and the Heartbreakers album), 2010
- Mojo (Ash Grunwald album), 2019
- "Mojo", a 2012 song by -M- from Îl
- "Mojo", a 2006 song by Peeping Tom from Peeping Tom
- "Mojo pin", a song by Jeff Buckley from his 1994 album Grace

=== Sculptures ===
- Mojo (Moeller), a 2008 sculpture

== Businesses and organizations ==
- Mojo (advertising), an Australian advertising agency
- Mojo Club, in Hamburg, Germany
- Mojo Press, a publisher
- Mississippi Mojo, a US bandy club
- MoJo Story, an Indian digital news channel founded by Barkha Dutt
- Mojo Energy Pouches, caffeine pouches created by a subsidiary of Swisher

== Food ==
- Mojo (confectionery), a sweet manufactured and sold in the UK
- Mojo (sauce), a group of sauces from the Canary Islands
- Mojo (soft drink), a cola flavor soft drink manufactured and sold in the Bangladesh

== People with the name ==
=== Given name ===
- Mojo Nixon (born 1957), American musician
- Mojo Mathers (born 1966), New Zealand Member of Parliament

=== Nickname ===
- George "Mojo" Buford (1929–2011), American blues harmonica player
- Mo Johnston (born 1963), or MoJo, footballer
- MoJo (born 1952), Japanese vocalist
- Maurice Jones-Drew (born 1985), or MoJo, NFL running back
- Matt Morginsky (born 1976), or Mojo, former lead singer of The O.C. Supertones
- Mojo Rawley, American wrestler
- Mojo, singer, musician, songwriter and leader of Mojo & The Bayou Gypsies, a zydeco and Cajun music band

== Places ==
- Mojo, Ethiopia, a railway town near Addis Ababa
- Mojo, an island a few miles west of Mount Tambora, Indonesia
- MOJO (M20, Junction 10a), the original name of the Customs clearance facility near Sevington, Kent, England

== Science, technology ==
- Mahindra Mojo, a motorcycle
- Mojo (mammal), a genus of extinct rodent-like animal
- Mojo (mobile journalist), a journalist in the field who sends stories electronically
- Mojo (programming language)

== Other uses ==
- Mojo people, an indigenous people of Bolivia
- Mojo languages, spoken in Bolivia
- Mortimer Jordan High School, or MoJo, in Morris, Alabama
- San Diego Mojo, a professional volleyball team

== See also ==
- Box Office Mojo, a motion picture related website
- Modjo, a French dance music duo
- Moxo (disambiguation)
- Moio (disambiguation)
- Moyo (disambiguation)
