= Moyo =

Moyo may refer to:

== Geography ==
- Moyo Island, Indonesia
- Moyo River, Sumbawa, Indonesia
- Moyo District, Uganda
- Moyo Town, Uganda

== Athletes with the surname Moyo ==
- Blessing Moyo (born 1992), Zimbabwean footballer
- Bright Vanya Moyo, Zimbabwean footballer
- Cliff Moyo (born 1993), retired Zimbabwean footballer
- Clive Moyo-Modise, retired English footballer
- David Moyo (born 1994), Zimbabwean-English footballer
- Gift Moyo, Botswana footballer
- Godfrey Moyo, retired Zimbabwean footballer
- Henry Moyo (athlete) (born 1972), Malawian Olympic long-distance runner
- Henry Moyo (football) (1946–2012), Malawian footballer, coach, and manager
- Honest Moyo (born 1991), Zimbabwean Bulawayoan footballer
- Kelvin Moyo (born 1993), Zimbabwean footballer
- Mtshumayeli Moyo (born 1983), retired Zimbabwean footballer
- Nomsa Moyo, Zimbabwean footballer
- Obert Moyo, retired Zimbabwean footballer
- Peter Moyo (born 1988), Zimbabwean footballer
- Samukeliso Moyo (born 1974), Zimbabwean long-distance runner
- Yven Moyo (born 1992), French-Congolese footballer

== Actors and musicians with surname Moyo ==
- Alois Moyo (born 1966), Zimbabwean-German actor
- Ashleigh Angel Moyo (born 2000), Zimbabwean musician known as Shashl
- Eric Moyo (born 1982), Zimbabwean singer
- Krishna Moyo (1919-?), Indian actor, comedian, singer/songwriter, and playwright
- Tamy Moyo (born 1998), Zimbabwean musician and actress
- Tongai Moyo (1968–2011), Zimbabwean musician

== Politicians with the surname Moyo ==
- Canaan Zinothi Moyo (1932-2017), Zimbabwean politician
- Desire Moyo (1979–2025), Zimbabwean politician
- Faless Debrah Moyo, Malawian politician
- Gorden Moyo, Zimbabwean politician
- Headman Moyo, Zimbabwean politician
- Jonathan Moyo (born 1957), Zimbabwean politician
- July Moyo (born 1950), Zimbabwean politician
- Lovemore Moyo (born 1965), Zimbabwean politician
- Martin Moyo (born 1952), Zimbabwean politician
- Moses Moyo (born 1976), Zambian politician
- Obadiah Moyo, Zimbabwean politician
- Richard Moyo, Zimbabwean politician
- Seiso Moyo (1956–2012), Zimbabwean politician
- Sibusiso Moyo (1961-2021), Zimbabwean politician and general
- Simon Khaya Moyo (1945-2021), Zimbabwean politician and diplomat
- Torerayi Moyo, Zimbabwean politician

== Other persons with the surname Moyo ==
- Austin Moyo (1957-2018), Zimbabwean soldier and intelligence officer
- Dambisa Moyo, Baroness Moyo (born 1969), Zambian economist and author
- Elson Moyo, once deputy commander of the Air Force of Zimbabwe
- Fulata Moyo, Malawian feminist theologian
- Jason Moyo (1927–1977), Zimbabwean revolutionary
- Mavis Moyo (born 1929), Zimbabwean broadcaster
- Moses ka Moyo (1977-2018), journalist and activist in South Africa
- Sam Moyo (1954-2015), Zimbabwean scholar and land reformer
- Sikhulile Moyo, Zimbabwean virologist
- Sipho Moyo, Zimbabwean economist
- Tendai Moyo, Zimbabwean-British entrepreneur
- Zwelibanzi Moyo Williams (born 1977), Zimbabwean-American chef

== Persons with the nickname Moyo ==
- Mohammad Yousuf (cricketer, born 1974) (born 1974), Pakistani cricketer
- Big Moe (1974–2007), American rapper, nicknamed MoYo

== Other uses ==
- Jason Ziyaphapha Moyo Air Force Base in Zimbabwe, abbreviated "JZ Moyo"
- Kikagaku Moyo, a Japanese psychedelic rock band active from 2012 to 2022
- Moyo Makadi, a recurring character in the Belgian series wtFOCK.

== Terms and meanings in other languages ==
- Mojo (African American culture) (or moyo), an early 20th-century African-American term meaning a magic charm or talisman
- Moyo drum, a type of steel tongue drum
- Moyo (Go), a term in the board game Go

== See also ==
- Moio (disambiguation)
