= John Bailey (cinematographer) =

American cinematographer and film director (1942–2023)

- Born: John Ira Bailey; August 10, 1942; Moberly, Missouri, U.S.
- Died: November 10, 2023 (aged 81); Los Angeles, California, U.S.
- Education: Loyola University (Loyola Marymount University); USC School of Cinematic Arts
- Occupations: Cinematographer, film director
- Years active: 1968–2022
- Spouse: Carol Littleton (m. 1972)

President of the Academy of Motion Picture Arts and Sciences
- In office August 8, 2017 – August 7, 2019
- Preceded by: Cheryl Boone Isaacs
- Succeeded by: David Rubin

John Ira Bailey ASC (August 10, 1942 – November 10, 2023) was an American cinematographer, film director, and former president of the Academy of Motion Picture Arts and Sciences.

== Early life ==
John Ira Bailey was born August 10, 1942, in Moberly, Missouri, and raised in Norwalk, California. He attended Pius X High School in Downey, California, and briefly studied chemistry at Santa Clara University before transferring to Loyola University, Los Angeles, where he graduated with a bachelor's degree in 1964. He earned a graduate degree from the University of Southern California School of Cinematic Arts (SCA) in 1968.

== Career ==
Bailey spent 11 years apprenticing as a crew member with cinematographers such as Vilmos Zsigmond and Néstor Almendros, working on Two-Lane Blacktop, The Late Show, 3 Women, Winter Kills, and Days of Heaven. He earned his first credit as director of photography for Boulevard Nights, followed by Ordinary People and American Gigolo.

In 1985, Bailey shared the Cannes Film Festival Best Artistic Contribution Award with Eiko Ishioka and Philip Glass for Mishima: A Life in Four Chapters. He was nominated for the Independent Spirit Award for Best Cinematography for Tough Guys Don't Dance and the Camerimage Golden Frog Award for Best Cinematography for Forever Mine. He was a member of the American Society of Cinematographers and member of the jury at the Venice Film Festival in 1987. He worked on numerous comedy films such as Groundhog Day, As Good as It Gets, and The Producers. He was a veteran documentary cameraman.

Bailey's credits as a director include The Search for Signs of Intelligent Life in the Universe, China Moon, Mariette in Ecstasy, and Via Dolorosa.

== Personal life and death ==
Bailey was married to film editor Carol Littleton from 1972. They resided in Los Angeles. He died in his sleep on November 10, 2023, at the age of 81.

== Filmography ==
=== Cinematographer ===
Film

Year	Title	Director	Notes
1972	Premonition	Alan Rudolph	
1974	End of August	Gary Young	
1975	Legacy	Karen Arthur	
1978	The Mafu Cage	Karen Arthur	
1979	Boulevard Nights	Michael Pressman	
1980	American Gigolo	Paul Schrader	
1980	Ordinary People	Robert Redford	
1981	Honky Tonk Freeway	John Schlesinger	
1981	Continental Divide	Michael Apted	
1982	Cat People	Paul Schrader	
1982	That Championship Season	Jason Miller	
1983	Without a Trace	Stanley R. Jaffe	
1983	The Big Chill	Lawrence Kasdan	
1984	Racing with the Moon	Richard Benjamin	
1984	The Pope of Greenwich Village	Stuart Rosenberg	
1985	Mishima: A Life in Four Chapters	Paul Schrader	
1985	Silverado	Lawrence Kasdan	
1986	Crossroads	Walter Hill	
1986	Brighton Beach Memoirs	Gene Saks	
1987	Light of Day	Paul Schrader	
1987	Tough Guys Don't Dance	Norman Mailer	Uncredited
1988	Vibes	Ken Kwapis	
1988	The Accidental Tourist	Lawrence Kasdan	
1990	My Blue Heaven	Herbert Ross	
1991	The Search for Signs of Intelligent Life in the Universe	Himself	
1993	Groundhog Day	Harold Ramis	
1993	In the Line of Fire	Wolfgang Petersen	
1994	Nobody's Fool	Robert Benton	
1996	Extreme Measures	Michael Apted	
1997	As Good as It Gets	James L. Brooks	
1998	Living Out Loud	Richard LaGravenese	
1999	The Out-of-Towners	Sam Weisman	
1999	Forever Mine	Paul Schrader	
1999	For Love of the Game	Sam Raimi	
2000	Via Dolorosa	Himself	
2001	Antitrust	Peter Howitt	
2001	The Anniversary Party	Jennifer Jason Leigh; Alan Cumming	
2002	Divine Secrets of the Ya-Ya Sisterhood	Callie Khouri	
2003	How to Lose a Guy in 10 Days	Donald Petrie	
2004	Incident at Loch Ness	Zak Penn	Also actor (As "Crew of Herzog in Wonderland")
2005	The Sisterhood of the Traveling Pants	Ken Kwapis	
2005	Must Love Dogs	Gary David Goldberg	
2005	The Producers	Susan Stroman	With Charles Minsky
2006	The Architect	Matthew Tauber	
2007	The Death and Life of Bobby Z	John Herzfeld	Uncredited
2007	License to Wed	Ken Kwapis	
2008	Mad Money	Callie Khouri	
2008	Over Her Dead Body	Jeff Lowell	
2009	The Greatest	Shana Feste	
2009	Brief Interviews with Hideous Men	John Krasinski	
2009	He's Just Not That into You	Ken Kwapis	
2010	When in Rome	Mark Steven Johnson	
2010	Ramona and Beezus	Elizabeth Allen Rosenbaum	
2010	Country Strong	Shana Feste	
2012	Big Miracle	Ken Kwapis	
2013	The Way, Way Back	Nat Faxon; Jim Rash	
2013	A.C.O.D.	Stu Zicherman	
2013	Snake and Mongoose	Wayne Holloway	
2014	The Angriest Man in Brooklyn	Phil Alden Robinson	
2014	The Forger	Philip Martin	
2015	A Walk in the Woods	Ken Kwapis	
2016	Burn Your Maps	Jordan Roberts	
2017	How to Be a Latin Lover	Ken Marino	
2018	An Actor Prepares	Steve Clark	
2019	Phil	Greg Kinnear	
2022	10 Tricks	Richard Pagano	

Short film

Year	Title	Director	Notes
1972	Open Window	Richard Patterson	
2002	The Fig Rig	Shari Roman	Documentary short
2003	ADM: DOP (Anthony Dod Mantle - Director of Photography)	Shari Roman	Documentary short
2009	Looking at Animals	Marc Turtletaub	

TV movies

Year	Title	Director
1978	Battered	Peter Werner
1980	City in Fear	Jud Taylor
1989	Time Flies When You're Alive	Roger Spottiswoode
1996	Passion	James Lapine
1998	Always Outnumbered	Michael Apted

Documentary film

Year	Title	Director	Notes
1987	Swimming to Cambodia	Jonathan Demme	Concert film
1990	Hollywood Mavericks	Florence Dauman; Dale Ann Stieber	With Steve Baum, Frederick Elmes, Marc Gérard, Mead Hunt, Todd McClelland, Peter S. Rosen and Steven Wacks
1991	A Brief History of Time	Errol Morris	With Stefan Czapsky
2000	Michael Jordan to the Max	Don Kempf; James D. Stern	With Joe D'Alessandro, David Kessler, James Neihouse and Rodney Taylor
2001	NSync: Bigger Than Live	Himself	With Matthew Williams
2002	The Kid Stays in the Picture	Nanette Burstein; Brett Morgen	
2003	Digital Babylon	Shari Roman	
2004	The Cutting Edge: The Magic of Movie Editing	Wendy Apple	

=== Director ===
- The Search for Signs of Intelligent Life in the Universe (1991)
- China Moon (1994)
- Via Dolorosa (2000) (stage play)
- NSync: Bigger Than Live (2001) (Documentary film)
- Mariette in Ecstasy (2019)

== Awards and nominations ==
Year	Award	Category	Nominated work	Result	Ref.
1985	Cannes Film Festival	Best Artistic Contribution	Mishima: A Life in Four Chapters	Won	
1988	Independent Spirit Award	Best Cinematography	Tough Guys Don't Dance	Nominated	
1994	CableACE Award	Television Special	The Search for Signs of Intelligent Life in the Universe	Won	
1994	CableACE Award	Directing in a Comedy Special	The Search for Signs of Intelligent Life in the Universe	Nominated	
1999	Camerimage	Golden Frog Award	Forever Mine	Nominated	
2001	Society of Operating Cameramen	President's Award	—N/a	Won	
2015	American Society of Cinematographers	Lifetime Achievement Award	—N/a	Won	
2018	Society of Operating Cameramen	Governor's Award	—N/a	Won	
2019	Camerimage	Lifetime Achievement Award	—N/a	Won	

Non-profit organization positions
Preceded by Cheryl Boone Isaacs	President of the Academy of Motion Picture Arts and Sciences; 2017–2019	Succeeded by David Rubin
