= Moxo =

Moxo may refer to:

- Moxo people, an ethnic group of Bolivia
- Moxo languages, the languages spoken by them
- Francesc de Moxó (1879–1920), Spanish politician and sports leader
- Manuel Córdova-Rios (Ino Moxo), a vegetalista (herbalist) of the upper Amazon
- Rafael Larraín Moxó (1813–1892), Chilean politician, farmer, businessman and banker

== See also ==
- Moxos (disambiguation)
- Moho (disambiguation)
- Mojo (disambiguation)
- Mocho (disambiguation)
