= Kagaku Sentai Dynaman =

Television series

- Title Screen
- Genre: Tokusatsu; Superhero fiction Science fiction Action/Adventure
- Created by: Toei Company
- Developed by: Hirohisa Soda
- Directed by: Shohei Tojo; Minoru Yamada; Takafumi Hattori; Nagafumi Hori
- Starring: Satoshi Okita; Junichi Haruta; Koji Unoki; Yu Tokita; Sayoko Hagiwara; Junshi Shimada; Masashi Ishibashi; Takeki Hayashi; Mari Kouno; Ritsuko Fujimiya
- Narrated by: Tōru Ōhira
- Composer: Kensuke Kyō
- Country of origin: Japan
- No. of episodes: 51

Production
- Producers: Seiji Abe; Moriyoshi Katō; Takeyuki Suzuki; Yasuhiro Tomita
- Running time: 30 minutes
- Production companies: TV Asahi; Toei Company; Toei Advertising

Original release
- Network: ANN (TV Asahi)
- Release: February 5, 1983 – January 28, 1984

Related
- Dai Sentai Goggle-V; Choudenshi Bioman

Kagaku Sentai Dynaman (科学戦隊ダイナマン, Kagaku Sentai Dainaman; Science Squadron Dynaman) is a Japanese television tokusatsu series broadcast by TV Asahi. The series is the seventh installment of Super Sentai. Directed by Shohei Tojo, Minoru Yamada, Takafumi Hattori and Nagafumi Hori, it stars Satoshi Okita, Junichi Haruta, Koji Unoki, Yu Tokita, Sayoko Hagiwara, Junshi Shimada, Masashi Ishibashi, Takeki Hayashi, Mari Kouno and Ritsuko Fujimiya. It aired from February 5, 1983 to January 28, 1984, replacing Dai Sentai Goggle-V and was replaced by Choudenshi Bioman. The international English title is listed by Toei as simply Dynaman.

== Plot ==
The Jashinka Empire rises from the depths of the Earth to conquer the world. To stop them, Dr. Kyutaro Yumeno assembles five inventors to his laboratory, Yumeno Invention Laboratory and gives them the power to become Dynamen. Each member has their own goal, but as the Kagaku Sentai Dynaman, they are united to stop the Jashinka Empire in their tracks.

== Characters ==
=== Dynamen ===
The Dynamen transformed. From left to right: Rei Tachibana, Yosuke Shima, Hokuto Dan, Ryu Hoshikawa, and Kosaku Nango.

The eponymous Dynamen is a Super Sentai team assembled by Kyutaro Yumeno to combat the Janshinka Empire. They are the first team in the franchise to have their costumes made out of spandex as they discontinued the use of capes and scarves, which were part of Super Sentai uniforms from Himitsu Sentai Gorenger to Dai Sentai Goggle-V. Their special team attack is the (New) Super Dynamite ((ニュー) スーパーダイナマイト, (Nyū) Sūpā Dainamaito).

- Hokuto Dan (弾 北斗, Dan Hokuto)/Dyna Red (ダイナレッド, Daina Reddo): A kendō master from Hokkaido. Responsible and headstrong, he lost his mother when he was young and sympathizes with children who also suffered the loss of a parent. The master of all martial arts, he is a rank holder in kendo, karate, judo, and boxing. He is also a champion motorcyclist. As an inventor, Hokuto's dream is to create an engine that does not cause pollution.
- Ryu Hoshikawa (星川 竜, Hoshikawa Ryū)/Dyna Black (ダイナブラック, Daina Burakku): A descendant of Iga ninjas, he is skilled at the art of ninpou and invisibility and he never allows himself to miss a day of training. Comedic and cheerful, children take a liking to him. As an astronomer, he dreams of contacting and befriending alien life-forms.
- Yosuke Shima (島 洋介, Shima Yōsuke)/Dyna Blue (ダイナブルー, Daina Burū): He is from Ishigaki Island. A swimmer and surfer who dreams of inventing artificial gills to allow people to breathe underwater and enjoy waterlife in all of its glory. He has extensive knowledge of sealife. He despises losing, always wanting to make up for failures he is responsible for. His exclusive vehicles are the Surf Jet and the Attack Board.
- Kosaku Nango (南郷 耕作, Nangō Kōsaku)/Dyna Yellow (ダイナイエロー, Daina Ierō): A nature lover from Kyushu who dreams to improve plant and farm breeds, aiming to develop new foods and flowers. Although he plays the clown, deep down he is a tender and serious man.
- Rei Tachibana (立花 レイ, Tachibana Rei)/Dyna Pink (ダイナピンク, Daina Pinku): She dreams of inventing a machine in order to understand and communicate with animals despite her fear of cats. A skilled fencer, Rei dislikes fighting, but fights for the sake of protecting everyone's dream and the safety of the world.

=== Allies ===
- Doctor Kyutaro Yumeno (夢野久太郎, Yumeno Kyūtarō): The 44-year old founder of the Yumeno Invention Center and Science Squad, whose original name was Professor Toyoma. 15 years ago, he discovered a "'Retro Gene'" that increases cells. However, he soon detected abnormalities in volcanic regions, leading to his discovery of the existence of the Jashinka, who subsequently killed his wife. In response, he created the Kagaku Sentai to oppose them, changing his name and going into hiding in the process. While in the Yumeno Center, he puts on a cheerful face, immediately turning all business and no-nonsense when dealing in Dyna Station. His dream is to inspire the dream of others.

=== Tailed-People Clan Jashinka Empire ===
The Tailed-People Clan Jashinka Empire (有尾人一族ジャシンカ帝国, Yūbijin Ichizoku Jashinka Teikoku) evolved from an alien race of reptiles. They arrived at Earth in ancient times, the life-forms being carried along with a meteorite, crashing into the Earth, and falling deep into its core. As time went on, the life-forms evolved, becoming the civilized Tailed-People Clan. The Tailed-People are a civilization of advanced science (higher than human's), with the rank of their civilization being determined by the number of tails. Believing Earth to be theirs, for their civilization to rise, they begin their invasion. Originally planning to turn humans into their own kind, the experiment failed, and their strategy was changed to simply destroying mankind by reducing the number of human beings as the Tailed-People Clan was outnumbered. Being as the number of tails determines rank, the Emperor's dream is to obtain ten tails, which is said to provide one with eternal life and powers. Their rank and status is determined by the number of tails each member has. The more tails, the greater the status.

- Emperor Aton (帝王アトン, Teiō Aton): The ringleader who orders the invasion and building of the Jashinka Empire above. With nine tails, he believes in the legend and dreams of obtaining the tenth tail that will provide eternal life and super powers, which he believes he will obtain once he's conquered humans. His cruelty unmatched, he originally shows protection of his son, Megiddo, until one failure too many. He possesses ESP abilities and wields the Emperor Sword. Killed by his own son after a long duel but not before giving Princess Chimera the Emperor Sword to make Megiddo Emperor.
- General Kar (カー将軍, Kā-shōgun): The Seven-tailed "God of War," Kar is the second in command who developed the Evolution Beast manufacturing machine called the Progressor Machine. Extremely loyal to Aton, he is later set-up by General Zenobia and Dark Knight, forcing him to challenge Dynaman to a fight to prove his innocence and loyalty and dies as a result.
- Prince Megiddo (メギド王子, Megido-ōji): The son of Aton. He originally had five tails until he lost one during his first fight with Dyna Red, becoming a disgrace to his clan and developing a grudge towards Dyna Red. But due to prideful arrogance and temper, he continuously fails. In Episode 38, after being prosecuted by Zenobia, his remaining tails are cut off and he's exiled into the Millennium Cave prison by his own father. Swearing revenge, he breaks free from the prison, becoming Dark Knight (ダークナイト, Dāku Naito), wielder of the "Dance of Darkness" technique. As Dark Knight, he is not only an enemy of Dynaman, but of Jashinka, as well. Calling himself "the messenger of darkness", he first lets his presence known by stealing Aton's Emperor Sword (Episode 44). He shows most hatred for General Zenobia and Dyna Red. He was given the title of Emperor by his father after his mask of Dark Knight was destroyed by Dyna Red and he dueled his father as Dark Knight. He was then called Emperor Megiddo (帝王メギド, Teiō Megido). Megiddo died when his ship crashed into the ground.
  - Gira (ギーラ, Gīra) and Geel (ギール, Gīru): The bodyguards of Megiddo. The Sippo Soldiers are distinguished by their clothing and berets. They were eaten by a monster plant that was harvested by Butterfly Shinka.
- Princess Chimera (王女キメラ, Ōjo Kimera): The witch niece of Aton, cousin of Megiddo. She has a short, round tail of four. She respects Aton and is a master in illusions and psychokinesis. She is excellent at strategies to fool humans by using disguises and charm. She is Rei / Dyna Pink's rival. As prideful as her cousin Megiddo, the two constantly bicker. She died alongside Meggido.
- General Zenobia (ゼノビア将軍, Zenobia-shōgun): A new general with seven tails who appears in episode 37. She destroyed the Invention Center. A combat expert with seven tails, she too holds the title of general. Also a priestess who deals in ritual. Eight years ago, she tried to assassinate Aton and take the throne for herself. While conspirators were executed, Aton chose to banish Zenobia to imprisonment in the Millennium Cave out of fear of her witchcraft knowledge. After escaping from it, she swears loyalty to Aton, fighting Dynaman while secretly planning to overthrowing him and develop her own tenth tail. Spied on by Megiddo, Zenobia sets him up by having him banished to the Millennium Cave, masking it as a contempt for failure. She discovers the Retro Gene, attempting to use it in growing the tenth tail. When Zenobia does grow a tenth tail, she dies afterwards.
- Sippo Soldiers (シッポ兵, Shippo-hei): The foot soldiers of the empire. They are humanoid lizards with red eyes, green and black skin and one tail. They are fully capable of speech, as demonstrated after Megiddo loses a tail in his first fight with Dyna Red.

==== Evolution Beasts ====
The Evolution Beasts (進化獣, Shinkajū) are the monsters used by the Tailed-People Clan Jashinka Empire that are created from the "Life Soup" mixed with the genetics of an animal that is placed in the Progressor Machine. To make the Evolution Beasts grow into Mechaevolution Beasts (メカ進化獣, Meka Shinkajū), the Tailed-People Clan Jashinka Empire would have them undergo the Big Bang Process.

- Crab Evo (カニシンカ, Kani Shinka): A one-eyed crab-themed Evolution Beast.
- Rhino Evo (サイシンカ, Saishinka): A rhinoceros-themed Evolution Beast created by General Kar.
- Bat Evo (コウモリシンカ, Kōmorishinka): A bat-themed Evolution Beast created by General Kar.
- Trilobite Evo (サンヨウチュウシンカ, Sanyōchū Shinka): A trilobite-themed Evolution Beast created by General Kar.
- Tapir Evo (バクシンカ, Baku Shinka): A tapir-themed Evolution Beast created by General Kar.
- Snake Evo (ヘビシンカ, Hebi Shinka): A snake-themed Evolution Beast.
- Sponge Evo (カイメンシンカ, Kaimenshinka): A sponge-themed Evolution Beast created by General Kar.
- Butterfly Evo (チョウシンカ, Chōshinka): A butterfly-themed Evolution Beast.
- Scorpion Evo (サソリシンカ, Sasorishinka): A scorpion-themed Evolution Beast.
- Octopus Evo (タコシンカ, Takoshinka): An octopus-themed Evolution Beast.
- Dolphin Evo (イルカシンカ, Irukashinka): A dolphin-themed Evolution Beast.
- Flea Evo (ノミシンカ, Nomishinka): A flea-themed Evolution Beast.
- Frog Evo (カエルシンカ, Kaerushinka): A frog-themed Evolution Beast.
- Diving Beetle Evo (ゲンゴロウシンカ, Gengorōshinka): A diving beetle-themed Evolution Beast.
- Gecko Evo (ヤモリシンカ, Yamorishinka): A gecko-themed Evolution Beast.
- Archaeopteryx Evo (シソチョウシンカ, Shisochōshinka): An Archaeopteryx-themed Evolution Beast.
- Dinosaur Evo (キョウリュウシンカ, Kyōryūshinka): A dinosaur-themed Evolution Beast with the traits of a Triceratops, a Spinosaurus, and a Stegosaurus.
- Stingray Evo (エイシンカ, Eishinka): A stingray-themed Evolution Beast.
- Porcupine Evo (ヤマアラシシンカ, Yamārashishinka): A porcupine-themed Evolution Beast.
- Squid Evo (イカシンカ, Ikashinka): A squid-themed Evolution Beast.
- Crocodile Evo (ワニシンカ, Wanishinka): A crocodile-themed Evolution Beast.
- Cat Evo (ネコシンカ, Nekoshinka): A cat-themed Evolution Beast.
- Fox Evo (キツネシンカ, Kitsuneshinka): A fox-themed Evolution Beast.
- Bee Evo (ハチシンカ, Hachishinka): A bee-themed Evolution Beast.
- Starfish Evo (ヒトデシンカ, Hitodeshinka): A starfish-themed Evolution Beast.
- Cicada Evo (セミシンカ, Semishinka): A cicada-themed Evolution Beast.
- Striped Mosquito Evo (ヤブカシンカ, Yabukashinka): A mosquito-themed Evolution Beast.
- Cactus Evo (サボテンシンカ, Sabotenshinka): A cactus-themed Evolution Beast created by Princess Chimera.
- Thorn Ant Evo (トゲアリシンカ, Togearishinka): An ant-themed Evolution Beast created by General Kar.
- Mantis Evo (カマキリシンカ, Kamakirishinka): A mantis-themed Evolution Beast.
- Spider Evo (クモシンカ, Kumoshinka): A spider-themed Evolution Beast.
- Mammoth Evo (マンモスシンカ, Manmosushinka): A mammoth-themed Evolution Beast created by General Kar.

===== Mechaevolution Beasts =====
The Mechaevolution Beasts (メカ進化獣, Meka Shinkajū) are the metallic hybrids of an animal and a weapon that are created through the same way in the Progressor Machine when it was upgraded to the Mecha Progressor Machine. To make a Mechaevolution Beast grow, the Big Bang Beam would be fired on them.

- Missile Crayfish (ミサイルザリガニ, Misairuzarigani): A crayfish/missile-themed Mechaevolution Beast created by General Kar.
- Guillotine Lizard (ギロチントカゲ, Girochin Tokage): A frilled lizard-themed Mechaevolution Beast with scissors for a left hand that was created by General Kar.
- Machinegun Jaguar (マシンガンジャガー, Mashingan Jagā): A black jaguar-themed Mechaevolution Beast with a machine gun for a right hand.
- Electric Eel (エレキウナギ, Ereki Unagi): An eel/electric generator-themed Mechaevolution Beast.
- Armor Rose (ヨロイローズ, Yoroi Rōzu): A rose/iron armour-themed Mechaevolution Beast created by General Zenobia.
- Laser Hawk (レーザーホーク, Rēzā Hōku): A hawk-themed Mechaevolution Beast with a laser weapon for a left hand that was created by General Kar.
- Word Processor Armadillo (ワープロアルマジロ, Wāpuro Arumajiro): An armadillo/word processor-themed Mechaevolution Beast.
- Drill Horse (ドリルホース, Doriruhōsu): A horse/drill-themed Mechaevolution Beast created by General Zenobia. It was later upgraded into a Pegasus/drill-themed form called Drill Pegasus (ドリルペガサス, Dorirupegasasu) after obtaining a powerful jet pack.
- Axe Bear (マサカリベアー, Masakari Beā): An Asian black bear-themed Mechaevolution Beast with an masakari-like axe for a right hand.
- Rocket Tiger (ロケットタイガー, Roketto Taigā): A tiger-themed Mechaevolution Beast with a rocket launcher on its right shoulder.
- Shovel Kong (ショベルコング, Shoberu Kongu): A gorilla-themed Mechaevolution Beast with shovels for a right hand.
- Rainbow Chameleon (レインボーカメレオン, Reinbō Kamereon): A chameleon/lens-themed Mechaevolution Beast.
- Jet Flying Squirrel (ジェットムササビ, Jetto Musasabi): A flying squirrel/jet engine-themed Mechaevolution Beast with a crossbow for a right hand.
- Poison Gas Weasel (ドクガスイタチ, Doku Gasu Itachi): A gas mask-wearing weasel-themed Mechaevolution Beast with a gas tank on its back that contains different gases.
- Boomerang Jackal (ブーメランジャッカル, Būmeran Jakkaru): A jackal/boomerang-themed Mechaevolution Beast created by General Kar.
- Computer Dragon (コンピュータードラゴン, Konpyutā Doragon): A "legendary" dragon/computer-themed Mechaevolution Beast created by General Kar.
- Fire Sphinx (ファイヤースフィンクス, Faiyā Sufinkusu): A "legendary" Sphinx-themed Mechaevolution Beast with a flamethrower for a lower right arm that was created by General Kar as part of the Mecha Progressor's failsafe following his death. In addition, it was combined with the mystic powers of Egypt.

== Episodes ==
No.	Title	Directed by	Written by	Original release date
1	"The Tailed-People Clan's Challenge"; Transliteration: "Yūbijin Ichizoku no Chōsen" (Japanese: 有尾人一族の挑戦)	Shohei Tojo	Hirohisa Soda	February 5, 1983
2	"Warriors Who Chase Dreams"; Transliteration: "Yume o Ou Senshitachi" (Japanese: 夢を追う戦士たち)	Shohei Tojo	Hirohisa Soda	February 12, 1983
3	"Bat Hell Flight"; Transliteration: "Kōmori Jigoku Hikō" (Japanese: コウモリ地獄飛行)	Minoru Yamada	Hirohisa Soda	February 19, 1983
4	"The Rumbling Fossil-Human"; Transliteration: "Gorogoro Kaseki Ningen" (Japanese: ゴロゴロ化石人間)	Minoru Yamada	Hirohisa Soda	February 26, 1983
5	"The Evolution Beast's Scary Dream"; Transliteration: "Shinkajū no Kowai Yume" (Japanese: 進化獣のこわい夢)	Shohei Tojo	Hirohisa Soda	March 5, 1983
6	"Fight to the Death! The Haunts of a Poisonous Snake"; Transliteration: "Shitō! Dokuja no Makyō" (Japanese: 死闘! 毒蛇の魔境)	Takafumi Hattori	Kousuke Miki	March 12, 1983
7	"Operation Tokyo Sea of Fire"; Transliteration: "Tōkyō Hi no Umi Sakusen" (Japanese: 東京火の海作戦!)	Takafumi Hattori	Kyoko Sagiyama	March 19, 1983
8	"Evil Flower Princess Chimera"; Transliteration: "Aku no Hana Ōjo Kimera" (Japanese: 悪の花王女キメラ)	Minoru Yamada	Hirohisa Soda	March 26, 1983
9	"The Do-or-Die Bomb Race"; Transliteration: "Kesshi no Bakudan Rēsu" (Japanese: 決死の爆弾レース)	Minoru Yamada	Hirohisa Soda	April 2, 1983
10	"The Intruder From Outer Space"; Transliteration: "Uchū Kara no Shinnyūsha" (Japanese: 宇宙からの侵入者)	Shohei Tojo	Kenji Terada	April 9, 1983
11	"The Day Fish Attack Humans"; Transliteration: "Sakana ga Ningen o Osou Hi" (Japanese: 魚が人間を襲う日)	Shohei Tojo	Kenji Terada	April 16, 1983
12	"The Targeted Blood Bank"; Transliteration: "Nerawareta Ketsueki Ginkō" (Japanese: 狙われた血液銀行)	Takafumi Hattori	Isao Matsumoto	April 23, 1983
13	"The Kidnapped Brides"; Transliteration: "Sarawareta Hanayome" (Japanese: さらわれた花嫁)	Takafumi Hattori	Kyoko Sagiyama	April 30, 1983
14	"Assault, Choroppo Soldier"; Transliteration: "Totsugeki Choroppo Hei" (Japanese: 突撃チョロッポ兵)	Minoru Yamada	Kenji Terada	May 7, 1983
15	"Ninjutsu vs. Chimera Witchcraft"; Transliteration: "Ninjutsu Tai Kimera Yōjutsu" (Japanese: 忍術対キメラ妖術)	Minoru Yamada	Hirohisa Soda	May 14, 1983
16	"The Big Mt. Aso Explosion Operation"; Transliteration: "Asosan Dai Bakuhatsu Sakusen" (Japanese: 阿蘇山大爆発作戦)	Shohei Tojo	Hirohisa Soda	May 21, 1983
17	"Fear! Kyushu Major Earthquake"; Transliteration: "Kyōfu! Kyūshū Daijishin" (Japanese: 恐怖! 九州大地震)	Shohei Tojo	Hirohisa Soda	May 28, 1983
18	"The Big Tsunami That Attacks Tokyo"; Transliteration: "Tōkyō o Osou Ōtsunami" (Japanese: 東京を襲う大津波)	Minoru Yamada	Kyoko Sagiyama	June 4, 1983
19	"The Fuse is a Red Toxic Flower"; Transliteration: "Dōkasen wa Akai Doku Hana" (Japanese: 導火線は赤い毒花)	Minoru Yamada	Isao Matsumoto	June 11, 1983
20	"Chase! The Amakusa Sun"; Transliteration: "Oe! Amakusa no Taiyō" (Japanese: 追え! 天草の太陽)	Shohei Tojo	Hirohisa Soda	June 18, 1983
21	"Angry Hokuto's Deadly Sword"; Transliteration: "Ikari no Hokuto Hissatsu Ken" (Japanese: 怒りの北斗必殺剣)	Takafumi Hattori	Hirohisa Soda	June 25, 1983
22	"The Great Prank War"; Transliteration: "Itazura Dai Sensō" (Japanese: いたずら大戦争!)	Takafumi Hattori	Ichirou Yamanaka	July 2, 1983
23	"Operation Human Slug"; Transliteration: "Ningen Namekuji Sakusen" (Japanese: 人間ナメクジ作戦)	Shohei Tojo	Kyoko Sagiyama	July 9, 1983
24	"The Dreadful Comet's Great Approach"; Transliteration: "Kyōfu no Suisei Dai Sekkin" (Japanese: 恐怖の彗星大接近)	Shohei Tojo	Shunsuke Yoshida	July 16, 1983
25	"The Mysterious Guffaw Hell"; Transliteration: "Nazo no Geragera Jigoku" (Japanese: 謎のゲラゲラ地獄)	Minoru Yamada	Shunsuke Yoshida	July 23, 1983
26	"Intense Fighting! The Solar Lighthouse"; Transliteration: "Gekitō! Taiyō no Tōdai" (Japanese: 激闘! 太陽の灯台)	Minoru Yamada	Isao Matsumoto	July 30, 1983
27	"Chirping Cicada: The Sound of Death"; Transliteration: "Shi no Oto Semishigure" (Japanese: 死の音セミシグレ)	Minoru Yamada	Kenji Terada	August 6, 1983
28	"Rescue the Doll-Humans!"; Transliteration: "Ningyō Ningen o Sukue!" (Japanese: 人形人間を救え!)	Shohei Tojo	Kenji Terada	August 13, 1983
29	"Chimera's Cursed Clothes"; Transliteration: "Kimera no Noroi no Fuku" (Japanese: キメラの呪いの服)	Minoru Yamada	Hirohisa Soda	August 20, 1983
30	"The Enemy is a Geek Evolution Beast"; Transliteration: "Teki wa Gariben Shinkajū" (Japanese: 敵はガリ勉進化獣)	Shohei Tojo	Hirohisa Soda	August 27, 1983
31	"The Spy Tailed-Person's Trap"; Transliteration: "Supai Yūbijin no Wana" (Japanese: スパイ有尾人の罠)	Nagafumi Hori	Hirohisa Soda	September 3, 1983
32	"The Missing Power Gun"; Transliteration: "Reddo ni Narenai" (Japanese: 消えたパワーガン)	Shohei Tojo	Hirohisa Soda	September 10, 1983
33	"I Can't Become Red"; Transliteration: "Reddo ni Narenai" (Japanese: レッドになれない)	Nagafumi Hori	Hirohisa Soda	September 17, 1983
34	"Formidable Enemy! Mechaevolution"; Transliteration: "Kyōteki! Mekashinka" (Japanese: 強敵! メカシンカ)	Takafumi Hattori	Hirohisa Soda	September 24, 1983
35	"Seeking a New Finishing Move"; Transliteration: "Shin Hissatsu-waza o Motomete" (Japanese: 新必殺技を求めて)	Takafumi Hattori	Hirohisa Soda	October 1, 1983
36	"It Came Forth!! The Finishing Move"; Transliteration: "Deta zo! Hissatsu-waza" (Japanese: 出たぞ! 必殺技!)	Shohei Tojo	Hirohisa Soda	October 8, 1983
37	"Female General Zenobia"; Transliteration: "Onna Shōgun Zenobia" (Japanese: 女将軍ゼノビア)	Shohei Tojo	Hirohisa Soda	October 15, 1983
38	"Rejuvenate! Genius Brain"; Transliteration: "Wakagaere! Tensai Dzunō" (Japanese: 若返れ! 天才頭脳)	Minoru Yamada	Hirohisa Soda	October 22, 1983
39	"Hold it! The Egg of the Tailed-People"; Transliteration: "Idake! Yūbijin no Tamago" (Japanese: 抱け! 有尾人の卵)	Minoru Yamada	Hirohisa Soda	October 29, 1983
40	"Explosion! Silent Anger"; Transliteration: "Bakuhatsu! Mugon no Ikari" (Japanese: 爆発! 無言の怒り)	Minoru Yamada	Hirohisa Soda	November 5, 1983
41	"The Biker Gang Who Disappeared in the Darkness"; Transliteration: "Yami ni Kieta Bōsōzoku" (Japanese: 闇に消えた暴走族)	Nagafumi Hori	Isao Matsumoto	November 12, 1983
42	"Challenge: The Dark Knight"; Transliteration: "Chōsen Dāku Naito" (Japanese: 挑戦ダークナイト)	Nagafumi Hori	Hirohisa Soda	November 19, 1983
43	"Shima! You're Blue Lightning"; Transliteration: "Shima! Kimi wa Aoi Inazuma" (Japanese: 島! 君は青い稲妻)	Minoru Yamada	Hirohisa Soda	November 26, 1983
44	"Explosion! Magma Bomb"; Transliteration: "Bakuhatsu! Maguma Bakudan" (Japanese: 爆発! マグマ爆弾)	Minoru Yamada	Isao Matsumoto	December 3, 1983
45	"Mama is Zenobia?"; Transliteration: "Mama wa Zenobia?" (Japanese: ママはゼノビア?)	Shohei Tojo	Hirohisa Soda	December 10, 1983
46	"The Saber That Runs Love Through"; Transliteration: "Ai o Tsuranuku Sāberu" (Japanese: 愛を貫くサーベル)	Shohei Tojo	Kyoko Sagiyama	December 17, 1983
47	"An Evil Wish, Ten Tails"; Transliteration: "Aku no Negai Juppon Shippo" (Japanese: 悪の願い十本尻尾)	Takafumi Hattori	Hirohisa Soda	December 24, 1983
48	"Dr. Yumeno's Big Secret"; Transliteration: "Yumeno-hakase no Dai Himitsu" (Japanese: 夢野博士の大秘密)	Takafumi Hattori	Hirohisa Soda	January 7, 1984
49	"The End of General Kar"; Transliteration: "Kā Shōgun no Saigo" (Japanese: カー将軍の最期)	Shohei Tojo	Hirohisa Soda	January 14, 1984
50	"The Revived Formidable Enemy"; Transliteration: "Yomigaetta Kyōteki" (Japanese: よみがえった強敵)	Shohei Tojo	Hirohisa Soda	January 21, 1984
51	"The Fight That Flew Through Tomorrow"; Transliteration: "Asu o Kaketa Tatakai" (Japanese: 明日をかけた戦い)	Shohei Tojo	Hirohisa Soda	January 28, 1984

- A movie version of episode 32, "The Missing Power Gun" was also released.

== Cast ==
- Hokuto Dan: Satoshi Okita
- Ryu Hoshikawa: Junichi Haruta
- Yosuke Shima: Koji Unogi
- Kosaku Nango: Yu Tokita
- Rei Tachibana: Sayoko Hagiwara
- Dr. Kyutaro Yumeno: Junji Shimada
- Prince Megiddo: Takeki Hayashi
- General Kar: Masashi Ishibashi
- Princess Chimera: Mari Kouno
- General Zenobia: Ritsuko Fujiyama
- Emperor Aton: Takeshi Watabe (voice)
- Dark Knight: Michirou Iida (voice)

== Songs ==
Opening theme

- "Kagaku Sentai Dynaman" (科学戦隊ダイナマン, Kagaku Sentai Dainaman)
  - Lyrics: Kazuo Koike
  - Composition & Arrangement: Kensuke Kyō (京 建輔, Kyō Kensuke)
  - Artist: MoJo, (Chorus) Koorogi '73

Ending theme

- "Yume o Kanaete Dynaman" (夢をかなえてダイナマン, Yume o Kanaete Dainaman; "Dynaman Fulfills our Dreams")
  - Lyrics: Kazuo Koike
  - Composition & Arrangement: Kensuke Kyō
  - Artist: MoJo

== English dubbed version ==
In 1988, the USA Network late-night show Night Flight ran six episodes of Dynaman dubbed into English, with a satirical take that bore only a cursory resemblance to the original dialogue. The Nickelodeon network repeated the dubbed episodes on the 1988 show Special Delivery. The director was John Beaulieu, and the writers were Gideon Brower and Shari Roman. Among the voice actors were Mark McKinney as DynaBlue and Jefferson Mays as DynaBeige.

== Dubbed Episodes ==
No.	Title	Directed by	Written by
1	"Pilot: Cy Steinberg"	John Beaulieu	Gideon Brower & Shari Roman
2	"Rhinoman"	John Beaulieu	Gideon Brower & Shari Roman
3	"Day of the Dolphin; Flipper’s Revenge"	John Beaulieu	Gideon Brower & Shari Roman
4	"The Lizard of Oz"	John Beaulieu	Gideon Brower & Shari Roman
5	"The Seven Loves of Lucky Pierre"	John Beaulieu	Gideon Brower & Shari Roman
6	"Last Adventure of Spunky the Wonder Squid"	John Beaulieu	Gideon Brower & Shari Roman
