= Sayoko Hagiwara =

Japanese actress

- 萩原 佐代子
- Born: December 1, 1962 (age 63); Tokyo, Japan
- Education: Nihon University
- Occupation: Actress
- Years active: 1980–present
- Known for: Rei Tachibana / Dyna Pink of Kagaku Sentai Dynaman
- Height: 1.66 m (5 ft 5 in)
- Spouse: Yu Tokita

Sayoko Hagiwara (萩原 佐代子, Hagiwara Sayoko; born December 1, 1962) is a Japanese actress from Tokyo, noted for her multiple tokusatsu heroine roles in the 1980s. She is married to Yu Tokita, her co-star in Kagaku Sentai Dynaman.

== Filmography ==
Year	Title	Role	Notes
1980-1981	Ultraman 80	Ryoko Hoshi / Yullian	8 episodes
1983-1984	Kagaku Sentai Dynaman	Rei Tachibana / Dyna Pink	51 episodes
1983	Kagaku Sentai Dynaman the Movie	Rei Tachibana / Dyna Pink	
1986-1987	Choushinsei Flashman	Ley Nefel	50 episodes
1986	Choushinsei Flashman the Movie	Ley Nefel	
2010	Ultraman Zero: The Revenge of Belial	Yullian	Voice
2011	Gokaiger Goseiger Super Sentai 199 Hero Great Battle	Rei Tachibana / Dyna-Pink	
2014	Zyuden Sentai Kyoryuger	Reiko Tanba	TV series
