= Nebula Mask Machineman =

Television series

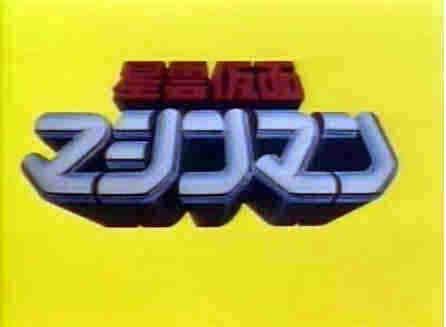
- Seiun Kamen Machineman titlecard
- Genre: Tokusatsu
- Created by: Shotaro Ishinomori
- Developed by: Shozo Uehara; Susumu Takaku
- Directed by: Takeshi Ogasawara
- Starring: Osamu Sakuta; Kiyomi Tsukada; Kazuhiko Ohara; Kansai Eto; Yuko Murakoshi; Joe Onodera; Hideyo Amamoto; Chiaki Kojo
- Narrated by: Osamu Kobayashi
- Composer: Yuji Ohno
- Country of origin: Japan
- No. of episodes: 36 (35 episodes + 1 roundup)

Production
- Running time: 24 minutes
- Production companies: Toei Company; Ishimori Productions

Original release
- Network: NTV/NNS
- Release: January 13 – September 28, 1984

Nebula Mask Machineman (星雲仮面マシンマン, Seiun Kamen Mashinman) is a Japanese tokusatsu television series created by Shotaro Ishinomori and produced by Toei Company. It aired from January 13 until September 28, 1984. It revolves around the adventures of Nick (Nikku), a college student from the Ivy planet (located at the Pleiades) and his arrival on Earth to study the earthlings' behavior. Upon arrival, he is called in for the activities of the evil organization called "Tentacle", whose don, Professor K, wishes to eliminate all children in the world.

The series is rumored to have been inspired by the American DC Comics superhero, Superman, although this was never confirmed by either Ishinomori or Toei.

== Plot ==
Traveling in the spaceship "Space Colony", Nick, with the help of his ball-shaped robot "Ball Boy", arrive on Earth to study the behavior and manners of human beings for his doctoral degree thesis. Under the human identity of a young man named Ken Takase, he meets Maki Hayama, a photographer at Shukan Hit newspaper, and later saves her from a building fall. Maki was taking pictures for a scoop about a building which had been mysteriously demolished. Later, she and Ken find that the evil organization "Tentacle" is behind the demolitions and other evil deeds around the world. Nick then decides to extend his stay on Earth and uses his advanced technology and superior powers to protect Maki and the children of Earth under the alter-ego of Machineman, a red- and yellow-suited superhero. Armed with an advanced technology weapons, he begins fighting Tentacle's cyborgs and protect humankind.

A few episodes later, Machineman succeeds in dismantling Tentacle; however, Professor K flees to Spain and his niece, Lady M, appears. With her aide Tonchinkan, they establish a new organization called "Octopus". Like her uncle, she is allergic to children (whenever she is near one, her nose turns red). In the beginning, she calls up various thieves and legendary criminals from around the world, but later robotic drones are assembled to combat Machineman. By the end of the series, the missing Professor K returns, bringing with him the biggest threat the hero had ever faced: Golden Monsu, a fortified version of Tetsujin Monsu.

== Main characters ==
- Ken Takase (Nick)/Machineman (高瀬 健(ニック)／マシンマン, Takase Ken (Nikku)/Mashinman): the series' protagonist and main hero, Ken was born at the Ivy Planet and eventually graduated with a degree in Sociology. Upon arriving on Earth, his primary objective is studying human behavior and mannerisms in order to obtain his doctoral degree. However, upon meeting Maki and learn about Tentacle, he decides to stay longer in order to protect her and the children from Professor K's plans.
- Ball Boy (ボールボーイ, Bōru Bōi): a baseball-shaped robot who is Nick's companion. Smart and clever, it usually serves as his friend, advisor and sidekick, to a certain point. It is also used as a throwing projectile by Machineman in battles, under the name "Fighting Ball". Ironically, Ball Boy says it does not have any information about baseball.
- Maki Hayama (葉山 真紀, Hayama Maki): a photographer and journalist at Shukan Hit newspaper. She is involved in a traffic accident with Ken and they eventually become friends. She instantly falls for Machineman after being saved by him, but begins to fall in love with Ken a few episodes later.
- Masaru Hayama (葉山 勝, Hayama Masaru): Maki's 10-year-old brother. Usually serves as victim of Tentacle's inventions and is saved by Ken/Machineman.
- Editor-in-chief Henshu (編集長, Henshū Chō): The editor-in-chief of Shukan Hit, and Maki's boss.
- Rumiko (ルミ子): A member of Shukan Hit's junior editorial staff.
- Kameta (亀太): The greengrocer for the Hayama family.
- Hiroshi (浩), Saburo (三郎, Saburō), Yutaka (豊) & Misa (美佐): Masaru's classmates, that were involved with the incidents of Tentacle and Octopus.

== Criminal Groups ==
=== Tentacle ===
Tentacle (テンタクル, Tentakuru) is the organization led by Professor K.

- Professor K (プロフェッサーK, Purofessā Kei): The leader of the Tentacle criminal organization.
- Iron Man Monsu (鉄人モンス, Tetsujin Monsu): A humanoid robot that serves as Tentacle's chief executive. In episode 17, Monsu was defeated by Machineman.
- Mechanical Parrot (メカオウム, Meka Ōmu): A robotic parrot created by Professor K, and can speak fluently.

=== Octopus ===
Octopus (オクトパス, Okutopasu) is the succeeding organization led by Lady M, after taking over Tentacle.

- Lady M (レディーM, Redī Emu): The niece of Professor K, who made her appearance in Episode 20 after her trip from Spain. She renovated Tentacle's headquarters to form Octopus.
- TonChinKan (トンチンカン, Tonchinkan): Lady M's boyfriend.

== Episodes ==
1. The White Textbook Case (教科書真っ白事件, Kyōkasho Masshiro Jiken): written by Shozo Uehara, directed by Takeshi Ogasawara
2. Rainbow-Colored Diamond Tears (涙は虹色のダイヤ, Namida wa Nijiiro no Daiya): written by Shozo Uehara, directed by Takeshi Ogasawara
3. Crush the Idol (アイドルをつぶせ, Aidoru o Tsubuse): written by Shozo Uehara, directed by Shohei Tojo
4. Magical Stone Baked Potato (魔法の石焼きイモ, Mahō no Ishi Yakiimo): written by Susumu Takaku, directed by Shohei Tojo
5. The Stamp Thief of Three-Hundred Million Yen (三億円の切手泥棒, San'oku En no Kitte Dorobō): written by Susumu Takaku, directed by Takeshi Ogasawara
6. Me... Mama's Children? (私、ママの子供?, Watashi, Mama no Kodomo?): written by Shozo Uehara, directed by Takeshi Ogasawara
7. Hong Kong Karate Dangerous Ken (香港空手危うし健, Honkon Karate Ayaushi Ken): written by Susumu Takaku, directed by Michio Konishi
8. Secret of the Baseball Boy (野球少年の秘密, Yakyū Shōnen no Himitsu): written by Susumu Takaku, directed by Michio Konishi
9. The Mustache-Growing Girl (髭のはえた女の子, Hige no Haeta On'nanoko): written by Susumu Takaku, directed by Takeshi Ogasawara
10. Telepathy Battle (テレパシー大作戦, Terepashī Daisakusen): written by Susumu Takaku, directed by Takeshi Ogasawara
11. Unimaginable Part-Time Job (とんだアルバイト, Donda Arubaito): written by Shozo Uehara, directed by Shohei Tojo
12. Children are Disappearing (子供が消えていく, Kodomo ga Kieteiku): written by Susumu Takaku, directed by Shohei Tojo
13. K's Look-alike (Kのそっくりさん, Kei no Sokkurisan): written by Noboru Sugimura, directed by Takeshi Ogasawara
14. Ball Boy's Leaving Home (ボールボーイ家出, Bōrubōi Iede): written by Susumu Takaku, directed by Takeshi Ogasawara
15. The Demon's Present (悪魔のプレゼント, Akuma no Puresento): written by Atsuko Osoya, directed by Shohei Tojo
16. Maki Hates Mice (真紀はネズミ嫌い, Maki wa Nezumi Kirai): written by Susumu Takaku, directed by Shohei Tojo
17. Ironman Monsu's End (鉄人モンスの最後, Tetsujin Monsu no Saigo): written by Susumu Takaku, directed by Takeshi Ogasawara
18. It's Nopperabo! (のっぺらぼうだ!, Nopperabō da!): written by Noboru Sugimura, directed by Takeshi Ogasawara
19. Stray Dog Koro's Adventure (野良犬コロの冒険, Norainu Koro no Bouken): written by Susumu Takaku, directed by Shohei Tojo
20. Octopus Queen (オクトパスの女王, Okutopasu no Joō): written by Susumu Takaku, directed by Shohei Tojo
21. Rain Rain Fall Fall! (雨雨降れ降れ!, Ame Ame Fure Fure!): written by Noboru Sugimura, directed by Takeshi Ogasawara
22. The Clown's Secret Commands (ピエロの秘密指令, Piero no Himitsu Shirei): written by Susumu Takaku, directed by Takeshi Ogasawara
23. Interesting Funny Gun (おもしろおかし銃, Omoshiro Okashi Jū): written by Susumu Takaku, directed by Shohei Tojo
24. Showdown! The Ninja Thief (対決! 忍者泥棒, Taiketsu! Ninja Dorobō): written by Noboru Sugimura, directed by Shohei Tojo
25. Challenge of the Mummy-Man (ミイラ男の挑戦, Mīra-Otoko no Chōsen): written by Isao Matsumoto, directed by Atsuo Okunaka
26. Scary! The Laughing Doll (こわい! 笑う人形, Kowai! Warau Ningyō): written by Noboru Sugimura, directed by Atsuo Okunaka
27. Monster's Hands Swimming At Sea (海を泳ぐ怪物の手, Umi o Oyogu Kaibutsu no Te): written by Susumu Takaku and Tatsuro Nagai, directed by Takeshi Ogasawara
28. I Like I Like! Maki (好き好き! 真紀, Suki Suki! Maki): written by Noboru Sugimura, directed by Takeshi Ogasawara
29. Find the Pirate's Treasure! (海賊の宝を探せ!, Kaizoku no Takara o Sagase!): written by Noboru Sugimura, directed by Atsuo Okunaka
30. The Village Inhabited by the Red Demon (赤い鬼のすむ村, Akai Oni no Sumu Mura): written by Susumu Takaku, directed by Shohei Tojo
31. The Dangerous Gourd (危険なひょうたん, Kiken'na Hyōtan): written by Noboru Sugimura, directed by Shohei Tojo
32. Voice of a Bird Called Conflict (争いを呼ぶ鳥の声, Arasoi o Yobu Tori no Koe): written by Susumu Takaku, directed by Atsuo Okunaka
33. The Dogs have a Time Bomb (時限爆弾を抱く犬, Jigenbakudan o Daku Inu): written by Susumu Takaku, directed by Shohei Tojo
34. K and M's Winning Strategy (KとMの必勝作戦, K to M no Hisshō Sakusen): written by Shozo Uehara, directed by Shohei Tojo
35. Today is Goodbye (さようなら今日は, Sayōnara Kyō wa): written by Shozo Uehara, directed by Shohei Tojo
36. Collection Of The Fight Scenes (戦いの名場面集, Tatakai no Meibamen Shuu): written by Shozo Uehara, directed by Saburo Yatsude

== Cast ==
- Ken Takase (Nick)/Machineman (close-ups): Osamu Sakuta (佐久田脩, Sakuta Osamu)
- Professor K: Hideyo Amamoto
- Maki Hayama: Kiyomi Tsukada
- Masaru Hayama: Kazuhiko Ohara
- Kameda: Joe Onodera
- Arata: Kansai Eto
- Rumiko Matsumoto: Yuko Murakoshi
- Lady M/Meiko: Chiaki Kojo
- Ball Boy (voice): Machiko Soga
- Tetsujin Monsu (voice): Toku Nishio
- Golden Monsu (voice): Shōzō Iizuka
- Machineman (suit actor): Jun Murakami (村上潤, Murakami Jun)
- Narrator: Osamu Kobayashi

== Songs ==
Opening theme

- "Seiun Kamen Machineman" (星雲仮面マシンマン, Seiun Kamen Mashinman)
  - Lyrics: Shotaro Ishinomori (石森 章太郎, Ishinomori Shotaro)
  - Composition: Yuji Ohno (大野 雄二, Ohno Yuji)
  - Arrangement: Yuji Ohno (大野 雄二, Ohno Yuji)
  - Artist: MoJo, Columbia Yurikago Kai

Ending theme

- "Ore no Na wa Machineman" (俺の名はマシンマン, Ore no Na wa Mashinman; "My Name is Machineman")
  - Lyrics: Saburo Yatsude
  - Composition: Yuji Ohno
  - Arrangement: Yuji Ohno
  - Artist: MoJo

== International Broadcasts ==
- In Thailand, the series received a Thai dub on Channel 7 on Saturdays and Sundays from 10:00 a.m. to 10:30 a.m. in 1984. It was re-aired on Channel 9 on Sundays in 1993.
- In the Philippines, The series was locally aired on IBC-13 in 1992.
- The series was also broadcast in Brazil: first on Rede Bandeirantes, where it had a VHS release from its video label VideoBAN, in 1990; later on the Record network in 1993, first in the morning hours, later shown at 8pm. In 1994, the series was also broadcast by TV Guaíba, at the time an independent station; the station had local rights to some series aired by Record, which had no affiliate in the state at the time. United Kids also released VHS tapes under the title "Força Total Machine Man".
