= Moio =

Moio may refer to:

- Mojo Alcantara, a municipality in Sicily, Italy
- Moio de' Calvi, a municipality in Lombardy, Italy
- Moio della Civitella, a municipality in Campania, Italy
- Moio (unit), a unit of measurement used in Portugal and its colonies

== See also ==
- Mojo (disambiguation)
- Moyo (disambiguation)
- Moiola, Italian municipality in the Province of Cuneo, Piedmont
