= Junichi Haruta =

Japanese actor (born 1955)

- 春田 純一
- Born: Misao Haruta; March 17, 1955 (age 71); Kitakyushu, Fukuoka Prefecture, Japan
- Occupations: Actor, stunt
- Years active: 1977–present

Junichi Haruta (春田 純一, Haruta Jun'ichi; born March 17, 1955) is a Japanese actor from Kitakyushu, Fukuoka Prefecture. His real name is Misao Haruta (春田 三三夫, Haruta Misao). Haruta joined the J.A.C (Japan Action Club), a theater troupe founded by Sonny Chiba, after leaving high school.

== Filmography ==
=== Television ===
- J.A.K.Q. Dengekitai (1977) – SpadeAce & BigOne suit actor
- The Yagyu Conspiracy (1978) - Haruta
- Shadow Warriors (Hattori Hanzō: Kage no Gundan) (1980) – Kiheiji
- Dai Sentai Goggle V (1982–1983) – Kanpei Kuroda / Goggle Black
- Kagaku Sentai Dynaman (1983–1984) – Ryuu Hoshikawa / Dyna Black
- Juspion (1985) – Mad Gallant (episodes 4-45)
- Choujinki Metalder (1987) - Master (episodes 25 & 26)
- Sekai Ninja Sen Jiraiya (1988) – Wind Ninja Mafuuba
- Dennou Keisatsu Cybercop (1988) – Pai Lo (episode 23)
- Tokkyu Shirei Solbrain (1991) – Sazamoto (episode 08)
- Tokusou Exceedraft (1992) – Yasaki Bunzo (episodes 7 & 8)
- Kamen Rider Blade (2004) – Yoshito Hirose
- Kōmyō ga Tsuji (2006) – Toyotomi Hidenaga
- Engine Sentai Go-onger: Boom Boom! Bang Bang! GekijōBang!! (2008) – Shishi-no-Shin
- Gokaiger Goseiger Super Sentai 199 Hero Great Battle (2011) – Kanpei Kuroda
- Kamen Rider Eternal (2011) – Doctor Prospect aka Eyes Dopant
- Zyuden Sentai Kyoryuger (2013–2014) – Genryu Rippukan
- Shuriken Sentai Ninninger (2015) - Wind Ninja Mafuuba (via Jiraiya's photo archive footage)

=== Film ===
- Sanada Yukimura no Bōryaku (1979)
- Warriors of the Rainbow: Seediq Bale (2011) - Egawa Hiromichi 江川博通, author of Bloody Sakura of Musha《霧社の血桜》
