= Mocho =

Mocho may refer to:

- Mocho people, an ethnic group of Mexico
- Mocho language, a Mayan language
- Mocho (volcano), in Chile
- Mocho Mountains, in Jamaica
- Mount Mocho, in California
- Mocho Subbasin, a groundwater basin in California

== People with the name ==
- Mocho Cota (1954–2016), Mexican wrestler
- Mocho Cota Jr. (born 1977), Mexican wrestler
- Fray Mocho (1858–1903), Argentine writer and journalist
- José Manuel Hernández, nicknamed "El Mocho" (1853–1921), Venezuelan politician

== See also ==
- Mucho
- Moxo (disambiguation)
