= Talizman =

Japanese musical group

Talizman were Japanese pop and rock band perhaps best known for performing the opening and closing songs of Ultraman 80 and three image albums for the manga Locke the Superman. They also did several songs for musicals such as the Japanese version of Hair. After the band broke up in 1981, Noboru Kimura, the vocalist of the band, operated under his stage name Harry Kimura, doing several anime and tokusatsu themes.

== Members ==
- Noboru Kimura (vocals)
- Nobuo Hocchi (guitar, vocals)
- Keiju Ishikawa (bass, vocals)
- Kenji Mishiro (keyboards, vocals)
- Satoshi Ishii (drums)
- Takami Asano (guitar, chorus): Guest on the album "Chojin Locke: Lord Leon" only.
