= Forever Mine =

- DVD cover
- Directed by: Paul Schrader
- Written by: Paul Schrader
- Produced by: Damita Nikapota; Amy Kaufman; Kathleen Haase
- Starring: Joseph Fiennes; Ray Liotta; Gretchen Mol; Vincent Laresca; Myk Watford
- Cinematography: John Bailey
- Edited by: Kristina Boden
- Music by: Angelo Badalamenti
- Distributed by: J&M Entertainment
- Release dates: 12 September 1999 (Toronto International Film Festival); 12 November 2000
- Running time: 115 minutes
- Countries: United Kingdom; Canada
- Language: English
- Budget: $17 million

Forever Mine is a 1999 romantic drama film written and directed by Paul Schrader and starring Joseph Fiennes, Gretchen Mol and Ray Liotta.

== Synopsis ==
In an airplane in 1987, two men, Alan Riply and Javier, are on their way to New York. Alan reminisces about an affair he had 14 years earlier while working as a cabana boy at an unnamed opulent beach hotel, where he falls in love with Ella Brice (Mol), the beautiful wife of business mogul Mark Brice. At first resistant, Ella reciprocates his love, and things seem to go well for some time, but eventually Ella confesses her affair to Mark, deciding it was the right thing to do. Mark responds by framing Alan of drug possession, getting him incarcerated. Mark then offers Alan a chance for freedom by simply dropping the affair and never looking for Ella again. Despite this, Alan is undeterred, and even mails letters to Ella, including one with a fingerprint in his blood coupled with a series of sincerely passionate claims. Mark decides to have Alan shot and buried alive in a construction site. Though disfigured, Alan survives and goes to Javier's to convalesce and plan his revenge. He murders a Cuban eminent criminal attorney with underworld connections, named Manuel Esquema, whose identity he assumes.

Now as Esquema, Alan arrives in New York to meet with Brice, who has gotten into legal trouble. Brice later arranges a meeting over dinner at his place, to which Esquema eagerly goes. As he arrives, he is greeted by Ella but is dismayed when she does not recognize him over his disfigurement and chinstrap beard. Esquema constantly stares at her, which Ella notices. Esquema asks about the way Ella has coped with her husband's circumstances, to which she replies that she constantly reads Madame Bovary. When Mark questions the cause of his disfigurement, Esquema states it was a birth accident. After Esquema leaves, Ella questions Mark about him, which Mark angrily brushes off.

The following day, Esquema sights Ella at a restaurant; she meets with him, supposedly to continue describing Mark's lifestyle. Esquema admits to not be interested in knowing more about him, but rather about her. Ella suddenly leaves the restaurant, forgetting her car keys. When Esquema gives them back, he offers to keep on meeting with her as he correctly deduces that loneliness is affecting her. Ella reluctantly declines. Later, Mark's associate assaults Esquema and Javier, demanding they quit following Ella. Later that evening, the associate goes to a tanning salon, where he is murdered by Javier, the latter exclaiming “Alan Ripley, believe it or not”, before delivering the fatal gunshot.

Concurrently, Esquema emerges at the Brice house and enters without anyone being at home. Ella returns to the house after work and notices his car in the driveway. She enters her home and begins calling out to see who is there. She enters her bedroom and asks whoever is there to announce themselves or she will call the police. Esquema appears out of the darkness and begins to console Ella. He tells her he has been thinking about her and starts to hold her close. In dismay, she attempts to interject but he tells her to be silent and begins to kiss her passionately. It is in that moment that she is reunited with Alan. The two make love passionately off screen and are later shown laying in bed. They plan to run away with each other.

The following day Esquema has his final interactions with Mark about his legal predicament and offers him a deal in which he will pay 600,000 and serve 10 months in Allenwood prison. After the men agree to the terms of the deal, Esquema states that there is one more condition. He says that he wants to also take his wife Ella from him, then exits the office. Outraged and confused, Mark demands to find out who this mysterious man is and heads home to confront his wife. To his dismay his wife is not at home when he arrives to look for her and confront her. Ella and Esquema are shown driving in the car together, reminiscing as they also plan their new lives as a couple.

Esquema is shown the following morning getting out of the shower. He hears someone enter the cabin. He comes out, believing it was Ella returning from grocery shopping, only to see it is Mark with a gun. Mark confronts Esquema, and confirms that he knows he is the cabana boy, saying that he regrets not killing him himself. Mark states that he will kill all three of them for love. Esquema refuses to recant his love for Ella and is shot in the neck. Mark then hears Ella returning and meets her outside of the cabin. Ella enters hysterical asking where Esquema is. Mark tells her that it is too late. She screams and begins to panic and push her way into the cabin to find him. She is grabbed by Mark who holds the gun to her head. Esquema then runs up behind Mark in an effort to save Ella. Mark and Esquema begin to fight and Mark drops the gun which Ella picks up. Once Mark is subdued, Ella runs to Esquema.

The two are shown in the back of an ambulance on their way to the hospital. Ella holds Esquema and begs him to stay with her. He closes his eyes but ultimately becomes fixed on what Ella is saying. She begins telling their story and the two of them are seen in a series of flashbacks from the hotel. The movie ends with a fading scene of them together from the beginning saying how she would be forever his. With this scene, the movie concludes.

== Release ==
Forever Mine played at the Telluride Film Festival. The film did not receive a theatrical release as the financiers filed for bankruptcy and the insurers sold the film to Starz, where it premiered November 12, 2000.

== Home Video ==
The film was released on DVD on 22 May 2001.

== Production ==
It was filmed in St. Petersburg, Florida and at the Don CeSar Beach Resort, located in St. Petersburg Beach.
