= Ultraman 80 =

Japanese television series

- Title card
- Genre: Tokusatsu; Kaiju; Superhero; Science fiction; Action; Adventure; Kyodai Hero
- Created by: Tsuburaya Productions
- Developed by: Shosuke Ai (eps 1-33); Toshiro Ishido (eps 34-50)
- Directed by: Noriaki Yuasa
- Starring: Hatsunori Hasegawa; Jin Nakayama; Masaaki Daimon; Daisuke Musō; Shūhei Nitta; Eri Ishida; Masashi Furuta; Tatsuya Okamoto; Sayoko Hagiwara; Ikuko Wada; Mayumi Asano; Saburō Bōya
- Composer: Tōru Fuyuki
- Country of origin: Japan
- No. of episodes: 50

Production
- Running time: 24 minutes (per episode)
- Production companies: Tsuburaya Productions; TBS

Original release
- Network: JNN (TBS)
- Release: April 2, 1980 – March 25, 1981

Related
- The Ultraman; Ultraman Tiga

Ultraman 80 (ウルトラマン80, Urutoraman Eiti; Ultraman Eighty) is a Japanese tokusatsu TV show produced by Tsuburaya Productions which aired on the Tokyo Broadcasting System channel from April 2, 1980, to March 25, 1981, lasting a total of 50 episodes. After going off the air in 1981, the network still aired weekly reruns of the show. It was the seventh entry (ninth overall) in the Ultra Series and began a week after the conclusion of the anime series The Ultraman. It would be the last TV series in the franchise released in Japan's Shōwa period for Japanese audiences during the following 16 years until the production of Ultraman Tiga.

== Plot ==
Following the end of the 1979-80 anime The Ultraman, Ultraman 80 returns to the setting of the main Showa continuity, taking place after 5 years of peace since the end of Ultraman Leo. A new middle school teacher Takeshi Yamato is actually the disguised Ultra from the Land of Light, Ultraman 80, whose mission is to fight a new wave of monsters resulted from Minus Energy while stabilizing his life as a teacher and UGM member. Although the initial episodes focuses on Takeshi trying to solve the daily problems of his students, starting from episode 13 onward he left the school to join UGM as a full time officer as more members keep appearing one after another in the series progress. Episode 31 returned to the setting of Takeshi interacting with the guest characters of children every week while dealing with appearing monsters and their relation to it. When the princess from the Land of Light Yullian went to Earth as a result of King Galtan's attack, she joined UGM to replace the deceased member Emi Jōno while operating with fellow Ultra Takeshi/80 in dealing against monster attacks. In the season finale, their identities were exposed by Captain Ōyama, who prevented them from participating in the fight against Margodon to prove humankind's reliability in defending the Earth. With their true nature exposed, 80 and Yullian spent their final days on Earth before departing toward the Land of Light, leaving Earth in a 25-year period of peace.

== Episodes ==
No.	Title	Directed by	Written by	Original release date
1	"Ultraman Teacher"; Transliteration: "Urutoraman Sensei" (Japanese: ウルトラマン先生)	Noriaki Yuasa	Shosuke Ai	April 2, 1980
2	"The Teacher's Secret"; Transliteration: "Sensei no Himitsu" (Japanese: 先生の秘密)	Noriaki Yuasa	Shosuke Ai	April 9, 1980
3	"Don't Cry, First Love Monster"; Transliteration: "Naku na Hatsukoi Kaijū" (Japanese: 泣くな初恋怪獣)	Kiyosumi Fukazawa	Shosuke Ai	April 16, 1980
4	"From the Sky with Love"; Transliteration: "Ōzora yori Ai o Komete" (Japanese: 大空より愛をこめて)	Kiyosumi Fukazawa	Shosuke Ai	April 23, 1980
5	"The Phantom Town"; Transliteration: "Maboroshi no Machi" (Japanese: まぼろしの街)	Noriaki Yuasa	Hiroyasu Yamaura	April 30, 1980
6	"The Boy from the Stars"; Transliteration: "Hoshi kara Kita Shōnen" (Japanese: 星から来た少年)	Noriaki Yuasa	Jō Hirose	May 7, 1980
7	"Operation Silent Tokyo"; Transliteration: "Tōkyō Sairento Sakusen" (Japanese: 東京サイレント作戦)	Kiyosumi Fukazawa	Shigemitsu Taguchi	May 14, 1980
8	"The Resurrected Legend"; Transliteration: "Yomigaetta Densetsu" (Japanese: よみがえった伝説)	Kiyosumi Fukazawa	Yasushi Hirano	May 21, 1980
9	"Airport Emergency!"; Transliteration: "Eapōto Kikiippatsu!" (Japanese: エアポート危機一髪！)	Noriaki Yuasa	Shosuke Ai	May 28, 1980
10	"Visitor from Space"; Transliteration: "Uchū kara no Hōmonsha" (Japanese: 宇宙からの訪問者)	Noriaki Yuasa	Tsutomu Tsukushi	June 4, 1980
11	"Dreadful Gas Panic"; Transliteration: "Kyōfu no Gasu Panikku" (Japanese: 恐怖のガスパニック)	Kiyosumi Fukazawa	Yasushi Hirano	June 11, 1980
12	"The Beautiful Transfer Student"; Transliteration: "Utsukushii Tenkōsei" (Japanese: 美しい転校生)	Kiyosumi Fukazawa	Jō Hirose	June 18, 1980
13	"Knockout! Formation Yamato!"; Transliteration: "Hissatsu! Fōmēshon Yamato" (Japanese: 必殺！ フォーメーション・ヤマト)	Noriaki Yuasa	Shosuke Ai	June 25, 1980
14	"Teleportation! The Man from Paris"; Transliteration: "Terepōtēshon! Pari kara Kita Otoko" (Japanese: テレポーテーション！ パリから来た男)	Noriaki Yuasa	Shosuke Ai	July 2, 1980
15	"The Demon Doctor's Laboratory"; Transliteration: "Akuma Hakase no Jikkenshitsu" (Japanese: 悪魔博士の実験室)	Jō Hirose	Shosuke Ai	July 9, 1980
16	"The Mysterious Snow Art from Space"; Transliteration: "Nazo no Uchū Buttai Sunō Āto" (Japanese: 謎の宇宙物体スノーアート)	Jō Hirose	Yasushi Hirano	July 16, 1980
17	"Fly to the Sinister Monster Island!!: Part 1"; Transliteration: "Ma no Kaijūjima e Tobe!! (Zenpen)" (Japanese: 魔の怪獣島へ飛べ!! 前編)	Noriaki Yuasa	Shosuke Ai	July 23, 1980
18	"Fly to the Sinister Monster Island!!: Part 2"; Transliteration: "Ma no Kaijūjima e Tobe!! (Kōhen)" (Japanese: 魔の怪獣島へ飛べ!! 後編)	Noriaki Yuasa	Shosuke Ai	July 30, 1980
19	"Order to Destroy the Rogue Star"; Transliteration: "Hagureboshi Bakuha Meirei" (Japanese: はぐれ星爆破命令)	Samaji Nonagase	Bunzo Wakatsuki	August 6, 1980
20	"Invasion!! The Bloodsucking Ball Army"; Transliteration: "Shūrai!! Kyūketsu Bōru Gundan" (Japanese: 襲来!! 吸血ボール軍団)	Samaji Nonagase	Tsutomu Tsukushi	August 13, 1980
21	"Shine into Eternity!! Space G-Men 85"; Transliteration: "Towa ni Kagayake!! Uchū Jīmen Hachijū-go" (Japanese: 永遠(とわ)に輝け！！ 宇宙Gメン85)	Noriaki Yuasa	Hiroyasu Yamaura	August 20, 1980
22	"The Day When the Planets Align"; Transliteration: "Wakusei ga Narabu Hi Nanika ga Okoru" (Japanese: 惑星が並ぶ日 なにかが起こる)	Noriaki Yuasa	Shosuke Ai	August 27, 1980
23	"S.O.S.!! Invasion of the Space Amoeba"; Transliteration: "Esu Ō Esu!! Uchū Amēba no Dai Shinryaku" (Japanese: SOS!! 宇宙アメーバの大侵略)	Tōru Toyama	Hiroyasu Yamaura	September 3, 1980
24	"The Planet of Traitorous Androids"; Transliteration: "Uragitta Andoroido no Hoshi" (Japanese: 裏切ったアンドロイドの星)	Tōru Toyama	Yasushi Hirano	September 10, 1980
25	"A Beautiful Challenger"; Transliteration: "Utsukushiki Charenjā" (Japanese: 美しきチャレンジャー)	Noriaki Yuasa	Shosuke Ai	September 17, 1980
26	"The Time Tunnel Shadow Warriors"; Transliteration: "Taimu Ton'neru no Kagemusha-tachi" (Japanese: タイムトンネルの影武者たち)	Noriaki Yuasa	Yasushi Hirano	September 24, 1980
27	"Terror of the White Devil"; Transliteration: "Shiroi Akuma no Kyōfu" (Japanese: 白い悪魔の恐怖)	Tōru Toyama	Ryū Minamikawa	October 1, 1980
28	"Lullaby of the Migratory Bird Monster"; Transliteration: "Wataridori Kaijū no Komoriuta" (Japanese: 渡り鳥怪獣の子守歌)	Tōru Toyama	Shosuke Ai	October 8, 1980
29	"Wrath of the Monster Emperor"; Transliteration: "Kaijū Teiō no Ikari" (Japanese: 怪獣帝王の怒り)	Noriaki Yuasa	Bunzo Wakatsuki	October 15, 1980
30	"A Friend Lost in the Desert"; Transliteration: "Sabaku ni Kieta Yūjin" (Japanese: 砂漠に消えた友人)	Noriaki Yuasa	Bunzo Wakatsuki	October 22, 1980
31	"The Monster Seeds Flew"; Transliteration: "Kaijū no Tane Tonda" (Japanese: 怪獣の種飛んだ)	Tōru Toyama	Shosuke Ai	October 29, 1980
32	"Monster Ship from the Dark Sea"; Transliteration: "Ankoku no Umi no Monsutā Shippu" (Japanese: 暗黒の海のモンスターシップ)	Tōru Toyama	Yasushi Hirano	November 5, 1980
33	"The Monster Made by a Boy"; Transliteration: "Shōnen ga Tsukutteshimatta Kaijū" (Japanese: 少年が作ってしまった怪獣)	Noriaki Yuasa	Shosuke Ai	November 12, 1980
34	"I Caught a Weird Fish!"; Transliteration: "Hentekorin na Sakana o Tsutta zo!" (Japanese: ヘンテコリンな魚を釣ったぞ！)	Noriaki Yuasa	Toshirō Ishidō	November 19, 1980
35	"The 99th Year Dragon God Festival"; Transliteration: "Kyūjū-kyū-nen-me no Ryūjinsai" (Japanese: 99年目の竜神祭)	Isamu Aizuki	Bunzo Wakatsuki	December 3, 1980
36	"Go for It! Stag Beetle Wintering Team"; Transliteration: "Ganbare! Kuwagata Ettōtai" (Japanese: がんばれ！ クワガタ越冬隊)	Isamu Aizuki	Toshirō Ishidō	December 10, 1980
37	"Alien Baltan's Terrifying Zoo Operation"; Transliteration: "Osoreteita Barutan Seijin no Dōbutsuen Sakusen" (Japanese: 怖れていたバルタン星人の動物園作戦)	Tōru Toyama	Toshirō Ishidō	December 17, 1980
38	"The Echoing Voice of Father of Ultra"; Transliteration: "Ōzora ni Hibike Urutora no Chichi no Koe" (Japanese: 大空にひびけ ウルトラの父の声)	Tōru Toyama	Bunzo Wakatsuki	December 24, 1980
39	"I'm a Monster You Guys!"; Transliteration: "Boku wa Kaijū dāi" (Japanese: ボクは怪獣だ～い)	Noriaki Yuasa	Yasushi Hirano	January 7, 1981
40	"The Sumo Boy from the Mountains"; Transliteration: "Yama kara Sumō Kozō ga Yattekita" (Japanese: 山からすもう小僧がやって来た)	Noriaki Yuasa	Matasaburō Mizusawa	January 14, 1981
41	"Don’t You Wanna See the Zero Fighter Bird Monster?"; Transliteration: "Kimi wa Zerosen Kaichō o Mitakunai kai?" (Japanese: 君はゼロ戦怪鳥を見たくないかい？)	Shōhei Tōjō	Toshirō Ishidō	January 21, 1981
42	"Wow! The Godness Kannon was Strong!"; Transliteration: "Sasuga! Kan'non-sama wa Tsuyokatta!" (Japanese: さすが！ 観音さまは強かった！)	Shōhei Tōjō	Toshirō Ishidō	January 28, 1981
43	"The Female Warrior from the Planet of Ultra"; Transliteration: "Urutora no Hoshi kara Tondekita On'na Senshi" (Japanese: ウルトラの星から飛んで来た女戦士)	Noriaki Yuasa	Matasaburō Mizusawa	February 4, 1981
44	"Fierce Fight! 80 vs. Ultraseven"; Transliteration: "Geki Faito! Eiti Tai Urutorasebun" (Japanese: 激ファイト！ 80vsウルトラセブン)	Noriaki Yuasa	Kōsuke Yoshida	February 11, 1981
45	"Alien Baltan's Endless Challenging Spirit"; Transliteration: "Barutan Seijin no Kagiri Naki Charenji Damashii" (Japanese: バルタン星人の限りなきチャレンジ魂)	Samaji Nonagase	Toshirō Ishidō	February 18, 1981
46	"Revival of the Fearsome Red King"; Transliteration: "Osoreteita Reddo Kingu no Fukkatsu Sengen" (Japanese: 恐れていたレッドキングの復活宣言)	Shōhei Tōjō	Yasushi Hirano	February 25, 1981
47	"Be Careful of the Evil Glove!!"; Transliteration: "Ma no Gurōbu Otoshimono ni Goyōjin!!" (Japanese: 魔のグローブ 落し物にご用心!!)	Shōhei Tōjō	Toshirō Ishidō	March 4, 1981
48	"The Speed Runner from Death Mountain"; Transliteration: "Shinigamiyama no Supīdo Ran'nā" (Japanese: 死神山のスピードランナー)	Kiyohiko Miyasaka	Matasaburō Mizusawa	March 11, 1981
49	"80's Greatest Pinch! Transform! Ultrawoman"; Transliteration: "Eiti Saidai no Pinchi! Henshin! On'na Urutoraman" (Japanese: 80最大のピンチ！ 変身！ 女ウルトラマン)	Kiyohiko Miyasaka	Hiroyasu Yamaura	March 18, 1981
50	"Ah! The Giraffes and Elephants All Turned to Ice!!"; Transliteration: "A! Kirin mo Zō mo Kōri ni Natta!!" (Japanese: あっ！ キリンも象も氷になった!!)	Kazuho Mitsuta	Toshirō Ishidō	March 25, 1981

== Cast ==
- Takeshi Yamato (矢的 猛, Yamato Takeshi), Ultraman 80 (Voice): Hatsunori Hasegawa (長谷川 初範, Hasegawa Hatsunori)
- Kazuki Ōyama (オオヤマ 一樹, Ōyama Kazuki): Jin Nakayama (中山 仁, Nakayama Jin)
- Junkichi Itō (イトウ 順吉, Itō Junkichi): Masaaki Daimon (大門 正明, Daimon Masaaki)
- Tokihiko Harada (ハラダ 時彦, Harada Tokihiko): Daisuke Musō (無双 大介, Musō Daisuke)
- Hiroshi Tajima (タジマ 浩, Tajima Hiroshi): Shūhei Nitta (新田 修平, Nitta Shūhei)
- Emi Jōno (城野 エミ, Jō'no Emi), Maihime (舞姫), Android Emi (アンドロイド・エミ, Andoroido Emi): Eri Ishida (石田 えり, Ishida Eri)
- Shinhachirō Fujimori (フジモリ 新八郎, Fujimori Shinhachirō): Masashi Furuta (古田 正志, Furuta Masashi)
- Noboru Ikeda (イケダ 登, Ikeda Noboru): Tatsuya Okamoto (岡本 達哉, Okamoto Tatsuya)
- Ryōko Hoshi (星 涼子, Hoshi Ryōko), Yullian (ユリアン, Yurian; Voice): Sayoko Hagiwara (萩原 佐代子, Hagiwara Sayoko)
- Teruo Sera (セラ 照夫, Sera Teruo): Akihiko Sugisaki (杉崎 昭彦, Sugisaki Akihiko)
- Non-chan (ノンちゃん), Yuriko Kosaka (小坂 ユリ子, Kosaka Yuriko): Noriko Shirasaka (白坂 紀子, Shirasaka Noriko)
- Kennosuke Hayashi (林 憲之助, Hayashi Ken'nosuke): Saburō Bōya (坊屋 三郎, Bōya Saburō)
- Kumi Nozaki (野崎 クミ, Nozaki Kumi): Ikuko Wada (和田 幾子, Wada Ikuko)
- Kyōko Aihara (相原 京子, Aihara Kyōko): Mayumi Asano (浅野 真弓, Asano Mayumi)
- Super (スーパー, Sūpā): Hirotomo Shimizu (清水 浩智, Shimizu Hirotomo)
- Fashion (ファッション, Fasshon): Midori Kuno (久野 みどり, Kuno Midori)
- Rakugo (落語): Junichi Kitai (鍛代 順一, Kitai Jun'ichi)
- Professor (ハカセ, Hakase): Ikumi Ueno (上野 郁巳, Ueno Ikumi)
- Narrator: Shiro Suzuki (鈴木 史朗, Suzuki Shirō; 1-13), Yūsaku Yara (屋良 有作, Yara Yūsaku; 14-50)

== Songs ==
Opening themes

- "Ultraman 80" (ウルトラマン80, Urutoraman Eiti)
  - Lyrics: Michio Yamagami (山上 路夫, Yamagami Michio)
  - Composition & Arrangement: Noboru Kimura (木村 昇, Kimura Noboru)
  - Artist: TALIZMAN
  - Episodes: 1-39
- Ganbare Ultraman 80 (がんばれウルトラマン80, Ganbare Urutoraman Eiti; lit. "Hang in There, Ultraman 80")
  - Lyrics: Michio Yamagami
  - Composition & Arrangement: Noboru Kimura
  - Artist: TALIZMAN, Columbia Yurikago Kai (コロムビアゆりかご会, Koromubia Yurikago Kai)
  - Episodes: 40-50

Ending themes

- "Let's Go UGM" (レッツ・ゴー・UGM, Rettsu Gō Yū Jī Emu)
  - Lyrics: Michio Yamagami
  - Composition & Arrangement: Noboru Kimura
  - Artist: TALIZMAN
  - Episodes: 1-39
- "Chikyūjin da yo" (地球人だよ; lit. "You Are Earthlings")
  - Lyrics: Michio Yamagami
  - Composition & Arrangement: Noboru Kimura
  - Artist: TALIZMAN, Columbia Yurikago Kai
  - Episodes: 40-49

Insert theme

- "Kokoro o Moyasu Aitsu -Yamato Takeshi no Uta-" (心を燃やすあいつ -矢的猛の歌-; lit. "That Guy Burning the Heart -Song of Takeshi Yamato-")
  - Lyrics: Kazuho Mitsuta (満田 かずほ, Mitsuta Kazuho)
  - Composition: Tōru Fuyuki (冬木 透, Fuyuki Tōru)
  - Arrangement: Masahisa Takeichi (武市 昌久, Takeichi Masahisa)
  - Artist: Kōji Numata (ぬまた こうじ, Numata Kōji)
  - Episodes: 50

== Home media ==
In 2014, the series was released on Crunchyroll, and later released on the streaming service Toku in 2017.

In July 2020, Shout! Factory announced to have struck a multi-year deal with Alliance Entertainment and Mill Creek Entertainment, with the blessings of Tsuburaya and Indigo, that granted them the exclusive SVOD and AVOD digital rights to the Ultra series and films (1,100 TV episodes and 20 films) acquired by Mill Creek the previous year. Ultraman 80, amongst other titles, will stream in the United States and Canada through Shout! Factory TV and Tokushoutsu.

It was released in the United States on DVD September 14, 2021 by Mill Creek Entertainment.

== Other appearances ==
- Ultraman Story, Ultraman Zoffy: Ultra Warriors vs. the Giant Monster Army and Ultraman vs. Kamen Rider: stock footage appearances
- Ultraman Mebius
- Mega Monster Battle: Ultra Galaxy and Ultraman Zero: The Revenge of Belial: see here
- Ultraman Retsuden
- Ultraman Geed: see here
