= Dai Sentai Goggle-V =

Television series

- Title Screen
- Genre: Tokusatsu; Superhero fiction Science fiction Fantasy
- Created by: Toei Company
- Developed by: Hirohisa Soda
- Directed by: Shohei Tojo; Takafumi Hattori; Makoto Tsuji; Minoru Yamada; Michio Konishi
- Starring: Ryōji Akagi; Jyunichi Haruta; Shigeki Ishii; Sanpei Godai; Megumi Ōkawa; Mayumi Yoshida; Toshimichi Takahashi; Yosuke Naka
- Narrated by: Tōru Ōhira
- Composer: Michiaki Watanabe
- Country of origin: Japan
- No. of episodes: 50 (list of episodes)

Production
- Producers: Moriyoshi Katō; Takeyuki Suzuki
- Running time: 30 minutes
- Production companies: TV Asahi; Toei Company; Toei Advertising

Original release
- Network: ANN (TV Asahi)
- Release: February 6, 1982 – January 29, 1983

Related
- Taiyo Sentai Sun Vulcan; Kagaku Sentai Dynaman

Dai Sentai Goggle-V (大戦隊ゴーグルファイブ, Dai Sentai Gōguru Faibu; Great Squadron Goggle-V) is a Japanese television tokusatsu series broadcast by TV Asahi. The series is the sixth installment of Super Sentai. Directed by Shohei Tojo, Takafumi Hattori, Makoto Tsuji, Minoru Yamada and Michio Konishi, it stars Ryōji Akagi, Jyunichi Haruta, Shigeki Ishii, Sanpei Godai, Megumi Ōkawa, Mayumi Yoshida, Toshimichi Takahashi and Yosuke Naka. It aired from February 6, 1982 to January 29, 1983, replacing Taiyo Sentai Sun Vulcan and was replaced by Kagaku Sentai Dynaman. Its international English title as listed by Toei is simply Goggle V.

== Plot ==
The Dark Science Empire Deathdärk launches its scheme for world conquest from their Deathtopia Castle in Wolfborg Castle, Germany. Dr. Hideki Hongo, the founder of the Future Science Laboratory, is saved from one of their attacks by world-class explorer Kenichi Akama. Using his Computer Boys & Girls, Hongo recruits five people, including Kenichi, to form the Dai Sentai Goggle-V (Goggle 5), the only force capable of stopping Deathdärk.

== Characters ==
=== Goggle-V ===
The eponymous Goggle-V is a team that was recruited and formed by the Future Science Laboratory to combat the Dark Science Empire Deathdärk. Their battle phrase is "Fight! Dai Sentai Goggle-V!" (戦え！大戦隊ゴーグルファイブ！, Tatakae! Dai Sentai Gōguru Faibu!). Like Denziman, their surnames include their color.

- Kenichi Akama (赤間 健一, Akama Ken'ichi)/Goggle Red (ゴーグルレッド, Gōguru Reddo): A world class explorer and mountain climber, aged 22. By saving Dr. Hongo from Deathdärk's Madaramen, he came to realize what danger the world was in. His forehead jewel is the ruby (it has the lowest roll call pitch), symbolizing Atlantis. His rhythmic gymnastic apparatus is the rope. Kenichi appeared in Hyakujuu Sentai Gaoranger vs. Super Sentai along with his 23 fellow Red Warriors. He is also the team's leader.
- Kanpei Kuroda (黒田 官平, Kuroda Kanpei)/Goggle Black (ゴーグルブラック, Gōguru Burakku): The president of the shogi club at Touto University, aged 26. He is second in-command and he specializes in strategy. Normally a janitor at Korakuen Stadium (replaced by the Tokyo Dome after the series ended). His forehead jewel is the emerald (second lowest pitch), symbolizing Asia, specifically Angkor Wat. His rhythmic gymnastic apparatus is the clubs.
- Saburo Aoyama (青山 三郎, Aoyama Saburō)/Goggle Blue (ゴーグルブルー, Gōguru Burū): An ice hockey player and would-be inventor, aged 20. He develops a friendship with Futoshi Kijima. He is also good with children. His forehead jewel is the sapphire (middle pitch), symbolizing Egypt. His rhythmic gymnastic apparatus is the hoop.
- Futoshi Kijima (黄島 太, Kijima Futoshi)/Goggle Yellow (ゴーグルイエロー, Gōguru Ierō): He works at a zoo and he is the comedic one of the group. Futoshi is the oldest at 27. His forehead jewel is the opal (second highest pitch), symbolizing Mu (Lemuria). His rhythmic gymnastic apparatus is the ball.
- Miki Momozono (桃園ミキ, Momozono Miki)/Goggle Pink (ゴーグルピンク, Gōguru Pinku): A gymnast who works as an announcer at Kourakuen Stadium. Miki is the youngest at 16, but is very mature for her age. Her forehead jewel is the diamond (highest pitch), symbolizing the Maya and Inca. Her rhythmic gymnastics apparatus is the ribbon.

==== Mecha ====
- Goggle Caesar (ゴーグルシーザー, Gōguru Shīzā): The flying fortress that is launched from a pad beneath Kourakuen Stadium, launches three numbered carriers which contain the components of the Goggle Robo. It is driven by Goggle Black and Goggle Pink to aid the Goggle Robo in battle. It shoots missiles from its "mouth".
  - Goggle Containers (ゴーグルコンテナ, Gōguru Kontena): Three remote controlled carrier pods carried by the Goggle Caesar. The Goggle Jet is carried by Goggle Container 1, the Goggle Tank by Goggle Container 2, and the Goggle Dump by Goggle Container 3.
- Goggle Robo (ゴーグルロボ, Gōguru Robo): A giant robot that is composed of three giant vehicles that combine when the command "Go! Go! Change!" is given. It wields the Earth Sword, which finishes off the Kong by using its Electron Galaxy Slash.
  - Goggle Jet (ゴーグルジェット, Gōguru Jetto): The mecha of Goggle Red. It is stored in Goggle Container 1, with wings retracted. It forms the head and chest of the Goggle Robo. It can shoot down Desfighters, but Goggle Red can also use its speed to outmaneuver them. Since it is a jet, it can take off while the Goggle Caesar is still airborne.
  - Goggle Tank (ゴーグルタンク, Gōguru Tanku): The mecha of Goggle Blue. It attacks with retractable missile launcher. It forms the arms and back of the Goggle Robo.
  - Goggle Dump (ゴーグルダンプ, Gōguru Danpu): The mecha of Goggle Yellow. It has a rectangular cavity in the back. It forms the legs of the Goggle Robo.

=== Future Science Laboratory ===
- Dr. Hideki Hongo (本郷 秀樹博士, Hongō Hideki-hakase): A 45-year-old scientist who works for the Future Science Laboratory and he is the founder of Goggle-V.
- Midori Wakagi (若木 みどり, Wakagi Midori): The assistant of Dr. Hongo. Even after the doctor leaves, she remains in a research institute, and Goggle-V is supported with Sayuri.
- Sayuri Yamamoto (山本 さゆり, Yamamoto Sayuri): The assistant of Dr. Hongo. Even after the doctor leaves, she remains in a research institute, and Goggle-V is supported with Midori.
- Computer Boys and Girls / Comboy (コンピューターボーイズ＆ガールズ / コンボイ, Konpyūtā Bōizu Ando Gāruzu / Konboi): Five children in blue tights who comprise the Junior Goggle 5 and support the team proper w/ the Comboyputer. Each follows a specific team member:
  - Tatsuya Ueda (上田 達也, Ueda Tatsuya) (Red, 12 years old)
  - Makoto Takenaka (竹中 誠, Takenaka Makoto) (Black, 10 years old)
  - Haruo Shimada (島田 春男, Shimada Haruo) (Blue, 8 years old)
  - Daisuke Oyama (大山 大助, Ōyama Daisuke) (Yellow, 10 years old)
  - Akane Aizawa (相沢 あかね, Aizawa Akane) (Pink, 12 years old)

=== Dark Science Empire Deathdärk ===
From the time when iron was discovered in ancient Turkey, the Dark Science Empire Deathdärk (暗黒科学帝国デスダーク, Ankoku Kagaku Teikoku Desudāku) have existed to move the world in the shadows. United by Führer Taboo, they are based from the Dark Giant Castle Deathtopia (暗黒巨大城デストピア, Ankoku Kyodaijō Desutopia) that launches giant robots from its gate. It is usually underwater, but it can fly. When in flight, its high-power propulsion winds wreak destructive chaos underneath.

- Führer Taboo (総統タブー, Sōtō Tabū): A one-eyed "super gene" product of genetic engineering that hides behind a translucent wall. He is merciless and unforgiving and seeks to reform the Earth in his image. During the final episode, Goggle Red attacked him in one on one battle thrusting him thus revealing the monster he really was in the process behind his translucent wall. When the Deathtopia was destroyed, he finally appeared in giant form hoping to destroy the Goggle-V. He was ultimately destroyed by the Goggle Robo with the eye-poking Earth Sword Electron Galaxy Missile when the default final attack did not work on him.
- Grand Marshal Deathmark (デスマルク大元帥, Desumaruku-daigensui): A Pharaoh-like commander brought back to life by Taboo. He executed both Iguana and Zazoriya to reorganize Deathdärk as Führer Taboo ordered him to. Grand Marshal Deathmark was the last to be destroyed before the emergence of Führer Taboo with Goggle Golden Spear.
- General Deathgiller (デスギラー将軍, Desugirā-shōgun): A swordsman field commander in black. He is rivals with Goggle Red and close allies with Mazurka. However he betrayed Mazurka by trying to use her as a bomb. However Mazurka was able to counter and the base exploded along with him. However he was found alive and nursed back to health by the Goggle-V team until he was well to fight with them again. He showed no gratitude to the enemy by revealing the location of their new hiding place to Deathmark, however with the excuse of paying his debt to the Goggle V for saving him, he protects them from Bear Moozoo. He piloted the last of the Kongs, Bear Kong before his death after the defeat of Bear Mozoo which he threatened Deathmark in the process to use the robot.
- Mazurka (マズルカ, Mazuruka): The first female field commander introduced who wields the Dark Sword Black Thunder sword. She serves Deathdärk faithfully and with extreme fierceness against those who oppose Deathdärk. She dies when showered with the powerful Hightron energy that makes her invisible and intangible while draining her life force considerably. Mazura was expected to die from the process and the necklace given to her by Deathdärk would explode for in reality it was a bomb. She took the control from Deathgiller and set the bomb to try to destroy Deathgiller, but failed.
- Dr. Zazoriya (ザゾリヤ博士, Zazoriya-hakase): A Deathdärk scientist dressed in a scorpion-like outfit who builds mecha-motif robots. An occasional rival of Doctor Iguana. She was put to death by Deathmark.
- Dr. Iguana (イガアナ博士, Igaana-hakase): A Deathdärk scientist dressed in an iguana-like outfit who builds beast-motif robots. He was put to death by Deathmark.
- Bella (べラ, Bera) & Beth (べス, Besu): The faceless warriors in purple and blue who can assume human forms. They are the twin handmaidens of Deathmark. Were fight as two young feisty girl warriors. They were destroyed alongside Deathmark.
- Madaramen (マダラマン, Madaraman): The android foot soldiers in camouflage-colored tights.

==== Mozoos ====
The Mozoos (モズー, Mozū) are a fusion of an animal/plant genes and metal atoms.

- Seashell Mozoo (カイモズー, Kai Mozū): A mollusk-themed Mozoo.
- Bird Mozoo (トリモズー, Tori Mozū): A bird-themed Mozoo.
- Octopus Mozoo (タコモズー, Tako Mozū): An octopus-themed Mozoo.
- Spider Mozoo (クモモズー, Kumo Mozū): A spider-themed Mozoo.
- Mantis Mozoo (カマキリモズー, Kamakiri Mozū): A mantis-themed Mozoo.
- Gecko Mozoo (ヤモリモズー, Yamori Mozū): A tokay gecko-themd Mozoo.
- Mole Mozoo (モグラモズー, Mogura Mozū): A mole-themed Mozoo that appeared in Dai Sentai Google-V: The Movie.
- Cat Mozoo (ネコモズー, Neko Mozū): A cat-themed Mozoo.
- Moth Mozoo (ドクガモズー, Dokuga Mozū): A moth-themed Mozoo.
- Baku Mozoo (バクモズー, Baku Mozū): A Baku-themed Mozoo.
- Mouse Mozoo (ネズミモズー, Nezumi Mozū): A mouse-themed Mozoo.
- Lion Mozoo (シシモズー, Shishi Mozū): A Chinese guardian lion-themed Mozoo.
- Antlion Mozoo (アリジゴクモズー, Arijigoku Mozū): An antlion-themed Mozoo.
- Catfish Mozoo (ナマズモズー, Namazu Mozū): A catfish-themed Mozoo used by Dr. Iguana.
- Angler Mozoo (アンコウモズー, Ankō Mozū): An anglerfish-themed Mozoo used by Dr. Iguana and Dr. Zazoriya.
- Bee Mozoo (ハチモズー, Hachi Mozū): A bee-themed Mozoo used by Dr. Iguana and Dr. Zazoriya.
- Kappa Mozoo (カッパモズー, Kappa Mozū): A Kappa-themed Mozoo.
- Monkey Mozoo (サルモズー, Saru Mozū): A monkey-themed Mozoo.
- Bat Mozoo (コウモリモズー, Kōmori Mozū): A bat-themed Mozoo.
- Cactus Mozoo (サボテンモズー, Saboten Mozū): A cactus-themed Mozoo.
- Coelacanth Mozoo (シーラカンスモズー, Shīrakansu Mozū): A coelacanth-themed Mozoo.
- Peacock Mozoo (クジャクモズー, Kujaku Mozū): A peacock-themed Mozoo.
- Crab Mozoo (カニモズー, Kani Mozū): A crab-themed Mozoo.
- Chameleon Mozoo (カメレオンモズー, Kamereon Mozū): A chameleon-themed Mozoo.
- Pterano Mozoo (テラノモズー, Terano Mozū): A Pteranodon-themed Mozoo.
- Boar Mozoo (イノシシモズー, Inoshishi Mozū): A wild boar-themed Mozoo.
- Watermelon Mozoo (スイカモズー, Suika Mozū): A watermelon-themed Mozoo.
- Shark Mozoo (サメモズー, Same Mozū): A shark-themed Mozoo.
- Fly Mozoo (ハエモズー, Hae Mozū): A fly-themed Mozoo.
- Tengu Mozoo (テングモズー, Tengu Mozū): A Tengu-themed Mozoo.
- Rattlesnake Mozoo (ガラガラヘビモズー, Garagarahebi Mozū): A rattlesnake-themed Mozoo.
- Hermit Crab Mozoo (ヤドカリモズー, Yadokari Mozū): A hermit crab-themed Mozoo.
- Tiger Mozoo (トラモズー, Tora Mozū): A tiger/Smilodon-themed Mozoo.

===== Super Synthetic Beasts =====
The Super Synthetic Beasts (超合成怪獣, Chō Goseijū) are a new version of the Synthetic Beasts that are made out of neo-metal.

- Crocodile Mozoo (ワニモズー, Wani Mozū): A crocodile-themed Mozoo.
- Hyena Mozoo (ハイエナモズー, Haiena Mozū): A hyena-themed Mozoo.
- Porcupine Mozoo (ヤマアラシモズー, Yamārashi Mozū): A porcupine-themed Mozoo.
- Flying Squirrel Mozoo (ムササビモズー, Musasabi Mozū): A flying squirrel-themed Mozoo.
- Rhino Mozoo (サイモズー, Sai Mozū): A rhinoceros-themed Mozoo.
- Horned Owl Mozoo (ミミズクモズー, Mimizuku Mozū): A horned owl-themed Mozoo.
- Walrus Mozoo (セイウチモズー, Seiuchi Mozū): A walrus-themed Mozoo.
- Silkworm Mozoo (カイコモズー, Kaiko Mozū): A silkworm-themed Mozoo.
- Scorpion Mozoo (サソリモズー, Sasori Mozū): A scorpion-themed Mozoo.
- Earthworm Mozoo (ミミズモズー, Mimizu Mozū): An earthworm-themed Mozoo.
- Condor Mozoo (コンドルモズー, Kondoru Mozū): A condor-themed Mozoo.
- Tanuki Mozoo (タヌキモズー, Tanuki Mozū): A drum-bellied Tanuki-themed Mozoo.
- Skunk Mozoo (スカンクモズー, Sukanku Mozū): A skunk-themed Mozoo.

===== Hightron Synthetic Beasts =====
The following Synthetic Beasts were equipped with a Hightron device that enhances their powers after an experimental energy was seized by Dark Science Empire Deathdärk:

- Giant Tortoise Mozoo (ゾウガメモズー, Zōkame Mozū): A giant tortoise-themed Mozoo.
- Cheetah Mozoo (チーターモズー, Chītā Mozū): A cheetah-themed Mozoo.
- Bear Mozoo (クマモズー, Kuma Mozū): An Asian black bear-themed Mozoo.

==== Kongs ====
The Kongs (コング, Kongu) are giant robot versions of the Synthetic Beasts. When a Mozoo is defeated, a Kong is dispatched to re-energize it as the Mozoo pilots the Kong to fight the Goggle Robo.

- Fan Kong (ファンコン, Fan Kongu): A fan-themed Kong that was dispatched by Dr. Zazoriya and Dr. Iguana and piloted by Seashell Mozoo.
- Light Kong (ヒカリコン, Hikari Kongu): A light-themed Kong that was dispatched by Dr. Zazoriya and Dr. Iguana and piloted by Bird Mozoo.
- Gorilla Kong (ゴリラコング, Gorira Kongu): A gorilla-themed Kong that was dispatched by Dr. Zazoriya and Dr. Iguana and piloted by Octopus Mozoo.
- Mammoth Kong (マンモスコン, Manmosu Kongu): A mammoth-themed Kong that was dispatched by Dr. Zazoriya and Dr. Iguana and piloted by Spider Mozoo.
- Mantis Kong (カマキリコン, Kamakiri Kongu): A mantis-themed Kong that was piloted by Mantis Mozoo.
- Gecko Kong (ゲッコーコング, Gekkō Kongu): A tokay gecko-themed Kong that was piloted by Gecko Mozoo.
- Mole Kong (モールコング, Mōru Kongu): A mole-themed Kong that was piloted by Mole Mozoo in Dai Sentai Goggle-V: The Movie.
- Cat Kong (キャットコング, Neko Kongu): A cat-themed Kong that was piloted by Mole Mozoo.
- Moth Kong (モスコング, Dokuga Kongu): A moth-themed Kong that was piloted by Moth Mozoo.
- Baku Kong (バクーコング, Bakū Kongu): A Baku-themed Kong that was piloted by Baku Mozoo.
- Mouse Kong (マウスコング, Nezumi Kongu): A mouse-themed Kong that was piloted by Mouse Mozoo.
- Lion Kong (ライオンキング, Shishi Kongu): A Chinese guardian lion-themed Kong that was piloted by Lion Mozoo.
- Antlion Kong (アントライオンコング, Arijigoku Kongu): An antlion-themed Kong that was piloted by Antlion Mozoo.
- Catfish Mozoo (ナマズコング, Namazu Kongu): A catfish-themed Kong that was piloted by Antlion Mozoo.
- Angler Kong (アングラーコング, Anko Kongu): An anglerfish-themed Kong that was piloted by Angler Mozoo.
- Bee Kong (ビーコング, Hachi Kongu): A bee-themed Kong that was piloted by Bee Mozoo.
- Kappa Kong (カッパコング, Kappa Kongu): A Kappa-themed Kong that was piloted by Kappa Mozoo.
- Monkey Kong (モンキーコング, Saru Kongu): A monkey-themed Kong that was piloted by Monkey Mozoo.
- Bat Kong (バットコング, Kōmori Kongu): A bat-themed Kong that was piloted by Bat Mozoo.
- Cactus Kong (カクタスコング, Saboten Kongu): A cactus-themed Kong that was piloted by Cactus Mozoo.
- Coelacanth Kong (シーラカンス・コング, Shīrakansu Kongu): A coelacanth-themed Kong that was piloted by Coelacanth Mozoo.
- Peacock Kong (ピーコックコング, Kujaku Kongu): A peacock-themed Kong that was piloted by Peacock Mozoo.
- Crab Kong (クラブコング, Kani Kongu): A crab-themed Kong that was piloted by Crab Mozoo.
- Chameleon Kong (カメレオンコング, Kamereon Kongu): A chameleon-themed Kong that was piloted by Chameleon Mozoo.
- Pterano Kong (プテラノコング, Terano Kongu): A Pteranodon-themed Kong that was piloted by Pterano Mozoo.
- Boar Kong (イノシシコング, Inoshishi Kongu): A wild boar-themed Kong that was piloted by Boar Mozoo.
- Watermelon Kong (スイカコング, Suika Kongu): A watermelon-themed Kong that was piloted by Watermelon Mozoo.
- Shark Kong (シャークコング, Same Kongu): A shark-themed Kong that was piloted by Shark Mozoo.
- Fly Kong (フライコング, Hae Kongu): A fly-themed Kong that was piloted by Shark Mozoo.
- Tengu Kong (天狗コング, Tengu Kongu): A Tengu-themed Kong that was piloted by Tengu Mozoo.
- Rattlesnake Kong (ガラガラヘビコング, Garagarahebi Kongu): A rattlesnake-themed Kong that was piloted by Rattlesnake Mozoo.
- Hermit Crab Kong (ヤドカリコング, Yadokari Kongu): A hermit crab-themed Kong that was piloted by Hermit Crab Mozoo.
- Tiger Kong (タイガーキング, Tora Kongu): A tiger/Smilodon-themed Kong that was piloted by Tiger Mozoo.
- Crocodile Kong (クロコダイルコング, Wani Kongu): A crocodile-themed Kong that was piloted by Crocodile Mozoo.
- Hyena Kong (ハイエナ・コング, Haiena Kongu): A hyena-themed Kong that was piloted by Hyena Mozoo.
- Porcupine Kong (ポーキュパイン・コング, Yamārashi Kongu): A porcupine-themed Kong that was piloted by Porcupine Mozoo.
- Flying Squirrel Kong (ムササビコング, Musasabi Kongu): A flying squirrel-themed Kong that was piloted by Flying Squirrel Mozoo.
- Rhino Kong (ライノコング, Sai Kongu): A rhinoceros-themed Kong that was piloted by Rhino Mozoo.
- Horned Owl Kong (ミミズクコング, Mimizuki Kongu): A horned owl-themed Kong that was piloted by Horned Owl Mozoo.
- Walrus Kong (セイウチコング, Seiuchi Kongu): A walrus-themed Kong that was piloted by Walrus Mozoo.
- Silkworm Kong (シルクワームコング, Kaiko Kongu): A silkworm-themed Kong that was piloted by Silkworm Mozoo.
- Scorpion Kong (スコーピオンキング, Sasori Kongu): A scorpion-themed Kong that was piloted by Scorpion Mozoo.
- Earthworm Kong (アースワームコング, Mimizu Kongu): An earthworm-themed Kong that was piloted by Earthworm Mozoo.
- Condor Kong (コンドルコング, Kondoru Kongu): A condor-themed Kong that was piloted by Condor Mozoo.
- Tanuki Kong (タヌキコング, Tanuki Kongu): A drum-bellied Tanuki-themed Kong that was piloted by Tanuki Mozoo.
- Skunk Kong (スカンクコング, Sukanku Kongu): A skunk-themed Kong that was piloted by Skunk Mozoo.
- Giant Tortoise Kong (巨大な亀コング, Zōkame Kongu): A giant tortoise-themed Kong that was piloted by Giant Tortoise Mozoo.
- Cheetah Kong (チーターコング, Chītā Kongu): A cheetah-themed Kong that was piloted by Cheetah Mozoo.
- Bear Kong (ベアコング, Kuma Kongu): An Asian black bear-themed Kong that was piloted by General Deathgiller.

== Episodes ==
1. The Invasion of Dark Science (暗黒科学の来襲, Ankoku Kagaku no Raishū)
2. Rise up! Warriors of the Future (起て！未来の戦士, Tate! Mirai no Senshi)
3. Attack Deathtopia (デストピアを撃て, Desutopia o Ute)
4. Swelling Dark Land Mines (ムクムク暗黒地雷, Mukumuku Ankoku Jirai)
5. The Legend Where a Devil Lurks (悪魔がひそむ昔話, Akuma ga Hisomu Mukashibanashi)
6. The Love of a Villainous Wrestler (悪役レスラーの愛, Akuyaku Resurā no Ai)
7. Papa is Turned into a Ghost (幽霊になったパパ, Yūrei ni Natta Papa)
8. The Targeted Beautiful Professor (狙われた美人博士, Nerawareta Bijin Hakase)
9. The Village of the Hell Mushroom (地獄のキノコ村, Jigoku no Kinoko Mura)
10. The Secret of the Rare Pomato (珍種ポマトの秘密, Chinshu Pomato no Himitsu)
11. The Terrifying Magma Strategy (恐怖のマグマ作戦, Kyōfu no Maguma Sakusen)
12. The Sandpit Which Emerged from a Lie (嘘から出た砂地獄, Uso Kara Deta Suna Jigoku)
13. The Greatly Riotous Underground Catfish (大暴れ地底ナマズ, Ōabare Chitei Namazu)
14. It's Serious! The Earth is Sinking (大変だ！地球沈没, Taihen Da! Chikyū Chinbotsu)
15. The Revived Demonic Commander-in-Chief (甦る悪魔の大元帥, Yomigaeru Akuma no Daigensui)
16. Red! Close Call (レッド！危機一髪, Reddo! Kikiippatsu)
17. The Tears of the Kappa Boy (カッパ少年の涙, Kappa Shōnen no Namida)
18. The Day the Adults Disappeared (大人が消える日, Otona ga Kieru Hi)
19. The Secret of the Haunted House (お化け屋敷の秘密, Obakeyashiki no Himitsu)
20. The Flower of Death: Poison Cactus (死の花毒サボテン, Shi no Hana Doku Saboten)
21. Fear! The Fish are Fossilizing (恐怖！魚が化石に, Kyōfu! Sakana ga Kaseki ni)
22. Attack of the Cursed Dolls! (呪い人形の攻撃！, Noroi Ningyō no Kōgeki!)
23. The Great Soap Bubble Plan (シャボン玉大作戦, Shabondama Dai Sakusen)
24. Defeat the Unseen Enemy (見えない敵を倒せ, Mienai Teki o Taose)
25. The Dinosaur is the Messenger of the Devil (恐竜は悪魔の使者, Kyōryū wa Akuma no Shisha)
26. Black! Great Reversal (ブラック！大逆転, Burakku! Dai Gyakuten)
27. The Human Jungle! (人間ジャングル！, Ningen Janguru!)
28. The Revived Dead Mozoos (甦った亡霊モズー, Yomigaetta Bōrei Mozū)
29. Terror of the Sleeping Quarter (眠りの街の恐怖, Nemuri no Machi no Kyōfu)
30. The Golden Demon Sword of Inawashiro (猪苗代の黄金魔剣, Inawashiro no Ōgon Maken)
31. Blue! Great Assault! (ブルー！大突撃!, Burū! Dai Totsugeki!)
32. Startling Boneless Humans (ドキッ骨ぬき人間, Dokihhone-nuki Ningen)
33. Great Explosion of Caesae?! (シーザー大爆破？！, Shīzā Dai Bakuha?!)
34. It Came Forth! Golden Finishing Move (出た！黄金必殺技, Deta! Ōgon Hissatsu-waza)
35. Attack of the Iron-Eating Humans (鉄喰い人間の襲撃, Tetsu-kui Ningen no Shūgeki)
36. Shoot-Out! 0.3 Seconds! (決闘！0・3秒！, Kettō! Rei ten San byō!)
37. Attack the Mysterious Bomber (謎の爆撃機を撃て, Nazo no Bakugekiki o Ute)
38. The Attack of Friendship! (友情のアタック！, Yūjō no Atakku!)
39. The Demonic Man-Eating Picture Books (悪魔の人食い絵本, Akuma no Hitokui Ehon)
40. The Secret Base is in Danger (秘密基地が危ない, Himitsu Kichi ga Abunai)
41. The Great Adventure of a Transformed Papa (変身パパの大冒険, Henshin Papa no Daibōken)
42. Assassination! The Snare of the Scorpion (暗殺！サソリの罠, Ansatsu! Sasori no Wana)
43. Fight to the Death! The Koban Struggle (死闘！小判争奪戦, Shitō! Koban Sōdatsusen)
44. Oh! Food Turns into Sand (あ！食べ物が砂に, A! Tabemono ga Suna ni)
45. Two Blacks! (二人のブラック！, Futari no Burakku!)
46. Super Energy Arrival (超エネルギー出現, Chō Enerugī Shutsugen)
47. This is the Ultimate Weapon (これが最終兵器だ, Kore ga Saishū Heiki Da)
48. The Last Day of the Secret Base (秘密基地最後の日, Himitsu Kichi Saigo no Hi)
49. General! The Final Challenge (将軍！最後の挑戦, Shōgun! Saigo no Chōsen)
50. Proceed! To the Shining Future (進め！輝く未来へ, Susume! Kagayaku Mirai e)

== Cast ==
- Kenichi Akama: Ryōji Akagi
- Kanpei Kuroda: Jyunichi Haruta
- Saburo Aoyama: Shigeki Ishii
- Futoshi Kijima: Sanpei Godai
- Miki Momozono: Megumi Ōkawa
- Dr. Hideki Hongo: Noboru Nakaya
- Midori Wakagi: Itsuko Kobayashi
- Sayuri Yamamoto: Chieko Hosoya
- Tatsuya Ueda: Hidenori Iura
- Makoto Takenaka: Minoru Takeuchi
- Haruo Shimada: Kazuhiko Ōhara
- Daisuke Oyama: Tomonori Mizuno
- Akane Aizawa: Hanae Sugimoto
- Führer Taboo (Voice): Eisuke Yoda
- Grand Marshal Deathmark: Yohsuke Naka
- General Deathgiller: Toshimichi Takahashi
- Mazurka: Mayumi Yoshida (not the same Mayumi Yoshida, the actress who played Lou/Pink Flash from Choushinsei Flashman)
- Dr. Zazoriya: Kumiko Nishiguchi
- Dr. Iguana: Eiichi Kikuchi
- Bella: Mariko Ōki (15–27), Noriko Nakanishi (28–50)
- Beth: Kumiko Shinbo
- Narrator: Tōru Ōhira
- Goggle Robo: Shinji Nakae

== Songs ==
Opening theme

- "Dai Sentai Goggle-V" (大戦隊ゴーグルV, Dai Sentai Gōguru Faibu)
  - Lyrics: Kazuo Koike
  - Composition & Arrangement: Michiaki Watanabe
  - Artist: MoJo, Koorogi '73, The Chirps

Ending theme

- "Stop The Battle" (ストップ・ザ・バトル, Sutoppu Za Batoru)
  - Lyrics: Kazuo Koike
  - Composition & Arrangement: Michiaki Watanabe
  - Artist: MoJo

== International broadcast and home video ==
- In its home country of Japan, Toei Video released the series on DVD from September 21, 2006, to January 21, 2007, making it the first time this series received a home video release in some way. It was released throughout five volumes and each volume contains 10 episodes on 2 discs. Six selected episodes are included on the "Super Sentai Ichigo Blu-ray 1982 - 1986" Blu-Ray package released on April 14, 2021. The movie versions are the DVD-BOX "Super Sentai THE MOVIE BOX" was released on July 21, 2003, as under: "Super Sentai THE MOVIE VOl.2" and "Super Sentai THE MOVIE Blu-Ray BOX 1976-1995."
- In the Philippines, Google V was aired in BBC-2 from 1985 to 1986 with English dub and it also re-aired on RPN from 1998 to 1999 with a Filipino dub.
- In Italy, the series was broadcast in Italia 7 in the mid-1980s with an Italian dub and re-broadcast during the Power Rangers' boom in the country. This along with Denshi Sentai Denjiman were the only two Sentai shows to be broadcast with Italian dubs in the country.
- In Brazil, the series made its debut on Rede Bandeirantes in March 1990, licensed by Oro Filmes, following the success of Dengeki Sentai Changeman and Choushinsei Flashman in the previous decade. It also aired on Rede Record in 1993 and also TV Guaíba (now RecordTV RS). It aired as "Goggle Five - Os Guerreiros do Espaço" (Dai Sentai was dubbed as "Gigantes Guerreiros", literally, "Giant Warriors"), acquired from the Italian version as they have decided to go backwards and dub an older Sentai series to compete. But it didn't reach anywhere near the same popularity as what Changeman and Flashman previously had there. This was the third Sentai series to air in the region, followed by Hikari Sentai Maskman.
- The series was popular in Indonesia during the mid-1980s. It was the very first Super Sentai series to be aired in the region and was shown with an Indonesian dub. The series was readily available in VHS and Betamax format for rental during that time. All episodes were released and spread through 13 volume cassettes there. Goggle V was so famous, it was the only Super Sentai with a live stage show in Jakarta.
- Goggle-V was the third Sentai series being broadcast in Thailand and the first series for Channel 9 (now Channel 9 MCOT HD). It aired Saturdays and Sundays morning around 1986 in Thai dubbed version, with the voice acting led by Nirun Boonyarattaphan.
- The series aired in South Korea with a Korean dub in 1995 under Earth Task Force Goggle V. (지구특공대 가글파이브) This was after they aired a Korean dub of the first season of Mighty Morphin Power Rangers in 1994 as: The Invincible Power Rangers. (무적 파워레인저) and decided to go back to dubbing Sentai seasons. The reason why only the first season was dubbed due to the belief that the attention span of Korean kids was too short to keep up with a multiseason show. As of the Korean dub of Kaizoku Sentai Gokaiger, it was officially renamed Power Rangers Goggle V. (파워레인저 라이브맨) This entry is the oldest work to receive a Korean dub.
