= Sipho Moyo =

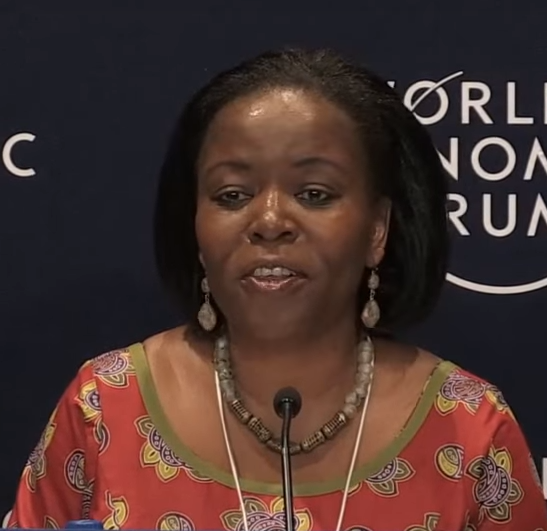

Director of Cabinet and Chief of Staff in the Office of the President of the African Development Bank
- Incumbent
- Assumed office 1 November 2015
- In office 2015–2020

Personal details
- Education: Howard University (MA in Development Economics) (PhD in Financial Economics)

Sipho Moyo is a Zimbabwean economist. She is the "Director of Cabinet and Chief of Staff in the Office of the President", at the African Development Bank (AfDB). She was appointed by Akinwumi Adesina, the President of the AfDB, and assumed office on 1 November 2019.

== Early life and education ==
Dr. Moyo is a native of Zimbabwe. She holds a master's degree in Development Economics (1989) and a Doctorate in Financial Economics (1994), both from Howard University in Washington, DC.

== Career ==
Prior to her current position, from 2010 until 2015, she was the Africa executive director for The ONE Campaign (ONE). Before joining ONE, for a period of 18 years, she served at the African Development Bank (AfDB), United Nations (UN) and the World Bank. She is a member of the Global Agenda Council (Africa) of the World Economic Forum and was recently appointed by the former president of Tanzania, Jakaya Kikwete, to sit on the independent review Panel of the Big Results Now (BRN) Initiative.

Dr. Moyo speech on the One World Media Award Ceremony AfDB Women's Rights in Africa Award 2016 was empowering otrher young women across Africa.

== Controversy ==
In March 2018, reports emerged from current and former staff of a toxic culture of bullying and abuse under Dr Moyo's term as the African executive director of the ONE Charity, allegations which Dr Moyo denied . The CEO of the ONE charity, Gayle Smith, confirmed that an investigation had revealed bullying and demeaning behaviour towards staff between 2011 and 2015 in the South African office. The charity had not been a registered taxpayer in South Africa and its foreign employees had to work on tourist visas.
