= Kelvin Moyo =

Zimbabwean association football player (born 1993)

Personal information
- Full name: Kelvin Njabulo Moyo
- Date of birth: 3 April 1993 (age 33)
- Place of birth: Zimbabwe
- Height: 1.70 m (5 ft 7 in)
- Position: Center-back

Team information
- Current team: BULAWAYO CHIEFS F.C
- Number: 18

Senior career*
Years	Team	Apps	(Gls)
2022-	Highlanders	19	
2009–2012	Bantu Rovers		
2013–2019	Platinum		
2019–2020	Chippa United	12	(0)
2021–2021	Nkana FC	12	(0 2026 = Scotland FC Zimbabwe)

International career^{‡}
2021–2021	Zimbabwe	6	(0)
- * Club domestic league appearances and goals ‡ National team caps and goals as of 15 February 2019

Kelvin Njabulo Moyo (born 3 April 1993) is a Zimbabwean footballer who plays as a center-back for Bulawayo Chiefs and the Zimbabwe national football team.

In February 2022, Zimbabwean international central defender, Kelvin Moyo joined Bulawayo Chiefs from the most successful club in Zambia, giants Nkana FC where he spend six months with them.
