= Obert Moyo =

Zimbabwean footballer (born 1985)

Personal information
- Full name: Peter Obert Moyo
- Date of birth: 29 July 1985 (age 41)
- Place of birth: Hwange, Zimbabwe
- Height: 1.83 m (6 ft 0 in)
- Position: Defender

Senior career*
Years	Team	Apps	(Gls)
2004–2009	Wankie/Hwange		
2009–2011	Pretoria University		
2011	Quelaton		
2012	Hwange		
2012–2013	Platinum Stars	3	(0)
2013–2016	CS Don Bosco		
2016–2018	Hwange		

International career^{‡}
2005–2008	Zimbabwe	10	(0)
- * Club domestic league appearances and goals as of 1 September 2020 ‡ National team caps and goals as of 1 September 2020

Obert Moyo (born 29 July 1985) is a retired Zimbabwean football defender.
