= Moxos =

Moxos may refer to:

- Moxos plains, or Llanos de Moxos, a region of Bolivia
- Moxos Province, Bolivia
- Moxo people, an indigenous people of Bolivia
- Llanos de Moxos (archaeology)
- Jesuit Missions of Moxos
- Moxoene, or Moxos, an ancient Armenian province
