= MoJo =

- Born: Ichirō Tomita; August 24, 1952 (age 74)
- Origin: Chiba Prefecture, Japan
- Genres: Folk; anison
- Occupations: Singer; composer
- Instrument: Vocals
- Years active: 1978–present
- Label: Nippon Columbia
- Website: homepage.mac.com/mojomojo1/MoJo/

Ichirō Tomita (富田 伊知郎, Tomita Ichirō; born August 24, 1952), known professionally as MoJo (モジョ), is a Japanese folk singer and composer who has performed on the soundtracks of various anime and tokusatsu series and movies. He is perhaps best known as the vocalist for the theme songs for Battle Fever J, Dai Sentai Goggle V, Kagaku Sentai Dynaman, Seiun Kamen Machineman (星雲仮面マシンマン, Seiun Kamen Mashinman), Albegas, and performed image songs for various series. He also sang the theme song of the fictional character Segata Sanshiro (played by Hiroshi Fujioka) who appeared in Sega's commercials between 1997 and 1998 to advertise the Sega Saturn in Japan.
