= Mahindra Mojo =

The Mahindra Mojo is a naked sports motorcycle.

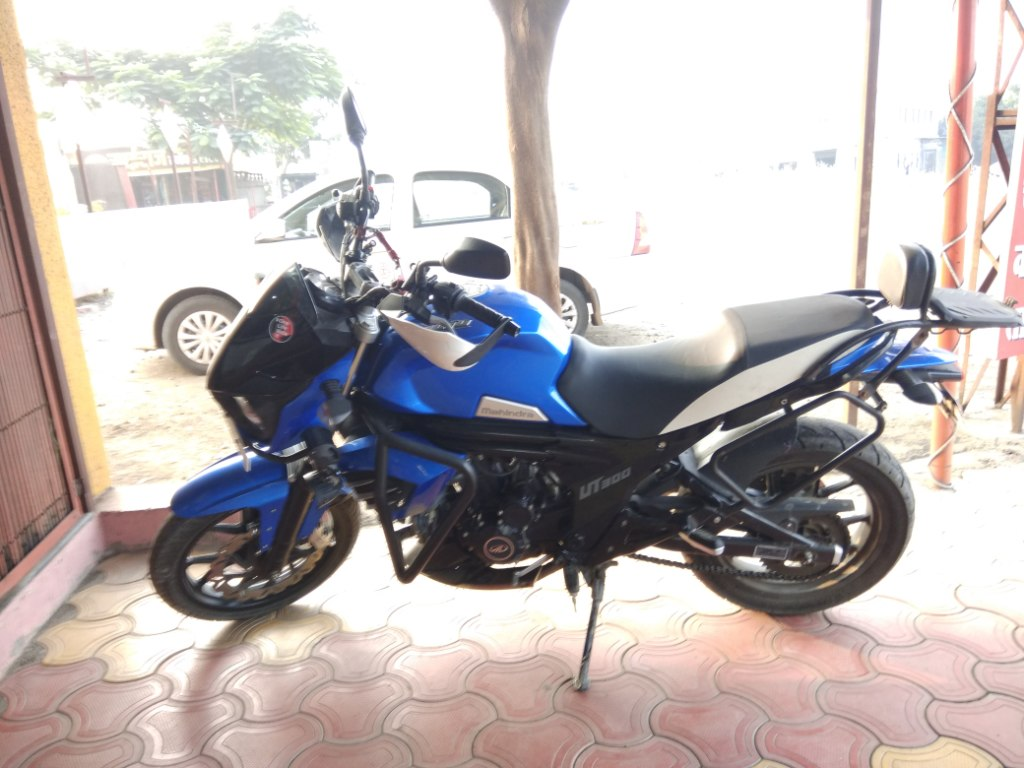
Mahindra Mojo UT 300 - BLUE

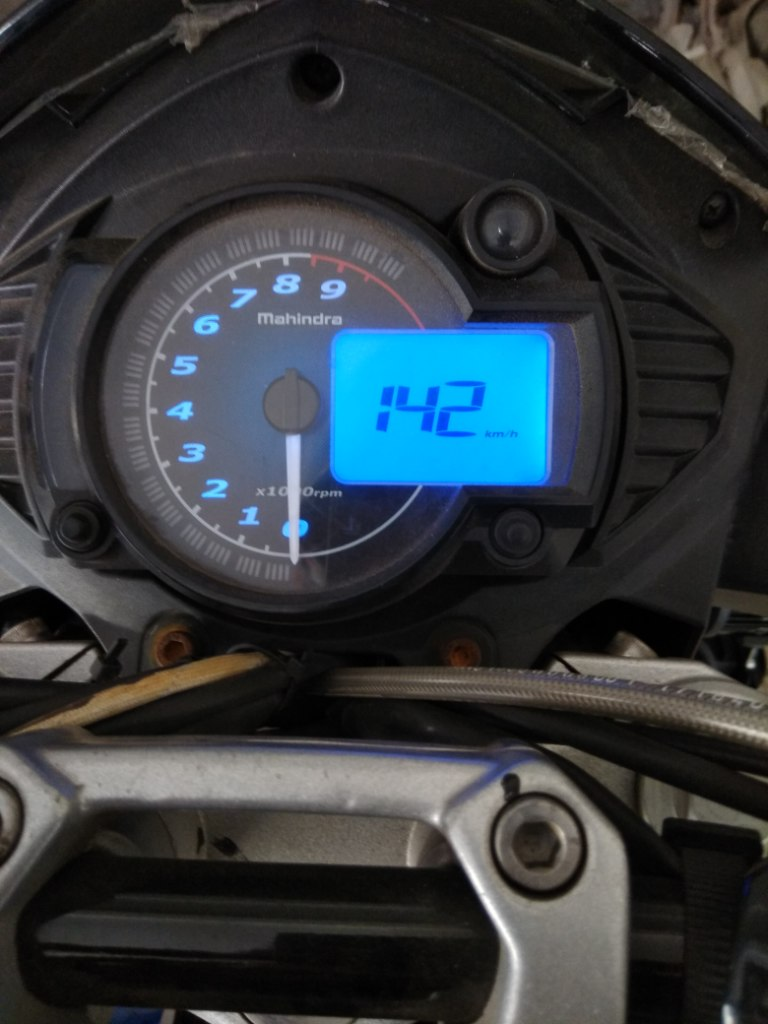
Mahindra mojo - Display Top speed recorder (UT 300)

== Specifications ==
Dimensions, Weight & CapacitiesGround ClearancePerformance & Mileage
Overall Length	2100 mm	
Overall Width	800 mm	
Overall Height	210 mm	
Seat Height	814.5 mm	
Wheelbase	1465 mm	
Dry Weight	165 kg	
Kerb/Wet Weight	182 kg	
Fuel Tank Capacity	21 litres	
Oil tank capacity	1.25 litres	
0–100 km/h	9.20 secs(xt version)	8.9 secs( bs6 version)
Top Speed	155 km/h(xt version)	144 km/h(bs6 version)
Mileage (City)	33 km/l	
Mileage (Highway)
Mileage (Combined)	36 km/l	
Instrument Console
Speedometer	Digital	
Tachometer	Analog	
Trip Meter	Digital (2)	
Odometer	Digital	
Clock
RPM/Gear Display		
Fuel Gauge
Low Battery Indicator		
Fuel Reserve Indicator		
RPM Limit Indicator		
0–100 km/h Timer
Malfunction Indicator		
Roll Over Sensor		
Maximum Speed Recorder		

Other Specifications
Frame/Chassis	Twin Tube Exposed Frame, Coaxial Mounting of Engine - Frame & Swing Arm
Caster Angle	28-degree
Trail	107 mm
Comfort & Convenience
Electric Start	Yes
Pillion Footrest	Yes
Pass Light	Yes
Step-up Seat/Split Seat	Yes
Pillion Grabrail	Yes
Stand Alarm	Yes
Battery
Battery Type	Maintenance Free
Capacity	11.2 AH
Voltage	12V
Lightning
Head Light	12V, 35W/35Wx2; H17
Tail Light	12V, LED, 12 nos.
Turn Signal Light (Front)	12V, 10W
Turn Signal Light (Rear)	12V, 10W
Head Light Type	Halogen
Projector Head Light	
Electricals
Electrical System	12V, Full DC
