= Shari Roman =

American film director

Shari Roman is an American artist, author, screenwriter and director.

== Biography ==
Originally commissioned by John Pierson for his Independent Film Channel (USA) program Split Screen, Roman's first short film, Lars from 1-10 about Danish Dogme film maker Lars von Trier won a slot at the Sundance Film Festival in 1999 and went on to screen at Edinburgh, London, Los Angeles, Tokyo, NYC's Museum of Modern Art, on television and in cinemas worldwide. She has directed a series of shorts, pop promos and additional docs on filmmakers, including British director Mike Figgis and cinematographer Anthony Dod Mantle. Along with the four original Dogme films, "Celebration," "The Idiots," "Mifune" and "The King is Alive," two of her short films were selected for 2005's official Dogme' 95 DVD collection, celebrating the 10th anniversary of von Trier's filmmaking manifesto. She was named one of the "Top 25 New Faces In Independent Film" by Filmmaker Magazine.

Her book on approaches to new cinema, Digital Babylon: Hollywood, Indiewood and Dogme '95 was published in 2001 by Lone Eagle Publishing and reissued by HCD/The Hollywood Reporter in 2003 and 2007. Her essay on von Trier, The Man Who Would Be Dogme, was published in the 2003 collection, Lars von Trier: Interviews by the University Press of Mississippi, as part of their Conversations with Filmmakers Series. Her fiction has appeared in Veneer Magazine, writings on cinema, music and art have been seen in numerous publications, including British Vogue, Mojo, The Guardian, The Independent and Time Out London. For the cover of Filmmaker Magazine (USA) she wrote The Genius of the System, a profile of multi-media artist Matthew Barney under a National Endowment for the Arts (NEA) grant.

== Miscellaneous ==
She 'sings' on Greg Weeks's 2008 solo album.

== Death ==
On October 4, 2009, Filmmaker Magazine reported that Shari Roman had died on September 9, 2009, at Mt. Sinai Hospital in New York after a brief illness.

== See also ==
- The Spot (web series)
