= Psychic Lover =

Japanese musical duo

Psychic Lover (サイキックラバー)
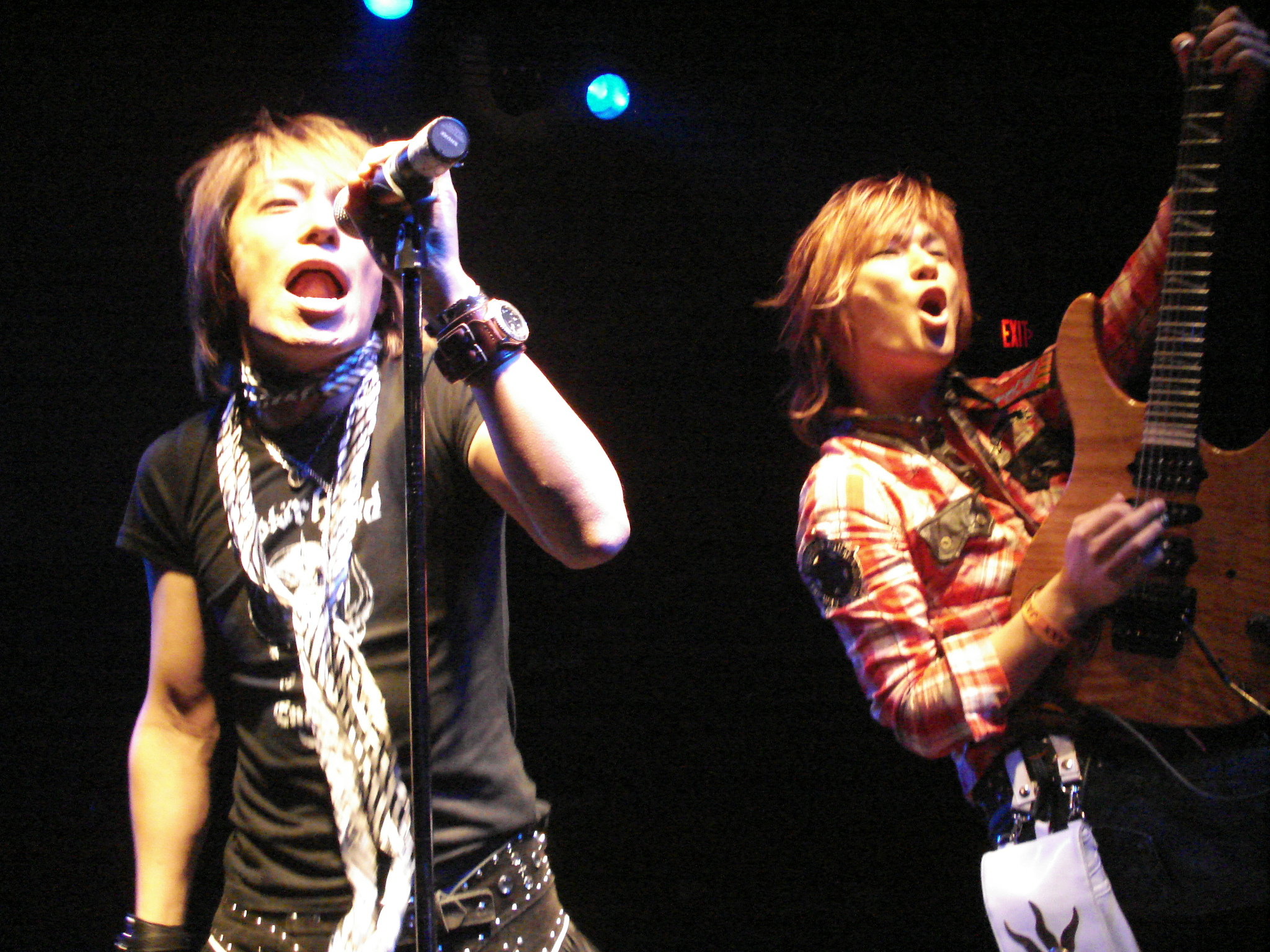
- Psychic Lover performing in Springfield, Virginia, in October 2007

Background information
- Origin: Japan
- Genres: Hard rock; power pop
- Years active: 1998–present
- Labels: Columbia Music Entertainment, Pony Canyon
- Members: YOFFY; IMAJO
- Website: psychiclover.net

Psychic Lover (サイキックラバー, Saikikku Rabā) are a rock duo consisting of vocalist Yoshiyuki "Yoffy" Wada (和田 よしゆき, Wada Yoshiyuki) and guitarist Tatsuhiro Imajo (今城 龍寛, Imajō Tatsushiro). Originally consisting of six members, YOFFY and IMAJO are the only two who remained for their rise to fame. Much of their work has been featured as opening and closing themes of Japanese television series and Anime. YOFFY has also worked with Eizo Sakamoto (vocalist of Anthem and Animetal), Masaaki Endoh, Sakura Nogawa, Ai Tokunaga, Ryoko Shintani, Mayumi Gojo, Sister MAYO, and Yukari Fukui on other projects. The group is also part of the Project.R supergroup.

In October 2007, the band performed in the United States for the first time at the Akiba Fest J-Pop Halloween Concert Ball in Springfield, Virginia.

== Discography ==
=== Singles ===
All songs are performed by Psychic Lover unless otherwise noted

1. "TRANSFORMER -Dream Again-" – February 1, 2003
  - B-Side: "Mune Ippai no..." (胸いっぱいの…; "A Whole Lotta...")
  - Transformers: Armada opening theme & insert song
2. "Never Ending Road" – February 1, 2003
  - B-Side: "NO NAME HEROES"
  - Transformers: Armada ending theme & insert song
3. "TRANSFORMER -Dream Again-/Never Ending Road" – March 29, 2003
4. "Transformers ~Kōtetsu no Yūki~" (Transformers ～鋼鉄の勇気～; "Transformers ~Steel Courage~") by Hideaki Takatori – July 23, 2003
  - B-Side: "Don't Give Up!!"
  - Transformers: Armada opening & ending themes
5. "Itsumo Te no Naka ni" (いつも手の中に; "Always in My Hand") – July 30, 2003
  - Dokkoida?! opening theme
  - B-Side: "Nekketsu Alpha Dokkoider" (熱血αドッコイダー, Nekketsu Arufa Dokkoidā; "Hot-Blooded Alpha Dokkoider") by Mr. Haijima (Mr.ハイジマ)
6. "Tokusou Sentai Dekaranger" (特捜戦隊デカレンジャー, Tokusō Sentai Dekarenjā) – March 3, 2004
  - B-Side: "Midnight Dekaranger" (ミッドナイト デカレンジャー, Middonaito Dekarenjā) by Isao Sasaki
  - Tokusou Sentai Dekaranger opening & ending themes
7. "Asu e no Tōshi" (明日への闘志; "Fight for Tomorrow") by Marina del ray – November 17, 2004
  - B-Side: "TAKE MY SOUL FOREVER"
  - Ring ni Kakero opening & ending themes
8. "Iza Yuke! Beetle" (いざ行け！ビートル, Iza Yuke! Bītoru; "Let's Go! Beetle") – June 1, 2004
  - B-Side: "I Believe"
  - Kabuto King Beetle opening & ending themes
9. "GAIKING" – December 21, 2005
  - B-Side: "Gai! Gai! Gaiking!" (ガイ!ガイ!ガイキング!, Gai Gai Gaikingu!)
  - Gaiking: Legend of Daiku-Maryu opening theme & insert song
10. "GoGo Sentai Boukenger" (轟轟戦隊ボウケンジャー, Gōgō Sentai Bōkenjā) – by NoB – March 8, 2006
  - B-Side: "Bōkensha on the Road" (冒険者 ON THE ROAD; "Adventurers on the Road")
  - GoGo Sentai Boukenger opening and ending theme
11. "XTC" – May 24, 2006
  - B-Side: "Kodō ~get closer~" (鼓動 ～get closer～; "Pulse ~get closer~")
  - Witchblade opening theme & insert song
12. "Oh! my god" – July 19, 2006
  - B-Side: "Sono Na wa Gaiking The Great" (その名はガイキング・ザ・グレート, Sono Na wa Gaikingu Za Gurēto; "His Name is Gaiking The Great") by Akira Kushida
  - Gaiking: Legend of Daiku-Maryu ending theme & insert song
13. "Number One Battle Brawlers" (ナンバーワン・バトルブローラーズ, Nanbā Wan Batoru Burōrāzu) – May 23, 2007
  - B-Side: "WONDER REVOLUTION"
  - Bakugan Battle Brawlers opening theme & insert song
14. "Precious Time, Glory Days" – November 21, 2007
  - B-Side: "SUBLIMINAL I LOVE YOU"
  - Yu-Gi-Oh! GX 4th opening theme
15. "Bucchigiri Infinite Generation" (ブッちぎり∞ジェネレーション, Butchigiri Infinitto Jenerēshon; "Winning By an Infinite Generation") – November 21, 2007
  - B-Side: "Always"
  - Bakugan Battle Brawlers opening theme
16. "LOST IN SPACE" – December 17, 2008
  - B-Side: "PRAYER -somewhere on the planet-"
  - Tytania ending theme
17. "Samurai Sentai Shinkenger" (侍戦隊シンケンジャー, Samurai Sentai Shinkenjā; as part of Project.R) – March 18, 2009
  - B-Side "Shirokujimuchū Shinkenger" (四六時夢中 シンケンジャー, Shirokujimuchū Shinkenjā; "Dreaming 24/7, Shinkenger") by Hideaki Takatori (Project.R)
  - Samurai Sentai Shinkenger opening & ending theme
18. "Chō! Saikyō! Warriors" (超！最強！ウォーリアーズ, Chō! Saikyō! Wōriāzu; "The Super! The Strongest! Warriors") – May 19, 2010
  - B-Side: "Beginning of Love"
  - Bakugan Battle Brawlers: New Vestroia opening theme & insert song
19. "Rewrite" – May 27, 2011
  - Rewrite 2nd opening theme
20. "Tagiru Chikara" (タギルチカラ, Tagiru Chikara; "Boiling Power") – February 29, 2012
  - Digimon Xros Wars: Time Traveling Hunter Boys insert song
21. "Vanguard Fight" – February 20, 2013
  - B-Side: "Eternal Flame " (ETERNAL FLAME〜永遠の炎, Eternal Flame〜eien no honou; "Eternal Flame ")
  - Cardfight!! Vanguard Link Joker opening theme
22. "Break your spell" – December 18, 2013
  - B-Side: "BIG BANG"
  - Cardfight!! Vanguard Link Joker 3rd opening theme
23. "ギガントシューターだっちゅーの!" (ギガントシューターだっちゅーの!, Gigantshooter Tsubasa; "Gigantshooter Tsubasa") – June 18, 2014
  - Gigantshooter Tsubasa opening theme

=== Albums ===
Studio

- Psychic Lover – June 21, 2006
- Psychic Lover II – September 2, 2009
- Psychic Lover III: Works – June 23, 2010
- Raise Your Hands – June 18, 2014

Compilation

- Psychic Lover IV: Best – December 12, 2012
- 15th Anniversary: Crush & Build – November 21, 2018
- 15th Anniversary: Psychic Mania – November 21, 2018

Soundtrack

- Tokusou Sentai Dekaranger: 10 Years After – October 7, 2015

=== DVD ===
- Psychic Lover LIVE 2007 Shibuya-Mutation – January 30, 2008
- Psychic Lover LIVE 2009 Let's Try Together – June 23, 2010
