= Samurai Sentai Shinkenger =

Television series

- Samurai Sentai Shinkenger title card
- Genre: Tokusatsu; Superhero fiction Action; Historical drama
- Created by: Toei Company
- Written by: Yasuko Kobayashi; Akatsuki Yamatoya; Daisuke Ishibashi
- Directed by: Shōjirō Nakazawa; Takayuki Shibasaki; Noboru Takemoto; Hiroyuki Kato; Katsuya Watanabe; Takao Nagaishi; Satoshi Morota
- Starring: Tori Matsuzaka; Hiroki Aiba; Rin Takanashi; Shogo Suzuki; Suzuka Morita; Keisuke Sohma; Runa Natsui; Goro Ibuki; Mitsuru Karahashi
- Voices of: Rintarō Nishi; Romi Park; Chō; Ryō Horikawa; Kōichi Tōchika
- Narrated by: Hironori Miyata
- Music by: Hiroshi Takaki
- Opening theme: "Samurai Sentai Shinkenger" by Psychic Lover (Project.R)
- Ending theme: "Shirokujimuchū Shinkenger" by Hideaki Takatori (Project.R)
- Country of origin: Japan
- No. of episodes: 49 (list of episodes)

Production
- Producers: Motoi Sasaki (TV Asahi); Takaaki Utsunomiya; Takahito Ōmori (Toei); Kōichi Yada; Akihiro Fukada (Toei Agency)
- Production location: Tokyo, Japan (Greater Tokyo Area)
- Running time: 24–25 minutes
- Production companies: TV Asahi; Toei Company; Toei Agency

Original release
- Network: TV Asahi
- Release: February 15, 2009 – February 7, 2010

Related
- Engine Sentai Go-onger; Tensou Sentai Goseiger

Samurai Sentai Shinkenger (侍戦隊シンケンジャー, Samurai Sentai Shinkenjā; Samurai Squadron Shinkenger) is the title of Toei Company's 33rd entry in its long-running Super Sentai metaseries of Japanese tokusatsu television series. It aired from February 15, 2009, to February 7, 2010, replacing Engine Sentai Go-onger and was replaced by Tensou Sentai Goseiger. It joined Kamen Rider Decade as a program featured in TV Asahi's Super Hero Time programming block, and following Decade's finale, it aired alongside Kamen Rider W. It incorporates elements from the Jidaigeki drama genre and Japanese themes and aesthetics. This is the first Super Sentai series to be filmed in HD with an HD camera having its resolution done at 720p.

Its footage and storyline was used for the American series Power Rangers Samurai and its follow up season, Super Samurai.

== Story ==
For eighteen generations, samurai of the Shiba House (志葉家, Shiba Ke) have suppressed the evil intentions of the Gedoushu, malevolent spirits that enter the world of the living from gaps between buildings and other structures. Now, Takeru Shiba, the youngest head of the Shiba House must gather his four vassals (家臣, kashin) in order to battle the Gedoushu under the revived Doukoku Chimatsuri as the Shinkengers. However, as they are joined by his childhood friend Genta Umemori, the vassals slowly learn that there's a reason for Takeru's behavior that sets him apart from his predecessors.

== Episodes ==
The episodes are numbered as Acts (第～幕, Dai (Number) Maku) and completely written in kanji. Episodes of Kamen Rider Decade on July 12 and July 19, 2009, as well as Shinkenger Act 21, featured a crossover between the two series.

No.	Title	Written by	Original release date
1	"The Gallant Appearance of the Five Samurai"; Transliteration: "Date Sugata Go Samurai" (Japanese: 伊達姿五侍)	Yasuko Kobayashi	February 15, 2009
2	"The Stylish Combination"; Transliteration: "Kiwametsuki Ikina Gattai" (Japanese: 極付粋合体)	Yasuko Kobayashi	February 22, 2009
3	"An Extermination Skill Contest"; Transliteration: "Udetaiji Udekurabe" (Japanese: 腕退治腕比)	Yasuko Kobayashi	March 1, 2009
4	"Nightly Tears of Sympathy"; Transliteration: "Yowanasake Namidagawa" (Japanese: 夜話情涙川)	Yasuko Kobayashi	March 8, 2009
5	"The Kabuto Origami"; Transliteration: "Kabuto Origami" (Japanese: 兜折神)	Yasuko Kobayashi	March 15, 2009
6	"The Abusive King"; Transliteration: "Waruguchiō" (Japanese: 悪口王)	Yasuko Kobayashi	March 22, 2009
7	"Marlin Fishing"; Transliteration: "Kajiki Ippontsuri" (Japanese: 舵木一本釣)	Yasuko Kobayashi	March 29, 2009
8	"The Brides are Spirited Away"; Transliteration: "Hanayome Kamikakushi" (Japanese: 花嫁神隠)	Yasuko Kobayashi	April 5, 2009
9	"The Tiger's Rebellion"; Transliteration: "Tora no Hankōki" (Japanese: 虎反抗期)	Yasuko Kobayashi	April 12, 2009
10	"The Great Sky Combination"; Transliteration: "Daitenkū Gattai" (Japanese: 大天空合体)	Yasuko Kobayashi	April 19, 2009
11	"A Threefold Strife"; Transliteration: "Mitsudomoe Ōsōdō" (Japanese: 三巴大騒動)	Yasuko Kobayashi	April 26, 2009
12	"The Very First Super Samurai Combination"; Transliteration: "Shijō Hatsu Chō Samurai Gattai" (Japanese: 史上初超侍合体)	Yasuko Kobayashi	May 3, 2009
13	"Heavy Cries"; Transliteration: "Omoi Nakigoe" (Japanese: 重泣声)	Yasuko Kobayashi	May 10, 2009
14	"The Foreign Samurai"; Transliteration: "Ikoku no Samurai" (Japanese: 異国侍)	Akatsuki Yamatoya	May 17, 2009
15	"The Imposter and the Real Deal's Arrest"; Transliteration: "Nisemono Honmono Ōtorimono" (Japanese: 偽物本物大捕物)	Daisuke Ishibashi	May 24, 2009
16	"The Power of the Kuroko"; Transliteration: "Kuroko no Chikara" (Japanese: 黒子力)	Akatsuki Yamatoya	May 31, 2009
17	"The Sushi Samurai"; Transliteration: "Sushi Samurai" (Japanese: 寿司侍)	Yasuko Kobayashi	June 7, 2009
18	"Samurai Promotion"; Transliteration: "Samurai Shūmei" (Japanese: 侍襲名)	Yasuko Kobayashi	June 14, 2009
19	"Learning the Samurai Disposition"; Transliteration: "Samuraigokoro Tenaraichū" (Japanese: 侍心手習中)	Yasuko Kobayashi	June 28, 2009
20	"The Ebi Origami's Transformation"; Transliteration: "Ebi Origami Henge" (Japanese: 海老折神変化)	Yasuko Kobayashi	July 5, 2009
21	"The Father and Son Bears"; Transliteration: "Oyakoguma" (Japanese: 親子熊)	Yasuko Kobayashi	July 19, 2009
22	"Lord Butler"; Transliteration: "Tono Shitsuji" (Japanese: 殿執事)	Yasuko Kobayashi	July 26, 2009
23	"The Rampaging Gedoushu"; Transliteration: "Bōsō Gedōshū" (Japanese: 暴走外道衆)	Yasuko Kobayashi	August 2, 2009
24	"The True Samurai Combination"; Transliteration: "Shin Samurai Gattai" (Japanese: 真侍合体)	Yasuko Kobayashi	August 9, 2009
25	"The Dream World"; Transliteration: "Yume Sekai" (Japanese: 夢世界)	Yasuko Kobayashi	August 16, 2009
26	"Decisive Match Number One"; Transliteration: "Kessen Ōichiban" (Japanese: 決戦大一番)	Yasuko Kobayashi	August 23, 2009
27	"The Switched Lives"; Transliteration: "Irekae Jinsei" (Japanese: 入替人生)	Yasuko Kobayashi	August 30, 2009
28	"The Lantern Samurai"; Transliteration: "Chōchin Samurai" (Japanese: 提灯侍)	Yasuko Kobayashi	September 6, 2009
29	"The Runaway Lantern"; Transliteration: "Iede Chōchin" (Japanese: 家出提灯)	Akatsuki Yamatoya	September 13, 2009
30	"The Manipulated Academy"; Transliteration: "Ayatsuri Gakuen" (Japanese: 操学園)	Daisuke Ishibashi	September 20, 2009
31	"The Kyoryu Origami"; Transliteration: "Kyōryū Origami" (Japanese: 恐竜折神)	Yasuko Kobayashi	September 27, 2009
32	"The Ushi Origami"; Transliteration: "Ushi Origami" (Japanese: 牛折神)	Yasuko Kobayashi	October 4, 2009
33	"The Great Bull King"; Transliteration: "Mōgyūdaiō" (Japanese: 猛牛大王)	Yasuko Kobayashi	October 11, 2009
34	"Fatherly Love, Girlish Innocence"; Transliteration: "Oyagokoro Musumegokoro" (Japanese: 親心娘心)	Yasuko Kobayashi	October 18, 2009
35	"The Eleven Origami, The Complete Combination"; Transliteration: "Jūichi Origami Zen Gattai" (Japanese: 十一折神全合体)	Yasuko Kobayashi	October 25, 2009
36	"The Curry Samurai"; Transliteration: "Karē Samurai" (Japanese: 加哩侍)	Akatsuki Yamatoya	November 1, 2009
37	"The Epic Glue Battle"; Transliteration: "Setchaku Daisakusen" (Japanese: 接着大作戦)	Daisuke Ishibashi	November 8, 2009
38	"Showdown with the Rifle Squad"; Transliteration: "Taiketsu Teppōtai" (Japanese: 対決鉄砲隊)	Yasuko Kobayashi	November 15, 2009
39	"The Very Urgent First Aid Emergency"; Transliteration: "Kyūkyū Kinkyū Daishikyū" (Japanese: 救急緊急大至急)	Yasuko Kobayashi	November 22, 2009
40	"The General Heads to the Front Lines"; Transliteration: "Ontaishō Shutsujin" (Japanese: 御大将出陣)	Yasuko Kobayashi	November 29, 2009
41	"The Sent Words"; Transliteration: "Okuru Kotoba" (Japanese: 贈言葉)	Yasuko Kobayashi	December 6, 2009
42	"The Two-Hundred Year Long Ambition"; Transliteration: "Nihyakunen no Yabō" (Japanese: 二百年野望)	Yasuko Kobayashi	December 13, 2009
43	"One Last Sword Stroke"; Transliteration: "Saigo no Hitotachi" (Japanese: 最後一太刀)	Yasuko Kobayashi	December 20, 2009
44	"The Eighteenth Head of the Shiba House"; Transliteration: "Shiba Ke Jūhachidaime Tōshu" (Japanese: 志葉家十八代目当主)	Yasuko Kobayashi	January 3, 2010
45	"The Impersonator"; Transliteration: "Kagemusha" (Japanese: 影武者)	Yasuko Kobayashi	January 10, 2010
46	"The Showdown Clash"; Transliteration: "Gekitotsu Ōshōbu" (Japanese: 激突大勝負)	Yasuko Kobayashi	January 17, 2010
47	"Bonds"; Transliteration: "Kizuna" (Japanese: 絆)	Yasuko Kobayashi	January 24, 2010
48	"The Final Great Decisive Battle"; Transliteration: "Saigo no Daikessen" (Japanese: 最後大決戦)	Yasuko Kobayashi	January 31, 2010
49 (Final)	"A Samurai Sentai Eternally"; Transliteration: "Samurai Sentai Eien ni" (Japanese: 侍戦隊永遠)	Yasuko Kobayashi	February 7, 2010

== Production ==
The trademark for the series was filed by Toei Company on August 12, 2008.

== Films and Specials ==
=== Theatrical ===
==== The Fateful War ====
The film Samurai Sentai Shinkenger the Movie: The Fateful War (侍戦隊シンケンジャー銀幕版 天下分け目の戦, Samurai Sentai Shinkenjā Ginmakuban Tenkawakeme no Tatakai) opened in Japanese theaters on August 8, 2009, double-billed with Kamen Rider Decade: All Riders vs. Dai-Shocker. Unlike previous films, it was filmed in 3-D, and is the first film in Japan to be filmed digitally in 3-D. A normal 2-D version is being shown in most theaters in Japan. The events of the movie take place between Acts 24 and 25.

==== Shinkenger vs. Go-onger ====
The film Samurai Sentai Shinkenger vs. Go-onger: Ginmaku Bang!! (侍戦隊シンケンジャーVSゴーオンジャー銀幕BANG!!, Samurai Sentai Shinkenjā Bui Esu Gōonjā Ginmakuban) was released in theaters on January 30, 2010, featuring a crossover between the Shinkenger and Go-onger casts and characters. The heroes of Tensou Sentai Goseiger make a cameo appearance in the film. The events of the movie take place between Acts 35 and 36.

==== Goseiger vs. Shinkenger ====
The film Tensou Sentai Goseiger vs. Shinkenger: Epic on Ginmaku (天装戦隊ゴセイジャーVSシンケンジャー エピック on 銀幕, Tensō Sentai Goseijā Bui Esu Shinkenjā Epikku on Ginmaku) was released in theaters on January 22, 2011, featuring a crossover between the Goseiger and Shinkenger casts and characters. The heroes of Kaizoku Sentai Gokaiger make a cameo appearance in the film.

=== V-Cinema ===
==== Samurai Sentai Shinkenger Returns ====
In June 2010, the V-Cinema release Samurai Sentai Shinkenger Returns: Special Act (帰ってきた侍戦隊シンケンジャー 特別幕, Kaettekita Samurai Sentai Shinkenjā: Tokubetsu Maku) was released. The Shinkengers are attacked by a remnant Gedoushu Ayakashi who traps them in various film genres. The events of the movie take place between Acts 43 and 44.

==== Kyuranger vs. Space Squad ====
Uchu Sentai Kyuranger vs. Space Squad (宇宙戦隊キュウレンジャーVSスペース・スクワッド, Uchū Sentai Kyūrenjā Bāsasu Supēsu Sukuwaddo) is a V-Cinema release that features a crossover between Uchu Sentai Kyuranger and Space Squad. Aside from the main cast of Kyuranger, Yuma Ishigaki and Hiroaki Iwanaga (Space Sheriff Gavan: The Movie), Yuka Hirata (Juken Sentai Gekiranger), Mitsuru Karahashi (Samurai Sentai Shinkenger), Kei Hosogai (Kaizoku Sentai Gokaiger) and Ayame Misaki (Tokumei Sentai Go-Busters) return to reprise their respective roles. The V-Cinema was released on DVD and Blu-ray on August 8, 2019.

== Cast ==
- Takeru Shiba (志葉 丈瑠, Shiba Takeru): Tori Matsuzaka (松坂 桃李, Matsuzaka Tōri) main leader
- Ryunosuke Ikenami (池波 流ノ介, Ikenami Ryūnosuke): Hiroki Aiba (相葉 弘樹, Aiba Hiroki)
- Mako Shiraishi (白石 茉子, Shiraishi Mako): Rin Takanashi (高梨 臨, Takanashi Rin)
- Chiaki Tani (谷 千明, Tani Chiaki): Shogo Suzuki (鈴木 勝吾, Suzuki Shōgo)
- Kotoha Hanaori (花織 ことは, Hanaori Kotoha): Suzuka Morita (森田 涼花, Morita Suzuka)
- Genta Umemori (梅盛 源太, Umemori Genta): Keisuke Sohma (相馬 圭祐, Sōma Keisuke)
- Hikoma Kusakabe (日下部 彦馬, Kusakabe Hikoma): Goro Ibuki (伊吹 吾郎, Ibuki Gorō)
- Kaoru Shiba (志葉 薫, Shiba Kaoru): Runa Natsui (夏居 瑠奈, Natsui Runa)
- Toshizo Tanba (丹波 歳三, Tanba Toshizō): Kazuyuki Matsuzawa (松澤 一之, Matsuzawa Kazuyuki)
- Juzo Fuwa (腑破 十臓, Fuwa Jūzō): Mitsuru Karahashi (唐橋 充, Karahashi Mitsuru)

=== Voice cast ===
- Doukoku Chimatsuri (血祭 ドウコク, Chimatsuri Dōkoku): Rintarō Nishi (西 凛太朗, Nishi Rintarō)
- Tayu Usukawa (薄皮 太夫, Usukawa Dayū): Romi Park (朴 璐美, Paku Romi)
  - In episodes 25 and 40, Romi Park appeared on screen as Usuyuki (薄雪), Tayu's original human form.
- Shitari of the Bones (骨のシタリ, Hone no Shitari): Chō (チョー)
- Akumaro Sujigarano (筋殻 アクマロ, Sujigarano Akumaro): Ryō Horikawa (堀川 りょう, Horikawa Ryō)
- DaiGoyou (ダイゴヨウ, Daigoyō): Kōichi Tōchika (遠近 孝一, Tōchika Kōichi)
- Sushi Changer (スシチェンジャー, Sushi Chenjā), Inromaru (インロウマル, Inrōmaru), Narrator: Hironori Miyata (宮田 浩徳, Miyata Hironori)

=== Guest cast ===
- Takeru's father (1, 12, 33, 46): Kanji Tsuda (津田 寛治, Tsuda Kanji)
- Yanasudare (ヤナスダレ, Yanasudare; Voice; 5): Hiroshi Tsuchida (土田 大, Tsuchida Hiroshi)
- Kana (香奈; 12): Kayoko Shibata (柴田 かよこ, Shibata Kayoko)
- Daiki Kaito (海東 大樹, Kaitō Daiki; 20): Kimito Totani (戸谷 公人, Totani Kimito)
- Tsukasa Kadoya (門矢 士, Kadoya Tsukasa; 21): Masahiro Inoue (井上 正大, Inoue Masahiro)
- Natsumi Hikari (光 夏海, Hikari Natsumi; 21): Kanna Mori (森 カンナ, Mori Kanna)
- Narutaki (鳴滝, Narutaki; 21): Tatsuhito Okuda (奥田 達士, Okuda Tatsuhito)
- Eijiro Hikari (光 栄次郎, Hikari Eijirō; 21): Renji Ishibashi (石橋 蓮司, Ishibashi Renji)
- Toji Sakakibara (榊原 藤次, Sakakibara Tōji; 32–33): Tetsuo Morishita (森下 哲夫, Morishita Tetsuo)
- Kyoko Shiraishi (白石 響子, Shiraishi Kyōko; 34): Kazue Itoh (伊藤 かずえ, Itō Kazue)
- Masataka Shiba (志葉 雅貴, Shiba Masataka; 45): Masaya Matsukaze (松風 雅也, Matsukaze Masaya)

== Songs ==
Opening theme

- "Samurai Sentai Shinkenger" (侍戦隊シンケンジャー, Samurai Sentai Shinkenjā)
  - Lyrics: Shoko Fujibayashi
  - Composition: YOFFY
  - Arrangement: Project.R (Kenichiro Ōishi & Psychic Lover)
  - Artist: Psychic Lover (Project.R)

Ending theme

- "Shirokujimuchū Shinkenger" (四六時夢中 シンケンジャー, Shirokujimuchū Shinkenjā; "Dreaming 24/7, Shinkenger")
  - Lyrics: Shoko Fujibayashi
  - Composition: Hideaki Takatori
  - Arrangement: Project.R (Hiroaki Kagoshima)
  - Artist: Hideaki Takatori (Project.R)
  - Instruments: Zetki (Z旗, Zettoki)
  - Episodes: 1-20, 29–48
- "Shirokujimuchū Shinkenger ~Ginmakuban~" (四六時夢中 シンケンジャー～銀幕版～, Shirokujimuchū Shinkenjā ~Ginmakuban~; "Dreaming 24/7, Shinkenger (Movie Version)")
  - Lyrics: Shoko Fujibayashi
  - Composition: Hideaki Takatori
  - Arrangement: Project.R (Hiroaki Kagoshima)
  - Artist: Shinkengers (Tori Matsuzaka, Hiroki Aiba, Rin Takanashi, Shogo Suzuki, Suzuka Morita, Keisuke Sohma) & Hideaki Takatori
  - Episodes: 21–28

The opening and ending themes of Shinkenger are performed by Psychic Lover and Hideaki Takatori as part of Project.R, respectively. The opening is also featured as a playable song in Taiko no Tatsujin Wii: Do Don to 2 Daime.

Its opening theme song single ranked highly on the Oricon charts, reaching #4 on the Daily Ranking Charts on its day of release. and peaked at #6 on the weekly charts selling 20,130 copies within its first week of release and stayed in the top 30 ranks for 4 weeks straight.
