= List of Saint Seiya Omega episodes =

Cover of the first release of Saint Seiya Omega featuring Pegasus Koga and Sagittarius Seiya.

Saint Seiya Omega is an anime series produced by Toei Animation and a spin-off adapted from Masami Kurumada's manga series Saint Seiya, produced in commemoration of the 25th anniversary of the franchise. The series follows the adventures of Koga, a young man who becomes one of the goddess Athena's 88 soldiers known as Saints to protect the world from chaos and the forces of evil.

Directed by Morio Hatano and written by Reiko Yoshida, the series started airing in TV Asahi on April 1, 2012. Beginning with the second season, which premiered in Japan on April 7, 2013, Hatano was replaced by Tatsuya Nagamine and Kohei Kureta and Yoshida by Yoshimi Narita. Bandai Visual is collecting the series in both DVD and Blu-Ray format with each volume containing four episodes. The first DVD compilation of Saint Seiya Omega was released on August 24, 2012. Toshihiko Sahashi is the composer of the anime.

The series is organized according to seasons and chapters, with each season thus far containing two chapters and each chapter having its own opening theme song. The first chapter of the series is "Chapter Mars" (マルス編, Marusu Hen), comprising episodes 1-27, and its opening theme song is "Pegasus Fantasy ver.Ω" (ペガサス幻想(ファンタジー) ver. Ω, Pegasasu Fantajī ver. Omega), performed by MAKE-UP featuring Shoko Nakagawa. The second chapter is "Chapter Zodiac Temples" (十二宮編, Jūnikyū Hen), comprising episodes 28-51, and features the opening song "Next Generation" (新星Ω神話（ネクストジェネレーション）, Nekusuto Jenerēshon) performed by Root Five (√5（ルート・ファイブ）, Rūto Faibu). The second season begins the "Chapter New Cloth" (新生聖衣（ニュークロス）編, Nyū Kurosu Hen), comprising episodes 52-77, and with it a new opening theme titled "Mirai Saint Omega ~Saint Evolution~" (未来聖闘士Ω～セイントエボリューション～, Mirai Seinto Omega ~Seinto Eboryūshon~) performed by Nagareda Project (流田Project, Nagareda Purojekuto). The second half of season 2 comprises the "Chapter Omega Awakens" (Ω覚醒編, Omega Kakusei Hen) from episodes 78-97, and uses the opening song "Senkō Strings" (閃光ストリングス, Senkō Sutoringusu) performed by the band Cyntia.

Like in most of the anime that are broadcast in Japan by TV Asahi, all the credits are incorporated into the opening themes and there are no endings or ending themes for the show.

== Episode list ==
=== Season 1 ===
No.	Title	Original release date
1	"The Life That Was Saved by Seiya! Revive, Legend of the Saints!"; Transliteration: "Seiya ga Sukutta Inochi! Yomigaere Seinto Densetsu!" (Japanese: 星矢が救った命！甦れ聖闘士（セイント）伝説！)	April 1, 2012
2	"Departure! Saint of the New Generation!"; Transliteration: "Tabidachi! Shinsedai no Seinto!" (Japanese: 旅立ち！新世代の聖闘士（セイント）！)	April 8, 2012
3	"The Law of the Mask! The Wind Saint Appears!"; Transliteration: "Kamen no Okite! Kaze no Seinto Arawaru!" (Japanese: 仮面の掟！風の聖闘士（セイント）現わる！)	April 15, 2012
4	"The Son of a Hero! Ryuho Versus Kōga!"; Transliteration: "Eiyū no Musuko! Ryūhō tai Kōga!" (Japanese: 英雄の息子！龍峰対光牙！)	April 22, 2012
5	"Selection Trials! Challenged in the Camp of Death!"; Transliteration: "Senbatsu Shiken! Kesshi no Kyanpu ni Idome!" (Japanese: 選抜試験！決死のキャンプに挑め！)	April 29, 2012
6	"The Curtain Raises! The Saints Fight!"; Transliteration: "Kaimaku! Seinto Faito!" (Japanese: 開幕！聖闘士（セイント）ファイト！)	May 6, 2012
7	"The Fist of a Friend! Strike, Pegasus Meteor Punches!"; Transliteration: "Tomo no Kobushi! Ute, Pegasasu Ryūsei-ken!" (Japanese: 友の拳！打て、ペガサス流星拳！)	May 13, 2012
8	"Fateful Meeting! The Smashing Gold Saint!"; Transliteration: "Shukumei no Deai! Shōgeki no Gōrudo Seinto!" (Japanese: 宿命の出会い！衝撃の黄金聖闘士（ゴールドセイント）！)	May 20, 2012
9	"The Crisis of Sanctuary! Dash, Ninja Saint!"; Transliteration: "Sankuchuari no Kiki! Ninja Seinto, Kakeru!" (Japanese: 聖域の危機！忍者聖闘士（セイント）、駆ける！)	May 27, 2012
10	"Suicidal Rescue! The Other Gold Saint!"; Transliteration: "Kesshi no Dakkan! Mō Hitori no Gōrudo Seinto!" (Japanese: 決死の奪還！もう一人の黄金聖闘士（ゴールドセイント）！)	June 3, 2012
11	"Protect Aria! The Attack of Sonia, the Pursuer!"; Transliteration: "Aria o Mamore! Tsuisekisha Sonia no Shūgeki!" (Japanese: アリアを守れ！追跡者ソニアの襲撃！)	June 10, 2012
12	"The Inherited Cosmo! Shun, the Legendary Saint!"; Transliteration: "Uketsugareru Kosumo! Densetsu no Seinto, Shun!" (Japanese: 受け継がれる小宇宙（コスモ）！伝説の聖闘士（セイント）、瞬！)	June 17, 2012
13	"Seiya's Message! To You, I Entrust Athena!"; Transliteration: "Seiya no Messēji! Omaetachi ni, Atena o Takusu!" (Japanese: 星矢のメッセージ！お前たちに、アテナを託す！)	June 24, 2012
14	"Reunion in My Homeland! The Mentor and Disciple Duel in the Snowfields!"; Transliteration: "Kokyō de no Saikai! Setsugen no Shitei Taiketsu!" (Japanese: 故郷での再会！雪原の師弟対決！)	July 1, 2012
15	"The Poisonous Fangs Approach! The Second Ruins Surrounded by Intrigue!"; Transliteration: "Semaru Dokuga! Inbō Uzumaku Dai-ni no Iseki" (Japanese: 迫る毒牙！陰謀うずまく第二の遺跡！)	July 15, 2012
16	"At the Star of Destiny's Side! The Way of Living of the Saints!"; Transliteration: "Unmei no Hoshi no Moto ni! Seinto-tachi no Ikiru Michi!" (Japanese: 運命の星のもとに！聖闘士（セイント）達の生きる道！)	July 22, 2012
17	"We Must Protect them! The Cloth Repairer and the Legendary Ore!"; Transliteration: "Mamorubekimono! Kurosu no Shūfukushi to Densetsu no Kōseki!" (Japanese: 守るべきもの！聖衣（クロス）の修復師と伝説の鉱石！)	July 29, 2012
18	"The Flames of Revenge! Souma, the Battle of Destiny!"; Transliteration: "Fukushū no Honō! Sōma, Innen no Tatakai!" (Japanese: 復習の炎！蒼摩、因縁の闘い！)	August 5, 2012
19	"The Secret of the Five Old Peaks! Pass It Down, Father, the Fighting Spirit of Shiryu!"; Transliteration: "Gorōhō no Himitsu! Keishōse yo, Chichi, Shiryū no Tōshi!" (Japanese: 五老峰の秘密！継承せよ、父、紫龍の闘志！)	August 12, 2012
20	"For Aria's Sake! Eden's Wrathful Lightning Strike!"; Transliteration: "Aria no Tame ni! Eden, Ikari no Raigeki!" (Japanese: アリアのために！エデン、怒りの雷撃！)	August 19, 2012
21	"The Flightless Pegasus! The Journey Back From Defeat!"; Transliteration: "Tobenai Pegasasu! Sōshitsu kara no Tabidachi!" (Japanese: とべないペガサス！喪失からの旅立ち！)	August 26, 2012
22	"Feelings Toward My Friends! The Pride of the Saints and the Way of the Shinobi!"; Transliteration: "Tomo e no Omoi! Shinobi no Michi to Seinto no Kyōji!" (Japanese: 友への思い！忍びの道と聖闘士（セイント）の矜持！)	September 2, 2012
23	"Invading the Enemy Camp! Young Saints, Together Again!"; Transliteration: "Tekijin Totsunyū! Wakaki Seinto, Saishūketsu!" (Japanese: 敵陣突入！若き聖闘士（セイント）、再集結！)	September 9, 2012
24	"Aiming for a Reunion! Let's Go to the Last Ruins!"; Transliteration: "Saikai o Mezashite! Ike, Saigo no Iseki e!" (Japanese: 再会を目指して！行け、最後の遺跡へ！)	September 16, 2012
25	"Unknown Territory! The Moment of a Chance Meeting!"; Transliteration: "Michinaru Ryōiki! Meguriai no Toki!" (Japanese: 未知なる領域！めぐりあいの時！)	September 23, 2012
26	"Reminiscences and Revenge! The Trap of the Ruins of Darkness!"; Transliteration: "Tsuioku to Fukushū! Yami no Iseki no Wana!" (Japanese: 追憶と復讐！闇の遺跡の罠！)	September 30, 2012
27	"The End of the Journey! The Light of the Girl and the Youths!"; Transliteration: "Tabi no Shūen! Shōjo no Hikari to Wakamono-tachi!" (Japanese: 旅の終焉！少女の光と若者たち！)	October 7, 2012
28	"The Strongest Army! The Gathering of the Gold Saints!"; Transliteration: "Saikyō no Gundan! Gōrudo Seinto Shūketsu!" (Japanese: 最強の軍団！黄金聖闘士（ゴールドセイント）集結！)	October 14, 2012
29	"The Beginning of a New Battle! The Zodiac Temples!"; Transliteration: "Aratana Tatakai no Makuake! Kōdōjūnikyū!" (Japanese: 新たな闘いの幕開け！黄金十二宮！)	October 21, 2012
30	"Wondrous Power! The Taurus Saint!"; Transliteration: "Kyōi no Jitsuryoku! Kingyūkyū no Seinto!" (Japanese: 驚異の実力！金牛宮の聖闘士（セイント）！)	October 28, 2012
31	"The Crossroad of Fate! The Enigma of Gemini!"; Transliteration: "Unmei no Bunkiten! Sōjikyū no Nazo!" (Japanese: 運命の分岐点！双児宮の謎！)	November 4, 2012
32	"The True Terror! The Unearthly Atmosphere of Cancer!"; Transliteration: "Makoto no Kyōfu! Kyokaikyū ni Tadayou Yōki!" (Japanese: 真の恐怖！巨蟹宮に漂う妖気！)	November 11, 2012
33	"The Essence of Cosmo! The Seventh Sense!"; Transliteration: "Kosumo no Shinzui! Sebun Senshizu!" (Japanese: 小宇宙（コスモ）の真髄！セブンセンシズ！)	November 18, 2012
34	"The Threshold Between Life and Death! The Battle of the Underworld!"; Transliteration: "Seishi no Hazama! Meikai no Tatakai!" (Japanese: 生死の狭間！冥界の闘い！)	November 25, 2012
35	"The Fist of the Lion! Eden's Sorrowful Battle!"; Transliteration: "Shishi no Kobushi! Eden, Shōshin no Tatakai!" (Japanese: 獅子の拳！エデン、傷心の闘い！)	December 2, 2012
36	"Sublime Pride! Mycenae's Kingly Fist!"; Transliteration: "Kedakaki Puraido! Mikēne, Ōja no Kobushi!" (Japanese: 気高きプライド！ミケーネ、王者の拳！)	December 9, 2012
37	"The Unshakable Guardian! The Virgo Gold Saint!"; Transliteration: "Yuruginaki Shugosha! Barugo no Gōrudo Seinto!" (Japanese: 揺るぎなき守護者！乙女座（バルゴ）の黄金聖闘士（ゴールドセイント）！)	December 16, 2012
38	"The Heroic Betrayal! Eden's Determined Fighting Spirit!"; Transliteration: "Yūkan naru Hangyaku! Eden, Ketsui no Tōshi!" (Japanese: 勇敢なる反逆！エデン、決意の闘志！)	December 23, 2012
39	"Reunion in Libra! Clash, Gold vs. Gold!"; Transliteration: "Tenbinkyū no Saikai! Gekitotsu, Gōrudo tai Gōrudo!" (Japanese: 天秤宮の再会！激突、黄金対黄金！)	January 6, 2013
40	"Sonia's Resolution! The Chain of Fate Is Broken!"; Transliteration: "Sonia no Kakugo! Innen no Rensa o Tate!" (Japanese: ソニアの覚悟！因縁の連鎖を断て！)	January 13, 2013
41	"Tokisada's Ambition! The Champion of the End of Time!"; Transliteration: "Tokisada no Yabō! Jikan no Hate no Hasha!" (Japanese: 時貞の野望！時間の果ての覇者！)	January 20, 2013
42	"The Traitorous Gold Saint! Ionia versus Kōga!"; Transliteration: "Uragiri no Gōrudo Seinto! Ionia tai Kōga!" (Japanese: 裏切りの黄金聖闘士（ゴールドセイント）！イオニア対光牙！)	January 27, 2013
43	"Resurrection of the War Gods! Break Into the Last Temple!"; Transliteration: "Gunshin Fukkatsu! Totsunyū, Saigo no Kyū!" (Japanese: 軍神復活！突入、最後の宮！)	February 3, 2013
44	"For My Friends! The Hidden Power in Koga!"; Transliteration: "Nakama no Tameni! Kōga ni Himerareshi Chikara!" (Japanese: 仲間のために！光牙に秘められし力！)	February 10, 2013
45	"The Malevolent War God! Mars and Ludwig!"; Transliteration: "Araburu Gunshin! Marusu to Rūdovigu!" (Japanese: 荒ぶる軍神！マルスとルードヴィグ！)	February 17, 2013
46	"Koga and Eden! Young Cosmo, Slay the Darkneess!"; Transliteration: "Kōga to Eden! Wakaki Kosumo yo Yami o Ute!" (Japanese: 光牙とエデン！若き小宇宙（コスモ）よ闇を討て！)	February 24, 2013
47	"The Only Hope! A New Battlefield!"; Transliteration: "Wazukana Kibō! Aratanaru Tatakai no Chi!" (Japanese: わずかな希望！新たなる闘いの地！)	March 3, 2013
48	"Gather, Friends! Kōga's Overflowing Cosmo!"; Transliteration: "Tomo yo Tsudoe! Kōga no Minagiru Kosumo!" (Japanese: 友よ集え！光牙のみなぎる小宇宙（コスモ）！)	March 10, 2013
49	"The Ruler of Darkness! The Terror of Abzu!"; Transliteration: "Yami no Shihaisha! Apusu no Kyōfu!" (Japanese: 闇の支配者！アプスの恐怖！)	March 17, 2013
50	"Take it to Seiya! The Wish of the Young Saints!"; Transliteration: "Seiya ni Todoke! Wakaki Seinto-tachi no Negai!" (Japanese: 星矢に届け！若き聖闘士（セイント）達の願い！)	March 24, 2013
51	"Shine, Kōga! The Final Battle Between Light and Darkness!"; Transliteration: "Kagayake Kōga! Hikari to Yami no Saishū Kessen!" (Japanese: 輝け光牙！光と闇の最終決戦！)	March 31, 2013

=== Season 2 ===
No. overall	No. in season	Title	Original release date
52	1	"The New Cloth! Take Flight, New Pegasus!"; Transliteration: "Aratana Kurosu! Tobe, Nyū Pegasasu!" (Japanese: 新たな聖衣（クロス）！翔べ、新生（ニュー）ペガサス！)	April 7, 2013
53	2	"The Reunion! Souma, Let Your Spirit's Flame Burn!"; Transliteration: "Saikai! Sōma yo, Tamashii no Honō o Moyase!" (Japanese: 再会！蒼摩よ、魂の炎を燃やせ！)	April 14, 2013
54	3	"Strengthen My Courage! Cloth, Be Reborn!"; Transliteration: "Yūki o Chikara ni! Kurosu yo, Umarekaware!" (Japanese: 勇気を力に！聖衣（クロス）よ、生まれ変われ！)	April 21, 2013
55	4	"The Irreplaceable One! Dragon, Awake!"; Transliteration: "Kakegaenonaimono! Mezame yo, Doragon!" (Japanese: かけがえのないもの！目覚めよ、龍（ドラゴン）！)	April 28, 2013
56	5	"Resound in my Heart! Haruto's Shout!"; Transliteration: "Kokoro ni Hibike! Haruto no Shauto!" (Japanese: 心に響け！栄斗のシャウト！)	May 5, 2013
57	6	"Defeat Pegasus! Eden, the Warrior of Solitude!"; Transliteration: "Pegasasu o Taose! Kokō no Senshi Eden!" (Japanese: ペガサスを倒せ！孤高の戦士エデン！)	May 12, 2013
58	7	"The Four Great Kings Arrive! Athena vs. Pallas Complete Showdown!"; Transliteration: "Shiten'ō Arawaru! Atena Tai Parasu Zenmen Taiketsu!" (Japanese: 四天王現わる！アテナ対パラス全面対決！)	May 19, 2013
59	8	"The Bond between Brothers! Andromeda Shun Joins the Battle!"; Transliteration: "Kyōdai no Kizuna! Andoromeda Shun, Sansen!" (Japanese: 兄弟の絆！アンドロメダ瞬、参戦！)	May 26, 2013
60	9	"The Star of Steel! Subaru, Embrace your Fighting Spirit of Steel!"; Transliteration: "Kōtetsu no Hoshi! Subaru yo, Hagane no Tōshi o Idake!" (Japanese: 鋼鉄の星！昴よ、鋼の闘志を抱け！)	June 2, 2013
61	10	"A Great Army Approaches! The Battle to Defend Palaestra!"; Transliteration: "Semaru Daigunzei! Paraisutora Bōei Sen!" (Japanese: 迫る大軍勢！パライストラ防衛戦！)	June 9, 2013
62	11	"Genbu's Deadly Battle! Excalibur vs. the Sword of Libra"; Transliteration: "Genbu no Shitō! Ekusukaribā tai Raibura no Sōdo!" (Japanese: 玄武の死闘！聖剣（エクスカリバー）対天秤（ライブラ）の剣（ソード）！)	June 23, 2013
63	12	"Seiya, Head to the Frontlines! Athena's Decision!"; Transliteration: "Seiya, Shutsujin! Atena no Ketsui!" (Japanese: 星矢、出陣！アテナの決意！)	July 7, 2013
64	13	"Go Forward, Saint! The Innaccesible Road to Pallasvelda!"; Transliteration: "Susume Seinto! Parasu Beruda e Kewashiki Michi!" (Japanese: 進め聖闘士（セイント）！パラスベルダへ険しきへ道！)	July 14, 2013
65	14	"Break Down the Gate of the Iron Wall! Pegasus's Spear and Dragon's Shield!"; Transliteration: "Yabure Teppeki no Mon! Pegasasu no Hoko to Doragon no Tate!" (Japanese: 破れ鉄壁の門！天馬（ペガサス）の矛と龍（ドラゴン）の盾！)	July 21, 2013
66	15	"The Steel Struggle! The Nameless Warriors!"; Transliteration: "Kōtetsu Funtō! Namonaki Yūsha-tachi!" (Japanese: 鋼鉄奮闘！名もなき勇者たち！)	July 28, 2013
67	16	"Subaru, the Cosmo of Wonder! Eden's Mission!"; Transliteration: "Subaru, Kyōi no Kosumo! Eden no Shimei!" (Japanese: 昴、驚異の小宇宙（コスモ）！エデンの使命！)	August 4, 2013
68	17	"Koga and Pallas! Encounter on the Battlefield!"; Transliteration: "Kōga to Parasu! Senjō no Deai!" (Japanese: 光牙とパラス！戦場の出会い！)	August 11, 2013
69	18	"Stir the Storm of Flames! Yuna and Souma's Friendship!"; Transliteration: "Honō no Arashi o Okose! Yuna to Sōma no Yūjō!" (Japanese: 炎の嵐を起こせ！ユナと蒼摩の友情！)	August 18, 2013
70	19	"The Cloth Destroyer! The Stray Pallasite Attack!"; Transliteration: "Kurosu no Hakaisha! Hagure Parasaito Raishū!" (Japanese: 聖衣（クロス）の破壊者！はぐれパラサイト来襲！)	September 1, 2013
71	20	"The Accursed Cloth!? The Equuleus Saint!"; Transliteration: "Norowareta Kurosu!? Ekureusu no Seinto!" (Japanese: 呪われた聖衣（クロス）!?小馬座（エクレウス）の聖闘士（セイント）！)	September 15, 2013
72	21	"The Inherited Cloth! The Birth of Equuleus Subaru!"; Transliteration: "Kurosu, Keishō! Ekureusu no Subaru, Tanjō!" (Japanese: 聖衣（クロス）、継承！小馬座（エクレウス）の昴、誕生！)	September 22, 2013
73	22	"Tears of Equuleus!? Awakening Two Cloths!"; Transliteration: "Ekureusu no Namida!? Kakusei-suru Futatsu no Kurosu!" (Japanese: 小馬座（エクレウス）の涙!?覚醒する二つの聖衣（クロス）！)	September 29, 2013
74	23	"Kiki's Battle! The Friends That Surpass Generations!"; Transliteration: "Kiki no Tatakai! Sedai o Koeta Nakama!" (Japanese: 貴鬼の闘い！世代を越えた仲間！)	October 6, 2013
75	24	"The Destined Encounter! The Return of Gemini!"; Transliteration: "Sadame no Kaigō! Jemini, Futatabi!" (Japanese: 定めの邂逅！双子座（ジェミニ）、再び！)	October 13, 2013
76	25	"The Legendary Bird! Phoenix Ikki Arrives!"; Transliteration: "Fushichō! Fenikkusu no Ikki, Kenzan!" (Japanese: 不死鳥！鳳凰座（フェニックス）の一輝、見参！)	October 20, 2013
77	26	"Move Time! Athena's Saints Gather!"; Transliteration: "Toki yo Ugoke! Tsudoishi Atena no Seinto!" (Japanese: 刻よ動け！集いしアテナの聖闘士（セイント）！)	October 27, 2013
78	27	"The Deciding Battle Begins! To Determine the Fate of the Goddesses!"; Transliteration: "Kessen no Hajimari! Shukumei no Megami no Moto e!" (Japanese: 決戦の始まり！宿命の女神のもとへ！)	November 3, 2013
79	28	"The Offense and Defense Assassin! Shun's Secret Chain!"; Transliteration: "Kōbō Ittai no Shikaku! Shun, Hisaku no Chēn!" (Japanese: 攻防一体の刺客！瞬、秘策の鎖（チェーン）！)	November 10, 2013
80	29	"The King of Time! Hyoga's Absolute Zero Air!"; Transliteration: "Toki no Ō! Hyōga, Zettai Reido no Tōki!" (Japanese: 時の王！氷河、絶対零度の凍気！)	November 24, 2013
81	30	"Putting On the Chronotector! The Four Heavenly Kings' Attack!"; Transliteration: "Kuronotekutā Sōchaku! Shiten'ō no Shōgeki!" (Japanese: 刻衣（クロノテクター）装着！四天王の衝撃！)	December 1, 2013
82	31	"The Peak Fighting Spirit! Ikki vs. Aegaeon!"; Transliteration: "Tōshi no Kiwami! Ikki tai Aigaion!" (Japanese: 闘志の極み！一輝対アイガイオン！)	December 8, 2013
83	32	"Shiryū and Ryūhō! Spirit of the Five Old Peaks!"; Transliteration: "Shiryū to Ryūhō! Gorōhō no Tamashii!" (Japanese: 紫龍と龍峰！五老峰の魂！)	December 15, 2013
84	33	"The Approaching Shadow! The Gold Saints Protecting Athena!"; Transliteration: "Semaru Kage! Atena Mamorishi Gōrudo Seinto!" (Japanese: 迫る影！アテナ守りし黄金聖闘士（ゴールドセイント）！)	December 22, 2013
85	34	"Fighting Destiny! The Confession of Rebellion!"; Transliteration: "Unmei ni Aragae! Hangyaku no Kokuhaku!" (Japanese: 運命に抗え！反逆の告白！)	January 5, 2014
86	35	"The Secret of the Cloths! A New Power Is Activated!"; Transliteration: "Kurosu no Himitsu! Hatsudō-suru Aratana Chikara!" (Japanese: 聖衣（クロス）の秘密！発動する新たな力！)	January 12, 2014
87	36	"The Gold Union! The Forbidden Mystery!"; Transliteration: "Gōrudo Danketsu! Kinjirareta Ōgi!" (Japanese: 黄金（ゴールド）団結！禁じられた奥義！)	January 19, 2014
88	37	"The Remaining Determination! The Great Saints' Teachings!"; Transliteration: "Nokosareta Ishi! Ōinaru Seinto no Oshie!" (Japanese: 残された意志！大いなる聖闘士（セイント）の教え！)	January 26, 2014
89	38	"Awaken! The Ultimate Omega!"; Transliteration: "Mezamero! Kyūkyoku no Omega!" (Japanese: 目覚めろ！究極のΩ（オメガ）！)	February 2, 2014
90	39	"Taurus Charge!! Reaching Pallas's Chamber!"; Transliteration: "Taurusu Tosshin!! Tōsatsu, Parasu no Ma!" (Japanese: 牡牛（タウルス）突進!!到達、パラスの間！)	February 9, 2014
91	40	"Athena and Pallas! Showdown of the Goddesses!"; Transliteration: "Atena to Parasu! Megami no Kessen!" (Japanese: アテナとパラス！女神の決戦！)	February 16, 2014
92	41	"Seiya's True Feelings! The Lie From His Return!"; Transliteration: "Seiya no Honshin! Itsuwari kara no Kikan!" (Japanese: 星矢の本心！偽りからの帰還！)	February 23, 2014
93	42	"The God of Time! The Ascent of Saturn!"; Transliteration: "Toki no Kami! Satān Kōrin!" (Japanese: 刻の神！サターン降臨！)	March 2, 2014
94	43	"Fighter of Hope! The Ties That Bind Saints!"; Transliteration: "Kibō no Tōshi! Seinto no Kizuna!" (Japanese: 希望の闘士！聖闘士（セイント）の絆！)	March 9, 2014
95	44	"Overcome the God! Seiya's Cosmo!"; Transliteration: "Kami o Koero! Seiya no Kosumo!" (Japanese: 神を超えろ！星矢の小宇宙（コスモ）！)	March 16, 2014
96	45	"The Final Battle! Go, Omega Saints!"; Transliteration: "Saigo no Tatakai! Yuke, Omega no Seinto!" (Japanese: 最後の闘い！ゆけ、Ω（オメガ）の聖闘士（セイント）！)	March 23, 2014
97	46	"The End of the Battle! Become a Legend, Koga!"; Transliteration: "Tatakai no Hate! Kōga yo, Densetsu to Nare!" (Japanese: 闘いの果て！光牙よ、伝説となれ！)	March 30, 2014
