= Project.R =

Japanese musical group

- Origin: Japan
- Genres: Anison
- Years active: 2007–present
- Label: Nippon Columbia
- Members: Hideyuki Takahashi; Takayoshi Tanimoto; Sister MAYO; Takafumi Iwasaki; Hideaki Takatori; Akiko Wada; Psychic Lover; Tsuyoshi Matsubara; Saki Oshitani; Showgo Kamada; Yohei Onishi; Zetki; Kenichiro Ohishi; Hiroaki Kagoshima; Katsuyuki Miyaba; Mike Sugiyama; Megumi Ohashi; Hiroshi Takaki; Kazunori Miyake; Kousuke Yamashita; Koichiro Kameyama; Morihiro Suzuki
- Past members: NoB

Project.R (プロジェクト・ドット・アール, Purojekuto Dotto Āru) are a Japanese musical ensemble established by Nippon Columbia and Toei Company to perform on the soundtracks for the Super Sentai Series beginning with Engine Sentai Go-onger.

For the various series, Columbia has taken various popular vocalists of anime songs and brought them together in a group called Project.R (the "R" stands for "Ranger"). The opening and ending themes and the insert songs are performed by individual members or a subset of members of Project.R. Several songs are performed by long standing theme song singers who are not included as being members of Project.R (the songs are composed by Project.R members, though). These artists are Shinichi Ishihara, MoJo, Akira Kushida, Takayuki Miyauchi, Koji Onoda, Ichirou Mizuki, and Make-Up.

== Members ==
=== Performing members ===
- Hideyuki Takahashi (高橋 秀幸, Takahashi Hideyuki)
  - Takahashi made his debut as a member of Project.R singing the Engine Sentai Go-onger and Tokumei Sentai Go-Busters opening themes.
- Takayoshi Tanimoto (谷本 貴義, Tanimoto Takayoshi)
  - Tanimoto was the vocalist of the Juken Sentai Gekiranger opening theme and Ressha Sentai ToQger ending theme.
- Sister MAYO
  - Sister MAYO was the vocalist of the Mahou Sentai Magiranger and Kishiryu Sentai Ryusoulger ending theme.
- NoB (†)
  - NoB was a member and vocalist of 1980s rock band Make-Up. He made his solo debut as the vocalist of the GoGo Sentai Boukenger and Tensou Sentai Goseiger opening themes.
- Takafumi Iwasaki (岩崎 貴文, Iwasaki Takafumi)
  - Iwasaki composed the Bakuryū Sentai Abaranger opening theme before debuting as the vocalist of the Mahou Sentai Magiranger opening theme.
- Hideaki Takatori (高取 ヒデアキ, Takatori Hideyuki)
  - Takatori was the vocalist of the Ninpuu Sentai Hurricaneger and Doubutsu Sentai Zyuohger opening themes, as well as the Samurai Sentai Shinkenger and Zyuden Sentai Kyoryuger ending themes.
- Mayumi Gojo (武田 鉄矢, Gojō Mayumi)
  - Gojo performed songs for the Pretty Cure series before performing vocals on the Magiranger image song "Eien ni…" (永遠に…; "Eternally…").
- Psychic Lover (サイキックラバー, Saikikku Rabā)
  - Composed of vocalist YOFFY and guitarist IMAJO, Psychic Lover performed the Tokusou Sentai Dekaranger and Samurai Sentai Shinkenger opening themes.
- Tsuyoshi Matsubara (松原 剛志, Matsubara Tsuyoshi)
  - Matsubara is a former member of Ultra Series vocal group Project DMM and was vocalist for the Samurai Sentai Shinkenger image song "Rokunin no Samurai" (六人の侍; "Six Samurai") before performing the Kaizoku Sentai Gokaiger opening theme and Uchu Sentai Kyuranger ending theme.
- Saki Oshitani (押谷 沙樹, Oshitani Saki)
  - Oshitani previously performed the B-side "Over the Star" on the Dragon Ball Z Kai single "Yeah! Break! Care! Break!" before performing as one of the many vocalists on the Gokaiger ending theme.
- Showgo Kamada (鎌田 章吾, Kamada Shōgo)
  - Kamada was the vocalist of the Zyuden Sentai Kyoryuger opening theme and Ressha Sentai ToQger ending theme.
- Yohei Onishi (大西 洋平, Ōnishi Yōhei)
  - Onishi was the vocalist of the Shuriken Sentai Ninninger and Mashin Sentai Kiramager opening themes and Doubutsu Sentai Zyuohger ending theme.
- Zetki (Z旗, Zettoki)
  - Zetki is a Japanese jazz band fronted by Hideaki Takatori on vocals and includes Hiroaki Kagoshima on piano. They had performed the backtrack on the Samurai Sentai Shinkenger ending theme.

=== Non-performing members ===
- Kenichiro Ohishi (大石 憲一郎, Ōishi Ken'ichirō)
  - The leader of Project.R, Ohishi had been an arranger for Psychic Lover and made his composing and arranging debuts on the Go-onger ending themes.
- Hiroaki Kagoshima (籠島 裕昌, Kagoshima Hiroaki)
  - Kagoshima arranged the Hurricaneger ending theme before arranging the Shinkenger and Gokaiger ending themes.
- Katsuyuki Miyaba (宮葉 勝行, Miyaba Katsuyuki)
  - Miyaba was a composer on the Chojin Sentai Jetman and Abaranger soundtracks and a mixer on the Denji Sentai Megaranger soundtracks.
- Mike Sugiyama (マイクスギヤマ, Maiku Sugiyama)
  - Sugiyama wrote several songs in Doraemon and Macross Frontier before writing the Go-onger themes.
- Megumi Ohashi (大橋 恵, Ōhashi Megumi)
  - Ohashi composed and arranged the Abaranger soundtracks as a member of Kentarō Haneda with Healthy Wings.
- Hiroshi Takaki (高木 洋, Takaki Hiroshi)
  - Takaki composed and arranged the Abaranger soundtracks as a member of Kentarō Haneda with Healthy Wings.
- Kazunori Miyake (三宅 一徳, Miyake Kazunori)
  - Miyaki had written and arranged various insert songs in Gekisou Sentai Carranger and also composed and arranged the Hurricaneger and Gekiranger soundtracks; he arranged the Gekiranger ending theme.
- Kousuke Yamashita (山下 康介, Yamashita Kōsuke)
  - Yamashita was a composer and arranger on the Abaranger soundtracks as a member of Kentarō Haneda with Healthy Wings and made his composing and arranging debuts on the Magiranger soundtracks.
- Koichiro Kameyama (亀山 耕一郎, Kameyama Kōichirō)
  - Kameyama was a composer and arranger of various insert songs in Carranger, Megaranger and Seiju Sentai Gingaman before composing and arranging the Mirai Sentai Timeranger and Dekaranger soundtracks.
- Morihiro Suzuki (鈴木 盛広, Suzuki Morihiro)
  - Suzuki wrote an insert song on the Go-onger soundtracks.

=== Non-members ===
- Shinichi Ishihara (石原 慎一, Ishihara Shin'ichi)
- MoJo
- Takayuki Miyauchi (宮内 タカユキ, Miyauchi Takayuki)
- Akira Kushida (串田 アキラ, Kushida Akira)
- Koji Onoda (小野田 浩二, Onoda Kōji)
  - Nippon Columbia enka singer
- Ichirou Mizuki (水木 一郎, Mizuki Ichirō)
- MAKE-UP
  - NoB's band
- Shintaro Wada (和田 慎太郎, Wada Shintarō)
  - Debut performance on Goseiger soundtracks
- Motomu Azaki (安崎 求, Azaki Motomu)
- Seiji Abe (安部 誠司, Abe Seiji)
- Isao Sasaki (ささき いさお, Sasaki Isao)
- Mitsuko Horie (堀江 美都子, Horie Mitsuko)
- Nazo no Shin Unit Starmen (謎の新ユニットSTA☆MEN, Nazo no Shin Yunitto Sutāmen)
  - Starmen is a band consisting of seven voice actors
    - Daisuke Kishio (岸尾 だいすけ, Kishio Daisuke)
    - Kenichi Suzumura (鈴村 健一, Suzumura Ken'ichi)
    - Junichi Suwabe (諏訪部 順一, Suwabe Jun'ichi)
    - Hiroki Takahashi (高橋 広樹, Takahashi Hiroki)
    - Kōsuke Toriumi (鳥海 浩輔, Toriumi Kōsuke)
    - Makoto Yasumura (保村 真, Yasumura Makoto)
    - Hiroyuki Yoshino (吉野 裕行, Yoshino Hiroyuki)

== Initial success ==
The single of the opening and ending themes of Engine Sentai Go-onger reached #4 on the Oricon Weekly Rankings Charts in its first week, selling 22,000 records. It is the first theme song single for any Super Sentai series to reach the Oricon's top ten list, reaching #3 on its first day of sale, March 19, 2008, and remaining in the top 20 for four weeks.&lt;ref>"炎神戦隊ゴーオンジャー：主題歌が戦隊シリーズ初のオリコン4位 33年目の快挙". Archived from the original on 2008-03-30.&lt;/ref>

== Discography ==
=== Engine Sentai Go-onger ===
- "Engine Sentai Go-onger Theme Song Single" (炎神戦隊ゴーオンジャー主題歌シングル, Enjin Sentai Gōonjā Shūdaika Shinguru) - March 19, 2008&lt;ref name="COCC-16071">"コロムビアミュージックエンタテインメント | 炎神戦隊ゴーオンジャー主題歌シングルCD【通常盤】".&lt;/ref>
- "Korochan Pack: Engine Sentai Go-onger" (コロちゃんパック 炎神戦隊ゴーオンジャー, Korochan Pakku Enjin Sentai Gōonjā) - April 30, 2008&lt;ref name="COCZ-1071">"コロムビアミュージックエンタテインメント | コロちゃんパック 炎神戦隊ゴーオンジャー".&lt;/ref>
- "Engine Sentai Go-onger 2nd Single: Engine Second Rap -TURBO CUSTOM-" (炎神戦隊ゴーオンジャー 2nd SINGLE 炎神セカンドラップ-TURBO CUSTOM-, Enjin Sentai Gōonjā Sekando Shinguru Enjin Sekando Rappu-Tābo Kasutamu-) - July 2, 2008&lt;ref>"コロムビアミュージックエンタテインメント | 炎神戦隊ゴーオンジャー 2nd SINGLE 炎神セカンドラップ-TURBO CUSTOM-".&lt;/ref>
- "Korochan Pack: Engine Sentai Go-onger 2" - July 2, 2008&lt;ref>"コロムビアミュージックエンタテインメント | コロちゃんパック 炎神戦隊ゴーオンジャー".&lt;/ref>
- "Engine With Play CD Book Engine Sentai Go-onger" (炎神おあそびCDブック「炎神戦隊ゴーオンジャー」, Enjin oasobi Shī Dī Bukku "Enjin Sentai Gōonjā"; July 30, 2008)&lt;ref>"コロムビアミュージックエンタテインメント | 炎神おあそびCDブック「炎神戦隊ゴーオンジャー」".&lt;/ref>
- "Korochan Pack: Engine Sentai Go-onger 3 - September 3, 2008&lt;ref>"コロムビアミュージックエンタテインメント | コロちゃんパック 炎神戦隊ゴーオンジャー".&lt;/ref>
- Engine Sentai Go-onger All Song Collection: Song Grand Prix (炎神戦隊ゴーオンジャー全曲集 ソンググランプリ, Enjin Sentai Gōonjā Zenkyokushū Songu Guranpuri) - January 14, 2009&lt;ref>"コロムビアミュージックエンタテインメント | 炎神戦隊ゴーオンジャー全曲集 ソンググランプリ《通常盤》".&lt;/ref>

=== Samurai Sentai Shinkenger ===
- "Samurai Sentai Shinkenger Theme Song Single" (侍戦隊シンケンジャー主題歌シングル, Samurai Sentai Shinkenjā Shūdaika Shinguru) - March 18, 2009&lt;ref>"コロムビアミュージックエンタテインメント | 侍戦隊シンケンジャー主題歌シングルCD【限定盤 秘伝動画からくり箱入り】".&lt;/ref>
- "Korochan Pack Samurai Sentai Shinkenger" (コロちゃんパック 侍戦隊シンケンジャー, Korochan Pakku Samurai Sentai Shinkenjā) - April 29, 2009&lt;ref name="COCZ-1080">"コロムビアミュージックエンタテインメント | コロちゃんパック 侍戦隊シンケンジャー".&lt;/ref>
- "Korochan Pack Samurai Sentai Shinkenger 2" - July 15, 2009&lt;ref name="COCZ-1084">"コロムビアミュージックエンタテインメント | コロちゃんパック 侍戦隊シンケンジャー". 2009-07-28.&lt;/ref>
- Samurai Sentai Shinkenger "Samurai CD Book" (侍戦隊シンケンジャー「サムライCDブック」, Samurai Sentai Shinkenjā "Samurai CD Bukku") - July 29, 2009&lt;ref name="COCZ-15287">"コロムビアミュージックエンタテインメント | 侍戦隊シンケンジャー「サムライCDブック」". 2009-07-28.&lt;/ref>
- "Korochan Pack Samurai Sentai Shinkenger 3" - August 19, 2009&lt;ref name="COCZ-1086">"コロムビアミュージックエンタテインメント | コロちゃんパック 侍戦隊シンケンジャー". 2009-07-28.&lt;/ref>
- Samurai Sentai Shinkenger Song Collection: (Final) Secret Musical Disk: Unification of Songs Under Providence (侍戦隊シンケンジャー全曲集 (完) 秘伝音盤 歌の天下統一, Samurai Sentai Shinkenjā Zenkyokushū (Kan) Hiden Onban Uta no Tenka Tōitsu) - February 10, 2010&lt;ref name="COCX-36025-6">"コロムビアミュージックエンタテインメント | 侍戦隊シンケンジャー全曲集 (完) 秘伝音盤 歌の天下統一". 2010-01-21.&lt;/ref>

=== Tensou Sentai Goseiger ===
- "Tensou Sentai Goseiger Theme Song Single" (天装戦隊ゴセイジャー主題歌シングル, Tensō Sentai Goseijā Shūdaika Shinguru) - March 17, 2010&lt;ref>"コロムビアミュージックエンタテインメント | 天装戦隊ゴセイジャー主題歌《完全初回限定生産》".&lt;/ref>
- "Tensou Sentai Goseiger New Ending Theme: Gotcha☆Goseiger TYPE 2 REMIX" (天装戦隊ゴセイジャー 新エンディング・テーマ ガッチャ☆ゴセイジャー TYPE 2 REMIX, Tensō Sentai Goseijā Shin Endingu Tēma: Gatcha Goseijā Taipu Tsū Rimikkusu) - April 21, 2010&lt;ref>"コロムビアミュージックエンタテインメント | 天装戦隊ゴセイジャー 新エンディング・テーマガッチャ☆ゴセイジャー TYPE 2 REMIX".&lt;/ref>
- "Korochan Pack Tensou Sentai Goseiger" (コロちゃんパック 天装戦隊ゴセイジャー, Korochan Pakku Tensō Sentai Goseijā)&lt;ref>"コロムビアミュージックエンタテインメント | コロちゃんパック 天装戦隊ゴセイジャー".&lt;/ref>/Tensou Sentai Goseiger Mini Album (天装戦隊ゴセイジャー ミニアルバム, Tensō Sentai Goseijā Mini Arubamu)&lt;ref>"コロムビアミュージックエンタテインメント | 天装戦隊ゴセイジャー ミニアルバム".&lt;/ref> - April 28, 2010
- "Korochan Pack Tensou Sentai Goseiger #2"&lt;ref>"コロムビアミュージックエンタテインメント | コロちゃんパック 天装戦隊ゴセイジャー(2)".&lt;/ref>/Tensou Sentai Goseiger Mini Album #2&lt;ref>"コロムビアミュージックエンタテインメント | 天装戦隊ゴセイジャー ミニアルバム(2)".&lt;/ref> - June 23, 2010
- Tensou Sentai Goseiger "Tensou CD Book" (てんそうCDブック, Tensō CD Bukku) - July 21, 2010&lt;ref>"コロムビアミュージックエンタテインメント | 天装戦隊ゴセイジャー「てんそうCDブック」".&lt;/ref>
- "Korochan Pack Tensou Sentai Goseiger" #3&lt;ref>"コロムビアミュージックエンタテインメント | コロちゃんパック 天装戦隊ゴセイジャー(3)".&lt;/ref>/Tensou Sentai Goseiger Mini Album #3&lt;ref>"コロムビアミュージックエンタテインメント | 天装戦隊ゴセイジャー ミニアルバム(3)".&lt;/ref> - August 18, 2010
- Tensou Sentai Goseiger Complete Song Collection: Super Songs Dynamic! (天装戦隊ゴセイジャー 全曲集 スーパーソングスダイナミック!, Tensō Senta Goseijā Zenkyokushū: Sūpā Songu Dainamikku!)&lt;ref>"日本コロムビア | 天装戦隊ゴセイジャー 全曲集 スーパーソングスダイナミック!".&lt;/ref> - December 29, 2010

=== Super Sentai Versus Series Theater ===
- "Versus! Super Sentai" (バーサス！スーパー戦隊, Bāsasu! Sūpā Sentai) - May 23, 2010&lt;ref>"コロムビアミュージックエンタテインメント | スーパー戦隊VSシリーズ劇場 テーマ曲".&lt;/ref>
  - Lyrics: Saburo Yatsude
  - Composition &amp; Arrangement: Hiroshi Takaki
  - Artist: Project.R (Hideaki Takatori, YOFFY, Takayoshi Tanimoto)

=== Kaizoku Sentai Gokaiger ===
- "Kaizoku Sentai Gokaiger Theme Song" (海賊戦隊ゴーカイジャー主題歌, Kaizoku Sentai Gōkaijā Shūdaika)&lt;ref>"コロムビアミュージックエンタテインメント | 海賊戦隊ゴーカイジャー主題歌《通常盤》".&lt;/ref> - March 2, 2011
- Mini Album Kaizoku Sentai Gokaiger (ミニアルバム 海賊戦隊ゴーカイジャー, Mini Arubamu Kaizoku Sentai Gōkaijā)&lt;ref>"日本コロムビア | ミニアルバム 海賊戦隊ゴーカイジャー".&lt;/ref>/Korochan Pack Kaizoku Sentai Gokaiger (コロちゃんパック 海賊戦隊ゴーカイジャー, Korochan Pakku Kaizoku Sentai Gōkaijā)&lt;ref>"日本コロムビア | コロちゃんパック 海賊戦隊ゴーカイジャー".&lt;/ref> - March 2, 2011
- Mini Album Kaizoku Sentai Gokaiger (2)&lt;ref>"日本コロムビア | ミニアルバム 海賊戦隊ゴーカイジャー(2)".&lt;/ref>/Korochan Pack Kaizoku Sentai Gokaiger (2)&lt;ref>"日本コロムビア | コロちゃんパック 海賊戦隊ゴーカイジャー(2)".&lt;/ref> - June 22, 2011
- Mini Album Kaizoku Sentai Gokaiger (3)&lt;ref>"日本コロムビア | ミニアルバム 海賊戦隊ゴーカイジャー(3)".&lt;/ref>/Korochan Pack Kaizoku Sentai Gokaiger (3)&lt;ref>"日本コロムビア | コロちゃんパック 海賊戦隊ゴーカイジャー(3)".&lt;/ref> - June 22, 2011
- Kaizoku Sentai Gokaiger Complete Song Collection: Kanzen Otakara Song Box (海賊戦隊ゴーカイジャー 全曲集 KANZEN お宝ソングボックス, Kaizoku Sentai Gōkaijā Zenkyokushū KANZEN Otakara Songu Bokkusu)&lt;ref>"日本コロムビア | 海賊戦隊ゴーカイジャー 全曲集 KANZEN お宝ソングボックス".&lt;/ref> - February 22, 2012

=== Tokumei Sentai Go-Busters ===
- "Tokumei Sentai Go-Busters Theme Song Single" (特命戦隊ゴーバスターズ主題歌シングル, Tokumei Sentai Gōbasutāzu Shūdaika Shinguru)&lt;ref>"日本コロムビア | 特命戦隊ゴーバスターズ主題歌《通常盤》".&lt;/ref> - February 29, 2012
- Mini Album Tokumei Sentai Go-Busters (ミニアルバム 特命戦隊ゴーバスターズ, Mini Arubamu Tokumei Sentai Gōbasutāzu)&lt;ref>"日本コロムビア | ミニアルバム 特命戦隊ゴーバスターズ".&lt;/ref>/Korochan Pack Tokumei Sentai Go-Busters (コロちゃんパック 特命戦隊ゴーバスターズ, Korochan Pakku Tokumei Sentai Gōbasutāzu)&lt;ref>"日本コロムビア | コロちゃんパック 特命戦隊ゴーバスターズ".&lt;/ref> - April 25, 2012
- Mini Album Tokumei Sentai Go-Busters (2) (ミニアルバム 特命戦隊ゴーバスターズ (2), Mini Arubamu Tokumei Sentai Gōbasutāzu (2))&lt;ref>"日本コロムビア | ミニアルバム 特命戦隊ゴーバスターズ(2)".&lt;/ref>/Korochan Pack Tokumei Sentai Go-Busters (2) (コロちゃんパック 特命戦隊ゴーバスターズ (2), Korochan Pakku Tokumei Sentai Gōbasutāzu (2))&lt;ref>"日本コロムビア | コロちゃんパック 特命戦隊ゴーバスターズ(2)".&lt;/ref> - June 27, 2012
- Mini Album Tokumei Sentai Go-Busters (3) (ミニアルバム 特命戦隊ゴーバスターズ (3), Mini Arubamu Tokumei Sentai Gōbasutāzu (3))&lt;ref>"日本コロムビア | ミニアルバム 特命戦隊ゴーバスターズ(3)".&lt;/ref>/Korochan Pack Tokumei Sentai Go-Busters (3) (コロちゃんパック 特命戦隊ゴーバスターズ (3), Korochan Pakku Tokumei Sentai Gōbasutāzu (3))&lt;ref>"日本コロムビア | コロちゃんパック 特命戦隊ゴーバスターズ(3)".&lt;/ref> - August 22, 2012
- Tokumei Sentai Go-Busters: Character Song Album (特命戦隊ゴーバスターズ キャラクターソング アルバム, Tokumei Sentai Gōbasutāzu Kyarakutā Songu Arubamu)&lt;ref>"日本コロムビア &amp;#124; 特命戦隊ゴーバスターズ キャラクターソング アルバム". Columbia.jp. 2012-12-26.&lt;/ref> - December 26, 2012
- Tokumei Sentai Go-Busters Song Collection: Complete Song File (特命戦隊ゴーバスターズ 全曲集 コンプリート ソング ファイル, Tokumei Sentai Gōbasutāzu Zenkyokushū Konpurīto Songu Fairu)&lt;ref>"日本コロムビア &amp;#124; 特命戦隊ゴーバスターズ 全曲集 コンプリート ソング ファイル". Columbia.jp.&lt;/ref> - February 13, 2013
