= Pegasus Fantasy =

Single by Make-Up

from the album Saint Seiya Hit Song Collection
- A-side: "Pegasus Fantasy"
- B-side: "Blue Forever"
- Released: October 21, 1986
- Genre: Hard rock, anison
- Label: Columbia

Make-Up singles chronology
"GET THE HERO / GO FOR TOMORROW" (1986)	"Pegasus Fantasy" (1986)	"Pegasus Fantasy (2009 ver.) / Blue Forever (2009 ver.)" (2009)

"Pegasus Fantasy" (ペガサス幻想(ファンタジー), Pegasasu Fantajī) is a song by Japanese metal band Make-Up. Serving as the band's fourth major release single, "Pegasus Fantasy" and its B-side, "Blue Forever" (永遠ブルー, Eien Burū), were used as the opening and ending theme songs for the first half of the original Saint Seiya anime. "Pegasus Fantasy" became Make-Up's most successful release, and they have re-released the song several times since its initial release in 1986. After releasing a "21st century ver." on their mini-album The Voice from Yesterday, Make-Up released a new version of the song in 2012, subtitled "Version Omega", which features Shoko Nakagawa, the voice actress for Athena, on guest vocals and is used as the opening theme song for the re-imagined Saint Seiya Omega anime. "Pegasus Fantasy Version Omega" reached number 29 on the Oricon's weekly rankings. Masami Kurumada, the author of the Saint Seiya manga, has included "Pegasus Fantasy" in the manga, with a background character seen singing it. It also appeared in Taiko no Tatsujin: Drum 'n' Fun!.

== Cover versions ==
Since its release, "Pegasus Fantasy" has been covered by several artists and bands, including Animetal on their albums Animetal Marathon V and Decade of Bravehearts, Animetal USA on their debut self-titled album, Eizo Sakamoto on Eizo Japan 1, Takeshi Tsuruno on Tsuruno Uta, Sadie on V-Anime Rocks, Trick or Treat on Re-Animated, and Italian power metal band Derdian as a bonus track on the Japanese release of their album Limbo. Mary's Blood recorded a cover of the song for their 2020 cover album Re>Animator. Their vocalist Eye sung it as a duet with Make-Up's vocalist NoB, who had been her vocal coach for the last ten years. The song has been translated into various languages for the localized dubs of the anime; the Brazilian Portuguese version of the song features Edu Falaschi, former lead singer of power metal band Angra, covering the song. According to Falaschi, his version was originally a demo that was placed on-air without his knowledge, explaining the "crummy" quality of the final product.

Knights of the Zodiac: Saint Seiya utilized the English version (titled "Pegasus Seiya") by The Struts for the opening.
