= Runa Natsui =

Japanese actress and model (born 1995)

- 夏居 瑠奈
- Born: November 7, 1995 (age 30); Tokyo, Japan
- Occupations: Actress; Model
- Years active: 2007–2017

Runa Natsui (夏居 瑠奈, Natsui Runa; born November 7, 1995) is a Japanese actress and model best known for playing the role of Kaoru Shiba in the TV show Samurai Sentai Shinkenger.

== Filmography ==
- Watashi ga Kodomo datta Koro (NHK-BShi, 2007) as Eriko Furuhashi
- Otoko no Kosodate (TV Asahi, 2007) as Rinko Yano
- Seigi no Mikata (Nippon TV, 2008, Episodes 1 - 3) as Makiko Nakata (Young)
- Samurai Sentai Shinkenger (TV Asahi, 2009 - 2010) as Kaoru Shiba
- Kaizoku Sentai Gokaiger (TV Asahi, 2011 - 2012, Episodes 11 & 12) as Kaoru Shiba
- Don Quixote (NTV, 2011, Episode 8) as Takako Iwakura (Young)
- Kamen Rider Fourze (TV Asahi, 2011 - 2012, Episodes 30 - 32) as Mei Shirakawa
- Radio (NHK, 2013) as Emi Okazaki
- Kaigo Helper Shiuko no Jikenbo 2 (TV Tokyo, 2013) as Aya Narita
- Yo ni mo Kimyō na Monogatari: Spring 2014 Special (Fuji TV, 2014) as Student
- Tenshi no Knife (Wowow, 2015) as Yuri Katō
- Kamen Rider Ex-Aid (TV Asahi, 2016 - 2017, Episode 4) as Riko Nishiwaki

=== Films ===
- Buta ga Ita Kyōshitsu (2008) as Runa Nanami
- Tensou Sentai Goseiger vs. Shinkenger: Epic on Ginmaku (2011) as Kaoru Shiba
- Utopia Sounds (2012)
- Aku no Kyōten (2012) as Fuuko Onodera
- Tokumei Sentai Go-Busters vs. Kaizoku Sentai Gokaiger: The Movie (2013) as Kaoru Shiba
- Kotodama – Spiritual Curse (2014) as Miharu
- Death Forest 3 (2015) as Hiroko Tagami
