= Saint Seiya Omega =

Japanese anime television series

- Cover of the first volume of the DVD release by Bandai Visual featuring Pegasus Koga and Sagittarius Seiya.
- 聖闘士星矢(セイントセイヤ)Ω(オメガ)
- Genre: Mythic fiction
- Based on: Saint Seiya by Masami Kurumada
- Written by: Reiko Yoshida (S1); Yoshimi Narita (S2)
- Directed by: Morio Hatano (S1); Tatsuya Nagamine (S2–P1); Kōhei Kureta (S2–P2)
- Voices of: Hikaru Midorikawa; Satsuki Yukino; Katsuyuki Konishi; Tetsuya Kakihara; Tatsuhisa Suzuki; Jun'ichi Suwabe
- Music by: Toshihiko Sahashi
- Country of origin: Japan
- Original language: Japanese
- No. of seasons: 2
- No. of episodes: 97 (list of episodes)

Production
- Producers: Gō Wakabayashi; Tomoharu Matsuhisa (S1); Toshiyuki Matsui (S1); Atsutoshi Umezawa (S2); Tomohiro Tsuji (S2)
- Editor: Kenta Katase
- Production companies: TV Asahi; Toei Animation

Original release
- Network: ANN (TV Asahi)
- Release: April 1, 2012 – March 30, 2014

Related
Further information
Video game
Ultimate Cosmo
Developer	Digital Works
Publisher	Namco Bandai Games
Designed by	Yoshihiko Umakoshi
Music by	Yoshiaki Hori
Platform	PlayStation Portable
Released	November 29, 2012
Manga
Written by	Bau
Published by	Kadokawa Shoten
Magazine	Kerokero Ace
Original run	March 26, 2013 – July 26, 2013
Volumes	1

Saint Seiya Omega (聖闘士星矢(セイントセイヤ)Ω(オメガ), Seinto Seiya Omega; stylized as Saint Seiya Ω) is an anime series produced by Toei Animation. It is a spin-off of the Saint Seiya anime series written and illustrated by Masami Kurumada, produced in commemoration of the 25th anniversary of the franchise. The series began broadcasting in Japan on TV Asahi on April 1, 2012.

The series follows a young teenager known as Koga who becomes one of the 88 warriors protecting the Goddess Athena known as Saints. As the Pegasus Bronze Saint, Koga embarks on a journey to increase his power to save Athena while meeting some other Saints. For the second season, the series tells the conflict between Athena and her sister Pallas which starts a new holy war. The series also got a manga adaptation and a fighting game.

Omega was created as an alternative to the manga series' direct sequel Saint Seiya: Next Dimension due to lack of material to adapt. As a result, rather than refocusing on the returning cast, Toei created a new generation of Saints who would succeed the old cast. Critical reception to the series has been mixed with critics often finding it derivative from other shows from the same genre.

== Plot ==
The storyline of Omega takes place 25 years after the Holy Wars of the 20th century against the god Hades narrated in the original manga and its anime adaptation. The goddess Athena is still on Earth after reincarnating to continue her duty of protecting peace against several antagonistic deities. Athena and a new generation of Saints prepare to face new threats that lurks in this new era, in which Pegasus Seiya, the main protagonist of Kurumada's manga and anime series, is revered as a Legendary Saint and one of Athena's Gold Saints.

The first part of the series is the "Chapter Mars" (マルス編, Marusu Hen), introducing the new Pegasus Bronce Saint Koga and his friends Bronce Saints Dragon Ryuhou, Lionet Souma, Wolf Haruto, Aquila Yuna and Aria, and the beginning of their fight against the God of War Mars in his quest to capture Aria to become the new Athena. The second part is the "Zodiac Temples Saga" (十二宮編, Jūnikyū Hen), featuring Koga and his friends who decides to fight against the many Gold Saints who have aligned themselves with Mars in their fight to save Athena before it is too late, eventually being accompanied by Orion Eden.

The second season begins the "Chapter New Cloth" (新生聖衣(ニュークロス)編, Nyū Kurosu Hen), introducing Athena's new enemy Pallas and her Pallasite warriors, a new ally in the Steel Saint Subaru, and new powers with their stronger New Cloths. The second half of season 2 comprises the "Chapter Ω Awakening" (Ω(オメガ)覚醒編, Omega Kakusei Hen), where Athena and her many Saints take their war with Pallas to her stronghold Pallasvelda, where Pallas's elite Pallasites begin to conspire against her.

=== Characters ===
As an installment separate from Kurumada's work, the series will introduce characters new to the Saint Seiya fictional universe, that will make use of elements already established within it. Some of them, such as the deities, exist in the original manga. Additionally, known elements from Saint Seiya, such as the Cloths, the armors worn by the Saints, bear their known constellations, but are presented in Omega with a new design that differs substantially from those in the original source material, and departing from it, the Cloths emerge from jewels worn by the characters to envelop their bodies, which are known in Omega as ClothStones (クロストーン, Kurosutōn).

The Cosmo essence, one of the basic concepts of Saint Seiya, is expanded in Omega with the addition of specific elemental properties: Fire (火, Hi), Wind (風, Kaze), Thunder (雷, Kaminari), Earth (土, Tsuchi), Water (水, Mizu), Darkness (闇, Yami) and Light (光, Hikari).

In the second season, several Saints including the main characters have their cloths upgraded, sporting a new design much more reminiscent of Kurumada's original designs, and are stored in special boxes like in the original continuity.

== Production ==
Originally, Toei planned to make an anime adaptation of the manga Saint Seiya: Next Dimension but the series' slow pace of release resulted in them trying the opposite of Next Dimension: A story set several years after the events of the original manga. For this they created a new cast of main characters who would be assisted by the previous generation's Saints.

The creative staff, including character designer Umakoshi and head writer Reiko Yoshida, previously worked under flagship Saint Seiya director Shigeyasu Yamauchi, either on the original Saint Seiya anime adaptation (director Morio Hatano was assistant director of its fifth film), or on his other works, such as Mushiking: Mori no Tami no Densetsu and Casshern Sins. They referred to Yamauchi as a strong influence in interviews.

== Media ==
=== Anime ===
Omega was renewed for a second season which started airing on April 7, 2013.

Crunchyroll announced on March 30, 2012, that they had acquired the rights to stream the show online with English subtitles in the United States, Canada, the United Kingdom, Ireland, South Africa, Australia, and New Zealand, and have since continued to post new episodes online shortly after they air on TV in Japan.

Toei Animation describes it as an "original anime story", separate from the continuity of Kurumada's manga. Original Saint Seiya author Kurumada is not involved in the creative process of Omega, thus he is credited as the original creator of the series' concept.

=== Manga ===
In February 2012, it was announced that the Omega animated series would be adapted to manga form, and it started serialization on March 26, 2013, in Kadokawa Shoten's Kerokero Ace magazine. The comic book contains the arcs of the first season and it also adapted the second season. Its only tankōbon volume was released on September 23, 2013.

=== Related merchandise ===
Bandai released a fighting game titled Saint Seiya Omega - Ultimate Cosmo on November 29, 2012, for the PlayStation Portable. Additionally, the release of a set of chibi PVC figures portraying the Bronze Saints, has been announced. A line of articulated figures by Bandai under the name S.H. Figuarts was also announced, with Pegasus Kōga as the first character to be released. Although a prototype of the second figure in the line, Orion Eden, was created and displayed, it was ultimately never released, with the entire line cancelled thereafter.

Also from Bandai, a set of playing cards titled Saint Seiya Omega, for their Crusade Card System series has been announced for a June 2012 release

Additionally, the first release of Saint Seiya Omega on DVD and Blu-ray disc was set for August 24, 2012. Each volume will include four episodes.

More related merchandise has been revealed in Toei Animation's website for Omega, including t-shirts and a set of character badges, also, a lottery card game titled Sacred Lottery, for an upcoming release.

Also, a CD single containing the theme song for Omega has been released, containing two songs, "Pegasus Fantasy ver. Ω" and "Get the Future", both in normal and karaoke versions.

== Reception ==
Critical reception to the series has been mixed with critics often finding it derivative from other shows from the same genre. Bamboo Dong from Anime News Network said "Saint Seiya Omega is your archetypal hero tale, in which someone finds his true calling for justice, and together, he and his friends band together, embrace friendship, and vanquish evil from the world." Fandom Post's Sean Connolly "Saint Seiya Omega is a good entry point into the franchise for those who have never tried it out." Like Dong, Connolly found the series derivative of the genre but noted it had potential to be entertaining.

Victoria Holden from Otaku USA listed Omega as her favorite anime from 2012 noting that despite its lighter elements, different character designs and comedic elements, she enjoys the characterization from the main cast in their growth into Saints. The updated character designs and the new elements not seen in the classic series made Holden note that Omega managed to attract a new generation of fans. Seiya's voice actor, Toru Furuya, commented that thanks to Omega's success in Japan, several new projects related with Saint Seiya would begin.

=== International broadcast ===
- (Mexico) : Canal 5
- (Malaysia) : Ntv7
- (Indonesia) : RTV
