= Nobuo Yamada =

Japanese singer (1964–2025)

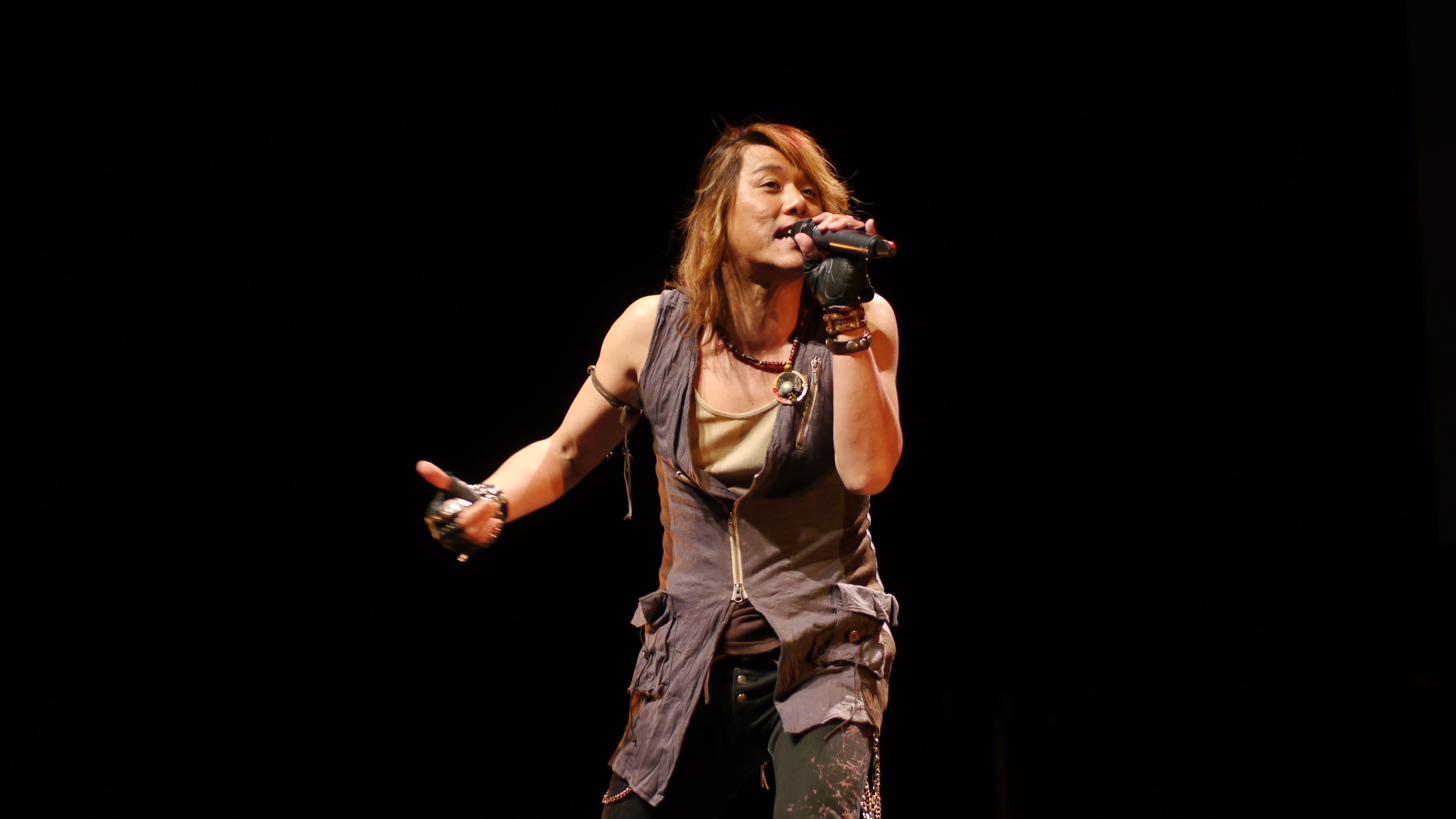
- Yamada performing in 2013

Background information
- Also known as: NoB
- Born: January 20, 1964; Osaka Prefecture, Japan
- Died: August 9, 2025 (aged 61)
- Genres: Hard rock; heavy metal; anison
- Occupation: Singer
- Instruments: Vocals
- Years active: 1983–2025
- Formerly of: Make-Up; Project.R
- Website: www.nobuo-yamada.net

Nobuo Yamada (Japanese: 山田 信夫, Hepburn: Yamada Nobuo; January 20, 1964 – August 9, 2025), also known by the name NoB, was a Japanese singer. He was the lead singer of the rock band Make-Up and a member of Project.R.

== Career ==
Yamada formed Make-Up in 1983, and recorded four studio albums with the band. Several of their songs were used in the Saint Seiya anime, including the first opening theme, "Pegasus Fantasy", which he composed and wrote the lyrics for, and the first ending theme, "Blue Forever". The songs were included on the albums Saint Seiya Hits I and Saint Seiya '96 Song Collection. He also recorded the song "Never" for the Saint Seiya film Heaven Chapter ~ Overture.

In 1983, Yamada provided vocals to Loudness drummer Munetaka Higuchi's first solo album, Destruction ~Hakai Gaisenroku~, and to Human Transport, an album by the band M.T. Fuji, which was a side-project of multiple different Loudness members. He formed the Urusakute Gomenne Band (うるさくてゴメンねBAND) in 1986 with former Oz members Carmen Maki and Yoshihiro Naruse, future B'z guitarist Tak Matsumoto, and Daddy Takechiyo & Tokyo Otoboke Cats drummer Soul Toul. They released a live album the following year.

In 1998, Yamada formed P.A.F. with X Japan guitarist Pata. According to Pata, he was planning to work as a solo artist and initially only had Yamada help by writing lyrics and providing temporary vocals for demos. Then while recording and wondering who should sing, the guitarist realized he should just ask Nob to be an official member. The duo is named after P.A.F. guitar pickups. They released two studio albums, one mini-album, one live album, and two singles.

Yamada sung several songs for the Super Sentai series; an insert song for Mahō Sentai Magiranger (2005), and theme songs for GoGo Sentai Boukenger (2006), Tensou Sentai Goseiger (2010), and Super Sentai Strongest Battle (2019).

In July 2007, Yamada performed alongside Hironobu Kageyama, Masaaki Endoh, Yoko Ishida, Kōji Wada, and MoJo at Anime Friends, an anime convention in Brazil. Afterward, he performed at Anime Friends and events in nearby cities, such as Fortaleza and Brasília. In 2009, Yamada formed Dr. Metal Factory with Earthshaker guitarist Shinichiro Ishihara. They released two albums in quick succession, featuring heavy metal covers of J-pop songs.

Yamada sang "Eat, Kill All" for the 2018 film Kamen Rider Amazons the Movie: The Last Judgement, and "Fight! Kemona Mask" for the anime series Kemono Michi: Rise Up. In 2020, he participated in Mary's Blood's heavy metal cover of "Pegasus Fantasy" for their 2020 cover album Re>Animator. He sang it as a duet with their lead vocalist Eye, whom he had coached as a vocalist for the last ten years.

== Illness and death ==
On February 25, 2025, Yamada announced that he had been diagnosed with kidney cancer in 2018. As a result, he cancelled his appearances at the Tarō Kobayashi Festival on March 8 and the "Saint Seiya 'Pegasus Fantasy' Grand Finale' in Mexico from March 29 to 30.

Yamada died at 1:39 PM (JST) on August 9, 2025, at the age of 61. His death was announced by his agency two days later.
