= Hideaki Takatori =

Japanese musician

- 高取 ヒデアキ(秀明)
- Born: March 4, 1967 (age 58); Tokyo, Japan
- Occupations: Singer, songwriter, composer
- Known for: anison genre contributions

Hideaki Takatori (高取 ヒデアキ(秀明), Takatori Hideaki) (born March 4, 1967) is a Japanese singer, songwriter, and composer from Tokyo, known for his contributions to the anison genre.

== Career ==
Takatori debuted in 1994 as vocalist for the band Weather Side. Four years later, as a member of the band COA with his younger brother Nobukazu Takatori, he performed the opening theme "Chase the Wind" of Grander Musashi RV. That marked Takatori's transition to anime and tokusatsu music.

His debut solo performance was the opening theme to Ninpuu Sentai Hurricaneger: "Hurricangers have Arrived!" (ハリケンジャー参上!, Harikenjā Sanjō!). This was followed by the Transformers: Armada opening "Transformers ~Steel Courage~" (TRANSFORMERS～鋼鉄の勇気～, Toransufōmā ~Kōtetsu no Yūki), the Sonic X opening "SONIC DRIVE", and the Kinnikuman II opening "Trust yourself".

His most recent recordings were the ending theme to Zyuden Sentai Kyoryuger "Everyone Gather! Kyoryuger" (みんな集まれ！キョウリュウジャー, Minna Atsumare! Kyōryūjā), the first opening theme to Yu-Gi-Oh! Zexal II "Unbreakable Heart", and the main theme from Doubutsu Sentai Zyuohger. He also wrote "Ima, Koko Kara", theme song from the movie Precure All-Stars: Haru no Carnival, which was recorded by idol group Morning Musume.

With his current band, Zetki, Takatori is also a member of Project.R, a Nippon Columbia and Toei Company ensemble tasked with performing songs for Super Sentai soundtracks.
