= Make-Up (Japanese band) =

Japanese hard rock band

- Also known as: Make-Up Project, M.U.P.
- Origin: Tokyo, Japan
- Genres: Heavy metal; hard rock
- Years active: 1983–1987 (Reunions: 1993, 2004, 2009)
- Label: Nippon Columbia
- Past members: Nobuo Yamada; Hiroaki Matsuzawa; Yasuyoshi Ikeda; Yōgo Kōno; Yoshihiro Toyokawa

Make-Up (stylized as MAKE—UP) was a Japanese hard rock and heavy metal band formed in 1983. The band became known in Japan for their work on the theme songs for the anime Saint Seiya.

== History ==
MAKE-UP was formed in 1983. The name "MAKE-UP" was originally the name of a band formed by Akira Takasaki and Munetaka Higuchi of LOUDNESS, which Hiroaki Matsuzawa took over.

In 1984 they performed their first show and released their first two albums: Howling Will and Straight Liner.

In 1985, they released their third album Born to Be Hard and their fourth and final album Rock Legend of Boys & Girls.

In 1986, the band was invited by Nippon Columbia to sing the Saint Seiya theme songs "Pegasus Fantasy" and "Blue Forever". "Pegasus Fantasy" came to be one of the most well-known anime opening songs of all time.

After the Saint Seiya: Hit Kyokushū I soundtrack album, the band split up and each member followed their own solo careers.

In 2004, Nippon Columbia released Memories of Blues: Make-Up 20th Anniversary, a box that included five CDs and a live DVD, but no new songs were recorded.

Nobuo Yamada, the vocalist of Make-Up, died from cancer in 2025.

== Band members ==
- Nobuo Yamada (山田信夫 Yamada Nobuo) - Vocals
- Hiroaki Matsuzawa (松澤 浩明 Matsuzawa Hiroaki) - Guitar
- Yasuyoshi Ikeda (池田 育義 Ikeda Yasuyoshi) - Bass
- Yōgo Kōno (河野 陽吾 Kōno Yōgo) - Keyboards
- Yoshihiro Toyokawa (豊川 義弘 Toyokawa Yoshihiro) - Drums

== Discography ==
Studio albums

- Howling Will (April 1, 1984)
- Straight Linet (October 21, 1984)
- Born to Be Hard (May 21, 1985)
- Rock Legend of Boys & Girls (December 21, 1985)

EPs

- The Voice from Yesterday (December 12, 2009)

Joint albums

- Rock Joint Bazzar with Grand Prix (March 21, 1993)

Compilation albums

- Glory Days: Make-Up Best Collection (August 1, 1989)
- Memories of Blues: Make-Up 20th Anniversary (December 1, 2004)
- Golden: Best of Make-Up (October 31, 2012)

Soundtrack albums

- Saint Seiya: Hit Kyokushū I with Mitsuko Horie (December 21, 1986)
- Saint Seiya '96: Song Collection (March 20, 1996)
- Saint Seiya: Complete Song Collection with various artists (November 21, 2002)
