= Yuichi Tsuchiya =

Japanese actor

- Born: February 6, 1979; Minami-Alps, Yamanashi, Japan
- Other name: 土屋 裕一
- Occupation: Actor

Yuichi Tsuchiya (土屋 裕一, Tsuchiya Yūichi; born February 6, 1979 in Minami-Alps, Yamanashi) is a Japanese actor and full-time member of the 4-man theatre troupe *pnish*. His nickname is "Tuti". He is best known for his stage roles as Shuichiro Oishi of the Prince of Tennis musical series, Tenimyu, and as Gin Ichimaru in the rock musical Bleach.

== Early life ==
Yuichi Tsuchiya grew up in the Akaishi Mountains region of Yamanashi Prefecture. He has a younger sister, and his mother Yumiko runs a beauty parlor. He is a graduate of Yamanashi Prefectural Koufu First High School.

== Early career ==
Tsuchiya's career as an actor is primarily that of a stage actor with occasional movie parts. His first few performances were in 1997 with a traveling theatre troupe, "Gekidan Geiyuuza". After one year with them he signed on with the theatre troupe BQMAP in 1998. He first appeared in one of their shows in July 1998, a production called Re-. He continued to perform with them until late 2000.

In early 2000 (concurrent with his involvement with BQMAP), Tsuchiya began to perform with a group called "ShiroxKuro". In June 2000 they put on their first performance, Best Team, following up in February 2001 with Set a Trap.

On July 1, 2001, ShiroxKuro renamed themselves *pnish*. The group has been involved in ten stage performances, their own radio program (which ended in June 2008) and their own weekly television show (Hottokenai! *pnish* TV). Tsuchiya was a member of the original nine-member troupe, which now consists of four performers.

== Tenimyu ==
Tsuchiya's major stage appearance came in 2003 when he originated the role of Shuichiro Oishi, the motherly vice-captain of Seigaku Middle School's tennis club, as part of the first generation Seigaku cast in Tenimyu, the Prince of Tennis musical series. He played the role from 2003 to 2005, and his character served as the emcee of the first Dream Live live concert. During his run on the series, he worked with fellow *pnish* actor Eiji Moriyama (who played Takeshi Momoshiro). Tsuchiya graduated from his role after the Side Fudomine musical; along with several other graduated Tenimyu actors, Tsuchiya got a cameo in the Prince of Tennis live film adaptation.

Since Tsuchiya left the Prince of Tennis the role of Oishi has been played by Hiroki Suzuki, Yukihiro Takiguchi, Yuya Toyoda, Yuki Tsujimoto, and is currently played by Jin Hiramaki.

Tsuchiya returned to his role as Oishi and reunite with the 1st generation Seigaku cast to perform in Tenimyu's Dream Live 7th to celebrate the end of Tenimyu's first season.

== Other roles ==
Tsuchiya stars as Gin Ichimaru in the rock musical Bleach, which has also featured some of his old Tenimyu castmates.

Tsuchiya played a double role in the Hunter x Hunter musical Hunter x Hunter: Nightmare of Zaoldyeck in 2002, where he worked with Prince of Tennis voice actors Kaida Yuki and Hiroki Takahashi. He portrayed Zebro the gatekeeper, as well as a butler.

== Career summary ==
=== Stage work ===
*pnish* performances

- Panic Rush, Panic Dance, Panic Nine, Panic Cafe, Panic Age, RokuAkuTou, Monster Box, Treasure Box, Wonder Box, Secret Box, Samurai Mode, all On performances, all Happy *pnish* Birthday performances, all Panic Room events (2001 to present).

Tenimyu, the Prince of Tennis musical series (as Shuichiro Oishi)

- The Prince of Tennis Musical (2003)
- The Prince of Tennis Musical: Remarkable 1st Match Fudomine (2003–2004)
- The Prince of Tennis Musical: Dream Live 1st (2004)
- The Prince of Tennis Musical: More Than Limit St. Rudolph Gakuen (2004)
- The Prince of Tennis Musical: Side Fudomine ~Special Match~ (2004–2005)
- The Prince of Tennis Musical: Dream Live 7th (2010)

Rock Musical Bleach (as Gin Ichimaru)

- Rock musical Bleach (August 2005)
- Rock musical Bleach: Saien (January 2006)
- Rock musical Bleach: The Dark of the Bleeding Moon (August 2006)
- Rock musical Bleach: The Live Bankai Show (January 2007)
- Rock musical Bleach: No Clouds in the Blue Heavens (March - April 2007)
- Rock musical Bleach: The All (March 2008)
- Rock musical Bleach: The Live Bankai Show code: 002 (March 2008)
- Rock musical Bleach: The Live Bankai Show code: 003 (January - February 2010)

Other theatre work

- Musical Hunter x Hunter: Nightmare of Zaoldyeck (2002)
- Sayonara no Love Song
- Suspense Musical Zipper
- Gekidan Dougaku Sensei's Sake Bocchan
- Gekidan Dougaku Sensei's Kyoudai Donburi
- BQMAP's Sentimental Tiger Case.01 ~ Sleeping Beauty
- Hageretto
- Etto, Oira wa Dare Dakke? ~ Cash On Delivery
- Akazaka Red Theater presents Kenran toka Ranman toka
- Aru Hi, Bokura wa Yume no Naka de Deau (September 2007)
- Gekidan Unit Keizai to H's Flowers (October 2007)

=== Movies ===
- The Prince of Tennis as Kite Eishirou
- Futari Ecchi: Triple Love as Akira Onoda

=== Television ===
- P-na Kanojo (TBS)
- Machi e Tobidasou - weekly performance as "Tsucchi" (NHK)
- Keitai Net Shakai no Otoshiana (NHK)
- 59th Proposal (Nihon TV)
- Dounichi Love (TVK)
- JOKER Yurusarezaru Sosakan (Fuji TV)
- Detective Conan Live Action Series(Wataru Takagi)
