= Plus (band) =

Japanese boy band

- Origin: Tokyo, Japan
- Genres: J-pop
- Years active: 2009–present
- Label: Pony Canyon (2009–2011)
- Members: Moto; Tomoya Nagai
- Past members: Yoshikazu Kotani; Takeshi Iwamoto
- Website: plus-info.jp

Plus (stylised as +Plus) is a Japanese pop boy band formed in December 2009 that has been signed to the label, Pony Canyon. The band combines in its pop tunes elements of genres such as hip hop, reggae, and R&B.

They released their debut album Canvas in 2010. They are well known for singing the opening and ending themes for popular anime such as Fairy Tail and Reborn!

== Members ==
=== Current ===
- Moto (もと) — vocals and guitar
- Tomoya Nagai (永井 朋弥) — vocals

=== Former ===
- Yoshikazu Kotani (小谷 嘉一) — vocals and bass
- Takeshi Iwamoto (岩元 健) — vocals

== Discography ==
=== Studio albums ===
Title	Year	Album details	Peak chart positions	Sales
Title	Year	Album details	JPN	Sales
Canvas (キャンバス)	2010	Released: April 21, 2010; Label: Pony Canyon; Formats: CD	188	—
Hajimari no Sora (はじまりの空) (lit. The Sky of Beginnings)	2012	Released: May 23, 2012; Label: Pony Canyon; Formats: CD	67	—
"—" denotes releases that did not chart or were not released in that region.

=== Singles ===
Title	Year	Peak chart positions	Sales	Album
Title	Year	JPN	Sales	Album
"Answer"	2009	—	—	Non-album single
"Hinata ni Saku Yume" (日向に咲く夢) (lit. "Dreams That Blossom in the Sun")	2009	91	—	Canvas
"Yukimichi" (雪道) (lit. "Snowy Road")	2009	137	—	Canvas
"Koe" (声) (lit. "Voice")	2010	97	—	Canvas
"Canvas" (キャンバス)	2010	91	—	Canvas
"Fiesta" / "Yell" (エール)	2011	64	—	Hajimari no Sora
"Brand New Days"	2013	141	—	Non-album single
"—" denotes releases that did not chart or were not released in that region.
