= List of The Prince of Tennis characters =

The Prince of Tennis manga and anime series has a large cast of fictional characters created by Takeshi Konomi; many have appeared in the musical and film adaptations. The cast of the series is largely made up of the members of the various tennis teams for the schools portrayed in the series, their coaches, and various family members and supporters.

The main character of the series is Ryoma Echizen, a 12-year-old tennis prodigy who joins the Seishun Academy tennis team. The main cast is rounded out with the other eight regular players for Seishun, all of whom have various special abilities at playing tennis. Beyond them, there are many rival schools whose players reappear during the course of the series.

== Protagonists ==
The protagonists of the series all attend Seishun Academy (青春学園, Seishun Gakuen), or Seigaku (青学) for short. The school is famous for its talented tennis club in which the series' leading protagonist, Ryoma Echizen, is enrolled in the school by his father, Nanjiro Echizen, a former professional tennis player and Seigaku alumni. Although Seigaku has long been known for its tennis club, the void created by Nanjiro's departure years earlier throws the team into somewhat of a slump, leaving them unable to make it to Nationals over the next several years until a first year, Tezuka, joins the team. The story picks up two years later, with Tezuka now in his third year. The team slowly reforms, and Seigaku pulls off its first National victory with Ryoma's addition to the team.

=== Ryoma Echizen ===
Ryoma is the series protagonist and the only first year on the Seigaku tennis team. His play style is all rounder, and his signature serve is the "Twist serve", a variation on the standard topspin serve where the ball is hit with a combination of both topspin and sidespin, allowing the ball to bounce high and curve toward the receivers' face. His arsenal of skills also include the Drive A, B, C, and D, the Cool Drive, the Samurai Drive, and Cyclone Smash. His strengths include his ability to analyze his opponents' abilities during the match and adapt his own play accordingly to take advantage of their weaknesses. He is left-handed, but he often starts matches playing right-handed. Though often playing Singles 2 or 3, he begins to take Singles 1 by the end of the Kantou tournament, with the fate of the team's overall success riding on his game; the pressure often seems to be helpful towards his performance, bringing out the best in him — depending on the skill level of the opponent. His bored and cocky demeanor masks his underlying affection and respect for his teammates, especially his close friend Momoshiro and team captain Tezuka. By the time of The Prince of Tennis II, all of middle schoolers are shown to have developed great respect for Ryoma to the point where even some of the best high schoolers at the U-17 camp find him impressive. However, Ryoma ultimately ends up getting kicked out of the U-17 camp after interfering with a match to protect a friend. This expulsion is rescinded, however, but not before Ryoma joins the All-American representative team instead.

In The Prince of Tennis live-action film, Ryoma was portrayed by Kanata Hongo. In the musicals, Echizen has been portrayed by actors Kotaro Yanagi (2003–2006), Yuya Endo (2004–2005), Dori Sakurada (2006–2007), Shogo Sakamoto (2007–2009), Ryuki Takahashi (2008–2010), Yuki Ogoe (2010–2014), Kazuki Furuta (2015–2016), Nichika Akutsu (2016–2020) and currently Hikaru Imamaki (2020-).

=== Kunimitsu Tezuka ===
Tezuka is the national-level captain of the Seigaku tennis team. Like Ryoma, he is an all-rounder, and his special shots include the "Tezuka Zone," which uses his exceptional racket control to put spin on the ball to allow all shots to return to Tezuka no matter where the opponent tries to hit, and the "Zero-Shiki (Degree) Drop Shot", which is a drop shot with heavy backspin that can make the ball roll towards the net rather than bounce towards the opposing player. He was later able to adapt his drop Shot into a serve.

Tezuka is noted for being rather distant during practices and never smiling. However, he truly cares about his team and always tries to help them improve. At the nationals match against Sanada of Rikkaidai, Tezuka uses another special technique opposite to "Tezuka Zone" called "Tezuka Phantom" which forces the ball out of the cour, but the side effect injures his left arm.

At the end of The Prince of Tennis II Chapter 37, Tezuka is noted to have unlocked the last door of Muga No Kyouchi and has stepped off the training camp to become a Pro in Germany, where he receives tutelage under the 17-year old pro player Volk, and subsequently joins the All-German Representatives. During exhibition match against Japan, he teamed up with Q.P and decimated Atobe Keigo and Kirei Kanata pair in a 6-0 match.

In The Prince of Tennis live-action film, Tezuka was portrayed by Yu Shirota. In Musical: The Prince of Tennis, Tezuka has been portrayed by actors Eiji Takigawa (2003–2005), Kengo Ohkuchi, who stood as Tezuka in the place of Eiji Takigawa in the More Than Limit St. Rudolph Gakuen musical, Yu Shirota (2005–2006), Keisuke Minami (2006–2007), Daisuke Watanabe (2007–2009), Baba Ryoma (2008–2010), Takuma Wada (2010–2012), Hideya Tawada (2012–2014), Takuma Zaiki (2015–2016), Yuya Uno (2016–2018), Ryo Aoki (2018–2020), and Kento Yamada (2020-). Tezuka is the captain of the Seigaku tennis team and its number one player, and has an unbeaten tennis record. The word "stoic" doesn't even begin to describe him. He doesn't smile, doesn't laugh, and has a very no-nonsense type of personality.

Later on, it turns out that Tezuka is indeed a very passionate person that will never surrender in the pursuit of his ideals. The success of his tennis team, his determination and stubbornness are nearly unmatched and he will lead through no matter what, even if it means his death or ability to play on.

Tezuka is aloof from his teammates but highly regarded. He is a good student (he has been known to correct the teachers and terrify them while doing so simply through his presence), president of the student council, and is popular.

His catch phrase, "let's not be careless!" was painfully learned in his first year. As a new player, he was stronger than his seniors, and tried not to embarrass them by playing with his right hand (he is left-handed). However, this was discovered and an enraged senpai struck him in the left arm. This injury comes back to haunt him, and eventually causes him to leave for Germany for treatment.

Tezuka's goal is to become the "pillar of Seigaku." He was challenged by the captain in his first year to become the "pillar" the team could rely on. This is how he eventually ruins his arm - he plays past the point of reason to exist as an example to his teammates.

=== Shuichiro Oishi ===
Voiced by: Takayuki Kondo (Japanese); Sam Riegel (Viz Media dub), Jacob Hopkins (Funimation dub) (English)

Shuichiro Oishi (大石 秀一郎, Ōishi Shūichirō) is the vice-captain of the club. Oishi and Kikumaru Eiji make up Seigaku's national level doubles team, known as the "Golden Pair". Oishi is known as the 'Mother Hen of Seigaku', because he constantly worries and frets for the team's well-being. He remains calm and rational in a match, allowing him to form strategies quickly. He uses the Moon Volley, a topspin lob that travels very high over the court and lands just in bounds. He can also use the "Drop Volley", a feint hit with the power of a drop shot, making the trajectory much closer to the net. He is portrayed by Hiroki Suzuki in the live-action film.

He and Eiji often use the "Australian Formation", where they stand directly on the center line to confuse the opponents as to which way each player will move when the ball is placed into the opposing court. The "I-Formation" is a variation where Eiji stays below the net and Oishi serves the ball down the center. They also develop "Oishi Territory", which has Oishi focus on the net while Eiji stays in the back. It takes advantage of Oishi's ability to read the opponent while passing information to Eiji in the back. They later develop the "Synchronization" ability, which lets them play and move as if they are one person.

Despite his worrywart nature, Oishi is actually an extremely strict and disciplined leader, and a brilliant tactician on the court. His competitive nature is a stark contrast to his more timid public personality. He seems to easily become embarrassed as Kaido, but is also seen practicing proper etiquette more so than anyone else in the series because of his consideration for others.

Oishi plays the mother in the tenipuri episodes. Inui is her husband; Ryoma Echizen, Kaoru Kaido, and Takeshi Momoshiro (Momoko) are her children.

In The Prince of Tennis II, Oishi earns the No. 16 badge for the U-17 first string. He is also one of the 14 middle schoolers to represent Japan at the U-17 world cup. Despite the fact that he's not the captain of the middle school representatives, Oishi represents the Japanese U-17 team as a whole on the world stage, drawing lottery slots to determine the team's initial positions for the tournament.

In Musical: The Prince of Tennis, Oishi has been portrayed by Yuichi Tsuchiya (2003–2005), Hiroki Suzuki (2005–2006), Yukihiro Takiguchi (2006–2007), Yuya Toyoda (2007–2009), Yuki Tsujimoto (2008–2010), Jin Hiramaki (2010–2012), Ikkei Yamamoto (2012–2014), Shun Ishida (2015–2016), Yu Matsumura (2016–2018), Takanori Ezoe (2018–2020), and Takakazu Hara (2021-).

=== Shusuke Fuji ===
Voiced by: Yuki Kaida (Japanese) (Japanese); Adam Lawson (Viz Media dub, episodes 1–30) and Johnny Yong Bosch (Viz Media dub, episodes 31–50), Stephen Fu (Funimation dub) (English)

Shusuke Fuji (不二 周助, Fuji Shūsuke) is a third year student at Seishun Academy. The middle child of three, he has an older sister, Yumiko, who is very attractive and admired by his friends; his younger brother is Yuta, who was a student at Seigaku, but transferred to St. Rudolph. Fuji is a leap year baby, only getting to properly celebrate his birthday properly every 4 years. He is given the title "tensai", or genius, due to his tactical skill on the tennis court. Fuji's most famous moves are known as the Triple Counters: Higuma Ootoshi ("Bear Drop") for returning smashes; Tsubame Gaeshi ("Swallow Return") which runs on the ground without bouncing, effective against players at the baseline; and Hakugei ("White Whale"), a shot that uses the wind to hop straight into the air and return to Fuji on the bounce, effective against players at the net. During the nationals, he creates more effective versions of his Triple Counters; three more original counters to deal with complex spin shots, low spin shots, and net balls; and even masters how to play with his eyes closed. In addition, Fuji has an underhand serve that seems to disappear when the opponent is about to hit it. A running gag in the series is that Fuji has interest in or else near-immunity to strange foods and drinks that others would find revolting to the point of fainting. Should he ever pass out from consuming any of the strange concoctions Inui or other data tennis characters come up with, the item in question is deemed a true terror.

He is generally very relaxed and in control, often seen with a calm and content expression on his face with his eyes seemingly closed from lightly smiling, and rarely plays at full power. He only seems to do so when he witnesses some form of injustice or wins on the behalf of others who placed their personal health at risk playing tennis. For this reason, data-driven players like Inui and Mizuki cannot predict his movements at all. Fuji later admits to Tezuka that this is due to the fact that he has zero motivation to win, at least prior to the Nationals. There are a few people that can "wake" the true player in Fuji and force him to play seriously, and these few are either nationally ranked or extremely talented tennis players. Seigaku teammates Kunimitsu Tezuka and Ryoma Echizen, Shitenhōji captain Kuranosuke Shiraishi, Hyotei Gakuen Chuto Bu regular Yushi Oshitari and Rikkaidai Fuzoku regular Akaya Kirihara have been acknowledged by Fuji to be actual challenges. When he is excited, provoked, or serious, Fuji reveals his sharp eyes: light brown in the manga and blue in the anime.

In The Prince of Tennis II, Fuji laments over how he longer has Tezuka to help drive him to keep improving at tennis after the latter leaves for Germany. Fuji recreates his tennis to be more offensive (as opposed to his more defensive, passive approach of past matches) in order to be more competitive at the U-17 world cup, at which he is one of the 14 middle schoolers representing Japan. His first new counter, Hollyhock Blizzard, reflects this by replacing the Higuma Ootoshi (which is functionally a lob) altogether, as this new counter returns opponents' smashes with a smash of his own.

Fuji is one of the few male characters in the anime who is voiced by a female voice actor, others being Ryoma Echizen, Kintarou Tooyama of Shitenhouji, Taichi Dan of Yamabuki, Youhei and Kouhei Tanaka of Jyosei Shonan (the latter two being anime only characters), and Seiichi Yukimura of Rikkaidai Fuzoku. However, Ryoma, Kintarō and Taichi are first years, thus younger and more naturally voiced by a voice actress. Despite Fuji and Yukimura being third years, they are also voiced by voice actresses.

In the anime series, Fuji's voice actress is Yuki Kaida who also voices Fuji's sister, Yumiko. For the live-action adaptation film of The Prince of Tennis, Tenimyu actor Hiroki Aiba portrays Fuji.

In Musical: The Prince of Tennis, Fuji has been portrayed by actors Kimeru (2003–2005), Takashi Nagayama, who stood in during Remarkable 1st Match Fudomine due to a cast change, Hiroki Aiba (2005–2007, 2008), Yūta Furukawa (2007–2009), Taito Hashimoto (2008–2010), Ryo Mitsuya (2010–2012), Yusuke Yata (2012–2014), Yuki Kamisato (2015–2016), Fuma Sadamoto (2016–2018), Ibu Minaki (2018–2020), and Haruki Mochida (2021-).

=== Sadaharu Inui ===
Voiced by: Kenjirō Tsuda (Japanese); Erik Davies (Viz Media dub), Stephen Kelly (Funimation dub) (English)

Sadaharu Inui (乾 貞治, Inui Sadaharu) is a highly intelligent player, who uses Data Tennis. He constantly collects and analyzes data of other players in order to predict where they hit to next and how. While he collects data pertaining to tennis, he also collects personal pieces of data, such as favorite things, personal habits, and where they have been. This, combined with his almost robotic analytical nature the fact that his eyes are rarely seen (appearing only once at the end of Chapter 211), creating no shortage of awkwardness in social situations outside the court. His style originates from his close friend, Renji of Rikkai, who played doubles with Inui before moving. He is temporarily removed from the regulars after losing to Ryoma and Kaido, and he becomes the team manager. He uses his data to create exercise programs for the team and creates a series of disgusting "Inui Juice" health drinks that are able to knock a person out or send them running to the restrooms, which motivates the team to train harder as the drinks are used as punishments. The negative effects of the drinks are resisted by a few, namely Fuji. He is portrayed by Hirofumi Araki in The Prince of Tennis live-action film.

Inui's data tennis allows him to predict the probability of a shot taking place although other factors can disrupt the probability. Though he relies on data, he still trains excessively to keep up with his teammates, taking on a training load 2.25x more than Kaido's, which is already 3x ahead of the rest of the team. This allows him to reclaim his spot as a regular by beating Momoshiro. He pairs with Kaido in doubles to help Kaido train, and Kaido's massive amount of stamina is used to let him play alone while Inui gathers data. Though Inui is good at predicting his opponent's movements, he can still be defeated by those who either have never shown him all of their techniques or simply surpass him on the physical level. He also has one of the fastest serves in the series. His Sonic Serve can reach 192 km/h (120 mph), though it would later be replaced by the Waterfall Serve. Its arc and descent resembles that of a waterfall engulfing the opponent, and can reach 212 km/h (~132 mph).

In The Prince of Tennis II, he helps Renji take the No. 17 spot on the U-17 first string. He and Renji both later join the intel support team for the All-Japan Representatives.

In the musicals, Inui has been portrayed by Sota Aoyama (2003–2005), Hirofumi Araki (2005–2006), Masei Nakayama (2006–2007), Yuuta Takahashi (2007–2009), Yusuke Arai (2008–2010), Teruma (2010–2012), Seiya Inagaki (2012–2014), and Ryosei Tanaka (2015–2016), Sho Kato (2016–2018), Daisuke Takenouchi (2018–2020), and Ichigo Shiota (2021-).

=== Eiji Kikumaru ===
Voiced by: Hiroki Takahashi (Japanese); Steve Staley (Viz Media dub), Derick Snow (Funimation dub) (English)

Eiji Kikumaru (菊丸 英二, Kikumaru Eiji) is part of Seigaku's "Golden Pair" along with Oishi. Even so, he sometimes does doubles with Fuji and they are then called the "Dream Pair". Eiji uses "Acrobatic Play" which takes advantage of his flexible body. Eiji is also known to have the sharpest vision on the team with an exceptional talent for seeing moving objects. His main weakness is his lack of stamina which he finally overcomes through hard work and training later in the series. Though the Golden Pair seldom play without each other, certain circumstances, such as their temporary breakup when Oishi gives his spot to Ryoma, forces him to play in singles. Eiji is a friendly, sweet-tempered, and outgoing character and the youngest of a large family. He is portrayed by Osamu Adachi in the live-action film.

Eiji's flexible body allows him to reach balls with a touch of flair that few can replicate. His dives and flips often astonish the spectators and often gets grudging praise from his opponents helping Eiji focus. He focuses on the net with his "Kikumaru Beam", a sharp volley that is hit with his hand reaching around his back, and his "Kikumaru Bazooka", a smash hit upside-down. While playing doubles, Eiji follows the lead of Oishi. The two rely on and know each other thoroughly, which allows them to predict each other's moves without any signals. They further develop this by achieving "Synchronization", letting them act together as if they were only one person. He can also play well in singles by using his "Seal Step", which uses his speed to move from one location to a new one the moment the opponents eyes leave his first location. This gives the opponent the impression that there are two of him for a doppelganger type effect, though the anime gives him the ability to hug and high five his after image, making it slightly unrealistic.

Eiji's favorite color is red; he enjoys brushing his teeth, wandering around pet shops, omelette rice, fried shrimp, and shaved ice. He was born November 28 at 6:28 am and is a Sagittarius. He has grandparents, a mother, a father, two older sisters, and two older brothers, and therefore is the youngest of a very large family, something that gives him attributes of being fun-loving and easy-going. His father is a news reporter. His favorite subject is Japanese history. He has declared that he might want to become a stunt double in the future with Oishi being his personal trainer, doctor, and still best friend. His favorite date spot is the amusement park; he loves anime/fantasy, idol magazines, and JPOP. He also looks for someone who is cheerful and someone whom he can share a laugh with in a friend. He most wants a new knitted hat. Outside of tennis, he excels in fly swatting, bug collecting, cooking, and can often be found in the gymnasium when not at the tennis courts.

In the Tenipuri Family episodes, Eiji plays the family's pet, a pink cat named Kikumaru.

In the musicals, Eiji has been portrayed by Yamazaki Ichitaro (2003–2004), Takashi Nagayama (2003–2005), Adachi Osamu (2005–2006), Koji Seto (2006–2007), Kyousuke Hamao (2007–2009), Takasaki Shouta (2008–2010), Koseki Yuta (2010–2012), Mario Kuroba (2012–2014), and Honda Reo (2015–2016), Seiichiro Nagata (2016–2018), Tsukasa Taguchi (2018–2020), and Sosho Tomimoto (2021-).

=== Takeshi Momoshiro ===
Voiced by: Masaya Onosaka (Japanese); Doug Erholtz (Viz Media dub), Alejandro Saab (Funimation dub) (English)

Takeshi Momoshiro (桃城 武, Momoshiro Takeshi) is known as Seigaku's "number one rascal." As the player who is the most open and friendly with everyone, Momoshiro is connected to everyone on the team on some level. Momoshiro is the closest to a true friend Ryoma Echizen can claim; the two spend much time together eating hamburgers or playing street tennis. Momoshiro and Kaido Kaoru are eternal rivals, and constantly try to out-do each other. This makes them efficient as a doubles pair, because the two rivals know each other so well. Momoshiro develops an affinity for playing doubles and even masters it, despite expressing a preference for singles. He loses his position as a regular after losing to Inui in the ranking matches. When Oishi injures his wrist before the match against Hyotei, Momoshiro takes his place to form a makeshift Golden Pair with Kikumaru. After that, he keeps his regular spot when Tezuka leaves for rehabilitation. He becomes the Vice-captain of Seigaku the following year. He is portrayed by Masaki Kaji in The Prince of Tennis live-action film.

Momoshiro's signature move is the Dunk Smash, a very powerful smash performed as he jumps several feet into the air. His catchphrase is "Don", which he often says upon hitting a winner. He later develops the Jack Knife, a pro-level powerful backhand. In the anime, he develops the Super Dunk, a Dunk Smash that spins for a long time on the court before bouncing, thus confusing the opponent as to when it will bounce up. Momoshiro is good at "faking out" his opponents and is just as excellent of a tactician as Oishi on the court. His ability to read the opponent's movements and to observe their viewpoints and expression allows Momoshiro to guess where the ball will go and use techniques that will confuse his opponents. He later improves upon this ability by training in the mountains, allowing him to be more in tune with nature to the point where he can even read and predict weather patterns.

In The Prince of Tennis II, his wrists suffer severe damage after being on the receiving end of a Black Jack Knife, which has twice the spin and power of his regular Jack Knife. However, he later learns the Black Jack Knife himself, and uses it to take the No. 19 position on the U-17 first string.

In the musicals, Momoshiro has been portrayed by Eiji Moriyama (2003–2005), Masaki Kaji (2005–2006), Shinpei Takagi (2006–2007), Tetsuya Makita (2007–2009), Toshihiro Nobuyama (2008–2010), Toru Kamitsuru (2010–2012), Mashu Ishiwatari (2012–2014), Shuto Mashima (2015–2016), Shunsaku Yoshimura (2016–2018), Tatsuki Ōkubo (2018–2020), and Shun Hojuyama (2020-).

=== Takashi Kawamura ===
Voiced by: Naru Kawamoto (Japanese); Richard Cansino (Viz Media dub), Anthony Sardinha (Funimation dub) (English)

Takashi Kawamura (河村 隆, Kawamura Takashi) has a shy personality without his tennis racket, but he becomes extremely aggressive and loud once he holds a tennis racket, referred to as Burning Mode. He often shouts various English words like "Burning!", "Great!", "Come on, baby!", "Shocking!", "Victory!", and "Delicious!" while in Burning Mode. During his first year, he had a lot of power, but lacked control to the point where most of his shots were outside the court fences. He was made fun of by his peers, but his close friends stayed by him and helped him develop his control. During his third year, he became a regular and eventually meets his goal of becoming the number one power player in Japan by beating Gin Ishida. He plans to quit playing tennis after the tournament and focus on working as a sushi chef under his father with the goal of being number one in the future. He is portrayed by Yoshikazu Kotani in The Prince of Tennis live-action film.

Kawamura mainly relies on the Hadoukyuu (ハドウキュウ), a very powerful maneuver that uses 120% of an arm's strength, but puts a lot of strain on his arm. He copies it from Fudomine's Tetsu Ishida, who learned it from his brother, Gin. Kawamura lowers the risk of the shot by using a Two-Handed Hadoukyuu (両手ハドウキュウ), which decreases the power. He can use either while jumping to make the Jump Hadoukyuu (ジャンプ ハドウキュウ), which is hard to return. He later develops the Dash Hadoukyuu (ダッシュ ハドウキュウ), which is a regular Hadoukyuu performed during an extremely fast dash. It strengthens the shot by focusing all the momentum on the wrist, but it can break the wrist if overused. During his match against Gin, he develops a "Final Hadoukyuu" that, because he accidentally hit with racket frame instead of the gut, the ball vibrates, and thus has power far exceeding Gin's strongest Hadoukyuu, breaking the latter's wrist.

He also reappears as a candidate in the U-17 selection camp, where he loses to Jin Akutsu, but comes back to take the No. 12 position in the first string.

In the musicals, Kawamura has been portrayed by Yoshitsugu Abe (2003–2005), Eiki Kitamura, who stood in for Abe in the More than St. Rudolph Gakuen Musical, Yoshikazu Kotani (2005–2006), Kouji Watanabe (2006–2007), Hiroaki Ogasawara (2007–2009, eventually replaced by Gong Teyu), Ikkou Chou (2008–2010), Sora Yaguchi (previously known as Tomohiro Tsurumi) (2010–2012), Shohei (2012–2014), Kodai Takikawa (2015–2016), Masaya Suzuki (2016–2018), Tomoki Iwata (2018–2020), and Kai Otomo (2021-).

=== Kaoru Kaido ===
Voiced by: Kōhei Kiyasu (Japanese); David Lodge (Viz Media dub), Jarrod Greene (Funimation dub) (English)

Kaoru Kaido (海堂 薫, Kaidō Kaoru) (sometimes spelled Kaidou) is known as "Viper" to his teammates for constantly making a "fshuuuu" sound similar to a snake while exhaling. Kaido trains rigorously, increasing the training program given to him by Inui to give him an abnormally high stamina, even against other characters who boast to have high stamina. He has a deep rivalry with Momoshiro, in which they constantly try to beat each other. Because they are rivals, they also know each other the best, and they can get along very well in times of need; this makes them an efficient doubles pair. He normally plays singles, though he eventually pairs with Inui, who helps Kaido train and develop new techniques. Kaido's stamina is used to let him play the other team alone, while Inui collects data. After the national tournament, Kaido becomes the new captain of Seigaku. He is portrayed by Kousuke Kujirai in the live-action The Prince of Tennis film.

His signature move is the Snake Shot, derived from the "Buggy Whip Shot", which is a curving forehand that keeps his opponents running. He later develops the Boomerang Snake, where the ball swerves around the net pole back in bounds. He develops the shot under Inui's advice and by working with him in doubles. He also develops the Short Snake, which goes directly behind the net player, the Reverse Snake, which is used to keep opponents guessing, and the Tornado Snake, which is a fast straight shot with a spin that cuts air resistance. He can also use Hiroshi Yagyu's "Laser Beam", calling his version the Gyro Laser, which is an extremely fast shot with the same spin as the Tornado Snake, allowing him to confuse opponents. He also develops the Hadoukyuu Boomerang in the anime, which is developed from the Hadoukyuu that has much more strength behind a regular Boomerang shot.

Although he has a tough exterior and is cold towards others, there is a softer side to Kaido. Unknown to many, Kaidou enjoys playing with small animals. He is often seen playing (or at least trying to play) with Ryoma's cat, Karupin, who wanders off on his own most of the time. Koharu notes that Kaido was often mistaken for a girl back in Kindergarten and was sometimes forced to wear a skirt, crying a lot as a result, implying that Kaido's tough demeanor is merely a front to hide his insecurities. This hidden vulnerability often puts Kaidou in many comedic situations as he tends to take himself way too seriously compared to his peers.

In the various TeniPuri Family episodes, Kaido is the young infant. Not being able to speak, he mainly just says "fssshhuuuu". Shuuko (Oishi) introduced infant – Kaido as "cutie-pie, Kaoru-chan". He is often bullied in some sorts by his older siblings, Ryoma and Momoko (Momoshiro).

In the musicals, Kaido has been portrayed by Naoya Gomoto (2003–2005), Kousuke Kujirai (2005–2006), Tomo Yanagishita (2006–2008), Yuuichirou Hirata (2007–2009), Akihiro Hayashi (2008–2010), Ryosuke Ikeoka (2010–2012), Tatsunari Kimura (2012–2014), Hiroki Sana (2015–2016), Hikaru Makishima (2016–2018), Takuto Nakajima (2018–2020), and Yuga Iwasaki (2021-).

=== Sumire Ryuzaki ===
Voiced by: Shizuka Okohira (Japanese); Barbara Goodson (Viz Media dub), Wendy Powell (Funimation dub) (English)

Sumire Ryuzaki (竜崎 スミレ, Ryūzaki Sumire) is the coach of Seigaku's tennis club and one of the school's math teachers. She helped Nanjiro Echizen develop his skills and become a professional tennis player. Her granddaughter Sakuno has a crush on Ryoma. Ryuzaki has a rivalry with her ex-mentor Mikiya Banda, a.k.a. Banji, who is the coach for Yamabuki. She constantly yells, but she is considered to be a great and reliable coach. She has a good relationship with her regulars and participates in their recreational group activities: the bowling reunion and the beach-volley mini-tournament with Rokkaku Middle School. For the Prince of Tennis live-action film, Ryuzaki's whole personality and back story was changed: she also had Ryoma's father in her tennis team a couple of years ago, and instead of being a middle-aged teacher and ex-coach to Nanjiro Echizen, she is portrayed as a young and more cheerful woman as well as a former classmate of Nanjiro's, who was her reason for playing tennis and becoming the coach. She is portrayed by the popular singer Hitomi Shimatani in the live-action film.

== Opponents ==
=== Fudomine ===
Fudomine Junior High (市立不動峰中学校, Fudōmine Chūgakkō) is an unseeded and unknown public school with rumors of violence. It was originally unknown due to an unreasonable coach and a lazy set of senior regulars. The freshmen at Fudoumine were brutalized severely by the older tennis club members, while the coach ignored the mistreatment. Tachibana and the abused freshman attempted to rally together and form their own tennis club, but the coach and the other players find this idea absurd and try to stop this from happening. When the coach allows his older team members to attack Tachibana and the freshman, Tachibana snaps and attacks the coach. As a result, Fudoumine is pulled out of the District Matches that year. Tachibana and the others eventually reform the club, and in the series, upsets Kakinoki in the District Tournament semi-finals and Hyotei in the Prefectural quarterfinals. They go on to make it all the way to the quarterfinals of the Nationals before losing to Shitenhouji. Fudomine's uniforms are black hooded jackets with the Fudomine logo, black shirts, white shorts, and black warm-up pants.

Kippei Tachibana (橘 桔平, Tachibana Kippei)
Voiced by: Yoshihisa Kawahara (Japanese); Doug Erholtz (Viz Media dub), Kaiji Tang (Funimation dub) (English)
Tachibana is the captain of Fudomine. He was originally from the Kyūshū region of Japan, where he attended Shishigaku Middle School. He and his close friend, Chitose, led their team to the semifinals of the Nationals as the top two players of the region. Tachibana is a very aggressive player, and during an intra-school ranking match, he injured Chitose after deciding to try out his new move, the Wild Ball, which makes it look like there are numerous balls coming at one time. He cuts and stops bleaching his hair, moves with his father and sister, and eventually starts with the Fudoumine club in order to play Chitose again. He uses the "Moujuu Aura" (Wild Beast Aura), which draws out his natural style and increases his physical abilities, especially when using his "Abare Dama" frame of racket shot, as well as the "Abare Jishi". In The Prince of Tennis II, he is one of the players invited to the Japanese U17 team. He is portrayed by Takuma Sugawara, YOH, Takashi Kitadai, Yusuke Ueda (2nd season), Soramu Aoki (3rd season), and GAKU (4th season) in the musicals.

Akira Kamio (神尾 アキラ, Kamio Akira)
Voiced by: Chihiro Suzuki (Japanese); David Neil Black (Viz Media dub), Zeno Robinson (Funimation dub) (English)
Akira is the vice-captain of Fudomine, who normally plays singles or doubles with his long-time friend Shinji Ibu. His style focuses on speed and "rhythm" of his feet; in other words, he's extremely fast. He uses the "Sonic Bullet" shot, which seems to disappear, and the "Quick-Drop Serve", which is hit before it rises to the top, throwing off the opponents timing and slightly increasing the speed. He has a crush on An, and is jealous when she goes out with Momoshiro. He later learns to use Tachibana's Wild Beast Aura to greatly increase his speed. In The Prince of Tennis II, he is one of the players invited to the Japanese U-17 team. He is portrayed by Matsui Yasuyuki, Yuki Fujiwara, Kinari Hirano (2nd Season), Ryujiro Izaki (3rd season), and Kosuke Maiguma (4th season) in the musicals, and Yuki Fujiwara reprises that role in the live-action film.

Shinji Ibu (伊武 深司, Ibu Shinji)
Voiced by: Eiji Moriyama (Japanese); Kirk Thornton (Viz Media dub), Adam Gibbs (Funimation dub) (English)
Shinji normally plays singles or doubles with his best friend Akira Kamio. He often mumbles and rambles without realizing other people can hear him, making him a moody person in general. He utilizes the "Kick Serve", which bounces upward to the right, similarly to the twist serve. However, his main ability is to sense muscle tension in others, allowing him to utilize a passive-offensive style of tennis (alternating between topspin and backspin shots) that forces his opponent's arm muscles to freeze briefly, forcing them to miss the point. In The Prince of Tennis II, he is one of the players invited to the Japanese U-17 team. He is portrayed by Ryōsei Konishi, Motohiro Ota, Kazuhiro Okazaki (2nd season), Kento (3rd season), and Naotake Tsuchiya (4th season) in the musicals, and Yasuka Saitoh in the live-action film.

Tetsu Ishida (石田 鉄, Ishida Tetsu)
Voiced by: Takeshi Maeda (Japanese); Devon Bowman (English)
Tetsu Ishida normally plays doubles with Masaya Sakurai (桜井 雅也, Sakurai Masaya), who has a special power shot known as the Hadokyuu, an extremely powerful flat groundstroke that uses 120% of the user's strength. He learned it from his elder brother Gin, who for some strange reason attends the much further away Shitenhoji Middle School. It puts an extreme strain on his arm at first, which cause Tachibana to disallow him from using it until he masters it. He later learns to use Tachibana's Wild Beast Aura, where he not only becomes more powerful, but also acquires the ability to perform a Hadokyuu off of a backhand without stepping forward. Tetsu Ishida is portrayed by Mamoru Miyano, Kyoushirou Takagi (2nd season), Taro Nakamura (3rd season), and Totaro (4th season) in the musicals, and Masaya Sakurai is portrayed by Shun Takagi, Fumiya Takahashi (2nd season), Ryotaro (3rd season), and Yuto Fukazawa (4th season) in the musicals.

Kyosuke Uchimura (内村 京介, Uchimura Kyōsuke)
Voiced by: Kōhei Kiyasu (Japanese); Steve Staley (English)
Kyosuke Uchimura, nicknamed "The Forward Net Killer" plays doubles with Tatsunori Mori (森 辰徳, Mori Tatsunori). Kyousuke Uchimura is portrayed by Mao Katou (2nd season), Masaki Takane (3rd season), and Hayato Kikuchi (4th season) in the musicals, and Tatsunori Mori is portrayed by Youichiro Omi (2nd season), Tatsuya Kobayashi (3rd season), and Rayshy (4th season) in the musicals.

An Tachibana (橘杏, Tachibana An)
Voiced by: Akiko Kimura (Japanese); Stephanie Sheh (English)
She is the cute younger sister of Kippei. She is a member of the girls tennis club, and often supports her brother's team. An cares very much for her brother and her friends from both the Seigaku and Fudomine teams and tries to help them as much as possible. She is often seen with either Momoshiro or Kamio.

=== St. Rudolph ===
St. Rudolph Academy (私立聖ルドルフ学院中学校, Shiritsu Sei RUDORUFU Gakuin Chūgakkō) is a team that first appears in the Tokyo Metropolitan Matches arc and faces Seigaku in the quarterfinals. The school itself only recruits students who are gifted at tennis and they only practice together once a week. The team uniform is a white shirt with brown, brown shorts, and brown warm-up pants.

Yoshiro Akazawa (赤沢 吉郎, Akazawa Yoshirō)
Voiced by: Masami Iwasaki (Japanese); Tom Fahn (English)
Akazawa is the captain of the team and the doubles partner of Ichiro Kaneda, a soft-spoken player called a "prodigal doubles player." He is initially a singles player until being paired with Kaneda by Mizuki, which leaves him unable to properly play until Kaneda, who normally looks up to Akazawa, yells at him. The pair of Akazawa and Kaneda provide St. Rudolph's only victories in their losses to Seigaku and Hyoutei. Akazawa also defeated a Seigaku regular in the year prior to the manga's storyline. He is able to hit a shot that causes rapid movement of the ball, causing it to appear as a mass of balls to people with exceptional eyesight. He is portrayed by Kenji Aoki, Kenta Izuka (2nd season), Kenya Nakao (3rd season), and Hitoshi Okumura (4th season) in the musicals.

Takuya Nomura (野村 拓也, Nomura Takuya)
Voiced by: Takayuki Kondo (Japanese); Sam Riegel (English)
Nomura is the vice-captain, and the weakest member of the team according to Mizuki, though he often claims that he is the strongest. He is portrayed by Daiki Sagawa (3rd season), and Shuto Yaezawa (4th season) in the musicals.

Hajime Mizuki (観月 はじめ, Mizuki Hajime)
Voiced by: Akira Ishida (Japanese); Steve Staley (English)
Mizuki is the manager of the team who transfers from another school. He scouts talented players from around the country to join the tennis team in hopes of creating an elite team. He also uses data tennis like Inui, but unlike Inui's predictions, Mizuki's data tennis focuses on finding the opponent's weakness and targets them. This allows him to also create match up orders that are favorable to his team. Mizuki is also shown to be very ruthless, teaching Yuta Fuji the Twist Spin Shot, despite the fact that it could cause severe damage to Yuta's underdeveloped arm, and didn't inform him. His arrogance also comes back to bite him when he believes that he has collected all the data on Shusuke Fuji, only to be humiliated by him. In The Prince of Tennis II, he is one of the 50 middle schoolers to be invited to the U-17 camp, though he is rarely seen outside of occasional commentary on other players. He is portrayed by Hidemasa Shiozawa, Yutaka Kobayashi (2nd season), Kodai Miyagi (3rd season), and Junpei Mitsui (4th season) in the musicals.

Yuta Fuji (不二 裕太, Fuji Yūta)
Voiced by: Makoto Tomita (Japanese); Tom Gibis (Viz Media dub), Griffin Puatu (Funimation dub) (English)
Yuta is the younger brother of Shusuke Fuji who constantly overshadows him. Originally a student at Seigaku, he declines to join the tennis team and is eventually scouted by Mizuki. He hits at difficult angles for left-handed players, causing him to be known as the "Lefty-Killer." He uses the Rising Shot, which hits the ball on the rise, giving the opponents less time to react. Mizuki teaches him the Twist Spin Shot, which puts a topspin on the ball, causing it to bounce upwards, though it puts a heavy strain on undeveloped shoulders. Yuta is later made aware of this fact, but continues to use the move every now and then. In The Prince of Tennis II, he is one of the 50 middle schoolers to be invited to the U-17 camp. He is portrayed by KENN, Seiya Konishi (2nd season), Kaiki Ōhara (3rd season), and Yueto Ishihara (4th season) in the musicals.

Ichiro Kaneda (金田 一郎, Kaneda Ichirō)
Voiced by: Yoshihisa Kawahara (Japanese); Joshua Seth (English)
Kaneda is a relatively quiet doubles player for St. Rudolph. Aside from Akazawa, Kaneda is the only other member of the team who was initially from St. Rudolph, prior to Mizuki's arrival and subsequent recruiting of other skilled players. Although he has a great deal of respect for his Captain, he lashes out at him during their match against Oishi and Kikumaru. Although Akazawa initially attacks him and tells him to shut up, he then calms his head and begins listening to Kaneda, who guides the pair to victory. He is portrayed by Yuki Ohtake, Shotaro Ookubo (2nd season), Kaisei Kamimura (3rd season), and Raimu Ninomiya (4th season) in the musicals.

Shinya Yanagisawa (柳沢 慎也, Yanagisawa Shin'ya)
Voiced by: Norihisa Mori (Japanese); Darrel Guilbeau (Viz Media dub), Alex Mai (Funimation dub) (English)
Shinya is a doubles player, who frequently partners with Atsushi. He is very comical in his personality and style, as he almost always ends his sentences with "dane" in the Japanese dub, whereas in English other characters refer to him as a duck, possibly because of the way his mouth protrudes. He is portrayed by Mitsuyoshi Shinoda, Sho Jinnai (2nd season), Riku Ozeki (3rd season), Yudai Kubo (4th season) in the musicals.

Atsushi Kisarazu (木更津 淳, Kisarazu Atsushi)
Voiced by: Satoshi Tsuruoka (Japanese); Peter Doyle (English)
Atsushi is the twin brother of Rokkaku Jr. High's Ryou. Mizuki mistakenly scouts Atsushi instead of his brother, so he forces Atsushi to distinguish himself by cutting his hair and wearing a headband. Atsushi's signature shot is a fake smash, which he then turns into a volley, catching his opponents off guard. He is portrayed by Ryosuke Kato, Daisuke Hirose (2nd season), Yugo Sato (3rd season), Rei Sato (4th season) in the musicals.

=== Yamabuki ===
Yamabuki Middle School (私立山吹中学校, Shiritsu Yamabuki Chūgakkō) is a national caliber team that bases their strategy on two National caliber doubles teams, supported by the National caliber Singles player Sengoku. They try to use those three weapons to defeat opponents before the matches get drawn out. When their strategy was foiled in the previous year by Seigaku's Tezuka defeating Sengoku, they recruited a second dominant singles player Jin Akutsu, with the aim to eliminate that weakness. Yamabuki's regular sports uniforms are green jackets with yellow stripes with hoods, shirts of the same design, white shorts, and green warm-up pants.

Kentaro Minami (南 健太郎, Minami Kentarō)
Voiced by: Masaki Ishikawa (Japanese); Johnny Yong Bosch (English)
Kentarou is the captain of the team. He is a doubles player who typically plays with the vice captain of the team, Higashikata Masami. They are strong in the basics and use a strategy to pressure opponents. Together, he and Higashikata are known as the Jimmies, referring to jimi (地味), the Japanese word for plain or dull. He is portrayed by Hiroshi Yazaki, Jouji Saotome (2nd season), Naoya Kitagawa (3rd season), and Sho Kuwahara (4th season) in the musicals.

Masami Higashikata (東方 雅美, Higashikata Masami)
Voiced by: Yoshikazu Nagano
Masami is a 3rd year student and the vice-captain of the team. He is the doubles partner of Captain Kentaro Minami. He is portrayed by Iori Hayashi, Takeshi Terayama (2nd season), Yoshiro Tsuji (3rd season), and Soushi Haitsuka (4th season) in the musicals.

Kiyosumi Sengoku (千石 清純, Sengoku Kiyosumi)
Voiced by: Kōsuke Toriumi (Japanese); Clifford Chapin (English)
Sengoku, known as Lucky Sengoku, is a third year student, and is one of the keys to Yamabuki's strategy of finishing opposing teams off quickly. He is a happy-go-lucky guy with a strong tennis sense and extremely sharp eyes able to discern fast moving balls. His stronger weapons are the jumping serve, known as "Kohou (Tiger Cannon)" and the "Dunk Smash". He is known as a National level player, and was invited to the Junior Senbatsu (Junior Selection) training camp in his second year after Tezuka declined. Despite those honors, he suffered losses to both Momoshiro in the Prefectural tournament and Kamio in the Kanto tournament. In the anime, he leaves the Yamabuki team for a short while after those losses. He throws away his old style of tennis, trains in boxing, and forms "Boxing Tennis", which focuses on the three-minute limit in a boxing round. When he comes back to go to the camp to be chosen for the Goodwill Games between Japan and America, his new style, "Boxing Tennis", becomes a turning point in his style of play. He is portrayed by Masato Wada, Seiya (2nd season), Touya Morita (3rd season), and TAISEI (4th season) in the musicals.

Jin Akutsu (亜久津 仁, Akutsu Jin)
Voiced by: Nozomu Sasaki (Japanese); Patrick Seitz (English)
Jin is a punk, who is called a once-per-decade tennis player and known as a monster. A very cynical person, he hates to be bossed around and physically punishes those who order him to do something. He is very violent, attempts to cause conflict constantly, and also smokes in the manga. His unusual flexibility allows him to hit balls in all sorts of unnatural positions. Combined with his naturally high speed, this allows him to play offensively almost non-stop. He was trained in tennis at young age, but gave up after finding it boring due to a lack of competition. Mikiya Banda was able to recruit him under the promise of being able to hurt others (legally) and that he may leave once he loses. Akutsu is raised alone by his mother, Yuuki (who is only 33 at the time of introduction, meaning that had him when she was 19), who is heavily implied to have a lot of trouble disciplining Akutsu. Akutsu has also been a friend of Takashi Kawamura since taking karate together. After hurting Ryoma and his friends at Seigaku for Ryoma spoiling his "fun" at Ginka, he suffers his first ever loss in a match against Ryoma in the Prefectural tournament. He gives up tennis, having finally lost, encourages his fan, Dan, to look up to Ryoma instead, and generally becoming more content with people. He returns during the National Semifinals, catching Kawamura when he is sent flying into the stadium, and gives him encouragement to not forfeit. Akutsu is also among the former rivals of Ryoma who play matches with him after he loses his memory to help him regain his memories of tennis. In the anime, he also helps Ryoma regain confidence after a loss to Sanada. He reappears as a candidate for the Japanese U-17 team where, despite his absence from tennis following the Prefecturals, had become even stronger. It is revealed that he was subtly convinced to play tennis again by Sengoku after the former was having a lot of internal conflict about a genuine desire to play tennis again. By this time, he learns to legitimately enjoy tennis and loses most of his violent tendencies, and becomes one of the 14 middle schoolers chosen for the All-Japan U-17 team, though he keeps insisting he's only playing tennis again so as to finally beat Ryoma. He is portrayed by JURI, Ryoutarou Shimizu, Takuya Kishimoto (2nd season), Shota Kawakami (3rd season), and Takumi Masunaga (4th season) in the musicals.

Ichiuma Kita and Inakichi Nitobe (喜多 一馬 & 新渡米 稲吉, Ichiuma Kita and Inakichi Nitobe)
Voiced by: Ryōtarō Okiayu (Ichiuma), Kei Watanabe (Inakichi)
Kita, a 2nd year, and Nitobe, a third year, are two cynical doubles partners known for making silly puns. They are portrayed by Jin Aoki (3rd season, Ichiuma) and Yuma Tonishiro (3rd season, Inakichi), Futo Uchino (4th season, Ichiuma) and Rin Matsubara (4th season, Inakichi).

Toji Muromachi (室町 十次, Muromachi Tōji)
Voiced by: Takayuki Hirano (Japanese); Patrick Seitz (Viz Media dub), Daniel J. Edwards (Funimation dub) (English)
Toji is a 2nd year student, referred to as Yamabuki's eternal secret weapon. He always wears sunglasses to the point where he has a tan line under them, and thinks highly of Sengoku. He is portrayed by Takahiko Yanagisawa, Kenshō Ono (2nd season), Yuji Nishina (3rd season), and Leon Terashima (4th season) in the musicals.

Tsubasa Nishikiori (錦織 翼, Nishikiori Tsubasa)
Tsubasa is the replacement for Akutsu after he quits tennis.

Taichi Dan (壇 太一, Dan Taichi)
Voiced by: Yumiko Kobayashi (Japanese); Wendee Lee (English)
Taichi is a 1st year student and the manager of the team. He believes he is worthless because of his size and looks up to Akutsu because of his strength. Akutsu tells him to become stronger, which leads to him joining the team as a player. He is also inspired by seeing Ryoma play, realizing that even someone who is short can excel in tennis. He wears a headband that was given to him by Akutsu. After Yamabuki loses in the Nationals, Sengoku tells him that it will be up to him in the following season. In the anime, he copies Ryoma's style and techniques, such as "Twist Serve" and "Drive B", and challenges him to a match, which he loses badly. In the Japanese dub, he ends almost all of his sentences with "desu". He is portrayed by Yuki Kawakubo, Reiya Masaki (2nd season), Mashiro Sano (3rd season), and Yuki Hashimoto (4th season) in the musicals.

Mikiya Banda (伴田幹也, Banda Mikaya)
Voiced by: Kazuhiko Nishimatsu (Japanese); Christopher Corey Smith (English)
Mikiya Banda or "Banji" for short, is Yamabuki's coach. He is an eccentric old man who understands his players well, understanding that the key to getting Akutsu to take tennis seriously was just a matter of finding a suitable challenge, and is good friends with Coach Ryuzaki.

=== Hyoutei Academy ===
Hyoutei Academy Secondary Department (氷帝学園中等部, Hyoutei Gakuen Chūtō Bu) is a team that uses a strict stratification and merit system, which prioritizes ability over emotion. If any regular loses a match, they are removed from their spot and only given a second chance in very rare conditions. With Keigo Atobe as their leader, the one who revolutionized the merit system on the team. Hyoutei's tennis club is composed of over two hundred members, far larger than any other tennis club in the series, which is likely the reason why they use a strict merit system for their regulars in the first place. Widely considered as the main contenders to Rikkai Dai, they instead suffered setbacks in the early tournaments, losing to Fudomine in the quarterfinals of the Prefectural Tournament, and then losing to Seigaku in the first round of the Kanto tournament, leaving them ineligible for the National tournament. They are all depressed until they receive a special invite due to the host city, Tokyo, getting to invite one extra team. According to Takeshi Konomi, Hyoutei's popularity was much higher than he expected, and it was for that reason that he chose to bring them back into the story. The Hyoutei team is one of the most popular teams in the entire series. In the official school popularity poll, they came in second losing only to Seigaku.

Keigo Atobe (跡部 景吾, Atobe Keigo)
Voiced by: Junichi Suwabe (Japanese); Yuri Lowenthal (Viz Media dub), Christopher Wehkamp (Funimation dub) (English)
Atobe is the captain of Hyoutei. As a former European junior champion, he was relatively unknown in Japan until he defeated all of the members of the team in his first year and the Seigaku captain in his second year. He is severely narcissistic and arrogant, often using the quote "Be awed at the sight of my prowess!" (俺様の美技に酔いな, Ore-sama no bigi ni yoi na). He comes from a very wealthy family, and owns multiple chateaus, mansions, and vehicles, which are often used to benefit the team. Despite his personality, he trains constantly and takes pride in the team. He has rivalries with Tezuka, Sanada, and Ryoma. Atobe, using his superior eyesight, is able to use "insight" to quickly determine another player's weakness, which he uses to his own advantage. He eventually develops it to the point where he is able to anticipate the spin of the tennis ball by looking at the way his opponent hits it and apply the proper counterspin. He evolves it even further into his "World of Ice" (氷の世界, Kōri no Sekai), which allows him to find dead angles a player is unable to reach and hit balls with pinpoint accuracy and timing towards these areas. He also uses the Rondo Towards Destruction (破滅への輪舞曲, Hametsu e no rondo), a powerful smash that knocks the opponent's racket away and allow Atobe to smash it once again, and the Tannhauser Serve, which spins rapidly down the court instead of bouncing on impact. In The Prince of Tennis II, he evolves his insight skill to the point where he can see his opponent's skeleton to determine their absolute dead zones, a technique he calls Atobe Kingdom. He and Nio wins their doubles match against the U-17 first string to earn the No. 9/10 position. He is also later named Captain of the U-17's Jr. Youth (Middle School) division for the World Cup. Since his initial appearance, Atobe has become one of the most popular characters in The Prince of Tennis series. According to Takeshi Konomi, fans initially didn't like Atobe when he was trying to destroy Tezuka's arm, but by the conclusion of the match, he had become one of their favorite characters. In the 4th characters' popularity ranking, Atobe was voted first with a total of 12,913 votes, soundly beating Shusuke Fuji, who came in second with 6116 votes. Besides Ryoma Echizen, Atobe has released more character CDs than any other character in the series, and is the only other character to have two full-length albums. One of his singles reached top nine in the weekly charts, the best result for any Prince of Tennis character CDs. He is portrayed by Kazuki Kato, Yuki Kubota, Masahiro Inoue, (2nd season) Tsunenori Aoki, (2nd season) Shota Onuma, (3rd season) Miura Hiroki, and (4th season) Ryoya Takahashi in the musicals, and by Ryuji Sainei in The Prince of Tennis live-action film.

Munehiro Kabaji (樺地 崇弘, Kabaji Munehiro)
Voiced by: Satoshi Tsuruoka (Japanese); Brent Mukai (English)
Kabaji is a powerful hitter with a pure mind much like a baby. He rarely speaks and answers Atobe's questions only with "usu" ("yes" or "yup"). Due to his personality, he can instantly copy the moves of anyone he faces. He's generally very efficient at copying techniques, but his results are sometimes inferior if the said technique requires a biological factor or considerable experience. In The Prince of Tennis II, he earns the No. 13 position from the U-17 first string, but subsequently gets kicked out of the selection camp when he interfered with Atobe's match to protect him. Kabaji has appeared in every single character popularity poll for the series run by Shonen Jump. He came in 31st in the first poll, and 33rd in the second poll. He fell to 41st in the third poll, but he reached his highest ranking in the fourth poll, coming in 28th. He is portrayed by Ryo Washimi, Jouji Kawada, (2nd season) Hiroyuki Furuie, (3rd season) Yamaki Takanori, and (4th season) Itsuki Kurihara in the musicals, and by Kazutoshi Yamakawa in the live-action film.

Jiro Akutagawa (芥川 慈郎, Akutagawa Jirō)
Voiced by: Yuji Ueda (Japanese); Caleb Yen (English)
Jiro is called the "magic volleyer" of Hyoutei Academy. His play style, which focuses on returning balls directly from the net using his very flexible wrists, is inspired by Rikkai's Bunta Marui, who defeated him in a match two years earlier. Once he's at the net, he can hit volleys from any position and they can land almost anywhere with very little bounce, making them very difficult to return. He constantly sleeps, and he is very excitable. Takeshi Konomi originally intended Jirou to be a lazy genius character, but he went off course, ultimately becoming a more lighthearted character. Jirou has appeared in all of the Shonen Jump character popularity polls since his introduction into the story. In the second poll, he came in 25th place. In both the third and fourth polls, he came in 13th place. He is portrayed by Konma Takuya, Taiki Naitou, (2nd season) Tomoru Akazawa, (3rd season) Tamura Shogo, and (4th season) Kazan Yokoyama in the musicals, and by Genki Ishii in the live-action film.

Yushi Oshitari (忍足 侑士, Oshitari Yūshi)
Voiced by: Hidenobu Kiuchi (Japanese); Keith Silverstein (English)
Oshitari is the genius of Hyoutei Academy. Originally from Osaka, he is called "Oshitari of the one thousand skills" due to his ability to copy moves such as Shusuke Fuji's Bear Drop and Atobe's Tannhauser Serve. He also has several of his own unique shots, which he refers to by acronyms such as "FAS" and "SSAS". He is initially the doubles partner of Gakuto Mukahi, but moves up to Singles during the Nationals Tournament. During the two matches with Seigaku, Oshitari forms a rivalry with Momoshiro, and comes to respect his skill. He wears glasses without a prescription just to look smarter. Oshitari has been popular since his introduction in the series, and has done well on all of The Prince of Tennis character popularity polls run by Weekly Shonen Jump since then. In the second poll, he debuted in 9th place. He moved up to 5th place in the third poll, and came in 7th place in the fourth poll. He is portrayed by Takumi Saito, Shintarou Akiyama, (2nd season) Takuya Kikuchi, (3rd season) Isaka Ikumi, and (4th season) Ryono Kusachi in the musicals, and by Daiki Nakae in the live-action film.

Gakuto Mukahi (向日 岳人, Mukahi Gakuto)
Voiced by: Soichiro Hoshi (Japanese); Kevin Thelwell (English)
Gakuto is Yushi Oshitari's doubles partner. He has acrobatic skills rivaling and even surpassing those of Seigaku's Eiji, but has low stamina, which he overcomes through practice (not seen in the manga). He has a respectful friendship with Oshitari, which leads him to train his stamina in order to keep from holding Oshitari back. His special technique is the Moon Salute, which requires Gakuto to jump extremely high into the air, somersaulting, and returning the ball at a difficult angle. Gakuto came in 6th place in the fourth popularity poll. He is portrayed by Ruito Aoyagi, Seiji Fukuyama, (2nd season) Jun Shison, (3rd season) Kitano Satsuki, and (4th season) Iori Kotsuji in the musicals, and by Tokio Emoto in the live-action film.

Ryo Shishido (宍戸 亮, Shishido Ryō)
Voiced by: Toshiyuki Kusuda (Japanese); Billy Kametz (English)
Ryo is known as Hyoutei's "dash specialist" due to his speed and ability to return almost any ball. He is initially dropped from the regulars after being humiliated 6–0 by Kippei Tachibana, but he soon cuts his precious long hair and makes a return to the team. He join with Chotarou Ohtori in doubles, and they become very close. After hard training, he develops the Rising Counter, which hits the ball directly after it bounces, which is strengthened by his dashing. Shishido has appeared in all of the Shonen Jump character popularity polls since his introduction into the story. In the second poll, he came in 20th place. In both the third and fourth polls, he came in 12th place. He is portrayed by Kenta Kamakari, Ryouta Murai, (2nd season) Kousuke Kuwano, (3rd season) Kobayakawa Shunsuke, and (4th season) Yuto Hiroi in the musicals, and by Junpei Suzuki in the live-action film.

Chotaro Ohtori (鳳 長太郎, Ōtori Chōtarō)
Voiced by: Daisuke Namikawa (Japanese); Brandon McInnis (English)
Chotaro is Ryo Shishido's doubles partner and close friend. He helps Shishido get back on the team, which makes the two very close. Chotaro has a very fast serve called the Scud Serve, which can go up to 200 km/h, though it is limited in accuracy until he masters it. He later renames it the Neo Scud Serve, which goes up to 215 km/h. He recites "one shot with all my soul" (一球入魂, Ikyuunyuukon) while serving. Chotaro has appeared in all of the Shonen Jump popularity polls since his introduction. In the second poll, he came in 19th place. In the third he came in 20th place, and moved up to 16th place in the fourth poll. He is portrayed by Koji Date, Yuusuke Seto, Li Yong En, (2nd season) Jin Shirasu, (3rd season) Watanabe Aoto, and (4th season) Riku Akashi in the musicals, with Koji Date reprising the role in the live-action film.

Wakashi Hiyoshi (日吉 若, Hiyoshi Wakashi)
Voiced by: Masami Iwasaki (Japanese); David Matranga (English)
Hiyoshi uses an unorthodox style of tennis he dubs Embu Tennis, which combines martial arts with standard tennis, allowing him to hit fast shots that can easily land in corners. It was developed after the coach tells him to hit in his most natural form after noting that Hiyoshi's follow through was extremely slow in the conventional tennis stance. Hiyoshi's motto is "gekokujou"(下克上) meaning "to defeat the greater and take his place". In the English manga "gekokujou" is translated as 'overthrow'. Hiyoshi is expected to be the next Hyoutei captain after Atobe graduates. Like Mukahi, he has stamina issues, something he overcomes by The Prince of Tennis II. In the fourth popularity poll for the series conducted by Shonen Jump, Hiyoshi came in 10th place. He is portrayed by Ryunosuke Kawai, Kei Hosogai, (2nd season) Daiki Ise, (3rd season) Utsumi Akiyoshi, and (4th season) Futa Sakayori in the musicals.

=== Josei Shonan ===
Josei Shonan (城成湘南中学校, Jōsei Shōnan Chūgakkō) resides in the Kanagawa Prefecture of the Tokyo region. Though they are mentioned in the manga, they only appear in the anime, where they replace Midoriyama as Seigaku's opponents in the second round of the Kantō Tournament.

Aoi Hanamura (華村 葵, Hanamura Aoi)
Voiced by: Kaori Yamagata
Aoi Hanamura is the coach of the team, who refers to her students as masterpieces and constantly tries to recruit new students, especially Ryoma. She is often proud of her own prowess and of her pupils', but is otherwise very calm and professional.

Takahisa Kajimoto (梶本 貴久, Kajimoto Takahisa)
Voiced by: Katsuyuki Konishi
Takahisa is the serious and soft-spoken captain. His flexibility is used in his serve, the L-drive Serve, where he bends his entire body back and releases it like a catapult.

Hiroshi Wakato (若人弘, Wakato Hiroshi)
Voiced by: Masami Kikuchi
Hiroshi is the vice-captain, who can copy any famous professional tennis player's playing style using his Change Over technique, even copying their smallest habits. With this move, he can change his play style easily and when his opponent finally gets used to his style, he changes over again. Though he passes it off as just copying, he spends countless hours practicing. He is very popular, even having his own fanclub, which follows him to his official matches.

Reiji Shinjo (神城玲治, Shinjo Reiji)
Voiced by: Ryuuji Kasahara
Reiji is known as Hanamura's greatest "masterpiece", with his techniques involving very powerful shots known as Mirage. The powerful shots are indistinguishable from a regular return or serve, leaving opponents confused. Another technique he has is the Deep Impulse, which is a powerful shot that also can be used as a serve that will injure the opponent, and consecutive attempts to return the Deep Impulse may injure the player to the point of unable to play tennis anymore.

Yohei Tanaka (田中洋平, Tanaka Yohei)
Voiced by: Chieko Higuchi
Yohei plays doubles with his younger, twin brother, Kouhei Tanaka (田中浩平, Tanaka Kouhei). He is often mistaken for a girl due to his short, dark pink hair. Kouhei is often in the same situation due to his long blue hair. He has very good hearing, which, together with his brother's good eyesight, allows them to predict their opponents moves.

Sho Ota (太田翔, Oota Shou)
Voiced by: Ryō Naitō
Ota is the doubles partner of Daichi Kiriyama (桐山大地, Kiriyama Daichi). His small body, combined with his partner's large body, forms the Thunderbolt, where Shou jumps off Daichi's shoulders and returns high shots. Daichi uses a powerful volleyshot, Cannon Volley, which is often the set up for Thunderbolt.

=== Rokkaku ===
Rokkaku Middle School (市立六角中学校, Rokkaku Chūgakkō) is a team based in the Chiba Prefecture, which focuses on training local children in tennis from an early age. They have a large playground and tennis court which is often used to train. They make the Kantō Tournament semi-finals, where they lose to Seigaku. They advance to the National Tournament, but they are upset by a dark horse team, Higa.

Oji (お爺, Ojī)
Oji is the coach of the team. He is an elderly man who manufactures creates special wooden rackets for his players, taking into consideration their skills and personality. A running gag in the series is his questionable age. Though he is old and it shows in his speech, he is extremely fast, and can easily defeat his own students in beach volleyball. Nanjirou comments that Oji was already an old man when he was in middle school (and mentioned a rumor of how Oji was already an old man in the 1850s), and was genuinely surprised to hear that he was still alive.

Kentaro Aoi (葵 剣太郎, Aōi Kentarō)
Voiced by: Toshiyuki Toyonaga
Kentaro Aoi is the freshman captain of the team due to his skill. He is cheerful and talkative, having been playing tennis under the guidance of Oji for years. Oji creates a special hexagonal racquet with the strings crossed in hexagons, which allows for better control. The racquet combined with his training regiment allows him to always hit to the same spot on his opponents side regardless of placement, which frustrates his opponents. He also uses his control to hit cord balls at any point. Aoi enjoys playing under pressure, so he frequently loses the first 4–5 games of his matches on purpose, in order to make them more exciting. In the manga, he thrives on setting conditions for himself, such as saying that he will only date ugly girls if he can't make a certain shot. He plays against Kaoru Kaido in the manga, but plays against Ryoma Echizen in the anime. He is played Kazumi Kawahara, Taiki Yoshida (2nd season), and Takuya Yashiro (3rd season) in the musicals and by Daiki Sano in the live-action film.

Kojiro Saeki (佐伯 虎次郎, Saeki Kojirō)
Voiced by: Katsuaki Arima
Saeki is Rokkaku's stern and confident vice-captain. He is a childhood friend of the Fuji brothers. Saeki excels in doubles with his outstanding game reading capabilities, being able to read where an opponent is going to run or hit the ball by watching the contractions of their muscles prior to their action. He is portrayed by Kanata Irei, Daisuke Utsumi (2nd season), and Kaname Futaba (3rd season) in the musicals.

Hikaru Amane (天根 ヒカル, Amane Hikaru)
Voiced by: Kosuke Takeuchi
Hikaru "Davide" Amane uses a custom racket that is the maximum legal length, which allows him to have a large range and disperse strong shots easily. He's also known for frequently making ridiculous puns that often frustrates the people around him. He is portrayed by Airu Shiozaki, Atsushi Kimura (2nd season), and Reiji Sakagaki (3rd season) in the musicals, and by JURI in the live-action film.

Harukaze Kurobane (黒羽 春風, Kurobane Harukaze)
Voiced by: Kazehiro Oguro
'Harukaze "Bane" Kurobane is very popular amongst the kids that often stand on Rokkaku's playgrounds. Like Davide, Bane's tennis also uses the opponent's power to generate strong shots of his own; however, Bane focuses on the baseline, whereas Davide plays at the net. He is portrayed by Gaku Shindo, Shota Motokawa (2nd season), and Kento Hinata (3rd season) in the musicals.

Marehiko Itsuki (樹 希彦, Itsuki Marehiko)
Voiced by: Takehiro Hasu
Itsuki is a very curious player who never stops asking about everything that happens around him, sometimes going to the extreme of chasing a person around if he doesn't satisfy his curiosity. He often deeply breathes through his nose, which seems bull-like. He is skilled in hitting balls without a spin and reaching balls close to the ground, due to his experience with clam digging. Besides practicing for the tennis team, he enjoys spending a majority of his time on the beach. He is portrayed by Shoma Ikegami and Shinichi Hashimoto (2nd season), Shinnosuke Takagi (3rd season) in the musicals.

Ryo Kisarazu (木更津 亮, Kisarazu Ryō)
Voiced by: Hiroki Takahashi
Ryo is the older twin brother of Atsushi Kisarazu. Mizuki attempts to scout Ryou, but ends up with his brother. He is never seen playing in the manga, and though he is seen playing only once in the anime, the official fanbook notes that he has a special move titled the "Sky High Volley". He is portrayed by Ryosuke Kato, Daisuke Hirose (2nd season), and Yugo Sato (3rd season) in the musicals.

Satoshi Shudo (首藤聪, Satoshi)
Voiced by: Takayuki Kondō (TV series), Toshiyuki Kusuda (OVA)
Satoshi is made fun of for being a minor member of the regulars. He is titled the team's "poison taster" and dreams of tasting America's fabled turkey flavored soda. He is portrayed by Kota Chiba (3rd season) in the musicals.

=== Rikkaidai ===
Rikkaidai Junior High School (私立立海大附属中学校, Shiritsu Rikkaidai Fuzoku Chūgakkō) is located in the Kanagawa prefecture and is considered to be the best middle school team, having won the Japanese National tournament the last two years. They aim for perfect wins in the matches winning the Nationals for the third year. They are fully introduced during the Kantō Tournament, where they easily crush Fudomine in the semi-finals. In the finals, however, they suffer a loss to Seigaku, and return to the Nationals to try to beat Seigaku to fulfill their 3rd win in the Nationals. They make their way all the way through to the finals of the Nationals, but they are once again defeated by Seigaku, ending their hopes of winning a third straight title. Takeshi Konomi mentioned in an interview that he was not sure who would be in the finals between Nagoya Seitoku and Rikkadai, but he decided on Rikkaidai finding them were more interesting.

Seiichi Yukimura (幸村 精市, Yukimura Seiichi)
Voiced by: Sachiko Nagai (Japanese); Robbie Daymond (English)
Seiichi is the captain of Rikkaidai, and is known as one of the Big Three, who has a strong willpower, stern, brutally honest attitude on court. He is called "The Child of God"(demigod) due to his strength in the tennis court. He is one of the few who can activate Muga No Kyouchi, but is never seen using it. He can return any kind of shot with little effort, and his invincible appearance induces yips, a temporary mental condition that physically freezes up the sufferer due to a lack of self-confidence or fear of injury. Despite his strength, he has a very frail and feminine appearance, and he is very friendly to others outside of the court. He is hospitalized for much of the series due to some neurological disease resembling Guillain–Barré syndrome, which left him unlikely to ever play tennis again, but undergoes a successful surgery and rehabilitation during the Kanto tournament and was able to participate in the National tournament. In The Prince of Tennis II, his yips ability evolves further. He can now induce the illusion of victory in others, which allows him to hit a winning return while the opponent thinks the point is already over. He took the No. 11 position on the U-17 first string with little to no difficulty. He is also one of the 14 middle schoolers to represent Japan at the U-17 world cup, where he experiences yips himself for the first time but subsequently overcomes it. He teamed up with Tokugawa Kazuya for a doubles match with Germany's captain pro player Jurgen Valicevic Volk and middle schooler Frankensteiner. His skill resonates with Tokugawa and they developed "Sixth Sense" where they can instantaneously predict the path of the ball and return it effectively. They lost when Jurgen Valicevic Volk hit Whirlpool Baptism which forcibly spin's the racket out of the play's grip. He is portrayed by Ren Yagami, Toshiki Masuda (1st season), Keisuke Kaminaga (2nd season), and Toshiki Tateishi (3rd season) in the musicals.

Genichiro Sanada (真田 弦一郎, Sanada Gen'ichirō)
Voiced by: Taiten Kusunoki (Japanese); Ian Sinclair (English)
Sanada is the vice captain of Rikkaidai, known as the "Emperor", who fills in for Yukimura in Singles 1 during his hospitalization. The second of Rikkaidai's Three Demons, he comes from a very traditional family, is stern and noble, plays with honor (though condescendingly so), and expects the best from himself and his teammates. When his teammates don't live up to his expectations, or act in a way that brings shame to their team, Sanada will slap them across the face. Sanada practices kendo and combines it with his tennis techniques. His main rival is Tezuka, who he lost to despite being the runner-up to Yukimura in the Junior tournament, and vows to train and defeat him. He uses a family of techniques called "Wind, Forest, Fire, Shadow, Mountain, Lightning" (Fuu Rin Ka In Zan Rai), though he initially seals off Shadow and Lightning to prepare for the match with Tezuka. Wind, based on the drawing of a sword, is a high speed shot nearly invisible to the eye. Forest neutralizes the spin of a ball. Fire is a power shot that can be hit as a smash, forehand, or backhand. Shadow hides his weaknesses and makes him unreadable, particularly against the Saiki Kinpatsu no Kiwami. Mountain was never fully depicted, but Atobe has remarked he was always defeated by it before completing his World of Ice technique, and Sanada uses it to win stamina battles. Lightning allows Sanada to practically teleport to the ball and hit a shot that has so much spin it can burn through racket guts with ease. Beyond all these shots, Sanada can further enhance his play style by using Muga no Kyouchi. In the anime, Sanada possesses two different shots he does not have in the manga, the Invisible Swing and Invisible Serve. These shots involve Sanada moving his racket extremely quickly, and making the exact path of the ball difficult to see with the naked eye. The manga shots replace the Invisible Shot and Serve in the OVA of the Nationals. In The Prince of Tennis II, he acquires a new technique called Black Aura which allows him to change the direction of his shots after hitting them. He is one of the 14 middle schoolers to be chosen for the Japan U-17 team. For some reason, he now wears a bandaid over his left eye after training in the hidden U-17 camp but the cause of injury was never shown and he has yet to take it off. He is portrayed by Kentarou Kanesaki (1st season), Ken Ogasawara (2nd season), and Shougo Tazuru (3rd season) in the musicals, and by Eiji Moriyama in the live-action film.

Renji Yanagi (柳 蓮二, Yanagi Renji)
Voiced by: Eiji Takemoto (Japanese); Kieran Flitton (English)
Renji, known as the Data Master, is the third of the Three Demons of Rikkaidai. Yanagi usually plays in doubles. He is the friend and former doubles partner of Sadaharu Inui, who calls him "Professor." He keeps his eyes perpetually half-closed just as Inui hides his eyes behind his thick glasses. He is Inui's rival in using Data Tennis having taught Inui in the first place, which he himself learned from Akuto. Like Inui, Renji's data tennis focuses on predicting his opponents' movements, but he can also predict their thought patterns and what they'll say next, effectively breaking his opponents' confidence as he knows their next move before even they do. He possesses two special techniques, the Kamaitachi, a high speed slice shot, and the Utsusemi, a slice shot that does not bounce. In The Prince of Tennis II, he eventually takes the No. 17 position on the U-17 first string. He joins Inui as part of the All-Japan intel support team. He is portrayed by Kento Ono, Yuki Yamaoki (1st season), Atomu Mizuishi (2nd season), and Takuma Isawa (3rd season) in the musicals, and by Mamoru Miyano in the live-action film.

Akaya Kirihara (切原 赤也, Kirihara Akaya)
Voiced by: Showtaro Morikubo (Japanese); Austin Tindle (English)
Akaya is the youngest and only second year student in the Rikkaidai regulars, thus earning him the title "Second Year Ace". He is known for completing his official matches in under 15 minutes and his high level of concentration, which never seems of waver no matter how long he plays. Originally joining Rikkaidai because he thought he could be "the number one player at the number one school", Sanada eventually crushes him but convinces him to strive to someday defeat the Three Demons. He is quite friendly and talkative, but very violent and arrogant on the court, often causing serious injuries that require hospitalization. He reforms in the anime after being beaten by Fuji, (though he retains his nature in the manga) but in the nationals, he returns to his violent playing style, severely injuring Inui. While under high pressure or after sustaining injury, the whites of his eyes turn red, becoming bloodshot, and his power, skill, and speed increase. He becomes much more violent while in this state. Later, he develops a Devil Mode, which turns his skin red and his hair white. His bloodlust and destructive power are greatly enhanced, and he solely focuses on crushing the opposing players using violent means. Kirihara's trademark shot is the Knuckle Serve, a more powerful and extreme version of the Twist Serve, in which the serve can jump in any direction. As a player who can use "Muga no Kyouchi", Kirihara has also used many other shots originally belonging to other players. In The Prince of Tennis II, it is revealed that his Devil Mode has life-threatening consequences with continued use, implying that the ability is a form of self-induced vasodilation. With Shiraishi's help, he develops the much safer, equally powerful alternative Angel Mode, and loses his violent tendencies. He becomes one of the 14 middle schoolers to represent Japan at the U-17 world cup. He is portrayed by Genki Okawa (1st season), Motohisa Harashima (2nd season), and Ryutarou Maeda (3rd season) in the musicals. In the 3rd character popularity poll for the series, Kirihara came in 7th place.

Hiroshi Yagyu (柳生 比呂士, Yagyū Hiroshi)
Voiced by: Eisuke Tsuda (Japanese); Josh Bangle (English)
Hiroshi is known as "the Gentleman" for his polite demeanor. In the anime, he uses a Golf Swing shot is an adaptation of a golf swing from his days in the golf club prior to his recruitment to the tennis team. In the manga, his special move is the Laser Beam, an extremely high speed technique that is difficult to return. He and his doubles partner, Nio, pull off a switch where each impersonates the other in appearance, personal, and play style for half the game. He is portrayed by Toru Baba (1st season), Ryosuke Mikata (2nd season), and Yuta Oosumi (3rd season) in the musicals.

Masaharu Nio (仁王 雅治, Niō Masaharu)
Voiced by: Yūki Masuda (Japanese); Wayne Grayson (English)
Nio, (sometimes spelled Niou) known as "the Trickster", is able to completely copy the techniques and play style of other players creating the illusion his opponent is facing another person. It isn't perfect, as there are moves that he cannot copy and he is limited by his own physical abilities. He often copies his doubles partner, Yagyu, to confuse their opponents. He can predict the moves of his opponents up to ten steps ahead. In The Prince of Tennis II, he takes the No. 15 position from the U-17 first string, and later moves up to No. 9/10, and later becomes one of the 14 middle schoolers to represent Japan at the U-17 world cup. He is portrayed by Masataka Nakagauchi (1st season), Hidetoshi Kubota (2nd season), and Dai Goto (3rd season) in the musicals.

Bunta Marui (丸井 ブン太, Marui Bunta)
Voiced by: Naozumi Takahashi (Japanese); Mike Haimoto (English)
Marui volley specialist and doubles partner with his friend Jackal Kuwahara. Despite not moving much during matches, he has stamina issues (though this suggests his stamina use is mostly from focusing while waiting), so he overdoses on sugar by always eating cake before matches and chewing gum during matches. Jirou Akutagawa of Hyotei idolizes Marui and bases his style off of Marui's style, following a game they played in the Newcomers Tournament when they were both first years. Marui is a net specialist, and his trademark shots include Tightrope Walking, a shot that rolls along the top of the net before dropping in, Iron Pole Strike, a similar shot which runs to the end and bounces off the iron pole, and Temporal Difference Hell, a smash feint where he catches the ball at a different angle at the last second, returning it in an unpredictable manner. In The Prince of Tennis II, he develops a new technique, Perfect Fortress, that allows him to play defense at the net rather than just waiting for an opportunity for offense all the time. He is chosen as one of the 14 middle schoolers to represent Japan at the U-17 world cup. He is portrayed by Renn Kiriyama, Mio Acaba (1st season), Junpei Yasukawa (2nd season), and Taka Ooyabu (3rd season) in the musicals.

Jackal Kuwahara (ジャッカル 桑原, Jakkaru Kuwahara)
Voiced by: Nobuyuki Hiyama (Japanese); Bill Butts (English)
Jackal is half-Brazilian, known as the "Iron Wall of Defense" and the "Man with Four Lungs" for his incredible stamina, on par with Kaido's. He shaves his head as a tribute to his old coach in Brazil. At the Kanto finals, Jackal is shown to have the arm training Kaido has to use the Boomerang Snake. He wears 20 kg (44 lbs) arm weights in order to train. Though he follows his team to the U-17 camp in The Prince of Tennis II, he feels that he has been superseded by Kite, who takes his place as Marui's partner during the match against the U-17 first string. He is portrayed by Jutta Yuuki, Shingo Toda (1st season), Kouhei Shiota (2nd season), and Yusaku Kawasaki (3rd season) in the musicals.

=== Shitenhoji ===
Shitenhoji Middle School (四天宝寺中学校, Shitenhōji Chūgakkō) is one of the strongest teams in the Kansai region. Though the team loses to Rikkai in previous year's semi-finals, the members puts up the strongest fight against Rikkai with more willpower than any other team's. During the course of the series, they defeat Fudomine in the National Quarterfinals, but once again lose in the semi-finals, this time to Seigaku.

Osamu Watanabe (渡邊 オサム, Watanabe Osamu)
Voiced by: Koji Yusa
Osamu is the coach and adviser, noted by his team for having a very loud voice. He is portrayed by Yuki Kimisawa (2nd season), and Masato Saki (3rd season) in the musicals.

Kuranosuke Shiraishi (白石 蔵ノ介, Shiraishi Kuranosuke)
Voiced by: Yoshimasa Hosoya (Japanese); Joshua Waters (English)
Kuranosuke is the captain of Shitenhōji. He is heralded as having "Perfect Tennis", and is referred to as "The Bible of Shitenhōji." Due to Shiraishi's hard work, he masters the basic forms of tennis and gradually obtains the skill where he can perform strokes without mannerisms or habitual actions that can lessen the use of stamina, which has a great effect. Shiraishi himself believes that perfect tennis is silly notion and finds his own style boring, but continues to employ it because of how effective it is for winning. He uses the "Entaku Shot" which uses a massive sidespin to cause the ball to fly in a ring formation until it hits the course without bouncing. He is the first person to ever beat Fuji in an official singles match, as well as defeating all of Fuji's counters (save for the later-developed 6th counter). He is portrayed by Kyousuke Harukawa, Yoshihide Sasaki, Shintaro Anzai (2nd season), and Atsuki Mashiko (3rd season) in the musicals. He is shown to be wearing a bandage in his left arm. On numerous occasions, he pretends to remove it in order to keep Kintarou in-line, as the latter fears that Shiraishi is hiding a poison arm. In The Prince of Tennis II, it is revealed that he actually wears a gold arm guard under the bandages, which acts as his version of the wrist weights many other players use, but heavier. He is one of the 14 middle schoolers to represent Japan at the U-17 world cup. He is a perfectly balanced player having a score of 4.5 to all skill areas: speed, power, stamina, mental and technique. During U-17 match against Greece's captain, he froze and realized the difference in their strength which results to Shuji Tanegashima to play instead of him. With the help of the latter and inspiration from his teammates in Shintenhoji, he redeveloped his style and achieved "Star Bible" where he can instantaneously increase a certain skill area at a time to 7. And when doing so, he can hit his teammate's signature moves such as Hadokyu, Speed Star, and Mountain Storm.

Kenjiro Koishikawa (小石川 健二郎, Koishikawa Kenjirō)
Voiced by: Satoshi Hino
Kenjiro is the vice-captain, but has almost no role in the story. He was originally intended to play a larger role, but this was cut when Konomi had to move Chitose to Shitenhōji, and the team wound up with an extra player. He is portrayed by Shutaro Ando (3rd season) in the musicals.

Senri Chitose (千歳 千里, Chitose Senri)
Voiced by: Jun Osuka (Japanese); Nazeeh Tarsha (English)
Chitose originally played on the Shishigaku team with his close friend, Kippei Tachibana where the two guided Shishigaku to the National semi-finals in the previous season. This ended after the Nationals when Tachibana injures Chitose's eye during a practice match. They both leave tennis for a time, and Chitose eventually transfers to Shitenhōji, though at a lesser level due to blind spots in injured eye. Chitose and Tachibana eventually get reunited in the National Quarterfinals, where Chitose defeats his old friend in a close match. Although he intended to quit tennis after that match, he gets drawn back in to play Tezuka in the semi-finals, where he loses. Chitose discovers the State of Self Actualization, which allows him to copy techniques of other players perfectly, and through studying, finds the second of the "three doors", the Pinnacle of Great Wisdom. The power is focused on the mind, which allows him some foresight during rallies, giving him the ability to determine the fewest hits possible to win the point. His own original technique is the "Divine Disappearance", which allows him to make the ball appear as if it has disappeared by applying a large amount of topspin. Chitose was originally intended to still be with Shishigaku, but when Takeshi Konomi chose to bring Hyoutei back, he had to cut out Shishigaku's match with Seigaku, so he decided to move Chitose to Shitenhōji. Chitose has a little sister named Miyuki, age 8, who is very close to Tezuka, whom she calls "racket stealer". He is portrayed by Ryuuko Isogai, Masashi Oyama, Keisuke Higashi (2nd season), and Koki Emoto (3rd season) in the musicals.

Kenya Oshitari (忍足 謙也, Oshitari Ken'ya)
Voiced by: Jun Fukuyama (Japanese); Aaron Dismuke (English)
Kenya is known as Naniwa's Speed Star for his unparalleled speed that is far superior to even Fudoumine's Kamio Akira. He is Hyoutei's Yuushi Oshitari's cousin. He plays doubles with Hikaru Zaizen and sometimes Ishida Gin, but he selflessly agreed to sit through the Nationals semifinals so that his teammate, Chitose, could play Tezuka in the Doubles match that Kenya should've been in. Zaizen calls him "hetare" sometimes, which refers to how he is clumsy and weak-brained, such as the scene in Another Story OVA where he effortlessly runs past the Seigaku team despite arriving late, and, as he is laughing, crashes into a signpost and trips, falling to the floor. It is revealed in The Prince of Tennis II that, despite his amazing speed, his balance is extremely poor, something he would later rectify by training with trip lasers. He later obtains the No. 18 position for the U-17 first string. He is portrayed by Takuya Uehara, Kouki Mizuta, Masato Saki (2nd season), and Chida Kouhei (3rd season) in the musicals.

Hikaru Zaizen (財前 光, Zaizen Hikaru)
Voiced by: Hirofumi Araki (Japanese); Aaron Campbell (English)
Hikaru is considered to be a genius, though he's never been seen playing a match. He is the doubles partner of Oshitari Kenya. Zaizen is not respectful to his senpai, often calling the Koharu and Yuuji "sick/gross" (and calling Kenya "weak-minded") as well as dissing Chitose after Chitose lost to Tezuka. He called Kawamura "Seigaku's extra baggage" and was reprimanded by Shiraishi. He is portrayed by Hisanori Satou, Bishin Kawasumi, Ryuji Satou (2nd season), and Ryota Hirono (3rd season) in the musicals.

Gin Ishida (石田 銀, Ishida Gin)
Voiced by: Masaya Takatsuka (Japanese); Mick Lauer (English)
Gin Ishida is a very serious, honorable, and stern player who is the older brother of Fudomine's Tetsu Ishida. Gin is the inventor of the powerful shot, Hadokyu, which is composed of 108 progressively stronger techniques. He can also nullify other's use of Hadokyu. He is the strongest middle school power player in Japan, until he loses his match against Takashi Kawamura in the Nationals after an extremely strong serve. Though incredibly strong already, his strength pales in comparison to the U-17's first string power player. Takeshi Konomi has stated that Gin is his favorite character from Shitenhouji. He is portrayed by Yuusuke Hirose, Yuuta Yoneyama, Keisuke Yamauchi (2nd season), and Ippei Mori (3rd season) in the musicals.

Koharu Konjiki and Yuuji Hitōji (金色 小春 & 一氏 ユウジ, Konjiki Koharu and Hitōji Yuuji)
Voiced by: Ryo Naitou (Koharu), Suguru Kumabuchi (Yuuji) (Japanese); Brendan Blaber (Koharu), Tom Laflin (Yuuji) (English)
Koharu Konjiki and Yuuji Hitōji are two homosexual doubles partners known for their "comedy tennis", which is used to disrupt the synchronization of the other team. Koharu uses data tennis, determining how to counter shots with his IQ of two hundred, allowing him to store a large amount of data without note-taking. Yuuji impersonates other players' voices after studying their behavior. They break up after they lose to Seigaku; while Yuuji is heartbroken and still chases after Koharu, Koharu assumes the typical "girl-bratty" personality, rejecting the boy and even tearing up some of the pictures he had of Yuuji in his bag (from fanbook 40.5, Shitenhouji bagchecks). Koharu is portrayed by Takeya Nishiyama, Manabu Iizumi, Kaita Fukushima (2nd season), and Rikito Morita (3rd season) in the musicals. Yuuji is portrayed by Ryo Hirano, Makoto Uenobori, Taishi Sugie (2nd season), and Tsubasa Yatsu (3rd season) in the musicals.

Kintaro Toyama (遠山 金太郎, Tōyama Kintarō)
Voiced by: Yū Sugimoto (Japanese); Caitlyn Elizabeth (English)
Kintaro is the youngest member of Shitenhoji and the team's strongest player, despite having only played tennis for less than a year to date. He is very carefree and naive, and appears to be an all-brawn-no-brains type of character despite being diminutive in size, often messing up names and sayings. He also has a strong sense of justice, with his motto being "pay back what you receive", which he inherited from a former pro tennis player who had briefly mentored him. He forms a rivalry with Ryoma, though they only get to play a single point. He uses a "Wild" tennis style that takes advantage of his near-limitless natural stamina and strength, being able to lift a scooter over his head and throw it with ease. His signature technique is the "Mountain Storm", during which he spins rapidly in the air, causing a massive amount of wind to stir, and delivers a powerful overhead smash stronger than Gin's strongest Hadokyuu. Chitose finds Kintaro as the player closest to achieving Tenimuhō no Kiwami (Pinnacle of Perfection), but the latter doesn't achieve it until The Prince of Tennis II. Kintaro has an extremely active imagination: after reading a manga about monsters with poison claws, he believes Shiraishi has poison claws under the bandages that he always wears around his left hand and arm, which the latter doesn't hesitate to exploit to keep the former well-behaved (this is a reference to Konomi's previous manga series; Cool -Rental Body Guard-). Kintarō's knowledge of Japanese is also shown to be weak, and he misreads the Kanji of Ryoma's family name 'Echizen' as 'Koshimae', which becomes a running gag among the other Shitenhoji regulars. In The Prince of Tennis II, he achieves the No. 14 position on the U-17 first string. He tries to take the No. 5 position, but loses, despite awakening the Pinnacle of Perfection during the latter match. He is one of the 14 middle schoolers to represent Japan at the U-17 world cup. He is portrayed by Yuuya Kido, Takuya Kawaharada, Kodai Matsuoka (2nd season), and Raima Hiramatsu (3rd season) in the musicals, and by Masato Wada in the live-action film.

=== Higa ===
Higa Middle School (比嘉中学校, Higa Chūgakkō) is the first team from the Okinawa Prefecture to make it past the Kyūshū tournament in twenty-six years. All its players are Okinawan martial artists, and incorporate their experience in their tennis style, such as with the "Shukuchihou" method of movement. They have poor sportsmanship, and are not afraid to use nasty methods in order to win. During the series, the team makes the Nationals for the first time, and defeat Rokkaku in the first round. However, they are defeated in straight sets by Seigaku in the second round.

Harumi Saotome (早乙女晴海, Saotome Harumi)
Harumi is the coach and encourages on-court violence, especially towards the coach of the other team. When his team is defeated, he attempts to abandon them, but Kite slams a tennis ball in his stomach, and forces him to watch the remaining match. In the anime, he abandons his team when it became clear that Kite would lose to Tezuka.

Eishiro Kite (木手 永四郎, Kite Eishirō)
Voiced by: Tarusuke Shingaki (Japanese); Ryan Colt Levy (English)
Kite is the captain, whose nicknames are "Killer" and "the Hitman", as well as receiving a reputation for defeating the aces of many other teams. He has an aggressive play style and can quickly figure out and target the opponent's weaknesses. He scouts various players and teaches them "Shukuchihou", a technique based on martial arts that gives the opponent the impression that the user is able to approach the net or baseline in one step from anywhere on the court. He is the only member that is able to use the "Shukuchihou" in any direction due to his balance. He also teaches them their signature techniques. Kite remains composed and polite in front of other teams, yet extremely condescending towards them, and if physically attacked, won't hesitate to strike back. His tennis style combines the "Shukuchihou" with other techniques such as his powerful "Big Bang" serve, and his "Habu", a shot that curves randomly, making it extremely difficult to return. Kite is one of the middle schoolers invited to the Japanese U17 team in The Prince of Tennis II. He plays a doubles match with Bunta against the U-17 first string but ultimately loses. He is portrayed by Luke.C, Kazumi Doi (2nd season), and Kento Muto (3rd season) in the musicals, and by Yuichi Tsuchiya in the live-action film.

Yujiro Kai (甲斐 裕次郎, Kai Yūjirō)
Voiced by: Daisuke Nakamura (Japanese); Ricco Fajardo (English)
Kai is the vice-captain who has a tendency to be brash and impulsive despite being the oldest member. Though he acknowledges his opponent's strength during the match, he trash-talks as much as his teammates do upon victory. He normally plays with his right hand, though he switches to his natural left-handed style while using a racket with a reverse grip to use his "Viking Horn" shot, which curves before reaching the opponent's side. He utilizes this attack by waiting for his opponents reaction and at the last second, strikes back to the opposite side of the reaction. He is portrayed by Hijiri Shinotani, Yoshihiko Aramaki (2nd season), and Tsubasa Yoshizawa (3rd season) in the musicals.

Hiroshi Chinen (知念 寛, Chinen Hiroshi)
Voiced by: Kazuya Sueyoshi (Japanese); River Kanoff (English)
Hiroshi is the tallest player in Higa Chuu, who uses his size and looks to mock and intimidate his opponents. He is portrayed by Takeshi Hayashino, Yu Yoshioka (2nd season), and Raita (3rd season) in the musicals.

Kei Tanishi (田仁志 慧, Tanishi Kei)
Voiced by: Youji Ueda (Japanese); Jalen K. Cassell (English)
Kei possesses a large body, which allows him to utilize his "Big Bang" serve that uses his weight and the gravity from falling in order to make a nearly unreternable serve. It takes a lot of stamina, which decreases its power over time, allowing it to be returned, which was taken advantage of by Ryoma. He is one of the former rivals of Ryoma who return to help him regain his memories. He is also well known for being a big eater. In The Prince of Tennis II, he is among the 50 middle school players who are invited to the Japanese U-17 team, where he loses a surprising amount of weight during his time training. He is portrayed by Yutaka Matsuzaki, Yuki Tomotsune (2nd season), and Makoto Takata (3rd season) in the musicals.

Rin Hirakoba (平古場 凛, Hirakoba Rin)
Voiced by: Hiroyuki Yoshino (Japanese); Samuel Drake (English)
Hirakoba is the only member who likes fair play. He uses Habu, which has the stance of a smash, except that it curves wildly and unpredictable while in the air and bouncing, and Giant Habu, which curves immediately after leaving the racket, though it causes his hand to go numb, limiting it to one use per match. Hirakoba is a very formidable player, being able to take out Fuji's triple counter and Takashi's Hadoukyuu. He is one of the few players to stand up to Coach Saotome, refusing an order to attack Seigaku's coach feeling the match was too interesting. He is portrayed by Yasuka Saito, Toshiyuki Someya (2nd season), and Naoya Iwaki (3rd season) in the musicals.

Tomoya Shiranui and Kouichi Aragaki (不知火知弥 & 新垣浩一, Shiranui Tomoya and Aragaki Kōichi)
Voiced by: Suguru Inoue (Shiranui), Rion Kako (Aragaki)
Shiranui and Aragaki are doubles partners, who, having grown up playing under an extremely hot sun, have extremely high endurance, which makes up for not being able to use the "Shukuchihou" technique. However, Shiranui's stamina still pales in comparison to Kaidou's. Shiranui is portrayed by Masashi Sonomura (3rd season) in the musicals. Aragaki is portrayed by Haruki Matsui (3rd season) in the musicals.

=== American Team (anime) ===
The American Team was part of the "Senbatsu Training Camp" and "Good Will Games" arc only seen in the anime of The Prince of Tennis.

Richard Baker (リチャードベイカー, Richādo Beikā)
Richard Baker is the American team's extremely strict, often unreasonable, coach, who views tennis merely as a show, and his pupils as the actors and pawns for success. He often expects his players to win or lose based on his idea of entertainment, and has little control over his temper when things don't go his way. He is a shrewd businessman, and is later fired for illegal use of funds on expensive advertising and promotion for his team.

Kevin Smith (ケビン・スミス, Kebin Sumisu)
Voiced by: Reiko Kiuchi
Kevin is the captain of the team. He wishes to play Ryoma to settle a rival feud between his father, George Smith, and Ryoma's father, Nanjiro Echizen (something the latter doesn't recognize). During the time Nanjiro first met Ryoma's mother, George was an arrogant, but pro tennis player that ran a club Nanjiro frequented. His Spartan training at youth lessons along with his obnoxiousness earned the ire of many, and Nanjiro eventually stepped in to defeat George in a humiliating 6-0 match. George becomes very strict with Kevin's training and eventually turns to alcohol after many years of mulling over his loss to Nanjiro, which causes Kevin to view him as worthless. Kevin largely copies Ryoma's tennis style, but also utilizes a highly destructive style of tennis as a show of power, likely a compensation of how he sees his father. When he and Ryoma meet up in the United States he shows a more cheerful and gentler side, without losing his competitiveness.

Arnold Ignashov (アーノルド・イグニショフ, Ānorudo Igunishofu)
Voiced by: Yoshiaki Matsumoto
Arnold is an immigrant from East Germany, who became disillusioned and turned to life as a street punk. He eventually finds a sports magazine, and signs up for classes under Baker. Not wanting to return to his previous lifestyle, he practices and wins every official match until playing Shusuke Fuji. Arnold is called a tennis machine because of his accuracy and the ability to predict and counter his opponent's shots. When he loses to Fuji in a close match, Baker fires him from the team, but is relieved to learn that, especially with Baker getting fired, he will not have to stop playing professional tennis.

Bobby Max (ボビー・マックス, Bobī Makkusu)
Voiced by: Hari Kaneko
Bobby is the tallest and most muscular of his teammates, earning him the nickname, "Beast Bulldozer." Bobby often struggles to control his temper and poor sportsmanship, which have gotten him banned from most sports in his school until being introduced to tennis, where he fares better as he does not come into physical contact with his opponent. Previously, Bobby played basketball and American football. He plays to a stalemate against Sengoku in the Good Will games.

Tom Griffy and Terry Griffy (トム・グリフィー & テリー・グリフィー, Tomu Gurifī and Terī Gurifī)
Voiced by: Kazunari Kojima (Tom), Maiko Itō (Terry)
Tom is the brother, as well as the doubles partner of his sister Terry. They were raised by their unloving aunt following the death of their parents. They support themselves and their aunt by dumpster diving and performing tennis tricks. Baker discovers them and "rescues" them from their aunt, something the twins are grateful for. The two utilize a special type of shot which Tom hits a shot at the back of Terry's head, and the latter dodges at the last second, allowing the shot to approach the opponent from a blind spot and thus difficult to return. They're the only ones to win their match during the Good Will games, having won against Kikumaru and Oshitari Yuushi.

Billy Cassidy (ビリー・キャシディ, Birī Kyashidi)
Voiced by: Yūto Kazama
Billy is a boy who moves to Los Angeles after being on a ranch most of his life. He begins to play tennis to become a person worthy of attention of Stephanie, the daughter of one of Baker's sponsors. Though he loses his Good Will match, Stephanie acknowledges him and wishes to learn tennis from him, leaving the latter overjoyed. He's seldom seen without a cowboy hat, and his ranch upbringing influences his tennis, as one of his shots is thrown at his opponents like a lasso.

Michael Lee (マイケル・リー, Maikeru Rī)
Voiced by: Isshin Chiba
Michael is the only son of a successful Chinese businessman, and is a United States immigrant. His father's personal philosophies of hard work and success shape Michael's personality and tennis play. He has also practiced kung fu for many years, enhancing his speed and reflexes when playing tennis, on par with Sanada's.

== High School Team ==
The high school team debuted in The Prince of Tennis II as members of the elite U-17 tennis camp for the All-Japan team. These high schoolers are noted as the top youth tennis players in Japan. Entry into the camp is only possible through invitation, and 50 middle schoolers from Prince of Tennis were invited to further develop their skills. The first string (composed of the top 20 members out of the 250 member pool, now 300 after the middle schoolers joined) regularly travels abroad to compete against other high school teams from other countries (also composed of the best of those countries). A vast majority of the high schoolers on the second string are extremely arrogant, looking down on the middle schoolers the moment they walked in the gates. However, the same majority quickly proved to be inferior to the middle schoolers in terms of skill.

Jūjirō Oni (鬼 十次郎, Oni Jūjirō)
Voiced by: Daichi Endo (Japanese); Richard Barcenas (English)
Known as the Gatekeeper of Hell, Oni is a member of the 5th Court on the High School team who plays to keep all lower ranked players from moving up, intended as a means of further train the second string. He is actually the strongest player on the first string, bearing the No. 5 badge. He removed himself from first string in order to train Tokugawa to be on first string, and subsequently remained on 5th court waiting for more players that have the same passion for tennis as he had. His original goal was to become the number one player in Japan in order to inspire a group of orphans whom he played with often. Despite his tough demeanor, he has a soft side and is willing to lend a helping hand to those in need. He eventually returns to the first string in order to test the middle schoolers. On the court, Oni is the main user of the Black Jack Knife and is skilled enough to defeat Momoshiro with a racket that has only two strings on it. He is noted to be only slightly stronger than the No. 1 Byoudouin, and is on par with the No. 2 player. Like Ryoma, who gives off the aura of a samurai when playing seriously, Oni has the aura of a demon when doing the same, a nod to his name. Oni also has access to the Pinnacle of Perfection. He is portrayed by Yuki Okamoto in the musicals.

Kazuya Tokugawa (徳川 カズヤ, Tokugawa Kazuya)
Voiced by: Daisuke Ono (Japanese); Daman Mills (English)
Originally a top player from abroad, Tokugawa is a member of the first court who had previously been humiliated in a match against Byoudouin. After that loss, he trained on the mountain and was helped by both Oni and Irie in order to get revenge against Byoudouin. His glare is apparently capable of dealing temporary Yips in the same manner as Yukimura's tennis. His tennis somehow incorporates the Divine Path of Asura, allowing him to increase the speed of his shots or make them bounce unpredictably. He also has a double-edge sword technique known as the Black Hole, which allows him to literally create a small rip in space-time to stop the ball, which from then he can almost always return a winning shot. Strangely, this power seems only seems to stop the momentum of an incoming shot and doesn't negate any pre-existing spin. Tokugawa can keep up this technique for only a half-hour at most, as any further use would make him cough up blood among other medical complications. Tokugawa also naturally possesses some level of clairvoyance, allowing him to "sense" (rather than predict) where and how his opponents will hit to next without the use of data, referred to as premonition. This ability would later evolve even further into the Sixth Sense after he plays doubles with Yukimura, allowing both of them to see into the future with complete accuracy on their opponent's next move. Although focused, he's a very polite person, and concerned for the welfare of others. He insists that he plays honorably regardless of how much of a disadvantage that would put him at, much to Byoudouin's chagrin. He later takes Ryoga's place on the first string after the latter drops out to return to America with Ryoma. He is portrayed by Kento Ono in the musicals.

Duke Watanabe (デューク 渡邊, Deyūku Watanabe)
The half-French, half-Japanese power player of the first string, bearing the No. 3 badge. His power is immense, greatly surpassing that of Ishida Gin's. Duke was previously part of the U-17 French team, where he was known as the Destroyer, up until two years ago. Byoudouin had saved Duke's younger sister from a collapsing roof of a building just before a major group league match in France at the time, where Duke would be his opponent. Unable to play properly due to his injuries, Byoudouin lost to Duke. Indebted to Byoudouin for saving his sister's life, Duke immediately jumped ship to join the U-17 Japanese team following the match. Duke is a generally a pleasant guy, referring to Byoudouin as "boss", and always lightly smiling with his eyes closed like Fuji. Most of the time, Duke appears laid back and seems to have a beer belly. In reality, when Duke flexes, he easily tears through his clothes and is shown to have a lot of muscle mass for his age. Despite this, Duke likes to hit soft shots just as much as his power shots. He is portrayed by Keisuke Ōkubo in the musicals.

Hōō Byōdōin (平等院 鳳凰, Byōdōin Hōō)
Voiced by: Hiroki Yasumoto (Japanese); Christopher R. Sabat (English)
The leader of the U-17 Japan team, bearing the No. 1 badge. Byoudouin is extremely aggressive and contemptuous towards the weak, which frequently puts him at odds with the more compassionate Oni. This nature came about when Byoudouin first lost to Oni in a match, but then amplified when Byoudouin protected Duke's younger sister from a collapsing roof. The injuries sustained from the accident made Byoudouin lose the subsequent match in a group league, forcing his team to drop out. The team blamed Byoudouin for the team's loss, and Byoudouin has since become bitter about any notion of self-sacrifice. Nevertheless, Byoudouin respects those that are truly strong and very much desires for the Japan team to reach the top of the tennis world. On the court, Byoudouin is known as the "Pirate of Japan" and uses a wide variety of techniques based on various cultures, even announcing their names in their native language when he uses them. Like Ryoma and Oni, Byoudouin has the aura of a ghost pirate when playing seriously, though his ability manifested only recently. Byoudouin likes to directly attack his opponents with his shots, much like Kirihara, and would often force his opponents to retire from competitive tennis permanently if they were not physically and mentally prepared to take such a beating. He is portrayed by Takashi Sasaki and Ray Fujita in the musicals.

Shūji Tanegashima (種ヶ島修二, Tanegashima Shūji)
Voiced by: Ryuji Kamiyama (Japanese); Daniel J. Edwards (English)
No. 2 on the U-17 first string. He suffers from aviophobia and thus does not always accompany the first string to matches abroad. When he does, he travels by ship and other means of ground transportation to reach said destination. While calm and pleasant most of the time, Tanegashima likes to troll his teammates, especially Sanada, both on and off the courts. He is also seen frequently riding around in a segway and doesn't seem to train as much as the other players. On the court, Tanegashima plays a very defensive form of tennis. He possesses the ability to see and neutralize any type of spin on the ball and return it as a drop shot that hardly bounces, known as "Mu". This is heavily implied to extend to power shots as well, as Oni notes that Tanegashima is the only player in the camp that he has never beaten. He is also extremely good at "Look Over There", as he can predict his opponents' movements flawlessly in an instant, while any ordinary player would have relied on guesswork. He is portrayed by Kentaro Akisawa in the musicals.

Kanata Irie (入江 奏多, Irie Kanata)
Voiced by: Hiroki Aiba (Japanese); Michael Kovach (English)
A player originally from the third court, who, like Oni, is much stronger than what his position implies and did not join the first string in order to train Tokugawa. He is an actor both on and off the court, faking weaknesses and struggles to either lull his opponents into a false sense of security or just to troll his teammates. He possesses a sharp insight into the personalities of others and takes a strong interest in Atobe's growth after having a match with him. At full power, Irie is an extremely fast and technical player who is able to hit winners off of nearly any and every situation, all without any flashy special moves like the other characters use. He is a very kind and pleasant individual, but his acting often gets on the nerves of those around him, as no one is ever quite sure as to whether he is currently acting or not. He also likes to play the saxophone at night. He later takes the No. 20 position on the first string and takes the No. 11 position for the U-17 world cup. He is portrayed by Hiroki Aiba and Kazuaki Yasue in the musicals.

Ikuto Kimijima (君島育斗, Kimijima Ikuto)
Voiced by: Kei Hosogai (Japanese); Reagan Murdock (English)
No. 7 on the first string. Ikuto is a tricky player who often engages in negotiations with his opponents before his matches, often striking a deal of sorts in order to ensure his victory, though he does seem to have ulterior motives when doing so. He also stars in a series of commercials for soft drinks and other sports related products, making him a fairly recognizable celebrity and also appears to be very well-connected to influential people around the world. This provides him with numerous resources to fuel his negotiations and support his team. He's very calm and analytical, even when pressured. However, he does show significant contempt towards his doubles partner, Tohno. He is portrayed by Yuta Kashizawa and Yuta Hoshino in the musicals.

Atsukyō Tōno (遠野 篤京, Tōno Atsukyō)
Voiced by: Yusuke Katayama (Japanese); Lucien Dodge (English)
No. 8 on the first string. Atsukyou is a very sadistic player with a rude and demeaning personality to match. He is easily the most prideful and arrogant player on the first string, and won't hesitate to attack his own teammates with a tennis ball if he feels they've let go of their pride. On the court, he uses a series of dangerous moves known as executions where he directly attacks his opponents that, unlike Kirihara's and Byoudouin's brute force attacks, target specific body parts and can completely paralyze the opponent once enough executions are received. Each execution is named after a real-world execution method used in human history, depending on the part of the body targeted. Somewhat ironically, Atsukyou has a plate over his left knee from a previous unknown incident. Attacking it directly causes him great pain and warrants medical attention and brief rehabilitation. He is portrayed by Teruma in the musicals.

Akuto Mitsuya (三津谷あくと, Mitsuya Akuto)
Voiced by: Atsushi Kousaka (Japanese); J. Michael Tatum (English)
No. 17 on the first string before Renji took the position. Akuto is a data tennis player like Inui and Renji, and actually taught Renji data tennis himself during a chance encounter when the latter was just returning home one day. Unlike Inui and Renji, Akuto's eyes can actually be seen a majority of the time. He provides intel support to the Japan team during the U-17 world cup, and even creates disgusting rice balls, known as Akuto Meshi, akin to Inui's special juices, for the team as motivation to not fail. Eating one not only knocks a person out (including Fuji), but also potentially dislocates all of their joints.

Ryoga Echizen (越前 リョーガ, Echizen Ryoga)
Voiced by: Yuuta Yamazaki (Futari no Samurai film), Mamoru Miyano (OVA) (Japanese); Howard Wang (English)
Ryoga Echizen (Origin story from Futari no Samurai was rewritten for this manga) is Ryoma's long lost older half-brother who is frequently seen eating oranges. Ryoga is Nanjirou's first child from a previous relationship prior to meeting Ryoma's mom, Rinko. Though they grew up together as kids, Ryoga was forced to separate from Ryoma after Ryoga's aunt from his late mother's side won a custody battle with Nanjirou. It is unknown how old Ryoga actually is since he's apparently not a student, though given the rules of the U-17 camp, he would have to be 15–17. Like Ryoma, Ryoga possesses a cocky and fearless demeanor, but is less stiff and doesn't give people the silent treatment as often as Ryoma would. He frequently teases Ryoma over little things and calls him "chibi-suke". He takes the No. 4 slot of the U-17 first string while they were abroad and trains Ryoma to prepare him for the world cup. Despite his immense skill level, Ryoga seems to have little interest in team competitions or even becoming a pro, and would rather just have a real match with his little brother, echoing the dream Nanjirou had for Ryoma when the former retired from being a pro. Shortly after Ryoma gets kicked out of the U-17 camp, Ryoga leaves his position behind as well and gets Ryoma to follow him to join the U-17 American team instead. The full extent of Ryoga's abilities remain unknown. He is portrayed by Yuki Izawa in the musicals.

Tsukimitsu Ochi (越知月光, Ochi Tsukimitsu)
Voiced by: Takafumi Kawakami (Japanese); Ray Chase (English)
Former captain of Hyotei's tennis team, bears the No. 9 badge on the first string. Though he and Atobe have never met, Atobe credits him as the one who brought Hyotei to the national level. Of all the taciturn characters in the series, Ochi is perhaps the most stoic and unsentimental. He rarely speaks, and when prompted, usually says something along the lines of "I don't care" or "not interested". On the court, he has perhaps the fastest serve of all the Japanese players known as the Mach. Owing to his ideal height and reach, Ochi can perform high speed serves to the corners that are difficult to see, let alone return. He is also known as the Mental Assassin, as eye contact with him at close range can greatly increase the stress and anxiety a player feels, which translates into committing many unforced errors. Despite losing the No. 9 badge to Atobe, he remains part of the U-17 team for the world tournament. He is portrayed by Kei Sonan in the musicals.

Jusaburō Mōri (毛利寿三郎, Mōri Juzaburō)
Voiced by: Kenji Nojima (Japanese); Christian La Monte (English)
Currently the youngest player on the high school first string, being only a high school 1st year. He was formerly a member of the Rikkaidai tennis team. He is described as an all-rounder and a very skilled player, but according to Renji, had habitually skipped club practices in middle school. Unlike his doubles partner Ochi, Mōri will often throw in casual comments on his current observations, making him more amiable of the two. Despite his laid back personality, he is shown to have incredible determination to win, as he forcibly dislocated his own shoulder in order to return Atobe's World of Ice at match point. Despite losing the No. 10 badge to Nio, he remains part of the U-17 team for the world tournament. He is portrayed by Ryusei Maruyama in the musicals.

Yūdai Yamato (大和 祐大, Yamato Yūdai)
Voiced by: Masanori Ikeda (Japanese); Xander Mobus (English)
Seigaku tennis club's captain during Tezuka's freshman year. He was the only reason Tezuka stayed with the tennis club after the latter received an injury from an egotistical senpai. He is described as not being very strong, and lost to Tezuka handily during his time as captain. Eccentric, insightful, and gentle, Yamato always wore a pair of dark sunglasses and is described as "flowing as the rivers do". In the anime, coach Ryuzaki asks him for his guidance when they go to a training camp to prepare for the Kantō conference final against Rikkai. In the manga, he reappears The Prince of Tennis II without his trademark sunglasses as a player on the No. 3 court, and plays against Tezuka one more time. This time, Yamato gives Tezuka a run for his money by showing his ability to trick opponents into thinking they're hitting the ball when they're actually nowhere near it. Yamato reveals that shortly before Tezuka's arrival at Seigaku, he had severely injured his arm to help Seigaku win and had to undergo surgery and rehab afterwards in order to play again. Knowing that the fear of losing and disappointing others is the only thing holding Tezuka back, he encourages Tezuka to play for himself rather than the team, advice that allows Tezuka to finally access the Pinnacle of Perfection. Tezuka is able to beat Yamato after this, and a satisfied Yamato decides to retire from competitive tennis. He is portrayed by Yunosuke Matsushima in the musicals.

== Foreign Teams ==
The following characters debuted in The Prince of Tennis II, belonging to U-17 teams from outside of Japan that have gathered for the U-17 World Cup. The rankings listed are the most recent, with Japan at No. 23. Each of the 32 countries participating can bring up to 14 high school (Youth division) and 14 middle school (Jr. Youth division) players to the competition. To represent a country, a player only needs to have an address of residence in said country, highlighting the philosophy that tennis should not have any national boundaries.

=== German Team ===
Ranked No. 1 in the world, the German Team's level of skill far surpasses that of their nearest competitor, Switzerland. They have won the U-17 World Cup nine times consecutively prior to the series' start. Tezuka joins this team after leaving Japan as a part of his pre-requisites to going pro. The U-17 German team is notable for having three pro-level players on their team for this year's World Cup despite the age restriction of 17 and under.

Jürgen Borisovich Volk (ユルゲン・ボリソビッチ・ボルク, Yurugen Borisobitchi Boruku)
Voiced by: Kentarō Tone
Jürgen is a Pro-level captain of the German U-17 team and Tezuka's personal coach, known as the "Philosopher of Victory". Despite being only 17, Volk is considered one of the greatest up and coming pros in today's tennis world, so much so that almost everyone knows his face and name. Like Tezuka, he's taciturn, disciplined, and strict. He points out flaws in posture and character for his teammates in the middle of matches, and even offers constructive criticism or praise for his opponents where appropriate. Though he clearly holds a lot of pride in his team, he is modest, calm, and never assumes his victory is assured. He is also able to use the Whirlpool Baptism, a shot with a powerful vortex spin that forcibly spins a racket out of a player's grip. Volk rarely uses this move though, as he believes reliance on such techniques makes for a weaker tennis player.

Q.P.
Voiced by: Mitsuki Saiga
The staff officer of the German U-17 representatives. Q.P. stands for "quality of perfection" and is just a nickname for this player, with his real name and birthplace unknown (at least to Japan's intel team). This is because Q.P. was originally brought up in an orphanage before coming to Germany's top tennis academy. His lack of emoting even as a child caused a lot of friction with the staff there, but the U-17 coach took it upon himself to train Q.P. personally. Despite not being a pro, he is extremely strong and is just as recognizable to the tennis community as Volk is.

Michael Bismarck (ミハエル・ビスマルク, Mihaeru Bisumaruku)
Voiced by: Yōhei Azakami
A highly technical player who starts out acting arrogant towards Japan but comes to respect them as opponents during the main U-17 tournament. He's known to win every single tie-break game he enters, motivated to win by his girlfriend back home. He also is very interested in vehicular racing and can speak Japanese. He was unofficially offered an opportunity to go pro after the tournament.

Elmar Siegfried (エルマー・ジークフリート, Erumā Jīkufurīto)
Voiced by: Chiharu Sawashiro
A middle school player who suffers from an inferiority complex, frequently lashing out verbally on and off the court, even being borderline racist towards Tezuka during their early encounters. Frustrated with himself over the fact he was forever stuck in second place at every competition he entered, he would slowly learn to have more confidence in himself as the tournament progressed, eventually unlocking the Pinnacle of Perfection for himself.

A. Frankensteiner (A・フランケンシュタイナー, A Furankenshutainā)
Voiced by: Ryūnosuke Watanuki
A middle school player who rarely speaks, referred to as the a Tennis Cyborg. He's known for his incredible accuracy, able to aim accurately for even the smallest gaps consistently.

=== Swiss Team ===
Ranked No. 2 in the world, the Swiss Team is considered Germany's closest rival and is the only other team to have a pro-level player among their ranks.

=== French Team ===
Ranked No. 3 in the world, the French Team was also home to Duke Watanabe before he joined the Japanese Team.

Leopold Camus (レオポルド・カミュ, Reoporudo Kamyu)
Voiced by: Hikaru Midorikawa
The captain of the French U-17 team. He is known to be a very clever tactician, so much so that others believe that he alone will be able to somehow shift how professional tennis is played on a global scale. His strength in tennis comes from a rather passionate love for the sport itself, able to utilize a variant of the Pinnacle of Perfection in his matches.

Ludovic Chardard
A middle school first year who goes by the title The Prince of Aces, known for his incredible ability to return every shot with an ace, and is an expert horseback rider. He claims to be of royal heritage, but it would be impossible for him to be descended from French royalty due to death of the entire royal family following the French Revolution, implying that he isn't originally from France. Brash and condescending, he quickly forms a rivalry with Ryoma after forming a crush on Ryoma's love interest, Sakuno.

=== Spanish Team ===
Ranked No. 4 in the world, the Spanish Team is the last of the Big 4.

=== American Team ===
Currently ranked No. 5 in the world, Ryoma joins this team on Ryoga's invitation following his expulsion from camp. This team bears no association with the team from the Goodwill games in the anime arc or even mentions them. The team hopes to finally break into the Big 4 hierarchy this year. Oddly enough, no middle school representatives have been shown for this team, and Ryoma occupies the 14th slot of the high school representatives.

Ralph Reinhardt (ラルフ・ラインハート, Rarufu Rainhāto)
Voiced by: Hiroki Takahashi
The captain of the American U-17 team. He is noted to have great mental strength and is a very strong leader. He has a special skill of course-correcting immediately, allowing him to overcome weaknesses after just one point, enabling him to counter his opponents very quickly.

Dodo Obando (ドードー・オバンド, Dōdō Obando)
Voiced by: Kenjiro Tsuda
Known as the Birdman, Dodo is capable of jumping incredible heights (upwards to several meters), allowing him to return opponent's smashes that would otherwise bounce far and away from the court. He is a friendly, out-going individual who can be frequently found riding around on his motorcycle.

Kiko Balentien (キコ・バレンタイン, Kiko Barentain)
Voiced by: Takayuki Kondō
An excitable high school first-year representative who has a very feminine appearance. He is very fascinated with Ryoma's unsentimental nature and skill level, and constantly speaks up on Ryoma's behalf, even showing some degree of concern for him. For some reason, he always keeps one pant leg rolled up relative to the other. His conversations with Ryoga suggest that they have known each other for a significant amount of time. He always wins his sets 6-4, even against Ryoma.

Alan Hopkins (アラン ホップスキンズ, Aran Hoppusukinzu)
Voiced by: Naru Kawamoto
Better known as Doctor Alan Hopkins (likely on track to study medicine). He has the ability to draw out and exacerbate physical pain in an opponent if they have a history of physical injury from playing tennis, making him uniquely strong against even higher level players who have ever suffered from a major injury, even if they've long since recovered.

Rocky Meredith (ロッキー メレディス, Rokkī Meredisu)
Voiced by: Masaya Onosaka

Maxwell (マクスウェル, Makusū~eru)
Voiced by: Kōhei Kiyasu

Oliver Philips (オリバー・フィリップス, Oribā Firippusu)
An administrative staff member for the U.S. team. Oliver has dreams of becoming an American U-17 representative himself someday despite not being very talented, but is pleasant and modest about it. He helps Ryoma buy time for the team by posing as Ryoga (just by wearing Ryoma's jacket) when the U.S. team fails to show up on time for their exhibition match against the Tube Republic. Likely due his last minute call, Oliver initially lacks a lot of the mental strength necessary to play tennis competitively and falters a lot early on, but shows a surprising amount of determination to win later on. With Ryoma's subtle support, he was able to take at least one game before the two win their whole set.

=== English Team ===
Ranked No. 7 in the world, the members of this team are mostly Atobe's former grade school classmates.

=== Greek Team ===
Ranked No. 10 in the world, some members of this team greatly resemble the iconic real-world statues of characters from Greek myth and culture. Their coach, for example, resembles The Thinker by Auguste Rodin.

Thalatta Heracles (タラッタ・ヘラクレス, Taratta Herakuresu)
Voiced by: Tomokazu Seki
A high school 3rd year representative, whose namesake comes from the Greek demigod of strength (Roman name Hercules) and also resembles the statue of Heracles by Lysippos. He has several special moves at his disposal, least of which is an aura known as the Silver White Light of Mt. Olympus, which greatly increases his mobility. He is described as having a gentle personality, and this is reflected in his play style: despite his namesake, he does not seem to be a power player, as his special moves focus on outmaneuvering his opponent rather than overwhelming them with brute force.

Papadopoulos Evangelos (パパドプロス・エヴァンジェロス, Papadopurosuevu Anjerosu)
Voiced by: Tomokazu Seki
A middle school 3rd year representative who is so far the only one on his team who does not have a name derived from mythology. Though a capable and agile player himself, able to jump high enough to catch Oishi's Moon Volley, he does not possess any special moves of his own.

Zeus Iliopoulos (ゼウス・イリオポウロス, Zeusu Iriopourosu)
Voiced by: Tomokazu Seki
The captain of the Greek representatives, named after the King of the Greek Gods on Mt. Olympus. Compared to his teammates, he is much more youthful in appearance, shorter, and less muscular, likely because he is only a high school 1st year. Nevertheless, he is an incredibly capable player whose skill rivals that of Tanegashima. He is one of many players who specialize in reading opponent mental states and outmaneuvering them.

Hermes Kounellis (ヘルメス・クネリス, Herumesu Kunerisu)
Voiced by: Tomokazu Seki
A high school 3rd year representative, whose namesake comes from the Messenger of Olympian Gods.

Vulcan Lartius (バルカン・ラエルティオス, Burukan Raerutiosu)
Voiced by: Tomokazu Seki
A high school 3rd year representative, whose namesake, strangely enough, comes from the Roman God of Fire (Greek equivalent being Hephaestus).

Apollon Stephanopoulos and Orion Stephanopoulos (アポロン・ステファノプロス & オリオン・ステファノプロス, Aporon Sutefanopurosu and Orion Sutefanopurosu)
Voiced by: Tomokazu Seki
Middle school brothers who form a doubles pair. Apollon is named after Apollo, the Greek God of the Arts, Knowledge, and Truth. Orion is named after the hunter who was placed among the stars by Zeus. The brothers are said to be descended from a historic family of executioners, and incorporate violent play styles in their tennis, making them very similar to Tohno and Kirihara.

=== Australian Team ===
Ranked No. 18 in the world, this is the home team of this year's world cup.

=== Tube Republic Team ===
Ranked No. 32 in the world, this fictional country gained its independence from an unspecified nation just 30 years ago. The team members speak in a fictional language. Only two high schoolers have been shown, with the rest of their team nowhere in sight. Other than Japan, Tube is the only other country in the tournament whose world rank has improved as drastically following the pre-World Cup.

M. Nobtail (M.ノブテール, M. Nobutēru)
An obnoxiously loud and arrogant representative. Nobtail likes to play dirty. Prior to Tube's pre-World Cup match against the U.S., he and another representative attempted to trap the U.S. team in the shower room by tying up their door in hopes of getting the team disqualified from the main tournament, as tardiness to a pre-World Cup match meant instant disqualification. On the court, he frequently goes out of his way to insult and taunt his opponents. While not a subpar player, Ryoma easily overwhelms him after the team arrives.

== Others ==
Nanjiro Echizen (越前 南次郎, Echizen Nanjirō)
Voiced by: Takashi Matsuyama (Japanese); Liam O'Brien (Viz Media dub), David Wald (Funimation dub) (English)
Nanjiro is the father of Ryoma. Nanjiro is very outspoken, eccentric, a shameless flirt, brash, perverted, and almost childish at times. He is known as "Samurai Nanjiro" for his invincible tennis skills during his earlier years as a professional tennis player. He was trained by Ryuzaki during middle school and eventually became a professional after leaving Japan. He remains undefeated and was only one opponent away to earning a Grand Slam title before he unexpectedly decided to retire in order to teach Ryoma tennis, as he was never interested in becoming the world's best, but rather just wanted a match that pushed him to his limits. In the animated film The Prince of Tennis: Futari no Samurai, it was revealed that he had briefly taken in a child named Ryoga Echizen. In addition to being one of the few players to ever achieve the "Pinnacle of Perfection", Nanjiro sports a tennis style that uses the "Nitoryuu" position of playing ambidextrously, and he uses Samurai Zone to cause all of his opponents shots to return straight to him. He is portrayed by Yukio Ueshima in the first musical, Shinnosuke Motoyama in the second season, and Goro Kishitani in the live-action film.

Sakuno Ryuzaki (竜崎 桜乃, Ryūzaki Sakuno)
Voiced by: Mikako Takahashi (Japanese); Cindy Robinson (Viz Media dub), Xanthe Huynh (Funimation dub) (English)
Sakuno is the granddaughter of Sumire. She is a kind, introverted girl with very long hair kept in twin French braids, and often worries about Ryoma and the others. She starts playing tennis after watching Ryoma and helps support the Seigaku team. Sakuno is attracted towards Ryoma and has feelings for him, but she has trouble opening up to him due to her own shy nature, a degree of bad luck, Ryoma's density and the meddling of the other Seigaku regulars, namely Momoshiro and Eiji. Out of all the girls in the story, she is the only one whom Ryoma shows his kinder side, implying that Ryoma may actually have feelings for her. A running gag in the series is that she often gives wrong directions to others, or otherwise gets lost herself.

Tomoka Osakada (小坂田 朋香, Osakada Tomoka)
Voiced by: Fuyuka Oura (Japanese); Stephanie Sheh (Viz Media dub), Sarah Wiedenheft (Funimation dub) (English)
Tomoka Osakada is Sakuno's best friend and classmate; she supports Ryoma along with Sakuno at the team's matches. Tomoka is very attracted to Ryoma, and she is very open about this compared to Sakuno as the former is very confident and brash, making her a clear extrovert contrasting Sakuno's introversion. Despite her obvious crush on Ryoma, she has no qualms with Sakuno having feelings for him, though she does become extremely passive-aggressive when other girls approach him. She also can be seen arguing with Horio at times and also has several younger siblings, which causes her to miss some of Ryoma's matches through baby-sitting.

Satoshi Horio (堀尾 聡史, Horio Satoshi)
Voiced by: Shigenori Yamazaki (Japanese); Adam Lawson (Viz Media dub), Kylen Deporter (Funimation dub) (English)
Satoshi is a first year student, who claims to know everything about tennis. He constantly brags about his "two years of tennis experience" when he is, in fact, a subpar player. He serves as a gateway character, often explaining or trying to explain tennis terms, rules, and techniques to the other characters. He has an older cousin named Junpei, who has "two years of biking experience" and helps Kintarō Tooyama from Shitenhōji to reach Tokyo. He is portrayed by Yusuke Ishibashi, Masaki Hara, Ryo Yamada, Shun Maruyama, Kento Masui, Yoshito Iwa, Seiya Shimo, Shinta Soma, Ryuga, and Ryota in the musicals.

Kachiro Kato (加藤 勝郎, Katō Kachirō)
Voiced by: Akira Nakagawa (Japanese); Wendee Lee (Viz Media dub), Anne Yatco (Funimation dub) (English)
Kachiro hangs around a lot with Satoshi Horio and Katsuo Mizuno. Although he is not very good at tennis, he thoroughly supports the team. He has a father who coaches at an expensive tennis club. Though he is normally polite and meek, Kachiro believes strongly in justice and fights to the end to defend his beliefs. He is portrayed by Toshiyuki Toyonaga, Yuya Mori, Ryou Kawamoto, Tsubasa Ito, Hiroki Hirai, Shunya Ōhira, Ryo Mitsui, Ryu Shinohara, Nagato Okui, Toshiki Nakamigawa, Kotobuki Shiraishi, and Sena Totsuka in the musicals.

Katsuo Mizuno (水野 カツオ, Mizuno Katsuo)
Voiced by: Kei Watanabe (Japanese); Yuri Lowenthal (Viz Media dub), Bryson Baugus (Funimation dub) (English)
Katsuo Mizuno is the third of the "freshman three" with Satoshi Horio and Kachiro Kato. He bears a strong resemblance to Oishi, which is used to stall for time while Oishi is not present. He is portrayed by Masaru Hotta, Yuki Okamoto, Kouichi Eguchi, Masashi Watanabe, Rio Takahashi, Mizuki Ohno, Mizuki Kobayashi, Arata Sarashina, Shion Hatakeyama, Yumeto Okuda, and Manato Ichikawa in the musicals.

Masashi Arai (荒井 将史, Arai Masashi)
Voiced by: Norihisa Mori (Japanese); Liam O'Brien (English)
Masashi is a second year student and the best reserve player on the team, who is the closest to becoming a regular, almost getting a shot to play in Kantō Tournament finals in the anime when Momoshiro and Kaido were nowhere to be seen. He is known for his hotheadedness and hazing of weaker players, which stem from his hidden, but inflated, ego. He is as hard on himself as he is on the others during training. Although he had a very bitter relationship with Ryoma at first, but eventually learns to respect him. He takes charge of the tennis club when the regulars and the coach are away. However, his ego balloons during this time as no one is around to keep his attitude in check. He often hangs around Masaya Ikeda (池田 雅也, Ikeda Masaya) and Daisuke Hayashi (林 大介, Hayashi Daisuke). He is portrayed by Jiro Morikawa in the musicals.

Mamoru Inoue (井上 守, Inoue Mamoru)
Voiced by: Hozumi Gōda (Japanese); Jack Bauer (Viz Media dub), Jim Foronda (Funimation dub) (English)
Mamoru is a journalist for the Monthly Tennis Pro magazine. Inoue takes a special interest in the progress of Seigaku, especially Ryoma after observing his skill for the first time. He is also an amateur tennis player, as well as being a big fan of Nanjiro Echizen. He is portrayed by Takashi Kitadai in the musicals.

Saori Shiba (芝砂 織, Shiba Saori)
Voiced by: Noriko Namiki (Japanese); Wendee Lee (Viz Media dub), Jennifer Losi (Funimation dub) (English)
Saori is the new photographer for the Monthly Tennis Pro magazine. Along with Inoue, she takes a special interest in Seigaku. Unlike her more professional co-worker, she often lets her emotions get in the way of her job, and is sometimes depicted as a klutz.

Nanako Echizen (越前 菜々子, Echizen Nanako)
Voiced by: Risa Mizuno (Japanese); Stephanie Sheh (English)
Nanako is Ryoma's cousin; she is a student at a local Tokyo college, who currently lives with her relatives, the Echizen family. She plays the role of an elder sibling figure to Ryoma, who is an only child and helps him and the other Echizens with their daily lives. She is sweet-tempered, very polite, loyal, and devoted. In the one-off story "The Prince of Tennis" (which was later re-worked into the actual opening story of the manga), she was "Nanako Ryuzaki", who is given tennis tips by Ryoma and later hit on by club coach Sasabe, whom Ryoma humiliates in retaliation for his dirty playing.

Rinko Echizen (越前 りんこ, Echizen Rinko)
Voiced by: Yuki Nakao (episode 5), Junko Minagawa (episode 129)
Rinko is Ryoma's mother and Nanjiro's wife. Her maiden name is Rinko Takeuchi. She is sweet and compliant, but quite strong-willed as well. She works as an attorney, which has been her long-time dream. She met Nanjiro in America while playing tennis (Nanjiro, who had just begun to make a name for himself in America, didn't consider her very feminine, as she was wearing sweats at the time). When she got hurt from saving a boy from an abusive tennis coach, Nanjiro avenged her by completely humiliating the coach in a match.

Sasabe (笹部)
Voiced by: Yoshiaki Matsumoto (Japanese); David Lodge (English)
Sasabe is a local bully, who occasionally encounters Ryoma and his friends. He is first introduced when he boasts about his knowledge of the different types of tennis grip, which is when Ryoma corrects his knowledge. He is also the first person in the series to play a match against Ryoma, whom he loses to. His father, who has an attitude similar to his son, also encounters Ryoma and his friends on a few occasions. In the one-off story "The Prince of Tennis" (which was later re-worked into the actual opening story of the manga), he is the coach at a tennis club who tries to hit on "Nanako Ryuzaki" and is humiliated by Ryoma in retaliation for his dirty playing. He is portrayed by Katsuo in the first musical.

Miyuki Chitose (みゆき千歳, Chitose Miyuki)
Voiced by: Rina Satō
Miyuki is Senri's eight-year-old little sister and the one who helped Tezuka make it in time for the nationals after he injuries his shoulder after a match with Keigo Atobe in the first round of the Kanto Tournament and has no choice to go to Kyushu for rehabilitation. They meet after Tezuka accidentally started using her racket to practice hitting in his training. Since then, Miyuki started calling him "Racket Thief" or "Mister Thief". She became his little coach and after her Yips (a medical condition where the body's muscles stiffen because of nervousness) kicked in during a match, Tezuka told her how the only way to get over it is to train and build confidence. A tennis team then walked in and told Tezuka about how Seishun won the Kanto Tournament without him. Tezuka then starting playing tennis with one of the team members, but lost because he now has a fear of lifting his shoulder. Miyuki then decided to play against the team. Amazingly, she does not give up, and her Yips do not occur. This made Tezuka see that the reason he cannot lift his arm is because of what happened, so after Miyuki trips he hits the ball back and takes her place. Tezuka wins against the team, and Senri checks up on him during the matches. Tezuka realizes he can make it back in time. A few days later, Miyuki was able to become champion of a tennis tournament and went to show her new medal to Tezuka, but he had already left. Miyuki reappears in Another Story (OVA 1) after seeing Tezuka in a book store.

Liliadent Krauser (リリアデント・クラウザー（蔵兎座）, Ririadento Kurauzā)
Voiced by: Tetsuya Kakihara
Liliadent is one of the seven foreign students gathered for the national conventions. He appears only in The Prince of Tennis OVAs (debut appearance in OVA Semifinal Vol. 3-Episode 6) and then reappears in The Prince of Tennis II. Unlike his teammates, he had decided to stay in Japan in order to continue challenging the players that had defeated him at the National tournament semifinals, and joins the other middle schoolers at the All-Japan U-17 camp. His tennis style is "Dismissal by Crucifixion" where, after some set-up "hopping ball" shots, he hits a single powerful shot "Southern Cross" that vibrates in the shape of a cross and nails the opponent to the back wall or fence, forcing his opponents to retire. He's noted to have below average stamina because of his play style. He is portrayed by David Shintani in the musicals.

== Reception ==
Shusuke Fuji
Fuji has remained in the top two of all the Shonen Jump character popularity polls for the series. He was number one in the second character popularity poll, and second place in every other poll.
Fuji has constantly been in the top three recipients of chocolate in the Valentine Chocolate specials of the manga, receiving the most in 2001.
Sadaharu Inui
In each of the official character popularity polls for the series run in Weekly Shōnen Jump, Inui has appeared in the Top 10, with his rank steadily increasing. In the first two polls he came in 10th place, and he increased to 6th place in the third poll. In the fourth poll, Inui made it into the Top 5 for the first time, appearing in fifth place.
Kaoru Kaido
Kaido has been placed on every single popularity poll taken for The Prince of Tennis. In the first poll taken, he came in 6th place, and moved up to 5th place in the second poll. He fell to 18th in the third poll, and moved up slightly to 17th in the fourth poll.
Anime on DVD praised Kaido for being unpredictable and borderline psychotic.
Keigo Atobe
Since Keigo Atobe's initial appearance, he has become one of the most popular characters in The Prince of Tennis series. In the 2006 Valentine Special, Atobe was the winner, receiving over 1000 chocolates. In the third character popularity ranking, he came in third place, behind only Ryoma and Fuji. In the 4th characters' popularity ranking, Atobe was voted first with a total of 12,913 votes, soundly beating Shusuke Fuji, who came in second with 6116 votes.
Atobe was also the first character to sing "Valentine Kiss" in 2004. Since then, the same song was released annually at Valentine's Day by different characters and featuring harmony by two other characters. In 2005 it was sung by Yuushi Oshitari, and by Ryo Shishido in 2006, all of whom are Hyotei Gakuen players. In 2007, it was sung by Genichirou Sanada of Rikkai Dai, thus ending the Hyotei successions. The song appears for the second time in 2007 as a bonus track in the album of Shuichiro Oishi. In 2008, it was sung by Yuujirou Kai of Higa Middle School. Shiraishi Kuranosuke of Shitenhoji sang it in 2009 and was sung by Nio Masaharu of Rikkaidai and Hiyoshi Wakashi of Hyotei in 2010. In 2011, it was sung by Fukushi Michiru of Ginka and Ohtori Chohtaroh of Hyotei. In 2012, it was sung by Eishiro Kite, captain of Higa.

== Merchandise ==
Keigo Atobe
Atobe has released more character CDs than any other character in the series besides Ryoma, including two full-length albums. One of his singles reached top nine in the weekly charts, the best result for any Prince of Tennis character. Figures of Atobe have also been released.
