= Yoshikazu Kotani =

Japanese actor and singer

- 小谷嘉一
- Born: March 25, 1982 (age 43); Tokyo, Japan
- Occupations: Actor; Singer
- Years active: 2001–present
- Spouse: Risa Niigaki (m. 2016; div. 2018)
- Website: Kotani's official website

Yoshikazu Kotani (小谷 嘉一, Kotani Yoshikazu) (born March 25, 1982) is a Japanese actor and singer. He played Takashi Kawamura in The Prince of Tennis musical series, Tenimyu and the live film adaptation.

== Career ==
Kotani played a transvestite in TKO Hip Hop.

Kotani portrayed Takashi Kawamura, the soft-spoken, dual-personality 3rd year regular of Seigaku Middle School's tennis club, in The Prince of Tennis musicals, Tenimyu. From 2005 to 2006, he was the fourth actor to play Kawamura as a member of the second-generation Seigaku cast. He made his debut as Kawamura on January 8, 2005 in the Side Yamabuki performance in Osaka. That same year, his role as Kawamura carried into the live adaptation film of the manga.

On March 29, 2006, in the Dream Live 3rd Live concert, Kotani, along with the majority of the Seigaku cast, graduated from their roles.

Kotani carried his role from the musicals to the live-adaptation film of The Prince of Tennis. He reprised his role in the movie. The Prince of Tennis was released on May 13, 2006 and opened in the tenth spot of the Japanese box office.

Kotani starred in the made-for DVD release tokusatsu series, ZanSaber, as a tokusatsu hero. ZanSaber was released on November 18, 2006.

Kotani's next project was filming for the made-for DVD release movie, Boys Love, which co-starred Takumi Saito. Kotani plays Mamiya Taishin, a magazine editor who meets high-school model, Kisaragi Noeru (Takumi), during a magazine interview. Boys Love was released on November 24, 2006.

In 2007, Kotani took the lead in the theatrical edition of Boys Love, which shared only its title with the 2006 movie, and featured a new story and cast. Kotani portrayed Aoi Kairu, a young teacher at an all-boys boarding school, who discovers that his new student, Sora Amakami (Atsumi Kanno) is the boy with whom he recently had a sexual encounter. The movie costarred Yuuki Kawakubo and, in smaller roles, Toru Baba and Renn Kiriyama.

In 2007, Kotani appeared in the film, Arakure KNIGHT (荒くれＫＮＩＧＨＴ), the live-action adaptation of the 1982 to 1988 manga series, Aratanaru Shobaku by Satosi Yoshida. The film was released in April 2007. Kotani acted alongside Yuu Shirota, Masaki Kaji, Kousuke Kujirai and Kenta Kamakari.

Kotani is a member of +Plus, a J-pop band that does opening and ending songs for anime. Their latest anime was Hitman REBORN. +PLUS released four albums.

== Personal life ==
Kotani began dating former Morning Musume member Risa Niigaki after they starred in the stage play Absolute Boyfriend in 2013. After two years of dating, they married on July 11, 2016. On January 6, 2018, their blogs announced that they were filing for divorce.

== Discography ==
2007 – "Going to the Road" was his first solo single, that also included "Irotodori no Sekai".

== Filmography ==
Year	Title	Role	Other notes
2001	As for Looking at Love Lastly	Kunihiko	TV drama
2001	Kamen Rider Agito	Kouji Majima	Tokusatsu
2004	Waltz of the Puppy	Wada Takashi	TV drama special
2004	Take Off!	N/A	TV drama
2004	Division 1 (After the Releasing Section)	Mizutani	TV drama
2004	Genseishin Justirisers	Takeda	Tokusatsu
2005	Mata no hi no chika (Another Day for Chika) or (Days of Chika)	Kondo Yukitugu	
2005	Ruri no Shima	N/A	
2005	Dangerous Related	Sakura Yoshihiko	TV drama special
2005	Justirisers	Takeda	TV drama special
2005	Anego	N/A	TV drama
2005	Kosume no Mahou 2	Kobayashi	TV drama
2005	Gakkou no Kaidan	N/A	Net Drama
2005	TKO Hip Hop	Cindy	
2005	Chikan Otoko	N/A	
2006	The Prince of Tennis	Takashi Kawamura	
2006	Shinrei Shashin Kitan (心霊写真奇譚)	Nishimura Hiroshi	Appears in Hishatai no Nai Shashin, story No. 1
2006	ZanSaber	N/A	
2006	Yuuki	N/A	
2006	Boys Love	Mamiya Taishin	
2007	Arakure KNIGHT	N/A	post-production (film)
2007	Beauty Boys Celebrity	Go	TV drama
2007	Boys Love (theater edition)	Aoi Kairu	
2008	Biyou Shounen Sereburiti		
2009	Tokyo Ghost Trip	Episode 1.6	
2009	Teioh		
2015	Messiah: Eisei no Fumi		TV drama
2015	Flowers for Algernon	Episode 1	TV drama
2015	Docchi Mo Docchi	Tsuburaya	movie
2015	Messiah Project		movie

=== Theatre ===
- 2003 – 年秋公演「ANGEL29X99」にて客演ANGEL

=== Musicals ===
TENIMYU: THE PRINCE OF TENNIS MUSICAL SERIES (as Takashi Kawamura)

- The Prince of Tennis Musical: Side Yamabuki feat. St. Rudolph (In Winter of 2004–2005)
- The Prince of Tennis Musical: Dream Live 2nd (2005)
- The Prince of Tennis Musical: The Imperial Match Hyotei Gakuen (2005)
- The Prince of Tennis Musical: The Imperial Match Hyotei Gakuen in Winter (In Winter of 2005–2006)
- The Prince of Tennis Musical: Dream Live 3rd (2006)

== Awards ==
1999 JUNON SUPER BOY Contest – 5th Place

== See also ==
- Tenimyu
- The Prince of Tennis Movie
- The Prince of Tennis
- Takashi Kawamura (The Prince of Tennis)
- Plus (band)
