= Eiji Moriyama =

Japanese stage actor and voice actor (born 1976)

- 森山 栄治
- Born: October 3, 1976 (age 49); Nagasaki Prefecture, Japan
- Occupations: Actor, voice actor
- Years active: 2000-present
- Agent: Sun Music Group
- Height: 177 cm (5 ft 10 in)
- Website: Official profile

Eiji Moriyama (森山 栄治, Moriyama Eiji) is a Japanese stage actor and voice actor who is best known for his stage works, such as originating Takeshi Momoshiro of the first generation Seigaku cast of The Prince of Tennis musical series (commonly called Tenimyu), and as Renji Abarai in Rock Musical BLEACH series. He is currently employed by Sun Music Group and is also a member of the entertainment group *pnish*.

Moriyama would reprise his role as Momoshiro and reunited with the majority first Seigaku cast to perform in Tenimyu's Dream Live 7th concert to celebrate the end of the series' first season. He would return to Tenimyu years later to play the role of Nanjiro Echizen for their second and third seasons.

== Acting Roles ==
=== Theatre ===
TENIMYU: THE PRINCE OF TENNIS MUSICAL SERIES (as Takeshi Momoshiro)

- The Prince of Tennis Musical (2003)
- The Prince of Tennis Musical: Remarkable 1st Match Fudomine (2003–2004)
- The Prince of Tennis Musical: Dream Live 1st (2004)
- The Prince of Tennis Musical: More Than Limit St. Rudolph Gakuen (2004)
- The Prince of Tennis Musical: Side Fudomine ~Special Match~ (In Winter of 2004–2005)
- The Prince of Tennis Musical: Dream Live 7th (2010)

Rock Musicals BLEACH (as Renji Abarai)

- Rock Musical Bleach (2005)
- Rock Musical Bleach: Saien (2006)
- Rock Musical Bleach: The Dark of the Bleeding Moon (2006)
- Rock Musical Bleach: Live Bankai Show Code 001 (2007)
- Rock Musical Bleach: No Clouds in the Blue Heavens (2007)
- Rock Musical Bleach: The All (2008)
- Rock Musical Bleach: Live Bankai Show Code 002 (2008)
- Rock Musical Bleach: Live Bankai Show Code 003 (2010)

Other

- Various Shiro x Kuro productions, as a member
- Various *pnish* productions, as a member and producer
- Waga Machi
- Towering Life
- Comic Jack as Rascal
- OH! BABY as Eiji Sawamura
- Moeyo Ken
- Hallelujah as Eiji
- ZIPPER
- Angela
- Jump Festa Stage One Piece as Roronoa Zoro
- Ending Note: Yuruka na Zetsubou
- bambino
- Den'en no Shisu
- 30
- bambino 2
- Sukedachi
- abbey
- bambino+
- Shin Ugetsu Monogatari
- 31
- bambino 0
- Every Little Thing
- Samurai 7
- Persona 5 on Stage - Sojiro Sakura

=== Cinema ===
- The Prince of Tennis (film) (2006) as Genichirou Sanada (cameo)
- Waterboys (2001) as captain of the basketball team

== Voice Acting ==
=== Anime ===
- Dr. Rin ni Kiitemite! (TV) as Kanzaki Koumi
- Eyeshield 21 (TV) as Kotaro Sasaki
- Good Morning Call (OAV) as Uehara Hisashi
- The Prince of Tennis (series & OVAs) as Ibu Shinji
- The Prince of Tennis: Atobe's Gift (movie) as Ibu Shinji

=== Game ===
- GetBackers: Dakkanya as Midou Ban
- The Prince of Tennis series as Ibu Shinji
- The Prince of Tennis: SWEAT&TEARS as Toudou Kengo, Ibu Shinji
