= The Prince of Tennis (seasons 1 and 2) =

Japanese anime series seasons

Cover of the first DVD box set released by Viz Media.

The episodes covering the first two seasons of The Prince of Tennis anime series were directed by Takayuki Hamana, animated by Trans Arts, and co-produced by Nihon Ad Systems, J.C.Staff, and Production I.G. It originally aired on the terrestrial Japanese network TV Tokyo from October 2001 to October 2002. The anime is an adaptation of Takeshi Konomi's Prince of Tennis manga series created in 2000, and the story revolves around a 12-year-old tennis prodigy named Ryoma Echizen, who moves back to his native Japan in order to attend his father's alma mater, Seishun Academy, a private middle school famous for its strong tennis team.

Viz Media handles the distribution of the series in North America, where the episodes debuted as streaming media on Viz's and Cartoon Network's joint online broadband service called Toonami Jetstream on July 14, 2006. It first began airing on North American television as part of Toonami's Saturday programming block on December 23, 2006. However, it was removed from Toonami's schedule on June 9, 2007, and was also removed from Toonami Jetstream after episode fifty's broadcast on December 3, 2007. As of January 15, 2008, a total of four DVD compilations, containing the first fifty episodes of the two seasons, have been released by Viz Media. All four compilations contain three discs, each containing four episodes, save the final discs of the first two compilations, which contain five episodes.

Five pieces of theme music are used for the Japanese language episodes; two opening themes and three ending themes. The two opening themes, "Future", used for the first season, and "Driving Myself", used for the second, are both performed by Hiro-X. The first ending theme, "You Got Game" by Kimeru, is used for the first season. For the second season, there are two ending themes which periodically alternates, "Keep your style" and "Walk On", both performed by Masataka Fujishige. In the English language episodes, the opening and ending themes were replaced with electronic music compositions.

== Episode list ==
=== Season 1 ===
==== Intraschool Rankings Saga – Part I (Eps. 1–10) ====
No.	Title	Original release date	English airdate
1	"A Prince Appears" "Ōjisama Arawaru" (王子様現る)	October 10, 2001	July 14, 2006; Toonami Jetstream premiere
At the request of his father, Ryoma Echizen moves back to Japan after having success at tennis in the United States, having won four consecutive American Junior Openings. On his way to a Japanese tennis tournament, he "saves" Sakuno Ryuzaki from some thugs like an absolute pro. However due to this, he misses the tournament, however, he finds an opponent in the form of one of the thugs he met on the subway. He then puts his opponent, Sasabe, in his place during the match, where he reveals his exceptional tennis capabilities.
2	"Samurai Junior" "Samurai Junia" (サムライ·ジュニア)	October 17, 2001	July 24, 2006
Upon his arrival in Seishun Academy, "Seigaku" for short, Ryoma teaches a lesson to two juniors who are picking on the freshmen. Takeshi Momoshiro, one of the team's regulars, puts a stop to it and decides to play Ryoma in a tennis match. Noticing that Momoshiro has a bad ankle, Ryoma decides not to play with his dominant hand. Also, Sakuno's energetic friend, Tomoka, is introduced to Ryoma, and instantly proclaims herself to be his number one fan.
3	"The Seigaku Regulars Make Their Debut!" "They've Arrived! The Seigaku Regulars // Tōjō! Seigaku Regurā" (登場!青学レギュラー)	October 24, 2001	July 31, 2006
The Seigaku regulars are introduced, while a journalist, Mamoru Inoue, and a photographer, Saori Shiba, visit Seigaku in order to report on the team's upcoming ranking matches. Meanwhile, Ryoma defeats a second year non-regular, Arai, using an old broken tennis racket when the latter hides all three of Ryoma's rackets. Seeing his skill, the captain of the tennis team, Kunimitsu Tezuka, enters Ryoma's name on the roster for the intraschool ranking matches despite the fact that he is a freshman.
4	"The One Named Viper" "The Man Called Viper // Mamushi to Yobareru Otoko" (マムシと呼ばれる男)	October 31, 2001	August 7, 2006
The Seigaku ranking matches has begun, and Ryoma and the Seigaku regulars continue to win their matches early on in the tournament. Ryoma then gets pitted against regular Kaoru Kaido in the third round, where the latter reveals his special move, the Snake Shot. This throws Ryoma off guard, so he decides to switch to his dominant hand.
5	"Snake Shot" "Suneiku Shotto" (スネイク·ショット)	November 7, 2001	August 14, 2006
Kaido attempts to use his Snake shot to wear off Ryoma's stamina, and though Ryoma initially shows signs of sweating and fatigue, he surprises both Kaido and the spectators when his speed and power does not decrease. Near the end, it is revealed that Ryoma had been implementing a plan: he had been specifically hitting shots that Kaido had to bend his knees in order to return, thus Kaido would lose stamina far faster than Ryoma. His plan works, earning him the win.
6	"Nanjiro Echizen" "That Man, Echizen Nanjirō // Sono Otoko, Echizen Nanjirō" (その男, 越前南次郎)	November 14, 2001	August 21, 2006
Inoue plays a match with Nanjiro Echizen, the former "Samurai Nanjiro", a legendary tennis professional, to get answers about why he retired. Though Nanjiro appears to not be taking it seriously, his skills show otherwise, and he easily beats Inoue with both his eyes closed. However, Inoue finds out that Nanjiro is now focusing on developing the skills of his son, Ryoma. Meanwhile, Sakuno looks for Ryoma to learn more about him and tennis.
7	"The Two Ryomas" "Futari no Ryōma" (二人のリョーマ)	November 21, 2001	September 5, 2006
In Ryoma's next ranking match, he plays against Inui Sadaharu, who uses Data Tennis to counter Ryoma's play style. Using the data he gathered from Ryoma's previous match, Inui is able to dominate the match by accurately predicting and countering Ryoma's moves. Though irritated, Ryoma refuses to give up and reveals that he is glad to have transferred into Seigaku because he can now play against different types of players, like Inui.
8	"The Split Step" "Supurittosuteppu" (スプリットステップ)	November 28, 2001	September 18, 2006
In order to counter Inui's data, Ryoma uses a new technique he had practiced when playing against his father, the One-footed Split Step. This requires him to continuously hop in place so he can react faster to the ball, as well as be able to move to another part of the court more quickly. Using this technique, Ryoma gains enough agility and speed to return Inui's calculated shots. This, along with the Twist Serve, surpasses Inui's data and turns the game into Ryoma's favor.
9	"The Hard Day" "Za Hādo Dei" (ザ·ハード·デイ)	December 5, 2001	October 2, 2006
Inui continues to be unable to return Ryoma's Twist Serve, resulting in his eventual loss. Ryoma then wins his next games, and finally becomes a regular. Meanwhile, Inui plays against his next opponent, Kaido, who also surpasses Inui's data and takes a spot in the regulars as well. With eight spots taken, Inui loses his place as a regular, however, Seigaku's coach, Sumire Ryuzaki, asks him to help in the regulars' training instead. During training, he introduces his special and dreaded vegetable juice, which most of the regulars fall victim to.
10	"Counterattack! Sasabe Again?" "Counter Attack! Sasabe Once Again // Gyakushuu! Sasabe Futatabi" (逆襲!佐々部再び)	December 12, 2001	October 16, 2006
Ryoma and the rest of the freshmen go to where Kachiro's father works as a tennis coach. However, they find trouble with Sasabe again, but this time, Sasabe's father is the bigger problem. In order to teach him a lesson, Ryoma asks the father to teach him tennis. Though Sasabe warns his father not to, the latter is more than willing to do so. In their practice match, the father ends up pulling a muscle after Ryoma shows him just how much he should have listened to Kachiro's father's advice about warming up first.

==== Tokyo Preliminaries Saga – Part I: Fudomine Jr. High (Eps. 11–20) ====
No.	Title	Original release date	English airdate
11	"Ryoma vs. Momoshiro" "Echizen VS Momoshiro" (越前VS桃城)	December 19, 2001	October 23, 2006
Realizing that the only remaining singles slot left is singles 3, Ryoma and Momoshiro compete for it when they both want to play singles in the upcoming match against Gyokurin Middle School. However, when they decide to settle it with a match, they end up playing doubles against locals instead. Though they defeat their first few challengers, they are utterly defeated by two cocky Gyokurin players due to their lack of teamwork. It is then that the two decide to play doubles in the upcoming match.
12	"The Perfect Match" "The Two "AH UN" Boys // A Un na Futari" (ア·ウンな二人)	December 26, 2001	October 30, 2006
Momoshiro and Ryoma volunteer to play in doubles 2, and develop a tactic to improve their playing coordination. However, despite their practice, they continue to clash with each other due to their natural dominant tendencies as singles players. In addition, their rivals use a strategy which takes advantage of Momoshiro and Ryoma's lack of coordination, turning the game into their favor.
13	"Real Men Play Doubles" "Men Play Doubles // Otoko wa Doburusu" (男はダブルス!)	January 9, 2002	November 6, 2006
With their new strategy, Gyokurin continues to dominate. Irritated, Ryoma and Momoshiro realize that they are truly not suited to be doubles players, and agree to split the court in half. Now they each only have to defend one half of the court and is able to utilize their individual skills. Though strange, it is an effective strategy that wins them the game. However, due to their shameful performance, they still receive punishment from their coach.
14	"The Triple Counter" "The Swallow Return! // Tsubame Gaeshi!" (つばめ返し!)	January 16, 2002	November 13, 2006
Fudomine Middle School, an unknown team that withdrew from last tournament for internal affairs, is Seigaku's next rival. In the first game, Seigaku's Shusuke Fuji and Takashi Kawamura find themselves struggling against the first Fudomine pair, forcing Fuji to use one of his Triple Counters, Tsubame Gaeshi, a technique that causes the ball to roll rather than bounce once it reaches the opponents' side of the court.
15	"To Each His Own Battle" "Their Respective Fights // Sorezore no Tatakai" (それぞれの戦い)	January 23, 2002	November 20, 2006
Determined to overcome Fuji's skills, Fudomine's Tetsu Ishida tries a desperate measure to seal Fuji's Tsubame Gaeshi by using a hit of considerable strength called Hadokyu. When he aims it directly toward Fuji, Kawamura decides to get in its way when he realizes that Fuji would not be able to return it. Hoverer, though he succeeds in returning it, he hurts his wrist in the process, forcing Seigaku to forfeit the match.
16	"The Boomerang Snake" "Būmeran Suneiku" (ブーメラン·スネイク)	January 30, 2002	November 27, 2006
Thanks to Eiji Kikumaru's acrobatics and Shuichiro Oishi's ability to adapt to his partner's style, Seigaku's "Golden Pair" wins their doubles match easily. Next is the game between Kaido and Kamio Akira, where Kaoru's Snake shot turns out to be ineffective against the speed ace from Fudomine. In a moment of desperation, Kaido inadvertently performs a near impossible shot around the net's pole, which is then dubbed the Boomerang Snake.
17	"A Little Gesture of Triumph" "The Small Winning Pose // Chiisana Gattsupōzu" (小さなガッツポーズ)	February 6, 2002	December 4, 2006
Kaido desperately tries to recreate the Boomerang Snake, but he eventually stops his attempts when he decides to just play his style of tennis. With neither side yielding, Kamio's and Kaido's game becomes an endurance match. However, in the end, Kaido's willpower and persistence outlasts Kamio's stamina. Also, Momoshiro learns the identity of the girl he has been recently running into, who turns out to be Fudomine's player-coach and Kippei Tachibana's younger sister, An Tachibana.
18	"The Love Letter" "Raburetā" (ラブレター)	February 13, 2002	December 11, 2006
Tezuka found out Nanjiro is Ryoma's father. Nanjiro Echizen finds a letter from Ryuzaki and remembers the days when he trained under her as a Seigaku regular. Meanwhile, Ryoma's opponent, Shinji Ibu, shows his skills when he is able to return Ryoma's Twist Serve, as well as his revealing his own serve, the Kick Serve, which is similar to the Twist Serve. Ryoma then switches to his left hand, and the game heats up between the two player's serves.
19	"Battle-Scarred Ryoma" "Ryoma is Injured // Kizudarake no Ryoma" (傷だらけのリョーマ)	February 20, 2002	December 18, 2006
Ryoma struggles to resist Ibu's "spot", a technique where Ibu forces Ryoma to hit certain shots that temporarily paralyzes his arm. However, when Ryoma tries to spin his body instead of moving his arm the racket gets loose from his grip and it bounces back, hitting his eye. With his eyelid bleeding, it seems impossible for him to continue, but he insists on continuing the match.
20	"Time Limit" "Taimurimitto" (タイムリミット)	February 27, 2002	December 26, 2006
Impressed with his determination, Tezuka gives Ryoma ten minutes to finish the game, after which he will forfeit the match. In the end, Ryoma manages to overcome Ibu's "spot" and wins the match right before his allotted time had ended. With Ryoma's win, Seigaku wins the tournament, and after tending to his wounds, the Seigaku regulars celebrate in Kawamura's sushi restaurant.

==== Seigaku's Training Saga – Part I (Eps. 21–26) ====
No.	Title	Original release date	English airdate
21	"Is the Tennis Court Burning Up?" "Tenisukōto wa Moeteiruka?" (テニスコートは燃えているか?)	March 3, 2002	January 2, 2007
Due to their recent victories, spies from other schools begin to observe Seigaku's training. When they catch two of the spies spying on them even after school hours, Momoshiro and Ryoma teach the two of them a lesson in a doubles match. When the two spies are only able to score one point against them, they decide to practice their tennis, instead of spying on others.
22	"Kaoru's Troubles" "Kaoru no Sainan" (薫の災難)	March 13, 2002	January 16, 2007
While Kaido starts his daily training, Momoshiro and Kamio Akira end up playing a doubles match against two Hyotei regulars, Atobe Keigo and Munehiro Kabaji, when the latter two pick on An Tachibana. Meanwhile, Ryoma and Shinji Ibu battle over grip tape by creating a contest in which they catch a pickpocket. Kaido is then unwittingly dragged into the mess when he is suspected of being the thief.
23	"Here Comes Inui's Deluxe Drink!" "Appeared! Inui's Juice Deluxe // Tōjyō! Inui Jiru Derakkusu" (登場!乾汁デラックス)	March 20, 2002	January 29, 2007
During their new training regimen, Kaido and Oishi are forced to drink Inui's special vegetable juice for losing in their training match, becoming very sick. Then, when Tezuka accidentally drinks all of Inui's juice, Inui is forced to use his "Golden Power Remix Inui Juice" on the loser of the Kikumaru and Ryoma match. When Ryoma fails to win the game within five shots, which was the requirement for him to win, he ends being the one to drink it.
24	"Ryoma's Day Off" "Ryoma's Holiday // Ryōma no Kyuujitsu" (リョーマの休日)	March 27, 2002	February 12, 2007
Ryoma is asked by coach Ryuzaki to go to the racket-stringer with Sakuno, whom he constantly ignores, though unknowingly. Curious what Ryoma is up to, Nanjiro decides to follow him, and after seeing the two together, Momoshiro and the freshman trio, spy on the two, believing that they are on a date. However, Ryoma continues to ignore her and even end up hurting her feelings when she asks about him. In the end, Ryoma tries to make up for it by teaching her some tennis.
25	"Seigaku's Strongest Man, Part 1" "Seigaku Saikyō no Otoko" (青学最強の男)	April 10, 2002	February 26, 2007
Feeling that Ryoma's tennis is a simple copy of his father's, Tezuka asks coach Ryuzaki for permission to play an unofficial match against Ryoma. Before his match, Tezuka and Oishi go to a clinic to check whether or not Tezuka's arm has healed. Though it is healed, the doctor warns him not to play long matches and to not use his drop shot. After finding out he is fine, he meets up with Ryoma. Suspicious of the two's meeting, Oishi decides to follow the pair to see what is really going on.
26	"Seigaku's Strongest Man, Part 2" "Seigaku Saikyō no Otoko" (青学最強の男)	April 10, 2002	March 12, 2007
During their match, in order to convince the latter to aim higher with his own style of tennis, Tezuka risks re-injuring his arm by going all out in the match, resulting in Ryoma's defeat. Oishi, who was the sole spectator of the Tezuka and Ryoma match, talks to Tezuka about the outcome and its repercussions. The next day at school, the other team members, grow suspicious when Tezuka and Ryoma fail to appear during team practice two days in a row. Meanwhile, Ryoma asks Nanjiro for a match, in which the latter realizes that Ryoma has changed and will now get stronger.

=== Season 2 ===
==== Tokyo Metropolitan Tournament Saga – Part II: St. Rudolph Academy (Eps. 27–36) ====
No.	Title	Original release date	English airdate
27	"Kalpin's Adventure" "Karupin's Adventure // Karupin no Bōken" (カルピンの冒険)	April 17, 2002	March 26, 2007
Ryoma accidentally packs his cat's [Karupin] favorite toy in his tennis bag, so Karupin follows him to school and explores the grounds. When Ryoma finds out his cat is on campus, he rushes to find him, worried about what may become of him. After finding out that Ryoma has been relentlessly searching for his cat, the other members help him in his search, eventually helping him find Karupin.
28	"A New Regular Appears!?" "Shin Regyurā Arawaru!?" (新レギュラー現る!?)	April 24, 2002	April 9, 2007
When Ryoma oversleeps before the match, Satoshi Horio, another freshman, is forced to impersonate Ryoma, but he gets challenged by another player when the latter hears him bragging about his supposed skills. Luckily for Horio, Ryoma arrives just in time to bail him out. Meanwhile, Hajime Mizuki, the manager of St. Rudolph's tennis team, tells Akiyama, Seigaku's opponent, how to target the Seigaku players' weak spots.
29	"Momo and Viper" "Momo to Mamushi" (桃とマムシ)	May 1, 2002	April 23, 2007
The next tournament starts, and the Seigaku team is informed of their positions. Momoshiro and Kaido are unexpectedly paired up to play doubles 2 against St. Rudolph's Atsushi Kisarazu and Shinya Yanagisawa even though the two have been rivals since they were freshmen. Ironically, however, though they argue with each other, they appear to be a compatible team, who can play on each other's strengths and weaknesses.
30	"Mizuki's Scenario" "Mizuki no Shinario" (観月のシナリオ)	May 8, 2002	April 30, 2007
Though Momoshiro and Kaido are a compatible team, they constantly butt heads in the court, resulting in them struggling as the opponents also know their strengths and weaknesses as well. However, the last-ditch appearance of Kaido's latest technique, the Boomerang Snake, throws Mizuki's carefully laid plans in disarray since he believed that Kaido was unable to perform the technique at will. This also motivates Momoshiro to evolve as well.
31	"The Moon Volley" "Mūnborē" (ムーンボレー)	May 15, 2002	May 7, 2007
Momoshiro knocks out the St. Rudolph player Yanagisawa when his Dunk Smash accidentally hits the player, thus Seigaku wins doubles 2 by default. Eiji and Oishi, the famed Golden Pair, takes to the courts against St. Rudolph's Ichirou Kaneda and its captain, Yoshirou Akazawa. In the match, Mizuki's information helps the St. Rudolph pair tire out Eiji, which is when Oishi reveals his famed technique, the Moon Volley, which can land directly on the baseline.
32	"Mortal Blow: Eiji's Feigned Sleep Attack" "Super Move! Eiji's Pretend to Sleep Attack!? // Hissatsu! Eiji no Neta Furi Kōgeki!?" (必殺!英二の寝たフリ攻撃!?)	May 22, 2002	May 14, 2007
Oishi and Eiji use a new formation that makes use of their exceptional teamwork, but when Eiji runs out of energy, he resorts to regaining his stamina by standing still on the court. In order to give Eiji time to regain his strength, Oishi plays against both the St. Rudolph players by himself. Just when the other pair was about to win, Eiji recovers at match point and saves the ball just in time, thanking his teammate for covering for him.
33	"The Tiebreak" "Taiburēku" (タイブレーク)	May 29, 2002	May 21, 2007
Eiji recovers, and the "Golden Pair" take it to a tiebreaker. However, just when they have a run of three straight points, Eiji starts to lose his stamina again. St. Rudolph fights back and wins the match, but Akazawa accepts that they were lucky, while Mizuki starts to lose confidence in his data and predictions. In the next match, in which Ryoma is pitted against Yuta Fuji, the latter demonstrates his Twist Spin shot against Ryoma.
34	"Twist Spin Shot" "Tsuisutosupinshotto" (ツイストスピンショット)	June 5, 2002	May 29, 2007
Ryoma faces Yuta Fuji, Shusuke's younger brother and also the one rumored to be the lefty-killer, the player who specializes in defeating left-handed opponents. He quickly runs into trouble due to the opponent's tricky Rising shot, which is able to confuse Ryoma due to the ball's unusual motion, but eventually finds a way to counter it. As the match goes, Yuta's reasons for transferring to St. Rudolph from Seigaku is revealed. To prove his worth, Yuta performs his Twist Spin shot.
35	"Drive B" "Doraibu B" (ドライブB)	June 12, 2002	June 4, 2007
With his Rising shot and Twist Spin shot, Yuta is able to dominate the match, but Ryoma continues to find a way to counter the combination. After he advises Yuta to not use his Twist Spin shot anymore, Ryoma unveils his new move, Drive B, a technique that bounces in a B shape, to counter Yuta's technique. With it, Ryoma is able to win the match. The ruthlessness of Mizuki is revealed as he is shown to be the one who taught Yuta the Twist Spin shot, despite knowing that it can cause major damage to the user's arm.
36	"Big Brother, Shusuke Fuji" "Big Brother, Syusuke Fuji // Ani, Fuji Syusuke" (兄, 不二周助)	June 19, 2002	June 11, 2007
Angered by Mizuki's treatment of his younger brother, Fuji decides to teach him a lesson about tennis on the courts. Though Mizuki is confident in the data he has collected on Fuji, which seemingly goes according to his plan at first, the match ends with his complete defeat; Fuji had lost the first five games on purpose. Meanwhile, Fudomine unexpectedly defeats Hyotei Academy three games to zero.

==== Seigaku's Training Saga – Part II (Eps. 37–40) ====
No.	Title	Original release date	English airdate
37	"A Tennis Ball with Ryoma's Face" "Ryōma Jirushi no Tenisubōru" (リョーマ印のテニスボール)	June 26, 2002	June 18, 2007
Nanjiro tricks Ryoma into teaching Sakuno and Tomoka tennis. While trying to teach the two girls tennis, however, Sakuno accidentally disrupts the practice of a school team. In order to help, Ryoma defeats the entire team, not knowing that they are one of Seigaku's next opponents, Ginka. Unbeknownst to them, Yamabuki's Jin Akutsu, who was planning to beat Ginka himself, is observing the entire event.
38	"Penal-Tea" "Penaru Tii!" (ペナル茶!)	July 3, 2002	June 25, 2007
Akutsu wreaks havoc in Seigaku, attacking Kachiro and Arai. Ryoma intervenes, and when Akutsu throws a rock at him, he is able to hit it back with his racket. However, when Akutsu throws several rocks at him, he gets injured in the process. When the regulars later spot Kawamura and Akutsu having a secret meeting, they are surprised to find that the two have known each other since childhood.
39	"The Brown Bear" "Bear Drop! // Higuma Otoshi!" (ヒグマ落とし!)	July 10, 2002	July 2, 2007
During training, the regulars end up running laps. When Inui announces that the last person to cross the finish line has to drink his new drink. Determined not lose, they all end up finishing at the same time. Later, Ryoma and Fuji face off in a practice match, where the two decide to go all out. During the match, Fuji reveals his second Triple Counter, the Higuma Otoshi (Bear Drop), which is able to counter Ryoma's smashes, but the latter is determined to find a way to defeat it.
40	"A Duel in the Rain" "Ame no Naka no Kettō" (雨の中の決闘)	July 17, 2002	July 16, 2007
Through his continuous attempts, Ryoma finally figures out a way to defeat Fuji's counter. Meanwhile, the other regulars continue their own matches, with Tezuka quickly defeating his opponent, Momoshiro. Shortly after, the Seigaku practice matches are cut short due to rain. Unsatisfied with the incomplete match, Fuji and Ryoma continue their duel with each other. However, Ryuzaki puts a stop to it, scolding and lecturing them about the consequences.

==== Tokyo Metropolitan Tournament Saga – Part III: Yamabuki Jr. High (Eps. 41–48) ====
No.	Title	Original release date	English airdate
41	"Trouble!" "Haran!" (波乱!)	July 24, 2002	July 30, 2007
While making their way to their match against Yamabuki, some Fudomine players get into a car accident. Though they make it to their match, the trauma of the accident makes them unable to play at full strength against their opponents. After hearing about the accident from Akutsu, Fudomine's captain, Kippei Tachibana, has his team forfeit the match. Meanwhile, scared of being completely defeated, Seigaku's opponent, Ginka willingly forfeits their match, so Seigaku faces their next opponent, Yamabuki.
42	"Oishi is Targeted" "Oishi Being Targeted // Nerawareta Oishi" (狙われた大石)	July 31, 2002	August 13, 2007
Before their match against Yamabuki, Taichi Dan meets and talks to Ryoma about he [Dan] can not be a good tennis player because he is short, not knowing that Ryoma is a regular. During the doubles match, Oishi is targeted by the "Jimmies", a doubles pair who was victorious over Oishi and a senior the previous year. However, in the end, the Jimmies' overconfidence about their previous win results in Eiji and Oishi's victory.
43	"Lucky Sengoku" "Rakkī Sengoku" (ラッキー千石)	August 7, 2002	August 27, 2007
In the singles match, Momoshiro plays against Kiyosumi Sengoku, who is nicknamed Lucky Sengoku due to his outstanding luck. During the match, though Momoshiro seemingly dominates, he loses focus when Sengoku successfully uses Momoshiro's signature technique, the Dunk Smash. Sengoku then reveals his special technique, a powerful jumping serve called the Tiger Cannon. That, combined with his superb motion vision, allows him to take the lead against Momoshiro.
44	"Jack Knife" "Jyakku Naifu" (ジャックナイフ)	August 14, 2002	September 10, 2007
Desperate to win, Momoshiro inadvertently performs a high level technique called the "Jack Knife" during the match. With it, Momoshiro is able to take the lead, and eventually wins the match with sheer will when he realizes he has a cramped foot. Before his match with Akutsu, Ryoma is warned by his friends about his dangerous opponent, however, Ryoma ends up as the aggressive one when he starts the match out with smashing the ball directly toward Akutsu's face.
45	"A Devil on the Court" "Kōto no ue no Akuma" (コートの上の悪魔)	August 21, 2002	September 24, 2007
When Ryoma hits Akutsu in the face with a ball, Akutsu decides to get serious. Ryoma is then easily overwhelmed by Akutsu's physical power, unique and unpredictable tennis style, and "one in ten years" talent. During their match, Akutsu reminiscences about his time as a member of a tennis club, where he easily and mercilessly defeated its members and captain. Watching the match, Taichi Dan also ends up recalling the first time he had met Akutsu, whom he has admired since that day. Back in the present, Akutsu tells Ryoma that he will not score another point.
46	"Samurai Spirit" "Samurai Tamashii" (サムライ魂)	August 28, 2002	October 8, 2007
Akutsu's unique playing style continues to overwhelm Ryoma. Meanwhile, Kawamura reminiscences about Akutsu's violent history, where Akutsu is shown to have always been talented in physical activities. Though Ryoma believes he has finally found a way to overcome his opponent's unique style and score, Akutsu shows his potential as a tennis player. Despite it, Ryoma's determination allows him to finally score a point against Akutsu. As the match continues, Ryoma is finally able to adjust to Akutsu's style.
47	"I Can't Lose!" "Makerarenai!" (負けられない!)	September 4, 2002	October 20, 2007
Evolving with each and every play, Ryoma holds his own against Akutsu, and finally turns the game around. After a flashback of how coach Banji recruited Akutsu into Yamabuki's tennis club, Banji gives Akutsu some "secret advice" in order to help him get back the advantage after seeing that he is starting to struggle. With it, Akutsu's determination to win in the tennis match increases, forcing back Ryoma once again, though the latter refuses to back down.
48	"The Decisive Moment" "Ketchaku no Toki" (決着の瞬間(とき))	September 11, 2002	November 5, 2007
With Ryoma one point away from winning the match, the two, who are now on even footing, continue to struggle against each other. However, in the end, Ryoma's spirit and overwhelming potential help him win in the match, and would also win Akutsu's grudging respect. To everyone's surprise, Akutsu then announces his retirement from tennis. After the tournament's ceremony, Taichi Dan is inspired to become a tennis player by Akutsu and Ryoma.

==== Intraschool Rankings Saga – Part II (Episodes 49–53) ====
No.	Title	Original release date	English airdate
49	"Free-Style Fighting" "Different Kind of Fight // Ishukaku Tōsen" (異種核闘戦)	September 18, 2002	November 19, 2007
When Rikkai Dai's Akaya Kirihara accidentally stops at the wrong bus stop, he ends up visiting Seishun Academy. While he causes trouble for the Seigaku regulars during practice, the freshmen are stuck doing classroom duties. Horio then gets into trouble with an upperclassman, who is also a basketball player. In order to protect him, Ryoma and the basketball player have a free throw contest, with Ryoma using a tennis ball for a basketball and a broom for a racket. When he wins, he forces the upperclassman to do his remaining classroom duties.
50	"A Seigaku Tradition" "Seigaku's Claim to Fame! // Seigaku Meibutsu!" (青学名物!)	September 25, 2002	December 3, 2007
During the intraschool ranking matches, Momoshiro, Inui, and Tezuka all end up in the same block, meaning that one of them will not become a regular. With the other blocks finishing up, some of the regulars secure their spot on the team. However, when Momoshiro is defeated by both Tezuka and Inui, he ends up being the one knocked off the team. Later, Inui, who has been collecting data on his teammates all this time, attempts a victory over the intractable Tezuka.
51	"Inui's Challenge" "Inui no Chōsen" (乾の兆戦)	October 2, 2002	—
Though the game starts off evenly matched, Inui begins to pull ahead by using his determination, the extra training he has done, and the data he has been gathering on Tezuka since their freshman years. As Tezuka continues to struggle against Inui's Data Tennis, Inui manages to return one of Tezuka's difficult drop shots. However, Tezuka reveals uses a technique that shocks both his opponent and the spectators.
52	"Seigaku's Biggest Crisis" "Seigaku Saidai no Kiki" (青学最大の危機)	October 9, 2002	—
Tezuka uses the "Tezuka Zone", a technique which controls the spin of the ball so it will always return to him, and his "Zero-Shiki drop shot", a shot that rolls backward once it falls on the ground, to defeat Inui. Meanwhile, Momoshiro disappears and temporarily leaves the team causing anxiety within the whole team. When discussing Momoshiro's recent leave, Oishi and Eiji get into an argument when Eiji makes some "insensitive remarks", causing a division in the Golden Pair when they separate to play a doubles match with Kaido and Ryoma.
53	"The Momo Who's Returned" "Kaettekita Momo" (帰ってきた桃)	October 16, 2002	—
Momoshiro recovers his spirit after a match with Fudomine student and Tachibana's younger sister, Ann Tachibana, and also with an encounter with two of Hyotei Academy's regulars. Meanwhile, the Golden Pair makes up, and Tezuka is shown refusing Ryuzaki's offer to study abroad in Germany, choosing to stay in order to lead his team to the Nationals.
