= The Prince of Tennis: Futari no Samurai =

- Japanese theatrical release poster
- Directed by: Takayuki Hamana
- Written by: Jun Maekawa
- Produced by: Tetsu Kawaguchi; Susumu Matsuyama; Tomoko Takahashi
- Cinematography: Hisashi Ezura
- Edited by: Junichi Uematsu
- Music by: Cher Watanabe
- Production companies: Production I.G. (animation); NAS (production)
- Distributed by: Shochiku
- Release date: January 29, 2005
- Running time: 60 minutes
- Country: Japan
- Language: Japanese
- Box office: $770,593

The Prince of Tennis: Futari no Samurai (劇場版 テニスの王子様 二人のサムライ THE FIRST GAME, Gekijō-ban Tennis no Ōjisama Futari no Samurai The First Game; lit. 'The Prince of Tennis – The Two Samurai: The First Game') is a 2005 Japanese anime film based on the manga series The Prince of Tennis by Takeshi Konomi. It was produced by Nihon Ad Systems and Production I.G., and directed by Takayuki Hamana. The film premiere aired after another short film spun off from the series titled Tennis no Oujisama: Atobe Kara no Okurimono (跡部からの贈り物; lit. 'The Prince of Tennis: Atobe's Gift Movie Special'). Funimation licensed the film.

== Plot ==
The Seishun Academy Middle School tennis regulars are invited on a cruise by Sakurafubuki Hikomaro to play a match with his own tennis team. Aboard the cruise ship, Ryoga Echizen introduces himself to the team as Ryoma's older brother. Ryoma reveals that Ryoga was adopted by Nanjiroh many years ago, when they lived in America, but mysteriously left home prior to Ryoma enrolling in Seigaku. That evening, after a banquet dinner, Takashi Kawamura, being a sushi chef, remarks that the food did not taste as expensive as it looked. In the bathroom, Sadaharu Inui discovers that the marble on the wall is fake when he tears off a piece of wallpaper. It becomes clear that something is not right. The next day, Sakurafubuki reveals to Tezuka and Oishi that they are actually part of an illegal gambling plot. If they purposely lose their matches the next day, Sakurafubuki will rake in a lot of money from people who have bet on Seigaku winning. But, should they choose not to listen and win the matches, the team faces the grim possibility of losing their lives.

It turns out that everyone on the ship are either gamblers or Sakurafubuki's henchmen, so therefore, Seigaku can only trust themselves. The team tries to form a plan of action while playing the matches as directed, but they are ultimately held hostage by Sakurafubuki's chef when Kikumaru Eiji is caught eavesdropping. Only Tezuka, Fuji, and Echizen are allowed to leave to play their matches. Tezuka and Fuji win their matches easily. Upon seeing Ryoma's performance, Ryoga decides to betray Sakurafubuki in order to play a match against his brother to see who's the better player.

Meanwhile, the rest of the team escape from the room where the chef held them hostage (thanks to Inui's clever usage of his Juice), and then are forced to engage in a rather humorous run from the corrupt crew members. In the end, they are recaptured and bound by Sakurafubuki, who holds them at gunpoint. Ryoma realizes that his teammates' lives are going to be at risk if he continues to play against his brother.

Ryoga decides that he will not be Sakurafubuki's pawn any longer, and fires a tennis ball straight into his forehead. This allows the rest of the team to escape once again. As Ryoma and Ryoga's match continues, a terrible storm brews, forcing everyone on the ship to evacuate through the lifeboats. Seigaku keeps order throughout the panic and helps the passengers, although Momoshiro and Eiji end up falling overboard. The Echizen brothers, however, keep playing their match, even as an enormous tidal wave descends upon the cruise ship. They seem unfazed as they play their match underwater. In the end, Ryoma comes out as the victor when the ball drops onto Ryoga's side of the net, despite that the net is gone and a large light has crashed across the court. Ryoga accepts his defeat and remarks that Ryoma's tennis certainly has improved. The two escape via Ryoga's jet ski, and Ryoma is reunited with his team, who have all escaped the ship unharmed. Ryoga takes Ryoma's hat and gives him an orange and tells him to find his "Grand Dream". After that, he rides his jet ski into the sunset.

Atobe Keigo then arrives at the scene by helicopter to rescue the Seigaku regulars and witnesses Sakurafubuki being arrested. In an earlier phone conversation he had with Oshitari Yuushi, who also appeared along Gakuto Mukahi, the two conversed about how Seigaku had been invited aboard a free cruise. Atobe remarked how he knew all luxury cruise line owners, but never heard of Sakurafubuki, and thus suspected that Seigaku had been caught up in a scam.

== Voice cast ==
Character	Japanese voice actor	English voice actor
Ryoma Echizen	Junko Minagawa	TBA
Ryoga Echizen	Yuuta Yamazaki	TBA
Kunimitsu Tezuka	Ryōtarō Okiayu	TBA
Shuichiro Oishi	Takayuki Kondou	TBA
Shusuke Fuji	Yuki Kaida	TBA
Sadaharu Inui	Kenjirō Tsuda	TBA
Eiji Kikumaru	Hiroki Takahashi	TBA
Takeshi Momoshiro	Masaya Onosaka	TBA
Takashi Kawamura	Naru Kawamoto	TBA
Kaoru Kaido	Kōhei Kiyasu	TBA
Hikomaru Sakurafubuki	Tokuma Nishioka	TBA
