= Kunimitsu Tezuka =

- The Prince of Tennis character
- Kunimitsu Tezuka as portrayed in the anime
- First appearance: Manga chapter 4 Anime episode 3
- Created by: Takeshi Konomi
- Portrayed by: Yu Shirota
- Voiced by: Japanese; Ryōtarō Okiayu; English; Kirk Thornton (Viz Media dub); Jonah Scott (Crunchyroll dub)

In-universe information
- Relatives: Kuniharu Tezuka (father); Ayana Tezuka (mother); Kunikazu Tezuka (paternal grandfather)

Kunimitsu Tezuka (Japanese: 手塚 国光, Hepburn: Tezuka Kunimitsu) is a fictional character in the manga and anime series The Prince of Tennis. He was created by Takeshi Konomi, who described Tezuka as the character with whom he has the least in common. Tezuka's character is well received by readers and has ranked among the top five most popular characters in every Shonen Jump character popularity poll of the series. He is known for his seriousness, strictness, and fair leadership as the captain of the team. Tezuka often sacrifices his injured left arm to defeat opponents and lead his team to victory.

In the story, he is introduced as the strict and serious captain of Seishun Academy's ("Seigaku" for short) tennis team who enforces order within his team, often forcing its members to run laps. With his all-around tennis style and advanced techniques, Tezuka is considered to be a national-level tennis player by many of the other characters.

== Description ==
Tezuka encourages the series protagonist, Ryoma Echizen, to develop his own style of tennis, leading the latter to consider him as both a mentor and rival. Throughout the series, Tezuka continues to struggle with consistent pain in his left arm, which was inflicted on him two years prior to the main storyline by an upperclassman. However, he often sacrifices the use of his arm to defeat opponents and lead his team to the National Tennis Tournament. In addition to appearing in the series other media, including musicals, films, and soundtracks, different types of merchandise have been released in his likeness, including figurines and jewelry.

Tezuka's character has been well received by readers since his introduction, having ranked in the top five most popular characters in every Shonen Jump character popularity poll of series. He has also remained in the top 10 annual Valentine Chocolate Recipient rankings that Takeshi Konomi releases in the manga, in which readers mail in who they want to send chocolate. However, in publications on manga and anime, his character has received mixed reviews. Reviewers comment on his lack of originality and that the impossibility of one of his techniques is part of why the story seems unrealistic. Though one reviewer questions his likability as a protagonist, his personality is praised, with one praising his devotion as one of the highlights of the series, and another commenting that he is a good captain who properly motivates the main character.

== Character outline ==
=== Background ===
Parts of Tezuka's history are revealed throughout several flashbacks in the story. Three years prior, when he was still a relatively unknown tennis player, Tezuka easily defeated the Junior Tennis Tournament's runner-up, Genichiro Sanada, and played evenly against the champion, Seiichi Yukimura. Upon his entrance into Seishun Academy nearly a year later, Tezuka was already a better tennis player than most of his upperclassman. However, when his teammates found out that he is left-handed even though he played against them with his right, they viewed him as arrogant, leading to a jealous teammate injuring his left arm. Despite having made a promise to Shuichiro Oishi that he would lead Seigaku to the Nationals, Tezuka decided to quit the tennis club because he did not want to be on the same team with people who used their racquets to hurt others. Nonetheless, his skills were recognized by then-captain Yūdai Yamato, who wanted Tezuka to become Seigaku's "pillar of support", and entrusted him with the dream of going to the Nationals, which convinced Tezuka to stay.

During that same year, Shusuke Fuji defeated Tezuka in a private tennis match, but Fuji was displeased with the outcome after learning about Tezuka's injury, promising to play him again after his arm heals. Over time, Tezuka secured a regular spot on the team despite being a first-year. By his second year, he became the team's vice-captain and defeated Hyotei Academy's captain during a tournament. Despite not being at full strength due to his injury leading to chronic problems, and his sealing of a powerful technique that required the use of his left arm, Tezuka eventually became known as a National-level tennis player. He was invited to an elite tennis training camp, but due to persistent arm pain, he declined the invitation without explanation to the organization.

=== Personality ===
Tezuka's personality remains consistent throughout the series as he is always serious about everything he does, especially his duties as captain of the tennis team. Despite being very strict, he is fair and sticks to his word, punishing everyone even if the rules are broken by only a few. He would often make the entire team run laps when they break the rules and one of his trademark phrases is ("Yudan sezu ni ikō"). He is determined to lead his team to the Nationals, which often results in him ignoring his doctor's warnings against him playing in arduous tennis matches – considering his health secondary to the team's success, and continuing to risk re-injury in his matches to ensure their victory. Tezuka even risks it all during a match against Ryoma since he sees the boy as the one to succeed him as the team's new "pillar of support".

Also, no matter the situation, he is shown to be rather inexpressive, never changing his stoic expression. However, when he re-injures his arm during his match against Keigo Atobe, he is shown to writhe in pain. This becomes a traumatic memory that makes him unable to lift his arm over his shoulders, fearing the thought of feeling that pain again. He learns to overcome this during his medical retreat in Kyūshū. Due to his experiences, he dislikes those who use tennis to harm others.

In the manga series, Tezuka smiles for the first time after his team becomes the National champions, though he instantly reverts when Fuji points out the fact. In the anime series, he also smiles when Oishi's uncle tells him his elbow was fully healed, and when he sees Momoshiro's potential during a match. His seriousness is compounded by having picked up some character traits from his similarly stern grandfather; ironically, Tezuka looks older than his actual age and is often mistaken as his teammates' teacher. In the anime, his unyielding attitude even prevents him from showing any reaction when he accidentally drinks Sadaharu Inui's vegetable juice, resulting in others believing he is immune to the dreaded concoction. However, he quickly and sternly declines an offer to drink it later on.

=== Tennis style and techniques ===
Portrayed as an all-rounder tennis player, otherwise known as an all-court player, Tezuka can use aspects of every tennis style depending on his needs. His dominant hand is his left hand, though in some parts of the story, he is shown to be capable of executing his techniques with his right hand as well.

Tezuka activating Muga no Kyōchi's first door, Hyaku Ren Jitoku no Kiwami

One of the reasons why other characters acknowledge Tezuka as a National-level tennis player is his infamous Zero-Shiki (Degree) Drop shot. This shot causes the ball to roll away from the opponent and towards the net once it drops on their side of the tennis court (usually landing a foot away from the net), preventing them from hitting the ball again since it does not bounce toward them. He later develops a variation of this technique in the form of a serve called the Zero-Shiki Serve. Another one of Tezuka's signature techniques is the Tezuka Zone (手塚ゾーン, Tezuka Zōn), a technique which involves him putting enough spin on the ball in order to force nearly all hits to be "sucked" into his hit zone, making it unnecessary for him to move around the court. He is also able to use this technique so as to make the ball go out of bounds rather than toward him, with this being dubbed the Tezuka Phantom. However, in order to do this, Tezuka must create an even greater spin on the ball, which can result in Tezuka re-injuring his arm or being permanently sidelined if he uses it consecutively.

Tezuka has also opened all three doors of Muga no Kyōchi (無我の境地; trans. State of Self Actualization), which is a technique in the series that can only be achieved when a tennis player reached and surpasses his limits. Tezuka's Tezuka Zone allows him to focus the effects of one of Muga's doors, Hyaku Ren Jitoku no Kiwami (百錬自得の極み; lit. Pinnacle of Hard Work), into his left arm, preventing the loss of stamina, and giving him the ability to return balls with twice the strength, or spin, that they were hit with. The Saiki Kanpatsu no Kiwami (才気煥発の極み; lit. Pinnacle of Great Wisdom) is another one of Muga's doors, and it focuses the power of one's mind, giving him a form of foresight during the game. He shows that he has opened the final door, Teni Muho No Kiwami, during a match in the Japanese U-17 camp.

== Plot overview ==
As the captain of Seishun Academy's tennis club, Tezuka is the one to give Ryoma a chance to become a regular on the team. Despite being known as Seigaku's "strongest man", he initially remains on the sidelines during tournaments as another teammate sometimes plays his position or their opponent is defeated too early. Though he secretly challenges and defeats Ryoma in an unofficial match, his true skills are first shown during a match against Sadaharu Inui. During the Kanto tournament first-round match against Hyotei's captain, Keigo Atobe, the pain from an old arm injury returns, and though he refuses to give up, the game ends with Atobe's win. In order to receive medical treatment for his injuries, Tezuka goes to Kyūshū (he goes to Germany in the anime). He returns right before the National Tournament, where he unseals a technique that he used to use before his injury to defeat Higa Junior High's captain, Eishiro Kite, in the first match, and then goes on to defeat Hyotei Academy's Munehiro Kabaji in his next match. In the semi-finals, Tezuka plays one-on-one against Shitenhoji's Senri Chitose despite it being a doubles match, and after unveiling two new techniques, Tezuka emerges victorious.

Before his match against Rikkai Junior High's Genichiro Sanada, Tezuka tells Oishi that this will be his last tournament in Japan since he plans to go to Germany in order to become a professional tennis player. During his match, Tezuka develops a variation of one of his techniques, however, the combination of this technique and a strenuous serve, damages Tezuka's arm, creating a weakness which Sanada soon uses to his advantage, and results in the latter's victory. Though he lost, Ryoma's win against Rikkai's captain results in Tezuka finally achieving his goal of turning Seigaku into the National champions. Several months later, Tezuka becomes one of fifty middle school students invited to an elite training camp for the Japanese Under-17 tennis team. After defeating Seigaku's former captain, Yūdai Yamato, in a ranking match, during which he's shown to have completely mastered Muga no Kyochi, he realizes that he has achieved everything he has set out to do and resolves to leave for Germany.

== Appearances in other media ==
Yuu Shirota as Tezuka in the live-action film

In addition to his original appearance in the manga, Tezuka has appeared in all of the series' adaptations and other media, including the anime, films, radio shows, musicals, video games, and many others. In the anime series, the timeline of certain events sometimes differ from the manga, as well as the places mentioned; in the anime, Tezuka goes to Germany for medical treatment rather than to Kyūshū. In addition, there are original events included in the anime, like Tezuka attending the Junior Senbatsu tennis training camp as a coach, and him winning an Interschool Ranking match against Fuji. In the OVA, A Day on Survival Mountain, when the Seigaku team travels to a tennis resort and encounters cocky, college tennis players, Tezuka ends up defeating the team's arrogant coach in a match.

In The Prince of Tennis musicals, also known as Tenimyu, the events of the series are reenacted via various musical performances, in which the characters' traits are often parodied; the actor, in character, often has to point out in mid-performance that he is, in fact, only fourteen years of age. Tezuka is portrayed by several actors in the musical, including Eiji Takigawa, Yuu Shirota, Keisuke Minami, Daisuke Watanabe, Ryouma Baba, Takuma Wada, Hideya Tawada, and Takuma Zaiki.

As a member of the central tennis team in the series, Tezuka is featured in several of the anime's soundtracks, as well as spawning a few character CDs featuring only his character. Also, since he is one of the few characters in the series who wear glasses, he, along with Sadaharu Inui and Yuushi Oshitari, is part of the 眼鏡 (lit. glasses); character CDs focusing solely on the trio have been released.

Tezuka also appears in both the animated and live-action films. In the animated film, The Prince of Tennis: Futari no Samurai, his team is invited to a cruise trip where they are forced to play in rigged tennis matches. Initially, Tezuka was supposed to play against Ryoga Echizen, but plays and wins against a different person in order to let Ryoma play against Ryoga. In The Prince of Tennis live action film, the story follows the events that lead to Seigaku playing against Hyotei, and Tezuka is portrayed by Yuu Shirota.

== Reception ==
In every Shonen Jump character popularity poll of series, Tezuka has remained in the top five most popular characters; besides the first poll, where he came in fifth place, he has remained in the fourth spot since the second poll in 2002. In addition, in the annual Valentine Chocolate Recipient rankings Takeshi Konomi releases in the manga, Tezuka received the second largest number of chocolates in the 2001 rankings. However, since then, his rank has continued to decline; the following year, he took the fifth spot. in 2004, he slipped down a rank to sixth; and in 2005, his rank slipped to eighth place. During another one of Konomi's manga segments, in which fans were to send postcards in order to have their name listed as one of Tezuka's classmates, the replies were so overwhelming that the results had to be postponed for another volume. Also, in the Prince of Tennis Character Book 40.5, though Konomi comments that Tezuka is the character who is most unlike himself, he states that Tezuka would be the character he would pick to play doubles with, as well as want to be able to use his signature moves: Tezuka Zone and Tezuka Phantom. Various types of merchandise have been released in his likeness, including figurines, key chains, and jewelry.

In publications focused on manga and anime reviews, Tezuka's character has received mixed reviews. First off, one of his techniques is negatively reviewed, with John Sinnott of DVD Talk seeing it as one of the reasons why the story is "idiotic". Also, Chris Beveridge and Jarred Pine, reviewers from an entertainment website called Mania, both see him as unoriginal, with Chris describing him as one of the series' archetypes, more precisely as the "serious prodigy...who will change the face of tennis," and Jarred calling him a "cookie-cutter character". However, Chris also comments that since Tezuka takes his duties seriously, he is a good captain and is able to motivate the main character, Ryoma, in the right direction. Holly Ellingwood of ACTIVE Anime, an anime news and reviews site, praises his personality, citing that his willingness to sacrifice his arm for his team in the manga's seventeenth volume is a "noble action and higher deed", and is one of the reasons why this manga is at the top of its genre. In another review of volume 17, one of Mangalife's reviewers, Michael Aronson, has a more negative comment, stating that he "comes off looking more passive and stiff in contrast [to Keigo Atobe]", and despite his revealed backstory, he is held back from being a likable protagonist because he remains a mystery to readers.
