= Sisters of Wellber =

Japanese anime television series

- Cover of the first DVD volume

ウエルベールの物語 〜Sisters of Wellber〜 (Werubēru no Monogatari ~Sisters of Wellber~)
- Genre: Fantasy, Adventure
- Manga

MUZZLE-LOADER ~Werubēru no Monogatari~
- Written by: Naruse Takami
- Published by: Mag Garden
- Magazine: Monthly Comic Blade
- Original run: February 28, 2007 – November 30, 2007
- Volumes: 2
- Anime television series
- Directed by: Takayuki Hamana
- Produced by: Katsuji Morishita (Production I.G); Yoshito Takaya (avex entertainment)
- Written by: Atsushi Maekawa
- Music by: Akio Dobashi
- Studio: Trans Arts (animation production); Production I.G (production assistance)
- Original network: Tokyo MX, Mētele, ABC, AT-X
- Original run: April 3, 2007 – March 25, 2008
- Episodes: 26

Sisters of Wellber (Japanese: ウエルベールの物語 〜Sisters of Wellber〜, Hepburn: Werubēru no Monogatari ~Sisters of Wellber~) is a fantasy anime television series animated by Trans Arts (with production assistance by Production I.G). Directed by Takayuki Hamana (浜名 孝行, Hamana Takayuki), the director behind the renowned Prince of Tennis TV series and animated movies, Sisters of Wellber began airing in Japan on Tokyo MX, Mētele, ABC, and AT-X in April 2007.

A related manga, MUZZLE-LOADER 〜Wellber Stories〜 (MUZZLE-LOADER 〜ウエルベールの物語〜, MUZZLE-LOADER ~Werubēru no Monogatari~), began serialization on February 28, 2007, in Monthly Comic Blade, one of Mag Garden's magazines.

A second season started on January 1, 2008, picking up just where the first season left off.

== Plot ==
On the first season, Rita, the princess of the Kingdom of Wellber, stabs her sadist betrothed, Prince Gernia of Sangatras, and flees the city together with Tina, a feisty cat burglar who has given her refuge and offered to hire on as her bodyguard. Rita must travel on a secret diplomatic mission to the remote Kingdom of Greedom in a last-ditch attempt to prevent a full-scale war between Wellber and Sangatras.

In the second season, Sisters of Wellber Zwei, the group arrived at Greedom just in time to prevent a war between Wellber and Sangatras. After this is resolved, Tina is looking for information about her parents' murderer, the man with the wasp tattoo.

== Characters ==
Tina Lothar (テイナ·ローター, Teina Rōtā)
Voiced by: Junko Takeuchi
A professional cat burglar, Tina gets involved with the kingdom's princess Rita when she breaks into the royal palace to steal a golden statue. Tina is very skilled with her pistols, but prefers not to kill people. She was hired by Weiss as Rita's bodyguard, and the two of them have set out for the kingdom of Greedom, where Tina hopes to find the murderer of her parents.
Rita Sior (リタ·シオ-ル, Rita Shiōru)
Voiced by: Mikako Takahashi
A princess in the Kingdom of Wellber. She stabs the Sangatras kingdom's prince, her betrothed who was attempting to rape her, and flees the palace together with Tina. To prevent a war with Sangatras, Rita's only hope is to travel to the neutral Kingdom of Greedom on a secret diplomatic mission. Surprisingly, for a sheltered princess, Rita is quite proficient in hand-to-hand combat. Later, she becomes affectionate towards Tina and is shown in one episode thanking Tina with a warm kiss on the cheek.
Cyrano de Bergerac (ジラノ·ド·ボルジュラック, Jirano do Borujurakku)
Voiced by: Yuuichi Nagashima
A highly mobile and unusually well-armed tankette with an advanced A.I. Serving as a transportation vehicle in lieu of a horse for Rita, Cyrano refuses to let commoners such as Tina mount him. He also serves as an advisor for Rita. He is a little overprotective to Rita as well as a bit expressive, but he's devoutly loyal to her. Cyrano is equipped with two shield-like removable panels, a small sub-cannon and a powerful main cannon, which renders him asleep after its use.
He is named after Cyrano de Bergerac, who was a 17th-century French dramatist,
Bergerac used to be a normal human being before living as a tank. He was one of Wellber's royal guards who met Renaldo Vinci, a frail but famous engineer, and quickly became fascinated by his work. However, Bergerac was ordered to kill Renaldo so he will not develop machinery for rival countries. Bergerac could not do such and warned Renaldo about it, but not before he got caught by his lieutenant. As he was about to shoot Renaldo, Bergerac took his pistol, destined to kill Renaldo, and kill his lieutenant. However, the lieutenant took one last breath and mortally shot Bergerac to the chest. As Renaldo watched his friend dies, he decided to put Bergerac's mind into the tank so he could live. Back in Episode 1, it is assumed that Bergerac was locked up as punishment for disobeying orders and killing his lieutenant, but was freed when Tina and Rita fled Wellber.
Sherry
Voiced by: Eri Sendai
A sprite that is friends with Tina. She has the habit of finishing every sentence with the word "beru".
Galahad Eiger
Voiced by: Daisuke Namikawa
A military officer of Sangatras and a friend of Prince Gernia since childhood, he made it his personal mission to avenge Gernia by killing Rita. His sword has a pistol hidden within, which he would use for ranged combat as well as to wound unsuspecting opponents. After learning Gernia's secret, however, he deserted with his ultimate intention unknown to others.
King Hydel Sior (ハイドル·シオ-ル, Haidoru Shiōru)
Voiced by: Hitoshi Bifu
Ruler of the Kingdom of Wellber.
Rodin Sior
Voiced by: Tomokazu Sugita
Prince of the Kingdom of Wellber and elder brother of Rita, whom he quite cares for. He has a fortune-telling ability and is convinced that Wellber is in grave danger. It is revealed that Rodin is the infamous Death Wasp murdered who slew Tina's parents. However, he later reveals to her that he was part of a special unit that got decimated in a battle. Upon seeing the dead bodies of his comrades, Rodin went insane for a moment and killed dozens of citizens and soldiers.
Weiss
Voiced by: Satoshi Tsuruoka
A much-trusted military officer of King Hydel. The quest for Greedom was given via him.
Jin
Voiced by: Takuma Terashima
Both a business and romantic partner of Tina's. He sells the items that Tina steals on the black market.
Prince Gernia Han (ゲルニア, Gerunia)
Voiced by: Toshiyuki Kusuda
Prince of Sangatras, to whom Rita was betrothed. He is stabbed by Rita when he tries to rape her, apparently, on his official visit.
Rambernoff
Ruler of the Kingdom of Sangatras. He sends his son Gernia to marry Rita while plotting to wage war against Wellber at the same time. There is no better excuse than his son being assaulted by the princess of Wellber.
Jamille Kyra (ジャミール·カエラ, Jamiiru Kaera)
Voiced by: Yuki Kaida
The commanding officer of the Sangatras Army's White Lion Regiment, seemingly in a relationship with Galahad.

== First season episodes ==
| No. | Title | Original release date |
|---|---|---|
| 1 | "Chapter of Beginning" "Hajimari no Shō" (始まりの章) | April 3, 2007 |
Tina's life gets tangled with that of princess Rita when Tina breaks into the palace and becomes the unwilling witness to Rita's crime. Hiring on as a bodyguard, Tina leaves town with Rita.
| 2 | "Chapter of Journey" "Tabidachi no Shō" (旅立ちの章) | April 10, 2007 |
The girls arrive at the port town of Zazan in order to prepare for their trip to Greedom, but Tina has to deal with Princess Rita's ignorance about living as a civilian, as well as outside of the castle.
| 3 | "Chapter of Vengeance" "Fukushū no Shō" (復讐の章) | April 17, 2007 |
The girls encounter an hooded crossbow sniper who's been terrorizing a local town. Tina also get interested at meeting this sniper, who sports a strange tattoo.
| 4 | "Chapter of Determination" "Ketsui no Shō" (決意の章) | April 24, 2007 |
Tina decides to hide Rita in the city of Dust Lust while she and Cyrano try to distract the pursuing bounty hunters. Rita is very grateful to the people who hide her and, in order to pay her debt, decides to work for them.
| 5 | "Chapter of Escape" "Dasshutsu no Shō" (脱出の章) | May 1, 2007 |
While acting as a decoy to let Rita escape from bounty hunters, Tina is injured and thrown off the carriage. She is saved by one of the Transporters, but misses the appointed time to meet Rita. The Transporters are asking Tina to stay with them and Cyrano is pressuring Rita to leave for Greedom.
| 6 | "Chapter of Truth" "Shinjitsu no Shō" (真実の章) | May 8, 2007 |
As the tension between Wellber and Sangatras increases, Tina and Rita enter the kingdom of Ron but are soon separated by a snowstorm. Galahad soon catches up with them and Rita must face him without Tina, but he is bitten by a poisonous spider and Rita decides to help him. The truth behind the night of the murder attempt comes to light.
| 7 | "Chapter of Pursuit" "Tsuiseki no Shō" (追跡の章) | May 15, 2007 |
On their way to the town of Roam, Tina and Rita get intercepted by a sentry guard who inspect them before entering. However, they soon realize that not only their gold is gone, but so is the petition.
| 8 | "Chapter of Confession" "Kokuhaku no Shō" (告白の章) | May 22, 2007 |
Galahad is questioning himself about his role in the war, as well as what happened that night with prince Gernia, which seems strikingly linked to a series of murders involving young women. Galahad asks to visit the prince, who has recovered from his fight with princess Rita, and learns something that could endanger both countries.
| 9 | "Chapter of Parting" "Ketsubetsu no Shō" (決別の章) | May 29, 2007 |
Rita orders Tina to stop her stealing streak but she's tired of this. Although Tina promised to keep her hands clean, rumors of a female masked thief stir up some casualties between the girls. Meanwhile, Jamille prepares to accept her punishment, but prince Gernia spares her.
| 10 | "Chapter of Bonding" "Kizuna no Shō" (絆の章) | June 5, 2007 |
Tina is fired by princess Rita from her bodyguard services after witnessing her with a stolen vase. However, with the help of Jin who catches the real thief, Rita soon realizes that Tina has been framed, and she starts to look for her to apologize. Meanwhile, Tina is on the road with an old friend who she helps out, but can't stop thinking about Rita.
| 11 | "Chapter of Wailing" "Dōkoku no Shō" (慟哭の章) | June 12, 2007 |
Galahad tries to forget the latest events by helping a local town. Meanwhile Jamille confronts prince Gernia, with dire consequences. Meanwhile Tina, Rita, Jin, Sherry, and Cyrano boards a ship for Greedom.
| 12 | "Chapter of Sentiment" "Jōnen no Shō" (情念の章) | June 19, 2007 |
In order to save a group of passengers aboard a ship, Rita agree to be taken to Gernia. Tina and Jin then prepare themselves to save the princess, who just made a frightening discovery.
| 13 | "Chapter of Blood" "Kessen no Shō" (血戦の章) | June 26, 2007 |
Tina, Jin and Galahad storm Gernia's castle in order to save Rita. Meanwhile, Rita is told the prince's story as well as his gruesome hobbies.

== Second season episodes ==
| No. | Title | Original release date |
|---|---|---|
| 14 | "Chapter of Reunion" "Saikai no Shō" (再会の章) | January 1, 2008 |
The gang finally arrives in Greedom in one last hope to prevent a war between Wellber and Sangatras. While Rita discusses diplomatic matters with the King of Greedom, Tina and Jin investigate the local guild to get information about the wasp tattoo murderer. Though even both girls are getting what they want, something is still missing between each other.
| 15 | "Chapter of Scars" "Kizuato no Shō" (疵跡の章) | January 8, 2008 |
The gang arrives at Regalu, a once-small town turned into ruins, which brings back painful memories to Tina.
| 16 | "Chapter of Secret" "Himitsu no Shō" (秘密の章) | January 15, 2008 |
After arriving in a local metropolis, Tina leaves shortly the group to gather more information on the wasp-tattooed man. After searching the whole town, she stumbles on a small house inhabited by a blind elderly woman. While she does not suspect a thing from Tina, her grandson Reggie is quite reluctant to even speak to her.
| 17 | "Chapter of Heartbreak" "Shōshin no Shō" (傷心の章) | January 22, 2008 |
Jin had enough of Galahad staying too close of Tina. In a carnival in a local town, Jin tries to admit his feelings to Tina.
| 18 | "Chapter of Vicissitude" "Ruten no Shō" (流転の章) | January 29, 2008 |
Sherry gets struck by a fever. While she recovers, Tina and Rita try to get their minds straight about Galahad. Meanwhile, Galahad is dealing with the loss of Jamille.
| 19 | "Chapter of Resistance" "Kōsō no Shō" (抗争の章) | February 5, 2008 |
Tina investigates a guild led by one of the wasp-tattooed man's subordinate while Rita and Gahalad infiltrate the local thief guild to back up Tina's operation.
| 20 | "Chapter of Parting" "Betsuri no Shō" (別離の章) | February 12, 2008 |
A quarrel erupts between Tina and Rita when Tina learns about Rita's feelings for Galahad, cause him to leave the team.
| 21 | "Chapter of Recollection" "Tsuioku no Shō" (追憶の章) | February 19, 2008 |
The gang finally arrive to Wellber, but Bergerac occurs malfunctioning problems. While they look for an engineer in order to repair him, Bergerac tells them about his origins.
| 22 | "Chapter of the Death Wasp" "Shinigami Bachi no Shō" (死神蜂の章) | February 26, 2008 |
Rita introduces Tina and Galahad to her father and makes an announcement about her marriage with Galahad, much to Weiss's dismay. Tina also learns the shocking truth about her bounty.
| 23 | "Chapter of Assassination" "Ansatsu no Shō" (暗殺の章) | March 4, 2008 |
Tina investigates the Death Wasp murderer within the castle wall and discovers that her target is none other than Rita's brother, Rodin. Meanwhile, the king of Greedom is making his moves against Sangatras.
| 24 | "Chapter of War Outbreak" "Kaisen no Shō" (開戦の章) | March 11, 2008 |
Greedom launch a full-scaled assault against Wellber, using a massive warship stolen from the Sangatras Kingdom.
| 25 | "Chapter of Destiny" "Tenmei no Shō" (天命の章) | March 18, 2008 |
The Rodin team which is composed of Rodin, Rita, Tina and the King of Wellber boards Greedom's warship using small aircraft, but it's not long before the King of Wellber and Princess Rita are captured.
| 26 | "Chapter of Realization" "Ketsujitsu no Shō" (結実の章) | March 25, 2008 |
Rodin and Tina manage to destroy the warship's engine room, while Rita arrives in time to save her father. However, this victory over Greedom has its share of losses.

== Staff ==
| Original Concept: | Boyakasha |
| Producers: | Atsushi Suzuki, Mitsuhisa Ishikawa |
| Planning: | Yoshita Takaya, Shōji Morishita |
| Series Composition: | Jun Maekawa |
| Character Designs: | Haruko Īzuka, Nariyuki Takahashi |
| Art Director and Settings: | Seiko Akashi |
| Directors of Photography: | Kenichi Dai, Akihiro Saitō |
| CG Director: | Kenji Isobe |
| Color Design: | Misako Akama |
| Editing: | Junichi Uematsu |

| Sound Director: | Takuya Hiramitsu |
| Music: | Akio Dobashi |
| Music Production: | ZOOM FLICKER |
| Animation Production: | Trans Arts |
| Production Assistance: | Production I.G |
| Animation Producers: | Toshiaki Morita, Kazuto Kanno |
| CGI Producer: | Kenji Watanabe |
| Program Producers: | Masaaki Mizuno, Takafumi Nishimoto (Mētele) |
| Director: | Takayuki Hamana |
| Production: | Mētele, Avex Group, Production I.G |
