= The Prince of Tennis II =

Japanese manga series and its adaptations

- First tankōbon volume cover, featuring Ryoma Echizen

新テニスの王子様 (Shin Tennis no Ōjisama)
- Genre: Sports
- Manga

The New Prince of Tennis
- Written by: Takeshi Konomi
- Published by: Shueisha
- Imprint: Jump Comics SQ.
- Magazine: Jump Square
- Original run: March 4, 2009 – August 4, 2026
- Volumes: 48
Further information
Anime television series
Directed by	Hideyo Yamamoto
Music by	Cher Watanabe
Studio	M.S.C; Production I.G
Licensed by	Crunchyroll
Original network	TV Tokyo, TVA, TVO
Original run	January 5, 2012 – March 29, 2012
Episodes	13
Original video animation
Special
Directed by	Hideyo Yamamoto
Music by	Cher Watanabe
Studio	M.S.C; Production I.G
Licensed by	Crunchyroll
Released	April 20, 2012 – April 24, 2013
Runtime	23 minutes
Episodes	7
Original video animation
OVA vs. Genius 10
Directed by	Hideyo Yamamoto
Music by	Cher Watanabe
Studio	M.S.C; Production I.G
Licensed by	Crunchyroll
Released	October 28, 2014 – June 26, 2015
Runtime	23 minutes
Episodes	10
Original net animation
Hyotei vs. Rikkai Game of Future
Directed by	Keiichiro Kawaguchi
Written by	Mitsutaka Hirota
Music by	Chihiro Tamaki
Studio	M.S.C; Studio Kai
Licensed by	Crunchyroll
Released	February 13, 2021 – April 17, 2021
Runtime	48 minutes
Episodes	2
Anime television series
U-17 World Cup
Directed by	Keiichiro Kawaguchi
Written by	Mitsutaka Hirota
Music by	Chihiro Tamaki
Studio	M.S.C; Studio Kai
Licensed by	Crunchyroll
Original network	TV Tokyo
Original run	July 7, 2022 – September 29, 2022
Episodes	13
Anime television series
U-17 World Cup Semifinal
Directed by	Yoshinobu Tokumoto
Written by	Mitsutaka Hirota
Music by	Chihiro Tamaki
Studio	M.S.C
Licensed by	Crunchyroll
Original network	TV Tokyo
Original run	October 3, 2024 – December 26, 2024
Episodes	13
Anime television series
U-17 World Cup Finals Members Decisive Match
Directed by	Yoshinobu Tokumoto
Written by	Mitsutaka Hirota
Music by	Chihiro Tamaki
Studio	M.S.C
Licensed by	Crunchyroll
Original network	TV Tokyo
Original run	October 1, 2026 – present
Episodes	1
- icon

The Prince of Tennis II, known in Japan as The New Prince of Tennis (Japanese: 新テニスの王子様, Hepburn: Shin Tennis no Ōjisama), is a Japanese manga series written and illustrated by Takeshi Konomi. It is a sequel to Konomi's manga series The Prince of Tennis. It was serialized in Shueisha's shōnen manga magazine Jump Square from March 2009 to August 2026, with its chapters collected in 48 tankōbon volumes.

A 13-episode anime television series adaptation was broadcast on TV Tokyo from January to March 2012. A 13-episode sequel anime television series, titled The Prince of Tennis II: U-17 World Cup, aired from July to September 2022; it was followed by The Prince of Tennis II: U-17 World Cup Semifinal, which aired from October to December 2024. Another new sequel titled The Prince of Tennis II: U-17 World Cup Finals Members Decisive Match premiered in October 2026.

== Plot ==
The New Prince of Tennis is set shortly after the end of the original manga. Ryoma Echizen returns to Japan after his trip to America as a candidate for the Japanese U-17 (under 17) High School Representatives Selection Camp, along with 50 other middle school tennis players.

== Media ==
=== Manga ===
Written and illustrated by Takeshi Konomi, The New Prince of Tennis was announced by Shueisha's Jump Square on November 4, 2008. It was serialized in the magazine from March 4, 2009, to August 4, 2026. Shueisha collected its chapters in 48 tankōbon volumes, released from August 4, 2009, to September 4, 2026.

=== Anime ===
A 13-episode anime television series adaptation by Production I.G and M.S.C ran from January 5 to March 29, 2012. (Note: TV Tokyo listed the air dates for the series on Wednesday at 25:50, which is effectively Thursday at 1:50 a.m. JST.) The episodes were collected in seven DVDs, released from April 20, 2012, to April 24, 2013. Each DVD included a special original video animation (OVA) episode. Crunchyroll streamed the series.

A ten-episode OVA, titled The Prince of Tennis II OVA vs. Genius 10, was released on five DVDs from October 29, 2014, to June 26, 2015. The OVA has been streamed by Crunchyroll.

A two-part original net animation (ONA) by Studio Kai and M.S.C, titled The Prince of Tennis II: Hyotei vs. Rikkai Game of Future, was released on February 13 and April 17, 2021, respectively.

In April 2021, Funimation announced that they licensed the entire The Prince of Tennis anime franchise. and The Prince of Tennis II was added to their platform on August 17 of the same year.

During the 20th anniversary event of The Prince of Tennis on October 10, 2021, it was announced that a new anime television series titled The Prince of Tennis II: U-17 World Cup was being produced. The staff of the Hyotei vs. Rikkai Game of Future ONA series, as well as the main cast members, reprised their roles. It aired from July 7 to September 29, 2022, on TV Tokyo. (Note: TV Tokyo listed the air dates for the series on Wednesday at 24:00, which is effectively Thursday at midnight.) The opening theme song is "I Can Fly" by Yoshiki Ezaki and Bleecker Chrome, while the ending theme song is "Dear Friends" by TeniPri Artistars. Crunchyroll has licensed the series, streaming it along with an English dub.

In June 2023, a sequel to the series, subtitled U-17 World Cup Semifinal, was announced. It aired from October 3 to December 26, 2024, on TV Tokyo. (Note: TV Tokyo listed the air dates for the series on Wednesday at 24:00, which is effectively Thursday at midnight.) The opening theme song is "Wake Up", performed by Kindella, while the ending theme song is "Glanz", performed by Emblem=Adler, a unit consisting of voice actors of the anime's German team—Ryōtarō Okiayu (Kunimitsu Tezuka), Kentaro Tone (Jürgen Borisovich Volk), and Mitsuki Saiga (Q.P.). Crunchyroll licensed the sequel as well.

In September 2025, another new sequel to the series, subtitled U-17 World Cup Finals Members Decisive Match, was announced. It premiered on October 1, 2026, on TV Tokyo. The opening theme song is "Walls And Bridges", performed by Aozu, a unit consisting of voice actors Junko Minagawa (Ryōma Echizen), Ryōtarō Okiayu (Kunimitsu Tezuka), Yuki Kaida (Syusuke Fuji), Takayuki Kondo (Shuichiro Ōishi), while the ending theme song is "Glanz", performed by Junichi Suwabe (Keigo Atobe) and Hidenobu Kiuchi (Yūshi Oshitari). Crunchyroll also licensed the new sequel.
