= Super Lovers =

Japanese manga series

- Cover of Super Lovers volume one
- Genre: Boy's Love, Romantic comedy
- Manga
- Written by: Miyuki Abe
- Published by: Kadokawa
- Magazine: Ciel (2009–2014); Emerald (2014–present)
- Original run: 30 October 2009 – present
- Volumes: 20
- Anime television series
- Directed by: Shinji Ishihira
- Written by: Yoshiko Nakamura
- Music by: Yasuharu Takanashi; Shūji Katayama; Kenji Katō
- Studio: Studio Deen
- Licensed by: NA: Crunchyroll; SA/SEA: Medialink
- Original network: AT-X, Tokyo MX, Sun TV, BS11, TV Saitama, Chiba TV, tvk, GBS, MTV, TVQ
- Original run: 6 April 2016 – 16 March 2017
- Episodes: 20 + 2 OVAs

Super Lovers (stylized in all caps) is a Japanese yaoi manga series published in the magazine Emerald by Miyuki Abe. An anime adaptation premiered in April 2016. A second season premiered in January 2017.

== Plot ==
Haru Kaido goes to visit Canada and spend his summer vacation in the woodland house of his strict, strong-willed mother Haruko who purposely fools her son into believing that she's on "the verge of death" only to burden him with the responsibility of taking care of her newly adopted "puppy". That "puppy", in actuality, is a small, rash, anti-social little boy named Ren who doesn't trust anyone and would prefer hanging out with Haruko's dogs. Haruko orders Haru to "civilize" Ren until the end of summer. As the young man struggles in doing everything he can to help Ren, their relationship gradually improves; so far so that when Haru graduated high school, he planned on taking Ren to Japan for them to live together with his twin half-brothers.

Unfortunately, an accident occurs that causes the death of Haru's father and stepmother, leaving him the only survivor. The accident causes him to lose his memories of that summer.

Five years later, Ren comes to Tokyo, Japan and claims Haru as his new "brother". Will Haru adjust to his new role in life and keep that promise to Ren? Or will he deny Ren as his brother?

== Characters ==
=== Kaidō Household ===
Haru Kaidō (海棠 晴, Kaidō Haru)
Voiced by: Toshiyuki Morikawa (drama CD), Tomoaki Maeno (TV anime Japanese)
The eldest brother and the head household of the Kaidou family. He is the adopted brother to Ren and half-brother to Aki and Shima. Five years ago, when he went to visit Canada, he met Ren. Even though Ren was quite hostile towards him, he managed to make Ren open his heart. He lost his memories of that summer when he came back to Japan due to an accident. When he meets Ren again he isn't too keen about the whole "brother" thing, but he quickly warms up to him again. He dotes on Ren, to the annoyance of the younger boy as well as Haru's younger twin brothers, especially Aki. He is quarter-Canadian. He has a kind and child-like personality and cares dearly for all of his brothers, especially Ren.
Ren Kaidō (海棠 零, Kaidō Ren)
Voiced by: Hiroshi Kamiya, Yūko Sanpei (young Japanese) (drama CD), Junko Minagawa (TV anime Japanese)
The fourth and youngest brother of the Kaidou family. Five years earlier, he was a wild anti-social little brat that behaved like a dog which led to Haruko having a hard time raising him. When he first met Haru, his life gradually changed and started to accept the society life because of him. He attends a co-ed high school in Tokyo and is starting to make friends. In the series, Ren has a calm and steady personality, and he acts more mature for his age. According to Haruko, there is a possibility of his birth name being Allen and that his biological mother was a drug addict who sold him for drugs. This, however, has not been outright confirmed.
Aki Kaidō (海棠 亜樹, Kaidō Aki)
Voiced by: Jun Fukuyama (drama CD), Yoshitsugu Matsuoka (TV anime Japanese)
The second brother of the Kaidou family. He has a brash, stubborn attitude compare to his younger twin. He seems to have a slight brother complex when it comes to Haru and Shima. He isn't very fond of Ren at first, but gradually warms up to him over time especially when they all start living together.
Shima Kaidō (海棠 蒔麻, Kaidō Shima)
Voiced by: Daisuke Ono (drama CD), Takuma Terashima (TV anime Japanese)
The third brother of the Kaidou family. He has a calm personality and is taller than his older twin. He is more understanding than his brother when it comes to things concerning Ren.
Takashi Kaidō (海棠 崇, Kaidō Takashi)
Voiced by: Teruaki Ogawa (drama CD and TV anime Japanese)
Haru's biological father. He passes away in a car accident in the beginning of the series.
Ruri Kaidō (海棠 留理, Kaidō Ruri)
Voiced by: Yūko Sasaki (drama CD and TV anime Japanese)
Haru's stepmother. She passes away in a car accident in the beginning of the series.

=== Others ===
Ikuyoshi Sasaki (佐々木 郁芳, Sasaki Ikuyoshi)
Voiced by: Itsuki Takizawa (drama CD), Ayumu Murase (TV anime Japanese)

A host and fellow worker of Haru with a friendly and lively demeanor. He admires Haru and follows him working on the cafe White Fang, where he provides the food through his family in the country. He affectionately calls Ren as Ren Ren.

Jūzen Kurosaki (黒崎 十全, Kurosaki Jūzen)
Voiced by: Kazuyuki Okitsu (drama CD), Jun Fukushima (TV anime Japanese)
Ren's best friend and classmate. He lives in a student dorm next to their school. When Ren asks him specific questions, it embarrasses him.
Haruko D. Dieckmann (春子・D・ディークマン, Haruko Di Dīkuman)
Voiced by: Atsuko Tanaka (drama CD and TV anime Japanese)
Haru's biological mother and Ren's adopted mother. She stayed with Ren after Haru left for Japan. In the Manga and Anime, it is said that she is a CERN member and is friends with Mikiko.
Mikiko Kashiwagi (柏木 幹子, Kashiwagi Mikiko)
Voiced by: Yōko Sōmi (drama CD and TV anime Japanese)
A lawyer friend of Haruko who is part of a wealthy family and acts as a correspondent between Haru and Haruko. She sometimes drops by the house to check up on them.
Kiri Kondō (近藤 紀里, Kondō Kiri)
Voiced by: Eri Kitamura (drama CD), Ryoko Shiraishi (TV anime Japanese)
A female student and another friend of Ren's at his school.
Shirō Takamura (高村史郎, Takamura Shirō)
Voiced by: Ryōtarō Okiayu
The school nurse at Ren's school.
Seiji Takamori (高森 清次, Takamori Seiji)/Kiyoka (清華, Kiyoka)
Voiced by: Mitsuki Saiga (drama CD and TV anime Japanese)
A friend from Haru's high school days. He is seen dressing in women's outfits and takes on the name Kiyoka. He helps Haru when he decides to open up his own cafe by working the bar after six. He has confessed to Haru before but was rejected.
Ai Natsukawa (夏川 亜衣, Natsukawa Ai)
Voiced by: Aoi Yūki
A female student of Shima's and is her first year in middle school. Since her parents got divorced she is living with her grandparents; she appears in episode 8. When she was first introduced, she had a small crush on Shima. It is unknown if she still has the crush or not.
Mimi Anzai (安西 ミミ, Anzai Mimi)
Voiced by: Ayaka Fukuhara
A regular customer of The White Fang Cafe, she has wavy blonde hair. She and Wakana appear in episode 9.
Wakana Anzai (安西 若菜, Anzai Wakana)
Voiced by: Eriko Matsui
Mimi's sister and is another customer of The White Fang, she has short hazel brown hair.
Natsuo Shiba (斯波 夏生, Shiba Natsuo)
Voiced by: Takuya Satō
A bartender working at Host-(Haru's previous job) and Haru's childhood friend and cousin. At times he can be very assertive and exhibit otherwise reckless behavior and/or attitude towards people. Additionally, Natsuo is shown to be extremely lazy. Even if his house is messy; with litter all over the ground and revenge-graffiti from his ex covering the walls, he still refuses to clean and continues to inhabit the place. Haru became quite fond of Natsuo. When they were together, they'd look like brothers because of appearances. Natsuo can be good-natured or kind, but this is often disregarded by his sometimes obnoxious demeanor. Natsuo was separated from the Kaidou family at a young age because his father borrowed money from them and ran away to avoid paying it.
Mori Kazushi (和志 森, Kazushi Mori)
Voiced by: Kenji Hamada
A psychotherapist who works at the same hospital that Haru was admitted to after the latter was involved in a fatal car crash. He was the one who helped Haru recover from his injuries and keeps in touch with Mikiko. He has a happy and cheerful personality.

== Media ==
=== Manga ===
Abe began publishing Super Lovers in Kadokawa's Ciel magazine in 2009, before switching to the Emerald magazine upon its 31 August 2014 launch. Twenty volumes have been published as of September 2025.

In 2017, at Yaoi-Con, Viz Media stated that they received requests to license the manga in English for North American distribution, but they decided against it due to content issues.

==== Volumes ====
No.	Japanese release date	Japanese ISBN
1	28 July 2010	978-4-04-854500-6
2	26 November 2010	978-4-04-854562-4
3	28 June 2011	978-4-04-854644-7
4	28 November 2011	978-4-04-120074-2
5	30 August 2012	978-4-04-120388-0
6	1 November 2013	978-4-04-120900-4
7	1 August 2014	978-4-04-101894-1
8	1 August 2015	978-4-04-103300-5
9	30 April 2016	978-4-04-104150-5
10	1 January 2017	978-4-04-104151-2; ISBN 978-4-04-104152-9 (limited edition)
11	1 September 2017	978-4-04-105295-2; ISBN 978-4-04-105294-5 (limited edition)
12	28 December 2018	978-4-04-107622-4
13	30 August 2019	978-4-04-108600-1; ISBN 978-4-04-108601-8 (limited edition)
14	1 September 2020	978-4-04-109799-1; ISBN 978-4-04-109798-4 (limited edition)
15	1 September 2021	978-4-04-111665-4
16	1 September 2022	978-4-04-112834-3; ISBN 978-4-04-112835-0 (limited edition)
17	1 September 2023	978-4-04-113998-1
18	30 August 2024	978-4-04-115199-0; ISBN 978-4-04-115200-3 (limited edition)
19	1 September 2025	978-4-04-116236-1; ISBN 978-4-04-116235-4 (limited edition)
20	1 September 2025	978-4-04-116453-2; ISBN 978-4-04-116456-3 (limited edition)

=== Anime ===
An anime adaptation was announced via a handout included with the reprint of volume one of Shungiku Nakamura's √W.P.B. manga. It is directed by Shinji Ishihira and written by Yoshiko Nakamura, with animation by the animation studio Studio Deen. Miki Takihara is in charge of the series' character designs. The opening theme song is "Okaeri" by Yūsuke Yata and the ending theme is "Happiness YOU&ME" by Kaidō 4 Kyōdai (voice actors of Ren, Haru, Aki, and Shima).

The 10-episode series premiered on 6 April 2016, and was broadcast on Tokyo MX, Sun TV, BS11, Chiba TV, tvk, Mie TV, TVQ Kyushu Broadcasting, Gifu Broadcasting, and TV Saitama.

A 20-minute-long OVA was included with the 10th volume of the manga when it ships on 1 January 2017.

A second season of the anime was announced in the final episode of the first season. It premiered on 12 January 2017. The opening theme song is "Hare-Iro Melody" by Yūsuke Yata, while the ending theme song is "Gyun to Love Song" by Kaidō 4 Kyōdai.

On 14 July 2017, Funimation licensed the series and released it on home video starting 17 October 2017.

== See also ==
- Hakkenden: Eight Dogs of the East, another manga series by the same author
