= Ryōtarō Okiayu =

Japanese voice actor (born 1969)

- 置鮎 龍太郎
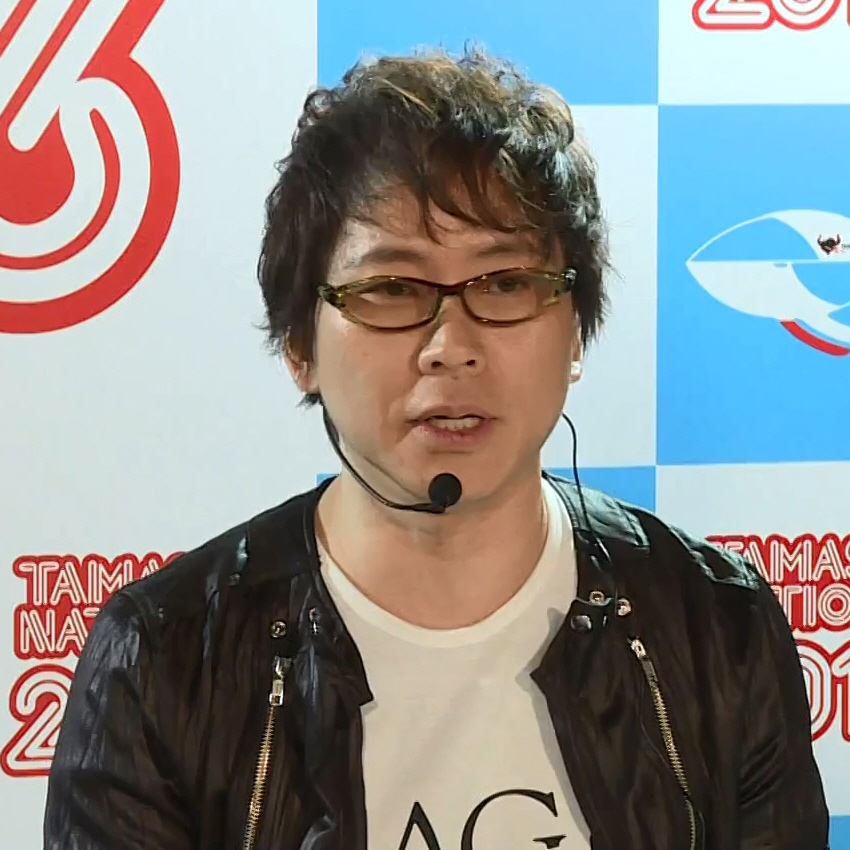
- Okiayu in 2016
- Born: November 17, 1969 (age 56); Kitakyushu, Fukuoka, Japan
- Other names: Ryō (りょうちゃん, Ryō-chan); Okkii (オッキー)
- Occupations: Actor; voice actor; Singer
- Years active: 1989–present
- Agent: Aoni Production
- Notable work: Bleach as Byakuya Kuchiki; New Mobile Report Gundam Wing as Treize Khushrenada; The Prince of Tennis as Kunimitsu Tezuka; Slam Dunk as Hisashi Mitsui; Hell Teacher Nūbē as Meisuke Nueno; Mega Man X as Zero; Fruits Basket as Shigure Sohma; Toriko as Toriko; Tekken as Lee Chaolan; Demon Slayer: Kimetsu no Yaiba as Kokushibo
- Height: 170 cm (5 ft 7 in)
- Spouses: Nao Nagasawa (divorced); Ai Maeda (m. 2013)
- Children: 1

Ryōtarō Okiayu (置鮎 龍太郎, Okiayu Ryōtarō; born November 17, 1969) is a Japanese actor and singer. His major roles include Byakuya Kuchiki in Bleach, Treize Khushrenada in Mobile Suit Gundam Wing, Hisashi Mitsui in Slam Dunk, Meisuke Nueno in Hell Teacher Nūbē, Kunimitsu Tezuka in The Prince of Tennis, Alucard in Castlevania, Zero in Mega Man X, Yuu Matsuura in Marmalade Boy, Shigure Sohma in Fruits Basket, Dark in D.N. Angel, Toriko in Toriko, and Kokushibo in Demon Slayer: Kimetsu no Yaiba. As a singer, he was one of the members for Entertainment Music Unit from 1995 to 2000. He is married to voice actress Ai Maeda. His range is A～E♯ and his dialect is Osakan. His older sister is an animator. He is the official voice-over dub for Scott Foley, Taylor Kitsch, Lin Gengxin and Stephen Fung.

== Biography ==
Okiayu was born in Kitakyushu, Fukuoka Prefecture in 1969, moved to Osaka Prefecture when he was in the third grade of elementary school due to his parents' work, and lived in Nankō Port Town in Suminoe-ku, Osaka. His father had worked at a movie company for a time before Okiayu was born, and he would sometimes get anime posters and cels from his old colleagues. Because of this environment, Okiayu and his sister, who is one year older than him, loved anime and often listened to theatrical anime records and dramas together. His sister was skilled in the field of drawing, having been involved in animation for some time, but Okiayu found more enjoyment in imitating the voices of characters than in drawing, and he came to feel that speaking dialogue was an interesting thing to do. In his first year of high school after entering Abeno High School, he began to think about becoming a voice actor, and began to request information about training schools, but due to financial reasons, he decided to wait until after graduation and began working part-time during his high school years to save money. However, he spent the money on other things, so he ended up borrowing from his parents to attend the training school. His parents advised him to go to college, but he decided to go to the training school because he had no goals in mind. While there were almost no training schools in Osaka at the time, he auditioned and entered the Aoni Juku Osaka School. He passed an audition for Aoni Production through an in-house screening and moved to Tokyo from Osaka. He is said to have cried when he got the acceptance letter. When he first moved to Tokyo, he went to his cousin's place to find a room.

Okiayu claims that his first jobs as a voice actor were a radio commercial for a prep school and the voice of a remote-controlled robot roaming around the Expo '90 site. His first work in anime was as a Bodkin archer in Dragon Quest and his first regular role was as Franz Heinel in Future GPX Cyber Formula. His first starring role was in the OVA Dark Cat. The role of Meisuke Nueno in Hell Teacher Nūbē was his first leading role in a TV anime. He said that Nūbē was the culmination of his career and that he was able to put himself fully into the role and play it naturally because he was close to Meisuke's age, and he said he cried when he heard it was over.

Okiayu has taken over some of the roles from late Kaneto Shiozawa, Kazuyuki Sogabe, Tsuyoshi Takishita, and Unshō Ishizuka. Since 2016, he has also been working as a stage actor in the theater company Hero Hero Q Company. In 2023, Okiayu was a recipient of the Best Supporting Actor Award at the 17th Seiyu Awards.

== Filmography ==
=== Anime ===
List of voice performances in anime
Year	Title	Role	Notes	Source
1988	Legend of the Galactic Heroes	Emil von Seclä	OVA	
1991	Future GPX Cyber Formula series	Franz Heinel		
1992	Super Dimensional Fortress Macross II: Lovers Again	Ingues	OVA	
1993	The Brave Express Might Gaine	Guard Diver, Loose Changer		
1993	Iron Leaguer	Mach Windy		
1993	Please Save My Earth	Issei Nishikiori	OVA	
1994	Brave Police J-Decker	McCrane, Mr. Mudra		
1994	Marmalade Boy	Yuu Matsuura		
1994–96	Slam Dunk	Hisashi Mitsui		
1994	Haō Taikei Ryū Knight	Gratches		
1994	Ginga Sengoku Gun'yūden Rai	Racovian		
1994	Tekkaman Blade II	Darbit Kruger	OVA	
1994	Tenshi Nanka Ja Nai	Shūichi Takigawa	OVA	
1994	Sailor Moon R	Achiral		
1995	Sailor Moon SuperS	Tiger's Eye		
1995	Mobile Suit Gundam Wing	Treize Khushrenada		
1995	El-Hazard	Katsuhiko Jinnai	OVAs & TV series	
1995	Saint Tail	John		
1995	Fire Emblem	Abel	OVA	
1996	Hell Teacher Nūbē	Meisuke Nueno	Also narrated an episode of the live-action drama	
1996	Martian Successor Nadesico	Nagare Akatsuki		
1997	Ninja Resurrection	Shiro Amakusa Tokisada	OVA	
1997	Flame of Recca	Kurei		
1997	Dr. Slump	Dr. Mashirito; Tsukutsun Tsun	2nd TV series	
1998	Android Announcer Maico 2010	Matsuo Densuke		
1998	Weiß Kreuz	Brad Crawford		
1998–99	Sorcerous Stabber Orphen series	Hartia		
1998–99	Dokkiri Doctor	Mitsugu Tajima		
1998	Mamotte Shugogetten	Takashi Nomura	Also OVA in 2000	
1999	Shin Hakkenden	Tomoka		
1999	Jubei-chan: Secret of the Lovely Eyepatch	Koinosuke Odagou	Also special in 2004	
1999	10 Tokyo Warriors	Jingo Kazamatsuri	OVA	
1999	Excel Saga	Watanabe		
2000	Love Hina	Kentaro Sakata		
2000	Legendary Gambler Tetsuya	Tetsuya		
2001	Hare+Guu	Asio		
2001	Sister Princess	Akio Yamagami		
2001	Project ARMS	Keith Black		
2001	Fruits Basket	Shigure Sohma		
2000	Gravitation	Claude (K)		
2001	Cosmic Baton Girl Cometto-san	Omasien man		
2001–2012	The Prince of Tennis series	Kunimitsu Tezuka		
2002	Mirage of Blaze	Oda Nobunaga		
2002–06	Kinnikuman series	Kevin Mask, Mr. Gacha, Puripuriman	Starting with Ultimate Muscle: The Kinnikuman Legacy	
2002	Digimon Frontier	RhodoKnightmon		
2002	Mobile Suit Gundam SEED	Andrew Waltfeld		
2003	Machine Robo Rescue	Koshiro Sasaki, Fire Robo		
2003	D.N.Angel	Dark Mousy		
2003	Fullmetal Alchemist	Scar		
2004	Transformers: Energon	Rodimus Convoy		
2004	Astro Boy	Claus		
2004–05	Girls Bravo series	Kazuharu Fukuyama		
2004	Harukanaru Toki no Naka de Hachiyō Shō	Akram		
2004–11	Ring ni Kakero 1 series	Jun Kenzaki		
2005	Bleach	Byakuya Kuchiki		
2005–07	Onegai My Melody series	Keiichi Hiiragi, My Melody's father		
2005–present	One Piece	Kaku, Kizaru (881-)		
2006	Clannad series	Akio Furukawa	Also After Story	
2006	Gakuen Heaven	Koji Shinomiya		
2006	.hack//Roots	Sagisaka, Seisaku		
2006–07	The Story of Saiunkoku series	Kuro Hong		
2006	Marginal Prince	Joshua Grant		
2006	D.Gray-man	Reever Wenham		
2006	Super Robot Wars Original Generation: Divine Wars	Raidiese F. Branstein		
2006	Happy Lucky Bikkuriman	Gyuujaku-Tenshi, others	2006 TV series	
2007	No Money			
2007	Over Drive	Naoto Hyoudou		
2007	Romeo × Juliet	Tybalt Volumnia De Capulet		
2007	Shining Tears X Wind	Haruto Saionji		
2007	Hatara Kizzu Maihamu Gumi	Keisuke Yoshikawa		
2008	Detective Conan	Subaru Okiya		
2008	Nabari no Ou	Kotaro Fuma		
2008	Junjou Romantica series	Kaoru Asahina		
2009	Akikan!	Hidehoko Otokoya		
2009	Slap-Up Party: Arad Senki	Irbek		
2009	Tatakau Shisho: The Book of Bantorra	Segal		
2010	Sengoku Basara: Samurai Kings II	Toyotomi Hideyoshi		
2011–14	Toriko	Toriko		
2011	Blue Exorcist	Igor Neigaus		
2011–12	Fate/Zero	Berserker		
2011–13	Haganai series	Kashiwazaki Pegasus		
2012–13	Recorder to Randoseru series	Atsushi Miyagawa		
2012	Hyouka	Masashi Tōgaito		
2012	Good Luck Girl!	Genjūrō Rindo		
2013	DD Fist of the North Star	Shin		
2014	Strange+	Masamune		
2014	Date A Live II	Isaac Ray Pelham Westcott		
2014	Love Stage!!	Seiya Sena		
2014	Sengoku Basara: End of Judgement	Toyotomi Hideyoshi		
2014	The Seven Deadly Sins	Helbram		
2014	Cardfight!! Vanguard G	Ryutaro Oyama		
2014	Kenichi: The Mightiest Disciple	Radin Tidat Jihan	OVA 7	
2015	Fafner in the Azure: Exodus	Walter Bargest		
2015	Saint Seiya: Soul of Gold	Gemini Saga		
2015	Kagewani	Masaki Kimura	Eps. 4 – 6, 9, 11 – 13	
2015	Blood Blockade Battlefront	Tonio		
2015	Kuroko's Basketball Season 3	Shūzō Nijimura		
2015	Noragami	Ebisu	Season 2 Aragoto	
2016	Myriad Colors Phantom World	Albrecht	Ep. 6	
2016	Prince of Stride: Alternative	Yuujirou Dan		
2016	Kagewani: Shō	Masaki Kimura	Eps. 2, 4 – 13	
2016–17	Super Lovers	Takamura Shiro		
2016	Izetta: The Last Witch	Hermann		
2016	Idol Memories	Ren Hayami		
2017	Masamune-kun's Revenge	Eiji		
2017	Super Lovers 2	Takamura Shiro		
2017	Star-Myu: High School Star Musical 2	Ritsu Saotome		
2017	Fate/Apocrypha	Lancer of Black/Vlad III		
2017	Clean Freak! Aoyama-kun	Aoyama		
2017	Black Clover	Heath Grice, Gaja		
2018	Ninja Girl & Samurai Master 3rd Season	Kennyo Honganji		
2018	Asobi Asobase	Maeda		
2018	How Not to Summon a Demon Lord	Emile Bichelberger		
2019	Date A Live III	Isaac Ray Pelham Westcott		
2019	7 Seeds	Mansaku Tsunomata		
2019	Actors: Songs Connection	Satsuma Kadonoōji		
2019	Babylon	Kaika Itsuki		
2020	Science Fell in Love, So I Tried to Prove It	Professor Ikeda		
2020	Toilet-Bound Hanako-kun	Kodama/The Confession Tree		
2020	A3!	Reni Kamikizaka		
2020	The Misfit of Demon King Academy	Ivis Necron		
2020	King's Raid: Successors of the Will	Dominicus		
2021	Back Arrow	Kai Rhodan		
2021	Godzilla Singular Point	Bayler "BB" Barn		
2021	Shaman King	Boris Tepes Dracula		
2021	Getter Robo Arc	Emperor Gore III		
2022	Salaryman's Club	Sentaro Ibuki		
2022	Science Fell in Love, So I Tried to Prove It Heart	Professor Ikeda		
2022	Ya Boy Kongming!	Zhuge Kongming		
2022	Date A Live IV	Isaac Ray Pelham Westcott		
2022	The Prince of Tennis II: U-17 World Cup	Kunimitsu Tezuka		
2022	Utawarerumono: Mask of Truth	Raikou		
2022	Bleach: Thousand-Year Blood War	Byakuya Kuchiki		
2022	Me & Roboco	Gachi Gorilla		
2023	Junji Ito Maniac: Japanese Tales of the Macabre	Sonohara		
2023	The Tale of the Outcasts	Commander of the Knights of the Sword Cross		
2023	Run for Money: The Great Mission	Maurice Shoemaker		
2023	Blue Orchestra	Ryūjin Aono		
2023	Demon Slayer: Kimetsu no Yaiba Swordsmith Village Arc	Kokushibo		
2023	Record of Ragnarok II	Hades		
2023	Rurouni Kenshin	Hannya		
2023	Ragna Crimson	Olto Zora		
2023	I'm Giving the Disgraced Noble Lady I Rescued a Crash Course in Naughtiness	Gosetsu		
2024	Sasaki and Peeps	Akutsu		
2024	The Foolish Angel Dances with the Devil	Zwei		
2024	Pokémon Horizons: The Series	Hassaku		
2024	Date A Live V	Isaac Ray Pelham Westcott		
2024	Our Last Crusade or the Rise of a New World Season II	Talisman		
2025	My Happy Marriage	Tadakiyo Kudo	Season 2	
2025	I Want to Escape from Princess Lessons	Neil		
2025	Kowloon Generic Romance	Miyuki Hebinuma		
2025	Hell Teacher: Jigoku Sensei Nube	Meisuke Nueno		
2025	The Fragrant Flower Blooms with Dignity	Keiichiro Tsumugi		
2025	Cat's Eye	Michael Heintz		
2026	Akane-banashi	Shomei Tsubakiya		
2026	Dandivine	Daigo Shijima		

=== Film ===
List of voice performances in anime feature films
Year	Title	Role	Notes	Source
1995	Slam Dunk: Shohoku's Greatest Challenge!	Hisashi Mitsui		
1995	Slam Dunk: Howling Basketman Spirit!!	Hisashi Mitsui		
1998	Rennyo Monogatari	Rennyo (young)		
2001	Gensomaden Saiyuki Requiem: A Requiem for The One Not Chosen	Go Dougan		
2003	Detective Conan: Crossroad in the Ancient Capital	Fumimaro Ayanokoji		
2006	Bleach: Memories of Nobody	Byakuya Kuchiki		
2007	Clannad	Akio Furukawa		
2007	Bleach: The DiamondDust Rebellion	Byakuya Kuchiki		
2008	Bleach: Fade to Black	Byakuya Kuchiki		
2008	The Garden of Sinners: Oblivion Recording	Satsuki Kurogiri		
2010	Bleach: Hell Verse	Byakuya Kuchiki		
2011	Tekken: Blood Vengeance	Lee Chaolan		
2014	Detective Conan: Dimensional Sniper	Subaru Okiya		
2017	Yo-kai Watch Shadowside: Oni-ō no Fukkatsu	Seiryuu		
2020	Fate/Grand Order: Camelot – Wandering; Agaterám	Lancelot		
2021	Detective Conan: The Scarlet Bullet	Subaru Okiya		
2024	Nintama Rantarō: Invincible Master of the Dokutake Ninja	Zenpōji Isaku		
2025	Demon Slayer: Kimetsu no Yaiba – The Movie: Infinity Castle	Kokushibo		

=== Tokusatsu ===
Year	Title	Role	Notes	Source
2001	Mirai Sentai Timeranger	Computer Engineer Gate	Ep. 46	
2005	Mahou Sentai Magiranger	Hades Warrior God Cyclops	Eps. 35 – 38	
2015	Shuriken Sentai Ninninger	Mangetsu Kibaoni	Eps. 39 – 42	
2016	Come Back! Shuriken Sentai Ninninger: Ninnin Girls vs. Boys FINAL WARS	Mangetsu Kibaoni	OV	
2018	Kaitou Sentai Lupinranger VS Keisatsu Sentai Patranger	Narrow Kilmer	Ep. 18	
2023	Kamen Rider Gotchard	Dreadriver (voice), Gigist (voice), Eldoradriver (voice)	Eps. 12–50	

=== Other live-action ===
Year	Title	Role	Notes	Source
2021	Reach Beyond the Blue Sky	Ōgimachisanjō Sanenaru	Episode 19; Taiga drama	
2024	Saint Young Men: The Movie	Additional Warrior Red (voice)	Film	

=== Audio dramas ===
List of voice performances in audio dramas
Title	Role	Notes	Source
7 Seeds	Mansaku Tsunomata	Drama CD	
Sengoku basara 2: Hyakkaryōran! Odawaranoeki	Hideyoshi Toyotomi	Drama CD	
Legend of Chun Hyang	Mong Ryong	Drama CD	
Paradox Live	Baek Chungsung		

=== Video games ===
List of voice performances in video games
Year	Title	Role	Notes	Source
1994	Gunbird	Ash	Arcade	
1995	Voltage Fighter Gowcaizer	Kyosuke Shigure, Fudohmaru		
1995	Cho Aniki: Kyuukyoku Muteki Ginga Saikyou Otoko	Idaten	PS1	
1996	Mega Man 8	Proto Man	PS1, Sega Saturn	
1997	Rival Schools: United by Fate	Roy Bromwell	Arcade, PS1	
1997	Castlevania: Symphony of the Night	Alucard	PS1, Sega Saturn	
1997	Mega Man: Battle & Chase	Proto Man	PS1	
1997	Mega Man X4	Zero	PS1, Sega Saturn	
1997	Silhouette Mirage	Hal Birthclod		
1997	Tales of Destiny	Dymlos, Kronos		
1998	Xenogears	Krelian		
1998	Double Cast ダブルキャスト	Yoshiki Sakuma	PS1	
1998	Lunar 2: Eternal Blue	Ronfar		
2000	Skies of Arcadia	Alfonso	Dreamcast	
2000	Mega Man X5	Zero	PS1	
2000	Project Justice	Roy Bromwell	Arcade, Dreamcast	
2001	Segagaga	Programmer Oka, Shrimp, Secret Director Cool	Dreamcast	2000 WinBack Daniel Stewart
2001	Everybody's Golf 3	Satoru	PS1	
2001	Metal Gear Solid 2: Sons of Liberty	Vamp	PS2	
2001	Mega Man X6	Zero	PS1	
2003	Mega Man X7	Zero	PS2	
2004	Mega Man X8	Zero	PS2	
2004	Bakumatsu Koihana-Shinsengumi ja:幕末恋華 新選組	Toshizo Hijikata	PS2	
2005	Shining Force Neo	Barron	PS2	
2005	Harukanaru Toki no Naka de Hachiyō Shō	Akram	PS2	
2005	Namco × Capcom	Captain Commando, Taira No Kagekiyo	PS2	
2005	Mega Man Maverick Hunter X	Zero	PSP	
2005	Kingdom Hearts II	Setzer Gabbiani	PS2	
2006	Dirge of Cerberus: Final Fantasy VII	Nero		
2006	Enchanted Arms	Toya		
2006	Clannad	Akio Furukawa	PS2	
2006	Sengoku Basara 2	Hideyoshi Toyotomi	PS2	
2006	Chaos Wars	Lyell	PS2	
2007	Warriors Orochi series	Orochi	PS2	
2008	Super Robot Wars OG Saga: Endless Frontier	Katze Kotolnos, Rubor Cucullus		
2008	Hana Yori Dango: Koi Seyo Otome!	Sojirou Nishikado	DS	
2008	GetAmped2	L.J.	Windows	
2009	Yakuza 3	Shoyo Toma		
2010	Kingdom Hearts Birth by Sleep	Terra	PSP	
2010	Tatsunoko vs. Capcom: Ultimate All-Stars	Zero		
2010	Castlevania: Harmony of Despair	Alucard		
2010	Marvel vs. Capcom 3: Fate of Two Worlds	Zero		
2011–14	Dynasty Warriors series	Sima Shi, Sima Yi	Starting with Dynasty Warriors 7, replaces Tsuyoshi Takishita as Sima Yi starting with Dynasty Warriors 8 Empires	
2011	Tales of Xillia	Gaius	PS3	
2011	Final Fantasy Type-0	Quon Yobatz		
2011	Ultimate Marvel vs. Capcom 3	Zero		
2012	Kingdom Hearts 3D: Dream Drop Distance	Terra	3DS	
2012	Project X Zone	Zero	3DS	
2013	MapleStory	Black Mage / White Mage	PC	
2014	CV: Casting Voice	Chris Shinotani	PS3	
2015	Xenoblade Chronicles X	Ru		
2015	Project X Zone 2	Zero, Captain Commando	3DS	
2015	Fate/Grand Order	Gaius Julius Caesar, Romulus, Phantom of the Opera, Lancelot, Vlad III. Romulus-Quirinus	Android/iOS	
2016	Bungo and Alchemist	Nagai Kafū	PC	
2016	Star Ocean: Integrity and Faithlessness	Daril Camuze, Aaron		
2017	Kingdom Hearts HD 2.8 Final Chapter Prologue	Terra	PS4, Xbox One, Windows	
2017	Tekken 7	Lee Chaolan		
2017	Another Eden	Guildna	Android/iOS	
2018	Super Smash Bros. Ultimate	Zero, Alucard, Mii Fighters (Type 5)	Nintendo Switch	
2019	Kingdom Hearts III	Terra	PS4, Xbox One, Windows	
2019	Bloodstained: Ritual of the Night	Orlok Dracule	Windows, PS4, Xbox One, Nintendo Switch	
2019	Pachi-Slot Tekken 4	Lee Chaolan	Pachislot	
2019	Oninaki	Gavod		
2020	Space Channel 5 VR: Kinda Funky News Flash!	Glitter	PS4	
2020	Teppen	Zero	Android/iOS	
2020	Mega Man X DiVE	Zero	Android/iOS	
2021	Arena of Valor	Byakuya Kuchiki (skin)	Android/iOS	
2021	Final Fantasy VII Remake: Intergrade	Nero		
2022	The 13th Month	Black Prince		
2022	Crisis Core: Final Fantasy VII Reunion	Nero		
2024	Tekken 8	Lee Chaolan		
2024	Final Fantasy VII Rebirth	Nero		
2027	Persona 4 Revival	Ryotaro Dojima		

== Dubbing roles ==
List of dub performances in overseas television and film productions
Title	Role	Voice dub for, Notes	Source
Dawson's Creek	Cliff	Scott Foley	
Felicity	Noel	Scott Foley	
Scream 3	Roman Bridger	Scott Foley	
The Unit	Bob Brown	Scott Foley	
Whiskey Cavalier	FBI Special Agent Will Chase	Scott Foley	
Alien: Covenant	Chris Oram	Billy Crudup	
American Heist	Frankie Kelly	Adrien Brody	
Barbie	Stereotypical Ken	Scott Evans	
Battleship	Alex Hopper	Taylor Kitsch	
Black & White: The Dawn of Justice	Chen Zhen	Lin Gengxin	
Crooked Arrows	Joe Logan	Brandon Routh	
Deadpool & Wolverine	Mr. Paradox	Matthew Macfadyen	
Detective Dee: The Four Heavenly Kings	Shatuo Zhong	Lin Gengxin	
Expend4bles	Suarto Rahmat	Iko Uwais	
Final Destination 3	Kevin Fischer	Ryan Merriman	
Flyboys	Blaine Rawlings	James Franco	
Gods and Monsters	Clayton	Brendan Fraser	
Guernica	Vasyl	Jack Davenport	
Hellboy	John Thaddeus Myers	Rupert Evans	
In the Heart of the Sea	George Pollard Jr.	Benjamin Walker	
Ladder 49	Ray Gauquin	Balthazar Getty	
Lone Survivor	Michael P. Murphy	Taylor Kitsch	
Mare of Easttown	Detective Colin Zabel	Evan Peters	
Melrose Place	Jeff		
Monrak Transistor	Kiattisak	Ackarat Nitipol	
Nick of Time	Gene Watson	Johnny Depp	
Predators	Edwin	Topher Grace	
Remember the Titans	Ronnie Bass	Kip Pardue	
Step Brothers	Derek Huff	Adam Scott	
Tai Chi 0	Nan	Stephen Fung	
Tai Chi Hero	Nan	Stephen Fung	
The Taking of Tiger Mountain	Shao Jianbo (Captain 203)	Lin Gengxin	
The Covenant	Caleb	Steven Strait	
The Time Machine	Vox 114	Orlando Jones	
To Die For	Jimmy Emmett	Joaquin Phoenix	
Young Detective Dee: Rise of the Sea Dragon	Shatuo Zhong	Lin Gengxin	

Animation
Title	Role	Notes	Source
Castlevania	Trevor Belmont		
Delgo	Delgo		
Devil May Cry	White Rabbit		
Ferdinand	Ferdinand		
Thomas & Friends	Fergus, and Rheneas	Season 4–7	

== Other roles ==
List of voice roles in other productions
Title	Role	Notes	Source
Miracle Train ~Chūō-sen e Yōkoso~	Shintarō Shinjuku	Train line character	
