= Junko Minagawa =

Japanese voice actress

- 皆川 純子
- Born: Ibaraki Prefecture, Japan
- Occupation: Voice actress
- Years active: 2001–present
- Agent: Haikyo

Junko Minagawa (皆川 純子, Minagawa Junko) is a Japanese voice actress affiliated with Haikyo. Her best-known role is Ryoma Echizen, the titular character in The Prince of Tennis anime series. She sang some of the show's theme songs, insert songs, and character singles, some of which have charted in Oricon's single rankings. Other major roles include Ayaka Yukihiro in the Negima series, Akira in Aria, Cao Chun Yan in Fighting Beauty Wulong, Cornelia Li Britannia in Code Geass, Khamsin in Shakugan no Shana, Yoshitaka Nakabayashi in He Is My Master, Sailor Uranus in Sailor Moon Crystal, Mereoleona Vermillion in Black Clover, and Yun in Yona of the Dawn.

== Filmography ==
=== Animation ===
List of voice performances in animation
Year	Series	Role	Notes	Source
2001–2012	The Prince of Tennis	Ryoma Echizen		
2002–2009	Atashin'chi	Yamada	Also on Shin Atashin'chi	
2002–2010	Duel Masters series	Hakuoh		
2003	.hack//Legend of the Twilight	Shugo Kunisaki		
2003	The World of Narue	Kanaka Nanase		
2003	Croket!	Wiener		
2003	Godannar	Shinobu Saruwatari		
2003	Uninhabited Planet Survive!	Shingo		
2003	Requiem from the Darkness	Yanagi Onna		
2003	Full-Blast Science Adventure – So That's How It Is	Yukio		
2004	Chrono Crusade	Joshua Christopher		
2004	Mermaid Melody Pichi Pichi Pitch	Mikeru		
2004	Daphne in the Brilliant Blue			
2004	Space Symphony Maetel	Oriba		
2004	Fantastic Children	Thomas, Soran (10 years old)		
2005	Negima!: Magister Negi Magi	Ayaka Yukihiro		
2005	Jinki: Extend	Mel J. Vanette		
2005	Trinity Blood	Ion Fortuna		
2005	Loveless (manga)	Ritsuka Aoyagi		
2005	Fushigiboshi no Futagohime	Eclipse		
2005	He Is My Master	Yoshitaka Nakabayashi		
2005	Strawberry Marshmallow	Sasatsuka, Ana's mother		
2005–2008	Aria series	Akira E. Ferrari		
2006	Fighting Beauty Wulong	Xiao Chun Yan		
2006	Black Cat	Leon Elliott, Silphy		
2006	Tactical Roar	Kanshu Shimabara		
2006	Shakugan no Shana series	Khamsin Nbh'w		
2006	Saru Get You -On Air-	Hiroki		
2006	Tsubasa: Reservoir Chronicle	Ryuuou		
2006	Fighting Beauty Wulong	Soshunyo		
2006	Negima!?	Ayaka Yukihiro		
2006	Strain: Strategic Armored Infantry	Melchisedec		
2006	Shōnen Onmyōji	Genbu		
2006	Kenichi: The Mightiest Disciple	Kaoru Shiratori		
2006	Code Geass	Cornelia Li Britannia		
2007	Bokurano	Jun Ushiro		
2007	Treasure Guest	Hanto		
2007	Sakura Wars: New York NY	Sagitta Weinberg		
2008	Tytania	Miranda Casimir		
2009	Pandora Hearts	Oz Vessalius		
2009	Basquash!	Slash Keenz		
2009	Jewelpet	Domajo, Kohaku		
2009	A Certain Scientific Railgun	Kounoe Haruki		
2010	Digimon Fusion	Riborumon		
2012	Battle Spirits: Sword Eyes	Tsurugi Tatewaki		
2013	Arata: The Legend	Kanate		
2013	Hyperdimension Neptunia the Animation	Underling		
2014	Yona of the Dawn	Yun		
2015	Yo-kai Watch	Fumika's mother		
2016	Super Lovers	Ren Kaidou		
2016	Pretty Guardian Sailor Moon Crystal Season III	Haruka Tenoh/Sailor Uranus	Death Busters arc	
2016	Drifters	Jeanne d'Arc		
2016	Magic⭐Kyun! Renaissance	Juri Chikamatsu		
2017	ID-0	Amanza Volchkova		
2017	Kirakira Pretty Cure a la Mode	Julio/Pikario		
2017	Katsugeki/Touken Ranbu	Saniwa		
2017	Land of the Lustrous	Yellow Diamond		
2017	Super Lovers 2	Ren Kaidou		
2017	Duel Masters (2017)	Hakuoh		
2019	Black Clover	Mereoleona Vermillion		
2019	7 Seeds	Nijiko		
2019	Kemono Michi: Rise Up	Kobold wife		
2021	Duel Masters King!	Hakuoh		
2022	Ninjala	Jane		
2022	The Prince of Tennis II: U-17 World Cup	Ryoma Echizen		
2022	Akiba Maid War	Nagi		
2024	The Witch and the Beast	Kiera Haines		

=== Anime film ===
List of voice performances in film
Year	Series	Role	Notes	Source
2003	Crayon Shin-chan: Arashi o Yobu Eikō no Yakiniku Road	Amagi		
2005	The Prince of Tennis: Two Samurais, The First Game	Ryoma Echizen		
2005	The Prince of Tennis: A Gift from Atobe	Ryoma Echizen		
2005	Duel Masters: Curse of the Death Phoenix	Hakuoh		
2007	Sword of the Stranger	Mu-You (Mokuryū)		
2009	Duel Masters: Lunatic God Saga	Hakuoh		
2009	Naruto Shippuden the Movie: The Will of Fire	Ni		
2011	The Prince of Tennis: Eikoku-shiki Teikyū-jō Kessen!	Ryoma Echizen		
2012	Resident Evil: Damnation	Ada Wong		
2017	Kirakira Pretty Cure a la Mode the Movie: Crisply! The Memory of Mille-feuille!	Pikario		
2017–2018	Code Geass Lelouch of the Rebellion	Cornelia li Britannia	3-part compilation film of the anime television series New dialogues recorded	
2019	Code Geass Lelouch of the Re;surrection	Cornelia li Britannia		
2019	Doraemon: Nobita's Chronicle of the Moon Exploration	Luca		
2021	Pretty Guardian Sailor Moon Eternal The Movie	Haruka Tenoh / Super Sailor Uranus	2-Part Film, Season 4 of Sailor Moon Crystal (Dead Moon arc)	
2023	Pretty Guardian Sailor Moon Cosmos The Movie	Haruka Tenoh / Eternal Sailor Uranus	2-Part Film, Season 5 of Sailor Moon Crystal (Shadow Galactica arc)	
2024	Code Geass: Rozé of the Recapture	Cornelia li Britannia	Four-part film series	

=== OVA ===
- Code Geass: Akito the Exiled (2012), Shin Hyuuga (young)
- Akatsuki no Yona: Sono se Niwa (2015), Yun
- Pandora Hearts: Oz Vessalius (2009-2010)

=== Vomic ===
- World Trigger (2014), Yūma Kuga

=== Video games ===
List of voice performances in video games
Year	Series	Role	Notes	Source
2001	Tokimeki Memorial 3: Yakusoku no Ano Basho de	Serika Shinjo	PS2	
2004	Remember 11: The Age of Infinity	Yuni Kusuda	PS2	
2005	Nana	Nana Osaki	PS2	
2005	Romancing SaGa	Constance, Schiele, Schirach		
2005	Sakura Wars: So Long, My Love	Sagiitta Weinberg		
2005	Fatal Frame III: The Tormented	Rei Kurosawa, Reika Kuze	PS2	
2005	Dead or Alive 4	Eliot		
2006	Fighting Beauty Wulong	Xiao Chun-yan	PS2	
2007	Eternal Sonata	Waltz		
2008	Fushigi Yūgi: Suzaku Ibun	Nuriko	PS2	
2008	Tales of Hearts	Incarose		
	Mahou Sensei Negima 1Jikanme	Ayaka Yukihiro	PS2	
2010	The Legend of Heroes: Trails from Zero	Wazy Hemisphere	PSP, PS Vita, PS4, PC, Switch	
2011	Catherine	Erica Anderson, Rue Ishida, Astaroth	Also Full Body	
2011	El Shaddai: Ascension of the Metatron	Ishtar		
2011	Dead or Alive: Dimensions	Eliot		
2011	Shin Megami Tensei: Devil Survivor Overclocked	Yoshino Haruzawa		
2011	The Legend of Heroes: Trails to Azure	Wazy Hemisphere	PSP, PS Vita, PS4, PC, Switch	
2012	Kid Icarus: Uprising	Dark Lord Gaol		
2012	Dead or Alive 5	Eliot		
2013	Resident Evil 6	Ada Wong		
2014	Bayonetta 2	Loki		
2015	Project X Zone 2	Ada Wong	3DS	
2016	Guilty Gear Xrd -Revelator-	Ariels (non-playable guest)	PS3, PS4	
2016	The Legend of Heroes: Trails at Sunrise	Wazy Hemisphere	Web Browser, PS Vita, PS4, Android, iOS, Switch	
2016	Magic⭐Kyun! Renaissance	Juri Chikamatsu	PS Vita	
2017	Captain Tsubasa: Dream Team	Alfredo Di Piazzolla	Android, iOS	
2019	Resident Evil 2	Ada Wong		
2019	Dead or Alive 6	Eliot		
2019	Arknights	Catapult, Bison		
2020	The Legend of Heroes: Trails into Reverie	Wazy Hemisphere	PS4, PS5, PC, Switch	
2020	World's End Club	Tattsun	iOS, Switch	
2020	Genshin Impact	Xingqiu	Android, iOS, PC, PS4, Switch	
2021	Teppen	Ada Wong	Android, iOS	
2022	Monochrome Mobius: Rights and Wrongs Forgotten	Murasame	PC, PS4, PS5	
2023	Resident Evil 4	Ada Wong		

=== Overseas dubbing ===
List of voice dub performances in overseas productions (live-action)
Series	Role	Voice dub for	Notes	Source
Alcatraz	Rebecca Madsen	Sarah Jones		
All We Had	Rita Carmichael	Katie Holmes		
The Assassination of Gianni Versace: American Crime Story	Donatella Versace	Penélope Cruz		
Black Panther	Nakia	Lupita Nyong'o		
Black Panther: Wakanda Forever	Nakia	Lupita Nyong'o		
Blue Crush	Eden	Michelle Rodriguez		
CSI: Crime Scene Investigation	Riley	Lauren Lee Smith	Season 9	
Deadpool 2	Russell Collins / Firefist	Julian Dennison		
Doctor Sleep	Rose the Hat	Rebecca Ferguson		
Dune	Lady Jessica	Rebecca Ferguson		
Dune: Part Two	Lady Jessica	Rebecca Ferguson		
The First Lady	Michelle Obama	Viola Davis		
Frank Herbert's Dune	Princess Irulan	Julie Cox		
Lie to Me	Ria Torres	Monica Raymund		
Mare of Easttown	Marianne "Mare" Sheehan	Kate Winslet		
Meadowland	Sarah	Olivia Wilde		
The Mountain Between Us	Alex Martin	Kate Winslet		
The Originals	Camille O'Connell	Leah Pipes		
The Pembrokeshire Murders	Detective Inspector Ella Richards	Alexandria Riley		
Predators	Isabelle	Alice Braga		
Safe House	DCI Jane Burr	Sunetra Sarker		
Scandal	Olivia Pope	Kerry Washington		

List of voice dub performances in overseas productions (animation)
Series	Role	Notes	Source
Hey Arnold!: The Movie	Arnold		
PAW Patrol: The Movie	Kendra Wilson		

== Discography ==
=== Drama CD ===
List of voice performances in drama CDs
Series	Role	Notes	Source
Almighty X 10			
Anime Store Manager B			
Aria series	Akira		
Ashitahe Strike			
Code Geass			
Fookies			
Godannar			
Hayate X Blade	Mikado Akira		
Jinki: Akaban			
Kamiyomi			
Kimi to Boku	Yuki		
Korega Watashino Goshujin-sama			
Loveless			
Negima			
Pandora Hearts	Oz Vessalius		
Pearls of Mermaid			
Remember 11			
Rosen Kreuz Albion Knight			
Sakura Wars			
Shakugan no Shana			
Shonen Onmyoji series			
Sword World Heppoko Boukentai			
Vie Durant			
The World of Narue			

=== Other recordings ===
- Minna Genki by Junko Minagawa, Ryo Hirohashi and Friends

=== Singles ===
No.	Release date	Title	Catalog No.	Peak position
1st	June 4, 2003	"Say Hello"	KICM-1072	
2nd	April 21, 2004	"Truth/Darkness of chaos"	KICM-1104	–
3rd	January 26, 2005	"Endless way"	KICM-1128	
4th	February 22, 2006	"Deja Vu"	KICM-1160	129
5th	January 24, 2007	"Shout It Loud"	KICM-1193	115
6th	March 14, 2008	"Forever & Ever"	DAKYAMS-1	

==== Character singles ====
Release date	Title	Catalog No.	Peak position
March 30, 2016	"Anata ni" あなたに by Ryoma Echizen	NECM-10235	58
April 8, 2015	"Yakusoku Now & Forever" 約束-now and forever- by Ryoma Echizen	NECM-10222	45
April 30, 2008	"Ichigan (2008 version)" Ichigan ~2008バージョン～ by Ryoma Echizen	NECM-10105	52
May 9, 2012	"Still" by Ryoma Echizen	NECM-10178	42
August 6, 2008	"Across My Line" by Ryoma Echizen	NECM-10110	61
May 1, 2003	"future/White line C" by Ryoma Echizen	NECM-10002	
September 26, 2007	"Wonder Land" by Ryoma Echizen	NECM-10075	45
December 16, 2006	"Everything" by Ryoma Echizen	NECM-10056	49
August 18, 2004	"Minna Kokoni Ita ~2004.8.18 live memorial version~" ミンナココニイタ-2004.8.18 ライヴメモリアルヴァージョン-" by Ryoma Echizen	NECM-10013	
April 28, 2004	"Dreaming on the Radio" by Ryoma Echizen	NECM-10004	
July 3, 2002	"Rising ~The Best of Seigaku Players~ by Ryoma Echizen (Junko Minagawa)	NECM-11001	
September 23, 2004	"Negima! Mahora Academy Middle School 2-A December: Ayaka Yukihiro "ネギま!麻帆良学園中等部2-A 12月:雪広あやか" by Ayaka Yukihiro (Junko Minagawa)	KICM-3057	
July 27, 2009	"Swear to..." by Oz Vessalius (Junko Minagawa)		

=== Albums ===
No.	Release date	Title	Catalog No.	Peak position
1st	August 23, 2003	Future of Blue	KICA-1303	
2nd	April 27, 2005	Aikotoba アイコトバ	KICA-1363	–
3rd	May 10, 2007	Vitamin J ビタミンJ	YAMA-0001	280
4th	November 22, 2007	My Journey	YAMA-0002	

==== Character albums ====
Release date	Title	Catalog No.	Peak position
March 5, 2003	Cool E by Ryoma Echizen	NECA-30080	
July 7, 2004	SR by Ryoma Echizen	NECA-50001/2	
December 24, 2005	Progress by Ryoma Echizen	NECA-20021	55
May 13, 2009	J by Ryoma Echizen	NECA-30246	62
December 24, 2012	Ryoma by Ryoma Echizen	NECA-30294	93

==== Compilation albums ====
Release date	Title	Catalog No.	Peak position
January 24, 2008	Minagawa Junko no Vitamin R+ Vol. 1	DAKYAMA-5	
January 24, 2008	Minagawa Junko no Vitamin R+ Vol. 2	DAKYAMA-6	
January 24, 2008	Minagawa Junko no Vitamin R+ Vol. 3	DAKYAMA-7	
