= Takayuki Hamana =

Japanese animator and director (born 1967)

- 浜名 孝行
- Born: November 3, 1967 (age 58)
- Occupations: Anime director, animator
- Known for: The Prince of Tennis

Japanese name
- Kanji: 浜名 孝行
- Hiragana: はまな たかゆき
- Romanization: Hamana Takayuki

Takayuki Hamana (浜名 孝行, Hamana Takayuki; born November 3, 1967) is a Japanese anime director and animator known for directing The Prince of Tennis.

== Career ==
Upon graduating high school, Takayuki Hamana joined Ajia-do as an in-between animator for four years. Hamana left Ajia-do and joined I.G Tatsunoko, where he became a key animator for various project such as Blue Seed (1994) and Jin-Roh (2000). His experience in storyboarding and directing an episode of Crayon Shin-chan became the "starting point" for his path to become a director. He made his series directing debut in 2001 with The Prince of Tennis and his film directing debut with The Prince of Tennis: Futari no Samurai (2005).

== Works ==
=== Television series ===
- Appleseed XIII: Director
- Arte: Director
- Hakkenden: Legend of the Dog Warriors: Key Animation (ep 10)
- Idaten Jump: Director
- Jin-Roh: The Wolf Brigade: Key Animation
- Library War: Director, Storyboard (ep 1), Episode Director (ep 1)
- Magical Girl Lyrical Nanoha Exceeds Gun Blaze Vengeance: Director
- Moshidora: Director
- Mushibugyo: Director, Episode Director (eps 1, 13)
- Power of Hope: PreCure Full Bloom: Series Director
- Sisters of Wellber: Director
- Sisters of Wellber Zwei: Director
- Sorcerous Stabber Orphen (2020): Director
- Sorcerous Stabber Orphen: Battle of Kimluck: Director
- Sorcerous Stabber Orphen: Chaos in Urbanrama: Director
- The Beast Player Erin: Director
- The Prince of Tennis: Director, Storyboard
- The Villainess Is Adored by the Prince of the Neighbor Kingdom: Director
- The Witch and the Beast: Director, Episode Storyboard (eps 1, 6, 12)
- Vampiyan Kids: Key Animation (pilot)
- Witchy Pretty Cure!! Mirai Days: Series Director

=== Films ===
- Chocolate Underground: Director
- Magical Girl Lyrical Nanoha Detonation: Director
- Magical Girl Lyrical Nanoha Reflection: Director
- Rakudai Majo: Director
- The Prince of Tennis: Atobe Kara no Okurimono: Director, Storyboard, Key Animation
- The Prince of Tennis: Futari no Samurai: Director, Storyboard, Unit Director
- The Seven Deadly Sins: Cursed by Light: Director
