= Ryoma Echizen =

Fictional character from The Prince of Tennis

- The Prince of Tennis character
- Created by: Takeshi Konomi
- Portrayed by: Kanata Hongō
- Voiced by: Japanese; Junko Minagawa; English; David Neil Black (Viz Media dub); Ry McKeand (Crunchyroll dub)

In-universe information
- Nicknames: Prince of Tennis; Samurai Jr.
- Relatives: Nanjiro Echizen (father); Rinko Echizen (mother); Ryoga Echizen (paternal half brother); Nanako Echizen (cousin)
- Nationality: Japanese
- School: Seishun Academy
- Style: All-Rounder Left-handed, Ambidextrous

Ryoma Echizen (Japanese: 越前 リョーマ, Hepburn: Echizen Ryōma) is a fictional character and the protagonist of the manga and anime series The Prince of Tennis created by Takeshi Konomi. In the series, Ryoma is portrayed as a twelve-year-old tennis prodigy who won four consecutive Junior Tennis Tournaments in America. His father is Nanjiro Echizen, a former tennis pro nicknamed "Samurai Nanjiro". At his father's request, Ryoma returns to Japan in order to attend Seishun Academy ("Seigaku"), a private middle school famous for its tennis team. Due to his cocky attitude, he constantly butts heads with some of his upperclassmen as well as angering most of his opponents in tennis matches. Still, he and his team evolve as tennis players to win the National Tennis Tournament. Throughout the story, Ryoma continues to find his own style of tennis by creating original techniques instead of merely being a copy of his father. Ryoma also appears in other media adaptations of the series, including musicals, video games, soundtracks, and films.

Ryoma has been fairly popular among readers, having always stayed in the top four most popular characters, even placing first in two of the polls. Also, Ryoma's character has been featured in more soundtracks than any other character in the series. His likeness has appeared in numerous types of other merchandise as well, including key chains and clothing. However, in publicized reviews for the anime and manga, his character has received mixed reviews, with his personality being heavily criticized. Reviewers from Anime News Network and DVDTalk both found Ryoma's cocky and "arrogant" attitude difficult to like. Though they both find his tennis skills undeniable, they comment on how that makes it "difficult for the reader to latch on and share in his experiences," eliminating the tension that comes with underdog appeal. The ANN reviewer, however, believes that some of the highlights of the series are the numerous ways that Ryoma defeats his opponents. On the other hand, Mania comments that Ryoma does not come off as too "over the top or too serious, but just the right level to be intimidating." And Jeffrey Harris of IGN cites that though Ryoma starts off as "stiff and cold," he slowly starts to break out of his shell.

== Reception ==
According to every Shonen Jump character popularity poll of series, Ryoma has been fairly popular among readers; he won both the first and third popularity polls. He ranked second in the second poll and third in the fourth popularity poll. Also, since Ryoma is the main character of the series, he has been featured on more soundtracks than any other character, with some featuring only him. Numerous types of other merchandise have been released in his likeness, including key chains, clothing, and mugs. NTT customers voted him as their 15th favorite black-haired male anime character.

In publications focused on manga and anime reviews, Ryoma's character has received both positive and negative remarks, though his personality is largely criticized. In Anime News Network's review of the series's first manga volume, they comment on how his skills don't "leave much room for improvement,...making it difficult for the reader to latch on and share in his experiences," and that his character "comes across as dull, cold and untouchable." However, they remark that the highlights of the volume are the "numerous methods Ryoma takes to make his opponents eat their words on the tennis court." When a reviewer from the same site reviewed the first DVD volume, he had a similar response regarding Ryoma's skills, in that it eliminates underdog appeal, and describes Ryoma as "terse, reserved, and arrogant, which makes him difficult to like." John Sinott of DVD Talk echoes the same sentiments regarding Ryoma's personality, seeing him as cocky and unlikable despite having the talent to back up his attitude. His review of the next two DVD volumes went on to describe how Ryoma's impossible tennis moves hindered his ability to enjoy the show, and Park Cooper of MangaLife was similarly surprised at the character's unnatural abilities. Chris Beveridge of Mania, however, sees Ryoma as one who does not come off as "over the top or too serious," yet still cites the character's "serious level of confidence," and also comments on how "Ryoma's nature as someone who has seen a good bit of the world comes into play nicely at times." Though Jeffrey Harris of IGN also sees Ryoma as a "fairly stiff and cold character," he believes that the character begins to warm up to his teammates and is "slowly breaking out of his shell." Jian DeLeon of Complex magazine named him nineteenth on a list of "The 25 Most Stylish Anime Characters."

In the book Manga: An Anthology of Global and Cultural Perspectives, Ryoma is compared to Slam Dunk protagonist Hanamichi Sakuragi as both are unconventional sport manga characters who are initially not interested in the sport but instead in showing off their skills.
