= Takeshi Konomi =

Japanese manga artist (born 1970)

- Born: June 26, 1970 (age 56); Toyonaka, Osaka, Japan
- Occupation: Manga artist
- Known for: The Prince of Tennis

Takeshi Konomi (許斐 剛, Konomi Takeshi; born June 26, 1970) is a Japanese manga artist, known for creating the manga series The Prince of Tennis.

On February 25, 2023, it was reported Konomi is unable to walk and has to use a wheelchair. As of June 2023, Konomi seems to have recovered as he states he was able to attend Tenipuri Festa from the audience and posts a photo of him standing without assistance.

== Financial standing ==
Every year the National Tax Agency releases a list of the highest income tax payers for entertainers in Japan. The higher someone's income tax, the higher their actual presumed earnings; however it is possible for a person to have paid more taxes than another person who made more money. Takeshi Konomi placed number nine on this list in 2002. On January 15, 2014, Takeshi announced that he would return to Shueisha's Weekly Shōnen Jump magazine.

== Works ==
- The Prince of Tennis, a manga about tennis and at one time the most popular sports manga in Japan (July 1999 – March 2008)
- The Prince of After School, a spin-off of The Prince of Tennis (November 2008 – present)
- The Prince of Tennis II, a continuation of The Prince of Tennis (March 2009 – August 2026)
- Cool -Rental Body Guard-
- Moon Walker, a one-shot manga
