= The Prince of Tennis =

Japanese manga series and its adaptations

- First tankōbon volume cover, featuring Ryoma Echizen

テニスの王子様 (Tenisu no Ōjisama)
- Genre: Coming-of-age; Drama; Sports
- Manga
- Written by: Takeshi Konomi
- Published by: Shueisha
- English publisher: NA: Viz Media
- Imprint: Jump Comics
- Magazine: Weekly Shōnen Jump
- Original run: July 6, 1999 – March 3, 2008
- Volumes: 42
Further information
Anime television series
Directed by	Takayuki Hamana
Written by	Masashi Sogo (1–75); Atsuhiro Tomioka (76–101); Atsushi Maekawa (102–178)
Music by	Cher Watanabe
Studio	Trans Arts
Licensed by	Crunchyroll: NA: Viz Media (former)
Original network	TXN (TV Tokyo)
English network	SEA: Animax Asia; US: Toonami Jetstream, Cartoon Network
Original run	October 10, 2001 – March 30, 2005
Episodes	178
Original video animation
A Day on Survival Mountain
Directed by	Takayuki Hamana
Produced by	Atsuo Sugiyama; Tomoko Takahashi
Written by	Masashi Sogo
Music by	Cher Watanabe
Studio	Trans Arts
Licensed by	Crunchyroll
Released	2003
Runtime	35 minutes
Anime film
Atobe's Gift
Directed by	Takayuki Hamana
Produced by	Susumu Matsuyama; Tomoko Takahashi; Toru Kawaguchi; Toshiaki Morita
Music by	Cher Watanabe
Studio	Trans Arts
Licensed by	Crunchyroll
Released	January 29, 2005
Runtime	30 minutes
Original video animation
The National Tournament
Directed by	Shunsuke Tada
Written by	Atsuhiro Tomioka
Music by	Cher Watanabe
Studio	M.S.C
Licensed by	Crunchyroll
Released	March 24, 2006 – January 23, 2009
Runtime	23 minutes
Episodes	26
Manga
The Prince of After School
Written by	Takeshi Konomi
Illustrated by	Kenichi Sakura
Published by	Shueisha
Magazine	Jump Square
Original run	November 4, 2008 – present
Volumes	9
Original video animation
Another Story
Directed by	Shunsuke Tada
Written by	Atsuhiro Tomioka
Music by	Cher Watanabe
Studio	M.S.C
Licensed by	Crunchyroll
Released	May 26, 2009 – October 26, 2011
Runtime	23 minutes
Episodes	8
Anime film
The Prince of Tennis: Eikoku-shiki Teikyū-jō Kessen!
Directed by	Shunsuke Tada
Music by	Cher Watanabe
Studio	Trans Arts; Production I.G
Licensed by	Funimation
Released	August 14, 2011
Runtime	88 minutes
Original video animation
The Prince of Tennis: Best Games!!
Directed by	Keiichiro Kawaguchi
Music by	Cher Watanabe
Studio	M.S.C; Tezuka Productions
Licensed by	Crunchyroll
Released	August 24, 2018 – November 15, 2019
Episodes	3
Anime film
Ryoma! The Prince of Tennis
Directed by	Hiroshi Kōjina
Produced by	Shuhei Arai
Written by	Takehito Hata
Music by	Kei Tsuda
Studio	The Monk Studios; Keica
Licensed by	NA: Eleven Arts
Released	September 3, 2021
Runtime	100 minutes
Sequel manga
The New Prince of Tennis (2009–2026)
Related works
Musical: The Prince of Tennis; The Prince of Tennis: Futari no Samurai (2005 animated film); The Prince of Tennis (2006 live-action film); The Prince of Tennis video games
- icon

The Prince of Tennis (Japanese: テニスの王子様, Hepburn: Tenisu no Ōjisama) (Note: The title is often shortened to TeniPuri (テニプリ), a blend of the words "Tennis Prince".) is a Japanese manga series written and illustrated by Takeshi Konomi. The manga was serialized in Shueisha's Weekly Shōnen Jump from July 1999 to March 2008, with its chapters collected in 42 tankōbon volumes. Viz Media licensed the manga for English release in North America.

A 178-episode anime television series adaptation animated by Trans Arts, co-produced by Nihon Ad Systems and TV Tokyo, was broadcast on TV Tokyo and its affiliates from October 2001 to March 2005. A sequel of three original video animation (OVA) series, totaling 26 episodes, were released from March 2006 to January 2009. In North America, the anime series was first licensed by Viz Media and later by Crunchyroll LLC.

The Prince of Tennis developed into a media franchise, including a long-running radio show, numerous video games, well over 250 soundtracks and CDs, and other merchandise. Since 2003, more than fifteen stage musicals adaptations have been produced. An anime film premiered in January 2005. A live-action film premiered in May 2006. A 3DCG film premiered in September 2021.

A sequel to the manga, titled The New Prince of Tennis, was serialized in Shueisha's Jump Square from March 2009 to August 2026, with the story taking place several months after the end of the original manga.

By November 2019, The Prince of Tennis manga had over 60 million copies in circulation, making it one of the best-selling manga series.

== Plot ==
The series is primarily set in Tokyo, and centers around Ryoma Echizen, a tennis prodigy who attends Seishun Academy (青春学園, Seishun Gakuen), or Seigaku (青学) for short, a school that is known for its strong tennis club and talented players. Shortly after entrance, Ryoma quickly defeats numerous upperclassmen, securing himself a spot as one of the team's regulars. In pursuit of their ultimate goal of winning the National Middle School Tennis Championship, members of the team make new friends while learning and mastering increasingly complex techniques. Ryoma also begins to develop his own style of tennis and eventually realizes what the sport really means to him.

== Media ==
=== Manga ===
Written and illustrated by Takeshi Konomi, The Prince of Tennis was serialized in Shueisha's shōnen manga magazine Weekly Shōnen Jump from July 6, 1999, (Note: It debuted in the magazine's 32nd issue of 1999 (cover date July 19), released on July 6 of that same year.) to March 3, 2008. Shueisha collected its 379 individual chapters into forty-two tankōbon volumes published from January 7, 2000, to June 4, 2008.

In North America, Viz Media announced the acquisition of the series in February 2004. The 42 volumes were released from April 21, 2004. to July 5, 2011.

A 4-panel manga parody by Ken-ichi Sakura, titled The Prince of After School (放課後の王子様, Hōkago no Ōjisama), began in Jump Square on November 4, 2008. The first collected volume was released on June 4, 2010. As of September 4, 2025, nine volumes have been released.

A sequel to the manga series, titled The New Prince of Tennis (新テニスの王子様, Shin Tennis no Ōjisama), was announced in the December issue of Jump Square, published on November 4, 2008. The series was serialized in Jump Square from March 4, 2009, to August 4, 2026. The story is set several months after the end of the first manga, and features Ryoma returning to Japan after his stay in America.

=== Anime ===
An anime television series adaptation animated by Trans Arts, co-produced by Nihon Ad Systems and directed by Takayuki Hamana, was broadcast on TV Tokyo from October 10, 2001, to March 30, 2005, spanning a total of 178 episodes. The episodes were collected in forty-five DVD sets, released from January 25, 2002, to October 28, 2005.

In North America, the anime series was licensed by Viz Media. On April 24, 2007, Viz Media released the first The Prince of Tennis box set in the United States. Viz Media has also opted to not include the Japanese opening and ending themes, instead using electric guitar music. However, the original music themes can be found in the DVD extras of disc 3. As of January 15, 2008, four box sets have been released by Viz. The four box sets contain the first 50 episodes of the series. On April 2, 2021, Crunchyroll (then known as Funimation) announced it had licensed the series, and it would stream it on their website with a new English dub. After Funimation was unified under the Crunchyroll brand in 2022, the series joined its namesake streaming service.

==== Original video animations ====
The anime television series was followed by a three original video animation (OVA) series which adapted the "National Tournament" arc. The first 13-episode OVA was launched on seven DVDs from March 24, 2006, to March 23, 2007; The second 6-episode OVA was launched on three DVDs from June 22, 2007, to January 25, 2008; The third 7-episode OVA was launched on four DVDs (including the first numbered 0) from April 25, 2008; to January 23, 2009.

A 4-episode OVA, subtitled "Another Story", was released on two DVDs on May 26 and September 25, 2009. A 4-episode sequel to "Another Story" was released on two DVDs on August 26 and October 26, 2011.

=== Musicals ===
Beginning in 2003, a series of Prince of Tennis musicals began. Each year sees two musicals based on the storyline come out in the summer and winter, with a 'Dream Live' performance each Spring, featuring numerous actors and past songs. Each storyline musical adapts a single arc of the manga, typically one specific match against a team. Due to the aging of the actors, all the main characters have been recast several times.

=== Films ===
The Prince of Tennis: Futari no Samurai (劇場版 テニスの王子様 二人のサムライ THE FIRST GAME, Gekijō-ban Tennis no Ōjisama Futari no Samurai Za Fāsuto Gēmu; lit. 'The Prince of Tennis – The Two Samurai: The First Game') is the first animated film of the series. It was released on January 29, 2005, and co-aired with a short film, Tennis no Oujisama: Atobe Kara no Okurimono (跡部からの贈り物; lit. 'The Prince of Tennis: A Gift from Atobe').

On May 13, 2006, a live-action film adaptation premiered in Japan.

Gekijō-ban Tennis no Ōjisama Eikoku-shiki Teikyū-jō Kessen! (劇場版テニスの王子様 英国式庭球城決戦!; lit. 'The Prince of Tennis: The Battle of the British City') is the second film directed by Shunsuke Tada. It was released on August 14, 2011.

At the Jump Festa '19 event, a new film titled Ryoma! The Prince of Tennis (リョーマ! The Prince of Tennis 新生劇場版テニスの王子様, Ryōma! Shinsei Gekijô-ban Tenisu no Ōjisama; lit. 'Ryoma! The New Prince of Tennis Movie') was announced. The film features an original story set between the end of The Prince of Tennis manga and the start of The New Prince of Tennis manga. The film is in 3DCG, and is directed by Hiroshi Kōjina and animated by The Monk Studios and Keica with cooperation by Studio Kai. Takehito Hata is writing scripts, Kei Tsuda is composing the music, and Konomi himself is supervising the film and writing all insert songs. It was initially scheduled to be released in early 2020, but it was delayed to September 3, 2021. Eleven Arts licensed the film for international release.

=== Video games ===
The Prince of Tennis franchise has spawned many different video games. The vast majority of these are either tennis games or dating sims, and they are spread across several different video game consoles. The first of these games was released for the PlayStation console on February 20, 2002, and is the only game which holds the simple Prince of Tennis title – all of the following game titles are preceded by the "Prince of Tennis" title. This was followed by Genius Boys Academy, which was released for the Game Boy Advance on April 25, 2002. Since then, several other video games have been released for different gaming consoles, including one more PlayStation game, three Game Boy Advance games, five Nintendo DS games, thirteen PlayStation 2 games, and one mobile game. The latest game to be released was New Prince of Tennis: Rising Beat in 2017, a rhythm-based mobile game developed by Bushiroad. This game is the first game to be released outside of Japan.

Additionally, characters from The Prince of Tennis appeared in the Shōnen Jump based video games Jump Super Stars and Jump Ultimate Stars.

=== Dramas ===
Two Chinese television adaptations of The Prince of Tennis have been produced. The first, Wǎngqiú Wángzǐ (网球王子), and its sequel, Jiāyóu! Wǎngqiú Wángzǐ (加油!网球王子), adapt the original story with localized names and cultural elements. A separate adaptation series by Netflix, Fèndòu ba, Shàonián! (奋斗吧，少年!), was released in 2019.

=== Other media ===
The series has produced a half-hour weekly radio show, over 300 music CDs and a large selection of merchandise. Including a trading card game and figures. Three live events, "TeniPuri Perfect Live" in 2003, "The 100 song marathon" in 2008 and "Tenipuri Festa" in 2009, were held by the TeniPuri voice actors and Konomi Takeshi himself.

The 1986 J-pop song "Valentine Kiss" by Sayuri Kokushō was covered multiple times by multiple characters in the series. From February 2004 through February 2010, a total of nine different versions of the song were released (seven individually, and the final two together). The first one, featuring the character Keigo Atobe (voiced by Junichi Suwabe) reached No. 14 on the Oricon charts.

== Reception ==
The Prince of Tennis has become a successful franchise. By March 2008, the first 40 volumes of the manga had sold over 40 million copies. By January 2012, the manga had over 51 million copies in circulation. By November 2019, the manga had over 60 million copies in circulation.

Carl Kimlinger from Anime News Network reviewed the first DVD box set released by Viz Media, and commented that "Prince of Tennis is among the dregs of the genre." They go on to say that it is "boring" and "lacks the human drama necessary to get audiences to care who wins or loses." Chris Beveridge of Mania.com, however, commented that the show "takes the usual themes in sports shows and applies them masterfully." DVD Talk takes more of a nonchalant view, commenting that the "series is okay but not great" and that it has some charm, which will make you not regret watching it. Active Anime also gave praise to the series, saying that it "holds some surprising twists to the regular sports drama formula", and praised the suspenseful matches and innovative techniques.

In a 2005 poll conducted by TV Asahi for the 100 most popular anime television series, The Prince of Tennis came in 27th place. They also conducted an online web poll, in which The Prince of Tennis placed eighteenth. Nearly a year later, TV Asahi once again conducted an online poll for the top 100 anime series, and The Prince of Tennis advanced in rank and came in eighth place. They also surveyed Japanese celebrities for their favorite anime, where the series only came in 68th out of the top 100.
