= The Prince of Tennis (seasons 3 and 4) =

Japanese anime series seasons

The episodes covering the third and fourth seasons of The Prince of Tennis anime series are directed by Takayuki Hama animated by Trans Arts, and co-produced by Nihon Ad Systems, J.C.Staff, and Production I.G. The two seasons originally aired on the terrestrial Japanese network TV Tokyo from October 2002 to August 2003. The anime is an adaption of Konomi's Prince of Tennis manga series created in 2000. The series revolves around a 12-year-old tennis prodigy named Ryoma Echizen, who moves back to his native Japan in order to attend his father's alma mater, a private middle school famous for its strong tennis team.

Viz Media handled the distribution of the series in North America, where the anime debuted as streaming media on Viz's and Cartoon Network's joint online broadband service called Toonami Jetstream on July 14, 2006. It first aired on North American television as part of Toonami's Saturday programming block on December 23, 2006. In April 2021, Funimation announced they acquired the series.

Four pieces of theme music are used for the episodes in seasons three and four: two opening themes and two ending themes. The first opening theme, "Make You Free" by Kimeru and Hisoca, and the first ending theme, "White Line" by Aozu - the voice actors of Ryoma Echizen, Tezuka Kunimitsu, Shusuke Fuji, and Shuichiro Oishi - are used from episode fifty-four to seventy-five. The second opening theme, "Long Way" by Ikuo, and the second ending theme, "Kaze no Tabibito" (風の旅人; lit. Wind Traveler) by Fureai (ふれあい), are used for the remaining episodes of the two seasons, which are episodes 76 to 101.

== Episode list ==
=== Season 3 ===
==== Kanto Tournament Saga – Part I: Hyotei Academy (Eps. 54–68) ====
No.	Title	Original release date
54	"Kaoru's Special Training" "Kaoru no Tokkun" (薫の特訓)	October 23, 2002
During the tournament combination drawings, Seigaku learns of their next opponent, Hyotei Academy. Meanwhile, in preparation for Seigaku's next match, Kaido trains especially hard in order to perfect his Boomerang Snake, in which Inui decides to help him with for a price: to become his doubles' partner. Also, Hyotei's rigorous regular selection process is revealed!
55	"Hyotei Presses Near" "Semarikuru Hyōtei" (迫りくる氷帝)	October 30, 2002
Seigaku arrives at the tennis court for their upcoming match, but Shuichiro Oishi is delayed after stopping to help a falling pregnant woman on his way to the match. Takeshi Momoshiro runs to take Oishi's place at the hospital, but discovers Oishi sustained an injury in the process. Oishi pleads with Momoshiro to play in his stead. Ryoma is the sub this time, as due to his small stature, the team feels he may be unable to withstand strong attacks from their opponents.
56	"Doubles for Three" "Sannin no Daburusu" (3人のダブルス)	November 6, 2002
Due Oishi's absence, Momoshiro ends up playing doubles with Eiji Kikumaru, but the latter is unable to play to his fullest. However, once Eiji gets used to Momoshiro's presence, he begins to play in his normal play style. Oishi later shows up to cheer for them on the sidelines, encouraging the two to play to their fullest.
57	"Scud Serve" "Sukaddo Sābu" (スッカドサーブ)	November 13, 2002
After Momoshiro and Eiji beat their opponents, Sadaharu Inui and Kaoru Kaido play against Ryo Shishido and Chotaro Ohtori pair. To start off the match, Ohtori shows them his Scud Serve, a super fast serve verging on 200 km/h. Since the serve was not in Inui's data, the pair has difficulty in trying to return it.
58	"The Worst Compatibility" "Saiaku no Aishō!?" (最悪の相性!?)	November 20, 2002
Neither Inui nor Kaido can react fast enough to Ohtori's Scud Serve. Even after Inui removes his weighted wrist bands; which granted him more speed, still wasn't enough to return the Scud Serve. As the Seigaku pair struggle, Keigo Atobe, Hyotei's captain, reflects back on how hard Shishido and Ohtori trained for this.
59	"The Hidden Trouble" "Akunaki Kodawari" (あくなきこだわり)	November 27, 2002
As Inui reveals that he only needs data on Shishido and Ohtori because he has completed all the others, his past of how he took interest in Data Tennis is revealed. After Inui gathers the required data, Inui and Kaido finally make a comeback. However, even after Kaido reveals he has mastered his Boomerang Snake technique, the other team still proves formidable as they are able to return it, allowing them to secure their win.
60	"Power vs. Power" "Pawā VS Pawā" (パワーVSパワー)	December 4, 2002
Munehiro Kabaji and Takashi Kawamura battle it out with a power duel.
61	"Duel of Hadokyu!" "Hadōkyū Gassen!" (波動球合戦!)	December 11, 2002
Kawamura uses the one and two-handed Hadokyu, but Kabaji copies it. It becomes a duel of whose arm will last longest, which results in both sides sustaining injuries and neither side winning.
62	"The Disappearing Serve" "Kieru Sābu" (消えるサーブ)	December 18, 2002
Shusuke Fuji wants to pay Jirou Akutagawa back for defeating Yuta, and he also wants to win for Kawamura, who was injured along with Kabaji. Fuji thus reveals a very special serve.
63	"The Last Triple Counter" "Saigo no Toripuru Kauntā" (最後のトリプルカウンター)	December 25, 2002
Fuji shows the last of his Triple Counter, Hakugei, and defeats Jirou.
64	"Compilation stories TeniPuri" "Bangaihen Tenipuri" (番外編 てにぷり)	January 8, 2003
Short stories involving super deformed versions of the characters; includes "Super Soldier", "Beware of Snow White?!", and "Jump out! Seigaku".
65	"Become Seigaku's Pillar of Support" "Seigaku no Hashira ni Nare" (青学の柱になれ)	January 15, 2003
Kunimitsu Tezuka, Seigaku's captain, faces off against Atobe, while Oishi reminisces about his promise to Tezuka: they would take Seigaku to the Nationals; and how Tezuka's arm was injured when they were first years.
66	"Rondo Towards Destruction" "Hametsu e no Rondo" (破滅への輪舞曲)	January 22, 2003
Atobe shows his special two-part smash, the Rondo Towards Destruction.
67	"End of the ball" "Saigo no Ikkyū" (最後の一球)	January 29, 2003
Tezuka continues to use his left hand, even though he is aware of the injuries he may further sustain.
68	"The Never Ending Tie-Break" "Owarinaki Taiburēku" (終わりなきタイブレーク)	February 5, 2003
Atobe and Tezuka continue the match, and enters a long tie-break, until Atobe finally wins. Ryoma then plays the last match against Wakashi Hiyoshi, and wins with his Drive B, but also reveals that through watching Tezuka's match he also picked up the Captain's speciality shot. Ryoma also seems to be stronger.

==== Tezuka's Departure saga (Filler eps. 69–75) ====
No.	Title	Original release date
69	"Who Will be a Regular?" "Regyurā no Za wa Dare no Te ni?" (レギュラーの座は誰の手に?)	February 12, 2003
Kachiro Kato, a Seigaku freshman, gets upset with Masashi Arai and his friends for being insensitive to the regulars who have injuries. They battle it out on the courts, and whoever loses has to quit the tennis club.
70	"Tennis vs. Ping Pong" "Tenisu VS Pinpon" (テニスVSピンポン)	February 19, 2003
During Seigaku's club day, Ryoma participates in ping pong, while other members of the team participate in various sports as well. He gets challenged by a prodigy ex-ping pong member.
71	"It's a date!" "Dēto Da!" (デートだ!)	February 26, 2003
Ann Tachibana asks Momoshiro for a date, but Momoshiro forces Ryoma to join too. Inui was nearby and thought these three were a love triangle and calls almost all the regulars to see this. It turned out to be a tennis date at the street tennis court. Kamio sees Ann and Momo and gets jealous, leading to Fuji mistaking the love triangle 'relationship' to a love square 'relationship' – between Momo, Echizen, Kamio and Ann. At the end, players from different schools play doubles match – Ryoma and Shinji Ibu against Akira Kamio and Momoshiro.
72	"Kaoru becomes Ryoma" "Kaoru, Ryōma ni Naru" (薫, リョーマになる)	March 5, 2003
Kaido is forced to impersonate Ryoma due to a mistake in a tennis magazine by Shiba, a reporter, and ends up playing a match with Momoshiro. He also earns himself a few fans.
73	"Tezuka's Decision" "Tezuka no Ketsui" (手塚の決意)	March 12, 2003
Oishi tells everyone to come at midnight for a surprise trip to the mountains. Tezuka later reveals his decision to leave for Germany.
74	"A Message for Echizen" "Echizen he no Messēji" (越前へのメッセージ)	March 19, 2003
Tezuka challenges Ryoma to another match using his right hand, and successfully uses the right-handed Tezuka Zone against him.
75	"Farewell, Tezuka Kunimitsu" "Saraba, Tezuka Kunimitsu" (さらば, 手塚国光)	March 26, 2003
Ryoma finally breaks the Tezuka Zone, but still loses in the end. Tezuka leaves for Germany.

=== Season 4 ===
==== Kanto Tournament Saga – Part II: The Quarterfinals – Josei Shonan Jr. High (Eps. 76–85) ====
No.	Title	Original release date
76	"Seigaku vs. Josei Shonan" "Seigaku tai Jōsei Shōnan" (青学対城成湘南)	April 9, 2003
The members of the Josei Shonan team are introduced. Their training techniques are one-of-a-kind. Finally, the match between Seigaku and Josei is starting. The Josei coach tries to scout Ryoma over when they meet near the entrance but is rejected.
77	"Fight of the Calm and the Passionate" "Reisei to Jyōnetsu no Tatakai" (冷静と情熱の戦い)	April 16, 2003
Momoshiro is easily provoked by Josei Shonan's "unit", but gets his act together and makes a comeback. However, when Momo accidentally drinks some of Inui's experimental Juice, Seigaku is forced to forfeit the doubles two game.
78	"Thunderbolt" "Sandāboruto" (サンダーボルト)	April 23, 2003
The "Golden Pair" of Seigaku has to play with a very weird combination of Josei Shonan members in the doubles one match.
79	"I formation" "I (Ai) Fōmēshon" (I (アイ) フォーメーション)	April 30, 2003
The Golden Pair reveals the I Formation, a new formation similar to the Australian Formation, and win the game.
80	"Style of the Pretender" "Puritendā Senbō" (プリテンダーの戦法)	May 7, 2003
Hiroshi Wakato, the copy genius of Josei Shonan, faces off against Kaido, who struggles to overcome Wakato's change-over technique.
81	"Viper vs. Fake Viper" "Mamushi VS Nise Mamushi" (マムシVSニセマムシ)	May 14, 2003
Kaido continues to struggle against Wakato's technique, until he notices the key to Wakato's play style.
82	"Hanamura's Temptation" "Hanamura no Yūwaku" (華村の誘惑)	May 21, 2003
The Kaido/Wakato match goes to a tie-break and Kaido must overcome his fiercest opponent – himself. In the end, Kaido prevails and takes the win.
83	"The Best Masterpiece" "Saikō no Sakuhin" (最高の作品)	May 28, 2003
Singles two – Ryoma Echizen and Reiji Shinjo commences, with Ryoma seemingly heading for an easy victory until Shinjo introduces his Mirage technique. Of course, Ryoma understands this trick after a while and is able to 'seal' this technique. Things seem to go well for Ryoma again but he suddenly gets 'attacked' !
84	"Deep Impulse" "Dīpu Inparusu" (ディープ·インパルス)	June 4, 2003
Shinjo's old aggressive tennis style is revealed. His old style was previously sealed by Josei's coach, Aoi Hanamura, because it injured the opponent, causing him to want to quit tennis. He also injures Ryoma's face a couple of times but Ryoma has his counter-attack ready. Josei regulars are shocked to see Shinjo losing to the chibi freshman from Seigaku.
85	"The Result of the Deadly Duel" "Shitō no Hate" (死闘の果て)	June 11, 2003
Ryoma overcomes the deadly power of Shijo's technique, Deep Impulse, and wins the game. The team then celebrates at Kawamura's sushi restaurant. As promised, losers have to eat wasabi sushi – Inui and Momoshiro in danger!

==== Recreation Saga (Filler eps. 86–90) ====
No.	Title	Original release date
86	"High on Rhythm!" "Rizumu ni High!" (リズムにHigh!)	June 18, 2003
Kiyosumi Sengoku of Yamabuki faces Akira Kamio of Fudomine in a match of attrition.
87	"Prince of Tennis Special!" "Tenisu no Ōjisama Supersharuna!" (テニスの王子様スペシャル!)	June 25, 2003
The Seigaku team goes bowling. Coach Ryuzaki divides the team into six teams of two. Inui introduces his new drink 'Aozu'. He arranged the rules that the gutter balls will be given the shot (a small glass of Aozu) and the loser will be given the whole drink. Everyone is knocked out by Aozu including Fuji (who could resist Inui's Juice). Also he introduces 'Akazu' for the winner.
88	"Prince of Tennis Special!" "Tenisu no Ōjisama Supersharuna!" (テニスの王子様スペシャル!)	June 25, 2003
A short super deformed story, where Inui loses his glasses, follows the bowling fiasco.
89	"Seigaku, Dadada Dan" "Seigaku, Dadada Dan" (青学, ダダダ壇)	July 2, 2003
Taichi Dan of Yamabuki arrives at Seigaku to challenge Ryoma to a match.
90	"Cheap Housing Beach Volleyball" "Bōsō Bīchibarē" (房総ビーチバレー)	July 9, 2003
The Seigaku team goes to the beach, where Sasabe and his father turns up for a beach volleyball challenge against Ryoma and Kaido.

==== Kanto Tournament Saga – Part III: The Semifinals – Rokkaku Jr. High (Eps. 91–97) ====
No.	Title	Original release date
91	"Rokkaku's Freshman Captain" "Rokkaku Chū no Ichinensei Buchō" (六角中の一年生部長)	July 16, 2003
Seigaku's regulars meet Rokkaku Middle School's regulars on their way home, and Kentaro Aoi has a practice match with Ryoma Echizen, revealing Kentaro's great ball control.
92	"The Boy with the Long Racket" "Naga Raketto no Otoko" (長ラケットの男)	July 23, 2003
Harukaze "Bane" Kurobane and Hikaru "Davide" Amane, who has a long racket, have a match against Momoshiro and Kawamura in doubles.
93	"Dash Hadokyu" "Dasshu Hadōkyū" (ダッシュ波動球)	July 30, 2003
Kawamura develops a new technique that knocks out the rackets of their opponent. Though their opponent is surprised and worried about Kawamura's Dash Hadokyu, they find out that Kawamura can only use it once per game, otherwise, it will destroy his wrist.
94	"The Secret Plan to Seal Kikumaru" "Kikumaru Fūji no Hisaku" (菊丸封じの秘策)	August 6, 2003
Eiji's acrobatic play is sealed by Rokkaku's Saeki Kojirō, until he reveals his amazing Seal Step. Unfortunately, Eiji's stamina is drained easily.
95	"Tsubame Gaeshi, Broken" "Tsubame Gaeshi, Yaburetari!" (つばめ返し, 破れたり!)	August 13, 2003
Fuji's Tsubame Gaeshi becomes useless due to Rokkaku's Marehiko Itsuki's ability to hit a sinker, ball with no spin. Fuji then makes Itsuki hit a cord ball, thus creating a slight spin, allowing Fuji to use Tsubame Gaeshi again.
96	"Ryoma, Get Pumped!" "Moero Ryōma!" (燃えろリョーマ!)	August 20, 2003
Ryoma fights Kentaro Aoi in a game that continues for over 3 hours and has to continue to the next day because of the setting sun.
97	"Finishing Smash" "Ketchaku no Sumasshu" (決着のスマッシュ)	August 27, 2003
Ryoma and Aoi can't sleep because they are so pumped up from their game. They both go to the courts and decide to play an unofficial game in the early morning, before the sun is up. When the rest of the Seigaku team arrives at the playing time, they can't find Ryoma and they think something's wrong but then they find him and Aoi fast asleep in the grass with all their stuff. The match continues where it left off and Ryoma manages to win the game by using his Drive B with a slight variation.

==== Recreation Saga before learning about Rikkai Jr. High (Filler eps. 98–101) ====
No.	Title	Original release date
98	"The Prince of Billiards"	September 3, 2003
Fuji exacts his revenge for the previous bowling outing by introducing the team to billiards, only for Ryoma to foil his victory.
99	"The Cursed Racket"	September 10, 2003
Ryoma finds a mysterious racket lying in front of his house and because of it, strange misfortunes happen in Seigaku.
100	"Captain Oishi"	September 17, 2003
In the absence of Tezuka, a tense Oishi puts the team through its paces.
101	"Eat Rikkaidai"	September 24, 2003
Lunch at Kawamura's sushi place; the team watches Fudomine's defeat by Rikkaidai, witnessing Akaya's play that injured Tachibana in the game. The team vows to exact revenge and win.

== See also ==
- List of The Prince of Tennis episodes
- Tennis no Ōjisama – Futari no Samurai
