= List of The Prince of Tennis episodes =

The episodes of The Prince of Tennis (テニスの王子様, Tenisu no Ōjisama) anime series created by Takeshi Konomi are directed by Takayuki Hamana, animated by Trans Arts, and co-produced by Nihon Ad Systems, J.C.Staff, and Production I.G. The anime is an adaptation of Konomi's Prince of Tennis Japanese manga series. The series revolves around a 12-year-old tennis prodigy named Ryoma Echizen, who moves back to his native Japan in order to attend his father's alma mater, Seishun Academy, a private middle school famous for its strong tennis team.

The anime series first aired on the terrestrial Japanese network TV Tokyo from October 10, 2001, to March 30, 2005, airing a total of one-hundred and seventy-eight episodes, which spanned across forty-five DVDs in Japan. In April 2006, an OVA continuation of the anime began to be released on DVD, totaling thirteen episodes across seven DVDs. A second OVA also began being released on DVD on June 22, 2007. It spanned a total of six episodes that are spread across three DVDs, the last of which being released on January 25, 2008. The third and final installment in the National OVA series contains seven episodes spread across four DVDs released from April 25, 2008, to January 23, 2009. The OVAs are animated by Production I.G and Bandai Visual, with the latter also handling the DVD distribution of the OVAs in Japan along with Amuse Soft Entertainment.

Viz Media handled the distribution of the series in North America, where the episodes debuted as streaming media on Viz's and Cartoon Network's joint online broadband service called Toonami Jetstream on July 14, 2006. It first began airing on North American television as part of Toonami's Saturday programming block on December 23, 2006. However, it was removed from Toonami's schedule on June 9, 2007, and was also removed from Toonami Jetstream after episode fifty's broadcast on December 3, 2007. In April 2021, Crunchyroll, then known as Funimation, announced they had licensed the series, and it would stream it on their website with a new English dub. After Funimation was unified under the Crunchyroll brand in 2022, the series joined its namesake streaming service.

As of January 15, 2008, a total of four DVD compilations, containing the first fifty episodes, have been released by Viz Media. All four compilations contain three discs, each containing four episodes, save the final discs of the first two compilations, which contain five episodes.

The 1986 J-pop song Valentine Kiss by Sayuri Kokushō was covered multiple times by multiple characters in the series. From February 2004 through February 2010, a total of nine different versions were released (seven individually, and the final two together). The first one, featuring the character Keigo Atobe (voiced by Junichi Suwabe) reached #14 on the Oricon charts.

== Episode list ==
Notes concerning English titles and airdates

- The English titles for the first fifty episodes are of the officially released titles by Viz Media. The remaining English titles are unofficial translations of the original Japanese titles.
- The English airdates are of the Toonami Jetstream premieres, which came before Toonami's television broadcasts of the episodes.

=== Seasons 1 and 2: 2001–02 ===
==== Intraschool Rankings Saga – Part I (Eps. 1–10) ====
No.	Title	Original release date	English airdate
1	"A Prince Appears" "Ōjisama Arawaru" (王子様現る)	October 10, 2001	July 14, 2006; Toonami Jetstream premiere
At the request of his father, Ryoma Echizen moves back to Japan after having success at tennis in the United States, having won four consecutive American Junior Openings. On his way to a Japanese tennis tournament, he "saves" Sakuno Ryuzaki from some thugs like an absolute pro. However due to this, he misses the tournament, however, he finds an opponent in the form of one of the thugs he met on the subway. He then puts his opponent, Sasabe, in his place during the match, where he reveals his exceptional tennis capabilities.
2	"Samurai Junior" "Samurai Junia" (サムライ·ジュニア)	October 17, 2001	July 24, 2006
Upon his arrival in Seishun Academy, "Seigaku" for short, Ryoma teaches a lesson to two juniors who are picking on the freshmen. Takeshi Momoshiro, one of the team's regulars, puts a stop to it and decides to play Ryoma in a tennis match. Noticing that Momoshiro has a bad ankle, Ryoma decides not to play with his dominant hand. Also, Sakuno's energetic friend, Tomoka, is introduced to Ryoma, and instantly proclaims herself to be his number one fan.
3	"The Seigaku Regulars Make Their Debut!" "They've Arrived! The Seigaku Regulars // Tōjō! Seigaku Regurā" (登場!青学レギュラー)	October 24, 2001	July 31, 2006
The Seigaku regulars are introduced, while a journalist, Mamoru Inoue, and a photographer, Saori Shiba, visit Seigaku in order to report on the team's upcoming ranking matches. Meanwhile, Ryoma defeats a second year non-regular, Arai, using an old broken tennis racket when the latter hides all three of Ryoma's rackets. Seeing his skill, the captain of the tennis team, Kunimitsu Tezuka, enters Ryoma's name on the roster for the intraschool ranking matches despite the fact that he is a freshman.
4	"The One Named Viper" "The Man Called Viper // Mamushi to Yobareru Otoko" (マムシと呼ばれる男)	October 31, 2001	August 7, 2006
The Seigaku ranking matches has begun, and Ryoma and the Seigaku regulars continue to win their matches early on in the tournament. Ryoma then gets pitted against regular Kaoru Kaido in the third round, where the latter reveals his special move, the Snake Shot. This throws Ryoma off guard, so he decides to switch to his dominant hand.
5	"Snake Shot" "Suneiku Shotto" (スネイク·ショット)	November 7, 2001	August 14, 2006
Kaido attempts to use his Snake shot to wear off Ryoma's stamina, and though Ryoma initially shows signs of sweating and fatigue, he surprises both Kaido and the spectators when his speed and power does not decrease. Near the end, it is revealed that Ryoma had been implementing a plan: he had been specifically hitting shots that Kaido had to bend his knees in order to return, thus Kaido would lose stamina far faster than Ryoma. His plan works, earning him the win.
6	"Nanjiro Echizen" "That Man, Echizen Nanjirō // Sono Otoko, Echizen Nanjirō" (その男, 越前南次郎)	November 14, 2001	August 21, 2006
Inoue plays a match with Nanjiro Echizen, the former "Samurai Nanjiro", a legendary tennis professional, to get answers about why he retired. Though Nanjiro appears to not be taking it seriously, his skills show otherwise, and he easily beats Inoue with both his eyes closed. However, Inoue finds out that Nanjiro is now focusing on developing the skills of his son, Ryoma. Meanwhile, Sakuno looks for Ryoma to learn more about him and tennis.
7	"The Two Ryomas" "Futari no Ryōma" (二人のリョーマ)	November 21, 2001	September 5, 2006
In Ryoma's next ranking match, he plays against Inui Sadaharu, who uses Data Tennis to counter Ryoma's play style. Using the data he gathered from Ryoma's previous match, Inui is able to dominate the match by accurately predicting and countering Ryoma's moves. Though irritated, Ryoma refuses to give up and reveals that he is glad to have transferred into Seigaku because he can now play against different types of players, like Inui.
8	"The Split Step" "Supurittosuteppu" (スプリットステップ)	November 28, 2001	September 18, 2006
In order to counter Inui's data, Ryoma uses a new technique he had practiced when playing against his father, the One-footed Split Step. This requires him to continuously hop in place so he can react faster to the ball, as well as be able to move to another part of the court more quickly. Using this technique, Ryoma gains enough agility and speed to return Inui's calculated shots. This, along with the Twist Serve, surpasses Inui's data and turns the game into Ryoma's favor.
9	"The Hard Day" "Za Hādo Dei" (ザ·ハード·デイ)	December 5, 2001	October 2, 2006
Inui continues to be unable to return Ryoma's Twist Serve, resulting in his eventual loss. Ryoma then wins his next games, and finally becomes a regular. Meanwhile, Inui plays against his next opponent, Kaido, who also surpasses Inui's data and takes a spot in the regulars as well. With eight spots taken, Inui loses his place as a regular, however, Seigaku's coach, Sumire Ryuzaki, asks him to help in the regulars' training instead. During training, he introduces his special and dreaded vegetable juice, which most of the regulars fall victim to.
10	"Counterattack! Sasabe Again?" "Counter Attack! Sasabe Once Again // Gyakushuu! Sasabe Futatabi" (逆襲!佐々部再び)	December 12, 2001	October 16, 2006
Ryoma and the rest of the freshmen go to where Kachiro's father works as a tennis coach. However, they find trouble with Sasabe again, but this time, Sasabe's father is the bigger problem. In order to teach him a lesson, Ryoma asks the father to teach him tennis. Though Sasabe warns his father not to, the latter is more than willing to do so. In their practice match, the father ends up pulling a muscle after Ryoma shows him just how much he should have listened to Kachiro's father's advice about warming up first.

==== Tokyo Preliminaries Saga – Part I: Fudomine Jr. High (Eps. 11–20) ====
No.	Title	Original release date	English airdate
11	"Ryoma vs. Momoshiro" "Echizen VS Momoshiro" (越前VS桃城)	December 19, 2001	October 23, 2006
Realizing that the only remaining singles slot left is singles 3, Ryoma and Momoshiro compete for it when they both want to play singles in the upcoming match against Gyokurin Middle School. However, when they decide to settle it with a match, they end up playing doubles against locals instead. Though they defeat their first few challengers, they are utterly defeated by two cocky Gyokurin players due to their lack of teamwork. It is then that the two decide to play doubles in the upcoming match.
12	"The Perfect Match" "The Two "AH UN" Boys // A Un na Futari" (ア·ウンな二人)	December 26, 2001	October 30, 2006
Momoshiro and Ryoma volunteer to play in doubles 2, and develop a tactic to improve their playing coordination. However, despite their practice, they continue to clash with each other due to their natural dominant tendencies as singles players. In addition, their rivals use a strategy which takes advantage of Momoshiro and Ryoma's lack of coordination, turning the game into their favor.
13	"Real Men Play Doubles" "Men Play Doubles // Otoko wa Doburusu" (男はダブルス!)	January 9, 2002	November 6, 2006
With their new strategy, Gyokurin continues to dominate. Irritated, Ryoma and Momoshiro realize that they are truly not suited to be doubles players, and agree to split the court in half. Now they each only have to defend one half of the court and is able to utilize their individual skills. Though strange, it is an effective strategy that wins them the game. However, due to their shameful performance, they still receive punishment from their coach.
14	"The Triple Counter" "The Swallow Return! // Tsubame Gaeshi!" (つばめ返し!)	January 16, 2002	November 13, 2006
Fudomine Middle School, an unknown team that withdrew from last tournament for internal affairs, is Seigaku's next rival. In the first game, Seigaku's Shusuke Fuji and Takashi Kawamura find themselves struggling against the first Fudomine pair, forcing Fuji to use one of his Triple Counters, Tsubame Gaeshi, a technique that causes the ball to roll rather than bounce once it reaches the opponents' side of the court.
15	"To Each His Own Battle" "Their Respective Fights // Sorezore no Tatakai" (それぞれの戦い)	January 23, 2002	November 20, 2006
Determined to overcome Fuji's skills, Fudomine's Tetsu Ishida tries a desperate measure to seal Fuji's Tsubame Gaeshi by using a hit of considerable strength called Hadokyu. When he aims it directly toward Fuji, Kawamura decides to get in its way when he realizes that Fuji would not be able to return it. Hoverer, though he succeeds in returning it, he hurts his wrist in the process, forcing Seigaku to forfeit the match.
16	"The Boomerang Snake" "Būmeran Suneiku" (ブーメラン·スネイク)	January 30, 2002	November 27, 2006
Thanks to Eiji Kikumaru's acrobatics and Shuichiro Oishi's ability to adapt to his partner's style, Seigaku's "Golden Pair" wins their doubles match easily. Next is the game between Kaido and Kamio Akira, where Kaoru's Snake shot turns out to be ineffective against the speed ace from Fudomine. In a moment of desperation, Kaido inadvertently performs a near impossible shot around the net's pole, which is then dubbed the Boomerang Snake.
17	"A Little Gesture of Triumph" "The Small Winning Pose // Chiisana Gattsupōzu" (小さなガッツポーズ)	February 6, 2002	December 4, 2006
Kaido desperately tries to recreate the Boomerang Snake, but he eventually stops his attempts when he decides to just play his style of tennis. With neither side yielding, Kamio's and Kaido's game becomes an endurance match. However, in the end, Kaido's willpower and persistence outlasts Kamio's stamina. Also, Momoshiro learns the identity of the girl he has been recently running into, who turns out to be Fudomine's player-coach and Kippei Tachibana's younger sister, An Tachibana.
18	"The Love Letter" "Raburetā" (ラブレター)	February 13, 2002	December 11, 2006
Tezuka found out Nanjiro is Ryoma's father. Nanjiro Echizen finds a letter from Ryuzaki and remembers the days when he trained under her as a Seigaku regular. Meanwhile, Ryoma's opponent, Shinji Ibu, shows his skills when he is able to return Ryoma's Twist Serve, as well as his revealing his own serve, the Kick Serve, which is similar to the Twist Serve. Ryoma then switches to his left hand, and the game heats up between the two player's serves.
19	"Battle-Scarred Ryoma" "Ryoma is Injured // Kizudarake no Ryoma" (傷だらけのリョーマ)	February 20, 2002	December 18, 2006
Ryoma struggles to resist Ibu's "spot", a technique where Ibu forces Ryoma to hit certain shots that temporarily paralyzes his arm. However, when Ryoma tries to spin his body instead of moving his arm the racket gets loose from his grip and it bounces back, hitting his eye. With his eyelid bleeding, it seems impossible for him to continue, but he insists on continuing the match.
20	"Time Limit" "Taimurimitto" (タイムリミット)	February 27, 2002	December 26, 2006
Impressed with his determination, Tezuka gives Ryoma ten minutes to finish the game, after which he will forfeit the match. In the end, Ryoma manages to overcome Ibu's "spot" and wins the match right before his allotted time had ended. With Ryoma's win, Seigaku wins the tournament, and after tending to his wounds, the Seigaku regulars celebrate in Kawamura's sushi restaurant.

==== Seigaku's Training Saga – Part I (Eps. 21–26) ====
No.	Title	Original release date	English airdate
21	"Is the Tennis Court Burning Up?" "Tenisukōto wa Moeteiruka?" (テニスコートは燃えているか?)	March 3, 2002	January 2, 2007
Due to their recent victories, spies from other schools begin to observe Seigaku's training. When they catch two of the spies spying on them even after school hours, Momoshiro and Ryoma teach the two of them a lesson in a doubles match. When the two spies are only able to score one point against them, they decide to practice their tennis, instead of spying on others.
22	"Kaoru's Troubles" "Kaoru no Sainan" (薫の災難)	March 13, 2002	January 16, 2007
While Kaido starts his daily training, Momoshiro and Kamio Akira end up playing a doubles match against two Hyotei regulars, Atobe Keigo and Munehiro Kabaji, when the latter two pick on An Tachibana. Meanwhile, Ryoma and Shinji Ibu battle over grip tape by creating a contest in which they catch a pickpocket. Kaido is then unwittingly dragged into the mess when he is suspected of being the thief.
23	"Here Comes Inui's Deluxe Drink!" "Appeared! Inui's Juice Deluxe // Tōjyō! Inui Jiru Derakkusu" (登場!乾汁デラックス)	March 20, 2002	January 29, 2007
During their new training regimen, Kaido and Oishi are forced to drink Inui's special vegetable juice for losing in their training match, becoming very sick. Then, when Tezuka accidentally drinks all of Inui's juice, Inui is forced to use his "Golden Power Remix Inui Juice" on the loser of the Kikumaru and Ryoma match. When Ryoma fails to win the game within five shots, which was the requirement for him to win, he ends being the one to drink it.
24	"Ryoma's Day Off" "Ryoma's Holiday // Ryōma no Kyuujitsu" (リョーマの休日)	March 27, 2002	February 12, 2007
Ryoma is asked by coach Ryuzaki to go to the racket-stringer with Sakuno, whom he constantly ignores, though unknowingly. Curious what Ryoma is up to, Nanjiro decides to follow him, and after seeing the two together, Momoshiro and the freshman trio, spy on the two, believing that they are on a date. However, Ryoma continues to ignore her and even end up hurting her feelings when she asks about him. In the end, Ryoma tries to make up for it by teaching her some tennis.
25	"Seigaku's Strongest Man, Part 1" "Seigaku Saikyō no Otoko" (青学最強の男)	April 10, 2002	February 26, 2007
Feeling that Ryoma's tennis is a simple copy of his father's, Tezuka asks coach Ryuzaki for permission to play an unofficial match against Ryoma. Before his match, Tezuka and Oishi go to a clinic to check whether or not Tezuka's arm has healed. Though it is healed, the doctor warns him not to play long matches and to not use his drop shot. After finding out he is fine, he meets up with Ryoma. Suspicious of the two's meeting, Oishi decides to follow the pair to see what is really going on.
26	"Seigaku's Strongest Man, Part 2" "Seigaku Saikyō no Otoko" (青学最強の男)	April 10, 2002	March 12, 2007
During their match, in order to convince the latter to aim higher with his own style of tennis, Tezuka risks re-injuring his arm by going all out in the match, resulting in Ryoma's defeat. Oishi, who was the sole spectator of the Tezuka and Ryoma match, talks to Tezuka about the outcome and its repercussions. The next day at school, the other team members, grow suspicious when Tezuka and Ryoma fail to appear during team practice two days in a row. Meanwhile, Ryoma asks Nanjiro for a match, in which the latter realizes that Ryoma has changed and will now get stronger.

==== Tokyo Metropolitan Tournament Saga – Part II: St. Rudolph Academy (Eps. 27–36) ====
No.	Title	Original release date	English airdate
27	"Kalpin's Adventure" "Karupin's Adventure // Karupin no Bōken" (カルピンの冒険)	April 17, 2002	March 26, 2007
Ryoma accidentally packs his cat's [Karupin] favorite toy in his tennis bag, so Karupin follows him to school and explores the grounds. When Ryoma finds out his cat is on campus, he rushes to find him, worried about what may become of him. After finding out that Ryoma has been relentlessly searching for his cat, the other members help him in his search, eventually helping him find Karupin.
28	"A New Regular Appears!?" "Shin Regyurā Arawaru!?" (新レギュラー現る!?)	April 24, 2002	April 9, 2007
When Ryoma oversleeps before the match, Satoshi Horio, another freshman, is forced to impersonate Ryoma, but he gets challenged by another player when the latter hears him bragging about his supposed skills. Luckily for Horio, Ryoma arrives just in time to bail him out. Meanwhile, Hajime Mizuki, the manager of St. Rudolph's tennis team, tells Akiyama, Seigaku's opponent, how to target the Seigaku players' weak spots.
29	"Momo and Viper" "Momo to Mamushi" (桃とマムシ)	May 1, 2002	April 23, 2007
The next tournament starts, and the Seigaku team is informed of their positions. Momoshiro and Kaido are unexpectedly paired up to play doubles 2 against St. Rudolph's Atsushi Kisarazu and Shinya Yanagisawa even though the two have been rivals since they were freshmen. Ironically, however, though they argue with each other, they appear to be a compatible team, who can play on each other's strengths and weaknesses.
30	"Mizuki's Scenario" "Mizuki no Shinario" (観月のシナリオ)	May 8, 2002	April 30, 2007
Though Momoshiro and Kaido are a compatible team, they constantly butt heads in the court, resulting in them struggling as the opponents also know their strengths and weaknesses as well. However, the last-ditch appearance of Kaido's latest technique, the Boomerang Snake, throws Mizuki's carefully laid plans in disarray since he believed that Kaido was unable to perform the technique at will. This also motivates Momoshiro to evolve as well.
31	"The Moon Volley" "Mūnborē" (ムーンボレー)	May 15, 2002	May 7, 2007
Momoshiro knocks out the St. Rudolph player Yanagisawa when his Dunk Smash accidentally hits the player, thus Seigaku wins doubles 2 by default. Eiji and Oishi, the famed Golden Pair, takes to the courts against St. Rudolph's Ichirou Kaneda and its captain, Yoshirou Akazawa. In the match, Mizuki's information helps the St. Rudolph pair tire out Eiji, which is when Oishi reveals his famed technique, the Moon Volley, which can land directly on the baseline.
32	"Mortal Blow: Eiji's Feigned Sleep Attack" "Super Move! Eiji's Pretend to Sleep Attack!? // Hissatsu! Eiji no Neta Furi Kōgeki!?" (必殺!英二の寝たフリ攻撃!?)	May 22, 2002	May 14, 2007
Oishi and Eiji use a new formation that makes use of their exceptional teamwork, but when Eiji runs out of energy, he resorts to regaining his stamina by standing still on the court. In order to give Eiji time to regain his strength, Oishi plays against both the St. Rudolph players by himself. Just when the other pair was about to win, Eiji recovers at match point and saves the ball just in time, thanking his teammate for covering for him.
33	"The Tiebreak" "Taiburēku" (タイブレーク)	May 29, 2002	May 21, 2007
Eiji recovers, and the "Golden Pair" take it to a tiebreaker. However, just when they have a run of three straight points, Eiji starts to lose his stamina again. St. Rudolph fights back and wins the match, but Akazawa accepts that they were lucky, while Mizuki starts to lose confidence in his data and predictions. In the next match, in which Ryoma is pitted against Yuta Fuji, the latter demonstrates his Twist Spin shot against Ryoma.
34	"Twist Spin Shot" "Tsuisutosupinshotto" (ツイストスピンショット)	June 5, 2002	May 29, 2007
Ryoma faces Yuta Fuji, Shusuke's younger brother and also the one rumored to be the lefty-killer, the player who specializes in defeating left-handed opponents. He quickly runs into trouble due to the opponent's tricky Rising shot, which is able to confuse Ryoma due to the ball's unusual motion, but eventually finds a way to counter it. As the match goes, Yuta's reasons for transferring to St. Rudolph from Seigaku is revealed. To prove his worth, Yuta performs his Twist Spin shot.
35	"Drive B" "Doraibu B" (ドライブB)	June 12, 2002	June 4, 2007
With his Rising shot and Twist Spin shot, Yuta is able to dominate the match, but Ryoma continues to find a way to counter the combination. After he advises Yuta to not use his Twist Spin shot anymore, Ryoma unveils his new move, Drive B, a technique that bounces in a B shape, to counter Yuta's technique. With it, Ryoma is able to win the match. The ruthlessness of Mizuki is revealed as he is shown to be the one who taught Yuta the Twist Spin shot, despite knowing that it can cause major damage to the user's arm.
36	"Big Brother, Shusuke Fuji" "Big Brother, Syusuke Fuji // Ani, Fuji Syusuke" (兄, 不二周助)	June 19, 2002	June 11, 2007
Angered by Mizuki's treatment of his younger brother, Fuji decides to teach him a lesson about tennis on the courts. Though Mizuki is confident in the data he has collected on Fuji, which seemingly goes according to his plan at first, the match ends with his complete defeat; Fuji had lost the first five games on purpose. Meanwhile, Fudomine unexpectedly defeats Hyotei Academy three games to zero.

==== Seigaku's Training Saga – Part II (Eps. 37–40) ====
No.	Title	Original release date	English airdate
37	"A Tennis Ball with Ryoma's Face" "Ryōma Jirushi no Tenisubōru" (リョーマ印のテニスボール)	June 26, 2002	June 18, 2007
Nanjiro tricks Ryoma into teaching Sakuno and Tomoka tennis. While trying to teach the two girls tennis, however, Sakuno accidentally disrupts the practice of a school team. In order to help, Ryoma defeats the entire team, not knowing that they are one of Seigaku's next opponents, Ginka. Unbeknownst to them, Yamabuki's Jin Akutsu, who was planning to beat Ginka himself, is observing the entire event.
38	"Penal-Tea" "Penaru Tii!" (ペナル茶!)	July 3, 2002	June 25, 2007
Akutsu wreaks havoc in Seigaku, attacking Kachiro and Arai. Ryoma intervenes, and when Akutsu throws a rock at him, he is able to hit it back with his racket. However, when Akutsu throws several rocks at him, he gets injured in the process. When the regulars later spot Kawamura and Akutsu having a secret meeting, they are surprised to find that the two have known each other since childhood.
39	"The Brown Bear" "Bear Drop! // Higuma Otoshi!" (ヒグマ落とし!)	July 10, 2002	July 2, 2007
During training, the regulars end up running laps. When Inui announces that the last person to cross the finish line has to drink his new drink. Determined not lose, they all end up finishing at the same time. Later, Ryoma and Fuji face off in a practice match, where the two decide to go all out. During the match, Fuji reveals his second Triple Counter, the Higuma Otoshi (Bear Drop), which is able to counter Ryoma's smashes, but the latter is determined to find a way to defeat it.
40	"A Duel in the Rain" "Ame no Naka no Kettō" (雨の中の決闘)	July 17, 2002	July 16, 2007
Through his continuous attempts, Ryoma finally figures out a way to defeat Fuji's counter. Meanwhile, the other regulars continue their own matches, with Tezuka quickly defeating his opponent, Momoshiro. Shortly after, the Seigaku practice matches are cut short due to rain. Unsatisfied with the incomplete match, Fuji and Ryoma continue their duel with each other. However, Ryuzaki puts a stop to it, scolding and lecturing them about the consequences.

==== Tokyo Metropolitan Tournament Saga – Part III: Yamabuki Jr. High (Eps. 41–48) ====
No.	Title	Original release date	English airdate
41	"Trouble!" "Haran!" (波乱!)	July 24, 2002	July 30, 2007
While making their way to their match against Yamabuki, some Fudomine players get into a car accident. Though they make it to their match, the trauma of the accident makes them unable to play at full strength against their opponents. After hearing about the accident from Akutsu, Fudomine's captain, Kippei Tachibana, has his team forfeit the match. Meanwhile, scared of being completely defeated, Seigaku's opponent, Ginka willingly forfeits their match, so Seigaku faces their next opponent, Yamabuki.
42	"Oishi is Targeted" "Oishi Being Targeted // Nerawareta Oishi" (狙われた大石)	July 31, 2002	August 13, 2007
Before their match against Yamabuki, Taichi Dan meets and talks to Ryoma about he [Dan] can not be a good tennis player because he is short, not knowing that Ryoma is a regular. During the doubles match, Oishi is targeted by the "Jimmies", a doubles pair who was victorious over Oishi and a senior the previous year. However, in the end, the Jimmies' overconfidence about their previous win results in Eiji and Oishi's victory.
43	"Lucky Sengoku" "Rakkī Sengoku" (ラッキー千石)	August 7, 2002	August 27, 2007
In the singles match, Momoshiro plays against Kiyosumi Sengoku, who is nicknamed Lucky Sengoku due to his outstanding luck. During the match, though Momoshiro seemingly dominates, he loses focus when Sengoku successfully uses Momoshiro's signature technique, the Dunk Smash. Sengoku then reveals his special technique, a powerful jumping serve called the Tiger Cannon. That, combined with his superb motion vision, allows him to take the lead against Momoshiro.
44	"Jack Knife" "Jyakku Naifu" (ジャックナイフ)	August 14, 2002	September 10, 2007
Desperate to win, Momoshiro inadvertently performs a high level technique called the "Jack Knife" during the match. With it, Momoshiro is able to take the lead, and eventually wins the match with sheer will when he realizes he has a cramped foot. Before his match with Akutsu, Ryoma is warned by his friends about his dangerous opponent, however, Ryoma ends up as the aggressive one when he starts the match out with smashing the ball directly toward Akutsu's face.
45	"A Devil on the Court" "Kōto no ue no Akuma" (コートの上の悪魔)	August 21, 2002	September 24, 2007
When Ryoma hits Akutsu in the face with a ball, Akutsu decides to get serious. Ryoma is then easily overwhelmed by Akutsu's physical power, unique and unpredictable tennis style, and "one in ten years" talent. During their match, Akutsu reminiscences about his time as a member of a tennis club, where he easily and mercilessly defeated its members and captain. Watching the match, Taichi Dan also ends up recalling the first time he had met Akutsu, whom he has admired since that day. Back in the present, Akutsu tells Ryoma that he will not score another point.
46	"Samurai Spirit" "Samurai Tamashii" (サムライ魂)	August 28, 2002	October 8, 2007
Akutsu's unique playing style continues to overwhelm Ryoma. Meanwhile, Kawamura reminiscences about Akutsu's violent history, where Akutsu is shown to have always been talented in physical activities. Though Ryoma believes he has finally found a way to overcome his opponent's unique style and score, Akutsu shows his potential as a tennis player. Despite it, Ryoma's determination allows him to finally score a point against Akutsu. As the match continues, Ryoma is finally able to adjust to Akutsu's style.
47	"I Can't Lose!" "Makerarenai!" (負けられない!)	September 4, 2002	October 20, 2007
Evolving with each and every play, Ryoma holds his own against Akutsu, and finally turns the game around. After a flashback of how coach Banji recruited Akutsu into Yamabuki's tennis club, Banji gives Akutsu some "secret advice" in order to help him get back the advantage after seeing that he is starting to struggle. With it, Akutsu's determination to win in the tennis match increases, forcing back Ryoma once again, though the latter refuses to back down.
48	"The Decisive Moment" "Ketchaku no Toki" (決着の瞬間(とき))	September 11, 2002	November 5, 2007
With Ryoma one point away from winning the match, the two, who are now on even footing, continue to struggle against each other. However, in the end, Ryoma's spirit and overwhelming potential help him win in the match, and would also win Akutsu's grudging respect. To everyone's surprise, Akutsu then announces his retirement from tennis. After the tournament's ceremony, Taichi Dan is inspired to become a tennis player by Akutsu and Ryoma.

==== Intraschool Rankings Saga – Part II (Episodes 49–53) ====
No.	Title	Original release date	English airdate
49	"Free-Style Fighting" "Different Kind of Fight // Ishukaku Tōsen" (異種核闘戦)	September 18, 2002	November 19, 2007
When Rikkai Dai's Akaya Kirihara accidentally stops at the wrong bus stop, he ends up visiting Seishun Academy. While he causes trouble for the Seigaku regulars during practice, the freshmen are stuck doing classroom duties. Horio then gets into trouble with an upperclassman, who is also a basketball player. In order to protect him, Ryoma and the basketball player have a free throw contest, with Ryoma using a tennis ball for a basketball and a broom for a racket. When he wins, he forces the upperclassman to do his remaining classroom duties.
50	"A Seigaku Tradition" "Seigaku's Claim to Fame! // Seigaku Meibutsu!" (青学名物!)	September 25, 2002	December 3, 2007
During the intraschool ranking matches, Momoshiro, Inui, and Tezuka all end up in the same block, meaning that one of them will not become a regular. With the other blocks finishing up, some of the regulars secure their spot on the team. However, when Momoshiro is defeated by both Tezuka and Inui, he ends up being the one knocked off the team. Later, Inui, who has been collecting data on his teammates all this time, attempts a victory over the intractable Tezuka.
51	"Inui's Challenge" "Inui no Chōsen" (乾の兆戦)	October 2, 2002	—
Though the game starts off evenly matched, Inui begins to pull ahead by using his determination, the extra training he has done, and the data he has been gathering on Tezuka since their freshman years. As Tezuka continues to struggle against Inui's Data Tennis, Inui manages to return one of Tezuka's difficult drop shots. However, Tezuka reveals uses a technique that shocks both his opponent and the spectators.
52	"Seigaku's Biggest Crisis" "Seigaku Saidai no Kiki" (青学最大の危機)	October 9, 2002	—
Tezuka uses the "Tezuka Zone", a technique which controls the spin of the ball so it will always return to him, and his "Zero-Shiki drop shot", a shot that rolls backward once it falls on the ground, to defeat Inui. Meanwhile, Momoshiro disappears and temporarily leaves the team causing anxiety within the whole team. When discussing Momoshiro's recent leave, Oishi and Eiji get into an argument when Eiji makes some "insensitive remarks", causing a division in the Golden Pair when they separate to play a doubles match with Kaido and Ryoma.
53	"The Momo Who's Returned" "Kaettekita Momo" (帰ってきた桃)	October 16, 2002	—
Momoshiro recovers his spirit after a match with Fudomine student and Tachibana's younger sister, Ann Tachibana, and also with an encounter with two of Hyotei Academy's regulars. Meanwhile, the Golden Pair makes up, and Tezuka is shown refusing Ryuzaki's offer to study abroad in Germany, choosing to stay in order to lead his team to the Nationals.

=== Seasons 3 and 4: 2002-03 ===
==== Kanto Tournament Saga – Part I: Hyotei Academy (Eps. 54–68) ====
No.	Title	Original release date
54	"Kaoru's Special Training" "Kaoru no Tokkun" (薫の特訓)	October 23, 2002
During the tournament combination drawings, Seigaku learns of their next opponent, Hyotei Academy. Meanwhile, in preparation for Seigaku's next match, Kaido trains especially hard in order to perfect his Boomerang Snake, in which Inui decides to help him with for a price: to become his doubles' partner. Also, Hyotei's rigorous regular selection process is revealed!
55	"Hyotei Presses Near" "Semarikuru Hyōtei" (迫りくる氷帝)	October 30, 2002
Seigaku arrives at the tennis court for their upcoming match, but Shuichiro Oishi is delayed after stopping to help a falling pregnant woman on his way to the match. Takeshi Momoshiro runs to take Oishi's place at the hospital, but discovers Oishi sustained an injury in the process. Oishi pleads with Momoshiro to play in his stead. Ryoma is the sub this time, as due to his small stature, the team feels he may be unable to withstand strong attacks from their opponents.
56	"Doubles for Three" "Sannin no Daburusu" (3人のダブルス)	November 6, 2002
Due Oishi's absence, Momoshiro ends up playing doubles with Eiji Kikumaru, but the latter is unable to play to his fullest. However, once Eiji gets used to Momoshiro's presence, he begins to play in his normal play style. Oishi later shows up to cheer for them on the sidelines, encouraging the two to play to their fullest.
57	"Scud Serve" "Sukaddo Sābu" (スッカドサーブ)	November 13, 2002
After Momoshiro and Eiji beat their opponents, Sadaharu Inui and Kaoru Kaido play against Ryo Shishido and Chotaro Ohtori pair. To start off the match, Ohtori shows them his Scud Serve, a super fast serve verging on 200 km/h. Since the serve was not in Inui's data, the pair has difficulty in trying to return it.
58	"The Worst Compatibility" "Saiaku no Aishō!?" (最悪の相性!?)	November 20, 2002
Neither Inui nor Kaido can react fast enough to Ohtori's Scud Serve. Even after Inui removes his weighted wrist bands; which granted him more speed, still wasn't enough to return the Scud Serve. As the Seigaku pair struggle, Keigo Atobe, Hyotei's captain, reflects back on how hard Shishido and Ohtori trained for this.
59	"The Hidden Trouble" "Akunaki Kodawari" (あくなきこだわり)	November 27, 2002
As Inui reveals that he only needs data on Shishido and Ohtori because he has completed all the others, his past of how he took interest in Data Tennis is revealed. After Inui gathers the required data, Inui and Kaido finally make a comeback. However, even after Kaido reveals he has mastered his Boomerang Snake technique, the other team still proves formidable as they are able to return it, allowing them to secure their win.
60	"Power vs. Power" "Pawā VS Pawā" (パワーVSパワー)	December 4, 2002
Munehiro Kabaji and Takashi Kawamura battle it out with a power duel.
61	"Duel of Hadokyu!" "Hadōkyū Gassen!" (波動球合戦!)	December 11, 2002
Kawamura uses the one and two-handed Hadokyu, but Kabaji copies it. It becomes a duel of whose arm will last longest, which results in both sides sustaining injuries and neither side winning.
62	"The Disappearing Serve" "Kieru Sābu" (消えるサーブ)	December 18, 2002
Shusuke Fuji wants to pay Jirou Akutagawa back for defeating Yuta, and he also wants to win for Kawamura, who was injured along with Kabaji. Fuji thus reveals a very special serve.
63	"The Last Triple Counter" "Saigo no Toripuru Kauntā" (最後のトリプルカウンター)	December 25, 2002
Fuji shows the last of his Triple Counter, Hakugei, and defeats Jirou.
64	"Compilation stories TeniPuri" "Bangaihen Tenipuri" (番外編 てにぷり)	January 8, 2003
Short stories involving super deformed versions of the characters; includes "Super Soldier", "Beware of Snow White?!", and "Jump out! Seigaku".
65	"Become Seigaku's Pillar of Support" "Seigaku no Hashira ni Nare" (青学の柱になれ)	January 15, 2003
Kunimitsu Tezuka, Seigaku's captain, faces off against Atobe, while Oishi reminisces about his promise to Tezuka: they would take Seigaku to the Nationals; and how Tezuka's arm was injured when they were first years.
66	"Rondo Towards Destruction" "Hametsu e no Rondo" (破滅への輪舞曲)	January 22, 2003
Atobe shows his special two-part smash, the Rondo Towards Destruction.
67	"End of the ball" "Saigo no Ikkyū" (最後の一球)	January 29, 2003
Tezuka continues to use his left hand, even though he is aware of the injuries he may further sustain.
68	"The Never Ending Tie-Break" "Owarinaki Taiburēku" (終わりなきタイブレーク)	February 5, 2003
Atobe and Tezuka continue the match, and enters a long tie-break, until Atobe finally wins. Ryoma then plays the last match against Wakashi Hiyoshi, and wins with his Drive B, but also reveals that through watching Tezuka's match he also picked up the Captain's speciality shot. Ryoma also seems to be stronger.

==== Tezuka's Departure saga (Filler eps. 69–75) ====
No.	Title	Original release date
69	"Who Will be a Regular?" "Regyurā no Za wa Dare no Te ni?" (レギュラーの座は誰の手に?)	February 12, 2003
Kachiro Kato, a Seigaku freshman, gets upset with Masashi Arai and his friends for being insensitive to the regulars who have injuries. They battle it out on the courts, and whoever loses has to quit the tennis club.
70	"Tennis vs. Ping Pong" "Tenisu VS Pinpon" (テニスVSピンポン)	February 19, 2003
During Seigaku's club day, Ryoma participates in ping pong, while other members of the team participate in various sports as well. He gets challenged by a prodigy ex-ping pong member.
71	"It's a date!" "Dēto Da!" (デートだ!)	February 26, 2003
Ann Tachibana asks Momoshiro for a date, but Momoshiro forces Ryoma to join too. Inui was nearby and thought these three were a love triangle and calls almost all the regulars to see this. It turned out to be a tennis date at the street tennis court. Kamio sees Ann and Momo and gets jealous, leading to Fuji mistaking the love triangle 'relationship' to a love square 'relationship' – between Momo, Echizen, Kamio and Ann. At the end, players from different schools play doubles match – Ryoma and Shinji Ibu against Akira Kamio and Momoshiro.
72	"Kaoru becomes Ryoma" "Kaoru, Ryōma ni Naru" (薫, リョーマになる)	March 5, 2003
Kaido is forced to impersonate Ryoma due to a mistake in a tennis magazine by Shiba, a reporter, and ends up playing a match with Momoshiro. He also earns himself a few fans.
73	"Tezuka's Decision" "Tezuka no Ketsui" (手塚の決意)	March 12, 2003
Oishi tells everyone to come at midnight for a surprise trip to the mountains. Tezuka later reveals his decision to leave for Germany.
74	"A Message for Echizen" "Echizen he no Messēji" (越前へのメッセージ)	March 19, 2003
Tezuka challenges Ryoma to another match using his right hand, and successfully uses the right-handed Tezuka Zone against him.
75	"Farewell, Tezuka Kunimitsu" "Saraba, Tezuka Kunimitsu" (さらば, 手塚国光)	March 26, 2003
Ryoma finally breaks the Tezuka Zone, but still loses in the end. Tezuka leaves for Germany.

==== Kanto Tournament Saga – Part II: The Quarterfinals – Josei Shonan Jr. High (Eps. 76–85) ====
No.	Title	Original release date
76	"Seigaku vs. Josei Shonan" "Seigaku tai Jōsei Shōnan" (青学対城成湘南)	April 9, 2003
The members of the Josei Shonan team are introduced. Their training techniques are one-of-a-kind. Finally, the match between Seigaku and Josei is starting. The Josei coach tries to scout Ryoma over when they meet near the entrance but is rejected.
77	"Fight of the Calm and the Passionate" "Reisei to Jyōnetsu no Tatakai" (冷静と情熱の戦い)	April 16, 2003
Momoshiro is easily provoked by Josei Shonan's "unit", but gets his act together and makes a comeback. However, when Momo accidentally drinks some of Inui's experimental Juice, Seigaku is forced to forfeit the doubles two game.
78	"Thunderbolt" "Sandāboruto" (サンダーボルト)	April 23, 2003
The "Golden Pair" of Seigaku has to play with a very weird combination of Josei Shonan members in the doubles one match.
79	"I formation" "I (Ai) Fōmēshon" (I (アイ) フォーメーション)	April 30, 2003
The Golden Pair reveals the I Formation, a new formation similar to the Australian Formation, and win the game.
80	"Style of the Pretender" "Puritendā Senbō" (プリテンダーの戦法)	May 7, 2003
Hiroshi Wakato, the copy genius of Josei Shonan, faces off against Kaido, who struggles to overcome Wakato's change-over technique.
81	"Viper vs. Fake Viper" "Mamushi VS Nise Mamushi" (マムシVSニセマムシ)	May 14, 2003
Kaido continues to struggle against Wakato's technique, until he notices the key to Wakato's play style.
82	"Hanamura's Temptation" "Hanamura no Yūwaku" (華村の誘惑)	May 21, 2003
The Kaido/Wakato match goes to a tie-break and Kaido must overcome his fiercest opponent – himself. In the end, Kaido prevails and takes the win.
83	"The Best Masterpiece" "Saikō no Sakuhin" (最高の作品)	May 28, 2003
Singles two – Ryoma Echizen and Reiji Shinjo commences, with Ryoma seemingly heading for an easy victory until Shinjo introduces his Mirage technique. Of course, Ryoma understands this trick after a while and is able to 'seal' this technique. Things seem to go well for Ryoma again but he suddenly gets 'attacked' !
84	"Deep Impulse" "Dīpu Inparusu" (ディープ·インパルス)	June 4, 2003
Shinjo's old aggressive tennis style is revealed. His old style was previously sealed by Josei's coach, Aoi Hanamura, because it injured the opponent, causing him to want to quit tennis. He also injures Ryoma's face a couple of times but Ryoma has his counter-attack ready. Josei regulars are shocked to see Shinjo losing to the chibi freshman from Seigaku.
85	"The Result of the Deadly Duel" "Shitō no Hate" (死闘の果て)	June 11, 2003
Ryoma overcomes the deadly power of Shijo's technique, Deep Impulse, and wins the game. The team then celebrates at Kawamura's sushi restaurant. As promised, losers have to eat wasabi sushi – Inui and Momoshiro in danger!

==== Recreation Saga (Filler eps. 86–90) ====
No.	Title	Original release date
86	"High on Rhythm!" "Rizumu ni High!" (リズムにHigh!)	June 18, 2003
Kiyosumi Sengoku of Yamabuki faces Akira Kamio of Fudomine in a match of attrition.
87	"Prince of Tennis Special!" "Tenisu no Ōjisama Supersharuna!" (テニスの王子様スペシャル!)	June 25, 2003
The Seigaku team goes bowling. Coach Ryuzaki divides the team into six teams of two. Inui introduces his new drink 'Aozu'. He arranged the rules that the gutter balls will be given the shot (a small glass of Aozu) and the loser will be given the whole drink. Everyone is knocked out by Aozu including Fuji (who could resist Inui's Juice). Also he introduces 'Akazu' for the winner.
88	"Prince of Tennis Special!" "Tenisu no Ōjisama Supersharuna!" (テニスの王子様スペシャル!)	June 25, 2003
A short super deformed story, where Inui loses his glasses, follows the bowling fiasco.
89	"Seigaku, Dadada Dan" "Seigaku, Dadada Dan" (青学, ダダダ壇)	July 2, 2003
Taichi Dan of Yamabuki arrives at Seigaku to challenge Ryoma to a match.
90	"Cheap Housing Beach Volleyball" "Bōsō Bīchibarē" (房総ビーチバレー)	July 9, 2003
The Seigaku team goes to the beach, where Sasabe and his father turns up for a beach volleyball challenge against Ryoma and Kaido.

==== Kanto Tournament Saga – Part III: The Semifinals – Rokkaku Jr. High (Eps. 91–97) ====
No.	Title	Original release date
91	"Rokkaku's Freshman Captain" "Rokkaku Chū no Ichinensei Buchō" (六角中の一年生部長)	July 16, 2003
Seigaku's regulars meet Rokkaku Middle School's regulars on their way home, and Kentaro Aoi has a practice match with Ryoma Echizen, revealing Kentaro's great ball control.
92	"The Boy with the Long Racket" "Naga Raketto no Otoko" (長ラケットの男)	July 23, 2003
Harukaze "Bane" Kurobane and Hikaru "Davide" Amane, who has a long racket, have a match against Momoshiro and Kawamura in doubles.
93	"Dash Hadokyu" "Dasshu Hadōkyū" (ダッシュ波動球)	July 30, 2003
Kawamura develops a new technique that knocks out the rackets of their opponent. Though their opponent is surprised and worried about Kawamura's Dash Hadokyu, they find out that Kawamura can only use it once per game, otherwise, it will destroy his wrist.
94	"The Secret Plan to Seal Kikumaru" "Kikumaru Fūji no Hisaku" (菊丸封じの秘策)	August 6, 2003
Eiji's acrobatic play is sealed by Rokkaku's Saeki Kojirō, until he reveals his amazing Seal Step. Unfortunately, Eiji's stamina is drained easily.
95	"Tsubame Gaeshi, Broken" "Tsubame Gaeshi, Yaburetari!" (つばめ返し, 破れたり!)	August 13, 2003
Fuji's Tsubame Gaeshi becomes useless due to Rokkaku's Marehiko Itsuki's ability to hit a sinker, ball with no spin. Fuji then makes Itsuki hit a cord ball, thus creating a slight spin, allowing Fuji to use Tsubame Gaeshi again.
96	"Ryoma, Get Pumped!" "Moero Ryōma!" (燃えろリョーマ!)	August 20, 2003
Ryoma fights Kentaro Aoi in a game that continues for over 3 hours and has to continue to the next day because of the setting sun.
97	"Finishing Smash" "Ketchaku no Sumasshu" (決着のスマッシュ)	August 27, 2003
Ryoma and Aoi can't sleep because they are so pumped up from their game. They both go to the courts and decide to play an unofficial game in the early morning, before the sun is up. When the rest of the Seigaku team arrives at the playing time, they can't find Ryoma and they think something's wrong but then they find him and Aoi fast asleep in the grass with all their stuff. The match continues where it left off and Ryoma manages to win the game by using his Drive B with a slight variation.

==== Recreation Saga before learning about Rikkai Jr. High (Filler eps. 98–101) ====
No.	Title	Original release date
98	"The Prince of Billiards"	September 3, 2003
Fuji exacts his revenge for the previous bowling outing by introducing the team to billiards, only for Ryoma to foil his victory.
99	"The Cursed Racket"	September 10, 2003
Ryoma finds a mysterious racket lying in front of his house and because of it, strange misfortunes happen in Seigaku.
100	"Captain Oishi"	September 17, 2003
In the absence of Tezuka, a tense Oishi puts the team through its paces.
101	"Eat Rikkaidai"	September 24, 2003
Lunch at Kawamura's sushi place; the team watches Fudomine's defeat by Rikkaidai, witnessing Akaya's play that injured Tachibana in the game. The team vows to exact revenge and win.

=== Season 5: 2003–04 ===
Episodes 102–115: Training to Defeat Rikkai Jr. High Saga

Ep. #	Title	Original Release Date
102	"Mizuki's Whispers"	October 1, 2003
Momoshiro and Kaido get tricked into playing a doubles match with Mizuki from St. Rudolph and Kajimoto from Josei Shonan. They were forced to set aside their differences to win or else they would have to leave Seigaku.
103	"Sleepless Night"	October 8, 2003
The night before the big match with Rikkaidai, the Seigaku players realize where they should really be.
104	"Ryoma vs. Sanada"	October 15, 2003
The match with Rikkaidai is suspended for a week due to the rain; nonetheless, Ryoma challenges Genichirō Sanada of Rikkaidai to a match.
105	"Ryoma Utterly Beaten"	October 22, 2003
Ryoma lost to Sanada, he begins sulking and becomes unable to practice to his full potential, its up Akutsu teaches him a lesson and help him realize his mistakes.
106	"Off To The Cottage!"	October 29, 2003
The Seigaku team goes on a training trip. Meanwhile Inoue checks on Seigaku's next opponent, Rikkaidai.
107	"The Captain Appears!"	November 5, 2003
Yamato Yūdai, the previous Captain of Seigaku, shows up for the training camp. He teaches a skeptical Ryoma some valuable lessons about tennis.
108	"Surprise at Camp"	November 12, 2003
A "bear" intrudes upon the training camp, and it's up to the regulars to defeat it and save the hostages. After using a combination of their moves, the "bear" is revealed to be a burglar who has been breaking into the areas' homes.
109	"Tennis Biathlon"	November 19, 2003
A special training session awaits.
110	"Jump, Kabaji!"	November 26, 2003
The Hyotei Academy tennis team shows up for an intensive session with Seigaku. Kikumaru faces off with the genius copycat player Kabaji Munehiro, while Inui faces Hiyoshi Wakashi. Kikumaru eventually wins as Kabaji tires, unable to sustain the copying of Kikumaru's acrobatic play. Inui has tied with Hiyoshi at 6 to 6 games. Hiyoshi thinking he would have won anyway finds Inui tied with him wearing 20 lbs of weight training gear.
111	"Original Prodigy: Fuji Shūsuke"	December 3, 2003
The genius players, Yūshi Oshitari of Hyotei and Shusuke Fuji of Seigaku, face off while Ryō Shishido faces Oishi. The match between Fuji and Oshitari evolves into a battle of Higuma Otoshi and ends with Fuji overcoming Oshitari's Higuma Otoshi and gaining victory. The second match ends as a tie forcing both players to retire from the game.
112	"Hadōkyū vs. Scud Serve"	December 10, 2003
Mukahi Gakuto plays Momoshiro while Ootori Chotarou faces Kawamura.
113	"Atobe the Beautiful"	December 17, 2003
Kaido faces Akutagawa Jirou, while Ryoma faces Keigo Atobe. Kaido eventually uses the Hadōkyū to hit a Boomerang Snake, which knocks out Jirou.
114	"Ryoma is Going!"	December 24, 2003
Atobe sees Ryoma's limitless potential. During this game, Ryoma starts to develop his new move, and he practices it with Oishi after his practice game with Hyotei.
115	"Baseball Game Filled With Men"	January 7, 2004
A chibi episode where the characters play a game of baseball, followed by a Western shootout comedy.

Episodes 116–128: Kanto Tournament Saga – Part IV: The Finals – Rikkai Jr. High

Ep. #	Title	Original Release Date
116–117 [Special Episode]	"Seigaku vs. Champion Rikkaidai! I'll be the One who'll Win!"	January 21, 2004
This is it! After one week's postponement of their match, it's finally here! But Momoshiro and Kaido are missing!
118	"Battle Ceremony"	January 28, 2004
Momoshiro and Kaido vs. Bunta Marui and Jackal Kuwahara.
119	"Tightrope Walking Doubles"	February 4, 2004
Marui's move is revealed. The ball "walks" across the net. In the end, Rikkaidai wins.
120	"Kikumaru Was Read By Niou"	February 11, 2004
Kikumaru is read by Niou, which angers him. The Golden Pair experiences a tension that makes the first half of the game in favor of Rikkaidai.
121	"Yagyuu's Decision"	February 18, 2004
The Golden Pair is able to make a comeback, thanks to Oishi's patience. But in the end the Golden Pair still lose to Rikkaidai.
122	"Inui Hollers"	February 25, 2004
Inui faces his former doubles partner, Renji Yanagi, in a match that will determine who's stronger.
123	"Conclusion of the Remembered"	March 3, 2004
Everybody is surprised when Inui says that he'll forget all his data, only to find out that he actually didn't. Renji is manipulated by Inui, who makes their match from before continue.
124	"Kirihara's Red Trap"	March 10, 2004
The genius of Seigaku, Shūsuke Fuji, faces Rikkaidai's Akaya Kirihara. A battle of an 'Angel' against a 'Demon'. Kirihara intentionally injures Fuji's right knee.
125	"Angry Fuji"	March 17, 2004
Kirihara continues to injure Fuji. Tachibana arrives despite his injury (also dealt by Kirihara) and cheers Fuji on. However, when Kirihara attempts to injure Tachibana again, Fuji finally becomes angry at Kirihara's sadistic style of tennis and unleashes his potential on Kirihara and tells him that "tennis must not be used as a tool to breed hatred." Though being told he should go to the hospital, Fuji insists on staying for the next match to support his teammate.
126	"Clash! Ryoma vs. Sanada"	March 24, 2004
The deciding game!! Sanada's invisible swing initially pushed back Ryoma, putting him at a disadvantage. Ryoma hasn't won in 3 games, but he gains advantage by using a new move called "Cyclone Smash", holding Sanada back.
127	"Invisible Serve"	March 31, 2004
Having all his moves sealed, Ryoma can only use his "Cyclone Smash". However, having used it repeatedly while enduring Sanada's serves caused him to tire out and his eyes to hurt, so he continued the match with his eyes closed. Pushed by the need to fight for Yukimura (Rikkaidai's captain), Sanada uses his "Invisible Serve", a move that effectively hides his swing and the path of the ball.
128	"Conclusion ~ Which One will Win?"	April 7, 2004
Ryoma, after temporarily losing his morale due to not being able to return the "Invisible serve", eventually starts to feel the pressure from his peers and challengers. This, along with his desire not to lose, pushes him to go into the State of Self-Actualization and uses the techniques of other players. Rikkaidai loses the game and heads to the Nationals as runner-up. When they go to Kawamura's sushi place to celebrate, coach Ryuzaki comes with news that Rikkaidai's captain Yukimura Seiichi's surgery is successful.

Opening & Ending Music

Season	OP/ED	Song Title	Artist	Episode
Season 5	OP	Fly High	Toshihiko Matsunaga	102-128
Season 5-6	ED	Sakura	Yomu Hamaguchi	102–139

=== Season 6: 4/2004 – 12/2004 ===
Episodes 129–135: Recreation Saga

Ep. #	Title	Original Release Date
129	"The Samurai's Ballad"	April 14, 2004
The story of Nanjiro Echizen and how he met his wife, Rinko Takeuchi. We see a bit of story behind why he retires abruptly from tennis.
130	"We Want To See Tezuka!"	April 21, 2004
The team visits Tezuka in Germany. Tezuka brings them around the city; however, some of them got split up. Ryoma ends up playing a match with a lady that turns out to be Tezuka's trainer.
131	"Never Give Up"	April 28, 2004
Thanks to Ryoma's persistence in playing, the lady, Hannah Essenheimer, found her will to return to professional tennis.
132	"The Zany Teni-Puri Family"	May 5, 2004
A chibi Tenipuri Family episode where Ryoma is featured as the eldest son, Momoshiro as the younger daughter (Momoko) and Kaido as the youngest son. Also includes Oishi as the mother (Shuko), Inui as the father, Fuji and Tezuka as Grandmother and Grandfather and Kikumaru as the Family Cat.
133	"The Best Sushi Chef in Japan"	May 12, 2004
Kawamura's father, the sushi chef, was injured, and Kawamura has to do his part in the shop along with a troubled man named Gen.
134	"My Prince"	May 19, 2004
Kurumi, a young and insecure girl who has lost her will to pursue her dream, becomes infatuated with Fuji and gets a date from him. Meanwhile, Momoshiro, Ryoma and Kikumaru befriend the person who unwittingly crushed little Kurumi's illusions... her own little sister Narumi.
135	"Kikumaru's Summer Vacation"	May 26, 2004
Kikumaru won a contest to have his popular idols, the Chocolates J-Pop idol group, visit his house. The problem is, his teammates keep showing up.

Episodes 136–146: Junior Selection Camp Saga

Ep. #	Title	Original Release Date
136	"Junior Selection Camp, Gathered"	June 2, 2004
28 players from several of the surrounding schools have gathered at a camp to decide the 8 people who will be representing Japan against the American team. They are soon divided into three different groups.
137	"The Member Who was not Trusted"	June 9, 2004
Kamio is accused of a misdeed and sets out to find the real culprit.
138	"Ryoma vs. Kirihara! Beyond Battle Rage"	June 16, 2004
The real culprit of the misdeed is revealed – it's Ann-chan! Also, Kirihara claims he has changed, but can he prove it?
139	"Sengoku Kiyosumi Reborn"	June 23, 2004
Sengoku shows us his new style of play, a sport inside of a sport, also known as boxing! To do so, he challenges Momoshiro to a match, winning 6–3. Ryuzaki-sensei falls ill and must be hospitalized.
140	"Welcome Back, Tezuka Kunimitsu (NB. 140 and 141 were originally aired as a 1 hour special)"	June 30, 2004
Ryuzaki-sensei got ill! Tezuka returns to Japan to be the temporary coach and is accepted by the team after he proves himself worthy by playing Sengoku, Shishido and Ōtori using the Tezuka Zone and incredible returns. Atobe and company sang the song "Wonderful Days".
141	"The Ultimate Showdown"	June 30, 2004
Atobe and Sanada have a match. The two were quite energetic and wanted to prove something. It's all because of Tezuka's presence.
142	"The Boy who Came from America"	July 7, 2004
The arrival of the American team's Kevin Smith has shown up looking for Ryoma. Unable to find him, he challenges other Jr. Highs, leaving a message, for Ryoma, behind each school he passes. Meanwhile, at camp, Tezuka puts Shishido and Oishi against Ootori and Kikumaru in a doubles match.
143	"Tezuka's Choice"	July 14, 2004
Tezuka has been thinking about his choice for the Invitational Team and has come to a rather very difficult decision.
144	"Formation! A Dream Team"	July 21, 2004
Finally! The Team composed of the best players are selected! While this is happening, Akutsu and Kevin are having a battle.
145	"Ryoma and Kevin"	July 28, 2004
After being ceased by Tezuka from having a match with Kevin, Ryoma tries to find Kevin the next day.
146	"The American Team's Ambition"	August 4, 2004
The U.S. team introduces themselves in public!

Episodes 147–160: Junior Selection Team vs. U.S. Coast Team Saga

Ep. #	Title	Original Release Date
147	"The Strongest! Atobe and Sanada"	August 18, 2004
Atobe and Sanada are paired for doubles and although they lack coordination they are able to show the U.S. team their power.
148	"Baker's Scenario"	August 25, 2004
Cassidy and Lee of the U.S. team finish observing Atobe and Sanada and reveal their true power.
149	"Tango Towards Destruction"	September 1, 2004
Atobe and Sanada finally play as a doubles pair, conquering their lack of coordination and winning the match.
150	"Gorgeous Guys' Duo"	September 8, 2004
Kikumaru and Oshitari are up against the Griffey Brothers while behind the scenes Mr. Baker demands that their performance be an exciting show for the sponsors.
151	"Sorrowful Marionettes"	September 15, 2004
Mr. Baker orders the Griffey Brothers to lose their match on purpose, however, after witnessing how determined and earnest Kikumaru is, they remember how fun tennis is and end up winning the match.
152	"Bobby Max The Beast"	September 22, 2004
Bobby, a very physically powerful tennis player of the U.S. team, is up against Sengoku, who seems helpless in the face of Bobby's brute strength.
153	"A Battle to the Limits"	September 29, 2004
Sengoku manages to oppress Bobby's strength with his own technique, slowly evening out the scores. The match turns into a battle of endurance resulting in both of them collapsing and neither of them winning.
154	"The Prodigy Vs. Tennis Machine (NB. 154 & 155 were originally aired as a 1 hour special)"	October 6, 2004
Fuji vs. the U.S. team's "Tennis Machine" Arnold – someone who could accurately hit the ball at the places he wanted.
155	"1 mm Battle"	October 6, 2004
A very close battle between Fuji and Arnold! Fuji secures another win with Tsubame Gaeshi and Higuma Otoshi.
156	"Who Will Play?"	October 13, 2004
Akaya vs. Kevin Smith. Akaya has developed the Phantom Ball, which is to be used against left handers. The first games are dominated by Akaya until he crashes into the net pole after hitting another Phantom Ball.
157	"The Phantom Ball that Vanished"	October 20, 2004
Akaya's shoulder injury prevents him from hitting many Phantom Balls, and it finally becomes too much for him to keep on playing. Ryoma takes his place and continues playing from the current score.
158	"The Long Awaited Confrontation – Ryoma vs. Kevin"	October 27, 2004
Ryoma takes Kirihara's place on the court. After discovering that Kevin copied most of his techniques, Ryoma uses the Cyclone Smash, which Kevin did not have a chance to copy, and reverses the score.
159	"Illusion"	November 3, 2004
Kevin debuts his original move, Illusion, and the game goes into tie-break. However, Ryoma manages to counter it by watching the shadow of the tennis ball.
160	"Game and Match"	November 10, 2004
A very nice match between the two rivals! A match that touches the hearts of the audience: the rivalry between Kevin and Ryoma turns into friendship.

Episodes 161–165: Recreation Saga

Ep. #	Title	Original Release Date
161	"Run, Momo!"	November 17, 2004
Momoshiro treated Ryoma for lunch, but something happened that he must pay 10,000 yen before the time limit ends! He leaves Ryoma at the store to insure that he will come back to finish off the payment or Momo and Ryoma's chance at the national tournament is being threatened with a call to the cops for them not paying for the food.
162	"The Golden Pair's Memories"	December 1, 2004
The Golden pair's memories on how they became friends and eventually became a doubles pair.
163	"Kaido's Unknown World"	December 8, 2004
Kaido loses his memory by trying to save Ryoma from a certain head and face injury. Ryoma and Momoshiro try to get his memory back by playing a match against Kaido and Yuuta that sparks a really good side of him, and he gains back his memory in the end!
164	"Seigaku's Shocking Secret Plans"	December 15, 2004
Ryuzaki-sensei will be out of the hospital soon. The Seigaku tennis club wants to surprise her when she comes back. Also, another very surprising thing happens.
165	"The Tenipuri Family Goes to Hawaii?! – Christmas at the Tenipuri Family"	December 22, 2004
A cute chibi episode of the Seigaku family having their Christmas vacation.

Opening & Ending Music

Season	OP/ED	Song Title	Artist	Episode
Season 6	OP	Shining	Yuki Shirai	129–153
Season 6	OP	Paradise	Yuki Shirai	154–165
Season 6	ED	Sakura	Yomu Hamaguchi	129–139
Season 6	ED	Wonderful Days	Pull Tab to Can	140 – 165 [From www.beepthegeek.net]

=== Season 7: 1/2005 – 3/2005 ===
Episodes 166–176: Intraschool Rankings Saga – Part III

Ep.#	Title	Original Release Date
166	"Seigaku's Specialty, again"	January 12, 2005
Kawamura vs. Oishi showdown.
167	"Eternal Rivals, Momoshiro Vs. Kaido"	January 19, 2005
Intraschool ranking match again! It's getting tense because Ryoma, Momoshiro and Kaido all belong to the same block. It's Momoshiro vs. Kaido as the highlight of the afternoon match.
168	"Ryoma's Decision (NB. 168 & 169 were originally aired as a 1 hour special)"	January 26, 2005
Ryoma confronts his father about his invitation to the US Open. Also, Kikumaru vs. Inui! Inui's eye is revealed for the first time!
169	"Wavering Feelings"	January 26, 2005
Ryoma couldn't think well because of the US Open, and the Nationals are coming near. He declines the US Open offer to Ryuzaki-sensei but many of the Seigaku club members thinks he should take the one in a lifetime chance. What will he do?
170	"Be Passionate, Echizen!"	February 2, 2005
Still about the US Open. Ryoma is about to decide. Ryoma and Momo are having a match and Momo is already full-going from the start while Ryoma seems to be distracted giving Momoshiro the game by forfeiture.
171	"To my Dear Friend"	February 9, 2005
Momoshiro is still angry with Ryoma. Meanwhile, Ryoma is moping and having conflicting feelings about going to the U.S. Open. Eventually, the two make up and play a friendly match. Even though Ryoma wins, Momoshiro technically wins for the block. However, Momoshiro urges Ryoma to take the opportunity and go to the U.S. Open. Finally having made up his mind, Ryoma decides to accept the offer.
172	"Goodbye Seigaku"	February 16, 2005
Ryoma is about to leave Japan for the US Open. Everybody is doing something for Ryoma.
173	"Samurai in New York"	February 23, 2005
Ryoma Echizen at New York at last! He's adjusting to the place and he even met with Kevin Smith there and played tennis with him.
174	"Tezuka Kunimitsu Vs. Fuji Syusuke"	March 2, 2005
Tezuka and Fuji have a match to determine Seigaku's number one in the intraschool ranking. This match, which lasts until episode 176, truly awakens Fuji's full potential as a tennis player. Flashbacks reveal a match between the two when they were first years, their subsequent friendship, and the implications of Tezuka's injury. Fuji takes an early lead, but the match is far from over.
175	"Seriousness in the Third Year"	March 9, 2005
Tezuka and Fuji's match intensifies as they each gradually begin to reveal their best moves (Tezuka's Zero-Shiki Drop/Tezuka Zone and Fuji's Triple Counters). Tezuka slowly begins to surpass Fuji. As he begins to struggle, Fuji reminisces about their first year match (which included the promise of a rematch) and their developing friendship. He then realizes that he is afraid of finding out the results of both of them playing to their full potential and that this is quite possibly the last match they will ever have against each other, and he concludes that if he doesn't play his hardest, he will regret it. His hits suddenly get sharper, and Tezuka comments that the true Fuji has awakened.
176	"Climax"	March 16, 2005
Once Fuji starts playing his hardest, Tezuka starts to get pushed back. With heart and soul completely in the match, the two battle at their hardest. Tezuka wins by using Zero-Shiki Drop Shot with his right hand while in mid-air, surprising Fuji and everyone else.

Episodes 177–178: Start of Nationals Arc

Ep.#	Title	Original Release Date
177	"Unforgettable Promise (NB. 177 & 178 were originally aired as a 1 hour special)"	March 23, 2005
Ryoma goes back to Japan to play a game with Tezuka because he wants to put an end to the rivalry that he left so he can mentally move on to the US Open.
178	"Goodbye, Prince"	March 30, 2005
Last episode of the series, which shows how Ryoma defeated Tezuka. The Opening Rites of The All-Japan Nationals are also shown.

Opening & Ending Music

Season	OP/ED	Song Title	Artist	Episode
Season 7	OP	Dream Believer	Osami Masaki	166–178
Season 7	ED	Little Sky	Kentaro Fukushi	166–177
Season 7	ED	Future (long version)	HIRO-X	178

== OVAs ==
- A Day at the Survival Mountain – Special episode of the anime series shown at Jump Festa 2003.

=== National Tournament ===
==== National Tournament ====
OVA series Episodes 1–13: The Nationals Arc

Ep. #	Title	Original Release Date
1	"Return of the Prince"	March 24, 2006
First match of All-Japan National Tournament: Rokkaku vs. Higa. Ojii explains the Shukuchi Method, and Ryoma comes back from America!
2	"Hot and Cool"	May 26, 2006
Seigaku's first round's matches start with Higa Middle School. Ryoma faces Kei Tanishi (Big Bang serve), and shows his souvenir from America – the Cool Drive, as well as Drive C, a less powerful version of the Cool Drive!
3	"The Fourth Counter"	May 26, 2006
Fuji and Kawamura play together in the Doubles 2 match. During the match, Higa's coach signals his player to attack Ryuzaki-sensei with the ball. Fuji and Kawamura get angry at this and start playing at full force. However, it's not that easy because of the Shukuchi Method. Fuji uses his Fourth Counter: Kagerou Zutsumi, a.k.a. Dragonfly Illusion.
4	"Kikumaru All Alone"	July 28, 2006
Kikumaru plays Singles 2 against Kai from Higa. During the game, it is shown how hard Kikumaru had trained to raise his stamina. His lateral movement has improved so much that it looks like there are two Kikumarus. This motion is called Seal Step, and it looks as if he has a doppelganger.
5	"The Longest Summer"	July 28, 2006
Rikkai Dai's Yagyuu meets Kaido and asks him what he would do without his Snake. Kaido then asks Inui to let him play Doubles by himself and see how far he could go without his signature move.
6	"The Man Called Killer"	September 22, 2006
Tezuka plays against Higa Chuu's Captain, Eishirou Kite. Kite shows that he would do anything to win, even throwing small pebbles at Tezuka. Tezuka shows everyone his true form using Hyaku Ren Jitoku no Kiwami – The Pinnacle of Hard Work.
7	"The Prince of Beach-Volleyball?!"	September 22, 2006
In between matches: Seigaku is now a beach-volleyball team and plays with Rokkaku before training for the next match.
8	"Premonition Before the Storm"	November 24, 2006
Hyotei reminisces about their loss at the Kantou tournament and strive to win the quarterfinals against Seigaku. Also, Kintaro arrives at the tournament and meets with Echizen at the stadium.
9	"Heart Not Giving In"	November 24, 2006
The first match in the quarterfinals is Oshitari vs. Momoshiro! Momoshiro in the Singles 3 Spot shows off his new style of play, but eventually loses because Momo's spirit awakens Oshitari's.
10	"Short-lived Match"	January 26, 2007
Doubles 2, the second match of the quarterfinals: Inui-Kaido pair vs. Mukahi-Hiyoshi pair. In a try for a short match against Inui and Kaido, Mukahi and Hiyoshi play with all they've got from the beginning. Inui reveals a new move at the start. When Mukahi and Hiyoshi are at match point, Kaido shows a new move!
11	"Tezuka Kunimitsu"	January 26, 2007
Tezuka vs. Kabaji in Singles 2 of the quarterfinals. An untold history about Tezuka in the Kyûshu Region before his rehabilitation is shown. In the present time, can Tezuka stand up to Kabaji's imitation of himself?
12	"Two Of Us"	March 23, 2007
A duel of the Golden Pairs: Kikumaru-Oishi vs. Shishido-Ootori. Ootori's improved Neo Scud Serve & the Pile-Mirage formation puts Seigaku's Golden Pair to the test! But the Golden Pair achieves a new state: Synchro! However, the win goes to Hyotei as Kikumaru "prevents" Oishi from hitting the ball further and causing more injury to his wrist.
13	"Deathmatch · King vs. Prince"	March 23, 2007
In Singles 1, Ryoma faces Atobe to see who advances to the semi-finals of the national tournament. Ryoma uses the State of Self-Actualization, but it is useless against Atobe and his new move, "Koori no Sekai". But Ryoma counters Koori no Sekai with an incomplete version of his father's "Zone" technique, which is the same as the "Tezuka Zone". Eventually, the two go into what seems like a never-ending tie-break.

==== National Semifinals ====
OVA series Episodes 14–19: The Nationals Semifinal Arc

Ep. #	Title	Original Release Date
14	"Fudoumine vs. Shitenhouji Battle"	June 22, 2007
End of Singles 1 match between Hyotei and Seigaku. Shintenhouji faces Fudoumine to see who advances to the semi-finals, and Ryoma meets face-to-face with his new rival.
15	"Roar"	June 22, 2007
The Singles 3 match between Fuji and Shiraishi is played. Fuji's Triple Counters fail against Shiraishi's perfect "Bible" tennis, and everything seems to go downhill for Seigaku. As the match moves on, Fuji evolves the Triple Counters and also produces a new final counter called Hecatoncheires no Monban (Gate Keeper of Hecatonchires), which prevents the returned ball from going over the net. However, in the end, Shiraishi's cunning mind finds a way to hit the ball over the net, bringing the game to a tie break. Things go evenly until Fuji lobs the ball out of desperation. Despite all the effort of both players, the point is decided by a centimeter. It is noted in the following episode when Kawamura says he has never seen Fuji in such a state before.
16	"The Horror of Amusing Tennis"	September 28, 2007
Doubles 2 with the Momo-Kaido pair. The game favors Shitenhouji thanks to the Amusing tennis style of the Koharu-Hitouji pair, provoking stress on Seigaku's pair. However, Momo comes up with a clever strategy that surpasses the pair, giving Seigaku the win.
17	"Seigaku's Dead Weight"	September 28, 2007
Kawamura plays against Gin, the original creator of the Hadoukyuu, from Shitenhōji. Gin has 108 levels of Hadoukyuu. Kawamura is not able to return even one shot and loses 0–5 games and 0–40 points. After Akutsu awakens him, Kawamura realizes that he must give his all even if he knows he will lose. He then continues and puts his heart and soul into his final shot, what he calls the 'Final Hadoukyuu', which is stronger than Gin's 108 Hadoukyuu styles. Attempting to return Kawamura's shot, Gin injures his wrist severely. Kawamura wins the match by default and he reaches his dream of being the Number One power player of the Nationals!
18	"The Two Doors"	January 25, 2008
Doubles 1 turns into a singles match when Tezuka and Chitose decide to duke it out. Inui and Zaizen step aside for their teammates. After Chitose takes the first game with his "Saiki Kanpatsu no Kiwami", Tezuka decides to show Chitose his true power, revealing that he has opened the 2nd door of Muga No Kyōchi. In the end, Tezuka wins with a victory of 6–1. Meanwhile Rikkaidai has a few problems with their opponent Nagoya, and Akaya Kirihara, drenched in blood, has been hit all the way back to fence, making a huge dent...
19	"One-Point Match"	January 25, 2008
Seigaku wins the match with Shintenhouji and moves on to the finals. Meanwhile, Rikkaidai's Akaya Kirihara transforms into a demon as they turn around from there to win and face Seigaku in the finals—it is revealed by Rikkaidai's members that they lost the first two matches on purpose to prove Akaya's true potential. Kintarō, unwilling to wait one year to be able to challenge Ryoma again—or Koshimae, as Kintarō calls him—asks Ryoma for a one-point match. In the end the ball splits into half, each half on one side of the court, turning the over-40 minutes match into a draw..

==== National Finals ====
OVA series Episode 20–26: The National Tournament Finals Arc

Ep. #	Title	Original Release Date
20	"The Prince of Yakiniku"	April 25, 2008
Hyoutei, Shitenhouji, Higa, Seigaku and Rokkaku decide to take a break before the finals, and decide to eat Yakiniku. Here, Eiji jumps to host a Yakiniku eating along with Oshitari Yuushi from Hyotei. Along with the comedies of Inui's pants getting pulled off by Tezuka and heaps of bodies of players from said schools, the players end the night with a ¥1,274,960 bill, along with a ¥63,748 tax.
21	"Summit Showdown!"	July 25, 2008
Three years ago, after finishing runner up to Yukimura in the Japanese junior tournament, a new player emerged, beating Sanada 6–0, 6–1, only to play evenly with Yukimura. Three years later, the rematch between Tezuka Kunimitsu and Sanada Genichirou. Just as Tezuka sealed doors one and two of the Muga no Kyochi, Sanada sealed the "Lightning" and "Shadow" until he faced Tezuka. Having no answer, Tezuka risked his future, and arm, with the Tezuka Phantom, reversing the spin and forcing the balls out instead of towards him. Tezuka's arm begins to feel the effects as well as Sanada's legs from constantly hitting the Lightning. Yukimura forces Sanada to change his strategy for the sake of three championships for Rikkaidai, using the Lightning and Forest techniques against the Phantom. Tezuka has no choice but to hit the Phantom, wearing his arm out until Sanada gains match point. With one final Lightning, instead of using the Phantom, Tezuka utilizes the Tezuka Zone to bring it towards him. It blew the racquet out of his hand, but the ball flew high into the air and landed on the net cord, teetering on the edge. With everyone watching, Sanada screamed for it to fall on Tezuka's side, which it did, resulting in Rikkaidai's win. Sanada shook hands with Tezuka, saying he'll never play him again.
22	"The Way We Play"	TBA
Doubles 2 of the finals: Inui-Kaido pair vs. Yanagi-Kirihara pair. Inui's best data and Kaido's Tornado Snake are ineffective against Rikkaidai's pair. Inui seems ready to give up, but Kaido uses Yagyuu's Laser Beam. Kirihara transforms into a demon, purposely aiming at Inui and injuring him severely. Kaido turns into a demon himself, but was stopped by Inui. Soon after that, Inui collapses, Seigaku forfeits the match, and Inui is rushed to the hospital. This episode is when Ryoma loses/lost his memory.
23	"Can you see the Stars in Broad Daylight!?"	October 24, 2008
During the Singles 2 match between Fuji and Niou, Niou uses an illusory movement to transform into Tezuka. Aside from the appearance, he also has the ability to copy his signature techniques and playstyle. While Fuji is able to get out of the illusion, Niou creates yet another one, this time being Shiraishi the copied. It was a very close match,7–5, Fuji wins the match with his new technique, Hoshi Hanabi.
24	"The Only One in my Heart"	October 24, 2008
As the Golden Pair plays against Marui and Jackal in the Doubles 1 slot, players whom Ryoma had beaten before help him to recover his memory. It is also revealed how Ryoma lost his memories on a trip with his dad. In the meantime, Toyama Kintarou challenges Rikkaidai's captain, Seiichi Yukimura, to a single-balled match just to make time for Ryoma to return. But finally, the Golden Pair wins the game for Seigaku, and all hope of winning is directed to Ryoma's match.
25	"The Prince vs. The Child of God"	January 23, 2009
After Ryoma recovers his memories, he returns to the field court for his final match against Yukimura, just to find a completely crushed Kintarou, whom Ryoma had a hard time against. How far do Yukimura's abilities extend to?!
26	"Dear Prince~ To the Princes of Tennis."	January 23, 2009
After many hardships and suffering, Ryoma unlocks the final Muga gate, Teni Muhō No Kiwami (Pinnacle of Perfection), and defeats Yukimura with incredible moves. Seigaku wins the Nationals! In the end, we see the Freshmen Trio (now Juniors) along with Momoshiro being the new vice captain and Kaido being the new captain. Tezuka plans to go to Germany to become better. Sakuno is carrying a red tennis racket and saying that cherry trees are blooming. We then see Ryoma in America about to beat another pair of tennis gangsters.

=== Another Story ===
OVA series Episode 1–4: ~Messages from Past and Future~

Ep. #	Title	Original Release Date
1	"The Prince of Naniwa"	May 26, 2009
After the Nationals, Seigaku goes on a trip to Osaka for the purpose of training with Shitenhouji where they bump into the Higa club members. Afterwards, they go sightseeing and at the same time, talk about their futures. Meanwhile, back in America, Ryoma re-encounters with Ryoga, whom he sees training in a slum.
2	"Turbulence, The Young Atobe"	May 26, 2009
The story of Hyoutei's Third year regulars when they first entered middle school.
3	"The Prince of Naniwa, The Second Act"	May 27, 2009
When Momoshiro and Kaido lose their cool while training the first and second years and Ryoma returns from America to Osaka.
4	"The legend of Rikkai, A Rebel who Challenges an Emperor"	October 25, 2009
A flashback to when Kirihara first joins Rikkadai and challenges the last years winning regulars of the national tournament so that he can become number one. He loses to Rikkai's Big Three, but he vows to beat them.

=== Another Story II ===
OVA series Episode 1–4: ~The Times We Shared~

Ep. #	Title	Original Release Date
1	"Born! Captain Shiraishi Kuranosuke"	August 26, 2011
This is a self-contained story telling the growth of Shintenhouji's tennis club. It covers the arrival of Zaizen and also the making of Shiraishi's Entaku shot.
2	"The seven horrible mysteries of Seishun Gakuen"	August 26, 2011
Ryoma and the other first-years of Seigaku Tennis Club join Momoshiro and Kaidou in a scary story telling session. They touch upon the 7 Mysteries of Seigaku; Fuji later joins and takes over the narration of how they came to be.
3	"The Two Wings of Kyushuu"	October 26, 2011
A story that flashbacks to the days when Tachibana and Chitose were team-mates and how their remarkable tennis skills earned them this nickname.
4	"Jirou's Awakening"	October 26, 2011
So what does it take to get the sleeping prince of Hyoutei to wake up? Entrusted by Atobe with this task, Gakuto and Oshitari follows Jirou after training to find out.

== The Prince of Tennis II ==
Episodes 1–13: ~2nd stringers arc~

#	Title	Original Release Date
1	"The Return of the Prince"	January 4, 2012
Seigaku and other middle school students (with a total of 50 middle school students) are invited to the U-17 selection camp, including Ryoma who comes back from America to participate.
2	"The Gatekeeper of Hell"	January 11, 2012
Momoshiro gets paired up immediately in a shuffle match, being the first middle schooler to do so. His opponent is Jujiroh Oni, introduced in the previous episode. Jujiroh plays with a 2-string racquet, and causes both of Momo's wrists to be shot with his specialty, Black Jack Knife. Momoshiro refused to forfeit but lost in the end, 6–0.
3	"Friendly Fire"	January 18, 2012
The middle schoolers paired up with friends, and find out that they will be playing singles tie-breaker matches against their partner. Kikumaru and Oishi's match is most focused on, and Kikumaru is trying to prolong the match because it will be the last chance he has to play with Oishi. Trying to find out where Court 1 is, Ryoma defeated a bunch of high schoolers. After beating countless high schoolers, he finally finds Tokugawa of Court 1, and is about to play a match with him.
4	"The Captain's Choice"	January 25, 2012
More matches are played, Tezuka vs. Kaido and Atobe vs. Hiyoshi. Both captains have a plan from the start to teach their juniors a lesson before defeating them. Meanwhile, Ryoma and Kintarō are playing matches with Tokugawa and Oni.
5	"Winners and Losers"	February 1, 2012
The matches continued at Court 1, with Oni vs. Kintarou and Tokugawa vs. Ryoma. At the main court, the rest of the middle schoolers played against their favorite partner. Those who lost were forced to leave the camp, while the winners remained. What happens now?
6	"Cliffs of the Heart"	February 8, 2012
The winning middle school team have now started the next stage of their hard training right away, which consisted of complex combinations of exercises. Ryoma and Kintarou joined the other losers in facing together the biggest challenge of their lifetime given to them by the mental coach, Saitou, since becoming the only middle school tennis teams ever invited throughout Japan: to reach the top of a very high and steep mountain in order to prove their strength, will and power, and to close the gap between themselves and the winners. But, what awaits Ryoma, Kintarou and the losing team up there is either a heavenly paradise, or a blazing hell they surely will never forget.
7	"Start from Zero"	February 15, 2012
The losers finally reached the peak of the mountain. There they met a drunkard coach in primitive clothing, who was seen drinking a wine bottle amidst a bunch of worn out boys lying all over the ground. During the next days, the team had to start from zero and faced a series of raw challenges coming from this man that were so different compared to what they have always been doing before. Plus, they have to do all these without the pride of wearing their favorite school jerseys! Question now is, can they make it to the end, as what they had promised to each other with Sanada?
8	"Special Mission"	February 22, 2012
Ryoma, Tanishi, and Kenya receive a letter from Coach Nyudo asking them to sneak into the training camp to acquire training supplies as well as Sake for Coach Nyudo. However, the place is completely filled with high-tech security devices and they are unwilling to go. Coach Nyudo pushes them through, but the question is: can they take the heat?
9	"Evolution and Change"	February 29, 2012
The middle schoolers, once again, have to face the challenging demands of Coach Mifune. This time, they must keep each of their balloons safe from an eagle, and no allowing the bird to pop their balloon. The middle schoolers also realize how much they have improved from the rigorous training.
10	"Farewell, Kunimitsu Tezuka"	March 7, 2012
At the training camp in the mountains, the middle schoolers are given rackets filled with lead and are forced to hit balls with the rackets. Meanwhile, in the U-17 camp, Court 5 are having team shuffle matches with Court 3. Tezuka is having a match with Yudai Yamato, Seigaku's former captain. Yamato tells Tezuka not to put anymore pressure on his arm, as he may go through intense pain in rehabilitation like Yamato did. Tezuka finally smiles, and acquires the "Pinnacle of Perfection" and wins against Yamato. Echizen came to watch the match halfway through.
11	"Promise"	March 14, 2012
Tezuka is leaving when Fuji challenges him to a match. Meanwhile a doubles game is going on in between court 5 and court 3. Both battles end, with Tezuka winning the match with Fuji and court 3 winning the doubles match against court 5. The singles game will decide the winner, court 3 or court 5? Irie and Atobe go at it and Atobe is winning when Irie's deception is revealed. Atobe is losing horribly but his determination pull him through towards a tie-breaker. In the end both Irie and Atobe are unable to play any longer after ending at more than 187 points each. The episode ends with an announcement that the next singles match will decide the court shuffle winners and Oni standing and going toward the court.
12	"The Start Of A Revolution"	March 21, 2012
The people at the training camp in the mountains had to do special test where they had to run a special path while having tennis balls shoot at them.. In the test, Ryoma was able to hit more tennis balls at once. At the end, the path led to a storage cabin where there were black jerseys that looked like that ones that people in the training camp wore. The Black Jerseys then challenge court 2 at U-17
13	"Toward Your New Brilliant Selves"	March 28, 2012
The Black Jerseys return from the mountain. They challenge court 2 in a heated match. The Black Jerseys show an incredible improvement in their abilities, thanks to the intense training at the mountains. The Black Jerseys defeat everyone with ease, and soon Ryoma faces Migihashi, the captain of court 2. Migihashi employs a technique called "God's Domain", and it utilizes the spin of the ball so that it always draws back to him, much like the Tezuka Zone. Migihashi claims that Ryoma will not be able to send the ball past the right side of the court. They began to add the number of balls from 1 to 8 to 9. However, Ryoma was not able to return 9 balls. Ryoma then returns 9 balls at once, to which he then adds another ball. Migihashi is unable to return all of them, and thus Ryoma wins. The Black Jerseys are now promoted to court 2. In the evening, the students from court 3 and court 2 have matched with each other. Ryoma also has a match with Tokugawa by using multiple tennis balls.

Season	OP/ED	Song Title	Artist	Episode
The Prince of Tennis II	OP	Mirai no Bokura e.	Norimasa Fujisawa	1–13
The Prince of Tennis II	ED	Enjoy	Amikyuudanji	1–13

=== The Prince of Tennis II SPECIAL ===
OVA series Episodes 1–7: The Prince of Tennis II

#	Title	Original Release Date
1	"Night Before the Invitation"	April 20, 2012
The national championship tournament has ended, and the Middle Schoolers are enjoying free time. Some of the events that occur include Atobe going to school on a Sunday, Tezuka lure fishing with his grandfather Kunikazu, Oshitari Yushi and Kenya getting heated over a lottery in a shopping mall, and Shiraishi being told a shocking truth by his sister Yukari as he cares for his rhinoceros beetle. Over in America Ryouma fights with some American friends for control of a tennis court to use for fun.
2	"Child of God VS. Emperor"	June 22, 2012
The U-17 training camp has begun, and pairs are being forced to defeat their partners to remain at the camp. The episode focuses on the previously unshown duel between Rikkai partners Yukimura and Sanada. The match between the Fuji brothers is also shown.
3	"Carrying On the Legend"	August 24, 2012
The duels to remain in camp continue as Shirashi and Kenya are forced to face off. The history of how they became partners and friends as kids is also shown.
4	"What It Means to Be a Winner"	October 26, 2012
The winners are given a harsh training regiment and only 6 hours to finish it. After the regiment is completed they are able to enjoy the luxurious facilities and meals. Kikumaru and Otori are disheartened by their separation from their partners. As they commiserate with one another Atobe and Mizuki harshly state they can't afford to worry about the losers. Atobe and Mizuki both believe should they continue to do so, they will fall out of the camp themselves.
5	"Bonds Between Men"	December 21, 2012
After Shishido threw the match vs. Otori, Otori remains with the winners at the training camp and vows to become stronger. His turn finally comes to participate in the shuffle matches. Otori enthusiastically faces high schooler Enjoji, but when his Scud Serves prove useless he loses the match. Now Otori must figure out how to become stronger and keep his promise, but will his teammates have any suggestions that could help him?
6	"Angel and Bible"	February 22, 2013
Before joining the camp Akaya promised he wouldn't play against the high schoolers in Devil Mode. That promise is about to be in danger of being broken. Courts 3 and 5 face off. Oni's court 5 team of middle schoolers is overwhelmed by the surprising strength of the high school students and loses the first round. Doubles team Shiraishi and Akaya are tasked with playing the second round. However, their opponents Matsudaira and Miyako taunt Akaya in an attempt to provoke him and force him into devil mode. Should Akaya fall for the taunts, it will assure their loss, but if he can find a way to remain composed he will become stronger than ever.
7	"Prince of Secrets"	April 24, 2013
The losers return, bringing new energy to the training camp, when a new problem arises! Due to a bout of poor weather shipments of essential supplies have been unable to reach the camp. Unable to eat what they want, the stress builds on the middle schoolers. Their eyes fall upon a large bag brought into the camp by Horio. Under the guise of a pillow fight all the middle schoolers begin targeting Horio's bag, believing it will contain something they can use to boost their energy and continue in the dangerous camp.

Season	OP/ED	Song Title	Artist	Episode
The Prince of Tennis II OVA	OP	Mirai no Bokura e.	Norimasa Fujisawa	1–7
The Prince of Tennis II OVA	ED	Enjoy	Amikyuudanji	1–7

== The Prince of Tennis II OVA vs. Genius 10 ==
OVA series Episodes 1–10: ~1st stringers arc~

#	Title	Original Release Date
1	"Prelude to a Revolution"	October 28, 2014
The middle schoolers participate in a series of court 2 & 3 intersquad matches to determine which group is stronger. After, they divide up in their rooms and unite with old friends. Akaya tells his silent roommates stories about fallen soldiers. Fuji and his roommates excitedly discuss the potted plants they brought. The Golden Pair starts a pillow fight. Meanwhile, Sanada meets with Coach Mifune and is told to take advantage of something about to come. 20 players known as the First Stringers are returning from their month long tour and are about to take the camp's intensity to a new level.
2	"The Battle Begins"	October 28, 2014
After having been told about the first stringers by Sanada, some of the elite black coats begin matches with players 11–20 from the first string. Yanagi faces off against No. 17 Mitsuya. To Inui's surprise he calls Mitsuya "Akuto-niisan." Mitsuya is the man who taught Yanagi Data Tennis before, Though it's a battle between two powerful Data Tennis players, Inui senses something is off when he sees Mitsuya toying with Yanagi. Meanwhile, Momoshiro and Kenya battle No. 18 Hira and No. 19 Hara Shitenhoji OB doubles team and struggle against their opponents' unique rhythm. While these battles take place, the remaining court 1 members inform the court 3 middle school winners about the first string and announce that court numbers no longer matter.
3	"Reflection and Illusion"	December 25, 2014
The middle schoolers' battle against the first string's No. 11 through 20 continues with the lone court 3 player and the lone middle schooler chosen for enhancement participating. Yukimura's opponent is No. 11 Fuwa. However, before the first shot, Fuwa offers Yukimura a handicap and blindfolds himself. Fuwa demonstrates his skills, despite his lack of vision, but Yukimura shows no signs of giving up. He challenges Fuwa, saying he doesn't need a handicap, leading Fuwa to take off his blindfold. Yukimura is shocked when his power seems to backfire on him as Fuwa reveals his eyes reflect everything. Turns out, he was played by Yukimura as he was imagining everything. Meanwhile, Oishi and Niou play doubles against Mutsu Yūho and Mutsu Yūma and Irie plays against No. 20 Akiba. Akiba calls Irie's theatrical style "cheap acting." Angered by his words, Irie recalls his conversation with Atobe and remembers his previous match against Akiba.
4	"The Night Before the Battle"	December 25, 2014
Kintarou plays against Hakamada Izou and the rest of the middle schoolers meet back up on the main court with the rest, many having a representative pin. Kintarou then comes back carrying his defeated opponent who gives him his pin, but just as he does that, first string No. 1-10 show up bashing the losing reps. The middle schoolers and the reps decide on a shuffle match for the next day to become Japan's representatives. An unknown rep with his hood hiding his face tosses Ryoma an orange then disappears. No. 2, Tanegashima Shūji, teases Kaido and Sanada by stealing their drink when they jogged together. Meanwhile, Tokugawa takes Ryoma to the court for a practice where he reveals his past and how he wants to beat No. 1, Byōdōin Hōō after being badly beaten by him. Then, Byōdōin himself shows up and attacks Ryoma unguarded. Tokugawa leaps in front of the ball and takes it for Ryoma! Ryoma challenges him to a game but the unknown rep shows up and reveals himself as Echizen Ryoga, Ryoma's brother, who of course, Ryoma doesn't remember. Coach Mifune returns the middle schoolers their jerseys which they all put on in favour of the camp ones.
5	"The Strongest Pair"	February 20, 2015
The shuffle matches begin with Atobe and Niou (morphed into Tezuka) against No.10 Mōri Juzaburō and No.9 Ochi Tsukimitsu. Ochi and Mōri take the lead first but Niou hits the Zero Shiki and uses the Tezuka Zone and Atobe uses his new moves, both strings match up their service games. Unexpectedly, Atobe isn't able to serve over the net, bringing it into tiebreaker because of pressure from Ochi's glare. Niou saves the points with the Tezuka Phantom but this equals burden on his elbow. His determination and sacrifice motivates Atobe but at an incoming ball Kabaji jumps in and scores the point for Atobe. The first stringers let the point count allowing the second stringers the set. Kabaji is thrown out of the camp for violating the rules. Niou transforms into Ryoma, but he can no longer stand, costing them the second set. But Niou tricks them as he was observing the first stringers while lying on the court; Atobe and Niou Synchro! They take the final set and their rep pins.
6	"Betrayal and Negotiations"	February 20, 2015
The next match, singles of Ishida Gin against Duke Watanabe. Ishida loses as Duke bests all 108 levels of the Hadokyuu. Now, No. 8 Tōno Atsukyō and No. 7 Kimijima Ikuto, take on Kite and Marui in doubles. Kite turns on Marui, hitting him from behind previously getting a deal with the first stringers since he believes in siding with the strong. It's now 3 on 1! Marui loses the first set. It turns out Kimijima wanted to turn on Tōno and asked for Kite to help attack his weaknesses and with an offer for them to be double partners. But before that happens, Marui takes control of all the receives with Wonder Castle. Kite, moved, resides with Marui restating he sides with the strong.
7	"Embrace the 10 Ball Strike and Sleep"	April 24, 2015
Surprise! Kimijima also negotiated with Marui promising that if he help him turn on Tōno, he would help Yukimura heal his illness for good. Marui follows up on this deal and hits Tōno on the knee. Still, the first stringers takes the set: two on one. Kite remarks to Marui that he is done with doubles and asks for a piece of gum. It is now Oni vs. Kintarou since Akutsu, the original opponent has vanished. Oni increases the ball illusion to 10 balls but he manages to hit them all back, surprising everyone. He proclaimes that he will be the best player in Japan. Ryoma follows Ryoga and they bump into Akutsu who expresses his disinterest in playing for Japan but instead to pay back Ryoma. Ryoga laughs and Akutsu plays him with numerous balls which Ryoga easily avoids and hits back. Ryoma saves Akutsu from Ryoga's powerful ball. They are interrupted by Sanada who wants to play doubles with Akutsu. Oni's memories are shown on why he must win and his past with Byōdōin. Kintarou achieves the Pinnacle of Perfection after expressing his enjoyment of tennis but Oni counters by activating his own Pinnale of Perfection as well. Oni wins the match.
8	"The Emperor and the Monster"	April 24, 2015
It is now doubles of Akutsu and Sanada vs. No. 6 Ōmagari Ryūji and No. 2 Tanegashima Shūji. Meanwhile, Ryoma asks Ryoga to teach him that "glowing shot" and Ryoga gives him a two stringed racquet telling him to find the Super Sweet Spot. On the court, Ryūji takes them both on alone using two racquets. Sanada's techniques are being conquered and he accidentally hits Akutsu's cheek! To even it out, Akutsu kicks him in the stomach. The pair is now cooperating and Sanada introduces Black Aura. Tanegashima rejoins his partner and Sanada attempts to counter using Double Clutch. Sanada-Akutsu pair lose. Ryoma and Ryoga get ready for a "real" match
9	"Resolve"	June 26, 2015
Memories of Ryoma and Ryoga is shown and of how Ryoga left him without an explanation and why Ryoma does not remember he has a brother since he lost his memories during Nationals. It is Tokugawa vs. Byōdōin! Tokugawa and Byōdōin's match from before is shown of how Irie and Oni stopped him from seriously injuring Tokugawa and why they refused going with the first stringers out of camp. Tokugawa takes a lead with The Divine Path of Asura; wins the set but it's obvious that Byōdōin has the upper hand, breaking the opposite wall. Byōdōin wins the second set with Pirates of the World and Tokugawa is beaten brutally as the final set proceeds. Tokugawa introduces a new technique, Black Hole, which can shorten his career if used excessively. Meanwhile, Ryoma senses Tokugawa's struggle and abandons his and Ryoga's match to see him puke blood largely from taking Destruction last night to protect Ryoma since he couldn't abandon him. Tokugawa collapses and Ryoma's anger flares.
10	"The Guided Ones"	June 26, 2015
Tokugawa stops Ryoma and resumes the game. He's at a disadvantage and still tries to use Black Hole even when he falls unconscious. Ryoma, unable to watch anymore despite Atobe's warning, jumps in and hits back a Destruction for Tokugawa injuring Byōdōin. Ryoma is ordered to leave the camp for breaking the rules. Unconcerned, he packs up. Byōdōin hits the water tower, threatening him; Ryoma promises to beat him once they meet again. Ryoga leaves, telling Byōdōin that he no longer has a reason to be there and gives him his No. 4 pin. Ryoma bumps into Sakuno and they go to a game centre where afterwards Sakuno shows him that she had drawn numerous bad luck fortunes at the shrine but one good luck one. Ryoma thanks her and leaves. Byōdōin is grudgingly impressed by Tokugawa and gives him the No. 4 pin. Back home, Ryoga tells Ryoma about the U-17 World Cup where he could beat Byōdōin as reps of America together. Coach Mifune arrives at the camp and is revealed to be the head coach where he announces that at the world cup, the middle schoolers could rep Japan as well! Ryoma's name is called but he is now at the air terminal for the American team where he promises to win the cup...

Season	OP/ED	Song Title	Artist	Episode
The Prince of Tennis II OVA vs. Genius 10	OP	Prelude to a Revolution	Atobe Keigo	1–10
The Prince of Tennis II OVA vs. Genius 10	ED	Party Time	Cap to Bin (ep 1), Hyotei Eternity (ep 2), Stones (ep 3), Pull Tab to Can (ep 4); GIGS (ep 5), Rikkai Young Kan (ep 6), Amikyuu Danji (ep 7); Tachikiri Tai (ep 8), Aozu (ep 9), Tenipuri All Stars (ep 10)	1–10

== The Prince of Tennis II: Hyotei vs. Rikkai Game of Future ==
Atobe invites Rikkai to play against Hyotei in an exhibition match. For the third years, this will be their last chance to play with their underclassmen before they graduate.

#	Title	Original Release Date
1	"Hyotei vs. Rikkai Game of Future Part 1"	February 13, 2021
2	"Hyotei vs. Rikkai Game of Future Part 2"	April 17, 2021

== The Prince of Tennis U-17 World Cup ==
#	Title	Original Release Date
1	"Team USA, Ryoma Echizen"	July 7, 2022
After Ryoma is forced to withdraw from the Japan U-17 training camp, Ryoga invites him to play for the US team.
2	"Pre-World Cup Kicks Off!"	July 14, 2022
Teams from all over the world competing in the U-17 World Cup gather to start things off with the Pre-World Cup exhibition matches.
3	"A Moment Ahead in the Future"	July 21, 2022
With one win each, Japan and Germany continue to face off in the third match of the Pre-World Cup exhibition.
4	"Prince vs. Prince"	July 28, 2022
A mysterious man riding a horse suddenly challenges Ryoma to a tennis match on horseback!
5	"Upset"	August 4, 2022
The World Cup Group League commences and Japan battles it out with Greece and Australia.
6	"Absolute Away Game"	August 11, 2022
Team Japan's #2 doubles players, Yukimura and Sanada, face a daunting match as the crowd is overwhelmingly filled with supporters for Australia, the home team.
7	"Chess King"	August 18, 2022
Japan continues their match against Australia with #1 doubles. Atobe and Fuji take on a super offensive doubles pair with big serves.
8	"One's Resolve, One's Condition"	August 25, 2022
Having lost both doubles matches against Switzerland, Japan begins its decisive #3 singles between Akutsu and Switzerland's Amadeus.
9	"Feelings for My Friends"	September 1, 2022
Ryoma needs to decide if Team USA is where he truly belongs. Meanwhile, the teams gear up for the Finals Tournament that starts in two days.
10	"Beyond the Bible"	September 8, 2022
The U-17 World Cup semi-final matches continue with France versus Japan. Can Kimijima and Shiraishi beat the aesthetically-inclined Tristan and Timothee of France in both tennis and charm?
11	"The Worst Doubles Pair"	September 15, 2022
Team Japan's Yanagi and Mori are partners for #1 doubles against France, but they obviously don't get along at all. Can they smooth things out between them before it's too late?
12	"Prince of Ace"	September 22, 2022
Ryoma's match with Chardard continues in #3 singles of Japan versus France. Whichever team is victorious will advance to play Germany.
13	"Samurai VS Knight"	September 29, 2022
Ryoma's match with Chardard continues in #3 singles of Japan versus France. Whichever team is victorious will advance to play Germany.

== The Prince of Tennis II U-17 World Cup Semifinal ==
#	Title	Original Release Date
1	"The Mightiest Germany: The Night Before the Match!"	October 3, 2024
The Japanese team is resolutely preparing for the match against Germany, aiming to advance to the finals afterward. Captain Byodoin trusts his players, who do not give up despite this challenge.
2	"Bluebird"	October 10, 2024
In the first match of the U-17 World Cup Semifinals it's Team Japan's Oni versus Team Germany's Q･P. Can Oni hold his ground against Team Germany's No. 2 player?
3	"For Whom Do You Grow Strong"	October 17, 2024
The first match of the World Cup Semifinals continues between Oni and Q･P. Oni shines with a mysterious light that resembles the Pinnacle of Perfection and becomes seemingly invincible.
4	"The Final Illusion"	October 24, 2024
In the next match, Team Japan's Duke and Nio face off against Schneider and Belti, two of the three tennis pros on Team Germany.
5	"Tezuka vs. Yukimura"	October 28, 2024
Continuing the World Cup Semifinals is Team Germany's Tezuka versus Team Japan's Yukimura in #2 singles. Tezuka is now their opponent, so Team Japan goes all out to gain victory against their former teammate.
6	"Zero Senses Tennis"	November 5, 2024
Yukimura prepares to counter Tezuka's Pinnacle of Perfection in order to prove to Akaya, his team, and himself that you don't have to give up on tennis even if you can't use the Pinnacle of Perfection.
7	"The Future Beyond the Fierce Match"	November 12, 2024
Every time Yukimura takes away Tezuka's five senses, Tezuka regaains them using the Pinnacle of Perfection. Can Yukimura be able to turn the tables or will Tezuka hold on to his lead?
8	"Team Spain, Ryoga Echizen"	November 19, 2024
In the other semifinals bracket, Team USA is competing with Team Spain for a spot at the finals. Ryoga Echizen, who is now playing for Team Spain, clashes with Ralph Reinhart of Team USA.
9	"Focus Burst vs. Pinnacle of Perfection"	November 26, 2024
Kirihara is determined to beat Siegfried's Pinnacle of Perfection with his Focus Burst. The two battle it out as their doubles partners watch on.
10	"The Outcome of the Tiebreak"	December 4, 2024
The second set of the doubles match between Tanegashima-Kirihara and Bismarck-Siegfried gets drawn into a tiebreak. If Team Japan loses this set, they will be eliminated from the semifinals.
11	"Final Set"	December 11, 2024
The doubles pairs Tanegashima-Kirihara and Bismarck-Siegfried ramp it up for this final set, showing teamwork that activates skills never seen before.
12	"Spiral Baptism"	December 18, 2024
In the last match of the semifinals, Byodoin and Volk go head-to-head in a mighty battle to bring their teams through to the finals.
13	"Life-Or-Death Tennis"	December 25, 2024
Byodoin puts his life on the line against Germany's Volk in an intense epilogue to the World Cup semifinals.
