= Fureai (band) =

Japanese musical duo

ふれあい
- Origin: Japan
- Years active: 1999–2003
- Labels: Cafe au Label, DNA CAPSULES, Pony Canyon, King Records
- Members: Osamu Ookubo (大久保 理); Junichirou Kawano (川野淳一郎)

Fureai (ふれあい) was a Japanese music duo active from 1999 to 2003. The duo consisted of childhood friends, forming the group in their 3rd year of high school. Their first mini-album and single were released on indies labels, Cafe au Label and DNA CAPSULES. Their second single with Pony Canyon became their major debut and a nationwide hit. Their last single, with King Records, was used an ending theme for the anime The Prince of Tennis.

== Singles ==
1. (2000.07.27) "胸の音" (Heartbeat)
2. (2000.11.22) "赤いリンゴ" (Red Apple)
3. (2001.02.07) "冬の空" (Winter Sky)
4. (2001.08.10) "過ぎていく" (Move On)
5. (2001.12.05) "約束" (Promise)
6. (2002.05.15) "風が強く吹いて" (Wind is Raging)
7. (2003.05.21) "風の旅人" (Wind Traveler)

== Albums ==
1. (1999.09.21) "情熱の行方" (Location of Passion)
2. (2001.03.07) "不思議な人" (Intriguing Person)
3. (2002.07.17) "雨上がり" (After the Rain)
