= List of The Prince of Tennis chapters =

The cover of the first manga volume released by Shueisha on January 7, 2000, in Japan

The chapters of The Prince of Tennis manga series are written and illustrated by Takeshi Konomi, and were serialized in Japan's manga magazine Weekly Shōnen Jump from July 1999 to March 2008. A sequel to the series entitled The Prince of Tennis II began serialization in Japan in the monthly magazine Jump Square on March 4, 2009. The story centers around a cocky tennis prodigy named Ryoma Echizen, who, upon his father's urging, enrolls in a private middle school called Seishun Academy ("Seigaku" for short), which, besides being famous for its strong tennis team, is his father's alma mater. The storyline of the first manga series revolves around Seigaku striving to become the National middle school tennis champions, while the sequel takes place several months after their National victory.

The Prince of Tennis manga spans a total of 379 chapters (380 if chapter "0" is included), which have been collected into 42 tankōbon volumes. Shueisha distributed these volumes in Japan, with the first volume being released on January 7, 2000, and the last on June 4, 2008. Each of the chapters are referred to as a "Genius", with the exception of chapters 245 to 247 which are primarily referred to as the "Wild" chapters since they are told from a different character's point of view. The sequel's chapters are each referred to as a "Golden Age". Three official fan books were also released by Shueisha, as well as one illustration book. Kenichi Sakura created a short tribute manga entitled The Prince of Afterschool, which began serialization in Jump Square in November 2008.

The series has been adapted into several forms of other media including a 178 episode anime series directed by Takayuki Hamana that aired from October 2001 to March 2005, and a series of subsequent OVAs released onto several DVDs. The anime, combined with the OVAs, roughly covers the storyline of the first manga series. It also spawned an ongoing series of musicals, as well as two featured films: one original animated film and the other being a live-action which loosely follows the events of the first eighteen volumes.

Viz Media licensed the series and distributes an English version of the manga in North America under the Shonen Jump imprint. The first English language volume was released on May 19, 2004, and the last one was released on July 5, 2011. The English anime adaptation debuted in North America as streaming media on Toonami Jetstream on July 14, 2006.

== Volume list ==
=== The Prince of Tennis ===
==== Volumes 1 – 21 ====
No.	Title	Original release date	North American release date
1	Ryoma Echizen; Echizen Ryōma (越前 リョーマ)	January 7, 2000; 4-08-872815-7	May 19, 2004; 978-1-59116-435-7
Genius 001. "Ryoma Echizen" (越前 リョーマ, "Echizen Ryōma"); Genius 002. "A Suspicious Child Has Appeared" (クセモノ アラワル, "Kusemono Arawaru"); Genius 003. "2nd Year vs 1st Year" (2年 対 1年!, "2 nen tai 1 nen!"); Genius 004. "A Declaration of War" (宣戦布告!, "Sensen fukoku!"); Genius 005. "The Dusty Racket" (埃まみれのラケット, "Hokori mamire no Raketto"); Genius 006. "Irony" (波紋, "Hamon"); Genius 007. "The Start Of The Ranking Tournament" (ランキング戦開始!, "Rankingu sen kaishi!")
Ryoma Echizen just joined the Seishun Gakuen Middle School tennis team, which is known for being one of the most competitive teams in Japan. Ryoma has proven his skills by winning four straight American junior tournament titles. With his skills, Ryoma challenges a rule of Seishun Gakuen that freshmen don't represent the team to play in tournaments until summer.
2	Adder's Fangs; Mamushi no kiba (マムシの牙)	April 4, 2000; 4-08-872851-3	July 14, 2004; 978-1-59116-436-4
Genius 008. "Snake Fangs" (マムシの牙, "Mamushi no kiba"); Genius 009. "Trap" (罠, "Wana"); Genius 010. "A Contest of Wills" (マインド ゲーム, "Maindo Gēmu"); Genius 011. "Want to Defeat a Guy" (やっつけたい奴, "Yattsuke tai yatsu"); Genius 012. "Still Two Balls Lefts" (届かない, "Todoka nai"); Genius 013. "Pride of a Third Year" (3年の貫禄!, "3 nen no kanroku!"); Genius 014. "There's Still More to See" (まだまだ, "Madamada"); Genius 015. "The Weight of Half a Step" (スピリットステップ ~半歩の重み~, "Supiritto Suteppu ~han ho no omomi~"); Genius 016. "The Cocky Rookie" (生意気な新入生, "Namaiki na Rūkī")
Ryoma Echizen just joined the Seishun Gakuen Middle School tennis team, which is known for being one of the most competitive teams in Japan. Its members are incredibly talented, gifted, and athletic. With rigorous and extremely intense practices, the upperclassmen of the team expect the very best from themselves and they expect even more from the new members of the team. While most of the first years are on pins and needles hoping they won't get cut from the team, Ryoma Echizen is confident, cool, and collected. Some might even say he's cocky, but at least he's got the skills to back up his attitude. With his virtually unreturnable "twist serve", Ryoma is sure to make the starting team.
3	Street Tennis; Sutorīto Tenisu (ストリート テニス)	July 2, 2000; 4-08-872876-9	September 7, 2004; 978-1-59116-437-1
Genius 017. "Have Mercy" (お手やわらかに, "Ote yawaraka ni"); Genius 018. "Guys with Great Determination" (負けず嫌いな奴ら, "Makezugirai na yatsura"); Genius 019. "Akaya Kirihara" (切原赤也!!, "Kirihara Akaya"); Genius 020. "Street Tennis" (ストリート テニス, "Sutorīto Tenisu"); Genius 021. "District Competition Starts" (地区予選開始!, "Chiku yosen kaishi!"); Genius 022. "Getting Revenge" (カリを返せ!!, "Kari o kaese!!"); Genius 023. "Loss on First Match?" (緒戦敗退!?, "Shosen haitai!?"); Genius 024. "Double Team" (ダブルス, "Daburusu"); Genius 025. "Advancing to District Finals" (進む地区予選!, "Susumu chiku yosen!")
The Nationals are coming and Seishun Academy has started training harder than ever! During practice, Rikkai Junior High School's 8th-grader ace Akaya Kirihara spies on Seishun Academy's team. Luckily, he is caught and escorted off the courts. But on the way out, he bumps into none other than Ryoma Echizen, the Prince of Tennis. Tension soars as these two ace players size each other up knowing that someday they will engage in battle to see who is the stronger player. Soon after, Ryoma and Momo get drawn into a doubles match - street tennis style! Can these two star players ever learn how to use their legendary skills to play good doubles?
4	The Black Unit; Kuroi gundan Fudōmine (黒い軍団不動峰)	August 4, 2000; 4-08-872896-3	November 11, 2004; 978-1-59116-438-8
Genius 026. "The Black Unit-Fudomine" (黒い軍団不動峰, "Kuroi gundan Fudōmine"); Genius 027. "Seishun vs. Fudomine" (青学VS不動峰, "Seigaku VS Fudōmine"); Genius 028. "Genius vs. Power" (天才VS波動球, "Tensai VS hadō dama"); Genius 029. "Everyone's Opponent" (それぞれの対戦相手, "Sorezore no taisen aite"); Genius 030. "Ace of Speed" (スピードのエース, "Supīdo no Ēsu"); Genius 031. "Watch Out for the Snake!" (スネイクを凌駕しろ!, "Suneiku o Ryōga Shiro"); Genius 032. "What the Phantom Snake Brought..." (幻のブーメランスネイクがもたらしたもの..., "Maboroshi no Būmeran Suneiku ga motarashi ta mono..."); Genius 033. "Small Fist Pump" (小さなガッツポーズ, "Chiisana Gattsu Pōzu"); Genius 034. "Ryoma's Single Debut" (越前リョーマ 公式戦シングルスデビュー, "Echizen Ryōma kōshiki-sen Shingurusu Debyū")
The quest continues for the gritty players at Seishun Academy. With their sights dead-set on making it all the way to the Nationals, they must outclass every team that stands in their way. Next up is Fudomine, a group of belligerent players who were disqualified from the rookie games last year due to a tournament fracas. Tempers flare and talents soar when the battle begins with the very first serve. It might take more than "Tsubame Gaeshi" to secure this victory!
5	New Challenge; Arata naru shiren (新たなる試練)	October 4, 2000; 4-08-873024-0	January 4, 2005; 978-1-59116-439-5
Genius 035. "Shock the World" (ド肝を抜け!, "Do kimo o nuke!"); Genius 036. "Mutter, Mutter" (ぼやき, "Boyaki"); Genius 037. "Spot" (スポット, "Supotto"); Genius 038. "The Decision" (決断, "Ketsudan"); Genius 039. "Ten-Minute Limit" (10分のタイムリミット, "10 bunno Taimurimitto"); Genius 040. "Champion" (王者, "Ōja"); Genius 041. "Go, Sushi, Go" (寿司屋でGO!, "Sushi ya de GO!"); Genius 042. "New Challenge" (新たなる試練, "Arata naru shiren"); Special Short Story. "The Prince of Tennis" (テニスの王子様, "Tenisu no ōjisama")
With only one victory away from advancing to the city tournament, Seishun Academy fields the Prince of Tennis, Ryoma Echizen, to compete against the mysterious and mumbling Shinji of the Fudomine Team. As the punishing battle of skills unfolds, Ryoma develops a muscle paralysis called "Spot," which leaves him with barely enough strength to grip the racket, much less swing it. Refusing to go down without a fight, Ryoma unleashes a "two-sword fighting style" technique that only talented, ambidextrous players are able to execute. Will Ryoma have the strength to pull himself out of the ditch and beat Shinji? And what awaits his ex-pro tennis player father, Nanjiro, when a reporter tracks him down?
6	Sign of Strength; Tsuyo sa he no mebae (強さへの芽生え)	December 4, 2000; 4-08-873049-6	March 1, 2005; 978-1-59116-440-1
Genius 043. "Sign of Strength" (強さへの芽生え, "Tsuyo sa he no mebae"); Genius 044. "Game Faces (Two Weeks Before the Tournament)" (都大会2週間前 ~動き始めた各校の面々~, "To taikai 2 shūkan mae ~ugoki hajime ta kakukō no menmen~"); Genius 045. "What's Going On?" (どうなっちゃってんの, "Dō nacchatten no"); Genius 046. "Half Court vs. Full Court - 5 Rally Match (Part 1)" (白熱! 半面VS全面の5ラリー対決(1), "Hakunetsu! Hanmen VS zenmen no 5 Rarī taiketsu (1)"); Genius 047. "Half Court vs. Fully Court - 5 Rally Match (Part 2)" (白熱! 半面VS全面の5ラリー対決(2), "Hakunetsu! Hanmen VS zenmen no 5 Rarī taiketsu (2)"); Genius 048. "The Day Before the Tournament (Kalpin's Big Adventure)" (都大会前日 ~カルピンの大冒険~, "To taikai zenjitsu ~Karupin no dai bōken~"); Genius 049. "Opening"; Genius 050. "These Guys Are Too Good" (強すぎる奴ら, "Tsuyo sugiru yatsura"); Genius 051. "Contact Under Water" (水面下の接触, "Suimen ka no sesshoku")
7	St. Rudolph's Best; Kiyoshi Rudorufu gakuin no jitsuryoku (聖ルドルフ学院の実力)	February 2, 2001; 4-08-873076-3	May 3, 2005; 978-1-59116-787-7
Genius 052. "Best 8 Assembled" (ベスト8出揃う!, "Besuto 8 desorō!"); Genius 053. "Dark Clouds" (暗雲, "Anun"); Genius 054. "Momo & Kaidoh" (桃と海堂, "Momo to Kaidō"); Genius 055. "St. Rudolph's Best" (聖ルドルフ学院の実力, "Kiyoshi Rudorufu gakuin no jitsuryoku"); Genius 056. "Akazawa Magic" (赤澤マジック, "Akazawa majikku"); Genius 057. "Oishi & Kikumaru" (大石と菊丸, "Ōishi to Kikumaru"); Genius 058. "Battle!" (激戦, "Gekisen"); Genius 059. "Ambush!" (思わぬ伏兵, "Omowa nu fukuhei"); Genius 060. "Perfect Scenario" (完璧なシナリオ, "Kanpeki na Shinario"); "Prince of Tennis: Special Version"
8	Change the Script!! Shinario o buchi kowase!! (シナリオをブチ壊せ！！)	May 1, 2001; 4-08-873112-3	July 5, 2005; 978-1-59116-853-9
Genius 061. "Trump Card" (切り札, "Kirifuda"); Genius 062. "Deep Power" (底力, "Sokojikara"); Genius 063. "Tiebreaker" (タイブレーク, "Taiburēku"); Genius 064. "In and Out" (コートの内と外, "Kōto no uchi to soto"); Genius 065. "Miscalculation" (誤算, "Gosan"); Genius 066. "Smashing Out" (炸裂ダンクスマッシュ, "Sakuretsu Danku Sumasshu"); Genius 067. "Change the Script!!" (シナリオをブチ壊せ！！, "Shinario o buchi kowase!!"); Genius 068. "1-1"; Genius 069. "Left On Left" (左利きVS左利き, "Hidarikiki VS hidarikiki")
9	Take Aim! Hyōteki o misuero! (標的を見据えろ！)	July 4, 2001; 4-08-873139-5	September 6, 2005; 1-59116-995-X
Genius 070. "Hit the Target!" (標的を見据えろ！, "Hyōteki o misuero!"); Genius 071. "Yuta's Retort" (弟の答え, "Yuta no kotae"); Genius 072. "Bag of Tricks" (本領発揮, "Honryō hakki"); Genius 073. "Drive B" (ドライブB, "Doraibu B"); Genius 074. "No Fooling" (本気, "Honki"); Genius 075. "Hajime vs. Shusuke" (観月VS不二, "Hajime VS Shusuke"); Genius 076. "Easy or Difficult?"; Genius 077. "Top Seed and Dark Horse" (第1シードの氷帝学園??ダークホースの不動峰, "Dai 1 Shīdo no kōri Mikado Gakuen?? Dākuhōsu no Fudōmine"); Genius 078. "Renewed Resolve" (新たなる決意, "Arata Naru Ketsui"); "The Prince of Tennis Exposé"
10	Seize the Moment! Sono shunkan o minogasu na!! (その瞬間を見逃すな！！)	September 4, 2001; 4-08-873162-X	November 8, 2005; 978-1-4215-0070-6
Genius 079. "Sweet Tooth" (まんじゅう食って, "Manjū kutte"); Genius 080. "Target" (ターゲット, "Tāgetto"); Genius 081. "Self-Introduction (Part 1)" (自己紹介, "Jiko shōkai"); Genius 082. "Self-Introduction (Part 2)" (自己紹介2, "Jiko shōkai 2"); Genius 083. "For Tomorrow...?!!" (明日のために...！！, "Ashita no tame ni...!!"); Genius 084. "Play for Keeps" (真剣勝負, "Shinken shōbu"); Genius 085. "Seize the Moment!" (その瞬間を見逃すな！！, "Sono shunkan o minogasu na!!"); Genius 086. "Challenge" (挑戦状, "Chōsen jō"); Genius 087. "Stubborn" (こだわり, "Kodawari")
Note: The English version produced by Viz Media censors Jin Akutsu's underage smoking, altering the cigarette to a toothpick.
11	Premonition of a Storm; Arashi no yokan (嵐の予感)	November 4, 2001; 4-08-873201-4	January 3, 2006; 978-1-4215-0201-4
Genius 088. "Seishun's No. 1 Fox" (青学一の曲者, "Seishun ichi no kusemono"); Genius 089. "Three Monsters" (3人のバケモノ, "3-ri no bakemono"); Genius 090. "First Semifinal Match (Fudomine vs. Yamabuki)" (～準決勝第1試合～ 不動峰VS山吹, "~Junkesshō dai 1 shiai~ Fudōmine VS Yamabuki"); Genius 091. "Premonition of a Storm" (嵐の予感, "Arashi no yokan"); Genius 092. "National Level" (全国クラス, "Zenkoku Kurasu"); Genius 093. "The Minami and Higashigata Pair" (南・東方ペア, "Minami tōhō Pea"); Genius 094. "Plain and Simple" (地味'S, "Jimi'S"); Genius 095. "A Lucky Beggar"; Genius 096. "No. 3 Singles" (シングルス3, "Shingurusu 3")
12	Invincible Man; Muteki no otoko (無敵の男)	February 4, 2002; 4-08-873223-5	March 7, 2006; 978-1-4215-0337-0
Genius 097. "Trickster" (くわせ者, "Kuwase-sha"); Genius 098. "Determination" (決意, "Ketsui"); Genius 099. "Jack Knife" (ジャックナイフ, "Jakku Naifu"); Genius 100. "Drive A" (ドライブA, "Doraibu A"); Genius 101. "Jin Akutsu--Prodigy" (怪童 亜久津 仁, "Kaidō a hisatsu hitoshi"); Genius 102. "Once in a Decade Phenom" (10年に1人の逸材, "10-nen ni 1-ri no itsuzai"); Genius 103. "Invincible Man" (無敵の男, "Muteki no otoko"); Genius 104. "Steppingstone" (踏み台, "Fumidai"); Genius 105. "Natural" (天衣無縫へ, "Tenimuhō he")
13	Akutsu's Pride/Ryoma's Courage; Akutsu no iji Ryōma no yūki (亜久津の意地 リョーマの勇気)	April 4, 2002; 4-08-873247-2	May 2, 2006; 978-1-4215-0666-1
Genius 106. "Unbecoming" (格好悪い事, "Kakkō warui koto"); Genius 107. "Akutsu's Pride/Ryoma's Courage" (亜久津の意地 リョーマの勇気, "Akutsu no iji Ryōma no yūki"); Genius 108. "Beyond Victory" (勝利の向こうに, "Shōri no mukō ni"); Genius 109. "Possibility" (可能性, "Kanōsei"); Genius 110. "Mixed Ranking Match" (異種格闘戦, "Ishu kakutō-sen"); Genius 111. "Intra-Squad Ranking Matches" (校内ランキング戦, "Kōnai Rankingu-sen"); Genius 112. "Block A" (Aブロック, "A Burokku"); Genius 113. "Data Does Not Lie" (データは嘘をつかない, "Dēta ha uso o tsuka nai"); Genius 114. "Superior Data Tennis" (至高のデータテニス, "Shikō no Dēta Tenisu")
14	The Strongest Man in Seigaku; Seigaku saikyō no otoko (青学最強の男)	July 4, 2002; 4-08-873283-9	July 5, 2006; 1-4215-0667-X
Genius 115. "The Strongest Man in Seigaku" (青学最強の男, "Seigaku saikyō no otoko"); Genius 116. "Dark Clouds" (暗雲, "Anun"); Genius 117. "A Challenging Spirit" (挑む心, "Idomu kokoro"); Genius 118. "Birth of the New Seigaku's Strongest Army" (新青学最強軍団誕生, "Shin shingaku saikyō gundan tanjō"); Genius 119. "Gathering of Rivals" (ライバル集結！, "Raibaru shūketsu!"); Genius 120. "A New Combination!?" (新コンビ誕生！？, "Shin Konbi tanjō!?"); Genius 121. "Ryo Once Again" (宍戸再び, "Shishido futatabi"); Genius 122. "Hyotei vs Seigaku" (激突！氷帝VS青学, "Gekitotsu! Hyotei VS Seigaku"); Genius 123. "Where is Ryoma?" (リョーマはどこ...！？, "Ryōma ha doko...!?")
15	Inui/Kaidoh Pair; Inui Kaidō Pea (乾・海堂ペア)	September 4, 2002; 4-08-873312-6	September 5, 2006; 978-1-4215-0668-5
Genius 124. "Acrobatic Tennis Showdown" (アクロバティック対決, "Akurobatikku taiketsu"); Genius 125. "As a Senpai" (先輩として..., "Senpai toshite..."); Genius 126. "Three Person Doubles" (3人でダブルス, "3-ri de Daburusu"); Genius 127. "Who's the Amateur?" (ツメの甘いのはどっちだ！？, "Tsume no amai no ha docchi da!?"); Genius 128. "Inui/Kaidoh Pair" (乾・海堂ペア, "Inui Kaidō Pea"); Genius 129. "Endurance vs. Endurance" (精神力×精神力, "Seishin ryoku kakeru seishin ryoku"); Genius 130. "Reaction Time" (反応時間, "Hannō jikan"); Genius 131. "Trust" (信頼, "Shinrai")
16	Super Combo; Sūpā Konbi (スーパーコンビ)	November 4, 2002; 4-08-873351-7	November 7, 2006; 978-1-4215-0669-2
Genius 132. "Super Combo" (スーパーコンビ, "Sūpā Konbi"); Genius 133. "Clumsy" (不器用, "Bukiyō"); Genius 134. "Last Tennis" (最後のテニス..., "Saigo no Tenisu..."); Genius 135. "Power Game" (パワー勝負, "Pawā shōbu"); Genius 136. "Taka's Hadokyu" (河村の波動球, "Kawamura no Hadokyu"); Genius 137. "Victory Is Certain!" (絶対に勝つ！, "Zettai ni katsu!"); Genius 138. "Hadokyu vs. Hadokyu" (波動球VS波動球, "Hadokyu VS Hadokyu"); Genius 139. "Shusuke Fuji" (不二周助, "Fuji Shusuke"); Genius 140. "Jiro Wakes Up" (ジロー起きる, "Jirō okiru")
17	Waltzing Toward Destruction; Hametsu e no Rondo (破滅への輪舞曲)	February 4, 2003; 4-08-873380-0	January 2, 2007; 1-4215-0670-X
Genius 141. "Jiro Akutagawa" (芥川慈郎, "Akutagawa Jiro"); Genius 142. "White Whale" (白鯨, "Shiro kujira"); Genius 143. "Guys on the Move" (動きだした奴等, "Ugokidashi ta yatsura"); Genius 144. "Battle of the Best" (頂上対決, "Chōjō taiketsu"); Genius 145. "Insight Into Weakness" (弱点を見抜く眼力, "Jakuten o minuku ganriki"); Genius 146. "Truth Revealed!" (事実発覚！, "Jijitsu hakkaku!"); Genius 147. "Captain Yamato" (大和部長, "Yamato buchō"); Genius 148. "Waltzing Toward Destruction" (破滅への輪舞曲, "Hametsu e no Rondo"); Genius 149. "Endurance" (持久戦, "Jikyū-sen")
18	Ace in the Hole; Totte oki no kirifuda (とっておきの切り札)	April 4, 2003; 4-08-873407-6	March 6, 2007; 978-1-4215-1094-1
Genius 150. "Closest Thing to Glory" (掴みかけた栄光, "Tsukami kake ta eikō"); Genius 151. "Cheer" (応援, "Ōen"); Genius 152. "Unpredictable" (読み切れなかった男, "Yomikire nakatta otoko"); Genius 153. "Illusion" (まぼろし, "Ma boroshi"); Genius 154. "Ace in the Hole" (とっておきの切り札, "Totte oki no kirifuda"); Genius 155. "Love Overthrow" (下克上大好き, "Gekokujō daisuki"); Genius 156. "Optimum Pace" ("High Tension"); Genius 157. "Passed the First Round" (1回戦突破！！, "1-kaisen toppa!!"); Genius 158. "Bowling, Go!" (ボウリングでGO！, "Bōringu de GO!")
19	Goodbye Tennis	July 4, 2003; 4-08-873482-3	May 1, 2007; 978-1-4215-1095-8
Genius 159. "The Prince Of Bowling" (ボウリングの王子様, "Bōringu no ōji-sama"); Genius 160. "Tezuka's Journey" (手塚の旅立ち, "Teduka no tabidachi"); Genius 161. "The New Oishi Regime" (大石新体制, "Ōishi shin taisei"); Genius 162. "The Skill Of Saitama's Midoriyama Jr. High" (埼玉緑山中の実力, "Saitama Midori sanchū no jitsuryoku"); Genius 163. "Endurance" (粘り, "Nebari"); Genius 164. "To Each Their Own Battle" (それぞれの戦い, "Sorezore no tatakai"); Genius 165. "Kids" (ガキなんて, "Gaki nante"); Genius 166. "Follow The Rhythm" (リズムに乗りまくれ♪, "Rizumu ni nori makure♪"); Genius 167. "Sengoku VS Kamio" (千石VS神尾, "Sengoku VS Kamio")
20	Their Own Style Of Tennis; Jibun tachi no Tenisu (自分達のテニス)	September 4, 2003; 4-08-873505-6	July 3, 2007; 978-1-4215-1096-5
Genius 168. "The Man With The Long Racket" (長いラケットの男, "Nagai Raketto no otoko"); Genius 169. "Seigaku VS Rokkaku" (青学VS六角, "Seigaku VS Rokkaku"); Genius 170. "Their Own Style Of Tennis" (自分達のテニス, "Jibun tachi no Tenisu"); Genius 171. "Showdown" (真っ向勝負！, "Makkō shōbu!"); Genius 172. "Beware Of 'THAT'!" (アレに気を付けろ！, "Are ni ki o tsukero!"); Genius 173. "The New Style Of Hadoukyuu" (新型波動球, "Shingata Hadōkyū"); Genius 174. "Initiative" (主導権, "Shudō-ken"); Genius 175. "Local Skirmish" (局地戦, "Kyokuchi-sen"); Genius 176. "He Returned It..." (返してきた..., "Kaeshi te kita...")
21	Kikumaru's New Step; Kikumaru shirushi no shin Suteppu (菊丸印の新ステップ)	December 4, 2003; 4-08-873534-X	September 4, 2007; 978-1-4215-1097-2
Genius 177. "Adversity" (窮地, "Kyūchi"); Genius 178. "Kikumaru's New Step" (菊丸印の新ステップ, "Kikumaru shirushi no shin Suteppu"); Genius 179. "Moment of Confusion" (決着の瞬間, "Ketchaku no shunkan"); Genius 180. "Pressure" (プレッシャー, "Puresshā"); Genius 181. "Aoi Kentarou" (葵 剣太郎, "Aoi Kentarō"); Genius 182. "First Contact" (ファーストコンタクト, "Fāsuto Kontakuto"); Genius 183. "Kaidoh Kaoru's Tennis" (海堂 薫のテニス, "Kaidō Kaoru no Tenisu"); Genius 184. "Remains of a Scar" (爪痕を残して, "Tsumeato o nokoshi te"); Genius 185. "vs. Rikkai Mode" (対立海モード, "Tairitsu umi Mōdo")

==== Volumes 22 – 42 ====
No.	Title	Original release date	North American release date
22	Surprise Attack; Kishū (奇襲)	February 4, 2004; 4-08-873561-7	November 6, 2007; 1-4215-1098-7
Genius 186. "Surprise Attack" (奇襲, "Kishū"); Genius 187. "2 Minutes 11 Seconds" (2分11秒, "2-bu 11-byō"); Genius 188. "Sign of Dangerous Mode" (危険モードのサイン, "Kiken Mōdo no sain"); Genius 189. "Terrifying Knuckle Serve" (戦慄のナックルサーブ, "Senritsu no Nakkuru Sābu"); Genius 190. "Merciless Attacks" (容赦なき攻撃, "Yōsha naki kōgeki"); Genius 191. "Ryoma Awakens" (リョーマ覚醒, "Ryōma kakusei"); Genius 192. "Proof of Awakening" (覚醒の証, "Kakusei no akashi"); Genius 000. "Legend of the Samurai" (立海大付属の掟, "Samurai no uta")
23	Kantou Tournament Finals; Kantō taikai kesshō (関東大会決勝)	April 2, 2004; 4-08-873585-4	January 1, 2008; 978-1-4215-1473-4
Genius 193. "The Law of Rikkai Dai Fuzoku" (立海大付属の掟, "Rikkaidai fuzoku no okite"); Genius 194. "The Terror of Red Eyes" (赤目の恐怖..., "Akame no kyōfu"); Genius 195. "Kantou Tournament Finals" (関東大会決勝, "Kantō taikai kesshō"); Genius 196. "Preemptive Punch!" (先制パンチ！, "Sensei Panchi!"); Genius 197. "Despair" (絶望, "Zetsubō"); Genius 198. "As Rivals" (ライバルとして, "Raibaru to shite"); Genius 199. "This is Our Answer!!" (それが答えだ！！, "Sore ga kotaeda!"); Genius 200. "Pride" (プライド, "Puraido"); Genius 201. "Pride 2" (プライド2, "Puraido 2")
24	Checkmate; Ōte (王手)	July 2, 2004; 4-08-873628-1	March 4, 2008; 978-1-4215-1646-2
Genius 202. "Golden Pair Revived!!" (ゴールデンペア復活！！, "Gōruden Pea fukkatsu!!"); Genius 203. "Kikumaru's Vow" (菊丸の誓い, "Kikumaru no chikai"); Genius 204. "No-Sign Combination Play" (ノーサインコンビプレイ, "Nō sain Konbi Purei"); Genius 205. "The Gentleman and the Trickster" (紳士と詐欺師, "Jentoruman to peten"); Genius 206. "Two Lasers" (2つのレーザー, "2-tsu no Rēzā"); Genius 207. "Oishi Territory" (大石の領域, "Ōishi no Teritorī"); Genius 208. "Checkmate" (王手, "Ōte"); Genius 209. "Yanagi Renji vs Inui Sadaharu" (柳蓮二VS乾貞治, "Yanagi Renji VS Inui Sadaharu"); Genius 210. "4 Years 2 Months and 15 Days" (4年と2カ月と15日, "4-nen to 2-kagetsu to 15-nichi")
25	Memories; Omoi (思い)	September 3, 2004; 4-08-873646-X	May 6, 2008; 978-1-4215-1647-9
Genius 211. "Collapse of Data Tennis" (データテニス崩壊, "Dēta Tenisu hōkai"); Genius 212. "Probability of Victory" (勝率..., "Shōritsu..."); Genius 213. "Memories" (思い, "Omoi"); Genius 214. "3 Straight Losses for Seigaku!?" (青学3連敗！？, "Seigaku 3 renpai!?"); Genius 215. "The Champions Who Do Not Permit Losing" (負けることの許されない王者, "Makeru koto no yurusarenai ōja"); Genius 216. "Kirihara Akaya vs Fuji Syusuke" (切原赤也VS不二周介, "Kirihara Akaya VS Fuji Shūsuke"); Genius 217. "A Trap Aiming for a Moment's Chance" (一瞬の隙を狙うワナ, "Isshun no suki o nerau wana"); Genius 218. "Catalyst" (きっかけ, "Kikkake"); Genius 219. "And Fuji Smiles" (そして不二は微笑む, "Soshite Fuji wa hohoemu")
26	Finale; Shūmaku (終幕)	December 3, 2004; 4-08-873678-8	July 1, 2008; 978-1-4215-1648-6
Genius 220. "In a Pinch, a Hidden Miracle" (ピンチがくれた奇跡, "Pinchi ga kureta kiseki"); Genius 221. "Place of Arrival" (たどり着きし場所, "Tadoritsukishi basho"); Genius 222. "Finale" (終幕, "Shūmaku"); Genius 223. "Feeling of Existence" (存在感, "Sonzai-kan"); Genius 224. "Here Comes Ryoma" (リョーマがゆく, "Ryōma ga yuku"); Genius 225. "Echizen Ryoma vs Sanada Genichirou" (越前リョーマVS真田玄一郎, "Echizen Ryōma VS Sanada Genichirō"); Genius 226. "An Existence That Transcends Self-Actualization" (無我を超越せし存在, "Muga o chōetsu seshi sonzai"); Genius 227. "A Shocking Fact" (驚愕の事実, "Kyōgaku no jijitsu"); Genius 228. "One Who Falls with Despair" (絶望と共に散りゆく者, "Zetsubō to tomoni chiri yuku mono"); Genius 229. "Until the Very Last Point" (最後の1球まで, "Saigo no 1-kyū made")
27	The Captain's Decision; Buchō no ketsudan (部長の決断)	January 5, 2005; 4-08-873769-5	September 2, 2008; 978-1-4215-1649-3
Genius 230. "Seigaku's Pillar of Support" (青学の柱, "Seigaku no hashira"); Genius 231. "Extraordinary Kid" (異端児, "Itan-ji"); Genius 232. "Recollections" (追憶, "Tsuioku"); Genius 233. "A High Wall, Therefore" (高き壁...故に, "Takaki kabe yueni"); Genius 234. "The Captain's Decision" (部長の決断, "Buchō no ketsudan"); Genius 235. "The Number One Person Who Hates Losing" (負けず嫌いナンバー1, "Makezugirai Nanbā 1"); Genius 236. "A New Messenger" (新たなる使者, "Aratanaru shisha"); Genius 237. "Seigaku's Summer Vacation" (青学の夏休み, "Seigaku no natsu yasumi")
28	Hyoutei Rhapsody; Hyōtei Rapusodī (氷帝狂詩曲)	April 4, 2005; 4-08-873790-3	November 4, 2008; 978-1-4215-1650-9
Genius 238. "The Greatest Terror in History" (史上最大の恐怖, "Shijō saidai no kyōfu"); Genius 239. "The Approaching Nightmare: Silver Seat" (迫り来る悪夢シルバーシート！！, "Semari kuru akumu Shirubā Shīto!!"); Genius 240. "A Strange Encounter" (奇妙な出会い, "Kimyōna deai"); Genius 241. "Ryoma's Girlfriend" (リョーマのガールフレンド, "Ryōma no Gārufurendo"); Genius 242. "Hyoutei Rhapsody" (氷帝狂詩曲, "Hyōtei Rapusodī"); Genius 243. "The Sleeping Lion" (眠れる獅子, "Nemureru shishi"); Genius 244. "A Place where the Top Talents gather once every 10 years" (10年に1人の逸材が集いし場所, "10-Nen ni 1-ri no itsuzai ga tsudoishi basho"); Wild 1 (Genius 245). "Tough Guy" (wild 1 ゴンタクレ, "(Wild 1) gontakure"); Wild 2 (Genius 246). "Treasure" (wild 2 宝物, "(Wild 2) takaramono")
29	Curtains Rise for the Nationals; Zenkoku kaimaku!! (全国開幕！！)	July 4, 2005; 4-08-873808-X	January 6, 2009; 978-1-4215-1651-6
Wild 3 (Genius 247). "Goodbye Pei-chan... And" (wild 3 さよなら平ちゃん...そして, "(Wild 3) Sayonara Hira-chan... soshite"); Genius 248. "The Curtains Rise for the Nationals" (全国への幕開け, "Zenkoku e no makuake"); Genius 249. "Return of Tezuka" (手塚の帰還, "Tezuka no kikan"); Genius 250. "Oishi's Decision" (大石の決断, "Ōishi no ketsudan"); Genius 251. "Curtains Rise for the Nationals!!" (全国開幕！！, "Zenkoku kaimaku!!"); Genius 252. "The Skill of Okinawa's Higa Jr. High" (沖縄比嘉中の実力, "Okinawa Higachū no jitsuryoku"); Genius 253. "A Lone Man's Battle" (たったひとりの攻防, "Tatta hitori no kōbō"); Genius 254. "Seigaku vs. Higa" (青学VS比嘉, "Seigaku VS Higa"); Genius 255. "One Shot Killer Big Bang" (一撃必殺ビックバン, "Ichigeki hikkoro Bikku Ban")
30	I Hate Gouya; Gōya kirai (ゴーヤ嫌い)	September 2, 2005; 4-08-873848-9	March 3, 2009; 978-1-4215-2431-3
Genius 256. "Each's Service Game" (互いのサービスゲーム, "Tagai no Sābisu Gēmu"); Genius 257. "1 Point Difference" (一ポイントの差, "Ichi Pointo no sa"); Genius 258. "Final Measures" (最終手段, "Saishū shudan"); Genius 259. "I Hate Gouya" (ゴーヤ嫌い, "Gōya kirai"); Genius 260. "Counterattack" (反撃, "Hangeki"); Genius 261. "The spirit of an Artisan" (職人気質, "Shokunin kishitsu"); Genius 262. "A Choice" (選択, "Sentaku"); Genius 263. "Determination Towards Victory" (勝利へのこだわり, "Shōri e no kodawari"); Genius 264. "Fourth Counter: Kagerou Zutsumi" (第4の返し球蜉蝣包み, "Fōsu Kauntā Kagerō Tsutsumi")
31	A Clever Scheme!? Kikumaru's Singles Match; Kisaku!? Kikumaru no Shingurusu (奇策！？菊丸のシングルス)	December 2, 2005; 4-08-873880-2	May 5, 2009; 978-1-4215-2432-0
Genius 265. A Clever Scheme!? Kikumaru's Singles Match" (奇策！？菊丸のシングルス, "Kisaku!? Kikumaru no Shingurusu"); Genius 266. The Provision for that Promise" (その約束を糧に, "Sono yakusoku o kate ni"); Genius 267. Serious Mode" (本気モード, "Maji Mōdo"); Genius 268. The Place to be Found" (見つけるべき場所, "Mitsukerubeki basho"); Genius 269. The man called 'The Hitman'" (殺し屋と呼ばれる男, "Koroshi-ya to yoba reru otoko"); Genius 270. Advice" (忠告, "Chūkoku"); Genius 271. Complete Revival" (完全復活, "Kanzen fukkatsu"); Genius 272. Hyaku Ren Jitoku no Kiwami" (百錬自得の極み, "Hyakuren jitoku no kiwami"); Genius 273. The Best 8 Gather!!" (ベスト8出揃う！！, "Besuto 8 desorou!!")
32	Tricky Fellows; Kusemono dōshi (くせ者同士)	February 3, 2006; 4-08-874015-7	July 7, 2009; 978-1-4215-2433-7
Genius 274. Tricky Fellows" (くせ者同士, "Kusemono dōshi"); Genius 275. The Unreadable Man" (読めない男, "Yomenai otoko"); Genius 276. The Origins of Strength" (強さの原点, "Tsuyo-sa no genten"); Genius 277. The Bloody Showdown" (血みどろの決着, "Chimidoro no ketchaku"); Genius 278. Lighting the Heart on Fire" (気持ちに火をつけろ, "Hāto ni hi o tsukero"); Genius 279. Short-Term Battle" (短期決戦, "Tanki kessen"); Genius 280. Probability...100%" (確率...100%, "Kakuritsu... 100 Pāsento"); Genius 281. The Unbeatable Man" (負けない男, "Makenai otoko"); Genius 282. Tezuka's Close Call" (手塚危機一髪, "Tezuka kiki ippatsu")
33	Tezuka Kunimitsu in Kyushu; Tezuka Kunimitsu Kyūshū-hen (手塚国光九州編)	May 2, 2006; 4-08-874048-3	September 1, 2009; 978-1-4215-2434-4
Genius 283. Tezuka Kyuushuu Arc 1" (手塚国光九州編（1）, "Tezuka Kunimitsu Kyūshū-hen (1)"); Genius 284. Tezuka Kyuushuu Arc 2" (手塚国光九州編（2）, "Tezuka Kunimitsu Kyūshū-hen (2)"); Genius 285. Tezuka Kyuushuu Arc 3" (手塚国光九州編（3）, "Tezuka Kunimitsu Kyūshū-hen (3)"); Genius 286. Tezuka Kyuushuu Arc 4" (手塚国光九州編（4）, "Tezuka Kunimitsu Kyūshū-hen (4)"); Genius 287. The One Who Has Mastered It" (それを極めし者, "Sore o kiwameshimono"); Genius 288. Accident" (アクシデント, "Akushidento"); Genius 289. Hyōtei's Golden Pair" (氷帝の黄金ペア, "Hyōtei no Gōruden Pea"); Genius 290. Double Peak Battle" (ダブルスの頂上対決, "Daburusu no chōjō taiketsu"); Genius 291. Overcome" (克服, "Kokufuku"); Genius 292. The Infinite Possibilities of Doubles" (ダブルスの無限の可能性, "Daburusu no mugen no kanōsei")
34	Synchro; Shinkuro (同調)	July 4, 2006; 4-08-874128-5	November 3, 2009; 978-1-4215-2435-1
Genius 293. Synchro" (同調, Shinkuro); Genius 294. Birth of the True Golden Pairs" (全国一のダブルスペア, "Zenkokuichi no Daburusu Pea"); Genius 295. A Game One Can Be Satisfied With" (満足いく試合とは, "Manzoku iku Gēmu to wa"); Genius 296. The Self-Centered Pair" (唯我独尊二人！, "Yuigadokuson futari!"); Genius 297. Fierce Clash!! Echizen Ryoma vs Atobe Keigo" (激突！！リョーマVS跡部景吾, "Gekitotsu! Echizen Ryōma VS Atobe Keigo"); Genius 298. Prelude to the Battle" (戦いの前奏曲, "Tatakai no Pureryūdo"); Genius 299. World of Ice" (氷の世界, "Kōri no sekai"); Genius 300. An Approach to Perfection" (an approach to perfection, "an approach to perfection"); Genius 301. Supporting Seigaku's Pillar" (青学の柱を背負って, "Seigaku no hashira o shotte"); Genius 302. The Value of Ryoma's Experience" (リョーマの経験値, "Ryōma no keiken-chi")
35	Farewell, Hyoutei Gakuen	September 4, 2006; 4-08-874250-8	January 5, 2010; 978-1-4215-2847-2
Genius 303. Decision For Victory" (勝利への選択, "Shōri e no sentaku"); Genius 304. Who's the Winner" (勝つのはどっちだ！, "Katsu no wa dotchida!"); Genius 305. First Defeat" (初の敗北, "Hatsu no haiboku"); Genius 306. Two Princes" (2人の王子様, 2-ri no ōji-sama); Genius 307. Shitenhouji's Skill" (四天宝寺の実力, "Shitenhouji no jitsuryoku"); Genius 308. The Desire to be Close to That Person, Even If It's Just One More Step" (あの人に一歩でも近づきたくて, "Ano hito ni ippo demo chikazukitakute"); Genius 309. Atonement" (けじめ, "Kejime"); Genius 310. Wild Lion" (あばれ獅子, "Abare shishi"); Genius 311. The Man Who Researched Beneath the Surface of Muga" (無我の奥を探求せし男, "Muga no oku o tankyū seshi otoko"); Genius 312. Saiki Kanpatsu no Kiwami" (才気煥発の極み, "Saiki Kanpatsu no kiwami")
36	Heated Battle! Seigaku VS Shitenhouji; Nettō! Seigaku VS Shitenhouji (熱闘！青学VS四天宝寺)	January 9, 2007; 978-4-08-874299-1	March 2, 2010; 978-1-4215-2848-9
Genius 313. Order Announced" (オーダー発表, "Ōdā happyō"); Genius 314. Heated Battle! Seigaku VS Shitenhouji" (熱闘！青学VS四天宝寺, "Nettō! Seigaku VS Shitenhouji"); Genius 315. The Perfect Man" (完璧なる男, "Kanpekinaru otoko"); Genius 316. One Rank Above" (1ランク上, "1 Ranku-jō"); Genius 317. Fuji's Desperation" (不二必死, "Fuji hisshi"); Genius 318. Bible vs *Genius" (聖書VS天才, "Baiburu VS tensai"); Genius 319. The Gate That Has Been Shut Hard" (その門は固く閉ざされた, "Sono mon wa kataku tozasa reta"); Genius 320. My Time" (My Time, "My Time"); Genius 321. Period" (終止符, "Piriodo")
37	The Terror of Comic Tennis; Owarai Tenisu no kyōfu (お笑いテニスの恐怖)	March 2, 2007; 978-4-08-874326-4	May 4, 2010; 978-1-4215-2849-6
Genius 322. The Terror of Comic Tennis" (お笑いテニスの恐怖, "Owarai Tenisu no kyōfu"); Genius 323. Comepri" (コメプリ, "Komepuri"); Genius 324. Grasp the Poker Face!!" (ポーカーフェイスを手に入れろ！！, "Pōkā Feisu o te ni irero!!"); Genius 325. Be Stubborn" (意地を張れ！！, "Iji o hare!!"); Genius 326. Prince of Impressions: Hitouji Yuuji and Koharu's Love Chapter" (モノマネ王子～一氏ユウジに小春ゾッコンの巻～, "Monomane ōji ~ Hitouji Yūji ni Koharu zokkon no maki ~"); Genius 327. Because We Are Rivals" (ライバルだからこそ, "Raibaru dakara koso"); Genius 328. Creator" (本家, "Honke"); Genius 329. Seigaku's Extra Baggage" (青学のお荷物, "Seigaku no o nimotsu"); Genius 330. The Greatest Respect" (最大の礼儀, "Saidai no reigi"); Genius 331. The Last Tennis Match" (最後のテニス, "Saigo no Tenisu")
38	The Fierce Battle! 1-Ball Match: Echizen Ryoma VS Tooyama Kintarou; Gekitotsu! 1-kyū shōbu Echizen Ryōma VS Tōyama Kintarō (激突！1球勝負 越前リョーマVS遠山金太郎)	June 4, 2007; 978-4-08-874353-0	July 6, 2010; 978-1-4215-2850-2
Genius 332. The Stage is Set" (お膳立て, "Ozendate"); Genius 333. Hyakuren Jitoku vs Saikikanpatsu" (百錬自得VS才気煥発, "Hyakuren Jitoku vs Saikikanpatsu"); Genius 334. Absolute Prediction" (絶対予告, "Zettai yokoku"); Genius 335. One's Own Threshold" (己の限界点, "Onore no genkai-ten"); Genius 336. The Final Battle" (最終決戦, "Fainaru Raundo"); Genius 337. The Fierce Battle! 1-Point Match: Echizen Ryoma vs Tooyama Kintarou" (激突！1球勝負 越前リョーマVS遠山金太郎, "Gekitotsu! 1-kyū shōbu Echizen Ryōma VS Tōyama Kintarō"); Genius 338. Devil" (悪魔, "Debiru"); Genius 339. The Whereabouts of the One-Point Match" (1球勝負の行方, "1-kyū shōbu no yukue"); Genius 340. Towards the Prince of Tennis" (テニスの王子達へ, "Tenisu no ōji-tachi e"); Genius 341. Tonight is a Yakiniku Party" (今夜は焼肉パーティーだ！, "Kon'ya wa Yakiniku Pātī da!")
39	Outbreak! Yakiniku Battle!! Boppatsu! Yakiniku Batoru!! (勃発！焼肉バトル！！)	September 4, 2007; 978-4-08-874396-7	October 5, 2010; 978-1-4215-2851-9
Genius 342. Outbreak! Yakiniku Battle!!" (勃発！焼肉バトル！！, "Boppatsu! Yakiniku Batoru!!"); Genius 343. Requiem to the Fallen" (散りゆく者達への鎮魂歌, "Chiri yuku-sha-tachi e no Rekuiemu"); Genius 344. Farewell Yakiniku Sauce: The Golden Flavor" (サラバ焼肉のタレ～黄金の味～, "Saraba yakiniku no tare ~ kogane no aji ~"); Genius 345. Where is Ryoma?" (リョーマはいずこ, "Ryōma wa izu ko"); Genius 346. Animosity" (わだかまり, "Wadakamari"); Genius 347. "Lightning" and "Shadow"" (『雷』と『陰』, ""Ka" to "In""); Genius 348. Fuu Rin Ka In Zan Rai" (風林火陰山雷, "Fū Rin Ka In Zan Rai"); Genius 349. Tezuka Zone Defeated" (敗れた手塚ゾーン, "Yabureta Tezuka zōn"); Genius 350. Conviction" (覚悟, "Kakugo"); Genius 351. Captain and Vice-Captain" (部長と副部長, "Buchō to fuku buchō")
40	The Prince Who Forgot Tennis; Tenisu o wasureta ōji-sama (テニスを忘れた王子様)	December 4, 2007; 978-4-08-874422-3	January 4, 2011; 978-1-4215-2852-6
Genius 352. Certain Expectation" (思惑アリ, "Omowaku ari"); Genius 353. The Whereabouts of the Ball" (人生のゆくえ, "Bōru no yukue"); Genius 354. The Prince who forgot Tennis" (テニスを忘れた王子様, "Tenisu o wasureta ōji-sama"); Genius 355. Broken Spirit" (砕かれし心, "Kudaka reshi kokoro"); Genius 356. The Master Beast Tamer" (猛獣使いの達人, "Mōjūzukai no tatsujin"); Genius 357. Straight and Curved" (直線と曲線, "Chokusen to kyokusen"); Genius 358. Kaidou Awakens" (海堂覚醒, "Kaidō kakusei"); Genius 359. Nightmare" (悪夢, "Akumu"); Genius 360. Fuji Shusuke vs Tezuka Kunimitsu" (不二周助VS手塚国光, "Fuji Shūsuke VS Tezuka Kunimitsu")
41	The Final Battle! The Prince VS the Child of God; Saishū kessen! Ōji-sama VS shin no ko (最終決戦！王子様VS神の子)	March 4, 2008; 978-4-08-874443-8	April 5, 2011; 978-1-4215-2853-3
Genius 361. Thought Beyond 2 Years" (2年越しの想い, "2 toshikoshi no omoi."); Genius 362. Fuji Shusuke's Great Wall - 2nd Match" (不二周助最大の壁～2番手として～, "Fuji Shūsuke saidai no kabe ~ 2-bante to shite ~"); Genius 363. With Close Eyes, My Heart Feels You" (瞳を閉じて心のまま僕は君を想う, "Hitomi o tojite kokoro no mama boku wa kimi o omou"); Genius 364. Trickery" (詐欺, "Peten"); Genius 365. Time, Moving Once Again" (動き出した時間, "Ugokidashita jikan"); Genius 366. Remember!!" (思い出せ！！, "Omoidase!!"); Genius 367. 1 Piece of Memory" (記憶のピース, "Kioku no Pīsu"); Genius 368. Bonds" (絆, "Kizuna"); Genius 369. Join With Ryoma" (リョーマに繋げ, "Ryōma ni tsunage"); Genius 370. Reinforcements" (援軍, "Engun"); Genius 371. Final Battle! The Prince vs The Child of God" (最終決戦！王子様VS神の子, "Saishū kessen! Ōji-sama VS shin no ko")
42	Dear Prince; Dear Prince (Dear Prince)	June 4, 2008; 978-4-08-874522-0	July 5, 2011; 978-1-4215-2854-0
Genius 372. Final Battle! The Prince vs The Child of God 2" (最終決戦！王子様VS神の子2, "Saishū kessen! Ōji-sama VS-shin no ko 2"); Genius 373. Final Battle! The Prince vs The Child of God 3" (最終決戦！王子様VS神の子3, "Saishū kessen! Ōji-sama VS-shin no ko 3"); Genius 374. Final Battle! The Prince vs The Child of God 4" (最終決戦！王子様VS神の子4, "Saishū kessen! Ōji-sama VS-shin no ko 4"); Genius 375. Final Battle! The Prince vs The Child of God 5" (最終決戦！王子様VS神の子5, "Saishū kessen! Ōji-sama VS-shin no ko 5"); Genius 376. Final Battle! The Prince vs The Child of God 6" (最終決戦！王子様VS神の子6, "Saishū kessen! Ōji-sama VS-shin no ko 6"); Genius 377. Final Battle! The Prince vs The Child of God 7" (最終決戦！王子様VS神の子7, "Saishū kessen! Ōji-sama VS-shin no ko 7"); Genius 378. Final Battle! The Prince vs The Child of God 8" (最終決戦！王子様VS神の子8, "Saishū kessen! Ōji-sama VS-shin no ko 8"); Genius 379. Dear Prince: To The Princes of Tennis" (Dear Prince～テニスの王子様達へ～, "Dear Prince: Tenisu no ōjisama-tachi e")

=== The Prince of Tennis II ===
No.	Release date	ISBN
1	August 4, 2009	978-4-08-874724-8
Golden Age 1. "The Prince Returns Home" (帰ってきた王子様, "Kaette kita ōjisama"); Golden Age 2. "The True Strength of the Middle Schoolers" (中学生の実力, "Chūgakusei no jitsuryoku"); Golden Age 3. "The True Strength of the High Schoolers" (高校生の実力, "Kōkōsei no jitsuryoku"); Golden Age 4. "Momoshiro's Demon-Slaying" (桃太郎の鬼退治, "Momotarō no oni taiji"); Golden Age 5. "Momoshiro's Determination" (桃城の決意, "Momoshiro no ketsui"); Golden Age 6. "Attacking Your Comrade" (同士討ち, "Dōshi uchi"); Golden Age 7. "Surmounting the Harsh Trials" (苛酷な試練を乗り越えろ, "Kakoku na shiren o norikoero")
2	January 4, 2010	978-4-08-874791-0
Golden Age 8. "The Emperor vs. The Child of God (Opening Act)" (皇帝VS神の子（前編）, "Kōtei VS kami no ko (zenpen)"); Golden Age 9. "The Emperor vs. The Child of God (Final Act)" (皇帝VS神の子（後編）, "Kōtei VS kami no Ko (kōhen)"); Golden Age 10. "Those Chosen by their Captains (Opening Act)" (部長の選択（前編）, "Buchō no sentaku (zenpen)"); Golden Age 11. "Those Chosen by their Captains (Final Act)" (部長の選択（後編）, "Buchō no sentaku (kōhen)"); Golden Age 12. "Lost Children" (迷子, "Maigo"); Golden Age 13. "Encounter" (遭遇, "Sōgū"); Golden Age 14. "The Preface to Battle" (戦いの序章, "Tatakai no joshō"); Golden Age 15. "Successive Winners" (勝者続々, "Shōsha zokuzoku"); Golden Age 16. "Winners and Losers" (勝者、そして敗者..., "Shōsha, soshite haisha")
3	April 30, 2010	978-4-08-870041-0
Golden Age 17. "The Losers Crawl On Up" (這い上がれ負け組！, "Hai agare make-gumi!"); Golden Age 18. "Heaven Or Hell" (天国か地獄か, "Tengoku ka jigoku ka"); Golden Age 19. "Starting from Zero" (ゼロからのスタート, "Zero kara no Sutāto"); Golden Age 20. "Sudden Death Match" (サドンデスマッチ, "Sadon Desu Matchi"); Golden Age 21. "Special Mission" (特別任務, "Supesharu Misshon"); Golden Age 22. "Naive Trap" (甘いワナ, "Amai wana"); Golden Age 23. "Athlete Hunt (Opening Act)" (スポーツマン狩り （前編）, "Supōtsu Man gari (zenpen)"); Golden Age 24. "Athlete Hunt (Final Act)" (スポーツマン狩り （後編）, "Supōtsu Man gari (kōhen)"); Golden Age 25. "Transformation" (変化, "Henka"); Golden Age 26. "Revolution" (革命, "Kakumei")
4	November 4, 2010	978-4-08-870138-7
Golden Age 27. "The Opening Gate" (開かれた門, "Hirakareta mon"); Golden Age 28. "The Mysterious Relationship between Oni and the Middle Schoolers" (鬼と中学生の不思議な関係, "Oni to chūgakusei no fushigina kankei"); Golden Age 29. "Team Shuffle" (総入れ替え戦, "Chīmu Shaffuru"); Golden Age 30. "Gravestone" (墓標, "Bahyō"); Golden Age 31. "The Cross' Oath" (十字架の誓い, "Jūjika no chikai"); Golden Age 32. "Forbidden Devil Mode" (悪魔化禁止令, "Debiruka kinshirei"); Golden Age 33. "GOLD"; Golden Age 34. "Angel Mode" (天使化, "Anjeruka"); Golden Age 35. "Decisive Battle between the Seigaku Captains!" (青学部長対決！, "Aogaku buchō taiketsu!"); Golden Age 36. "Wish" (願い, "Negai")
5	March 4, 2011	978-4-08-870215-5
Golden Age 37. "Farewell Tezuka Kunimitsu" (さらば手塚国光, "Saraba Tezuka Kunimitsu"); Golden Age 38. "One Step Ahead..." (一歩先へ．．．, "Ippo saki he..."); Golden Age 39. "Evolution" (進化, "Shinka"); Golden Age 40. "Trusting Too Much" (過信, "Kashin"); Golden Age 41. "Process" (過程, "Katei"); Golden Age 42. "Breaking One's Pride" (打ち砕だかれた自尊心, "Uchiku daka reta Puraido"); Golden Age 43. "Atobe Kingdom" (跡部王国, "Atobe Kingudamu"); Golden Age 44. "To Tie-Break" (タイブレークへ, "Taiburēku he"); Golden Age 45. "Struggle" (持久戦, "Jikyūsen"); Golden Age 46. "The Promise Is Finally Fulfilled" (約束は果たされる為にある, "Yakusoku wa hatasareru tameni aru"); Golden Age 47. "Gate" (開門, "Kaimon")
6	September 2, 2011	978-4-08-870331-2
Golden Age 48. "The Return of the Losers" (負け組の帰還, "Makegumi no kikan"); Golden Age 49. "The Prince of Pillow Fighting" (枕投げの王子様, "Makuranage no ōjisama"); Golden Age 50. "VS The Overseas Expedition Group" (VS海外遠征組, "Bāsazu kaigai-gumi"); Golden Age 51. "Those Known to the World" (世界を知った者達, "Sekai o shitta-sha-tachi"); Golden Age 52. "The Revolution Begins" (革命始動, "Kakumei shidō"); Golden Age 53. "Those who began to move" (動き出した奴等, "Ugokidashita yatsura"); Golden Age 54. "Counterattack of the Black Jersey Brigade" (黒ジャージ軍団の逆襲, "Kuro Jāji gundan no gyakushū"); Golden Age 55. "Appearance of the Star Performer" (真打ちの登場, "Shinuchi no tōjō"); Golden Age 56. "The Threat of Vanish" (消失の恐怖, "Banisshu no kyōfu"); Golden Age 57. "Sharp Shooting" (狙撃, "Sogeki"); Golden Age 58. "A Mirror Image" (鏡像, "Kyōzō")
7	January 4, 2012	978-4-08-870363-3
Golden Age 59. "The Insurmountable Wall" (高すぎる壁, "Takasugiru kabe"); Golden Age 60. "Promise" (約束, "Yakusoku"); Golden Age 61. "Counterattack of the Revolutionary Brigade" (革命軍団の咆哮, "Kakumei gundan no hōkō"); Golden Age 62. "Conquer" (攻略, "Kōryaku"); Golden Age 63. "108th Level Hadōkyū" (佰八式波動球, "Hyakuhachi shiki Hadōkyū"); Golden Age 64. "Farewell, strong Middle Schoolers" (さらば強き中学生, "Saraba tsuyoki chūgakusei"); Golden Age 65. "Upset Victory" (番狂わせ, "Bankuruwase"); Golden Age 66. "Towards Tomorrow" (明日へ, "Ashita he"); Golden Age 67. "Their Respective Thoughts" (それぞれの胸中, "Sorezore no kyōchū"); Golden Age 68. "Reunion" (再会, "Saikai")
8	July 4, 2012	978-4-08-870472-2
Golden Age 69. "The Night Before the Decisive Battle" (決戦前夜, "Kessen zenya"); Golden Age 70. "The Ultimate Army – Genius 10" (最強軍団Genious10, "Saikyō gundan Genious 10"); Golden Age 71. "Illusion Doubles Pair" (幻のダブルスペア, "Maboroshi no Daburusu Pea"); Golden Age 72. "Infinity is Closest to Me" (限りなく本物へ, "Kagirinaku honmono he"); Golden Age 73. "Just a Bit more Power" (あと少しの力, "Ato sukoshi no chikara"); Golden Age 74. "Abnormality" (異変, "Ihen"); Golden Age 75. "Shameful Insight" (醜態, "Shūtai"); Golden Age 76. "If it's Tezuka" (手塚なら, "Tezuka nara"); Golden Age 77. "Something Lost" (失ったもの, "Ushinatta mono")
9	November 2, 2012	978-4-08-870541-5
Golden Age 78. "Phantom Doubles" (幻のダブルス, "Maboroshi no Daburusu"); Golden Age 79. "A Losing Goal" (負けというゴール, "Make to iu Gōru"); Golden Age 80. "Unexpected Ambush" (思わぬ伏兵, "Omowanu fukuhei"); Golden Age 81. "The Unreachable Scream" (届かぬ叫び, "Todokanu sakebi"); Golden Age 82. "The Proof of the Victorious" (勝者の証, "Shōsha no akashi"); Golden Age 83. "A Fine Line" (紙一重, "Kamihitoe"); Golden Age 84. "The Ideal Doubles" (理想のダブルス, "Risou no Daburusu"); Golden Age 85. "Request" (リクエスト, "Rikuesto"); Golden Age 86. "Motto" (モットー, "Mottō"); Golden Age 87. "Successful Deal" (成功ディール, "Seikō Dīru"); Golden Age 88. "The Truth Behind the Betrayal" (裏切りの真相, "Uragiri no shinsō"); Golden Age 89. "Marui's Willpower" (マルイの自制心, "Marui no Jiseishin")
10	April 4, 2013	978-4-08-870653-5
Golden Age 90. "The Hitman's Gum" (殺し屋にガムを, "Koroshi-ya ni Gamu o"); Golden Age 91. "Wild Awakening" (目覚めし野生, "Mezame shi yasei"); Golden Age 92. "Target Capture" (標的補捉, "Tāgetto hosoku"); Golden Age 93. "Oni's Story" (鬼の昔話, "Oni no mukashibanashi"); Golden Age 94. "Byōdōin VS Oni (Opening Act)" (平等院VS鬼（前編）, "Byōdōin VS Oni (zenpen)"); Golden Age 95. "Byōdōin VS Oni (Final Act)" (平等院VS鬼（後編）, "Byōdōin VS Oni (kōhen)")
11	September 4, 2013	978-4-08-870813-3
Golden Age 96. "A Demon... Once More" (鬼神...再び, "Kishin... futatabi"); Golden Age 97. "Conclusion of the Off-Court Battle!" (場外バトル決着, "Jōgai Batoru ketchaku"); Golden Age 98. "Seeking Even Greater Heights" (更なる高みを求めて, "Saranaru takami o motomete"); Golden Age 99. "Golden Tennis" (金テニ, "Kin Teni"); Golden Age 100. "Emperor X Monster" (皇帝X怪物, "Kōtei X kaibutsu"); Golden Age 101. "Akutsu's Withdrawal" (亜久津部活やめるってよ, "Akutsu yameru tte yo"); Golden Age 102. "Lucky or Unlucky"; Golden Age 103. "Each and Every Fate" (それぞれの因縁, "Sorezore no in'nen"); Golden Age 104. "The First String's Pace (1軍ペース, "Ichigun Pēsu"); Golden Age 105. "Duel Wielding Ohmagari Ryuuji" (二刀流大曲竜次, "Nitōryū Ōmagari Ryūji"); Golden Age 106. "Karma" (宿命, "Shukumei"); Golden Age 107. "Black Aura" (黒色のオーラ, "Kokushoku no Ōra")
12	March 4, 2014	978-4-08-880050-9
Golden Age 108. "Nothing" (無, "Mu"); Golden Age 109. "Look Over There" (あっち向いてホイ, "Atchimuitehoi"); Golden Age 110. "Our Own Revolution" (自分革命, "Jibun kakumei"); Golden Age 111. "Double Clutch" (ダブルケラッチ, "Daburu Keratchi"); Golden Age 112. "Their Past" (2人の過去, "Futari no kako"); Golden Age 113. "Big Brother and Little Brother" (兄と弟, "Ani to otōto"); Golden Age 114. "Orange" (オレンジ, "Orenji"); Golden Age 115. "Reminiscence" (追憶, "Tsuioku"); Golden Age 116. "Abuse" (リンチ, "Rinchi"); Golden Age 117. "The Top" (トップ, "Toppu"); Golden Age 118. "Into the Divine Path of the Asura" (阿修羅の新道へ, "Ashura no shindō e"); Golden Age 119. "The Struggle for Life or Death" (命の殺り合い, "Inochi no yari ai")
13	August 4, 2014	978-4-08-880159-9
Golden Age 120. "Supreme Ruler" (覇王, "Haō"); Golden Age 121. "Awakening at the Time of Death" (最期の覚悟, "Saigo no kakugo"); Golden Age 122. "Determination" (決断, "Ketsudan"); Golden Age 123. "The Strong" (強き者達, "Tsuyoki mono tachi"); Golden Age 124. "To Our Future" (未来の僕らへ, "Mirai no bokura e"); Golden Age 125. "Samurai" (サムライ, "Samurai"); Golden Age 126. "Camp Eviction" (合宿退去, "Gasshuku taikyo"); Golden Age 127. "A Brief Calm" (束の間の休息, "Tsukanoma no kyūsoku"); Golden Age 128. "Fortune Slips" (おみくじ, "Omikuji"); Golden Age 129. "Invitation" (誘い, "Sasoi")
14	March 4, 2015	978-4-08-880230-5
Golden Age 130. "Those Who Lead The Way" (導くもの, "Michibiku mo no"); Golden Age 131. "The Head Coach Appears" (監督登場, "Kantoku tōjō"); Golden Age 132. "Baptism" (洗礼, "Senrei"); Golden Age 133. "The 14th Man" (14人目の男, "Jūyon hitome no otoko"); Golden Age 134. "Ryoma Goes Forth" (RYOMAがゆく☆, "Ryoma ga yuku☆"); Golden Age 135. "The path straight to being a pro" (プロへの正しき道, "Puro e no tadashiki michi"); Golden Age 136. "The Horrifying Akuto Meshi" (戦慄のアクトメシ, "Senritsu no Akuto Meshi"); Golden Age 137. "The Grand Pickup Battle! The Spirit of the Japanese Boys Tennis is Here!!" (壮絶ナンパ対決！日本テニス男児の意地を今ここに！, "Sōzetsu nanpa taiketsu! Nihon Tenisu danji no iji o imakoko ni!")
15	July 3, 2015	978-4-08-880490-3
Golden Age 138. "Ultimate Rivals" (最強のライバル, "Saikyō no Raibaru"); Golden Age 139. "The Ultimate Draw Luck" (最強のクジ運, "Saikyō no kuji un"); Golden Age 140. "The Pre-World Cup Opens!!" (プレW杯開幕！！, "Pure W-Kappu kaimaku!!"); Golden Age 141. "A Perfect Away" (完全アウェー, "Kanzen au~ē"); Golden Age 142. "Turning the Tables" (形勢逆転, "Keisei gyakuten"); Golden Age 143. "Goodbye, Tezuka Kunimitsu" (さよなら手塚国光, "Sayonara Tezuka Kunimitsu"); Golden Age 144. "My "Guidepost"" (ボクの『道標』, "Boku no "Michishirube""); Golden Age 145. "Destroyer" (破壊王, "Hakai-ō"); Golden Age 146. "Tacit Consent" (黙諾, "Mokudaku"); Golden Age 147. "Together with Disgrace" (屈辱と共に, "Kutsujoku to tomoni"); Golden Age 148. "Real..." (本来の..., "Honrai no..."); Golden Age 148.5. "Cheering Party from Japan" (日本からの応援団, "Nippon kara no ōen-dan")
16	October 3, 2015	978-4-08-880512-2
Golden Age 149. "Quality of Perfect" (Quality of Perfect, "Quality of Perfect"); Golden Age 150. "Mirage" (蜃気楼, "Shinkirō"); Golden Age 151. "The World's Strongest Man" (世界最強の男, "Sekai saikyō no otoko"); Golden Age 152. "Moment" (刹那, "Setsuna"); Golden Age 153. "Summer Dream" (SUMMER DREAM, "Summer Dream"); Golden Age 154. "Glass of Memories" (ガラスのメモリーズ, "Garasu no Memorīzu"); Golden Age 155. "Goodbye Yesterday" (さよならイエスタデイ, "Sayonara iesutadei"); Golden Age 156. "I'm Here" (俺はここにいる, "Ore wa koko ni iru"); Golden Age 157. "The Compensation of 1 Game" (1ゲームの代償, "Ichi Gēmu no daishō"); Golden Age 158. "Tennis Cyborg" (テニスサイボーグ, "Tenisu Saibōgu"); Golden Age 159. "Opfer" (犠牲者, "Opufā"); Golden Age 160. "Voice of Memory" (記憶の声, "Kioku no koe")
17	February 4, 2016	978-4-08-880609-9
Golden Age 161. "Farewell, Yukimura Seiichi" (さらば幸村精市, "Saraba Yukimura Seiichi"); Golden Age 162. "On the Ball" (今日は冴えている, "Kyō wa sae teru"); Golden Age 163. ""Premonition" and "Senses"" (『予感』と『五感』, ""Yokan" to "gokan""); Golden Age 164. "Resonance" (共鳴, "Kyōmei"); Golden Age 165. "The Sixth Sense" (第六感, "Dairokkan"); Golden Age 166. "A Glimpse into the Future" (一瞬先の未来, "Isshun-saki no mirai"); Golden Age 167. "Pro Baptism" (プロの洗礼, "Puro no senrei"); Golden Age 168. "Proclamation of War" (宣戦布告, "Sensen fukoku"); Golden Age 169. "The Asura Man" (阿修羅の男, "Ashura no otoko"); Golden Age 170. "Pride of an All Japan Representative" (日本代表としての意地, "Nihon daihyō to shite no iji"); Golden Age 171. "Aiming for World No. 1" (世界一を目指せ, "Sekai ichi o mezase"); Golden Age 172. "A New Enemy" (新たなる敵, "Arata naruteki"); Golden Age 173. "The "Big 4"" (『ビッグ4』, "Biggu 4"); Golden Age 174. "The Night Before the U-17 World Cup Tournament" (『U-17W杯本戦前夜』, "U-17 W-hai honsen zen'ya")
18	July 4, 2016	978-4-08-880692-1
Golden Age 175. "If They Beat You, Beat 'em Back" (やられたらやり返せ, "Yara retara yarikaese"); Golden Age 176. "Granny's Rhapsody" (婆さんラプソディー, "Bā-san Rapusodī"); Golden Age 177. "The Entrusted Racket" (託されたラケット, "Takusareta Raketto"); Golden Age 178. "The Real Battle Begins" (本戦開幕!!, "Honsen kaimaku!!"); Golden Age 179. "Facing a Powerful Foe: vs Greece" (強豪ギリシャ戦, "Kyōgō Girisha-sen"); Golden Age 180. "Fear" (恐怖, "Kyōfu"); Golden Age 181. "Like the Light of the Moon" (月の光のように, "Tsuki no hikari no yō ni"); Golden Age 182. "Reliable Partner" (頼もしきパートナー, "Tanomo shiki Pātonā"); Golden Age 183. "That's My Answer!!" (それが答えだ!!, "Sore ga kotae da!!"); Golden Age 184. "Silver White Light" (『白銀の光』, "Hakugin no hikari"); Golden Age 185. "Proclamation" (宣言, "Sengen")
19	October 4, 2016	978-4-08-880812-3
Golden Age 186. "Shouldering Your Country" (国を背負いし者達, "Kuni o shoishi mono-tachi"); Golden Age 187. "Before Anyone Realized..." (いつの間にか..., "Itsu no aida ni ka..."); Golden Age 188. "Turbulent Beginning" (波乱の幕開け, "Haran no makuake"); Golden Age 189. "Execution Family" (処刑の家系, "Shokei no kakei"); Golden Age 190. "Pathetic Way of Life" (無様な生き様, "Buzama na ikizama"); Golden Age 191. "Time for Repentance" (悔い改めよ, "Kuiaratame yo"); Golden Age 192. "Unwinnable Fight" (勝ち目のない戦い, "Kachime no nai tatakai"); Golden Age 193. "At the End of the Desert" (砂漠の果てに, "Sabaku no hate ni"); Golden Age 194. "Flash Tennis" (閃きテニス, "Hirameki Tenisu"); Golden Age 195. "Upset" (番狂わせ, "Bankuruwase")
20	March 3, 2017	978-4-08-881028-7
Golden Age 196. "Fighting in Enemy Territory" (完全アウェーの戦い, "Kanzen awei no tatakai"); Golden Age 197. "J.J. Dorgias" (J・J・ドルギアスという男, "J.J. Dorugiasu to yū otoko"); Golden Age 198. "Iron Wall" (鉄壁の守備, "Teppeki no shubi"); Golden Age 199. "Black Dragon Double Strike" (黒龍二重の斬, "Kokuryū ni jū no zan"); Golden Age 200. "The Sky of the Past" (あの頃見た空の色, "Ano koro mita sora no iro"); Golden Age 201. "My Friend Genichiro" (ゲンイチローくん, "Gen'ichirō-kun"); Golden Age 202. "Issuing a Challenge" (挑戦状, "Chōsen-jō"); Golden Age 203. "Turning a Deaf Ear" (言う事を聞かない人, "Iu koto o kikanai hito"); Golden Age 204. "Pride of a Master Trickster" (詐欺師のプライド, "Sagi-shi no Puraido")
21	August 4, 2017	978-4-08-881140-6
Golden Age 205. "The King of Chess" (チェスの王様, "Chesu no ō-sama"); Golden Age 206. "The Middle Schoolers' Power" (中学生の強さ, "Chūgaku-sei no tsuyo-sa"); Golden Age 207. "Big Bang" (ボクの時間は動き始める, "Boku no jikan wa ugoki hajimeru"); Golden Age 208. "The Ice Emperor" (氷の皇帝, "Kōri no kōtei"); Golden Age 209. "Team Bamboo's Ultimate Weapon" (チーム竹の最終兵器, "Chīmu take no saishū heiki"); Golden Age 210. "Antagonizing All Allies" (全てを敵に回して, "Subete o teki ni mawashite"); Golden Age 211. "Back to the Starting Point" (フリ出しに戻る, "Furi-dashi ni modoru"); Golden Age 212. "Flight" (羽ばたき, "Habataki"); Golden Age 213. "An Unexpected Conclusion" (意外なる結末, "Igai naru ketsumatsu"); Golden Age 214. "Transcending Borders" (たとえ国が違っても, "Tatoe kuni ga chigatte mo")
22	December 4, 2017	978-4-08-881293-9
Golden Age 215. "Challenging the World No. 2" (世界No. 2への挑戦, "Sekai No. 2 e no chōsen"); Golden Age 216. "Show Your Power to the World" (世界に力を見せつけろ, "Sekai ni chikara o misetsukero"); Golden Age 217. "Byoudoin's Condition... Akutsu's Determination" (その覚悟･･･その条件, "Sono kakugo... sono jōken"); Golden Age 218. "Past Self" (昔の自分, "Mukashi no jibun"); Golden Age 219. "No Matter How Many Times..." (何度でも, "Nando demo"); Golden Age 220. "Consciousness" (意識, "Ishiki"); Golden Age 221. "Becoming a Champion" (盤石なる王者の元で, "Banjaku naru ōja no moto de"); Golden Age 222. "The Eighth Consciousness" (第8の意識, "Dai 8 no ishiki"); Golden Age 223. "The Elusive Break" (遠い1ゲーム, "Tōi 1 Gēmu"); Golden Age 224. "Atonement by Blood" (血のあがない, "Chi no aganai"); Golden Age 225. "More Than Just One Game" (ただの1ゲームではない, "Tada no 1 Gēmu de wa nai"); Golden Age 226. "To The Finals Tournament" (決勝トーナメントへ, "Kesshō Tōnamento e")
23	May 2, 2018	978-4-08-881388-2
Golden Age 227. "A Spirited Shout" (ファイティングエール, "Faitingu Ēru"); Golden Age 228. "My Feelings Towards My Friends" (仲間への想い, "Nakama e no omoi"); Golden Age 229. "Declaration of War" (宣戦布告, "Sensen fukoku"); Golden Age 230. "The Finals Tournament Begins!" (開幕！決勝トーナメント, "Kaimaku! Kesshō Tōnamento"); Golden Age 231. "The Prince on a White Horse" (白馬の王子様, "Hakuba no ōji-sama"); Golden Age 232. "To All High School Reps: Charge!!" (魁!!高校生代表, "Sakigake!! Kōkō-sei daihyō"); Golden Age 233. "Troubled Shiraishi" (悩める白石, "Nayameru Shiroishi"); Golden Age 234. "Melbourne Collection" (メルボルン・コレクション, "Meruborun Korekushon")
24	September 4, 2018	978-4-08-881572-5
Golden Age 235. "Aesthetics" (美学, "Bigaku"); Golden Age 236. "Shall We Negotiate?"; Golden Age 237. "So, Attack"; Golden Age 238. "Five Options" (5つの選択肢, "5-tsu no sentaku-shi"); Golden Age 239. "The Star Bible" (星の聖書, "Hoshi no seisho"); Golden Age 240. "Eccentric Handsome Fellows" (可笑しなイケメン達, "Okashina ikemen-tachi"); Golden Age 241. "The Last Negotiation" (最期の交渉, "Saigo no kōshō"); Golden Age 242. "Unforgivable" (俺は許さない, "Ore wa yurusanai"); Golden Age 243. "The Sports Drink Fairy" (スポーツドリンクの小人, "Supōtsu Dorinku no kobito")
25	January 4, 2019	978-4-08-881735-4
Golden Age 244. "The Artist of the Court" (コート上の芸術家, "Kōto-jō no geijutsu-ka"); Golden Age 245. "Gathering Data" (データを取れ!!, "Dēta o tore!!"); Golden Age 246. "The Supremacy of Data Tennis" (至高のデータテニス, "Shikō no Dēta Tenisu"); Golden Age 247. "Even in Defeat..." (たとえ負けても･･･, "Tatoe makete mo..."); Golden Age 248. "Prince vs Prince" (王子様vs王子様, "Ōji-sama vs ōji-sama"); Golden Age 249. "Boyfriend" (ボーイフレンド, "Bōifurendo"); Golden Age 250. "One-Point Match" (一球勝負, "Ichi kyū shōbu"); Golden Age 251. "The Prince of Aces" (プリンスオブエース, "Purinsu obu Ēsu"); Golden Age 252. "The Shortest Match" (最短試合, "Saitan shiai"); Golden Age 253. "No Way Forward" (打開策なき道, "Dakai saku naki dō")
26	May 2, 2019	978-4-08-881838-2
Golden Age 254. "The Light of Hope" (希望の光, "Kibō no hikari"); Golden Age 255. "You're a Rival" (ライバルはお前だ!!, "Raibaru wa omae da!!"); Golden Age 256. "Super Sweet Spot" (SSS, "SSS"); Golden Age 257. "That Time..." (～あの時･･･, "~Ano toki..."); Golden Age 258. "Hand" (手, "Te"); Golden Age 259. "Don't Stop Tennis!!" (テニスを止めるな!!, "Tenisu o tomeru na!!"); Golden Age 260. "Samurai vs. Knight" (騎士vsサムライ, "Kishi vs samurai"); Golden Age 261. "An Alstroemeria Bouquet" (アルストロメリアの花束を, "Arusutoromeria no hanataba o"); Golden Age 262. "Ninjutsu Tennis" (忍術テニス, "Ninjutsu Tenisu"); Golden Age 263. "Resurrection of the Emperor" (皇帝復活, "Kōtei fukkatsu")
27	August 2, 2019	978-4-08-882033-0; ISBN 978-4-08-908360-4 (limited edition)
Golden Age 264. "The Five Chariots" (五車の術, "Go-sha no jutsu"); Golden Age 265. "Release your Hidden Skills!" (封印せし能力を解放せよ!!, "Fūin seshi nōryoku o kaihō seyo!!"); Golden Age 266. "Your Revolution" (キミの革命, "Kimi no kakumei"); Golden Age 267. "Unveiling a Strong Rival" (ベールを脱ぎし強敵, "Beiru o nugishi kyōteki"); Golden Age 268. "America vs. Switzerland - Part 1" (スイスVSアメリカ①, "Suisu VS Amerika ichi"); Golden Age 269. "America vs. Switzerland - Part 2" (スイスVSアメリカ②, "Suisu VS Amerika ni"); Golden Age 270. "Misunderstanding"; Golden Age 271. "The Best Four Decided" (ベスト4出揃う, "Besuto 4 desorou"); Golden Age 272. "Everyone's Day Before the Semifinals" (それぞれの決勝前日, "Sorezore no kesshō zenjitsu"); Special one-shot "The Future of 5 Schools!!" (5校の未来!!, "5-kō no mirai")
28	January 4, 2020	978-4-08-882192-4
Golden Age 273. "Huddle" (円陣を囲んで, "Enjin o kakonde"); Golden Age 274. "Precision Machine" (精密機械, "Seimitsu kikai"); Golden Age 275. "Obsession" (拘り, "Kakawari"); Golden Age 276. "Hot-blooded vs. Cool-headed" (情熱の男そして冷徹なる男, "Jōnetsu no otoko soshite reitetsu naru otoko"); Golden Age 277. "Quark Puppe" (Quark Puppe (どうでもいい人形), "Quark Puppe (Dō demo ī ningyō)"); Golden Age 278. "Spread Your Wings, Blue Bird" (羽ばたけ青い鳥, "Habatake aoi tori"); Golden Age 279. "Light of Pride" (矜持の光, "Kyōji no hikari"); Golden Age 280. "Craving for Strength" (強さへの渇望, "Tsuyo-sa e no katsubō"); Golden Age 281. "The Japanese Spirit" (大和魂, "Dai wakon"); Golden Age 282. "From Perfect to Ultimate" (完璧から究極へ, "Kanpeki kara kyūkyoku e")
29	May 13, 2020	978-4-08-882289-1
Golden Age 283. "Spinning Soul" (紡がれし魂, "Tsumugare shi tamashī"); Golden Age 284. "Torn Strings" (破られたラケット, "Yabura reta Raketto"); Golden Age 285. "In! 15-40!" (イン！15-40, "In! 15-40"); Golden Age 286. "The Strongest Doubles Pair" (最強のダブルス, "Saikyō no Daburusu"); Golden Age 287. "Misunderstanding" (誤解, "Gokai"); Golden Age 288. "Once in a Lifetime Illusion" (一世一代のイリュージョン, "Ichi-sei ichi dai no Iryūjon"); Golden Age 289. "Professional Dimension" (プロの次元, "Puro no jigen"); Golden Age 290. "Footsteps of the Wicked" (悪夢の足音, "Akumu no ashioto"); Golden Age 291. "Fighting Against The Odds" (勝率0%の戦い, "Shōritsu 0 Pāsento no tatakai"); Golden Age 292. "The Final Illusion" (最期のイリュージョン, "Saigo no Iryūjon")
30	August 4, 2020	978-4-08-882388-1
Golden Age 293. "Revolution" (革命, "Kakumei"); Golden Age 294. "The Only Hope" (唯一の希望, "Yuiitsu no kibō"); Golden Age 295. "To Straddle a White Horse With a Black Heart, Move Backwards by Taking One Step Forwards" (黒い白馬にまたがって前へ前へとバックした, "Kuroi Hakuba ni matagatte mae e mae e to Bakku shita"); Golden Age 296. "Roulette of Destiny" (運命のルーレット, "Unmei no Rūretto"); Golden Age 297. "A Written Challenge to Tezuka" (手塚への挑戦状, "Tezuka e no chōsen-jō"); Golden Age 298. "Sealing the Tezuka Zone" (手塚ゾーン封じ, "Tezuka zōn fūji"); Golden Age 299. "Mirage Mirror" (蜃気楼の鏡, "Shinki rō no kagami"); Golden Age 300. "Lonely Road" (孤独な道, "Kodoku na dō"); Golden Age 301. "To Prove a Point" (証明を果たす為に, "Shōmei o hatasu tame ni"); Golden Age 302. "Zero Senses Tennis" (零感のテニス, "Rei kan no Tenisu")
31	October 2, 2020	978-4-08-882454-3
Golden Age 303. "I'm also Looking for the Next Step" (俺もまた"その先"を探し続けたのだから, "Ore mo mata sono saki o sagashi tsuzuketa no da kara"); Golden Age 304. "Proud Warriors" (誇り高き戦士達, "Hokori takaki senshi-tachi"); Golden Age 305. "Glass Shoes and Footprints" (ガラスの靴と足跡, "Garasu no kutsu to ashiato"); Golden Age 306. "Tezuka Kunimitsu" (手塚国光, "Tezuka Kunimitsu"); Golden Age 307. "Stairs to the Pro" (プロへの階段, Puro e no kaidan); Golden Age 308. "The Wind That Blows to the Winner is Gentle" (勝者に吹く風は優しく, Shōsha ni fuku kaze wa yasashiku); Golden Age 309. "Future" (未来, Mirai); Golden Age 310. "The Stolen Future" (奪われた未来, Ubawareta mirai); Golden Age 311. "The One Called "The Child of God"" (神の子と呼ばれて, Kami no ko to yobarete); Golden Age 312. "For No One But Myself..." (誰かの為じゃなくて･･･, Dare ka no tame ja naku te...)
32	March 4, 2021	978-4-08-882557-1
Golden Age 313: "The End" (顛末, Tenmatsu); Golden Age 314: "Silent Support" (無言の声援, Mugon no seien); Golden Age 315: "To Say Thank You" (ありがとうと言えるように, Arigatō to ieru yō ni); Golden Age 316: "The Destroyer of Teams" (チームを破壊する男, Chīmu o hakai suru otoko); Golden Age 317: "The Trigger That Destroys a Team" (チームを崩壊させるトリガー, Chīmu o hōkai sa seru Torigā); Golden Age 318: "Broken Promise" (破られた約束, Yabura re ta yakusoku); Golden Age 319: "Shut Your Mouth!" (この口を閉じとけ！, Kono kuchi o toji toke!); Golden Age 320: "Prey" (獲物, Emono); Golden Age 321: "Hunting Down Ten'i Muhou" (『天衣無縫』狩り, "Ten'i Muhō" kari); Golden Age 322: "10 Seconds Rule" (10秒ルール, 10 byō rūru)
33	June 4, 2021	978-4-08-882676-9
Golden Age 323: "The Talent to be Second Best" (2位の才能, 2 i no sainō); Golden Age 324: "An Immutable Fate" (変えられぬ運命, Kae rare nu unmei); Golden Age 325: "From Here" (ここから, Kono kara); Golden Age 326: "Companion" (道連れ, Michizure); Golden Age 327: "Change" (チェンジ, Chenji); Golden Age 328: "Deciding the Outcome" (決まっていた勝敗, Kimatte i ta shōhai); Golden Age 329: "Mr. Tiebreak" (Mr.タイブレーク, Mr. Tai Bureiku); Golden Age 330: "The Significance of 1 Point" (1ポイントの重み, 1 Pointo no omomi); Golden Age 331: "A Skilled Hawk Hides Its Talons" (能ある鷹は, Nō aru taka wa); Golden Age 332: "The Curtain Falls Too Soon" (あっけない幕切れ, Akkenai makugire)
34	September 3, 2021	978-4-08-882769-8
Golden Age 333: "Naturally I Follow My Instincts" (そうさ俺は本能のままに, Sō sa ore wa honnō no mama ni); Golden Age 334: "I Won't Be Alone Forever" (限りなく一人ぼっちじゃない, Kagirinaku hitoribocchi ja nai); Golden Age 335: "Guardian Deity" (守護神, Shugo shin); Golden Age 336: "Towards the Ultimate Doubles" (究極のダブルスへ, Kyūkyoku no daburusu e); Golden Age 337: "Dual Activation" (同時発動, Dōji hatsudō); Golden Age 338: "Proof of Growth" (成長の証, Seichō no akashi); Golden Age 339: "Our Desire" (俺達の願い, Ore-tachi no negai); Golden Age 340: "Exotic of Japan" (エキゾチック オブ JAPAN, Ekizochikku obu JAPAN); Golden Age 341: "Auf der Jagd" (狩り, Kari); Golden Age 342: "Time Loop ~ Spiraltaufe ~" (タイムループ～螺旋の洗礼～, Taimu Rūpu～ rasen no senrei～)
35	January 4, 2022	978-4-08-882892-3
Golden Age 343: "Overwriting Memories" (記憶の上書き, Kioku no uwagaki); Golden Age 344: "Because He's Too Strong" (強すぎるが故に, Tsuyo sugiru ga yue ni); Golden Age 345: "Death" (死, Shi); Golden Age 346: "Thunderbolt" (落雷, Rakurai); Golden Age 347: "The Immortal" (不死身の男, Fujimi no otoko); Golden Age 348: "When the Flame of Life Burns Out"; Golden Age 349: "Destroyed and Resurrected" (滅びよ...そして蘇れ..., Horobiyo... soshite yomigaere...); Golden Age 350: "Something a Pro Cannot Do" (プロには出来ない, Puro ni wa dekinai); Golden Age 351: "Demise" (終焉, Shūen); Golden Age 352: "Those Who Fight May Lose. Those who Do Not Fight Have Already Lost" (戦う奴は負けるかも知れない 戦わない奴は既に負けている, Tatakau yakko wa makeru kamo shirenai tatakawanai yatsu wa sudeni maketeiru)
36	July 4, 2022	978-4-08-883087-2
Golden Age 353: "Prince of Yakiniku ~World Mission~" (新焼肉の王子様～ワールド ミッション～, Shin yakiniku no ōjisama ~Wārudo Misshon~); Golden Age 354: "Gluttony Champion Appears" (大食いチャンピオン現る, Ōkui Chanpion genru); Golden Age 355: "Dragon Calvi ~Sealed Coat of Arms~" (ドラゴンカルビ～封印されし紋章～, Doragon Karubi ~Fūin sa reshi monshō~); Golden Age 356: "Everyone has a Chance" (誰にでもあるチャンス, Darenidemo aru Chansu); Golden Age 357: "Love Call" (ラブコール, Rabu Kōru); Golden Age 358: "The Chained Man" (鎖に繋がれし男, Kusari ni tsunaga reshi otoko); Golden Age 359: "Finals Line-Up Selection Matches: Opening Act!!" (決勝メンバー決定戦開幕!!, Kesshō menbā kettei-sen kaimaku!!); Golden Age 360: "Qualifications" (資格, Shikaku); Golden Age 361: "Sniper" (狙撃, Sogeki); Golden Age 362: "The Ice Emperor's Sun and Moon" (氷帝の月と太陽, Kōri tei no tsuki to taiyō)
37	October 4, 2022	978-4-08-883284-5
Golden Age 363. "Win in the Future" (未来を勝ち取れ, Mirai o kachitore); Golden Age 364. "The Man Who Buys Pastries at 2:29PM" (PM2:29にパンを買う男, PM2:29 ni pan o kau otoko); Golden Age 365. "An Unlosable Battle" (負けられない戦い, Make rarenai tatakai); Golden Age 366. "The Decision to Play Doubles" (ダブルスという決断, Daburusu to iu ketsudan); Golden Age 367. "Desire" (願望, Ganbō); Golden Age 368. "To Face Two People" (2人を相手にする事, 2-ri o aite ni suru koto); Golden Age 369. "Break" (綻び, Hokorobi); Golden Age 370. "Love & Peace Man" (Love & Peaceな男, Love & Peace otoko); Golden Age 371. "Aiming Only for Victory" (勝利だけを目指して, Shōri dake o mezashite); Golden Age 372. "I Will Never Lose to the Same Opponent Again" (ボクは同じ相手に二度と負けない, Boku wa onaji aite ni nidoto makenai)
38	February 3, 2023	978-4-08-883413-9
Golden Age 373. "Black Hole Looking Back" (振り返ればブラックホール, Furikaereba Burakku Hōru); Golden Age 374. "Gift from God" (神様からの贈り物, Kamisama kara no okurimono); Golden Age 375. "Double-Edged Sword" (諸刃の剣, Moroba no tsurugi); Golden Age 376. "Destroyed Asura" (破壊された阿修羅, Hakai sareta Ashura); Golden Age 377. "Impatience" (焦り, Aseri); Golden Age 378. "Desperate Situation" (絶体絶命, Zettai zetsumei); Golden Age 379. "Thoughts Dancing in the Wind" (風に舞う想い, Kaze ni mau omoi); Golden Age 380. "Being Like a Younger Brother" (弟のような存在, Otōto no yōna sonzai); Golden Age 381. "Best Buddy" (最高の相棒, Saikō no aibō); Golden Age 382. "Even if I Die, I Won't Pass!" (死んでも通しません!, Shindemo tōshimasen!)
39	July 4, 2023	978-4-08-883563-1
Golden Age 383. "" (仮面の男, Kamen no otoko); Golden Age 384. "" (激震, Gekishin); Golden Age 385. "" (双子の証言, Futago no shōgen); Golden Age 386. "" (決戦へのカウントダウン, Kessen e no kauntodaun); Golden Age 387. "" (導かれしもの達, Michibikare shimo no tasshi); Golden Age 388. "Best Member" (ベストメンバー, Besuto menbā); Golden Age 389. "" (最後の氷帝コール, Saigo no kōri mikado kōru); Golden Age 390. "" (暴かれし能力, Abakare shi nōryoku); Golden Age 391. "" (具現化, Gugen-ka); Golden Age 392. "" (皇帝VS王様, Kōtei VS Ōsama)
40	October 4, 2023	978-4-08-883563-1
Golden Age 393. "" (殺し屋VS王様, Koroshiya VS ōsama); Golden Age 394. "" (聖書VS王様, Seisho VS ōsama); Golden Age 395. "" (可能性, Kanōsei); Golden Age 396. "" (強さを知れ!, Tsuyosa o shire!); Golden Age 397. "" (俺達の未来へ, Oretachi no mirai e); Golden Age 398. "" (超越, Chōetsu); Golden Age 399. "" (兆し, Kizashi); Golden Age 400. "" (王様の選択, Ōsama no sentaku); Golden Age 401. "" (無限進化, Mugen shinka); Golden Age 402. "Do Your Best!" (Do Your Best!)
41	March 4, 2024	978-4-08-883833-5
Golden Age 403. "King's Gambit" (KING'S GAMBIT); Golden Age 404. "" (代償, Daishō); Golden Age 405. "" (その先を..., Sono-saki o...); Golden Age 406. "" (反撃の無敵艦隊, Hangeki no muteki kantai); Golden Age 407. "" (美しき狙撃手, Utsukushiki Sunaipā); Golden Age 408. "" (新アームレスリングの兄貴達, Shin Āmure Suringu no aniki-tachi); Golden Age 409. "" (解禁, Kaikin); Golden Age 410. "" (規格外, Kikakugai); Golden Age 411. "" (育成, Ikusei); Golden Age 412. "" (七人のリョーマ, Nanari no Ryōma)
42	July 4, 2024	978-4-08-884043-7
Golden Age 413. "Family" (FAMILY); Golden Age 414. Takusa reshi kibō (託されし希望); Golden Age 415. Seigi no mikata (kari) (セイギノミカタ(仮)); Golden Age 416. Tadashiki Tenisu (正しきテニス); Golden Age 417. Kesshō ni iru (決勝にいる); Golden Age 418. Kikan (帰還); Golden Age 419. Raketto ni kome rareta omoi (ラケットに込められた想い); Golden Age 420. Ten'i musō (天衣無双); Golden Age 421. Dōtei ni taorete doro ni mamirete (道程に倒れて 泥にまみれて)
43	November 1, 2024	978-4-08-884218-9
Golden Age 422. Orenji no yakusoku (オレンジの約束); Golden Age 423. Unmei no hokorobi (運命のほころび); Golden Age 424. Taiyō no kizuna (太陽の絆); Golden Age 425. Ketsudan (決断); Golden Age 426. Daburusu chōjō taiketsu (ダブルス頂上対決); Golden Age 427. Dōchō vs dōchō (同調vs同調); Golden Age 428. Biggu Sābā no shukumei (ビッグサーバーの宿命); Golden Age 429. Ochi gekkō vs byōdō-in hōō (越知月光vs平等院鳳凰); Golden Age 430. Sōgū (遭遇)
44	May 2, 2025	978-4-08-884465-7
Golden Age 431. Ano hito no tame ni dekirukoto (あの人の為に出来る事); Golden Age 432. Aitsu no tame ni dekirukoto (アイツの為に出来る事); Golden Age 433. Aijōbukai Daburusu (愛情深いダブルス); Golden Age 434. Tane no nōryoku kyōmei ① (種の能力共鳴 ①); Golden Age 435. Tane no nōryoku kyōmei ② (種の能力共鳴 ②); Golden Age 436. Sōsai sa reshi chikara (相殺されし力); Golden Age 437. Toride to naru tame ni (砦となる為に); Golden Age 438. Yume o tsunage (夢を繋げ); Golden Age 439. "Shupurīmu no Daburusu" no kiseki (最高(シュプリーム)のダブルス"の奇跡); Golden Age 440. Deai (出会い)
45	September 4, 2025	978-4-08-884620-0
Golden Age 441. Daburusu o kunde kurete arigatō (ダブルスを組んでくれてありがとう); Golden Age 442. (HARMONY); Golden Age 443. Karera no sentaku (彼らの選択); Golden Age 444. Kakugo no kaigō (覚悟の邂逅); Golden Age 445. Hito no medanore (人のメダノレ); Golden Age 446. Senju no shintō (千手の神道); Golden Age 447. (ESCAPE); Golden Age 448. Kimi no chōsen wa owaranai (キミの挑戦は終わらない); Golden Age 449. Saikyō no hoko (最強の矛)
46	January 5, 2026	978-4-08-884796-2
Golden Age 450. Futago no shinjitsu (双子の真実); Golden Age 451. Gi no kizuna (義の絆); Golden Age 452. Saikyō no hoko vs saikyō no tate (最強の矛vs最強の盾); Golden Age 453. Ketsubetsu (決別); Golden Age 454. Tōshū (答酬); Golden Age 455. Bōsō (暴走); Golden Age 456. Jōsen (乗船); Golden Age 457. Tengoku ka jigoku ka (天国か地獄か); Golden Age 458. Tsuranuki chiri yuku otokotachi (貫き散りゆく男達); Golden Age 459. Waganaha (我が名は…)
47	June 4, 2026	978-4-08-885048-1
Golden Age 460. Shūen (終焉); Golden Age 461. Mau bōshi (舞う帽子); Golden Age 462. Min'na no negai (みんなの願い); Golden Age 463. Tatakau igi (戦う意義); Golden Age 464. (You got game?); Golden Age 465. Aogaku e no kansha (青学への感謝); Golden Age 466. Yakusoku (約束); Golden Age 467. Tobei (渡米); Golden Age 468. Kazoku (家族); Golden Age 469. Issaigassai (一切合切)
48	September 4, 2026	978-4-08-885187-7
Golden Age 470. Echizen Ryōga VS Samurai Nanjiro (越前リョーガVSサムライ南次郎); Golden Age 471. Saikō no jikan (最高の時間); Golden Age 472. Kimi no tame ni (キミのために); Golden Age 473. Kibō to iu na no akumu (希望という名の悪夢); Golden Age 474. Mebaeshi samurai (芽生えしサムライ); Golden Age 475. Kibō no tenisu (希望のテニス); Golden Age 476. Tsuyosa no himitsu (強さの秘密); Golden Age 477. Raketto ni omoide tsumekonde (ラケットに想い出詰め込んで)

=== The Prince of After School ===
No.	Release date	ISBN
1	June 4, 2010	978-4-08-870068-7
2	January 4, 2012	978-4-08-870364-0
3	September 4, 2013	978-4-08-870878-2
4	July 3, 2015	978-4-08-880491-0
5	August 4, 2017	978-4-08-881141-3
6	August 2, 2019	978-4-08-882029-3
7	September 3, 2021	978-4-08-882785-8
8	July 4, 2023	978-4-08-883564-8
9	September 4, 2025	978-4-08-884621-7

== Other ==
=== Official fan books ===
==== The Prince of Tennis ====
No.	Release date	ISBN
10.5	November 2, 2001	978-4-08-873193-3
20.5	December 4, 2003	978-4-08-873549-8
40.5	December 4, 2007	978-4-08-874198-7

==== The Prince of Tennis II ====
No.	Release date	ISBN
10.5	September 4, 2013	978-4-08-870879-9
23.5	May 2, 2018	978-4-08-881491-9

=== Illustrations book ===
No.	Release date	ISBN
30.5	December 2, 2005	978-4-08-782143-7

== See also ==
- List of The Prince of Tennis episodes
- The Prince of Tennis (live-action film)
- Tennis no Ōjisama - Futari no Samurai (animated film)
